= List of television stations in Portugal =

== Terrestrial channels ==
Name	Description	FTA	Format
RTP1	National Public broadcaster	yes	16:9 SD
RTP2	National Public broadcaster	yes	16:9 SD
SIC	First private television station	yes	16:9 SD
TVI	Second private television station	yes	16:9 SD
RTP Açores	Regional Public broadcaster (only in Azores)	yes	16:9 SD
RTP Madeira	Regional Public broadcaster (only in Madeira)	yes	16:9 SD
ARtv	Public broadcaster parliament channel	yes	16:9 SD
RTP Notícias	Public broadcaster news channel	yes	16:9 SD
RTP Memória	Public broadcaster Entertainment channel	yes	16:9 SD

Since 2012, all channels are digital. All national, regional and local Spanish television channels are available to Portuguese households along the national border, subject to restrictions due to distance or local topography. Regional Spanish channels (like TV Galicia or Extremadura TV) usually acknowledge this and cover local events of the border communities on their programs.

== Subscription-based channels ==
All terrestrial channels are available in these platforms and services. Most of the subscription-based channels broadcast from Portugal or have a specific version with independent programs for that market. Most of these channels are widely available across platforms and services: Basic cable and fiber, digital services in cable, fiber, landlines and satellite across the nation.

Name	Description	Services	Format
RTP1	Public broadcaster HD channel	Digital	16:9 SD/HD
RTP África	Public broadcaster African channel	Basic cable/fiber, digital, satellite	16:9 SD
SIC Notícias	News	Basic cable/fiber, digital, satellite	16:9 SD/HD
SIC Mulher	Entertainment	Basic cable/fiber, digital, satellite	16:9 SD/HD
SIC Radical	Entertainment	Basic cable/fiber, digital, satellite	16:9 SD/HD
SIC K	Children	Basic fiber, digital, satellite	16:9 SD/HD
SIC Caras	Entertainment	Digital, satellite	16:9 SD/HD
SIC Novelas	Telenovelas	Basic fiber, digital, satellite	16:9 SD/HD
V+ TVI	Entertainment / Telenovelas / Sports	Basic fiber, digital, satellite	16:9 SD/HD
TVI Reality	Reality shows	Digital, satellite	16:9 SD/HD
CNN Portugal	News	Basic cable/fiber, digital, satellite	16:9 SD/HD
Canal 11	Sports	Basic cable/fiber, digital, satellite	16:9 SD/HD
A Bola TV	Sports	Basic cable/fiber, digital, satellite	16:9 SD/HD
NBA TV	Sports	Basic cable/fiber, digital, satellite	16:9 SD/HD
CMTV	News/ Entertainment	Basic fiber, digital, satellite	16:9 SD/HD
News Now	News	Basic fiber, digital, satellite	16:9 SD/HD
Canal Hollywood	Movies	Basic cable/fiber, digital, satellite	16:9 SD/HD
AXN	TV series / Movies	Basic cable/fiber, digital, satellite	16:9 SD/HD
AXN Movies	TV series / Movies	Basic fiber, digital, satellite	16:9 SD/HD
AXN White	TV series / Movies	Basic fiber, digital, satellite	16:9 SD/HD
Star Channel Portugal	TV series / Movies	Basic cable/fiber, digital, satellite	16:9 SD/HD
Star Life	TV Series / Entertainment	Basic cabler/fiber, digital, satellite	16:9 SD/HD
Star Comedy	TV series	Basic fiber, digital, satellite	16:9 SD/HD
Star Crime	TV series	Basic fiber, digital, satellite	16:9 SD/HD
Panda Kids	Children	Digital, satellite	16:9 SD/HD
Star Movies	Movies	Basic fiber, digital, satellite	16:9 SD/HD
Cinemundo	Movies	Basic fiber, digital, satellite	16:9 SD/HD
AMC Portugal	TV Series / Movies	Basic fiber, digital, satellite	16:9 SD/HD
Blast	TV Series / Movies	Basic fiber, digital, satellite	16:9 SD/HD
BabyTV	Children	Basic fiber, digital, satellite	16:9 SD/HD
Disney Channel Portugal	Children	Basic fiber, digital, satellite	16:9 SD/HD
Disney Jr. Portugal	Children	Basic fiber, digital, satellite	16:9 SD/HD
Canal Panda	Children	Basic cable/fiber, digital, satellite	16:9 SD/HD
VinTV	TV Series / Movies	Basic cable, digital, satellite	16:9 SD
Cartoon Network	Children	Basic fiber, digital, satellite	16:9 SD
Nickelodeon	Children	Digital, satellite	16:9 SD
Nick Jr.	Children	Basic fiber, digital, satellite	16:9 SD/HD
Kanuca TV	Children	Basic fiber, digital, satellite	4:3 SD
TVCine TOP	Movies	Premium, digital, satellite	16:9 SD/HD
TVCine EDITION	Movies	Premium, digital, satellite	16:9 SD/HD
TVCine EMOTION	Movies	Premium, digital, satellite	16:9 SD/HD
TVCine ACTION	Movies	Premium, digital, satellite	16:9 SD/HD
SportTV 1	Sports	Premium, digital, satellite	16:9 SD/HD
SportTV 2	Sports	Premium, digital, satellite	16:9 SD/HD
SportTV 3	Sports	Premium, digital, satellite	16:9 SD/HD
SportTV 4	Sports	Premium, digital, satellite	16:9 SD/HD
SportTV 5	Sports	Premium, digital, satellite	16:9 SD/HD
SportTV 6	Sports	Premium, digital, satellite	16:9 SD/HD
SportTV 7	Sports	Premium, digital, satellite	16:9 SD/HD
SportTV+	Sports News	Basic cable/fiber, digital, satellite	16:9 SD/HD
BTV 1	Sports	Premium, digital, satellite	16:9 SD/HD
Sporting TV	Sports	Digital, satellite	16:9 SD/HD
Eurosport 1	Sports	Basic cable/fiber, digital, satellite	16:9 SD/HD
Eurosport 2	Sports	Digital, satellite	16:9 SD
Fuel TV	Action sports	Basic fiber, digital, satellite	16:9 SD/HD
DAZN 1 Portugal	Sports	Basic cable/fiber, digital, satellite	16:9 SD/HD
DAZN 2 Portugal	Sports	Basic cable/fiber, digital, satellite	16:9 SD/HD
DAZN 3 Portugal	Sports	Basic cable/fiber, digital, satellite	16:9 SD/HD
DAZN 4 Portugal	Sports	Basic cable/fiber, digital, satellite	16:9 SD/HD
DAZN 5 Portugal	Sports	Basic cable/fiber, digital, satellite	16:9 SD/HD
DAZN 6 Portugal	Sports	Basic cable/fiber, digital, satellite	16:9 SD/HD
Porto Canal	Regional	Basic cable/fiber, digital, satellite	16:9 SD/HD
SciFi Portugal	Series / Movies	Digital, satellite	16:9 SD
Canal Q	Entertainment / Comedy	Basic fiber, digital, satellite	16:9 SD
24 Kitchen	Cooking	Digital, satellite	16:9 SD/HD
Casa e Cozinha	Entertainment / Cooking	Digital, satellite	16:9 SD/HD
Canal Odisseia	Documentaries	Basic cable/fiber, digital, satellite	16:9 SD/HD
AMC Break	Documentaries	Basic cable/fiber, digital, satellite	16:9 SD/HD
Canal História	Documentaries / Reality	Basic cable/fiber, digital, satellite	16:9 SD/HD
National Geographic Channel	Documentaries	Basic cable/fiber, digital, satellite	16:9 SD/HD
Discovery Channel	Documentaries / Reality	Basic cable/fiber, digital, satellite	16:9 SD/HD
AMC Crime	Documentaries / Reality	Basic cable/fiber, digital, satellite	16:9 SD
MTV Portugal	Reality / Music	Basic cable/fiber, digital, satellite	16:9 SD/HD
Afro Music	Music	Basic fiber, digital, satellite	4:3 SD
Caçavision	Hunting	Premium, digital, satellite	4:3 SD
HOT TV	Pornography	Premium, digital, satellite	16:9 SD/HD
Playboy TV LA	Pornography	Premium, digital, satellite	SD
Venus	Pornography	Premium, digital, satellite	SD
Globo	Entertainment / Telenovelas	Basic cable, digital, satellite	16:9 SD/HD
GloboNews	News / Brazil	Premium, digital, satellite	16:9 HD
TV Record Europa	Generalist channel / Brazil	Basic cable/fiber, digital, satellite	4:3 SD / 16:9 HD
Record News	News / Brazil	Digital, satellite	16:9 SD
STV Notícias	News / Mozambique	Digital	SD
TPA Notícias	News / Angola	Digital	4:3 SD
RTC	Generalist channel / Cape Verde	Premium, digital	16:9 SD
Euronews	News / Europe	Basic cable/fiber, digital, satellite	16:9 SD
Eurochannel	Entertainment / Movies / Brazil/LA	Digital	16:9 SD
Woohoo	Action sports / Brazil	Digital, satellite	SD
ID	Documentaries	Digital	16:9 SD/HD

== International Portuguese channels ==
International services of the main Portuguese networks, which are unavailable in Portugal. In addition to these, most of the Portuguese subscription-based channels are also available internationally, mostly in Africa.

Name	Description	FTA	Format
RTP Mundo	Public broadcaster International channel	yes	16:9 SD
SIC Internacional	International channel	no	16:9 SD
TVI Internacional	International channel	no	16:9 SD
SIC Internacional África	SIC African channel	no	16:9 SD
RTP África	RTP African channel	yes	16:9 SD

== International thematic channels ==
International channels including thematic channels in foreign languages, subtitled in Portuguese. Most of these channels are available in digital cable and satellite services.

Channel	Description	Country	Language	Availability	Services
E!	Entertainment	UK	English, Portuguese subs		Digital, satellite
TLC	Entertainment	UK	English, Portuguese subs		Basic cable/fiber, digital, satellite
Nat Geo Wild	Documentaries	UK	English, Portuguese subs		Digital, satellite
Travel Channel	Entertainment / Travel	UK	English, Portuguese subs		Basic fiber, digital, satellite
Food Network	Entertainment / Cooking	UK	English, Portuguese subs		Basic fiber, digital, satellite
BabyFirst	Entertainment / Children	Portugal	English, Portuguese subs		Basic fiber
Cartoonito	Children	UK	English, Portuguese		Basic fiber, digital, satellite
Caza y Pesca	Hunting	Spain	Spanish, Portuguese subs		Premium, digital, satellite

== International channels ==
International channels in foreign languages: News and national promotion, thematic channels and those targeted at minority communities in Portugal. Most of these channels are available in digital cable services only, thematic channels may also be available in satellite.

Channel	Country	Language	Availability	Services
TV Galicia	Spain	Galician		Digital, satellite
TVE Internacional	Spain	Spanish		Basic fiber, digital, satellite
Canal Sur Andalucía	Spain	Spanish		Digital
24 Horas	Spain	Spanish		Digital, satellite
Real Madrid TV	Spain	Spanish		Basic fiber, digital, satellite
Cubavisión	Cuba	Spanish		Digital, satellite
Venezolana de Televisión	Venezuela	Spanish		Digital
Globovisión	Venezuela	Spanish		Digital
TeleSur	Latin America	Spanish		Digital
M6	France	French		Digital
France 24	France	French		Digital
France 24	France	English		Basic fiber, digital, satellite
MCM TOP	France	French		Basic fiber, digital
TiJi	France	French		Digital package
myzen.tv	France	English, Spanish, German		Digital
FashionTV	France	English		Basic fiber, digital, satellite
Trace Urban	France	English		Basic fiber, digital, satellite
Mezzo	France	French		Basic cable/fiber, digital, satellite
Arte	France, Germany	French		Digital
TV5Monde	France, Belgium, Canada & Switzerland	French		Basic fiber, digital, satellite
RAI 1	Italy	Italian		Digital
RAI 2	Italy	Italian		Digital
Rai News 24	Italy	Italian		Digital
CNN	United States	English		Basic cable/fiber, digital, satellite
Fox News	United States	English		Digital, satellite
Bloomberg	United States	English		Basic fiber, digital, satellite
NBA TV	United States	English		Digital, satellite
CNBC	United States	English		Digital, satellite
Outdoor Channel	United States	English		Premium, digital
Playboy TV HD	United States	English		Premium, digital, satellite
BBC News	United Kingdom	English		Basic cable/fiber, digital, satellite
Sky News	United Kingdom	English		Basic fiber, digital, satellite
MUTV	United Kingdom	English		Digital, satellite
Ginx	United Kingdom	English		Digital
Fight Network	Canada	English		digital
DW	Germany	English, German		Digital, satellite
RTL	Germany	German		Digital
VOX	Germany	German		Digital
Sat.1	Germany	German		Digital
Das Erste	Germany	German		Digital
ProSieben	Germany	German		Digital
ZDF	Germany	German		Digital
Adult Swim	Mexico	Spanish		Digital
Super RTL	Germany	German		Digital package
BVN	Netherlands	Dutch		Digital
Stingray iConcerts	Switzerland	English		Digital~
Luxe TV	Luxembourg	English		Digital
1+1 International	Ukraine	Ukrainian		Digital
INTER+	Ukraine	Ukrainian		Digital
TVR International	Romania	Romanian		Digital
PRO TV International	Romania	Romanian		Digital
BabyFirst TV	Portugal	Portuguese		Basic fiber
Al Jazeera	Qatar	English		Basic fiber, Digital, satellite
NHK World	Japan	English		Digital
KBS World	South Korea	Korean, English subs		Digital
CGTN	China	English		Digital
CCTV-4	China	Chinese, English subs		Digital
Phoenix InfoNews	Hong Kong	Chinese		Digital
Phoenix CNE	Hong Kong	Chinese		Digital
Zee TV	India	Hindi, English		Premium, digital
Zee Cinema	India	Hindi, English		Premium, digital
SET Asia	India	Hindi		Premium, digital
Sony MAX	India	Hindi, English		Premium, digital
i24news	Israel	English		Digital
i24news	Israel	French, Hebrew		Digital
Trace Africa	France	English		Digital

== FAST channels ==
Name	Description	Availability
RTP Desporto 1	Public broadcaster sports channel	RTP Play
RTP Desporto 2	Public broadcaster sports channel	RTP Play
RTP Desporto 3	Public broadcaster sports channel	RTP Play
RTP Desporto 4	Public broadcaster sports channel	RTP Play
RTP Zig Zag	Public broadcaster children's channel	RTP Play
SIC Replay	Entertainment / TV series	Opto
SIC Alta Definição	channel exclusive program Alta Definição	Opto
TVI Ficção	Entertainment / Telenovelas	TVI Player
TVI África	TVI African channel	TVI Player

== See also ==
- Television in Portugal
- Mass media in Portugal
