= Television in Portugal =

TV viewing share in 2025:
1. TVI (14.9%)
2. SIC (14.6%)
3. RTP1 (11.3%)
4. CMTV (6.30%)
5. CNN Portugal (2.60%)
6. SIC Notícias (2.20%)
7. Star (1.90%)
8. Globo (1.80%)
9. Other channels (44.4%)

Television in Portugal was introduced in 1956 (test broadcasts) by Radiotelevisão Portuguesa (now named Rádio e Televisão de Portugal), which held the nationwide television monopoly until late 1992. Regular broadcasting was introduced on March 7, 1957. Colour transmissions were introduced on March 10, 1980.

Digital terrestrial television (DTT) was introduced at a very late stage when compared to other countries in Europe and with limited channels. According to the European Audiovisual Observatory it occupies the last place out of the 34 European countries with the weakest offer on digital terrestrial television. Due to this, most Portuguese are subscribers of cable (HFC) or IPTV (DSL or FTTH) platforms, in percentages higher than in the rest of Europe and these platforms are well developed with many channels. During the transition from analog to DTT, subscription-based television services experienced a 10% increase and reached 72.5% of homes in 2012. Outside of the internet, there are no regional or local television channels - with the exception of the autonomous state TV channels, RTP Açores and RTP Madeira -, although a couple of pay TV channels are partly or wholly dedicated to regional matters. Portuguese television is regulated by the Entidade Reguladora para a Comunicação Social (ERC).

== History ==
In 1953, a group on behalf of Emissora Nacional de Radiodifusão (later RDP) was set up examining the feasibility of a television service in Portugal. The group started preliminary work for a network of television signals, with a budget on the order of 500,000 escudos. A foreign company had a proposal for the setup of the television network, including the possibility by a foreign company, with high foreign capital, making a proposal for the building of the network and having the exclusive rights of the selling of television sets in the country for a determined period of time In July 1954, their report A Televisão em Portugal (Television in Portugal) was published and was built upon the following pillars:

1. The current status of TV and the opportunity for its introduction in Portugal
2. The operating system to be adopted
3. The solution that seems possible
4. Outline of an initial plan and related charges
5. Economic study
6. List of work already carried out by ENR.

On March 7, 1957 public broadcaster Rádio e Televisão de Portugal (RTP) began broadcasting on RTP1, the first television channel in the country. A second RTP channel, RTP2, started broadcasting on December 25, 1968.

Television was heavily streamlined in the pre-April 25 days. Without implementing the same age system that existed for the theatrical sector, all programs on RTP had to be appealing for a 12+ audience. Highbrow plays were often out of question.

By the mid-1980s, satellite television with foreign channels started to become an alternative to the existing monopoly, while the government was opening the bidding process to the private sector. By August 1987, no less than 60,000 satellite dishes were installed. By 1988, with the ongoing discussions for the creation of private television stations, the number of satellite television users arose to 1 million. A number of pirate television stations existed at this time, with rudimentary equipment and limited programming. These stations were shut down by CTT officials. Even then, television penetration was the lowest in Western Europe, however there was still a large number of undeclared television sets.

Private commercial channels were launched in the early 1990s, with SIC on October 6, 1992, and TVI on February 20, 1993.

In 2021, the 24-hour television news channel TVI 24 was revamped and started to broadcast as CNN Portugal. In December 2021, Lisbon-headquartered investment management firm Alpac Capital signed an agreement to buy a controlling stake in the pan-European television news network Euronews from Egyptian telecoms magnate Naguib Sawiris.

== Terrestrial ==
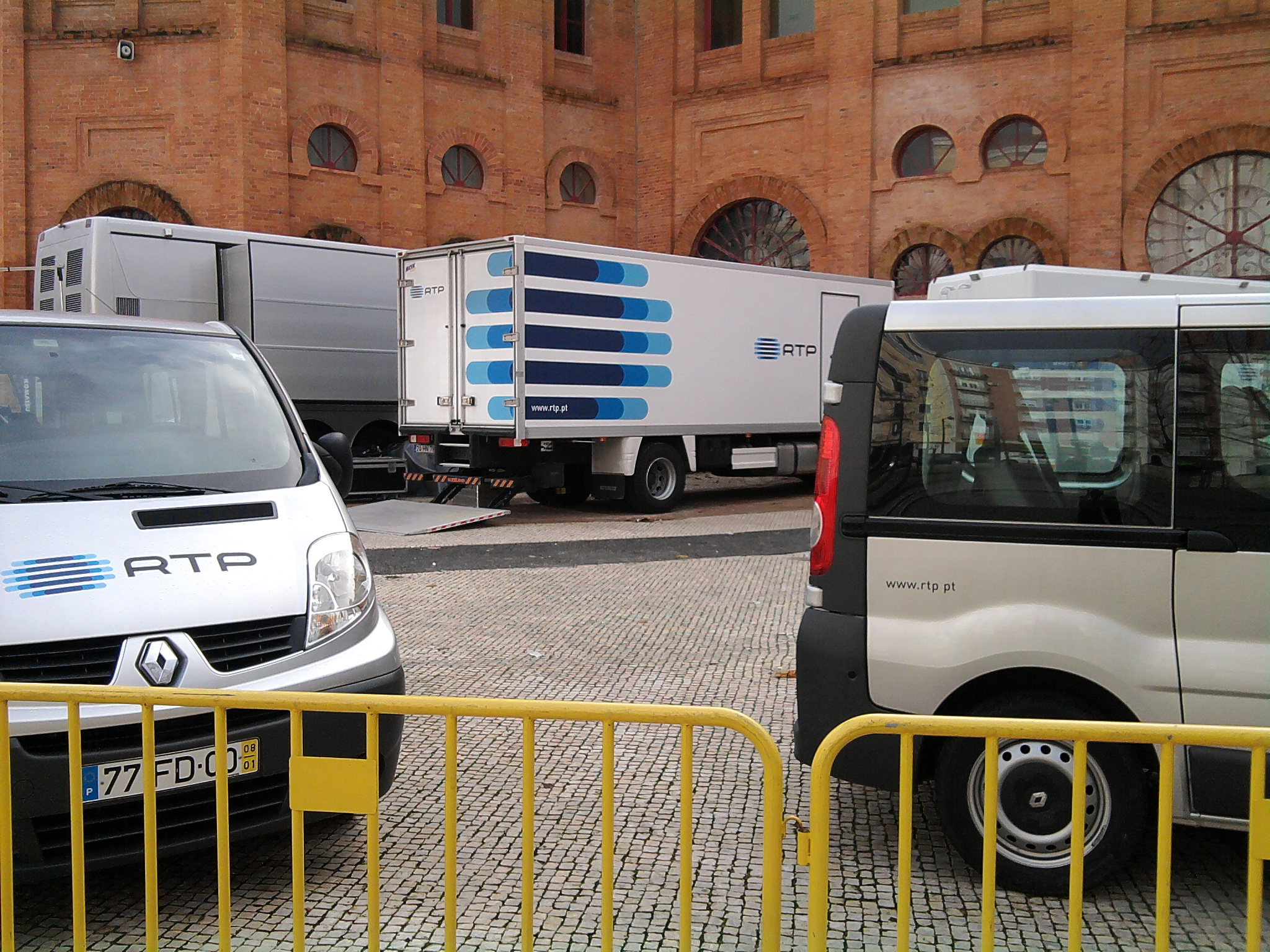
RTP vehicles on a site.

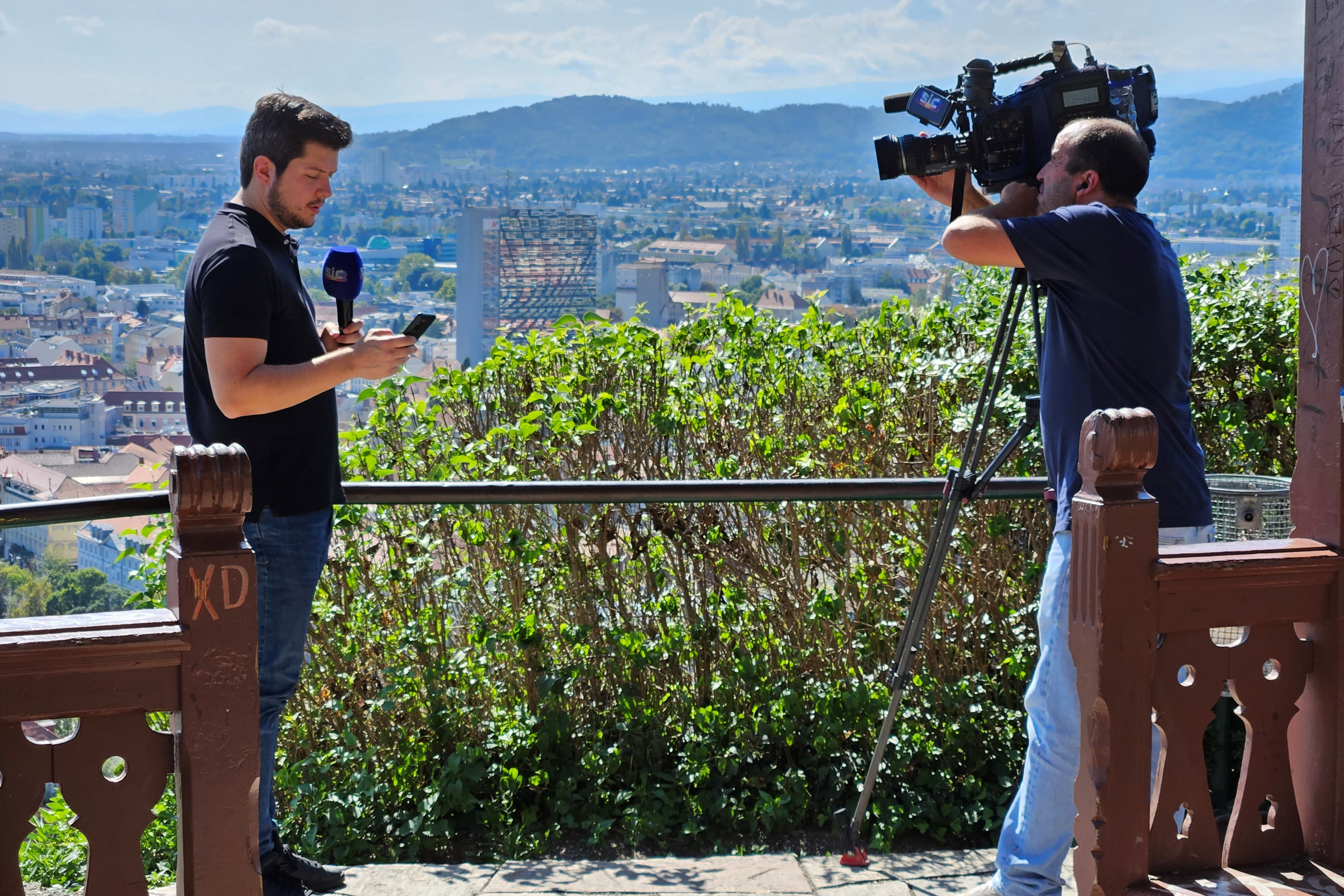
SIC reporter.

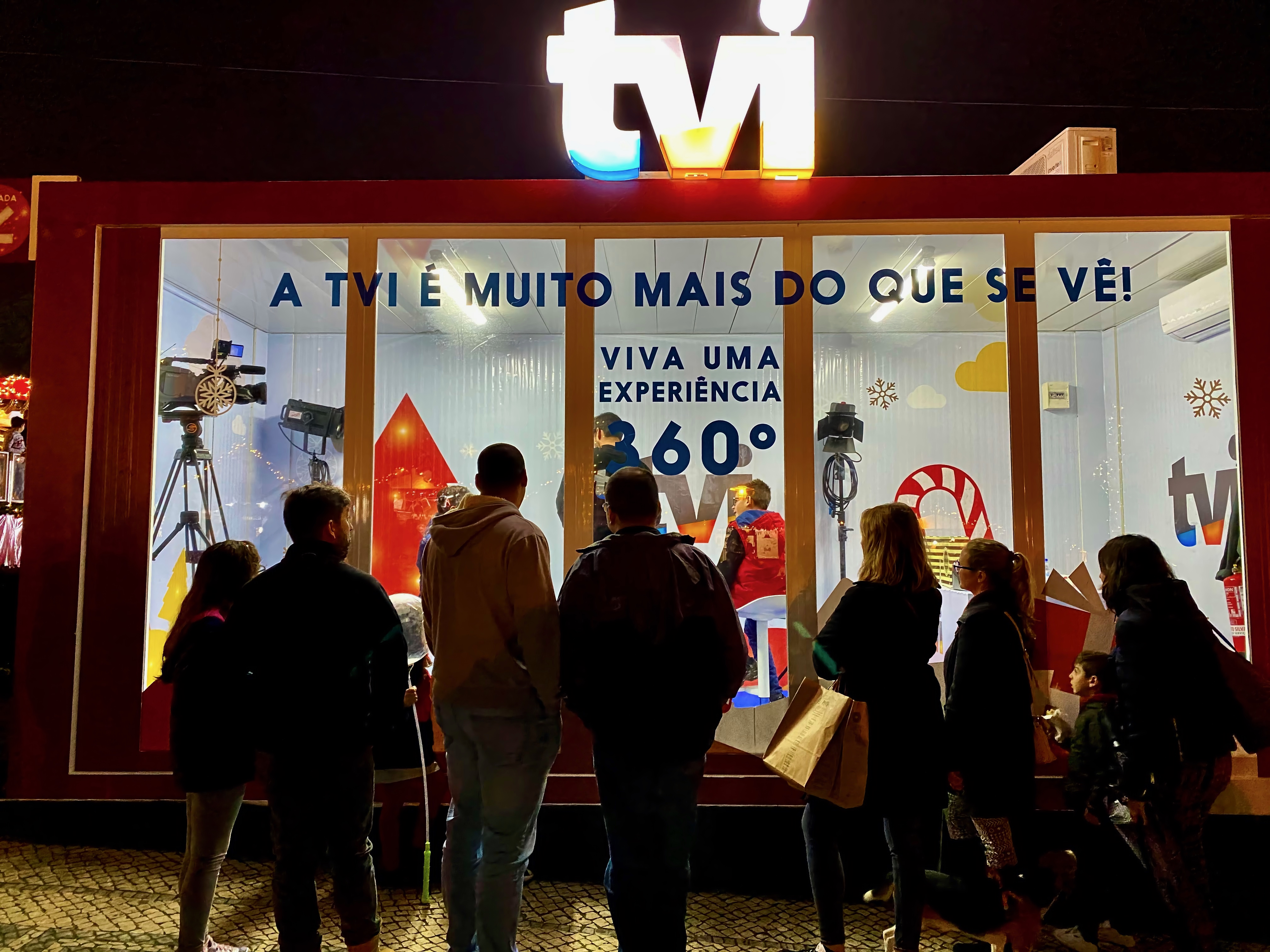
TVI kiosk.

Analog broadcasts in Portugal were discontinued on April 26, 2012. There are eight free-to-air channels on Portuguese terrestrial TV: 6 are owned by the public service broadcaster RTP (with 2 being regional channels that broadcast FTA only in the Madeira and Azores Autonomous Regions), two are from private broadcasters (SIC and TVI) and one is owned by the Assembly of the Republic and broadcasts parliamentary sessions (like BBC Parliament). See Digital terrestrial television in Portugal

=== List of free-to-air terrestrial channels ===
==== Nationwide channels ====
- ARtv (Portugal): a public TV channel that broadcasts the sessions of Assembly of the Republic. The least watched terrestrial channel in Portugal.
- RTP1: the flagship channel of RTP, the Portuguese public broadcasting corporation, and presents a general programming composed mainly by news, talk shows, discussion-based programs, national and international fiction and drama and entertainment. It is the third most watched TV channel in Portugal from 2001 to 2006, 2008, and again from 2011 to present. In the 37 years since its inception in 1957, it was the most watched channel in Portugal until 1995 when SIC overtook it, putting it at second place until 2001 (and again in 2007 and from 2009 to 2010).
- RTP2: the second channel of Portuguese television. It focuses more on intellectual and cultural programming, as well as children and documentary programs. It is the only terrestrial channel in Portugal that broadcasts international (mostly American) TV-series during the prime-time.
- RTP Notícias: a state broadcast news channel from RTP.
- RTP Memória: archive programming from RTP and classic programming from various worldwide broadcasters (ranging from BBC's 'Allo 'Allo! to FOX's The X-Files).
- SIC: The first private television station in Portugal. It broadcasts mainly Brazilian telenovelas and long talk shows (more than 8 hours every day), talent shows, as well as themed programming. Like competitor TVI, SIC does not broadcast many international TV-series during prime-time. It was the second most watched channel for 13 years (save for 2007, 2009, and 2010 when it was at third place) until 2019, when it overtook TVI for the number 1 position. Prior to that, SIC was number 1 from 1995 to 2004, breaking RTP1's long-standing lead.
- TVI: The second private station in Portugal. It focuses mainly on Portuguese telenovelas (usually 5 or more in production at the same time), as well as talk-shows. These talk-shows account for more than 45% of TVI's programming and concentrate mainly on human interest stories, while the other 55% comprises telenovelas. It is also well known for its popular reality shows. The primary target audience of TVI are housewives and the elderly. For over 13 years since 2005 (when it overtook the once-dominant SIC), it reigned as the most watched channel in Portugal before relinquishing the position again to SIC in 2019.

==== Regional channels ====
- RTP Açores: Regional Public broadcaster broadcasting only in Azores.
- RTP Madeira: Regional Public broadcaster broadcasting only in Madeira.

== HD broadcasts ==
HD broadcasts in Portugal began around the late 2000s mostly for sports events through temporary channels. During the 2010s, high definition gained more traction as the standard quality for TV broadcasts with by the end of the decade most television channels having an HD feed. However, high definition is still only available through pay TV services since, as of 2023, it has yet to be implemented for Portuguese Terrestrial Digital Television.

- For the UEFA Euro 2008, TVI became the first Portuguese channel to broadcast in HD, launching TVI HD to broadcast the event (although TVI wouldn't have a permanent HD simulcast until September 2019).
- Also for the UEFA Euro 2008, SportTV launched an HD channel called SportTV HD, and in the beginning of 2009 SportTV HD became a permanent channel, until August 13, 2011, when it was replaced by a simulcast of SportTV 1 and all other Sport TV channels begun broadcasting in HD as well.
- For the Beijing Olympics 2008, RTP launched RTP HD, but this one had non-continuous programming, broadcasting only the Olympics during night time and some RTP2 sports programing during the day.
  - During the day the channel would be closed from 7 am until 3 pm, then it would broadcast RTP 2's Desporto 2 and afterwards it would close until 9 pm to show prime-time TV shows during the week and movies during weekend. During the night, RTP HD would show the Olympics with the time from 12 am to 2 am consisting of reruns and the time from 2 am to 7 am consisting of live events.
  - In 2011, RTP relaunched RTP HD, now with a different name, RTP1 HD, now maintaining regular broadcasts, until November 28, 2017, when it became a permanent simulcast of RTP 1. Meanwhile, RTP 2 would only get its own HD feed on July 2, 2019.
- SIC started test broadcasts in HD in 2009, with UEFA Europa League broadcasts. The channel would however remain inactive afterwards, until 2016 when it began to broadcast certain events in high definition. It wouldn't be until October 6, 2016, the 24th anniversary of the first official broadcasts of SIC, when the channel would finally be implemented as a permanent HD simulcast of SIC, alongside all other SIC owned channel also getting HD feeds.
- Thematic channels on pay TV services begun broadcasting in HD, during the late 2000s, with MOV being the first one to do so in 2008, followed by other channels such as AXN, FOX, FOX Life, TVCine and Syfy in 2009.
  - This process would continue for other pay TV channels over the course of the 2010s, although some like Disney Channel, Cartoon Network and Nickelodeon would only receive HD feeds by 2021, 2022 and 2024 respectively and some channels like BBC News are still broadcasting at standard definition only, despite already having HD signals in other countries in Europe for several years.
- A HD channel is present on Portuguese Digital Terrestrial Television but has yet to be actually used.

== IPTV ==
Optimus Clix has launched in 2006 a service called SmarTV (rebranded as Optimus Clix TV), provided on Amino and Motorola STBs, with VoD provided by Kasenna MediaBase video servers. The service would be merged into ZON in 2014 to create NOS.

PT Comunicações /Portugal Telecom, now Altice Portugal, has also launched its own IPTV service called MEO, after spinning off its subsidiary PT Multimédia (now NOS) in 2007.

Vodafone also launched an IPTV service called Vodafone Casa TV, now just simply known as Vodafone TV.

== Cable ==
All cable providers in Portugal, NOS and Nowo, introduced digital television (DVB-C). However, some providers still offer analog cable.

== Satellite ==
Digital satellite services have existed since 1998. Currently, the providers are NOS and MEO operating in Hispasat.

== Mobile TV ==
All operators had mobile TV under UMTS platforms. It was abandoned in favor of web-TV applications for mobile devices.

== Most-viewed channels ==
=== Yearly viewing shares ===
Yearly average viewing shares of the five main television channels in Portugal since 1992:

- RTP1
- RTP2
- SIC
- TVI
- CMTV
- Others/Cable

=== Monthly viewing shares ===
Monthly viewing shares in October 2026:

Position	Channel	Group (Owner)	Share of total viewing (%)
1	SIC	Impresa	14.1%
2	TVI	Media Capital	13.4%
3	RTP1	RTP	11.9%
4	CMTV	Medialivre	5.7%
5	CNN Portugal	Media Capital	2.6%
6	SIC Notícias	Impresa	2.5%
7	TVI Reality	Media Capital	2.0%
8	News Now	Medialivre	1.8%
9	Star Channel	Disney Portugal	1.8%
10	Canal Hollywood	Dreamia	1.5%
11	Globo	TV Globo	1.5%
12	RTP Notícias	RTP	1.2%
13	SIC Mulher	Impresa	1.1%
14	V+ TVI	Media Capital	1.0%
15	Star Movies	Disney Portugal	0.9%
16	Star Life	Disney Portugal	0.8%
17	SportTV+	Sport TV	0.8%
18	Canal 11	FPF	0.8%
19	Star Crime	Disney Portugal	0.8%
Other Cable / Watched in deferred / Non TV content			33.8%

== Most watched shows ==
Rank	Show	Episode	Rating	Share	Date	Channel
1	UEFA Euro 2004	Portugal vs The Netherlands (semi-final)	40.9	87.2%	30 June 2004	RTP1
2	UEFA Euro 2012	Portugal vs Spain (semi-final)	39.5	76.0%	27 June 2012	SIC
3	UEFA Euro 2004	Portugal vs England (quarter-final)	39.0	85.1%	24 June 2004	RTP1
4	UEFA Euro 2016	Portugal vs Wales (semi-final)	38.4	75.4%	6 July 2016	RTP1
5	UEFA Euro 2016	Portugal vs France (final)	38.2	78.1%	10 July 2016	RTP1
6	UEFA Euro 2012	Portugal vs The Netherlands (group stage match)	38.1	73.4%	17 June 2012	TVI
7	2014 FIFA World Cup	United States vs Portugal (group stage match)	37.8	75.4%	22 June 2014	RTP1
8	UEFA Euro 2004	Portugal vs Greece (final)	37.7	89.7%	4 July 2004	RTP1
9	UEFA Euro 2016	Poland vs Portugal (quarter-final)	37.4	69.9%	30 June 2016	RTP1
10	2006 FIFA World Cup	Portugal vs France (semi-final)	37.2	82.3%	5 July 2006	SIC
11	A Próxima Vítima	Last Episode (Brazilian telenovela)	37.1	80.2%	19 January 1996	SIC
12	UEFA Euro 2012	Czech Republic vs Portugal (quarter-final)	36.1	71.7%	21 June 2012	RTP1
13	UEFA Euro 2004	Russia vs Portugal (group stage match)	35.5	81.4%	16 June 2004	SIC
14	UEFA Euro 2016	Portugal vs Iceland (group stage match)	35.1	68.6%	14 June 2016	RTP1
15	UEFA Euro 2004	Spain vs Portugal (group stage match)	34.9	83.2%	20 June 2004	TVI
16	2006 FIFA World Cup	Portugal vs The Netherlands (round of 16)	34.9	80.7%	25 June 2006	SIC
17	UEFA Euro 2008	Portugal vs Germany (quarter-finals)	34.5	75.6%	19 June 2008	TVI
18	2015 Portuguese legislative election	Debate: António Costa vs. Pedro Passos Coelho	34.1	66%	10 September 2015	RTP1, SIC, TVI
19	2014 FIFA World Cup qualification	Sweden vs Portugal (second leg playoff match)	34.1	62.2%	19 November 2013	RTP1
20	UEFA Europa League	SL Benfica vs Chelsea FC (final)	33.8	62.3%	16 May 2013	SIC
21	UEFA Euro 2000	France vs Portugal (semi-finals)	33.2	76.7%	28 June 2000	RTP1
22	2006 FIFA World Cup	Angola vs Portugal (group stage match)	32.8	80.9%	11 June 2006	SIC
23	UEFA Euro 2012	Germany vs Portugal (group stage match)	32.4	68.3%	9 June 2012	RTP1
24	UEFA Champions League	Monaco vs Porto (final)	31.7	70.5%	26 May 2004	RTP1
25	UEFA Euro 2016	Croatia vs Portugal (round of 16)	31.3	70%	26 June 2016	RTP1
26	UEFA Europa League	Sevilla FC vs SL Benfica (final)	31.1	61.4%	14 May 2014	SIC
27	UEFA Champions League	Real Madrid vs Atlético Madrid (final)	30.8	64.3%	24 May 2014	TVI
28	Terra Nostra	Last Episode (Brazilian telenovela)	30.8	64%	11 January 2000	SIC
29	2006 FIFA World Cup	Portugal vs Iran	30.4	83.1%	17 June 2006	SIC
30	UEFA Europa League	Juventus FC vs SL Benfica (semi-final)	30.4	58.9%	1 May 2014	SIC
31	Big Brother Portugal	Live eviction show	30.2	72.5%	26 December 2000	TVI
32	UEFA Cup	Sporting CP vs CSKA Moscow (final)	30.1	68.4%	18 May 2005	RTP1
33	Taça de Portugal	SL Benfica vs Sporting CP (sixth round)	29.9	62.6%	26 January 2005	RTP1
34	Torre de Babel	Last Episode (Brazilian telenovela)	29.8	77.1%	2 April 1999	SIC
35	UEFA Euro 2008	Switzerland vs Portugal	29.8	71.8%	15 June 2008	TVI
36	UEFA Cup	Celtic FC vs FC Porto	29.7	67.5%	21 May 2003	SIC
37	2006 FIFA World Cup	Germany vs Portugal (third place play-off)	29.6	78.4%	8 July 2006	SIC
38	2006 FIFA World Cup	England vs Portugal (quarter-finals)	29.2	88.1%	1 July 2006	SIC
39	UEFA Champions League	Barcelona vs Benfica (quarter-finals)	29.3	65.6%	5 April 2006	RTP1
40	2010 FIFA World Cup	Spain vs Portugal (round of 16)	29.1	75.9%	29 June 2010	RTP1
47	Médico de Família (source: Sociedade Independente de Comunicação)	(Last Episode) Portuguese TV series (Most watched Portuguese TV production - all genres / formats (source: Sociedade Independente de Comunicação)	27.9 (source: Sociedade Independente de Comunicação)	61.4% (source: Sociedade Independente de Comunicação)	16 March 1999 (source: Sociedade Independente de Comunicação)	SIC (source: Sociedade Independente de Comunicação)

== Age ratings ==
Icon	Description
	Todos (Everyone) - no age restrictions.
	10 AP (+10 - Parental Advisory) - for viewers above 10 (with parental advisory required for people under 10).
	12 AP (+12 - Parental Advisory) - for viewers above 12 (with parental advisory required for people under 12).
	16 - for viewers above 16 only. Programs with this age rating can only be broadcast from 10:30 p.m. to 6:00 a.m.

== See also ==
- List of Portuguese language television channels
- List of television stations in Portugal
- Mass media in Portugal
- List of newspapers in Portugal
- List of radio stations in Portugal
- Internet in Portugal
- Telecommunications in Portugal

== Bibliography ==
- Nelson Traquina (1995). "Portuguese Television: The Politics of Savage Deregulation". Media, Culture & Society. 17.
