= Se Bem Me Lembro =

Portuguese television program

Se Bem Me Lembro is a Portuguese television program that was aired by RTP from April 8, 1969 to October 5, 1975.

It was presented by Azorean-born poet Vitorino Nemésio, exibida entre 1969 e 1975, in which he demonstrated all of his eloquence and gift as a communicator. The name of the program was given by the presenter as a sign of the importance of memory. In 1974, the program, which used to be weekly, became fortnightly, before disappearing completely in 1975. Beginning in 1972, the series was also broadcast on the newly inaugurated RTP Madeira, being one of the programs seen on its opening night.

The extensive popularity of the program during its six years on air made Nemésio a household name, with Se Bem Me Lembro being remembered due to its success, rather than his literary works and essays.
