= RTP África =

- Country: Portugal
- Broadcast area: Lusophone Africa (Angola, Cape Verde, Equatorial Guinea, Guinea-Bissau, Mozambique and São Tomé and Príncipe)

Programming
- Picture format: 576i SDTV

Ownership
- Owner: RTP
- Sister channels: RTP1; RTP2; RTP Notícias; RTP Desporto; RTP Memória; RTP Açores; RTP Madeira; RTP Mundo; RTP Zig Zag

History
- Launched: 7 January 1998; 28 years ago

Links
- Website: RTP África

Availability

Terrestrial
- Cabo Verde Broadcast: Channel 4

Streaming media
- RTP Play: www.rtp.pt/play/direto/rtpafrica

RTP África is a Portuguese television channel owned and operated by state-owned public broadcaster Rádio e Televisão de Portugal (RTP). It is available in the Portuguese-speaking African countries, where it is available as a basic cable and satellite channel, with the exception of Cabo Verde, where it is available as a free-to-air channel, distributed by the country's digital terrestrial television network. RTP África is also available for free on RTP's platform RTP Play.

Its programming comes from the Portuguese public and private television channels and African public networks, RTP África also airs its own news, food and music TV shows. The channel is especially developed for the African communities and the cultural interchange between them and Portugal and for the Portuguese populations of Lusophone Africa. Until 2016, due to a protocol, the channel also transmitted programs from the United Nations dubbed in Portuguese in some breaks.

== History ==
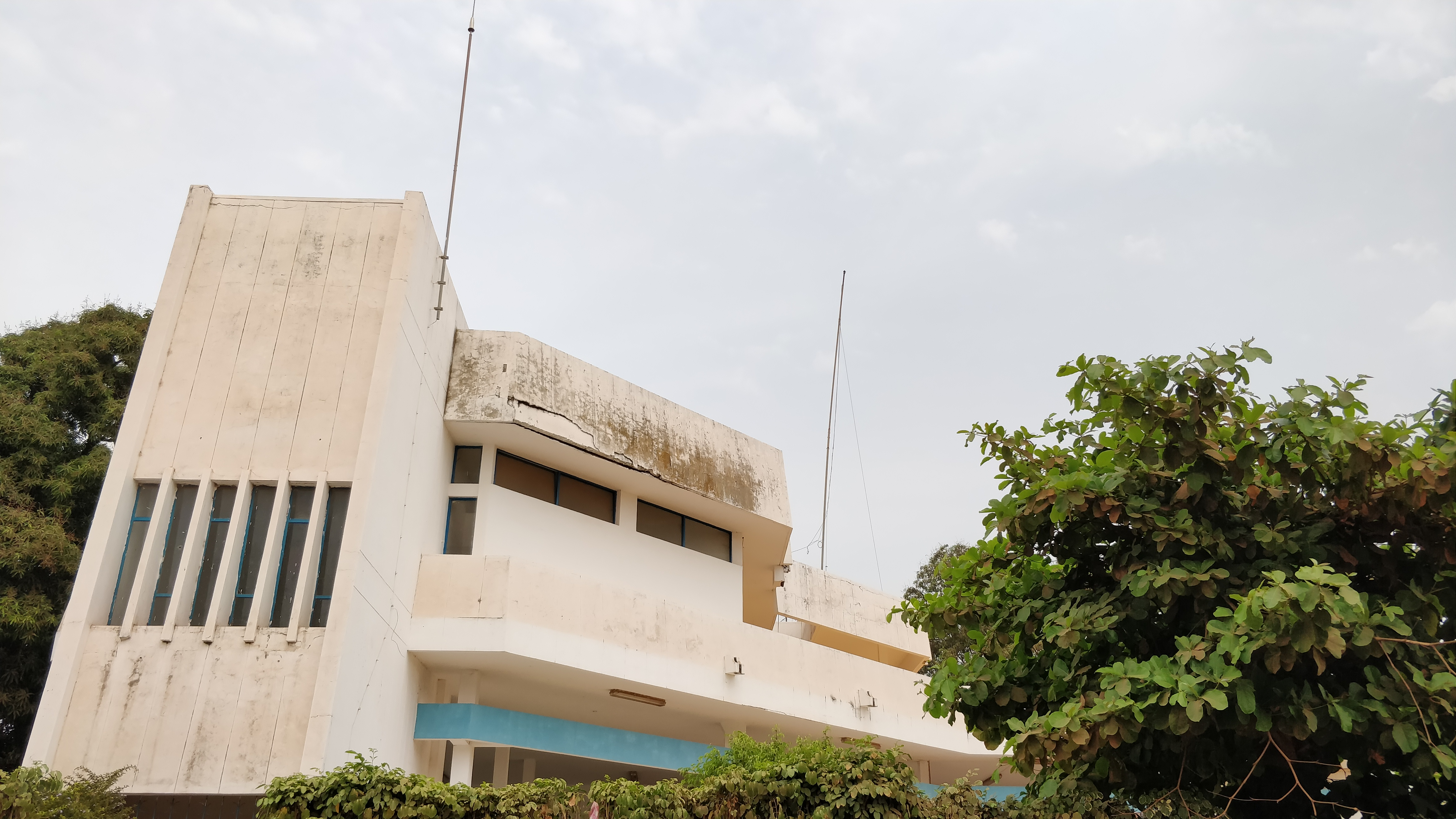
Combined RDP-RTP África delegation in Bissau

A special broadcast was held on 7 March 1997 - the date of the 40th anniversary of RTP - as the announcement of the project, which would later become a channel of its own, took place. The service would be broadcast by satellite using RTP Internacional's frequency four hours a day, subsequently evolving “with a balanced distribution of information programs, of an educational nature and covering various genres, such as documentaries, musical and cultural”. The new service would give a strong impetus for co-operation between Portugal and Lusophone African countries. A few weeks earlier, preparations started for the building of the delegations in the capitals of the five African countries involved. On 16 February, the Cape Verdean delegation in Praia was inaugurated, with the presence of the presidents of both Portugal and Cape Verde, in the following day, both presidents were interviewed in an RTP Internacional program, Na Ponta da Língua. The five delegations had, at launch, the following employees under their control: Henrique de Vasconcelos in charge of Praia; Ramiro Mendes in charge of Luanda; Fernando Gomes in charge of Bissau; Paulo Costa in charge of São Tomé and Rosabela Afonso, with assistant Luís Fernandes, in charge of Maputo. Each delegation was in charge of producing original content for the channel. At this point, it was suggested that both SIC and TVI should make their programs available for RTP África. If such happened, RTP Internacional would also screen its content. As 1997 continued, the plans to separate RTP África from RTP Internacional, aiming to create a separate channel, had consolidated.

The channel was launched on 7 January 1998. For the launch of the channel, it programmed a 13-part documentary series about Cape Verdean poets (O Povo das Ilhas), co-produced with the Cape Verdean partner, three original productions: Fórum RTP África (currently Fórum África), Repórter RTP África (currently Repórter África) and Estádio RTP África (currently África Sport). These programs relied heavily on NET-RTP, which was the co-operation framework RTP set up with partners in the African countries. The channel was opened by Patrícia Bull, the launch day also included a pre-recorded speech by Jorge Sampaio and an inaugural session from the Belém Cultural Center. At the time of launch, RTP África was the most technologically advanced out of the six RTP channels. The channel launched on cable in Portugal on 6 March 1998, following requests from the African diaspora communities.

In September 2007, RTP África started broadcasting on Intelsat 907 after signing a new deal with Intelsat.

In 2011, RTP África underwent a repositioning and rebranding process, which was ultimately achieved in January 2012. This included a new logo (with the RTP stripes rearranged to form a map of Africa), a new slogan (Vários mundos, uma só língua) and new programs that were put under RTP's public service contracts: Viva Saúde (health), Mar de Letras (literature) and Disco África (music). One of its existing programs, Nha terra Nha cretcheu, was in the process of reformulation and improvement.

RTP announced the launch of the channel to the Portuguese terrestrial platform in November 2020, as of 2025, this hasn't been achieved yet.

Isabel Costa was the director of the channel until June 30, 2025. Since July 1, 2025, the post of the channel has been absorbed by a general directorate for RTP1, RTP Internacional and RTP África, here presided by José Fragoso.

== Programming ==
Unlike RTP Internacional, which largely depends on RTP1 and RTP2, RTP África tents to have its own line of programming, depending on its offices in Africa, and, in early years, also relayed programs from the state channels of Lusophone Africa.

The channels' primetime news program, Repórter África, focus on independent daily news for the five African countries, often the only independent news source in these countries and it has been criticised by some regimes, namely São Tomé and Príncipe and the former regime of Guinea-Bissau, in the latter the channel was put off air for some weeks due to its "uncontrolled" news broadcasts although currently there are no problems. Fórum Africa is a weekly interview program produced between the five African delegations of RTP.

Música d'África transmitting from Mozambique is the channel's music show with African music videoclips and reports. Local music shows are also broadcast Massave from Mozambique and Top Crioulo from Cape Verde. Artes e Espéctáculos the arts show of the channel transmitting from Cape Verde and Latitudes is a cultural program issuing the African immigrant communities in Portugal.

The channel also transmits Portuguese-language soap operas, films, series, documentaries and African entertainment shows. In Africa the channel is best known for the Portuguese Liga broadcasts, given the fact that in these countries most football fans are supporters of Benfica, Sporting or Porto. The channel also gained fame for its São Tomean (Na Roça com os Tachos, international title: The Cooking of the Enchanted Islands, 2004) and Angolan (Moamba) cuisine shows.
