= RTP Desporto =

Sports division of RTP in Portugal

- Company type: Sports Division of RTP
- Headquarters: Lisbon, Portugal, Portugal
- Area served: Portugal
- Services: Radio and television broadcasts
- Owner: Rádio e Televisão de Portugal
- Website: rtp.pt/desporto

RTP Desporto is the sports division of the Rádio e Televisão de Portugal (RTP). It is controlled by News division of RTP. Its flagship programming is the National Football Team matches.

The official website of RTP Desporto is rtp.pt/desporto, and one of the most visited of the News division of the RTP website.

Radio coverage of RTP is mostly on RTP Antena 1. RTP also offers HDTV coverage.

== Streaming channels ==
RTP Desporto
- Country: Portugal
- Broadcast area: Portugal
- Headquarters: Lisbon; Porto

Programming
- Picture format: Resolution: 1080p (HDTV); Aspect Ratio: 16:9

Ownership
- Owner: Rádio e Televisão de Portugal
- Sister channels: RTP1; RTP2; RTP Notícias; RTP Memória; RTP Açores; RTP Madeira; RTP África; RTP Mundo; RTP Zig Zag

History
- Launched: February 2019

Links
- Website: Official website

Availability

Streaming media
- RTP Play: RTP Desporto 1 RTP Desporto 2 RTP Desporto 3 RTP Desporto 4 (All channels only available in Portugal)

In 2019, RTP launched a number of pop-up channels dedicated to sports on its streaming service, RTP Play. The RTP Desporto channels opened with the coverage of the UEFA Women's Futsal Euro 2019 final four round in Gondomar.

== TV Rights ==
=== Football ===
Competition/Tournament/Event	Channels/Platform	Summary
Primeira Liga	RTP Internacional, RTP África	One match per week live. Licensed from Sport TV.
Taça de Portugal	RTP1	Two matches per stage and final live until 2025-26
European Qualifiers	RTP1	Live coverage of Portugal NT's qualifying matches for the UEFA Euro 2024.
UEFA Nations League	RTP1	Portugal matches plus final. Until (at least) 2022-2023.
UEFA Friendlies	RTP1	Live coverage of Portugal matches until (at least) 2024.

=== Motor racing ===
For several years, RTP was the home of motor racing broadcasts in Portugal but now the only motorsports competition on RTP is the Rally de Portugal.

=== Olympics ===
RTP holds exclusive rights to broadcast the Olympics on free-to-air terrestrial television. RTP broadcasts a major coverage during the Summer Olympics, while during the Winter Olympics only highlights are shown.

Competition/Tournament/Event	Channel/Platform	Summary
2024 Summer Olympics	RTP1, RTP2	200 hours of live coverage sub-licensed from Eurosport.
2026 Winter Olympics	RTP2	Highlights.
2028 Summer Olympics	RTP1, RTP2	At least 200 hours of live coverage.
2030 Winter Olympics	RTP2	Highlights.
2032 Summer Olympics	RTP1, RTP2	At least 200 hours of live coverage.

=== Athletics ===
For several years, RTP has followed the tracks of Portuguese athletes in athletics. The major international athletics competitions are all broadcast on RTP, with supplementary coverage by Eurosport. The events are: IAAF World Championships in Athletics, European Athletics Championships and World Championship on Indoor surfaces. RTP also broadcasts some local events such as the Meia-Maratona de Lisboa and Meia-Maratona do Porto. RTP has also access to highlights of the Portuguese Championship.

Competition/Tournament/Event	Channel/Platform	Summary
2022 World Athletics Championships	RTP2, RTP Play	
2022 European Athletics Championships	RTP2	
2022 World Athletics Indoor Championships	RTP2	

=== Cycling ===
Competition/Tournament/Event	Channel/Platform	Summary
Volta a Portugal	RTP1	
Tour de France	RTP2	

=== Basketball ===
RTP is currently broadcast the LPB, Taça de Portugal, Super Taça, selected national team qualifiers, Portugal clubs at the women's Euro Cup, and many more through national 2 and both regional (Madeira and Açores) channels.

=== Futsal ===
RTP broadcasts one game per week of the Portuguese Futsal League and its playoffs in its entirety. European Championships are also broadcast, such as the UEFA Futsal Cup.

Competition/Tournament	Summary
FIFA Futsal World Cup	Exclusive live coverage on 1 (Portugal matches only (if involved)), 2 (selected non-Portugal matches, including up to both semi finals and up to both finals (3rd/4th place and 1st/2nd place matches)), and RTP Play (all 52 matches), in 2021.
2021 UEFA Under-19 Futsal Championship	Exclusive live coverage on RTP1 (Portugal matches only) and RTP Play (all 15 matches)

== Previous coverage ==
=== Football ===
RTP broadcast during almost 50 years the Portuguese Liga, broadcasting several games a week. However, in 2004, when SportTV took total control of Liga's rights, they sold a two-year, 32-game package to TVI, a decision that was not appreciated be football fans, as many consider that the TVI sports division does not have the quality to cover a big league.

RTP recovered Liga's rights in 2008, for an undisclosed fee (the only that was known, is that RTP gave a fee plus some sports rights that they were not going to be used, since they didn't have programming slots available for them at that time). RTP's bid and victory was cheered by football fans, as they consider the RTP's coverage in the 2000s, superior to the TVI one. However this bid was criticized by politicians who thought and saw this as a waste of money by a public service corporation. RTP again lost the rights for Liga's coverage, when TVI outbid their controversial 20 million euros bid.

During a brief period of two years, RTP also had no access to the national football team events (events that they used to broadcast since 1957), since TVI won the right for the 2008–2010 period, which included the 2010 World Cup qualifying campaign. In 2010, RTP recovered the rights to broadcast the national team events.

It also broadcast the UEFA Europa League (when it was called UEFA Cup); however, SIC outbid them in 2009.

Most of the RTP's staples was also the UEFA Champions League and UEFA European Championship finals. However, due to excessive budget cuts, RTP decided not to submit an offer to UEFA's ITT, a decision that TVI all alone for the FTA rights ITT of the competition. TVI would eventually get the rights, although pages would spread across social networks asking for RTP to get the rights back at the next ITT, due to the poor quality of TVI's coverage compared to the RTP 1.

=== Motorsport ===
In Motorsport, RTP lost almost all of important competition rights, such as Formula 1, MotoGP, WRC (lost to SportTV) and the Dakar Rally (lost to TVI).

=== Rugby union ===
On rare occasions RTP broadcast Portuguese Rugby Union Championship matches. However they had totally disappeared from RTP schedules since 2004.

There was also a controversy in 2007, when CDS-PP, a center-right party, wanted RTP to broadcast the 2007 Rugby World Cup, since Portugal had qualified for it. However RTP administrators said the network would not broadcast the event, since they do not have the rights, and since the rights holders (SportTV) did not want to sell them.

=== Tennis ===
RTP does not give much airtime to tennis. They broadcast a few highlights on Portuguese minor competitions and they used fully broadcast the Estoril Open.

== Radio sports rights ==
RTP has exclusive radio rights for the UEFA Champions League, UEFA Europa League and Portugal national football team matches. RTP also broadcast exclusively the 2006 FIFA World Cup and 2010 FIFA World Cup on radio.

== See also ==
- Rádio e Televisão de Portugal
- RTP1
- RTP2
- RTP Notícias
