= RTP Açores =

- Country: Portugal
- Broadcast area: Azores (terrestrial); National (subscription television)
- Headquarters: Ponta Delgada

Programming
- Picture format: Resolution: 576i (SDTV); Aspect Ratio: 16:9

Ownership
- Owner: Rádio e Televisão de Portugal
- Sister channels: RTP1; RTP2; RTP Notícias; RTP Desporto; RTP Memória; RTP Madeira; RTP África; RTP Mundo; RTP Zig Zag

History
- Launched: 10 August 1975; 50 years ago

Links
- Website: acores.rtp.pt

Availability

Terrestrial
- TDT: Channel 5 (only in Azores)

Streaming media
- RTP Play: http://www.rtp.pt/play/direto/rtpacores

RTP Açores is a Portuguese free-to-air regional television channel owned and operated by state-owned public broadcaster Rádio e Televisão de Portugal (RTP) in the Autonomous Region of the Azores. It began broadcasting on 10 August 1975 from its studios in Ponta Delgada. Since late 2017, it broadcasts from its current premises, alongside RDP Açores. The line-up consists of local programming, relays of RTP Notícias and reruns of programming from the mainland channels.

== History ==
=== Buildup ===
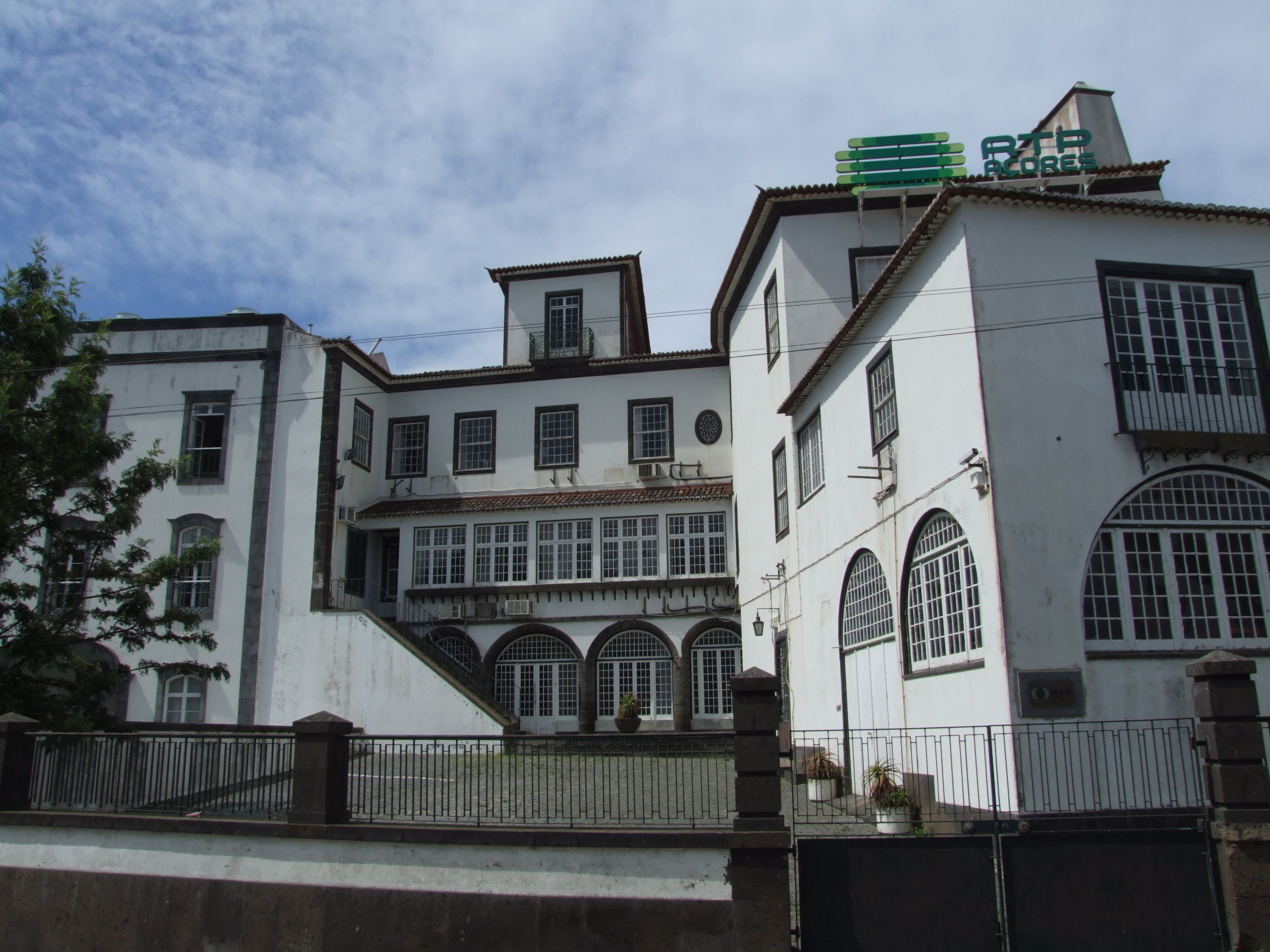
The former broadcast studio/headquarters of RTP Açores in Ponta Delgada

In 1964, a television coverage project for the Azores appeared, under the hands of RTP engineer João Paz. However, due to supposed lack of money at RTP, the project was halted.

In 1975, during the transformative phase of Portugal's transition from Estado Novo regime to the Third Portuguese Republic, Ramalho Eanes, then president of the administrative council at RTP (and president of Portugal from 1976 to 1986) solicited a dossier already published by João Paz on the future of regional broadcasting, then referred to as RTP-Açores. After studying the process, its implications and conditions, Ramalho Eanes informed António Borges Coutinho that this project would be implemented swiftly.

Along with Sousa Gomes and Sidónio Paes, the administrative council saw the public station in the Azores: "...as to contribute to the eradication of illiteracy...an instrument for education and culture...an instrument to promote cultural democracy...a vehicle that contributed to a better knowledge for all citizens...a means to appeal to unity and social responsibility for all...and a contribution that [served] positive collaboration in the transition and institutionalization of democracy".

Instability at the national/regional levels and the move towards more autonomy and independence meant that RTP's motives were met with anxiety and distrust, the national broadcaster at that time being a tool of the Armed Forces Movement (MFA). In the streets of Ponta Delgada, for example, local cultural brigades were already trying to mould values and guide the transformation towards democracy.

Following the Carnation Revolution, the move towards a decentralized constitution, with an autonomous status for regional authorities, the island of São Miguel in the archipelago of the Azores, was chosen for the broadcasting centre. Local news and entertainment was broadcast from its first studios in a building in the outskirts of the urban area of Ponta Delgada, in the locality of São Gonçalo. Transmitters were installed at Serra da Barrosa and its provisional studio was used for the Telescola project from the mainland, which had reached the Azores before 1974.

The station broadcast on channel 7 from the Pico da Barrosã transmitter and channel 9 from Santa Bárbara. Additional relays at launch time were located at Ajuda (channel 11), Cume (channel 4), Pico (channel 5), Pico Alto (channel 10) and Salto do Cavalo (channel 11). Television was not new to the Azores, as the Armed Forces Radio and Television Service operated a TV station at the Lajes Air Base (CSL-TV, channel 8) in the NTSC standard since 1954.

Its first director was Fernando Balsinha, who entered RTP in 1973. When his stint at RTP Açores ended, he returned to Lisbon, working for its news department, being the foreign relations head at the time of his death in 2003. The station was already delivering test broadcasts days ahead of the 10 August launch.

=== First broadcast ===
Following some adaptations of the spaces, the first broadcast was aired on 10 August 1975, and lasted six hours. The first broadcast began at 3:30 in the afternoon, wuth the first face seen after the RTP start-up video being that of continuity announcer Ana Maria Cordeiro, followed by a speech by President of the Board of Governors, General Altino Pinto de Magalhães, and lasted until 9:30, at the end of a newscast. This first transmission was marked by several gaffes, firstly by General Pinto (who was thrust into the position of regional leader only months earlier), then in the transmission of the programming, that included General à Força. After this film, Telejornal published local/regional and national news (already two days late) before a caption appearing to round out the schedule, stating "Silence...we are going to laugh". At the conclusion of this first broadcast, a technical flaw did not permit the playing of the national anthem, resulting in one viewer calling in to berate the studio, stating "...this here is still Portugal".

One of the programs shown on launch day, the Polish series Chłopi (The Peasants), caused controversy among the viewing audience, ostensibly due to the behavior portrayed. The channel employed a staff of about 20 people, and broadcast Tuesdays to Sundays from 19:00 to 22:00, with the employees taking a day off on Monday.

During these early broadcasts, the regional operator produced three hours of daily broadcasts per day for two months. In the successive years, the Azoreans began to trust the local broadcasters, with improvements made to the functioning of the service, including the operation of the Estação Terrena de Satélites da Marconi, which allowed signals from the continent to reach the Azores directly (rather than time-delay broadcasts). But, coverage was not even, as many of the islands were not covered, and many of the programming was still delivered from the continent and the content was censored, due to concerns for "public morality". Satellite connections started in 1977, enabling Azoreans access to real-time programming from the mainland, followed by offices in Horta in January 1978 and Angra do Heroísmo in April 1979. As of 1977, RTP Açores covered 60% of the population.

=== Modernization ===
The 1980 Terceira earthquake heavily damaged the local RTP office, losing crucial equipment. A short-term solution was made for the office and it later made a special program for the first anniversary of the quake the following year. Satellite broadcasts from a Marconi satellite earth station started on 16 November 1980. Work for a new relay station at Pico do Bartolomeu went underway in 1984, bringing coverage to the north-eastern area of São Miguel.

Even so, television in the Azores was seen a "mirror" on Azorean culture, and a "window" on the other islands of the archipelago. This changed during the administration of Lopes Araújo; in July 1984, after completing a course in Law on the continent, he returned to the Azores, and at the age of 26, assumed an approach to revitalize regional programming and promote RTP Açores internationally. He contracted new professionals (such as producer José Medieros), produced programming directed towards the Azorean population and links to the diaspora in the United States. This included transmitting direct from Ponta Delgada, via satellite, the festivals of Senhor Santo Cristo dos Milagres in 1985, as well as broadcasting the news from the Azores to services in North America, Canada and Bermuda, starting in 1987. 1985 was also marked by the inaugural Mostra Atlântica da Televisão festival created in Horta, followed by the Açor de Ouro prize in 1988. The tenth anniversary of RTP Açores was also an occasion for the channel to increase its local output, with such productions like Pedras Brancas, Memórias do Vale and Domingos Monteiro's documentary Açores.

The signal's reached increased to cover the islands of Flores and Corvo in 1988.

Programming during this period began to diversify and became more polished, with a concentration on information programming (Jornal de Sábado, Notícias, Sumário), entertainment (with talk shows like Aqui Açores and Gente Nossa) and the beginning of the production of fiction programming. Until this time, production of fictional storytelling was not full-developed; Lopes de Araújo considered this "the noble stage of production", due to the demands on people, technical requirements and financial means, in addition to a level of experience and maturity necessary to realize large productions. To this, in July 1986, the Regional Centre of the Azores produced Xailes Negros (a mini-series) which attempted break the mould and provide dynamic fiction and story-telling, from scratch, while other productions have moved to adapt pre-existing public literature and works by celebrated Azorean authors. Xailes Negros also bagged awards. In 1987, for the 500th anniversary of the discovery of the islands, RTP Açores produced Balada do Atlântico. Footage dispatched to stations in the United States, Canada and Bermuda, Notícias dos Açores, attracted between 350,000 and 700,000 viewers of Azorean descent. New current affairs programs were introduced in 1988, as well as test broadcasts to Flores and Corvo, up until then the only areas of Portugal that still had no television. Corvo residents did have a makeshift service in the mid-80s, which aired videotaped RTP programs, as well as telenovelas that had not reached RTP Açores yet. At the time, the closest RTP Açores signal was available from Terceira and was received in black and white. When satellite dishes and later RTP Açores' signal became viable options for television, the shadow service lost steam.

Continuous broadcasts from 12:00 to closedown started in 1989. It was up to the station to broadcast the official acts of Portugal Day 1989 which were held in Ponta Delgada, for the national RTP network. Reports compiled by RTP Açores reporters sent to the United States, Canada and Brazil led to the creation of the documentary Os Açorianos no Novo Mundo, about Azorean immigration to these countries. Also in June 1989, a special edition of Fim-de-Semana featured inserts from all nine islands. That same year, the new Terceira office opened, nine years after the quake.

=== The 90s ===
RTP Açores was developed further in 1990, with the improvement of working conditions and an average schedule lasting close to fourteen hours a day. Morning programming started on weekends, as well as more active contribution from Faial and Terceira.

In 1995, the channel observed its twentieth anniversary under financial constraints. That year, it aired the local series O Feiticeiro do Vento by José Medeiros. For the eleventh Mostra Atlântica de Televisão in Angra do Heroísmo in November, it held the first underwater interview in Portuguese television history.

In 1998, RTP1's terrestrial relay network was being implemented in the archipelago.

=== The 2000s ===
At the turn of the millennium, RTP Açores had its audience share decrease, due to the arrival of RTP1 to terrestrial transmitters and the increased penetration of cable in urban areas. A restructuring plan, first drafted in 1999, was expected to be approved by Lisbon, but as of January 2000, it was pending approval. Its excess of news (such as the national Telejornal followed by Telejornal Açores) gave the channel the nickname of "CNN de bairro" ("a neighborhood CNN"). Its news reports were heavily criticized, bordering on absurd, and concerns that the channel would lose its autonomy were on the rise. The Azorean Government wanted to become a shareholder at the station in February 2000, with the creation of a regional public media holding, whose aim was to grant autonomy. By 2003, the amount of RTP2 programs surpassed that of RTP1, while over 2,000 hours of content that year were given to news and current affairs programming.

An anniversary book was released on 10 August 2005, written by station journalist Emanuel Carreiro. A special ceremony was scheduled for 12 November.

Its heads of news quit RTP Açores in November 2007 due to divergences with director Pedro Bicudo, the reasons were largely political, chief among them the refusal of airing footage of a PS Azores dinner which included Carlos César.

=== Crisis ===
A fire destroyed its long-vacated old facilities in Ponta Delgada on February 11, 2011.

A 2011 survey said that while SIC and TVI were the most viewed channels of the Azores, locals still preferred RTP1 and RTP Açores, especially for the news. On June 4, 2012, due to budget constraints, RTP Açores reduced its schedule to six hours a day (17:30 to 23:30). This led to a massive deconstruction of the schedule it had before. The cut in airtime to just seven hours was strongly criticized by locals, who, per a sample of 800 Azoreans per a telephone survey conducted by Norma Açores, gave high approval to the channel and its programming.

Miguel Relvas announced a cut in its programming to four hours a day (19:00 to 23:00) in late August 2011, in order to cut €13 million. Director Pedro Bicudo left on October 14, 2011 due to RTP's restructuring but without mentioning further details. The new schedule was put into place on June 4, 2012, with a six-hour schedule (17:30 to 23:30) instead of the initial four-hour plan. There was no reliable ratings data in 2012, as ratings were only limited to the mainland.

=== National coverage ===
The channel launched nationwide on cable and satellite providers on 7 May 2015 on MEO, NOS and Vodafone, and on the remaining providers the following day during the Feast of the Lord Holy Christ of the Miracles. The plans stated that RTP Açores was going to launch on these providers until August 2015, coinciding with the channel's fortieth anniversary.

=== New facilities ===
On 30 August 2016, RTP Açores invested 2,5 million euros in its first virtual studio, at a former school located in Praia da Vitória, Terceira. The new Ponta Delgada facility was inaugurated on December 4, 2017.

International distribution off the channel began in 2018, specifically to the United States and Bermuda, where Azorean diaspora communities are present.

High definition broadcasts started in 2021.

== Programs ==
Before the 2012 cuts, RTP Açores had a varied schedule, consisting of a mix of original local programs, programs produced for the mainland's RTP channels and a handful of imports first seen on the mainland networks.

The main program is Telejornal Açores, which also includes a standalone weather bulletin. Jornal da Tarde was relayed live from RTP1 in the past. Other programs included Bom Dia Açores (which ended in the 2012 reforms), Açores & Negócios, Atlântida Açores (a Madeira version also exists; both are also aired on RTP Internacional), Lançamento (sports), Acores.RTP.pt (connecting the diaspora through the internet), Troféu (sports news), Sabores das Ilhas (cooking), Açores VIP (produced by Amuleto), Máquinas (produced by Promoverde) and Teledesporto (weekly sports news program).

The channel had a children's slot airing imported series previously broadcast on RTP2. In March 2012, the channel aired Baby Looney Tunes, Blinky Bill, Contraptus, The Garfield Show and Shaun the Sheep.

In April 2020, during the first lockdown, the channel started airing televised classes of its own, in accordance with the Azorean educational system, and to counter school closures.

As of 2023, in addition to hours of RTP3 relays and original programming, the channel repeats programs produced by the mainland channels RTP1 and RTP2.
