= RTP Madeira =

- Country: Portugal
- Broadcast area: Madeira
- Headquarters: Funchal; Lisbon (playout, since 1 July 2025)

Programming
- Picture format: Resolution: 576i (SDTV); Aspect Ratio: 16:9

Ownership
- Owner: Rádio e Televisão de Portugal
- Sister channels: RTP1; RTP2; RTP Notícias; RTP Desporto; RTP Memória; RTP Açores; RTP África; RTP Mundo; RTP Zig Zag

History
- Launched: 6 August 1972; 53 years ago

Links
- Website: rtp.pt/madeira

Availability

Terrestrial
- TDT Madeira: Channel 5

Streaming media
- RTP Play: http://www.rtp.pt/play/direto/rtpmadeira

RTP Madeira is a Portuguese free-to-air regional television channel owned and operated by state-owned public broadcaster Rádio e Televisão de Portugal (RTP) in the Autonomous Region of Madeira. It began broadcasting on 6 August 1972.

It is broadcast in the Madeira Islands and via cable and satellite in the Azores Islands and continental Portugal.

== History ==
At a meeting of the RTP Board of Directors in 1962, it was approved, that a meeting should be held with the firm Ramos & Ramos, in order to better clarify its proposal on Television in Madeira." No development about this case is known, but what is known is that was a mere proposal that never went past the government. The same fate befell a project presented by filmmaker António da Cunha Telles (born in Madeira) which envisaged the creation of a company, Radiotelevisão Madeirense, to exploit TV in the archipelago, although in close collaboration and understanding with RTP.

RTP planned the start of a television service in Madeira as early as 1971, but the building of the transmitters was delayed due to adverse climatic conditions. At the end of 1971, it was announced that the service would be set up at the end of the first semester of 1971. The first experimental broadcasts were conducted on 30 June 1972, with regular broadcasts starting on 6 August.

The main work was carried out in the 4 locations selected for assembling the transmitter and relays. The main location, at Pico do Silva (Camacha parish), at 1,111 m. altitude, in addition to the building to house the transmitter (2 kW), emergency generating set and other equipment, a 75 m metal tower was erected. At its top, an antenna system connected by coaxial cable to the transmitter allowed radiating 20 kW to be radiated. The 3 original relays, Cabo Girão, Facho (Machico) and Arco da Calheta, relayed the signal received from the main transmitter and the entire transmitter group reached around 60% of the population of the island of Madeira and a significant part of that of Porto Santo.

The initial headquarters were located in the Rua das Maravilhas street in Funchal, in an old building that had just been adapted to function as a residential building. Work started to accommodate the new station (which was to follow in the coming years) to obtain the necessary room for the equipment, of which telecine machines and videotapes were essential parts, given the characteristics of the programming that was going to air; a small studio equipped with a camera (which had been a telecine camera, but which had been ingeniously adapted for its new function); an equally tiny editorial room; and offices for writers, producer-coordinators, maintenance, etc. The possibility of using satellite connections was still distant (this was only achieved in 1982), the remaining resource was to get the programming – the “canned content” – that arrived by air. One-inch magnetic supports and film reels were received in Santa Catarina; they would then travel by car to Funchal; they were then minimally controlled; and, finally, they were put “on air” by studio equipment. Only the live, studio shots of the continuity announcer and the journalist who presented the news service were of local origin, illustrated with images from the news broadcast the day before on the mainland.

The first experimental broadcasts were held on April 1, 1972 at 9:30pm. Official tests were held on June 30. RTP Madeira started regular broadcasting on August 6, 1972, a Sunday. In its initial phase, broadcasts ran from 7:30pm to midnight. The station broadcast on channel 5 from the Pico do Silva transmitter.

The running order for the first day, opening earlier at 3pm, consisted of the following programs:

- The Adventures of Robin Hood;
- a feature film;
- Lassie;
- Se Bem me Lembro, a program presented by Vitorino Nemésio, and broadcast at the time in the mainland;
- Teledesporto;
- a studio link with Moreira Baptista congratulating the launch of the station;
- Telejornal at 9:30pm, with news from the previous day coming in from the mainland from a TAP plane;
- the final of the 1972 Roller Hockey World Cup on tape delay;
- finishing the schedule, an episode of Longstreet.

Few people owned a TV set at the time. Those who did own received the signal of the TVE station from the Canary Islands (TVE Canarias) in days of good tropospheric propagation.

Satellite broadcasts from a Marconi satellite earth station started on 16 November 1980. This enabled RTP Madeira to broadcast content from the mainland live.

In the 1980s, and with the support of the Regional Government, a plan aimed at extending the coverage to the entirety of the islands began, with the inauguration of the following transmitters:

- 1980: Portela and São Jorge, extending reception to the north coast of Madeira;
- 1981: Ribeira Brava and Encumeada relays;
- 1984: Gaula, Fajã da Ovelha, Paul do Mar and Terça de Porto Moniz, which completed the third phase of the coverage plan;
- 1985: Ponta Delgada;
- 1986: Curral das Freiras;
- 1987: Porto Santo, thus achieving coverage of around 100%.

Production of a Jeux Sans Frontières heat in Funchal was made for the Eurovision network in 1982 with a local presenter (Maria João Carreira) joining the Portuguese presenters Eládio Clímaco and Alice Cruz.

Armindo Abreu became the new director of RTP Madeira in 1987. Under his management, local production increased.

Continuous broadcasts from 12:00 to closedown started in 1989, where RTP Madeira's local production had increased by 50% in relation to the previous year. Work on the new facilities started in 1990, with the aim of leaving the old Rua das Maravilhas facilities.

In July 1997, RTP Madeira started relaying Telejornal from RTP1 while its news bulletin, at 9pm, was now concentrating exclusively on local affairs. Local programming increased as well, creating programs also relayed on RTP Internacional.

In March 2015, RTP announced that both RTP Madeira and RTP Açores would start nationwide carriage on cable operators, with RTP Madeira being the first to do so, on March 7, coinciding with RTP's 58th anniversary. For the occasion, a special schedule was announced, starting at 8am.

The cuts in cabinets at RTP in June 2025 caused a series of changes. On June 26, it was announced that the channel's playout would move from Funchal to Lisbon. The Madeiran parties demand transparency. The move was done on July 1; on June 30, deputees from PS, PSD and JPP complained about these issues and criticized its lack of autonomy.
