= Free-to-air =

Television and radio broadcasting in unencrypted form

Free-to-air (FTA) services are television (TV) and radio services broadcast in unencrypted form, allowing any person with the appropriate receiving equipment to receive the signal and view or listen to the content without requiring a subscription, other ongoing cost, or one-off fee (e.g., pay-per-view). In the traditional sense, this is carried on terrestrial radio signals and received with an antenna.

FTA also refers to channels and broadcasters providing content for which no subscription is expected, even though they may be delivered to the viewer/listener by another carrier for which a subscription is required, e.g., cable television, the Internet, or satellite. These carriers may be mandated (or opt) in some geographies to deliver FTA channels even if a premium subscription is not present (providing the necessary equipment is still available), especially where FTA channels are expected to be used for emergency broadcasts, similar to the mandatory emergency phone number service provided by mobile phone operators and manufacturers.

Free-to-view (FTV), on the other hand, is generally available without a subscription, but it is digitally encoded (often requiring a proprietary device or software to decode the signal, such as VideoGuard) and may be restricted geographically. Free-to-air is often used for international broadcasting, making its coverage similar to that of shortwave radio. Most FTA retailers list free-to-air channel guides and content available in North America for free-to-air use.

== Funding ==
Although commonly described as free, the cost of free-to-air services is met through various means:

- Tax funding
- Enforced levy of a licence fee for transmission and production costs (e.g., the BBC)
- Voluntary donation for local transmission and production costs (e.g., PBS)
- Commercial advertising for transmission and production costs and surplus revenues returned to the government (e.g., CBC Television/Ici Radio-Canada Télé in Canada, SBS in Australia and TVNZ in New Zealand)
- Commercial sponsorship
- Consumer products and services where part of the cost goes toward television advertising and sponsorship (in the case of Japanese television broadcasters like TV Asahi and TV Tokyo which rely heavily on sponsorship, similar to Philippine broadcasters like ABS-CBN, TV5 and GMA)

== Middle East ==
=== Israel ===
Up until 2012, Israel had several free-to-air channels. The major ones rating-wise were Channel 2, Channel 10, and Channel 1. The other ones were Educational, Channel 33, and Knesset 99. Since 2018, Israel has several new free-to-air channels that replace their older counterparts. The major ones rating-wise: are Channel 12, Channel 13, Kan 11, and Channel 20. The others are Kan Educational, Makan 33, and Knesset Channel.

== Africa ==
=== South Africa ===
In 1971, the SABC was finally allowed to introduce a television service. Initially, the proposal was for two television channels, one in English and Afrikaans, aimed at white audiences, and another, known as TV Bantu, aimed at black viewers. However, when television was finally introduced, there was only one channel with airtime divided evenly between English and Afrikaans, alternating between the two languages. Test transmissions in Johannesburg began on 5 May 1975, followed in July by ones in Cape Town and Durban. Nationwide services finally commenced on 5 January 1976.

In common with most of Western Europe, South Africa used the PAL system for colour television, being only the second terrestrial television service in sub-Saharan Africa to launch with a colour-only service, Zanzibar in Tanzania having introduced the first such service in 1973. (Tanzania itself did not establish a television service until the early 1990s, similarly concerned about the expense and perceived threat to cultural norms.) The Government, advised by SABC technicians, took the view that colour television would have to be available so as to avoid a costly migration from black-and-white broadcasting technology.

Initially, the TV service was funded entirely through a licence fee as in the UK, charged at R36. However, advertising began on 1 January 1978. On 1 January 1982, two services were introduced, TV2 broadcasting in Zulu and Xhosa and TV3 broadcasting in Sotho and Tswana, aimed at a black urban audience. In 1985, a new service called TV4 was introduced, carrying sports and entertainment programming, using the channel shared by TV2 and TV3, which ended transmissions at 9:30 pm. In 1992, TV2, TV3 and TV4 were combined into a new service called CCV (Contemporary Community Values). A third channel was introduced known as TSS, or Topsport Surplus, Topsport being the brand name for the SABC's sport coverage, but this was replaced by NNTV (National Network TV), an educational, non-commercial channel, in 1994.

The main channel, now called TV1, was divided evenly between English and Afrikaans, as before. It also became available in Walvis Bay, an enclave of South Africa in Namibia, which was itself then under South African administration, with a live feed of the channel broadcast via Intelsat being retransmitted on a local low-power repeater. In 1986, the SABC's monopoly was challenged by the launch of a subscription-based service known as M-Net, backed by a consortium of newspaper publishers on 1 October. However, as part of its licensing restrictions, it could not broadcast news programmes, which were still the preserve of the SABC, although M-Net started broadcasting a current affairs programme called Carte Blanche in 1988. As the state-controlled broadcaster, the SABC was accused of bias towards the apartheid regime, giving only limited coverage to opposition politicians.

== Asia ==
=== Hong Kong ===
In Hong Kong, the largest and most dominant television channel, Television Broadcasts Limited, was the first free-to-air commercial television channel when it commenced broadcasting on 19 November 1967. It may also well be among the oldest and first stations to broadcast over-the-air in East and Southeast Asia. ViuTV and RTHK TV started broadcasting in 2016. Phoenix Hong Kong Channel TV Started Broadcasting in 22 April 2024.

=== India ===
Around 600 FTA television channels and 180 radio channels are broadcast from ku-band and c-band transponders on the INSAT-4B and GSAT-15 satellite covering India, Pakistan, Bangladesh, Bhutan, Nepal, Sri Lanka and parts of Afghanistan, and Myanmar. In India, the channels are marketed as DD Direct Plus/DD Free Dish by Doordarshan, India's national broadcaster and other Indian private broadcaster ABS Free Dish from the ABS2 satellite. One can receive free-to-air regional TV channels using a small DTH antenna and a free-to-air set-top box.

=== South Korea ===
In Korea, KBS, MBC (the two main public broadcasters), SBS (privately owned, but available for free to viewers), and EBS (including both TV and radio) are the free-to-air broadcasting stations. They dominate more than 80% of advertisement profits, according to the recent survey from the agency. Due to the recent government's decision, digital television service for all free-to-air networks would be scheduled before 2012, followed by the end of analog television broadcasting.

== Europe ==
=== Satellite ===
European countries have a tradition of most television services being free-to-air. Germany, in particular, receives in excess of 100 digital satellite TV channels free-to-air. Approximately half of the television channels on SES Astra's 19.2° east and 28.2° east satellite positions, and Eutelsat's Hot Bird (13° east) are free-to-air. A number of European channels which one might expect to be broadcast free-to-air - including many countries' national terrestrial broadcasters - do not do so via satellite for copyright reasons. Rights to purchase programs for free-to-air broadcast, especially via satellite, are often higher in price than for encrypted broadcast.

The lack of FTA among public broadcasters are prevalent in countries whose broadcasters tend to use subtitles for foreign language programmes; although Spain's two public domestic channels, La Uno and La Dos, are also encrypted despite dubbed foreign programmes being the norm in Spain. However, these channels usually provide a scheme to offer free, but encrypted, viewing with free-to-view broadcasts. Certain programming on Italy's RAI, and the majority of Dutch channels are covered by such schemes (although in the case of RAI some programming is transmitted without encryption where there are no copyright issues). In Austria, the main national networks broadcast free-to-view via satellite; however, all regional and some smaller channels are transmitted free-to-air, and the national public broadcaster, ORF, offers a special free-to-air channel which airs selected programming without (i.e. those without copyright issues) via satellite all over Europe.

As Germany and Austria speak the same language and use the same satellite, Austrian viewers are able to receive about 120 free German-speaking channels from both countries. In general, all satellite radio in Europe is free-to-air, but the more conventional broadcast systems in use mean that SiriusXM style in-car reception is not possible. Cable and satellite distribution allow many more channels to carry sports, movies and specialist channels which are not broadcast as FTA. The viewing figures for these channels are generally much lower than the FTA channels.

=== Terrestrial ===
Various European countries broadcast a large number of channels via free-to-air terrestrial, generally as an analog PAL/SECAM transmission, digital DVB-T/T2 or a combination of the two.

==== Croatia ====
In Croatia eleven national channels are free-to-air: HRT 1, HRT 2, HRT 3, HRT 4 (HRT being national broadcaster), Nova TV, Doma TV, RTL, RTL2, RTL Kockica, CMC and SPTV. There are around 21 local or regional channels. Before June 2020, they used to be transmitted via three OiV (state-owned public broadcasting company) DVB-T and one DVB-T2 (HEVC/H.265) MUXes. As of June 2020, the DVB-T MUXes were switched off and all eleven national channels are now distributed via two OiV DVB-T2 (HEVC/H.265) MUXes.

==== Denmark ====
In Denmark, six channels are as of 2020 free-to-air, distributed via 18 main transmitter sites and 30 smaller, auxiliary transmitters. The six channels (DR1, DR2, DR Ramasjang, Folketinget, TV2 Regionerne, and sign language/local programme) come in one DVB-T2 multiplex.

==== France ====
In France, there are 26 national television channels (MPEG-4 HD video) and 41 local television channels broadcast free-to-air via the TNT DVB-T2 service.

==== Germany ====
In Germany there are various free-to-air DVB-T services available, the number of which varies by region. Das Erste, ZDF, ZDFneo, ZDFinfo, 3sat, Arte, KiKA and Phoenix are available throughout the country, in addition to at least one region-dependent channel which is provided by the regional ARD member. Additionally, ARD's EinsFestival, EinsPlus and tagesschau24 are variously available in some parts of the country, and various commercial channels are available in metropolitan areas.

==== Ireland ====
In the Republic of Ireland, there are nine television channels and 11 radio channels broadcast free-to-air via the DVB-T Saorview service. Analog PAL versions of some of the channels were also broadcast until October 24, 2012, when all analogue television broadcasting was shut down.

==== Malta ====
All of Malta's national and political party channels are available free-to-air. The national channels TVM and TVM2, Parliament TV and the political party channels NET and ONE, all are broadcast via the free-to-air DVB-T service. Even HD versions of these channels are available free-to-air. The only scrambled channel in Malta is ITV Teleshopping.

==== Netherlands ====
In the Netherlands, three national public television channels (NPO 1, NPO 2 and NPO 3) and seven national public radio channels broadcast free-to-air via the DVB-T Digitenne service. The television and radio channels of the regional public broadcasters are also free-to-air via the DVB-T service.

==== Portugal ====
In Portugal, there are about 4 national public television channels (RTP1, RTP2, RTP3, RTP Memória) and Rádio e Televisão de Portugal channel and 2 other independent channel (SIC, TVI) and 2 regional stations, (RTP Açores, RTP Madeira) and 2 channel abroad (RTP Internacional, RTP África) free-to-air DVB-T is TDT channel of Portugal.(Digital terrestrial television in Portugal).

==== Spain ====
In Spain, there are around 25 national and 40 regional channels, as well as many local channels and radio stations. All television channels are in HD, with at least one UHD channel (La 1). The state broadcaster, Televisión Española, is publicly funded and does not show commercials. The two major competing networks, Atresmedia and Mediaset, are privately owned and show commercials. All broadcasts are free-to-air, and there is no concept of paying for a TV license. The acronym used for DVB-T in Spain is TDT (Digital terrestrial television in Spain).

==== United Kingdom ====
In the UK, the five main free-to-air television networks are BBC One, BBC Two, ITV, Channel 4 and 5. Around 108 free-to-air television channels and 30 free-to-air radio channels are available terrestrially via the Freeview DVB-T service. Seven HD channels are also broadcast via a public service broadcast multiplex and a commercial multiplex, both DVB-T2. The informal term "council telly" is sometimes used for free-to-air television in the UK, evoking a basic service accessible to all.

== North America ==
There are a number of competing systems in use. Early adopters used C-band dishes several feet in diameter to receive analog microwave broadcasts, and later digital microwave broadcasts using the 3.7-4.2 GHz band. Today, although large C-band dishes can still receive some content, the 11.7-12.2 GHz K_{u} band is also used. Ku-band signals can be received using smaller diameter dishes, often as small as one meter (3 ft 3 in), allowing FTA satellite to be picked up from smaller spaces such as apartment balconies (note, however, that these dishes are not quite as small as those commonly used for commercial services such as Dish Network, DirecTV, Bell ExpressVu, Shaw Direct, etc. Dishes intended for those services may not deliver an adequate signal on Ku-band). The European-developed DVB-S and DVB-S2 standards are the most commonly used broadcast methods, with analog transmissions almost completely discontinued as of mid-2014. The most common North American sources for free-to-air DVB satellite television are:

- NHK World HD on Intelsat 9 (58°W)
- Retro TV, Heartland on AMC 9 (83°W)
- LPB Louisiana PBS channels LPBHD, LPB2, and LPB3 (Create) on SES 2 (89°W)
- NASA TV Multi-channel (NASA TV Public-Education, NASA Media, NASA TV UHD) on Horizons-1 (aka Galaxy 13) (127°W)
- Eternal Word Television Network on Galaxy 17 (91°W)
- My Family TV, CGTN on Galaxy 3C (95°W).
- AMGTV and BYU Television (BYUtv) on Galaxy 19 (97°W)
- English and foreign language broadcasters RT (TV network), Ebru TV, IRINN, Al Jazeera English and more up-linked by GlobeCast World TV on Galaxy 19 (97°W)
- Christian broadcasters such as The Word Network, Emmanuel TV, Daystar Television Network, JCTV, Trinity Broadcasting Network, The Church Channel, 3ABN, The Hope Channel, Amazing Facts Television, and God's Learning Channel are broadcast from the Galaxy 19 (97°W) satellite for Glorystar and Spiritcast Satellite Systems TV.
- Peace TV English and Peace TV Urdu language which are global Islamic channels, available on Galaxy 19 (97°W)
- DoD News on AMC 1 (103°W)
- Jewish Life Television on Galaxy 18 (123°W)
- Montana Public Broadcasting Service and other PBS Satellite Services on AMC 21 (125°W)
- Classic Arts Showcase on Galaxy 17 (91°W) and Eternal Word Television Network HD on Galaxy 15 (133°W)
- Football, basketball, baseball, soccer, and ice hockey wildfeeds on various satellites
- InfoWars and The Alex Jones Show broadcast from Austin, Texas, and creates free-to-air 24/7 content on Galaxy 16 99°W.

Most of these signals are carried by US satellites. There is little or no free Canadian DVB-S content available to users of medium-size dishes, as much of the available Ku-band satellite bandwidth is occupied by pay-TV operators Shaw Direct and Bell Satellite TV, although larger C-band dishes can pick up some content. FTA signals may be scattered across multiple satellites, requiring a motor or multiple LNBs to receive everything. This differs from Europe, where FTA signals are commonly concentrated on a few specific satellites. Another difference between North American FTA and FTA in most of the rest of the world is that in North America, very few of the available signals are actually intended for home viewers or other end-users. Instead, they are generally intended for reception by local television stations, cable system headends, or other commercial users. While it is generally thought to be legal for home viewers to view such transmissions as long as they are not encrypted, this means that there are several unique challenges to viewing FTA signals, challenges not present in other areas of the world. Among these are:

- No schedule information is provided with most of the signals; therefore, satellite receivers cannot show a proper electronic program guide (EPG).
- Because many of these broadcasts are essentially point-to-point transmissions, the originators often do not follow any international standards when setting various identification fields in the data stream. This causes issues with receivers and software designed for use in other parts of the world, as they may assume that if a channel contains the same ID information as another channel, those are duplicate channels. This may be a valid assumption in other parts of the world, but is almost never valid for North American FTA signals. When such an assumption is made, during a "blind scan" the receiver or software will often fail to correctly insert one or more channels into its database, or it may overwrite previously scanned valid channels (including other channels on the same satellite) with invalid information picked up from another, more recently scanned channel. If the end user does not understand what is happening, they may assume that the receiver cannot receive certain channels or that it is defective, yet if the correct data for those channels can be manually entered, those channels may become receivable. This problem can be mitigated if receivers can be set to ignore channels that appear to be duplicates during a "blind scan", except when such channels are on exactly the same satellite and same transponder frequency (as might occur if the user rescans a previously scanned satellite).
- Channels tend to come and go, or change transmission formats, often without any prior notice other than to their intended recipients. This means that a working channel could suddenly disappear without warning, and may need to be rescanned to become receivable again, or it may be gone permanently.
- Channels that are currently FTA can become scrambled (encrypted) with no advance warning. A few channels tend to go back and forth between being "in the clear" (unscrambled) to scrambled at various times, but in most cases, once a channel is scrambled it stays scrambled.
- Historically, it has appeared that broadcasters are more likely to scramble their signals when they become aware that home viewers and other "unauthorized" viewers are watching their signals. Therefore, those who know what signals are available may sometimes be reluctant to share that information in open forums. While sites exist that attempt to list currently viewable FTA signals, most of them are incomplete or do not contain current information. Such sites typically rely on reports of changes by viewers, and if viewers are reluctant to report new FTA signals for fear they might disappear, it becomes more of a challenge for such sites to maintain up-to-date listings.
- What some would consider the most desirable signals, e.g. feeds from broadcast networks, are primarily only available on C-band, which requires a large dish (usually at least 6 feet or 1.8 meters in diameter or more, although a few hobbyists have found it possible to receive some C-band signals using smaller dishes and high quality LNBs). Also some of those signals utilize high-bitrate formats that cannot be received by many older receivers, even if those receivers are capable of receiving digital signals, and such signals may require a larger than usual dish for adequate reception. In many areas, local zoning laws and/or homeowner associations forbid the placement of a large dish, therefore such dishes have fallen out of favor since commercial satellite services became widely available. Therefore, very few people have the capability to receive the C-band broadcasts. Another issue is that properly aiming a C-band dish is not something that a typical end-user would know how to do, since it tends to be a somewhat complex procedure (especially when a moveable dish is used with the intention of tracking the visible satellite arc in order to receive multiple satellites), and many of the installers that knew how to set up and correctly aim a C-band dish have exited the business.
- While equipment and software is becoming available that allows home users to set up a backend system that can deliver received over-the-air ATSC signals to several frontend systems (for example, a HDHomeRun, VBox Home TV Gateway or similar TV tuner, used with MythTV or TVHeadEnd), a similar system for receiving FTA signals is considerably more difficult to set up. While PCI/PCIe tuner cards and USB tuners for DVB-S and DVB-S2 are available, there are often issues with drivers, or the cards may simply not be compatible with the backend software in use. Therefore, setting up such a system for FTA satellite reception tends to require considerably more technical knowledge, and a willingness to work through issues, than setting up such a system for receiving terrestrial signals.
- Some syndicated programming is being sent as data, similar to the way a video file might be sent over the Internet. This means that the programming is not sent in a format that can be viewed in real time, as it is being received. Instead, the data must be captured to a storage device and decoded for later use. Traditional satellite receivers and even many PC tuner cards are not capable of receiving these signals, and even if you have a card capable of receiving such signals, you also need special software to find such data streams and when one is found, to extract the data stream and save it.

The largest groups of end-users for Ku-band free-to-air signals were initially the ethnic-language communities, as often free ethnic-language programming would be sponsored by Multilingual American Communities and their broadcasters. Depending on language and origin of the individual signals, North American ethnic-language TV is a mix of pay-TV, free-to-air and DBS operations. Today, many American broadcasters send a multitude of programming channels in many languages, spanning many new channels, so they can get National support, which ultimately leads to carriage by cable systems, to additionally support the high costs of broadcasting signals in this way. Nevertheless, free-to-air satellite TV is a viable addition to home video systems, not only for the reception of specialized content but also for use in locations where terrestrial ATSC over-the-air reception is incomplete and additional channels are desired.

== Oceania ==
=== Australia ===
Australia has five major free-to-air networks: the two public broadcasting networks – ABC and SBS, and three commercial networks – Seven Network, Nine Network, and Network 10. Traditionally each network had only a single channel in a geographic area, but with the advent of digital television each network started broadcasting several SD multichannels, such as 7two, 9Gem, 10 Drama, and SBS Food, as well as at least one HD channel. There are also free-to-air community television channels in some major cities. Viewers in remote parts of Australia are able to access many Australian free-to-air channels using the DVB-S2 Optus VAST service.

=== New Zealand ===
New Zealand has a number of FTA broadcasters such as Television New Zealand's TVNZ 1 and TVNZ 2, as well as Discovery New Zealand's Three and Bravo, Sky Network Television's Sky Open and the government subsidised the Whakaata Māori and Te Reo channels. Four channels, TVNZ 1, TVNZ 2, Three, Bravo are also broadcast timeshifted by +1 hour on Freeview and Sky platforms. A broadcast of parliament and a number of local channels were available but since have closed, such as Cue TV were also available. Local stations such as CTV and Face TV (previously Triangle TV) were free-to-air analogue PAL transmissions prior to CTV migrating to the free-to-air digital DVB-T service and Face TV's terrestrial free-to-air service shutoff from December 2013. A digital terrestrial version of Freeview was launched in 2008, which, unlike the analogue and free-to-air satellite options, supports high-definition broadcasts for TVNZ 1, TVNZ 2, Three and Bravo. While, airing the timeshifted channels also.

== South America ==
=== Brazil ===
In Brazil the main FTA satellite is the Star One D2, it holds approximately C-band analog channels (1985-2024), including all major networks like TV Globo (feed SP1 digital HDTV), SBT (feed nacional digital HDTV), Record (feed SP digital HDTV), Record News (feed nacional digital HDTV), RFTV (feed nacional digital HDTV), RedeTV! (feed nacional digital HDTV), Band (feed nacional digital HDTV), Cultura, Futura (feed nacional digital HDTV), TV Verdes Mares (feed nacional digital HDTV), Canal Gov, Canal Libras and others, 36 C-band and KU-band digital HDTV channels.

=== Chile ===
In Chile the main FTA satellite is the Hispasat 74W-1, it holds approximately 10 KU-band digital HDTV channels including all major networks like La Red, Telecanal, TVN Regional, TVN2 Regional, Canal 24HRS, CHV, CHV2, CDTV, TV Senado, La Red Feed, Telecanal Feed and TVN Feed.

== See also ==
- FTA receiver, equipment for receiving free-to-air broadcasts
- Free-to-view
- Murphy v Media Protection Services Limited
- Pay television
- Satellite dish
- Satellite television
- Set-top box
