= Digital terrestrial television in Portugal =

Digital terrestrial television in Portugal (Portuguese: Televisão Digital Terrestre, or TDT) launched on 29 April 2009 with (as of December 2016) 7 free-to-air (FTA) channels. In the Azores and Madeira Islands, regional channels (RTP Açores or RTP Madeira) are available. By June 2010 TDT coverage reached 83% of the population and was expected to reach 100% by the end of 2010. The analog to digital conversion finished on 26 April 2012. The four existing analog FTA channels simulcasted in DVB-T, MPEG-4/H.264 (digital), and PAL (analog).

== History ==
The Portuguese government first began considering digital terrestrial television in 1998, at a time when the first services in Europe were being tested. The tentative launch of the platform was set to be in 2000; the first phase was supposed to end in 2002.

On April 2, 2001, Ferro Rodrigues announced the first tender for a digital terrestrial television network in Portugal, with a second tender to grant the channels in the second half of the year. The goal was to start in the second half of 2002, achieving a 90% reach, and shutting down the analog signals in 2007. On August 20, the PTDP consortium won the license.

PTDP's service was scheduled to start on August 31, 2002, but due to recommendations from ANACOM, it was suggested that the launch was to be delayed to 2003. After the delay, ANACOM suggested the dismantling of the PTDP consortium.

In April 2008, there were two companies bidding for the exploitation of subscription channels on digital terrestrial, PT using MEO and the Swedish company AirPlus TV. Following the commercial launch of MEO's IPTV service, there were plans for a MEO DT service, which was set to be the cheapest subscription television offer in the market.

The TDT process was broken into two licenses: one for management of the FTA network and frequencies, and one for the management and distribution of pay TV channels and content. Both licenses were won by Portugal Telecom (PT). PT also acquired the transmitter network of Televisão Independente (TVI), thus becoming the sole broadcaster of analog television signals. ANACOM's objective was to have 5 TDT FTA channels (including a new 5th FTA channel) and a paid TV offer of around 40 channels. The plan for a paid TV offer was abandoned when PT announced that they were returning the paid TV license to ANACOM, which returned the €2.5 million paid by PT.

The creation of the fifth TV channel was criticized by private broadcasters, TVI and Sociedade Independente de Comunicação (SIC). They argued that the television advertising market was saturated and a new broadcaster would damage existing channels.

ARTV started test broadcasts on December 27, 2012 and regular broadcasts on January 3, 2013. The channel became the first terrestrial channel to launch in nearly twenty years.

In June 2016, the government allowed four new television channels: two existing RTP channels (RTP3 and RTP Memória) under the condition that these wouldn't carry commercial advertising on terrestrial, while two private channels were open to a bidding round from the private sector.

In 2023, Media Capital CEO Pedro Morais Leitão said that the company was considering pulling out of DTT broadcasting. In November 2023, ANACOM extended the DTT license by 7 years upon MEO request. This license will be valid until 10 December 2030.

As of 2024, RTP pays €8 million for the national carriage of four of its channels on the platform, at a cost of €2 million per channel.

== Transmitters ==
There are in total 262 DTT transmitters available in Portugal.

DTT transmitters	Channel	Frequencies
Abrantes	35	582-590 MHz
Águeda	44	654-662 MHz
Águeda Industrial	44	654-662 MHz
Albufeira	43	646-654 MHz
Alcácer do Sal	37	598-606 MHz
Alcobaça	35	582-590 MHz
Alcoutim	47	678-686 MHz
Aldeia de Juso	35	582-590 MHz
Alenquer	35	582-590 MHz
Algueirão	35	582-590 MHz
Almada	37	598-606 MHz
Almodôvar	43	646-654 MHz
Alter do Chão	43	646-654 MHz
Alto de São Bento, Évora	30	542-550 MHz
Alto do Galeão	33	566-574 MHz
Alvaiázere	44	654-662 MHz
Alverca	35	582-590 MHz
Alvite, Moimenta da Beira	42	638-646 MHz
Alvôco das Várzeas	44	654-662 MHz
Amarante	36	590-598 MHz
Arcos de Valdevez	33	566-574 MHz
Arganil	44	654-662 MHz
Arouca	36	590-598 MHz
Arronches	43	646-654 MHz
Arruda dos Vinhos	35	582-590 MHz
Aveiro Centro	36	590-598 MHz
Avessadas	36	590-598 MHz
Avis	43	646-654 MHz
Azoia - Sintra	35	582-590 MHz
Baião	36	590-598 MHz
Barcarena	35	582-590 MHz
Barrancos	30	542-550 MHz
Barroca Grande	44	654-662 MHz
Barrosa	48	686-694 MHz
Batalha	35	582-590 MHz
Beja	30	542-550 MHz
Benfica, Lisboa	35	582-590 MHz
Bezerra	35	582-590 MHz
Boa Viagem	46	670-678 MHz
Boa Viagem 2	44	654-662 MHz
Bonfim	36	590-598 MHz
Borba	30	542-550 MHz
Bornes	46	670-678 MHz
Braga - Santa Marta	33	566-574 MHz
Braga Centro	33	566-574 MHz
Bragança	46	670-678 MHz
Bragança - São Bartolomeu	46	670-678 MHz
Bufão	43	646-654 MHz
Cabaços, Moimenta da Beira	48	686-694 MHz
Cacém	35	582-590 MHz
Caldas da Rainha	35	582-590 MHz
Caldas de Vizela	36	590-598 MHz
Camarinhas	47	678-686 MHz
Campo Maior	43	646-654 MHz
Candeeiros	35	582-590 MHz
Caparica	37	598-606 MHz
Caramulo	44	654-662 MHz
Carpinteira - Covilhã	34	574-582 MHz
Cascais	35	582-590 MHz
Castanheira de Pêra	44	654-662 MHz
Castelete - Pico	46	670-678 MHz
Castelo de Paiva	42	638-646 MHz
Castelo de Vide	43	646-654 MHz
Castro Verde	43	646-654 MHz
Ceira	44	654-662 MHz
Celorico de Basto	36	590-598 MHz
Cerdeira	33	566-574 MHz
Cerro da Águia	43	646-654 MHz
Cheleiros	35	582-590 MHz
Coimbra Centro	44	654-662 MHz
Coimbra Observatório	44	654-662 MHz
Coruche	35	582-590 MHz
Couço	35	582-590 MHz
Covas	33	566-574 MHz
Cruz de Pau	37	598-606 MHz
Elvas	43	646-654 MHz
Encumeada	47	678-686 MHz
Espalamaca - Faial	47	678-686 MHz
Espinhal	44	654-662 MHz
Estoril	35	582-590 MHz
Estremoz	43	646-654 MHz
Estremoz - Quinta da Esperança	43	646-654 MHz
Évora - Entrevinhas	30	542-550 MHz
Évora Centro	30	542-550 MHz
Faro	47	678-686 MHz
Fátima	35	582-590 MHz
Ferreira do Alentejo	30	542-550 MHz
Fóia 1	43	646-654 MHz
Fóia 2	28	526-534 MHz
Fornos de Algodres	41	630-638 MHz
Foz	36	590-598 MHz
Funchal, Madeira	47	678-686 MHz
Gaia	36	590-598 MHz
Gaia Centro	36	590-598 MHz
Gardunha	34	574-582 MHz
Gavião	43	646-654 MHz
Gerês	33	566-574 MHz
Graça	35	582-590 MHz
Grândola	37	598-606 MHz
Guarda	41	630-638 MHz
Guimarães Centro	33	566-574 MHz
Guimarães Penha	33	566-574 MHz
Janas	35	582-590 MHz
Junqueira	36	590-598 MHz
Lagos Centro	43	646-654 MHz
Lagos Norte	43	646-654 MHz
Lamego	36	590-598 MHz
Leça	36	590-598 MHz
Leiranco	33	566-574 MHz
Leiria	44	654-662 MHz
Lisboa - Castelo	35	582-590 MHz
Lisboa - Estrela	35	582-590 MHz
Lisboa - Restelo	35	582-590 MHz
Lisboa - Trindade	35	582-590 MHz
Lisboa - Xabregas	35	582-590 MHz
Logo de Deus - Coimbra	44	654-662 MHz
Loulé	47	678-686 MHz
Lourosa	36	590-598 MHz
Lousã	46	670-678 MHz
Lousa - Torre de Moncorvo	46	670-678 MHz
Mação	43	646-654 MHz
Machialinho	44	654-662 MHz
Malveira	35	582-590 MHz
Mangualde	36	590-598 MHz
Manteigas	41	630-638 MHz
Marofa	48	686-694 MHz
Marvão	43	646-654 MHz
Mealhada	44	654-662 MHz
Melides	37	598-606 MHz
Mendro	40	622-630 MHz
Mértola	47	678-686 MHz
Mira de Aire	35	582-590 MHz
Mirandela	46	670-678 MHz
Mogadouro	46	670-678 MHz
Moledo	33	566-574 MHz
Monchique	43	646-654 MHz
Monsanto, Lisboa	35	582-590 MHz
Montalegre	33	566-574 MHz
Monte da Virgem, Porto	42	638-646 MHz
Monte do Facho	44	654-662 MHz
Monte Franqueira, Barcelos	36	590-598 MHz
Monte Gois	33	566-574 MHz
Montedor	33	566-574 MHz
Montejunto	48	686-694 MHz
Montemor-o-Novo	30	542-550 MHz
Mora	30	542-550 MHz
Mortágua	44	654-662 MHz
Mosteiro	41	630-638 MHz
Moura	30	542-550 MHz
Nazaré Centro	35	582-590 MHz
Nisa	43	646-654 MHz
Óbidos	35	582-590 MHz
Odemira	43	646-654 MHz
Odivelas	35	582-590 MHz
Odivelas Centro	35	582-590 MHz
Oleiros	34	574-582 MHz
Olivais	35	582-590 MHz
Ourém	35	582-590 MHz
Ourique	43	646-654 MHz
Padrela	46	670-678 MHz
Palmeira de Faro	36	590-598 MHz
Palmela	45	662-670 MHz
Palmela	37	598-606 MHz
Pampilhosa da Serra	44	654-662 MHz
Paredes de Coura	33	566-574 MHz
Pedra do Vento	41	630-638 MHz
Pedra Mole	47	678-686 MHz
Penacova	44	654-662 MHz
Penafiel	36	590-598 MHz
Penamacor	34	574-582 MHz
Penedo da Saudade, Coimbra	44	654-662 MHz
Penedo Gordo	43	646-654 MHz
Peniche	35	582-590 MHz
Penouta	33	566-574 MHz
Pico Alto, Açores	46	670-678 MHz
Pico Arco da Calheta - Madeira	47	678-686 MHz
Pico Arco de São Jorge - Madeira	47	678-686 MHz
Pico Bartolomeu	44	654-662 MHz
Pico da Cruz - Madeira	47	678-686 MHz
Pico do Facho - Madeira	47	678-686 MHz
Pico do Galo, Madeira	47	678-686 MHz
Pico do Silva (Madeira)	47	678-686 MHz
Pico Geraldo, Pico	48	686-694 MHz
Pico Jardim - Açores	46	670-678 MHz
Pico Verde	48	686-694 MHz
Picota	47	678-686 MHz
Piódão	44	654-662 MHz
Pirocão	46	670-678 MHz
Podame	33	566-574 MHz
Pombal	44	654-662 MHz
Ponta Delgada, Madeira	47	678-686 MHz
Ponte de Lima	33	566-574 MHz
Portalegre	43	646-654 MHz
Porto - Av. Brasil	36	590-598 MHz
Porto - Fernão Lopes	36	590-598 MHz
Porto - Pedro Escobar	36	590-598 MHz
Porto de Mós	35	582-590 MHz
Porto Santo (Madeira)	46	670-678 MHz
Póvoa de Lanhoso	33	566-574 MHz
Póvoa Santo Adrião	35	582-590 MHz
Redondo	30	542-550 MHz
Reguengos de Monsaraz	30	542-550 MHz
Reitoria - Covilhã	34	574-582 MHz
Resende	36	590-598 MHz
Ribeira de Pena	33	566-574 MHz
Ribeira Grande	44	654-662 MHz
Rio Arda	36	590-598 MHz
Rio Maior	35	582-590 MHz
Santa Bárbara (Açores)	45	662-670 MHz
Santa Luzia	47	678-686 MHz
Santa Marta de Penaguião	36	590-598 MHz
Santarém	35	582-590 MHz
Santiago do Cacém	37	598-606 MHz
Santo Tirso	36	590-598 MHz
São Bernardo	36	590-598 MHz
São Domingos	36	590-598 MHz
São João de Ver, Santa Maria da Feira	42	638-646 MHz
São Mamede	47	678-686 MHz
São Miguel, Faro	47	678-686 MHz
Sapiãos, Boticas	33	566-574 MHz
Sátão	36	590-598 MHz
Seixo Alvo	36	590-598 MHz
Serpa	30	542-550 MHz
Serra do Alvão	36	590-598 MHz
Serra do Cume	46	670-678 MHz
Sertã	44	654-662 MHz
Sesimbra	37	598-606 MHz
Silves	43	646-654 MHz
Silves Centro	43	646-654 MHz
Sines	43	646-654 MHz
Sintra	35	582-590 MHz
Sítio da Nazaré	35	582-590 MHz
Sousel	43	646-654 MHz
Surrinha	41	630-638 MHz
Tavira	47	678-686 MHz
Termas Monfortinho	34	574-582 MHz
Terras de Bouro	33	566-574 MHz
Tocha	44	654-662 MHz
Tomar	35	582-590 MHz
Torres Vedras	35	582-590 MHz
Trancão - Torres Novas	35	582-590 MHz
Trancoso	41	630-638 MHz
Vale de Cambra	36	590-598 MHz
Vale de Mira	46	670-678 MHz
Valença	33	566-574 MHz
Valongo	36	590-598 MHz
Velas	44	654-662 MHz
Viana do Castelo	33	566-574 MHz
Vieira do Minho	33	566-574 MHz
Vila da Ponte, Sernancelhe	48	686-694 MHz
Vila de Rei	44	654-662 MHz
Vila Franca de Xira	35	582-590 MHz
Vila Franca de Xira - Montegordo	35	582-590 MHz
Vila Nova de São Bento	30	542-550 MHz
Vila Praia de Âncora	33	566-574 MHz
Vila Viçosa	30	542-550 MHz
Vilar Formoso	41	630-638 MHz
Vinhais	46	670-678 MHz
Viseu Centro	36	590-598 MHz
Viseu Sul	36	590-598 MHz
Volta da Pedra, Palmela	37	598-606 MHz
Vouzela	36	590-598 MHz

== Channels ==
LCN	Channel	Resolution	Owner
1	RTP1	SD (720x576i)	RTP
2	RTP2	SD (720x576i)	RTP
3	SIC	SD (720x576i)	Impresa
4	TVI	SD (720x576i)	Media Capital
5	ARtv	SD (720x576i)	Assembly of the Republic
6	RTP Notícias	SD (720x576i)	RTP
7	RTP Memória	SD (720x576i)	RTP
