= RTP Notícias =

Portuguese television news channel

- Current logo since 2026
- Country: Portugal
- Broadcast area: Portugal; Angola; Mozambique; Cape Verde
- Headquarters: Lisbon (main); Porto (secondary)

Programming
- Picture format: 1080i HDTV (downscaled to 576i for the SD feed)

Ownership
- Owner: Rádio e Televisão de Portugal
- Sister channels: RTP1; RTP2; RTP Desporto; RTP Memória; RTP Açores; RTP Madeira; RTP África; RTP Mundo; RTP Zig Zag

History
- Launched: 15 October 2001; 24 years ago
- Former names: NTV (15 October 2001 – 31 May 2004); RTPN (31 May 2004 – 19 September 2011, current); RTP Informação (19 September 2011 – 5 October 2015); RTP3 (5 October 2015 – 12 October 2025)

Links
- Website: www.rtp.pt/rtpnoticias/

Availability

Terrestrial
- TDT (Portugal): Channel 6
- Cabo Verde Broadcast (Cape Verde): Channel 6 (international feed)

Streaming media
- RTP Play: http://www.rtp.pt/play/direto/rtpnoticias

RTP Notícias is a Portuguese free-to-air television channel owned and operated by state-owned public broadcaster Rádio e Televisão de Portugal (RTP). It is the company's all-news television channel, and is known for its 24-hour rolling news service and its live coverage of breaking news.

It was launched on 15 October 2001. Since then, it has been renamed several times, from NTV, RTPN, RTP Informação, RTP3 until to its currently known name, RTP Notícias. It is available on basic cable, satellite and, since 2016, terrestrial television.

Unlike the other national RTP channels, the continuity and playout of the channel is handled at the Monte da Virgem studios, near Porto.

== History ==
=== NTV (under Porto TV) ===
The company Porto TV - Informação e Multimédia, S.A. was registered on 6 August 1999 and would, thanks to a protocol signed between PT Multimédia and the municipality of Porto signed on the same day, provide a cable channel for TV Cabo with news catering to the Porto area. PT's president Graça Bau said that the channel was going to use cutting-edge technology for its broadcasts and deliver its signals on cable, satellite and the internet. Porto had plans for a local television station since at least 1992. Its launch was initially scheduled for early 2000. The channel would use the RTP Porto facilities at Monte da Virgem, Gaia, for its technical know-how and playout.

In August 2001, the channel's launch was announced with its facilities located in a former RTP maintenance area in Porto, which was renovated in June to house presenting tests.

The channel was launched on 15 October 2001 as NTV, a cable news channel headquartered in Porto. It was originally a joint-venture between PT Multimédia, Lusomundo and the television broadcaster Radiotelevisão Portuguesa (the old RTP). One month after launching, on 15 November 2001, it broadcast its first outside live broadcast from Vila de Rei during the 7pm bulletin, marking the beginning of its regular 24-hour broadcasts.

The initial primetime line-up consisted of:

- N Mundo, main news bulletin (9-9:30pm)
- Sports bulletin (8:35-9pm)
- N de Economia (9:45-10pm with repeat at 12:45-1am)
- Avenida dos Aliados (debate, 10:10-12am)

On 22 November, one week after the channel's launch, journalist Carlos Magno was ejected from his role as the director of its news unit. The early weeks of the channel were seen by a Público writer as a shame for Porto (and likely the north), as the channel's editorial statute was in a confused status, between local, national and European values. In its first week on air, Carlos Magno appeared for 22,5% of the weekly airtime.

=== NTV (under RTP) ===
On 9 August 2002 it was completely acquired by the old RTP (RTP held 25% up until then with PT Multimédia owning the remaining 75%), and announced a gradual restructuring of the channel's programming from September 2002. RTP also announced a plan to slash its internal budget One year after its launch, the channel was already starting to suffer in its ratings, falling in September to a 4,2% share from 5,9% in July. Financial difficulties led to a lack of new non-news programs. RTP announced in early 2003 that it would adopt the name RTP Regiões in order to cater all of the national territory. In March 2003, 25 of its journalists were withdrawn, as the channel was facing an uncertain future.

On 15 June 2003, RTP announced a new schedule for July, which would serve as a transitional schedule before October, initial target for the rebrand, which would envision a new name, which had not been disclosed yet. The new line-up was created to test the upcoming rebrand, which was going to be less aimed at Porto.

=== RTPN ===
With the merger between the old RTP and radio broadcaster Radiodifusão Portuguesa (RDP), forming the new RTP. The channel was initially going to be renamed by March 2004 (the rebrand took into effect on 31 March), but the name RTP Notícias was ruled out, under the grounds that the channel preferred not to compete with SIC Notícias. Initially scheduled for 31 March (the day of RTP's rebrand), it was later delayed to April, when it was expected to launch alongside RTP Memória. The channel selected wine red as its color. It became RTPN on 31 May 2004. In its first month alone, it had lost some of its audience in Porto. By January 2005, the channel had tripled its share. On 17 November 2005, it introduced a new schedule and new graphics.

RTPN debuted a 24-hour schedule on 29 September 2008. Up till then, RTPN simulcast Euronews during the early morning, until 10am. Since mid-2009, RTPN has been available outside Portugal, through cable TV providers in Angola and Mozambique. On 31 March 2011, its independent team was closed and merged with RTP's general news theme. RTP's news director Nuno Santos aimed at giging greater investments for the channel.

=== RTP Informação ===
In early September 2011, it was announced that the channel would be renamed RTP Informação later that month. The adoption of such a name, understood as one of the strategic pillars of RTP under Miguel Relvas, was to distance it from its perception with Porto and the north as a whole. The rebrand took place on 19 September 2011, beginning with a simulcast of Bom Dia Portugal which refreshed its graphics. The aim was to become the most watched news channel by year-end 2012.

=== RTP3 ===
On 22 July 2015 it was announced that RTP Informação would rebrand once again. On 15 September 2015, the date of rebrand was confirmed to be 5 October, RTP's director of programmes Daniel Deusdado told the media. At midnight between 4 and 5 October 2015 Portuguese time, the channel became RTP3, during the coverage of the legislative election 2015. The international feed (RTP3 Internacional) started broadcasting during 2016.

Since 1 December 2016, the channel is available on the Portuguese digital terrestrial television. The channel is also available as free-to-air channel in Cape Verde's digital terrestrial television network, which also includes RTP África.

On 19 September 2024, the channel announced the return of The Daily Show to Portuguese television, airing with subtitles Tuesdays to Fridays on a 24-hour delay from the American broadcast.

=== RTP Notícias ===
In September 2025, RTP said that the channel would change name and programming. That has been confirmed when in 8 October 2025, the RTP3 website had changed to RTP Notícias, aiming to "reaffirm its compromise with the news". The new news offer was presented to the public on 9 October. Ivity developed the new look, intros for programs were developed by Itsanashow Studio. The rebrand took place on 12 October 2025, the day of the 2025 Portuguese local elections, at 6:45pm.

== Logos ==
Logo as NTV, used from 15 October 2001 to 30 May 2004.

Logo as RTPN, used from 31 May 2004 to 18 September 2011.

Logo as RTP Informação, from 19 September 2011 to 4 October 2015.

Logo as RTP3, from 5 October 2015 to 12 October 2025.

First variant of the logo as RTP Notícias, used from 12 October 2025 to 29 March 2026.

Second variant of the logo as RTP Notícias, since 30 March 2026, with colours are tweaked to match RTP's blue colour.

== Programming ==
Despite being a news-based channel, in the past, RTP Notícias also aired some sports programming, such as the Olympics (2008 and 2012) and the now-defunct FIFA Confederations Cup (2013). During European Championships and World Cups, the channel airs primetime analysis of the event.

=== News programmes ===
- Bom Dia Portugal (6:00am-10am, simulcast with RTP1)
- Notícias 10
- Notícias 11
- Notícias 12
- Notícias 13
- Notícias 14
- Notícias País
- Notícias 15
- Notícias d'África
- Notícias 16
- Notícias 17
- Portugal em Rede
- Notícias Seis da Tarde
- Notícias Sete da Tarde
- Telejornal (8pm, simulcast with RTP1)
- Notícias 20 (if the Telejornal airs earlier)
- Notícias 21
- Contraponto
- Notícias Noite 1ª edição
- Notícias Noite 2ª edição
- 24 Horas (12am, title previously used as a late bulletin on RTP1)
- Notícias 1
- Notícias 2
- Notícias 3
- Notícias 4
- Notícias 5

=== Previous programmes ===
- Online 3
- Last Week Tonight with John Oliver
- Fareed Zakaria GPS (now included in the CNN Portugal programming)
