= Murphy v Media Protection Services Limited =

European Court of Justice case

Murphy v Media Protection Services Limited was 2011 decision on the European Court of Justice which concerned the use of foreign decoder devices to decrypt satellite TV service. The case concerned a British publican who used a Greek satellite company to screen matches in her pub rather than Sky. The Premier League had in Britain sold the rights to Broadcast games to Sky and ESPN. The court ruled that such exclusivity agreements were contrary to EU laws on free trade.
