= RTP Play =

Portuguese media service

- Website type: OTT video streaming platform
- Area served: Portugal; Limited programming and content availability abroad due to rights issues
- Owner: Rádio e Televisão de Portugal
- Website: www.rtp.pt/play/
- Launched: 6 January 2011; 15 years ago

RTP Play is the free streaming service owned by Rádio e Televisão de Portugal. The service was introduced in its current form on 6 January 2011 and includes live streams and on demand programming.

== History ==
RTP Play was created on 6 January 2011, as the replacement of the previous RTP Multimédia section. The platform was created entirely by Portuguese companies, such as create it, FullSIX and ClusterMedia Labs. Most of RTP's national content was available at launch, with the exception of some national TV series due to rights restrictions, similar to what happened with foreign series.

Per a 2018 RTP document, RTP planned to turn the platform into "a Portuguese Netflix", as well as plans to transpose Antena 1, 2 and 3 to visual radio codes, potentiate the online broadcasts and the introduction of new projects to cater to niche demographics, such as RTP Arena for gamers. With the rise of streaming services, radio and TV content was no longer properly sorted by channels, instead valuing its content. As of 2019, RTP Play housed over 200,000 content files in 2,800 programs and was accessed from 150 countries. A new version of the app was introduced in November 2019. As of August 2023, the RTP1 series Pôr do Sol was the most watched title on the platform.

On 19 June 2025, it premiered Lume, a Portuguese-Galician co-produced series about forest fires, simultaneously with the Max platform.
