= RTP Memória =

Portuguese television channel

- Country: Portugal
- Headquarters: Lisbon

Programming
- Picture format: 16:9 (576i, SDTV)

Ownership
- Owner: Rádio e Televisão de Portugal
- Sister channels: RTP1; RTP2; RTP Notícias; RTP Desporto; RTP Açores; RTP Madeira; RTP África; RTP Mundo; RTP Zig Zag

History
- Launched: 4 October 2004; 21 years ago

Links
- Website: rtpmemoria.pt

Availability

Terrestrial
- TDT: Channel 7

Streaming media
- RTP Play: http://www.rtp.pt/play/direto/rtpmemoria

RTP Memória (lit. transl. RTP Memory) is a Portuguese free-to-air television channel owned and operated by state-owned public broadcaster Rádio e Televisão de Portugal (RTP). It is the company's heritage television channel, and is known for broadcasting classic RTP original and foreign programming. It was launched on 4 October 2004.

Since 1 December 2016, the channel is available on DTT.

== History ==
The channel was initially intended to launch in April 2004 alongside RTPN. Light blue was chosen as its color.

== Logos and identities ==
RTP Memória's first logo and former logo used from 4 October 2004 to 17 October 2015.

RTP Memória's second and previous logo from 18 October 2015 to 29 March 2026.

== TV series ==
- All in the Family (Uma Família às Direitas)
- Charlie's Angels (Os Anjos de Charlie)
- The High Chaparral
- Hill Street Blues (Balada de Hill Street)
- Poirot
- ALF
- MacGyver (On air, weekends since June 2011)
- Carson's Law
- The Persuaders!
- Mission: Impossible (Missão Impossível)
- The Saint (O Santo)
- Bonanza
- Monty Python
- 'Allo 'Allo!
- La piovra (O Polvo)
- Quick Draw McGraw
- Looney Tunes
- Upstairs, Downstairs
- Knight Rider (O Justiceiro)
- Sherlock Holmes
- Who's The Boss? (Chefe, mas Pouco...) (On air, weekdays since June 2011)
- Space: 1999 (Espaço: 1999) (On air, weekdays since June 2011)
- Duarte e Companhia
