= ARTV (Portuguese TV channel) =

- Country: Portugal
- Broadcast area: Portugal
- Headquarters: Lisbon

Programming
- Picture format: 16:9 (SDTV)

History
- Launched: 1998

Links
- Website: Canal Parlamento

Availability

Terrestrial
- TDT: Channel 5

ARTV, also known as Canal Parlamento, is a Portuguese legislature television station that broadcast events from the Assembly of the Republic.

== History ==
The channel launched in 1998 as Canal Parlamento, before renaming to its current name in September 2002, with Canal Parlamento being only a subtitle in the channel's logo. At the time, it was finding presenters to "humanize" its broadcasts, as well as preparing the creation of reports and documentaries.

Terrestrial trials were conducted on December 27, 2012 and regular transmission on January 3, 2013, in order to bring its coverage more "universal and democratic". The channel runs as a limited service.
