= RTP1 =

Main television channel of Rádio e Televisão de Portugal

- Logo used since 2026
- Country: Portugal
- Broadcast area: Portugal, reaching Spain via overspill of the Portuguese terrestrial network
- Headquarters: Lisbon (main); Porto (secondary)

Programming
- Language: Portuguese
- Picture format: 1080i HDTV (downscaled to 576i for the SDTV feed)

Ownership
- Owner: Rádio e Televisão de Portugal
- Sister channels: RTP2; RTP Notícias; RTP Desporto; RTP Memória; RTP Açores; RTP Madeira; RTP África; RTP Mundo; RTP Zig Zag

History
- Launched: 7 March 1957; 69 years ago
- Former names: RTP (1957−68); I Programa (1968−78); RTP Canal 1 (1989−96)

Links
- Website: www.rtp.pt/rtp1

Availability

Terrestrial
- TDT: Channel 1 (SD)

Streaming media
- RTP Play: https://www.rtp.pt/play/direto/rtp1 (Portugal only)

RTP1 (RTP um) is a Portuguese free-to-air television channel owned and operated by state-owned public broadcaster Rádio e Televisão de Portugal (RTP). It is the company's flagship television channel, and is known for broadcasting mainstream and generalist programming, including Telejornal news bulletins, prime time drama, cinema and entertainment, and major breaking news, sports and special events.

It was launched on 7 March 1957 as the first regular television service in Portugal. It was the only one until 25 December 1968, when RTP launched a second channel. Two regional channels followed, RTP Madeira on 6 August 1972 and RTP Açores on 10 August 1975. As RTP held a monopoly on television broadcasting in the country, they were the only television channels until the first commercial television was launched on 6 October 1992, when SIC started broadcasting nationwide.

The channel was initially simply referred to as "RTP". It received other names, such as "I Programa" and "RTP Canal 1" until it adopted its current name "RTP1". It is one of the most watched television networks in the country. The channel became a 24-hour service in 2002, although it now leases its graveyard slot (3 am to 6 am on average) to infomercials. Until that point, RTP1 closed down with the national anthem, but this practice stopped not too long before infomercials filled the overnight slots. Unlike RTP2, RTP1 broadcasts commercial advertising, which, along with the license fee, finances the channel.

== History ==
=== Experimental broadcasts ===
RTP was established on 15 December 1955 as the national television service, under Article 1 of Decree nº 40 341.

Test broadcasts were first conducted on September 4, 1956, at the now-defunct Feira Popular amusement park in Lisbon. At 21:30 that evening, a speech was made by Raúl Feio, in the Nervos program, introducing viewers to television, considered at that time to be "one of the greatest revelations of our time", and stating that the television service would enter the definitive stage in 1957, with hopes for the five transmitters to be active by then, locating the transmitters on a map. The inaugural program was followed by RTP's first continuity announcer, Maria Armanda Falcão, announcing the remaining line-up for the evening. These consisted of:

- Revista Desportiva: a sports program fronted by Domingos Lança Moreira, featuring an interview with the winner of the 1956 Volta a Portugal, Alves Barbosa;
- A filmed documentary about Lisbon, produced by Fernando Garcia;
- Música e Artistas, featuring a concert with violinist Leonor de Sousa Prado and pianist Nella Maissa;
- Revista Mundial (the first news service), featuring among its topics the war in Algeria, flooding in Austria and a trip between Madrid and Monza in a car from 1906. The reports were provided by United Press Television.

Raúl Feio returned to finish the broadcast. The experiments continued throughout September, and tropospheric propagation helped increase the reception. These experimental broadcasts resumed on December 3, delayed from the initial plan in November. These experimental broadcasts consisted of filmed documentaries, slides and test patterns. Daily, a pre-recorded continuity announcement was made by Gina Esteves about the reception of RTP's signal and how to obtain a television set. Throughout December (excluding Sundays) the experiments consisted largely of music videos, American imports and filmed features from France made for television. The line-up plans changed in the second half of January 1957 the signal was being tested between 17:00 and 19:00 and again between 21:00 and 22:30; the tests weren't conducted on Wednesday nights. The afternoon period started with slides for 45 minutes, then 15 minutes of technical test programming, ending at 18:00, with an hour of films interspersed with slides, the second period at 21:00 started with 5 minutes of slides, then filmed content until 22:30, ending with sign-off slides. RTP broadcast 71 hours of filmed programming in the month (including fifteen documentaries made in Portugal) and 22 hours of test patterns. Regular continuity announcements were added on February 5, and on February 15, a new newscast, Jornal de Actualidades. Its first large-scale coverage of an event was the visit of Elizabeth II to Portugal.

=== Early years ===
Regular broadcasts commenced on 7 March 1957. An announcement made at the start of the broadcast stated that these broadcasts weren't definitive as of yet, seeing that the tests would run for a few more months. The broadcast started at 21:30, and with that came the first airing of the Derby Day march (by Robert Farnon) on television. RTP wanted to commission a march used to open its daily schedule, but since the task was time-consuming, the problem was then solved upon finding a bunch of Chapell discs to later select the track. The first announcer in the regular period, Maria Helena Varela Santos, announced the evening's line-up and was followed by a speech by Domingos de Mascarenhas about RTP's future. Technical problems were seen throughout the night, including a number of issues with sound.

The first televised play (Monólogo do Vaqueiro) was broadcast on March 11. The first film (Fado: História de uma Cantadeira) ran on March 13. Its first operations outside Portugal were done by the news team in Barcelona, followed by coverage of the official visit of President Craveiro Lopes to Brazil in June 1957. Another crew was sent to capture the eruption of the Capelinhos volcano in the Azores in October.

Initially, RTP had a limited coverage area, using 5 transmitters (Monsanto, Montejunto, Lousã, Monte da Virgem and Foia) that covered about 60% of the country's population. Per the 1956 yearly report, the initial goal of starting all five transmitters by March 1957 was failed, due to issues regarding the terrain that was going to be used for the building of the transmitters. The basic network wasn't complete until April 1958. By the time the network was finished, the signals were received by 58% of the population.

Out of RTP's 665 hours of programming in 1957, dozens were devoted to sports programming. Game shows were also central to RTP's launch year, the first game show was broadcast on April 5, 1957; the winning prize being a television set. Technical difficulties hit RTP frequently in its early years. João Villaret's program was hit by a swarm of bugs on October 21, 1960.

In October 1958, the administration demanded the creation of commercials made specifically for television; on December 31, 1958, an agreement was made between the radio stations members of the Pool. Advertising was the solution to curb the problems caused by the relatively high television tax. On February 9, 1958, the first soccer match was broadcast. That same year, Natal dos Hospitais was broadcast on television for the first time, and in 1959, emphasis was put on outside programming, in order to diversify its contents. Among such broadcasts was the inauguration of the Cristo-Rei monument on May 17.

On June 12, 1959, TV Rural was first broadcast. Engineer Sousa Veloso hosted it throughout its existence; the program was also relatively cheap to produce at the time of starting. Associated-Rediffusion visited Lisbon in the same month and accepted a special hour of programming, that wasn't attractive for most of its viewers, aside from a few documentaries in the Hora Inglesa strand that ran for a week. On October 18, Jornal de Actualidades was replaced by Telejornal with two editions, the main one at 20:30 with half an hour, and a late edition before sign-off, that rarely happened after 23:30. The first presenters were Mário Pires and Alberto Lopes, but the choice made by RTP was seen as flawed. The newscast suffered constant cuts from the censors, as well as technical problems

Broadcasts from the Monte da Virgem studios in Vila Nova de Gaia started on October 20, 1959.

Portugal's link to the Eurovision network was complete on December 1, 1965 and the first experiment between Portugal and Spain was made on January 31, 1966. The first broadcasts from the network was made in 1960, and with varying levels of quality.

Starting November 1, 1961, the weather reports were now seen in-vision from meteorologists, this time after the main news, as opposed to the late news, like it was before. The most famous weatherman, Anthímio de Azevedo, didn't join RTP until 1964. The 1960s also marked the arrival of the videotape technology to the broadcaster. A contract with Movierecord Portuguesa SARL was signed on September 26, 1962, eyeing to exploit advertising slots. At the end of 1963, Lever was the most-advertised company on television, but the most-advertised product was the Sical coffee brand. Around this time, more filmed imports started running, mostly from the United Kingdom and the United States. Under government initiative, programming for schools made its test run on January 6, 1964.

=== Two channels under one administration ===
It was the only TV channel available in Portugal until 25 December 1968, when RTP2 started broadcasting. Because of that, RTP had to identify both channels as I Programa and II Programa in order to distinguish them.

1969 was marked with one of the first successful talk-shows on Portuguese television, the variety show Zip-Zip, that ran between May and December, as well as live coverage of the Moon landing.

Daytime broadcasts commenced in May 1970, with a two-hour period running at various times mostly between 12:45 and 14:30. Before then, Telescola (educational classes) were generally the first programmes of the day and the regular schedule started at 19:00, running until midnight.

A "unilateral" with Brazilian technicians helped provide RTP with assistance to produce live carriage of the solemn delivery to Brazil of the mortal remains of its Emperor D. Pedro I on April 22, 1972. Days later the news team also provided details of the visit of the Portuguese president of the time to Brazil. Telejornal produced 1486 editions in 1972 alone, totalling 380 hours, whereas sporting events totalled 409 years, thanks in part to the 1972 Summer Olympics in Munich carried from the Eurovision network.

During the Carnation Revolution, RTP was occupied on April 25, 1974 by elements of the Armed Forces Movement. As consequence of the occupation, the channel had its lineup changed.

In 1974, RTP's ratings grew with the expansion of the acquisition of television sets in the country. The first colour broadcasts were conducted in 1976, with the legislative elections.

RTP 1 broadcast the first telenovela in Portugal, the Brazilian series Gabriela from TV Globo, in May 1977. Its success was extremely high, with accounts of politicians watching the series religiously. On Mondays, the telenovela was followed by the successful gameshow A Visita da Cornélia.

=== Becoming separate ===
On 16 October 1977, the channel was renamed RTP-1 (initially hyphenated), in line with the separation of the second channel's editorial team. RTP1's separate editorial team was entrusted to journalist Vasco Graça Moura; the two channels were also granted separate news teams. The new administration improved the quality of the programming, despite having limited resources. A massive telethon was held on 16 December 1978, running for 17 hours.

PAL colour programming was now in production, being selected in detriment of the SECAM format, and a heat of Jeux Sans Frontières on 5 September 1979 had to be transmitted in said technology in order to air to the rest of Europe, which already had regular colour broadcasts at the time. As the months progressed, more and more colour broadcasts were included with experimental broadcasts approved on 15 February 1980, with colour test cards being shown from 18 February, before launching regularly on 7 March 1980, symbolically its 23rd anniversary, with the final of the 1980 Festival da Canção, which gave José Cid a place in that year's edition in the Netherlands. On 16 November 1980, a special program was broadcast marking the beginning of satellite links to the Azores and Madeira islands, enabling both RTP Açores and RTP Madeira to air live programming from the mainland.

On 15 February 1982, daytime broadcasts were resumed following a brief period where the slot was abolished. The closing time (23:00) was kept in order to cut energy consumption. It was scheduled that by October the broadcasts would encompass the entire afternoon. This plan wasn't properly achieved as the Ciclo Preparatório TV educational broadcasts were still reserved to air in a five-hour period (13:30 to 18:30). In compensation the channel gained its breakfast program, Bom Dia Portugal (styled Bom Dia, Portugal!), the first such national program on European television, from 08:00 to 09:30. With this, RTP1 broadcast on average 14 to 15 hours a day, with the afternoon interruption for the educational service. It also premiered Vila Faia, the first Portuguese telenovela. In June 1983, after nearly nine months, Bom Dia, Portugal! was cancelled by RTP. Plans to bring it back later in the year were later shelved.

In October 1983, the daytime period was abolished in order to save energy. Weekday broadcasts were then restricted to start at 17:00 and end at 23:00. Said broadcasts were resumed in 1985, when RTP decided to broadcast the daytime block from Oporto. In April that year, Totoloto draws were televised for the first time, with the creation of the lottery. The educational broadcasts (then known as Ciclo Preparatório TV) were abolished in 1988. By then, daytime shutdowns were abolished.

In 1984, the Portuguese adaptation of 1, 2, 3 premiered. A weekly newscast for children, Jornalinho, came in the same year. The coverage of the 1984 Summer Olympics was the largest so far back then.

1986 saw the return of the extended late bulletin 24 Horas. One of the longest-running programs, TV Rural, ended on 15 September 1990, in the middle of a process of reforms at the corporation. After the 1988 Humor de Perdição scandal, Herman José returned to the channel in January 1990 with Casino Royal.

=== Rebranding as Canal 1 ===
Towards the end of the 1980s, RTP was facing challenges with the impending arrival of private broadcasters. As a result, RTP decided to rename RTP1 as RTP Canal 1, in readiness for a bigger rebrand that happened on 17 September 1990, where the channel was now officially rebranded as Canal 1, removing any direct references to the RTP name, in order to reinforce its position in front of the new broadcasters. This phase was marked by a heavy number of imports on air, with RTP buying a higher number of "quality" imports, in contrast with previous years. The reface also saw the premiere of new game shows adapted from international formats, Roda da Sorte (Wheel of Fortune), Casa Cheia (Bob's Full House), O Preço Certo (The Price is Right) and a return of 1, 2, 3. The start of the Gulf War in January 1991 saw a historical operation with long hours of news.

Having lost its leadership status slowly between 1994 and 1995, owing to SIC's success, it eventually turned into the vice-leader before falling into third place, when TVI got a ratings boost.

=== Reverting back to the RTP1 name ===
On 29 April 1996, Canal 1 reverted back to its original name RTP1, alongside a full rebranding of the channel.

On 31 March 2004, RTP1 rebranded entirely now broadcasting from RTP's new headquarters.

The channel started widescreen tests on 8 June 2012 with the Euro 2012 opening ceremony and the first match (Poland vs. Greece). On 14 January 2013, the channel formally became a widescreen channel.

== Logos and identities ==
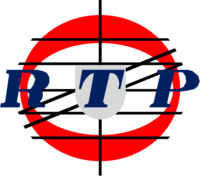
March 1957 to 1959 (as I Programa from 1968 to 1978 to distinguish itself from RTP2)

1959 to 1976

1977 to 1979

February 1981 to 21 March 1983

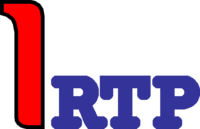
July 1983 to 17 October 1983

18 October 1983 to 22 March 1984

23 March 1984 to December 1985

December 1985 to 17 October 1986

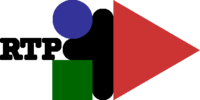
17 October 1986 to 2 December 1988

September 1989 to 16 September 1990 (as RTP Canal 1)

17 September 1990 to 28 September 1995 (as Canal 1 da RTP).

29 September 1995 to 11 October 1998

12 October 1998 to 27 October 2001

28 October 2001 to 31 March 2004

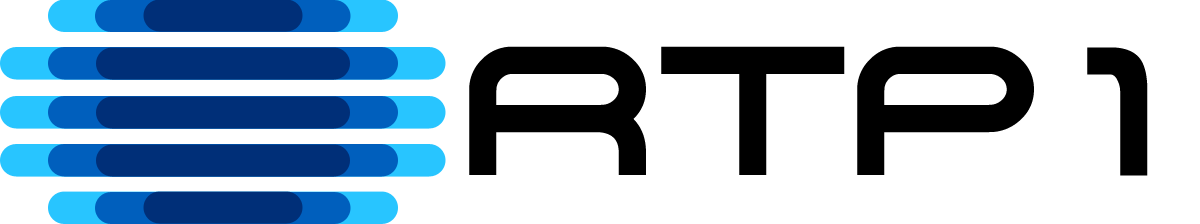
31 March 2004 to 6 March 2016

7 March 2016 to 29 March 2026

Since 30 March 2026

== Programmes ==
=== News ===
- Bom Dia Portugal
- Jornal da Tarde
- Portugal em Rede (simulcast with RTP Notícias)
- Edição Especial (only on special occasions)
- Última Hora (breaking news)
- Telejornal
- A Prova dos Factos

=== Variety shows ===
- Praça da Alegria – a daily variety talk-show broadcast on weekdays between 10 a.m. and 1 pm. It targets the more elderly and illiterate part of the population, with human interest stories, and does not broadcast in summer.
- A Nossa Tarde – another daily variety talk-show also broadcast on weekdays between 3 p.m. and 6 pm. Also features interviews, live performances and human interest stories, but with a broader target and appeal. These two talk-shows are often criticized for their long running time, less educated target demographics and for competing with other private television stations with the same format, at the same times of the day. Does not broadcast in the summer.
- Aqui Portugal – The program that travels and warms hearts from north to south of the country, showing the best that Portugal has to offer. A journey to discover the culture, gastronomy and local traditions, always with plenty of music to liven up the weekends. ( Ended in 2024 )
- Verão Total – is a summer show used to fill in for "Praça da Alegria" and "A Nossa Tarde". The show is broadcast from a different town every day. ( Ended in 2015 )

=== TV series ===
==== Portuguese ====
- Auga Seca

==== American ====
- The Flash
- Longmire
- Major Crimes (Crimes Graves)
- Pinkalicious & Peterrific (La Rose de Curioso La) (upcoming)

=== Animation ===
- The Simpsons*
- DuckTales*
- Tiny Toon Adventures*
- Darkwing Duck*
- Animaniacs
- Quack Pack
- Doug
- Timon & Pumbaa

*Aired dubbed in English with Portuguese subtitles or dubbed in Brazilian Portuguese

=== Entertainment ===
- Eurovision Song Contest
- Festival da Canção
- Got Talent Portugal
- Joker
- The Price Is Right (O Preço Certo)
- The Voice Portugal
- Taskmaster

=== Late-night talk shows ===
- 5 Para A Meia-Noite
- Cá Por Casa com Herman José
- Depois Vai-se A Ver E Nada
- Prova Oral

=== Music festivals ===
- NOS Alive

=== Documentaries or infotainment ===
- Portugueses pelo Mundo

==== Exclusive broadcasting rights ====
- NOS Audiovisuais
- Constantin Film
- BBC Films
- Rai Fiction
- Pathé
- Lifetime/TF1 International

==== Co-shared broadcasting rights ====
- Warner Bros./New Line Cinema (first-run rights, second-run rights co-shared with SIC)
- Columbia Pictures/TriStar Pictures (rights co-shared with SIC)
- 20th Century Studios/Regency Enterprises (rights co-shared with SIC and TVI)
- Universal Studios/Focus Features (rights co-shared with SIC and TVI)

== Controversies ==
In 1976, RTP was forced to cancel the programme Nome Mulher after a controversial instalment of the program highlighted the illegal abortion trade in Portugal.

The channel on September 21, 1983 aired the Italian film Duck with Orange Sauce, replacing Far from the Madding Crowd 24 hours before its airing. Owing to the film's high quality, it was reprogrammed to October (it ended up airing on October 19). Upon the airing of the Italian film, erroneously considered to be a pornographic title, some of its scenes and dialogue caused a high amount of phone calls to RTP. Luís Andrade (who would effectively become director of programming on October 17) announced at the end of the film that it was a last-minute replacement and that a report was already underway to find the responsabilities. The following day, RTP's management council issued an announcement saying that they considered the film to be "inappropriate" to air on its channels and that "severe disciplinary measures" would be applied. According to Expresso, 18 phone calls were received against the film, while 48 were against Luís Andrade. The film's distributor profited from the situation and put it into circulation again the following week at the Hollywood cinema in Alvalade. For years, it was believed that the film aired incomplete on RTP, with a blank screen being shown for minutes; an off-air VHS recording was unearthed in 2026, coupled with the channel's running order for that day, it was revealed that the movie ran for 101 minutes (the official length) divided into four parts, with the recording reaching the end of the film. Another false memory exists regarding the announcement, which some people believed to last a few minutes, when, actually, it ran for thirty seconds. The council's announcement would not be released to the press until the following day.

In 1988, Herman José's Humor de Perdição was put under fire because of the Historical Interviews series of sketches presenting an interview to Elizabeth of Portugal.

In 1995, Catholic groups and Rádio Renascença put RTP under pressure for airing the infamous "Last Supper" special edition of Herman ZAP. As a result, it and Parabéns were both pulled.
