= RTP Zig Zag =

Portuguese children's programming block

- Genre: Children
- Country of origin: Portugal
- Original language: Portuguese

Production
- Producer: Rádio e Televisão de Portugal

Original release
- Network: RTP2; RTP Mundo
- Release: 2004 – present

RTP Zig Zag is a Portuguese children's programming block broadcast daily on RTP2, RTP1 and RTP Mundo from Portugal. It airs programming that is targeted for young people (children and teenagers) from ages 3–17. It airs daily on the weekdays from 07:00 to 11:15 WET, and again later on in the day from 16:00 to 20:05 WET. It airs programming in Portuguese.

== History ==
The block emerged in 2004 after prior concerns on the airing of violent cartoons on terrestrial television networks. Per a 1999 study, RTP's two channels were known for having violent children's programming, in 2003, Heloísa Apolónia was aware that her four-year-old daughter was singing the opening lyrics to the theme of Class King Yamazaki, an anime series RTP was airing on its channels at the time, which she perceived as violent. Her party began to start a project to monitor RTP's children's programming.

== Radar XS ==
Radar XS is a news program for children, which doesn't tackle the news events of the week. Created in 2019 after a four-year hiatus following the closure of Diário XS (created in 2010), it is a weekly program.

== Rádio Zig Zag ==
Rádio Zig Zag started broadcasting on 19 September 2016 after successive recommendations initiated in 2010 and 2015, which oversaw the creation of a dedicated radio station aimed at children in their formative years. As of 2022, it was airing 78 programs, all of which were produced in-house.
