= Television in Angola =

Television in Angola was introduced in 1973 at an experimental level with regular broadcasts starting in 1975, the year of Angola’s independence. There was only one local television channel until 2000, when TPA opened its second channel. The first private television station opened in 2008, ending a 33-year monopoly period.

The country uses the PAL format for analog and ISDB-T for digital. Angola became the second African country (after Botswana) to deploy the standard. Implementation of the digital terrestrial system has been sluggish, being announced in 2011, with the first tests being co-ordinated by engineers from Brazilian state company Inatel. As of August 2025, investments worth US$10 million are being made for the implementation of basic ISDB-T equipment.

== History ==
=== Early tests ===
Closed circuit tests were conducted when Angola was under Portugal's colonial rule: the first was made in 1962, from Rádio Clube do Huambo. On January 8, 1964, Rádio Clube de Benguela made the second experiment. In 1969, the Portuguese government is forced to recognize the urgence and need of the establishment of television services in its overseas possessions, in favor of the regime, at the short term. On June 22, 1970, Luanda tested television for the first time, with the attempt of televising the radio show Café da Noite. In 1972, there was also a proposal for TVA (which started in 1974) which failed, as the government had favored a television station set up by RTP.

Television, however, was seen as a taboo topic by the Portuguese colonial mindset of the time, in the sense that it boycotted, in every way, the need for the Angolan people to inform and educate. RTP's project for overseas television stations became an "on paper" project that ultimately never materialized.

=== Monopoly phase ===
Radiotelevisão Portuguesa de Angola (RPA), the progenitor to the current TPA, was established by the colonial authorities on June 27, 1973; subsequently, in 1974, the term "Portuguesa" was replaced by "Popular"; it then started broadcasting on October 18, 1975, shortly before Angola became independent (on November 11). Few receivers in Luanda were able to see it at launch. In June 1976, it was nationalized by the ruling MPLA party and renamed Televisão Popular de Angola (TPA). Beginning in 1979, TPA started its expansion project, which included MPLA strongholds and key UNITA stronghold Huamno, mostly to disseminate officialist information. Few people, however, still had television, as, in 1988, US estimates believe that the number of television sets was fixed at 40,500.

TPA launched a second channel, limited to Luanda, in 2000, which by 2004, was already seen in other provinces, namely Cabinda, Benguela, Huambo and Huíla. Beginning in 2000, TPA started investing in local fiction, in an attempt to lure a wider viewing audience than the one used to Globo's telenovelas, which had a predominantly urban audience. Portuguese and Brazilian influence was also starting to appear, in order to improve TPA's public image. This coincided with the rise of subscription television with foreign channels, which was starting to gain a foothold.

=== Breaking the monopoly ===
TV Zimbo launched on December 14, 2008, as the first private television station in Angola, breaking a 33-year monopoly. Its launch also implied the end of state control on all television news services within Angola. New private channels emerged, but not on terrestrial television, being instead limited to subscription platforms: Zap Novelas, the first specialized channel, produced in Portugal at first, launched in 2010, followed by Zap Viva, a general interest channel, in 2012. These first two were owned by ZAP. In 2014, Banda TV launched on DStv, followed by Palanca TV on the same platform in 2015. The Africa Magic network gained a Lusophone channel, Jango Magic, in 2014, and, in 2022, an Angola-specific channel, Kwenda Magic.

== Subscription television ==
Pay television was introduced in 1998 when Jembas - Assistência Técnica started distributing the DStv service. DStv was followed by the Visabeira-owned TV Cabo, which set up its network in 2002 and launched in 2006. Angola Telecom and Infrasat launched UAU! TV in 2009, a 12-channel DTH service whose infrastructure was 100% national.

In April 2010, ZAP launched under a 70-30 split between Isabel dos Santos and Portuguese company ZON (currently NOS). The company catered the high- and mid-end sectors of the population at launch and was sketching the installation of a fiber network in 2014.

== Channels ==
The following is a list of television channels broadcast in Angola.

=== Main channels ===
Name	Owner	Type	Launched
TPA 1	Government of Angola	Public-owned	1975
TPA 2	Government of Angola	Public-owned	2000
TPA Notícias	Government of Angola	Public-owned	2022
TV Zimbo	Grupo Medianova	Private	2008

=== Subscription channels ===
Channels from Portugal, including some international feeds, are also available.

Name	Owner	Format	Launched
TV Girassol	Rede Girassol	Generalist	2022
Globo Internacional África	Grupo Globo	Generalist	2000
Zap Viva	ZAP	Entertainment	2012
Zap Novelas	ZAP	Entertainment	2010
Kwenda Magic	DStv	Entertainment	2022
Globo On	Grupo Globo	Entertainment	2015
Star Mundo	The Walt Disney Company	Entertainment	2015
Banda TV	unknown	Entertainment	2014
Z Sports 1	ZAP and Mediapro	Sports	2015
Z Sports 2	ZAP and Mediapro	Sports	2015
Z Sports 3	ZAP and Mediapro	Sports	2015
Kanuca TV	Kanuca TV	Children	2012
BEKuduro	unknown	Music	2015

=== Former channels ===
Name	Owner	Type	Launched	Closed	Reason
TPA Internacional	Government of Angola	Public-owned	2008	2022	Replaced by TPA Notícias
+Novelas	ZAP	Private	2013	2015	Channel slot replaced by Globo On
Bom Deus	Igreja Fraternidade Evangélica de Pentecostes na África em Angola	Private (religious)	unknown	unknown	unknown
Boom TV	Seven TV	Private	2014	2021	Shut down
Só Novelas	Seven TV	Private	2014	2021	Shut down

== Government control ==
Since its inception, television has been used as a one-sided propaganda tool in favor of the MPLA, the ruling party since independence. Early expansion projects during the civil war were predominantly ideological in nature. During the television monopoly, television in Angola was a mere propaganda tool, even after the first multi-party elections in 1992 and the end of the civil war in 2002. This was more noticeable on Telejornal, shown on TPA 1 every evening. The tone is voluntaristic, all information seen is positive and it carries meticulous details of the government's agenda. From 2000 to 2002, the civil war had a heavy influence on television programming. After the civil war ended, several MPLA-backed programs calling for the reconstruction of Angola as well as its development (such as Reconstrução Angola) were seen on TPA.

In the first half of 2017, ZAP and later DStv removed SIC Internacional and SIC Notícias from their packages after airing reports critical of the regime. SIC's other channels, available on ZAP, remained unaffected, as they don't carry news.

Censorship on Angolan television increased after the 2017 "witch hunt" on Isabel dos Santos and her family, after her father, José Eduardo dos Santos, ended his 38-year presidency of both MPLA and Angola, being replaced by João Lourenço. The first major event was the crisis involving Coréon Du's production company Semba Comunicação, who withdrew its partnership with TPA 2 and TPA Internacional in 2017. The situation deteriorated in 2021, when MINTTICS decided to suspend three channels that had an opposition stance: ZAP Viva, Vida TV (owned by Tchizé dos Santos) and RecordTV África (owned by a foreigner, linked to the Universal Church of the Kingdom of God, which has had a tense relationship with MPLA.

Several television channels that were set up as private outlets to counter the domination of the ruling party have since fallen under the influence of the state. TV Zimbo was nationalized in 2020, but announced its intent to reprivatize in 2021. Palanca TV, due to financial issues, was also nationalized in 2020, closing in 2022 being integrated into TPA. The recent Rede Girassol, owner of TV Girassol, is the "white elephant" of the government and is accused of acts of nepotism.

TV Raiar, an opposition channel, is available exclusively on satellite and is linked to UNITA, who was the opposing force in the civil war. In 2017, Multichoice denied claims regarding its affiliation.

== See also ==
- Lists of television channels
