= List of Portuguese-language television channels =

The following is a list of Portuguese language television channels.

== Cape Verde ==
- AXN Dublado – series and movies
- Rádio e Televisão de Cabo Verde – state broadcaster
- RTP África
- RTP1 – Portugal programming
- RTP2 – Portugal programming
- SIC Notícias – Portugal programming
- SIC Mulher – Portugal programming
- SIC Radical – Portugal programming
- SIC Internacional – Portugal programming
- TVI Internacional – Portugal programming
- Euronews – portuguese news
- Disney Channel Portugal
- Disney Jr. Portugal
- TV Globo Internacional
- TV Record Internacional
- Record News
- RBTi
- Zap Rock
- Zap Blues
- Zap Jazz
- Zap Dance Clubbin
- Zap Easy Listening
- Zap Hip Hop
- Zap Trance
- Zap Reggae
- Zap The Chill Lounge
- Zap 80's
- Zap 90's
- Zap Pop
- Zap Greatest Hits
- Zap Classic Music
- Zap Afro Beat
- Zap Programaçao
- Z Sports 1 HD
- Z Sports 2 HD
- Z Sports LaLiga HD
- Zap Viva HD
- Zap Novelas HD
- Zap Viva
- Zap Novelas
- SuperSport Màximo 1
- SuperSport Màximo 2
- SuperSport Màximo 3
- SuperSport Màximo 360

== Guinea-Bissau ==
- Guinea-Bissau Television
- EM TV Guinea-Bissau
- RTP África

== Macau ==
- Canal Macau

== São Tomé and Príncipe ==
- Televisão Santomense
- RTP África

== International Portuguese channels ==
- RTP Mundo
- RTP África
- SIC Internacional
- SIC Notícias
- TVI Internacional
- TV Globo Internacional (North America, South America, Europe, Africa, Japan)
- Record Internacional (Europe, Africa, North America, Japan)
- RBTi (North America, Europe)
- Band Internacional (North America, Europe, Africa)
- PFC Internacional (North America, South America, Europe, Africa)
- Band News (North America)

== United States ==
- The Portuguese Channel
- SPT TV

== See also ==
- Lists of television channels
