= Txillo =

- Broadcast area: Portugal
- Headquarters: Paço de Arcos, Oeiras, Lisbon

Programming
- Language(s): Portuguese
- Picture format: 1080i HDTV (downscaled to 576i for the SDTV feed)

Ownership
- Owner: Impresa
- Sister channels: SIC Notícias; SIC Radical; SIC Mulher; SIC K SIC Caras; SIC Internacional

History
- Launched: 6 October 2014; 10 years ago

Txillo (formerly DStv Kids) was a Portuguese-licensed channel targeting the Angolan and Mozambican markets.

== History ==
SIC received a license from ERC on October 29, 2014 and started broadcasting on November 17, with its programming handled by SIC's staff at its facilities in Carnaxide.

On the day of its fourth anniversary, on November 17, 2018, the channel was renamed Txillo. The rebrand coincided with the introduction of new shows.

On March 31, 2024, Txillo shut down, under the guise of a suspension, which SIC announced that it would find a new partner. However, without finding a new provider by year-end 2024, the plans fell through and the license was revoked on April 2, 2025.
