= SIC Comédia =

- Country: Portugal
- Broadcast area: Portugal

Programming
- Picture format: 4:3 (576i, SDTV)

Ownership
- Owner: Impresa
- Sister channels: SIC; SIC Notícias; SIC Radical; SIC Mulher; SIC Internacional

History
- Launched: 29 June 2000; 25 years ago
- Closed: 31 December 2006; 19 years ago
- Former names: SIC Gold (29 June 2000 – 29 April 2002); SIC Sempre Gold (29 April 2002 – 18 October 2004)

Links
- Website: siccomedia.sapo.pt

SIC Comédia was a Portuguese TV channel, available on cable. It was part of the television network SIC (Sociedade Independente de Comunicação). It closed on 31 December 2006.

The channel aired shows such as Seinfeld, The Tonight Show, Late Night with Conan O'Brien, Cheers, The Benny Hill Show, M*A*S*H, Benson, Saturday Night Live, 'Allo 'Allo!, Comedy Inc., Mad About You, Everybody Loves Raymond, Frasier, My Hero, Alas Smith and Jones, The War Next Door. It also showed home-grown products (either reruns from the main channel or original commissions), such as Biqueirada, HermanSic and Prazer dos Diabos.

It is now defunct, because TVCabo, Portugal's main cable provider, decided to drop it despite a petition for it to continue. On TVCabo, Fox Life replaced it, and on TVTEL (another Portuguese cable provider), SIC Mulher got the spot.

== History ==
=== SIC Gold ===
The channel was announced by SIC in January 2000 as SIC Gold as part of the channel's plans to enter the cable television market. The director of programs for the two channels (the other being SIC Radical), Francisco Penim, was appointed on 14 April 2000. The initial purpose of the channel was to carry programming from SIC's archives, similar to what RTP Memória has done since 2004. The channel was set to begin operations on 26 June 2000 but the lack of action from the regulatory body delayed its launch. The channel eventually started broadcasting on 29 June, achieving good ratings, equiparable to the most-watched Portuguese-language basic cable channels of the time.

The channel was put into court for the unauthorized reruns of a program from the channel's first year, Sexo Forte, in a lawsuit filed by presenter Paula Moura Pinheiro. These reruns were broadcast in the summer of 2000, which the presenter objected. The Court of Oeiras ruled in favor of Paula Moura Pinheiro in June 2002, with SIC paying around €6,400 for the presenter in copyrights.

=== SIC Sempre Gold ===
On April 12, 2002, SIC announced that the channel was to be renamed at SIC Sempre Gold effective April 29. The line-up was changed to include subtitled American television series, broadcast at the time of RTP's monopoly, with the aim of lowering the age target to 35 years, and attracting more viewers. American content scheduled to air in the first phase included Falcon Crest, ALF, Fame and the miniseries Roots (the first two daily and the last two weekly) and, in a second phase (under negotiations at the time), The Love Boat, Dallas and Little House on the Prairie.

Although the channel started as the third most watched cable channel in 2000, even with a repositioning in 2002, its ratings began to fall, eventually leading to the end of the SIC Gold format.

=== SIC Comédia ===
On October 3, 2004, SIC revealed that it would replace SIC Sempre Gold with an all-new channel, SIC Comédia. Its director was Francisco Penim, in charge of the theme channels, while its director of programming was Ricardo Palacin and Nuno Markl served as the channel's announcer. The channel opened at 7:30pm on 18 October 2004 with 'Allo 'Allo!. 9pm was reserved on weeknights for The Tonight Show and Late Night with Conan O'Brien, both from NBC. National programming started only with repeats of existing SIC comedy productions, those being Não há Pai, O Programa da Maria, Residencial Tejo and Os Trapalhões em Portugal. There would be no fixed programming blocks and it aimed to become among the most watched channels on cable, as well as doing better results than SIC Gold. New sitcoms, as well as the possibility of airing content with the main SIC channel simultaneously.

The channel's first live format, talk show Prazer dos Diabos, made its first airing on November 16, 2005, followed by its first original sitcom, O Quadrado das Bermudas, on December 7.
