= Vida TV =

- Broadcast area: Angola; Mozambique

Programming
- Language: Portuguese

Ownership
- Owner: Tchizé dos Santos

History
- Launched: 4 March 2019
- Closed: 21 April 2021

Vida TV was an Angolan satellite television channel owned by Tchizé dos Santos, daughter of former Angolan president José Eduardo dos Santos. It broadcast on the DStv platform throughout its existence and was one of the three channels closed in April 2021 by government orders. In June 2021, the channel was officially made defunct.

== History ==
Vida TV was announced in October 2018 for launch on the DStv platform and inherited most of Semba's team and programs they made for TPA 2, which at the beginning of that year devolved into TPA. ZAP rejected the channel under the grounds that it was affiliated to the dos Santos family, whereas the channel, which could not register under the Angolan regulator, was forced to find a loophole by registering it in Spain. Programs were recorded at its studios at Fidel Castro Avenue in Luanda, and announced recruitment of new talents for the coming weeks.

On 4 March 2019 at 9pm, Vida TV started broadcasting with revived versions of former TPA 2 programs: kudurist program Sempre a Subir, talk show Hora Quente, Tchilar, Dia-a-Dia, Pato and Flash.

On 1 May 2021, Vida TV unveiled a new line-up and the premiere of TikTokers with Aryovaldo. This was halted days in advance, as, on 20 April, MINTTICS announced the suspension of Vida TV, Zap Viva and RecordTV África for "legal inconformities", prompting their closure as of midnight on 21 April. On 18 June, DStv would remove the suspended channel. Tchizé expressed her sadness at the decision and announced the definitive closure of the channel effective 31 July. Over 300 staff were made redundant. She subsequently announced the creation of a new channel for Portugal.

As of March 2023, the Fidel Castro Avenue studios were being used by a new channel which absorbed most of its former staff, but not Tchizé.
