= Curto Circuito =

- Also known as: CC, CC All Stars
- Genre: Talk show
- Created by: Rui Unas and Pedro Miguel Paiva
- Country of origin: Portugal
- Original language: Portuguese
- No. of seasons: 17

Original release
- Network: CNL (1999-2001); SIC Radical (2001-)
- Release: September 15, 1999 – present

Curto Circuito, is a Portuguese talk show created in 1999 by Rui Unas and Pedro Miguel Paiva that airs on SIC Radical and SIC K.

== Presenters ==
	Name	Years
1	Rui Unas	1999-2002
2	Rita Mendes	1999-2000, 2002
3	Fernando Alvim	1999-2002
4	Patrícia Bull	2001
5	Irina Furtado	2001-2002
6	Teresa Tavares	2001-2003
7	Diogo Beja	2002-2003
8	Sylvie Dias	2002-2004
9	Carla Salgueiro	2003
10	Bruno Nogueira	2003-2005
11	Pedro Ribeiro	2003-2005
12	Rita Andrade	2004-2008
13	Solange F.	2004-2008
14	Joana Dias	2006-2008
15	Pedro Miranda	2004-2005
16	Sílvia Mendes	2006-2008
17	João Manzarra	2007-2009
18	Joana Azevedo	2008-2009
19	Diogo Valsassina	2008-2011
20	Rui M. Pêgo	2008-2011
21	Diana Bouça-Nova	2009-2011
22	Carolina Torres	2010–Present
23	Rui Porto Nunes	2010-2011
24	Maria Botelho-Moniz	2011–Present
25	João Arroja	2011-2012
26	João Paulo Sousa	2011–Present
