= TVCabo =

TVCabo may mean

- generally TV via broadband cable
- the former name of ZON Multimédia in Portugal
- TVCabo (Visabeira) the cable TV provider in Angola and Mozambique, owned by Visabeira
