= Jornal de Letras, Artes e Ideias =

Portuguese biweekly newspaper

- Type: Biweekly newspaper
- Publisher: Trust in News (TIN)
- Founded: 1 March 1981; 44 years ago
- Language: Portuguese
- Headquarters: Laveiras, Paco de Arcos
- Country: Portugal
- Website: Jornal de Letras

Jornal de Letras, Artes e Ideias, also known simply as Jornal de Letras (JL), is a Portuguese biweekly national newspaper published in Laveiras, Paco de Arcos, Portugal.

== History and profile ==
JL was first published in March 1981. The paper is published on a biweekly basis and was owned by Impresa until 2018. It provides literary and cultural news. In 2018 Portuguese company Trust in News (TIN) acquired the paper.

The circulation of JL was 27,000 copies in August 1981 and 25,550 in June 1982. It fell to 15,290 copies in June 1986.
