= RBTI =

RBTI may refer to:

- Ralph Breaks the Internet, a 2018 American animated comedy film
- Rede Brasileira de Televisão Internacional, an international Brazilian television network.
