= Exame (Portuguese magazine) =

Business magazine published in Portugal

- Categories: Business magazine
- Founded: 1989; 36 years ago
- Company: Trust in News (TIN)
- Country: Portugal
- Based in: Paço de Arcos
- Language: Portuguese
- Website: https://visao.sapo.pt/exame/

Exame is a Portuguese business magazine published in Paço de Arcos, Portugal, since 1989.

== History and profile ==
Exame was established in 1989, being the first business magazine in Portugal. The magazine was jointly started by Impresa and Abril Morumbi, a Brazilian company. It was part of Impresa and was published by Edipresse S.A., a Swiss company. In 2018 Portuguese company Trust in News (TIN) acquired the magazine.

The headquarters of Exame is in Paço de Arcos. The magazine provides business- and finance-related news. The thirtieth anniversary of the magazine was celebrated with its July edition published in July 2019.

Exame had a circulation of 26,000 copies both in 2006 and in 2007. The circulation of the magazine was 22,440 copies in 2010 and 20,652 copies in 2011. Its 2012 circulation was 17,586 copies.

== See also ==
- List of magazines in Portugal
