= Canal de Notícias de Lisboa =

Portuguese basic cable and satellite television news channel

- Country: Portugal
- Broadcast area: Portugal
- Headquarters: Lisbon

Programming
- Picture format: 4:3 SDTV

Ownership
- Owner: Lisboa TV (1999-2000); Impresa (2000-2001)

History
- Launched: 15 September 1999
- Closed: 8 January 2001
- Replaced by: SIC Notícias
- Former names: CNL (15 September 1999 – 8 January 2001)

Canal de Notícias de Lisboa was the first Portuguese news channel, owned by Lisboa TV. It existed from 1999 to 2001 and was acquired by Sociedade Independente de Comunicação in 2000. Poor ratings and performance led to the shutdown and takeover of its channel capacity by SIC Notícias on 8 January 2001.

== History ==
The channel was presented to the public on 9 September 1999 by PT president Graça Bau. CNL started test broadcasts on 13 September 1999 on TV Cabo, displacing RTP1 to another frequency, as a sign of the cable company's aggressive promotional push. Regular broadcasts started two days later, at 7am on 15 September. It appeared on channel 1, which sparked protests from subscribers. It started with a budget of 1.2 million contos and a fixed staff of 120, most of which was unknown to the general public.

The average day started at 7am with the morning news service, followed by a two-hour program, Central Urbana, a lifestyle program. From 1-3 pm, the schedule featured general and business news. The afternoon was given to Curto Circuito, presented by Rui Unas and Rita Mendes. At 7 pm, a two-hour news service followed. The 10-11 pm slot was occupied by a different program each day of the week. Live programming on weekends started at 1pm; weekend night programming consisted of interview programs and a talk show. On 22 November, CNL content was included for subscribers of the NetCabo service.

SIC took over the control of 60% of Lisboa TV, parent company of CNL, on 27 March. In June, SIC announced its plans to replace CNL with SIC Notícias, initially set for September of that year. The new channel was subsequently delayed to 6 October (to coincide with SIC's eighth anniversary), causing CNL to cut the airtime of its newscasts (limiting itself to only two ten-minute bulletins a day) and filling the schedule with repeats. The channel shut down on 8 January 2001; SIC Notícias took over at 7 am that morning.
