= TV Marçal =

- Country: Angola
- Broadcast area: parts of Luanda
- Headquarters: Talatona, Luanda

Programming
- Language: Portuguese
- Picture format: Resolution: 1080i (HD); Aspect Ratio: 16:9

Ownership
- Owner: Medianova

History
- Launched: 29 July 1998; 28 years ago

TV Marçal is the first community TV station in Angola. The station started broadcasting in 1998 and is known for its promotion of kuduro. The station covers the Marçal (or Margal) neighborhood in Rangel, a municipality in Luanda, Angola's capital. It has been speculated that, as of 2016, the station operates on cable.

== History ==
Until the appearance of TV Zimbo in December 2008, TV Marçal was considered to be Angola's only independent television station. In the mid-late 2000s, the station was notorious for being a springboard for kudurists, and was usually the first channel where such musicians would air their music videos, granted that they paid US$2,000-5,000 for the station to make a video. Since the station was a community service network, it was seen as a voice for lower classes; although kuduro was an integral part of its schedule, it also (as of 2009) aired music videos catering other genres, as well as "socially-driven programs".

In 2009, it was invaded by the police, causing a forced closure of its operations. Since the court did not find a way to maintain its closure, it quickly resumed operations, after its staff and owner were absolved. In mid-September 2011, a scandal broke out on its program Quem é Quem (Who's Who) where singer Nagrelha was hit by bottles from an angry mob.

In May 2018, the station won the Palanca Negra Gigante prize for the best community television station.
