= Kanuca TV =

- Country: Angola
- Broadcast area: Angola; Mozambique; Cape Verde; Portugal; Brazil

Programming
- Language: Portuguese

Ownership
- Owner: Kanuca Media Group
- Key people: Adilson Francisco

History
- Launched: 11 August 2023

Kanuca TV is an Angolan television channel aimed at children, owned by Kanuca Media Group. The channel is available in several Portuguese-speaking countries via cable, satellite and internet operators. Programming largely consists of in-house productions, with a handful of acquisitions.

== History ==
Kanuca TV started broadcasting on 12 August 2023 on ZAP and TV Cabo (the latter through its ZAP packages) in Angola and Mozambique. The channel started with a strong promotion of Angolan culture through educational and religious means to create "the man of tomorrow", according to network officials. Although the channel already had a sizable amount of original productions, it planned to add four more of these by the end of the year.

The channel bagged its first award in Varanasi on 7 December 2023 for a short film of its original series As Aventuras da Princesa Mirabilis.

On 11 July 2024, its international expansion began by arriving to the MEO platform in Portugal. In late October 2024, Kanuca TV arrived to Brazil via the Soul TV streaming platform. In November, it was a launch channel on Digi Portugal.
