= TVCabo (Visabeira) =

TVCabo is the name of a telecommunications operator in Angola and Mozambique owned by Visabeira and founded in 1996. Services launched in 1998 in Mozambique and in 2006 in Angola. In the 2010s, it employed the VIV brand for its triple-play service.

== History ==
The company was founded in 1996 in Mozambique and had its services limited only to Maputo until the early 2010s. In 2001, the company started providing double-play (internet and television) services and started digital broadcasts in 2004. As of 2011, TV Cabo offered a basic package, as well as extra subscription packages; penetration of its cable network reached 30% of Maputo that year.

In Angola, it set up its network in 2002 and made its test run in October 2005. It launched its full service on 10 March 2006, at the time, it had over a thousand subscribers in the Luanda area. Unlike Mozambique, TVCabo's Angolan operations were entirely digital from the beginning. It planned to cover 64,000 households in 2006 and would reach the 100,000 household mark in 2007. Among the channels carried there at launch were RTP África, RTP Internacional, TPA 1, TPA 2, CNN International, Record Internacional, Reality TV, MGM, Cartoon Network and TV5Monde Afrique. It announced its plans to expand to Huíla in June 2012. In 2015, the company received a BEI payment to upgrade its broadband networks in Luanda, Benguela and Lobito, as well as the installation of fiber-optic networks in Lubango, Huambo, Cabinda and Soyo.

It started providing ZAP packages in both countries on 1 April 2011.
