= TPA Internacional =

- Country: Angola
- Broadcast area: Angola

Programming
- Language: Portuguese
- Picture format: 16:9 HDTV

Ownership
- Owner: Government of Angola
- Sister channels: TPA 1 TPA 2

History
- Launched: 28 July 2008; 18 years ago
- Closed: 18 July 2022; 4 years ago
- Replaced by: TPA Notícias

Links
- Website: www.tpa.ao

TPA Internacional (styled TPAi in 2021-2022, during the first few days of the 2022 TPA rebrand, TPA 3) was the international channel of Televisão Pública de Angola, created in 2008 to cater to the Angolan diaspora. The channel was initially outsourced to Westside Investments, by arrangement with Semba Comunicação, until 2017; from then until its closure, the channel was managed directly by TPA. It shut down in 2022, being replaced by TPA Notícias.

== History ==
The public revealing of the channel was scheduled for 24 July 2008, with a tentative launch date set for "late July, early August", according to Westside officials. After Portugal, Westside hoped to launch it in other European countries. ZON was the first company to negotiate with Westside to carry the new channel. The Portuguese production company Até ao Fim do Mundo made the graphic identity for the channel, after doing so for TPA 2, where it also produced some content. The channel started broadcasting on 28 July 2008 on the ZON cable platform in Portugal.

The channel covered its first major event on September 5, that year's parliamentary elections. The channel dedicated ten hours to the electoral proceedings in two blocks (6am to 1pm and 5pm to 8pm), as well as a special edition of TPA 2's Jornal Nacional.

In 2009, it broadcast the TPA 1 telenovela Minha Terra, Minha Mãe.

Following the election of João Lourenço and the "witch hunt" given to the companies owned by Isabel dos Santos and her family, TPA cancelled its contract with Westside Investments, which had been valid since 2008, for the management of the international channel. The initial plans were to proceed to an immediate closure of the channel, in order to resume "in the quickest lapse of time available", with a new director put up under TPA's directorate and influence.

Logo used from 30 May 2022 to early June 2022, before the name reverted to TPA Internacional

With the relocation of TPA to new premises and the start of high definition broadcasts, TPA announced that it would shut down TPA Internacional, replacing it with TPA Notícias. The channel was supposed to change to the new service by 15 July; eventually, the new channel took over TPA Internacional's slot on 18 July.
