= SIC Novelas =

Portuguese television channel

- Broadcast area: Portugal
- Headquarters: Paço de Arcos, Oeiras, Lisbon

Programming
- Language: Portuguese
- Picture format: 1080i HDTV

Ownership
- Owner: Impresa
- Sister channels: SIC; SIC Notícias; SIC Radical; SIC Mulher; SIC K SIC Caras; SIC Internacional; SIC Internacional África

History
- Launched: 14 March 2023; 2 years ago (FAST); 1 October 2024; 16 months ago (linear)

Links
- Website: sic.pt

SIC Novelas is a Portuguese subscription television channel airing telenovelas produced by SIC, as well as some Turkish productions. The channel started in March 2023 as a FAST channel and became a linear channel the following year.

== History ==
The channel started broadcasting on March 14, 2023 as Portugal's first FAST channel, inserted in SIC's own streaming service Opto, airing a handful of Portuguese titles from SIC's archives, namely Floribella, Laços de Sangue and Lua Vermelha. SIC Novelas was the first of a line of FAST channels that the company was launching for the platform.

In the summer of 2024, SIC was studying the creation of a fiction channel on cable, the decision was taken when TVI Ficção, its would-be competitor, was set to become the open-formatted V+ TVI. The channel was tentatively named SIC Ficção. It was later decided that, instead of creating a new channel from scratch, SIC Novelas had to be ported from Opto, with Aida Pinto as its director. The channel launched on October 1 on the NOS, MEO and Vodafone platforms. With the conversion to a linear channel, the Opto stream ended.

In November 18 2025 SIC Novelas is on Freebox.
