= TPA Notícias =

- Country: Angola
- Broadcast area: Angola

Programming
- Language: Portuguese
- Picture format: 16:9 HDTV

Ownership
- Owner: Government of Angola
- Sister channels: TPA 1 TPA 2

History
- Launched: 18 July 2022; 4 years ago
- Replaced: TPA Internacional

Links
- Website: www.tpa.ao

TPA Notícias is the news channel of Televisão Pública de Angola, created in 2022 to replace TPA Internacional. The channel airs news and current affairs programming.

== History ==
The idea for a TPA news channel was first mooted in November 2020, when TPA announced the creation of its first two theme channels, the other being TPA Educa, an educational channel.

TPA Notícias was announced in May 2022, when it relocated to new facilities. It was initially expected to be operational by 15 July, as a replacement to TPA Internacional; this also led to the plan to merge TPA 2 with Palanca TV to create a cultural and sports channel. Castings for future presenters were held in June. The channel started broadcasting on July 18.

Shortly after the results of the 2022 elections were made public, journalist Hamilton Cruz, who presented the midnight bulletin (Jornal da Meia-Noite), quit his job. He questioned TPA's administration and was concerned about how TPA was used as a tool of the ruling MPLA administration. The channel has been criticized at launch time by opposition publication Folha 8, which considers it to be an extension of its long-running collaboration with the ruling party.
