= O Programa da Maria =

- Genre: Sitcom; Sketch comedy
- Starring: Maria Rueff; Mina Andala; Sabri Caramunchande
- Country of origin: Portugal
- Original language: Portuguese
- No. of seasons: 1

Production
- Executive producer: Nuno Artur Silva
- Production location: Lisbon
- Production company: Produções Fictícias

Original release
- Network: SIC
- Release: April 4, 2001 – July 2001

O Programa da Maria was a Portuguese comedy show created by Maria Rueff. The series came after the success of her appearances on HermanSIC, which started the year prior. The series centers on the life of Zé Manel Taxista (one of Maria Rueff's main characters), his Angolan wife and his apartment, while a subplot involves the rating wars between Televisão Ideal da Comunidade (TIC, parody of SIC) and Verdadeira Televisão Ideal (VTI, parody of TVI), as well as satiring the state of Portuguese media in general at the time. The series first aired on 7 May 2001 on SIC and lasted for fourteen episodes, and was later repeated on SIC Comédia until its closure.

== Production ==
After joining HermanSIC (created when Herman José moved to SIC in 2000), Maria Rueff decided to create her own show, criticizing the way Portuguese media, especially television, was managed in the early 2000s, and how media controls society. The first episode introduced the offices of the three networks (RTE, TIC and VTI) presented through female counterparts. Rueff believed that the series presented a common sense view of things, such as the logic of the ratings war.

Maria Rueff planned a second season, as the contract she signed with Emídio Rangel, however SIC's executives rejected the idea after declining ratings during the initial run, which caused the show to move to later hours. The decision was taken because the content of the series did not match up with SIC's prime time.

== Characters and segments ==
- Zé Manel Taxista (Maria Rueff): created in 1998 for Herman 98, the character is a pastiche of a taxi driver. Known for being "the most well-dressed and well coiffed man in the country", he is the world's largest S.L. Benfica fan and listens to all of its matches on the radio.
- Eusébio (Sabri Caramuchande): son of Zé Manel Taxista who, although named after the famous SLB footballer, claims to bean underground Sporting CP supporter. His peculiar bedroom is in black and white on the inside.
- Dona Rosette: self-proclaimed "Tele-Evangelist" accompanied by acolyte Carla Isabel, proclaiming themselves as TV Cabo's Witnesses. The two involve in conversion activities related to a television-based religion, thinking it to be the right path, and has a copy of A Sentinela das Audiências (The Ratings Watchtower), publication of the religious organization.
- Micaela Moura Guedes: parody of Manuela Moura Guedes, presenter of Jornal Total and, consequently, VTI's self-proclaimed general in the ratings war. She tries to increase the ratings of Big Bordel, the network's cash cow, and invites public personalities to the newscast she presents, only to constantly interrupt the interviews for further questions.
- DOT couple: they live in a storage room of the building at the beginning of the series and are later put up for adoption.
- Marco (Nuno Lopes): Winner of the first edition of Big Bordel on VTI, itself a caricature of the winner of the first season of Big Brother.
- O Que Nos Vai Na Mona (What's In Our Head): Inspired (according to Eduardo Cintra Torres) on a Woody Allen original, it tells the viewer what controls a person's acts.
