= Televisão África =

- Company type: Private
- Industry: Television
- Founded: 2021
- Headquarters: Praia, Cape Verde
- Key people: Saulo Montrond
- Owner: Televisão África, S.A.
- Website: tva.cv

Televisão África (TVA) is a Cape Verdean privately owned television channel owned by Televisão África, S.A. this CEO is Saulo Montrond, registered in February 2021.

== History ==
TVA started broadcasting on the digital terrestrial television platform in October 2021. In its launch year, it did not achieve all of its legal duties as noted by regulator ARC, namely the owners, administrative organs, staff responsible for its website and directors of programming. It did not air regular news services and did not have credits, meaning that its news staff in its initial phase was not properly identified. International distribution of the channel began on 27 June 2022 on the MEO platform in Portugal and was already negotiating its entry in other African countries, such as Nigeria.

On 9 February 2024, TVA launched on ZAP, first in Angola and later in Mozambique, and announced a €500,000 internationalization plan, which involved reaching out to the remaining Lusophone African countries and the opening of an overseas office in Lisbon.

== Programming ==
TVA in 2022 already announced its intent to produce Cape Verde's first fully-local television series, Lua Minguante, filmed in Cape Verde, Portugal and the United States. On 1 October 2022, it aired the eleventh edition of the Cape Verde Music Awards, which were shown on delay on RTP África. In those weeks, it also aired Cape Verde's first talent show, Talentu +, whose first live show was on 9 October 2022.

On 24 August 2024, TVA announced the release of Sodade, its first feature-length film, featuring Cape Verdean and US-based actors.
