= Lime kilns, Oeiras, Portugal =

Lime kilns in Portugal

Coordinates: 38.69442°N 9.2932°W

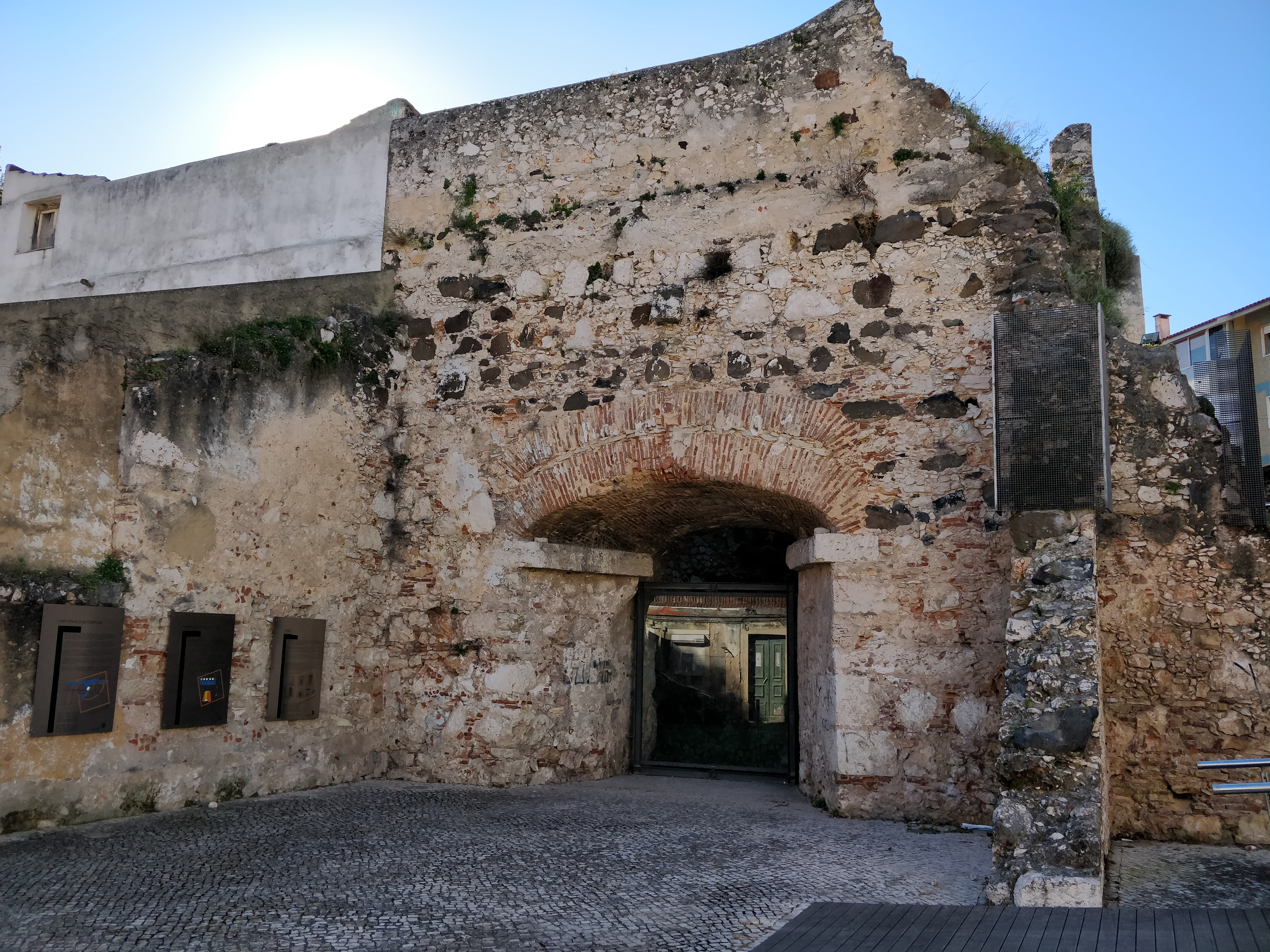
Front of Oeiras lime kiln

Five circular lime kilns (Portuguese: Fornos da Cal) made of stone, dating back to the late Middle Ages, were located in Paço de Arcos, Oeiras, Portugal. Four kilns were demolished or incorporated into surrounding buildings and their gardens, but one was purchased by the municipality in 1989. Archaeological work began in 1994 and the kiln was opened to the public in September 2004. The kilns are classified by the Portuguese Government as a Property of Public Interest.

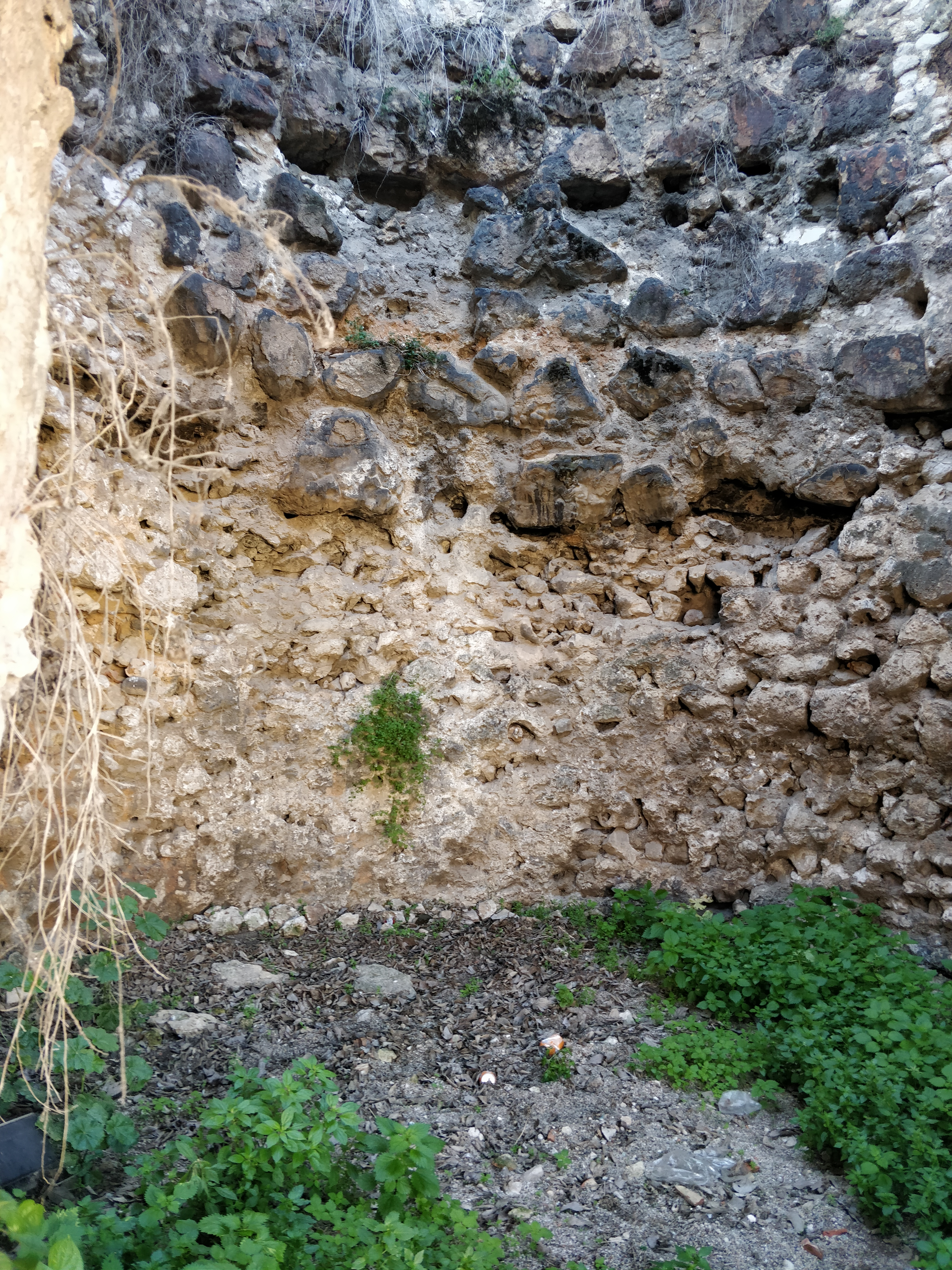
Interior of the kiln

== History ==
There are doubts as to the exact time of origin of the five lime kilns in Paço de Arcos. The earliest known reference to limestone burning dates from 1582, but the construction of the surviving kilns may have been later. In the 1700s, the kilns were identified in maps of the area. They provided a major economic activity in the area and played an important role in supplying lime for construction of the many forts along the River Tagus protecting Lisbon. The 1582 reference related to a builder involved with the reinforcement of the nearby Fort of São Julião da Barra hiring masons to make lime in the kilns. Use of the kilns is believed to have ceased in the middle of the 19th century. For a time they were then used as stores by nearby fishermen.

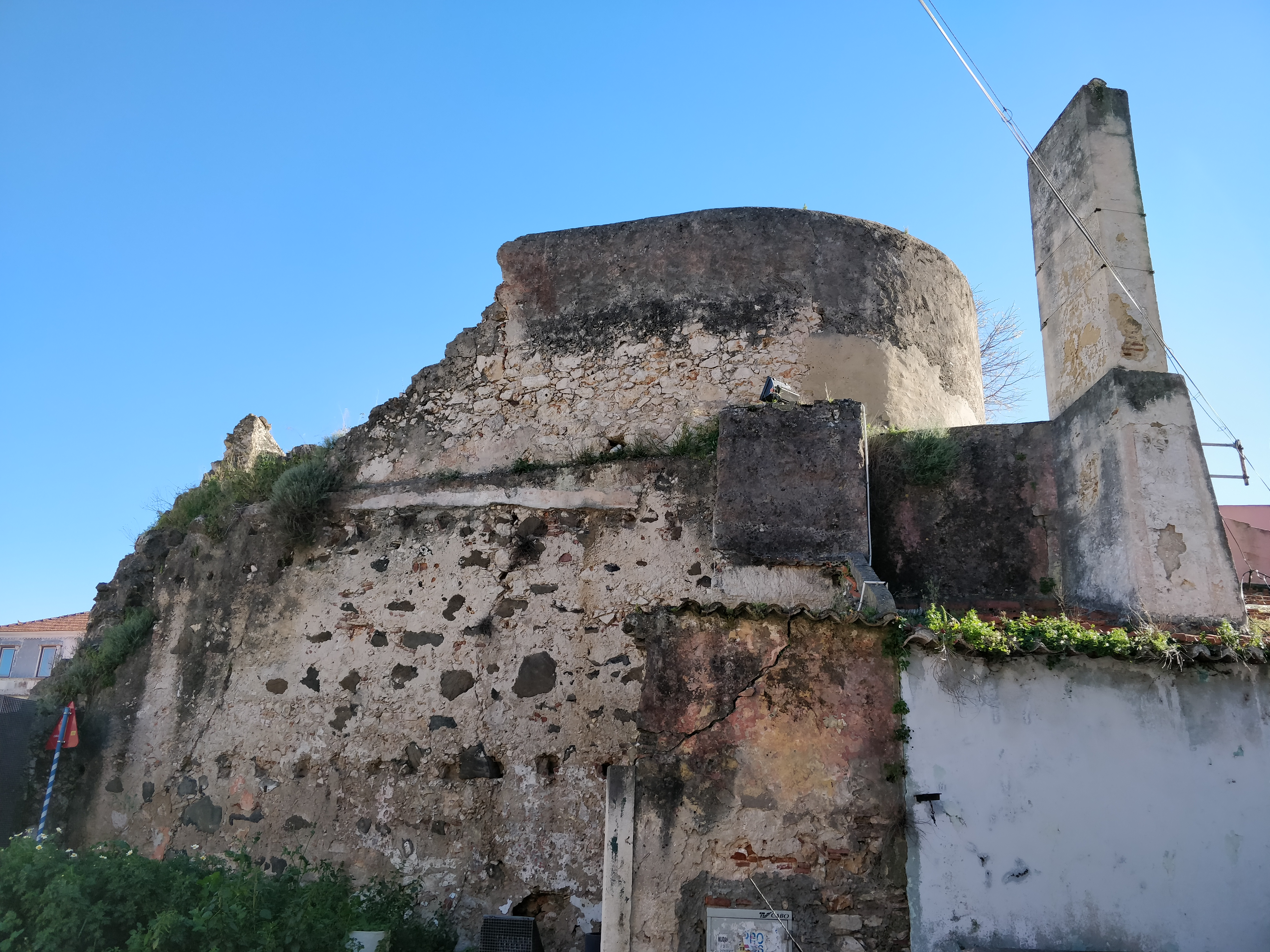
Side view of the kiln

== Description of the kilns ==
The five circular kilns, or ovens, had a diameter of 7-8 metres at their base. They were interconnected in order to optimize the material and human resources involved in the process. They were single-chamber, boiler-type ovens with very thick walls (3 metres at the base), necessary for the conversion process that required extremely high temperatures over a long period. Each kiln had one door and an inner chamber inside a conical dome.
