= Vista Alegre (company) =

Portuguese porcelain manufacturer

- Company type: Private company, part of a plc
- Industry: Porcelain
- Founded: 1824
- Headquarters: Ílhavo, Portugal
- Website: www.myvistaalegre.com

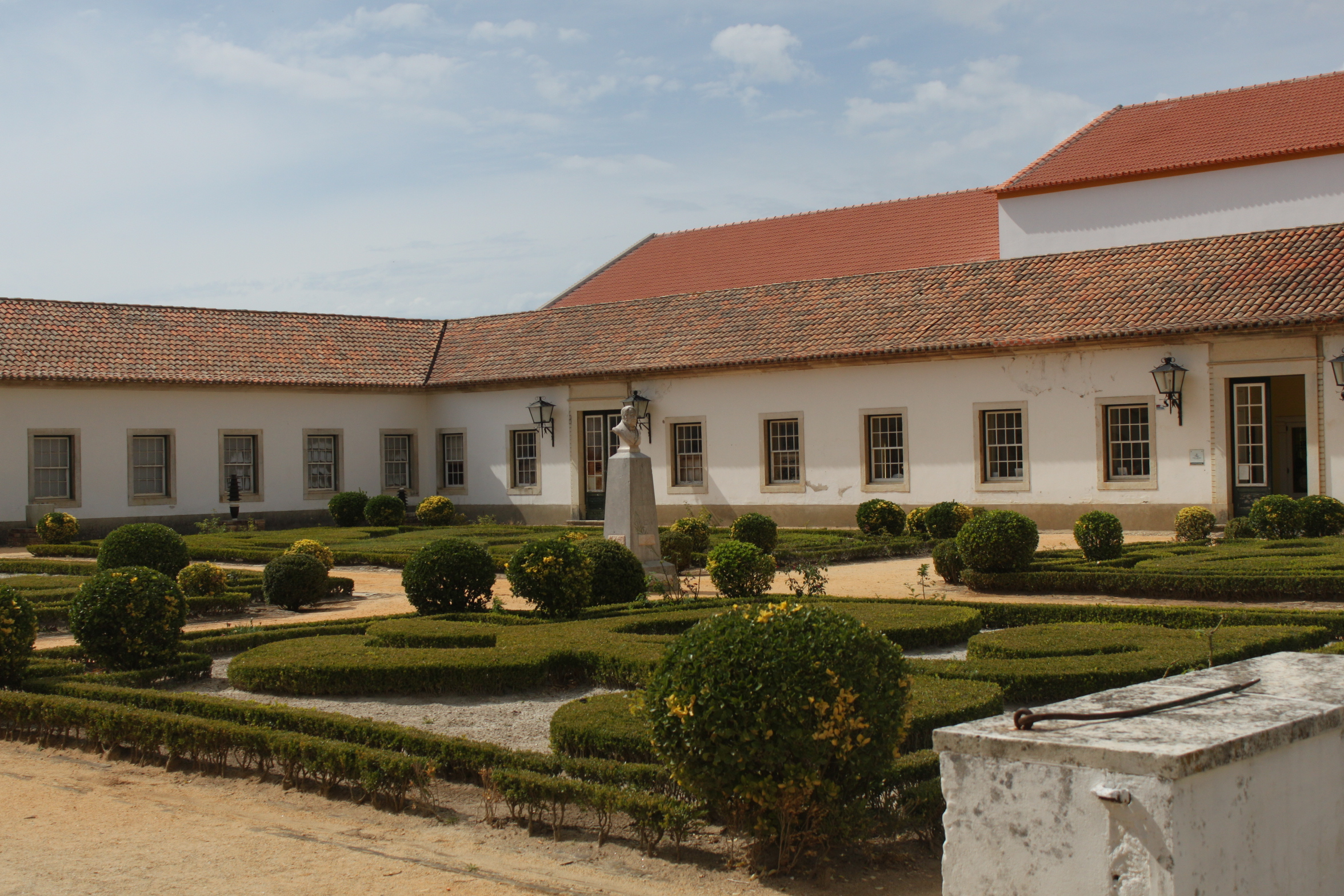
The Vista Alegre manufacture in Ílhavo

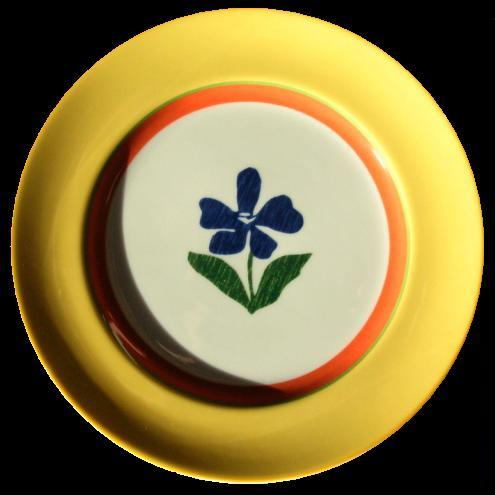
Vista Alegre plate, made in Brazil

Vista Alegre is a luxury Portuguese porcelain manufacturer located in Ílhavo in the district of Aveiro, Portugal.

By May 2001, Grupo Vista Alegre joined with the Atlantis group and created the largest national tableware Group and the sixth in the world in this speciality: the Grupo Vista Alegre Atlantis. Fabrica de Porcelana Vista Alegre, with its historical background and tradition is the most representative industrial unit of the eleven ones of the Group, producing around 10 million pieces a year, in decorative and domestic porcelain. In 2002 it finished an industrial re-engineering process to increase both its capacity and production volume. An integration project was also under way for the two porcelain production centres of the Group, (FPVA and Chousa Nova).

== History ==
Influenced by the success of the Marinha Grande glass factory, Pinto Basto decided to create a “porcelain, glass and chemical processes” factory. He started, in 1815, by acquiring the mansion Quinta da Ermida, a beautiful place near Ílhavo town and by the Aveiro estuary, in a region rich in the essential manufacturing elements of porcelain and glass, such as fuels, clay, white and thin sands and crystallized pebbles. Later on he also bought the surrounding 100 acre (0.4 km^{2}) premises, where he launched his project. The patent authorising the operation of the Vista Alegre Factory was granted in 1824 by King D. João VI, benefiting of “all graces, privileges and exceptions enjoyed, or to be enjoyed in the future, by the National Factories”. The, just five years later, Vista Alegre was granted the title of Royal Factory, to honor its art and industrial success.

From 1832 on, the Factory intensified its work and concentrated on perfecting porcelain, reaching a golden period that culminated late in the 19th century. The contribution from foreign artists such as Victor C. Rousseau was important, mainly for the creation of a painting school. There were very relevant facts during this period of Vista Alegre's history such as the development of a social work; the introduction of golden decorations, landscape motifs and delicate flowers; the involvement in contests (Paris, Palácio de Cristal in Porto) and, finally, in 1880, the end of glass production.

During the following years and until the end of World War I, the brilliant previous period tarnished by social unrest led the firm to harsh difficulties. Nevertheless, the spirit bred by the founder as well as the support of the drawing and painting school by artist Duarte José de Magalhães boosted the reorganization and modernization of the firm. And so, Vista Alegre, while celebrating its first centennial, began restructuring itself that was a landmark in the company as it became an incorporated firm, updated the Factory's structures, inaugurated two stores and boosted the design workshops. As of 1947 and until 1968, the international contacts, the formation of specialized technical teams, the purchase of both Empresa Electro-Cerâmica (its main competitor so far) and Sociedade de Porcelanas, sent Vista Alegre on the technological development and industrial path, as well as opening new markets.

By the 1970s, Fábrica de Porcelana de Vista Alegre took important measures to update its technological segment and enhanced the formation of new young painters. By 1983 it created the Artistical Orientation Board, GOA in Portuguese, as for Gabinete de Orientação Artística, and in 1985, the CADE - Centro de Arte e Desenvolvimento da Empresa, to encourage creativity and to contribute to the formation in the design, painting and sculpting areas, support the Factory technically and artistically by promoting its development. The company was bought by Visabeira in 2009.
