= My Channel Africa =

- Country: Angola
- Broadcast area: Angola; Mozambique; South Africa

Ownership
- Owner: Rede Record de Televisão (Angola), Lda. (Moysés Macedo)

History
- Launched: 2005
- Former names: TV Record Angola (2005-2016); RecordTV Africa (2016-2021)

Links
- Website: mychannelafrica.com

My Channel Africa is an Angolan pay television channel, owned by Grupo Record. It is available via satellite, through the operator DStv (channel 515, in HD and SD definitions), and on cable television, through the operator TV Cabo (channel 13), for some provinces of Angola and Mozambique. It has a programming consisting of entertainment, showing series, soap operas and other programs from Record, and excludes news and UCKG programming.

== History ==
The channel opened in 2005 as TV Record Angola. Initially, there was no programming produced in Angola, serving only as a Record Internacional signal for the country.

In 2008, the program Mangolé de Sucesso premiered, presented by Angélica Costa, the broadcaster's first production in Angola. On April 23, 2009, the channel opened its new headquarters in Luanda.

On November 18, 2014, TV Record Angola began transmitting its signal entirely in high definition (HD) on DStv. On May 20, 2015, he launched the variety magazine Share Angola, based on Record Europa's Share magazine. On November 24, 2016, with the network's rebranding, the station was renamed RecordTV Africa. With the change, there was also the premiere of Escola da Moda, with the presentation of journalist Mell Chaves and fashion producer Hadjamar El Vaim, also shown on TPA 2, a secondary channel of public broadcaster TPA.

On May 8, 2018, the channel premiered JR África, a news program led by Simeão Mundula, and on March 18, 2019, the program Tudo a Ver (based on the Brazilian program of the same name) premiered, with the presentation of Juddy da Conceição and Rosa de Sousa. In November 2020, it was announced that Juddy had left the network.

On April 19, 2021, it was announced by the Secretary of State for Social Communication of Angola (MINTTICS), Nuno Carnaval, during a statement broadcast by TPA, that RecordTV Africa, as well as other newspapers, magazines, websites and radio stations, would have their activities suspended, with effect from the 21st of April, due to non-compliance with the legal requirements for carrying out journalistic activity in the country, such as the fact that the company does not have an Angolan in its executive management, in addition to having, in its staff, foreign journalists who are not accredited in the country. The secretary stated that suspended companies would not be able to resume their activities until the illegalities were corrected. The broadcaster expressed its opinion in a statement and stated that "it has always been guided by legality for more than 15 years in Angola and throughout the African continent, and will, together with the regulatory bodies, seek clarification regarding the alleged irregularities".

On April 20, RecordTV Africa released another official note, stating that it had filed an appeal against the Angolan government's decision, which would allow the broadcaster to continue on the air while the assessment took place. However, at midnight on the scheduled day, the broadcaster's programming was suspended, with no plans to return.

On April 30, the channel announced the replacement of executive director Fernando Teixeira by Simeão Mundula, and stated that it does not have any journalist of foreign nationality on its staff.

On July 16, the channel resumed operations under the name My Channel Africa, maintaining RecordTV's entertainment programming, but without producing local programs. Initially, it returned only on the same channel it was on DStv before interrupting its activities, and on August 3, it returned on channel 13 on TV Cabo.
