= TPA 1 =

TPA1
- Country: Angola
- Broadcast area: Angola

Programming
- Language: Portuguese
- Picture format: 16:9 HDTV

Ownership
- Owner: Government of Angola
- Sister channels: TPA 2 TPA 3 TPA Notícias

History
- Launched: 18 October 1975; 50 years ago

Links
- Website: www.tpa.ao

TPA1 is the main and generalist channel of Televisão Pública de Angola. Until 2008 it was the only state-owned terrestrial television channel in Angola following the period where TPA 2 was outsourced to Semba Comunicação and the arrival of private channels TV Zimbo and Palanca TV, both channels that later fell under the sphere of influence of the state.

== History ==
As RPA, it conducted its first terrestrial broadcasts on 18 October 1975, in Luanda, a few weeks short of Angola's independence. The station was only picked up by a handful of television sets in the capital. Less than a year after the official launch and the country's independence, the company was nationalized and changed its name to Televisão Popular de Angola on 25 June 1976, by the new MPLA government.

In 1979, TPA began studying expansion thanks to the efforts of the party's ideologies, starting in Benguela that same year, with relays in the cities of Benguela and Lobito, then in 1981 in Huambo. It was in Huambo that the first regional production center was established. The strategic expansion of the network corresponded to the provinces where UNITA had more presence and the civil war of the time had far more destructive power. TPA's reach was still rather limited, in 1988, the country only had 40,500 television sets.

TPA aired the Brazilian series Sítio do Picapau Amarelo in early 1979, but was dropped after just six episodes on air, under accusations that black characters were playing inferior roles. Later that same year, TPA aired its first Brazilian telenovela, Gabriela, two years after its premiere in Portugal. Before and after each episode, an announcer gave a Marxist interpretation of the topics seen. Jorge Amado, author of the book that gave way to the adaptation, opted to remain silent upon his visit to Angola in September that year by invitation of president Agostinho Neto.

By 1980, TPA was still broadcasting in black and white, at the time, it was airing O Bem-Amado, but without receiving royalties for the broadcast. The channel broadcast in a precarious manner, from 7pm to 11pm, with foreign (German, Japanese and American) equipment. Cameras were positioned erratically, French and Italian productions, subtitled, were predominant. TPA also attended the MIP fair in Cannes. Aside from telenovelas, from Globo it also acquired Carga Pesada and Plantão de Polícia, but rejected O Casarão and Malu Mulher, due to incompatibilities with the cultural norms of the time in Angola. Brazilian imports were converted by a British company due to different systems employed.

In 1982, TPA started producing programming in native languages, the first two being Malanje and N'Dalatando. Currently, the so-called "national mother tongues" have a special focus on news, of which there is a dedicated block on the main generalist channel.

Color television arrived in Angola in 1983.

Roque Santeiro aired on TPA in 1987 with a sponsorship agreement from Petrobrás worth US$250,000.

In 1992, TPA expanded to the entire country thanks to satellite connections. On December 13, 1994, TPA set up TVC (Televisão Comercial de Angola) to administer advertising slots.

In the wake of redemocratization efforts following the Bicesse Agreements of 1991, in September 1997, TPA became a public company and the official name changed to Televisão Pública de Angola, per Decree-Law nº 66/97 of September 5.

By the mid-2000s, 60% of TPA's programming was national. The soap opera Reviravolta, lasting 100 episodes, was recorded by a team consisting almost exclusively of Angolans. Brazilian teams sent their know-how to local professionals.

On 31 January 2007, TPA 1 began broadcasting 24 hours a day, a decision that was made for both channels.

TPA 1 made its first experimental high definition broadcast for the duration of UEFA Euro 2012, in which matches licensed to TPA were broadcast in HD exclusively on ZAP. HD broadcasts did not become regular until 21 June 2022, weeks after its relocation to the new facilities.
