= Rui Unas =

Portuguese presenter and actor (born 1974)

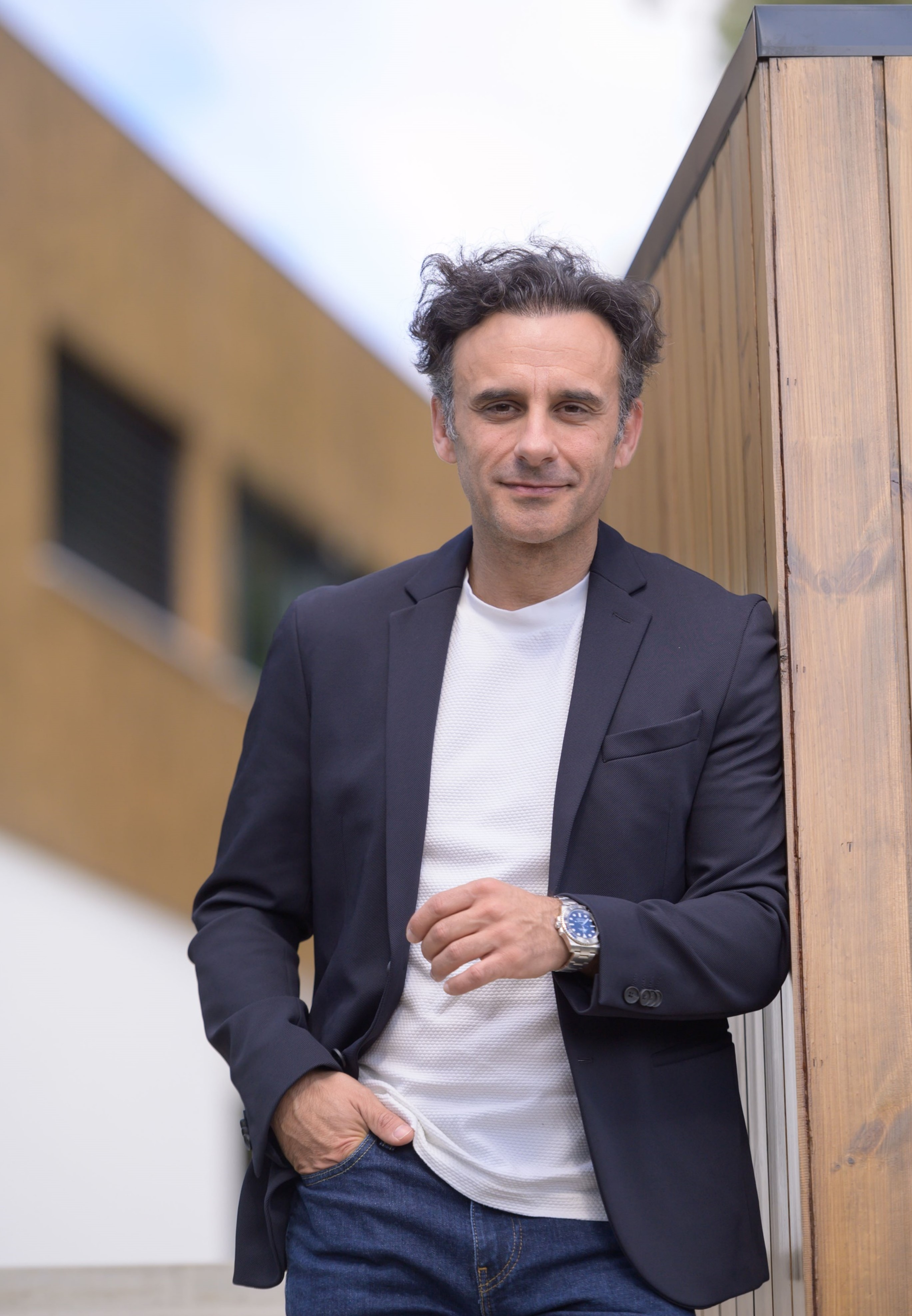
- Rui Unas in 2021
- Born: Rui Miguel Guerra Unas; February 23, 1974 (age 52); Almada, Portugal
- Occupations: Actor; TV presenter; Producer; YouTuber

Rui Miguel Guerra Unas (born 23 February 1974) is a Portuguese presenter, producer and actor.

== Career ==
With some experience in radio, he attended a presentation/speaking course at ETIC, where he was a student of Carlos Pinto Coelho, who invited him to join the team of the cultural program Acontece on RTP2.

He became known to the general public in 1996, when he began presenting the youth program Alta Voltagem on RTP. After a few years on the public channel, he took on the challenge of creating and presenting, together with Rita Mendes and later Fernando Alvim, the program Curto Circuito, which was part of the CNL grid, and later on SIC Radical.

Rui Unas has remained connected to SIC as a presenter for several years, while maintaining a career as an actor in films, series, short films and soap operas, including several dubbings for animated films.

Since 2015, he has produced and presented the podcast Maluco Beleza, available on YouTube, which features informal conversations with various Portuguese and Lusophone public figures. As of April 2024, the podcast's YouTube channel has over 500 thousand subscribers and 140 million total views.

== Personal life ==
He was born on 23 February 1974 in Almada, Setúbal and lives in the Margem Sul since.

Unas married Hanna Unas in 2003 and has two sons, André, born in 2006, and Rafael, born in 2010.

He supports Vitória Guimarães and frequently posts on social media about the club.

== Songs ==
- 2008
  - AC I
  - Sou o Mister U (betoLife) feat. SAMP
  - É o Kú – feat. Ivo, Kwanhama, Damani Van Dunem and Vanda
  - Funkú
  - Perfeita Imperfeição
  - Call AC II
  - Tcham morre – feat. Damani Van Dunem and SAMP
  - Bang out – feat. DH
  - VIP aka ICC – feat. Celso
  - Beef à Portuguesa com Rouxinol Faduncho
  - Dia-a-Dia – feat. Celso
  - Dama (Tu sabes) – feat. Ivo and Vanda
  - 10 anos (é bué!)
- 2009
  - Isto é CC! - feat. Curto Circuito show of SIC
  - Betinhos não se dão com comunistas
  - É o falsete
  - Caneta tem tinta
- 2010
  - Como Tu Me Mentes (Eu Sou PM) – feat. Cláudia Semedo
  - Margem Sul State of Mind – feat. Diana Piedade
  - Curte no meu Verão
  - Dá-me um chocho – feat. Celso
  - Bang Out
  - Mensagem de Natal do Presidente da Républica
- 2011
  - Hélio, o assunto é sério (o medo é uma cena que não me assiste)
  - Continente State of Mind – feat. Popota and Leopoldina
- 2012
  - Toda a gente é cristã quando joga a Seleção – feat. Senhora da missa show of TVI
- 2013
  - Bo Natal (ui ui)
  - Eu (não) quero sair – parody of Anselmo Ralph's "Não me toca"
