= Edições Novembro =

Newspaper publishing company in Angola

Edições Novembro E.P. (English: November publishing house) is the state-owned newspaper publishing company of Angola.

Edições Novembro publishes the one and only daily newspaper in Angola, Jornal de Angola and two weeklies, the Jornal dos Desportos (Sports) and Jornal de Economia.

The seat of the company is the capital city Luanda.

== See also ==
- Grupo Medianova privately owned media publisher
