= Jornal de Angola =

- Type: Daily newspaper
- Format: Broadsheet
- Owner: Edições Novembro
- Founded: 1975; 50 years ago
- Country: Angola
- Website: www.jornaldeangola.ao

Jornal de Angola is the only daily newspaper in Angola since the independence of the country in 1975.

The organization uses wire feeds from ANGOP, Agence France-Presse, Reuters, EFE, and Prensa Latina. The newspaper is published in Luanda by Edições Novembro. In addition to the printed newspaper, it has an online edition.
