= TV Girassol =

Angolan television channel

- Country: Angola
- Broadcast area: Angola
- Headquarters: Luanda

Programming
- Picture format: Resolution: 1080i (HD); Aspect Ratio: 16:9

Ownership
- Owner: Rede Girassol

History
- Launched: 19 November 2022; 3 years ago

TV Girassol is an Angolan television channel owned by Rede Girassol. It started broadcasting in 2022 in line with the establishment of the Rede Girassol media conglomerate and in time for the 2022 FIFA World Cup.

== History ==
TV Girassol started broadcasting on November 19, 2022, one day ahead of the start of the 2022 FIFA World Cup, initially only on ZAP, at 7:50pm. The channel was established by Brazilian editor and director Volmar Malgarin (who previously worked at SBT, TV Globo, Record and TV Cultura), who worked for João Lourenço's 2022 re-election campaign.

Following the success of the World Cup broadcasts, the channel acquired the rights to air Brasileirão Série A matches in January 2023, thanks to an agreement with LiveSports. The channel started broadcasting from its permanent facilities in Camama on August 25, 2023.

In June 2024, TV Girassol censored the interview to National Air Force brigadier Emmanuel (Nando) Russo, after the teaser for said interview contained remarks about the economical situation of Angola.

In early 2025, the network was accused of bad practices, a hostile working environment and nepotism. Some staff worked at least twelve hours a day without receiving financial compensation. Opposition publication Club K considers it to be the government's "white elephant".
