= SPT TV =

- Country: United States
- Broadcast area: National
- Headquarters: Newark, New Jersey

Programming
- Picture format: 480p SDTV

Ownership
- Owner: Seabra Portuguese Television

History
- Launched: 1986

Links
- Website: SPT TV Channel

SPT TV is a Portuguese language Television channel in the United States that is owned by Seabra Portuguese Television. Its origins trace back to TV Hora Portuguesa, which aired on the Linden-licensed WNJU, in the early 1970s. The channel launched in 1986 (1987 according to some sources), by initiative of Luso-American businessmen and is available via cable and satellite. It is the first Portuguese-language television channel based in the US and features the best programming from Portugal as well as local programming created especially for the Portuguese diaspora in the US. In January 2007, SPT TV launched SIC Notícias in North America, in partnership with SIC. It is currently available on Dish Network and certain cable companies.

At the end of 1998, the channel stil had an agreement with RTP, and delivered its programming to 130,000 viewers in 14 locations across New Jersey (planning to launch in 29 more locations in 1999), for an average amount of 11 hours of programming a day. The station was linked to the Seabra Group publication The Portuguese Post. In September 1999, it started carrying news from CBS Telenoticias.

SPT TV features programming from SIC, a private network in Portugal. Programming includes news, entertainment, talk-shows, comedies, reality shows, sports, among other genres. When it was RTP-USA, it also carried programming for the Brazilian diaspora, such as the newscast Canal Brazil News Network modelled after Globo's Jornal Nacional.

The official website ceased operation completely somewhere between January and March 2014 according to the available sources at the Wayback Machine on the Internet Archive, before launching a new website in 2021.

== Sport TV Americas ==
In August 2010, SPT TV partnered up with Portuguese Sports broadcaster Sport TV to launch Sport TV Americas, a North American version of the Portuguese sports service. The channel features exclusive coverage of Liga ZON Sagres with 5 live matches every weekend as well as coverage of the Portuguese second division, the League Cup and Portuguese Cup.

On June 5, 2013, for reasons exclusively imputable to RTP - USA Inc. dba SPT (Seabra Portuguese Television), SPORT TV Portugal S.A. was forced to restrain the access to the respective signal.
