= SIC Caras =

- Country: Portugal
- Broadcast area: Portugal; Angola; Mozambique

Programming
- Picture format: 16:9 (576i, SDTV)

Ownership
- Owner: Impresa
- Sister channels: SIC; SIC Notícias; SIC Mulher; SIC Radical; SIC K SIC Novelas; SIC Internacional; SIC Internacional África

History
- Launched: 6 December 2013; 11 years ago

Links
- Website: SIC Caras

SIC Caras is a Portuguese digital cable and satellite television channel owned by SIC. It features talk shows, biographies and documentaries and programming related to celebrities and royalty, reflecting Caras magazine content. Passadeira Vermelha (Red Carpet) is the primetime and flagship show, a SIC Caras original, while almost half of the programming is imported, ranging from celebrity-related documentaries to U.S. talk shows (Martha Stewart, Miss pageants, Victoria's Secret). In Portugal, initially the channel had an exclusivity contract with NOS.

In June 2014, it started broadcasting to ZAP in Angola and Mozambique.
