= Grupo Medianova =

Angolan media company

Grupo Medianova (English: Medianova group) is a privately owned media publisher in Angola. The group publishes printed newspapers and magazines, operates a TV station and a radio programme, with web presences of all published media. Medianova also owns its own distributing company to get their printed publications around.

It was founded in 2008. Its television station, TV Zimbo, was the first privately-owned television station in Angola.

Medianova's products include:

- O País (Angola) - newspaper
- Semanário Económico (Angola) O jornal da economia Angolana e do mundo
- Socijornal
- Revista Exame
- Rádio Mais (Angola)
- TV Zimbo

== See also ==
- Edições Novembro - the State owned (E.P.) media publisher (Jornal de Angola, Jornal de Economia, Jornal dos Desportes)
