= Rede Brasileira de Televisão Internacional =

International Brazilian television network

RBTI Network
- Country: Brazil
- Broadcast area: Canada; United States; Caribbean; Latin America; Europe; Middle East; Africa; Asia; Australia
- Headquarters: Toronto, Ontario, Canada

Programming
- Language: Brazilian Portuguese

Ownership
- Owner: Marcelo do Espirito Santo

History
- Launched: 28 April 2006

Links
- Website: rbti.tv.br

Rede Brasileira de Televisão Internacional (Portuguese: Brazilian Network of International Television), better known as RBTI, is an international Brazilian television network. It airs programming from SBT network in Brazil as well as original content aimed at the Brazilian diaspora in Canada and the United States.

== History ==
Rede Brasileira de Televisão Internacional, better known as RBTI, began its TV transmission on April 28, 2006 in São Paulo worldwide. The network is owned by Marcelo do Espirito Santo and the Espirito Santo family. RBTI is watched more 1 million people daily worldwide.

Since its launch in 2006, the RBTI channel has become one of the local Brazilian-Portuguese community television in North America, first of the international television channels to bring the World Cup in Portuguese to the community. RBTI's schedule includes American movies and series in Portuguese, soap operas, talk shows, news, women shows, music, community, sports, science and family entertainment.

It is also the first Brazilian channel in the United States and Canada to produce a daily community related show called Comunidade em Foco, interviews with Brazilians in the U.S. as well as a daily news segment, presented by Ana Maria, which keeps the community updated on the happenings of the Brazilian community thought the United States and Canada.

It is currently available only in Canada via Bell Fibe TV, Rogers Cable and NEXTV.

RBTI was available in the United States on Dish Network and cable in Miami, Boston and New York City. It was subsequently dropped by Dish Network on October 3, 2012.

== Slogans ==
- 2006 – A TV feita para você ("TV made for you")
- 2007 – Onde a estrela é você ("Where you are the star")
- 2008 – Orgulho de ser brasileiro ("Proud to be Brazilian")
