= Zap Novelas =

Portuguese-language television channel

ZAP Novelas
- Broadcast area: Angola; Mozambique; Portugal

Programming
- Language: Portuguese
- Picture format: 1080i HDTV (downscaled to 576i for the SD feed)

Ownership
- Owner: ZAP
- Sister channels: Zap Viva; Z Sports 1 Z Sports 2 Z Sports La Liga

History
- Launched: 1 August 2010

Links
- Website: www.zap.co.ao www.zap.co.mz

ZAP Novelas is an Angolan subscription television channel launched on 1 August 2010 by ZON Multimédia, owned by ZAP. It was initially produced in Portugal for broadcast in Angola, later in Mozambique, when ZAP launched there in the first half of 2011. The channel broadcasts 24 hours a day — initially 18 hours — and is aimed at a female audience. On March 2, 2020, in line with its tenth anniversary, the channel started broadcasting in high definition.

Its line-up is based on telenovelas and related products from Europe (especially Turkey), Latin America and the United States. With its line-up entirely dubbed in Portuguese — the vast majority of which done in Brazilian studios, — the channel also aired Lusophone productions, mainly from Brazil and Portugal. International productions are extremeply popular, with special emphasis to Mexican and Turkish series, since its founding the channel has aired telenovelas from Televisa, — with high viewer requests — in 2016, the channel started airing Turkish series, the first of which being Fatmagül'ün Suçu Ne?, becoming a success among local viewers and paving way for further Turkish productions airing on the channel. Until 2022, it was the third most popular channel in Angola, with surveys aiming at around 36%.

== History ==
The channel was initially produced in Portugal, in 2010 by ZON Multimédia for the Angolan market. Its initial goal was to compete with TV Globo Internacional, which at the time had a carriage agreement with DStv, from the early 2000s to 2015, when Globo defected DStv and joined ZAP. Portuguese regulator ERC approved the channel on May 27, 2010, which was initiated on March 5, 2010, for the creation of the channel for Angola, ZON's request to ERC happened after the creation of "a channel similar to services available in Portugal, but adapted for the Angolan viewing market". The channel initially broadcast 18 hours a day, expanding to a full-time 24-hour schedule in 2013.

== Programming ==
since both its founding and the start of its regular service, the content seen on Zap Novelas consists of telenovelas and drama series from several parts of the world. At the time of its approval, the channel had "contents of predominantly Portuguese, Brazilian, Mexican, Venezuelan and American origin", composed by telenovelas for 75% of the schedule (between 5 and 8 per day), talk-shows (1 to 3) and 25% series (between 5 and 10), as well as "programming content based on events or other specific topics".

The channel was negatively affected in the early months of the pandemic, with its line-up changing on March 23, 2020. Productions in dubbing phase were suspended, causing delays due to the situation. All productions are done in studios in Rio de Janeiro and São Paulo and following its paralization, new dubbed content returned in the middle of the year.
