= Z Sports =

Angolan network of sports channels

- Country: Angola
- Broadcast area: Angola; Mozambique

Programming
- Language: Portuguese
- Picture format: 16:9; HDTV

Ownership
- Owner: ZAP
- Sister channels: Zap Viva; Zap Novelas

History
- Launched: August 17, 2024; 21 months ago

Links
- Website: www.zap.co.ao

Z Sports is an Angolan sports network owned by ZAP. The channel started in 2024, effectively replacing pop-up channels used by the provider to carry La Liga and Ligue 1 matches. The channels (Z Sports 1, Z Sports 2 and Z Sports La Liga) are available in Angola and Mozambique.

== History ==
=== Background ===
In 2015, ZAP began broadcasting the ZAP La Liga channel with technical support from wTVision and Mediapro's subsidiary Medialuso, in both SD and HD formats. In case more than one match was played simultaneously, given the limitations of the channel, the second match was shown as a recording. On December 3, 2016, the channel aired a match with an Angolan commentator for the first time, the match between Real Madrid and FC Barcelona, commented by Celestino Gonçalves. Beginning in the 2020-21 season, the rights were extended to Mozambique.

In January 2022, ZAP acquired the rights to selected Ligue 1 matches, starting a second channel for this end, ZAP Ligue 1. Like what happened with ZAP La Liga, the channel was broadcast from wTVision's playout center in Lisbon, which also took its responsibilities in creating promos for the matches.

ZAP also had a channel for special events, ZAP Live, which closed on January 31, 2021.

=== Z Sports ===
On June 26, 2024, ZAP (UPSTAR Comunicações) requested the Portuguese regulator ERC the creation of Z Sports, subsequently approved on August 5. The channel continued using Mediapro's facilities.

The existing channels were replaced on August 13, 2024 with test signals from Z Sports, three full-time sports channels, whose broadcasts began on August 17. Z Sports 1 was initially dedicated to football and basketball in an initial phase, and planned to add more sports later on. Z Sports 2 was dedicated to the German and Italian leagues and cups. The existing ZAP La Liga channel was repositioned to match the new Z Sports brand, as Z Sports La Liga.

ZAP and FAMMA signed an agreement on March 22, 2025 for the two Z Sports channels to carry the 8th African MMA Championship, which was held in Angola in May 2025. The network launched in Mozambique on April 11, 2025. In May 2025, Z Sports gained the rights to all matches of the 2025 FIFA Club World Cup. In September 2025, it regained the rights to Girabola after five years. This implementation scheme was phased: until December 2025, Z Sports would only have its coverage limited to matches played in Luanda, and from January 2026, it would include matches played in other provinces. On May 15, it obtained the rights to all 104 matches of the 2026 FIFA World Cup for both countries.

== List of channels ==
Channel Name	Channel Number	Format	Packages
Z Sports	21	16:9 HDTV	ZAP Mini, ZAP Mais, ZAP Max, ZAP Premium
Z Sports 2	22	16:9 HDTV	ZAP Mais, ZAP Max, ZAP Premium
Z Sports LaLiga	23	16:9 HDTV	ZAP Max, ZAP Premium
