= The Portuguese Channel =

Cable TV channel in New England, United States

- Country: United States
- Broadcast area: Parts of the Boston and Providence DMAs, with emphasis on New Bedford and Fall River
- Headquarters: New Bedford

Programming
- Language: Portuguese
- Picture format: 1080i (SDTV)

Ownership
- Owner: Semba Studio LLC

History
- Launched: August 2, 1976 (49 years ago)

The Portuguese Channel is an American cable television channel that targets Portuguese immigrants and their descendants in New Bedford and Fall River, an area in southern New England with a large Portuguese immigrant population. The channel is available throughout much of the Providence and Boston designated market areas (DMAs) on both Cox and Xfinity cable systems.

== History ==
The Portuguese Channel was founded in 1976 by Colony Communications at the initiative of its president, Bruce Clark. The primary objective of the service was to increase cable television penetration in New Bedford, where approximately 60 percent of the population was of Portuguese descent and about 30 percent of Colony's subscribers belonged to this demographic group.

The service initially launched as a pilot on August 2, 1976, under the name Panorama de Portugal, by António A. Costa, who died in 2005. Before appearing on cable, he had a similar program on WTEV-TV, Passport to Portugal, the first variety program on American television in the Portuguese language. The program aired once a week on Colony's Channel 13, and its success led to the channel becoming a permanent service in 1978. In its early years, playout operations were conducted at Colony's facilities in New Bedford. By the late 1980s, the channel had become fully owned by The Portuguese Times, a local newspaper serving the Portuguese diaspora.

During this period, Colony's production team also created music videos featuring Portuguese artists, filmed on location in Portugal and lip-synced to recorded tracks, for broadcast on the channel.

Early plans included televising matches of the Luso American Soccer Association (LASA), an initiative realized under the leadership of Adelino Ferreira, who was then president of LASA and later became president of The Portuguese Times. During these broadcasts, Portuguese immigrants gathered at Café Portugal in Acushnet and other establishments connected to Colony's cable system.

In 1980, the channel received a CableACE Award for specialized programming.

The channel's audience grew significantly with the broadcast of telenovelas from TV Globo. Eduardo Lima, who had professional contacts at Globo, recommended A Escrava Isaura, making it one of the first Brazilian telenovelas to air in the United States. The Portuguese Channel has continued to broadcast titles from Globo's catalog despite the nationwide availability of TV Globo Internacional. Following the success of A Escrava Isaura, actors Lucélia Santos and Rubens de Falco visited New Bedford at the channel's invitation, and other Globo personalities later made appearances as well.

Another initiative introduced by Lima was the broadcast of Sunday Mass to serve viewers who were unable to attend church services in person due to health-related limitations.

In January 1983, the channel's ownership group announced plans to distribute its programming via satellite to Portugal and Portuguese communities in Europe.

By 1984, the channel was broadcasting nine hours per day. An American technical crew traveled to mainland Portugal and the Azores to film sporting events for later rebroadcast in the United States. In August 1986, approximately 5,000 subscribers protested the decision to air the Spanish International Network on the channel. Inland Cable added the Portuguese Channel to its lineup in September 1987. In May 1988, the channel participated in the first Encontro de Televisões de Língua Portuguesa.

On November 13, 1994, Manuel Bonifácio, a house painter from Somerville, began a hunger strike—restricting himself to juice and water—to advocate for the addition of a permanent local Portuguese-language channel. Time Warner Cable responded with a compromise, stating that it would add Portuguese programming to a public-access channel, while Bonifácio argued that smaller cable providers already offered free access to similar services.

In May 2016, The Portuguese Times sold the channel to Semba Studio LLC for US$350,000. The transaction was approved by Comcast, which had business ties to Semba Comunicação, an Angolan company associated with members of Angola's presidential family. Following the acquisition, the channel underwent a renovation process reportedly costing approximately US$300,000.

In March 2022, the Portuguese Channel expanded its coverage to 21 additional cities and towns in the Greater Boston area and was reassigned to channel 93 across all Comcast headends in the region.

== Programming ==
On weekdays, the channel broadcasts from 6:00 p.m. to 12:00 a.m., featuring a range of in-house productions. These include a daily news bulletin (Telejornal on weekdays), community-focused talk shows, and a locally produced program affiliated with the Universal Church of the Kingdom of God, which airs near the end of the weekday schedule. The channel also broadcasts telenovelas from TVI and TV Globo.

Religious programming includes two Mass broadcasts, airing on Sundays at 7:00 p.m. and on Wednesdays at 9:30 p.m. On weekends, the schedule places a greater emphasis on entertainment programming. Evening programs are rebroadcast overnight and during the following morning.

In 2018, Hora Quente, which had previously been produced in Angola and aired on TPA2 and TPA Internacional until the conclusion of Semba's contract with TPA in 2017, was revived on The Portuguese Channel. The program was produced by Semba Studio CEO Coréon Dú. A pilot episode aired in December 2017.
