= TPA 2 =

TPA2
- Country: Angola
- Broadcast area: Angola

Programming
- Language: Portuguese
- Picture format: 16:9 HDTV

Ownership
- Owner: Government of Angola
- Sister channels: TPA 1 TPA 3 TPA Notícias

History
- Launched: 15 August 2000; 26 years ago

Links
- Website: www.tpa.ao

TPA 2 is an Angolan over-the-air television channel owned by Televisão Pública de Angola. The channel was directly responsible for the playout and its programming until 2007 and since January 2018.

== History ==
=== Early years ===
TPA started broadcasting its second channel on 15 August 2000, limited to Luanda, and broadcasting in an experimental phase. Its programming was limited to repeats of programs seen on TPA 1, as well as a limited number of imported programming. In 2001, TPA announced a plan to expand the channel's coverage area to the entirety of Angola, continuing to relay some of TPA 1's programming, but enriching its offer with a wider array of original programming, to be achieved by the first trimester of 2002.

In 2004, the coverage area expanded to new provinces, among them Cabinda, Benguela, Huambo and Huíla.

=== Under Semba ===
TPA 2 was put under Semba's administration in 2007, with assistance from Portuguese production company Até ao Fim do Mundo, which would also assist in the creation of TPA Internacional that same year, with many of its original productions being seen on the new channel. Under Semba, TPA 2 was managed by Tchizé dos Santos, daughter of the president of the time, José Eduardo dos Santos. Much of the programming was produced by his brother Coréon Dú. During this period, it had a high amount of original programs: Eu na TV, a casting show, which in its first edition was won by Lukénya Gomes, who would also go on to host other programs on the channel, Tchilar, nightly talk show Hora Quente, Flash, Bounce and others. In 2012, TPA 2 broadcast Windeck, the first Angola telenovela to be exported overseas (excluding RTP África) and was even given an Emmy nomination. In 2014, it premiered Jikulumessu, another Semba telenovela.

At the beginning of May 2013, TPA 2, which had been on air 24/7 for years, was reduced by half (12 hours), following a determination announced by the executive producer and administrator of Semba Comunicações, José Paulino dos Santos (Coréon Dú).

In the statement, José Paulino attributed the reduction in airtime to an alleged non-compliance, on the part of the Ministry of Social Communication and the TPA, with the agreements signed in 2007 relating to payment for services provided, which caused great losses to his company which lives of its own revenue and does not own any of the three TPA channels (1, 2 and International), as they maintain them as state broadcasters.

Santos has denied numerous times the accusations made by the local press and MPLA and opposition politicians, of taking advantage of the TPA administration for his personal enrichment, at the expense of the public treasury, as he is the son of the President of the Republic.

The reduction of the TPA grid generated numerous criticisms. Journalist Makuta Nkondo condemned the silence of the Ministry of Social Communication and the Board of Directors of the TPA and considers the attitude of the son of the President of the Republic as revealing that the country has reached the “peak of jokes”. “Not even in the worst dictatorships in the world did this happen. Even the Ministry of Social Communication remained silent in the face of these facts because its members do not want to lose the place they occupy and their bread”, he said.

=== Loss of Semba control and return of TPA ===
Following the election of João Lourenço as president of Angola, the new government started a "witch hunt" against members of the dos Santos family.

Following the new government's very public decision to end the content production and brand consulting agreements between public station TPA with Coréon's company Semba Comunicação, they invoked several false and contractually inaccurate allegations. The main allegations were that the channels were returning to the "public ownership" when they were always publicly owned and only using Semba's services. Semba never owned any of the three TPA channels, and has had to clarify for many years its position as a service provider.

After public dismay of the new programming and cancellation of some favourite television shows in January 2018 the Angolan Government's new leadership tried to save face and approval ratings by throwing Coréon and his company under the bus. The company responded with a public statement clarifying its role and even how much it was earning for its content services in comparison to the publicly published yearly national television budget (Semba produced most of the entertainment and promotional content for two of the three TPA channels reportedly charging under fees approximating only one-fifth of the budget spent on the main TPA channel). To excuse their poor image quality and the embarrassment of being exposed the new government used all the national public media to announce that Semba had stolen the HD equipment previously used to make TPA's channel 2 and international channel programming, however many well known employees of the channel have all throughout the year posed and posted pictures boasting about exactly the same HD equipment having always been in TPA's studios and currently in use. To which the station and Ministry of Social Communication of the country then made a public statement with the excuse that the lack of image quality was due to a temporary technical difficulty that was soon to be resolved. They alleged using a series of news stories and social media fake news campaigns that companies allegedly linked to Coréon were receiving large sums of money to produce content for TPA, while for years there has been public knowledge of TPA's history of late or non-payments to Semba and many of its private sector vendors. There was even recent controversy involving the administration admitting that due to lower ratings they would need to rehire Semba's former talent/ employees due to significantly lowered ratings after all Semba-produced content was taken off the TPA airwaves. This was followed by some protests by TPA employees claiming the decision to publicly shame the company and associated talent and then rehire talent individually has put the station in the position where they are now paying very expensive reparations to get that talent back.

At 12am on 1 January 2018, TPA 2 introduced a new identity and programming, which was teased hours before on TPA 1's Telejornal.One of its former programs, Hora Quente, was moved to the United States where it moved to The Portuguese Channel. Most of the former programs were revived in Angola when Tchizé opened a new channel, Vida TV, in 2019, but it closed in 2021 per a MINTTICS order.

The channel converted to high definition with the opening of the new complex on 30 May 2022; at the time, it was speculated that the channel would become TPA Cultura e Desporto, while absorbing Palanca TV (nationalized two years earlier) in the process.
