= SIC K =

- Country: Portugal
- Broadcast area: Portugal
- Headquarters: Carnaxide (Oeiras)

Programming
- Picture format: 576i (16:9 SDTV); 1080i (HDTV)

Ownership
- Owner: Impresa
- Sister channels: SIC; SIC Notícias; SIC Radical; SIC Mulher; SIC Caras; SIC Novelas; SIC Internacional; SIC Internacional África

History
- Launched: 18 December 2009; 16 years ago

Links
- Website: sickapa.sapo.pt

SIC K is a Portuguese television channel aimed at children aged 7–14. Owned by Sociedade Independente de Comunicação (SIC), it was launched on 18 December 2009 on the MEO platform. The channel previously had an exclusivity contract with the provider for six months. It stopped being an MEO exclusive when it became available on Vodafone on 24 March 2016, Nowo on 19 December 2016 and NOS on 25 June 2019.

== History ==
In July 2009, SIC and PT entered an agreement to carry a dedicated SIC Kids channel exclusively on the operator starting in 2010. In November, it was announced that the channel's launch was pushed ahead to 18 December 2009, coinciding with the last day of school before the Christmas break, as well as being a time where audience and advertisers would increase. The name SIC K, instead of SIC Kids (name of the programming block on the main channel), was chosen because the letter "K" alone represented the then-current generation, in order to be properly identified by kids and also teens.

== Programming ==
=== Current programming ===
- 100% Wolf (100% Lobo)
- 3Below: Tales of Arcadia (3 Entre Nós: Contos de Arcadia)
- AI Football GGO
- All Hail King Julien (Viva o Rei Juliano!)
- A Máscara
- Ben 10 (2016)
- Gigablaster
- Floribella
- Foot 2 Rue (Futebol de Rua)
- Jurassic World Camp Cretaceous (Mundo Jurássico: Acampamento Cretáceo)
- Kung Fu Wa! (Meia do Kung Fu)
- Lego Friends
- Lego Ninjago
- Los protegidos (Os Protegidos)
- Lua Vermelha
- Once (O11ze)
- Pac-Man and the Ghostly Adventures (Pac-Man e as Aventuras Fantasmagóricas)
- Ruby and the Well (Ruby e o Poço Mágico)
- Supa Strikas
- Tara Duncan (2022)
- The Muscleteers (Os Muscleteers)
- Trollhunters: Tales of Arcadia (Caçadores de Trolls: Contos de Arcadia)
- Uma Aventura
- Underdogs United
- Wild Kratts (Os Manos Kratts)

=== Former programming ===
- 50/50 Heroes (Meios Heróis)
- Ben 10 (2005)
- Boy Girl Dog Cat Mouse Cheese (Miúdo Miúda Cão Gato Rato Queijo)
- El Chavo Animado (O Xavier)
- Counterfeit Cat (Gatastrófico)
- Horseland
- Lightning Point (As Surfistas do Outro Mundo)
- Marsupilami (2000)
- Mechamato
- Monica and Friends (Mónica e Amigos)
- Mr. Bean: The Animated Series (O Imparável Mr. Bean)
- Penny on M.A.R.S.
- Simona
- Sítio do Pica-Pau Amarelo
- The Daltons (Os Irmãos Dalton)
- The Smurfs (Os Smurfs)
