= Impresa =

Portuguese media company

Impresa Sociedade Gestora de Participações Sociais SA
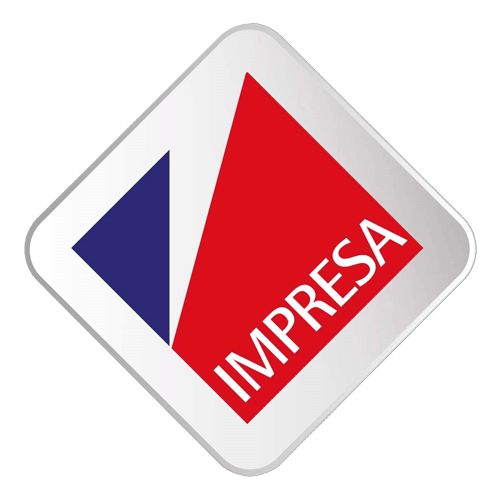
- Trade name: Grupo Impresa
- Type: Public
- Traded as: Euronext Lisbon: IPR
- Founded: 1972; 54 years ago
- Founder: Francisco Pinto Balsemão
- Headquarters: Oeiras, Portugal
- Products: TV stations, magazines, internet
- Website: Impresa

Impresa Sociedade Gestora de Participações Sociais SA (Euronext Lisbon: IPR ) is a Portuguese media conglomerate, headquartered in Paço de Arcos, in Oeiras municipality. It is the owner of SIC TV channel, and Expresso newspaper, among other leading media, like several magazine publications. A third online business segment was launched under the name Impresa Digital.

The company, which was founded by Francisco Pinto Balsemão, is listed on the Euronext Lisbon stock exchange.

== History ==
The origins of Impresa goes back to 1972. In 1991 the company established a holding company, the Balsemão group. The following year, it launched the first private television channel, SIC, in Portugal.

In 2011 the company established Media Rumo SA in Angola.

Negotiations emerged on September 26, 2025 that Italian group MediaForEurope was set to acquire shares in the group. With the announcement of the IPO, Impresa's stock prices doubled.

== Television ==
- SIC
- SIC Notícias
- SIC Mulher
- SIC Radical
- SIC K
- SIC Caras
- SIC Novelas
- SIC Internacional

== Publications (Impresa Publishing) ==
In 2018 Portuguese company Trust in News (TIN) acquired the magazines owned by Impresa, except Expresso and Blitz.

- Activa
- Arquitectura & Construção
- Caras
- Caras Decoração
- Casa Cláudia
- Courrier Internacional
- Exame
- Exame Informática
- FHM (ceased publication on 22 February 2010)
- Jornal de Letras
- Mística
- Telenovelas
- Visão

== Digital (Impresa Digital) ==
- Escape
- Info Portugal
- Aeiou
- Olhares
- Mygames (now a magazine)
