= Visabeira =

Visabeira is a Portugal-based international conglomerate with interests in telecommunications, construction, industry, tourism, real estate, and service industries. Headquartered in Viseu, Visabeira began its activity in 1980 within the telecommunications engineering sector.

== Visabeira Group ==
Visabeira Group (Grupo Visabeira) has five sub-holdings (Telecommunications and Construction, Industry, Tourism, Real Estate and Services), and is present in several countries and various disciplines.

=== Visabeira Telecommunications and Construction ===
Visabeira Telecommunications and Construction (Visabeira Telecomunicações e Construção) operates in the telecommunications network engineering sector. Visabeira Telecomunicações e Construção, SGPS, SA offers aservices in areas within the civil construction and public works sector, including architectural and engineering design, technical assistance, construction, recovery, and building maintenance.

=== Visabeira Industry ===
Visabeira Industry (Visabeira Indústria) offers products in kitchen furniture and stoneware, decorative stone extraction and processing, aggregates, ready-mixed concrete, PVC and polyethylene pipes, and electrical and telephonic cables. Visabeira Industry owns plants in Portugal, Mozambique, Angola and the United Arab Emirates. Since 2009, Visabeira is the owner of the Vista Alegre porcelain company.

=== Visabeira Tourism ===
Visabeira Tourism (Visabeira Turismo) offers four and five-star hotel units; tourist resorts; congress, golf, horse-riding, leisure, well-being and entertainment centres; as well as restaurants, multifunction rooms, ice-skating rinks, swimming pools, gyms, tennis and squash courts, Spa and Health Club, recreation sites, and a travel agency.

=== Visabeira Real Estate ===
Visabeira Real Estate (Visabeira Imobiliária) carries out projects for the high and medium-high real estate markets.

=== Visabeira Services ===
Visabeira Services (Visabeira Serviços) combines a wide range of specialised units in distinct sectors. In utilities, it operates in the areas of electricity, gas, roads, construction and infrastructure, as well as providing active maintenance, corporate multi-assistance, and household and asset management services. It operates in areas such as multisectorial and multinational trading, sales of material and equipment, management and consulting, as well as in the agricultural, forestry and environment sectors.

== Investment in Africa ==
Visabeira is 50% partner with the respective national telecom company in TVCabo (Angola) and TVCabo (Moçambique) providing broadcasting and internet access over broadband cable networks in Angola and Mozambique, two former Portuguese colonies. Thru its minority participation in the capital of Portugal Telecom, Visabeira is also active in other telecommunications activities.
