= SIC Mulher =

Portuguese basic cable and satellite television channel

- Country: Portugal
- Broadcast area: Portugal; Angola; Mozambique; Cape Verde
- Headquarters: Paço de Arcos, Oeiras

Programming
- Picture format: 576i (16:9 SDTV); 1080i (HDTV)

Ownership
- Owner: Impresa
- Sister channels: SIC; SIC Notícias; SIC Radical; SIC K SIC Caras; SIC Novelas; SIC Internacional; SIC Internacional África

History
- Launched: 8 March 2003; 22 years ago

Links
- Website: sicmulher.pt

SIC Mulher (lit. SIC Woman) is a Portuguese basic cable and satellite television channel owned by Sociedade Independente de Comunicação (SIC) and launched on March 8, 2003. The target audience of this general entertainment channel are women.

== History ==
The channel started broadcasting on March 8, 2003, International Women's Day. In June 2006, it was equated that SIC Mulher would shut down in December of the same year, due to the low ratings reached by the channel,which was ultimately not achieved.

In March 2023 - and regarding the commemoration of the 20th anniversary of SIC Mulher -, it was announced that in January this year the channel has achieved its best result (in terms of audience and/or rating) during the period of the preceding decade.

Beginning in October 2022, the channel started airing Turkish series with Latin American Spanish dubs - later followed by its sister channel SIC Caras -, becoming a successful product, displacing its airtime from international reality and talent shows. Portuguese content is seen overnight as of early 2025.
