= TV Zimbo =

Angolan television channel

- Country: Angola
- Broadcast area: Angola
- Headquarters: Talatona, Luanda

Programming
- Language: Portuguese
- Picture format: Resolution: 1080i (HD); Aspect Ratio: 16:9

Ownership
- Owner: Medianova

History
- Launched: 14 December 2008; 17 years ago

TV Zimbo is the first private TV station in Angola. TV Zimbo is owned by the private media publisher Medianova.

== History ==
It was launched on December 14, 2008, and was the first private television channel in Angola. Its launch received technical and editorial support from TVI, through the Portuguese group Media Capital, which was responsible for part of the graphics and the initial programming structure. On launch day, the channel aimed to provide "credible" news to "a growing number of Angolans". The creation of TV Zimbo took place amid the opening up of Angola’s media sector following the passage of the 2006 Press Law, and marked the beginning of competition with the dominance of Televisão Pública de Angola (TPA).

The inaugural broadcast, with the premiere of the main news program, then called Jornal da Noite (renamed Jornal da Zimbo in 2011), hosted by David Diogo (formerly of TPA) and Cláudia Constance (formerly of TVM). The initial programming included a variety of content, such as the Portuguese-Angolan comedy series Makamba Hotel, the soap operas Feitiço de Amor (produced in Portugal) and Dance Dance Dance (produced in Brazil), as well as programs like Hora da Lei (legal dispute resolution), Histórias Reais, Made in Angola (Angolan music), Cara a Cara (great interviews), Prolongamento (soccer debate) and Kids Club (for children). Medianova had just launched a weekly newspaper, O Pais, and a radio station, Radio Mais (first private broadcaster in Angola). The channel was launched in partnership with TVI and the BBC. 310 employees, including an editorial staff of 22, were hired. Medianova invested $26 million in the launch of TV Zimbo. The name Zimbo originated from the first local currency used in Angola and almost the entire West African coast, a conch the size of a coffee bean, which appeared all along the coast of Angola.

During its experimental stage, the channel was criticized for not being under the auspices of the then-new Press Law, which awaited a special law for the regulation of television signals in Angola.

On May 15, 2009, TV Zimbo joined the DStv satellite television platform, significantly expanding its reach and increasing its broadcast hours to approximately 18 hours. Later that year, landmark programs debuted, such as the Angolan version of the famous international game show Who Wants to Be a Millionaire?, hosted by Jorge Antunes; the afternoon talk show Zimbando, hosted by Armindo Laureano and Patrícia Pacheco (competing directly with Janela Aberta on TPA1 and Dia a Dia on TPA2); and the morning show Sexto Sentido, hosted by Dina Simão and Elsa Marques (also competing with TPA1’s Dez Doze).

In November 2010, the station faced significant financial difficulties linked to administrative issues and regulatory requirements. Following a financial crisis that also affected Medianova, 75% of TV Zimbo’s staff—mostly Portuguese expatriates—were laid off and replaced by local technicians. The situation led to an internal restructuring, accompanied by clarifications from the Ministry of Media, which indicated that the channel was not operating illegally.

In the context of this restructuring, the situation worsened further. The channel temporarily adopted the name ZTV between May and November 2011. Also at that time, for the first time in the channel’s history, it broke with tradition and changed the time slot of its main newscast from 8:30 p.m. (which had belonged to TPA) to 8:00 p.m. sharp, a change that led, months later in October 2011, to competition with TPA. Subsequently, it resumed the name TV Zimbo, accompanied by a new corporate identity, management changes, and a revamped programming schedule.

Starting in 2012, TV Zimbo consolidated its position in the Angolan media landscape, distinguishing itself through its coverage of national and international events, including the 2012 general elections and the London Olympics. In 2014, it began a process of technical modernization with the gradual introduction of HDTV technology (which was only officially launched in August 2019), resulting in the 2015 inauguration of new news studios and the renovation of the technical center, enabling improvements in production and broadcast quality.

During the presidential elections in August 2017, the Angolan Journalists' Union criticized TV Zimbo for favoring the MPLA's share of voice, giving 227 minutes to MPLA members, and 30 minutes to other parties between the 4th and the 14th of August 2017.

Starting in 2018, TV Zimbo became the audience leader in Angola, surpassing and overtaking TPA, which had dominated the television sector for forty years. This means that the channel has played an important role in the diversification of Angola’s television sector since its inception, contributing to the emergence of new professionals and television formats. It is also frequently associated with the modernization of Angolan television and the introduction of production practices inspired by international models.

In July 2020, the Angolan Attorney General arrested the Media Nova, for being created with funds from Government of Angola and which was formerly Angolan president José Eduardo dos Santos and generals "Kopelipa" and "Dino". As consequence of this, it temporarily passed into state tutelage indefinitely. The state announced in July 2021 that it would reprivatize the channel and all other Medianova outlets.

== Distribution ==
TV Zimbo is broadcast by private subscription satellite TV broadcasters ZAP and DStv as well as by private cable provider TV Cabo Angola.

=== TV Zimbo Internacional ===
The international feed of the channel launched on 5 September 2024, on NOS in Portugal. All of the programming is produced in Angola, but there's still the chance of a program produced in Lisbon catering Angolans in Portugal.

== See also ==
- Televisão Pública de Angola
