= SIC Radical =

Portuguese television channel

- Country: Portugal
- Broadcast area: Portugal

Programming
- Picture format: 576i (16:9 SDTV); 1080i (HDTV)

Ownership
- Owner: Impresa
- Sister channels: SIC; SIC Notícias; SIC Mulher; SIC K SIC Caras; SIC Novelas; SIC Internacional; SIC Internacional África

History
- Launched: 23 April 2001; 25 years ago

Links
- Website: SIC Radical

SIC Radical is a Portuguese basic cable and satellite television channel owned by Sociedade Independente de Comunicação.

SIC Radical is an entertainment channel, initially targeted at teens and young adults, but since the appointment of Pedro Boucherie Mendes as its director of programming in 2008, it started to cater more towards a predominantly male audience. SIC Radical programing has shifted through its history, Curto Circuito being its iconic TV show, being present along with sci-fi series, anime, britcoms, talk-shows, erotic programming and amateur television. Along with originals, it airs several television shows from the United States and the United Kingdom. SIC Radical also shows reruns of popular TV-shows and does live coverage of the most important music festivals in Portugal.

== History ==
On 6 January 2000, SIC announced an agreement with TV Cabo to carry three new channels: SIC Radical, SIC Gold and the control of CNL, the last of which was to be converted into SIC Notícias. The initial proposal for SIC Radical was to be a channel aimed at the youth, with the inclusion of programming aimed at children and teenagers, with cartoons and extreme sports. Henrique Balsemão, son of Francisco Pinto Balsemão and the producer of Portugal Radical, was set to have a key role. By June, Francisco Penim was appointed as its director.

The channel started broadcasting on 23 April 2001, aiming at teenagers and young adults (comprising the 15-34 demographic), as the first "politically incorrect" channel on cable. Launch programming included South Park, The Twilight Zone and Howard Stern's talk show, while national programming included Curto Circuito (which had been ejected from CNL due to its replacement by SIC Notícias, and was temporarily shown on TV Cabo's schedule channel), Templo dos Jogos and Portugal Radical. On 1 June 2001, Tal & Qual reported on a rumored Portuguese adaptation of Naked News after summer, while hypothesizing the selection of presenters and the inclusion of both men and women. Penim did not confirm its launch. Other programs included Sex and the City, already shown by the main channel, Japanese anime in the Banzai strand and syndicated Canadian shows from CHUM, such as Ed the Sock.

On 22 April 2002, the eve of the channel's first anniversary, the channel premiered Nutícias, the Portuguese counterpart of Naked News. The news summary was compiled by Victor Figueiredo, which was read by a female presenter. In 2001, the channel had an average share of 5.6%. Around June 2002, one of its popular programs, Cabaret da Coxa, was gaining cult status.

At 6:30am on 30 June 2008, the channel changed its identity; its first new production coinciding with the rebrand was Fogo Posto. The channel around this time was now led by Pedro Boucherie Mendes; during this period its programming gradually changed more towards reality shows. At the end of November 2010 it premiered the TBS Conan talk-show, after a quick round of negotiations.

As of its tenth anniversary in 2011, most of the stars who had their formative years with the channel have left. Over time, it was becoming more difficult to maintain its initial essence. Mendes compared the channel to the American Spike TV, as more "alternative" content moved to other linear and non-linear platforms. On 16 May 2011, the channel unveiled a new brand identity, with the premieres of The Colbert Report, Na Casa D'Este Senhor and a new version of Curto Circuito.

In May 2016, SIC Radical launched a Full HD channel to broadcast some Rock in Rio Lisboa shows.

In 2018, the channel premiered A Bola Maciça, a comedy series inspired by the tone of Portuguese television in the 1970s showing the news as seen by a monopolistic television station that controls all information. In January 2024, the channel premiered the British version of The Traitors.

== Programming ==
=== Portuguese TV shows ===
- Curto Circuito
- Gato Fedorento
- Very Typical
- Irritações
- Falta de Chá
- Cabaret da Coxa
- Vai Tudo Abaixo
- O Perfeito Anormal

=== TV series ===
- The Amazing Race
- Anthony Bourdain: No Reservations
- The Apprentice
- Bad Girls Club
- Balls of Steel
- Baywatch
- Bizarre Foods with Andrew Zimmern
- Boomtown
- Cathouse
- Cleopatra 2525
- Clone High (also on Biggs)
- Commercial Breakdown
- Criss Angel Mindfreak
- The Cult
- Dark Angel
- Doctor Who (now on Syfy)
- Dr. Katz, Professional Therapist
- The F Word
- Face Off
- Family Guy (also Fox and RTP2 and now on FX/Fox Comedy/Star Comedy)
- Física o Química (also on SIC K)
- Hell's Kitchen
- Home Movies
- How Not to Live Your Life
- The Jon Dore Television Show
- The King of Queens
- Life as We Know It
- Lexx
- MANswers
- Man v. Food
- Merlin (also on SIC K and Syfy)
- Monkey Dust
- Odyssey 5
- O Negócio
- Point Pleasant
- Pulling
- Seinfeld (formerly on TVI, also on SIC Comédia and now on Fox Comedy/Star Comedy)
- Sexcetera
- Shameless
- Sliders
- Son of the Beach (also on FX)
- South Park (also on MTV)
- The Golden Girls (formerly on RTP2)
- Testees
- Torchwood
- Unbeatable Banzuke
- Undercover Boss
- Undergrads (foremerly on RTP2 and also on Biggs)
- Winners & Losers

=== Anime ===
- Basilisk
- Bleach* (formerly on SIC K)
- Boruto: Naruto Next Generations* (now on Panda Kids)
- Burst Angel
- Chrono Crusade
- Cowboy Bebop
- Darker Than Black (also on SIC K)
- Desert Punk
- Death Note (formerly on Animax)
- Dragon Ball* (formerly on SIC, SIC Gold and also on SIC K)
- Dragon Ball Z* (formerly on SIC, SIC Gold and also on SIC K)
- Dragon Ball GT* (formerly on SIC, SIC Gold and also on SIC K)
- Dragon Ball Kai
- Dragon Ball Super* (formerly on SIC and also on SIC K, Biggs and Panda Kids)
- Vision of Escaflowne (also on Canal Panda)
- Excel Saga
- Fairy Tail* (formerly on SIC K)
- Fullmetal Alchemist
- Fullmetal Alchemist: Brotherhood (also on SIC K)
- Fullmetal Alchemist the Movie: Conqueror of Shamballa
- Gad Guard
- Golden Boy
- Ghost in the Shell
- Haikyū!!* (also on SIC K)
- Hellsing
- Kiddy Grade
- Last Exile
- Najica
- Naruto (also on SIC K, SIC and Animax)
- Naruto Shippuden*** (also on SIC K and Animax)
- Neon Genesis Evangelion (formerly on SIC)
- Noir
- One Piece** (previously on SIC and also on Panda Biggs/Biggs)
- Outlaw Star
- RahXephon
- Saint Seiya: The Lost Canvas
- Soul Taker
- Trigun
- Trinity Blood
- Urusei Yatsura (formerly on SIC)
- Wolverine
- Zaion

(*) Indicates anime marked as aired with Portuguese dubbing
(**) Indicates anime marked as aired with Portuguese dubbing and in the original Japanese audio with Portuguese subtitles
(***) Indicates anime marked as aired in the original Japanese audio with Portuguese subtitles and with Portuguese dubbing

=== Sports ===
- Bellator MMA
- Brasileirão
- Red Bull Air Race World Championship

=== Music festivals ===
- Rock in Rio Lisboa
- Super Bock Super Rock

=== Talk shows ===
former SIC Radical logo

- The Tonight Show Starring Jimmy Fallon
- The Late Show with Stephen Colbert
