= Palanca TV =

- Country: Angola
- Broadcast area: Angola
- Headquarters: Luanda

Programming
- Language: Portuguese
- Picture format: Resolution: 576i (SD); Aspect Ratio: 4:3

History
- Launched: 16 December 2015; 10 years ago
- Closed: 29 September 2022; 3 years ago

Palanca TV was an Angolan private TV station that began broadcasting on 15 December 2015. The channel was available for Angolan subscribers through South African satellite service provider DStv.

Initially a private television channel, the channel was integrated to the state's sphere of influence in 2020, alleging financial issues.

Palanca TV shut down on 30 September 2022. Its staff was transferred to TPA. The former building was still in use by Global FM, another media outlet that was taken by the state.

== See also ==
- TV Zimbo
