= Zap Viva =

Portuguese-language television channel

ZAP Viva
- Broadcast area: Angola; Mozambique; Portugal

Programming
- Language: Portuguese

Ownership
- Owner: ZAP
- Sister channels: Zap Novelas; Zap Filmes (defunct); Z Sports 1 Z Sports 2 Z Sports La Liga

History
- Launched: 24 December 2012

Links
- Website: www.zap.co.ao www.zap.co.mz

ZAP Viva is a pay television channel owned by ZAP, launched on December 24, 2012, broadcast 24 hours a day and its programming is based on entertainment productions such as soap operas, television series, variety shows, talent, reality and talk shows. The channel is broadcast in Angola and Mozambique, through the satellite television operator ZAP. Its HD broadcast began on October 1, 2017 at position 5 of ZAP. In Portugal, the channel arrived at satellite television operator NOS on May 11, 2019. It is available in the basic package.

At the 19th annual Eutelsat TV Awards (which distinguish excellence and innovation in the broadcasting of television content), the channel won the category "Best Entertainment/Fiction Channel". The winners were announced in Milan, Italy with the participation of more than 350 broadcast industry executives from around the world, where a ZAP delegation came to receive the prize.
