= SIC Internacional =

- Country: Portugal
- Broadcast area: Europe; North America; South America; Africa; Australia

Programming
- Picture format: 1080i HDTV (downscaled to 576i/480p for the SDTV feed)

Ownership
- Owner: Impresa
- Sister channels: SIC; SIC Notícias; SIC Radical; SIC Mulher; SIC K SIC Caras; SIC Novelas; SIC Internacional África

History
- Launched: 17 September 1997; 28 years ago

Links
- Website: SIC Internacional

SIC Internacional is SIC's international channel, which officially launched in September 1997 in France and expanded throughout the world. SIC Internacional is aimed at Portuguese viewers who live abroad and features programming from SIC and other channels. Programming includes news, entertainment, talk shows, and sports. It also features exclusive coverage of Portuguese Liga football matches.

SIC Internacional is aimed at Portuguese migrant communities and is available via cable and satellite in Angola, Mozambique, South Africa, France, Switzerland, Luxembourg, Brazil, United States, Canada, Australia, and New Zealand) via Luso Vision.

The channel started broadcasting to southern Africa in August 2000. On August 2, 2004, it began broadcasting to Brazil on the NET and Sky platforms. The two providers controversially replaced RTP Internacional.

In North America, SIC Internacional is available via local Portuguese television channels.

In Canada it is relayed via FPTV and in the United States via SPT TV. These relays run alongside local productions aimed at the communities in the respective countries.

SIC Internacional: Worldwide coverage Portugal SIC International SIC International Africa

== Angola ==
On June 5, 2017, SIC Internacional and SIC Notícias had their broadcasts suspended in Angola and Mozambique on the DStv platform after Zap shut the signals of the channels in March.
