= ZAP (satellite television) =

Digital satellite television provider

- Type: Public
- Industry: Telecommunication
- Founded: 2010
- Headquarters: Luanda, Angola
- Products: Direct broadcast satellite
- Parent: NOS
- Website: www.ZAP.co.ao www.ZAP.co.mz

ZAP is a digital satellite television provider mainly for Portuguese-speaking countries in sub-Saharan Africa, owned by Finstar. ZAP launched in Angola in 2010, providing a subscription based TV service covering the sub-Saharan countries to south of Angola. ZAP operates from the Eutelsat 36B satellite, placed over Africa at 36,0 degrees East, broadcasting in DVB-S2 in five K_{u} band transponders with MPEG-4 compression and Nagravision encryption.

ZAP provides an unprecedented number of Portuguese-language channels for a region where Portuguese-speaking African countries account for more than 40 million people.

In order to subscribe to ZAP's television service a subscriber can use either one of the two available decoders. The "HD+" decodes the encrypted signal, provides an electronic programming guide, high definition image and 5.1 stereo sound. The "HD+DVR" decoder provides the additional functionality of digital video recorder.

== History ==
On March 25, 2009, Zon acquired 100% of Teliz Holding B.V. Zon planned to use to enter the Angolan market. Teliz acquired 30% of Angolan company Finstar in the second quarter of the year, with limitations in accordance to Angolan laws. 70% of the new company was to be owned by Isabel dos Santos, responsible for its presidency. The Eutelsat W7 satellite, which was to be used by the provider, launched on November 24, 2004, and entered service in January 2010.

On February 15, 2010, the brand name (ZAP) was revealed to the public, as well as the slogan A minha TV and the brand identity, developed by Portuguese company Ivity. The trade launch in Luanda also revealed that it would operate a two-tiered package system, comprising ZAP Max (50 channels) and ZAP Premium (80 channels). Emphasis was given on Portuguese-language and high definition content. With its launch, ZAP was created to target the high- and middle-end markets, with the high-end being DStv's long-established market at the time. The contract with Eutelsat was formalized on March 2, which also enabled ZAP to use UPSTAR's teleports in Luanda and Vendas Novas. In May, it launched its first in-house channel, Zap Novelas. By August 2010, ZAP was already planning its entry in the Mozambican market.

In May 2012, the provided added Porto Canal, in a contract valid for three years.

ZAP announced the launch of its fiber service, ZAP Fibra, in March 2015. The service was being tested in the Talatona area and planned to increase its reach to the Luanda metro area during 2015. In June, it announced the arrival of Globo's channels, who, from July 1, would leave the DStv platform. At the time of the announcement, ZAP was available in one million Angolan households. In January 2016, the provider started sponsoring Girabola, the Angolan football league, becoming Girabola ZAP for sponsorship reasons.

On March 14, 2017, Isabel dos Santos suspended SIC Notícias and SIC Internacional from ZAP at her own will, after these channels were broadcasting reports critical of the Angolan regime. A tweet in June 2017 suggested that SIC Notícias alone was "too expensive" to maintain, accusing Francisco Pinto Balsemão of "commercial greed" and revealing the contractual costs of some news channels on ZAP: the SIC channels cost €1 million per year, while an annual contract for BBC World News cost €33,000 and Al-Jazeera, €66,000. The pressure over Isabel dos Santos and the witch hunt that started when João Lourenço became president of Angola in August 2017 did not affect ZAP's finances, with 2017 being a fiscally successful year for the company, as well as not being affected by the devaluing of the kwanza.

Mozambique's Gloom Channel launched in both markets in August 2018.

The company repositioned itself in the Mozambican market in September 2021, at a time when the country's analog terrestrial network was switched off, by lowering package prices, especially the ZAP Mini package. On June 21, 2022, the provider added three Mozambican radio stations, Rádio Índico, Super FM and Rádio Moçambique.

In February 2024, Cape Verdean channel Televisão África launched on the platform, with a formal event in Luanda.

== Channels ==
ZAP currently offers 150 channels, including several HDTV channels, featuring TV series, films, music, children's programmes, news, sports and documentaries. The subscribers may choose one of three tiered channel packages: "Mini" with 35 channels; "Max" with 80 channels; and "Premium" with 100 channels. Additionally ZAP provides several radio channels. ZAP Angola and ZAP Mozambique have new packages of Mais 60 channels and 5 different package to choose from Zap.

- (ZAP PREMIUM · + 120 CANAIS)
- (ZAP MAX · + 90 CANAIS)
- (ZAP MAIS · + 60 CANAIS)
- (ZAP MINI · + 45 CANAIS)
- (ZAP PLUS · + 11 CANAIS)

=== Zap Music ===
Channel Radio Name	Channel Radio Number
Zap Rock	180
Zap Blues	181
Zap Jazz	182
Zap Dance Clubbin	183
Zap Easy Listening	184
Zap Hip Hop	185
Zap Trance	186
Zap Reggae	187
Zap The Chill Lounge	188
Zap 80's	189
Zap 90's	190
Zap Pop	191
Zap Greatest Hits	192
Zap Classic Music	193
Zap Afro Beat	194

=== Zap Sports ===
Channel Name	Channel Number	Format
Z Sports 1	21	16:9 HDTV
Z Sports 2	22	16:9 HDTV
Z Sports LaLiga	23	16:9 HDTV

=== Zap Entertainment ===
Channel Name	Channel Number		Format	
Zap Viva	205	5	16:9 SDTV	16:9 HDTV
Zap Novelas	209	9	16:9 SDTV	16:9 HDTV
Zap Programaçao	299		16:9 SDTV	
