= SIC Notícias =

Portuguese basic cable and satellite television news channel

- Country: Portugal
- Broadcast area: Portugal; Angola; Mozambique; Cape Verde; Canada; United States
- Headquarters: Paço de Arcos, Oeiras

Programming
- Picture format: 576i (16:9 SDTV); 1080i (HDTV)

Ownership
- Owner: Impresa
- Sister channels: SIC; SIC Radical; SIC Mulher; SIC K SIC Caras; SIC Novelas; SIC Internacional; SIC Internacional África

History
- Launched: 15 September 1999; 26 years ago (as CNL); 8 January 2001; 25 years ago (relaunch as SIC Notícias)
- Replaced: Canal de Notícias de Lisboa
- Former names: CNL (15 September 1999 – 8 January 2001)

Links
- Website: https://sicnoticias.pt

SIC Notícias (Portuguese pronunciation: [ˈsik nuˈtisjɐʃ]) is the cable news channel of the Portuguese television network SIC (Sociedade Independente de Comunicação) and the second thematic channel of the station. It is available on basic cable and satellite. It replaced CNL (Canal de Notícias de Lisboa), a Lisbon region independent cable news channel owned by TV Cabo, on January 8, 2001. The channel was created as means to lure subscribers to TV Cabo, which needed a stronger Portuguese news channel after the CNL experiment failed. Since the end of 2003, SIC Notícias has also been available in Angola and Mozambique via satellite or cable.

The channel is especially developed for cable, and its programming is almost totally made up of information and news programs. In response to its success, the public television network RTP bought NTV, Northern Portugal's news channel, and transformed it into RTPN in 2004, directly competing with SIC Notícias.

Beside the rolling-news blocks, it also offers special editions and thematic programs on economy, health, interviews, show business, automobile industry, advertising and sports.

The channels' primetime news program, Jornal das Nove, airing from 9-10 p.m., is hosted by Mário Crespo. Other news programs are: Jornal das 10 (10-11 a.m.), Jornal das 2 (2-3 p.m.), Edição da Tarde (3-3:30 p.m. & 5-7 p.m.), Jornal das 7 (7-9 p.m.), Edição da Manhã (6-9:45 a.m.), Jornal de Meia-Noite (12-1 a.m.), Jornal do Meio-Dia (12-1 p.m.), Jornal da Noite (8-9 p.m.) and Jornal de Sintese (throughout the day). Sport news is updated at Jornal de Desporto (12:30 p.m., 4:30 p.m. and 6:30 p.m.). Viewers are invited to participate in the day's top story or current nationwide issues at the daily's morning and afternoon editions of Opinião Pública. SIC Notícias has prominent opinion programs such as Quadratura do Círculo, Expresso da Meia-Noite and Eixo do Mal. International affairs are explored in the program Sociedade das Nações, hosted by Martim Cabral and Nuno Rogeiro.

SIC Notícias was a joint venture between Sociedade Independente de Comunicação (60%) and TV Cabo (40%) until 2009. In February, 2009, SIC bought ZON's shares.

In the United States, SIC Notícias is available on Dish Network.

In March 2013, SIC Notícias officially launched in Canada on Bell Fibe TV.

On January 27, 2019, the channel and the entire SIC universe transferred to the São Francisco de Sales Building, after 750 days of waiting, leaving behind more than 26 years in the old Carnaxide building.

The channel also has a website and mobile application. The mobile app was developed in partnership with the Portuguese company Magycal, allows access to live informational content, video on demand, and personalized notifications, integrating multimedia distribution and customization features.

== International cooperation ==
SIC is a member of ENEX. The channel airs Repórteres do Mundo, a weekly compilation program featuring news items from its partner channels.
