= Paço de Arcos =

Town in Lisbon, Portugal

Coordinates: 38.695°N 9.294°W

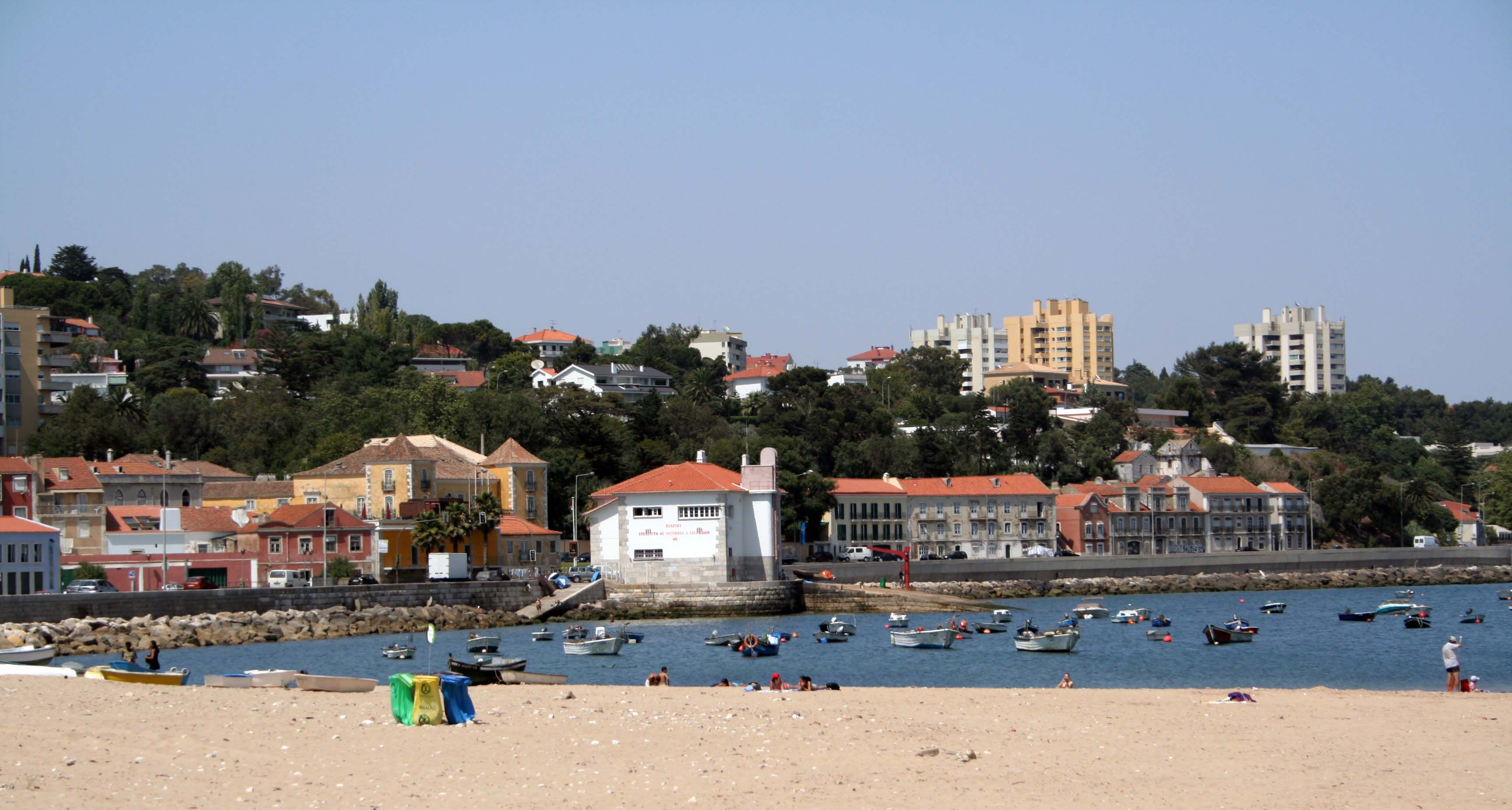
Paço de Arcos, Oeiras, Portugal

Quinta da Fonte - One of the biggest office parks in Europe

Paço de Arcos (European Portuguese pronunciation: [ˈpasu ð(i) ˈaɾkuʃ]) is a locality of Oeiras. In 2013, the parish of Paço de Arcos merged into the new parish Oeiras e São Julião da Barra, Paço de Arcos e Caxias. The population in 2011 was 15,315, in an area of 3.39 km^{2}. It was elevated to town by a decree on December 7, 1926.

Its name comes from the Palácio dos Arcos located at the entrance to the village, where king D. Manuel I of Portugal watched Vasco da Gama's caravels leave for India. Nowadays, the Portuguese maritime academy – Escola Náutica Infante D. Henrique – is based there. It's also the base of the private business jet company NetJets Europe.

Paço de Arcos is where Quinta da Fonte is located, one of the biggest office parks in Europe, being the home of companies such as DLL Group, Hewlett-Packard, among others.

The town is featured in Robert Wilson's 1999 novel A Small Death in Lisbon, as both the residence of the main character, Inspector José "Zé" Coelho, and where a body is found.

Items of interest in the locality include Lime kilns (Portuguese: Fornos de Cal) dating back to the Middle Ages.
