= Macau (disambiguation) =

Macau or Macao is a special administrative region of the People's Republic of China.

Macau or Macao may also refer to:

== Places ==
- Mação Municipality, in Portugal
- Macau (microregion), in Brazil
- Macau, Brazil, a port city
- Macau, Gironde, a commune in France
- Macău, a village in Aghireșu commune, Romania
- Macău, the Romanian name for Makó in Hungary
- Portuguese Macau, an historical colony of Portugal which is now the Macao special administrative region

== Arts and entertainment ==
- Macau (card game)
- Macao (card game)
- Macao (dice game)
- Macao (1942 film), a French drama film
- Macao (1952 film), an American adventure film noir
- Macao (novel), a spy novel

== Television and radio ==
- TDM (Macau) (Teledifusão de Macau), a Macanese radio and television broadcaster
  - TDM Ou Mun Macau
  - Canal Macau
- Lotus Macau
- Macau Asia Satellite Television
- Macau Satellite Television
- Macau Cable TV

== Other uses ==
- Macau Esporte Clube, a Brazilian football club
- Scarlet macaw (Ara macao), a parrot

== See also ==
- Macaw (disambiguation)
- Macou (disambiguation)
