= Anzal =

Anzal (Persian: انزل) may refer to the following places in Iran:

- Anzal, Kermanshah
- Anzal District, in West Azerbaijan Province
- Anzal-e Jonubi Rural District, in West Azerbaijan Province
- Anzal-e Shomali Rural District, in West Azerbaijan Province
