= Maku =

Maku (Máku, Makú), Magu or Makku may refer to:

== Places ==
=== Iran ===
- Dar-e Maku, a village in Hormozgan Province
- Maku, Chaldoran, Poldasht and Showt (electoral district), West Azarbaijan Province
- Maku County, West Azarbaijan Province
- Maku, Iran, a city in West Azarbaijan Province
- Maku Kandi, a village in West Azerbaijan Province

=== Other places ===
- Maku (Armenia), a region in ancient Armenia
- Maku, Ukhrul, a village in Manipur state, India

== Other uses ==
- Maku people, several peoples and languages of South America
- Magu (deity), also spelled Ma-ku, a goddess in China
- Maku, the name for the witchetty grub in the Pitjantjatjara language in central Australia
- Maku International Airport, West Azerbaijan Province, Iran
- Maku Khanate, a historical polity that existed from 1747 to 1922
- Maku River, a tributary of the Barak River, Manipur, India

== See also ==
- Macu (disambiguation)
- Maqu (disambiguation)
