= Jabal Kandi =

Jabal Kandi or Jabalkandi (Persian: جبل كندي) may refer to:

- Jabalkandi, Urmia
- Jabal Kandi, Anzal, Urmia County
