= Shirakan =

Shirakan (Persian: شيركان) may refer to:

- Shirakan, Anzal
- Shirakan, Silvaneh
