= Golanik =

Golanik (Persian: گلانيك), also known as Kalanik, may refer to:

- Golanik-e Olya
- Golanik-e Sofla
