= Kani Shurik =

Kani Shurik (Persian: كاني شوريك) may refer to:

- Kani Shurik, Anzal
- Kani Shurik, Sumay-ye Beradust
