= TDM =

TDM may refer to:

== Organizations ==
- TDM (Macau) (Teledifusão de Macau), a Macanese radio and television broadcaster
  - TDM Ou Mun Macau
- Tata Daewoo Mobility, a South Korean truck manufacturer
- Telecomunicações de Moçambique, a Mozambican telecommunications and Internet service provider
- Teresian Daughters of Mary, a Filipino Roman Catholic institute

== Entertainment ==
- TDM, a 2023 Indian Marathi comedy film
- Technical death metal, a subgenre of heavy metal music
- The Difference Machine, an album by English rock band Big Big Train

== Other uses ==
- The Yamaha TDM, a motorcycle model
- Target Disk Mode, a boot mode on certain Macintosh computers
- Team deathmatch, a mode of gameplay in video games
- Text data mining, a process of deriving high-quality information from text
- Therapeutic drug monitoring, a branch of clinical chemistry
- Time-division multiplexing, a method of transmitting and receiving independent signals over a common signal path
- Toad Data Modeler, a database design tool
- Transportation demand management, also traffic demand management or travel demand management
- DanTDM, British YouTube personality
