= Gavlan, Urmia =

Village in West Azerbaijan province, Iran

Gavlan Persian: گولان
- Village
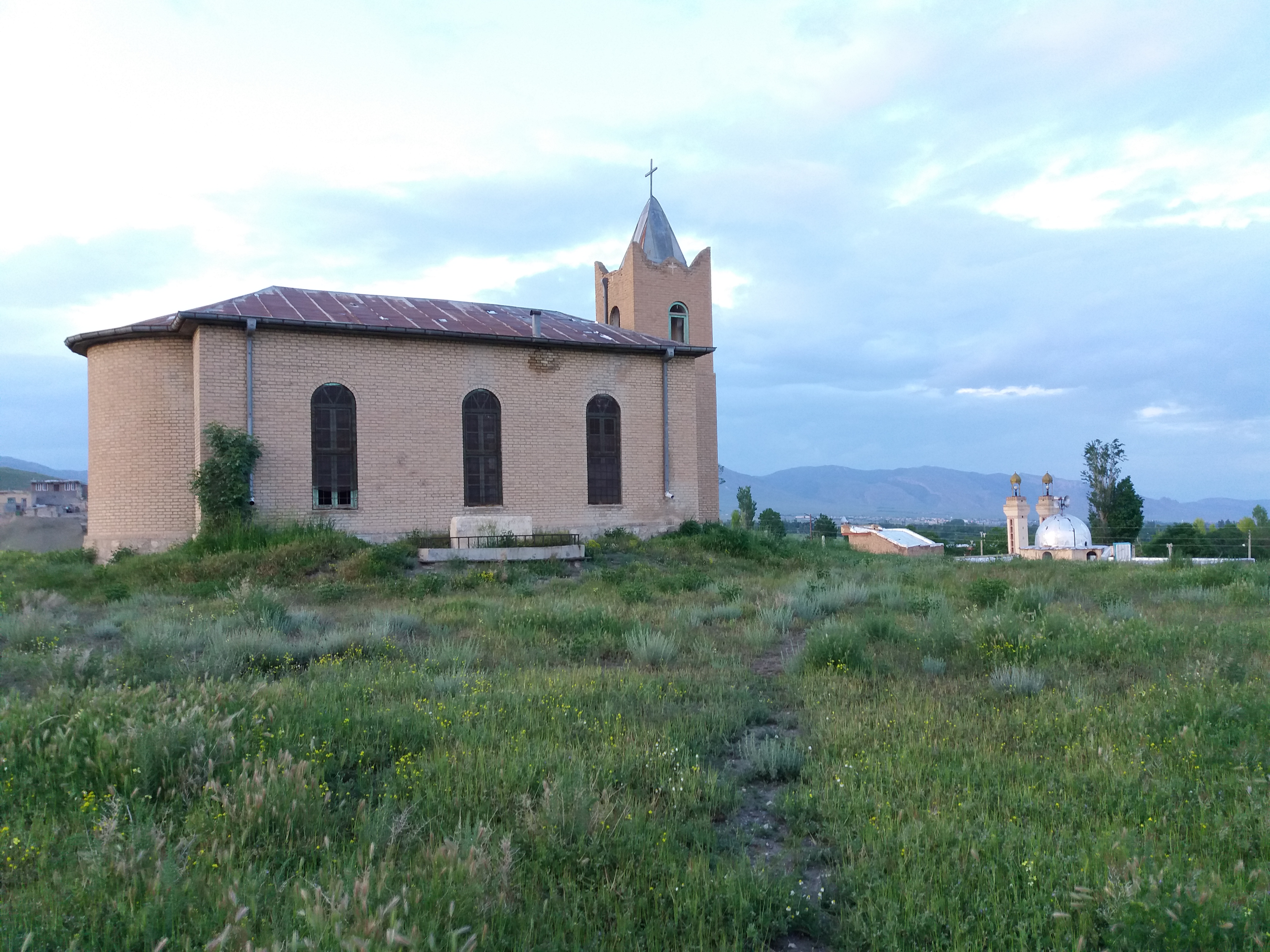
- Church of Mariyukhna-ye Gavlan

- Location within Iran
- Coordinates: 37°57′25″N 44°59′41″E
- Country: Iran
- Province: West Azerbaijan
- County: Urmia
- District: Anzal
- Rural District: Anzal-e Jonubi

Population (2016)
  - Total: 1,155
- Time zone: UTC+3:30 (IRST)

Gavlan (Persian: گولان, romanized: Gavlān; Syriac: Gāwīlan) (Note: Also known as Anzel, Gavilan, Gāvīlan, Gawlan, Gawalan, and Karilann.) is a village in Anzal-e Jonubi Rural District of Anzal District in Urmia County, West Azerbaijan province, Iran. It is inhabited by Kurdish-speaking Christian Assyrians, Sunni Muslim Kurds, and Shia Muslim Turks. There are three churches in the village and one mosque used by the Sunni and Shia Muslims.

== History ==
The Church of St. John at Gāwīlan is believed to date to between the 4th and 7th century AD. The Church of Mār Yōḥannān at Gāwīlan has been tentatively identified with the Monastery of Mār Yōḥannān at which Shimun IX Dinkha was elected as patriarch in 1580 and wrote a profession of faith in 1585.

Gāwīlan was inhabited by 55 Church of the East Christian families and was served by the Church of Mār Yōḥannān with no priests in 1862, according to the Russian archimandrite Sophoniah. There were 44 Church of the East Christian families with 3 priests and 1 church in 1877, as per Edward Lewes Cutts.

It was populated by 1000 Chaldean Catholics and was served by 3 priests and 1 church as part of the Chaldean Catholic Eparchy of Salmas in 1913. Prior to the First World War, there were 200 Assyrian houses at Gāwīlan, as per the list presented by Agha Petros to the Lausanne Peace Conference in 1922. Basil Nikitin, the Russian consul at Urmia, recorded that the village was entirely populated by Christians just before the First World War.

== Ecclesiastical history ==
Gāwīlan may be the diocese of Cian or Giennum, suffragan of the metropolis of Espurgan mentioned in a letter of Patriarch Abdisho IV Maron sent to Pope Pius IV in 1562 as one of the dioceses that recognised his authority. Gāwīlan was the seat of the diocese of Anzel whose bishops were traditionally called Yōḥannān. The diocese is traced back to Yōḥannān, metropolitan of Urmia, who was one of the three metropolitans who witnessed Patriarch Eliya VII's Catholic profession of faith at the Rabban Hormizd Monastery in 1586.

The bishop Yōḥannān of Anzel was previously the superior of the Monastery of Mār Ezekiel near Rustāqa in the Shemsdīn district according to colophons of 1804 and 1815; he died shortly before 1755. In 1831, the bishop Yōḥannān of Anzel resided at the village of Jamalabad instead of Gāwīlan. The American missionary Justin Perkins met Yōḥannān at Gāwīlan in October 1834. Yōḥannān had a nāṭar kursyā. The bishop Yōḥannān of Anzel fled to England in 1882 following an attack on Gāwīlan by Kurds.

== Demographics ==
=== Population ===
At the time of the 2006 National Census, the village's population was 1,084 in 263 households. The following census in 2011 counted 1,139 people in 292 households. The 2016 census measured the population of the village as 1,155 people in 302 households.

== Bibliography ==
- Al-Jeloo, Nicholas (2015). "Persian Christians: Assyrian art and architecture of Urmia as an example of regional cultural expression". Parole de l’Orient. 40: 13–27.
- Becker, Adam H. (2015). Revival and Awakening: American Evangelical Missionaries in Iran and the Origins of Assyrian Nationalism. University of Chicago Press.
- Fiey, Jean Maurice (1993). Pour un Oriens Christianus Novus: Répertoire des diocèses syriaques orientaux et occidentaux (in French).
- Gaunt, David (2006). Massacres, Resistance, Protectors: Muslim-Christian Relations in Eastern Anatolia during World War I. Gorgias Press.
- Hellot-Bellier, Florence (2017). "The Resistance of Urmia Assyrians to Violence at the Beginning of the Twentieth Century". In David Gaunt; Naures Atto; Soner O. Barthoma (eds.). Let Them Not Return: Sayfo – The Genocide against the Assyrian, Syriac and Chaldean Christians in the Ottoman Empire (PDF). pp. 70–99.
- Wilmshurst, David (2000). The Ecclesiastical Organisation of the Church of the East, 1318–1913 (PDF). Peeters Publishers.
