= Golanik-e Sofla =

Golanik-e Sofla گلانيك سفلي
- Village
- Location within Iran
- Coordinates: 37°53′16″N 44°54′26″E
- Country: Iran
- Province: West Azerbaijan
- County: Urmia
- Bakhsh: Anzal
- Rural District: Anzal-e Jonubi

Population (2006)
  - Total: 129
- Time zone: UTC+3:30 (IRST)
  - Summer (DST): UTC+4:30 (IRDT)

Golanik-e Sofla (Persian: گلانيك سفلي, also Romanized as Golānīk-e Soflá; also known as Golānīk-e Pā’īn and Kalānīk-e Pā'īn) is a village in Anzal-e Jonubi Rural District, Anzal District, Urmia County, West Azerbaijan Province, Iran. At the 2006 census, its population was 129, in 26 families.
