= Canal Macau =

Portuguese-language TV channel broadcast in Macau, China

- Country: China

Programming
- Languages: Portuguese and English
- Picture format: 16:9

Ownership
- Owner: Teledifusão de Macau, S.A.

History
- Launched: 13 May 1984; 17 September 1990 (standalone service)

Links
- Website: www.tdm.com.mo/en/ – Official website of TDM

Availability

Terrestrial
- Analogue: Channel 30 (Guia Mountain, until 2023)
- Digital: Channel 92

Canal Macau is a Portuguese-language television channel broadcast in Macau, China. Both Canal Macau and its sister, Cantonese language station TDM Ou Mun, are owned by TDM.

Local programmes usually broadcast daily from 4:00 pm to 1:00 am Macau Time (Except Sunday from 3:00 pm Macau Time for RTP África's África 7 Dias, a weekly news programme from Lusophone countries in Africa). As a result, programmes from RTP Mundo (Asia-Pacific feed) are usually relayed for other time schedules (with the exception of football matches). In addition, The Catholic Mass broadcasts live on Sunday mornings from the Igreja da Sé. Together, these programmes make Canal Macau a 24-hour television service.

== History ==
Until 1984, Macao had no television station. Viewers depended on TVB and ATV, whose target audience was Hong Kong, and did not meet local necessities. The colonial government also lacked a television outlet to air political propaganda in its favor.

The first known proposal for a television station in Macau came in 1963, when a Hong Kong businessman teamed up with the Pacific Television Corporation of Japan to set up a station there. In 1964, local company F. Rodrigues submitted a second proposal to create a television station to suit local interests. Both ideas were rejected. It wasn't until after 1974 that the plan was revived. A working group was established in 1978, by September 1979, it was reported that Rádiotelevisão Portuguesa (RTP) from the Portuguese mainland would reportedly be its owner. After the cessation of the RTP-owned broadcasting company, the independent TDM was created, inheriting Rádio Macau and establishing plans for the TV channel. Rádio e Televisão de Portugal provided training to provide the locals with the necessary equipment to set up the station. On 5 May 1984, a test pattern appeared, one week before regular broadcasts started.

TDM started television broadcasts on 13 May 1984, on a single UHF channel (channel 30 from Guia Mountain) in Portuguese and Cantonese, with the nightly schedule, 18:00 to 23:00 every evening, being divided between the two languages. The first day featured an inaugural speech from governor to Macau Almeida e Costa; the first news bulletin in Portuguese was read by José Alberto de Sousa, while the first in Cantonese was read by Marina Tang. The programing was introduced by Johnny Reis (João Sameiro Afonso dos Reis), a well-known Macaese radio personality of the time. At the end of 1984, it started producing new television content, including a horse-pulled car racing tournament and the funeral of Ho Yin. On 18 November, it aired the Macao Grand Prix with TVB, and on 13 April 1987, the signing of the Luso-Chinese agreement live by satellite.

During the single-channel years, programming in Portuguese was subtitled into Chinese, while programming in Cantonese was subtitled into Portuguese. After concerns from viewers that the subtitles blocked the screen, an electronic machine had to be created by a Chinese engineer to process subtitles properly. Local production increased by 1986, when the Luso-Chinese declaration regarding the future of Macau was signed on 13 April 1987, TDM was ready to follow local political events.

After the restructuring of TDM into a public-private company, the channel's airtime increased significantly from 1 July 1989: from 07:00 to 21:00, it aired the Cantonese service, while from 21:00 to 00:00, it aired the Portuguese service. Beginning 17 September 1990, the Cantonese programming moved to its own channel, while the existing channel was renamed TDM Canal 1 and became the standalone Portuguese channel. Even after the split, the channel still employs bilingual staff, mostly young.

By 2003, Canal 1 was broadcasting 24 hours a day. On 29 March 2007, the channel was renamed Canal Macau, its current name.

Beginning 25 September 2017, its line-up expanded to twelve hours, from 1pm to 1am (10:30am to 1am on weekends), positioning itself as an alternative to RTP Internacional, as well as reducing its relays.

== Audience status ==
Due to lack of talent, TDM's capacity to produce its own shows is weak, and its programs cannot compete with Hong Kong channels. This causes TDM's ratings to be limited. The president of TDM's executive committee, João Leong Kam Chun, also said that TDM is not the first choice for television among Macanese locals. Since the number of Portuguese speakers in Macao is estimated to be at 2%, the market share for Portuguese channels is limited.

== See also ==
- Media of Macau
