= Hammamlar =

Village in West Azerbaijan province, Iran

Hammamlar Persian: حماملار
- Village
- Location within Iran
- Coordinates: 37°52′40″N 44°57′24″E
- Country: Iran
- Province: West Azerbaijan
- County: Urmia
- District: Anzal
- Rural District: Anzal-e Jonubi

Population (2016)
  - Total: 856
- Time zone: UTC+3:30 (IRST)

Hammamlar (Persian: حماملار) (Note: Also romanized as Ḩammāmlār; also known as Hamānlār) is a village in Anzal-e Jonubi Rural District of Anzal District in Urmia County, West Azerbaijan province, Iran.

== Demographics ==
=== Ethnicity and religion ===
This village populated by Azerbaijani Turks with Sunni Hanafi religion.

=== Population ===
At the time of the 2006 National Census, the village's population was 936 in 177 households. The following census in 2011 counted 890 people in 215 households. The 2016 census measured the population of the village as 856 people in 208 households.
