= Moqitalu =

Village in West Azerbaijan province, Iran

Moqitalu Persian: مقيطالو
- Village
- Location within Iran
- Coordinates: 38°02′16″N 45°08′49″E
- Country: Iran
- Province: West Azerbaijan
- County: Urmia
- District: Anzal
- Rural District: Anzal-e Shomali

Population (2016)
  - Total: 20
- Time zone: UTC+3:30 (IRST)

Moqitalu (Persian: مقيطالو) (Note: Also romanized as Meqī Ţālū, Meqīţālū, and Moqītālū; also known as Moghitaloo, Mowqatez, Mugaiz, Mukatel’, Mūqatel, and Mūqātol) is a village in Anzal-e Shomali Rural District of Anzal District in Urmia County, West Azerbaijan province, Iran.

== Demographics ==
=== Population ===
At the time of the 2006 National Census, the village's population was 42 in 15 households. The following census in 2011 counted 33 people in 11 households. The 2016 census measured the population of the village as 20 people in seven households.
