= Bari, West Azerbaijan =

Village in West Azerbaijan province, Iran

Bari Persian: باري
- Village
- Location within Iran
- Coordinates: 38°00′31″N 45°03′32″E
- Country: Iran
- Province: West Azerbaijan
- County: Urmia
- District: Anzal
- Rural District: Anzal-e Shomali

Population (2016)
  - Total: 138
- Time zone: UTC+3:30 (IRST)

Bari (Persian: باري) (Note: Also romanized as Bārī and Bary; also known as Bāre and Bāreh) is a village in Anzal-e Shomali Rural District of Anzal District in Urmia County, West Azerbaijan province, Iran.

== Demographics ==
=== Population ===
At the time of the 2006 National Census, the village's population was 168 in 53 households. The following census in 2011 counted 146 people in 52 households. The 2016 census measured the population of the village as 138 people in 52 households.
