= Kahriz, Urmia =

Village in West Azerbaijan province, Iran

Kahriz Persian: كهريز
- Village
- Location within Iran
- Coordinates: 37°52′21″N 44°58′09″E
- Country: Iran
- Province: West Azerbaijan
- County: Urmia
- District: Anzal
- Rural District: Anzal-e Jonubi

Population (2016)
  - Total: 2,973
- Time zone: UTC+3:30 (IRST)

Kahriz (Persian: كهريز) (Note: Also romanized as Kahrīz; Azerbaijani: کهریز) is a village in Anzal-e Jonubi Rural District of Anzal District in Urmia County, West Azerbaijan province, Iran.

== Demographics ==
=== Ethnicity and religion ===
The village is populated by Azerbaijanians who are followers of the Sunni Hanafi religion.

=== Population ===
At the time of the 2006 National Census, the village's population was 2,553 in 560 households. The following census in 2011 counted 3,394 people in 698 households. The 2016 census measured the population of the village as 2,973 people in 692 households.
