= Jabal Kandi, Anzal =

Jabal Kandi جبل كندي
- Village
- Location within Iran
- Coordinates: 37°51′37″N 45°02′10″E
- Country: Iran
- Province: West Azerbaijan
- County: Urmia
- Bakhsh: Anzal
- Rural District: Anzal-e Jonubi

Population (2006)
  - Total: 388
- Time zone: UTC+3:30 (IRST)
  - Summer (DST): UTC+4:30 (IRDT)

Jabal Kandi (Persian: جبل كندي,Azerbaijani: Cəbəlkəndi, also Romanized as Jabal Kandī and Jabalkandī) is a village in Anzal-e Jonubi Rural District, Anzal District, Urmia County, West Azerbaijan Province, Iran. At the 2006 census, its population was 388, in 84 families. This village is populated by Azerbaijanis.
