= Golanik-e Olya =

Golanik-e Olya گلانيكعليا
- Village
- Location within Iran
- Coordinates: 37°52′18″N 44°52′16″E
- Country: Iran
- Province: West Azerbaijan
- County: Urmia
- Bakhsh: Anzal
- Rural District: Anzal-e Jonubi

Population (2006)
  - Total: 55
- Time zone: UTC+3:30 (IRST)
  - Summer (DST): UTC+4:30 (IRDT)

Golanik-e Olya (Persian: گلانيكعليا, also Romanized as Golānīk-e ‘Olyā; also known as Kalānīk-e Bālā) is a village in Anzal-e Jonubi Rural District, Anzal District, Urmia County, West Azerbaijan Province, Iran. At the 2006 census, its population was 55, in 12 families.
