= Hajji Bayram =

Hajji Bayram may refer to:

== Places ==
- Hajji Bayram, Iran
- Bagaran, Armavir, Amenia

== People ==
- Haji Bayram Veli, Ottoman Turkish poet, Sufi saint, and founder of the Bayramiyya order
