= Chu Mei-feng =

Taiwanese TV journalist and politician

- 璩美鳳
- Occupation: Journalist

Chu Mei-feng (Chinese: 璩美鳳; pinyin: Qú Měifèng) is a Taiwanese TV journalist, former Taipei City Councillor, and former director of Hsinchu City's Bureau of Cultural Affairs. In addition she was publisher of "Exclusive Report Weekly," a former confidential secretary to Kinmen County Council Chairman Wang Zaisheng, chairman of the Chinese Solidarity Union Party, and also spokesperson for the Chinese Unification Promotion Party.

== Early life and education ==
Chu graduated from Xinheguomin Primary School, followed by Taipei Municipal Huajiang Senior High School, Taipei First Girls' High School, National Chengchi University, and Metropolitan State University. She has worked for the China Morning Edition and the Zili Evening Paper.

== Biography ==
While a journalist of TTV World News, Chu took photographs at a lesbian bar without disclosing it to the people featured in the images. This led to some lesbians being publicly revealed, and even resulted in some suicides. Additionally, she implied that Taiwanese actress Pan Mei Chen was a lesbian. Chu was confirmed to have broken the ethical standards of journalism and proceeded to leave TTV World News.

Chu became the news director and host for CSTV after she left TTV. Meanwhile, she joined the New Party, becoming a Taipei City Councillor in 1994. She came to prominence when she exposed the "Sung Chi-li event" in 1996. This concerned the chairman of the Democratic Progressive Party, Frank Hsieh, who received $16 million from Sung Chi-li as a fee for serving him as legal counsel. Also, the wife of Frank Hsieh, Yu Fang-chih, wrote Cosmic Light for Song to seek profits.

Chu was MC in a rally for the 1998 Taipei mayor election. To help the New Party candidate, Yang Tai-shun, get elected, Chu recorded a show reporting news of the New Party and Yang Tai-shun at 11:00 p.m. that night, which violated the Civil Servants Election and Recall Act. This act forbade any coverage of the rally after 10:00 p.m. that night.

Chu became Director of Cultural Affairs Bureau of the Hsinchu City Hall in 1998. At the time, she was rumored to be dating the mayor of Hsinchu, James Tsai. She was nominated by the New Party as a candidate for a legislative seat in Taichung but failed to be elected.

Chu left office in 2001 due to fallout from a sex tape released by Scoop Weekly showing her having sex with her married lover, businessman Tseng Chung-ming. She eventually countersued the publication for libel.

In 2002, she began a career as a singer. She later returned to Taiwan.

In June 2005, Chu married a man named Simon who was fourteen years her junior. After they married, they ran a cafeteria together in England.

In 2007, she hosted TV news for Macau Asia Satellite Television.

Chu went back to Taiwan to meet Shen Rong, publisher of the 2001 tabloid exposure, who was newly released from prison on 26 February 2008.

In July 2008, Macau Asia Satellite Television announced that Chu was being removed from the position of Vice-Master of television and would be sent to host a talk show in Shenzhen. However, she denied this when she was interviewed on 27 October 2008.

In February 2009, Chu went back to Taiwan to host the 9th Mainland, Hong Kong, and Macau Business Cooperation Conference. At that time, she looked unwell and she explained later that it was because she was under severe pressure because of owing money on three housing loans in Taiwan and another in America. Chu was recalled by the Macau Asia Satellite Television in May 2009 at the end of her contract. In Nov 2009, she admitted her marriage with her ex-husband Simon had only lasted for a year and a half and that the ownership of the cafeteria was wholly Simon's.

Chu issued a statement declaring that she had resigned the position of CEO of Hubei Television on 2 September 2010. However, the director of Hubei Television said that Chu had never been CEO and that they didn't actually know Chu at all. In fact, Hubei Television had no position titled CEO.

On 29 October 2012, Chu announced her comeback.

2018 Kaohsiung City mayoral results
No.	Candidate	Party	Votes	Percentage
1	Han Kuo-yu	Kuomintang	892,545	53.87%
2	Chen Chi-mai	Democratic Progressive Party	742,239	44.80%
3	Chu Mei-feng	Independent	7,998	0.48%
4	Su Ying-kuei	Independent	14,125	0.85%
Total voters			2,281,338	
Valid votes			1,656,907	
Invalid votes				
Voter turnout			72.63%	

== TV and MC Experience ==
- TTV, "Everybody likes Entertainment"
- Zhonghua TV, "Feichangshidai"
- Macau Asia Satellite Television, "Beautiful Feng's View of World" and "Liang-an-min-sheng" (the latter of which was cancelled due to low ratings)
