= GOALTV =

GoalTV
- Country: Hong Kong, Asia
- Broadcast area: Regional
- Headquarters: Hong Kong

Programming
- Languages: English, French

Ownership
- Owner: Yes Television Limited (Astro Overseas Limited/Astro Holdings Sdn Bhd)
- Sister channels: All Sports Network

History
- Launched: 1 January 1993
- Closed: 1 June 2013 (Singapore); 2 June 2013 (Hong Kong and Asia)

GOALTV was a football network offering Asia audiences coverage of European football. This included live games from three major European leagues as well as behind-the-scenes access to three Premier League clubs in England, Manchester City, Chelsea and Liverpool, in addition to FC Barcelona & Real Madrid FC of Spain.

Goal TV has closed down on 1 June 2013 in Singapore via SingTel mio TV Service and other Pay TV Providers in South East Asia with effect from 2 June 2013 and 3 June 2013 for website.

== Programs on Goal TV 1 ==
- Real Madrid TV
- Barça TV
- City TV
- Eredivisie
- FCB TV
- Manchester City TV
- RMTV
- Scottish Premier League
- Football League Championship
- Football League Cup
- Ligue 1

== Programs on Goal TV 2 ==
- Barca TV
- Chelsea TV
- City TV
- LFC TV
- Bayern Munich TV
- Eredivisie
- Football League Championship

== On air ==
Country	Affiliate	Comments
Malaysia and Brunei	Astro	Selected programmes on Astro SuperSport full channels launched in 2008
Singapore	mio TV	Channel 140 & 141 (old number not in use and is used for mio Sports Channels)and also(use for singtel sport multiview)
Hong Kong	now TV	Channels 638 & 639
Macau	Macau Cable TV	Channels 36 & 37
Thailand	CTH	Channels 1 & 2
Thailand	TrueVisions	Channels (no test run)
India and the Indian subcontinent	TEN Sports	Selected programmes
India and the Indian subcontinent	Zee Sports	Selected programmes
People's Republic of China	Guangzhou Television	Selected programmes on Guangzhou Competition Channel
Vietnam	VTC Digital	Since 2010
Vietnam	K+	Until 2010
Vietnam	VTVCab	Until 2010
Philippines
Philippines	SkyCable	Channel 110 & 111
Philippines	Cablelink	N/A
Philippines	Destiny Cable	N/A
Cignal Digital TV	N/A	
Indonesia	TelkomVision	channels 101 & 111
Indonesia	First Media	channels 151 & 152
Indonesia	Skynindo	channels 52 & 53
