= Jamalabad, Urmia =

Village in West Azerbaijan province, Iran

Jamalabad Persian: جمال اباد
- Village
- Location within Iran
- Coordinates: 37°58′15″N 45°00′23″E
- Country: Iran
- Province: West Azerbaijan
- County: Urmia
- District: Anzal
- Rural District: Anzal-e Shomali

Population (2016)
  - Total: 158
- Time zone: UTC+3:30 (IRST)

Jamalabad (Persian: جمال اباد, romanized: Jamālābād; Syriac: Jāmālābād) (Note: Also known as Djamalabad, Djamalawa, Jamāl-Ābād, Jamlav, and Sūlīng.) is a village in Anzal-e Shomali Rural District of Anzal District in Urmia County, West Azerbaijan province, Iran.

== History ==
The Church of St Anne at Jāmālābād is believed to date to between the 4th and 7th century AD. In 1831, Yoḥannan, Church of the East bishop of Anzel, resided at Jamalabad instead of Gavlan, which had customarily been the residence of the bishop of Anzel. There were 33 Church of the East families who were served by one priest and the Church of Mār Yōḥannān at Jamalabad in 1862, according to the Russian archimandrite Sophoniah. By 1877, the village was inhabited by 15 Church of the East families with 1 church but no priests, as per Edward Lewes Cutts. Jamalabad was attacked by Kurds in May and June 1908, at which time a small unit of Iranian troops was stationed there. Basil Nikitin, the Russian consul at Urmia, recorded that the village was populated by Christians and Muslims just before the First World War. Prior to the First World War, there were 300 Assyrian houses at Jamalabad, as per the list presented by Agha Petros to the Lausanne Peace Conference in 1922. It was located in the Anzel district.

== Demographics ==
=== Population ===
At the time of the 2006 National Census, the village's population was 209 in 67 households. The following census in 2011 counted 213 people in 72 households. The 2016 census measured the population of the village as 158 people in 60 households.

== Bibliography ==
- Al-Jeloo, Nicholas (2015). "Persian Christians: Assyrian art and architecture of Urmia as an example of regional cultural expression". Parole de l’Orient. 40: 13–27.
- Gaunt, David (2006). Massacres, Resistance, Protectors: Muslim-Christian Relations in Eastern Anatolia during World War I. Gorgias Press.
- Hellot-Bellier, Florence (2017). "The Resistance of Urmia Assyrians to Violence at the Beginning of the Twentieth Century". In David Gaunt; Naures Atto; Soner O. Barthoma (eds.). Let Them Not Return: Sayfo – The Genocide against the Assyrian, Syriac and Chaldean Christians in the Ottoman Empire (PDF). pp. 70–99.
- Wilmshurst, David (2000). The Ecclesiastical Organisation of the Church of the East, 1318–1913 (PDF). Peeters Publishers.
