= Qarah Bagh, West Azerbaijan =

Village in West Azerbaijan province, Iran

Qarah Bagh Persian: قره ‌باغ
- Village
- Location within Iran
- Coordinates: 38°04′26″N 45°03′58″E
- Country: Iran
- Province: West Azerbaijan
- County: Urmia
- District: Anzal
- Rural District: Anzal-e Shomali

Population (2016)
  - Total: 1,130
- Time zone: UTC+3:30 (IRST)

Qarah Bagh (Persian: قره‌باغ) (Note: Also romanized as Qarah Bāgh and Qareh Bāgh; also known as Ghareh Bagh, Karabakh, and Qara Bāgh; Armenian: Ղարաբաղ) is a village in, and the capital of, Anzal-e Shomali Rural District in Anzal District of Urmia County, West Azerbaijan province, Iran. The rural district was previously administered from the city of Qushchi.

== Demographics ==
=== Population ===
At the time of the 2006 National Census, the village's population was 1,303 in 389 households. The following census in 2011 counted 1,221 people in 414 households. The 2016 census measured the population of the village as 1,130 people in 376 households. It was the most populous village in its rural district.
