= Kani Shurik, Anzal =

Kani Shurik كاني شوريك
- Village
- Location within Iran
- Coordinates: 37°52′28″N 44°53′04″E
- Country: Iran
- Province: West Azerbaijan
- County: Urmia
- Bakhsh: Anzal
- Rural District: Anzal-e Jonubi

Population (2006)
  - Total: 89
- Time zone: UTC+3:30 (IRST)
  - Summer (DST): UTC+4:30 (IRDT)

Kani Shurik (Persian: كاني شوريك, also Romanized as Kānī Shūrīk; also known as Kānī Shūrak) is a village in Anzal-e Jonubi Rural District, Anzal District, Urmia County, West Azerbaijan Province, Iran. At the 2006 census, its population was 89, in 16 families.
