= Kazim-Dashi =

Kazem-Dashi
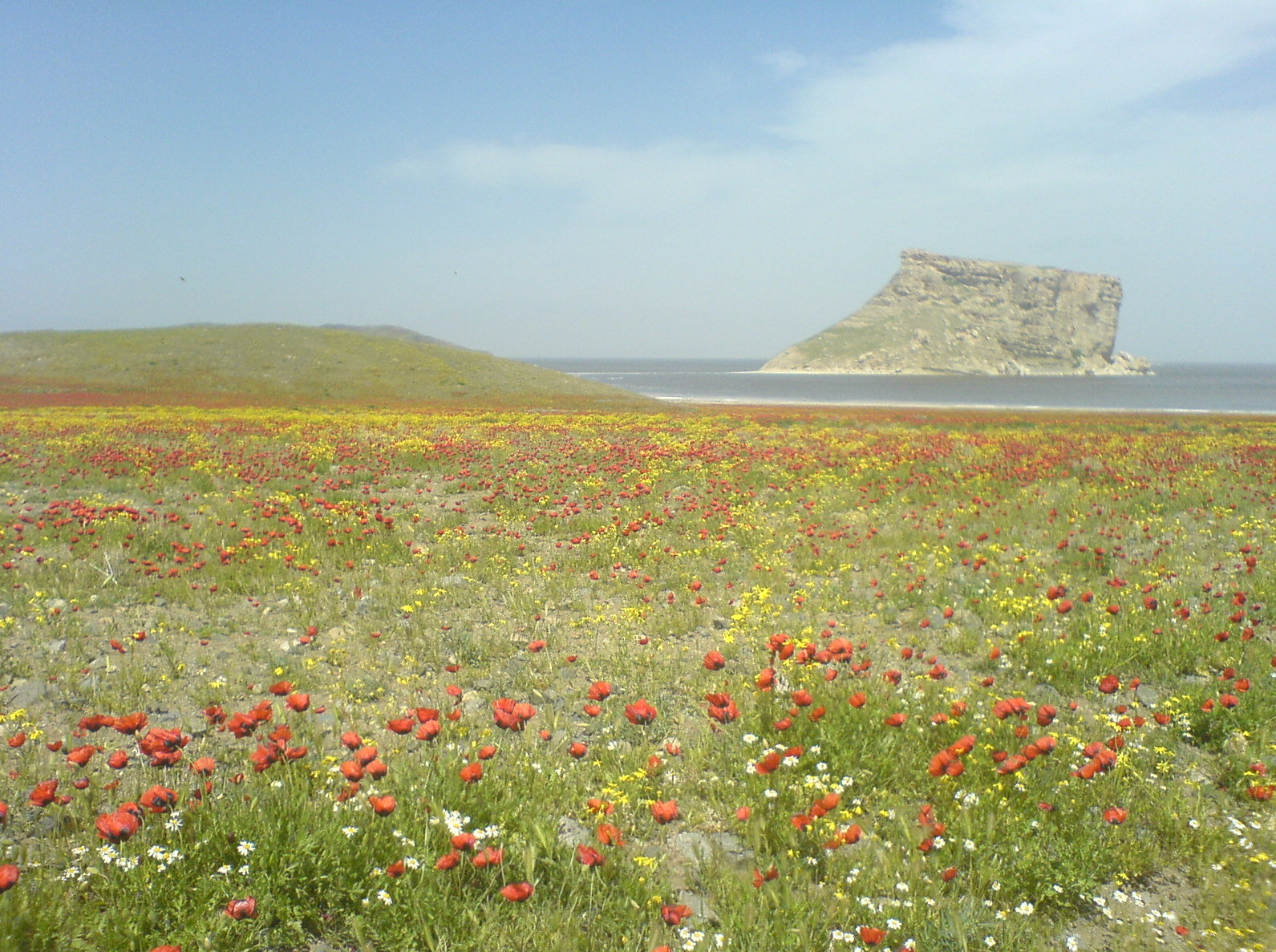
- Kazem-Dashi in background

Highest point
- Elevation: 1,364 m (4,475 ft)
- Coordinates: 38°03′26″N 45°11′50″E

Geography
- Location within Iran
- Location: Lake Urmia, West Azarbaijan, Iran

Kazem-Dashi is a rock, located in about fifty meters from shore in Lake Urmia. Because of its beautiful nature, it is one of the tourist attractions in West Azarbaijan province of Iran.

== Name ==
At various times in Iranian history, including during World War I, this place provided a safe haven for the surrounding villagers. The rock is named in memory of Kazem Khan, who himself was the commander of the guards of the village of Gorchin Qalah.

== Lake Urmia’s Challenges ==
Lake Urmia in northwestern Iran nearly dried up in the fall of 2023. The largest lake in the Middle East and one of the largest Hypersaline lakes on Earth, the lake has largely been reduced to a vast, dry salt flat. In 1995, Lake Urmia reached its highest water level; then, over the next two decades, the lake level dropped by more than 7 meters (23 feet), losing almost 90 percent of its surface area. But due to mismanagement and damming of the rivers that feed the lake, the use of these rivers for agriculture, as well as the relative impacts of climate change, the lake has been transformed into a salt flat with ecological and human threats, and Kazem-Dashi Island is no longer as prosperous as it once was.
