= Najafabad, West Azerbaijan =

Village in West Azerbaijan province, Iran

Najafabad Persian: نجف اباد
- Village
- Location within Iran
- Coordinates: 38°04′59″N 45°06′10″E
- Country: Iran
- Province: West Azerbaijan
- County: Urmia
- District: Anzal
- Rural District: Anzal-e Shomali

Population (2016)
  - Total: 294
- Time zone: UTC+3:30 (IRST)

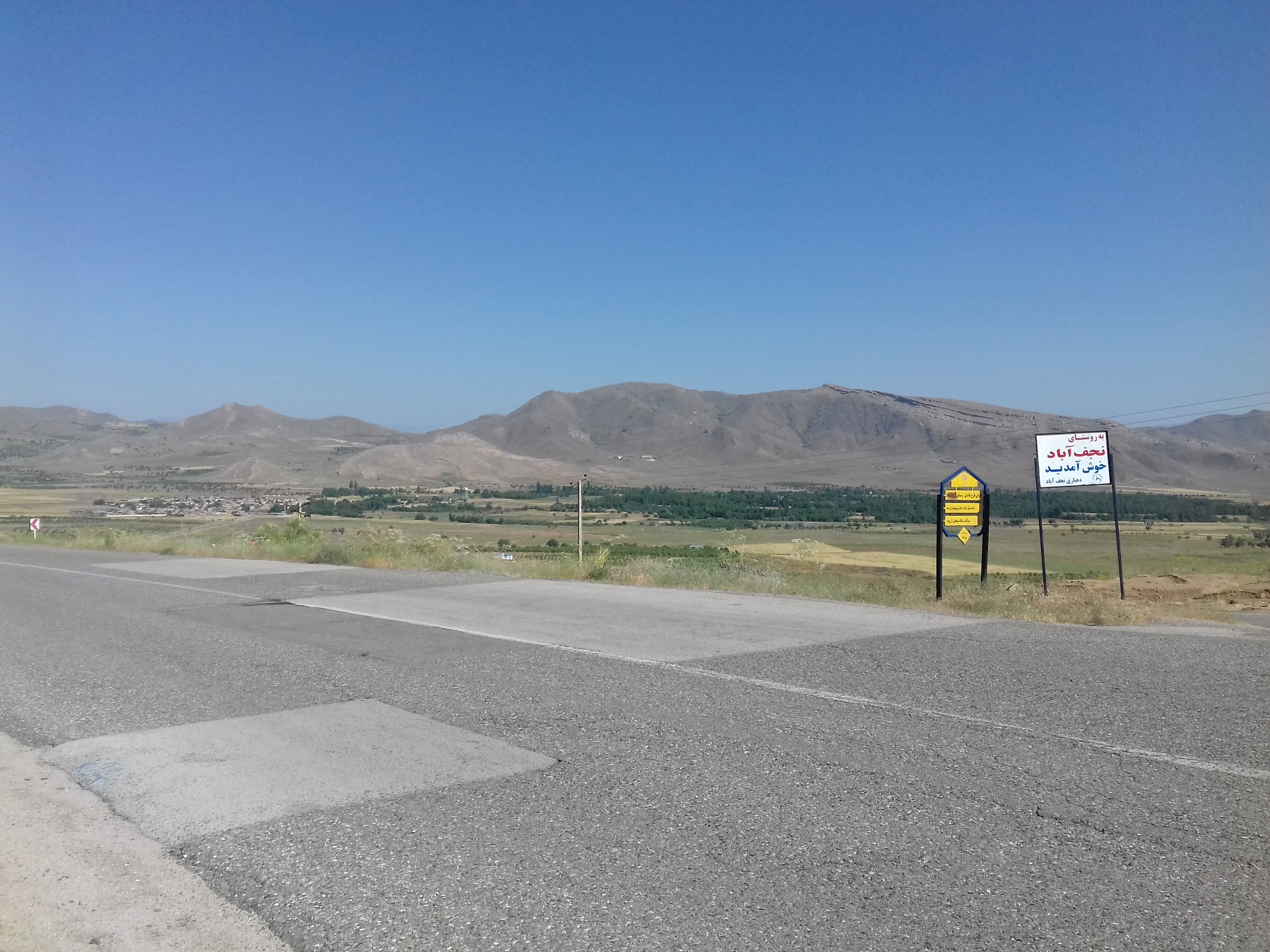
The outskirts of Najaf Abad village in Urmia

Najafabad (Persian: نجف اباد) (Note: Also romanized as Najafābād; also known as Boidash, Boydash, Bū Bedasht, Būīdāsh (بويداش), Būydāgh, and Būydasht) is a village in Anzal-e Shomali Rural District of Anzal District in Urmia County, West Azerbaijan province, Iran.

== Demographics ==
=== Population ===
At the time of the 2006 National Census, the village's population was 349 in 107 households. The following census in 2011 counted 322 people in 119 households. The 2016 census measured the population of the village as 294 people in 113 households.
