= Gol Tappeh, West Azerbaijan =

Village in West Azerbaijan province, Iran

Gol Tappeh Persian: گل تپه
- Village
- Location within Iran
- Coordinates: 37°53′23″N 45°02′22″E
- Country: Iran
- Province: West Azerbaijan
- County: Urmia
- District: Anzal
- Rural District: Anzal-e Jonubi

Population (2016)
  - Total: 1,961
- Time zone: UTC+3:30 (IRST)

Gol Tappeh (Persian: گل تپه) is a village in Anzal-e Jonubi Rural District of Anzal District in Urmia County, West Azerbaijan province, Iran.

== Demographics ==
=== Ethnicity ===
The village is populated mostly by Azerbaijanis but also Kurds.

=== Population ===
At the time of the 2006 National Census, the village's population was 1,894 in 365 households. The following census in 2011 counted 1,864 people in 482 households. The 2016 census measured the population of the village as 1,961 people in 536 households.
