= Qalqachi =

Village in West Azerbaijan province, Iran

Qalqachi Persian: قالقاچي
- Village
- Location within Iran
- Coordinates: 38°06′26″N 45°08′17″E
- Country: Iran
- Province: West Azerbaijan
- County: Urmia
- District: Anzal
- Rural District: Anzal-e Shomali

Population (2016)
  - Total: 160
- Time zone: UTC+3:30 (IRST)

Qalqachi (Persian: قالقاچي) (Note: Also romanized as Qālqāchī and Qolqāchī; also known as Ghalghachi, Kolgachi, Kūlgachī, Kulkachi, and Kūlqāshī) is a village in Anzal-e Shomali Rural District of Anzal District in Urmia County, West Azerbaijan province, Iran.

== Demographics ==
=== Population ===
At the time of the 2006 National Census, the village's population was 269 in 73 households. The following census in 2011 counted 215 people in 72 households. The 2016 census measured the population of the village as 160 people in 55 households.
