= Qulonji =

Village in West Azerbaijan province, Iran

Qulonji Persian: قولنجي
- Village
- Location within Iran
- Coordinates: 37°56′03″N 44°59′30″E
- Country: Iran
- Province: West Azerbaijan
- County: Urmia
- District: Anzal
- Rural District: Anzal-e Jonubi

Population (2016)
  - Total: 5,192
- Time zone: UTC+3:30 (IRST)

Qulonji (Persian: قولنجي) (Note: Also romanized as Qūlonjī; also known as Ghoolanji and Kulungi) is a village in, and the capital of, Anzal-e Jonubi Rural District in Anzal District of Urmia County, West Azerbaijan province, Iran.

== Demographics ==
=== Population ===
At the time of the 2006 National Census, the village's population was 4,955 in 1,224 households. The following census in 2011 counted 5,248 people in 1,602 households. The 2016 census measured the population of the village as 5,192 people in 1,566 households. It was the most populous village in its rural district.
