= RTP Mundo =

Portuguese international television channel

- Country: Portugal
- Broadcast area: Worldwide

Programming
- Picture format: 576i (16:9 SDTV)

Ownership
- Owner: Rádio e Televisão de Portugal
- Sister channels: RTP1; RTP2; RTP Notícias; RTP Desporto; RTP Memória; RTP Açores; RTP Madeira; RTP África; RTP Zig Zag

History
- Launched: 10 June 1992; 34 years ago
- Former names: RTP Internacional (1992–2026)

Links
- Website: RTP Mundo

Availability

Terrestrial
- Digital terrestrial television (Andorra): Channel 28

Streaming media
- RTP Play: RTP Mundo

RTP Mundo is a Portuguese free-to-air television channel owned and operated by state-owned public broadcaster Rádio e Televisão de Portugal (RTP). It is the company's international television service, and is known for broadcasting a mix of programming from other RTP's channels, as well as original productions made for the channel. It is considered to be the first truly-global Lusophone television channel, meant to target both the Portuguese diaspora and the Lusophone populations around the world.

The channel is available on several satellites in the clear, on a number of subscription television operators and terrestrially in Macao (relayed by Canal Macau) and East Timor (relayed by RTTL), by means of timeshares with other channels.

== History ==
=== Background ===
Before the appearance of the channel, RTP signed a contract with Intelsat to provide a program for the Portuguese diaspora in the United States, Canada, and Bermuda, Portugal Magazine, created in 1988 with assistance from RTP's facilities in Oporto. Outside of the intended target countries, the program was sent by video to other parts of the world.

In the late 1980s, following Portugal's entry into the European Economic Commission, RTP started sketching means to deliver television programs to the Portuguese diaspora, largely eyeing the Lusophone countries in Africa.

RTP Internacional was first planned in early 1992 by José Eduardo Moniz as part of the strategic plan for the 35th anniversary of RTP's first broadcast. The channel was formally created on 21 February 1992, under the management of journalist Afonso Rato, who demanded "active television" for the Portuguese diaspora. Productions from the then-upcoming private channels SIC and TVI were blocked weeks after the channel's launch.

=== Launch and early years ===
It first started broadcasting via satellite in Europe on 10 June 1992 (Portugal Day), with a visit from then-prime minister Cavaco Silva. The channel, the fifth RTP channel overall to be launched, initially broadcast 39 hours a week (5 hours on weekdays, 7 on Saturdays and 9 on Sundays over two satellites, Eutelsat (Ku band) in Europe and Statsionar-12 (Intersputnik, C-band), enabling the channel's reach to extend to Africa and parts of Asia, including Goa and Macau. On 19 December the channel expanded to North America by means of the Galaxy-6 satellite. The aim of the new channel was to "accentuate the penetration of the Portuguese language and culture and that, taking advantage of technological potential that was unthinkable years ago, will bring us all closer together, making our world smaller". The public presentation took place in Lisbon a week ahead of the launch of the service, in a project that took four months to create. On the eve of the launch, José Eduardo Moniz claimed that the service, thanks to a growing number of national output on the group of the four RTP channels (2 national and 2 regional) showed the desire of the Portuguese diaspora to provide necessary communication. Before, RTP tried - unsuccessfully - to beam its four channels by satellite to Africa, which was made impossible due to technological issues. It soon expanded into Africa, where it reached audiences in Portuguese-speaking countries, as well as Canada, United States, Brazil and into Asia. It is also available on the Internet, via a subscription to the service JumpTV or with Octoshape.

On 16 September 1993, the channel moved to Eutelsat II, where TVE Internacional and the RAI channels were already present, and expanded its airtime to 70 hours a week.

On 10 January 1995, RTP Internacional expanded to a ten-hour schedule. In March 1995, the announced that it would start broadcasting AsiaSat-2 satellite, which was set to launch in the third quarter of the year. CPRM leased one transponder to carry both it and Antena 1. The goal was to cover expats in Australia and Japan and nationals in Goa, Macao and East Timor. Finally, on June 10, the channel started a 24-hour schedule. In 1996, it broadcast on five satellites (Eutelsat II-F2, Express 2, Telstar 302, Stationar 12 and AsiaSat-2).

Terrestrial broadcasts started in East Timor in January 1996. The launch of the service began with a political message from António Guterres and a representative of the Timorese independence movement. The RTP Internacional relay caused interest from RCTI to compete with the station as long as RTP would begin broadcasting content in English, which was never achieved.

By 1997, the channel was made available to at least 8.5 million subscriber homes, surpassing the one million benchmark in countries with high Portuguese immigration: France, Switzerland, the United States and Brazil. As that year was also its fifth anniversary, the channel celebrated with a week of special programming. A special program for the fifth anniversary of the channel, Aqui Tão Perto: Portugal - Camões - Comunidades was broadcast, simultaneously with RTP2, for a period of approximately fourteen hours. The diaspora groups are connected via satellite in 30-minute slots and featured a report about the Portuguese diaspora in the particular country on those slots. The slots were given to the following countries, all of them with significant numbers of Portuguese diaspora: the United States, Canada, Venezuela, South Africa, Australia, Germany, Switzerland, France and Luxembourg. In September that year, it broke its Brazilian exclusivity agreement with TVA and started exploiting the possibility of joining other providers.

On 7 January 1998, RTPi ceased terrestrial broadcasting to Portuguese-speaking countries in Africa, and was replaced by a new separate service, called RTP África, which was available as a terrestrial TV service in some countries, as well as being available via satellite, but RTPi continues to broadcast in Angola and Mozambique. RTPi is carried by satellite television services across Africa in various countries such as South Africa, Namibia and Zimbabwe. In September, it launched on the Deutsche Telekom-owned digital cable network's newly-launched package for foreign residents (the service is now owned by Vodafone).

=== 2000s ===
In March 2005, it began 'time-shifting' its programming, with three separate schedules for the Americas, Europe, and Asia, so that viewers in different time zones could watch programmes at more convenient times.

In September 2007, it signed a new deal with Intelsat to deliver its signal on Intelsat 907 (EMEA feed, shared with RTP África and Intelsat 805 (Americas feed).

In 2009, the three feeds recalibrated their programming to cater to primetime slots in the target areas.

=== 2010s ===
Discussion took place during the 2011 RTP reforms when Miguel Relvas' cabinet announced its intent to relaunch RTP Internacional as TV Portugal, as the corporation's biggest investment in the immediate future; this came at a time where the channel's new brand identity was being studied. This implied, by December, that universities and private companies would also inject capital into the channel.

The former RTP International logo, used from 2012 to 2016.

On 30 March 2012, RTP Internacional rebranded with a new logo designed by Santa Fé (see left) with five stripes arranged to resemble a Portuguese identity by resorting to the colors of the flag of Portugal. This came in line with a revamp to its schedule and an attempt to attract a younger demographic.

On 6 January 2014, RTP Internacional announced the creation of separate editions of Telejornal for RTP Internacional Ásia and RTP Internacional América. The goal of these bulletins was to provide a prime time news bulletin for the target areas, instead of depending on 24 Horas in the Americas and Jornal da Tarde in Asia. The regular 8pm bulletin continued to air live on the EMEA feed.

=== 2020s ===
The channel returned to Sky Brasil after an 18-year absence on 20 August 2022, replacing SIC Internacional. The channel had been available to some former DirecTV subscribers during the 2006-2007 transitional phase.

=== RTP Mundo ===
Final logo as RTP Internacional, used from 2016 to 29 March 2026.

The name RTP Mundo was first suggested in an October 2011 Público opinion article. It implied the creation of the platform from the merger of both RTP Internacional and RTP África and that it would act as a co-production platform between "quality" international broadcasters (not just Lusophone). The Left Bloc's 2021 proposal for RTP also featured such a merger, under the same name (RTP Mundo).

The name wasn't unveiled to the public until March 2026, when the staff of both RTP Internacional (and its radio counterpart) feared for job losses as the two would be merged under the RTP Mundo name. A plenary was held on 18 March 2026, resulting in a unanimous vote among journalists oppose the plan to unify radio and television services under single brand and urging the immediate suspension of the plan. Nevertheless, the rebranding has been implemented on 30 March 2026.

== Distribution ==
=== Satellite ===
RTP Mundo is available across all of North America for free via Galaxy 19 and Intelsat 805.

=== Subscription television ===
It is also available as a pay service via Dish Network in the United States and Rogers Cable and NexTV (IPTV Platform) in Canada.

For years, the channel was carried in Australia and New Zealand via UBI World TV. In 2013, RTP Internacional returned to these countries via Luso Vision, which focuses on Portuguese, Brazilian and Chilean programming.

=== Terrestrial television ===
RTP Mundo programming is also retransmitted by Teledifusão de Macau (TDM) in Macao, through its Portuguese-language TV channel Canal Macau, and in East Timor (Timor Leste) by Radio e Televisão Timor Leste (RTTL), together with local broadcasts.

== Controversies ==
In 2017, the TV and radio service – RTP Internacional and RDP, respectively – of RTP, as well as the Portuguese news agency Lusa, were suspended from operating in Guinea-Bissau. The measure was announced by Bissau-Guinean minister for the media, Vítor Pereira. He justified the decision with end of the contracts with RTP and Lusa. The Portuguese government considered the decision to be "unacceptable" and an "attack on freedom of expression, while Reporters Without Borders condemned that same decision. Lusa was eventually allowed to operate in the country, but RTP Internacional and RDP were not.
