= K League 1 =

Association football league in South Korea

- Organising body: K League Federation
- Founded: 1983; 43 years ago
- Country: South Korea
- Confederation: AFC
- Number of clubs: 12
- Level on pyramid: 1
- Relegation to: K League 2
- Domestic cup(s): Korea Cup; K League Super Cup
- International cup(s): AFC Champions League Elite; AFC Champions League Two
- Current champions: FC Seoul (7th title) (2026)
- Most championships: Jeonbuk Hyundai Motors (10 titles)
- Broadcasters: JTBC Sports; IB Sports; ENA Sports; Coupang Play; Next Level Sports
- Website: kleague.com
- Current: 2026 K League 1

The K League 1 (Korean: K리그1) is a professional association football league in South Korea and the highest level of the South Korean football league system. The league is contested by twelve clubs. It is one of the most successful leagues in the Asian Football Confederation, with its past and present clubs having won a record twelve AFC Champions League titles.

== History ==
The South Korean professional football league was founded in 1983 as the Korean Super League, with five member clubs. The initial five clubs were Hallelujah FC, Yukong Elephants, Pohang Steelworks, Daewoo Royals, and Kookmin Bank. Hallelujah FC won the inaugural title, finishing one point ahead of Daewoo Royals to lift the trophy.

The Super League was renamed the Korean Professional Football League, and introduced the home and away system in 1987. It was once again renamed the K League in 1998. After the 2011 season, the K League Championship and the Korean League Cup were abolished, and the league was split into two divisions in 2013. The first division was named the K League Classic, while the newly created second division was named the K League Challenge, and both are now part of the K League structure. Since its creation, the league has expanded from an initial 5 to 26 clubs. Of the five inaugural clubs, only Yukong, Pohang and Daewoo still compete in the K League; Kookmin Bank dropped out of the league at the end of 1984, and Hallelujah in the following season.

On 22 January 2018, the top-flight competition was renamed as K League 1.

== Structure ==
In 2011, the league announced a plan to introduce a relegation system from the 2012 season, when two teams were relegated. In 2013, the bottom two teams were directly relegated, while the 12th team played a relegation playoff match against the winner of the newly formed K League Challenge. From the 2013 season, as the number of teams in K League was reduced, only the 12th team is automatically relegated, with the 10th and 11th-placed teams contesting a promotion-relegation play-offs against K League 2 teams.

The league also introduced a split system in the 2012 season, where each club plays each other three times in the regular round, then the top and bottom six teams are split into Split A and Split B, in which a team plays every other team in the split once, to decide the final standings.

== Other information ==
The K League season typically begins around March and runs to late November each year. The number of games, clubs and the systems used have varied through the years.

A number of the member clubs are owned by South Korean major conglomerates "chaebols". Those clubs have adopted local city names in an effort to integrate themselves more with the local communities. All other teams are owned by local governments.

The K League champions, runners-up, and third-placed team gain entry to the AFC Champions League the following season, with the exception of Sangmu FC due to their unique status as a military team. If the winners of Korean FA Cup cannot qualify for the AFC Champions League or already qualified for it, fourth place also can participate.

In the 2009 season, Gangwon FC joined the K League as its 15th member club. As such, the K League had one or more clubs in each province of South Korea. This was the first time in domestic South Korean professional sports history that there has been at least one club in each province.

== Current clubs ==
Club	Location	Stadium	First season	Current spell	Seasons (Note: As of the start of the 2026 season.)	Last title
FC Anyang	Anyang	Anyang Stadium	2025	2025–	2	—
Bucheon FC 1995	Bucheon	Bucheon Stadium	2026	2026–	1	—
Daejeon Hana Citizen	Daejeon	Daejeon World Cup Stadium	1997	2023–	22	—
Gangwon FC	Gangwon	Chuncheon Songam Stadium; Gangneung Stadium	2009	2017–	15	—
Gimcheon Sangmu	Gimcheon	Gimcheon Stadium	2022	2024–	4	—
Gwangju FC	Gwangju	Gwangju World Cup Stadium	2011	2023–	11	—
Incheon United	Incheon	Incheon Football Stadium	2004	2026–	22	—
Jeju SK	Jeju Province	Jeju World Cup Stadium	1983	2021–	43	1989
Jeonbuk Hyundai Motors	North Jeolla	Jeonju World Cup Stadium	1995	1995–	32	2025
Pohang Steelers	Pohang	Pohang Steel Yard	1983	1983–	44	2013
FC Seoul	Seoul	Seoul World Cup Stadium	1984	1984–	43	2026
Ulsan HD	Ulsan	Ulsan Munsu Football Stadium	1984	1984–	43	2024

Locations of the 2026 K League 1 teams in the Seoul metropolitan area
Location of the 2026 K League 1 teams

== Champions ==
=== Champions by season ===
Season	Champions	Runners-up
1983	Hallelujah FC	Daewoo Royals
1984	Daewoo Royals	Yukong Elephants
1985	Lucky-Goldstar Hwangso	POSCO Atoms
1986	POSCO Atoms	Lucky-Goldstar Hwangso
1987	Daewoo Royals	POSCO Atoms
1988	POSCO Atoms	Hyundai Horang-i
1989	Yukong Elephants	Lucky-Goldstar Hwangso
1990	Lucky-Goldstar Hwangso	Daewoo Royals
1991	Daewoo Royals	Hyundai Horang-i
1992	POSCO Atoms	Ilhwa Chunma
1993	Ilhwa Chunma	LG Cheetahs
1994	Ilhwa Chunma	Yukong Elephants
1995	Ilhwa Chunma	Pohang Atoms
1996	Ulsan Hyundai Horang-i	Suwon Samsung Bluewings
1997	Busan Daewoo Royals	Jeonnam Dragons
1998	Suwon Samsung Bluewings	Ulsan Hyundai Horang-i
1999	Suwon Samsung Bluewings	Busan Daewoo Royals
2000	Anyang LG Cheetahs	Bucheon SK
2001	Seongnam Ilhwa Chunma	Anyang LG Cheetahs
2002	Seongnam Ilhwa Chunma	Ulsan Hyundai Horang-i
2003	Seongnam Ilhwa Chunma	Ulsan Hyundai Horang-i
2004	Suwon Samsung Bluewings	Pohang Steelers
2005	Ulsan Hyundai Horang-i	Incheon United
2006	Seongnam Ilhwa Chunma	Suwon Samsung Bluewings
2007	Pohang Steelers	Seongnam Ilhwa Chunma
2008	Suwon Samsung Bluewings	FC Seoul
2009	Jeonbuk Hyundai Motors	Seongnam Ilhwa Chunma
2010	FC Seoul	Jeju United
2011	Jeonbuk Hyundai Motors	Ulsan Hyundai
2012	FC Seoul	Jeonbuk Hyundai Motors
2013	Pohang Steelers	Ulsan Hyundai
2014	Jeonbuk Hyundai Motors	Suwon Samsung Bluewings
2015	Jeonbuk Hyundai Motors	Suwon Samsung Bluewings
2016	FC Seoul	Jeonbuk Hyundai Motors
2017	Jeonbuk Hyundai Motors	Jeju United
2018	Jeonbuk Hyundai Motors	Gyeongnam FC
2019	Jeonbuk Hyundai Motors	Ulsan Hyundai
2020	Jeonbuk Hyundai Motors	Ulsan Hyundai
2021	Jeonbuk Hyundai Motors	Ulsan Hyundai
2022	Ulsan Hyundai	Jeonbuk Hyundai Motors
2023	Ulsan Hyundai	Pohang Steelers
2024	Ulsan HD	Gangwon FC
2025	Jeonbuk Hyundai Motors	Daejeon Hana Citizen
2026	FC Seoul	

=== Performance by club ===
In accordance with the official K League policy, the current clubs inherit the history and records of the predecessor clubs.

Club	Champions	Runners-up	Seasons won
Jeonbuk Hyundai Motors	10	3	2009, 2011, 2014, 2015, 2017, 2018, 2019, 2020, 2021, 2025
FC Seoul	7	5	1985, 1990, 2000, 2010, 2012, 2016, 2026
Seongnam Ilhwa Chunma	7	3	1993, 1994, 1995, 2001, 2002, 2003, 2006
Ulsan HD	5	10	1996, 2005, 2022, 2023, 2024
Pohang Steelers	5	5	1986, 1988, 1992, 2007, 2013
Suwon Samsung Bluewings	4	4	1998, 1999, 2004, 2008
Busan Daewoo Royals	4	3	1984, 1987, 1991, 1997
Jeju United	1	5	1989
Hallelujah FC	1	0	1983

== Broadcasters ==
=== South Korea ===
Broadcaster	Summary	Ref.
JTBC Sports	Broadcast most matches live.	
ENA Sports	Broadcast one match live on every Saturday and Sunday respectively.	
IB Sports	Broadcast one match live on every Saturday.	
KBS1 (terrestrial)	Broadcast one match on every Sunday from 1:00 a.m.	
Coupang Play	Broadcast all the matches live on over-the-top media service.	

=== Outside South Korea ===
As of 2026

Country/region	Broadcaster
Unsold markets	K League TV
Australia	Stan Sport
China	K-Ball
CIS (Note: Includes Armenia, Azerbaijan, Belarus, Kazakhstan, Kyrgyzstan, Moldova, Russia, Tajikistan, Turkmenistan, and Uzbekistan.)	TV Start
Hong Kong	TVB
Macau	Macau Cable TV
Vietnam	Viettel

== See also ==
- K League records and statistics
- List of foreign K League 1 players
