= Bahleh =

Village in West Azerbaijan province, Iran

Bahleh Persian: بهله
- Village
- Location within Iran
- Coordinates: 37°57′00″N 44°54′44″E
- Country: Iran
- Province: West Azerbaijan
- County: Urmia
- District: Anzal
- Rural District: Anzal-e Jonubi

Population (2016)
  - Total: 683
- Time zone: UTC+3:30 (IRST)

Bahleh (Persian: بهله) (Note: Also romanized as Bahlah; also known as Pahleh) is a village in Anzal-e Jonubi Rural District of Anzal District in Urmia County, West Azerbaijan province, Iran.

== Demographics ==
=== Population ===
At the time of the 2006 National Census, the village's population was 751 in 120 households. The following census in 2011 counted 756 people in 164 households. The 2016 census measured the population of the village as 683 people in 171 households.
