= Macaw (disambiguation) =

Macaws are a group of New World parrot. The term may also refer to:

- Macaw palm, Acrocomia aculeata, a palm tree
- Multiple Access with Collision Avoidance for Wireless (MACAW)

== See also ==
- Macau (disambiguation)
- McCaw (surname)
