= Maku Kandi =

Village in West Azerbaijan province, Iran

Maku Kandi Persian: ماکوکندی
- Village
- Location within Iran
- Coordinates: 37°49′21″N 45°02′09″E
- Country: Iran
- Province: West Azerbaijan
- County: Urmia
- District: Anzal
- Rural District: Anzal-e Jonubi

Population (2016)
  - Total: 708
- Time zone: UTC+3:30 (IRST)

Maku Kandi (Persian: ماکوکندی) (Note: Also romanized as Mākū Kandī) is a village in Anzal-e Jonubi Rural District of Anzal District in Urmia County, West Azerbaijan province, Iran.

== Demographics ==
=== Population ===
At the time of the 2006 National Census, the village's population was 593 in 125 households. The following census in 2011 counted 657 people in 171 households. The 2016 census measured the population of the village as 708 people in 178 households.
