= Qushchi =

City in West Azerbaijan province, Iran

Qushchi Persian: قوشچی
- City
- Location within Iran
- Coordinates: 37°59′31″N 45°02′13″E
- Country: Iran
- Province: West Azerbaijan
- County: Urmia
- District: Anzal

Population (2016)
  - Total: 2,787
- Time zone: UTC+3:30 (IRST)

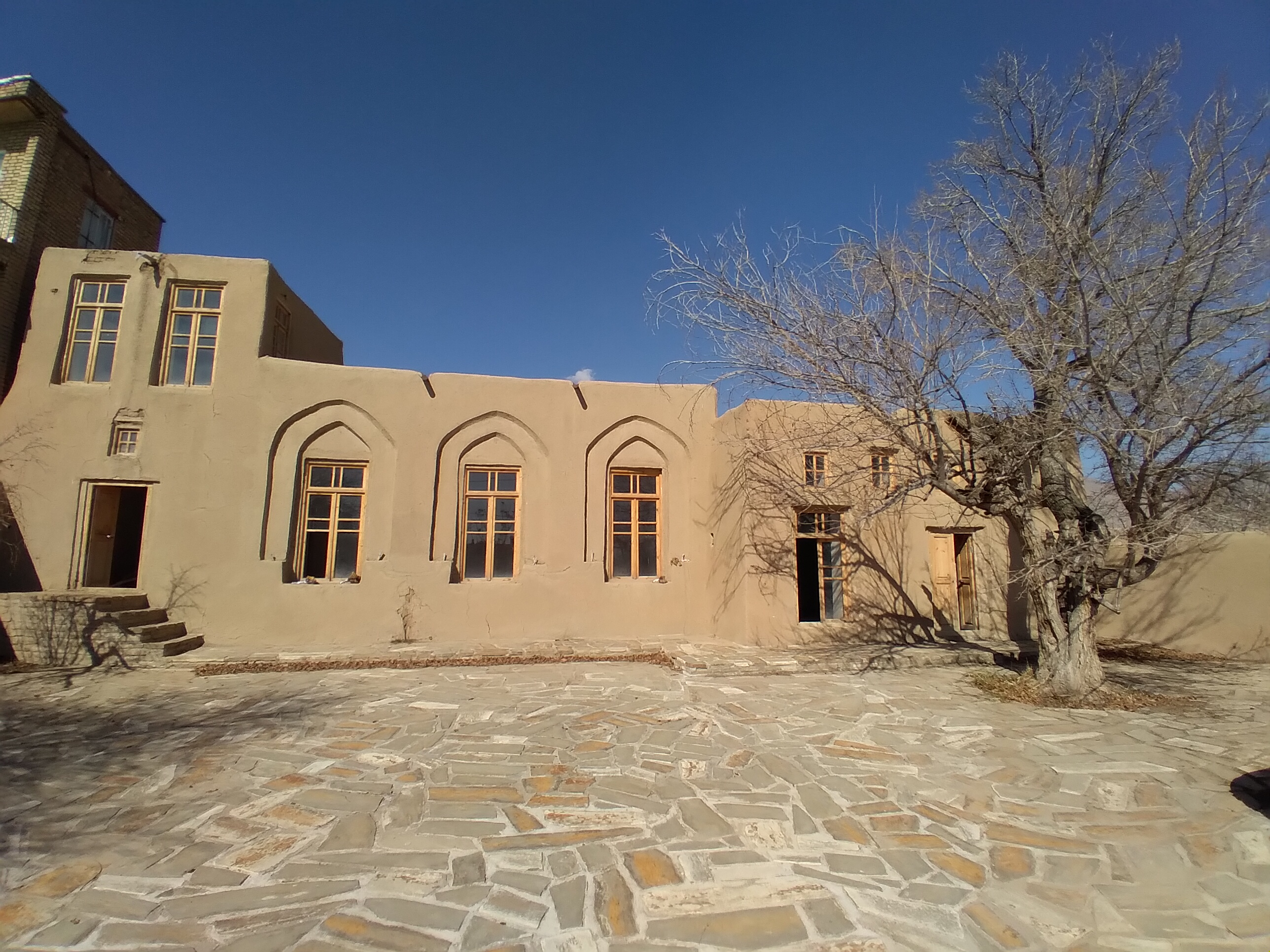

Qushchi (Persian: قوشچی) (Note: Also romanized as Qūshchī; also known as Ghoshchi, Gūchi, and Kushi) is a city in, and the capital of, Anzal District of Urmia County, West Azerbaijan province, Iran. It was the administrative center for Anzal-e Shomali Rural District until its capital was transferred to the village of Qarah Bagh.

== Demographics ==
=== Population ===
At the time of the 2006 National Census, the city's population was 2,832 in 828 households. The following census in 2011 counted 2,526 people in 844 households. The 2016 census measured the population of the city as 2,787 people in 935 households.
