= Macou =

Macou may refer to:

- Îlet Macou, an island in Guadeloupe
- Macou Prospect, one of the Sixes mines in Georgia, United States

== See also ==
- Pape Macou Sarr (born 1991), Senegalese footballer
- Macu (disambiguation)
- Macau (disambiguation)
