= St. John Church, Gavelan =

Ancient Assyrian church near Urmia, Iran

St. John Church
- کلیسای مار یوخنه
- Location within Iran

Religion
- Affiliation: Assyrian Church of the East

Location
- Location: Gavelan, Urmia, West Azarbaijan Province, Iran
- Interactive map of St. John Church
- Coordinates: 37.952297313611936°N 44.99139986965812°E

Architecture
- Type: Church
- Groundbreaking: 5th century

St. John Church (Persian: کلیسای مار یوخنه; Imperial Aramaic: ܩܕܝܫܬܐ ܡܪܝ ܝܘܿܚܲܢܵܢ) is an ancient Assyrian church located in Gavelan between Urmia and Salmas, Iran.

The existing structureseems to have been built in the 5th century. It is built on top a hill close to Gavelan village out of local rubble. The church has a simple rectangular plan with no decorations.

== See also ==
- Iranian Assyrians
