= Macau Satellite Television =

Private television network in Macau

Macau Satellite TV (澳门卫视), also known as MSTV, is a private television network in Macau. As of 2014, it operated seven television channels.

== History ==
MSTV was established in 1998 as Cosmos Televisão por Satélite, S.A.R.L, with shareholders from Macau, mainland China and Portugal. The MSTV channel began operations on 22 June 1999, in an investment worth 90 million patacas. The company's aim was to surpass the borders of social, cultural and religious systems, with the creation of several television channels. In the pilot phase, MSTV had seven channels. In 2004, the length of the news bulletin was of 20 minutes, airing four times a day on the main channel. MSTV financed the construction of Macau Asia Satellite Television in 2001. A long-term lease on AsiaSat-2 was signed in 2002.

As of 2005, when it got SARFT approval for the mainland, MSTV had three channels. The first channel was devoted to tourism. In July 2001, it launched EAST (East Asia Satellite Television), with extensive financing and even had an office in Hong Kong, as well as the Tung Ya Cinema studio in Macau for program production. However, on 1 April 2008, due to financial issues, the channel closed.

In October 2009, according to reports, MSTV complained TDM's usage of a similar name for its satellite channel. This prompted the broadcaster to change the name of TDM's channel to Ou Mun-MACAU to avoid confusion.
