= Fujian Renmin Guangbo Diantai =

Radio station in Fujian, China

Coordinates: 26.07667°N 119.30336°E

- Traditional Chinese: 福建人民廣播電臺
- Simplified Chinese: 福建人民广播电台
Transcriptions
Standard Mandarin
- Hanyu Pinyin: Fújiàn Rénmín Guǎngbō Diàntái
Yue: Cantonese
- Jyutping: Fuk^{1}gin^{3} Jan^{4}man^{4} Gwong^{2}bo^{3} Din^{6}toi^{4}

Fujian Renmin Guangbo Diantai, (Chinese: 福建人民广播电台) translated as "Fujian People's Broadcasting Station", is a radio station group from Fujian, China. It is part of the Fujian Radio Film and TV Group conglomerate. Its radio broadcasts have been directed into Taiwan, which have been described as being part of united front efforts.

== See also ==
- Fujian Radio Film and TV Group
