= Macu =

Macu or MACU may refer to:

- Macu, the name of several ethnic groups and languages of South America
- Macu, The Policeman's Woman, a 1987 Venezuelan film
- Mid-Atlantic Christian University, in North Carolina, United States
- Mid-America Christian University, in Oklahoma, United States
- Mountain America Credit Union, in Utah, United States

== See also ==
- Maccu, a Sicilian soup
- Macou (disambiguation)
- Maku (disambiguation)
