= Gurchin Qaleh =

Village in West Azerbaijan province, Iran

Gurchin Qaleh Persian: گورچين قلعه
- Village
- Location within Iran
- Coordinates: 38°03′43″N 45°10′08″E
- Country: Iran
- Province: West Azerbaijan
- County: Urmia
- District: Anzal
- Rural District: Anzal-e Shomali

Population (2016)
  - Total: 352
- Time zone: UTC+3:30 (IRST)

Gurchin Qaleh (Persian: گورچين قلعه) (Note: Also romanized as Govarchīn Qal‘eh and Gūrchīn Qal‘eh; also known as Gauharchīn Qal‘eh, Goorchin Ghal‘eh, Gūvarchīn Qal‘eh, and Gyuarchinkala) is a village in Anzal-e Shomali Rural District of Anzal District in Urmia County, West Azerbaijan province, Iran.

== Demographics ==
=== Population ===
At the time of the 2006 National Census, the village's population was 598 in 194 households. The following census in 2011 counted 444 people in 166 households. The 2016 census measured the population of the village as 352 people in 151 households.
