= Arrow Emblem: Hawk of the Grand Prix =

Japanese anime television series

- Screenshot from the television series
- アローエンブレム・グランプリの鷹
- Genre: Drama, Sports
- Created by: Kogo Hotomi
- Written by: Masaki Tsuji; Keisuke Fujikawa; Shozo Uehara
- Directed by: Rintaro (1st part); Nobutaka Nishizawa (2nd part)
- Music by: Hiroshi Miyagawa
- Country of origin: Japan
- Original language: Japanese
- No. of episodes: 44

Production
- Production companies: Fuji Television; Toei Animation

Original release
- Network: FNS (Fuji TV)
- Release: September 22, 1977 – August 31, 1978

Arrow Emblem: Hawk of the Grand Prix (アローエンブレム・グランプリの鷹, Arō Enburemu Guranpuri no Taka) is an anime series aired from 1977 to 1978 in Japan. There are 44 episodes aired at 25 minutes each. It is also known as "Arrow Emblem Grand Prix no Taka". In the United States, it was re-edited to a short movie called "Super Grand Prix".

== Original story ==
The story is about a young man named Takaya Todoroki who dreams of becoming a F1 racer. He puts all his energy into winning a beginners heat in stock cars, but slips on oil when in the lead due to a momentary loss of focus and has an accident. This makes Takaya lose his confidence and initially swear to give up racing. Then a masked stranger appears by his bedside in the hospital who introduced himself as the world-famous driver "Nick" (Niki Lauda in other languages). He encourages him to dust himself off and try driving a new prototype. Before long, he is a team member of "Katori Motors", hoping to become a world F1 champion, driving the "Todoroki special", a car built to his own design.

== Production notes ==
The show's Japanese name "Grand Prix no taka" translates as "Hawk of Grand Prix", a theme that often recurs in the opening animation. The main character's name was probably chosen to suit this theme as well.

In the US the 44-episode series was significantly shortened to form a 90-minute movie for children called "Super Grand Prix" released by Liberty International on August 12, 2003. The story is essentially the same, except Takaya is now known as "Sean Corrigan" and nicknamed "Crash Corrigan" for the crash.

== Cast ==
- Kei Tomiyama as Takaya Todoroki
- Hidekatsu Shibata as Daisaku Kuruma
- Kan Tokumaru as Nick Lauda
- Keiichi Noda as Masaru Ōhinata
- Kenichi Ogata as Sasaki
- Kōji Yada as Narrator
- Mami Koyama as Suzuko Ōse
- Masako Nozawa as Hangorō Ōse
- Rihoko Yoshida as Rie Katori
- Yasuo Hisamatsu as Gōichirō Katori

== Staff ==
- Creator: Kogo Hotomi
- Planning: Kenji Yokoyama, Koji Bessho, Takeshi Tamiya
- Chief Directors: Rintaro, Nobutaka Nishizawa
- Additional Directors: Nobutaka Nishizawa, Yugo Serikawa, Takenori Kawada, Yasuo Yamayoshi, Katsutoshi Sasaki, Rintaro, Osamu Kasai, Susumu Ishizaki, Tokiji Kaburagi
- Screenwriters: Masaki Tsuji, Keisuke Fujikawa, Shozo Uehara
- Original Character Designer: Akio Sugino
- Animation Character Designers: Kenzo Koizumi, Takuo Noda
- Mechanical Concept Designer: Dan Kobayashi
- Art Designers: Tadanao Tsuji, Mukuo Takamura
- Animation Directors: Bunpei Nanjo, Eiji Kamimura, Takeshi Shirato, Toshio Mori, Kazuo Komatsubara, Kenzo Koizumi, Sadayoshi Tominaga, Takuo Noda
- Music: Hiroshi Miyagawa
- Theme Song Performance: Ichiro Mizuki
- Production: Fuji TV, Toei Animation

== Home media ==
There are 2 DVD releases for the series, a 4 disc set and a 5 disc set.

== Merchandise ==
There were a number of Arrow Emblem race cars released under the Popynica toyline by Popy Pleasure in 1978 and 1979.

PB-34 Todoroki Special

PB-35 Todoroki Special, mark 2

PB-36 Todoroki Special, mark 3

PB-37 DX Todoroki Special

PB-38 Katori Super Roman

PB-39 Katori Rally Version

PB-40 DX Katori Super Roman

PB-41 Anchor

PB-44 DX Anchor

PB-45 Countach LP500S

Aside from these model cars, Popy also made a 1:1 scale racing helmet which could be worn by children. Unfortunately the serial number for this helmet is unknown.

References to two other pieces of merchandise have been found:

- A slotracing track, created by Bandai.
- A garage kit of the Todoroki Special, created by Club M

== Trivia ==
- It was aired every week Thursday 7:00 pm to 7:30 pm.
- The character Nick is evidently based on Austrian world champion F1 driver Niki Lauda. While Nick is only referred to as "Masked Man" (due to the mask he wears) in the English dub 'Super Grand Prix', the character does specifically mention the name Lauda during the flashback sequence in which he is discussing his own past.
- Apart from Lauda, the series also featured other thinly disguised popular Formula One drivers from the 1970s, including Mario Andretti, Vittorio Brambilla, Emerson Fittipaldi, James Hunt, Clay Regazzoni and Jody Scheckter.
- The design of the 'Todoroki Special' was inspired by the 1976 Tyrrell P34 'six wheeler' designed by Derek Gardner.
