= Yasuo Hisamatsu =

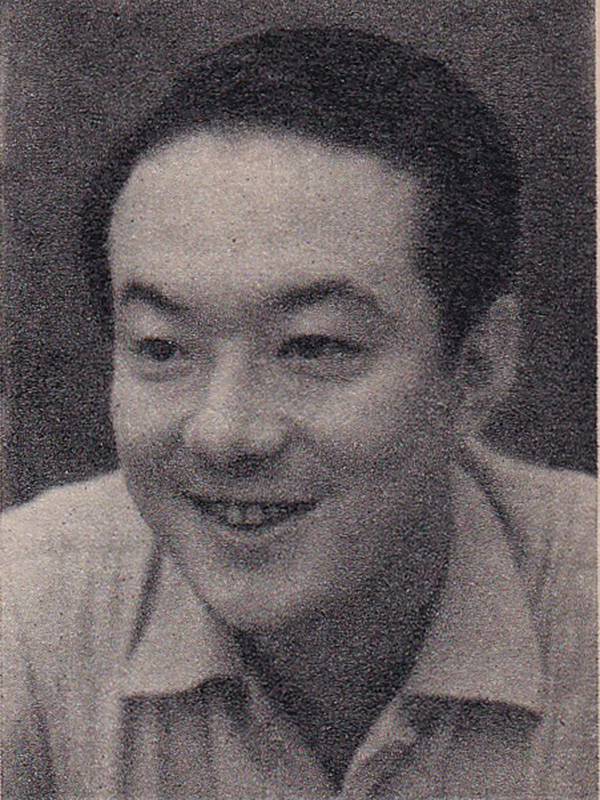
Yasuo Hisamatsu

Yasuo Hisamatsu (6 June 1919 – 15 June 1982) was a Japanese actor, voice actor, television executive, and educator. In 1959 he was made director of the Pacific Television Corporation. He was the first president of the Seiji Juku; a school for actors in Tokyo that was founded by Aoni Production. Some of his credits include the roles of Antares in Galaxy Express 999 and its film adaptation, Quincy Harker in The Tomb of Dracula, Narrator in Arrow Emblem: Hawk of the Grand Prix, Genzo Umon in Uchu Enban Daisenso, Merlin in King Arthur, Mihara in Lady from Hell, and Kajiwara's messenger in The Men Who Tread on the Tiger's Tail.
