= Southeast Television =

Chinese television network

- Country: People's Republic of China
- Broadcast area: Worldwide
- Headquarters: Fuzhou

Programming
- Language(s): Mandarin, Taiwanese, Hakka and Hokkien
- Picture format: 576i (SDTV) 4:3 (1994.1.1–2016.9); 576i (SDTV) 16:9 (2016.9–present); 1080i (HDTV) 16:9 (2015.7.2–present)

Ownership
- Owner: Fujian Media Group

History
- Launched: 1 January 1994; 31 years ago

Links
- Website: www.setv.com.cn

Southeast Television (SETV; Chinese: 东南卫视) formerly Fujian Television, is a television network in Fujian, China. It is part of the Fujian Media Group, which in itself is part of the Fujian Radio Film and TV Group conglomerate. SETV currently broadcasts in Mandarin, Taiwanese, Hakka, Fuzhounese and Hokkien.

== See also ==
- Fujian Radio Film and TV Group
