= TDM Ou Mun =

Broadcasting channel in Macau

TDM Ou Mun 澳視澳門
- Country: China
- Broadcast area: Macau; Guangdong (partially, from 15 August 2023); International

Programming
- Languages: Cantonese; Mandarin
- Picture format: 16:9 (HDTV)

Ownership
- Owner: TDM - Teledifusão de Macau, S. A.

History
- Launched: 17 September 1990
- Former names: TDM Chinese (澳廣視中文台)

Links
- Website: http://www.tdm.com.mo/

Availability

Terrestrial
- Digital: Variable by district

TDM Ou Mun (Chinese: 澳視澳門), formerly known as TDM Chinese (Chinese: 澳廣視中文台), owned by TDM - Teledifusão de Macau, S. A., is the first broadcasting channel in Macau. It is free-to-air, and in the Cantonese language. It is mainly focused on local news and informative programs such as "TDM News", "Macau Forum" and "Financial Magazine" etc. Also, it includes local living programs such as "Our people, our life" etc.

== History ==
It was the second television channel to be created in Macau in 1990, when the Portuguese-language programming remained on the exclusive channel, while the Cantonese-language programming spun-off to its own channel. TDM planned to create the channel in late 1987, with initial test broadcasts scheduled for January 1988. By broadcasting in Cantonese, it would also lure potential viewers in Hong Kong. The service would also attract the Hong Kong advertising market in line with its ban on tobacco advertising scheduled for 1990, but would cause concern from the Hong Kong government because viewers would be attracted to "dangerous" advertisements. In preparation for its launch, TDM's sole channel was broadcasting its Cantonese output from 07:00 to 21:00 between 1989 and 1990.

== Availability outside Macau ==
From 15 August 2023, TDM Ou Mun will also available to cable systems within the Pearl River Delta region of China, with a formal launch date of 1 October.

== See also ==
- TDM Macau
- Media of Macau
