= Shirakan, Silvaneh =

Shirakan شيركان
- Village
- Location within Iran
- Coordinates: 37°17′51″N 44°57′49″E
- Country: Iran
- Province: West Azerbaijan
- County: Urmia
- Bakhsh: Silvaneh
- Rural District: Margavar

Population (2006)
  - Total: 762
- Time zone: UTC+3:30 (IRST)
  - Summer (DST): UTC+4:30 (IRDT)

Shirakan (Persian: شيركان, also Romanized as Shīrakān) is a village in Margavar Rural District, Silvaneh District, Urmia County, West Azerbaijan Province, Iran. At the 2006 census, its population was 762, in 126 families.
