= Kani Shurik, Sumay-ye Beradust =

Kani Shurik كاني شوريك
- Village
- Location within Iran
- Coordinates: 37°39′57″N 44°44′48″E
- Country: Iran
- Province: West Azerbaijan
- County: Urmia
- Bakhsh: Sumay-ye Beradust
- Rural District: Beradust

Population (2006)
  - Total: 191
- Time zone: UTC+3:30 (IRST)
  - Summer (DST): UTC+4:30 (IRDT)

Kani Shurik (Persian: كاني شوريك, also Romanized as Kānī Shūrīk; also known as Kānī Sharak and Kānī Sharīk) is a village in Beradust Rural District, Sumay-ye Beradust District, Urmia County, West Azerbaijan Province, Iran. At the 2006 census, its population was 191, in 31 families.
