= Anzal-e Shomali Rural District =

Rural district in West Azerbaijan province, Iran

Anzal-e Shomali Rural District Persian: دهستان انزل شمالی
- Rural District
- Location within Iran
- Coordinates: 38°03′N 45°06′E
- Country: Iran
- Province: West Azerbaijan
- County: Urmia
- District: Anzal
- Established: 1987
- Capital: Qarah Bagh

Population (2016)
  - Total: 2,252
- Time zone: UTC+3:30 (IRST)

Anzal-e Shomali Rural District (Persian: دهستان انزل شمالی) is in Anzal District of Urmia County, West Azerbaijan province, Iran. Its capital is the village of Qarah Bagh. The rural district was previously administered from the city of Qushchi.

== Demographics ==
=== Population ===
At the time of the 2006 National Census, the rural district's population was 2,938 in 898 households. There were 2,598 inhabitants in 907 households at the following census of 2011. The 2016 census measured the population of the rural district as 2,252 in 814 households. The most populous of its eight villages was Qarah Bagh, with 1,130 people.

=== Other villages in the rural district ===
- Bari
- Gurchin Qaleh
- Jamalabad
- Moqitalu
- Najafabad
- Qalqachi
