= TDM (Macau) =

Public broadcaster in Macau

TDM - Teledifusão de Macau, S. A. 澳門廣播電視股份有限公司
- Type: TV and Radio (Public Service Broadcast)
- Country: China
- First air date: 13 May 1984
- Founded: Macau
- Official website: www.tdm.com.mo/en/

TDM - Teledifusão de Macau, S. A.
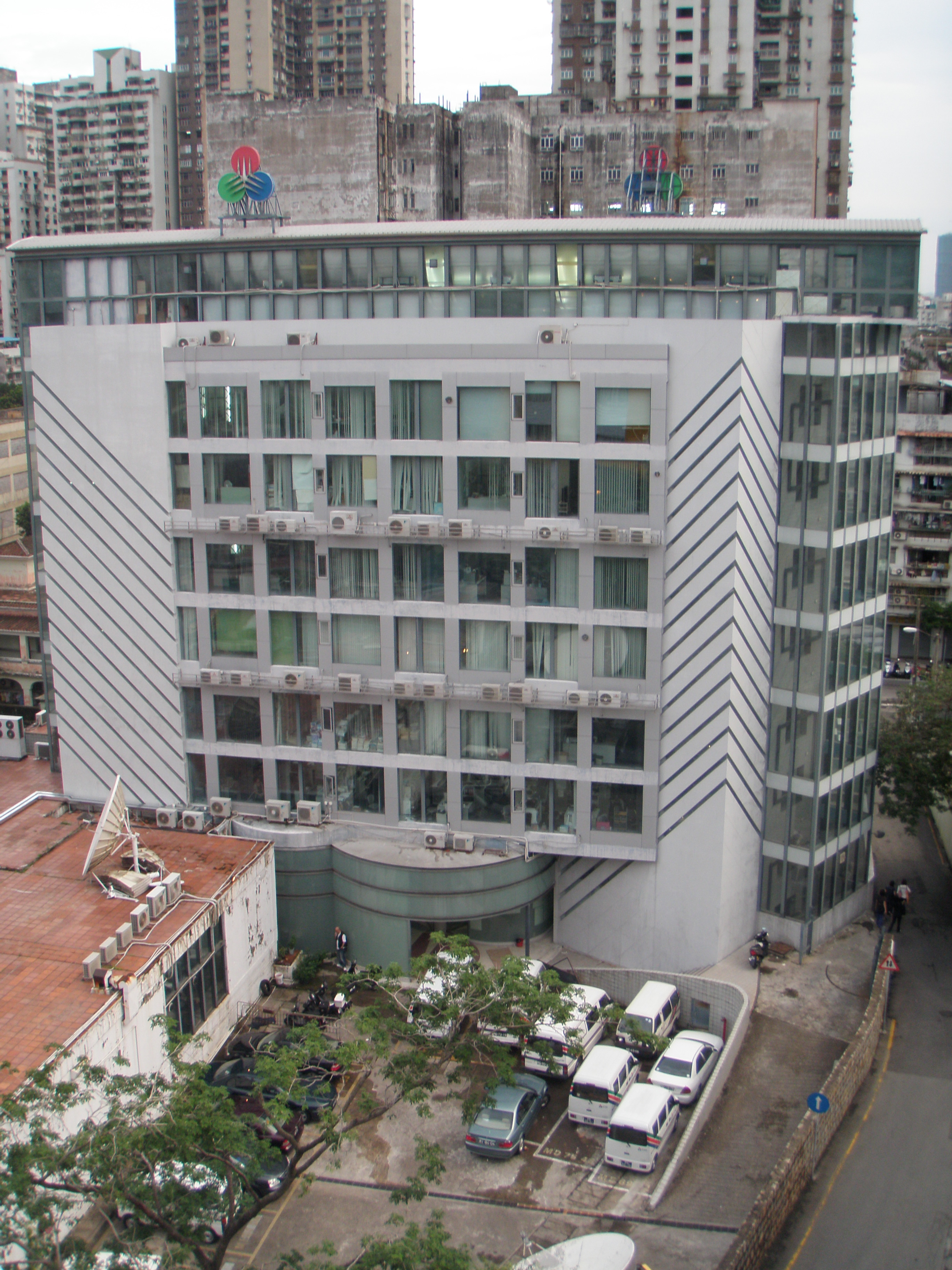
- TDM Headquarter at Rua de Francisco Xavier Pereira, Macau

Chinese name
- Traditional Chinese: 澳門廣播電視股份有限公司
- Simplified Chinese: 澳门广播电视股份有限公司
Transcriptions
Standard Mandarin
- Hanyu Pinyin: Àoměn Guǎngbō Diànshì Gǔfěn Yǒuxiàngōngsī
- Wade–Giles: Ao-men Kuang-po Tien-shih Ku-fen Yu-hsien-kung-ssŭ
Yue: Cantonese
- Jyutping: ou3 mun4 gwong2 bo3 din6 si6 gu2 fan6 yau3 haan6 gong1 si1
- IPA: [ʔōumʊ̏n kʷɔ̌ːŋpɔ̄ː tɪ̀nsìː kǔːfɐ̀n jɐ̄uhàːŋkɔ́ːŋsíː]

Portuguese name
- Portuguese: Teledifusão de Macau, S. A.

TDM - Teledifusão de Macau, S. A. (commonly abbreviated to TDM, Chinese: 澳門廣播電視股份有限公司) (Note: It does not have a (full) official English name; while it is sometimes translated as 'Macau Broadcasting Television Limited' or 'Macau Broadcasting Company', the short form 'TDM' is usually used, with the letters pronounced in English.) provides public broadcasting services in Macau. By running five digital terrestrial television channels, one satellite television channel and two radio channels, TDM provides local audiences with a wide range of content in Macau's two official languages, Chinese (Cantonese) and Portuguese, as well as having time-slots for English, Indonesian and Tagalog, which reflects the multicultural nature of the city, with 95 percent of the population being Chinese and five percent made up of Portuguese and other ethnic groups.

In the new media era, TDM has extended its services by developing multimedia platforms, including the official website (tdm.com.mo), mobile app (TDM App), social media and content-sharing platforms, allowing local and international audience instant access to information about Macau.

TDM transmits eight television channels from mainland China locally, including CCTV-1, CCTV-13, CGTN, CGTN Documentary, Strait Television, Hunan TV World, Southeast Television, and GDTV World.

== History ==
The history of TDM could be traced back to Rádio Macau which began broadcasting Portuguese news in August 1933. It was acquired by the Portuguese colonial government in 1948. In 1963, a Hong Kong businessman and the Japanese Pacific Television Corporation planned to create a terrestrial television station in Macau; it is unknown when and why it was shelved.

In 1979, the colonial government announced that it set up bids for a television station. Three companies were interested. TDM was founded in 1983, and as a public company, took over the control of the existing Rádio Macau stations and, from 13 May 1984, would begin its television broadcasts. TDM started broadcasting its television station on 13 May 1984, offering a mix of Portuguese and Cantonese programming between 18:00 and 23:00. It was the first television company to be founded in Macau, with news only being reported via radio broadcasts on stations such as Rádio Macau before they were absorbed into TDM.

The company was sold for 50 million patacas into a public-private partnership in 1988 following corruption scandals and major financial losses of up to 90 to 100 million patacas a year. In 1990, the Portuguese and Cantonese television operations were split into separate channels, granting each division its own autonomy. The company faced another round of financial difficulties in 2002 and was nearing closure; eventually the government bought back the shares of the company.

TDM ceased analogue transmission from 00:00 on 30 June 2023. TDM's international channel launched on NOS in Portugal on 13 May 2025, the day of the 41st anniversary of TDM's television broadcasts.

=== Self-censorship controversy ===
On 10 March 2021, in light of massive protests in neighbouring Hong Kong which were followed by the passage of national security legislation, TDM executives addressed the company on new broadcasting rules requiring the company to promote "patriotism, respect and love" for mainland China and withhold reports critical of the Chinese government. Several journalists have resigned from the broadcaster as a result of this conflict, with local journalist unions criticizing the rules as a breach of press freedom. Subsequently, the Portuguese Minister of Foreign Affairs Augusto Santos Silva warned them that press freedom is a part of Macao Basic Law, stating that the Portuguese government expects the law to be followed. Chief Executive of Macau Ho Iat-seng denied that press freedom restrictions were being imposed. Following the criticism, TDM's executives stated they would continue to follow their current editorial policy.

== Channels ==
Ch №	Channel	Channel content	Transmission	Launch Date	Website
=== Local channels ===
91	TDM Ou Mun	Free-to-air in Cantonese, first broadcasting channel of TDM	Digital	17 September 1990	Website
92	Canal Macau	Free-to-air in Portuguese and English	Digital	17 September 1990	Website
93	TDM Sport	Sports programmes	Digital	9 October 2009	Website
94	TDM Information	News and financial information programs	Digital	3 September 2012	Website
95	TDM Entertainment	Entertainment programmes	Digital	15 July 2008	Website
96	TDM Ou Mun Macau	International channel	Satellite	1 October 2009	Website
97	Rádio Macau	Broadcast TDM RADIO	Digital	16 February 2018	Website
=== Mainland channels ===
71	CCTV-1	Transmission of CCTV-1	Digital	20 December 2016	Website
72	CCTV-13	Live broadcast of CCTV-13	Digital	1 October 2009	Website
73	CGTN	Live broadcast of CGTN	Digital	15 July 2010	Website
74	CGTN Documentary	Live broadcast of CGTN Documentary	Digital	1 November 2011	Website
75	Strait Television	Live broadcast of FMG	Digital	1 April 2011	Website
76	Hunan TV World	Live broadcast of HBS	Digital	15 July 2010	Website
77	Southeast Television	Live broadcast of FMG	Digital	20 December 2017	Website
~~78~~	~~GDTV World~~	~~Live broadcast of GRT~~ (stopped broadcasting)	~~Digital~~	~~8 February 2018~~	~~Website~~
79	CCTV-5	Live broadcast of CCTV-5	Digital	17 December 2019	Website

== See also ==
- Media of Macau
