= Dar-e Maku =

Dar-e Maku درمكو
- Village
- Country: Iran
- Province: Hormozgan
- County: Rudan
- Bakhsh: Rudkhaneh
- Rural District: Rudkhaneh

Population (2006)
  - Total: 142
- Time zone: UTC+3:30 (IRST)

Dar-e Maku (Persian: درمكو, also Romanized as Dar-e Makū) is a village in Rudkhaneh Rural District, Rudkhaneh District, Rudan County, Hormozgan Province, Iran. At the 2006 census, its population was 142, in 26 families.
