= Jabalkandi, Urmia =

Jabalkandi جبل كندي
- Village
- Location within Iran
- Coordinates: 37°23′14″N 45°15′49″E
- Country: Iran
- Province: West Azerbaijan
- County: Urmia
- Bakhsh: Central
- Rural District: Torkaman

Population (2006)
  - Total: 404
- Time zone: UTC+3:30 (IRST)
  - Summer (DST): UTC+4:30 (IRDT)

Jabalkandi (Persian: جبل كندي, also Romanized as Jabalkandī) is a village in Torkaman Rural District, in the Central District of Urmia County, West Azerbaijan Province, Iran. At the 2006 census, its population was 404, in 119 families.
