= Maqu =

Maqu may refer to:

- Maqu County, a county in Gansu, China
- Maqu, Tibet
- Nimu Maqu River, a river in Nyêmo County, Lhasa Municipality, Tibet
