= Fujian Radio Film and TV Group =

Chinese mass media conglomerate

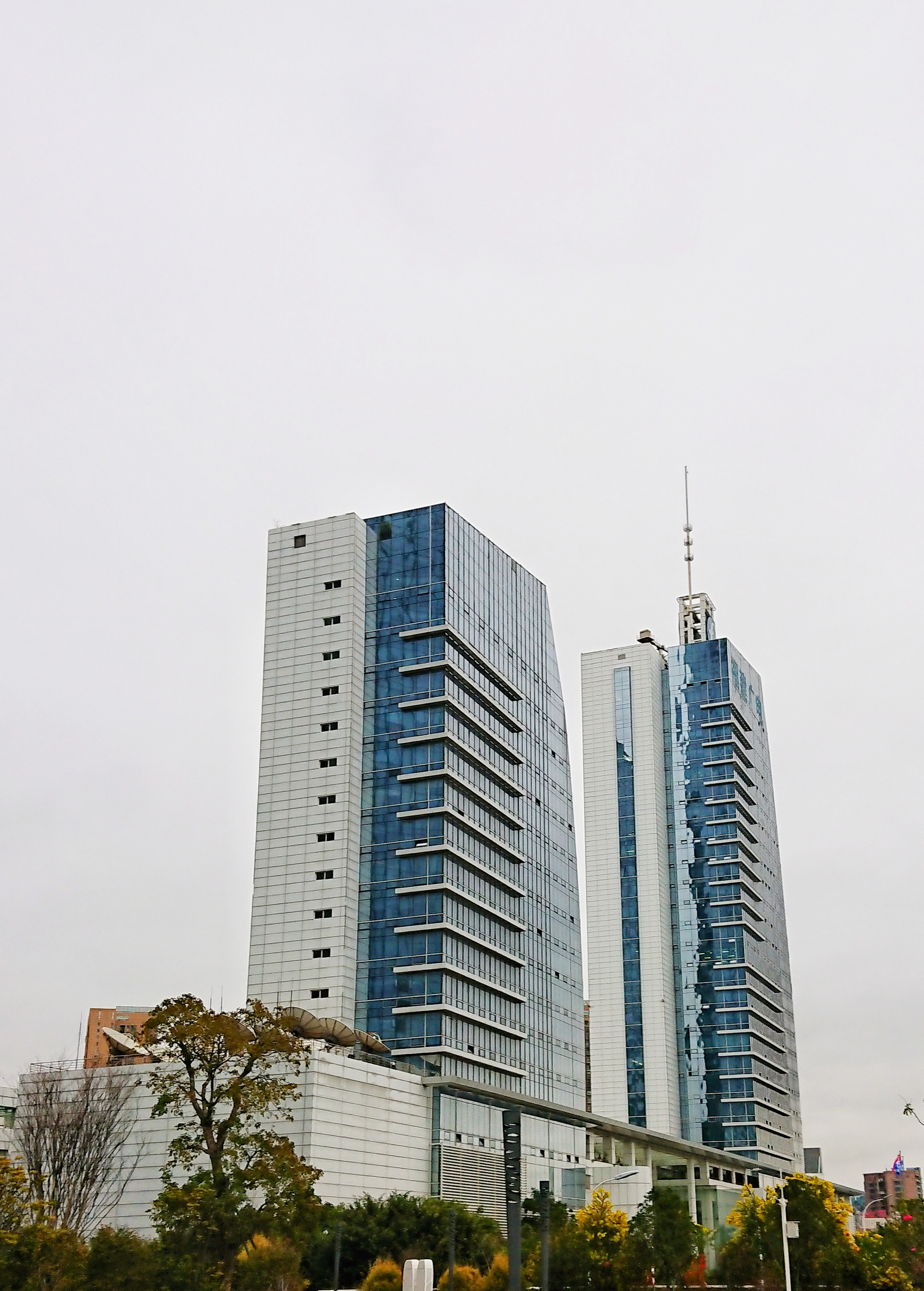
- Fijian Radio Film and TV Group headquarters
- Type: State media
- Country: China
- Founded: February 8, 2004
- Owner: Fujian Provincial People's Government
- Official website: www.fjtv.net

The Fujian Radio Film and TV Group, also known as the Fujian Media Group, is a state-owned conglomerate consisting of Southeast Television, the Fujian Renmin Guangbo Diantai, and Fujian Film Production. In 2023, the Fujian Media Group created an international communication center at the direction of the Fujian Provincial Committee of the Chinese Communist Party called the Fujian Taiwan, Hong Kong and Macao Communication Center (Chinese: 福建台港澳传播中心). Radio broadcasts from the group are directed into Taiwan, which have been described as being part of united front efforts.
