= Macau Cable TV =

Cable television provider in Macao

- Native name: 澳門有線電視
- Founded: 22 April 1999; 27 years ago in Portuguese Macau
- Headquarters: G/F , nº 77B, Avenida da Silva, Macau
- Area served: Macau
- Website: www.macaucabletv.com

Macau Cable Television Limited (Chinese: 澳門有線電視) is a cable television provider in Macao. Established in 1999, it began providing regular services in 2000.

== History ==
On 22 April 1999, following the creation of a Sino-Portuguese group, Macau Cable TV (TV Cabo Macau) was given a 15-year franchise to operate in the territory, becoming the exclusive provider of subscription television. The company received funds from Mainland China, Macao and Hong Kong, with Portugal Telecom, Teledifusão de Macau, Banco Nacional Ultramarino and Telesat - Comunicações por Satélite as shareholders, for a total investment of 450 million patacas. The management was up to PT's representants.

On 8 July 2000, Macau Cable TV began its service. In 2002, it had over 20,000 subscribers; by 2003, 40% of Macanese households were wired to its service.

Macau Cable TV launched a shopping channel (TV Mart) on 27 January 2005 and announced the launch of a new movie channel in Chinese on 3 February. At the time, its growth was hampered, having only little more than 20,000 subscribers out of a potential number of 120,000. This was mostly due to the fact that the number of illegal antenna users was still high.

In late February 2006, the company was finishing a triple-play project, following an agreement signed with SGC Telecom in December 2005. The move would enable MCTV to break CTM's ISP monopoly. PT announced the sale of its majority stake to local interests in December 2006, without identifying the buyer and amounts of money involved.

The company renewed its contract to operate in April 2019, valid until 2024. On 1 July 2019, the company started carrying EWTN's Asia-Pacific channel in its line-up, but was only made official on 15 August.
