= TDM Ou Mun Macau =

TDM Ou Mun Macau 澳門-MACAU
- Country: China
- Broadcast area: Macau; International

Programming
- Languages: Cantonese; Mandarin; Portuguese; English
- Picture format: 16:9 (HDTV)

Ownership
- Owner: TDM - Teledifusão de Macau, S. A.

History
- Launched: 1 October 2009
- Former names: TDM Satélite (澳廣視中文台)

Links
- Website: http://www.tdm.com.mo/

Availability

Terrestrial
- Digital: Channel 96

TDM Ou Mun Macao (Chinese: 澳門-MACAU) is a Macanese television channel owned by Teledifusão de Macau, aimed at an international audience. The channel is positioned as a platform for Macao, the greater Chinese region and the Lusophone countries.

== History ==
TDM announced in May 2009, coinciding with the 25th anniversary of the start of its television operations, that it would start a satellite channel by the end of the year. Before launch, the aim of the new channel was not entirely economical, but rather to bridge China to the Lusophone states. Not all of the content seen was going to be produced by TDM, as the channel was also being used as a platform for exchange with Lusophone broadcasters. The channel was set to be launched on Asiasat-2, then in 2010 to satellites in Europe and Africa, and in 2011 to the Americas.

In early November 2009, TDM changed the name of the channel to Ou Mun Macau/Canal Satélite, to prevent possible allusions to MSTV, another Macanese television network. Rumors emerged that MSTV received a letter of complaint to TDM, adverting the broadcaster in changing the channel's name.

In January 2012, TDM president Leong Kam Chan announced that it would launch the channel in mainland China within one year. The channel started being carried in Japan in 2017.

On 13 May 2025, the day of TDM's 41st anniversary, Ou Mun Macau was made available on Portuguese operator NOS. The channel also launched on TV Cabo Moçambique.

== See also ==
- TDM Macau
- Media of Macau
