= Pacific Television Corporation =

Japanese entertainment company

The Pacific Television Corporation (Japanese: 太平洋テレビジョン) was a Japanese distributor of international (primarily British and American) television series, who then redubbed them to the Japanese market.

== History ==
Founder Akira Shimizu was a sargeant who worked as an announcer for the Far East Network of the Armed Forces Network of the United States and was given the job of exporting Japanese animation to the United States and using the profits earned to import American television series to Japan. Shimizu approached the Educational Film Producers Federation and succeeded in acquiring a short animated film. When he sent it as a sample to a vendor in Los Angeles, he received an order for 20 copies and a purchase payment of $3,000.

This gave him confidence and he established East West Co., Ltd. (イースト・ウェスト株式会社) in Tamura-cho (now Nishi-Shinbashi). Shimizu sent letters to various American television companies, but it is said that almost no one answered to them. One of the companies that sent a rejection letter was NBC, and Shimizu, who learned about NBC from a friend, sent the letter again in order to make a connection with NBC. As a result, an executive at NBC became interested in Shimizu, investigating and testing him. Afterwards, Shimizu was given the job of secretary for foreign affairs to the Minister of Construction, Norio Nanjo, and when he went to the United States to negotiate on the expressway foreign currency loan issue, it was decided that he would go to NBC, but on the same day, he was appointed by John Locke. He asked John D. Rockefeller Jr. for advice on government negotiations, as a primary goal. On the day of his visit to Rockefeller Center, he was informed by Rockefeller that he would be late for his appointment, so he prioritized his appointment with NBC and headed home. When NBC's president learned that he had reneged on his promise to Rockefeller, he took a liking to Shimizu and appointed him his general agent in Japan.

After returning to Japan, Nanjo resigned as a minister, so he hired Nanjo and Masakazu Nagata as advisors, and moved the company to Yaesu. The name was changed to Pacific Television Corporation (太平洋テレビジョン株式会社).

Since 1957, the company has been producing Japanese dubs of TV series from around the world and distributing them to TV stations in Japan. In 1959, it concluded an exclusive contract with NBC in the United States. In partnership with National Telefilm Associates and the UK's BBC, Pacific Television handled the sales of NBC's Laramie, Bonanza, The Andy Williams Show, and NTA's The Sheriff of Cochise, among others. The company also provided overseas broadcasting rights for Japanese films, appointed film director Kozaburo Yoshimura as head of the film department, and produced television films. In July 1963, it teamed with a Hong Kong businessman for a possible terrestrial television station in Macau.

In 1959, Yasuo Hisamatsu was invited as director and entertainment manager, and around him, the company established an entertainment department with over 600 actors and 30 managers, and was positioned as a "TV entertainment-related agency". When starting the talent management business, they acquired several entertainment production companies with their talents.

In February 1960, a large-scale labor dispute broke out, which led to the talent agency staff and actors who left the company to form the Talent and Manager Club (TMC). It later became the Tokyo Actors' Consumer's Cooperative Association (Haikyo).

Pacific Television's president, Akira Shimizu, was arrested in 1962 on charges of tax evasion (violation of the corporate tax law), and the company and president Shimizu were indicted in 1964, but he was found not guilty in 1974. Shimizu then filed a lawsuit for compensation from the state, but lost, and the company was forced to close down during that time.
