= Macau Asia Satellite Television =

Television station in Macau

Macau Asia Satellite Television 澳門澳亞衛視
- Type: television network
- Country: China
- Availability: Macau, China, Hong Kong and Worldwide
- Broadcast area: Asia
- Launch date: 1 June 2001
- Official website: www.mastv.cc
- Language: Mandarin

Macau Asia Satellite Television (MASTV; Chinese: 澳亞衛視; pinyin: Àoyà Wèishì) is a television station located in Macau. It is known for its critical news coverage.

== History ==
The station was commenced and made its first broadcast on 1 June 2001. The channel received SARFT approval in 2002, among 28 other international channels. In 2004 the station hired Taiwan trained journalists to enhance its news coverage and analysis. On 1 June 2006, the channel was made available in Guangdong, becoming the ninth foreign channel available in the province.

On 16 July 2024, MASTV was declared bankrupt.

== Government raids ==
=== 2006 raid ===
In March 2006 the police raided the Macau Peninsula office for illegal workers. In that case, a suspected illegal worker was found, but the court found no evidence of illegal employment.

=== 2009 raid ===
In February 2009 labour officers raided the satellite transmission station in Coloane.

=== 2010 raid ===
At the end of the year in November 2009, one of the news show criticised the government for allowing an old hotel building to be redeveloped into a slot machine arcade. In February 2010 eight journalists were summoned for questioning.

On 18 March 2010 seven labour officers and six police officers raided the station. The government was searching for illegal workers from mainland China and raided the station. According to an editor, the raid took place at 6:30 pm right before the news broadcast. The journalists were questioned. He thought their critical coverage had offended the government and other powerful figures from the casino. But the government said the raid has nothing to do with the coverage. There were no illegal immigrants found.

Political columnists Anthony Wong dong said the raids targeted the station specifically. No other station has been searched in the past 10 years. The journalists from the station have reported many incidents of social injustice, including those related to labour issues.
