= Anzal-e Jonubi Rural District =

Rural district in West Azerbaijan province, Iran

Anzal-e Jonubi Rural District Persian: دهستان انزل جنوبي
- Rural District
- Location within Iran
- Coordinates: 37°54′N 44°57′E
- Country: Iran
- Province: West Azerbaijan
- County: Urmia
- District: Anzal
- Established: 1987
- Capital: Qulonji

Population (2016)
  - Total: 20,560
- Time zone: UTC+3:30 (IRST)

Anzal-e Jonubi Rural District (Persian: دهستان انزل جنوبي) is in Anzal District of Urmia County, West Azerbaijan province, Iran. Its capital is the village of Qulonji.

== Demographics ==
=== Population ===
At the time of the 2006 National Census, the rural district's population was 19,482 in 4,197 households. There were 20,605 inhabitants in 4,993 households at the following census of 2011. The 2016 census measured the population of the rural district as 20,560 in 5,076 households. The most populous of its 34 villages was Qulonji, with 5,192 people.

=== Other villages in the rural district ===
- Bahleh
- Gavlan
- Gol Tappeh
- Hammamlar
- Kahriz
- Maku Kandi
- Shahid Ab Shanasan Garrison
- Soltanabad
