= Anzal District =

District in West Azerbaijan province, Iran

Anzal District Persian: بخش انزل
- District
- Location within Iran
- Coordinates: 37°59′N 45°00′E
- Country: Iran
- Province: West Azerbaijan
- County: Urmia
- Capital: Qushchi

Population (2016)
  - Total: 25,599
- Time zone: UTC+3:30 (IRST)

Anzal District (Persian: بخش انزل) is in Urmia County, West Azerbaijan province, Iran. Its capital is the city of Qushchi.

== Demographics ==
=== Population ===
At the time of the 2006 National Census, the district's population was 25,252 in 5,923 households. The following census in 2011 counted 25,729 people in 6,744 households. The 2016 census measured the population of the district as 25,599 inhabitants in 6,825 households.

=== Administrative divisions ===
Anzal District Population
| Administrative Divisions | 2006 | 2011 | 2016 |
|---|---|---|---|
| Anzal-e Jonubi RD | 19,482 | 20,605 | 20,560 |
| Anzal-e Shomali RD | 2,938 | 2,598 | 2,252 |
| Qushchi (city) | 2,832 | 2,526 | 2,787 |
| Total | 25,252 | 25,729 | 25,599 |
RD = Rural District
