= List of French films of 2013 =

A list of films produced in France in 2013.

Title	Director	Cast	Genre	Notes
100% cachemire	Valérie Lemercier	Valérie Lemercier, Gilles Lellouche, Gérard Darmon	Comedy	IMDb
Angélique	Ariel Zeitoun	Nora Arnezeder	Adventure	
Artémis, cœur d'artichaut	Hubert Viel	Frédérique Barré, Noémie Rosset	Comedy	
Back in Crime	Germinal Alvarez	Jean-Hugues Anglade, Mélanie Thierry	Crime	
Bambi	Sébastien Lifshitz	Marie-Pierre Pruvot	Documentary	Winner of the 2013 Teddy Award for Best Documentary Film
Bastards	Claire Denis	Vincent Lindon	Drama	IMDb
Blue Is the Warmest Colour (La Vie d'Adèle)	Abdellatif Kechiche	Léa Seydoux, Adèle Exarchopoulos	Romance	IMDb
BoOzy' OS and the Cristal Gem	Julien Rocca-Darcin	Julien Rocca-Darcin, Georges Colazzo	Animation	IMDb
Bright Days Ahead	Marion Vernoux	Fanny Ardant, Laurent Lafitte, Patrick Chesnais	Romance	
Camille Claudel 1915	Bruno Dumont	Juliette Binoche	Drama	
The Conquerors (Les conquérants)	Xabi Molia	Mathieu Demy, Denis Podalydès, Christian Crahay	Comedy	IMDb
Grand Central	Rebecca Zlotowski	Léa Seydoux, Tahar Rahim	Romance	IMDb
It Boy	David Moreau	Virginie Efira, Pierre Niney	Romantic comedy	IMDb
Jappeloup	Christian Duguay	Guillaume Canet	Drama	IMDb
Michael Kohlhaas	Arnaud des Pallières	Mads Mikkelsen	Drama	IMDb
Möbius	Éric Rochant	Jean Dujardin	Thriller	IMDb
Mood Indigo	Michel Gondry	Romain Duris, Audrey Tautou		
Rock the Casbah	Laïla Marrakchi	Morjana Alaoui, Omar Sharif	Drama	IMDb
The Nun (La religieuse)	Guillaume Nicloux	Pauline Étienne, Isabelle Huppert	Drama	
On My Way (Elle s'en va)	Emmanuelle Bercot	Catherine Deneuve	Drama	
The Past (Le Passé)	Asghar Farhadi	Bérénice Bejo, Tahar Rahim	Mystery	IMDb
Stranger by the Lake	Alain Guiraudie	Pierre Deladonchamps	Drama	IMDb
The Tied (Une histoire d'amour)	Hélène Fillières	Benoît Poelvoorde	Drama	IMDb
Tip Top	Serge Bozon	Isabelle Huppert		
Venus in Fur (La Vénus à la fourrure)	Roman Polanski	Emmanuelle Seigner	Drama	IMDb
Young & Beautiful (Jeune & Jolie)	François Ozon	Marine Vacth, Charlotte Rampling, Géraldine Pailhas	Sex drama	
Chinese Puzzle (Casse-tête chinois)	Cédric Klapisch	Romain Duris, Audrey Tautou, Kelly Reilly, Cécile de France	Drama	IMDb
