= Fétiche =

French model and vedette (born 1935)

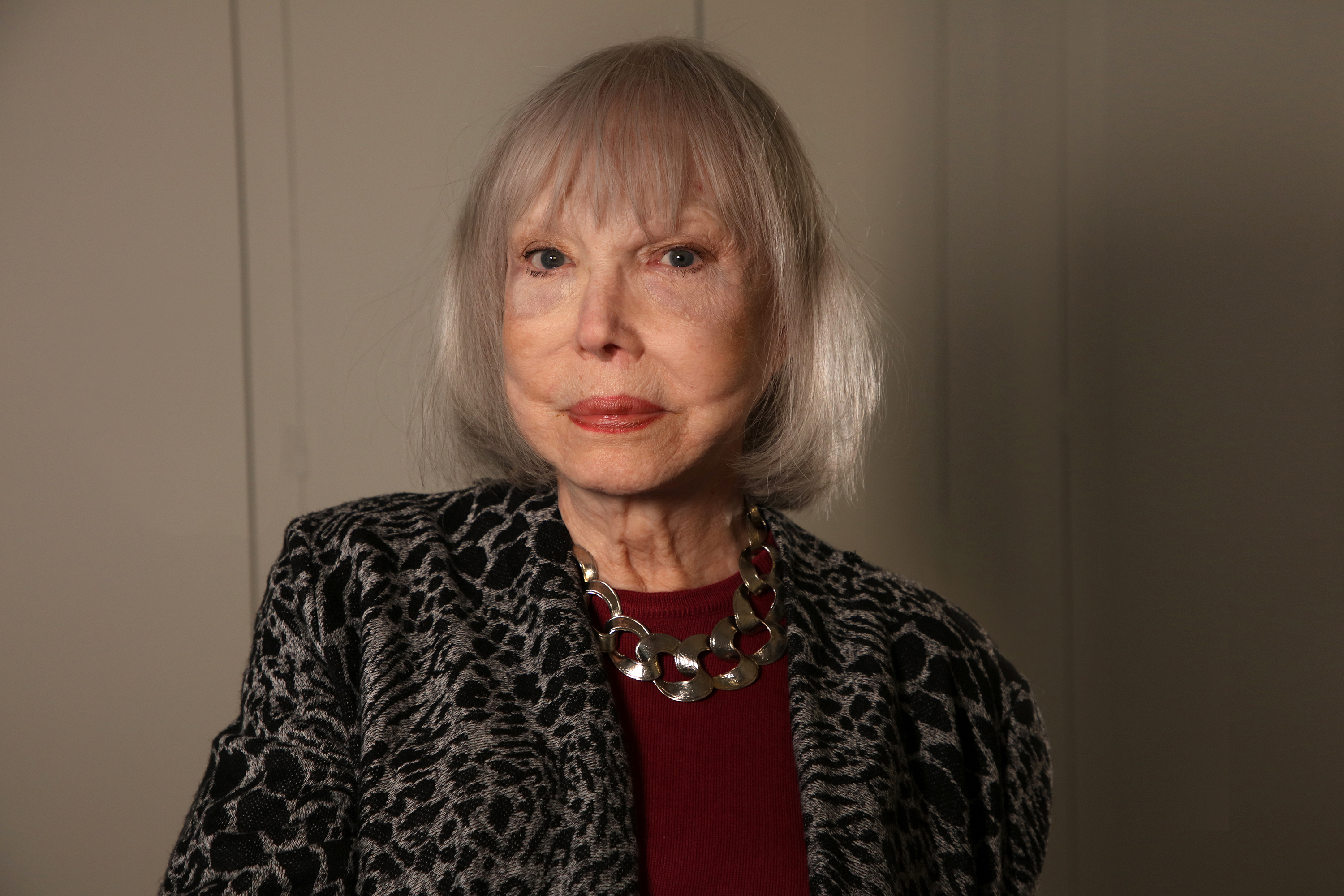
- Fétiche at the age of 90, photographed by Marc Martin
- Occupations: Showgirl, dancer, model
- Notable work: Fétiche par Fétiche (2025)

Fétiche is a French model and vedette. A trans woman, she had a career in cabaret in the 1950s and 1960s alongside trans performers such as Bambi, Capucine, and Coccinelle. She obtained a change of legal gender marker without having undergone sex reassignment surgery, thanks to the intervention of President François Mitterrand.

== Biography ==
Fétiche grew up in northern France and was assigned male at birth. Her father died when she was only 14. She contributed to the family expenses by working in a factory from a very young age, but she dreamed of becoming a singer.

Fétiche moved to Paris in 1956 and began her career at the Festival on Rue du Colisée with a singing performance, dressed as a boy. Following her encounter with Coccinelle and Bambi, she became a showgirl at the cabaret Madame Arthur and then Le Carrousel de Paris. She made history by becoming one of the first transgender models. She began modeling in 1961 for the avant-garde couturier Jacques Esterel, with contemporary press noting her defying the conventions of haute couture. She was featured on the front page of the daily newspaper Paris Jour on 19 April 1961, and embarked on a tour of Japan with the Carrousel de Paris troupe. After 30 years on stage and relocation of the cabaret in 1985, Fétiche moved into another field and worked in television production.

Pascal Sevran hired her for the production team of La Chance aux chansons and intervened with his friend François Mitterrand to help her obtain identity papers that matched her appearance. Invited to the Élysée Palace for the presentation of Legion of Honour to Pascal Sevran in 1991, Fétiche thanked the President of the Republic for allowing her to no longer be "outside the law". In 1999, she left television studios for Marianne Mélodie, a record label specializing in reissuing French songs, before retiring.

By the age of 90, Fétiche published her autobiography Fétiche par Fétiche, J'en ai tant vu at éditions Atlande with the help of Matthieu Moulin. To celebrate the event, the town hall of the 17th arrondissement of Paris – the arrondissement where she lives – organized a literary evening in her honor on 6 November 2025.

Since the release of her autobiography, Fétiche has been giving numerous interviews and has been reappraised as a pioneer of trans identity in France. In November 2025, she gave Maurine Charrier her first account of taking hormones and experiencing police repression for Têtu magazine. On 4 December 2025, the fashion magazine Antidote ran the headline "Fétiche by Fétiche: The Essential Memoirs of One of the First Trans Models in History." On 10 December 2025, at the Trianon in Paris, Fétiche was invited to the third "Têtu Awards Ceremony," which recognizes advances in LGBTQIA+ visibility and rights. Strobo magazine features "Fétiche, the pioneer who changed the lives of trans people!" in a five-page interview in its January 2026 issue. On 28 February 2026, and 8 March, Martin Pénet, a producer at Radio France, dedicated two "Tour de Chant" programs to her on France Musique, in which he retraced her career with her. Agnès Giard, a journalist at Libération, dedicated her column "Les 400 culs" on 22 March to her: "Fétiche, the pioneer of trans identities for whom Mitterrand amended a law".
