= The Lives of Thérèse =

- Film poster
- French: Les Vies de Thérèse
- Directed by: Sébastien Lifshitz
- Produced by: Muriel Meynard
- Starring: Thérèse Clerc
- Cinematography: Paul Guilhaume
- Edited by: Pauline Gaillard
- Release date: 16 May 2016 (Cannes)
- Running time: 52 minutes
- Country: France
- Language: French

The Lives of Thérèse (French: Les Vies de Thérèse) is a French documentary film, released in 2016. Directed by Sébastien Lifshitz, the film is a profile of French feminist and LGBT activist Thérèse Clerc as she battles terminal illness. Clerc died several weeks before the film's theatrical premiere.

The film won the Queer Palm for best LGBT-related film at the 2016 Cannes Film Festival.

== Synopsis ==
The documentary covers Clerc's battle with terminal illness and includes recordings of the last days of her life at her request. Clerc had previously appeared in another of Lifshitz's documentaries, The Invisible.
