= Madame Arthur =

Cabaret in Paris, France

Coordinates: 48.8826°N 2.3396°E

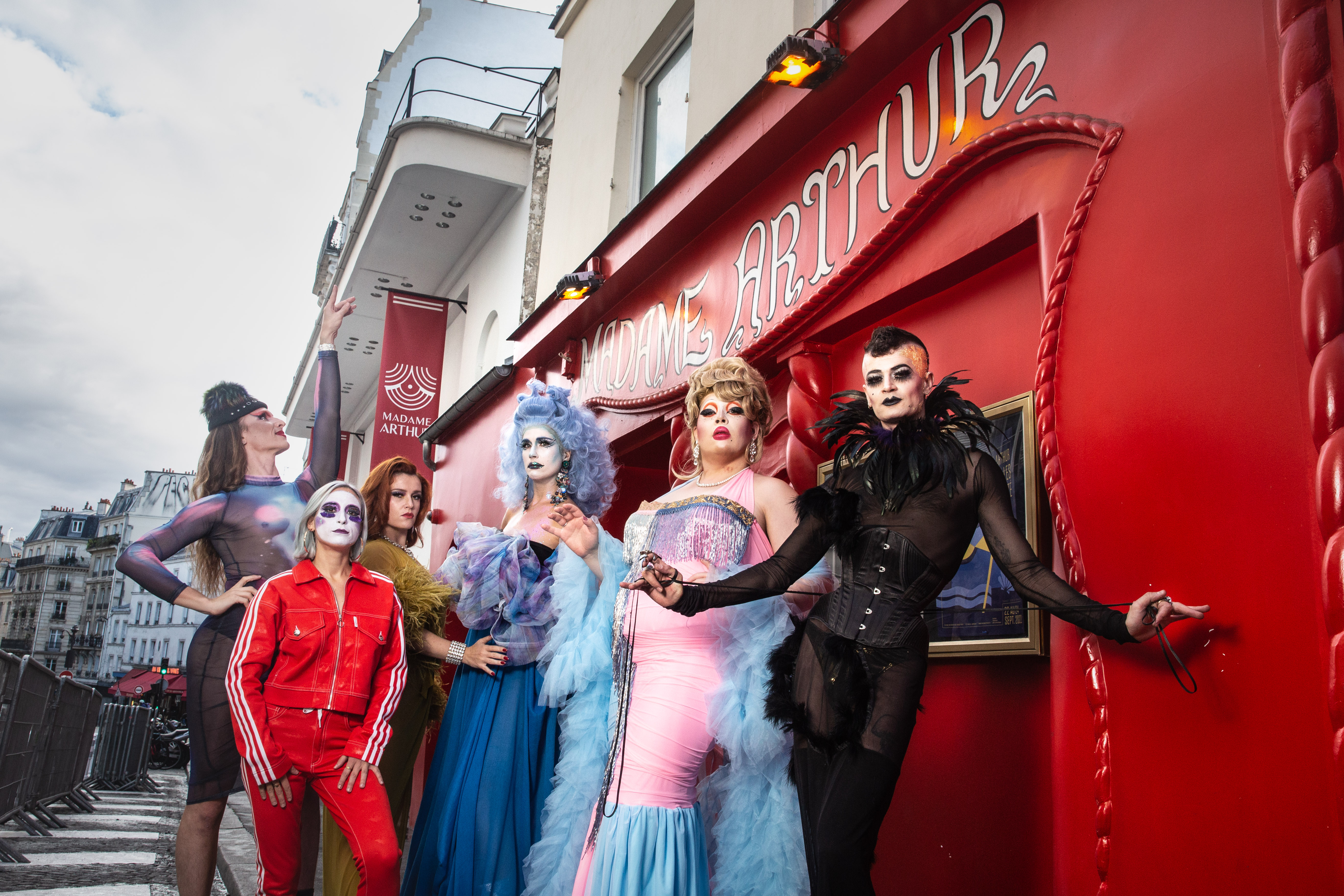
- Interactive map of the Madame Arthur area

General information
- Type: Cabaret, Club
- Location: 75 rue des Martyrs, Paris 75018, France
- Opened: 1946
- Renovated: 2015

Other information
- Public transit access: M12 Pigalle - Abbesse

Website
- https://www.madamearthur.fr/

Madame Arthur is the first gender-twist cabaret in France, opening in 1946 and taking its name from the famous song written in 1860 by Paul de Kock and performed by Yvette Guilbert.

It is located at 75 bis Rue des Martyrs, in the heart of Pigalle, in the 18th arrondissement of Paris.

In 2015, Madame Arthur's building was combined with the adjacent Divan du Monde to form a single cabaret club.

== History ==
=== Background ===
Before 1868, when the commune of Montmartre became part of Paris, the Chaussée des Martyrs was exempt from taxes on alcohol, particularly wine. Today's Rue des Martyrs is known as the Musette Saint-Flour, popular for its cheap alcohol. In 1861, the ballroom Sant-Flour Musette was transformed into Brasserie des Martyrs, patronized by people such as Charles Baudelaire, Edgar Degas, and Jules Vallès. In 1871 it became the café-chantant Divan Japonais, and the owner Théophile Lefort decorated it in Japanese style.

=== Establishment ===
In 1946, Marcel Ouizman (also spelled Oudjman, Ouissmann or Wutsman), a Jewish pied-noir who owned a club Le Binocle before the war, chose the song Madame Arthur as the name of the cabaret he opened at Rue des Martyrs. His business partner, known as Floridor, was also the host, and having died within the first few months, he was replaced by another host, ex-priest and poet Loulou. He managed Madame Arthur and the more exclusive Le Carrousel de Paris with his common-law wife Madame Germaine. The venue held shows of 1930s-style female impersonation done by cisgender transformistes or travesti. Performers would typically cover popular songs. The first star of the cabaret was an ex-ballet dancer, who performed under the name Maslowa. She performed as Yvette Guilbert alongside compère Loulou who performed in masculine clothes.

In February 1949, the prefecture announced an edict banning "travesti attractions or shows" which were "facilitat[ing] perversion and acts of debauchery" to which the management initially complied. However, this led to some performers taking hormones and growing their hair to avoid being accused of cross-dressing.

In the 1950s, Ouizman's Madame Arthur and Le Carrousel de Paris attracted new generation of travesti performers (such as Coccinelle, Fétiche and Bambi, who sought after medical transition. Some of the transgender and drag artists who performed at Madame Arthur include Baddabou, Cricri, Chantaline Erika Keller, Estelle Roederer, Angélique Lagerfeld, Chablie, Yeda Brown, Dominot and Bambi. Madame Arthur was a training grounds of sorts, and its performers aimed to progress to the more exclusive Le Carrousel. The performances of femininity at Madame Arthur were played for laughs than those at Le Carrousel.

Joseph Ginsburg (nicknamed Père Jo), the father of Serge Gainsbourg, was a pianist there from the beginning. Since 1954 Gainsbourg himself sometimes replaced him, and composed some songs there for the cabaret revue, songs which were his first compositions but were not published until after his death. One of them, Antoine le casseur was written for a transformiste Lucky Sarcell, who danced for Mistinguett. Several of those songs (Zita la panthère, Meximambo, Tragique cinq à sept), have not been found.

Bambi's description of Madame Arthur:

The entrance is all cramped, and the checkroom below. We find ourselves in a sort of airlock that opens onto the auditorium. At the other end is the stage. Near the entrance, the bar. Be tween the stage and the bar, three vertical rows of adjoining tables. Each table seats four people. Sometimes five, six or even seven people are crammed in, thanks to the addition of stools that clutter up the aisles and impede service. The atmosphere is all the warmer for it. Beyond the hall, the offices and part of the dressing rooms. And on the upper floors of the building, there are other dressing rooms and the sewing workshops.

Maslowa was considered Madame Arthur's best revue leader by Bambi:

Maslowa would stand in the room as soon as the first customers arrived and acclimatize them to the evening they were about to experience. He was almost always dressed in pink satin pyjamas, didn't wear a wig, and with his naturally blond hair did a hairstyle that had something feminine about it. He always wore make-up, but lightly: little beard. The lips were drawn in a heart shape, as in 1925. What drew the most attention, and even fixed the gaze, were his eyes. Immense green eyes that could take on any expression, from naivety to mischief, from tenderness to indignation, from admiration to mockery. Most often self-mockery. His wit was not the kind of chansonnier of the time, nor of today. His main subject was himself, a character of a giddy, extravagant, good-natured young woman. I thought Loulou and Maslowa's jokes were funny in themselves. And they certainly were. Sometimes they were. But if the biggest puns like "Have you seen Monte Carlo? - No, I haven't seen anyone ride" were infinitely funny, and every day, it was because our hosts, who often repeated the same gags, discovered new ones and lived intensely in front of their audience. A simple routine? No! Every day, every moment, they recreated every expression, every word. Life itself. Twenty years of uninterrupted success, with no vacations.

In 1961, Ouizman opened another cabaret called Madame Arthur in Amsterdam with two artists from Paris, Rita Del Ora and Capucine, and some local talent. It's now the Heineken Music-Hall. Ouizman retired from business in 1985, and Madame Arthur closed in 1994.

== Today ==
Having been closed for many years, it was entirely restored and reopened in November 2015 by Divan du Monde, which has the neighbouring venue. Nowadays a troupe of artists offers the public covers of songs in French, classic or more modern, accompanied by piano and accordion.
