= Yeda Brown =

Brazilian actress

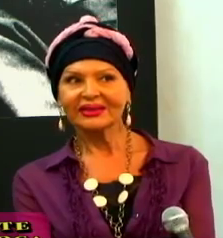
- Yeda Brown in 2013
- Born: 1945 (age 80–81); Bagé
- Occupations: vedette, actress

Yeda Brown (born in Bagé, 1945) is a Brazilian vedette and actress who achieved notoriety in Spain in the 1970s and 1980s for being one of the first transgender women to be visible in the media, being considered one of the muses of Salvador Dalí and of Spanish transition to democracy.

== Biography ==
Brown was born in 1945 in municipality of Bagé, in state Rio Grande do Sul. Daughter of a Brazilian army officer who forced her to do military service, she moved to Rio de Janeiro in 1967. She changed her name to Yeda inspired by 1963 Miss Universe Iêda Maria Vargas, who also held from Rio Grande Do Sul.

Before residing in Spain from 1975, Yeda Brown performed in Parisian female impersonation cabarets Le Carrousel and Madame Arthur. She settled in Barcelona and participated in a show at the Barcelona de Noche room. Because she had undergone sex reassignment surgery in Brussels, she caught the attention of the press and appeared in magazines such as Diez Minutos or Papillón, which focused on the surgical technique that was a novelty in Spain.

Between 1977 and 1978 she continued his successful artistic career in various Spanish venues and theaters, being the leading figure in many shows and sharing the bill with characters such as Paco España. At the same time, she combined her career as a vedette with appearances in the cinema. She performed in El transexual (1977) directed by José Jara, first film that mixes documentary and fiction on the subject of transness in Spanish cinema, in which she limited herself to giving her testimony. The following year she played a supporting role in Rostros by Juan Ignacio Galván. In 1979 she appeared briefly in Historia de 'S' by Francisco Lara Polop. In addition to cinema, Yeda was modeling for erotic magazines of the time, such as Party, Pill, Garbo, Clímax or Lib.

In the 1980s, her appearances in the press were minimal, although her career in cabarets and theaters continued. From 1989 she lived in Benidorm, where she was a celebrity of the Alicante municipality. In 1996, she was attacked by a pensioner from Extremadura who attended one of her shows, biting her breast while Yeda pressed her chest against the attacker's face as part of the show.

In the 1990s, Yeda was a regular on late-night television shows and talk shows about trans issues on shows like Parle vosté, calle vosté, Querida Carmen, El programa de Ana, Aquí se discute or Esta noche cruzamos el Mississippi.

In 2012, Yeda Brown returned to her country of origin, and in 2016, thanks to the collaboration of the Nucleo de Práctica Jurídica da FACHA, she managed to get the Brazilian state to recognize her gender identity on her Identity Card. This process was documented in documentary Yeda Brown - Efeito Borboleta.

== Filmography ==
- El transexual (1977)
- Rostros (1978)
- Historia de S (1979)
- Yeda Brown - Efeito Borboleta (2017)
