= Dominot =

Italian actor and drag queen (1930-2014)

- Born: Antonio Iacono; 1930; Tunis, Italy (now Tunisia)
- Died: 17 October 2014 (aged 83–84); Velletri, Italy
- Occupations: Actor, female impersonator
- Known for: La Dolce Vita

Dominot (1930 – 17 October 2014) was an Italian actor and female impersonator. For many years he was part of the avant-garde café society in Rome that was portrayed in the film La Dolce Vita. Dominot himself appeared in La Dolce Vita.

== Biography ==
Antonio Iacono (or Jacono) was born in Tunis in 1930 (according to Andrea Pini in 1934), raised by the immigrants from Caltanissetta, and in his hometown he began his first theater practice. At a very young age, he started to perform en travesti in the local "la Pochinierre".

Around the age of twenty he moved to Paris, where he studied acting at a theater school with Jacques Toulsa of the Comédie-Française. To pay for his studies, he did travesti striptease shows at Madame Arthur (which at the time was, in Europe, the most famous venue of travesti shows) in Pigalle, and sang at Le Carrousel de Paris. Later he also performed en travesti in Tehran, where he lived for a short time.

At the end of the 1950s he settled permanently in Rome, where he attended the café society portrayed in the film La Dolce Vita, without hiding his homosexuality, and befriending among others, Giò Stajano and Vinicio Diamanti. In 1958 he met Federico Fellini, who gave him a part in La Dolce Vita. The final line of the film belongs to Dominot, who plays himself: an out, cross-dressing, gay man in Rome of the sixties. The film performances of Iacono and Stajano have been connected to the rise of homosexual visibility in Italy by the historian of homosexuality Andrea Pini.

In the 1960s and 1970s he devoted himself to avant-garde theater, working with the theater director Giancarlo Nanni. Dominot worked at the "La Fede" theater in Trastevere with other cross-dressing actors, later splitting from the theater to create a new group with some of those actors. The "splitters" staging of Wedekind's Spring Awakening was very successful. At the time he also met Pier Paolo Pasolini.

In 1984, Dominot opened his own club in Rome, Il baronato quattro bellezze, where he performed (into his eighties) en travestì singing the repertoire of chanson française, from Édith Piaf to Juliette Gréco.

In 2005 he returned to the big screen, thanks to Abel Ferrara, who made him perform during the opening credits of his Mary, and in 2007 in Go Go Tales.

Dominot died in Velletri on 17 October 2014. In 2016 journalist Maricla Boggio published a biography of Dominot named Dominot: Racconto confidenziale di un artista en travesti.

== Filmography ==
- La Dolce Vita, dir. Federico Fellini (1960)
- A Matter of Time, dir. Vincente Minnelli (1976)
- Salon Kitty, dir. Tinto Brass (1976)
- Sturmtruppen, dir. Salvatore Samperi (1976)
- Night Club, dir. Sergio Corbucci (1989)
- Mary, dir. Abel Ferrara (2005)
- Go Go Tales, dir. Abel Ferrara (2007)

== Theatre ==
- Kiss me Kate (1974)
- Naked (1981)
- Risveglio di primavera (Spring Awakening)
- A come Alice
- Assoli assemble
