= Les Invisibles (film) =

- Directed by: Sébastien Lifshitz
- Cinematography: Antoine Parouty
- Edited by: Pauline Gaillard and Tina Baz
- Release date: 2012
- Running time: 115 minutes
- Country: France
- Language: French

Les Invisibles is a French documentary film written and directed by Sébastien Lifshitz and released in 2012.

== Synopsis ==
This film is about men and women who, born during the interwar period, have nothing in common apart from being homosexuals and have chosen to live in broad daylight in an era when society rejected homosexuality. They loved, desired, and fought to be recognized. Today, they recount this rebellious life, divided between the will to fit in with everyone else and the obligation to invent a freedom to flourish.

== Participation ==
Yann and Pierre, Bernard and Jaques, Pierrot, Thérèse, Christian, Catherine and Elisabeth Monique, Jaques.

== Creation ==
Lifshitz spent nearly a year and a half searching for the interviewees necessary to film the documentary. He contacted numerous connections he had in France, namely ARIS in Lyon. Lifshitz met 70 people and filmed 10 portraits of couples and individuals, although not all were included in the final montage.

== Distinctions ==
Lifshitz received the Pierre Guénin Prize against Homophobia and for Equal Rights for this film and his next, Bambi (2013). According to a statement by SOS homophobia association, "Sebastian Lifshitz's work renders visible not only the LGBTQ population but especially its most forgotten categories."

=== Awards ===
- 2013: César for best documentary film
- 2012: Festival Chéries-Chéris: Grand prix for documentary films
- 2012: Face à Face Festival du film gay et lesbien de Saint-Étienne: Audience award - Grand prize for feature films
- 2013: Étoile d'or du cinéma français for best documentary
- 2012: Festival Âge d'or-Cinédécouvertes (Brussels): Audience award

=== Nominations ===
- 2012: British Film Institute Awards: Grierson Award
