= Divan Japonais (lithograph) =

Lithograph poster by Henri de Toulouse-Lautrec

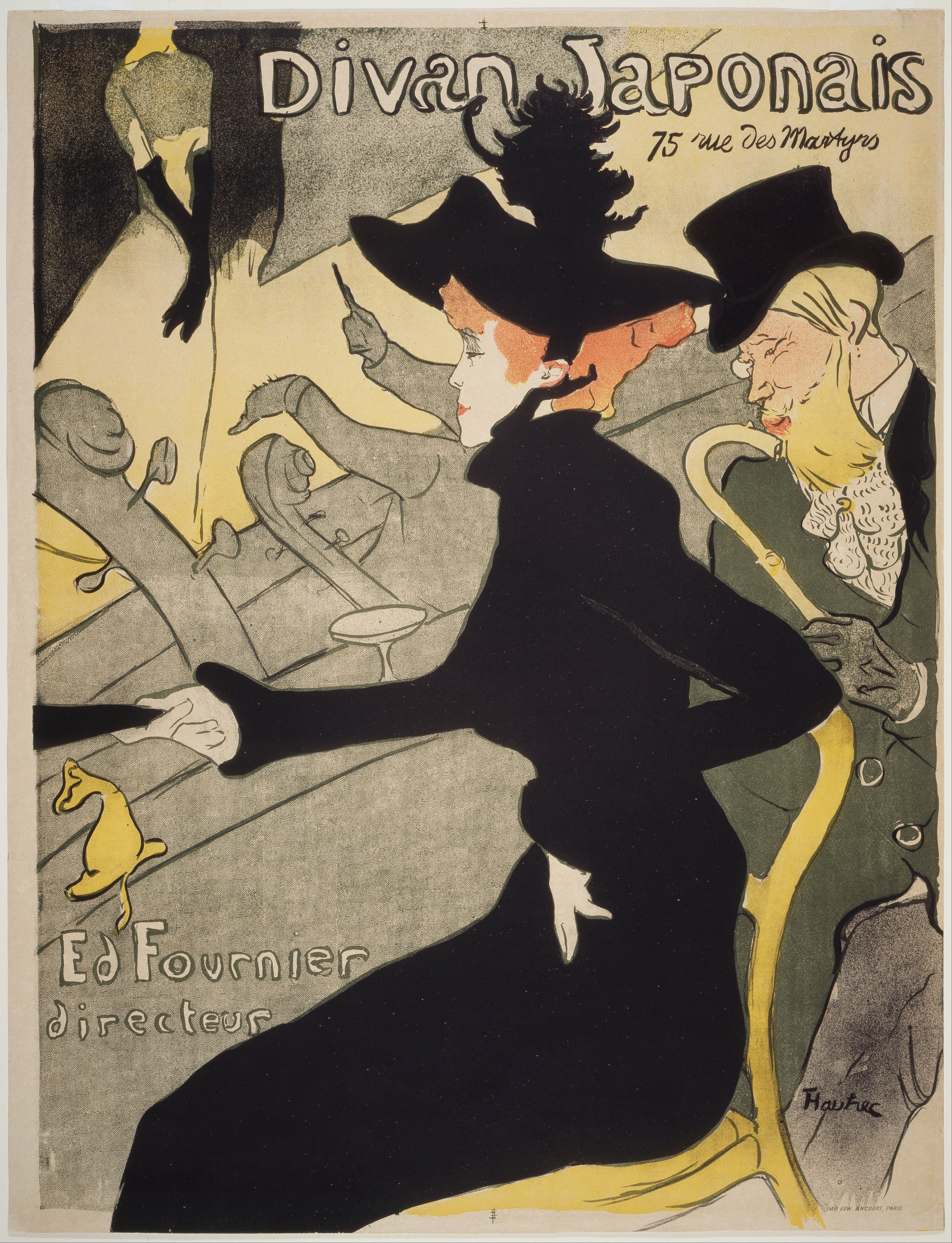
- Artist: Henri de Toulouse-Lautrec
- Year: circa 1893-1894

Divan Japonais is a lithograph poster by French artist Henri de Toulouse-Lautrec. It was created to advertise a café-chantant that was at the time known as Divan Japonais. The poster depicts three persons from the Montmartre of Toulouse-Lautrec's time. Dancer Jane Avril is in the audience. Beside her is writer Édouard Dujardin. They are watching a performance by Yvette Guilbert. Though her face is not included in the poster, she is recognizable by her tall, thin frame and long black gloves.
