= RTP2 =

Portuguese television channel

- Logo used since 2026
- Country: Portugal
- Broadcast area: Portugal, reaching Spain via overspill of the Portuguese terrestrial network
- Headquarters: Lisbon; Porto

Programming
- Language: European Portuguese
- Picture format: 1080i HDTV (downscaled to 576i for the SDTV feed)

Ownership
- Owner: Rádio e Televisão de Portugal
- Sister channels: RTP1; RTP Notícias; RTP Desporto; RTP Memória; RTP Açores; RTP Madeira; RTP África; RTP Mundo; RTP Zig Zag

History
- Launched: 25 December 1968; 57 years ago
- Former names: Segundo Programa (1968–1978); RTP Canal 2 (1989–1992); RTP TV2 (1992–1996); 2: (2004–2007)

Links
- Website: rtp.pt/rtp2

Availability

Terrestrial
- TDT: Channel 2 (SD)

Streaming media
- RTP Play: http://www.rtp.pt/play/direto/rtp2

RTP2 (RTP dois) is a Portuguese free-to-air television channel owned and operated by state-owned public broadcaster Rádio e Televisão de Portugal (RTP). It is the company's second television channel, and is known for broadcasting cultural, factual, and children's programming without interruptions, including documentaries, concerts, theatre and independent, European and classic cinema.

It was launched on 25 December 1968 as the second regular television service in Portugal, eleven years after RTP's first channel was launched on 7 March 1957. Initially it was positioned as a repeats channel, before obtaining a level of programming autonomy in 1975, and then, full autonomy in October 1978. Since the beginning, the channel had a strong cultural character, though it also had a broader scope in its programming, acting largely as a complementary service to RTP1. In 1992, with the impending launch of commercial television channel SIC, it was repositioned as a slightly more commercial service; this strategy failed and in 1994, it became a niche channel with decreasing ratings.

RTP2 aims at less mainstream and more intellectual content. RTP2 is the one of several Portuguese and European national/international channels that has a strict cultural and educational programming line. RTP2 is the only broadcaster from Portugal that broadcasts programming without interruptions, ad breaks or in line messaging. It became a 24-hour service in 2005. RTP2's line-up is devoted to worldwide recognized quality television content, institutional programming or advertising, television series, cinematography, documentary films, theatre, and classical music. As of 2007, its share of the national audience was 5%-7%.

Until the early 2010s, some of RTP2's output, including national and imported content, was seen on RTP Açores and RTP Madeira. The arrival of digital terrestrial television made these arrangements obsolete.

== History ==
RTP studied the hypothesis of launching a second channel in 1967, these plans went into fruition in 1968. The service (going under the unofficial name of II Programa) began broadcasting on 25 December 1968 on the UHF band, broadcasting to large urban centres, simply relaying programming from the first network over the course of two hours every night. In 1969, the channel had 1012 hours of operation, living upon repeats from the main service.

Regular broadcasts started on 21 November 1970. In 1971, the channel added an extra hour to its daily schedule, now starting at 20:30. As the 1970s progressed, the channel slowly started to add (predominantly European) shows on the schedule that RTP1 did not air.

On 16 October 1977, RTP decided to separate RTP-1 and RTP/2, giving each channel their own teams and news operations. Fernando Lopes became the controller of the newly-separate channel, being nicknamed as "Canal Lopes" (the Lopes channel). RTP2 also gained a separate news team for Informação/2, at 22:00, which employed 25 journalists compared to RTP1's 40. Competition between the two channels was touted as "qualitative but not absurd". Under Fernando Lopes, RTP2 gave prominence to programming outside of traditional concepts seen on RTP1, with topics ranging from analysis of societal issues to science and culture. Imported programming in this phase included I, Claudius, Spider-Man and Flash Gordon. That year alone, RTP2 broadcast a total of 1,065 hours

In February 1980, it was announced that RTP was going to abolish the autonomous two-channel system, with RTP2 falling under RTP1's control again. Informação/2 was on track for liquidation as an autonomous unit. Informação/2 was replaced by Jornal da Noite in 1982, partly produced in the Porto studios.

RTP2 started broadcasting from the Porto facilities on 27 June 1981, initially on weekends, before expanding to other days of the week. In February 1982, RTP2's coverage extended to the Algarve region following reconstruction work of the Fóia transmitter.

On 5 May 1986, the channel started relaying the Europa TV experiment, airing the channel's programming between 16:30 and 20:00. RTP had joined the project on 24 June 1985. The launch of Europa TV on RTP2 was delayed several times, in 1986 it was the first time a pan-European television network was relayed live on terrestrial television. As soon as Europa TV closed, some Music Box shows were relayed on the channel.

RTP2's old format ended on 12 October 1986, with the airing of the made-for-TV movie A Bomba, produced by António Albuquerque (alias Dick Haskins). Up until then, the channel's identity had stagnated since the late 1970s, and that the new season would bring forth improvements. The new format started the following day, with the introduction of new programs that would revitalize the channel. Among them was Agora Escolha, a phone-in show which allowed the viewer to choose from two different TV shows. It got cancelled in early 1994, apart from a brief (and web-centric) revival in 2011 on RTP Memória. In tandem with that, the channel increased its broadcasting hours, which included an in-depth news service at 9pm, Jornal das 9.

With the impending legalization of commercial television in Portugal, RTP2 was the center of discussions regarding the potential scenario where the Portuguese Catholic Church would either license part of the channel's schedule in a "prime slot". The scenario was proven unviable and the Church opted for a private television license.

On 17 September 1990, RTP 2 was renamed Canal 2, promoted as "a valid and aggressive alternative", then to TV2 on 14 September 1992. The decision to rename the channel as TV2 and reface it completely were in response to the launch of SIC on 6 October, with a controversial campaign featuring a woman pregnant of a television set. As TV2, the channel's slogan was A Outra TV. In an initial phase, TV2 was seen by RTP as "a channel that doesn't enter into a war with nobody, as it lives peacefully with everyone". Moreover, it was seen as an attempt to compete against the impending arrival of the new private channels (SIC and TVI). In 1994-1995, TV2 was forced to focus entirely on niche content, causing major changes to the channel's schedule. High-profile football matches and telenovelas were transferred from TV2 to the more mainstream channel, Canal 1 and the channel's ratings started to vertiginously decrease. 1996 was the last year where it had a share of over 10%; since then, the channel's share fell considerably year after year.

On 29 April 1996, the channel's name reverted to RTP2, carrying the same scheduling format as TV2. The channel started to relay Euronews in Portuguese at certain times.

Commercial advertising was now prohibited towards the new millennium. In December 2000, RTP started allowing sponsors on the channel again, under the claim that sponsorship agreements did not count as advertising. Rumors began circulating in January 2001 regarding the potential conversion of RTP2 to an all-news channel, as well as having content geared towards education, science and technology. For this end, RTP would build a special studio for this purpose.

On 5 December 2003, the channel renamed once again, becoming 2:, pronounced a dois (the two). As a result, the channel was now forced to focus on children's programming, cultural interests and the civil society.

In March 2007, it was announced that the name RTP2 would return, effective 19 March. On May 31, 2007, the eve of Children's Day, the channel aired the Danish-Canadian 17-minute film So That's How (Então é Assim) about sexual education, which was accompanied by a debate. The film was repeated the following evening after the evening Zig Zag block, at 8:30pm. Parents would decide or not if their children should watch the film.

Beginning in 2015, RTP2 started increasing the number of non-mainstream TV series in its line-up, mainly coming from Europe. The Danish series Borgen kickstarted this trend in early 2015. The channel aired the three seasons all at once, averaging 70-75,000 viewers per episode.

Teresa Paixão ended her stint as director of RTP2 on June 30, 2025 after ten years. From July 1, the channel became managed by Nuno Galopim, who is also director of RTP Memória under the cabinet reshuffle.

== Logos and identities ==

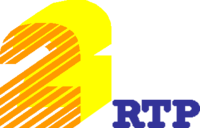
RTP2's fifth logo used from 21 March to July 1983.

RTP2's ninth logo used from December 1985 to 12 October 1986.

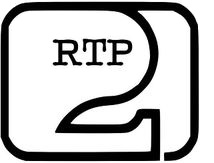
RTP2's tenth logo used from 13 October 1986 to 1 December 1988.

RTP2's twelfth and ancient logo used from 17 September 1990 to 13 September 1992.

First phase of RTP2's fourteenth and older logo used until 11 October 1998.

Second phase of RTP2's fourteenth logo used until 27 October 2001.

RTP2's fifteenth and former logo used from 28 October 2001 to 5 January 2004

RTP2's sixteenth and former logo used from 5 January 2004 to 18 March 2007.

RTP2's seventeenth and previous logo used from 19 March 2007 to 9 May 2016.

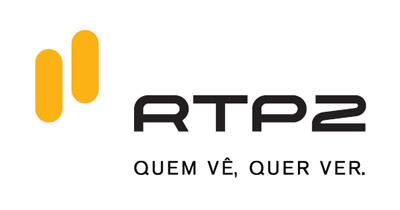
RTP2's seventeenth and previous logo with the slogan "Quem vê, quer ver".

RTP2's eighteenth and previous logo used from 10 May 2016 to 29 March 2026.

=== 1968-1977 ===
By the time of the start of RTP2's broadcast, it didn't use any logo but has used the same logo as its sister channel RTP1.

=== 1977-1979 ===
RTP2 began a 12-year period of changing logos alongside its sister channel RTP1, and that's why these two channels were changing their logos as well as their on-air identities at overall for a lot of various times. Obviously, RTP2 were adopting a new logo as a separate entity in October 1977, and it were consisting of a stylish-lowercased rtp wordmark alongside the 2-numeral that is formed out of the letter t, because this logo is so famous for appearing on Zé Gato, that had been aired on RTP2.

=== 1979-1981 ===
Sometimes when RTP's two TV channels commenced a 5-year period of sharing their same logo format with some different colors, RTP2 began to use a new logo on 14 June 1979, and eventually, its new logo were the same than RTP1's new logo, but the RTP1 wordmark are instead replaced with the RTP2 wordmark, because this logo is colored with yellow, so that's why yellow will be RTP2's favorite color.

=== 1981-March 1983 ===
In February 1981, RTP2 got a new logo again and it were the same than RTP1's logo, but the 1-numeral are instead replaced with a red 2-numeral, especially that the RTP wordmark are appearing under the 2-numeral although it is also colored with red.

=== March–July 1983 ===
Later, on 21 March 1983, RTP2 adopted another new logo which is same than RTP1's new logo, and by that, this new logo came up with an ident that contains some music which is a crescendoing synthesizer tune that is sounding very similar to THX's Deep Note.

=== 1984-1985 ===
In the spring of 1984, RTP2 were launching yet another new logo that is similar to RTP1's new logo, but eventually, the 1-numeral are still again replaced by the 2-numeral while it is beside to the "RTP" wordmark, although it is using the Sinaloa typeface while appearing inside a rectangle.

=== 1985-1986 ===
From December 1985, RTP2 got a new logo that consists of a red 2-numeral that is drawn out of three lines while the RTP wordmark are colored with royal blue although it is underneath the symbol, but the RTP wordmark were soon adopted on RTP's logo within the following year.

=== 1986-1988 ===
On 13 October 1986, RTP2 were again getting another new logo that gets changed into a rounded rectangle which has the RTP wordmark appearing to the left of the side of the 2-numeral.

=== 1988-1990 ===
On 2 December 1988, RTP2 were yet again relaunching its on-air identity with a new logo that consists of a 2-numeral which is formed up of three lines that is colored red, green, and purple, although they are forming a larger 2-numeral which will contain a picture that can be seen from the transitory phase which will lead into RTP2's next on-air identity.

=== 1990-1992 ===
On 17 September 1990, RTP2 introduced a new logo which consists of a 2-numeral that is supposed to be a permanent, white and opaque DOG, although it depicts a handwritten "~~2~~"-numeral, and it were eventually coming up with some idents that consists of mainly on several fruit chopped in the middle by the logo, though it gets accompanied by synthesized pieces of music, and besides, there is also a startup ident which consists of something for what it should look like a chalkboard that is drawing of a line which will enter into a TV set until it later forms the logo, but there is also a closedown ident which consist of an animation with the same style that has been used for why it is focusing on the Portuguese discoveries, and that's how it were used as RTP2's anthem film during its on-air identity.

=== 1992-1995 ===
Later, on 14 September 1992, RTP2 became rebranded as RTP TV2, and by that, it introduced a new logo which is based on a stylized yellow-colored stripe that is forming a "2"-numeral, while it is beside to two pieces of quartz that is forming the word "TV", and however, this logo came up with some various idents that are featuring at that time some prominently yellow stripes. The logo was designed by Monika Cabral, a Brazilian working for the Portuguese arm of Young & Rubicam, and was the result of a competition at with sixty entries, which were shortlisted to the three best. The designer took three weeks to conceive it.

In 1994, the graphics were slightly changing to a yellow background with some various stripes, but the logo were remaining the same.

=== 1995-2001 ===
On 29 April 1996, to coincide with the implementing of RTP's new corporate logo, RTP TV2 decided to revive its original name, and so, it were reverting its name back to its original brand as RTP2, thus getting a new logo which consists of a white "2"-numeral that is inside a light-orange-colored background along with the "RTP" wordmark which is underneath in white color, although it is overlaid in a dark blue background, as RTP2's new-looking idents are consisting of mainly on the logo that is flashed on several themes such as typewriters, stripes (a reference to the previous identity), and some dancing people, although these idents are getting accompanied by RTP2's orchestral tune with some prominent arrangements of a harp, violin and cello.

On 12 October 1998, RTP2 redesigned its 1996 identity with a new look that is designed by Thomas Sabel at Novocom, and it will especially give an predominance to the actual people by adding the green color into its color scheme, and besides, from 2000, they were later changed into simple-looking graphics that are designed by BBC Broadcast, but these graphics were only used for promos and the 1998 idents continued to be used. The 2000 graphics were short-lived because they are lasting a short use until 2002 when RTP2 updated and got a new logo.

=== 2001-2004 ===
On 28 January 2002, RTP2 were again upgrading a new logo alongside its sister channel RTP1, but this identity are only using one single ident that is used during the lifetime of this logo, and it consists of a representation of RTP2's logo in a white flash, with a dark orange background.

=== 2004-2007 ===
On 5 January 2004 at 21:00, RTP2 dropped its RTP2 brand changed its name to "2:", also changing its identity, aiming for a younger, yet general audience. All of its bumpers were generated with CGI, and the sound consisted of a lot of electronic and classical sounding music, with prominent piano arrangements.

=== 2007-2016 ===
On 19 March 2007, 2: retired its "2:" brand, and by that, it were reverting its channel name back to the original name as RTP2, thus reviving the "RTP2" brand, but at the same time for resurrecting the RTP2's original name, it implemented a new logo by adopting some new idents that continues to become computer-generated CGIs with a lot of vertical stripes in their various forms as the main theme. The rebrand cost €150,000.

=== 2016-2026 ===
On 10 May 2016 at 21:00, RTP2 launched its current logo along with a new on-screen look, as well as new idents that use yellow, RTP2's signature color.

On 25 April 2020, RTP2 unveiled new idents, the idents were made by Alice Geirinhas, Luís Lázaro Matos, José Pedro Croft, Tomás Cunha Ferreira, Anne Victorino d’Almeida and Joana Carneiro; each artist made its own ident.

== Criticism ==
=== Culotées scandal ===
In May-June 2020, as part of a content realignment during the pandemic, RTP2's Zig Zag aired Culotées (known in Portuguese as Destemidas), a French progressive animated biography series from key leaders of the feminist movement. One of the episodes was a biography of Thérèse Clerc, a French Lesbian feminist, who defended abortion. The episode caused a wave of criticism on social media, under the arguments that the series promoted homosexuality and abortion, with formal complaints headed over to ERC, the regulator. The episode was later removed from RTP's platforms and was scheduled to be redubbed to tone down all references to abortion in the script.

=== Lack of content quotas ===
Since 2017, RTP2 has been fined by ERC for violating the 1998 Television Law, where at least 50% of the programming must be spoken in Portuguese.

== Current programmes ==
=== News ===
- Jornal 2

=== Talk shows ===
- 70x7 (religious talk-show)
- A Fé dos Homens (religious talk-show)
- Bairro Alto (arts talk-show)
- Sociedade Civil (different areas debate talk-show)

=== Magazines ===
- Arquitectarte (architecture magazine)
- Artes de Rua (street arts, magazine)
- Bastidores (cinema magazine)
- Biosfera (environment and ecology magazine)
- Câmara Clara (arts magazine)
- Agora (arts magazine)
- Couto & Coutadas (hunt magazine)
- Da Terra ao Mar (agriculture magazine)
- Iniciativa (business development magazine)
- Universidades (universities magazine)
- Vida por Vida (fire fighters magazine)

=== Debate ===
- Clube de Jornalistas (journalism debate)
- Diga lá Excelência (debate)
- Eurodeputados (eurodeputy's debate)
- Olhar o Mundo (international news debate)
- Parlamento (deputy's debate)

=== Others ===
- Consigo (program)
- Nós (immigration program)
- Café Central
- A Noite do Óscar

=== Blocks ===
- Zig Zag (children, teens' and young people's block broadcast on weekdays from 07:00 to 10:47 and 17:00 to 20:49 and weekends from 08:00 to 13:30 (Saturday)/13:00 (Sunday).

=== Imported shows ===
==== Animated shows ====
- Bob the Builder
- Peppa Pig
- MAD
- Postman Pat
- Numberblocks
- Colourblocks
- Milo
- Toddworld
- Kikoriki
- Wow Wow Wubbzy
- Cyberchase
- Cardcaptor Sakura
- Hi Hi Puffy Amiyumi
- Caillou
- Arthur
