= A Matter of Time (1976 film) =

1976 film by Vincente Minnelli

- Film poster by Ted CoConis
- Directed by: Vincente Minnelli
- Written by: John Gay
- Based on: The Film of Memory (1955 novel) by Maurice Druon
- Produced by: Jack H. Skirball; J. Edmund Grainger
- Starring: Liza Minnelli; Ingrid Bergman; Charles Boyer
- Cinematography: Geoffrey Unsworth
- Edited by: Peter Taylor
- Music by: Score: Nino Oliviero; Songs: Kander and Ebb; George Gershwin; B.G. DeSylva
- Production company: American International Pictures; Coralta Cinematografica
- Distributed by: American International Pictures (US); Variety Distribution (Italy)
- Release date: October 7, 1976
- Running time: 97 minutes
- Countries: United States; Italy
- Language: English
- Budget: $5 million
- Box office: $2.5 million

A Matter of Time (Italian: Nina) is a 1976 musical fantasy film directed by Vincente Minnelli and starring Liza Minnelli, Ingrid Bergman and Charles Boyer. It features songs by the duo of Kander and Ebb, George Gershwin, and B.G. DeSylva. The screenplay, written by John Gay, is based on the novel The Film of Memory (La Volupté d'être) by Maurice Druon.

The fictional story is based loosely on the real life exploits of the infamous Italian eccentric, the Marchesa Casati, whom Druon knew during her declining years in London while he was stationed there during World War II.

An American-Italian co-production, A Matter of Time had a troubled production, which led an aging Vincente Minnelli to be removed from creative control during post-production. The film marked the first screen appearance for Isabella Rossellini, the last for Charles Boyer and Amedeo Nazzari, and it proved to be Minnelli's final project.

== Plot ==
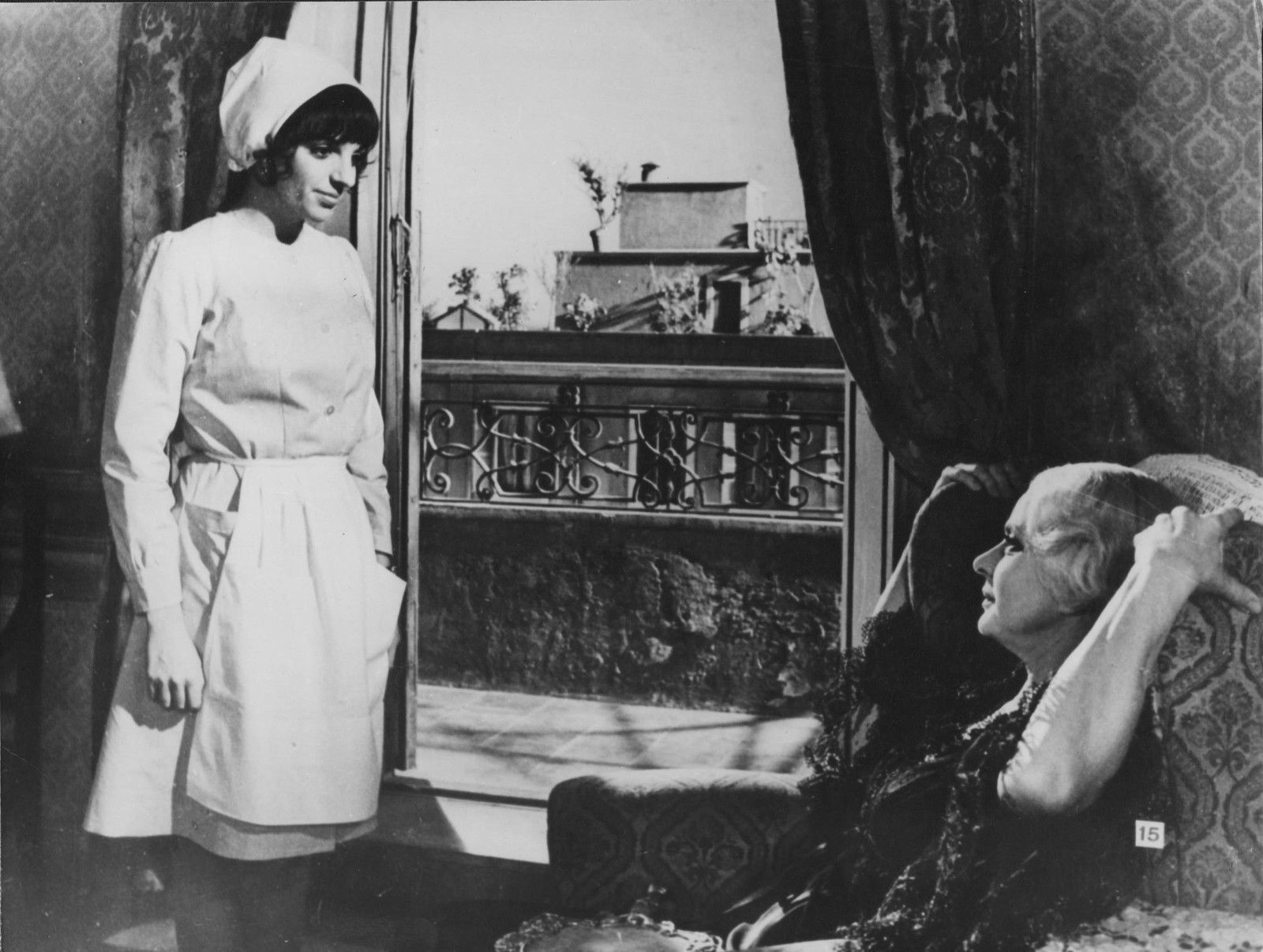
Liza Minnelli and Ingrid Bergman in A Matter of Time

At a mid-1950s press conference, scenes are shown for an upcoming film starring Nina, a popular screen celebrity. While on her way to the conference, Nina looks at herself in an ornate mirror, which triggers a flashback to her arrival in Rome, when she was 19 years old. Her cousin, Valentina, has arranged for her to work as a chambermaid in a dilapidated hotel.

In the course of her duties, Nina meets an ailing Signora Contessa Sanziani, who was once the toast of Europe. The Contessa receives a visit from her husband, Count Sanziani, from whom she has been estranged for 40 years. Old quarrels are revived and Sanziani leaves the hotel, telling the manager that he does not wish to be informed if anything should happen to his wife.

After having a discussion with Nina, the Contessa decides to take her under her wing and turn her into a sophisticated woman. One evening, the Contessa summons Nina to her room and shows her a sari an Indian ambassador had once given her.

She insists that Nina undress and places the sari on her. The Contessa then gives Nina a haircut and puts makeup on her. Now looking nothing like a maid, Nina imagines herself living out the Contessa's existence while listening to her stories. This triggers a series of fantasy sequences, all taking place in elaborate settings such as casinos and Venetian palazzos.

On a rare day off from work, Nina explores Rome and begins to sense the bright future that may lie in store for her. That evening, while she is performing a task for the Contessa, the latter suffers a mental breakdown. The hotel's manager, angered by the Contessa's wailing, insists that she must leave the hotel within a few days.

The next morning, Nina seeks help from Mario, a frustrated screenwriter who lives in the hotel. She has brought with her some of the Contessa's old stock certificates, hoping that Mario can determine their worth. Mario says they are worthless, but feels no pity for the Contessa. Angered, Nina leaves his room.

Later, Nina goes to a bank and finds that Mario was nearly right. Most of the certificates are worthless, but one, from the Bank of Congo, is worth enough to pay the Contessa's hotel bill for weeks – ₤150,000. (Note: An Italian lira was worth about 1/625th of a U.S. dollar in 1954, i.e., 1.6 mills, so ₤150,000 was worth $240. In 2025 terms, that would be about $2880.)

She uses part of this money to help pay the Contessa's hotel expenses. That same day, Nina goes to a restaurant to pick up the Contessa's dinner. A screen director, Antonio Vicari, sees Nina there and uses Mario, who is writing a screenplay for him, to meet her. Eventually, arrangements are made for Nina to have a screen test.

Before she leaves for the studio, she finds that the Contessa has checked out of the hotel to find an old flame, Gabriele d'Orazio. No longer thinking clearly, the Contessa hurries into the street and is hit by a car. She is taken, unconscious, to a Catholic charity hospital.

Meanwhile, Nina has difficulties with her screen test, until Mario gets her to talk about the Contessa. Her subsequent show of passion impresses Vicari, who decides he wants Nina to star in his next picture.

Nina hurries off the set, and after a search, she and Mario locate the hospital where the Contessa is under the care of Sister Pia. Nina is taken to the Contessa's bedside, who has just died. Saddened, Nina takes the Contessa's ornate mirror as a remembrance and leaves the hospital.

Back at the present time, Nina has become a motion picture star. She arrives at the press conference. As she steps out of her limousine, a girl hurries up and says she wants to be just like Nina when she grows up.

== Cast ==
- Liza Minnelli as Nina
- Ingrid Bergman as Countess Lucretia Sanziani
- Charles Boyer as Count Sanziani
- Spiros Focás as Mario
- Tina Aumont as Valentina
- Gabriele Ferzetti as Antonio Vicari
- Orso Maria Guerrini as Gabriele d'Orazio
- Amedeo Nazzari as Tewfik
- Fernando Rey as Charles Van Maar
- Isabella Rossellini as Sister Pia
- Giampiero Albertini as Mr. DePerma
- Arnoldo Foà as Pavelli
- Anna Proclemer as Jeanne Blasto
- Geoffrey Copleston as Hotel Manager
- Dominot as Hotel Porter
- Jean Mas as Kaiser Wilhelm
- Jacques Stany as Vasco Politi
- Marino Masé as Hotel Forum Porter
- Rik Battaglia as Nina's Father
- Edmund Purdom as Nina's Rich Friend

== Production ==
The novel had been adapted for the stage by Paul Osborne as La Contessa in 1965 and starred Vivien Leigh in the title role. Minnelli read the book in 1966, but only obtained the film rights in 1973. He raised the funds via Jack H. Skirball, a sometime producer. Eventually American International Pictures agreed to co-finance with Italian producer Giulio Sbarigia.

Shooting began in February 1975 in Rome and Venice and was meant to take 14 weeks; however, the movie went behind schedule. Minnelli's cut of the movie was over three hours.

Cost-conscious American International Pictures executives, dismayed by filming delays and rising expenses, wrested control of the film from Vincente Minnelli. Liza Minnelli's then husband Jack Haley Jr. re-cut the film to 97 minutes. Vincente Minnelli later disowned it, and fellow director Martin Scorsese took out ads in the trade papers chastizing AIP for its treatment of the screen legend.

John Kander and Fred Ebb wrote original compositions for the film, "The Me I Haven't Met Yet" and the title tune. "Do It Again" by George Gershwin and Buddy G. DeSylva also was heard in the film, performed by Nina (Liza Minnelli) in the ballroom of a Venetian palazzo.

== Critical reception ==
In his review in The New York Times, Vincent Canby wrote "It is full of glittery costumes and spectacular props. It is performed by talented, sophisticated people who adopt the faux-naif gestures of an earlier show-biz tradition, and though it is expensive, it sounds peculiarly tacky...the film has the air of an operetta from which the music has been removed. It's even acted that way...Because A Matter of Time has moments of real visual beauty, and because what the characters say to each other is mostly dumb, it may be a film to attend while wearing your earplugs."

Roger Ebert of the Chicago Sun-Times called it "a fairly large disappointment as a movie, but as an occasion for reverie, it does very nicely. Once we've finally given up on the plot – a meandering and jumbled business – we're left with the opportunity to contemplate Ingrid Bergman at 60. And to contemplate Ingrid Bergman at any age is, I submit, a passable way to spend one's time...she possesses a radiant screen personality...for people who love movie romance, A Matter of Time must have seemed like a dream project. And yet the movie just doesn't hold together."

In Time, Jay Cocks wrote "It makes for an awkward occasion: a group of gifted people working so far below their best talents that everything takes on the giddy air of a runaway charade...the movie could have worked with hard effort and a little magic, but something has gone terribly wrong. Director Minnelli's once wondrous alchemy turns everything to lead. The movie is disjointed, sappy, hysterical; and the actors, perhaps sensing trouble, press on with painful, overbearing desperation...A Matter of Time does not look at all like a Minnelli movie. The fastidious craftsmanship that he has through the years expended even on the lowliest undertaking is nowhere in evidence."
