= Europe by Night =

- Directed by: Alessandro Blasetti
- Written by: Ennio De Concini; Gualtiero Jacopetti
- Cinematography: Gábor Pogány
- Edited by: Mario Serandrei
- Music by: Carlo Savina
- Release date: 1959
- Running time: 102 mins
- Country: Italy

Europe by Night (Italian: Europa di notte) is a 1959 Italian documentary film directed by Alessandro Blasetti.

== Premise ==
A tour of the nightlife in Rome, Paris, London, Madrid, Vienna, Brussels and more.

It features Coccinelle, one of the showgirls at Le Carrousel de Paris, a cabaret known for troupe of transgender performers.

== Reception ==
It grossed $450,000 in Italy. Together with Luigi Vanzi's World By Night, it is considered precursor and main inspiration for the Mondo film genre.
