= Night Club (1989 film) =

- Directed by: Sergio Corbucci
- Screenplay by: Sergio Corbucci; Massimo Franciosa
- Story by: Lucio Fulci
- Produced by: Claudio Bonivento
- Starring: Christian De Sica; Mara Venier; Massimo Wertmüller; Sergio Vastano; Sabina Guzzanti; Roberto Giufoli; Sabrina Ferilli; Elena Parisi; Claudia Gerini; Elisabetta Valentini; Diane Bodart
- Cinematography: Sergio D'Offizi
- Edited by: Ruggero Mastroianni
- Release date: 1989
- Country: Italy
- Language: Italian

Night Club is a 1989 Italian comedy-drama film co-written and directed by Sergio Corbucci.

== Plot ==
Set on the night Fred Buscaglione died in a car accident, the film tells about two bank clerks who hope to convince a rich businessman from Calabria to finance their enterprise by making him spend an unforgettable night of alcohol and women in a Via Veneto night club.

== Cast ==
- Christian De Sica as Walter Danesi
- Mara Venier as Luciana
- Sergio Vastano as Commendator Balestrelli
- Massimo Wertmüller as Piero Grassi
- Sabina Guzzanti as Xandra
- Roberto Ciufoli as Ottavio Volantini
- Elena Parisi as Ilse Nordahl
- Sabrina Ferilli as Erina
- Claudia Gerini as Cristina
- Luciana Turina as the night club owner
- Bruno Martino as himself
- Peter Van Wood as himself
- Dominot as Cristina's Father
