= Blue boy trial =

Japanese court case on sex reassignment surgery

The blue boy trial (ブルーボーイ事件, burū bōi jiken) was a trial regarding the legality of sex reassignment surgery in Japan.

== History ==
In the mid-20th century, the term "blue boy" was slang for a transgender or transvestite person who was assigned male at birth. The term was first applied to the performers from the Parisian cabaret Le Carrousel de Paris when they visited Japan.

== Trial ==
In 1965, a doctor performed sex reassignment surgical operations - specifically removing the testicles - on three trans women sex workers who were taking oestrogen. The doctor was prosecuted for violating eugenics laws and was found guilty of violating Clause 28 of the Eugenics Protection Law. The law prohibited any surgery deemed unnecessary that caused sterilization.

== Aftermath ==
After the trial, sex reassignment surgeries were not performed again until 1998. However, the media coverage of the trial increased general knowledge of sex reassignment surgery and the transgender community in Japan.
