= Sådan får man altså børn =

1990 film by Liller Møller

Sådan får man altså børn (Danish: So That's How You Make Children), known in English as So, That's How!, is a 1990 Danish cel-animated short film produced by Filmforsyningen and created by Liller Møller, based on a script by Møller. The film is aimed at a 2-5 age demographic.

The film is distributed by The Multimedia Group of Canada, who has dubs in foreign languages.

== Plot ==
The film teaches the intended demographic about egg cells, spermatozoons, testicles and other topics, as well as "yes or no" situation on how to make a child. These last topics are seen, for example, when an adult touches the woman in the wrong places, as well as the nine months that take up the pregnancy period. The film has a "simple and fun" approach, with child voices.

The film not only limits itself to reproduction but also gender issues, especially gender abuse.

== Airing on Portuguese television ==
The film aired twice on RTP2, the first late at night on 31 May 2007 inserted in a special edition of Sociedade Civil about the question of sex education for children, and the second the following evening (1 June 2007, Children's Day) at 8:30pm. The aim of the 31 May airing was limited to parents, who were given the chance to watch the film and evaluate if their children would watch or not its showing the following day. The film had been shown before on Portuguese schools since 1991. Some viewers were shocked by the footage seen.
