= Sergio Vastano =

Italian comedian and actor (born 1952)

- Born: 20 December 1952 (age 73); Rome, Italy
- Occupations: Comedian; Actor

Sergio Vastano (born 20 December 1952) is an Italian comedian and actor.

== Life and career ==
Born in Rome into a family of Calabrian origins, Vastano started his career on radio, and made his first television appearances as a sidekick of Andy Luotto. He had his breakout in the mid-1980s, playing the "Bocconiano", a bumbling parody of a Bocconi failing student, in the sketch comedy show Drive In. Following the closure of the show, he took part in a large number of television programs, notably Striscia la notizia, Paperissima, I Cervelloni and Festivalbar.

Vastano was also active on stage, where he worked in the companies led by Andrea Giordana and Lucia Poli, among others. In films, Vastano was mainly cast in character roles. In 1988, he was part of the musical project I Figli di Bubba, a supergroup led by Premiata Forneria Marconi members Mauro Pagani and Franz Di Cioccio, with whom he entered the main competition at the 38th Sanremo Music Festival and recorded the album Essi.

== Selected filmography ==
- Al bar dello sport (1983)
- Italian Fast Food (1986)
- Yuppies (1986)
- Le finte bionde (1989)
- Night Club (1989)
- The Handsome Priest (1989)
- Crazy Underwear (1992)
- Ragazzi della notte (1995)
- Amore a prima vista (1999)
