= Coccinelle =

French actress and entertainer (1931–2006)

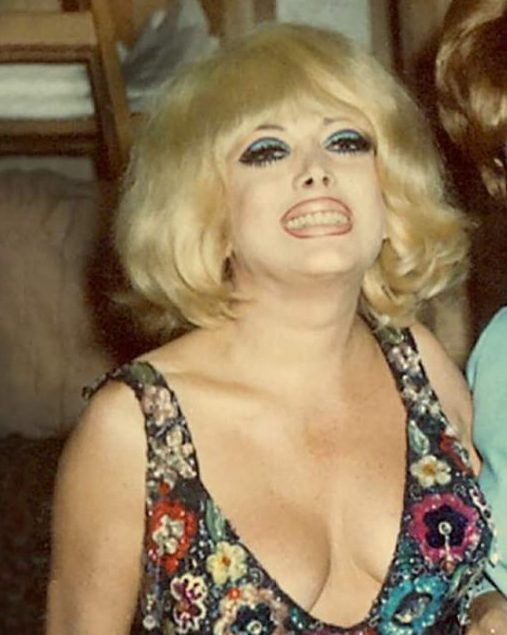
- Coccinelle in 1970
- Born: Jacques-Charles Dufresnoy; 23 August 1931; Paris, France
- Died: 9 October 2006 (aged 75); Marseille, France
- Occupations: Entertainer; activist; singer; actress
- Spouses: Francis Bonnet (m. 1960; div. 1962) Mario Costa (m. 1963; died 1977) Thierry Wilson (m. 1996)

Jacqueline Charlotte Dufresnoy (23 August 1931 – 9 October 2006), better known by her stage name Coccinelle ("ladybird" in French), was a French cabaret entertainer, singer, actress, and transgender activist. She was the first widely publicized celebrity transgender woman to undergo gender reassignment in Europe. Coccinelle was an international celebrity and a renowned club singer, styled as a blonde bombshell and sex symbol.

== Biography ==
=== Early life and education ===
Dufresnoy was born in Paris in 1931 to a working class family at rue Notre Dame de Nazareth No. 66 in the 3rd arrondissement of Paris. Her mother sold flowers in the Pigalle district. At school she played with the girls and was nicknamed "little princess". She was forced to attend an all-boys school from which she often played truant, wanting to become a hairdresser instead. Her homophobic father initially agreed, but only if she agreed to solely cut men's hair. The salon where Dufresnoy ended up working had many sex workers as customers and her father threatened to send her to a reformatory.

=== Adolescence ===
Around 1949 Dufresnoy was working as a valet at a hotel and encountered Lucrèce, another transfemme person for the first time, which was a revelatory moment for her. One weekend she decided to go out in women's clothing which gave her a "sensation of intense jubilation", but she was seen by a neighbour who mistook her for her mother. Her mother later found out but agreed not to tell Dufresnoy's father, Charles. She therefore continued to go out as a woman, accompanied by a hairdressing client, Monique, whom she had befriended and whose clothes she borrowed. They frequented bars including Madame Arthur where Dufresnoy introduced herself to Madame Germaine who, alongside with her common-law husband, Marcel Oudjman, managed the bar as well as Le Carrousel de Paris. Dufresnoy secured an audition at which, purportedly, a ladybird landed on her dress, inspiring her to adopt "Coccinelle" (French for "ladybird") as her stage name. An alternative origin story of the name traces itself back to her having had a favourite black and red polka-dot dress.

Additionally, Lucrèce also attended an audition the same day and both were hired to work at the club. As she was still underage, Dufresnoy had to get her father to sign a form allowing her to work there and so with her mother's support, she lied to him saying she had got a job as a bartender.

Charles Dufresnoy was physically violent with his family and so Coccinelle went to stay with Lucrèce to avoid him. On returning home one day, she unexpectedly encountered her father. He saw her and cried and she understood that he had accepted her. The two began to go out together in public.

== Career ==
=== Madame Arthur ===
Coccinelle had practically stopped wearing men's clothes, except to enter Madame Arthur where she worked - something performers were forced to do to avoid breaking cross-dressing bans that affected the Oudjmans' cabaret bars. However, she continued to face police harassment and Madame Arthur was threatened with closure "if Coccinelle continues to outrage morals and public order".

=== Military conscription ===
Dufresnoy had been taking feminizing hormones when she was deemed fit for army service so was initially sent to the feminine branch of the army. An army doctor who conducted her physical test declared "something must be done" with her body which encouraged her to later seek gender affirming surgery. She was discharged from service.

=== Le Carrousel de Paris ===
After working at Madame Arthur, Coccinelle performed regularly at Le Carrousel de Paris nightclub where she performed covers of popular songs. The club also featured regular acts by other transgender women such as April Ashley and Bambi. Coccinelle's friendship with Bambi was important and the two supported each other. While performing there, Coccinelle became its most famous transgender act and had a featuring segment in the 1959 documentary style film, Europa di notte by director Alessandro Blasetti. The film helped propel her to international fame. The same year, Italian singer Ghigo Agosti dedicated the song Coccinella to her, provoking widespread consternation and controversy.

=== Film and later career ===
Coccinelle appeared in the 1962 Argentine thriller film Los Viciosos and was the first French trans woman to become a major star, when Bruno Coquatrix splashed her name in red letters on the front of Paris Olympia for revue, Cherchez la femme which ran for 7 months at La Olympia in Paris between 1963 and 1964. She later appeared in the 1968 Spanish romantic drama Días de viejo color. Her last public performance was in 1990.

== Gender affirming surgery and legal gender change ==
Coccinelle had a rhinoplasty as part of her feminization and in 1958 first heard about Georges Burou who performed vaginoplasties in Casablanca. She said later, "Dr Burou rectified the mistake nature had made and I became a real woman, on the inside as well as the outside. After the operation, the doctor just said, 'Bonjour, Mademoiselle', and I knew it had been a success." Afterwards, her parents began to call her Jacqueline. Coccinelle very quickly became a media sensation upon her return to France after her surgery in Morocco, with a look and stage act based on the prominent sex symbols of the day. Historian Joanne Meyerowitz wrote "the more sexualized MTF showed up in the sensationalized press in the stories on Coccinelle, who worked at Le Carrousel in Paris".

In 1959 with the help of lawyer, Robert Badinter she legally changed her gender. This legal step thus permitted her to marry and on 16 March 1962, she married French journalist Francis Paul Bonnet at a highly publicised civil ceremony at the town hall of the 17th arrondissement of Paris followed by the church of Saint-Jean de Montmartre on the condition that she be re-baptised since being recognised as a woman. This was the first union involving a transgender person to be officially acknowledged by the government of France, thereby establishing transgender people's legal right to marry. Her marriage to Bonnet was dissolved in 1962. She then married Paraguayan dancer Mario Costa in 1963, who died in 1977. She then married fellow transgender activist Thierry Wilson in 1996.

== Transgender activism and later life ==
Coccinelle worked extensively as an activist on behalf of transgender people, founding the organization "Devenir Femme" (To Become Woman), which was designed to provide emotional and practical support to those seeking gender reassignment surgery. She also helped establish the Center for Aid, Research, and Information for Transsexuality and Gender Identity. Her 1987 autobiography, titled Coccinelle par Coccinelle, was published by Daniel Filipacchi.

An Ecuadorian LGBTQI+ association founded in 1997 was named after her.

== Death ==
Coccinelle was hospitalised in July 2006 following a stroke. She later died on 9 October in Marseille and her funeral was held at Eglise Saint-Roch de Paris.

== Filmography ==
Year	Film	Role	Other notes
1962	I Don Giovanni della Costa Azzurra	Herself	
1962	Los viciosos	Herself	
1968	Días de viejo color	Asistene a la fiesta	

== Discography ==
Coccinelle No 1 (President Records No 38." cda 1052)

1. Tu t'fous de moi [You don't care about me]
2. L'Amour a fleur de coeur [Heart-deep Love]
3. Prends-moi ou laisse-moi [Take me or leave me]
4. Tu es là [You are there]

Coccinelle No 2 (President Records No 12" cda 1052)

1. Je cherche un millionnaire [I'm looking for a millionaire]
2. Avec mon petit faux-cul [With my little false bottom]

Coccinelle - 4 chansons de la Revue de l'Olympia "Chercher la femme" (RCA VICTOR 86.012M - 1963)

1. Cherchez la femme [Look for the woman]
2. On fait tout à la main [Everything is done by hand]
3. C'est sûrement vous [It's probably you]
4. Depuis toujours [Since forever]

Star du Carrousel de Paris CD (Marianne Melodie 041625) Compilation of 20 titles.
