= Los viciosos =

- Directed by: Enrique Carreras
- Release date: October 25, 1962 (Argentina)
- Country: Argentina

Los viciosos ("The Vicious") is an Argentine black-and-white thriller film directed by Enrique Carreras and adapted from a screenplay by Sixto Pondal Ríos. The film was released on October 25, 1962 and starred Graciela Borges, Jorge Salcedo, Eduardo Cuitiño, Myriam de Urquijo and Coccinelle.

== Synopsis ==
Police investigate a drug trafficking ring.

== Cast ==
- Graciela Borges
- Jorge Salcedo
- Eduardo Cuitiño
- Myriam de Urquijo
- Inés Moreno
- Jorge Acuña
- Héctor Gancé
- Coccinelle
- Irma Roy
- Rodolfo Onetto
- Lalo Hartich
- Alberto Barcel
- Enrique Carreras
