= Sébastien Lifshitz =

French film director

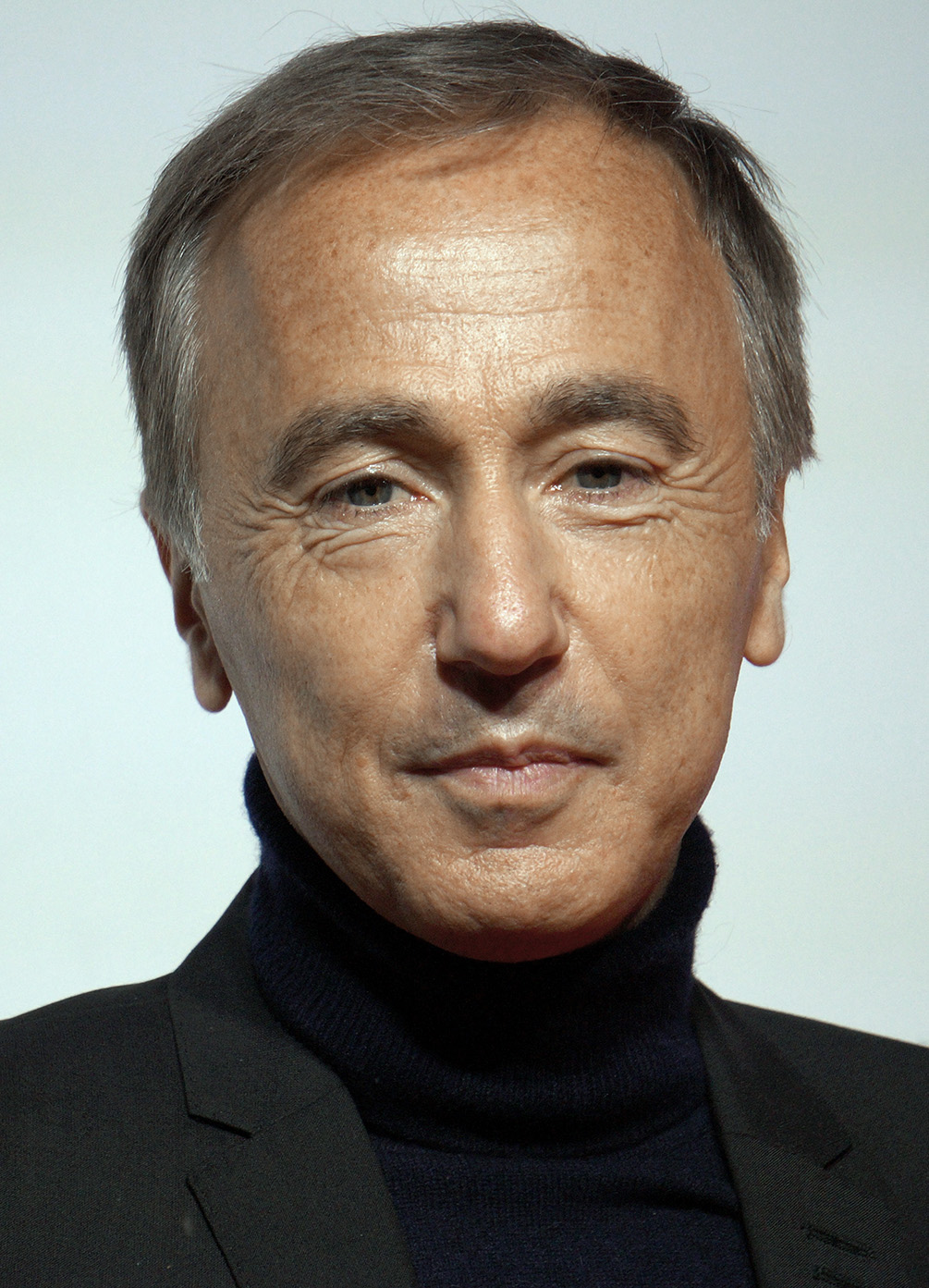
- Born: 1968 (age 57–58); Paris, France
- Occupations: Film director, screenwriter

Sébastien Lifshitz (born 1968) is a French screenwriter and director. He teaches at La Fémis, a school that focuses on the subject of image and sound. He studied at the École du Louvre, and has a bachelor's degree from the University of Paris in history of art.

== Career ==
Lifshitz's work involves LGBTQ+ themes. His 2004 film, Wild Side, involves several narratives, some told forward and some backward, about a transgender prostitute.

He is a two-time winner of the Teddy Award, presented by an independent committee at the Berlin International Film Festival to the year's best films with LGBT themes, winning Best Feature Film in 2004 for Wild Side and Best Documentary Film in 2013 for Bambi, a documentary profile of transgender French entertainer Marie-Pierre Pruvot.

In 2014, Rizzoli International published Lifshitz's The Invisibles: Vintage Portraits of Love and Pride, a collection of gay-themed photos from the early 20th century.

== Filmography ==
Year	Title	Credited as			Notes
Year	Title	Director	Screenwriter	Actor	Notes
1994	Il faut que je l'aime	Yes	Yes		Short film
1996	Claire Denis, la vagabonde	Yes			Documentary film
1998	Open Bodies (Les Corps ouverts)	Yes	Yes	Yes	Also as actor 1998 Cannes Film Festival - Kodak Short Film Award; Prix Jean Vigo for Short Film
1999	Cold Lands (Les Terres froides)	Yes	Yes	Yes	Telefilm (as part of the Gauche-Droite series for Arte); Also as actor (as Garçon Patinoire)
2000	Presque rien	Yes	Yes		
2001	The Crossing (La Traversée)	Yes	Yes		Documentary film
2004	Wild Side	Yes	Yes		Berlinale 2004 - Teddy Award for Best Feature Film
2009	Going South (Plein sud)	Yes	Yes		
2012	The Invisibles (Les Invisibles)	Yes			Documentary film César Award for Best Documentary Film
2013	Bambi	Yes	Yes		Documentary film Berlinale 2013 -Teddy Award for Best Documentary; Nominated—César Award for Best Short Film
2016	The Lives of Thérèse (Les Vies de Thérèse)	Yes	Yes		Documentary film Cannes Film Festival - Queer Palm
2019	Adolescents (Adolescentes)	Yes	Yes		Documentary film Prix Louis-Delluc (for best French film of 2020)
2019	Avenue de Lamballe	Yes			Short film
2020	Garçons sensibles	Yes			Chéries-Chéris 2021
2020	Little Girl (Petite fille)	Yes	Yes		Documentary film Berlinale 2020 - Panorama Grand Prix at 2020 edition of Film Fest Gent
2022	Casa Susanna	Yes	Yes		
2026	Un jeune homme de bonne famille	Yes	Yes		Documentary film

== Bibliography ==
- Rees-Robertsn, N. French Queer Cinema (2008).
- Reeser, T. "Representing gay male domesticity in French film of the late 1990s," In Queer Cinema in Europe (2008).
- Reeser, T. "Transsexuality and the Disruption of Time in Sebastien Lifshitz's Wild Side," in Studies in French Cinema (2007).
