= Le Divan du Monde =

Theatre in Paris, France

Coordinates: 48.8825°N 2.3395°E

- Divan Japonais (1873-?), Théâtre de la Comédie Mondaine (1901-?)
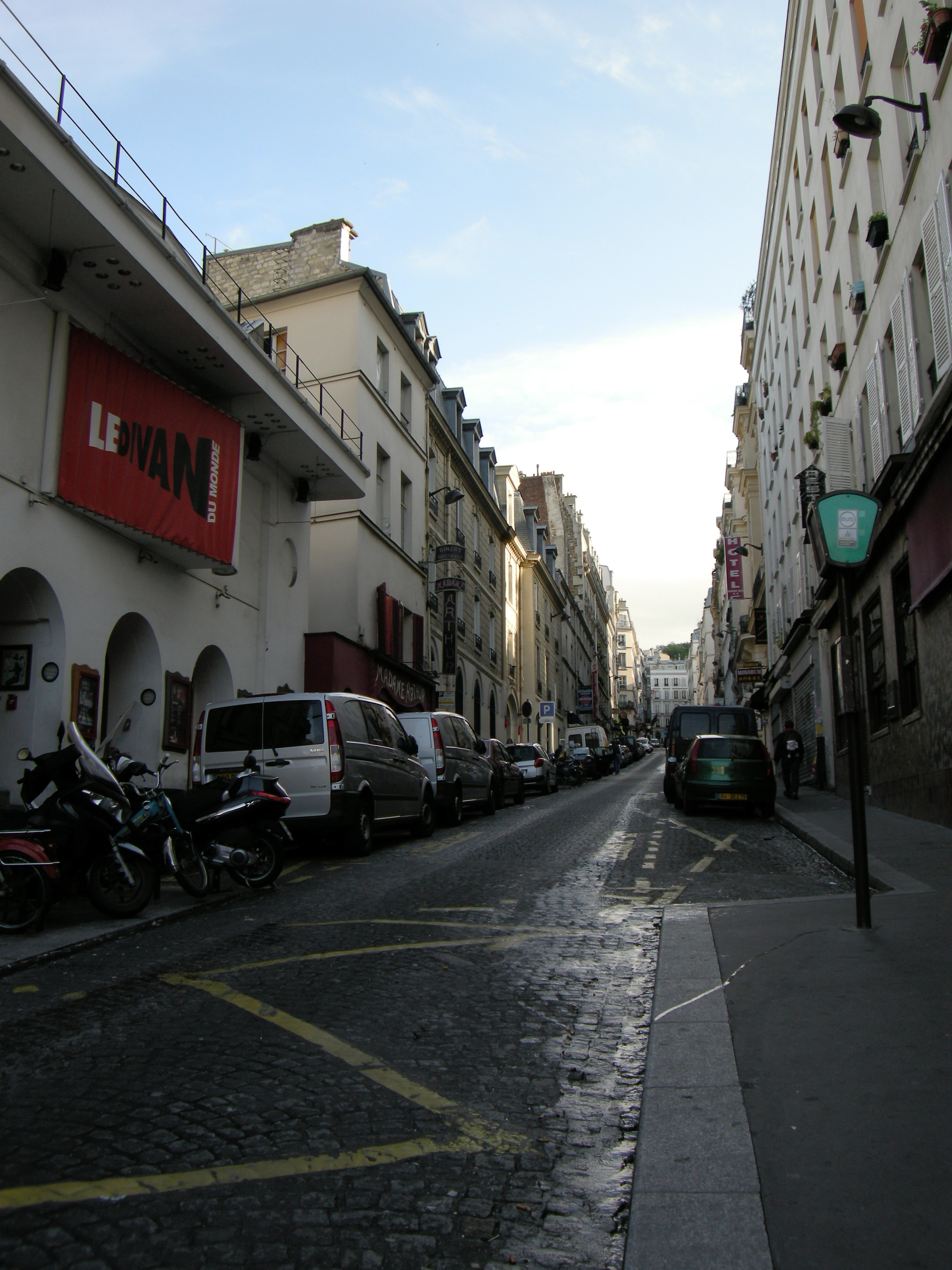
- Front of Le Divan du Monde, rue des Martyrs
- Interactive map of Le Divan du Monde
- Address: 75, rue des Martyrs, 18th arrondissement Paris
- Capacity: approximately 500

Construction
- Opened: 1873

Website
- www.divandumonde.com

Le Divan du Monde ('The World Divan') is a converted theatre, now functioning as a concert space, located at 75 rue des Martyrs, in the 18th arrondissement, in the Pigalle neighborhood of Paris.

== History ==
At the beginning of the 19th century, there was a ballroom called the Saint-Flour Musette. In 1861 it was turned into the Brasserie des Martyrs, which was patronized by Charles Baudelaire, Edgar Degas, and Jules Vallès. This was replaced in 1873 by a café-concert christened the "Divan Japonais" ('Japanese Divan') by its owner Théophile Lefort, who decorated it in Japanese-style. His successor, Jules Sarrazin, had a second room built in the basement called "Temple de la Bonne Humeur" ('Temple of Good Mood').

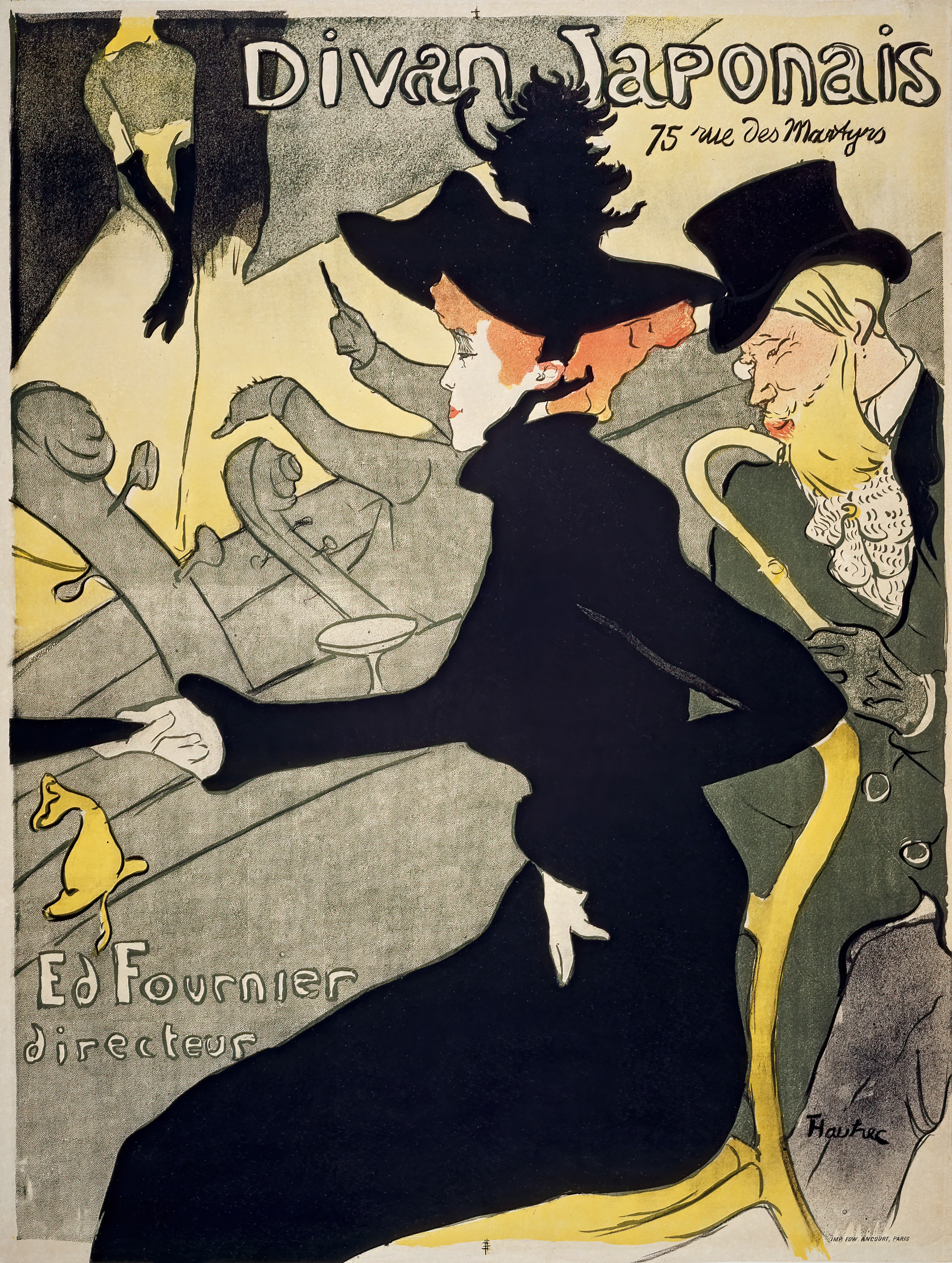
Poster from Henri de Toulouse-Lautrec for the Divan Japonais (1892), showing dancer Jane Avril and critic Édouard Dujardin.

The cabaret singer Yvette Guilbert became famous there when she appeared in 1891 and Dranem was also a featured artist. The pantomime Le Coucher de la Mariée (The Bride Going to Bed) was performed there in 1894. This included for the first time a "naked" woman (i.e. wearing a somewhat transparent blouse), which scandalized the audience. Toulouse-Lautrec and Adolphe Léon Willette, then Pablo Picasso, were frequent visitors.

In 1901, the Divan became the Théâtre de la Comédie Mondaine. In 1946 it became a famous travesti cabaret Madame Arthur, closed in 1994.

In 1994, it was reopened as Le Divan du Monde ('The World Divan'), featuring world music concerts of all genres. The Hip Hop dancers Bintou Dembélé performed there in the late 1990s.

In November 2009, it was completely redecorated, and now hosts events from concerts to club nights. In November 2015 Divan du Monde renovated and reopened the neighbouring venue of Madame Arthur, hosting events there too.
