= Le Carrousel de Paris =

Cabaret in Paris

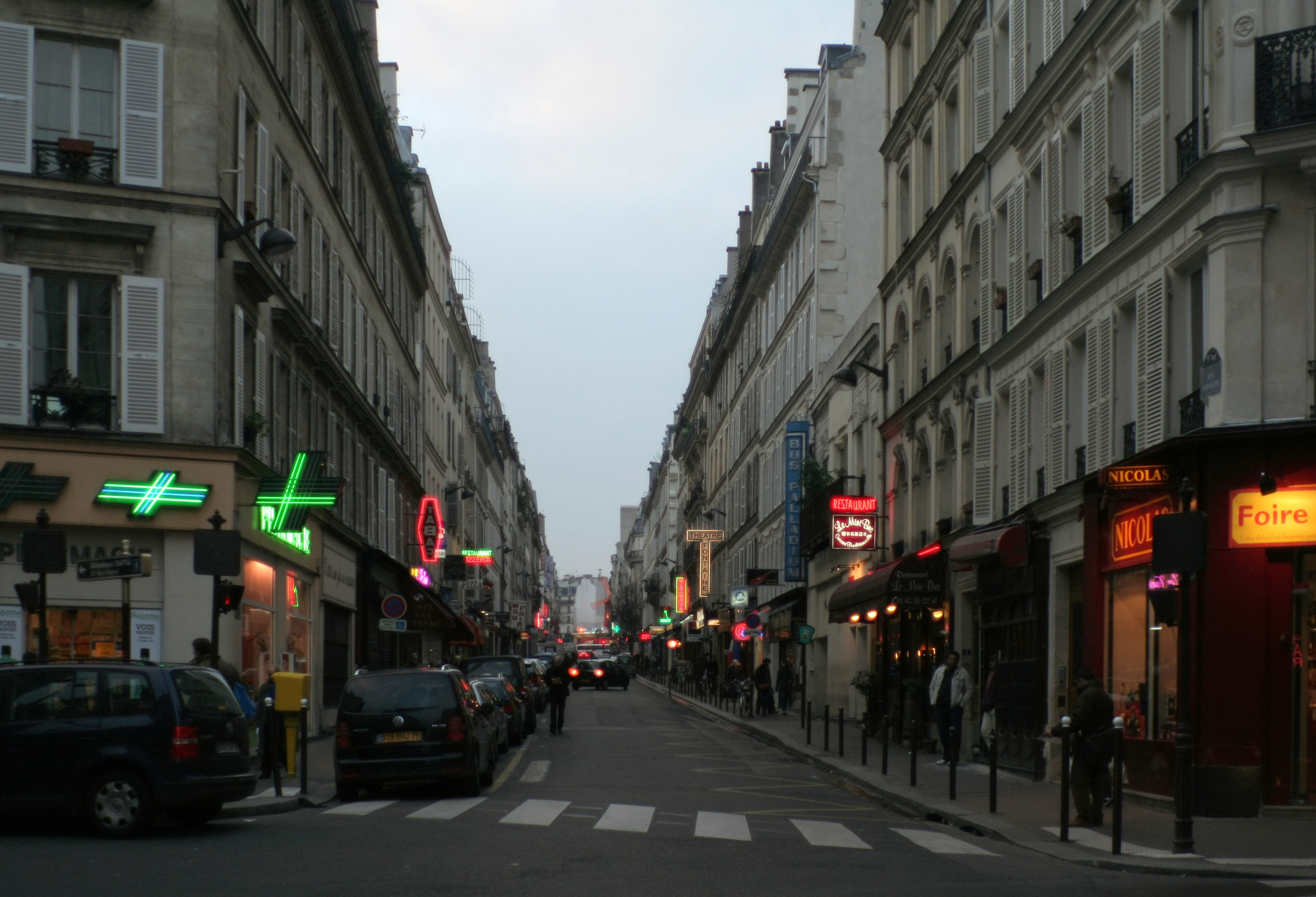
Rue Fontaine, the street where Le Carrousel de Paris was originally located.

Le Carrousel de Paris was a Parisian cabaret most famous for its 1950s revues of cross-dressing (travesti) and trans performers such as Coccinelle. It definitively ceased its dinner-show activity in 2016.

== History ==
=== Beginnings ===
In 1926, at 40 Rue Fontaine near Moulin Rouge, the impresario and alleged count Giuseppe "Pepito" Abatino, created the cabaret Chez Joséphine for his star Josephine Baker. Even before the house became a restaurant-show, it was frequented by guests such as Jean Cocteau, Robert Desnos, Colette, and René Clair. When it became a cabaret/café-théâtre, it hosted performers such as debutante Charles Trenet, Édith Piaf, Léo Ferré, as well as Gilbert Bécaud who worked there as pianist-accompanist.

=== Le Carrousel ===
Manager of Madame Arthur, Marcel Ouizman took over Le Carrousel de Paris in October 1947, moving it to a basement on 40 Rue du Colisée, near the Champs-Élysées. Le Carrousel was established with the intention to cater to a higher calibre of clients (richer and largely heterosexual) than Madame Arthur - where the feminine performances were more overtly comedic than those at Le Carrousel.

In 1952 Coccinelle, having previously performed at Madame Arthur, became a star at Le Carrousel de Paris and it was during this decade that Le Carrousel became Paris's "first transexual cabaret". Le Carrousel's female impersonator troupe was made up of Bambi, April Ashley, Péki d'Oslo, Cappucine, Kiki Moustic, Les-Lee, Fétiche, Coco, Sonne Teal, Rita del Oro, Doriana, Chou Chou, and others. Many of the troupe termed themselves 'real' travesti (i.e. transgender women) and information surrounding gender affirmation circulated between the performers. Several including Coccinelle and April Ashley travelled to Casablanca in Morocco to have sex reassignment surgery performed by Georges Burou.

The programmes at Le Carrousel usually included a head shot of the performer's male persona in the corner of the glamour photograph – even for trans women such as Coccinelle and Bambi.

In 1959, Le Carrousel was featured in the documentary film Europa di notte.

1947 – 1961 mark the golden years of Le Grande Carrousel, when the nightclub was one of the most expensive clubs in Paris.

==== Legal issues and closures ====
The cabaret saw many closures over the years starting in February 1949, where the prefecture announced an edict banning "travesti attractions or shows" which were "facilitat[ing] perversion and acts of debauchery". The management initially conceded and in response, some performers began to take hormones and grow their hair to avoid being accused of cross-dressing. It is assumed that the police were paid off since the venue continued to remain open, however there was a police presence outside the club which ensured its arriving performers were dressed 'as men'.

Neighbors threatened legal action and forced Le Carrousel de Paris to close, with Ouizman reopening the cabaret only in 1951 on the street floor.

In 1954 the police made Le Carrousel de Paris close for three months, and banned Madame Arthur from male cross-dressing.

Around this time Ouizman opened another Carrousel in Juan-les-Pins on the French Riviera, and went to court to object to the police regulations that made his business illegal, winning the case. However he was forced to close Le Carrousel de Paris 31 December 1961.

=== Reopening and resurgence ===
Le Carrousel reopened less than a year later in a smaller place at 22 Rue Vavin, between Montparnasse and the Jardin du Luxembourg.

In 1963 Le Carrousel's troupe of trans performers visited Japan. Their performance at the Golden Akasaka nightclub in Minatoku, Tokyo ran between 21 November - 28 December and they returned in 1964 and 1965. Their presence there gave birth to the Japanese term "blue boys", which would later refer generically to transgender women, especially those who had had surgery. Following Le Carrousel's visit, several touristic "show bars" started to appear in the country.

The cabaret was hurt when on 5 March 1966 Canadian entertainer Sonne Teal and four other members of the Le Carrousel Japanese tour died in a plane crash near Mount Fuji. This incident in turn was the inspiration for the novela Cobra by Severo Sarduy.

=== 1980s onwards ===
In 1985, Le Carrousel de Paris changed address, from rue Vavin to 40 rue Fontaine, opposite Place Blanche, replacing the former Embassy club. François Mitterrand unwillingly helped promote the club by opening Carrousel du Louvre, creating a confusion between two places among some tourists. The troupe of female impersonators of Madame Arthur moved to Carrousel de Paris, and in 1990, a new revue inspired by Paradis Latin premiered. Le Carrousel de Paris also started to host shows of comedians such as Olivier Lejeune, Gérald Dahan, Bernard Mabille, Vincent Lagaf' and Michel Leeb.

In 1996, Valério Berkovics bought Le Carrousel de Paris from the Madame Arthur group. He would run it for 12 years until 2008, when the cabaret changed hands again; it was bought in June 2010 by the company SNCP, under the direction of Simone Lumbroso. The Cabaret definitely ceased its activity in 2016, with plans to make it a cocktail bar sans live performances, that would still keep the name of Le Carrousel.
