= Bambi (2013 film) =

- Directed by: Sébastien Lifshitz
- Produced by: Sébastien Lifshitz
- Starring: Marie-Pierre Pruvot
- Release date: 2013
- Country: France
- Language: French

Bambi is a French documentary film, released in 2013 and directed by Sébastien Lifshitz.

== Summary ==
The film is a profile of Marie-Pierre Pruvot, an Algerian-born trans woman who had a long and prominent career as a dancer and showgirl in Paris in the 1950s and 1960s, under the stage name Bambi, before becoming a high school teacher.

== Accolades ==
The film won the Teddy Award for Best Documentary Film at the 2013 Berlin International Film Festival.
