= Thérèse Clerc =

French militant feminist

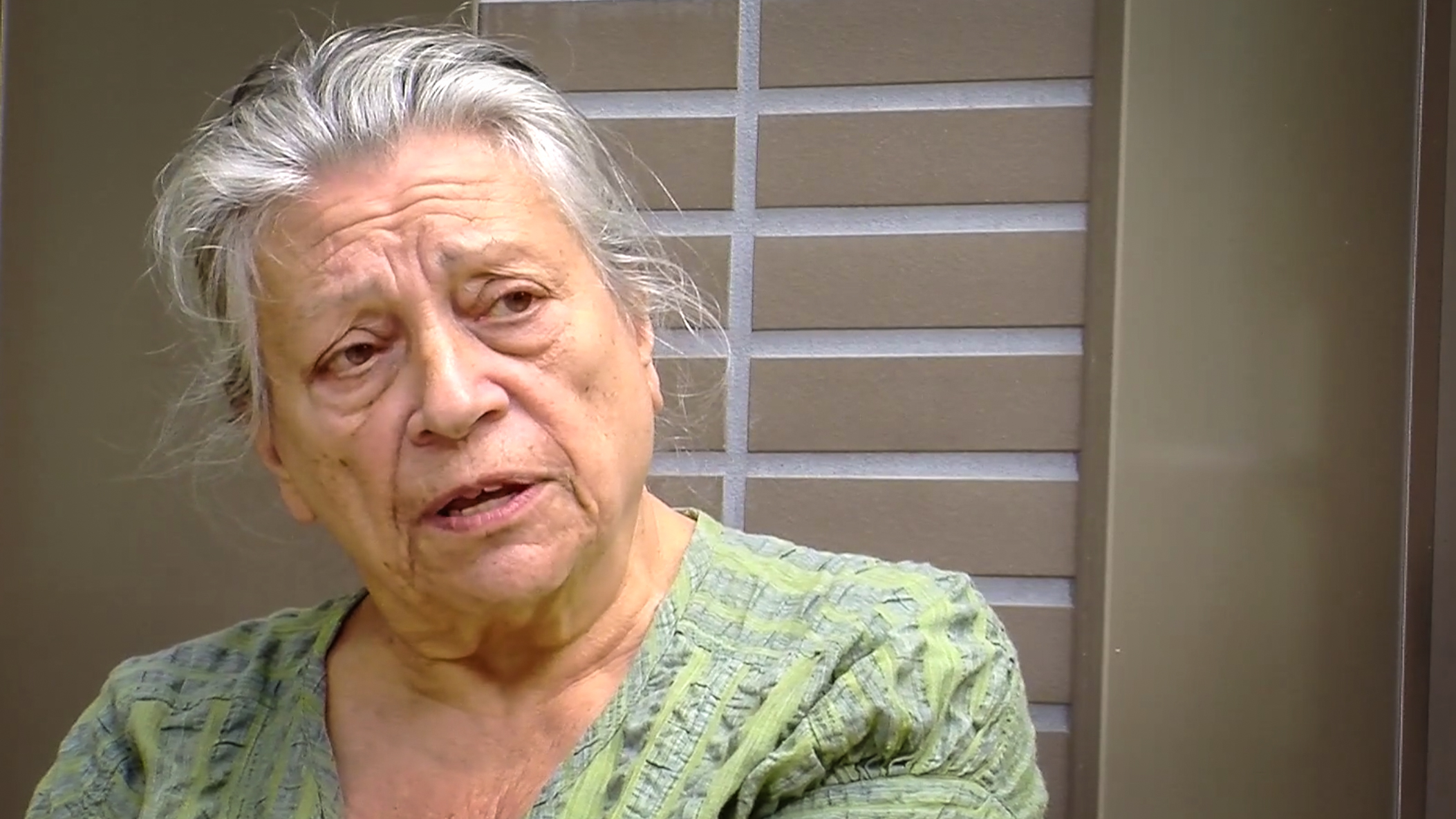
Thérèse Clerc (2014)

Thérèse Clerc (1927–2016) was a French militant feminist who was active principally in the city of Montreuil. A member of the Movement for Freedom of Abortion and Birth Control (Mouvement pour la liberté de l'avortement et de la contraception, MLAC), she performed clandestine abortions for women in difficulty in her small Montreuil apartment until 1975, when abortions were legalized under the Veil Law. In 2000, she founded the Maison des Femmes: a cultural, social and feminist center for women who had been the victims of violence, later renamed Maison Thérèse Clerc. For many years, Clerc fought for the establishment of a self-managed home for elderly women in Montreuil, finally succeeding with the Maison des Babayagas in 2013.

== Biography ==
Born on 9 December 1927, Thérèse was brought up in a middle-class home in the city of Bagnolet where her father worked for a bookmaking company. After entering the hatmaking trade, she married an industrial cleaning entrepreneur when she was 20. With four children to care for, she became a housewife. As a catholic, she was selling the weekly journal named « Témoignage chrétien » and meeting priests workers back from military service in Algeria. « I met Marx in the church on Charonne street » as she said. However, the Church position about women drove her away from it. Nevertheless, at the end of her life, she admitted being more agnostic than atheist even maybe believer (God is a « questioning because he’s not demonstrable. God is credible only in doubt, I find it fun » she is declaring).

In the 1960s, she worked in a department store. She took part in demonstrations against the wars in Indochina and Algeria and became an activist in favour of legalized abortions as a member of the MLAC. On obtaining a divorce in 1969, she bought a small apartment in Montreuil where she performed clandestine abortions until the Veil Law was adopted in 1975.

In 2000, Clerc founded the Maison des Femmes in Montreuil, dedicated to assisting women who had faced violence to re-integrate into normal life. She went on to establish a self-managed retirement home in 2007. The Maison des Babayagas provided facilities for elderly women, encouraging them to live together freely and constructively. In addition, maintaining that it was never to late to learn, she founded a university for older people. Open to all, her Université des Savoirs sur la Vieillesse (UNISAVIE) was the first of its kind.

In 2008, in the presence of Simone Veil, she was honoured with the Legion of Honour.

Thérèse Clerc died in Montreuil on 16 February 2016.
