= Marie-Pierre Pruvot =

French transgender woman (born 1935)

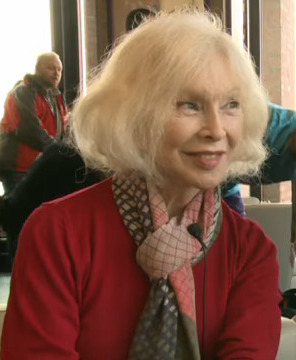
- Pruvot in 2013
- Born: November 11, 1935 (age 90); Isser, Kabylie, Algeria
- Other names: Bambi, Marie-Pier Ysser
- Education: Sorbonne
- Occupations: Entertainer, teacher, author
- Awards: Ordre des Palmes Académiques
- Website: bambi-officiel.com

Marie-Pierre Pruvot, also known under the pseudonym Marie-Pier Ysser (French: [maʁi pjɛʁ pʁyvo]; born 11 November 1935), is a French transgender woman who performed under the stage name Bambi. She performed in a transgender showgirl revue at Le Carrousel de Paris for approximately 20 years.

While performing regularly, she appeared in several documentaries, including the 1959 film Costa Azzurra, directed by Vittorio Sala and the 1963 film 90 notti in giro per il mondo, directed by Mina Loy. During her entertainment career, she acquired university degrees at the Sorbonne in Paris, subsequently becoming a teacher of literature in 1974. She was initially appointed in Cherbourg; two years later, she began teaching at Garges-lès-Gonesse, and remained there for the next 25 years. She was honored with induction into the Ordre des Palmes Académiques.

She was profiled in Sébastien Lifshitz's documentary film Bambi, which won the Teddy Award for Best Documentary Film at the 2013 Berlin International Film Festival.

== Autobiographies ==
- Pruvot, Marie-Pierre (2003). J'inventais ma vie. Éditions Osmondes, ASIN B006X19N58
- Pruvot, Marie-Pierre (2007). Marie parce que c'est joli. Éditions Bonobo
