= FTA receiver =

Receiver designed to receive unencrypted broadcasts

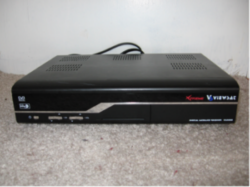
A Viewsat Xtreme FTA receiver

A free-to-air or FTA Receiver is a satellite television receiver designed to receive unencrypted broadcasts. Modern decoders are typically compliant with the MPEG-4/DVB-S2 standard and formerly the MPEG-2/DVB-S standard, while older FTA receivers relied on analog satellite transmissions which have declined rapidly in recent years.

== Uses ==
=== Mainstream broadcast programming ===
In some countries, it is common for mainstream broadcasters to broadcast their channels over satellite as FTA. Most notably, in the German-speaking countries, most of the main terrestrial broadcasters, such as ARD Das Erste and ZDF offer FTA satellite broadcasts, as do some of the more recent satellite rivals such as Sat.1 and RTL. The satellites on which these channels broadcast, at Astra's 19.2° ea position, are receivable throughout most of Europe.

In the UK, all the original five terrestrial broadcasters, BBC One, BBC Two, ITV, Channel 4, and Five broadcast FTA on digital satellite in some form.

=== Ethnic and religious programming ===
FTA receivers are sold in the United States and Canada for the purpose of viewing unencrypted free-to-air satellite channels, the bulk of which are located on Galaxy 19 (97°W, K_{u} band). There is also a substantial amount of Christian-based programming available on several satellites over both North America and Europe, such as The God Channel, JCTV, EWTN, and 3ABN.

=== Educational programming ===
The PBS Satellite Service offers educational programming on K_{u} band DVB from the AMC-21 satellite (125°W). As there is no standard MPEG audio on many of these channels, the AC3-only feeds require a Dolby Digital-capable receiver. They are otherwise free. Channels include PBS-HD/PBS-X as well as various secondary programmes normally carried on digital subchannels of PBS terrestrial member stations.

The main PBS New York feed is absent from the free-to-air version of the PBS satellite service to afford local terrestrial member stations a chance to broadcast material before it becomes available on PBS-X or PBS-HD. Typically, PBS-X feeds carried programmes (except news) a day later than the main terrestrial PBS network.

=== US terrestrial broadcasters ===
Many of these channels carried programming from major network television affiliates, although these are disappearing, particularly on K_{u}-band.

Equity Broadcasting used one K_{u} band (Galaxy 18, 123°W) and one C-band satellite feed as a key part of its Equity C.A.S.H. centralcasting operation; many small UHF local stations were fed from one central point in Little Rock, Arkansas via free-to-air satellite. Most were members of secondary terrestrial networks, including both US English- and Spanish-language broadcasters, and content from satellite broadcasts often fed over-the-air digital subchannels of terrestrial stations. Programming such as the Retro Television Network or Retro Jams had been provided at various times; music video broadcasters Mas Música and The Tube were formerly available at 123°W before being taken over (Mas Música is now MTV3) or ceasing operations.

Similarly, unencrypted K_{u} band satellite television was also used temporarily in the aftermath of 2005's Hurricane Katrina as a means to feed NBC programming into New Orleans from the studios of an out-of-state broadcaster; the feeds contained the content, branding and station identification of the damaged New Orleans station in a form suitable for direct feed to a transmitter (with no further studio processing) in the target market.

Paradoxically, many Equity-owned local UHF stations obtained solid national satellite coverage despite small terrestrial LPTV footprints that barely covered their nominal home communities. In many cases, this brought smaller networks and Spanish-language broadcasting to communities which otherwise would have no free access to this content.

As television market statistics for these stations from firms such as Nielsen Media Research are based on counting viewership within the footprint of the corresponding terrestrial signal, television ratings severely underestimated or failed to estimate the number of households receiving programming such as Univision from FTA satellite feeds. The liquidation of Equity Broadcasting's station group in mid-2009 greatly reduced the number of US terrestrial stations available from K_{u} band free-to-air satellite; while a very small handful of uplinked terrestrial stations remain free (mostly on C-band, which requires a much larger antenna) these are from other, independent sources.

=== Rural and hobby use ===
Over-the-air digital TV signals do not reach very far outside the city in which they are transmitted. FTA receivers can be used in rural locations as a fairly reliable source of television without subscribing to cable or a major satellite provider.

Terrestrial broadcasters use some of the nearly 30 North American satellites to transmit their feeds for internal purposes. These unencrypted feeds can then be received by anyone with the proper decoder. Satellite signals are normally receivable well beyond the terrestrial station's coverage area. Enthusiasts also use FTA receivers to watch the numerous wildfeeds that are present on many of those satellites.

In theory, a viewer in Glendive, Montana (the smallest North American TV market) could have received what little local CBS and NBC programming is available terrestrially, alongside a K_{u} band free-to-air dish for additional commercial networks (such as individual ABC and Fox TV affiliates from Equity Broadcasting, formerly at 123°W) and educational programming (PBS Satellite Service at 125°W). There is no assurance that any individual FTA broadcast will remain available or that those which do remain will continue broadcast in a compatible format – in this example, such a viewer would have lost ABC and Fox in mid-2009 due to Equity's bankruptcy.

=== Signal piracy ===
Free-To-Air receivers generally use the same technology standards (such as DVB-S, MPEG-2) as those used by pay-TV networks such as Echostar's Dish Network and BCE's Bell Satellite TV. FTA receivers, however, lack the smartcard readers or decryption modules designed for the reception of pay-TV programming, since the receivers are designed only for reception of unencrypted transmissions.

On occasion, where a pay-TV service's encryption system has been very seriously compromised, to the extent that it can be emulated in software and without the presence of a valid access card, hackers have been able to reverse-engineer an FTA receiver's software and add the necessary emulation to allow unauthorized reception of pay TV channels. Manufacturers, importers, and distributors of FTA receivers officially do not condone this practice and some will not sell to or support individuals who they believe will be using their products for this purpose, use of third-party software usually voiding any warranties.

Unlike traditional methods of pirate decryption that involve altered smart cards used with satellite receivers manufactured and distributed by the provider, piracy involving FTA receivers require only an update to the receiver's firmware. Electronic countermeasures that disable access cards may not have the same or any effect on FTA receivers because they are not capable of being updated remotely. The firmware in receivers themselves cannot be overwritten with malicious code via satellite as provider-issued receivers are.

FTA receivers also have the advantage of being able to receive programming from multiple providers plus legitimate free-to-air DVB broadcasts which are not part of any package, a valuable capability which is conspicuously absent from most "package receivers" sold by DBS providers. DVB-S is an international standard and thus the industry-imposed restriction that a Bell TV receiver is not interchangeable with a Dish Network receiver (the same box) and neither are interchangeable with a GlobeCast World TV receiver (also DVB) is an artificial one created by providers and not respected by either pirates or legitimate unencrypted FTA viewers.

Periodically, a provider will change the processes in which its encryption information is sent. When this happens, illegitimate viewing is disrupted. Third-party coders may release an updated altered version of the FTA receiver software on internet forums, sometimes hours to days after the countermeasure is implemented, although some countermeasures have allowed the encryption to remain secure for several months or longer. The receivers, meanwhile, remain able to receive unencrypted DVB-S broadcasts and (for some HDTV models) terrestrial ATSC programming. The same is not true of standard subscription TV receivers, whereby unsubscribing from a pay-TV package causes loss of all channels.

The use of renewable security allows providers to send new smart cards to all subscribers as existing compromised encryption schemes (such as Nagravision 1 and 2) are replaced with new schemes (currently Nagravision 3). This "card swap" process can provide pay-TV operators with more effective control over pirate decryption, but at the expense of replacing smart cards in all existing subscribed receivers. While this approach is used by most providers, deployments tend to be slowed due to cost.

While smart-card piracy often involves individuals who re-program access cards for others (usually for a price), piracy using FTA receivers involves third-party software that is relatively easy to upload to the receiver and can even be uploaded using a USB device, network, or serial link (a process called "flashing"). Most such firmware is distributed freely on the Internet. Websites that third-party coders use to share this software often have anywhere from 50,000 to over 200,000 registered users.

Another method of pirate decryption that has become popular recently is known as Internet Key Sharing (IKS). This is accomplished by an Ethernet cable hooked to the receiver that allows updated decryption keys to be fed to the unit directly from the internet. The DVB-S common scrambling system and the various conditional access systems are based on the use of a legitimately subscribed smart cards which generates a continuous stream of cryptographic keys usable to decrypt one channel on a receiver. A key-sharing scheme operates by redistributing these keys in real-time to multiple receivers in an unlimited number of locations so that one valid smartcard may serve almost 10000 viewers.

As of June 2009 this was the only active pirate decryption system still in widespread use in North American satellite TV, due to the shutdown of the compromised Nagravision 2 system by providers such as Dish Network and Bell TV.

However, this is limited by the interval of the stream of keys or also called CW (Control Words). Usually, the interval for the renewal of the CWs is ±10 seconds, but other systems (i.e. NDS3) have CW intervals of 5 seconds or less. Each channel usually has a different set of CWs for decryption and thus each box currently watching a specific channel must periodically request the current CWs from the server/smart-card for that specific channel. So arguably, the sharing of the card might not be unlimited. There are some restrictions to this like the frequency of CW changes and also the latency of the network. If the CWs do not arrive in time, there could be a freeze or crackle in the picture.

There are of course other more costly possibilities like having several legitimately subscribed cards each handling a few channels and a CW caching server.

The dependence on an external server also compromises privacy for individual viewers, as well as rendering the system incompatible with many receiver models which lack the ability to connect to an outside network and/or lack the ability to set or modify the various keys or identifiers used in communication between the card and receiver.

== Common features ==
=== Installation menu ===
This is the main control panel that allows the user to configure the receiver to interact with LNBs, switches, motors, and other equipment. The user selects the LNB type, local oscillator frequency, appropriate DiSEqC switch port, and motor configuration. If all the settings are correct for the appropriate equipment, a signal bar showing strength and quality will appear. At that point, the receiver can be used to scan the satellite to detect channels.

=== Blind scan ===
There are 63 satellites in orbit over the Americas, 57 over Europe and a further 64 over Asia, a significant number of which will be receivable from any one location. Each of these has a different number of active transponders. Each transponder operates at a different frequency and symbol rate. Many FTA receivers are designed to detect any active transponders and any channels on those transponders. Because they are designed to do this without needing to be pre-programmed with the transponder information for each satellite, this process is referred to as a "blind" scan—as opposed to a satellite scan, which scans according to pre-set transponder values.

=== Channel edit/sort ===
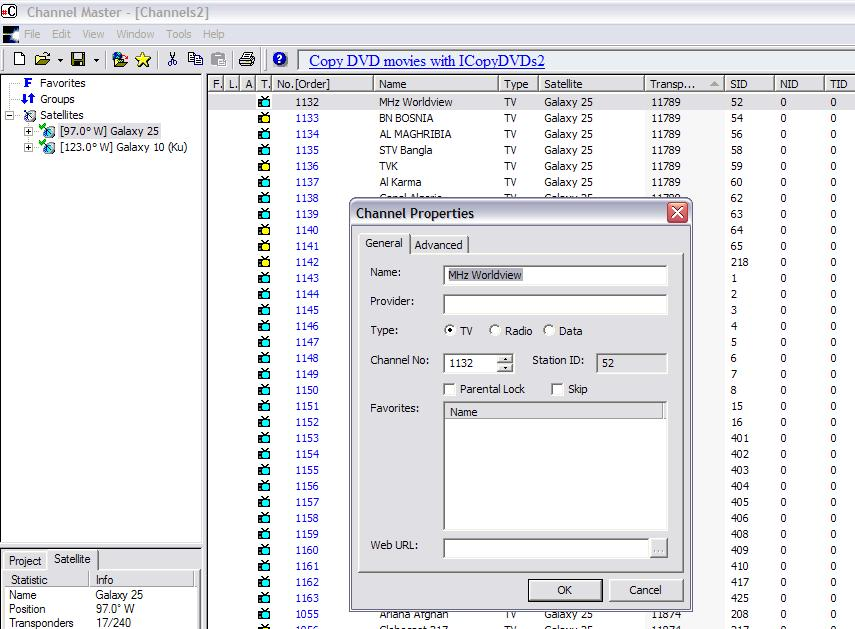
Channel Master editor

Once a scan is complete, the channels can often be sorted alphabetically, in satellite/transponder order, or in scrambled/unscrambled order. Additionally, third-party software often allows the option of sorting by the channel's Station Identification (SID) number. This is so that the individual channels can be numbered in a way that mimics the lineup of Dish Network or Bell TV. Channels can also be renamed or deleted, either in an on-screen menu or with external software.

The most popular software used to configure and sort channels was a database program called Channel Master, which allowed the user to name, number, sort, and delete channels and then save them in a format that can then be written to the receiver. The file created that contains channel information is called a channel list. This channel editor application is not affiliated with the similarly-named antenna manufacturer and appears to have last been updated in 2008. Many older and discontinued receiver models are supported in Channel Master, though most newer and less popular ones are not.

=== User settings ===
Most FTA receivers give the user the option of configuring the language, aspect ratio, TV type (NTSC/PAL), and time settings.

Typically, most FTA receivers can accept an MPEG2 video stream in either PAL-compatible (540/704/720 x 576) or NTSC-compatible (640 x 480) image formats and convert it for display on either a PAL or NTSC monitor. There is some loss of image data due to NTSC's lower resolution. Some receivers also support output to SCART, S-Video, HDMI or component video.

=== Parental control ===
All FTA receivers contain a parental lock feature.

=== DiSEqC switch and motor control ===
Unlike package receivers promoted for use with a limited number of satellites controlled by an individual pay-TV provider, an FTA receiver is designed to be capable of receiving any free signals from all available satellites visible in a given location. To fully exploit this capability, most K_{u} band FTA receivers will control a DiSEqC motor which can rotate a single dish to view one of any number of multiple satellites.

An alternate approach of pointing a fixed dish (or LNB) at each satellite to be received (then feeding the individual signals into a remotely controlled switch) is compatible both with standard FTA receivers and the more-restricted pay-TV "package receiver". The most common standard for use with FTA receivers is a DiSEqC switch which normally allows automatic selection of signal from four satellites. A simpler two-position remote switch operated by a 22 kHz tone is also occasionally used for North American reception, but this configuration is not compatible with European-style universal LNB's which use the tone internally for band-switching.

A toroidal antenna may be used with multiple LNB's to receive multiple satellites in various locations over a 40° arc. Unlike the single parabola of a standard satellite dish antenna (which is best adapted to focus one target satellite to a single point), the toroidal antenna uses a reflector pair to focus multiple signals to a line.

Individual adjacent or near-adjacent pairs (such as Glorystar on 97°W and 101°W) may be received, due to their close proximity, with two LNB's on what otherwise looks geometrically to be a standard parabolic dish. The outputs from these individual LNB's may then be fed through a switch to a receiver, providing access to all signals on both satellites.

=== Electronic program guide ===
An on-screen program schedule can be accessed that also contains descriptive information about a selected program. The availability and quality of programme guide information varies widely between broadcasters (some provide nothing) and the ability of receivers to collect and store guide listings from multiple sources is also variable. Receivers with more memory (or storage on external devices such as hard drives) are often, but not always, better equipped to store and retrieve on-screen programme listings. In some cases, a receiver with both satellite and terrestrial tuners will provide on-screen guide support for one mode of operation but not both.

=== PVR functions ===
A few high-end receivers feature the ability to record programs, pause, and review live TV. Often, a hard drive is not included when the unit is purchased, which allows the user to install any desired hard disk drive. Many newer units are equipped with a USB 2.0 port that allows the user to connect a portable hard drive; at least one unit (the Pansat 9200HD) uses external SATA as PVR media storage.

Some receivers, such as TripleDragon or Dream Multimedia's Linux-based Dreambox series, provide local area network interfaces. This allows the use of network-attached storage to provide PVR-like functions (some of these models also include internal hard drives or USB) and allows the unit to be controlled or updated via network.

The use of desktop personal computer cards to deploy DVB-S or terrestrial digital television tuners allows the computer's hard drive and network storage to be used to archive electronic programme guide information and recorded television programming. Most or all of the base PVR functionality becomes available by default at little or no added cost.

=== MPEG4 and 4:2:2 ===
Most standard FTA receivers support DVB-S, MPEG-2, 480i or 576i SDTV received as unencrypted QPSK from K_{u} band satellites.

Rarely supported by stand-alone FTA receivers, but likely to be supported by FTA DVB-S tuners for personal computers, are MPEG-4 and MPEG2 4:2:2, variants on the MPEG compression algorithm which provide more compression and more colour resolution, respectively. As personal computers handle much of the video decompression in software, any codec could be easily substituted on the desktop.

High-definition television is also beginning to be supported by a limited-number of high-end receivers; at least one high-end stand-alone receiver (the Quali-TV 1080IR) supports both 4:2:2 and HDTV.

4:2:2 is a version of MPEG-2 compression used in network feeds such as NBC on K_{u} band (103°W). Some broadcast networks use 4:2:2 encoding for otherwise-unencrypted transmission of sports events to local terrestrial stations, as it provides slightly better colour than the standard 4:2:0 compression.

In some cases support for additional standards (such as DVB-S2, MPEG-4 and 8PSK) will also become necessary to receive a viewable signal. The use of newer means of modulation and compression is likely to become more widespread for high-definition television feeds, to partially offset the larger amount of transponder space required to deliver high-definition video to television stations.

=== Terrestrial DTV ===
In countries using the DVB-T and DVB-C standards for terrestrial digital television and digital cable, a few higher-end receivers provide an option to install terrestrial DVB tuners either alongside or in place of the stock DVB-S tuner. Dream Multimedia's DreamBox series, for instance, supports this in a few selected models.

In countries using ATSC, inclusion of terrestrial tuners in DVB-S FTA receivers is rare, with one key exception. Some HDTV FTA receivers incorporate terrestrial ATSC tuners. These typically do not support ATSC's unique major.minor digital subchannel numbering scheme or the on-screen program guide but are capable of displaying (or timeshifting) local HDTV with no loss in detail. Channels from these receivers are numbered using FTA conventions, by which the first channel found is most often arbitrarily given channel 1 as its virtual channel number.

=== HDTV ===
A few high-end receivers feature HDTV. In North America, these often include an ATSC over-the-air digital television tuner and MPEG-4 support. A few HDTV units allow for the addition of a UHF remote control. However, an 8PSK module can be installed in place of the UHF remote and allows the receiver to decode the format used on most Dish Network high definition programming.

These units are superior to DVD recorders for time-shifting HDTV programming, as most DVD units down-convert OTA HDTV signals to standard-definition to match the limitations of the DVD standard. An HDTV FTA receiver with ATSC capability and USB storage can record one channel from a terrestrial or satellite DTV transport stream entirely losslessly, although the on-screen guide for terrestrial reception is often limited and viewing or storage of analog NTSC channels is not supported.

== Controversy ==
=== Availability of free programming ===
While significant amounts of programming remain free, there is no assurance to viewers that any individual broadcast currently available free-to-air will remain so. Some will inevitably move to incompatible signal formats (such as MPEG 4:2:2, 8PSK, DVB-S2, or MPEG-4), change from free to encrypted, move to different satellite locations (often across bands, where C band reception requires much larger antennae) or shut down entirely.

Many of the signals are backhaul or "wildfeed" video destined to individual stations, or are feeds to terrestrial transmitters programmed remotely. These were not intentionally created as direct satellite broadcasts to home viewers, but often had been left unencrypted (in the clear) on the assumption that few people were watching. As free-to-air receivers became inexpensive and widely deployed in the 2000s, many of these feeds moved to C band (requiring a huge dish), were encrypted or changed to incompatible modulation or encoding standards which required more advanced receivers, even though the corresponding terrestrial television broadcast may still be free-to-air in its home community.

The onus is on receiver vendors to voluntarily indicate, whenever they use lists of currently available FTA programming for marketing purposes, that free channels frequently may appear, move and disappear, often on a permanent basis, with no advance notice. One North American example was Equity Broadcasting, once a major source of small local terrestrial stations on free satellite television. Equity filed for Chapter 11 bankruptcy on 9 December 2008, and most of Equity's terrestrial stations were sold at auction in mid-2009. As many of the stations (such as New York state's WNGS and WNYI) were sold to Daystar and now originate nothing, the corresponding unique free-to-air signals (Galaxy 18, 123°W) are no more. Even where a signal still exists, an incompatible signal format such as that of the NBC feeds (AMC 1 at 103°W, now requires 8PSK, DVB-S2 and HDTV support to receive anything) can remove a channel from virtually all standard FTA receivers.

=== Receiver obsolescence ===
Many receivers will provide options for hardware expansion (such as to add 8PSK reception or DVB Common Interface TV subscription cards) and firmware upgrade (either officially or from nominally third-party sources). Most often, once the individual receiver model is discontinued, this support and expandability rapidly disappears from all sources. The migration of existing feeds to formats such as MPEG-4, HDTV, or DVB-S2 (which many current receivers do not support) may also result in viewers losing existing free programming as equipment becomes rapidly obsolete. Unlike digital terrestrial set-top boxes, most standard-definition DVB-S receivers do not down-convert HD programming and thus produce no usable video for these signals.

There have also been incidents where existing receiver designs have been "cloned" or copied by competing manufacturers; a manufacturer will often reduce support for a widely copied receiver design. In some cases, malware has been released, ostensibly in the same format as existing third-party firmware, in an attempt to interfere with the further use of a widely cloned receiver's design.

=== Legal issues ===
FTA receivers are ostensibly designed for free-to-air use but can be adapted for other purposes. In some jurisdictions, this dual-use nature can cause problems. Thus, combatting piracy involving FTA receivers has been difficult using legal means.

== Popular brands ==
- Ariza
- AzAmerica
- AZBox
- Buzz
- Captain
- CaptiveWorks
- Conaxsat
- Coolsat
- CubeRevo
- Digiwave
- DGStation
- Dreambox
- Dreamlink
- ExtremeView
- Fortec Star
- Goldsat
- GTMedia
- Hansen
- IPbox
- Humax
- KBox
- Matrix
- Neosat
- istar
- Neusat
- NFusion
- Pansat
- Pioline
- Powercoms
- Samsat
- Satopia
- Sezam
- Shibei
- Skyview
- Sonicview
- Starview
- Tanaka
- Technomate
- Topfield
- Traxis
- Venus
- Viewsat
- Visionsat
- Vizyon
- Vu+ (VuPlus)
- Wingsatt
- Starsat
- Iclass

== Peripheral equipment ==
- Satellite dish
- LNB
- DiSEqC
- Universal Satellites Automatic Location System

== See also ==
- Digital television adapter
