= Signal theft =

Signal theft is a term used by pay television vendors to denounce various schemes used to obtain a signal for free, usually in connection with satellite or cable TV service. See:

- Card sharing
- Pirate decryption
- Cable television piracy
