= Globecast =

French media services company

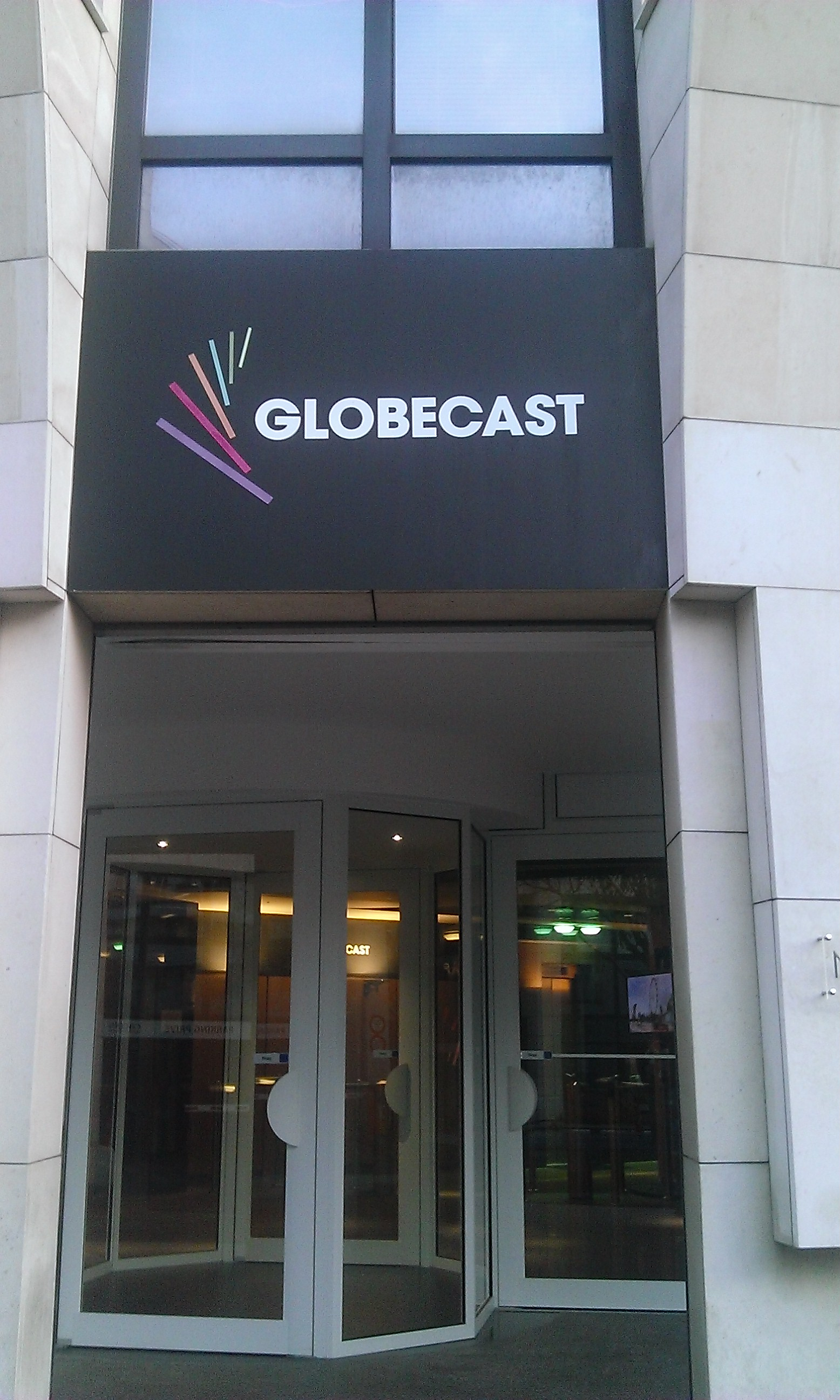
- Company type: Subsidiary
- Industry: Telecommunications, Broadcasting
- Founded: 1996; 30 years ago
- Headquarters: Issy-les-Moulineaux, France
- Key people: Christian Pinon, Olivier Barberot, Philippe Bernard
- Products: Media processing and transmission services for television broadcasters and content owners
- Parent: Orange S.A.
- Website: www.globecast.com

Globecast is a French company providing services for the radio, television and media industry. It delivers television channels from their origins to their audience (distribution) and brings live video feeds from events’ venues (stadiums, studios, satellite news gathering trucks...) to television broadcasters (contribution).

These services are feeding various television and radio platforms: direct-broadcast satellite (DBS), digital terrestrial television (DTT), cable TV, IPTV, TV for internet connected screens (OTT TV), digital signage networks, cinema theaters (DCP and live events delivery). Globecast serves the top 100 television broadcasters in the world.

Globecast has an established presence in Europe (Paris, London, Rome), America (Westlake Village, CA), Asia (Singapore), Africa (Johannesburg) and Middle-East (Beirut), through nineteen points of presence, among them twelve satellite telecommunication teleports and technical operation centers, all of them linked via an international terrestrial telecommunication network.

The company is fully owned by Orange. It is currently led by Philippe Bernard (previous CEO was Olivier Barberot; and before him Christian Pinon, Alain Baget, Michel Combes).

In 2013, Globecast changed its visual identity (logo) and its name lost the uppercase C (former writing was GlobeCast).

== History ==
- February 1992: France Telecom's subsidiary France Câble et Radio purchases the UK-based company Maxwell Satellite Communications Ltd (Maxat).
- 1996: the US-based company Keystone Communications is acquired by France Telecom.
- Autumn 1996: in France, activities of France Telecom in the broadcast industry are split between two new entities: Division Multimedia (DMM) and Division des Entreprises Audiovisuelles (DEA).

The DEA is composed by the TDF (TéléDiffusion de France) company and Direction des Transmissions Audiovisuelles (DTA). DTA will then become known as GlobeCast.

The DEA also covers:
1. the "Audiovisuel International" (AVI) marketing department of France Telecom Réseaux & Services Internationaux (FTRSI);
2. the shares of the following companies: 100% of Maxat (UK), 40% of Keystone (USA) and 20% of TIBA (Argentina);
3. the services of Direction des Opérations of TDF;
4. three operation centers of FTRSI, TDF and the Direction des réseaux Nationaux (DRN);
5. the "delegation of the image service", which purpose was the promotion of the Telecom 2 satellite.

- March 1997: The DTA is organized around an international coordination entity (DTA Worldwide) and three business units: DTA France, Maxat and Keystone, now fully controlled by DEA. DTA also buys IDB's assets, managed by Keystone since 1995.
- April 1997: The "corporate television" activities of France Câbles & Radio (subsidiary of France Telecom) are now part of DTA.
- April 1997: The whole business activities are now operated under the brand name of GlobeCast.
- June 1997: the UK-based company Maxat becomes GlobeCast UK
- September 1997: GlobeCast Asia is established in Singapore and becomes a new sales office of Globecast for the Asian market.
- January 1998: GlobeCast Italia is the new office of GlobeCast for serving the Italian and Swiss market, thanks to the partnership with Dominique Curchod Communication.
- February 1998: Hero Productions in Miami (USA) is purchased by Globecast. Activities of this subsidiary are television production and transmission. After merging it with Keystone, the name is changed to GlobeCast North America.
- June 1998: Majority of shares of Newsforce (South Africa) are purchased by Globecast. Newsforce is well established on the South African markets, with offices in Australia and Singapore.
- January 1999: GlobeCast Spain is incorporated in partnership with the Spanish group Mediapro.
- March 2000: GlobeCast Asia launches its full-time monitoring center and opens its booking call-center for handling the whole operations is Asia. During the September 11th 2001 events in NYC (USA), this entity is at the center stage for all related activities for all the GlobeCast group.
- June 2002: The DTA division of France Telecom is incorporated as GlobeCast France SAS and GlobeCast Holding, giving birth to the GlobeCast group.
- February 2003: GlobeCast India is incorporated.
- February 2003: Mediasat (Australia), specialised in satellite television transmission, is merged with the Australian offices of GlobeCast (formerly Newsforce), giving birth to GlobeCast Australia. GlobeCast has 50% of shares.
- January 2006: GlobeCast Spain is merged with Mediasat (subsidiary of Mediapro), including activities of Abertis Telecom in the broadcast industry, giving birth to Overon. GlobeCast has 12% of Overon, who becomes its Spanish partner. In January 2008, GlobeCast sells all its share to Mediapro.
- April 2007: The US-based GlobeCast Enterprise Services subsidiary is sold to Keystone Communications, while GlobeCast America continues to operate.
- June 2008: GlobeCast Asia enhances its presence by purchasing Pacific Century Matrix (Hong Kong). It is the fifth office and technical operation center in Asia (after Singapore, New Delhi, Beijing, Seoul).
- August 2008 : Nétia, a software editor for radio automation and media management, is purchased by GlobeCast, accelerating its transition toward the media management industry.
- April 2010 : GlobeCast Cinema Delivery is launched for the cinema theaters in France. It is a service to deliver digital cinema film copies to theaters via telecommunication networks.
- October 2010: GlobeCast purchases from Technicolor SA a television 'play-out' and post-production center, located in Singapore.
- September 2012: GlobeCast relaunches its OTT TV (over-the-top television) allowing broadcasters and TV bouquet operators to target multiscreen internet television users all around the world.
- September 2013: Globecast changes its visual identity, with a new logo and a name writing without the capital C.
- June 2015: Globecast Australia became a wholly owned subsidiary of Telstra Australia and in September 2015 was rebranded as Telstra Broadcast Services.
- January 2017: Nétia subsidiary is sold.
- March 2022: Signal to RT transmission was disrupted by Globecast as the 2022 Russian invasion of Ukraine happened, leaving downstream television network viewers unable to view the Russian channel, complying with European Union sanctions against Russia.
- July 2022: The French subsidiary Globecast Reportages is sold to Orange S.A. to join the Orange Events entity.
- April 2023: Globecast Americas announces moving to its new facility in Westlake Village Studios in California and closing its historical facility in Culver City, CA.

== SERTE ==
The technical operation center of Globecast in Paris (France), located at 61 rue des Archives, was for a long time known as SERTE. This name is still used sometimes by television professionals, even outside France, because it was used for many years. This technical center is a major routing node for television and radio feeds.

The SERTE acronym used to refer to: Service d'Exploitation Radio Télévision Extérieur (in English, Foreign radio and television operation center).

A brief history of SERTE:

- 1947: creation of Centre des Liaisons Radio-Électriques - CLR
- 1962: first satellite transmission operated at CLR
- 1980: CLR becomes SERTE, the national center, then international, for television and radio transmissions
- 1989: incorporation to the France Télécom group
- since 1980: it is one of the prime international hub for television and radio transmissions, either via satellite and terrestrial telecom networks
- 2002: GlobeCast is incorporated, including the technical operation center in Paris, rue des Archives (ex-SERTE)
- 2025: the technical facility of Globecast in Paris, Rue des Archives (previously known as SERTE) is closed. Operations are partially moved to public cloud and to Globecast datacenter in its facility of Saint-Assise (in Seine-Port). Employees are relocated to its headquarter’s office in Issy-les-Moulineaux.

== Digital cinema ==
In France, Globecast operates a service to deliver digital film copies (DCP) to theaters via terrestrial telecom networks.

== World TV and MyGlobeTV ==
In the US, Globecast operated a television bouquet via satellite under the name World TV and an internet television bouquet under the name MyGlobeTV.
