= GlobeCast World TV =

Defunct satellite television service

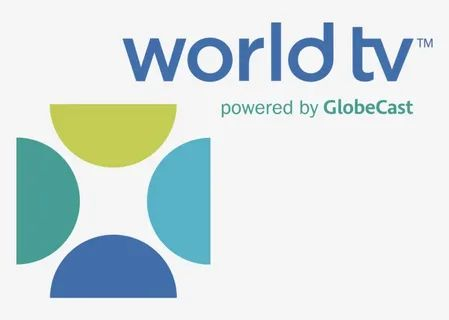
- Company type: Division of Globecast
- Industry: Telecommunications
- Headquarters: New York City, United States
- Area served: United States
- Products: Direct-broadcast satellite
- Owner: Globecast
- Parent: Orange S.A.
- Website: www.globecastwtv.com

GlobeCast World TV was a television via satellite service received in North America via the Galaxy 19 satellite, providing ethnic television and audio channels. It was a service by Globecast, a subsidiary of Orange. In North America, the satellite broadcasts dozens of Arabic and Asian channels.

The direct-to-home service was providing free-to-air and Nagravision-encrypted channels. The pay TV service was shut down at the end of 2013, but the free-to-air channels remain available on Galaxy 19. The brand World TV and the associated web site are now terminated.

In Europe, the GlobeCast World TV service was officially launched in June 2007, but was discontinued in 2008. It was received via Intelsat 905 satellite and was providing a bouquet of ethnic TV channels from India and Pakistan.

Also, in 2012 and 2013, Globecast operated MyGlobeTV, a set of Internet-delivered pay-TV ethnic packages to connected devices: Netgem Internet set-top-box, iOS and Android devices.

== Reception equipment ==
Free-to-air channels on Galaxy 19 can be received in most parts of the United States, including Hawaii and southern Canada with a 75 cm (30") diameter dish and any MPEG-2 DVB compliant free-to-air receiver.

Satellite receivers for the Glorystar system, which also uses Galaxy 19, can also tune in the FTA channels if the viewer scans the channels manually.

In converse, Glorystar channels, as well as other FTA channels on Galaxy 19, can be tuned with a GlobeCast receiver, if one knows the specific details, such as frequency, symbol rate, and polarization, obtainable from sources such as Lyngsat.

For pay channels, GlobeCast used to provide subscribers with GlobeCast WorldTV-labeled DVB-S receivers.

Between 2006 and 2009, GlobeCast provided receivers of model SE830 made by Taiwanese company Eastern Electronics Co., Ltd.

From 2009, GlobeCast also provided receivers of model Arion AF-2500 made by a Korean company Arion Technology Inc.

From 2011, GlobeCast also provided receivers with built-in Digital Video Recorder, model ZDS-801N, made by Zinwell.

== MyGlobeTV ==
In 2012, Globecast also began launching a direct to home alternative to satellite distribution through an OTT IPTV service called MyGlobeTV using the NetGem N8200 set top box. The MyGlobeTV service was discontinued in December 2013.

== See also ==
- Globecast
- Orange S.A.
- Galaxy 19
- Dish Network
- DirecTV
- FTA Receiver
