= Technomate =

Tech Declare Ltd.
- Type: Limited
- Industry: Electronics
- Founded: 2000
- Headquarters: London, United Kingdom
- Products: Set top boxes & related equipment
- Website: technomate.com

Technomate is an international satellite and terrestrial television equipment manufacturer based in Edmonton, London, England, that was founded in 2000.

Technomate sells satellite channel receiving equipment such as set-top boxes, DVB-S and DVB-T receivers, personal video recorders and home cinema units. Their receivers are often bought to receive European, Arabic and Asian channels not found on set top boxes designed for Sky and Freesat services, picking up channels from Hot Bird 1, Türksat 3A and Astra 1.
