= Timeline of Electronic Frontier Foundation actions =

The Electronic Frontier Foundation (EFF) is an international non-profit advocacy and legal organization based in the United States and serves its operations worldwide.

== 1990s ==
- July 10, 1990: EFF is founded and the groundwork is laid for the successful representation of Steve Jackson Games in a federal court case to prosecute the United States Secret Service for unlawfully raiding their offices and seizing computers.
- 1991: Steve Jackson Games v. United States Secret Service. EFF files in federal court.
- 1992: EFF gives first annual Pioneer Awards at 2nd Computers, Freedom and Privacy Conference in Washington, D.C.
- March 12th, 1993: Steve Jackson Games, Inc. v. United States Secret Service. Steve Jackson Games wins its case against the United States Secret Service.
- 1994: Center for Democracy and Technology is formed by Jerry Berman.
- 1994: Scientology v. the Internet.
- 1995: Bernstein v. United States. Ninth Circuit Court of Appeals rules in favor of Daniel J. Bernstein, holding that software source code is speech protected by the First Amendment and that the government's regulations preventing its publication were unconstitutional.
- 1995: EFF moves to San Francisco.
- 1995–1996: EFF opens its "Blue Ribbon Campaign" in direct response to the Communications Decency Act.
- 1996: EFF mounts its "Golden Key Campaign" to back calls for liberalisation of cryptography export laws
- 1996: EFF co-founds TRUSTe, the first Privacy Seal company, with CommerceNet, a non-profit industry consortium.
- 1998: EFF builds Deep Crack, a machine that decrypts a DES-encrypted message after only 56 hours of work, winning RSA Security's DES Challenge II-2.
- 1999: EFF and Anonymizer launch the Kosovo Privacy Project, an anonymous and secure email and Web surfing service conceived by Alex Fowler and Patrick Ball to ensure the protection of Kosovars, Serbs, and others reporting on the Kosovo War within the region from reprisal from Serbian officials.

== 2000s ==
- 2001: Felten v. RIAA. EFF supports Edward Felten in suing RIAA after Secure Digital Music Initiative (SDMI), RIAA, and Verance Corporation threaten Felten with legal action under the terms of the Digital Millennium Copyright Act (DMCA) over Felten's plan to present a paper about methods for defeating the SDMI watermarks. The case is dismissed.
- April 2002: EFF supports the Chilling Effects Clearinghouse effort to organize a database of IP law abuse and educate potential victims.
- November 2002: Universal v. Reimerdes ("2600 magazine case"). EFF loses its appeal before the Second Circuit Court of Appeals, establishing a legal precedent to permit prior restraint. 2600 magazine is restrained from publishing links to the Second Circuit code under provisions of the DMCA and declines to appeal to the Supreme Court.
- December 2003: RIAA v. Verizon, D.C. Cir. EFF supports Verizon Communications in a successful challenge to a lower court ruling holding that the company must reveal the identity of a Verizon customer accused of copyright infringement using the peer-to-peer file-sharing software Kazaa. The DC Circuit Court of Appeals agrees with Verizon and EFF that the special subpoena provisions in the DMCA apply to potentially infringing material stored on an ISP server, not material stored on an individual's own computer.
- 2004: DirecTV v. Treworgy, 11th Circuit. EFF helps defend "smart card" technology owner Mike Treworgy after DirecTV sued him based on the fact that he purchased hardware that could be used to intercept the company's satellite TV signals. Treworgy prevails in the 11th Circuit Court of Appeals, which finds that DirecTV cannot sue individuals for "mere possession" of smart-card technology. In separate negotiations with DirecTV, EFF succeeds in getting the company to drop its "guilt-by-purchase" litigation strategy altogether.
- 2004-02-18: EFF files amicus curiae brief in 1-800 Contacts, Inc. v. WhenU.Com and Vision Direct, Inc. appeal (see 1-800 Contacts)
- April 19, 2004: EFF initiates the Patent Busting Project to challenge "illegitimate patents that suppress non-commercial and small business innovation or limit free expression online"
- May 2004: Doe v. Ashcroft. EFF files amicus supporting ACLU's challenge to the constitutionality of 18 U.S.C. § 2709, which authorizes the FBI to compel the production of subscriber and communications records in the possession of a broad range of ISPs, potentially covering billions of records from tens of thousands of entities. These demands, known as National Security Letters, were issued without judicial oversight of any kind, yet allowed the FBI to obtain a vast amount of constitutionally protected information. In September 2004, Judge Victor Marrero of the Southern District of New York issues a landmark decision striking down the NSL statute and the associated gag provision.
- August 2004: Chamberlain v. Skylink. EFF helps defend Skylink in the Federal Circuit that puts limits on the controversial "anti-circumvention" provision of the DMCA. Chamberlain, the manufacturer of garage doors, invoked the provision to stop Skylink from selling a "universal" remote control that works with Chamberlain garage doors. The court rejected Chamberlain's claims, noting that if it adopted the company's interpretation of the DMCA, it would threaten many legitimate uses of software within electronic and computer products — something the law aims to protect.
- August 19, 2004: MGM v. Grokster. EFF prevails before the Ninth Circuit Court of Appeals with a decision affirming the "Betamax doctrine" — the rule following the Supreme Court's 1984 holding that a company that creates a technology cannot be held liable for copyright violations by users if the technology has substantial legal uses. The Ninth Circuit Court of Appeals rules that neither were liable for infringements by people using their software to distribute copyrighted works. However, on June 27, 2005 U.S. Supreme Court reverses, finding the defendants liable for copyright infringement, though the Court preserved the Betamax doctrine. Co-defendant Grokster eventually settles with MGM and disbands the company.
- October 6, 2004: EFF submits a brief in cooperation with eight other public interest organizations, challenging the FCC's authority to impose the broadcast flag mandate, which was to go into effect during July 2005.
- October 15, 2004: EFF successfully represents the non-profit ISP Online Policy Group (OPG) and two Swarthmore College students who published major security flaws in Diebold Election Systems (now Premier Election Solutions) voting machines. From the press release: "Diebold is the first company to be held liable for violating section 512(f) of the DMCA, which makes it unlawful to use DMCA takedown threats when the copyright holder knows that infringement has not actually occurred."
- 2004: JibJab Media v. Ludlow Music, N.D. Cal. EFF successfully defends JibJab, the creators of a parody flash animation piece using Woody Guthrie's "This Land Is Your Land", and uncovered evidence that the classic folk song is in fact already part of the public domain.
- November 2004: EFF files brief opposing the FCC's proposal to expand CALEA to broadband Internet access providers and VoIP systems.
- December 2004: EFF starts promoting and supporting Tor, a second generation Onion Routing network that allows people to communicate anonymously.
- June 2005: EFF issues a Legal Guide for Bloggers, designed to be a basic roadmap to the legal issues one may confront as a blogger, to let bloggers know their rights.
- October 2005: EFF investigates and documents how the Xerox DocuColor printer's serial number, as well as the date and time of the printout, are encoded in a repeating 15 by 8 dot pattern in the yellow channel on printed pages. EFF is working to reverse engineer additional printers. (see Printer steganography)
- November 2005: EFF files suit against Sony BMG — along with two leading national class action law firms — demanding that the company repair the damage done by Fortium Technologies (then First 4 Internet)'s XCP and SunnComm MediaMax CD-3 software it included on over 24 million music CDs (see 2005 Sony BMG CD copy prevention scandal).
- January 2006: Hepting v. AT&T. EFF files a class action lawsuit against AT&T alleging that AT&T allowed the NSA to potentially tap the entirety of its clients' Internet and Voice over IP communications.
- August 2006: EFF files a complaint with the Federal Trade Commission, accusing AOL of violating the Federal Trade Commission Act and asking for the FTC to take action. EFF alleges that AOL has engaged in deceptive and unfair trade practices with the disclosure of 20 million search queries of 650,000 anonymized users, intended for research purposes (see AOL for details). AOL is failing to "implement reasonable and appropriate measures to protect personal consumer information from public disclosure." Beyond that, AOL's failure to "employ proper security measures ... to protect personal consumer information from public disclosure" constitutes an unfair trade practice.
- November 2006: EFF files a lawsuit, on behalf of blogger Jeffrey Diehl, against Michael Crook, a webmaster Diehl claimed filed false DMCA claims against his and other websites. The case is settled in early 2007.
- October 2007: The United States Patent and Trademark Office accepted the EFF's request for the reexamination of NeoMedia's patent #6,199,048 that is alleged to threaten mobile information access.
- May 2007 files Sapient v. Geller
- August 2008: United States v. Arnold
- September 2008: Jewel v. NSA
- October 2008: Hepting v. AT&T

== 2010s ==
- December 2010: Following the United States diplomatic cables leak, the EFF offered support to WikiLeaks, with John Perry Barlow saying the EFF was 'trying to make sure they have plenty of mirror sites, back-ups, we're organising donations for them and generally doing everything we can to see that Wikileaks is not assailable by the methods that have been used against it so far'.
- June 2012: EFF started the Defend Innovation patent reform project.
- April 2015: EFF started the Fight215.org website to stop the mass surveillance enabled by Patriot Act.

== 2020s ==
- November 2020: EFF representing the developer of youtube-dl, a popular video archive utility software, to file a DMCA counter-notice to GitHub against RIAA.
