= Glorystar =

Religious satellite television service

GloryStar Satellite Systems is a direct to home religious based satellite television service. The service offers viewers and churches a selection of Christian radio and television services.

Glorystar broadcasts its channels via the Galaxy 19 K_{u} band satellite, which covers most of North and Central America, as well as the Caribbean.

All channels are religious, family friendly and distributed as non-encrypted or free-to-air (FTA) allowing viewers to receive programming without a monthly subscription fee.

== Technology ==
The reception of Glorystar programming requires reception of signals with a FTA receiver capable of receiving digital Ku-band signals, and a 90cm/36" dish aimed at 97° W, the orbital slot for Galaxy 19.

Glorystar offers GEOSATpro DVR1100c and DSR100c / 200c model receivers, and provides automatic channel and firmware updates to them via satellite. New Christian channels are automatically added to the receiver's channel list.

Additional channels are also available for free with the Glorystar satellite system if the customer chooses to scan their receiver to add these channels. The above satellite location includes most ethnic channels from GlobeCast World TV.

== See also ==
- Sky Angel - defunct paid Christian satellite and IPTV service provider
