= Commercial broadcasting =

Practice of airing radio and television advertisements for profit

Commercial broadcasting (also called private broadcasting) is the broadcasting of television programs and radio programming by privately owned corporate media, as opposed to state sponsorship, for example. It was the United States' first model of radio (and later television) during the 1920s, in contrast with the public television model during the 1930s, 1940s, and 1950s, which prevailed worldwide, except some parts of the Americas, Luxembourg, Japan, Philippines, Hong Kong and Papua New Guinea until the 1980s.

== Features ==
=== Advertising ===
Commercial broadcasting is primarily based on the practice of airing radio advertisements and television advertisements for profit. This is in contrast to public broadcasting, which receives government subsidies and usually does not have paid advertising interrupting the show. During pledge drives, some public broadcasters will interrupt shows to ask for donations.

In the United States, non-commercial educational (NCE) television and radio exist in the form of community radio; however, premium cable services such as HBO and Showtime generally operate solely on subscriber fees and do not sell advertising. This is also the case for the portions of the two major satellite radio systems that are produced in-house (mainly music programming).

Radio broadcasting originally began without paid commercials. As time went on, however, advertisements seemed less objectionable to both the public and government regulators and became more common. While commercial broadcasting was unexpected in radio, in television it was planned due to commercial radio's success. Television began with commercial sponsorship and later transformed to paid commercial time. When problems arose over patents and corporate marketing strategies, regulatory decisions were made by the Federal Communications Commission (FCC) to control commercial broadcasting.

=== Paid programming ===
Commercial broadcasting overlaps with paid services such as cable television, radio and satellite television. Such services are generally partially or wholly paid for by local subscribers and is known as leased access. Other programming (particularly on cable television) is produced by companies operating in much the same manner as advertising-funded commercial broadcasters, and they (and often the local cable provider) sell commercial time in a similar manner.

The FCC's interest in program control began with the chain-broadcasting investigation of the late 1930s, culminating in the "Blue Book" of 1946, Public Service Responsibility For Broadcast Licensees. The Blue Book differentiated between mass-appeal sponsored programs and unsponsored "sustaining" programs offered by the radio networks. This sustained programming, according to the Blue Book, had five features serving the public interest:

- Sustaining programs balanced the broadcast schedule, supplementing the soap operas and popular-music programs receiving the highest ratings and most commercial sponsors
- They allowed for the broadcast of programs which, by their controversial or sensitive nature, were unsuitable for sponsorship
- They supplied cultural programming for smaller audiences
- They provided limited broadcast access for non-profit and civic organizations
- They made possible artistic and dramatic experimentation, shielded from the pressures of short-run rating and commercial considerations of a sponsor.

Commercial time has increased 31 seconds per hour for all prime time television shows. For example, ABC has increased from 9 minutes and 26 seconds to 11 minutes and 26 seconds.

=== Ratings ===
Programming on commercial stations is more ratings-driven— particularly during periods such as sweeps in the US and some Latin American countries.

== Global commercial broadcasting ==
=== Americas ===
Commercial broadcasting is the dominant type of broadcasting in the United States and most of Latin America. "The US commercial system resulted from a carefully crafted cooperation endeavor by national corporations and federal regulators."

The best-known commercial broadcasters in the United States today are the ABC, CBS, Fox, and NBC television networks, based in the United States. Major cable television in the United States operators include Comcast, Charter Communications and Cox Communications. Direct-broadcast satellite (DBS) services include DirecTV and Dish Network.

In an hour of broadcast time on a commercial broadcasting station, 10 to 20 minutes are typically devoted to advertising. Advertisers pay a certain amount of money to air their commercials, usually based upon program ratings or the audience measurement of a station or network. This makes commercial broadcasters more accountable to advertisers than public broadcasting, a disadvantage of commercial radio and television.

=== Europe ===
In Europe, commercial broadcasting coexists with public broadcasting (where programming is largely funded by broadcast receiver licenses, public donations or government grants).

In the UK, Sky UK is available and WorldSpace Satellite Radio was available.

=== Asia ===
The best and most known commercial broadcasters in Asia are the South Korean radio and television networks SBS, Hong Kong television networks TVB, Taiwanese television networks FTV and Philippine radio and television networks GMA Network.

== List of major commercial broadcasters ==
Contemporary hit radio in bold.

=== Africa ===
==== Angola ====
- AXN Dublado
- Dreamia
  - Canal Blast
- Palanca TV
- SuperSport
  - SuperSport Blitz
  - SuperSport Grandstand
  - SuperSport Football Plus
  - SuperSport Premier League
  - SuperSport La Liga
  - SuperSport Football
  - SuperSport Action
  - SuperSport Africa
  - SuperSport Africa 2
  - SuperSport WWE (channel WWE)
  - SuperSport Variety 1
  - SuperSport Rugby
  - SuperSport Cricket
  - SuperSport Golf
  - SuperSport Tennis
  - SuperSport Motorsport
  - SuperSport Màximo 1
  - SuperSport Màximo 2
  - SuperSport Màximo 3
  - SuperSport Màximo 360
- TV Zimbo
- TVCine
  - TVCine Power
- Zap Music
  - Zap Rock
  - Zap Blues
  - Zap Jazz
  - Zap Dance
  - Zap Easy Listening
  - Zap Hip Hop
  - Zap Trance
  - Zap Reggae
  - Zap The Chill Lounge
  - Zap 80's
  - Zap 90's
  - Zap Pop
  - Zap Greatest Hits
  - Zap Classic Music
  - Zap Afro Beat
- Z Sports
  - Z Sports 1
  - Z Sports 2
  - Z Sports LaLiga
- Zap Viva
- Zap Novelas

==== Ivory Coast ====
- Canal+ Afrique
  - Canal+ Premières
  - Canal+ Cinéma
  - Canal+ Pop
  - Canal+ Action
  - Canal+ Family
  - Canal+ Docs
  - Canal+ Kids
  - Canal+ Sport
  - Canal+ Magic
- La Nouvelle Chaîne Ivoirienne (NCI)
- Life TV
- Télévision Ivory Coast (TCI)
  - TV2
- TAM-TAM TV
- Africahit Music TV
- MTV Ivory Coast (MTV Ivorian Public Music Channel)
- TFX (Formerly NT1)

==== Nigeria ====
- 1 Music
- ACBN
- ACBN International
- ACNN TV
- Aforevo TV
  - Aforevo Music TV
  - Aforevo Francais
- Africa Health TV
- African Broadcasting Network
- Afro Hits TV
- Africa Magic
- AKBC
- Al-Ansar Radio and TV
- Arewa 24
- Arise News
- Akwa TV
- AIT (Africa Independent Television)
  - AIT International
  - AIT Lagos
  - AIT Parliamentary
- Al-Afrikiy Islamic Television
- AMC TV (Startimes Channel 117)
- Arewa24 TV
- Artmosfair
  - Artmosfair +
- ARTV Kano
- AWA TV
- BCS StarCross TV
- Be. Television

& Borno Radio Television (BRTV)

- Brekete Family TV
- Bride TV
- Capital TV
- Champions TV
- Channels TV
  - Channels 24
- Chosen TV
- CMTV
- Cool TV
- Core TV News
- CRBC
- DBN (Degue Broadcasting Network)
- DASAMAL TV NETWORK
- Degue Broadcasting Network (DBN TV)
- Deeper Christian Life Ministry Channel
- Digha TV
- DITV
- DNI
- Dog Racing
- Dove Television
- Dream God TV
- Dunamis TV
- EBS
- E-Stars TV
- Ebony Life
- Edo Broadcasting Service
- Elijah's Voice
- Emerald TV
- Emmanuel TV
- Evangel TV
- EWTN Africa
- Family Network Africa
- FAPM TV
- Farin Wata TV
- Favour TV
- Fortis TV
- Free Indeed, TV
- Fresh Oil TV
- FS Devotion Channel
  - FS Football
  - FS Junior
  - FS Movies
  - FS Sports
- G-Rhythm
- Ga Naku TV
- Galaxy TV
- GNN TV
- GWB Health TV
- Haba TV
- Harvest TV
- Heritage Global Academy TV
- Hola TV
- Hosanna Broadcast Network
- ITV Benin
- ibakatv
- Idan TV
- Irawo TV
- iROKO Play
- Isi Mbido
- IT
- ITV
- ITVS
- KAFTAN TV
- Kedu TV
- Kennis Music Channel
- Kingdom Africa TV (DSTV channel 345)
- Kingdom Life Network TV
- Kuungana Africa TV
- Koga TV
- LTV (Lagos Weekend Television)
- Liberation TV
- Liberty TV
- Livestyle Afrika
- Lighthouse TV
- LCN (LoveWorld Christian Network)
  - Loveworld Plus
- Lucky Balls TV
- Lumen Christi TV Network
- Manara TV
- Manifestation TV
- Mantle TV
- MCN Africa
  - MCN Entertainment
- Mercy TV
- Messianic World Plus
- MFM TV
- Mitv
- Moneymart TV
- Montage Sports News
- More Grace TV
- Mount Zion TV
- Mitv (Murhi International Television)
- Minaj Systems Tv Obosi
- Minaj Broadcast Network Obosi
- Murhi International Television (MITV)
- MBI (Minaj Broadcast International)
- MY TV Africa
  - MY TV Hausa
  - MY TV More
  - MY TV Series
  - MY TV Toonz
  - MY TV Yoruba
- News Central TV
- Nigezie
- NN24
- Noma TV
- Odenigbo TV
  - Odenigbo FM Obosi Anambra state
- Ogun State Television
  - Ondo State Radiovision Corporation
- Orient TV
- OnMax TV
- OnTV
- Orisun TV
- Osasogie Gospel TV
- OSBC
- Osun State Broadcasting Corporation
- Oyo State Broadcasting Corporation
- People's TV
- Power Broadcasting Network
- Plus TV Africa
- Quest TV
- R2 TV
- Rave TV
- Rahma TV
- Rivers State Television
- Rayuwa TV
- Restoration TV
- Rhema TV
- Rivers Stage TV
- ROK TV
- Royal TV
- Salvation TV
- School On Air
- SilverBird Television
- Smash TV
- Soundcity TV
- Spice TV
- StarTimes
  - Startimes Adepa
  - Startimes Afrik
  - Startimes Am'mobi
  - Startimes Swahili
  - Startimes Swahili Plus
  - Startimes Bongo
  - Startimes Chinese Homeland
  - Startimes Dahin Kowa
  - Startimes Ganza
  - Startimes Kung-Fu
  - Startimes Katong
  - Startimes Kids
  - Startimes Kids Plus
  - Startimes Toons
  - Startimes Makula
  - Startimes Movies
  - Startimes Movies Plus
  - Startimes Nollywood
  - Startimes Nollywood Plus
  - Startimes Nollywood F
  - Startimes Naija
  - Startimes Novela E
  - Startimes Novela E W
  - Startimes Novela Plus E
  - Startimes Novela F
  - Startimes Novela Plus F
  - Startimes Rembo
  - Startimes Rembo Plus
  - Startimes RnB
  - Startimes Sino Drama
  - Startimes Sports Arena
  - Startimes Sports Beta Sports
  - Startimes Sports Focus
  - Startimes Sports Life
  - Startimes Sports Premium HD
  - Startimes World Football
  - Startimes Yoruba
  - Startimes Zone
- TVC Entertainment
  - TVC News
- Trust TV
- WAP TV
- Wazobia TV

==== South Africa ====
- e.tv Media Investment
  - e.tv (South Africa)
  - eExtra
  - eMovies
  - eMovies Extra
  - eNCA
  - eReality
  - eSeries
  - eToonz
  - ePlesier
- Community Stations
  - Cape Town TV
  - 1KZN
  - GauTV
  - Mpuma Kapa TV
  - Tshwane TV
  - Soweto TV
- Africa Magic
  - Africa Magic Epic
  - Africa Magic Family
  - Africa Magic Showcase
- Channel O
- kykNET
  - kykNET & Kie
  - kykNET Nou
  - FliekNET
- M-Net (South Africa)
  - M-Net Movies 1
  - M-Net Movies 2
  - M-Net Movies 3
  - M-Net Movies 4
- Mzansi Magic
  - Mzansi Wethu
- OneZed
- SuperSport (South Africa)
  - SuperSport Blitz
  - SuperSport Grandstand
  - SuperSport PSL
  - SuperSport Premier League
  - SuperSport La Liga
  - SuperSport Football
  - SuperSport Variety 1
  - SuperSport Variety 2
  - SuperSport Variety 3
  - SuperSport Variety 4
  - SuperSport Action
  - SuperSport Rugby
  - SuperSport Cricket
  - SuperSport Golf
  - SuperSport Tennis
  - SuperSport Motorsport
  - SuperSport School
  - SuperSport WWE
  - SuperSport Màximo
  - SuperSport Select 1
  - SuperSport CSN
  - SuperSport Play
- Zambezi Magic

==== Tanzania ====
- Azam TV
  - Azam One
  - Azam Two
  - Azam TV Sports (Tanzania)
  - Azam Tv Sports 1
  - Azam TV Sports 2
  - Azam TV Sports 3
  - Azam TV Sports 4
- Al Itrah Broadcasting Network Television (IBNTV)
- Barmedas TV
- Clouds TV
  - Clouds FM
- Coastal Television Network
- East African Television (EATV)
- Ebenezer TV
- ITV (Independent Television)(Tanzania)
- Kwanza TV
- Mambo Tv Swahili
- Mahaasin TV
- Dar es Salaam Television
  - Radio Tanzania Dar es Salaam
- Star TV (Tanzania)
- Sinema Zetu
- TV E (Tanzania)
- UTV
- Wasafi TV (WCB)

=== Americas ===
==== Argentina ====
- América
- Telefe
- El Nueve
- El Trece
- Net TV
- Alpha TV

==== Bolivia ====
- ATB
- Canal 11
- Bolivisión
- Red UNO

==== Brazil ====
- Bandeirantes
  - Band
  - AgroMais
  - Arte 1
  - BandNews TV
  - BandSports
  - New Brasil
  - Sabor & Arte
  - SexPrivê
  - Terra Viva
- Globo
  - TV Globo
  - Bis
  - Canal Brasil
  - Combate
  - Futura
  - Ge TV
  - GloboNews
  - Globoplay Novelas
  - Gloob
  - Gloobinho
  - GNT
  - Megapix
  - Modo Viagem
  - Multishow
  - Off
  - Playboy TV (joint venture with Playboy do Brasil)
  - Premiere FC
    - Premiere FC 1
    - Premiere FC 2
    - Premiere FC 3
    - Premiere FC 4
    - Premiere FC 5
    - Premiere FC 6
    - Premiere FC 7
    - Premiere FC 8
    - Premiere FC 9
  - Sexy Hot (joint venture with Playboy do Brasil)
  - Sextreme (joint venture with Playboy do Brasil)
  - SporTV
    - SporTV 2
    - SporTV 3
  - Studio Universal (joint venture with NBCUniversal)
  - Telecine
    - Telecine Premium
    - Telecine Action
    - Telecine Touch
    - Telecine Pipoca
    - Telecine Cult
    - Telecine Fun
  - Universal TV (joint venture with NBCUniversal)
  - USA (joint venture with Versant)
  - Venus (joint venture with Playboy do Brasil)
- Grupo Record
  - Record
  - Record News
- RedeTV!
- Grupo Silvio Santos
  - SBT
  - SBT Kids
  - SBT News
  - +SBT Novelas
- CNT
- Grupo Jovem Pan
  - TV Jovem Pan
  - Jovem Pan News
- TNT Sports
  - TNT Sports 2
  - TNT Sports 3
- Wooho

==== Canada ====
===== English language =====
- CTV
- Citytv
- Global Television Network

===== French language =====
- TVA
- Noovo

==== Chile ====
- Canal 13
- Chilevisión
- Mega
- La Red
- TV+

==== Colombia ====
- Canal RCN
- Caracol Televisión
- Channel 1

==== Costa Rica ====
- Teletica
- Repretel

==== Ecuador ====
- Ecuavisa
- Gamavisión
- Teleamazonas
- TC Televisión
- Canal Uno

==== El Salvador ====
- Telecorporación Salvadoreña
- Canal 12
- Megavisión

==== Guatemala ====
- Canal 3

==== Honduras ====
- Televicentro

==== Mexico ====
- Televisa
- TV Azteca
- Imagen Televisión
- Grupo Multimedios
- MVS Comunicaciones
- Quiero TV

==== Panama ====
- Telemetro
- TVN

==== Paraguay ====
- Paravisión
- SNT
- Trece
- Unicanal

==== Peru ====
- América Televisión
- Global Televisión
- ATV
- Latina Televisión
- Panamericana Televisión
- La Tele

==== United States ====
===== English language =====
- ABC
- CBS
- NBC
- Fox
  - MyNetworkTV
- The CW
  - The CW Plus

===== Spanish language =====
- Estrella TV
- Telemundo
- Univision
  - UniMás

==== Uruguay ====
- Canal 4
- Canal 10
- Teledoce

==== Venezuela ====
- Venevisión
- Televen
- Globovisión
- Meridiano Televisión
- Vale TV

=== Asia ===
==== Hong Kong ====
- i-CABLE HOY Limited (有線寬頻開電視有限公司|HOY) — Hong Kong, China
  - 76_{HD} - HOY 76 (香港國際財經台) - Hong Kong/Hong Kong English
  - 77_{HD} - HOY 77 - Hong Kong/Hong Kong Cantonese
  - 78_{HD} - HOY 78 (HOY資訊台) - Hong Kong/Hong Kong Cantonese
- HK Television Entertainment Ltd (香港電視娛樂有限公司|HKTVE) — Hong Kong, China
  - 96_{HD} - ViuTVsix - Hong Kong/Hong Kong English
  - 97_{HD} - ViuTV - Hong Kong/Hong Kong Cantonese
- Television Broadcasts Limited (電視廣播有限公司 "無綫電視"|TVB) — Hong Kong, China
  - 81_{HD} - TVB Jade (無線電視翡翠台) - Hong Kong/Hong Kong Cantonese
  - 82_{HD} - TVB Plus - Hong Kong/Contemporary Teenager Youth Teen, Finance, Sport and Information Channel
  - 83_{HD} - TVB News Channel (無線新聞台) - Hong Kong/24-hour clock News Channel
  - 84_{HD} - TVB Pearl (無線電視明珠台) - Hong Kong/Hong Kong English
- Commercial Radio Hong Kong (香港商業電台)
  - Supercharged 881 (雷霆881) (88.1 - 89.5 FM)
  - **Ultimate 903 (叱咤903) (90.3 - 92.1 FM)**
  - AM864 (豁達864) (864 AM)
- Metro Broadcast Corporation (新城電台)
  - Metro Info (新城知訊台) (99.7 - 102.1 FM)
  - Metro Finance (新城財經台) (102.4 - 106.3 FM)
  - Metro Plus (新城采訊台) (1044 AM)

==== India ====
- JioStar
  - Colors TV
  - Star Plus
- Zee Entertainment Enterprises
  - Zee TV
- Sony Pictures Networks
  - Sony Entertainment Television

==== Indonesia ====
- PT Global Mediacom Tbk (MNC Media & Entertainment)
  - PT Media Nusantara Citra Tbk (MNC Media)
    - PT Rajawali Citra Televisi Indonesia (RCTI)
    - PT MNC Televisi Indonesia (MNCTV)
    - PT Global Informasi Bermutu (GTV)
    - PT MNC Digital Indonesia (RCTI+)
      - PT Suara Digital Nusantara (ROOV)
  - PT MNC Vision Networks Tbk
    - PT MNC Sky Vision Tbk (Indovision)
    - PT MNC OTT Network (Vision+)
- PT Republik Korpora Indonesia (Republikorp)
  - PT Media Nusantara Informasi (iNews Media Group)
    - PT MNC Televisi Networks (iNews)
  - PT MNC Networks (MNC Radio Networks)
    - PT Radio Trijaya Shakti (MNC Trijaya FM)
    - PT Radio Arief Rahman Hakim (Global Radio)
    - PT Radio Suara Monalisa (RDI)
    - PT Radio Sabda Sosok Sohor (V Radio)
  - PT Media Platform Indonesia (MNC Portal)
    - PT MNC Okezone Network (Okezone)
    - PT iNews Digital Indonesia (iNews.id)
    - PT Sindonews Portal Indonesia (Sindonews)
    - PT Media Nusantara Dinamis (IDXChannel.com)
    - PT MNC Multimedia Network (MNCTrijaya.com)
- PT Elang Mahkota Teknologi Tbk (Emtek)
  - PT Omni Intivision (Moji)
  - PT Surya Citra Media Tbk (SCM)
    - PT Surya Citra Televisi (SCTV)
    - PT Indosiar Visual Mandiri (Indosiar)
    - PT Mediatama Televisi (Nex Parabola)
    - PT Indonesia Entertainment Grup (IEG)
      - PT Surya Media Citaprima (Mentari TV)
    - PT Vidio Dot Com (Vidio)
    - PT KapanLagi Dot Com Networks (KapanLagi Youniverse)
      - KapanLagi.com
      - PT Liputan Enam Dot Com (Liputan6.com)
      - Merdeka.com
      - Otosia.com
      - PT Brilio Ventura Indonesia (Brilio.net)
      - Fimela.com
      - PT Bintang Dot Com (Bintang.com)
      - PT Bola Dot Com (Bola.com)
      - Bola.net
      - PT Dream Bahagia Indonesia (Dream.co.id)
      - PT Kreator Kreatif Indonesia (Famous.id)
      - ManisdanSedap.com
      - Sooperboy.com
      - Socia.id
- PT Visi Media Asia Tbk (VIVA)
  - PT Intermedia Capital Tbk (IMDA)
    - PT Cakrawala Andalas Televisi (ANTV)
    - PT Viva Televisi Olahraga Indonesia (VTV)
  - PT Lativi Media Karya (tvOne)
  - PT Vista Media Kreasi (Jagantara TV)
  - PT Viva Media Baru (VDVC)
    - VIVA.co.id
    - IntipSeleb.com
    - tvOnenews.com
    - JagoDangdut
    - Sahijab
    - 100KPJ.com
    - VLIX
    - OnePride.net
    - Oneprix.id
- PT Media Group
  - PT Media Televisi Indonesia (MetroTV)
  - PT Mitra Media Digital (Magna Channel)
  - PT Mitra Siaran Digital (BN Channel)
  - PT Radio Agustina Junior (MG Radio Network)
    - PT Radio Suara Alam Indah (SAI Radio)
  - PT Citra Media Nusa Purnama (Media Indonesia)
  - PT Masa Kini Mandiri (Lampung Post)
  - PT Citra Multimedia Indonesia (Medcom)
  - Dadali.id
  - Clicks.id
  - Suma.id
  - Apakareba.id
  - RuangJurnalistik.id
  - Gaya.id
  - Oase.id
  - Autogear.id
  - PT Inibaru Media (Inibaru.id)
  - PT Citra Multimedia Indonesia Lampung (Lampung Post)
  - MetroXtend
  - Podme.id
  - Mego.id
- PT Trans Media Corpora (Trans Media)
  - PT Televisi Transformasi Indonesia (Trans TV)
  - PT Duta Visual Nusantara Tivi Tujuh (Trans7)
  - PT Trans News Corpora (CNN Indonesia) (license from Skydance)
  - PT Trans Berita Bisnis (CNBC Indonesia) (license from Versant)
  - PT Trans Digital Media (detik Network)
    - Detik
    - CNN Indonesia (license from Skydance)
    - CNBC Indonesia (license from Versant)
    - HaiBunda
    - InsertLive
    - Beautynesia
    - Female Daily
    - Mommies Daily
    - Girls Beyond
    - CXO Media
    - Trans Media Sosial
  - PT Indonusa Telemedia (Transvision)
    - CubMu
- PT KG Media
  - PT Cipta Megaswara Televisi (Kompas TV)
  - PT Kompas Media Nusantara (Harian Kompas)
  - PT Kompas Cyber Media (Kompas.com)
  - PT Grahanusa Mediatama (Kontan)
  - Tribun Network
  - Grid Network
    - Otomotif
    - Intisari
    - National Geographic Indonesia
    - Bobo
    - m&c!
    - Elex Media Komputindo
    - Gramedia Pustaka Utama
    - Grid.id
    - BeautyDate
    - Bobo.id
    - CewekBanget.id
    - Nextren
    - SajianSedap
    - GridKids
    - Hai-Online
    - GridPop.id
    - GridGames.id
    - GridHot.id
    - GridHype.id
    - GridVideo
    - XY-Kids! Online
    - GridKids.id
    - GridStar
    - Parapuan.id
    - Foto Kita
    - GridHealth.id
    - GridGames.id
    - OtoSeken.id
    - OtoFemale.id
    - Suar.id
    - Nakita.id
    - Idea
    - Sosok.id
    - Stylo.id
    - Wiken.id
    - Kitchenesia
    - BolaSport.com
    - Bolanas.com
    - BolaStylo.com
    - Juara.net
    - SuperBall.id
    - GridOto.com
    - Otomotifnet.com
    - Otomania.com
    - Otobursa.com
    - Otomania.com
    - Otomontir
    - OtoRace.id
    - Motor Plus
    - Gridmotor.id
    - Grid Story Factory
  - PT Magentic Network Indonesia (KG Radio Network)
    - PT Radio Sonora (Sonora FM)
    - PT Radio Smart Media Utama (Smart FM)
    - **PT Radio Safari Bina Budaya (Motion Radio)**
- PT MD Entertainment Tbk
  - PT MDTV Media Technologies Tbk
    - PT MDTV Media Televisi (MDTV)
- PT Rajawali Corpora
  - PT Metropolitan Televisindo (RTV)
- PT Jawa Pos Group
  - PT Wahana Televisi Banten (Jawa Pos TV)
  - PT Jawa Pos Koran (Jawa Pos)
  - JawaPos.com
  - Prokal.co
  - Hargo.co.id
  - AntarKeMana.com
  - Komputek
  - Nyata
  - Posmo
  - Cantiq
  - Bunda
  - Koki
  - Tunas
  - Modis
  - Hikmah
  - Ototrend
  - Nurani
  - Suksesi
  - Dhara Pos
- PT NT Corp
  - PT Nusantara Media Mandiri (Nusantara TV)
  - PT Harum Terang Sehati (Harum TV)
  - PT Gold Media Mandiri (Gold TV)
  - PT Reeuters Mandiri Global (Reeuters TV)
  - PT Bhinneka Berjuang Sejahtera (Bhineka TV)
  - PT Nusantara Digital Mandiri (Sahabat.com)
  - NusantaraTV.com
  - NTVNews.id
  - Celebtale
  - Healthpedia
  - Virtupop
  - Kamutau
  - Okedeh
  - NNIN
  - Arah
  - Fesionista
  - Teknospace
  - Jurnalmu
  - Otomu
  - Neonews
- PT Digdaya Media Nusantara (Garuda TV)
- PT Bersatu Universe Digital Indonesia (B Universe)
  - PT First Media News (BTV)
  - PT Jakarta Marcapedia Media (BeritaSatu)
  - PT Koran Media Investor Indonesia (Investor Daily)
  - PT Media Investor Indonesia (Investor)
  - PT Beritasatu Media (BeritaSatu.com)
  - PT Jakarta Globe Media (JakartaGlobe.id)
  - PT Digital Media Investor Indonesia (Investor.id)
- PT Sin Po Media
  - PT Karya Media Samasta (Sin Po TV)
- PT Tempo Inti Media Tbk
  - Tempo.co
  - Cantika
  - GoOto
  - Foodizz
  - Teras.id
  - Suaraindo.id
  - Indonesiana
  - Rombak Media
  - Ziliun
  - Kok Bisa?
  - TelusuRI
  - Koran Tempo
  - Tempo
  - Tempo English
- PT MRA Media
  - PT Media Network Wahana (MNI)
    - **PT Radio Antarnusa Djaja (THE ROCKIN' LIFE)**
    - PT Radio Mustika Abadi (I-Swara)
- PT Mahaka Media (MahakaX)
  - Mahaka Radio Integra
    - **PT Radio Attahiriyah (Gen FM)**
    - PT Radio Suara Irama Indah (Jak FM)
    - PT Radio Merpati Darmawangsa (Hot FM)
    - PT Radio Ramako Jaya Raya (Most FM)
    - PT Radio Mustang Utama (Mustang FM)
    - PT Radio Kirana Insan Suara (Kis FM)
    - Noice
    - Rayya Channel
- PT Masima Radio Network
  - **PT Radio Prambors (Prambors FM)**
  - PT Radio Delta Insani (Delta FM)
- PT Elshinta Media Group
  - PT Radio Elshinta (Elshinta Radio Network)
  - Fit Radio
- PT Tiga Visi Media (MPG Media)
  - PT Radio Bahana Sanada Dunia (Smooth Radio)
  - PT Radio Dengan Anda Bahagia (Z 99.9 FM)
- Kiss Network
  - **PT Radio Kidung Indah Selaras Suara (Kiss FM Medan)**
- **OZ Radio**
  - **OZ Radio Bandung 103.1 FM**
  - **OZ Radio Jakarta 90.8 FM**
- **EBS 105.9 FM Surabaya**

==== Japan (key stations) ====
- Tokyo TV Asahi (東京テレビ朝日) (EX)
- Tokyo Fuji TV (東京フジテレビ) (CX)
- Tokyo InterFM (東京InterFM) (DW)
- **Tokyo J-Wave (東京J-WAVE) (AV)**
- Tokyo Nippon Broadcasting System (東京ニッポン放送) (LF)
- Tokyo Nippon Cultural Broadcasting (東京文化放送) (QR)
- Tokyo Nippon Television Network (東京日本テレビ放送網) (AX)
- Tokyo Broadcasting System Radio (東京TBSラジオ) (KR)
- Tokyo Broadcasting System Television (東京TBSテレビ) (RX)
- Tokyo FM (東京エフエム) (AU)
- TV Tokyo (テレビ東京) (TX)

==== Malaysia ====
- Commercial Radio Malaysia
  - **Hitz**
  - Lite
  - Mix
  - **Era**
    - **Era Sabah (Sabah only)**
    - **Era Sarawak (Sarawak only)**
  - Synchrosound Studio Sdn Bhd (Hot FM)
  - Sinar
  - Suria
  - Melody
  - **My**
  - **One FM Radio Sdn Bhd (Eight WuXian)**
  - BFM 89.9
  - Max-Airplay Sdn Bhd (Fly FM)
  - KK12FM
  - Best FM
  - THR Gegar
  - Kool 101 Radio Sdn Bhd (Kool FM)
  - Molek FM Radio Sdn Bhd (Molek FM)
  - Manis FM
  - Zayan
  - 988 FM
  - City Plus FM
  - **goXuan**
  - TEA FM
  - Raaga
  - Bapakku.FM
  - RADIOROSAK
  - Cats FM
  - IM4U FM 107.9
  - Kupi-Kupi FM
  - VOKFM
- Media Prima
  - Media Prima Television Networks
    - Sistem Televisyen Malaysia Berhad (TV3)
    - Natseven TV Sdn Bhd (NTV7)
    - Metropolitan TV Sdn Bhd (8TV)
    - Ch-9 Media Sdn Bhd (TV9)
    - Wow Shop
    - Skyten Marketing Sdn Bhd (Drama Sangat)
  - Media Prima Audio
    - Synchrosound Studio Sdn Bhd (Hot FM)
    - Max-Airplay Sdn Bhd (Fly FM)
    - **One FM Radio Sdn Bhd (Eight WuXian)**
    - Kool 101 Radio Sdn Bhd (Kool FM)
    - Molek FM Radio Sdn Bhd (Molek FM)
    - Audio+
    - SuperDeals
  - Primeworks Studios
    - Primeworks Distribution
    - Monkey Bone
    - 8unit
  - New Straits Times Press
    - New Straits Times
    - Berita Harian
    - Harian Metro
    - Hijab & Heels
    - FullAMark
    - Mind Campus
  - Big Tree
    - Kurnia Outdoor
    - UPD
    - The Right Channel
    - Gotcha
    - Big Tree Seni Jaya
- Astro Malaysia Holdings
  - Astro Malaysia (Measat Broadcast Network Systems Sdn Bhd)
    - Astro B.yond
    - Astro IPTV
    - Astro NJOI
    - Fetch TV
    - Astro Channels
      - Astro AEC
      - Astro AOD
      - Astro Arena
        - Astro Arena Bola
        - Astro Arena Bola 2
        - Astro Stadium
      - Astro Aura
      - Astro Awani
      - Astro Boo
      - Astro Ceria
      - Astro Citra
      - Astro Daebak
      - Astro FAM Time
      - Astro Hua Hee Dai
      - Astro Oasis
      - Astro Prima
      - Astro QJ
      - Astro Rania
      - Astro Ria
      - Astro Showcase
      - Astro Showtime
      - Astro Sports
        - Astro Badminton
        - Astro Football
        - Astro Golf
        - Astro Grandstand
        - Astro Premier League
        - Astro Premier League 2
        - Astro Sports Plus
        - Astro Sports UHD
        - Astro Tennis
      - Astro Thangathirai
      - Astro Tutor TV
      - Astro Vaanavil
      - Astro Vellithirai
      - Astro Vinmeen
  - Astro Shaw
  - Astro Audio
    - **Era**
      - **Era Sabah (Sabah only)**
      - **Era Sarawak (Sarawak only)**
    - **goXuan**
    - **Hitz**
    - Lite
    - Melody
    - Mix
    - **My**
    - Raaga
    - THR Gegar
    - Zayan
    - Syok
      - Syok Bayu
      - Syok Gold
      - Syok India Beat
      - Syok Jazz
      - Syok Kenyalang
      - Syok Opus
      - Syok Osai
      - Syok Classic Rock
  - Tayangan Unggul
- Star Media Group Berhad
  - The Star
  - Star Media Radio Group
    - Suria
    - 988 FM
- My Hankuk TV Sdn Bhd
  - Hankuk TV
- MYTV Broadcasting
  - Siara TV

==== Philippines ====
- ABS-CBN Corporation
  - A2Z
  - ALLTV
    - ALLTV Manila
    - ALLTV Baguio
    - ALLTV Isabela
    - ALLTV Botolan
    - ALLTV Batangas
    - ALLTV Puerto Princesa
    - ALLTV Naga
    - ALLTV Legazpi
    - ALLTV Ilo-ilo
    - ALLTV Dumaguete
    - ALLTV Cebu
    - ALLTV Cagayan De Oro
    - ALLTV Iligan
    - ALLTV Davao
    - ALLTV General Santos
    - ALLTV Zamboanga
  - DZMM TeleRadyo
  - ANC
  - ANC HD
  - Cinema One
  - Cine Mo!
  - Jeepney TV
  - Kapamilya Channel
  - Kapamilya Channel HD
  - Knowledge Channel
  - Metro Channel
  - Myx
  - PIE Channel
  - DZMM Radyo Patrol 630 Manila (Joint venture between Prime Media Holdings, Inc. through subsidiary Philippine Collective Media Corporation and ABS-CBN)
    - ZOE Broadcasting Network (Partnership deal with ABS-CBN)
      - ZOE TV Manila
      - ZOE TV Baguio
      - ZOE TV Ilo-ilo
      - ZOE TV Cebu
      - ZOE TV Cagayan de Oro
      - ZOE TV Davao
      - ZOE TV Tacloban
      - Light TV Palawan
- GMA Network Inc.
  - GMA
    - GMA Manila
    - GMA Ilocos Norte
    - GMA Ilocos Sur
    - GMA Abra
    - GMA Mt. Province
    - GMA Batanes
    - GMA Tuguegarao
    - GMA Aparri
    - GMA Isabela
    - GMA Benguet/Dagupan
    - GMA Baler
    - GMA Olongapo
    - GMA Batangas
    - GMA Rizal
    - GMA Occidental Mindoro
    - GMA Puerto Princesa, Palawan
    - GMA Coron, Palawan
    - GMA Brooke's Point, Palawan
    - GMA Romblon
    - GMA Naga
    - GMA Legazpi
    - GMA Masbate
    - GMA Catanduanes
    - GMA Sorsogon
    - GMA Daet
    - GMA Kalibo
    - GMA Roxas
    - GMA Ilo-ilo
    - GMA Murcia
    - GMA Bacolod
    - GMA Negros Occidental
    - GMA Sipalay
    - GMA Cebu
    - GMA Bohol
    - GMA Dumaguete
    - GMA Calbayog
    - GMA Borongan
    - GMA Tacloban
    - GMA Ormoc
    - GMA Zamboanga
    - GMA Dipolog
    - GMA Pagadian
    - GMA Cagayan de Oro
    - GMA Bukidnon
    - GMA Ozamiz
    - GMA Iligan
    - GMA Davao
    - GMA General Santos
    - GMA Kidapawan
    - GMA Butuan
    - GMA Surigao
    - GMA Tandag
    - GMA Cotabato
    - GMA Jolo
  - GTV
  - Heart of Asia
  - Hallypop
  - I Heart Movies
  - Pinoy Hits
  - Super Radyo
  - Barangay FM
- TV5 Network, Inc.
  - TV5
    - TV5 Manila
    - TV5 Ilocos Norte
    - TV5 Ilocos Sur
    - TV5 Tuguegarao
    - TV5 Isabela
    - TV5 Benguet/Baguio
    - TV5 Olongapo
    - TV5 Tarlac
    - TV5 Batangas
    - TV5 Marinduque
    - TV5 Occidental Mindoro
    - TV5 Oriental Mindoro
    - TV5 Puerto Princesa
    - TV5 Naga
    - TV5 Legazpi
    - TV5 Iriga
    - TV5 Sorsogon
    - TV5 Kalibo
    - TV5 Roxas
    - TV5 Ilo-ilo
    - TV5 Bacolod
    - TV5 Cebu
    - TV5 Tacloban
    - TV5 Cagayan de Oro
    - TV5 Bukidnon
    - TV5 Oroquieta
    - TV5 Iligan
    - TV5 Butuan
    - TV5 Davao
    - TV5 General Santos
    - TV5 Zamboanga
  - RPTV
  - RPTV HD
  - One Sports
  - One Sports HD
  - True FM (formerly Radyo5)
- State Media Networks
  - People's Television Network
    - PTV Manila
    - PTV Ilocos Norte
    - PTV Cordillera
    - PTV Palawan
    - PTV Naga
    - PTV Guimaras
    - PTV Dumaguete
    - PTV Cebu
    - PTV Tacloban
    - PTV Agusan del Sur
    - PTV Pagadian
    - PTV Marawi
    - PTV Davao
    - PTV Cotabato
    - PTV Sibugay
    - PTV Zamboanga
    - PTV Tawi-Tawi
  - Radio Philippines Network (20% minority shares; after 100% majority share in 2011)
    - RPN Manila
    - RPN Benguet
    - RPN Iriga
    - RPN Bacolod
    - RPN Cebu
    - RPN Zamboanga
    - RPN Davao
  - Intercontinental Broadcasting Corporation (100% majority share)
    - IBC Manila
    - IBC Ilocos Norte
    - IBC Ilo-ilo
    - IBC Cebu
    - IBC Palo
    - IBC Cagayan de Oro
    - IBC Davao
- Minor Broadcast Networks
  - Aliw 23
  - NET25
    - NET25 Manila
    - NET25 Baguio
    - NET25 Lucena
    - NET25 Naga
    - NET25 Cebu
    - NET25 Davao
  - SMNI
    - SMNI TV-43 Davao
    - SMNI TV-35 Laoag
    - SMNI TV-38 Vigan
    - SMNI TV-37 Isabela
    - SMNI TV-39 Roxas
    - SMNI TV-39 Butuan
  - SMNI News Channel
  - TV Maria
  - UNTV
      - UNTV Manila
      - UNTV Vigan
      - UNTV Laoag
      - UNTV Tuguegarao
      - UNTV Angeles
      - UNTV San Carlos
      - UNTV Cebu
- International
  - TFC
  - TFC HD
  - Myx
  - Myx America
  - GMA Pinoy TV
  - GMA Life TV
  - GMA News TV
  - Kapatid International
  - Aksyon TV
  - PBA Rush

==== Singapore ====
- Astro Malaysia Holdings
  - Astro Sensasi
  - Astro Warna
- Mediacorp
  - 5
  - 8
  - Suria
  - Vasantham
  - CNA
  - U
  - Gold 905
  - Warna 942
  - Capital 958
  - Oli 968
  - Symphony 924
  - **987**
  - **YES 933**
  - Class 95
  - **Ria 897**
  - Love 972
  - CNA938
- SPH Media Trust
  - 96.3 Hao FM
  - **UFM100.3**
  - Money FM 89.3
  - **Kiss 92**
  - One FM 91.3
- So Drama! Entertainment
  - 883Jia
  - Power 98

==== South Korea ====
- Munhwa Broadcasting Corporation (MBC)
  - MBC TV
  - MBC Drama
  - MBC Sports+
  - MBC every1
  - MBC M
  - MBC On
  - Channel M
  - MBC FM4U
  - MBC Standard FM
  - MBC C&I
  - MBC Plus
  - MBC Voice Acting Division
  - Vlending (joint venture with SBS)
- Seoul Broadcasting System (SBS)
  - SBS TV
  - SBS Plus
  - SBS Sports
  - SBS Biz
  - SBS NEX
  - SBS funE
  - SBS Golf
  - SBS Life
  - SBS Love FM
  - SBS Power FM
  - SBS V-Radio
  - Korea New Network (KNN)
  - Taegu Broadcasting Corporation (TBC)
  - Kwangju Broadcasting Corporation (KBC)
  - Taejon Broadcasting Corporation (TJB)
  - Ulsan Broadcasting Corporation (UBC)
  - Jeonju Television (JTV)
  - Cheongju Broadcasting (CJB)
  - Gangwon No.1 Broadcasting (G1)
  - Jeju Free International City Broadcasting System (JIBS)
- Joongang Tongyang Broadcasting Company (JTBC)
  - JTBC
  - JTBC2
  - JTBC Sports
  - JTBC4
  - JTBC Golf
- Dong-A Media Group
  - Channel A
  - Channel A Plus
- Maeil Broadcasting Network (MBN)
  - MBN
  - MBN Plus
  - Maeil Business TV
- Chosun Media Group
  - TV Chosun
  - TV Chosun 2
  - TV Chosun 3
- YTN
  - YTN2
  - YTN Science
  - YTN News FM
- OBS Gyeongin TV

==== Taiwan ====
- TVBS Media Inc.
  - TVBS Main Channel
  - TVBS Entertainment Channel
  - TVBS-NEWS
- Taiwan Television (臺灣電視公司 "台視"|TTV)
  - TTV Main Channel
  - TTV Finance
  - TTV Variety
  - TTV News Channel
- China Television (中國電視公司 "中視"|CTV)
  - CTV Main Channel
  - CTV News Channel
  - CTV Classic
  - CTV Bravo
- Chinese Television System (中華電視公司 "華視"|CTS)
  - CTS Main Channel
  - CTS News and Info
- Formosa Television (民間全民電視公司 "民視"|FTV)
  - FTV Main Channel
  - FTV Taiwan
  - FTV News
  - FTV One

==== Thailand ====
- Amarin Television
  - Amarin TV (34)
- Bangkok Media Broadcasting
  - PPTV HD (36)
- BEC Multimedia
  - Channel 3 HD (33)
- GMM Grammy
  - GMM Channel
    - GMM25 (25)
  - The One Enterprise
    - ONE31 (31)
  - Atime Media
    - Green Wave 106.5 FM
    - EFM 94
- MCOT Public Company Limited (state hybrid)
  - 9MCOT HD
- MONO Next
  - MONOMAX Sports (29)
- Nation Group
  - Nation TV (22)
- RS Public Company Limited (RS Vision Company Limited)
  - Channel 8 (27)
- Thairath (Triple V Broadcast Company Limited)
  - Thairath TV (32)
- TrueVisions
  - True Korean More
  - True Select
  - True4U (24)
  - True Chinese More
  - True Asian More
  - True Film HD1
  - True Film HD2
  - True Film Asia
  - True Inside
  - True Plook Panya
  - True Reality
  - True Series
  - True Spark Play
  - True Spark Jump
  - True Sport 1
  - True Sport 2
  - True Sport 3
  - True Tennis HD
  - True Sport 5
  - True Sport 6
  - True Sport 7
  - True Sport HD1
  - True Sport HD2
  - True Sport HD3
  - True Sport HD4
  - True Thai Film
  - True X-Zyte
  - True Shopping
  - True Explore Wild
  - True Explore Life
  - True Explore Sci
  - True Movie Hits
  - True Music
  - TNN16
  - TNN2
- Workpoint Entertainment
  - Workpoint TV (23)

=== Europe ===
==== Norway ====
- TV 2 Group
  - TV 2 Direkte
  - TV 2 Zebra
  - TV 2 Nyheter
  - TV 2 Sport
  - TV 2 Sport Premium
  - TV 2 Livsstil
- Viaplay Group
  - TV3 Norway
  - TV3+ Norway
  - TV6 Norway
- Skydance Nordics
  - TVNorge
  - FEM
  - REX
  - VOX

==== Denmark ====
- Viaplay Group
  - TV3 Denmark
  - TV3+
  - TV3 Puls
  - TV3 Max
  - TV3 Sport
  - See
- Skydance Nordics
  - Kanal 4
  - Kanal 5
  - 6'eren
  - Canal 9

==== Sweden ====
- TV4 AB
  - TV4
  - Sjuan
  - TV12
  - TV4 Fakta
  - TV4 Film
  - TV4 Guld
  - TV4 Hits
  - TV4 Stars
  - SF-kanalen
  - TV4 Sportkanalen
  - TV4 Fotboll
  - TV4 Hockey
  - TV4 Motor
  - TV4 Tennis
  - TV4 Sport Live
- Viaplay Group
  - TV3
  - TV6
  - TV8
  - TV10
- Skydance Nordics
  - Kanal 5
  - Kanal 9
  - Kanal 11

==== Finland ====
- MTV Oy
  - MTV3
  - MTV Sub
  - MTV Ava
  - MTV Aitio
  - MTV Viihde
  - MTV Max
  - MTV Juniori
  - MTV Urheilu 1
  - MTV Urheilu 2
  - MTV Urheilu 3
- Nelonen Media
  - Nelonen
  - Jim
  - Liv
  - Hero
- Skydance Nordics
  - TV5
  - Kutonen
  - Frii
  - TLC

==== Republic of Ireland ====
- Virgin Media Television
  - Virgin Media One (SD, HD & +1)
  - Virgin Media Two (SD & HD)
  - Virgin Media Three (SD & HD)
  - Virgin Media Four (SD & HD)
  - Virgin Media More (SD & HD)
- Bauer Media Audio Ireland
  - Newstalk
  - **Today FM**

==== United Kingdom ====
- Skydance UK
  - 5
  - 5Action
  - 5Drama
  - 5Star
  - 5USA
  - DMAX
  - Food Network
  - Really
  - Quest
  - Quest Red
  - TLC
- ITV plc
  - ITV1
  - STV – Northern and Central Scotland
  - UTV – Northern Ireland
  - ITV2
  - ITV3
  - ITV4
  - ITV Quiz
- Sky UK
  - Blaze
  - Challenge
  - Crime & Investigation
  - Sky Arts
  - Sky Atlantic
  - Sky Cinema
  - Sky Comedy
  - Sky Crime
  - Sky Documentaries
  - Sky History
  - Sky Kids
  - Sky Mix
  - Sky Nature
  - Sky News
  - Sky One
  - Sky Sci-Fi
  - Sky Sports
    - Sky Sports Box Office
    - Sky Sports F1
    - Sky Sports News
    - Sky Sports Racing
  - Sky Witness
- Global Media & Entertainment
  - **Capital**
    - **Capital UK**
    - **Capital Dance**
    - **Capital Xtra**
    - **Capital Xtra Reloaded**
    - **Capital Cymru**
    - **Capital Liverpool**
    - **Capital London**
    - **Capital Manchester and Lancashire**
    - **Capital Mid-Counties**
    - **Capital Midlands**
    - **Capital North East**
    - **Capital North West and Wales**
    - **Capital Scotland**
    - **Capital South**
    - **Capital South Wales**
    - **Capital Yorkshire**
  - Classic FM
  - Gold
  - Heart
    - Heart Dance
    - Heart UK
    - Heart 70s
    - Heart 80s
    - Heart 90s
    - Heart East
    - Heart Hertfordshire
    - Heart London
    - Heart North East
    - Heart North Wales
    - Heart North West
    - Heart Scotland
    - Heart South
    - Heart South Wales
    - Heart West
    - Heart West Midlands
    - Heart Yorkshire
  - LBC
    - LBC News
  - Radio X
  - Smooth Radio
    - Smooth Chill
    - Smooth Country
    - Smooth Extra
    - Smooth East Midlands
    - Smooth Lake District
    - Smooth London
    - Smooth North East
    - Smooth North West
    - Smooth Scotland
    - Smooth Wales
    - Smooth West Midlands
- Bauer Media Audio UK
  - Absolute Radio Network
    - Absolute Radio
    - Absolute Radio 60s
    - Absolute Radio 70s
    - Absolute Radio 80s
    - Absolute Radio 90s
    - Absolute Radio 00s
    - Absolute Radio 10s
    - Absolute Radio 20s
    - Absolute Radio Classic Rock
    - Absolute Radio Country
  - Greatest Hits Radio
  - **Hits Radio**
    - **Hits Radio UK**
    - **Hits Radio Chilled**
    - **Hits Radio Pride**
    - **Hits Radio London**
    - **Hits Radio Manchester**
  - Jazz FM
  - Kerrang! Radio
    - Kerrang! Radio Unleashed
    - Klassic Kerrang! Radio
  - Kiss Network
    - Kiss
    - Kisstory
    - Kiss Fresh
    - Kiss Bliss
    - Kiss Dance
    - Kiss Garage
  - Magic
    - Magic Classical
    - Magic Mellow
    - Magic Soul
    - Magic Workout
    - Magic at the Musicals
    - Magic 100% Christmas
  - Planet Rock
- News Broadcasting
  - Talksport
    - Talksport 2
  - Talkradio
  - Times Radio
  - Virgin Radio UK
    - Virgin Radio Anthems
    - Virgin Radio Chilled
    - Virgin Radio Groove

==== France ====
- TF1 Group
  - TF1
  - TMC
  - TFX
  - TF1 Séries Films
  - LCI
- M6 Group
  - M6
  - W9
  - 6ter
  - Gulli
  - Paris Première
  - Téva
  - M6 Music
  - TiJi
  - Canal J
- RTL Group
  - Fun Radio
  - RTL
  - RTL 2
- Canal+ S.A.
  - Canal+
  - Canal+ Cinéma(s)
  - Canal+ Sport
  - Canal+ Kids
  - Canal+ Docs
  - Canal+ Grand Écran
  - Canal+ Sport 360
  - Canal+ Foot
  - Canal+ Box Office
  - Canal+ Live
  - CNews
  - CNews Prime
  - CStar
- Lagardère News
  - Europe 1
  - Europe 2
  - RFM
- RMC BFM
  - BFM TV
  - BFM 2
  - BFM Business
  - BFM Radio
  - RMC
  - RMC Gold
  - RMC Story
  - RMC Découverte
  - RMC Life
  - RMC Sport
  - Tech & Co
- NRJ Group
  - NRJ
  - Chérie FM
  - Nostalgie
  - Rire & Chansons

==== Italy ====
- Mediaset
  - Rete 4
  - Canale 5
  - Italia 1
  - 20
  - Iris
  - 27 Twentyseven
  - La5
  - Cine34
  - Focus
  - Top Crime
  - Italia 2
  - TgCom24
  - Mediaset Extra
  - R101 TV
  - Radio 105 TV
  - Virgin Radio TV
  - Radio Monte Carlo TV
- Boing S.p.A.
  - Boing
  - K2
  - Frisbee
  - Cartoonito
- Discovery Italia
  - Nove
  - Discovery
  - Discovery Turbo
  - DMAX
  - Food Network
  - Giallo
  - HGTV
  - Real Time
- Sky Italia
  - Cielo
  - Sky Adventure
  - Sky Arte
  - Sky Atlantic
  - Sky Cinema
  - Sky Classica
  - Sky Collection
  - Sky Crime
  - Sky Documentaries
  - Sky Investigation
  - Sky Nature
  - Sky Serie
  - Sky Sport
  - Sky TG24
  - Sky Uno
  - Sky Voices
  - TV8
- Cairo Communication
  - La7
  - La7 Cinema
- De Agostini
  - Super!

==== Germany ====
- RTL Deutschland
  - RTL Television
  - VOX
  - RTL II
  - RTLup
  - Nitro
  - Super RTL
  - Toggo Plus
  - n-tv
  - VOXup
  - RTL Crime
  - RTL Living
  - RTL Passion
  - Geo Television
- ProSiebenSat.1 Media
  - Sat.1
  - ProSieben
  - kabel eins
  - sixx
  - Sat.1 Gold
  - ProSieben Maxx
  - kabel eins Doku
  - Sat.1 Emotions
  - ProSieben Fun
  - kabel eins classics
- Sky Deutschland
  - Sky Atlantic
  - Sky Cinema
  - Sky Comedy
  - Sky Crime
  - Sky Documentaries
  - Sky Krimi
  - Sky Nature
  - Sky One
  - Sky Sci-Fi
  - Sky Showcase
  - Sky Sport

==== Luxembourg ====
- RTL Group
  - RTL Télé Lëtzebuerg
  - RTL Zwee
  - RTL Radio Lëtzebuerg

==== Netherlands ====
- RTL Nederland
  - RTL 4
  - RTL 5
  - RTL 7
  - RTL 8
  - RTL Z
  - RTL Crime
  - RTL Lounge
  - RTL Telekids
- Talpa Network
  - Talpa TV
    - Net5
    - SBS6
    - Veronica
    - SBS9
  - TV 538
  - Talpa Radio
    - Radio 538
    - Radio 10
    - Sky Radio
- Viaplay Group
  - Viaplay TV
    - Viaplay TV+

==== Spain ====
- AMC Networks International Southern Europe
  - AMC
  - AMC Break
  - AMC Crime
  - Dark
  - Decasa
  - Canal Cocina
  - Odisea
  - Historia
  - Canal Hollywood
  - Selekt
  - Sol Música
  - Somos
  - Sundance TV
  - VinTV
  - XTRM
- Atresmedia
  - Antena 3
  - La Sexta
  - Neox
  - Nova
  - Mega
  - Atreseries
- Mediaset España
  - Telecinco
  - Cuatro
  - FDF
  - Divinity
  - Energy
  - Boing
  - Be Mad
- Movistar Plus+
  - Movistar Plus+ (TV channel)
  - Originales por Movistar Plus+
  - Estrenos por Movistar Plus+
  - Hits por Movistar Plus+
  - Clásicos por Movistar Plus+
  - Acción por Movistar Plus+
  - Comedia por Movistar Plus+
  - Drama por Movistar Plus+
  - Cine Español por Movistar Plus+
  - Indie por Movistar Plus+
  - LALIGA TV por Movistar Plus+
  - Liga de Campeones por Movistar Plus+
  - Vamos por Movistar Plus+
  - Ellas Vamos por Movistar Plus+
  - Deportes por Movistar Plus+
  - Golf por Movistar Plus+
  - Documentales por Movistar Plus+
  - Caza y Pesca
- NBCUniversal
  - SciFi

==== Portugal ====
- AMC Networks International Southern Europe
  - AMC
  - AMC Break
  - AMC Crime
  - História
  - Odisseia
  - VinTV
- Dreamia
  - Canal Blast
  - Canal Hollywood
  - Casa e Cozinha
  - Canal Panda
  - Panda Kids
- Impresa
  - SIC
  - SIC Notícias
  - SIC Mulher
  - SIC Radical
  - SIC K
  - SIC Caras
  - SIC Novelas
  - SIC Internacional
  - SIC Internacional África
- NBCUniversal
  - SciFi
- Media Capital
  - TVI
  - V+ TVI
  - TVI Ficção
  - TVI Reality
  - CNN Portugal
  - TVI África
  - TVI Internacional
- Medialivre
  - CMTV
  - News Now
- MEO
  - MEO Video Clube
  - MEO Destaques
- Sony Pictures Television
  - AXN Movies
  - AXN
  - AXN White
- Sport TV
  - Sport TV +
  - Sport TV 1
  - Sport TV 2
  - Sport TV 3
  - Sport TV 4
  - Sport TV 5
  - Sport TV 6
  - Sport TV 7
- TVCine
  - TVCine Top
  - TVCine Edition
  - TVCine Emotion
  - TVCine Action

==== Poland ====
- Telewizja Polsat
  - Polsat
  - Polsat 1
  - Polsat 2
  - Super Polsat
  - TV4
  - TV6
  - Polsat Comedy Central Extra
  - Polsat X
  - Polsat Rodzina
  - Polsat News
    - Polsat News 2
    - Polsat News Polityka
    - Wydarzenia 24
  - Polsat Sport
    - Polsat Sport 1
    - Polsat Sport 2
    - Polsat Sport 3
    - Polsat Sport Fight
    - Polsat Sport Premium
    - Polsat Sport Extra
  - Polsat Games
  - Eleven Sports
  - Polsat Film
    - Polsat Film 2
  - Polsat Café
  - Polsat Play
  - Nowa TV
  - Polsat Reality
  - Polsat JimJam
  - Polsat Doku
  - Fokus TV
  - Polsat Viasat Nature
  - Polsat Viasat History
  - Polsat Viasat Explore
  - Crime+Investigation Polsat
  - 4FUN TV
    - 4FUN Dance
    - 4FUN Kids
  - Polsat Music
  - Disco Polo Music
  - Eska TV
    - Eska TV Extra
    - Eska Rock TV
  - Polo TV
  - Vox Music TV
  - TV Okazje
- TVN Grupa Skydance
  - TVN
  - TVN 7
  - TVN24
    - TVN24 BiS
  - TVN Fabuła
  - TVN Meteo
  - TVN Style
  - TVN Turbo
  - iTVN
    - iTVN Extra
  - Metro
  - TTV
  - Animal Planet
  - Cartoon Network
  - Cartoonito
  - Cinemax
    - Cinemax 2
  - Comedy Central
  - Discovery Channel
  - Discovery Science
  - Discovery Historia
  - Discovery Life
  - DTX
  - Eurosport
    - Eurosport 1
    - Eurosport 2
  - Food Network
  - HBO
    - HBO 2
    - HBO 3
  - HGTV
  - Investigation Discovery
  - MTV
  - Nickelodeon
    - Nick Jr.
    - Nicktoons
    - TeenNick
  - SkyShowtime
    - SkyShowtime 1
    - SkyShowtime 2
  - TLC
  - Travel Channel
  - WarnerTV

=== Oceania ===
==== Australia ====
- Foxtel Networks
  - Arena
  - BoxSets
  - British
  - Classics
  - Comedy
  - Crime
  - Fox8
  - Foxtel Movies
    - Foxtel Movies Action
    - Foxtel Movies Comedy
    - Foxtel Movies Drama
    - Foxtel Movies Family
    - Foxtel Movies Greats
    - Foxtel Movies Hits
    - Foxtel Movies Premiere
    - Foxtel Movies Romance
    - Foxtel Movies Ultra HD
  - Foxtel One
  - Fox Sports (Australia)
    - Fox Sports News 500
    - Fox Cricket 501
    - Fox League 502
    - Fox Sports 503
    - Fox Footy 504
    - Fox Sports 505
    - Fox Sports 506
    - Fox Sports More+ 507
    - Fox Sports 508
    - Fox Sports UHD1 (591)
    - Fox Sports UHD2 (592)
    - Fox Sports UHD3 (593)
    - Fox Sports UHD4 (594)
  - LifeStyle
    - Lifestyle Food
    - Lifestyle Home
  - Main Event
  - Real
    - Real Life
    - Real History
    - Real Crime
  - Showcase
- LMN (TV channel)
- Southern Cross Media Group
  - Seven Network
    - ATN Sydney
    - HSV Melbourne
    - BTQ Brisbane
    - SAS Adelaide
    - TVW Perth
    - STQ Regional Queensland
    - CBN Southern NSW & ACT
  - 7two
  - 7mate
  - 7flix
  - 7Bravo
  - 7plus
  - Racing.com
- Nine Entertainment
  - Nine Network
    - TCN Sydney
    - GTV Melbourne
    - QTQ Brisbane
    - NWS Adelaide
    - STW Perth
  - 9Gem
  - 9Go!
  - 9Life
  - 9Rush
  - 9Now
- Skydance MENA & APAC
  - Network 10
    - TEN Sydney
    - ATV Melbourne
    - TVQ Brisbane
    - ADS Adelaide
    - NEW Perth
    - CTC Southern NSW & ACT
  - 10 Comedy
  - 10 Drama
  - Nickelodeon
  - 10 (VoD)
  - Paramount+
- Southern Cross Austereo
  - Hit Network
    - SAFM Adelaide
    - Hit91.9 Bendigo
    - Hit104.9 The Border
    - B105 FM Brisbane
    - 90.9 Sea FM Gold Coast
    - **Hit 100.9 Hobart**
    - SAFM 96.1 Limestone Coast
    - Fox FM Melbourne
    - Hit106.9 Newcastle
    - Mix 94.5 Perth
    - Hit93.1 Riverina
    - South Queensland
    - 2Day FM Sydney
    - Hit103.1 Townsville
    - Hit Western Australia
    - Buddha Hits
    - RnB Fridays
    - Dance Hits
    - Easy 80s Hits
    - Kids Hits
    - Oldskool 90s Hits
  - Triple M
    - Triple M Adelaide
    - Triple M Bendigo
    - Triple M The Border
    - Triple M Brisbane
    - Triple M Central Coast
    - Triple M Central Queensland
    - Triple M Central West
    - Triple M Darling Downs
    - Triple M Dubbo
    - Triple M Gippsland
    - Triple M Gold Coast
    - Triple M Goulburn Valley
    - Triple M Hobart
    - Triple M Mackay & The Whitsundays
    - Triple M Melbourne
    - Triple M Newcastle
    - Triple M Perth
    - Triple M Riverina
    - Triple M Riverina MIA
    - Triple M Southwest
    - Triple M Sunraysia
    - Triple M Sydney
    - Triple M Townsville
    - Triple M 90s
    - Triple M Classic Rock
    - Triple M Country
    - Triple M Hard n Heavy
    - Triple M Soft Rock
- Tapt Media
  - 2GB 873 Sydney
  - 3AW 693 Melbourne
  - 4BC 882 Brisbane
  - 6PR 882 Perth
  - 2UE 954 Sydney
  - 4BH 1116 Brisbane
  - Magic 1278 Melbourne
- Australian Radio Network
  - KIIS Network
    - **KIIS 101.1 Melbourne**
    - **KIIS 106.5 Sydney**
    - KIIS 97.3 FM Brisbane
    - KIIS 102.3 Adelaide
    - KIIS 80s
    - KIIS 90s
    - Mix 80s
    - Mix 90s
  - Gold Network
    - Gold 104.3 Melbourne
    - Gold 101.7 Sydney
    - Gold 1323 Adelaide
    - Gold 96FM Perth
    - 96FM 80s
    - 96FM 90s
    - Gold 80s
  - CADA

==== New Zealand ====
- MediaWorks New Zealand
  - George FM
  - Mai FM
  - Magic
  - More FM
  - The Breeze
  - **The Edge**
  - The Rock
  - The Sound
  - Today FM
  - Wandr
- New Zealand Media and Entertainment
  - New Zealand Herald
  - Weekend Herald
  - Herald on Sunday
  - The Northern Advocate
  - Rotorua Daily Post
  - Bay of Plenty Times
  - Hawke's Bay Today
  - Whanganui Chronicle
  - Wairarapa Times-Age
  - Hamilton News
  - Taupo & Turangi Weekender
  - Bay News
  - Whangamata Coastal News
  - Katikati Advertiser
  - Waihi Leader
  - Whakatane News
  - Central Hawke's Bay Mail
  - Havelock North Village Press
  - Horowhenua Chronicle
  - Kapiti News
  - Manawatu Guardian
  - Wairarapa Midweek
  - Coast
  - Flava
  - Hokonui
  - Mix
  - Radio Hauraki
  - The Hits
  - **ZM**
    - **ZM Whangarei**
    - **ZM Auckland**
    - **ZM Waikato**
    - **ZM Wellington**
    - **ZM Christchurch**
  - Newstalk ZB
  - Radio Sport
  - nzherald.co.nz
  - GrabOne
  - Driven
  - YUDU
- Sky
  - Sky Free
    - Three
      - ThreePlus1
    - Bravo
      - Bravo Plus 1
    - Rush
    - Eden
    - Sky Open
  - Sky Box Sets
  - Sky Arts
  - Sky Comedy
  - Sky Drama
  - Sky Factual
  - Sky Movies Premiere
  - Sky Movies Comedy
  - Sky Movies Action
  - Sky Movies Greats
  - Sky Movies Classics
  - Sky Movies Collection
  - Sky Movies Family
  - Sky Justice
  - Sky Kids
  - Sky Suspect
  - Sky Sport Select
  - Sky Sport 1
  - Sky Sport 2
  - Sky Sport 3
  - Sky Sport 4
  - Sky Sport 5
  - Sky Sport 6
  - Sky Sport 7 beIN Sports
  - Sky Sport 8
  - Sky Sport 9
  - Sky Sport Pop-Up
  - Sky Box Office
  - Sky Arena
  - Sky Digital Music

== See also ==
- Broadcast clock
- Broadcast network
- Citizen media
- Digital broadcasting
- Leonard Plugge
