= Ememobong =

- Gender: Female
- Language: Ibibio, Efik

Origin
- Meaning: Peace of the Lord
- Region of origin: Nigeria

Ememobong is an Ibibio and Efik given name from southern Nigeria. It means "Peace of the Lord / God".

Notable people with the name include:

- Ini Ememobong, Nigerian politician and commissioner
