= Kamka Kura =

- Genre: Radio Program on Livelihood and Youth issues.
- Running time: 30 minutes
- Country of origin: Nepal
- Language(s): Nepali
- Home station: 37 Local FM and Radio Nepal
- Syndicates: Radio Nepal and other 36 FM Stations
- Original release: 16 May 2007 - 1 September 2010
- Website: equalaccess.org.np

Kamka Kura (KK), a Youth and Livelihood-based Radio Program produced by Equal Access Nepal, is a radio program that is meant for the youth who are seeking better opportunities and for a good and secure future. With a tagline of Exploring Livelihoods, Kamka Kura is a distant learning job skills training radio series designed to help the youth of Nepal, especially those young people who are most disadvantaged regarding education and opportunities.

Kamka Kura disseminates information regarding livelihood issues (i.e., Agriculture, technical vocational education and skills, Livestock, Education) through the means of drama, chat, interviews, features, reports, letters etc. It also creates linkages with local services.

KK began broadcasting on May 16, 2007, and broadcast its final episode on September 1, 2010, through Radio Nepal and in the first week of September through other FM stations. It was broadcast over 36 local radio stations nationwide, both in urban and rural areas including State radio, and Radio Nepal.

From October 2009 to March 2010, with support from Internews Europe, KK produced and broadcast programs on themes of Small and Medium Enterprises (SME) and Micro-finance. The program aimed to encourage information seeking behavior among micro finance/small and medium enterprises and build awareness and capacity among micro finance institutions to simply critical business information.

From June - August 2010, Kamka Kura incorporated issues related to Skills for Employability with support from British Council. Issues like importance of vocational skills, information on some vocational and technical areas, importance of skill testing and other skills like entrepreneurship, communication skills, presentation skills, etc. were included along with the "Learning English" section which aimed to teach English for work to its listeners.

== History ==
Saathi Sanga Manka Kura (SSMK) is popular youth radio show on life skills and HIV & AIDS. Based on Knowledge, Attitude, Practice and Skills (KAPS) study and other frequent qualitative studies, UNICEF developed an innovative radio program in Nepali: “Saathi Sanga Man Ka Kura (SSMK)” or “Chatting with my best friend” or in short SSMK in 2001. It is the centerpiece of UNICEF's communication initiative for young people which is the first radio program produced by the young people and for the young people in Nepal. It is designed to be interactive with listeners as a peer who speaks their mind without moral judgment. The program's popularity has often been assessed by its listeners through feedback and letters in terms of its non-judgmental, confidential and open platform nature, where anyone can open their heart out on issues deeply related to them. SSMK has won many national and international prestigious awards on Information communication technology or ICTs including Global Junior Challenge Award, International Children Broadcasting Day Award and many more.

SSMK receives around 1400 letters and 200 e-mails every month on various issues that matters to young people of Nepal. Among most of the letters, concerns on livelihood and employment opportunities are always received in high number. Nepal has an unemployment rate of over 12.2% and its per capita income is $1362. So most of youths either migrate to foreign countries or nearby towns in search of opportunities and jobs. According to many studies and assessments, lack of opportunities and unemployment are the major problem being faced by Nepalese youth. Because of lack of opportunities, young people are compelled to migrate to urban areas or foreign countries. Government estimates that around 600 young people leave for abroad every day in search of work and opportunities. This data excludes the number of young people who leave without any documentation to India. Because of lack of opportunities, young people not only migrate for opportunities but also are facing other problems like frustration resulting various social problems. In the view of high rates of youth migrating to urban areas or to foreign countries because of lack of opportunities and unemployment in Nepal, SSMK started its spin off radio program on livelihood called Kamka Kura in May 2007.

== Facts sheet ==
- Production frequency: 1/week
- Duration: 30 min
- Radio Broadcasting: 36 radio stations and Radio Nepal.
- Audience reached: 10 million people
- Audience estimated: 2 million listeners
- Listeners club: 20+

Target groups:

- Youths who are not being able to get any opportunities, employments or training facilities.
- Mostly semi-urban and rural youths who don't have access to information on livelihood.

Content Advisory Meeting:

- Average of 5 stakeholders invited.
- 1/month

Contact Address:

- P.O.B. 118, Lalitpur, Kathmandu

== Stations broadcasting ==
S.N	Name of the stations	Time	Day
1	Radio City, 98.8 Kathmandu	6.00-6.30 AM	Wednesday
2	Bageswari FM, Nepagunj	7.00-7.30 AM	Monday
3	Radio Nepal, Kathmandu	3.30-4.00 PM	Wednesday
4	Bageswari FM, Nepagunj	7.00-7.30 AM	Monday
5	Bheri FM (NepalGunj)Sunday	6.15-6.45 PM	Sunday
6	Bulbule FM, Surkhet	7.30-8.00 AM	Tuesday
7	Butwal FM, Butwal	5.30-6.00 PM	Tuesday
8	Community Radio Solu	5.30-6.00 PM	Tuesday
9	Dhaulagiri FM, Baglung	9.30-10.00 AM	Thursday
10	ECR FM 104.2, Kathmandu	7.30-8.00	Tuesday
11	Ghoda Ghodi FM,	7.30-8.00 AM	Tuesday
12	Hetauda FM, Hetauda	7.30-8.00 AM	Tuesday
13	Himchuli FM	7.30-8.00 AM	Wednesday
