= SBS Radio (disambiguation) =

SBS Radio is an Australian radio network.

SBS Radio may also refer to:

- Seoul Broadcasting System, a South Korean radio network
  - SBS Love FM
  - SBS Power FM
- SBS Radio Network, a Philippine radio network

== See also ==
- SBS V-Radio
- SBS Broadcasting Group
- Spanish Broadcasting System
