= Transit bus =

Bus used on shorter-distance public transport services

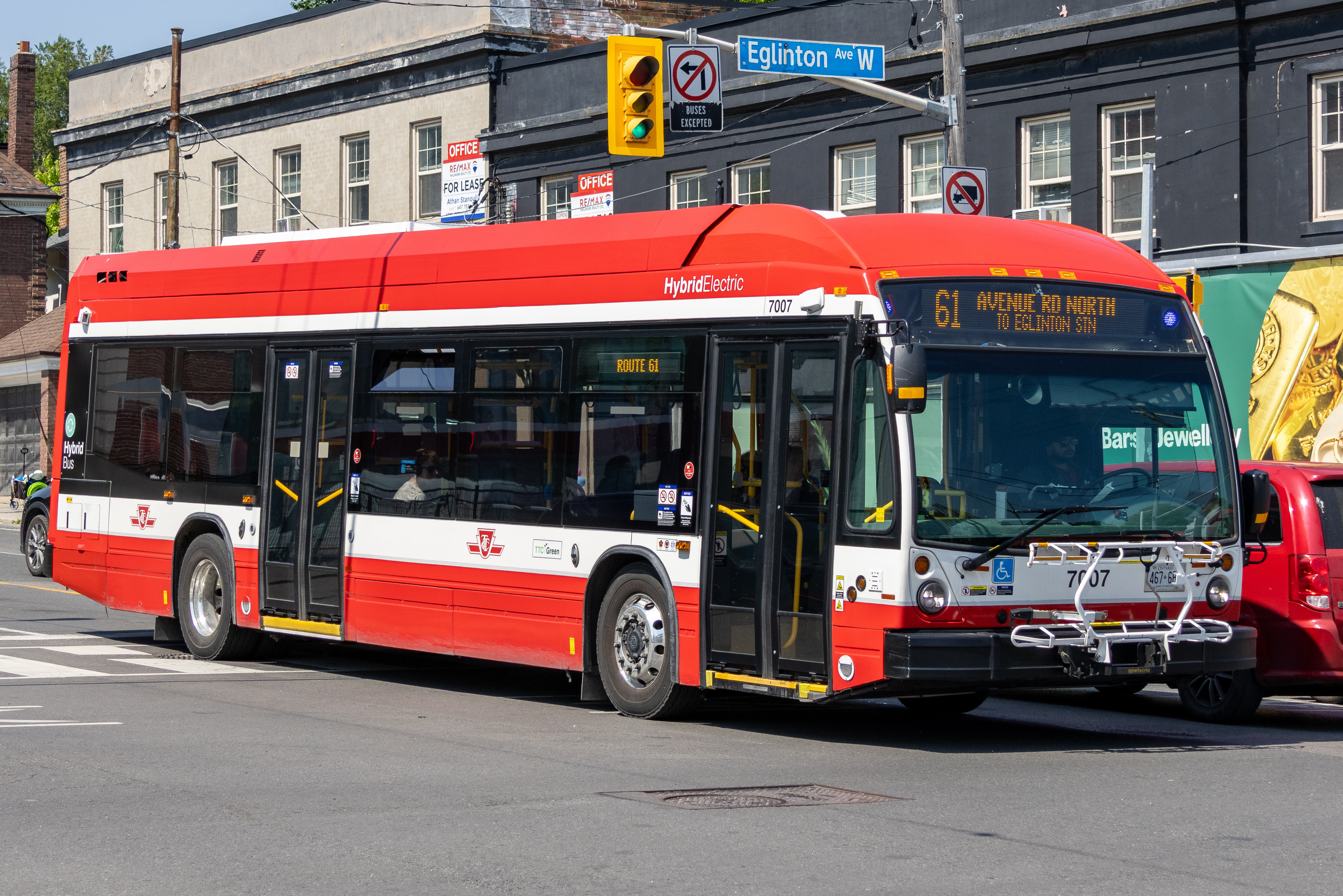
A typical North American model in Toronto: the hybrid electric Nova Bus LFS with a bicycle rack at the front.

A transit bus (also big bus, commuter bus, city bus, town bus, urban bus, stage bus, public bus, public transit bus, or simply bus) is a type of bus used in public transport bus services. Several configurations are used, including low-floor buses, high-floor buses, double-decker buses, articulated buses and midibuses.

These are distinct from all-seated coaches used for intercity travel and smaller minibuses, for more flexible services.

== Specifications ==
The US Federal Transit Administration offers some definitions of terms for a bus in public transit service.

"Bus means a rubber-tired automotive vehicle used for the provision of public transportation service by or for a recipient of FTA financial assistance." FTA also adds that automotive means that the bus does not rely on external power sources for its motion; its motor and fuel or battery are contained in the bus. It defines public transportation service as "the operation of a vehicle that provides general or special service to the public on a regular and continuing basis consistent with 49 U.S.C. Chapter 53."

Another US agency further distinguishes a transit bus from those used in intercity travel, and called motorcoaches. "A bus is a motor vehicle designed, constructed and/or used to transport passengers. A motorcoach is a bus designed with an elevated passenger deck located over a baggage compartment. A minibus is designed to transport 16 or more passengers (including the driver) and is typically built on a small truck chassis."

Generally, a transit bus will be 35 to 40 feet (11 to 12 m) long, with seats and standing room. Usually there are 30 to 45 seats, depending on length and interior configuration. If more passenger capacity is needed on a route, an articulated bus, 54 to 60 feet (16 to 18 m) long, or a double articulated bus, can hold more seats; the connecting portion(s) can bend to aid making turns.

Features of transit buses include:

- large and sometimes multiple doors for ease of boarding and exiting
- bench or bucket seats, without head-rests
- destination blinds / displays such as headsigns or rollsigns or electronic dot matrix/LED signs
- legal standing-passenger capacity
- fare taking/verification equipment
- pull cord or bus stop request button

Modern transit buses are also increasingly being equipped with passenger information systems, multimedia, WiFi, USB charging points, entertainment/advertising, and passenger comforts such as heating and air-conditioning (in the early 20th century, no bus had cooling beyond opening the windows). In the US, the Americans with Disabilities Act requires space for passengers using a wheelchair, and requires easy access of the wheelchair onto the bus. The passenger information systems inside the bus came about both because of digital technology and to meet accessibility requirements.

Some industry members and commentators promote the idea of making the interior of a transit bus as inviting as a private car, recognising the chief competitor to the transit bus in many markets.

== Operations ==
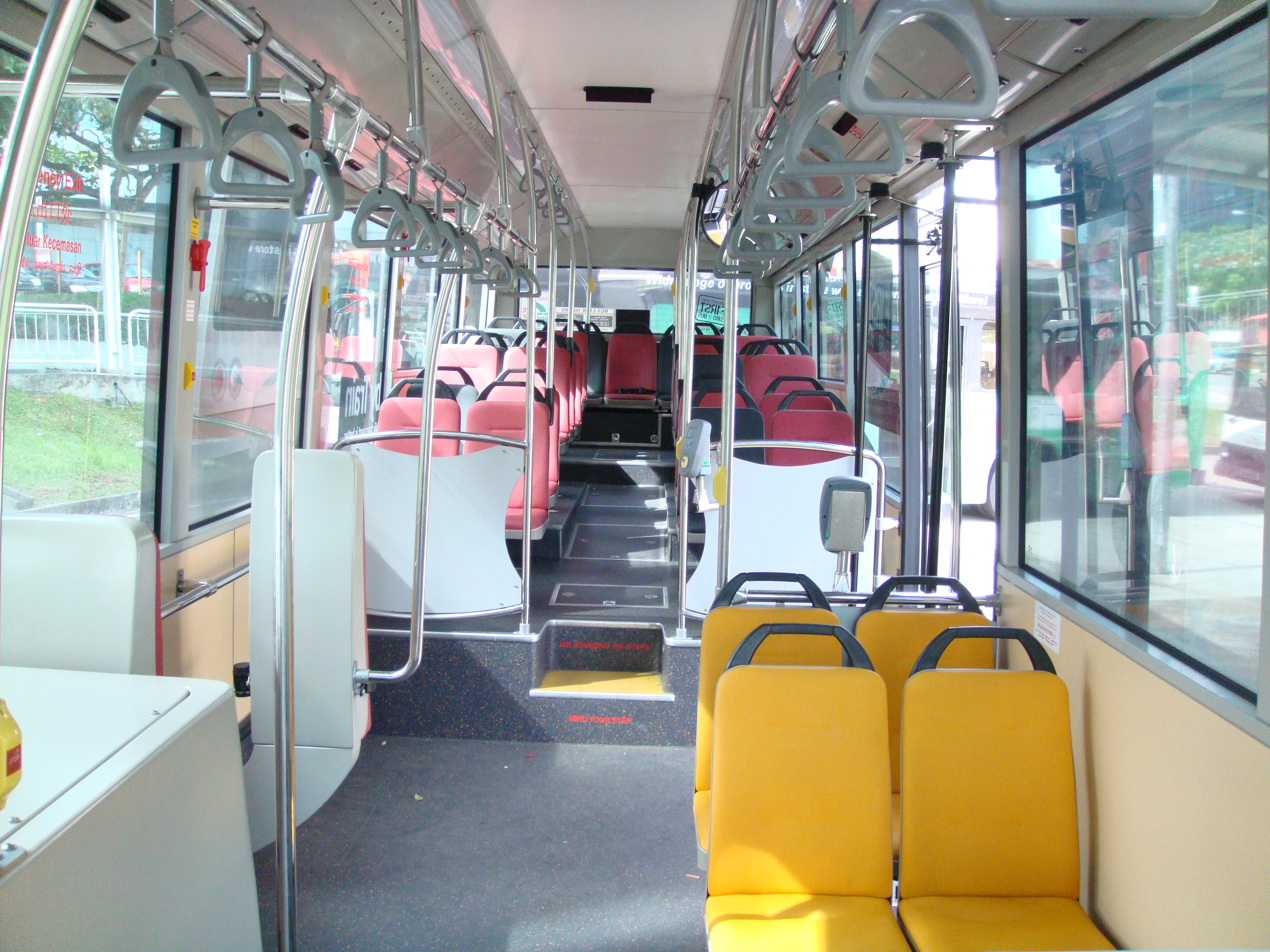
Interior of a wheelchair-accessible transit bus, with bucket seats and smart-card readers at the exit.

As they are used in a public transport role, transit buses can be operated by publicly run transit authorities or municipal bus companies, as well as private transport companies on a public contract or fully independent basis. Due to the local authority use, transit buses are often built to a third-party specification put to the manufacturer by the authority. Early examples of such specification include the Greater Manchester Leyland Atlantean, and DMS-class London Daimler Fleetline. New transit buses may be purchased each time a route/area is contracted, such as in the London Buses tendering system.

The operating area of a transit bus may also be defined as a geographic metropolitan area, with the buses used outside of this area being more varied with buses purchased with other factors in mind. Some regional-size operators for capital cost reasons may use transit buses interchangeably on short urban routes as well as longer rural routes, sometimes up to 2 or 3 hours. Often transit bus operators have a selection of 'dual-purpose' fitted buses, that is standard transit buses fitted with coach-type seating, for longer-distance routes.

Sometimes transit buses may also be used as express buses on a limited-stopping or non-stop service at peak times, but over the same distance as the regular route.

=== Fare payment ===
Fare payment is done via:

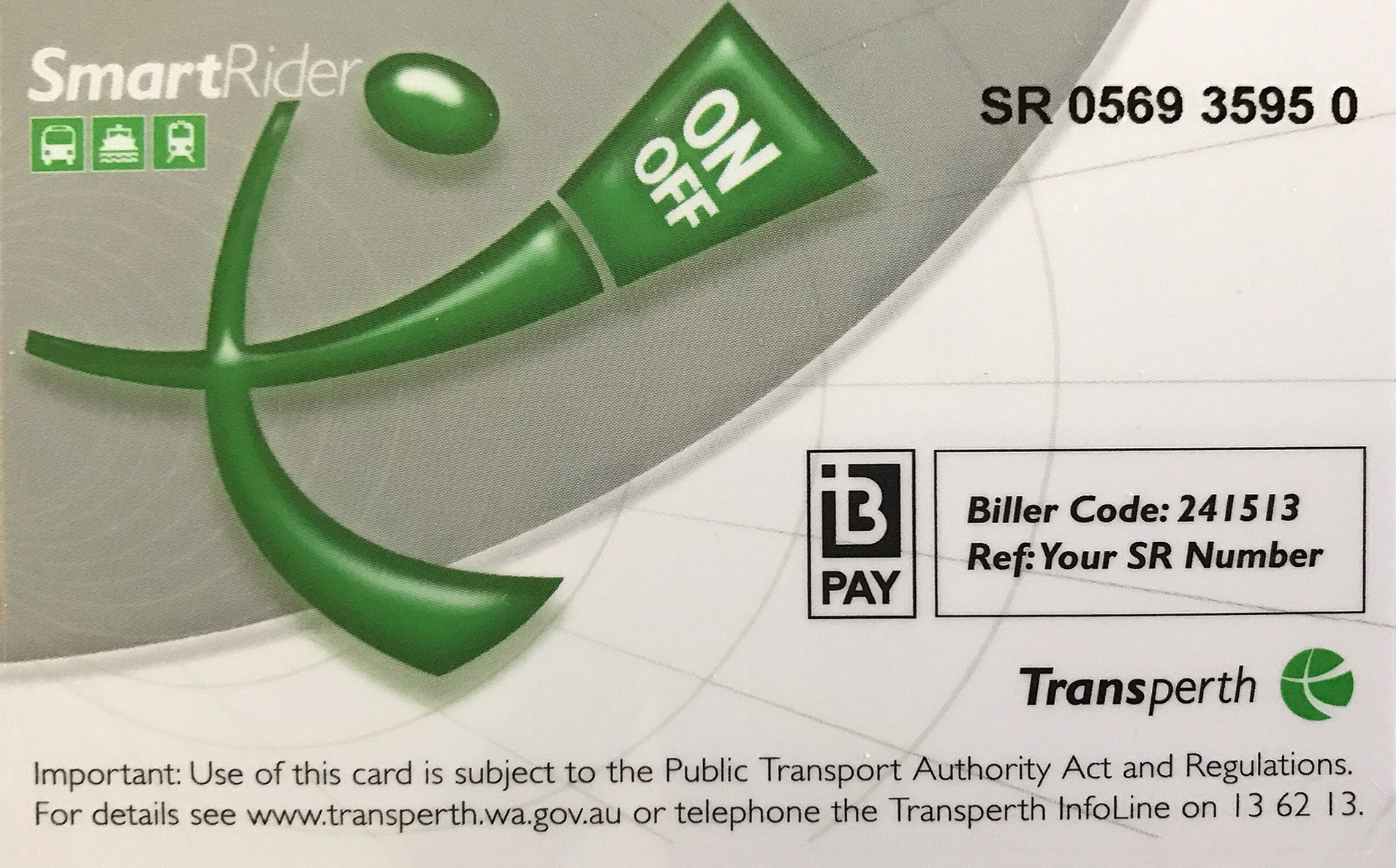
SmartRider card for Transperth

- Smart card
- single or multi-ride coupon/ticket
- Mobile wallet
- cash
- (none required: Zero-fare bus)

and is done upon:

- Pre-payment, done at ticket machines located at the bus stops or at other locations, before getting on the bus.
- boarding
- departing
- both, e.g., after crossing fare zone boundaries
- in transit, via an attendant or bus conductor (mostly obsolete systems)

=== Doors ===
Depending on payment systems in different municipalities, there are widely different rules with regard to which door, front or rear, one must use when boarding/exiting.

For rear doors, most buses have doors opened by the driver controls or patron (with touch-to-open, motion sensor or push bars). Most doors on buses use air-assist technology, the driver controlled doors, use air pressure to force them open, patron-operated doors, can push them open, however, the doors are heavy, so the touch-to-open or push bar mechanism, sends pressurized air to open the doors. Most doors will signify that they are unlocked and open with lights, this gives guide to those who are going up or down the door steps to not trip and fall.

Unlocked or open doors, will trigger a brake locking mechanism on the bus to prevent it from moving while someone could possibly be entering or exiting the bus, when the door is closed, the lock will release, this is mostly implemented on rear doors, not really on front doors, since the driver will be paying attention to the front door.

== Types ==
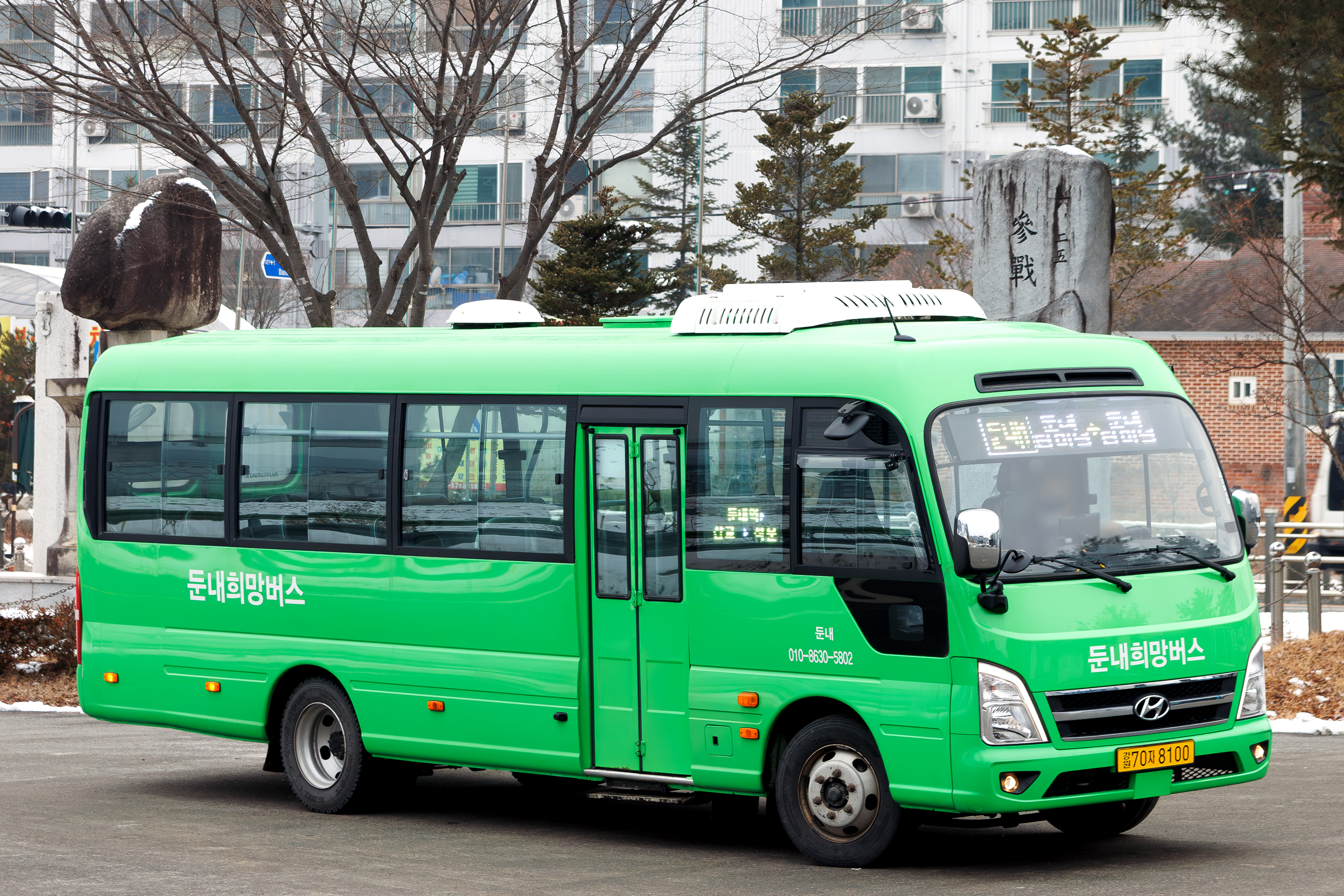
Hyundai County minibus being used as a city bus in Hoengseong, South Korea.

Transit buses can be single-decker, double-decker, rigid or articulated. Selection of type has traditionally been made on a regional as well as operational basis; however, with the advent of global manufacturing, all of these types can be seen in the same location or country. Depending on local policies, transit buses will also usually have two, three or (for articulated) four doors to facilitate rapid boarding and alighting.

In cases of low-demand routes, or to navigate small local streets, some models of minibus and small midibuses have also been used as transit type buses.

The development of the midibus has also given many operators a low-cost way of operating a transit bus service, with some midibuses such as the Plaxton SPD Super Pointer Dart resembling full size transit type vehicles.

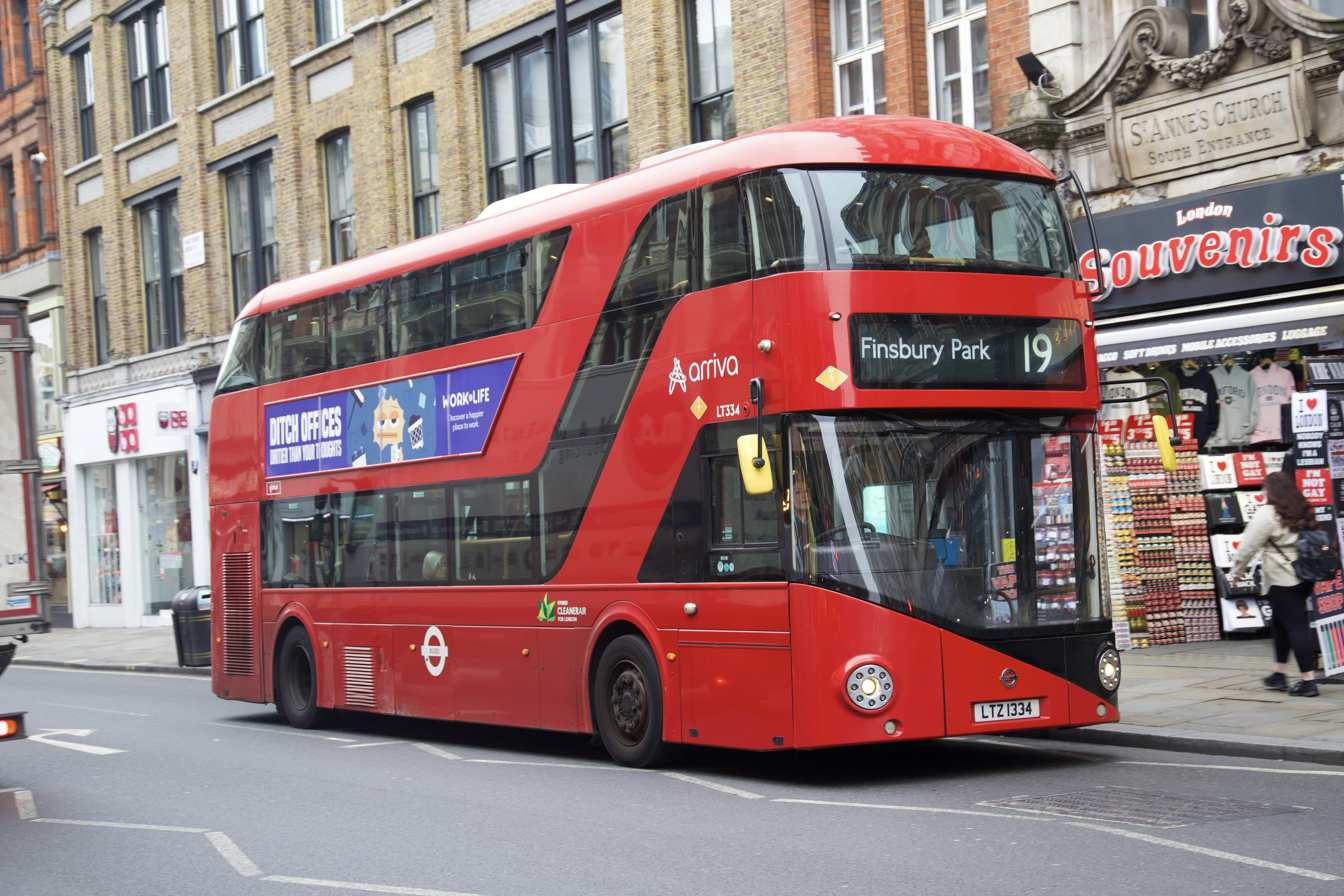
A double-decker bus has more seating capacity than a single-decker bus of equivalent length.

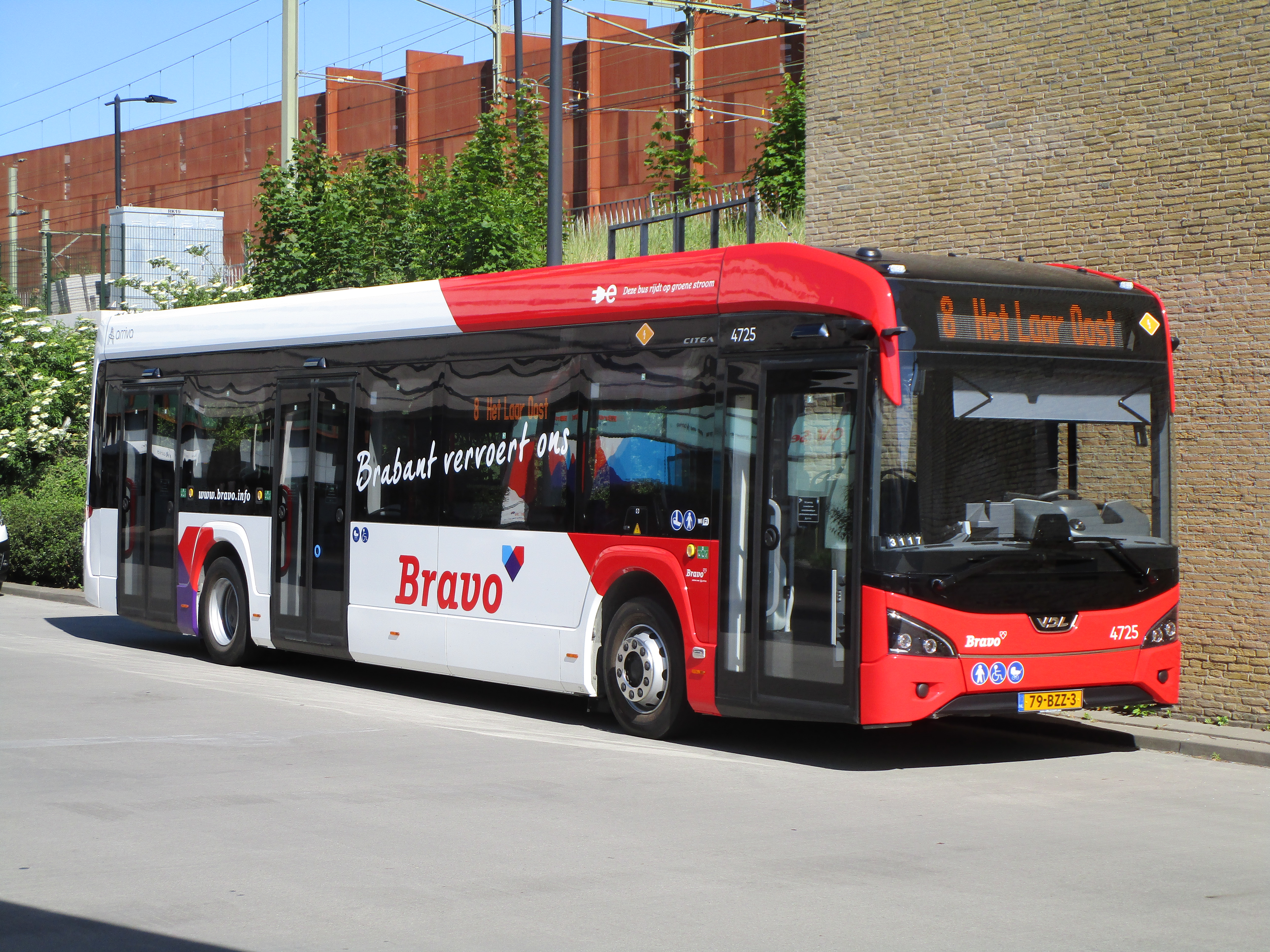
A typical transit bus in the Netherlands. The floor between the doors is low to allow for easy entry and egress.

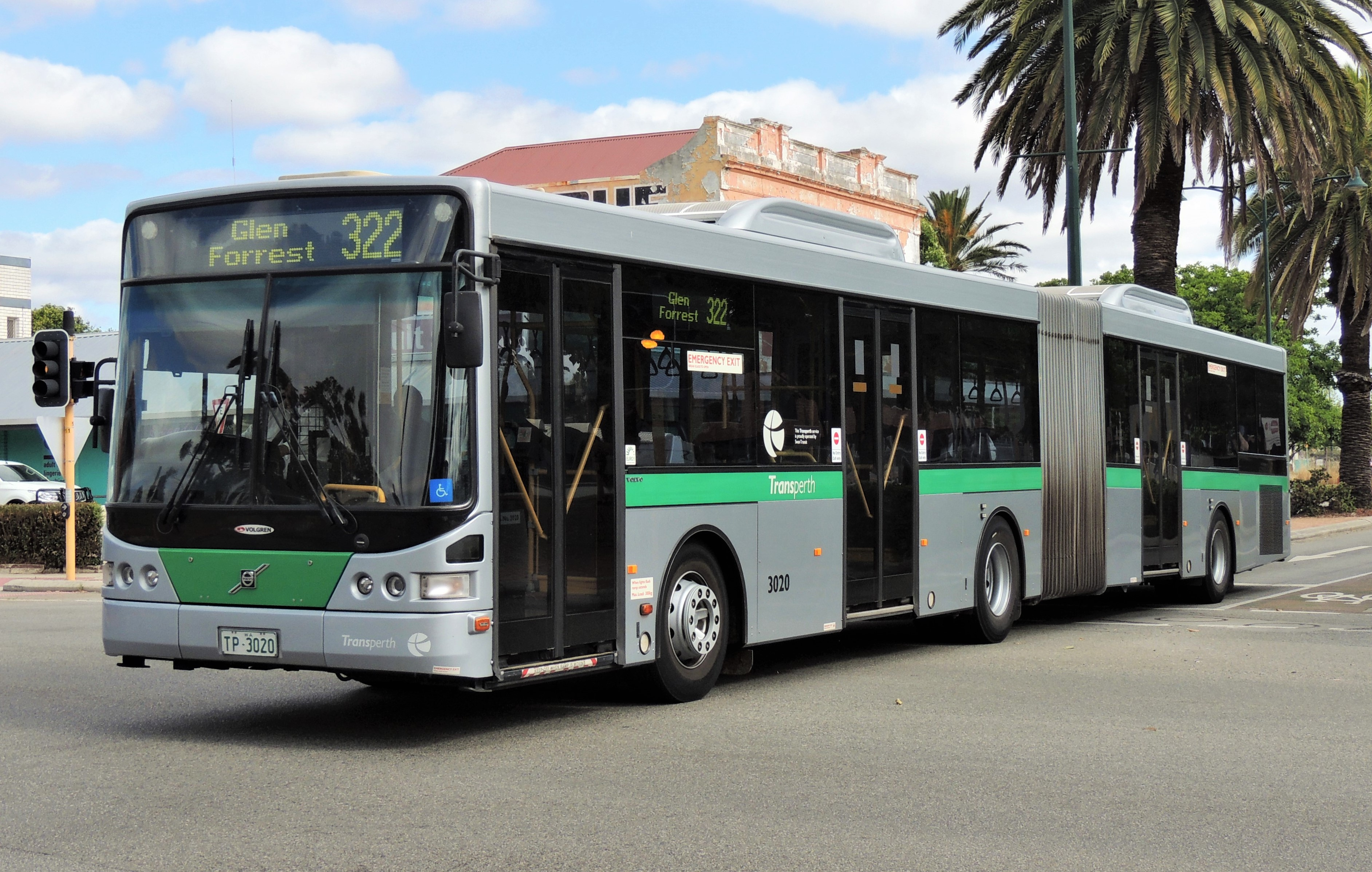
An articulated transit bus for Transperth.

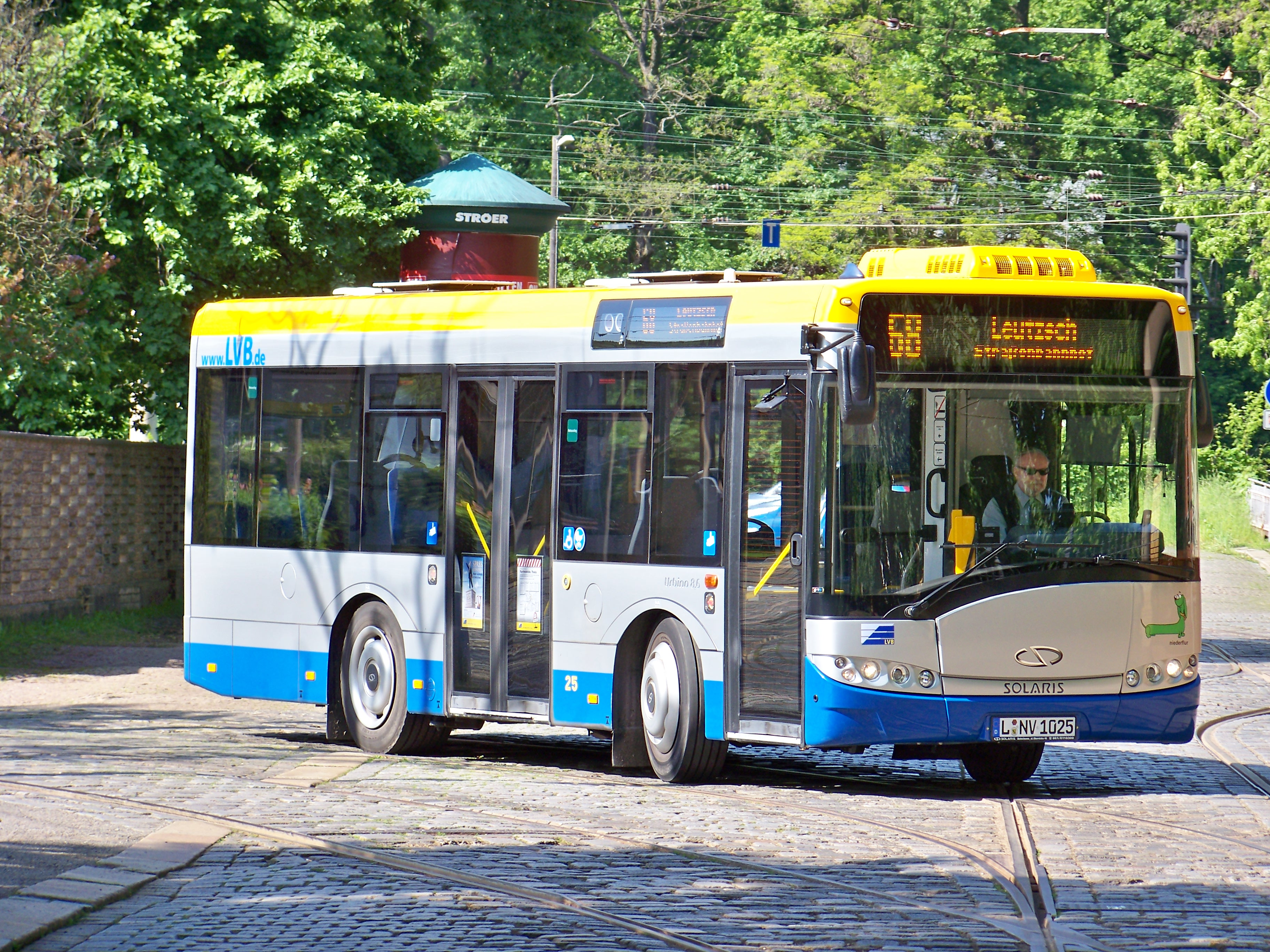
A midibus in Leipzig

== Developments ==
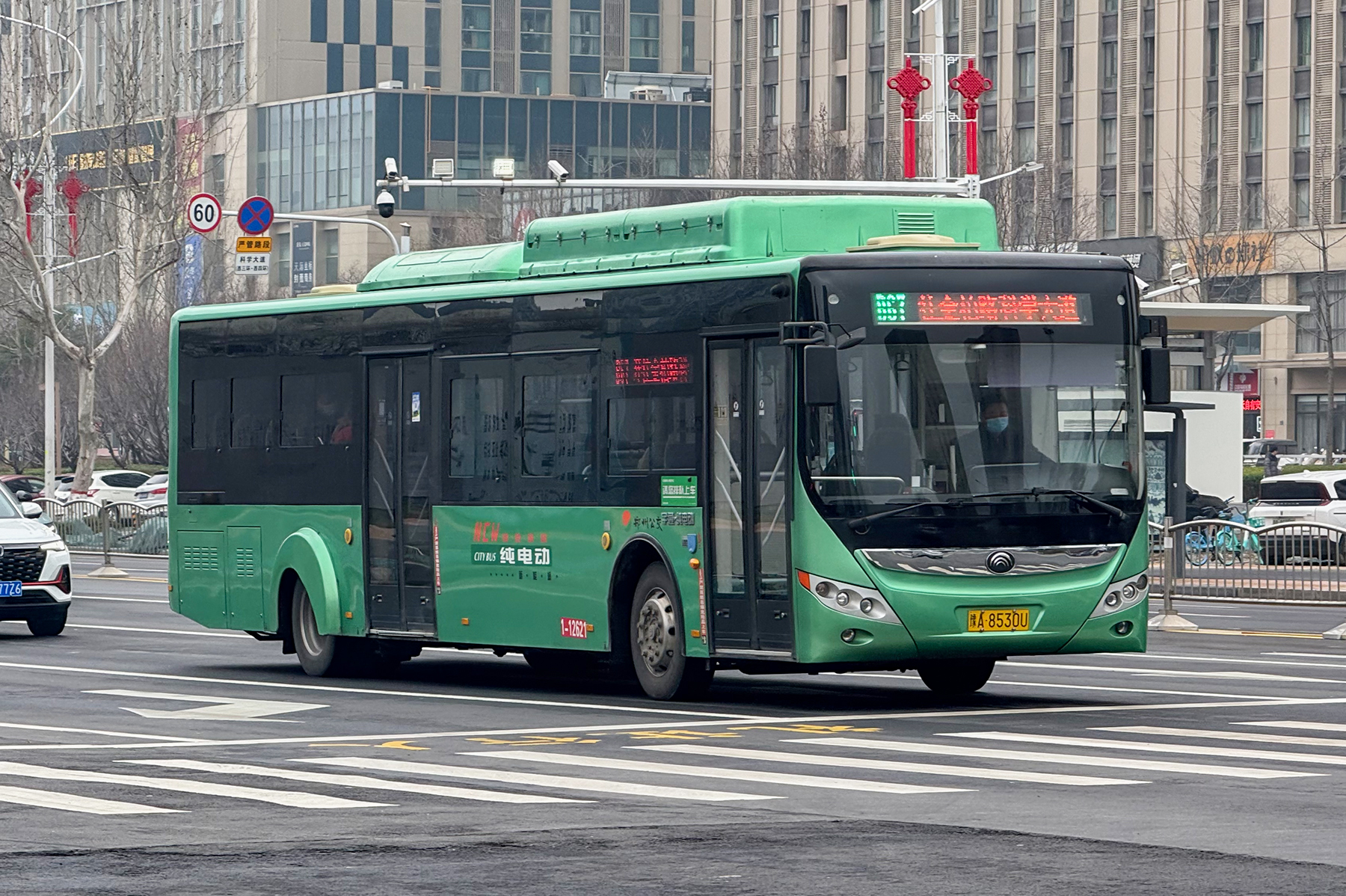
Battery electric buses are in widespread service across the world. Pictured is a Yutong E12 in Zhengzhou.

Due to their public transport role, transit buses were the first type of bus to benefit from low-floor technology, in response to a demand for equal access public service provision. Transit buses are also now subject to various disability discrimination acts in several jurisdictions which dictate various design features also applied to other vehicles in some cases.

Due to the high number of high-profile urban operations, transit buses are at the forefront of bus electrification, with hybrid electric bus, all-electric bus and fuel cell bus development and testing aimed at reducing fuel usage, shift to green electricity and decreasing environmental impact.

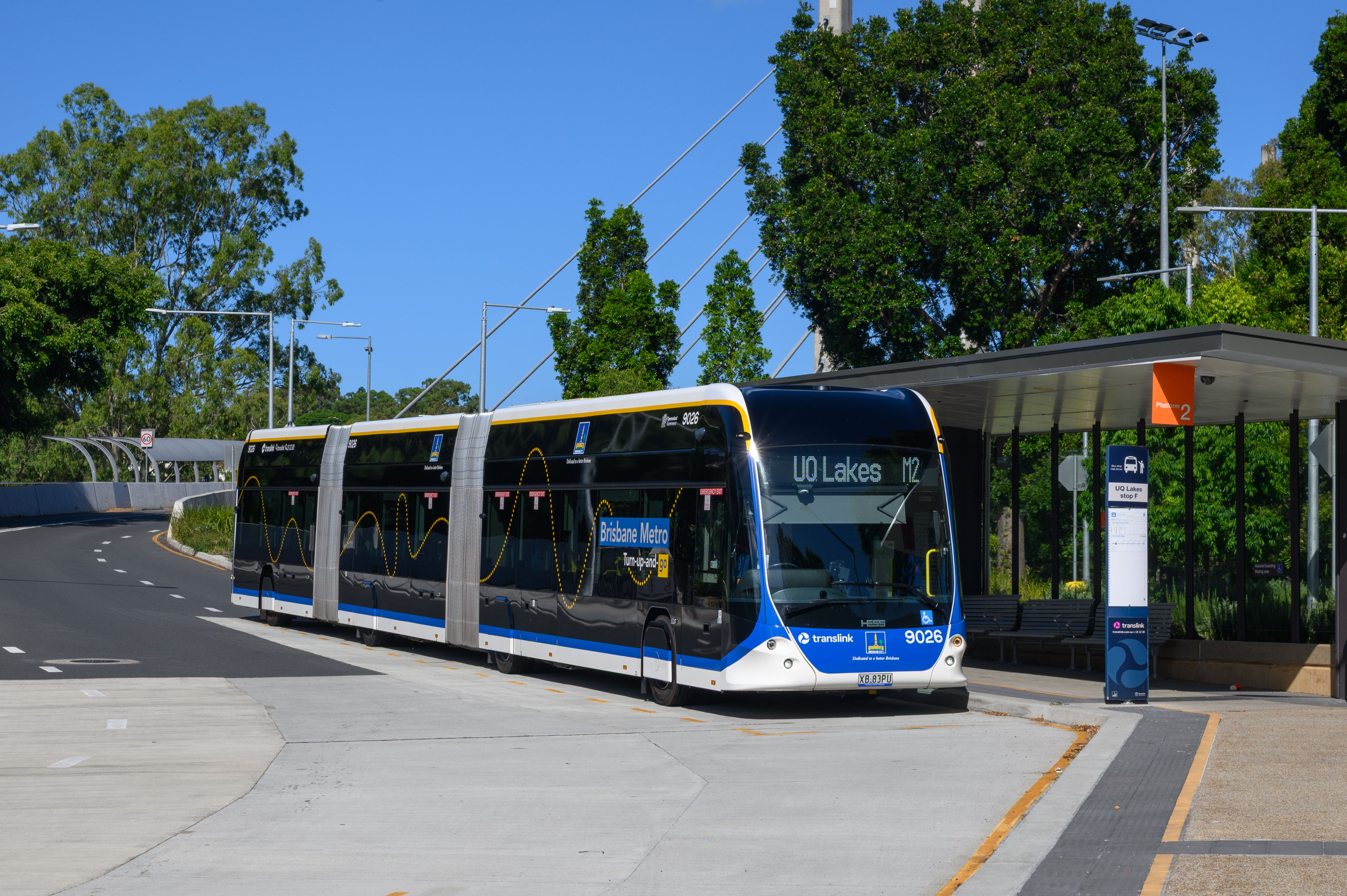
In many cities, traditional bus service is being augmented by bus rapid transit. Pictured is the Brisbane Metro

Developments of the transit bus towards higher capacity bus transport include tram-like vehicles such as guided buses, longer bi-articulated buses and tram-like buses such as the Wright StreetCar, often as part of bus rapid transit schemes. Fare collection is also seeing a shift to off-bus payment, with either the driver or an inspector verifying fare payments.

== Commuter bus service ==
A commuter or express bus service is a fixed-route bus characterized by service predominantly in one direction during peak periods, limited stops, use of multi-ride tickets and routes of extended length, usually between the central business district and outlying suburbs. Commuter bus service also may include other service, characterized by a limited route structure, limited stops and a coordinated relationship with another mode of transportation. They may closely follow the routing of a conventional bus route but not stopping at every stop or not making detours such as into residential or commercial areas that conventional routes may take.

== See also ==
- Electric bus
- Highway bus
- Intercity bus service
- List of buses (list of types of transit buses)
- Trolleybus
- Public transport
