= Naya Nepal =

- Genre: Radio program on peace building, democracy, good governance and human rights
- Running time: 30 minutes
- Country of origin: Nepal
- Language(s): Nepali
- Home station: 37 Local FM and Radio Nepal
- Syndicates: Radio Nepal and other 36 FM Stations
- Original release: 31 May 2006
- Website: Equal Access Homepage

Naya Nepal is a half-hour-long interactive radio program produced by Equal Access Nepal. It first aired May 31, 2006. At first the program concentrated on the impact of the Nepalese Civil War and discussed the root cause of the conflict and the changing political context of Nepal. The program airs once a week through Radio Nepal, the Word Space satellite channel and more than 45 FM stations across the country. The main themes of the programme include peace building and conflict transformation, good governance, human rights, rule of law, the political reform process, Constituent Assembly elections and the constitution building process The main target groups are youth and adult populations of rural areas.

== History ==
In October 2005, Equal Access began implementation of “Sundar Shanta Bishal” (SSB), (Beautiful Peaceful Diverse Land), with the predominant aim of using radio to raise awareness across Nepal of the rising human cost of the conflict, through a combination of real ‘voices from the field’ and dramatized accounts of Nepali and international nonviolent movements conveyed via a dynamic serial drama. Initial program design and implementation took place against a backdrop of strict media censorship. In response to the media clampdown following the King's ascension in February 2005, which led to a ban on news broadcasts, the SSB initiative was created to provide rural Nepalis, who were impacted by the ongoing conflict, with a variety of peaceful methods to express themselves.

The significant changes that occurred in Nepal during 2006 and the subsequent years, along with the evolving nature of the conflict, enabled the program to explore numerous topics previously off-limits, including democracy and corruption, for both rural and urban Nepalis. As Nepal progressed through its peace process, SSB adapted to better address the evolving realities, fostering a sense of hope for a more promising future. Reflecting this optimism and desire for peace, SSB was renamed “Naya Nepal” or “New Nepal,” symbolizing the nation's aspiration for a brighter tomorrow.

From February 2007 Naya Nepal produced two episodes a week: one focused on women and their issues to be raised in the Constituent Assembly, and one focused on peace-building and governance. It disseminated critically needed information and educational material on how the youth and adult population of Nepal could contribute to peace and reconciliation in the transition period.

Since March 2009, only one episode of Naya Nepal is produced and broadcast a week.

== Community Activities ==
A group of ten community reporters and twelve local FM station producers received training from Naya Nepal, focusing on creating local adaptations of Naya Nepal and channeling community perspectives to Equal Access's central production unit. The initiative resulted in the production of Naya Nepal in various languages across different stations: seven stations in Nepali, three in Maithili, one in Bhojpuri, one broadcasting in both Doteli and Tharu languages, and another in the Tamang language.

Naya Nepal has worked with community organizations including SOLVE Nepal, General Welfare Pratisthan (GWP) and Samjhauta Nepal to mobilize community reporters and to facilitate a listeners’ club, from which feedback is incorporated into the program.

== Present ==
At present, Naya Nepal covers issues which are directly related to minorities of Nepal including Dalits, women, and other disadvantaged groups with special reference to how these issues will be incorporated in Nepal’s new constitution. The program facilitated direct interaction between community and Constituent Assembly members in a direct phone-in program.

Donor agencies such as USAID, UNDEF, UNIFEM, the Institute of Peace & Justice (IPJ), International Alert (IA), the International Center for Transitional Justice (ICTJ), and CEDPA have provided financial and technical support to produce and disseminate Naya Nepal.
