= Iniobong =

Nigerian unisex given name of Ibibio origin

- Gender: Unisex
- Language: Ibibio

Origin
- Language: Ibibio
- Origin: Nigeria
- Meaning: God's time
- Region of origin: South-south Nigeria

Other names
- Variant form: Iniabasi

Iniobong (audio) is a Nigerian unisex given name of Ibibio origin meaning "God's time".

The name is used among Ibibio speakers in southern Nigeria. Ini is a shortened form of the name, meaning “time”.

== Variant forms ==
- Iniabasi

== Notable people with the name ==
- Ini Dima-Okojie (born 1990), Nigerian actress
- Ini Edo (born 1982), Nigerian actress
- Ini Ememobong (born 1988), Nigerian politician
- Ini-Abasi Umotong (born 1994), Nigerian professional footballer
