= Degue Broadcasting Network =

Nigerian company

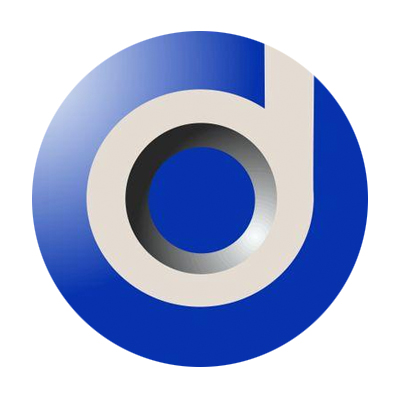
- Type: Private company
- Country: Nigeria
- Founded: 1986
- Owner: Osa Adun Sonny
- Digital channel: 32 (UHF)
- Official website: http://www.dbntvafrica.com

Degue Broadcasting Network (DBN) a.k.a. DBN Television was incorporated in Nigeria in 1986 by Mr. Osa Sonny Adun and started its broadcasting in 1995 a year before the Nigerian Government deregulated the broadcast media.

== History ==
DBN started broadcasting in 1995 as a private station by seasoned media practitioner Mr Osa Sonny Adun. It commenced operations in Lagos and later grew to have operations in Abuja.

The channel was allocated frequency on UHF (Channel 32). It also is a member of Commonwealth Broadcasting Association (CBA), Africa Union of Broadcasters (AUB) and the Broadcasting Organization of Nigeria (BON). DBN also transmits on Satellite TV Startimes on channel 124.
