= True Spark =

True Spark ทรูสปาร์ก
- Country: Thailand
- Broadcast area: Thailand

Programming
- Picture format: 576i (4:3 SDTV)

Ownership
- Owner: TrueVisions

History
- Launched: 17 April 1989 (37 years ago); UBC: July 1, 1998; True: January 23, 2007
- Replaced: Toon (True Spark Jump)
- Former names: IBC 7, IBC Cartoons, IBC Kids (1989–1998); UBC Movies and Kids (1998–1999); UBC Kids (1999–2003); UBC Spark (2003–2007)

Links
- Website: http://www.truevisionstv.com/

True Spark (Thai: ทรูสปาร์ก) is a 24-hour television channel for children provided by TrueVisions. It broadcast cartoons that come from Japan, United States and Europe. It broadcasts on channel 444 (digital) and channel 28 (analogue).

== History ==
True Spark has been broadcast since TrueVisions was IBC. In that time, it was named IBC Cartoons (Thai: ไอบีซี การ์ตูน). It was broadcast on IBC Channel 7. After a few years, IBC Cartoons was renamed IBC Kids (Thai: ไอบีซี คิดส์). It was used to broadcast for 24 hours and presents new episodes of cartoons between 6:00pm to 8:30pm. After a few years, its broadcast duration was reduced to 5:00am to 8:00pm and presents new episodes of cartoons between 6:00pm to 8:00pm. Then, in July 1998, IBC combined its business with UTV, then renamed IBC to UBC, integrating cartoons and movies into one channel, under the banner of UBC Movies & Kids - broadcast on channel 25 (Thai: ยูบีซี มูฟวีส์ แอนด์ คิดส์). The channel shows children's programmes between 6:00am to 8:00pm and shows movies and drama series from 8:00pm to 6:00am.

In March 1999, UBC separated all its movies into its own movie channel, UBC Movies, and at this time, the channel was renamed UBC Kids (Thai: ยูบีซี คิดส์). It was broadcast on channel 26 between 6:00am to 8:00pm.

On 1 July 2003, it was renamed to UBC Spark (Thai: ยูบีซี สปาร์ก), and in 2004, UBC Spark moved to channel 28, and by June 1, 2005, the channel sees its broadcasting hours extended to 9:00pm

On 1 April 2006, UBC was renamed to UBC-True and following the move, UBC Spark began broadcasting 24-hours. On 23 January 2007, UBC-True was renamed to TrueVisions, was renamed True Spark, and presents new episodes of cartoons between 4:00pm to 8:00pm.

On 15 May 2016, True Spark was split into two channels True Spark Play and True Spark Jump.

On 1 October 2023, True Spark Jump had ceased broadcasting. All cartoons from True Spark Jump had been moved to True Spark Play.
