= Ini Ememobong =

Nigerian politician (born 1983)

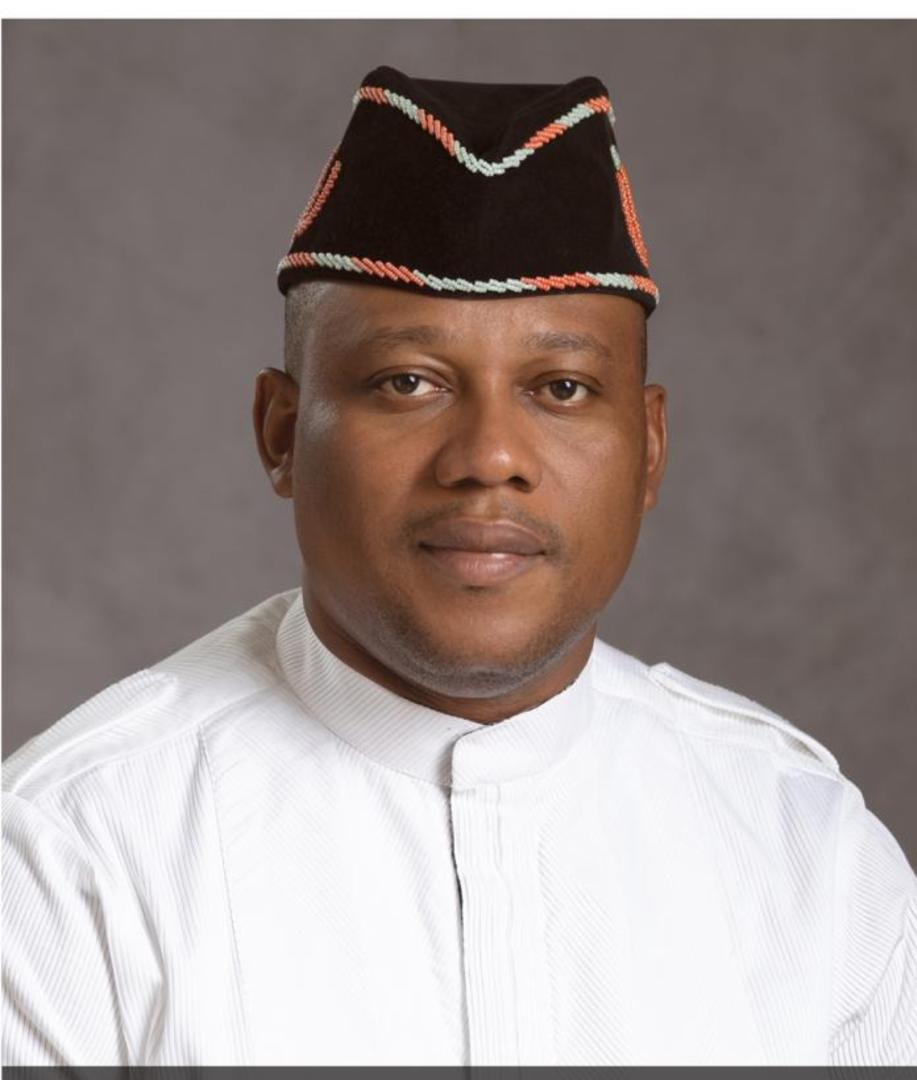

National Publicity Secretary, PDP.

Personal details
- Born: 7 November 1983 (age 42) Akwa Ibom State, Nigeria
- Citizenship: Nigeria
- Spouse(s): Chinonyerem (Chy) Sandra-Emejuiwe Ini Ememobong, 2011
- Occupation: Politician
- Profession: Lawyer, public relations

Ini Ememobong is a lawyer, linguist, public relations specialist, political strategist, conflict analyst, chartered mediator and conciliator, a community development enthusiast, and author. He is the current National Publicity Secretary of the Peoples Democratic Party. He is the immediate past commissioner of the Ministry of Special Duties and Ibom Deep Seaport. He also served as the Commissioner in the Ministry of Information, Strategy, and Special Duties in Akwa Ibom State and the former state publicity secretary of Peoples Democratic Party in Akwa Ibom State of Nigeria. He is the founder of Ini Ememobong Foundation.

== Birth and personal life ==
He was born on 7 November 1983. He is the second son in the family of Mkpisong Ememobong and Rosemary Essien.

He is a member of the Church of Christ and is married to Chinonyerem Ini Ememobong, with whom he has three children

== Education ==
He started his education at Calabar Preparatory Nursery School. In 1987, at the creation of Akwa Ibom State, his family relocated to Ikot Ekpene, where he continued his primary education at Holy Child International Nursery and Primary School, Ikot Ekpene.

He demonstrated an unusual intelligence from a very tender age and was severally favoured as the school's representative in many external events, including participation in the then famous Young Brains TV programme of the Akwa Ibom State Broadcasting Corporation (AKBC).

He later moved to St. Mary's Science College, Abak, where he emerged as the editor-in-chief of the school's press club. He was also a compere at many events on campus.

In 2000, he was offered admission to study linguistics and Nigerian languages and in 2005, he obtained the Bachelor of Arts degree in linguistics. It was in his time that the department witnessed a renaissance, particularly in student's politics and socials. His effective and fervent interventions and advocacy remain indelible in the minds of his colleagues. It is acknowledged that he motivated other students in the department to contest elections within and outside the department.

Upon graduation, he was mobilized for the National Youth Service Scheme and posted to Taraba. At camp, he served with OBS (the media house of the camp). He was subsequently posted to Darul Arkam Koranic School, where he taught English language. He became the first chairman of the editorial board CDS group in Taraba. Using that office, he published the first newsletter by NYSC Taraba. He published this newsletter by taking a loan from the NYSC, using his allowance as the collateral. He started an inspirational talk show on the radio Taraba and in less than three months the show became quite popular. While in Taraba, he was hosted by top dignitaries like the deputy governor, and the emir of Muri, among others, in recognition of his excellent services to their state.

In 2007, he gained admission to study law at the University of Uyo. In 2012, he completed his LL.B. programme and in 2013, he proceeded to the Nigerian Law School, Enugu Campus, and was called to the Nigerian Bar as barrister and solicitor of the Supreme Court of Nigeria in 2014.

In 2016, he enrolled to study for a master's degree in peace and conflict studies, and very recently completed the course, thus acquiring an M.A. in peace and conflict studies.

In 2025, he obtained a master's degree in leadership and development, with distinction, from King's College London.

== Significant certificates ==
Ememobong holds:

A Certificate in Negotiation from Harvard University, Boston, Massachusetts, United States of America

A Certificate in Environmental and Sustainable Development from the Moscow State Institute of International Relations, Russia.

A certificate in Governmental Leadership: Politics, Communication and Influence from the Georgia state university, Atlanta, Georgia, USA.

== Work ==
In 2020, Ini was appointed as the Commissioner for Information & Strategy in Akwa Ibom State. He has held several positions in development and government circles.

He served as a member of National Working Group NEPAD/APRM, 2007–2009.

President, National Association of Nigerian Students, 2009–2011, technical assistant, MDGS – presidency (2011–2013).

Special assistant to the governor of Akwa Ibom State on student matters (2013–2015) and subsequently special assistant to the governor on political matters (2015–2016).

He served as the publicity secretary of the People's Democratic Party (Nigeria), Akwa Ibom State (2016–2020).

He also served as the honourable Commissioner for Information and Strategy in Akwa Ibom State and later as honourable Commissioner for Special Duties and Ibom Deep Seaport until 6 June 2025, when he resigned following Governor Umo Eno’s defection from the People's Democratic Party (Nigeria) to the All Progressives Congress (Nigeria)

He is a public relations executive, a fellow of the Institute of Chartered Mediator and Conciliators, and a member of several other professional bodies, including Nigerian Bar Association, Nigerian Institute of Public Relations, etc.

He is a philanthropist and humanitarian and serves as the president, Rotary Club of Uyo Metropolis under District 1942.

== Awards and recognition ==
Rotary Club of Uyo Metropolis District 9142 Nigeria. 2019 Humanitarian Service Award

Nigerian Union of Journalists, Akwa Ibom State Council. 2018 Excellent Community Service Award

Ibiono Ibom traditional rulers council. 2018 Eti Uwod Mkpo (Standard Bearer) Ibiono Ibom.

Nigerian Institute of Public Relations, Akwa Ibom State Branch. Man of the Year 2019
