= Channel M (radio station) =

South Korean digital radio station

- South Korea
- Frequency: DAB (12A)

Ownership
- Owner: MBC

Links
- Website: Channel M (MBC)

Channel M is a DAB+ radio station for the Munhwa Broadcasting Corporation and is also South Korea's first DAB+ station.
