= True Sports =

Thai suite of TV channels

- Country: Thailand
- Broadcast area: Asia
- Network: TrueVisions
- Headquarters: 118/1 Tipco Tower Rama 6 Rd. Samsennai, Phaya Thai, Bangkok, Thailand 10400

Programming
- Language: Thai
- Picture format: True Sports 5, and 7 576i (4:3 SDTV); True Sports 1, 2, 3, 4 and True Tennis 1080i (16:9 HDTV)

Ownership
- Owner: TrueVisions

History
- Launched: 1 August 2007; 19 years ago
- Replaced: SuperSport; UBC SuperSport

Links
- Website: truevisions.co.th

Availability

Streaming media
- True ID/TrueVisions NOW: Thailand Only Live

True Sports is a Thai group of sport channels operated by cable and satellite pay-TV provider TrueVisions. True Sport channels are available exclusively on TrueVisions. The number of channels are depends on the package.

True Sports holds exclusive rights to broadcast Thai League T1, NFL, NBA as well as the tennis programmes from ATP Tour, WTA Tour and US Open. It also airs magazine shows from FIFA, ITTF and ATP.

== True Sports channels ==
=== Current channels ===
==== True Sports 5 ====
True Sports 5 firstly launched on 1 August 2007 until it was replaced by pay-per-view True Sport Club Channels on 10 January 2009. True Sport 5 has relaunched to covers Golf.

==== True Sports 7 ====
True Sports 7 replaced Special Sports on 1 November 2012. It mainly airs Badminton, Volleyball and Snooker matches featuring Thai athletics.

==== True Sports 1 ====

True Sports 1 launched in May 2010. It was the first high-definition dedicated sport channel in Thailand. It mainly broadcasts NFL, NBA, Badminton and Snooker matches in HD format.

==== True Sports 2 ====

True Sports 2 launched in 2012. It was broadcasting European football in high-definition format including Premier League, La Liga, Serie A, UEFA Champions League and UEFA Europa League. True Sport HD 2 also simulcasted the Premier League Content Service, a dedicated Premier League channel produced by Premier League Productions until TrueVisions lost its rights to broadcast Premier League.

True Sports HD 2 mainly airs Thai football competitions including Thai League T1, Thai FA Cup and Thai League Cup.

==== True Sports 3 ====

True Sports 3 launched in 2013. It was serving as an extra channel for live coverages of various sport events.

==== True Sports 4 ====

True Sports 4 originally launched as True Sport Extra 1 on 1 August 2007, was using as extra channel for live coverage of Premier League matches and later added rugby union matches from Setanta Sports Asia. It was rebranded as True Sport 8 in July 2013 then upgraded to HD broadcast channel True Sport HD 4 in August 2013. It simultaneously air Setanta Sports Asia and live football coverage when needs.

==== True Tennis ====

True Tennis launched as UBC Zoccer in 2004. It was aired programmes from football club channels including MUTV, LFC TV, Arsenal TV and Chelsea TV. True Sport 4 replaced UBC Zoccer on 1 August 2007. It was broadcasting golf from PGA Tour and tennis before converted to HD tennis-dedicated channel True Tennis HD. It airs tennis programmes mostly from ATP Tour, WTA Tour and US Open.

=== Defunct channels ===
==== True Sport Club Channels ====
True Sport Club Channels are a set of football dedicated pay-per-view channels launched on 10 January 2009 replacing True Sport 5. It mainly broadcast Premier League matches of Big Four including magazine programmes from club channels and Premier League matches from another teams. True Sport Club Channel M broadcasts Manchester United, True Sport Club Channel L for Liverpool FC, True Sport Club Channel A for Arsenal and True Sport Club Channel C for Chelsea FC.

==== True Sport 1 (Legacy) ====
True Sport 1 originally launched as SuperSport, later rebranded to SuperSport Gold, reflecting the channel's availability on the then high-tier Gold package. It was the first 24 hours premium sport dedicated channel in Thailand. SuperSport Gold airs Premier League, Serie A, Bundesliga, NFL and tennis programmes. SuperSport Gold was replaced by SuperSport in November 2004.

On 1 August 2007, SuperSport was rebranded as True Sport 1. It was broadcasting English Premier League matches and magazines related to the Premier League, best matches of football leagues such as La Liga, Serie A, UEFA Champions League, UEFA Europa League and UEFA Super Cup including FIFA Football Mundial and The Football Review until 2016.

In August 2016. True Sport 1 was broadcasting the rewind sports program including WTA Tour tennis, World Snooker and BWF Badminton along with FIFA Football Mundial and The Football Review show until 31 December 2016.

On 1 January 2017, True Sport 1 was broadcasting the schedule from True Sport HD (NBA, NFL, BWF Badminton, World Snooker etc.) switch live Thai League 2 (T2) football match until ceased on 8 June 2018.

==== True Sport 3 (Legacy) ====
True Sport 3 originally launched as UBC Sport Plus in November 2004 to serve as an extra channel for live coverage of sporting events. When UBC rebranded into the TrueVisions brand on 23 January 2007, the channel was also rebranded as True Sport Plus, eventually renamed on 1 August 2007 as True Sport 3. It broadcasts Extreme sports, Water sports, American sports including NFL and NBA also Motor sports until 31 December 2016.

On 1 January 2017, True Sport 3 was broadcasting the schedule from True Sport HD3 (BWF Badminton, World Snooker, motor sports etc.) switch live Thai League 2 (T2) football match and WDSF until ceased on 8 June 2018 along with True Sport 1.

==== SuperSport Asian Games ====
Created for the occasion of the 1998 Asian Games hosted in Bangkok, the commercial-free channel presented sports from the Games not shown by existing terrestrial broadcasters as well as sports popular among Thais, alongside magazines related to the Games. The channel was also supplemented by select sports also shown live on SuperSport 2's channel space whenever there were no other competitions scheduled to be shown on the said channel.

The channel ran between 28 November to 21 December 1998 and was assigned channel number 29 on UBC.

==== True Sports 6 ====
True Sports 6 originally launched as True Sport Extra 2 on 1 August 2007. It was using as extra channel for live coverage sports along with True Sport Extra 1. True Sport 6 replaced True Sport Extra 2 on 1 April 2010. It mainly broadcasts Boxing.

==== True Sports 2 (Legacy) ====
True Sports 2 originally launched as SuperSport 2 and was rebranded to SuperSport upon the renaming of the main channel. The channel was often used as a backup channel whenever competitions were occurring at the same time. SuperSport was replaced by SuperSport Action in November 2004. SuperSport Action airs WWE programming and pay-per-view events, fighting sports, extreme sports, water sports and local sports.

On 1 August 2007, SuperSport Action was rebranded as True Sport 2. True Sport 2 now mainly airs Thai League T1 and other football related live coverage and programmes.

== Sport rights ==
=== Multisport event ===
Name	Nationality	Broadcast details
Olympic Games	(United Nations)	Rights for both Winter and Summer events until 2032
SEA Games	(ASEAN)	
ASEAN Para Games	(ASEAN)	

=== Football ===
Name	Nationality	Broadcast details
Thai League T1	(Thailand)	Rights until 2024-25
Thai League 2	(Thailand)	Rights until 2024-25
Thai FA Cup	(Thailand)	Rights until 2024-25
Thai League Cup	(Thailand)	Rights until 2024-25
UEFA European Championship	(Europe)	Exclusive live rights for all 51 matches in 2024
Premier League	(England)	Exclusive live rights until 2024-25
DFB Pokal	(Germany)	Exclusive live rights until 2029-30
Serie A	(Italy)	Exclusive live rights until 2026-27
Coppa Italia	(Italy)	Exclusive live rights until 2026-27
Supercoppa Italiana	(Italy)	Exclusive live rights until 2026-27
Supercopa de España	(Spain)	Exclusive live rights

=== American Football ===
Name	Nationality	Broadcast details
National Football League	(United States)	

=== Basketball ===
Name	Nationality	Broadcast details
National Basketball Association	(United States) (Canada)	Rights until 2024-25

=== Badminton ===
Name	Nationality	Broadcast details
Badminton World Federation	(United Nations)	
Badminton Asia		

=== Motorsport ===
Name	Nationality	Broadcast details
BRIC Superbike Championship	(Thailand)	
Thailand Super Series	(Thailand)	

=== Tennis ===
Name	Nationality	Broadcast details
WTA Tour	(United Nations)	

=== Muay Thai ===
Name	Nationality	Broadcast details
Rangsit Stadium	(Thailand)	

=== Mixed Martial Arts ===
Name	Nationality	Broadcast details
Ultimate Fighting Championship	(United States)	
