= VOKFM =

Kota Kinabalu; Malaysia
- Broadcast area: Sabah, Malaysia

Programming
- Language: Malaysian language (Sabah Malay)
- Format: Contemporary hits

History
- First air date: 16 September 2017; 8 years ago

Links
- Website: www.vokfmsabah.com

VOKFM (Voice of Kinabalu FM) is a radio station from Kota Kinabalu, Sabah, Malaysia. The station features local topics by promoting local cultures to younger listeners. They offer a "More Music, Less Talk" concept with a local touch. It was launched on 16 September 2017 during the celebration of Malaysia Day.

== Announcers ==
The current radio announcers are:

- Rey Kimara
- Danny Majingga
- Berry Ferhan Shah

== Talk Shows ==
Music Automation

- Weekdays - 24 HRS
