= Arewa24 =

Nigerian television channel

AREWA24
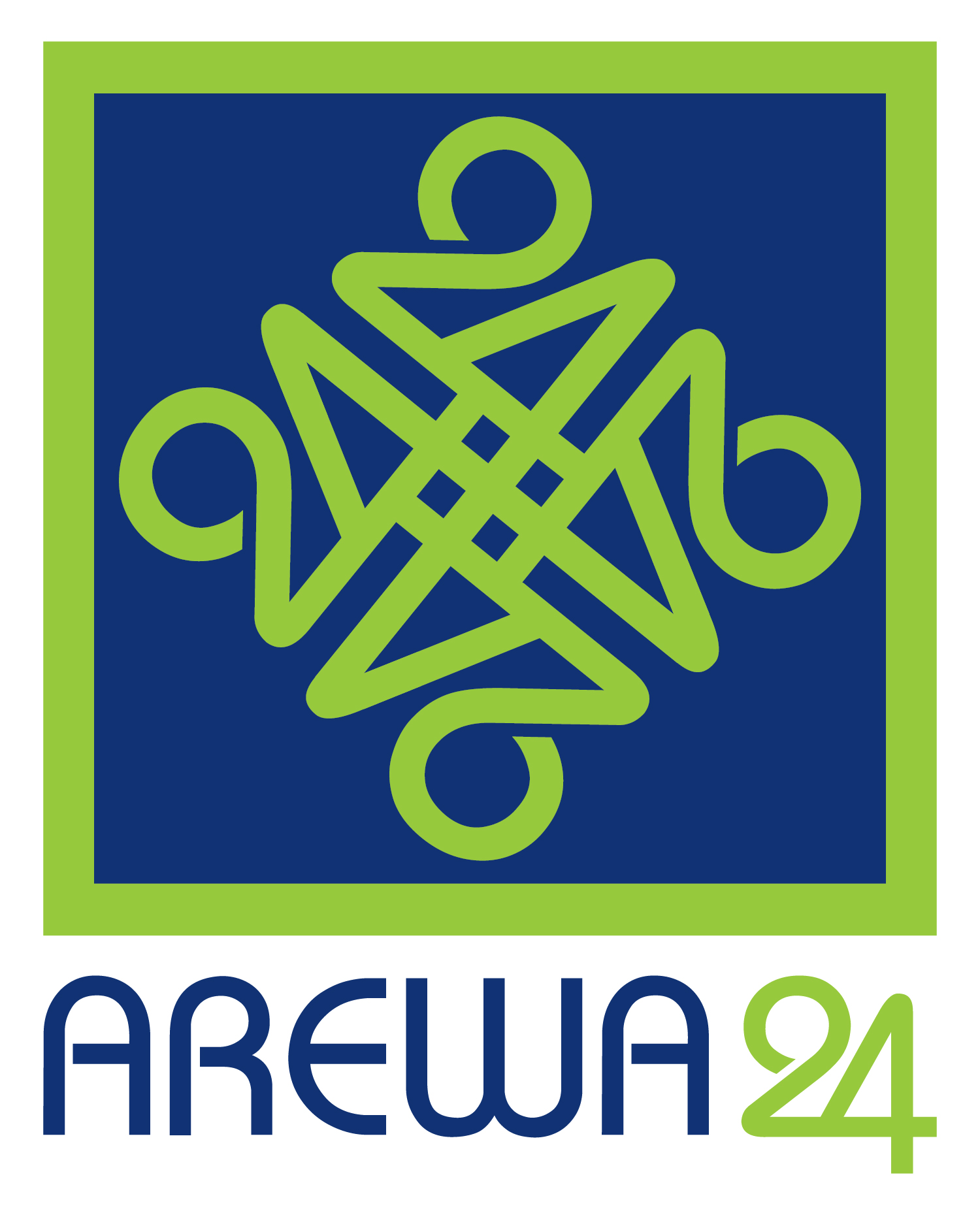
- Country: Nigeria
- Broadcast area: Nigeria, West Africa, Middle East
- Headquarters: Kano, Nigeria

Programming
- Language: Hausa
- Picture format: 16:9 1080i HDTV

Ownership
- Owner: Network AREWA24 Limited

History
- Launched: June 28, 2014; 12 years ago

Links
- Website: arewa24.com

Availability

Streaming media
- AREWA24 On Demand: Streaming service

AREWA24 is a Nigerian satellite television channel launched on June 28, 2014, dedicated to broadcasting in the Hausa language. It is the first 24/7 free-to-air Hausa-language television channel, offering a wide range of entertainment, lifestyle, and cultural programming tailored to Hausa-speaking audiences across Nigeria, West Africa, and the global diaspora.

== History ==
AREWA24 was established to fill a gap in locally produced Hausa-language content. The channel was launched on the Nilesat Satellite platform (Nilesat 102, 12226 MHz) and later expanded its reach through Eutelsat 16A.

The initiative was supported by Equal Access International (EAI), a non-governmental organization focused on using media for social change. EAI's goal was to create a platform that promotes peacebuilding and counters violent extremism through culturally relevant programming.

== Programming ==
Arewa24's flagship morning show, Gari Ya Waye, hosted by Dinah Mu’azu and Nasiru Sani, offers segments covering culture, sports, music, current events, art, health, employment, and entrepreneurship.

The channel’s programming spans multiple genres, including drama, comedy, lifestyle, youth, and international content:

In addition to original content, AREWA24 broadcasts a selection of international programming, including popular Indian and Turkish dramas dubbed or subtitled in Hausa.

== Social impact ==
A study has shown that Arewa24's content fosters tolerance, peaceful coexistence, and respect for diverse cultures and religions among viewers. The channel has partnered with organizations like the MacArthur Foundation, Ford Foundation, United Nations, WHO, Nigeria Centre for Disease Control, Equal Access International, Wild Africa Fund, and Beyond Conflict to produce programs addressing issues such as girl education, corruption, women's rights, health challenges, interreligious violence, youth employment, and conservation.

== Geographic reach ==
The channel broadcasts to over 45 million Hausa speakers across Nigeria, Niger, Chad, Cameroon, Ghana, Mali, Togo, Benin, Burkina Faso, Senegal, and Gambia.

== Audience demographics ==
A 2023 study focusing on Hausa hip hop programming on AREWA24 in Kano Metropolis provided insights into the channel's audience profile:

=== Age distribution ===
- 18–25 years: 29.1%
- 26–30 years: 38.1%
- 31–39 years: 17.5%
- 40 years and above: 15.3%

=== Gender distribution ===
- Male: 63.5%
- Female: 36.5%

=== Occupational background ===
- Students: 43.4%
- Civil Servants: 25.4%
- Businessmen/Women: 17.5%
- Others: 13.7%

== Awards and recognition ==
Selected Awards and Honors
Year	Award	Description	Reference
2016	Africa Magic Viewers’ Choice Award	Won the Best Indigenous Language Movie/TV Series category.	
2020	City People's Award for Excellence	Honored for excellence in indigenous broadcasting and cultural media development in northern Nigeria.	
