= Sky Box Office (New Zealand TV channel) =

- Country: New Zealand

Programming
- Picture format: 16:9 (HDTV)

Ownership
- Owner: Sky Network Television

Links
- Website: Official Site

Sky Box Office is a video on demand movie rental service operated in New Zealand by Sky. Films currently premiere on Sky Box Office a few months after their release. The channel previously broadcast PPV sporting events, before Sky Arena was created.

== Former logos ==
2008–2016

2016–2019
