= KK12FM =

Former radio station in Kota Kinabalu (2017–2023)

Kota Kinabalu; Malaysia
- Broadcast area: Sabah, Malaysia
- Frequency: 89.5 FM

Programming
- Languages: English, with some Malaysian language (Sabah Malay)
- Format: Contemporary hits

History
- First air date: 17 April 2017; 8 years ago
- Last air date: 1 March 2023; 2 years ago

Links
- Website: kk12fm.com

KK12FM was a radio station from Sabah, Malaysia. The station featured local topics among the urban population of Kota Kinabalu.

== Announcers ==
The radio announcers were:

- Gee – Tick Talk with Gee (Mondays, Wednesdays, Fridays: 5 pm – 7 pm)
- Amy D (also known as Aunty Patrin) – Reality Bites (Mondays, Wednesdays, Fridays: 11 am – 1 pm)
- Ben Uzair – Make It Happen with Ben Uzair (Tuesdays, Thursdays: 11 am – 1 pm, weekends: 8 am – 10 am)
- Apeng – Rojak Weekday (Tuesdays, Thursdays: 5 pm – 7 pm)
- Asha
