= AKBC =

- Uyo, Akwa Ibom; Nigeria
- City: Uyo
- Channels: Digital: 45 (UHF)
- Branding: AKBC Channel 45 UHF

Ownership
- Owner: Akwa Ibom State

History
- Founded: 1988

Links
- Website: www.akbconline.org//

Akwa Ibom State Broadcasting Corporation (abbreviated AKBC) UHF channel 45, is a state-owned television station in Uyo, Akwa Ibom. Akwa Ibom Broadcasting Corporation was established on 4 April 1988 and is the first and only local television station. AKBC provides both television and radio services. It transmits in 90.528MHZ. AKBC television transmits from Ntak Inyang.

AKBC was commissioned officially by the military Governor of Akwa Ibom, Idongesit Nkanga in 1991.
