= SBS V-Radio =

South Korean digital radio station

SBS V-Radio is South Korea's second digital radio station. It is owned by the Seoul Broadcasting System.

== Programs ==
SBS V-Radio was a radio station that ran mostly programs commissioned from SBS Love FM and SBS Power FM along with some original programming. In 2016 it was reformatted to simulcast internet radio station SBS GorealRadio M, a non-stop music station.
