= Equal Access =

Nonprofit organization for international human rights

Equal Access International
- Abbreviation: EAI
- Formation: 2000
- Founder: Ronni Goldfarb
- Founded at: Washington, D.C.
- Type: not for profit organization
- Location(s): United States Asia Africa Middle East

Equal Access International (EAI) is an international not for profit organization (501(c)(3)), headquartered in Washington, D.C., and working in Asia, Africa and the Middle East. A communications for social change non-governmental organization that combines the power of media with community mobilization, EAI creates customized communications strategies and outreach solutions that address the most critical challenges affecting people in the developing world such as women & girls’ empowerment, youth life skills & livelihoods, human rights, health and civic participation & governance.

== History ==
Founded by Ronni Goldfarb in 2000, the foundation believes that people everywhere are entitled to Equal Access to information and education and should have the opportunity to join the dialogue as both recipients and contributors of that information.

Equal Access International works with local NGOs and community leaders in Nepal, Afghanistan, Pakistan, Cambodia, the Philippines, Nigeria, Burkina Faso, Niger, Chad, Cameroon, and Kenya as well as with developmental agencies, foundations, governments, local media talent and the private sector in the design and delivery of its communication initiatives.

In 2014, Equal Access International launched Arewa24, a 24/7 television channel based in Kano, Nigeria, broadcasting a range of programming in Hausa.

Equal Access International receives support from the Ford Foundation, the William and Flora Hewlett Foundation, the Asia Foundation, the United Nations Educational, Scientific and Cultural Organization (UNESCO), the United Nations Population Fund and the US Agency for International Development (USAID), the United Nations World Food Program and the World Bank.

Goldfarb, the founder of Equal Access, is in the Board of Directors. She worked with the United Nations Development Program (UNDP) to create the Equal Access/UNDP Digital Broadcast Initiative and to launch an Asia Pacific Regional Information and Education Network, the Equal Access Asia Development Channel.
