= SBS Eight O'Clock News =

Flagship newscast of South Korean broadcaster SBS

- SBS 8 뉴스
- Created by: SBS
- Developed by: SBS News Division
- Presented by: Weekdays: Sagong Sunggeun; Joo Si-eun; Weekends: Lee Hyun-young
- Narrated by: Weekdays: Joo Si-eun (headlines); Weekends: Lee Hyun-young
- Country of origin: South Korea
- Original language: Korean

Production
- Camera setup: Multiple-camera setup
- Running time: 70 minutes (Seoul, weekdays, including commercials); 40 minutes (Provincial areas, Weekdays, including commercials); 45 minutes (Seoul, weekends, including commercials); 15 minutes (Provincial areas, weekends, including commercials)

Original release
- Network: SBS TV; SBS Love FM
- Release: 9 December 1991 – present

SBS Eight O'Clock News (also known as SBS 8 News (SBS 8 뉴스 in Korean)) is a South Korean television news broadcasting show broadcast by Seoul Broadcasting System.

Originally anchored by Maeng Hyung-kyu on weekdays and Jung Sung-hwan on weekends. It has been aired since 9 December 1991. The newscast is aired from 7:50 pm to 9 pm KST on weekdays since 21 September 2020 and from 8 pm to 8:45 pm KST on weekends. Sagong Sunggeun and Lee Hyun-young serve as the current anchors for weekday and weekend editions respectively.

== History ==
On 19 September 1991, SBS defined that it would air its main news bulletin at 8pm, an attempt to compete against the "frontal confrontation" between KBS News 9 and MBC Newsdesk, which occupied the 9pm timeslot. On 23 March 1992, SBS News Show at 10pm became the weekend edition of SBS 8 News due to low ratings. By 2003, it had won several awards, among them its coverage of the scandal of Vice-President Yang Gil-Seul, usage of Agent Orange in the DMZ, corruption at the Korean Navy in 1993, among others.

== Segments ==
=== Current segments ===
Since 21 September 2020, most of the segments (except the sports news and weather) has been placed on the second part, nicknamed S-Pick.

- Mobile Coverage - this seems to be a segment similar to MBC Newsdesk's Camera Launch, KBS News 9's Tracing 1234 and JTBC Newsroom's Close Camera where reporters cover stories in-depth based on reports from citizens.
- What is The Truth? - this is a segment where Lee Kyung-won appears in-studio to fact-check statements given by politicians or important events that happened within the country. Towards the end of the segment, they decide if the statement is true through 5 categories: Facts (사실), Almost True (거의 사실), True & False (사실 & 거짓), Almost Untrue (거의 거짓) and Lies (거짓). A mascot named Factkio (팩트키오) also appears during the broadcast.
- Panda to The End - a segment similar to JTBC Newsroom's Exploration Plus, it's a recurring segment where Kim Jong-won cover a certain story in-depth. The segment uses a panda as its mascot.
- Healthy Life - a segment where medical reporter Cho Dong-chan analyzes issues related to health.
- Cultural Line - a Friday-only segment where reporters do stories related to entertainment, education and other aspects of culture.
- SBS Sports News - this is a segment where Kim Yoon-sang (on weekdays) and Lee Yoon-ah (on weekends) present sports news. On 30 March 2020, Lee Seung-gi made an appearance towards the end of the segment as a part of their SBS intern special episode of Master in the House. This episode also showed Cha Eun-woo hosting the radio broadcast, while Yang Se-hyung served as Lee's backup in case of unexpected circumstances. Shin Sung-rok and Kim Dong-hyun helped out in the production side.
- SBS Weather - the weather segment presented by Nam Yoo-jin on weekdays and Saturdays, and Yang Tae-bin on Sundays.

=== Former segments ===
- Inside the Stock Market - it was a compilation of eight economy-related stories where reporters from the economy and securities team also show the stock market trades through computer graphics.
- Economic Indicators - it is similar with Inside the Stock Market above, only aired on weekdays.
- Today in History - it shows a significant historical event that happened that day.
- Issue Report: An In-depth Look/Field Report: Going Without Reservations/We Have a Tip! - established on 23 March 2019, these three segments seem to be similar to Mobile Coverage and Panda to the End.

== Anchors ==
Sagong Sunggeun and Joo Si-eun anchor the weekday edition since 21 July 2025, while Lee Hyun-young helm the weekend edition since 19 April 2025. Kim Sun-jae does the sports news on weekdays, and Lee Yoon-ji does it on weekends. The weather forecast is presented by Nam Yoo-jin on weekday and Saturday, while Ann Soo-bin does it on Sunday.

=== Main presenters ===
Role	Name	Duration	Notes
Main anchor (weekday)	Maeng Hyung-kyu 맹형규	9 December 1991—18 September 1995	
Main anchor (weekday)	Kim Hyung-min 김형민	As weekend main anchor: 28 October 1994—24 September 1995 As weekday main anchor: 19 September 1995—11 October 1996 19 October 1998—7 August 2000	
Main anchor (weekday)	Song Do-kyun 송도균	14 October 1996—27 June 1997	This was during SBS 9 O'Clock News.
Main anchor (weekday)	Jeon Yong-hak 전용학	30 June 1997—16 October 1998	
Main anchor (weekday)	Lee Young-joon 이영춘	As weekend main anchor: 24 October 1994—16 April 2000 As weekday main anchor: 8 August 2000—27 February 2004 As one-time weekend main anchor: 29 February 2004	He also served as the director of SBS' Suwon bureau.
Main anchor (weekday)	Park Sang-kyu 박상규	1 March 2004—28 October 2005	He's currently the director for Channel A's news bureau.
Main anchor (weekday)	Shin Dong-wook 신동욱	31 October 2005—18 March 2011 1 January 2015—16 December 2016	He was the longest-serving main anchor of the newscast and currently the member of the National Assembly from People Power Party.
Main anchor (weekday)	Kim Sung-joon 김성준	21 March 2011—31 December 2014 19 December 2016—19 May 2017	He was convicted of illegally filming a woman, and is currently serving a six-month prison sentence.
Main anchor (weekday)	Kim Hyun-woo 김현우	As weekend main anchor: 24 December 2016—21 May 2017 As weekday main anchor: 22 May 2017—18 July 2025	He was step down from the position on 18 July 2025 for overseas training in the United States.
Main anchor (weekday)	Sagong Sunggeun 사공성근	21 July 2025—present	Born in 1990, He becomes the youngest male news anchor on terrestrial television, surpassing Cho Hyun-yong (born 1982), which takes over as a male anchor of MBC Newsdesk a year before.
Sub-anchor (weekday)	Choi Young-im 최영임	23 March 1992—15 April 1994	
Sub-anchor (weekday)	Han Soo-jin 한수진	As weekend sub-anchor: 5 June 1993—17 April 1994 As weekday sub-anchor: 18 April 1994—29 March 2002	She also served as anchor during SBS 9:00 News.
Sub-anchor (weekday)	Kwak Sang-eun 곽상은	As weekday sub-anchor: 1 April 2002—27 February 2004 As one-time weekend sub-anchor: 29 February 2004	She is currently SBS News' policy and culture team leader.
Sub-anchor (weekday)	Kim So-won 김소원	As weekend sub-anchor: 6 April 2002—28 February 2004 As weekday sub-anchor: 1 March 2004—18 March 2011	She was the longest-serving sub-anchor of the newscast.
Sub-anchor (weekday)	Park Sun-young 박선영	As weekend sub-anchor: 10 May 2008—20 March 2011 As weekday sub-anchor: 21 March 2011—18 July 2014	
Sub-anchor (weekday)	Choi Hye-rim 최혜림	As weekend sub-anchor: 23 July 2011—15 January 2012 7 July 2012—14 September 2014 As weekday sub-anchor: 19 December 2016—31 March 2023	
Sub-anchor (weekday)	Kim Ga-hyun 김가현	3 April 2023—18 July 2025	
Sub-anchor (weekday)	Joo Si-eun 주시은	As weekend sub-anchor: 8 November 2020—2 April 2023 As weekday sub-anchor: 21 July 2025—present	
Main anchor (weekend)	Jung Sung-hwan 정성환	14 December 1991—22 March 1992	
Main anchor (weekend)	Jung Sung-geun 정성근	7 July 1995—25 April 1993 7 October 2000—31 March 2002	
Main anchor (weekend)	Lee Seung-yeol 이승열	1 May 1993—22 October 1994	
Main anchor (weekend)	Shin Won-soo 신완수	26 October 1996—29 June 1997	
Main anchor (weekend)	Park Soo-taek 박수택	22 April 2000—1 October 2000	
Main anchor (weekend)	Hong Ji-man 홍지만	6 March 2002—28 February 2004	
Main anchor (weekend)	Park Jin-ho 박진호	6 March 2004—20 March 2011	
Main anchor (weekend)	Song Wook 송욱	26 March 2011—17 July 2011	
Main anchor (weekend)	Pyeon Sang-wook 편상욱	23 July 2011—21 February 2016	He is currently the anchor of SBS Nightline.
Main anchor (weekend)	Park Hyun-suk 박현석	27 February 2016—18 December 2016	He is currently the weekday anchor for the first two parts of Morning Wide.
Main anchor (weekend)	Kim Yong-tae 김용태	27 May 2017—1 July 2018 7 November 2020—2 April 2023	
Main anchor (weekend)	Kim Bum-joo 김범주	7 July 2018—1 November 2020	He filled in for Kim Hyun-woo upon his marriage to Lee Yeo-jin and leave from 16 to 20 December 2019.
Main anchor (weekend)	Jung Yoo-min 정유미	8 April 2023—13 April 2025	First female reporter becoming sole anchor of SBS 8 News since 1996.
Main anchor (weekend)	Lee Hyun-young 이현영	19 April 2025—present	
Sub-anchor (weekend)	Kim Young 김영	5 July 1992—29 November 1992	
Sub-anchor (weekend)	Song Sun-kyung 송선경	6 December 1992—25 April 1993	
Sub-anchor (weekend)	Choi Young-joo 최영주	23, April 1994—23 October 1994	
Sub-anchor (weekend)	Lee Ji-hyun 이지현	29 October 1994—29 June 1997	
Sub-anchor (weekend)	Lee Hyun-kyung 이현경	6 July 1997—28 June 1998	
Sub-anchor (weekend)	Go Hee-kyung 고희경	4 July 1998—16 April 2000	
Sub-anchor (weekend)	Choi Young-ah 최영아	22 April 2000—29 April 2001	
Sub-anchor (weekend)	Kim Sung-kyung 김성경	5 May 2001—31 March 2002	
Sub-anchor (weekend)	Yoon Hyun-jin 윤현진	6 March 2004—4 May 2008	
Sub-anchor (weekend)	Jang Sun-yi 장선이	26 March 2011—17 July 2011	
Sub-anchor (weekend)	Jung Mi-sun 정미선	As weekday sub-anchor: 21 July 2014—16 December 2016 As weekend sub-anchor: 21 January 2012—1 July 2012 27 May 2017—17 March 2019	She is currently a co-anchor on the first two parts of Morning Wide.
Sub-anchor (weekend)	Lee Hye-seung 이혜승	20 September 2014—18 December 2016	
Sub-anchor (weekend)	Jang Ye-won 장예원	24 December 2016—21 May 2017	
Sub-anchor (weekend)	Kim Min-hyung 김민형	23 March 2019—1 November 2020	
Sub-anchor (weekend)	Joo Si-eun 주시은	8 November 2020—2 April 2023	

== Broadcast times ==
Year	Date	Time	Airing	Title	Notes
1991	9 December	20:00-20:30	Every day	SBS 8 News	first broadcast under the current title; SBS' first flagship newscast
1992	30 March	20:00-20:45	Weekdays	SBS 8 News	runtime extension
1992	5 July	20:00-20:45	Every day	SBS 8 News	absorbed SBS News Show
1993	26 April	Weekdays: 20:00-20:45	Every day	SBS 8 News	runtime extension on weekends
1993	26 April	Weekends: 20:00-20:20	Every day	SBS 8 News	runtime extension on weekends
1993	31 May	Weekdays: 20:00-20:45	Every day	SBS 8 News	runtime extension on weekends
1993	31 May	Weekends: 20:00-20:30	Every day	SBS 8 News	runtime extension on weekends
1993	18 October	Weekdays: 20:00-20:45	Every day	SBS 8 News	runtime extension on weekends
1993	18 October	Weekends: 20:00-20:35	Every day	SBS 8 News	runtime extension on weekends
1994	18 April	Weekdays: 20:00-20:45	Every day	SBS 8 News	runtime extension on weekends
1994	18 April	Weekends: 20:00-20:40	Every day	SBS 8 News	runtime extension on weekends
1994	24 October	20:00-20:45	Weekdays	SBS 8 News	separated with weekend newscast SBS News 2000
1997	3 March	21:00-21:45	Weekdays	SBS 9:00 News	title and weekday timeslot change
1997	19 May	21:00-21:50	Weekdays	SBS 9:00 News	runtime extension
1997	30 June	Weekdays: 20:00-20:45	Every day	SBS 8 News	integration with News Q; return to the current title
1997	30 June	Weekends: 20:00-20:30	Every day	SBS 8 News	timeslot variations
1997	27 October	Weekdays: 20:00-20:50	Every day	SBS 8 News	timeslot variations
1997	27 October	Weekends: 20:00-20:35	Every day	SBS 8 News	timeslot variations
1998	2 March	Weekdays: 20:00-20:40	Every day	SBS 8 News	timeslot variations
1998	2 March	Weekends: 20:00-20:35	Every day	SBS 8 News	timeslot variations
1998	19 October	Weekdays: 20:00-20:45	Every day	SBS 8 News	timeslot variations
1998	19 October	Weekends: 20:00-20:35	Every day	SBS 8 News	timeslot variations
1999	5 April	Weekdays: 20:00-20:40	Every day	SBS 8 News	timeslot variations
1999	5 April	Weekends: 20:00:20:35	Every day	SBS 8 News	timeslot variations
2004	1 March	Weekdays: 20:00-20:40	Every day	SBS 8 News	timeslot variations
2004	1 March	Weekends: 20:00-20:35	Every day	SBS 8 News	timeslot variations
2008	28 April	Weekdays: 20:00-20:45	Every day	SBS 8 News	absorbed SBS Sports News on weekends
2008	28 April	Weekends: 20:00-20:40	Every day	SBS 8 News	absorbed SBS Sports News on weekends
2012	5 November	Weekdays: 20:00-20:50	Every day	SBS 8 News	absorbed SBS Sports News on weekdays
2012	5 November	Weekends: 20:00-20:35	Every day	SBS 8 News	absorbed SBS Sports News on weekdays
2013	11 March	Weekdays: 20:00-20:55	Every day	SBS 8 News	timeslot variations
2013	11 March	Weekends: 20:00-20:50	Every day	SBS 8 News	timeslot variations
2013	1 July	Weekdays: 20:00-20:55	Every day	SBS 8 News	timeslot variations
2013	1 July	Weekends: 20:00-20:45	Every day	SBS 8 News	timeslot variations
2019	15 April	Weekdays: 19:55-20:55	Every day	SBS 8 News	timeslot variations
2019	15 April	Weekends: 20:00-20:45	Every day	SBS 8 News	timeslot variations
2019	13 May	Weekdays: 20:00-20:55	Every day	SBS 8 News	timeslot variations
2019	13 May	Weekends: 20:00-20:45	Every day	SBS 8 News	timeslot variations
2020	21 September	Weekdays: 19:50-21:00	Every day	SBS 8 News	timeslot variations
2020	21 September	Weekends: 20:00-20:45	Every day	SBS 8 News	timeslot variations

== Regional newscasts outside Seoul ==
Local SBS affiliates outside Seoul cutaway from the national 8 NEWS during the second half of the program, to broadcast their respective flagship regional newscasts. A typical evening newscast in these areas runs for 20 minutes on weekdays and 10 minutes on weekends. Local newscasts have the option to self-produce sports and weather segments, but others chose to opt back in to SBS for such segments; regardless, after the weather segment, the newscast always ends by the local affiliate's newscast title and anchors.

Station	Local Newscast	Hosts
KNN	KNN NEWS eye	Kim Je-hyun and Kim Da-rom
TBC	TBC 8 NEWS	Kwon Joon-bum and Kim Myung-mi (weekdays), Lee Hyang-won and Kim Da-eun (weekends)
UBC	UBC PRIME NEWS	Yeon Jung-taek and Jang Soo-jung
TJB	TJB 8 NEWS	Roh Dong-hyun and Kim Hyun-ji
G1	G1 8 NEWS	Kim Woo-jin and Park Sun-young
CJB	CJB 8 NEWS	Hwang Soo-dong and Yeon Kyu-ok
JTV	JTV 8 NEWS	Lee Seung-hwan and Seo Joo-young
KBC	KBC 8 NEWS	Lee In-soo and Kang Min-kyung (weekdays), Go Eun-cheon (weekends)
JIBS	JIBS 8 NEWS	Lee Yong-tak and Kim Ji-hyun (weekdays), Kim Min-hyung and Lee Jung-min (Saturdays)

== See also ==
- KBS News 9
- MBC Newsdesk
- JTBC Newsroom
