= Television in South Korea =

In South Korea, there are a number of national television networks, the three largest of which are KBS, MBC, and SBS. Most of the major television studios are located on Yeouido and Sangam-dong, Seoul. South Korea became the fourth adopter in Asia when television broadcasting began on 12 May 1956 with the opening of HLKZ-TV, a commercially operated television station. HLKZ-TV was established by the RCA Distribution Company (KORCAD) in Seoul with 186–192 MHz, 100-watt output, and 525 scanning lines.

Important genres of television shows include serial dramas, historical dramas, variety shows, game shows, news programs, and documentaries. All three networks have produced increasingly lavish historical dramas in recent years. Some South Korean television programs are available on satellite and multicultural channels in foreign countries. South Korean television dramas have been widely popular in other East Asian, South Asian and Southeast Asian countries, and became popularized internationally at a later stage, with whole sets of videotapes or DVDs of series available with completed subtitles in different languages, online subtitle websites are also created by numerous fan clubs to cater to a global audience. Shopping channels have become quite popular in recent years as well, and the models sometimes put on entertaining acts during product pitches.

Most cable operators in South Korea were consolidated into 3 major telecommunication companies, KT, SK Telecom, and LG Uplus. They also operates Internet Protocol television services. There are approximately 14 million cable TV subscribers nationwide. The cable operator provides TPS to its subscribers. (with the exception of Arirang which is free).

== History ==
Since the beginning of the 1950s, television was introduced to Korea by RCA to sell second-hand black & white TV sets as a marketing scheme. Some TV sets were strategically set up at Pagoda Park, others at the Seoul Station and Gwanghwamun during this time. However it was not until 1956 when South Korea began its own television broadcasting station, the HLKZ-TV, part of the KORCAD (RCA Distribution Company). The first ever Korean television drama, 천국의 문 (The Gates of Heaven) debuted the same year, planning director Choi Chang-Bong spent two and a half months continuously fixing the script, preparing sets and even the first instance of special effects, all for a drama that lasted no longer than fifteen minutes.

Following the establishment of KORCAD TV, the Catholic Kyunghyang Shinmun planned to obtain a television license, without specifying what channel would they use.

The early 1960s saw a phenomenal growth in television broadcasting. On 1 October 1961 the first full-scale television station, HLKA-TV (now known as KBS 1TV), was established and began operation under the Ministry of Culture and Public Information.

Following KBS was Tongyang Broadcasting Corporation's TBC-TV which was launched in 1964, and ran until merged in 1980. It was the first private television network in South Korea.

The second commercial television system, MBC-TV, made its debut in 1969. The advent of MBC-TV brought significant development to the television industry in Korea and after 1969 the television industry was characterized by furious competition among the three networks.

Satellite links were established in June 1970. Early events included the Apollo 15 moon landing and Richard Nixon's visit to Beijing.

The 1970s were highlighted by government intervention into the media system in Korea. In 1972, President Park Chung Hee government imposed censorship upon media through the Martial Law Decree. The government revised the Broadcasting Law under the pretext of improving the quality of television programming. After the revision of the law, the government expanded its control of media content by requiring all television and radio stations to review programming before and after transmission. Although the government argued that its action was taken as a result of growing public criticism of broadcasting media practices, many accused the government of wanting to establish a monopoly over television broadcasting.

The 1980s were the golden years for South Korea's television industry. Growth was phenomenal in every dimension: the number of programming hours per week rose from 56 in 1979 to nearly 88.5 in 1989; the number of television stations increased from 12 in 1979 to 78 by 1989; and the number of television sets grew from four million in 1979 to nearly six million in the same period. Despite producing color televisions for export, color television was not officially introduced in the country until late 1980. Color broadcasting, however, occasioned a renewal of strong competition among the networks. However, the South Korean TV industry was also suffered huge blows in this decade. During Chun Doo-hwan's regime, several newspapers, broadcasters and publications were forcibly closed, or were merged into a single organization. One of which is TBC-TV which was awarded to KBS. TBC-TV was then replaced by KBS 2TV. After the country's 1987 democratic reforms, several regulations were imposed to insulate broadcasters from political influence. For example, the National Assembly established the Foundation for Broadcast Culture to insulate MBC from political influence and KBS.

At the beginning of the 1990s, with the introduction of cable television, the government initiated an experimental multi-channel and multi-purpose cable television service. In addition, South Korea launched its first broadcasting/communication satellite, Mugungwha 1, to 36,000 km above the equator in 1995. The development of an integrated broadband network took the form of B-ISDN immediately after the turn of the century. This decade was a period of great technological change in the South Korean broadcasting industry, which made broadcast media even more important than in the past. In this decade the South Korean broadcasting industry added to the service with new technological developments such as DBS, satellites, and interactive cable systems, all of which have allowed South Korea to participate fully in the information society.

On 22 July 2009, after heated political debates, an amendment of the Media Law passed the National Assembly of South Korea to deregulate the media market of South Korea. On 31 December 2010, four general Cable Television networks were licensed.

Analogue television services ended on 31 December 2012.

== National networks ==
In South Korea, there are four nationwide television networks, three general networks and one educational network as follows:

Name	Channels (Seoul Capital Area)	Channels (Busan region)	Channels (Jeju region)	Launch	Type & Owner
Korean Broadcasting System (KBS) 한국방송공사 韓國放送公社	KBS1 Seoul HLKA-DTV/UHDTV (Channel 9–1); KBS2 Seoul HLKC-DTV (Channel 7–1); KBS News 24 Seoul HLKA-UHDTV (Channel 9–2)	KBS1 Busan HLKB-DTV (Channel 9–1); KBS2 Busan HLKE-DTV (Channel 7–1); KBS News 24 Jeju HLKS-DTV (Channel 9–2)	KBS1 Jeju HLKS-DTV (Channel 9–1); KBS2 Jeju HLCF-DTV (Channel 7–1); KBS News 24 Jeju HLCF-DTV (Channel 9–2)	31 December 1961; 64 years ago (KBS1); 1 December 1980; 45 years ago (KBS2); 3 March 2010; 16 years ago (KBS News 24)	Public broadcasting Government of South Korea
Educational Broadcasting System (EBS) 한국교육방송공사 韓國敎育放送公社	EBS1 TV l HLQL-DTV (Channel 10–1); EBS2 TV l HLQL-DTV (Channel 10–2)	EBS1 TV l HLQL-DTV (Channel 10–1); EBS2 TV l HLQL-DTV (Channel 10–2)	EBS1 TV l HLQL-DTV (Channel 10–1); EBS2 TV l HLQL-DTV (Channel 10–2)	27 December 1990; 35 years ago (EBS 1); 11 February 2015; 11 years ago (EBS 2)	Public broadcasting Government of South Korea
Munhwa Broadcasting Corporation (MBC); MBC 네트워크 株式會社文化放送	Seoul MBC TV HLKV-DTV/UHDTV (Channel 11–1); Seoul MBC News NOW HLKV-DTV/UHDTV (Channel 11–2)	Busan MBC TV HLKU-DTV/UHDTV (Channel 11–1); Busan MBC News NOW HLKV-DTV/UHDTV (Channel 11–2)	Jeju MBC TV HLAJ-DTV/UHDTV (Channel 11–1); Jeju MBC News NOW HLKV-DTV/UHDTV (Channel 11–2)	8 August 1969; 57 years ago (MBC TV); 4 February 2020; 6 years ago (MBC News Now)	Public/Commercial broadcasting The Foundation of Broadcast Culture; The Jeongsu Scholarship Foundation
Seoul Broadcasting System (SBS Network) 한국민영방송연합 (SBS네트워크)	SBS TV HLSQ-DTV/UHDTV (Channel 6–1)	KNN TV HLDG-DTV/UHDTV (Channel 6–1)	JIBS TV HLKJ-DTV (Channel 6–1)	20 March 1991; 35 years ago	Commercial broadcasting Seoul Broadcasting System (Taeyoung Group)
YTN DMB Network; YTN DMB 네트워크	mYTN HLMA-TDMB (Channel 8-B); HD mYTN HLMA-TDMB (Channel 8-B)	KNN DMB (ubc u) HLDG-TDMB (Channel 12-C)	JIBS DMB2 HLKJ-TDMB (Channel 13-C)	1 December 2005; 20 years ago	Commercial broadcasting YTN Group

== List of television channels ==
All of these are free-to-air channels. Furthermore, all of them are the official digital terrestrial television and ATSC providers of the nation (since 2005, approved by the Korean Government).

=== Public broadcasting channels ===
Name	Owner	Launch	Genre	Description
KBS1	KBS	1 October 1961; 65 years ago	News, drama, culture, kids and sports	The channel's callsign is HLKA-DTV and HLKA-UHDTV.
KBS2	KBS	1 December 1964; 61 years ago	Variety, sports and entertainment	Formerly known as TBC, renamed to KBS 2TV in 1980. The channel's callsign is HLSA-DTV.
KBS News 24	KBS	3 March 2010; 16 years ago	News, live events, emergency alerts	ATSC 3.0 only channel, broadcasting in HD format. The channel's callsign is HLKA-UHDTV.
EBS1	EBS	27 December 1990; 35 years ago	Education, News, Kids Entertainment	Formerly known as KBS 3TV, renamed to EBS in 1990. The channel's callsign is HLQL-DTV.
EBS2	EBS	11 February 2015; 11 years ago	Education	ATSC 3.0 only channel, broadcasting in HD format. The channel's callsign is HLQL-DTV.
MBC TV	MBC	8 August 1969; 57 years ago	News and entertainment	The Channel's callsign is HLKV-DTV and HLKV-UHDTV
MBC News Now	MBC	4 February 2020; 6 years ago	News and entertainment	The Channel's callsign is HLKV-DTV and HLKV-UHDTV

=== Commercial broadcasting channels ===
In South Korea, many commercial television networks have been created after the deregulation taken in 1961 till 1990. SBS is responsible in distributing its programming content nationally, but is not responsible for producing local content aired by their affiliates.

==== MBC Networks Channel ====
Local broadcasting companies affiliated with MBC Networks originally started as affiliated broadcasting stations in the same way as SBS Networks.

After Policy for Merger and Abolition of the Press, Munhwa Broadcasting Corporation took over 50% of the shares in local broadcasting stations, and all local broadcasting stations became subsidiaries of Munhwa Broadcasting Corporation.

Due to this background, MBC Networks is currently operating simultaneously with the characteristics of public broadcasting and commercial broadcasting.

Name	Owner	Launch	Covers	Genre	Description
MBC TV	Munhwa Broadcasting Corporation	1 August 1969; 57 years ago	Seoul Metropolitan Area	City news and entertainment	The Channel's callsign is HLKV-DTV and HLKV-UHDTV. MBC Network Headquarters
MBC News Now	Munhwa Broadcasting Corporation	28 January 2020; 6 years ago	Seoul Metropolitan Area	City news and entertainment	The Channel's callsign is HLKV-DTV and HLKV-UHDTV. MBC Network Headquarters
Chuncheon MBC TV	Chuncheon Munhwa Broadcasting Corporation	20 January 1983; 43 years ago	Northern Yeongseo	Local entertainment and news	The Channel's callsign is HLAN-DTV.
Wonju MBC TV	Wonju Munhwa Broadcasting Corporation	26 November 1987; 38 years ago	Southern Yeongseo	Local entertainment and news	The Channel's callsign is HLSB-DTV and HLSB-UHDTV.
MBC Gangwon-yeongdong TV (Gangneung)	MBC Gangwon-yeongdong Broadcasting Corporation	6 September 1985; 41 years ago	Northern Yeongdong	Local entertainment and news	The Channel's callsign is HLAF-DTV and HLAF-UHDTV. Formerly known as Gangneung MBC, renamed to MBC Gangwon-yeongdong (Gangneung) in 2015.
MBC Gangwon-yeongdong TV (Samcheok)	MBC Gangwon-yeongdong Broadcasting Corporation	27 November 1987; 38 years ago	Southern Yeongdong	Local entertainment and news	The Channel's callsign is HLAQ-DTV. Formerly known as Samcheok MBC, renamed to MBC Gangwon-yeongdong (Samcheok) in 2015.
Daejeon MBC TV	Daejeon Munhwa Broadcasting Corporation	24 April 1971; 55 years ago	Daejeon, Sejong City and Chungnam	Local entertainment and news	The Channel's callsign is HLCQ-DTV and HLCQ-UHDTV.
MBC Chungbuk TV (Cheongju)	MBC Chungbuk Broadcasting Corporation	1 April 1983; 43 years ago	Southern Chungbuk	Local entertainment and news	The Channel's callsign is HLAX-DTV. Formerly known as Cheongju MBC, renamed to MBC Chungbuk (Cheongju) in 2016.
MBC Chungbuk TV (Chungju)	MBC Chungbuk Broadcasting Corporation	17 November 1987; 38 years ago	Northern Chungbuk	Local entertainment and news	The Channel's callsign is HLAO-DTV. Formerly known as Chungju MBC, renamed to MBC Chungbuk (Chungju) in 2016.
Gwangju MBC TV	Gwangju Munhwa Broadcasting Corporation	29 August 1970; 56 years ago	Gwangju and Central Northern Jeonnam	Local entertainment and news	The Channel's callsign is HLCN-DTV and HLCN-UHDTV.
Mokpo MBC TV	Mokpo Munhwa Broadcasting Corporation	16 November 1987; 38 years ago	Southwest Jeonnam	Local entertainment and news	The Channel's callsign is HLAM-DTV.
Yeosu MBC TV	Yeosu Munhwa Broadcasting Corporation	21 November 1987; 38 years ago	Eastern Jeonnam	Local entertainment and news	The Channel's callsign is HLAT-DTV.
Jeonju MBC TV	Jeonju Munhwa Broadcasting Corporation	23 April 1971; 55 years ago	Jeonbuk	Local entertainment and news	The Channel's callsign is HLCX-DTV.
Daegu MBC TV	Daegu Munhwa Broadcasting Corporation	18 July 1970; 56 years ago	Daegu, Midwest Southern Gyeongbuk	Local entertainment and news	The Channel's callsign is HLCT-DTV and HLCT-UHDTV.
Andong MBC TV	Andong Munhwa Broadcasting Corporation	23 November 1987; 38 years ago	Northern Gyeongbuk	Local entertainment and news	The Channel's callsign is HLAW-DTV.
Pohang MBC TV	Pohang Munhwa Broadcasting Corporation	24 November 1987; 38 years ago	East Coast Gyeongbuk.	Local entertainment and news	The Channel's callsign is HLAV-DTV.
Busan MBC TV	Busan Munhwa Broadcasting Corporation	24 January 1970; 56 years ago	Busan	Local entertainment and news	The Channel's callsign is HLKU-DTV and HLKU-UHDTV.
Ulsan MBC TV	Ulsan Munhwa Broadcasting Corporation	25 January 1971; 55 years ago	Ulsan	Local entertainment and news	The Channel's callsign is HLAU-DTV and HLAU-UHDTV.
MBC Gyeongnam TV (Jinju)	MBC Gyeongnam Broadcasting Corporation	20 November 1987; 38 years ago	Western Gyeongnam	Local entertainment and news	The Channel's callsign is HLAK-DTV; Formerly known as Jinju MBC, renamed to MBC Gyeongnam (Jinju) in 2011.
MBC Gyeongnam TV (Changwon)	MBC Gyeongnam Broadcasting Corporation	5 October 1972; 54 years ago	Eastern Gyeongnam	Local entertainment and news	The Channel's callsign is HLAP-DTV; Formerly known as Masan MBC(1971–2010) / Changwon MBC(2010–2011), renamed to MBC Gyeongnam (Changwon) in 2011.
Jeju MBC TV	Jeju Munhwa Broadcasting Corporation	1 August 1970; 56 years ago	Jeju	Local entertainment and news	The Channel's callsign is HLAU-DTV. Formerly known as Namyang MBC, renamed to Jeju MBC in 1984.

==== SBS Networks Channel ====
SBS, which was originally established as an independent broadcasting station, was established in 1995 by PSB (Currently, KNN), CJB, TBC, and TJB, and SBS Networks was created around SBS.

Currently, 9 broadcasting stations are affiliated.

Name	Owner	Launch	Covers	Genre	Description
SBS TV	SBS Media Holdings	9 December 1991; 34 years ago	Seoul Capital Area	City news and entertainment	The Channel's callsign is HLSQ-DTV and HLSQ-UHDTV; SBS Network Headquarters
KNN	Korea New Network	14 March 1995; 31 years ago	Busan and Gyeongnam	Local entertainment and news	The Channel's callsign is HLDG-DTV and HLDG-UHDTV. Formerly known as PSB Pusan Broadcasting, renamed to KNN in 2006.
TBC	Daegu Broadcasting Corporation	14 March 1995; 31 years ago	Daegu and Gyeongbuk	Local entertainment and news	The Channel's callsign is HLDE-DTV and HLDE-UHDTV.
KBC	Kwangju Broadcasting Corporation	14 March 1995; 31 years ago	Gwangju and Jeonnam	Local entertainment and news	The Channel's callsign is HLDH-DTV and HLDH-UHDTV.
TJB	Taejon Broadcasting Corporation	14 March 1995; 31 years ago	Daejeon, Sejong City and Chungnam	Local entertainment and news	The Channel's callsign is HLDF-DTV and HLDF-UHDTV.
UBC	Ulsan Broadcasting Corporation	1 September 1997; 29 years ago	Ulsan, eastern part of South Gyeongsang	Local entertainment and news	The Channel's callsign is HLDP-DTV and HLDP-UHDTV.
JTV	Jeonju Television	17 September 1997; 29 years ago	North Jeolla	Local entertainment and news	The Channel's callsign is HLDQ-DTV.
CJB	Cheongju Broadcasting	18 October 1997; 29 years ago	North Chungcheong	Local entertainment and news	The Channel's callsign is HLDR-DTV.
G1	Gangwon No.1 Broadcasting	15 December 2001; 24 years ago	Gangwon	Local entertainment and news	The Channel's callsign is HLCG-DTV and HLCG-UHDTV.
JIBS	Jeju International Broadcasting System	31 May 2002; 24 years ago	Jeju	Local entertainment and news	The Channel's callsign is HLKJ-DTV.

==== YTN DMB Network ====
Founded in 2005, YTN DMB is a broadcasting station that relays the broadcasting of YTN's channel.

In November 2006, a contract was signed with a local broadcasting station affiliated with the SBS network, and in June 2008, YTN DMB network was created, which began broadcasting to local areas.

All channels belonging to the network can only be viewed on devices that support T-DMB.

Name	Owner	Launch	Covers	Genre	Description
mYTN	YTN DMB	1 December 2005; 20 years ago	Seoul Capital Area	Relays of YTN's channels	The Channel's callsign is HLMA-TDMB. YTN DMB Headquarters
HD mYTN	YTN DMB	1 August 2016; 10 years ago	Seoul Capital Area	Relays of YTN's channels	The Channel's callsign is HLMA-TDMB. High-definition channel of mYTN.
KNN DMB ubc u	Korea New Network (Operator); Ulsan Broadcasting Corporation (Scheduling)	1 June 2008; 18 years ago	Busan, Ulsan and Gyeongnam	Local entertainment and news	The Channel's callsign is HLDG-TDMB.
TBC DMB mYTN	Daegu Broadcasting Corporation	1 June 2008; 18 years ago	Daegu and Gyeongbuk	Local entertainment and news	The Channel's callsign is HLDE-TDMB.
KBC JTV-mYTN	Kwangju Broadcasting Corporation (Operator); Jeonju Television (Scheduling)	1 June 2008; 18 years ago	Gwangju, Jeonnam and Jeonbuk	Local entertainment and news	The Channel's callsign is HLDH-TDMB.
TJB u CJB-mYTN	Taejon Broadcasting Corporation (Operator); Cheongju Broadcasting (Scheduling)	1 June 2008; 18 years ago	Daejeon, Sejong City, Chungnam and Chungbuk	Local entertainment and news	The Channel's callsign is HLDF-TDMB.
G1DMB Go G1	Gangwon No.1 Broadcasting	1 June 2008; 18 years ago	Gangwon	Local entertainment and news	The Channel's callsign is HLCG-TDMB.
JIBS DMB 2	Jeju International Broadcasting System	1 June 2008; 18 years ago	Jeju	Local entertainment and news	The Channel's callsign is HLKJ-TDMB.

==== Independent station ====
After 1990, independent broadcasting stations excluding SBS include iTV Kyung-in Broadcasting (formerly iTV Incheon Broadcasting), which opened in 1997 and closed in 2004, and OBS Gyeongin TV, which opened in 2007.

The viewing area of the two broadcasting stations was the same in Seoul Metropolitan Area, and among them, iTV Kyung-in Broadcasting was broadcast to other regions through Pay television and served as a Superstation.

Name	Owner	Launch	Covers	Genre	Description
OBS	Young An Hat Co., Ltd.	28 December 2007; 18 years ago	Seoul Metropolitan Area	Metropolitan entertainment and news	The Channel's callsign is HLQS-DTV.

== Cable TV networks/channels ==
Name	Launch	Group
National Assembly TV	24 May 2004	NATV
Arirang TV	3 February 1997	Arirang
Animax	29 April 2006	JJMediaWorks
AXN	1 March 2016	KC Global Media
B TV	12 January 2009	SK Broadband
BBC Earth	2013	BBC Studios
BBC Lifestyle	2013	BBC Studios
BBC News	2013	BBC Studios
Cartoon Network	11 November 2006	Skydance
Cartoonito(Formerly as Boomerang)	14 November 2015	Skydance
CATCH ON 1	1 November 1995	CJ
CATCH ON 2	1 January 2000	CJ
CBeebies	2013	BBC Studios
Channel A	1 December 2011	Channel A
Channel A Plus	1 July 2015	Channel A
Channel Now	1 April 2006	t.cast
Channel Ever	1 March 2008	t.cast
Channel S	8 April 2021	SK Broadband
Channel View	1 June 2009	t.cast
Channel Wide	3 January 2023	CJ
Ching	May, 2005	KT ENA
Chunghwa TV	1 September 2009	CJ
CineF	1 August 2010	t.cast
Comedy TV	1 October 2000	iHQ
DealSite Economy TV	19 June 2024	
Dramax	1 July 2002	iHQ
Discovery Channel	1 September 2020	Skydance
E Channel	1 October 2000	t.cast
E Like	20 May 2024	t.cast
EBS English	6 April 2007	EBS
EBS Kids	1 January 2018	EBS
EBS Plus 1	1 March 2002	EBS
EBS Plus 2	1 March 2002	EBS
EDaily TV	September, 2007	KG Group
ENA	29 September 2003	KT ENA
ENA Drama	1 July 2002	KT ENA
ENA Play	3 July 2010	KT ENA
ENA Sports	1 August 2014	KT ENA
ENA Story	29 April 2022	KT ENA
Golf & PBA	26 May 2010	IB SPORTS
GS Shop	16 August 1995	GS Group
HealthMedi TV	December, 2013	KT ENA
History (Korea)	22 September 2017	iHQ, A+E
Hyundai Home Shopping	19 November 2001	Hyundai Group
IB SPORTS	1 July 2009	IB SPORTS
i Play	2 July 2012	iHQ
i Show	1 July 2012	iHQ
JEI English TV	2003	JEI Corporation
JEI Kids TV	1 October 2007	JEI Corporation
JTBC	1 December 2011	JTBC
JTBC2	1 March 1995	JTBC
JTBC SPORTS	1 August 2015	JTBC
JTBC4	21 April 2018	JTBC
JTBC GOLF	7 January 2005	JTBC
KBS drama	2 February 2002	KBS
KBS joy	1 November 2006	KBS
KBS Kids	5 May 2012	KBS
KBS LIFE	27 February 2002	KBS
KBS N SPORTS	2 February 2002	KBS
KBS Story	1 April 2021	KBS
KETV	27 October 1999	The Korea Economic Daily
Kids Talk Talk Plus	31 March 2003	KT ENA
Korea TV	1 March 1995	
KT Alpha Shopping	23 August 2012	KT
Lifetime (Korea)	22 September 2017	iHQ, A+E
Lotte Home Shopping	15 September 2001	Lotte Corporation
Maeil Business TV	1 April 2012	MBN
MBC Drama	2 April 2001	MBC
MBC every1	1 January 2003	MBC
MBC M	1 February 2012	MBC
MBC ON	18 February 2019	MBC
MBC Sports+	2 April 2001	MBC
MBN	6 December 1994	MBN
MBN Plus	27 April 2016	MBN
Mnet	1 March 1995	CJ
MTN	1 October 2008	Money Today
MX	1 November 2022	t.cast
OCN	1 March 1995	CJ
OCN Movies	1 March 1995	CJ
OCN Movies 2	1 October 2022	CJ
OGN	24 July 2000	OP.GG
OLIFE	14 September 2020	KT ENA
ONCE	16 March 2020	KT ENA
ONT	15 December 2010	KT ENA
PAX Economy TV	January, 2010	
Pinkfong TV	16 June 2020	The Pinkfong Company
SBS Biz	1 May 2002	SBS
SBS funE	16 August 2005	SBS
SBS Golf	1 June 1999	SBS
SBS Golf 2	1 April 2023	SBS
SBS Life	2 December 2024	SBS
SBS NEX	1 August 2016	SBS
SBS Plus	1 September 2000	SBS
SBS Sports	1 March 1995	SBS
SCREEN	1 February 2009	t.cast
SENTV	10 October 2008	
SK Shopping	6 January 2015	SK Broadband
SkyUHD	2 June 2014	KT ENA
SPOTV	1 May 2010	Eclat
SPOTV2	1 January 2012	Eclat
SPOTV Golf+	6 May 2020	Eclat
SPOTV Plus	16 March 2020	Eclat
SPOTV Prime	3 March 2017	Eclat
Tomato TV	1 October 2002	
Tooniverse	1 December 1995	CJ
TV CHOSUN	1 December 2011	CHOSUN
TV CHOSUN2	12 February 2007	CHOSUN
TV CHOSUN3	1 April 2021	CHOSUN
tvN	9 October 2006	CJ
tvN DRAMA	10 September 2015	CJ
tvN STORY	1 June 2000	CJ
tvN SHOW	1 September 2021	CJ
tvN SPORTS	20 May 2022	CJ
UXN	1 June 2015	CJ
Yonhap News TV	1 December 2011	Yonhap News
Yonhap News Economy TV	15 August 2022	Yonhap News
Yonhap News TV Job	15 April 2024	Yonhap News
YTN	1 March 1995	YTN
YTN2	1 July 2011	YTN
YTN Science	8 November 2010	YTN

== International channels ==
- Arirang TV
- KBS World

== Most viewed channels ==
Position	Channel	Share of total viewing (%)
1	KBS 1TV	9.1
2	KBS 2TV	9.2
3	MBC TV	8.8
4	SBS TV	6.0
5	KBS Drama	4.9
6	OBS	4.4
7	tvN	3.9
8	MBC Drama	3.1
9	KBS News 24	2.7
10	MBC News Now	2.8
11	Mnet	1.9
12	EBS 1TV	1.4
13	EBS 2TV	0.9

== Station idents ==
Station idents, or station IDs, are short videos that are broadcast before a show starts. It mostly features historical places or tourist attractions, in some cases the stations headquarters. It is popular in South Korea.

Most feature animations of the logo, plus with a logo song. Advertisements are in the bottom in a small rectangle.

The logo song is also used for "up next" videos.

An example of an ID broadcast by KBS2 in 1995.

== See also ==
- Outline of South Korea
- List of South Korean television series
- Television in North Korea
