= SBS TV =

South Korean television channel

- Country: South Korea
- Broadcast area: South Korea and Worldwide
- Network: Seoul Broadcasting System
- Headquarters: 161, Mokdongseo-ro, Yangcheon District, Seoul

Programming
- Language: Korean
- Picture format: 2160p UHDTV (downscaled to 1080p/1080i for the HDTV feed)

Ownership
- Owner: Seoul Broadcasting System

History
- Launched: 9 December 1991; 34 years ago

Links
- Website: tv.sbs.co.kr

Availability

Terrestrial
- Digital terrestrial television: Channel 6.1 (HD)

Streaming media
- SBS Play: Program

SBS TV (Seoul Broadcasting System Television) is a South Korean free-to-air television channel operated by Seoul Broadcasting System. The channel was launched on 9 December 1991. Unlike competing network MBC, SBS operates using a federalized structure, managing a network of nine stations (of which SBS in Seoul is the flagship) to supply programming, while the affiliates outside Seoul carry local programming to cater to local needs.

== History ==
SBS TV is South Korea's second commercial television station after MBC TV, MBC News Now and was established on 9 December 1991.

In June 1990, following a ten-year hiatus due to the effects of the shutdown of the Tongyang Broadcasting Company due to the effects of a massive press merger, the Korean government started granting television licenses to the private sector again. At the time, NHK's satellite channel NHK BS1 was easily available in Korea by owners of satellite dishes, and this raised concerns over the trauma of Korea under Japanese rule, which ended in 1945. Such a measure would create a counterweight to a potential Japanese satellite invasion. Later that year, while SBS was setting up its radio station, there were concerns over its connections to Taeyoung Construction, which the Hankook Ilbo called "the Scandal of the Sixth Republic".

On 19 September 1991, it was defined that SBS would air its main news bulletin at 8pm. It was interpreted as an attempt to compete against the "frontal confrontation" between KBS News 9 and MBC Newsdesk, which occupied the 9pm timeslot. Ahead of launch, there was a spike in the demand for all-channel VHF receivers, as none of the pre-existing television channels in Seoul broadcast on Band I (SBS was channel 6, KBS2 was channel 7, KBS1, channel 9, MBC, channel 11 and EBS, channel 13). Ahead of its launch, such antennas saw a ten-fold increase in sales.

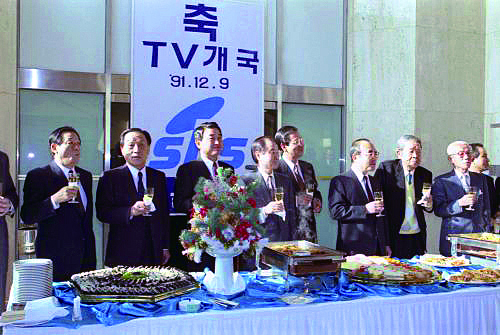
Opening ceremony of SBS TV on 9 December 1991

SBS commenced its official broadcasts in Seoul at 10:00am on 9 December, which would be designated as "The Day of Birth of SBS", a ten-hour special program; its launch was also reported by MBC Newsdesk. On the same day, SBS Eight O'Clock News was launched as the network's newscast. With the channel's launch, Korean media had finally entered the mixed public-private system. The coverage area at launch included all of Seoul, Gyeonggi and Gangwon and North Chungcheong, with approximately 47% of families receiving the channel.

On 23 March 1992, SBS reorganized its schedule with SBS News Show being converted to a weekend edition due to low ratings. It also added an hour of children's programming between 5 and 6pm, as SBS had been criticized for not airing programming for these targets.

Initially, SBS were only broadcasting terrestrially in Seoul and its surrounding areas. On 9 October 1992, the government began accepting applications for private broadcasting stations in other regions of the country. SBS had planned for a television and radio broadcast affiliate network to air SBS' programs on other new regional channels before its 5th anniversary. In 1994, the private channels KNN in Busan, TJB in Daejeon, TBC in Daegu, and kbc in Gwangju were created after government approval. On 14 May 1995, SBS launched a national television network with these channels as its local affiliates, airing SBS programs as well as creating local programming. The week of the first anniversary of the opening of the new stations was marked by SBS as "Private TV Week" in May 1996.

The network in 1997 was experiencing a drop in dramas. In September, it announced that it would start hiring freelance producers to revive its production, which was seen with internal opposition. After the IMF intervention on the Korean economy, most of its freelancers founded their own companies.

On 26 October 2001, SBS started high definition broadcasts, becoming the first terrestrial broadcaster in South Korea to do so. On that day, a special ceremony was held at the Yeouido facilities, with the presidents of the major electronics companies taking part. On 20 August 2011 at 5:30pm, SBS started broadcasting entirely in HD, over a year before its analog signal was switched off. It was the fastest of the three main networks to make the conversion.

In recent years, the rise of original programming on cable networks and later streaming services has caused the terrestrial networks to decrease their audience share, among them, SBS. While in 2000, SBS was the fourth most-watched channel, regardless or not of cable, starting in 2017, the network began surpassing MBC, the historical leader, in ratings, ending in third place, behind the KBS networks, during primetime hours. It had previously led the rankings in 2005, 2006, 2009 and 2010, in the latter's case, influenced by its exclusive rights to the 2010 FIFA World Cup. As of 2018, SBS had the best ratings in the 20-49 demographic.

== SBS network ==
The SBS network consists of ten television stations:

Channel	Corporate name	Broadcast region	Since
SBS	Seoul Broadcasting System	Seoul	9 December 1991
KNN	Korea New Network	Busan and South Gyeongsang	14 May 1995
TBC	Taegu Broadcasting Corporation	Daegu and North Gyeongsang	14 May 1995
kbc	Kwangju Broadcasting Corporation	Gwangju and South Jeolla	14 May 1995
TJB	Taejon Broadcasting	Daejeon, Sejong and South Chungcheong	14 May 1995
ubc	Ulsan Broadcasting Corporation	Ulsan	1 September 1997
JTV	Jeonju Television	Jeonbuk	17 September 1997
CJB	Cheongju Broadcasting	North Chungcheong	18 October 1997
G1	Gangwon No.1 Broadcasting	Gangwon	15 December 2001
JIBS	Jeju Free International City Broadcasting System	Jeju Island	31 May 2002

== See also ==
- SBS Love FM
- SBS Newstech
- MBN
