= Knowre =

Knowre is an education technology company founded in Seoul and headquartered in New York City.

== Pilot Program ==
Knowre launched a nationwide campaign with schools to pilot its online adaptive math program for Pre-Algebra and Algebra I in 2013.

== History ==
Knowre was founded in 2008 in the Gangnam district of Seoul, South Korea, as an offshoot of a private math academy.

In January 2013, the company received a $1.4 million investment from SoftBank Ventures Korea. A month later, KnowRe launched an open beta of its platform in the United States and now markets its product directly to K-12 schools.

In August 2013, Knowre launched a nationwide pilot program across 34 cities and 17 states in the United States and Canada. The launch included product updates such as a new Pre-Algebra curriculum, a Teacher’s Dashboard available exclusively to pilot schools, and gamified features like quests and achievement systems.

== Awards and recognition ==
In 2012, Knowre was awarded the grand prize at Global K-Startup, a competition sponsored by Google, the Korean Internet & Security Agency, and the Korea Communications Commission. Knowre was called one of four “South Korean Startups to Watch.”

In May 2013, Knowre won first place in the GapApp Challenge sponsored by the New York City Department of Education.

In 2014, Knowre opened its headquarters in New York and launched an app version for the United States.
