= Kim Hyun-woo (reporter) =

South Korean anchor and reporter

- Born: 14 August 1979 (age 46); Seoul, South Korea
- Education: Hankuk University of Foreign Studies
- Occupations: Anchor, reporter
- Years active: 2005–present
- Spouse: Lee Yeon-jin (m. 2019)
- Children: 1

- Kim Hyun-woo
- Hangul: 김현우
- Hanja: 金賢宇
- RR: Gim Hyeonu
- MR: Kim Hyŏnu

Kim Hyun-woo (born 14 August 1979) is a South Korean journalist. He is a SBS reporter and SBS Eight O'Clock News's main weekday anchor, a positioned he served from 22 May 2017 to 18 July 2025.

He was considered the youngest main news anchor among South Korean terrestrial broadcasters until Cho Hyun-yong, born in 1982 (three years longer than Kim) becoming the anchor of MBC Newsdesk on 20 May 2024.

== Biography ==
Kim Hyun-woo studied Japanese studies at Hankuk University of Foreign Studies after graduating from high school.

He joined SBS as a reporter in 2005 and assumed various posts in the division since. He became SBS' political reporter in 2016 after becoming its economics reporter in 2013.

== Personal life ==
He is married to fellow SBS announcer, Lee Yeo-jin on 15 December 2019, at a hotel in Seoul. The couple welcomed their first child together, a son, on 22 August 2020.

== Career ==
=== As reporter ===
- 2005–2008 : SBS Social division reporter
- 2008–2012 : SBS Sports division reporter
- 2013–2016 : SBS Economic reporter
- 2016–present: SBS Political reporter

=== As news anchor ===
- 2012–2014: Morning Wide weekend anchor
- 2014–16 December 2016: Morning Wide main weekday anchor
- 19 December 2016 – 21 May 2017: SBS 8 News weekend anchor
- 22 May 2017–18 July 2025: SBS 8 News weekday anchor
