= Gangwon =

Gangwon, Kangwŏn, or Kangwon (Korean: 강원) may refer to:

- Kangwon Province (pre-1910), the Goryeo, Joseon Dynasty and the Japanese Korean province
- Gangwon Province, South Korea, a province of South Korea, with its capital at Chuncheon. Before the division of Korea in 1945, Gangwon and its North Korean neighbour Kangwŏn formed a single province
- Kangwon Province, North Korea, a province of North Korea, with its capital at Wŏnsan. Before the division of Korea in 1945, Kangwŏn Province and its South Korean neighbour Gangwon Province (also spelled Kangwon Province) formed a single province that excluded Wŏnsan
- Gangwon FC, a South Korean football club. Based in Gangwon Province of South Korea, Gangwon FC joined the K League as its 15th club for the 2009 season
- Gangwon No.1 Broadcasting, a radio and television broadcaster in Gangwon Province, South Korea
