= Munhwa Broadcasting Corporation =

South Korean broadcasting company

Munhwa Broadcasting Corporation (MBC)

- MBC headquarters in Sangam-dong, Mapo District, Seoul
- Type: Public broadcasting company
- Traded as: KRX: 052220
- Industry: Broadcast radio and television
- Founded: 21 February 1961; 65 years ago
- Headquarters: 267, Sangam-dong, Mapo District, Seoul, South Korea
- Area served: South Korea; United States (satellite, certain metropolitan areas over-the-air)
- Key people: Lee Seong-ju (President and CEO)
- Revenue: 849 billion won (2022)
- Operating income: 59,272,035,738 won (2015)
- Net income: 82,403,520,805 won (2015)
- Total assets: 2,557,227,645,206 won (December 2015)
- Total equity: 1,000,000,000 won (December 2015)
- Owner: Government of South Korea through The Foundation of Broadcast Culture: (70%) Chungsoo Scholarship Foundation: (30%)
- Number of employees: 1,712 (December 2015)
- Subsidiaries: MBC Plus; MBC C&I; iMBC; MBC Arts; MBC Play Fee; MBC Academy; MBC America

Korean name
- Hangul: 문화방송
- Hanja: 文化放送
- RR: Munhwa bangsong
- MR: Munhwa pangsong
- Website: iMBC.com

Munhwa Broadcasting Corporation (MBC; Korean: 문화방송; lit. 'Cultural Broadcasting Corporation') is one of the leading South Korean television and radio broadcasters. Its flagship terrestrial television station MBC TV broadcasts as channel 11, while MBC News Now broadcasts as channel 12.

Established on 2 December 1961, MBC's terrestrial operations have a nationwide network of 17 regional stations. Although financed by advertising, MBC is classified as a public broadcaster, as its largest shareholder is a public organization, the Foundation of Broadcast Culture. MBC is a multimedia group with one terrestrial TV channel, three radio channels, five cable channels, five satellite channels and four DMB channels.

Headquartered in Digital Media City (DMC), Mapo District, Seoul, MBC has the largest broadcast production facilities in Korea, including a digital production centre, Dream Center, in Ilsan, indoor and outdoor sets in Yongin Daejanggeum Park.

== History ==
=== Radio era (1961–1968) ===
Broadcasting from Seoul (call sign: HLKV, frequency: 900 kHz, output: 10 kW), MBC started as the first non-governmental commercial broadcaster in Korea. On 12 April 1963, it obtained a license from the government for operating regional stations in major cities (Daegu, Gwangju, Daejeon, Jeonju) in Korea and established a broadcast network which connects six cities including Seoul and Busan.

=== Black and white TV era (1969–1979) ===
MBC launched TV broadcasting on 8 August 1969 (call sign: HLAC-TV, output: 2 kW), and started to broadcast its main news program, MBC Newsdesk, on 5 October 1970. It reached an affiliation deal with 7 commercial stations (in Ulsan, Jinju, Gangnueng, Chuncheon, Mokpo, Jeju, Masan) between 1968 and 1969, and started nationwide TV broadcasting through its 13 affiliated or regional stations. In 1974, FM radio was launched, and MBC took over Kyunghyang Shinmun, a daily newspaper.

=== Colour TV era (1980–1989) ===
On 11 December 1980, the Korean Broadcasting System acquired 65% of the shares. The first colour TV broadcast was started on 22 December 1980. MBC was separated from the Kyunghyang Shinmun newspaper due to the 1981 Basic Press Act. In 1982, MBC moved into the Yeouido headquarters. That same year, the network founded its baseball team, MBC Cheong-ryong (Blue Dragon), which entered the KBO League as a charter team, in addition to the network being the first home of the league's TV broadcasts. With the live coverage of the 1986 Seoul Asian Games and the 1988 Seoul Olympic Games, MBC made a great advancement in scale and technology.

Ownership of the Blue Dragon baseball team was passed to LG Corporation in 1989.

=== Multimedia era (1990–1999) ===
After rapidly growing into a large corporation covering major international events, MBC established specialized companies for each value chain (MBC Production, MBC Media Tech, MBC Broadcast Culture Center, MBC Arts Company, MBC Arts Center) and spun them off as subsidiaries to become a more efficient corporation amid fiercer competition in the multimedia era. MBC Production and MBC Media Tech were merged into MBC C&I in August 2011.

=== Digital era (2000–present) ===
In 2000, MBC made its subsidiary iMBC (internet MBC) an independent corporation to pursue various internet-related business. Furthermore, it started cable TV (MBC Plus Media,) satellite TV, new DMB broadcasting and full daytime broadcasting on terrestrial television. In 2007, MBC established Ilsan Dream Center, a digital production centre. In September 2014, it completed the construction of a new headquarters building and moved from Yeouido to Sangam-dong.

In 2001, MBC launched satellite and cable television broadcasting. As part of this expansion, it created MBC America, a subsidiary based in Los Angeles, United States, to distribute its programming throughout the Americas. On 1 August 2008, MBC America launched MBC-D, a television network carried on the digital subchannels of KSCI-TV, KTSF-TV, and WMBC-TV. The service was planned to be launched in Atlanta, Chicago, and Washington, D.C. by the end of the year. In northeast metro Atlanta, it aired on WKTB-CD channel 47.3 (now a Telemundo affiliate), but as of 2011 is on WSKC-CD channel 22.1.

In March 2013, computer shutdowns hit South Korean television stations, including MBC. The South Korean government asserted a North Korean link in the March cyberattacks, which has been denied by Pyongyang.

During the opening of the 2020 Summer Olympics in Tokyo, Japan, MBC accidentally depicted stereotypes about specific countries like Italy for pizzas.

== International relations ==
MBC is an active member of international organizations such as ABU (Asia-Pacific Broadcasting Union), IATAS (International Academy of Television Arts & Science) and INPUT (International Public Television Screening Conference), and is affiliated with 21 broadcasters in 13 countries.

It is engaged in various global businesses through subsidiaries in Los Angeles and Shanghai, and bureaus in North America, Latin America, Europe, the Middle East, as well as Asia, in close cooperation with major global media groups.

It maintains a close relationship with foreign buyers by participating in major content markets every year, such as MIP-TV, MIPCOM, NATPE, BCWW and ATF. It also operates an English website that introduces MBC content to overseas buyers and viewers.

MBC drama What on Earth Is Love? was the first Korean Wave drama, sparking the K-drama boom across China when it was aired on CCTV in 1997. Since then, numerous MBC dramas, entertainment shows, and documentaries have been exported to different countries. The drama Dae Jang Geum was shown in as many as 91 countries around the world. More recently, MBC has been widening its content business by exporting show formats such as I Am a Singer, We Got Married and Dad! Where Are We Going?.

== CEOs ==
Term	Name	Period	Background
1st to 3rd	Kim Ji-tae	21 February 1961 – 22 July 1962	
4th	Go Won-jeung	22 July 1962 – 26 August 1964	
5th	Hwang Yong-ju	26 August 1964 – 15 December 1964	
6th to 8th	Jo Jeung-chul	15 December 1964 – 30 June 1971	
9th to 12th	Lee Hwan-ui	30 June 1971 – 20 June 1980	
Acting	Im Taek-geun	20 June 1980 – 5 July 1980	
13th	Lee Jin-hee	5 July 1980 – 7 June 1982	Reporter
14th to 15th	Lee Woong-hee	7 June 1982 – 17 February 1986	Reporter
16th	Hwang Seon-pil	17 February 1986 – 29 August 1988	
Acting	Shin Jeong-hyu	29 August 1988 – 2 November 1988	
17th	Kim Young-su	2 November 1988 – 10 February 1989	
18th to 19th	Choi Chang-bong	10 February 1989 – 12 March 1993	Producer
20th to 21st	Kang Seong-gu	17 March 1993 – 14 June 1996	Reporter
Acting	Pyeon Il-pyeong	14 June 1996 – 22 July 1996	
22nd	Lee Deuk-ryeol	22 July 1996 – 8 March 1999	Reporter
23rd	No Seong-dae	9 March 1999 – 9 March 2001	Reporter
24th to 25th	Kim Joong-bae	9 March 2001 – 2 March 2003	Reporter
26th	Lee Geung-hee	3 March 2003 – 25 February 2005	Producer
27th	Choi Moon-soon	25 February 2005 – 28 February 2008	Reporter
28th	Eom Gi-young	29 February 2008 – 8 February 2010	Reporter
29th 30th	Kim Jae-chul	26 February 2010 – 26 March 2013	Reporter
Acting	Ahn Gwang-han	26 March 2013 – 3 May 2013	
31st	Kim Jong-guk	3 May 2013 – 24 February 2014	Reporter
32nd	Ahn Gwang-han	25 February 2014 – 24 February 2017	Producer
33rd	Kim Jang-gyeom	25 February 2017 – 13 November 2017	Reporter
Acting	Choi Ki-hwa	14 November 2017 – 7 December 2017	
34th	Choi Seung-ho	7 December 2017 – 23 February 2020	Producer
35th	Park Seong-je	24 February 2020 – 23 February 2023	Reporter
36th	Ahn Hyung-joon	24 February 2023 – 14 September 2026	Reporter
37th	Lee Seong-ju (Note: Lee become the first MBC President and CEO who was selected using the new mechanism under the revised South Korean Broadcasting Act, which involved participation from Citizens' Presidential Candidate Recommendation Committee, composed of 150 people.)	14 September 2026 – present	Managing Director of iMBC

== Channels ==
- One terrestrial TV (MBC TV—channel 11ㆍMBC News Now—channel 12)
- Three radio stations:

Name	Frequency	Power (kW)
MBC Standard FM	95.9 MHz FM	/>10 kW (FM)
MBC FM4U	91.9 MHz FM	10 kW
Channel M	CH 12A DAB	2 kW

- Five cable/satellite (MBC Drama, MBC Sports+, MBC M, MBC every1 and MBC ON)
- Three terrestrial DMB (TV, radio, data)
- Two satellite DMB (MBC Drama, MBC Sports+)
- MBC Voice Acting Division (Korean: 문화방송 성우극회), a voice acting company known for its work on movies, anime, documentaries, among other media.

== Logos ==
First logo (used 1961 to 1969)

Second MBC logo (used 1969 to November 1981)

Third MBC logo (1974 to November 1981)

Fourth MBC logo (used April 1980 to November 1981)

Fifth MBC logo (December 1981 to 1985)

First variant of sixth MBC logo (1 January to 30 April 1986)

Second variant of sixth MBC logo (1 May 1986 to 2 January 2005)

Seventh MBC logo (3 January 2005 to 31 December 2011)

Eighth MBC logo (1 January 2012 to 5 April 2023)

Ninth MBC logo and current MBC logo (used since 6 April 2023)

== Flag ==
2005–2012

2012–present

== Headquarters ==
Current MBC headquarters located in Sangam-dong (4 August 2014 – present).

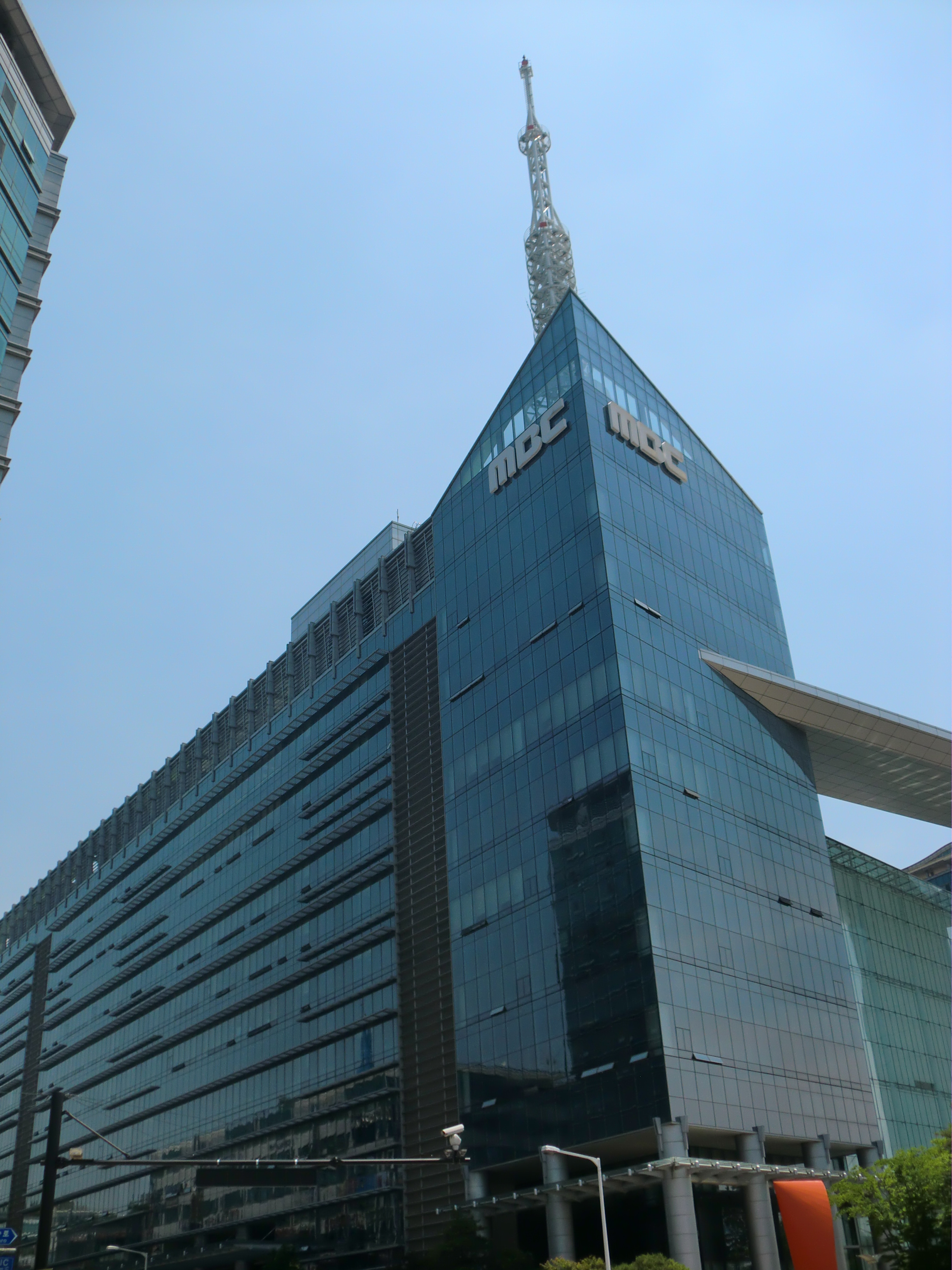
MBC Dream Center located in Goyang, Gyeonggi Province (30 November 2007 – present).

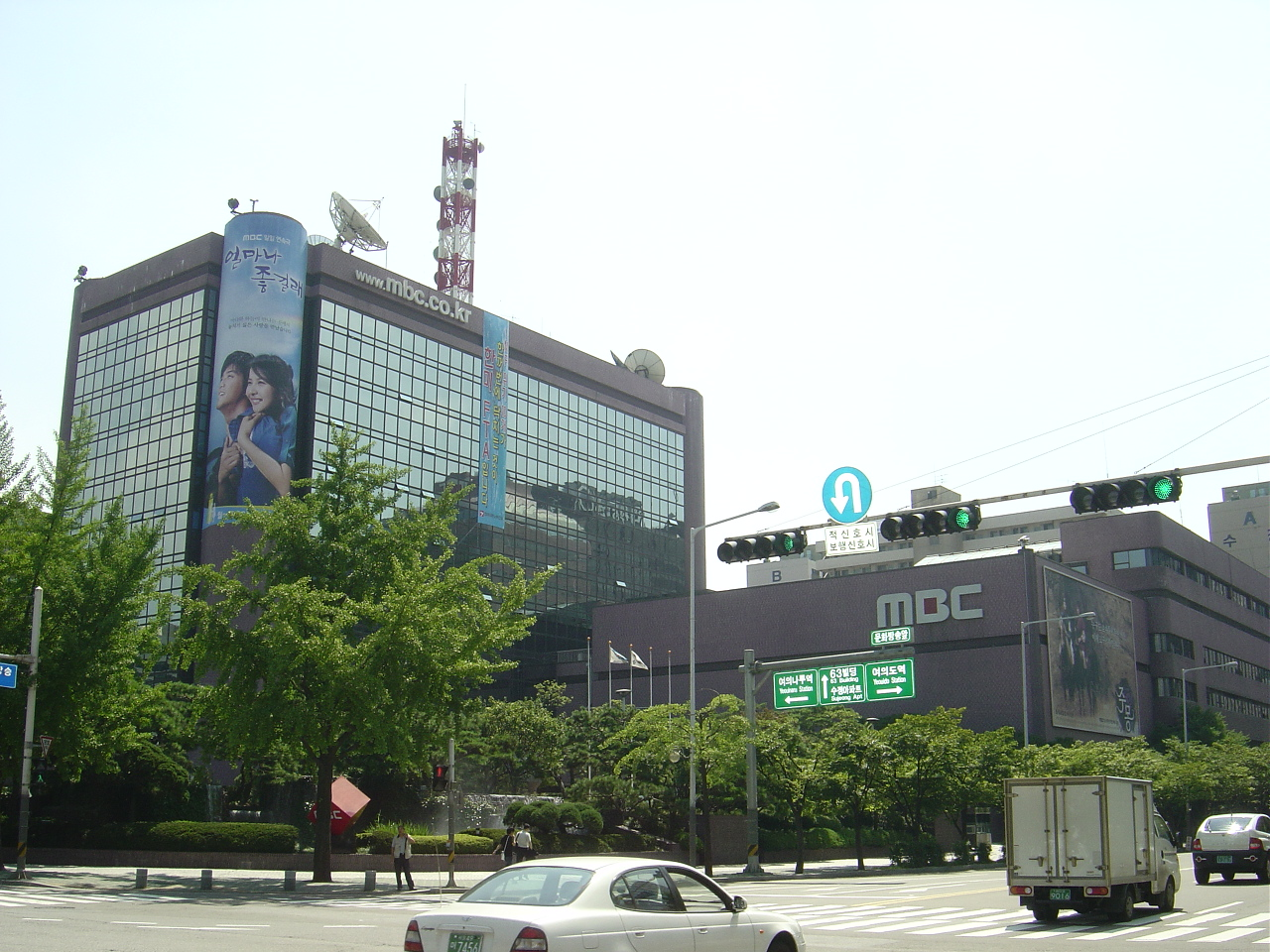
Old MBC headquarters located in Yeouido (17 February 1982 – 3 August 2014).

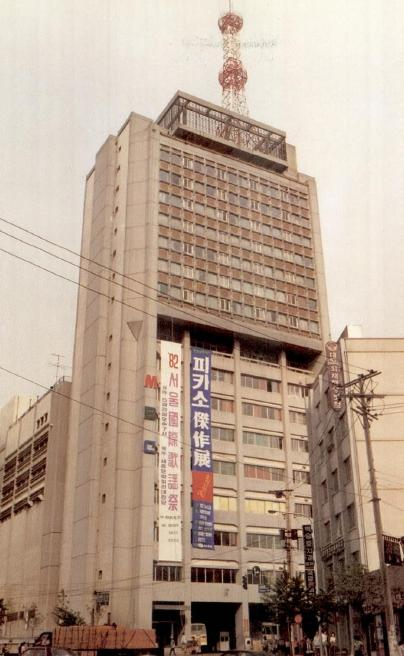
Old MBC building located in Jeong-dong (8 August 1969 – 16 February 1982; now used by Kyunghyang Shinmun).

== See also ==
- List of programs broadcast by Munhwa Broadcasting Corporation
- Korean Broadcasting System
- Seoul Broadcasting System
- Educational Broadcasting System
- List of South Korean broadcasting networks
- Contemporary culture of South Korea
