= KBS News 24 =

South Korean public television news channel

- Country: South Korea
- Broadcast area: National; International (via YouTube)
- Network: Korean Broadcasting System

Programming
- Language: Korean
- Picture format: 2160p UHDTV (downscaled to 1080i and 480i for the HDTV and SDTV feeds respectively)

Ownership
- Owner: Korean Broadcasting System
- Sister channels: KBS1; KBS2

History
- Launched: 3 March 2010; 16 years ago
- Former names: KBS24 (2010–2021); KBS News D (2021–2025)

Availability

Terrestrial
- Digital terrestrial television: Channel 9.2

Streaming media
- KBS: Watch live (South Korea only)

KBS News 24 is an over-the-air news channel owned by the Korean Broadcasting System (KBS). The channel broadcasts on KBS1 and KBS2's multiplex.

== History ==
The origin of the channel lies on a 2007 plan by KBS to launch a dedicated news channel on digital terrestrial television, using the KBS1 multiplex. The goal was to launch the channel in 2010, though tests would begin in December 2007 to provide information during snowstorms, and in 2008, its tests would increase to a nine-hour schedule. However, in October, KOBACO revised the plan to introduce such a service, granted that the rights to operate the channel were licensed to the relevant multiplex.

On 3 March 2010, KBS launched KBS 24 News as a web channel, on the 37th anniversary of KBS's conversion to a public service broadcaster. There was already the possibility of launching the channel on digital terrestrial television at a later date. In June 2020, KBS announced the channel's conversion into an OTT service effective 1 September. The aim was to reach out to users who don't regularly watch television and depend largely on the internet.

In August 2021, KOBACO suggested the creation of a terrestrial news channel (channel 9.2 using the KBS1 multiplex) to disseminate disaster information nationwide to viewers without access to cable television. As of December 2021, KBS News D was conducting a daily 90-minute test broadcast (KBS News D-live). KBS compared the new channel to Fox Weather and Weathernews Inc., which have dedicated teams in case of natural disasters. KOBACO received KBS's proposal on 31 August 2021.

== See also ==
- EBS1
- EBS2
- KBS1
- KBS2
