= Lee Yeo-jin =

South Korean announcer

- Born: 3 November 1987 (age 38); Seoul, South Korea
- Education: Seoul Women's University
- Occupations: Television personality, Announcer
- Years active: 2012-present
- Spouse: Kim Hyun-woo (m. 2019)
- Children: 1

- Lee Yeo-jin
- Hangul: 이여진
- Hanja: 李汝眞
- RR: I Yeojin
- MR: I Yŏjin

Lee Yeo-jin (born 3 November 1987) is a South Korean announcer and SBS 8 News's weather caster. She was also a former student at Seoul Women's University, Seoul, South Korea.

She is currently married to fellow SBS anchor and reporter, Kim Hyun-woo since 15 December 2019. They welcomed their first child together, a son, on 22 August 2020.
