= Taegu Broadcasting Corporation =

Taegu Broadcasting Corporation (HLDE-DTV)

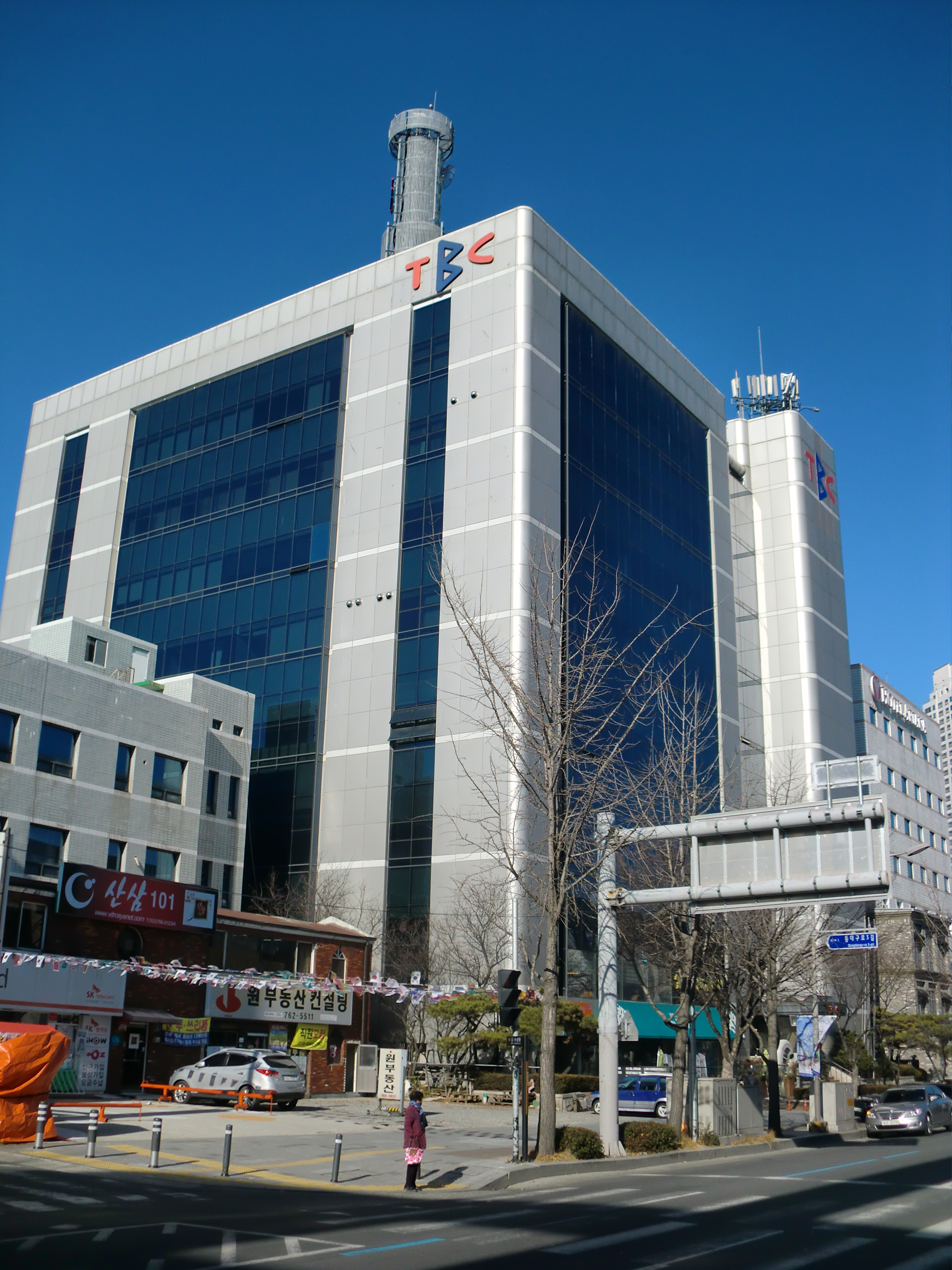
- North Gyeongsang Province; South Korea
- City: Daegu
- Channels: Digital: 15 (UHF); Virtual: 6
- Branding: Taegu Broadcasting Corporation; TBC (大邱放送); TBC Television

Programming
- Affiliations: SBS

History
- First air date: August 10, 1994 (demo broadcast); October 7, 1994 (test broadcast); May 14, 1995 (official broadcast)
- Call sign meaning: Last two letters for Daegu

Technical information
- Licensing authority: KCC

Links
- Website: www.tbc.co.kr

The Taegu Broadcasting Corporation (Hangul: 대구 방송; KRX: 033830) is a regional television and radio broadcasting company that is based in Daegu (Taegu), South Korea, and are eventually broadcasting as an affiliate of Seoul Broadcasting System (SBS). The station were originally established on August 10, 1994, and had first started its demo emissions, although it were later beginning its test transmissions on October 7, 1994, and then, it had officially commenced its official broadcasts on May 14, 1995. FM broadcasts started in 1997.

== History ==
FM broadcasts started in 1997.

The station had a reporting office in Andong which opened on May 1, 1995, with two full-time reporters, but due to deteriorating management conditions, it closed on April 30, 1998.

A documentary aired by TBC's radio station about three centenarians in the Daegu area, which was broadcast in December 1999 was the first Korean production to be awarded at the New York Festival in May 2000. TBC shot a documentary in Sivakasi, Tamil Nadu in 2007, Tragedy Buried in Happiness, in association with several Indian and international NGOs. The documentary profiled three children who were hurt by fire-based body damage during Diwali.

On August 27, 2010, it and three other companies (IC Korea, DK Lock, Anapass) had joined the preliminary sorting for being listed on KOSDAQ.

== Stations ==
HLDE-FM
- South Korea
- Broadcast area: Daegu, North Gyeongsang Province, South Korea
- Frequencies: FM 99.3 MHz (Daegu, Gyeongju, Gumi); FM 99.7 MHz (Pohang, Yeongdeok, Uljin); FM 106.5 MHz (Andong, Yeongju, Seongseo, Jisan, Beommul)
- Branding: TBC Dream FM

Programming
- Language: Korean
- Format: Top 40 Mainstream/K-Pop
- Affiliations: SBS Power FM

Ownership
- Owner: Taegu Broadcasting Corporation

History
- First air date: March 1, 1997 (Daegu, Gyeongju, Gumi); March 1, 2001 (Pohang, Yeongdeok, Uljin); December 1, 2008 (Andong, Yeongju); May 10, 2015 (Seongseo, Jisan, Beommul)

Technical information
- Licensing authority: KCC
- Class: all
- Power: 5kW (Daegu, Gyeongju, Gumi); 1kW (Pohang, Yeongdeok, Uljin); 500W (Andong, Yeongju); 20W (Seongseo, Jisan, Beommul)

HLDE-UHDTV
ATSC 3.0 station
- North Gyeongsang Province; South Korea
- City: Yeongcheon
- Channels: Digital: 53 (UHF); Virtual: 6
- Branding: TBC UHD

Programming
- Subchannels: 6.1: 2160p UHDTV simulcast of HLDE-DTV
- Affiliations: SBS

History
- First air date: December 29, 2017

Technical information
- Licensing authority: KCC
- Class: ATSC 3.0 experimental
- Power: 5 kilowatts

- Television
  - Channel – Ch. 15 (LCN 6-1)
  - Launched – May 14, 1995
  - Call Sign – HLDE-DTV
- FM radio (Dream FM)
  - Frequency – 99.3 MHz (Daegu, Gyeongju, Gumi), 99.7 MHz (Pohang, Yeongdeok, Uljin), 106.5 MHz (Andong, Yeongju, Seongseo, Jisan, Beommul)
  - Launched – December 1, 1997
  - Call Sign – HLDE-FM

== Tie-up stations ==
- Hiroshima Home Television (Hiroshima, Japan; since May 2, 1997, under sister city agreement)
- China Central Television (ince June 19, 1995)
- Asahi Broadcasting Corporation (Osaka, Japan; since 1995)
- KCOP-TV (Los Angeles, United States; since 1995)
- Shenyang Television (Shenyang, China)

== See also ==
- List of South Korean broadcasting networks
- Communications in South Korea
- SBS (Korea)
