= MBC Dramanet =

- Country: South Korea
- Broadcast area: South Korea
- Headquarters: Seoul

Programming
- Language: Korean
- Picture format: 1080i HDTV

Ownership
- Owner: MBC Plus

History
- Launched: 1 March 1995
- Former names: FBS (1995); JBS (1995-1997); Dramanet (1997-2001)

Links
- Website: mbcplus.com

MBC Drama, also known as MBC Dramanet (MBC 드라마넷) is a South Korean channel owned by MBC Plus, specialized in drama programming. The channel is one of the oldest cable networks in Korea, founded in 1995 by CheilJedang, and has been under the control of MBC since 2001.

== History ==
The channel started regular broadcasts as First Broadcasting System on 1 September 1995, later changing its name to Jeil Broadcasting System on 20 October. In both cases, the Korean notation was Jeil Bangsong (제일방송). At the time of the rename to JBS, it was already showing one original production, Seontaek! Video Box, a program about news in the home video market. At the end of 1996, the channel became one of many to suffer from, what the Maeil Business Newspaper reported as, "the elephant in the room", referring to the downfall of certain channels. JBS stopped broadcasting entertainment programming and started airing Samgu Shopping's home shopping service, as a means of restructuring.

On 19 May 1997, CJ Group renamed the channel as Dramanet, becoming a drama channel, airing Korean (including productions from future owner MBC) and foreign productions, with titles at launch including miniseries such as Op Center and The Langoliers.

On 26 March 2001, MBC Plus acquired two channels from CJ, Dramanet and fashion channel LOOK TV. MBC agreed CJ's proposal to acquire 46,9% in Dramanet's shares and an additional 18,6% within a year. Subsequently the company name changed to MBC Dramanet. In 2001 alone, it had shown its compliance with Korean laws airing a minimum of 30% local films.

On 10 April 2020, the channel started airing reruns of Find Me in Your Memory on a delay of a few weeks from the terrestrial MBC channel. On 28 August, it premiered the third season of Chinese drama series The Love Equations, to promote Sino-Korean cultural exchange.
