= MBC Newsdesk =

- Logo used since July 16, 2018
- Genre: News program
- Presented by: Weekdays: Cho Hyun-yong; Kim Su-ji; Weekends: Kim Kyung-ho; Kim Cho-rong
- Country of origin: South Korea
- Original language: Korean

Production
- Camera setup: Multiple-camera setup
- Running time: 95 minutes (Monday–Thursday); 60 minutes (Friday); 50 minutes (Saturday); 30 minutes (Sunday and holidays)
- Production company: MBC News

Original release
- Network: MBC TV
- Release: October 5, 1970 – present

MBC Newsdesk is a South Korean television news broadcasting show broadcast by MBC. It aired from October 5, 1970 to present. The newscast aired at 7:40 pm KST on Weekdays and 7:55 pm KST on Weekends. Jo Hyun-yong and Kim Su-ji serves as the currently anchors for weekdays and Kim Kyung-ho and Kim Cho-rong serves as the currently anchors for weekdays.

== History ==
Former titlecard used from June 29, 2020 to June 25, 2023

The newscast premiered on October 5, 1970, as MBC 뉴우스데스크 due to the orthography at the time. It was then renamed MBC News Scene (MBC 뉴스의 現場) on 1976 before reverting to its original title in 1980, this time as MBC 뉴스데스크.

Broadcast times

Year	Date	Broadcast	Airtime	Title	Notes
1970	October 5	weekdays	22:30-22:55	MBC Newsdesk (MBC 뉴우스데스크)	First broadcast with the current title; also first flagship newscast by a public broadcaster
1971	February 7	weekdays	22:00-22:30	MBC Newsdesk (MBC 뉴우스데스크)	timeslot change
1971	March 1	weekdays	22:00-22:20	MBC Newsdesk (MBC 뉴우스데스크)	runtime extension
1971	September 2	Monday-Saturday	22:00-22:30	MBC Newsdesk (MBC 뉴우스데스크)	runtime extension
1971	October 4	weekdays	22:00-22:25	MBC Newsdesk (MBC 뉴우스데스크)	runtime extension
1972	October 30	weekdays	22:00-22:30	MBC Newsdesk (MBC 뉴우스데스크)	runtime reduction
1974	November 2	weekdays, Sundays	22:00-22:30 (weekdays) 21:40-21:55 (Sundays)	MBC Newsdesk (MBC 뉴우스데스크) (weekdays) MBC Comprehensive News (Sundays)	new standalone program on Sundays
1975	January 6	weekdays, Sundays	22:00-22:30 (weekdays) 21:35-21:55 (Sundays)	MBC Newsdesk (MBC 뉴우스데스크)	integration with Comprehensive News
1975	April 7	everyday	22:00-22:30 (weekdays) 22:05-22:55 (Saturdays) 21:35-21:55 (Sundays)	MBC Newsdesk (MBC 뉴우스데스크)	runtime extension
1975	October 13	everyday	22:00-22:30 (weekdays) 22:00-22:20 (Saturdays) 21:35-21:55 (Sundays)	MBC Newsdesk (MBC 뉴우스데스크)	timeslot change on Saturdays
1976	April 12	everyday	21:00-21:25 (weekdays, Saturdays) 21:25-21:45 (Sundays)	MBC Newsdesk (MBC 뉴우스데스크)	timeslot change on Monday-Saturday
1976	April 26	everyday	21:00-21:25 (weekdays, Saturdays) 21:25-21:45 (Sundays)	MBC News Scene	title change
1976	October 18	everyday	21:00-21:25 (weekdays) 21:30-21:50 (weekends)	MBC News Scene	timeslot change on weekends
1977	April 18	everyday	21:00-21:30 (weekdays) 21:30-21:50 (weekends)	MBC News Scene	runtime extension on weekdays
1978	October 16	everyday	21:00-21:30 (weekdays) 21:00-21:20 (weekends)	MBC News Scene	timeslot change on weekends
1980	March 3	everyday	21:00-21:35 (weekdays) 21:00-21:20 (weekends)	MBC News Scene	runtime extension on weekdays
1980	September 2	everyday	21:00-21:40 (weekdays) 21:00-21:20 (weekends)	MBC News Scene	runtime extension on weekdays
1980	December 15	everyday	21:00-21:35 (weekdays) 21:00-21:20 (weekends)	MBC Newsdesk (MBC 뉴스데스크)	return to the current title
1981	March 15	everyday	21:00-21:35 (Mondays-Saturdays) 21:00-22:00 (Sundays)	MBC Newsdesk (MBC 뉴스데스크) MBC News Center (Sundays)	new standalone program on Sundays
1981	September 30	everyday	21:00-21:40 (weekdays) 21:00-21:35 (Saturdays) 21:00-22:00 (Sundays)	MBC Newsdesk (MBC 뉴스데스크) MBC News Center (Sundays)	runtime extension on weekdays
1982	October 18	everyday	21:00-21:40 (weekdays) 21:00-21:30 (Saturdays) 21:00-22:00 (Sundays)	MBC Newsdesk (MBC 뉴스데스크) MBC News Center (Sundays)	runtime reduction on Saturdays
1984	April 10	everyday	21:00-21:40 (weekdays) 21:00-21:30 (Saturdays) 21:00-21:50 (Sundays)	MBC Newsdesk (MBC 뉴스데스크) MBC News Center (Sundays)	runtime reduction on Sundays
1984	October 22	everyday	21:00-21:40 (weekdays) 21:00-21:30 (weekends)	MBC Newsdesk (MBC 뉴스데스크)	integration with News Center
1985	March 4	everyday	21:00-21:45 (weekdays) 21:00-21:30 (weekends)	MBC Newsdesk (MBC 뉴스데스크)	runtime extension on weekdays
1987	May 4	everyday	21:00-21:50 (weekdays) 21:00-21:30 (weekends)	MBC Newsdesk (MBC 뉴스데스크)	runtime extension on weekdays
1988	May 9	everyday	21:00-21:50 (weekdays) 21:00-21:25 (weekends)	MBC Newsdesk (MBC 뉴스데스크)	runtime reduction on weekends
1989	April 24	everyday	21:00-21:45 (weekdays)	MBC Newsdesk (MBC 뉴스데스크) (Mondays-Saturdays) MBC News Center (Sundays)	new standalone program on Sundays
1989	October 30	everyday	21:00-21:40 (weekdays) 21:00-21:25 (weekends)	MBC Newsdesk (MBC 뉴스데스크)	integration with News Center
1990	April 28	everyday	21:00-21:50 (weekdays) 21:00-21:25 (weekends)	MBC Newsdesk (MBC 뉴스데스크)	runtime extension on weekdays
1991	April 21	everyday	21:00-21:50 (weekdays, Sundays) 21:00-21:25 (Saturdays)	MBC Newsdesk (MBC 뉴스데스크) (Mondays-Saturdays) MBC News Center (Sundays)	new standalone program on Sundays
1991	October 2	everyday	21:00-21:45 (weekdays) 21:00-21:30 (Saturdays) 21:00-21:50 (Sundays)	MBC Newsdesk (MBC 뉴스데스크) (Mondays-Saturdays) MBC News Center (Sundays)	runtime reduction on weekdays, extension on Saturdays
1993	May 3	everyday	21:00-21:45 (weekdays) 21:00-21:30 (Saturdays) 21:00-21:40 (Sundays)	MBC Newsdesk (MBC 뉴스데스크) (Mondays-Saturdays) MBC News Center (Sundays)	runtime reduction on Sundays
1993	October 18	everyday	21:00-21:45 (weekdays) 21:00-21:40 (weekends)	MBC Newsdesk (MBC 뉴스데스크)	integration with News Center
1994	February 21	everyday	21:00-21:45 (weekdays) 21:00-21:30 (weekends)	MBC Newsdesk (MBC 뉴스데스크)	runtime reduction on weekends
1996	January 16	everyday	21:00-21:45 (weekdays) 21:00-21:35 (weekends)	MBC Newsdesk (MBC 뉴스데스크)	runtime extension on weekdays
1996	March 5	everyday	21:00-21:45 (weekdays) 21:00-21:30 (weekends)	MBC Newsdesk (MBC 뉴스데스크)	runtime reduction on weekends
1997	January 6	everyday	21:00-21:50 (weekdays) 21:00-21:30 (weekends)	MBC Newsdesk (MBC 뉴스데스크)	runtime extension on weekdays
1998	July 20	everyday	21:00-21:50 (weekdays) 21:00-21:35 (weekends)	MBC Newsdesk (MBC 뉴스데스크)	runtime extension on weekends
1999	May 17	everyday	21:00-21:50 (weekdays) 21:00-21:40 (weekends)	MBC Newsdesk (MBC 뉴스데스크)	runtime extension on weekends
2001	February 5	everyday	21:00-21:55 (weekdays) 21:00-21:40 (weekends)	MBC Newsdesk (MBC 뉴스데스크)	runtime extension on weekdays
2005	April 25	everyday	21:00-21:55 (weekdays) 21:00-21:35 (weekends)	MBC Newsdesk (MBC 뉴스데스크)	runtime reduction on weekends
2008	May 26	everyday	21:00-21:55 (weekdays) 21:00-21:40 (weekends)	MBC Newsdesk (MBC 뉴스데스크)	runtime extension on weekends
2010	November 1	everyday	21:00-21:55 (weekdays) 20:00-20:45	MBC Newsdesk (MBC 뉴스데스크)	timeslot change on weekends
2012	November 5	everyday	20:00-20:55 (weekdays) 20:00-20:45 (weekends)	MBC Newsdesk (MBC 뉴스데스크)	timeslot change on weekdays
2017	December 8	everyday	20:00-20:35 (weekdays) 20:00-20:30 (weekends)	MBC News	reorganization period (MBC strike)
2017	December 26	everyday	20:00-20:55 (weekends) 20:00-20:35 (weekends)	MBC Newsdesk (MBC 뉴스데스크)	massive reorganization
2018	March 31	everyday	20:00-20:55 (weekdays) 20:00-20:45 (weekends)	MBC Newsdesk (MBC 뉴스데스크)	runtime reduction on weekends
2018	September 21	everyday	20:00-20:55 (Mondays-Thursdays) 20:00-20:50 (Fridays) 20:00-20:45 (weekends and holidays)	MBC Newsdesk (MBC 뉴스데스크)	runtime reduction on Fridays
2019	March 18	everyday	19:30-20:55 (Mondays-Thursdays) 19:30-20:30 (Fridays and holidays) 20:00-20:45 (weekends)	MBC Newsdesk (MBC 뉴스데스크)	massive reorganization
2020	March 25	everyday	19:35-20:55 (Mondays-Thursdays) 19:35-20:30 (Fridays and holidays) 20:00-20:45 (weekends)	MBC Newsdesk (MBC 뉴스데스크)	runtime reduction on weekdays
2020	May 31	everyday	19:35-20:55 (Mondays-Thursdays) 19:35-20:30 (Fridays and holidays) 20:00-20:45 (Saturdays) 20:00-20:25 (Sundays)	MBC Newsdesk (MBC 뉴스데스크)	runtime reduction on Sundays
2020	June 29	everyday	19:55-21:30 (Mondays-Thursdays) 19:55-20:50 (Fridays and holidays) 20:00-20:45 (Saturdays) 20:00-20:25 (Sundays)	MBC Newsdesk (MBC 뉴스데스크)	reorganization
2020	September 14	everyday	19:50-21:20 (Mondays-Thursdays) 19:50-21:45 (Fridays and holidays) 19:55-20:45 (Saturdays) 19:55-20:25 (Sundays)	MBC Newsdesk (MBC 뉴스데스크)	timeslot change on weekdays

== Segments ==
Hangul version of the logo, used since June 26, 2023

=== Current segments ===
==== Main segments ====
- News Pre-desk (뉴스프리데스크) is a YouTube-only segment established on June 29, 2020, following reorganization, where announcer Kim Min-ho and head of news strategy team Sung Ji-young brief viewers about different issues. Guests also drop by the show sometimes, including anchor Wang Jong-myung.
- Going Right Away (바로 간다) is a segment centered on investigative reporting. It is a merge of old segments Camera Dispatch, On-site Dispatch and On-site Dispatch M.
- MBC Tip-off (제보는 MBC) is a segment established on October 13, 2020, where viewers send in tips to the news department for developing stories. It was preceded by You Are the News.
- In-depth Coverage M (집중취재M) is a segment established on October 15, 2020, centered exclusively on investigative reporting.
- Site 36.5 (현장 36.5) is a segment where stories and/or interviews are aired with subtitles and background music.
- In Today's News (오늘 이 뉴스) explains stories briefly.
- Weighing Facts (팩트의 무게) is similar to JTBC Newsroom's Fact Check segment where reporter Nam Sang-ho fact-checks statements or give in-depth explanations on a certain topic.
- Omniscient Political View (정치적 참견시점) is a segment where anchor Wang Jong-myung and reporter Kim Jae-young analyze how journalists produce their stories, similar to Newsroom's Behind Plus segment, but specializing in political stories.. The title is a parody of the network's variety show Omniscient Interfering View.
- One-shot Politics (정치원샷) is a segment where the latest happenings on politics is summarized in one minute.
- Roadman (로드맨) is a Saturday-only segment where reporter Yeom Kyu-hyun goes out in the field to cover stories. He is backed up by reporter-turned-producer Kwak Seung-kyu, cameraman Kim Tae-hyo, writer Lee Mi-rim and assistant director Ryu Da-ye, with fellow reporter Nam Hyung-suk serving as the Fact Man to help viewers understand the issues being explained.
- My First Interview (내 생애 첫 인터뷰) is another weekend-only segment where anchor Kim Kyung-ho holds a camera with a selfie stick and interviews people working behind the scenes in the style of a vlog.
- MBC Sports News (MBC 스포츠뉴스) is the show's sports segment hosted by Lee Young-eun, where she details the latest in the sports world.
- MBC Weather (MBC 날씨) is the show's weather segment presented by Choi Ah-ri.

===== News Pre-desk segments =====
- Walking Through the Cue Sheet (큐시트 산책) previews how the show will go through the cue sheet provided by Noh Jae-pil, head of the Newsdesk editing team. This typically is aired last, but can be omitted when Pre-invitation is extended.
- Pre-invitation (프리 초대석) is where the hosts talk about issues with an expert.
- Old-fashioned Politics (아재정치) is a Tuesday-only segment where Hwang Oe-jin drops by to talk about political issues.
- Economic Hand (손경제) is a Thursday-only corner where announcer Lee Sun-young talks about economic issues.
- Choi Ah-ri's Painful Weather (최아리의 날씨앓이) is a Friday-only segment where weathercaster Choi Ah-ri explains issues related to the weather.

=== Former segments ===
- In Today's Newsdesk (오늘의 뉴스데스크) previews the top stories that will be covered in the show. It was abolished on March 18, 2019, following reorganization.
- Today's Stocks (오늘의 증권) is a segment where then-reporter Kwon Jae-hong delves on the latest at the stock exchange.
- Economic Trends (경제 동향) is a short segment where important economic factors are displayed, such as stocks and exchange rates. It was abolished on March 18, 2019.
- Camera Dispatch (카메라 출동) is a segment focused on investigative reporting, and was one of the show's most popular segments.
- Desk Video (데스크 영상) is a video montage appearing before presenting the weather. Songs from popular anime and games are used during this segment, such as an instrumental version of A Cruel Angel's Thesis, Tsuna Awakens from the Reborn! score and multiple themes from the MapleStory score.
- My Little Newsdesk (마이 리틀 뉴스데스크) borrows the format of variety show My Little Television where Lee Jae-eun (joined by reporter Lim Kyung-ah on Mondays, Wednesdays and Fridays; and Kim Kyung-ho on Tuesdays and Thursdays) presents different articles to viewers, who will react to it via livestream.
- Kim Soo-jin's Human Story (김수진의 스토리 人) is a short-lived segment where anchor Kim Soo-jin interviews people. Only two episodes were broadcast, one with Seoul mayor Park Won-soon and actor Ha Jung-woo.
- News Refresh (뉴스 새로고침) is a fact-checking segment hosted by Park Young-hoe, where he conducts interviews rather than putting separate reports. The title is derived from the Internet's refresh function.
- Back to the News (BACK 투 더 뉴스)
- You are the News (당신이 뉴스입니다) is a segment where viewers provide tips about stories around them. It is succeeded by MBC Tip-off.
- Minority Opinion (소수의견)

== Anchors ==
=== Weekdays ===
Main anchors

Name	Duration	Notes
Park Geun-sook 박근숙	early 1970s	On the newscast's 40th anniversary special, host Kim Yong-man introduced him as the first Korean news anchor. He anchored the program's first broadcast on October 5, 1970.
Kim Ki-joo 김기주	1970	
Kwak No-hwan 곽노환	1970	
Kim Chang-shik 김창식	1970	
Hyung Jin-han 형진한	1970	
Lee Eun-myung 이은명	1970	
Lee Young-ik 이영익	1970	
Kim Ki-do 김기도	1970	
Ha Soon-bong 하순봉	late 1970s—1980s	
Jung Byung-soo 정병수	late 1970s—1981	He also hosted Laida 11, MBC's premier current affairs program at the time.
Lee Deuk-ryul 이득렬	1974—April 30, 1987	He and Uhm Ki-young are the longest-serving anchors of the show.
Kang Sung-goo 강성구	May 1, 1987—November 4, 1988	He is most remembered for the "bug in my ear" incident that happened during his tenure.
Choo Sung-choon 추성춘	As weekend main anchor: June 3, 1989—August 26, 1989 As weekday main anchor: November 7, 1988—September 15, 1989	He was a former correspondent based in Tokyo and Paris.
Lee In-yong 이인용	November 11, 1996—October 27, 2000	He is known for anchoring during the most depressing period in Korean history, the 1997 Asian financial crisis
Kwon Jae-hong 권재홍	As weekend main anchor: November 16, 1996—May 7, 2000 As weekday main anchor: October 30, 2000—December 31, 2001 April 5, 2010—November 15, 2013	
Uhm Ki-young 엄기영	October 9, 1989—November 8, 1996 January 1, 2002—February 1, 2008	He and Lee Deuk-ryul are the longest-serving anchors of the show.
Kim Sung-soo 김성수	February 4, 2008—March 21, 2008	
Shin Kyung-min 신경민	As weekend main anchor: April 17, 1993—September 10, 1994 As weekday main anchor: March 24, 2008—April 13, 2009	He served as a member of the 20th National Assembly under the Democratic Party of Korea. He is currently a political commentator.
Kwon Soon-pyo 권순표	April 27, 2009—April 2, 2010	He is currently the anchor for its newscast News Exhibit.
Park Yong-chan 박용찬	As weekend main anchor: June 29, 2013—November 17, 2013 As weekday main anchor: May 12, 2014—November 6, 2015	
Lee Sang-hyun 이상현	November 9, 2015—December 7, 2017	
Kim Soo-ji 김수지	As weekend sub-anchor: August 19, 2017—December 3, 2017 As weekday main anchor: December 8, 2017—December 22, 2017	She also served as anchor for News Today.
Park Sung-ho 박성호	December 26, 2017—July 13, 2018	He is currently a correspondent based in Washington.
Wang Jong-myung 왕종명	As weekend main anchor: May 7, 2009—October 31, 2010 As weekday main anchor: July 16, 2018—present	He has a thick voice and a serious tone when reporting or anchoring, but when fellow anchor Lee Jae-eun features him on vlogs in their YouTube channel Don't You Do News? (뉴스안하니), he is the total opposite.

Sub-anchors

Name	Duration	Notes
Baek Ji-yeon 백지연	May 9, 1988—September 4, 1992 April 12, 1993—September 16, 1994 October 2, 1995—August 9, 1996	
Kim Eun-hye 김은혜	April 26, 1999—October 27, 2000	She was the first reporter to become sub-anchor, and is currently a member of the National Assembly, representing the city of Seongnam in Gyeonggi under the People Power Party.
Park Hye-jin 박혜진	As weekend sub-anchor: October 9, 2004—February 26, 2006 As weekday sub-anchor: March 6, 2006—April 24, 2009	She currently is a freelance announcer. Her most recent stint was during MBC's election coverage for the 2020 South Korean legislative election.
Kim So-young 김소영	As weekend sub-anchor: March 23, 2013—November 17, 2013 As weekday sub-anchor: November 18, 2013—May 9, 2014	
Bae Hyun-jin 배현진	As weekend sub-anchor: June 12, 2010—April 3, 2011 As weekday sub-anchor: April 8, 2011—November 15, 2013 May 12, 2014—December 7, 2017	She is currently a member of the National Assembly, representing the Songpa District, Seoul under the People Power Party.
Son Jung-eun 손정은	As weekend sub-anchor: March 29, 2008—May 23, 2010 As weekday sub-anchor: December 26, 2017—July 13, 2018	
Lee Jae-eun 이재은	July 16, 2018—present	

=== Weekends ===
Main anchors

Name	Duration	Notes
Cha In-tae 손석희	January 3, 1986—May 27, 1989	
Sohn Suk-hee 손석희	February 15, 1987—April 16, 1989 October 26. 1991—May 17, 1992	He is currently co-CEO at JTBC and previously headed the network's news organization, as well as an anchoring stint at its flagship newscast JTBC Newsroom.
Goo Bon-hong 구본홍	September 2, 1989—October 29, 1989	
Kim Dong-jin 김동진	November 4, 1989—November 18, 1989	
Lee Sang-yeol 이상열	November 25, 1989—May 17, 1992	
Jung Gil-yong 정길용	May 23. 1992—April 9, 1993	
Jung Dong-young 정동영	September 11, 1994—January 7, 1996	
Cho Jung-min 조정민	January 13. 1996—November 10, 1996	
Park Kwang-on 박광온	May 13, 2000—January 13, 2002	He's currently a member of the National Assembly, representing the city of Suwon in Gyeonggi Province under the Democratic Party.
Kim Se-yong 김세용	January 19, 2002—April 27, 2003 March 29, 2008—April 26, 2009	He is currently the head of MBC's Wonju bureau.
Kim Sang-soo 김상수	May 3, 2003—October 5, 2003	
Yeon Bo-heum 연보흠	March 19, 2005—March 11, 2007	
Kim Joo-ha 김주하	As weekday sub-anchor: October 30, 2000—March 3, 2006 As weekend main anchor: March 17, 2007—March 23, 2008	She is the first woman to anchor the newscast by herself, setting a precedent for women to become main anchors of their respective newscasts (i.e. KBS News 9's Lee So-jung).
Choi Il-gu 최일구	October 11, 2003—March 13, 2005 November 6, 2010—February 19, 2012	He left the newscast and his press director position to participate in the 2012 MBC general strike. He is currently the weekend anchor for MBN Comprehensive News.
Kim Chang-wook 김창옥	February 25, 2012—March 18, 2012 April 14, 2012—May 6, 2012	This was during the 2012 MBC general strike.
Kim Sang-woon 김상운	March 24, 2012—April 8, 2012	This was during the 2012 MBC general strike.
Jung Yeon-kook 정연국	May 12, 2012—June 10, 2012	This was during the 2012 MBC general strike.
Choi Dae-hyun 최대현	June 16, 2012—October 7, 2012	
Shin Dong-ho 신동호	October 13, 2012—June 23, 2013	
Do In-tae 도인태	November 23, 2013—May 11, 2014	
Lee Joon-hee 이준희	December 17, 2017—June 11, 2017	
Cheon Hyun-woo 천현우	June 17, 2017—December 3, 2017	
Uhm Joo-won 엄주원	December 9, 2017—December 25, 2017	
Kim Soo-jin 김수진	December 30, 2017—July 21, 2019	She was the second woman to host the newscast by herself after Kim Joo-ha.
Kim Kyung-ho 김경호	July 27, 2019—present	

Sub-anchors

Name	Duration	Notes
Kim Eun-joo 김은주	As weekday sub-anchor: May 9, 1988—September 4, 1992 April 12, 1993—September 16, 1994 October 2, 1995—August 9, 1996 As weekend sub-anchor: May 12, 1991—September 6, 1992 September 24, 1994—August 4, 1996 April 25, 1998—September 20, 1998	
Choi Yul-mi 최율미	September 12, 1992—April 11, 1993 November 16, 1996—August 24, 1997 January 8, 2000—July 7, 2002	
Jung Hye-jung 정혜정	As weekday sub-anchor: September 19, 1994—September 29, 1995 September 22, 1997—April 23, 1999 As weekend sub-anchor: April 17, 1993—September 18, 1994 July 13, 2002—October 5, 2003	
Lee Joo-yeon 이주연	August 10, 1996—November 10, 1996	
Kim Ji-eun 김지은	As weekday sub-anchor: September 7, 1992—April 9, 1993 November 11, 1996—September 19, 1997 As weekend sub-anchor: August 30, 1997—October 5, 1997	
Park Na-rim 박나림	October 11, 1997—April 19, 1998	
Park Young-sun 박영선	September 26, 1998—December 26, 1999	She is currently the Minister of SMEs and Startups under the Moon Jae-in administration.
Choi Yoon-young 최윤영	October 11, 2003—October 3, 2004	
Seo Hyun-jin 서현진	March 4, 2006—March 11, 2007	
Moon Ji-ae 문지애	April 9, 2011—January 22, 2012	
Yang Seung-eun 양승은	May 12, 2012—March 17, 2013	
Lee Jung-min 이정민	As weekday sub-anchor: April 27, 2009 – April 7, 2011 As weekend sub-anchor: May 17, 2014—December 11, 2016	She is currently the deputy general manager for MBC's announcer bureau.
Jung Da-hee 정다희	December 17, 2016—June 11, 2017	
Park Yeon-kyung 박연경	June 17, 2017—August 13, 2017	
Kang Da-som 강다솜	November 23, 2013—May 11, 2014 July 27, 2019—June 28, 2020	She is currently doing segments for 14F, one of MBC's YouTube channels.
Kim Cho-rong 김초롱	July 4, 2020—present	
