= The Foundation of Broadcast Culture =

South Korean foundation

- Type: Statutory/Non-Profit
- Founded: 26 December 1988
- Headquarters: Seoul, South Korea
- Area served: South Korea
- Website: www.fbc.or.kr

The Foundation for Broadcast Culture (Korean: 방송문화진흥회; RR: Bangsong Munhwa Jinheunghoe) is the only institution dedicated to the promotion of broadcasting in South Korea. Partly to address concerns following the country's 1987 democratic reforms, the National Assembly established the Foundation for Broadcast Culture to insulate Munhwa Broadcasting Corporation (MBC) from political influence and KBS. The foundation was established as a not-for-profit statutory corporation in accordance with "The Foundation for Broadcast Culture" Act (Ordinance No. 6137) first formulated on December 26, 1988.

It is a major shareholder of MBC to which 70% of the stocks of MBC was donated as "the initial fund for the promotion of broadcasting culture" from the government. Except for the corporate structure, the concept of the foundation is similar to Channel 4 Television Corporation in the United Kingdom (formerly a subsidiary of the British IBA).
