= KBS News 9 =

Flagship newscast of South Korean state network KBS

- Current logo since 2023
- Genre: News
- Presented by: Weekdays: Choi Moon-jung; Park Ji-won; Weekends: Lee Yoon-hee
- Narrated by: Nam Hyun-jong (weekdays); Lee Jae-seok (weekends)
- Country of origin: South Korea
- Original language: Korean

Production
- Production location: South Korea
- Camera setup: Multiple-camera setup
- Running time: 60 minutes

Original release
- Network: KBS 1 KBS News 24; KBS World (Worldwide)
- Release: August 31, 1964 – present

KBS Nine O'Clock News (also known as KBS News 9 (KBS 뉴스9 in Korean)) is a South Korean television news broadcasting show broadcast by KBS1. It first premiered on August 31, 1964 as a short news bulletin, but it later expanded and became KBS News 9, which premiered on October 24, 1977. The newscast aired every night at 9 pm to 9:30 pm KST. Choi Moon-jung and Park Ji-won serves as the current anchors for weekdays while Lee Yoon-hee serves as the current anchor for weekends. The program is seen across South Korea, as well as on KBS World service which provides headline tickers in English throughout the newscast. The newscast has news, sports, weather, health, society, as well as other topics.

English subtitles were added to the web stream on October 7, 2024.

== History ==
During the 1980 Gwangju uprising, its coverage was primarily favorable towards the military regime. In 2017, KBS entered a strike and its airtime was cut.

== KBS Sports 9/Local Window at 9:30 ==
Between 9:30 and 9:35 pm, local KBS stations outside Seoul opt-out from the national newscast to provide a 15-minute regional newscast in their respective areas. At around 9:45, all stations rejoin Seoul for KBS Sports 9, a sub-newscast airing Korean and international sports news, to be followed by the national weather.

== Anchors ==
Choi Moon-jong and Park Ji-won currently anchor the weekday edition, while Kim Hyun-kyung and Park So-hyun helm the weekend edition. Lee Yoon-jeong does the sports news on weekdays, and Kim Jong-hyun does it on weekends. The weather forecast is presented by Kang Ah-rang on weekdays, while Choi Hyun-mi does it on weekends.

== Broadcast times ==
- 9:00 pm - KBS1, KBS News 24 (Nationwide)
- 9:00 pm KST - KBS World TV (Worldwide)
- 9:00-9:40 pm - KBS Radio 1, KBS Radio 3, KBS Hanminjok Radio, KBS 1FM (Nationwide Radio Simulcast)
