= MBC News Now =

South Korean public television news channel

- Country: South Korea
- Network: Munhwa Broadcasting Corporation

Programming
- Language: Korean
- Picture format: 2160p UHDTV (downscaled to 1080i and 480i for the HDTV and SDTV feeds respectively)

Ownership
- Owner: Munhwa Broadcasting Corporation
- Sister channels: MBC TV

History
- Launched: 4 February 2020; 6 years ago

Availability

Terrestrial
- Digital terrestrial television: Channel 9.2

Streaming media
- MBC: Watch live (South Korea only)

MBC News Now is an over-the-air news channel owned by the Munhwa Broadcasting Corporation. The channel broadcasts on MBC TV's multiplex.

== History ==
The origin of the channel lies on a 2007 plan by MBC to launch a dedicated news channel on digital terrestrial television, using the MBC multiplex. The goal was to launch the channel in 2010, though tests would begin in December 2007 to provide information during snowstorms, and in 2008, its tests would increase to a nine-hour schedule. However, in October, KOBACO revised the plan to introduce such a service, granted that the rights to operate the channel were licensed to the relevant multiplex.

On February 4, 2020, MBC launched MBC 24 News as a web channel, on the 37th anniversary of MBC's conversion to a public service broadcaster. There was already the possibility of launching the channel on digital terrestrial television at a later date. In June 2020, it announced its conversion into an OTT service effective September 1. The aim was to reach out to users who don't regularly watch television and depend largely on the internet.

In August 2021, KOBACO suggested the creation of a terrestrial news channel (channel 9.2 using the MBC News Now multiplex) to disseminate disaster information nationwide, to viewers without access to cable television, which has news channels. As of December 2021, MBC News Now was conducting a daily 90-minute test broadcast (MBC News Now-live). MBC compared the new channel to Fox Weather and Weathernews Inc., which have dedicated teams in case of natural disasters. KOBACO received MBC's proposal on August 31, 2021.

== See also ==
- SBS Love FM
- SBS TV
- MBN
