= Shenyang Television Station =

Chinese television network

Shenyang Television Station (SYTV, Chinese: 沈阳电视台; pinyin: Shěnyáng Diànshìtái) was launched in 1979. Its programs cover the Shenyang area.

== SYTV Channels ==
- News & Comprehensive Channel
- Economic Channel (co-operate with LRTV)
- Public Channel (co-operate with LRTV)

=== Former SYTV channels ===
- Sunshine Shenyang Channel - former Movie and Drama Channel, stopped airing in 2016
- SYTV Shopping Channel - stopped airing in 2012
