= Korea New Network =

Broadcasting company in Busan, South Korea

KNN

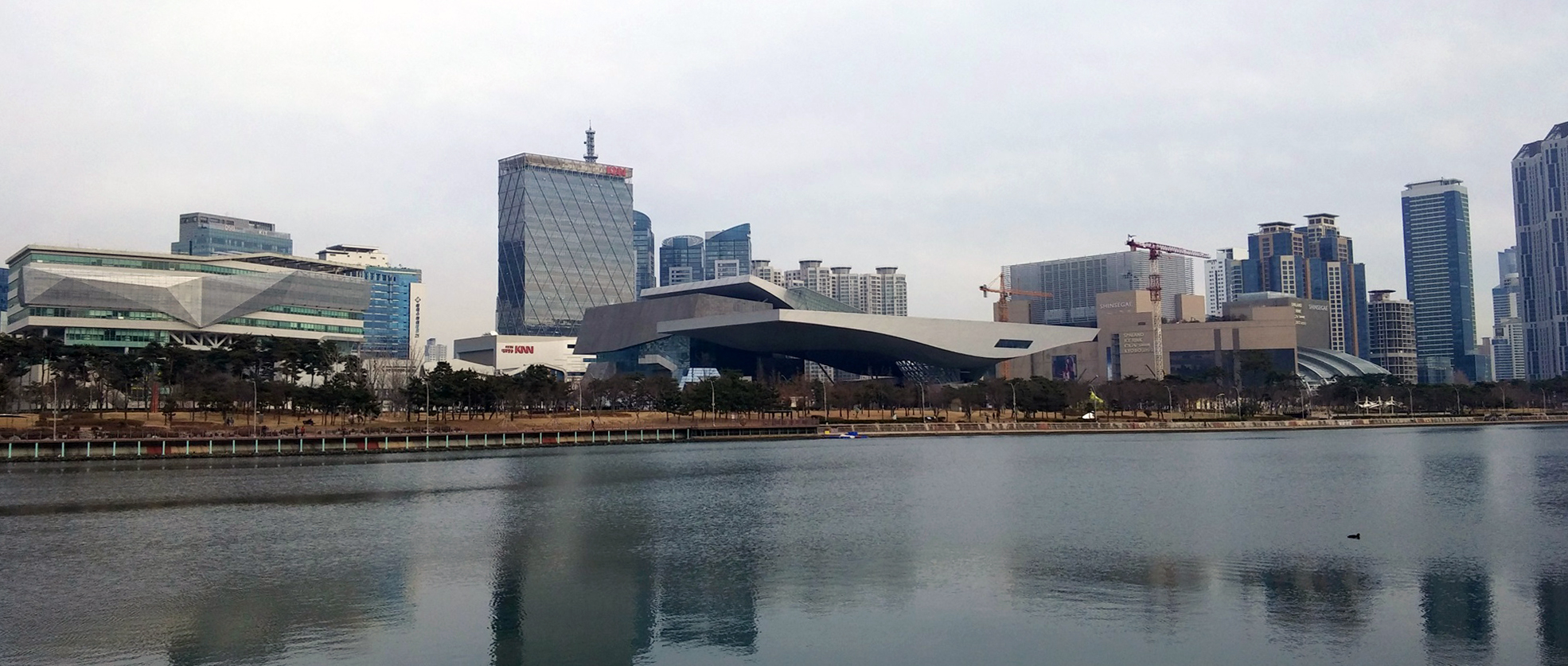
- Type: Broadcast radio and television
- Country: South Korea
- Availability: Busan and South Gyeongsang Province area
- Revenue: ▲ ₩7.5+ billion
- Owner: Nexen Tire (39.32%); Tae Young (6.30%); Sungwoo Hi-Tech (5.55%)
- Key people: Lee Oh-sang (CEO)
- Launch date: April 1994 (demo broadcast); September 7, 1994 (test broadcast); May 14, 1995 (official broadcast, television); September 9, 1997 (radio); December 31, 2003 (digital television) (digital streaming platforms)
- Picture format: 1080i (HDTV)
- Affiliations: SBS Network (both radio and TV)
- Official website: news.knn.co.kr

- Korean name
- Hangul: 코리아 뉴 네트워크
- Revised Romanization: Koria Nyu Neteuwokeu
- McCune–Reischauer: K'oria Nyu Net'wŏkŭ

(former)
- Hangul: 부산방송
- Hanja: 釜山放送
- Revised Romanization: Busan Bangsong
- McCune–Reischauer: Pusan Pangsong

The Korea New Network (KNN) (Korean: 케이엔엔 부산경남방송; RR: Ke-i-En-En) is the biggest regional free-to-air commercial broadcasting station based in Centum City, a high-tech media development complex within Haeundae in Busan, South Korea. KNN is affiliated with SBS. It was originally founded in April 1994 as Pusan Broadcasting Corporation (PSB) (Korean: 부산방송; Hanja: 釜山放送; RR: Busan Bangsong). It had first begun its demo transmissions upon its establishment in April, and later on September 7 the same year it had begun its test transmissions, and then commenced its official broadcasts on May 14, 1995. As of 2011 its own programs make up to 35 percent of all programs.

== Stations ==
HLDG-DTV
- South Gyeongsang Province; South Korea
- City: Busan
- Channels: Digital: 15 (UHF); Virtual: 6
- Branding: KNN TV

Programming
- Affiliations: SBS

Ownership
- Owner: Korea New Network

History
- First air date: May 14, 1995

Technical information
- Licensing authority: KCC

Links
- Website: http://www.knn.co.kr/

HLDG-UHDTV
ATSC 3.0 station
- South Gyeongsang Province; South Korea
- City: Busan
- Channels: Digital: 53 (UHF); Virtual: 6
- Branding: KNN UHD

Programming
- Language: Korean
- Subchannels: 6.1: 2160p UHDTV simulcast of HLDG-DTV
- Affiliations: SBS

Ownership
- Owner: Korea New Network

History
- First air date: December 29, 2017

Technical information
- Licensing authority: KCC
- Class: ATSC 3.0 experimental
- Power: 5 kW

Links
- Website: KNN UHD Viewing Guide (in Korean)

KNN Power FM (HLDG-FM)
- Busan; South Korea
- Broadcast area: South Gyeongsang Province
- Frequency: FM 99.9 MHz
- Branding: KNN Power FM

Programming
- Format: K-Pop
- Affiliations: SBS Power FM

Ownership
- Owner: Korea New Network

History
- First air date: September 9, 1997 (Busan); December 29, 2010 (Changwon); December 23, 2011 (Jinju); September 16, 2013 (Gijang, Jeonggwan); December 23, 2013 (Yangsan); September 23, 2016 (Geochang)

Technical information
- Class: all
- Power: 5kW (Busan); 1kW (Changwon, Jinju); 20W (Gijang, Jeonggwan)
- Translators: FM 102.5 MHz (Changwon); FM 105.5 MHz (Jinju); FM 96.3 MHz (Gijang, Jeonggwan, Yangsan)

KNN Love FM (HLDG-SFM)
HD Radio station
- Busan; South Korea
- Broadcast area: South Gyeongsang Province
- Frequency: FM 105.7 MHz
- Branding: KNN Love FM

Programming
- Format: Top 40 Mainstream/News/K-Pop/Adult Contemporary
- Affiliations: SBS Love FM

Ownership
- Owner: Korea New Network

History
- First air date: May 10, 2016 (Busan); May 10, 2017 (Gijang, Jeonggwan, Yangsan); October 30, 2017(Changwon); March 24, 2018(Jinju)

Technical information
- Class: all
- Power: 1kW
- Translators: FM 89.3 MHz (Gijang, Jeonggwan); FM 88.5 MHz (Yangsan); FM 90.9 (Changwon); FM 98.7 (Jinju)

- Television
  - Channel - Ch. 15 (LCN 6-1)
  - Launched - May 14, 1995
  - Affiliated to - SBS
  - Call Sign - HLDG-DTV
- FM radio 1 (KNN Power FM)
  - Frequency - FM 99.9 MHz (Busan), 102.5 MHz (Changwon), FM 105.5 MHz (Jinju), 96.3 MHz (Gijang, Yangsan, Jeonggwan), 106.7 MHz (Geochang)
  - Launched - September 9, 1997 (Busan), December 29, 2010 (Changwon), December 23, 2011 (Jinju), September 16, 2013 (Gijang, Yangsan, Jeonggwan), December 23, 2013 (Yangsan), September 23, 2016(Geochang, Hamyang)
  - Affiliated to - SBS Power FM
  - Call Sign - HLDG-FM
- FM Radio 2 (KNN Love FM)
  - Frequency - FM 105.7 MHz (Busan), 88.5 MHz (Yangsan), 89.3 MHz (Gijang, Jeonggwan), 90.9 MHz (Changwon), 98.7 MHz (Jinju)
  - Launched - May 10, 2016 (Busan), May 10, 2017 (Gijang, Jeonggwan, Yangsan), October 30, 2017 (Changwon), March 24, 2018 (Jinju)
  - Affiliated to - SBS Love FM
  - Call Sign - HLDG-SFM

== History ==
In 1994, the Kim Young-sam government issued licenses to three private television operators, to provide SBS programming to other cities in South Korea. Pusan Broadcasting was one of them. PSB started broadcasting on May 14, 1995, before the building was completed (such work ended in 1996). The station operated on UHF channel 19. In December 1999 a Gyeongnam (Changwon) branch office opened. The following month, the main shareholder changed from Hanchang to Nexen (from Yangsan, adjacent to Busan). PSB made history in 1997 by being the first broadcaster outside of Seoul to set up offices in the national capital, producing its Entertainment Park program from its purpose-built Seoul studios, and sent to Busan using ENG systems.

On October 28, 1999, PSB's Song Seop's Together 999 was broadcast on China Radio International as Beijing Arirang. PSB accepted the sale of the program to the Chinese network for a period of one year.

On December 11, 2001, Nexen Tire acquired 2,112 million shares in PSB, or 22% of the total shares. The Heung-A Tire company was the second largest shareholder with 8% (768,000 shares). Nexen's total acquisition price was 31.68 billion won.

PSB changed to its present name in May 2006.

In June 2013, Nexen Tire increased its shares in KNN from 34.24% to 37.91%.

== International co-operation ==
The station signed an agreement with Television Nishinippon Corporation in December 1999. In 2004, it was part of a three-way meeting between TNC, PSB and Dalian Television, all of which were TNC's sister stations.

== See also ==
- SBS (Korea)
- Busan and Gyeongsangnam-do
- Nexen Tire - the biggest shareholder of this broadcaster.
- Lotte Giants and NC Dinos - KNN Radio provides almost every single KBO League Baseball game of both regional teams.
- Busan International Film Festival - KNN is the official sponsor and broadcaster of this festival.
- Busan International Comedy Festival - KNN is the official sponsor and broadcaster of this festival.
- Busan Munhwa Broadcasting Corporation
