= Ulsan Broadcasting Corporation =

- Hangul: 울산방송
- Hanja: 蔚山放送
- RR: Ulsan bangsong
- MR: Ulsan pangsong

Ulsan Broadcasting Corporation (UBC) is a regional television and radio broadcasting company based in Ulsan. The station is an affiliate of the SBS Network.

== Stations ==
HLDP-DTV
- Ulsan; South Korea
- Channels: Digital: 30; Virtual: 6
- Branding: ubc Television

Programming
- Affiliations: SBS

Ownership
- Owner: Ulsan Broadcasting Corporation

History
- First air date: September 1, 1997

Technical information
- Licensing authority: KCC

Links
- Website: http://www.ubc.co.kr/

HLDP-UHDTV
ATSC 3.0 station
- Ulsan; South Korea
- Channels: Digital: 39 (UHF); Virtual: 6

Programming
- Subchannels: 6.1: 2160p UHDTV simulcast of HLDP-DTV
- Affiliations: SBS

Ownership
- Owner: Ulsan Broadcasting Corporation

History
- First air date: December 29, 2017

Technical information
- Licensing authority: KCC
- Class: ATSC 3.0 experimental
- Power: 5 kW

Links
- Website: https://www.ubc.co.kr/wp/dtv#abc

HLDP-FM
- Ulsan; South Korea
- Frequency: 92.3 MHz
- Branding: ubc Green FM

Programming
- Format: Top 40 Mainstream/K-Pop
- Affiliations: SBS Power FM

Ownership
- Owner: Ulsan Broadcasting Corporation

History
- First air date: September 1, 2001

Technical information
- ERP: 3 kW

- Television
  - Channel - Ch. 30 (LCN 6-1)
  - Launched - September 1, 1997
  - Affiliated with - SBS
  - Call Sign - HLDP-DTV
- FM radio (ubc Green FM)
  - Frequency - FM 92.3 MHz
  - Launched - September 1, 2001
  - Affiliated with - SBS Power FM
  - Call Sign - HLDP-FM

== History ==
UBC conducted test television transmissions on 15 August 1997 and started full broadcasts on 1 September. The station broadcast its signal on UHF channel 24, using a 30kW transmitter, and had installed three relay stations in Munsusan, Mipo and Eonyang. 20.4% of its programming was going to be local at launch. Its initial shareholder was the Jooriwon Department Store. It was the first station to launch as part of the second tranche of commercial television licenses in Korea, which took place in September and October that year.

== See also ==
- SBS (Korea)
