= Cheongju Broadcasting =

- Hangul: 청주방송
- Hanja: 淸州放送
- RR: Cheongju bangsong
- MR: Ch'ŏngju pangsong

Cheongju Broadcasting or CJB is a Radio and TV station in Cheongju, affiliated with the SBS Network.

== Stations ==
HLDR-DTV

North Chungcheong Province; South Korea
- Channels: Digital: 49; Virtual: 6
- Branding: CJB Television

Programming
- Affiliations: SBS

Ownership
- Owner: Cheongju Broadcasting

History
- First air date: October 18, 1997

Technical information
- Licensing authority: KCC

Links
- Website: http://www.cjb.co.kr/

HLDR-FM
- North Chungcheong Province; South Korea
- Frequencies: FM 101.5 MHz (Cheongju); FM 97.9 MHz (Chungju); FM 102.7 MHz (Jecheon)
- Branding: CJB JOY FM

Programming
- Format: Top 40 Mainstream/K-Pop
- Affiliations: SBS Power FM

Ownership
- Owner: Cheongju Broadcasting

History
- First air date: September 26, 2001 (Cheongju); December 14, 2011 (Chungju); August 23, 2013 (Jecheon)

Technical information
- Class: all
- Power: 3kW (Cheongju); 500W (Chungju); 100W (Jecheon)

- Television
  - Channel - Ch. 49 (LCN 6-1)
  - Launched - October 18, 1997
  - Affiliated to - SBS
  - Call Sign - HLDR-DTV
- FM radio (CJB JOY FM)
  - Frequency - FM 101.5 MHz (Cheongju), FM 97.9 MHz (Chungju), FM 102.7 MHz (Jecheon)
  - Launched - September 26, 2001 (Cheongju), December 14, 2011 (Chungju), August 23, 2013 (Jecheon)
  - Affiliated to - SBS Power FM
  - Call Sign - HLDR-FM

== See also ==
- SBS (Korea)
