= Taejon Broadcasting Corporation =

HLDF-DTV

South Chungcheong Province; South Korea
- City: Daejeon
- Channels: Digital: 15; Virtual: 6
- Branding: TJB Television

Programming
- Affiliations: SBS

Ownership
- Owner: Taejon Broadcasting Corporation

History
- First air date: May 14, 1995
- Call sign meaning: Daejeon Free-to-Air Media

Technical information
- Licensing authority: KCC

Links
- Website: http://www.tjb.co.kr/

HLDF-UHDTV
ATSC 3.0 station

South Chungcheong Province; South Korea
- City: Daejeon
- Channels: Digital: 53 (UHF); Virtual: 6
- Branding: TJB UHD

Programming
- Affiliations: SBS

Ownership
- Owner: Taejon Broadcasting Corporation

History
- First air date: December 29, 2017

Technical information
- Licensing authority: KCC
- Class: ATSC 3.0 experimental
- Power: 5 kW

HLDF-FM
- Daejeon and Seosan; South Korea
- Broadcast area: Daejeon, Sejong, South Chungcheong Province
- Frequencies: Daejeon: 95.7 MHz; Seosan: 96.5 MHz
- Branding: TJB Power FM

Programming
- Format: Top 40 Mainstream/K-Pop
- Affiliations: SBS Power FM

Ownership
- Owner: Taejon Broadcasting Corporation

History
- First air date: Daejeon: March 2, 1998; Seosan: January 1, 2002
- Call sign meaning: "Daejeon Free-to-Air Media"

Technical information
- Class: all
- ERP: Daejeon: 5kW; Seosan: 500W

- Taejon Broadcasting Corporation
- Hangul: 대전방송
- Hanja: 大田放送
- RR: Daejeon bangsong
- MR: Taejŏn pangsong

Station building.

Taejon Broadcasting or TJB (also known as True Joy Begins) is a regional television and radio broadcasting company based in Daejeon. The station is an affiliate of the SBS Network. Eventually, it was originally established on April 9, 1994, although it began its official broadcast on May 15, 1995.

== Stations ==
- Television
  - Channel - Ch. 15 (LCN 6)
  - Launched - May 14, 1995
  - Affiliated to - SBS
  - Call Sign - HLDF-DTV
- FM radio (TJB Power FM)
  - Frequency - FM 95.7 MHz (Daejeon), FM 96.5 MHz (Seosan)
  - Launched - March 2, 1998 (Daejeon)
    January 1, 2002 (Seosan)
  - Affiliated to - SBS Power FM
  - Call Sign - HLDF-FM

== See also ==
- Seoul Broadcasting System
