= Jeonju Television =

- Hangul: 전주방송
- Hanja: 全州放送
- RR: Jeonju bangsong
- MR: Chŏnju pangsong

Jeonju Television or JTV is a regional television and radio broadcasting company based in Jeonju. The station is an affiliate of the SBS Network.

== Stations ==
HLDQ-DTV

North Jeolla Province; South Korea
- Channels: Digital: 33; Virtual: 6
- Branding: Jeonju Television

Programming
- Affiliations: SBS

Ownership
- Owner: Jeonju Television Co., Ltd.

History
- First air date: September 27, 1997

Technical information
- Licensing authority: KCC

Links
- Website: http://www.jtv.co.kr/

HLDQ-FM
- North Jeolla Province; South Korea
- Frequency: 90.1 MHz
- Branding: JTV Magic FM

Programming
- Format: Top 40 Mainstream/K-Pop
- Affiliations: SBS Power FM

Ownership
- Owner: Jeonju Television Co., Ltd.

History
- First air date: August 18, 2001

Technical information
- Class: all
- ERP: 5kW

- Television
  - Channel - Ch. 33 (LCN 6-1)
  - Launched - September 27, 1997
  - Affiliated to - SBS
  - Call Sign - HLDQ-DTV
- FM radio (JTV Magic FM)
  - Frequency - FM 90.1 MHz
  - Launched - August 18, 2001
  - Affiliated to - SBS Power FM
  - Call Sign - HLDQ-FM

== History ==
JTV made test broadcasts in Nosong-dong, Jeonju-si on April 27, 1997.

JTV staff members were being sacked in 2007. One such member, Kim Chun-young, was fired due to falsification of his curriculum vitae upon registering at the company in 1997.

== See also ==
- SBS (Korea)
