= EBS2 =

EBS 2TV
- Country: South Korea
- Broadcast area: South Korea and Worldwide
- Network: Educational Broadcasting System
- Headquarters: 161, Mokdongseo-ro, Yangcheon District, Seoul

Programming
- Language: Korean
- Picture format: 2160p UHDTV (downscaled to 1080i/1080p/720p and 16:9 480i/480p for the HDTV and SDTV (feed)

Ownership
- Owner: Educational Broadcasting System
- Sister channels: EBS1

History
- Launched: 11 February 2015; 11 years ago

Links
- Website: EBS2

Availability

Terrestrial
- Digital terrestrial television: Channel 10.2 (HD)

Streaming media
- EBS Play: Watch live

EBS 2TV is a South Korean free-to-air television channel operated by the Korean Educational Broadcasting System. The channel launched on 11 February 2015 as Korea's first subchannel. The channel specializes on middle school-aged students.

== History ==
EBS2 was approved on 23 December 2014 and started broadcasting on 11 February 2015. The channel targets middle schoolers, while EBS1 remains as a channel for all ages. The channel opened at 3pm with a special ceremony at the EBS facilities. Unlike EBS1, commercial advertising is prohibited, except for government campaigns, as the channel operates as a subchannel. The government limited the subchannels to KBS and EBS.
