= Kwangju Broadcasting Corporation =

- Hangul: 광주방송
- Hanja: 光州放送
- RR: Gwangju bangsong
- MR: Kwangju pangsong

Kwangju Broadcasting Corporation or kbc is a radio and TV station in Gwangju, affiliated with the SBS Network.

== Stations ==
HLDH-DTV
- South Jeolla Province; South Korea
- City: Gwangju
- Channels: Digital: 15 (UHF); Virtual: 6
- Branding: kbc TV

Programming
- Affiliations: SBS

Ownership
- Owner: kwangju broadcasting corporation

History
- First air date: May 14, 1995

Technical information
- Licensing authority: KCC

Links
- Website: http://www.ikbc.co.kr/

HLDH-FM
- Gwangju; South Korea
- Broadcast area: South Jeolla Province
- Frequencies: FM 101.1 MHz (Gwangju, Mokpo); FM 96.7 MHz (Yeosu); FM 104.3 MHz (Yeonggwang); FM 90.7 MHz (Gwangyang)
- Branding: kbc My FM

Programming
- Format: Top 40 Mainstream/K-Pop
- Affiliations: SBS Power FM

Ownership
- Owner: kwangju broadcasting corporation

History
- First air date: February 2, 1998

Technical information
- Class: all
- Power: 5kW (Gwangju); 1kW (Yeosu); 10W (Yeonggwang); 100W (Gwangyang)

- Television
  - Channel - Ch. 15 (LCN 6-1)
  - Launched - May 14, 1995
  - Affiliated to - SBS
  - Call Sign - HLDH-DTV
- FM radio (kbc MyFM)
  - Frequency - FM 101.1 MHz (Gwangju, Mokpo), 96.7 MHz (Yeosu), 104.3 MHz (Yeonggwang), 90.7 MHz (Gwangyang)
  - Launched - February 2, 1998
  - Affiliated to - SBS Power FM
  - Call Sign - HLDH-FM

== History ==
KBC started television broadcasts in 1995. Its logo changed for the first time in May 2012. In September 2021, Hoban Construction sold its assets on KBC.

== See also ==
- SBS (Korea)
