= EBS1 =

EBS 1TV
- Country: South Korea
- Broadcast area: South Korea and Worldwide
- Network: Educational Broadcasting System
- Headquarters: 161, Mokdongseo-ro, Yangcheon District, Seoul

Programming
- Language: Korean
- Picture format: 2160p UHDTV (downscaled to 1080i/1080p/720p and 16:9 480i/480p for the HDTV and SDTV (feed)

Ownership
- Owner: Educational Broadcasting System
- Sister channels: EBS2

History
- Launched: 4 February 1981; 45 years ago (as KBS3); 27 December 1990; 35 years ago (as EBS1)
- Former names: KBS3 (4 February 1981 – 27 December 1990)

Links
- Website: EBS1

Availability

Terrestrial
- Digital terrestrial television: Channel 10.1 (HD)

Streaming media
- EBS Play: Watch live

EBS 1TV is a South Korean free-to-air television channel operated by Educational Broadcasting System. The channel launched on 4 February 1981 and became independent from KBS on 27 December 1990.

== History ==
=== KBS3 ===
The Korean Broadcasting System announced on 27 January 1981 that it would launch a third channel, KBS3, with test broadcasts scheduled for 2 February 1981. The channel absorbed KBS's educational programs (in color), taking over the middle school programs from KBS1 and the language learning classes from KBS2. KBS opened an educational radio station on the same date. The channel broadcast between 5:30pm and 11:30pm on weekdays, on Saturdays from 4pm and Sundays from 7pm. Its content was developed by the Educational Development Institute.

During the 1988 Summer Olympics, with KBS as the host broadcaster, the channel aired live coverage of niche sports, such as horse racing and cycling.

=== EBS ===
Upon the decision taken by the government to spin off KBS3 to KEDI, EBS was formed. In 2015, the channel was renamed EBS1 after the start of EBS2, the first Korean subchannel, and its programming concentrated on heterogeneous age targets, while EBS2 aimed at middle school students. EBS upgraded its equipment in December 2022 to provide UHD broadcasts, aiming to start them the following year.

== Network ==
Analog network (shut down in 2012):

- Seoul: channel 13
- Gangneung: channel 19
- Gwangju: channel 19
- Jeju: channel 20
- Ulsan: channel 21
- Cheongju: channel 21
- Busan: channel 23
- Pohang: channel 26
- Chuncheon: channel 28
- Andong: channel 29
- Yeosu: channel 30
- Jinju: channel 32
- Mokpo: channel 39
- Daejeon: channel 39
- Changwon: channel 39
- Wonju: channel 40
- Seoul: channel 43 (relay)
- Daegu: channel 44
- Jeonju: channel 45
