= Gangwon No.1 Broadcasting =

- Hangul: 지원방송
- Hanja: 지원放送
- Revised Romanization: Jiwon Bangsong
- McCune–Reischauer: Chiwŏn Pangsong

Gangwon No.1 Broadcasting or G1, formerly Gangwon Television Broadcasting (GTB), is a Radio and TV station in Gangwon Province, affiliated with the SBS Network.

== Stations ==
HLCG-DTV

Gangwon Province; South Korea
- City: Chuncheon
- Channels: Digital: 40 (UHF); Virtual: 6
- Branding: G1TV

Programming
- Affiliations: SBS

Ownership
- Owner: Gangwon No.1 Broadcasting

History
- First air date: December 15, 2001
- Former channel number: Analog: 57 (UHF)
- Call sign meaning: HL; Channel; Gangwon

Technical information
- Licensing authority: KCC
- Translator(s): UHF 16 (Gangdong, Nam, Taebaek); UHF 25 (Sokcho); UHF 36 (Hoengseong); UHF 37 (Samcheok); UHF 44 (Donghae); UHF 47 (Hongcheon); UHF 50 (Wonju)

Links
- Website: http://www.g1tv.co.kr/

HLCG-UHDTV
ATSC 3.0 station

Gangwon Province; South Korea
- Channels: Virtual: 6

Programming
- Subchannels: 6.1: 2160p UHDTV simulcast of HLCG-DTV
- Affiliations: SBS

Ownership
- Owner: Gangwon No.1 Broadcasting

History
- First air date: December 29, 2017

Technical information
- Licensing authority: KCC
- Class: ATSC 3.0 experimental
- Translator(s): UHF 34 (Hoengseong and Pyeongchang); UHF 55 (Gangneung)

G1 Fresh FM (HLCG-FM)
Chuncheon; South Korea
- Broadcast area: Gangwon Province
- Frequencies: FM 105.1 MHz (Chuncheon); FM 106.1 MHz (Gangneung); FM 103.1 MHz (Wonju); FM 99.3 MHz (Taebaek); FM 88.3 MHz (Pyeongchang); FM 101.3 MHz (Sokcho)
- Branding: G1 Fresh FM

Programming
- Format: Top 40 Mainstream/K-Pop
- Affiliations: SBS Power FM

Ownership
- Owner: Gangwon No.1 Broadcasting

History
- First air date: October 10, 2003 (Chuncheon, Gangneung); June 1, 2009 (Wonju); December 16, 2011 (Taebaek); September 1, 2012 (Pyeongchang); July 29, 2016 (Sokcho)
- Call sign meaning: HL; Channel; Gangwon

Technical information
- Class: all
- Power: 3kW (Chuncheon); 1kW (Gangneung, Pyeongchang); 500W (Wonju); 100W (Taebaek, Sokcho)

- Television
  - Channel - Ch. 36 (LCN 6–1)
  - Launched - December 15, 2001
  - Affiliated to - SBS
  - Call Sign - HLCG-DTV
- FM radio (Fresh FM)
  - Frequency - FM 105.1 MHz (Chuncheon), FM 103.1 MHz (Wonju), FM 106.1 MHz (Gangneung), FM 99.3 MHz (Taebaek), FM 88.3 MHz (Pyeongchang), FM 101.3 MHz (Sokcho)
  - Launched - October 10, 2003 (Chuncheon, Gangneung), June 1, 2009 (Wonju), December 16, 2011 (Taebaek), September 1, 2012 (Pyeongchang), July 29, 2016 (Sokcho)
  - Affiliated to - SBS Power FM
  - Call Sign - HLCG-FM

== History ==
GTB was the second-to-last SBS affiliate to start operations. On August 15, 2001, it received its license from the Ministry of Communications and was set to start test signals in November 2001, later regular broadcasts in mid-December. Its initial name in Korean was Gangwon Minbang (강원민방, literally Gangwon Private Broadcasting). TV broadcasts started on UHF channel 57 on 15 December 2001, but was suffering from reception problems in Chuncheon. GTB accused Gangwon Cable Broadcasting of demanding large sums of money to make its viewers "hostage", while Gangwon Cable Broadcasting said that it was unable to relay GTB because a special tax from Korea Telecom's networks led to the refusal to relay the station at no extra cost. After sluggish development in retransmission fees, GTB and GTB signed a commercial agreement on 26 December 2001, starting broadcasts the following day.

In November 2004, it was reported that Daeyang Co., Ltd. donated 10% of its shares in GTB.

== See also ==
- SBS (Korea)
