= Korea Media and Communications Commission =

South Korean media regulation agency

- 방송미디어통신위원회

Agency overview
- Formed: February 29, 2008
- Preceding agencies: Ministry of Information and Communication; Korea Broadcasting Commission
- Jurisdiction: Government of South Korea
- Headquarters: Gwacheon, South Korea
- Agency executives: Kim Jong Cheol, President of the Commission (Appointed); Vacant, Commission Vice-President
- Parent agency: President of Korea
- Website: kmcc.go.kr

Korean name
- Hangul: 방송미디어통신위원회
- Hanja: 放送미디어通信委員會
- RR: Bangsong midieo tongsin wiwonhoe
- MR: Pangsong midiŏ t'ongsin wiwŏnhoe

Korea Media and Communications Commission (Korean: 방송미디어통신위원회) is a South Korean media regulation agency modeled after the Federal Communications Commission of the United States of America. It was established on February 29, 2008, combining the former Korean Broadcasting Commission and the Ministry of Information and Communication. The five members of the Commission make a decision. In October 2025 under Lee Jae-myung government, the organization was renamed as Korea Media and Communications Commission, adding media part.

== Organization ==
=== Main Organization ===
- Chair
  - Spokesperson
    - Policy and Public Relations Team
    - Digital Communications Team
- Vice President
  - Members of the Standing Committee [level of Deputy Ministers] - Excluding the Vice Chair and the Standing Committee, there are 3 members.
  - Secretary-General
    - Operational Support Division
    - Audit Officer
  - Planning Coordinator
    - Innovation Planning Officer
    - Administrative law officer
    - International Cooperation Officer
    - Media Innovation Support Division
  - Broadcasting Policy Office
    - Broadcasting Policy Planning Division
    - Terrestrial Broadcasting Policy Division
    - Broadcasting Support Policy Division
    - Media Regional Policy Division
  - Korean Bureau of User Policy Communications
    - User Policy Division
    - Digital user base
    - Digital Hazard Information Response Division
    - Telecommunications Dispute Mediation Team
      - Market research examiner
        - Survey Planning Division
        - Broadcasting Market Research Division
        - Telecommunications Market Research Division
        - Additional Communications Research Support Team
  - Broadcasting infrastructure station
    - Broadcasting Infrastructure Division
    - Broadcast Advertising Policy Division
    - Organizational Evaluation Policy Division
    - Media Diversity Policy Division

=== Direct affiliation of the Commission ===
- Terminal Distribution Investigation Team
- Korea Communications Bureau
  - Daejeon Branch
  - Gwangju Branch
  - Busan Branch

=== Affiliate Committees ===
- Inter-Korean Committee for the Promotion of Broadcasting and Telecommunications Exchanges
- Media Diversity Committee
- Balanced Advertising Development Committee
- Broadcasting Dispute Mediation Committee
- Competition Assessment Committee on the Broadcasting Market
- Broadcasting Evaluation Commission
- Universal Right to Watch Commission
- Committee for the Protection of Audience Rights
- Regional Broadcasting Development Commission
- Telecom Dispute Mediation Committee

=== Affiliated organizations ===
- Korea Broadcasting Advertising Promotion Corporation (KOBACO)
- Audience Media Foundation

== Comprehensive programming ==
The KCC approved four newspaper companies, Chojoongdong (Chosun Ilbo, Joongang Ilbo, and Donga Ilbo) media cartel and Maeil Economics, to engage in the comprehensive programming for television channels on December 31, 2010. This has given more financial and political power to the right-wing conservative media groups in South Korea. Even before KCC's approval, this had generated concerns about the potential politically biased journalistic movement akin to the United States of America's Fox News. The KCC-approved comprehensive programming could potentially destroy the fair media practices starting in 2012 when the new television channels affect the domestic journalist scene.

The Comprehensive Programming channel was criticized for the lack of quality programs. They were also criticized for opening the television channels on December 1, 2011, when there was a growing outrage against Lee Myung-bak in the general public. The negative factors later made a negative first impression of the new TV channels.

The second day TV Chosun by Chosun Ilbo on December 2, 2011, was met with numerous criticisms on politically biased news captions, criticizing the remarks on the female novelist, Gong Ji-young, and reception issues that split the televised screen into two.

The first day of TV Chosun showed Kang Ho Dong in a negative light.

== Logos ==
Logo used between 2008-2025

Current logo

== Frequency ==
The KCC had suggested a unified mobile frequency interface with Japan's.

== Controversies ==
- On December 21, 2010, the KCC controversially announced that it is planning to create a guideline about monitoring the internet content in case of a tense political situation; automatically deleting any online anti-governmental message that could lead to internet censorship.
- Fitch Ratings negatively commented about the KCC's decision to allow tariff discounts for the South Korean telecommunication companies.
- KCC was not able to properly fine Apple Inc. for its illegal collection of GPS location data of Korean iPhone users.

== See also ==
- Censorship in South Korea
- Korea Communications Standards Commission
