= List of radio stations in South Korea =

This is a list of South Korean radio stations. These stations can be heard on free-to-air terrestrial radio (which requires an outdoor antenna to receive FM radio clearly since radio stations in Seoul are broadcast nationwide via propagation broadcast) or via the internet via the station's websites or PC apps.

== Korean Broadcasting System ==
KBS operates multiple radio stations.

=== KBS 1Radio ===
- Seoul (HLKA): FM 97.3 MHz, AM 711 kHz
- Chuncheon (HLKM) : FM 99.5 MHz, AM 657 kHz
- Wonju (HLCW) : FM 97.1 MHz, AM 1152 kHz
- Gangneung (HLKR) : FM 98.9 MHz, AM 864 kHz
- Daejeon (HLKI) : FM 94.7 MHz, AM 882 kHz
- Cheongju (HLKQ) : FM 89.3 MHz, AM 1062 kHz
- Chungju (HLCH) : FM 92.1 MHz
- Jeonju (HLKF) : FM 96.9 MHz, AM 567 kHz
- Gwangju (HLKH) : FM 90.5 MHz, AM 747 kHz
- Mokpo (HLKN) : FM 105.9Mhz, AM 1467 kHz
- Suncheon (HLCY) : FM 95.7 MHz, AM 630 kHz
- Daegu (HLKG) : FM 101.3, AM 738 kHz
- Andong (HLCR) : FM 90.5 MHz, AM 963 kHz
- Pohang (HLCP) : FM 95.9 MHz, AM 1035 kHz
- Busan (HLKB) : FM 103.7 MHz, AM 891 kHz
- Ulsan (HLQB) : FM 90.7 MHz, AM 1449 kHz
- Changwon (HLAI) : FM 91.7 MHz
- Jinju (HLCJ) : FM 90.3 MHz, AM 1098 kHz
- Jeju (HLKS) : FM 99.1 MHz, AM 963 kHz

=== KBS 2Radio ===
- Seoul (HLSA/HLSA-FM): AM 603 kHz FM 106.1 MHz
- Chuncheon (HLCE-FM) : FM 98.7 MHz
  - Wonju (HLCE-FM/relay) : FM 100.5 MHz
- Gangneung (HLAH-FM) : FM 102.1 MHz
- Daejeon (HLQT-FM) : FM 100.9 MHz
  - Boryeong (HLQT-FM/relay) : FM 89.5 MHz
- Cheongju (HLAC-FM) : FM 90.9 MHz
- Jeonju (HLAS-FM) : FM 92.9 MHz
- Gwangju (HLAA-FM) : FM 95.5 MHz
- Mokpo : FM 88.1 MHz
- Daegu (HLQH/HLQH-SFM) : FM 102.3 MHz, AM 558 kHz
  - Gimcheon (HLQH-SFM/relay) : FM 88.9 MHz
- Busan (HLKE-FM) : FM 97.1 MHz
- Changwon (HLKD-FM) : FM 106.1 MHz
- Suncheon (HLKZ-FM) : FM 102.7 MHz
- Jeju (HLKS-FM) : FM 91.9, FM 89.7, FM 92.7 MHz

Note : KBS Local 2Radio carries KBS 2Radio at 09:00–11:00, 14:00–18:00, and 20:00–05:00 the next day KST and KBS 2FM at 05:00–09:00, 11:00–14:00 and 18:00–20:00 KST.

=== KBS 3Radio ===
- Seoul (HLKC): FM 104.9 MHz, AM 1134 kHz
- Gangneung (HLCS) : AM 1008 kHz(defunct)
- Gwangju (HLAA) : AM 1224 kHz(defunct)
- Changwon (HLKD) : AM 936 kHz
- Jeonju (HLAS) : AM 675 kHz
- Suncheon (HLKZ) : AM 576 kHz

=== KBS 1FM ===
- Seoul (HLKA-FM): FM 93.1 MHz
- Chuncheon (HLKM-FM) : FM 91.1 MHz
- Wonju (HLCW-FM) : FM 89.5 MHz
- Gangneung (HLKR-FM) : FM 89.1 MHz
  - Taebaek (HLSJ-FM/relay) : FM 96.3 MHz
- Daejeon (HLKI-FM) : FM 98.5 MHz
- Cheongju (HLKQ-FM) : FM 94.1 MHz
  - Daejeon, Okcheon (relay) FM 102.1 MHz
- Chungju (HLCH-FM) : FM 100.3 MHz
- Jeonju (HLKF-FM) : FM 100.7 MHz
  - Namwon (HLKL-FM/relay) : FM 104.5 MHz
- Gwangju (HLKH-FM) : FM 92.3 MHz
- Mokpo (HLKN-FM) : FM 98.3 MHz
- Suncheon (HLCY-FM) : FM 94.5 MHz
- Daegu (HLKG-FM) : FM 89.7 MHz
- Andong (HLCR-FM) : FM 88.1 MHz
- Pohang (HLCP-FM) : FM 93.5 MHz
- Busan (HLKB-FM) : FM 92.7 MHz
- Ulsan (HLQB-FM) : FM 101.9 MHz
- Changwon (HLAI-FM) : FM 93.9 MHz
- Jinju (HLCJ-FM) : FM 89.3 MHz
  - Geochang (HLKW-FM/relay) : FM 92.1 MHz
- Jeju (HLCF-FM) : FM 96.3 MHz
- Seogwipo (HLCF-FM) : FM 99.9 MHz

=== KBS 2FM ===
==== FM Radio ====
- Seoul (HLKC-FM): FM 89.1 MHz
  - Gyeonggi (HLTM/relay) : FM 97.7 MHz
  - Incheon (HLNE/relay) : FM 90.9 MHz

==== DMB Radio ====
- Seoul (HLKA-TDMB): CH 12B
- Chuncheon : CH 13B
- Daejeon/Cheongju : CH 11B
- Gwangju/Jeonju: CH 12B/CH 8B/CH 7B
- Daegu : CH 7B/CH 9B
- Busan/Ulsan : CH 12B/CH 9B
- Jeju : CH 13B/CH 8B

=== KBS Hanminjok Radio ===
- Nationwide (HLSR) : AM 972 kHz, AM 1170 kHz, SW 6.015 MHz

=== KBS World Radio ===
- Various Shortwave frequencies that can be found on KBS Website.

== Educational Broadcasting System ==
=== Key transmitters ===
- Seoul/Incheon/Gyeonggi HLQL-FM 104.5 MHz (Gwanaksan 10 kW)
- Gangneung HLXV-FM 104.9 MHz (Goebangsan)
- Gwangju HLWP-FM 105.3 MHz (Mudeungsan)
- Daegu HLZH-FM 105.1 MHz (Palgongsan, 5 kW)
- Pohang HLWW-FM 106.7 MHz (Johangsan, 3 kW)
- Andong HLZA-FM 107.7 MHz (Ilwolsan, 3 kW)
- Daejeon HLTY-FM 105.7 MHz (Gyeryongsan) : mainly Daejeon area / 107.9 MHz (Sikjangsan) : available all over the Chungnam area and some parts of Chungbuk area
- Mokpo HLYY-FM 104.1 / 106.7 MHz (Daedunsan)
- Busan HLVX-FM 107.7 MHz (Hwangnyeongsan)
- Suncheon HLVZ 106.3 MHz
- Ulsan HLWA-FM 105.9 MHz (Muryongsan)
- Wonju HLWC-FM 104.9 MHz (Baegunsan, 3 kW)
- Jeonju HLBX-FM 106.9 MHz (Moaksan, 5 kW)
- Jinju HLEL-FM 105.5 MHz (Mangjinsan)
- Jeju HLVL-FM (northern part of Jeju island) 107.3 MHz (Ara)
- Seoguipo HLVL-FM (southern part of Jeju island) 104.9 MHz
- Changwon HLWJ-FM 104.3 MHz (Bulmosan)
- Cheongju HLZG-FM 105.1 MHz
- Chungju HLXF-FM 104.1 MHz (Gayeopsan)
- Chuncheon HLGY-FM 106.5 MHz (Hwaaksan)

=== Low-power relay stations ===
- Paju relay HLQL-2FM 107.1 MHz (northern Gyeonggi)
- Ongjin relay HLQL-3FM 105.9 MHz (remote Incheon)
- Okgye 106.5 MHz
- Taebaek relay 107.1 MHz
- Sokcho relay 107.7 MHz
- Yangyang relay 105.9 MHz
- Gokseong relay 104.1 MHz
- Jangheung relay 106.9 MHz
- Yeonggwang relay 106.5 MHz
- Seosan relay 102.3 MHz
- Boryeong relay 104.7 MHz
- Gumi relay 107.1 MHz
- Hoengseong relay 107.5 MHz
- Geochang relay 104.7 MHz
- Boeun relay 107.3 MHz
- Yeongdong relay 104.3 MHz
- Danyang relay 106.3 MHz
- Yanggu relay 104.5 MHz (near DMZ area)

== Munhwa Broadcasting Corporation ==
MBC operates multiple broadcast channels.

=== Seoul-MBC/HLKV ===
[Seoul Munhwa Broadcasting Corporation]

- MBC Standard FM/HLKV-SFM : FM 95.9 MHz
- MBC FM4U/HLKV-FM : FM 91.9 MHz
- Channel M/HLKV-TDMB : DMB CH 12A

=== Chuncheon-MBC/HLAN ===
[Chuncheon Munhwa Broadcasting Corporation]

- Chuncheon-MBC Standard FM : FM 92.3 / 88.9 MHz
- Chuncheon-MBC FM4U : FM 94.5 / 98.3 MHz

=== Wonju-MBC/HLSB ===
[Wonju Munhwa Broadcasting Corporation]

- Wonju-MBC Standard FM : FM 92.7, 102.5 MHz
- Wonju-MBC FM4U : FM 98.9 MHz

=== MBC-Gangwon-Yeongdong ===
[MBC Gangwon Yeongdon Corporation]
Gangneung (Headquarters)/HLAF

- MBC-Gangwon-Yeongdong Standard FM : FM 96.3, 100.7, 99.7 MHz, AM 1287 kHz
- MBC-Gangwon-Yeongdong FM4U : FM 94.3, 90.7, 96.9 MHz

Samcheok (Branch)/HLAQ

- MBC-Gangwon-Yeongdong Standard FM : FM 93.1, 101.5 MHz
- MBC-Gangwon-Yeongdong : FM 99.9, 98.1 MHz

=== Daejeon-MBC/HLCQ ===
[Daejeon Munhwa Broadcasting Corporation]

- Daejeon-MBC Standard FM : FM 92.5, 91.3, 93.7 MHz
- Daejeon-MBC FM4U : FM 97.5 MHz

=== MBC-Chungbuk ===
[MBC Chungbuk Corporation]
Chungju (Headquarters)/HLAO

- MBC-Chungbuk Standard FM Chungju : FM 96.1, 94.7, 94.1 MHz
- MBC-Chungbuk FM4U Chungju : FM 88.7 MHz

Cheongju (Branch)/HLAX

- MBC-Chungbuk Standard FM Cheongju : FM 107.1, 96.3 MHz
- MBC-Chungbuk FM4U Cheongju : FM 99.7 MHz

=== Jeonju-MBC/HLCX ===
[Jeonju Munhwa Broadcasting Corporation]

- Jeonju-MBC Standard FM : FM 94.3, 101.7 MHz, AM 855 kHz
- Jeonju-MBC FM4U : FM 99.1 MHz

=== Gwangju-MBC/HLCN ===
[Gwangju Munhwa Broadcasting Corporation]

- Gwangju-MBC Standard FM : FM 93.9, 101.9 MHz, AM 819 kHz
- Gwangju-MBC FM4U : FM 91.5 MHz

=== Mokpo-MBC/HLAM ===
[Mokpo Munhwa Broadcasting Corporation]

- Mokpo-MBC Standard FM : FM 89.1 MHz
- Mokpo-MBC FM4U : FM 102.3 MHz

=== Yeosu-MBC/HLAT ===
[Yeosu Munhwa Broadcasting Corporation]

- Yeosu-MBC Standard FM : FM 100.3, 107.1, 101.3 MHz
- Yeosu-MBC FM4U : FM 98.3 MHz

=== Daegu-MBC/HLCT ===
[Daegu Munhwa Broadcasting Corporation]

- Daegu-MBC Standard FM : FM 96.5, 98.7, 100.3 MHz
- Daegu-MBC FM4U : FM 95.3 MHz

=== Andong-MBC/HLAW ===
[Andong Munhwa Broadcasting Corporation]

- Andong-MBC Standard FM : FM 100.1 MHz
- Andong-MBC FM4U : FM 91.3 MHz

=== Pohang-MBC/HLAV ===
[Pohang Munhwa Broadcasting Corporation]

- Pohnag-MBC Standard FM : FM 100.7, 102.7, 98.5 MHz
- Pohang-MBC FM4U : FM 97.9, 94.9, 90.9 MHz

=== Busan-MBC/HLKU ===
[Busan Munhwa Broadcasting Corporation]

- Busan-MBC Standard FM : FM 95.9, 106.5 MHz
- Busan-MBC FM4U : FM 88.9 MHz

=== Ulsan-MBC/HLAU ===
[Ulsan Munhwa Broadcasting Corporation]

- Ulsan-MBC Standard FM : FM 97.5 MHz
- Ulsan-MBC FM4U : FM 98.7 MHz

=== MBC-Gyeongnam ===
[MBC Gyeongnam Corporation]
Jinju (Headquarters)/HLAK

- MBC-Gyeongnam Standard FM Jinju : FM 91.1, 93.5 MHz
- MBC-Gyeongnam FM4U Jinju : FM 97.7, 96.1 MHz

Changwon (Branch)/HLAP

- MBC-Gyeongnam Standard FM Changwon : FM 98.9, 96.7 MHz
- MBC-Gyeongnam FM4U Changwon : FM 100.5 MHz

=== Jeju-MBC/HLAJ ===
[Jeju Munhwa Broadcasting Corporation]

- Jeju-MBC Standard FM : FM 97.9, 97.1, 106.5 MHz
- Jeju-MBC FM4U : FM 90.1, 102.9, 102.5 MHz

== Seoul Broadcasting System ==
SBS operates multiple broadcast channels.

=== SBS Radio/HLSQ ===
[Seoul Broadcasting System Radio Networks Ltd.]

- SBS Love FM/HLSQ-SFM : FM 103.5, 98.3 MHz
- SBS Power FM/HLSQ-FM : FM 107.7, 100.3 MHz
- SBS V-Radio/HLSQ-TDMB : DMB CH 12C

=== G1 Broadcasting Company/HLCG ===
[G1 Broadcasting Company]

- G1 Fresh-FM : FM 105.1, 103.1, 106.1, 99.3, 88.3, 101.3 MHz

=== TJB/HLDF ===
[Taejon Broadcasting Corporation]

- TJB POWER FM : FM 95.5, 95.7, 96.1, 96.5 MHz

=== CJB/HLDR ===
[Choengju Broadcasting Corporation]

- CJB JOY FM : FM 101.5, 97.9, 102.7 MHz

=== JTV/HLDQ ===
[Jeonju Television]

- JTV MAGIC FM : FM 90.1 MHz

=== kbc/HLDH ===
[Kwangju Broadcasting Corporation]

- kbc MY FM : FM 101.1, 96.7, 104.3, 90.7 MHz

=== TBC/HLDE ===
[Taegu Broadcasting Corporation]

- TBC DREAM FM : FM 99.3, 106.5, 99.7 MHz

=== KNN/HLDG ===
[Korea New Network]

- KNN Love FM : FM 105.7, 88.5, 89.3, 90.9, 98.7 MHz
- KNN Power FM : FM 99.9, 96.3, 102.5, 105.5, 106.7 MHz

=== ubc/HLDP ===
[Ulsan Broadcasting Corporation]

- ubc GREEN FM : FM 92.3 MHz

=== JIBS, HLQC-FM and HLKJ-FM ===
[Jeju International Broadcasting System]

- JIBS NEW-POWER FM : FM 101.5, 98.5, 97.5 MHz

== Christian Broadcasting System ==
CBS operates multiple national and local broadcast channels.

- CBS Standard FM (HLKY, HLKY-SFM) : AM 837 KHz, FM 98.1, 100.7 MHz
- CBS Music FM (HLKY-FM) : FM 93.3 MHz

=== Provincial CBS FM stations ===
- Busan CBS FM (HLKP-FM) : FM 102.1, 105.3 MHz
- Daegu CBS FM (HLKT-FM) : FM 97.1 MHz
- Gwangju CBS FM (HLEM-FM) : FM 98.1 MHz

=== Provincial CBS AM/SFM Stations ===
- Gangwon CBS SFM (HLDC-FM) : FM 93.7, 94.9 MHz
- Gangwon yeongdong CBS SFM (HLCO-FM) : FM 91.5, 91.9, 91.9 MHz
- Daejeon CBS SFM (HLDX-SFM) : FM 91.7, 99.3 MHz
- Cheongju CBS SFM (HLAC-FM) : FM 91.5, 99.3 MHz
- Daegu CBS AM (HLKT-SFM) : FM 103.1, 92.3 MHz
- Pohang CBS SFM (HLCB-FM) : FM 91.5 MHz
- Busan CBS AM (HLKP-SFM) : FM 102.9 MHz
- Ulsan CBS SFM (HLCD-FM) : FM 100.3 MHz
- Gyeongnam CBS SFM (HLCC-FM) : FM 106.9, 94.1 MHz
- Jeonbuk CBS AM (HLCM-SFM) : FM 103.7, 90.7, 96.3 MHz
- Gwangju CBS AM (HLCL-SFM) : FM 103.1 MHz
- Jeonnam CBS SFM (HLCL-FM) : FM 102.1, 89.5 MHz
- Jeju CBS SFM (HLKO-FM) : FM 93.3, 90.9 MHz

== Far East Broadcasting Company ==
- Seoul FEBC (HLKX/HLKX-SFM) : AM 1188 kHz, FM 106.9 MHz
- Youngdong FEBC (HLDY-FM) : FM 90.1, 102.9, 100.9 MHz
- Daejeon FEBC (HLAD-FM) : FM 93.3 MHz
- Gwangju FEBC (HLED-FM) : FM 93.1 MHz
- Mokpo FEBC (HLKW-FM) : FM 100.5 MHz
- Jeonmandongbu FEBC (HLEI-FM) : FM 97.5, 92.9 MHz
- Daegu FEBC (HLKK-FM) : FM 91.9, 105.9 MHz
- Pohang FEBC (HLDZ-FM) : FM 90.3 MHz
- Busan FEBC (HLQQ-FM) : FM 93.3, 96.7 MHz
- Ulasn FEBC (HLQR-FM) : FM 107.3 MHz
- Changwon FEBC (HLDD-FM) : FM 98.1, 92.5 MHz
- Jeju FEBC (HLAZ/HLAZ-SFM) : AM 1566 kHz, FM 104.7, 101.1 MHz
- Jeonbuk FEBC (HLEN-FM) : FM 91.1 MHz

== Other stations ==
=== Seoul/Incheon/Gyeonggi ===
- WBS FM (HLQK) : FM 89.7 MHz
- 90.7 iFM (HLDO) : FM 90.7 MHz
- YTN News FM (HLQV) : FM 94.5 MHz
- TBS FM (HLST) : FM 95.1 MHz
- Gugak FM (HLQA) : FM 99.1 MHz
- 101.3 TBS eFM (HLSW) : FM 101.3 MHz (English-language radio station)
- BBS FM (HLSG) : FM 101.9, 88.1 MHz
- AFN Korea (HLKZ): FM 102.7 MHz, AM 1530 kHz (English-language radio station targeting the US Armed Forces in Korea)
- CPBC FM (HLQP) : FM 105.3 MHz (Catholic radio)
- KFN FM (HLSF/Gukpang FM) : FM 96.7 MHz (Military Radio Broadcast)
- TBN FM (HLSU) : FM 100.5, 105.5 MHz
- Seongnam FM : FM 90.7 MHz (Low Power Station, Gyeonggi)
- Gwanak FM : FM 100.3 MHz (Low Power Station, Gwanak-gu Area)
- Mapo FM : FM 100.7 MHz (Low Power Station, Mapo-gu Area)
- OBS Radio (HLMD) : FM 99.9 MHz

=== Busan ===
- HLDW-FM : FM 101.1, 94.3, 101.5 MHz
- HLQJ-FM : FM 104.9 MHz
- HLDA-FM : FM 89.9, 89.5, 88.1 MHz
- HLDN-FM : FM 94.9 MHz
- Busan e-FM (HLSX) : FM 90.5 MHz (English-language radio station)

=== Jeonbuk ===
- HLDV-FM : FM 97.9 MHz
- HLCM-FM : FM 102.5 106.1 MHz

=== Ulsan ===
- HLQU-FM : FM 88.3 MHz
- HLCV-FM : FM 104.1 MHz

=== Gongju ===
- Geumgang FM : FM 104.9 MHz (Low Power Station)
- HLDT-FM : FM 102.9 MHz

=== Chuncheon ===
- HLQM-FM : FM 100.1, 93.5, 97.1, 104.3 MHz

=== Gangwon ===
- HLSV-FM : FM 105.9, 103.7, 105.5, 95.1, 95.3, 89.3 MHz

=== Cheongju ===
- HLDJ-FM : FM 96.7, 106.7 MHz

=== Chungbuk ===
- HLEO-FM : FM 103.3, 93.5 MHz

=== Gyeongnam ===
- HLEE-FM : FM 95.5, 100.1 MHz

=== Daejeon ===
- HLQO-FM : FM 106.3 MHz
- HLDT-FM : FM 102.9, 103.9 MHz
- HLEK-FM : FM 90.5, 101.7, 99.3 MHz

=== Daeɡu ===
- HLDK-FM : FM 93.1, 100.5, 100.7, 96.9 MHz
- HLCS-FM : FM 98.3 MHz
- HLDI-FM : FM 94.5, 97.7, 105.5 MHz
- SCN FM : FM 89.1 MHz (Low Power Station)
- HLDU-FM : FM 103.9, 95.9 MHz

=== Gyeongbuk ===
- HLEF-FM : FM 103.5, 103.7 MHz

=== Gwangju ===
- HLDL-FM : FM 99.9, 99.5 MHz
- HLQN-FM : FM 107.9 MHz
- HLDB-FM : FM 89.7, 105.7, 105.1 MHz
- CBN Radio : FM 88.9 MHz (Low Power Station)
- GFN (HLSY-FM): FM 98.7, 93.7 MHz (English-language radio station)
- HLDM-FM : FM 97.3, 103.5 MHz
- HLEG : FM 99.3 MHz

=== Yeongju ===
- Yeongju Community radio : FM 89.1 MHz (Low Power Station)

=== Jeju ===
- Arirang Radio : FM 88.7, 88.1, 101.9 MHz (English-language radio station)
- HLEL-FM : FM 94.9, 100.5 MHz
- HLEH-FM : FM 105.5, 105.9 MHz

Low Power Stations are stations that broadcasts at the power of between 1 and 50 watts.

== South Korean Jammer (Blocking North Korean broadcasts) ==
Medium Wave:

- 657 kHz, Goyang and Hwaseong area
- 810 kHz, Hwaseong area
- 819 kHz, Goyang and Hwaseong area
- 855 kHz, Goyang and Hwaseong area

FM

- 89.4 MHz, Seoul and Cheonan Area
- 92.5 MHz, Seoul Area
- 92.8 MHz, Seoul Area
- 93.6 MHz, Seoul and Cheonan Area
- 97.0 MHz, Seoul and Cheonan Area
- 97.8 MHz, Seoul and Cheonan Area
- 102.3 MHz, Incheon Gangwha Area
- 103.7 MHz, Seoul Area

== Defunct radio stations ==
- Tongyang Broadcasting Corporation: FM 89.1 MHz, AM 639 kHz and local stations. (In 1980 the station was forcibly merged into KBS Radio; as a result of this, Seoul TBC Radio was split into two and became KBS 2FM and KBS Radio 3, and the provincial TBC Radio stations became the KBS Local FM network that retransmitted 1FM and 2FM from 1980 until 2001 and 1FM full time from 2001 onwards.)
- Donga Broadcasting System: AM 792 kHz (In 1980 the station was forcibly merged into KBS Radio and became KBS Radio Seoul. KBS Radio Seoul closed in 1989. Frequency now owned by SBS and became SBS Love FM.)
- Jeonil Broadcasting Corp.: AM 1224 kHz
- Seohae Broadcasting Corp.: AM 675 kHz (Frequency now assigned to KBS Radio 3)
- Hanguk FM: FM 89.7 MHz (Station was closed due to a threat of forced merger to KBS in 1980.)
- Naju Bangsong : FM 96.1 MHz

== See also ==
- Media of South Korea
- List of radio stations in North Korea
- Radio jamming in Korea
