= List of radio stations in North Korea =

The list of radio stations in North Korea lists all the national and regional radio stations in North Korea.

Radio is the most commonly used broadcast media in North Korea. All stations are subject to the strict control of the government and carry no advertising. Some of the transmitters carry regional programmes in the afternoons, but usually relay the central programme from Pyongyang.

There are five North Korean radio networks:

- Korean Central Broadcasting Station: the main domestic full service radio network, primarily broadcast on mediumwave with some FM and shortwave transmitters
- Pyongyang FM Broadcasting Station: FM-only, domestic music network
- Pyongyang Broadcasting Station: an "all-Korea" service primarily aimed at South Koreans and ethnic Koreans in China and Japan, broadcast on mediumwave and widely available on FM and shortwave. Closed in January 2024.
- Echo of Unification / Tongil Voice: Propaganda station beamed to South Korea, Shortwave and FM frequencies close to the DMZ. Closed in January 2024.
- Voice of Korea, a multi-lingual shortwave broadcaster aimed at audiences worldwide, also available on mediumwave in the Pyongyang area
- Noise jamming: blocking South Korean and other Korean language foreign broadcasts

== Korean Central Broadcasting Station ==
=== Mediumwave ===
- 702 kHz, Chongjin (50 kW) (shared with irregular, dysfunctional DRM tests)
- 720 kHz, Kanggye (500 kW) (formerly carrying Pyongyang Broadcasting Station until PBS closure in early 2024)
- 765 kHz, Hyesan (50 kW) (irregular, shared with dysfunctional DRM tests)
- 801 kHz, Kimchaek (500 kW) (irregular, shared with dysfunctional DRM tests)
- 810 kHz, Kaesong (1 kW) (irregular, shared with dysfunctional DRM tests)
- 819 kHz, Pyongyang (500 kW) (irregular, shared with dysfunctional DRM tests)
- 873 kHz, Sinuiju (250 kW) (irregular, shared with dysfunctional DRM tests)
- 882 kHz, Wonsan (250 kW) (irregular, shared with dysfunctional DRM tests)
- 927 kHz, Sariwon (50 kW) (irregular, shared with dysfunctional DRM tests)
- 999 kHz, Hamhung (50 kW) (irregular, shared with dysfunctional DRM tests)
- 1080 kHz, Haeju (1500 kW) (inactive for multiple years)

=== Shortwave ===
- 2349 kHz, Sariwon (5 kW) (inactive)
- 3205 kHz, Pyongyang (100 kW) (daily dysfunctional DRM tests)
- 3220 kHz, Hamhung (5 kW) (inactive)
- 3250 kHz, Pyongyang (100 kW) (moved from 2850 kHz in May 2020)
- 3920 kHz, Hyesan (5 kW) (inactive)
- 3959 kHz, Kanggye (5 kW) (inactive)
- 3978 kHz, Chongjin (5 kW) (inactive)
- 3985 kHz, Chongjin (10 kW) (inactive)
- 6100 kHz, Kanggye (250 kW) (low modulation and distorted audio fairly often; can be heard on 6070 kHz under Voice of Korea and vice versa — VOK can be heard under KCBS on 6100 kHz)
- 6140 kHz, Pyongyang (100 kW) (daily dysfunctional DRM tests)
- 9665 kHz, Kanggye (50 kW) (inactive for a long time)
- 11680 kHz, Kanggye (50 kW) (currently broken transmitter)

=== FM ===
- 102.3 MHz, Kaesong (2 kW)
- 102.6 MHz, Sangmasan (1 kW) (Heard by Japanese DX-ers)
- 103.5 MHz, Pyongyang (20 kW) (ex. 93.8 MHz)

== Pyongyang Broadcasting Station (defunct since early 2024) ==
=== Mediumwave (closed) ===
- 621 kHz, Chongjin (500 kW, used to share with the Japanese service of the Voice of Korea, now only VOK)
- 657 kHz, near Kangnam village, outside Pyongyang (1500 kW, now operating as an irregular, dysfunctional DRM broadcast)
- 801 kHz, Kimchaek (500 kW)
- 855 kHz, Sangwon (500 kW) (defunct)
- 1053 kHz, Haeju (1000 kW) (defunct, closed years before PBS went defunct)

=== Shortwave (closed) ===
- 3320 kHz, Pyongyang (50 kW) (defunct)
- 4557 kHz, Pyongyang (50 kW) (defunct)

=== FM (closed, except some empty carriers and 103.5, which transmits KCBS) ===
- 89.2 MHz Sariwon (10 kW)
- 89.5 MHz, Pyongyang (10 kW)
- 90.3 MHz, Pyongyang (1 kW)
- 91.1 MHz, Kangson, near Pyongyang (0.19 kW/190 W)
- 91.9 MHz, Pyongyang (1 kW)
- 92.9 MHz, Wonsan (1 kW), now empty carrier
- 93.1 MHz, Pyongyang (1 kW)
- 93.3 MHz, Pyongyang (1 kW)
- 94.5 MHz, Pyongyang (1 kW), now empty carrier
- 95.1 MHz, Pyongyang (1 kW)
- 95.9 MHz, Pyongyang (1 kW)
- 96.7 MHz, Pyongyang (1 kW), now empty carrier
- 97.3 MHz, Pyongyang (1 kW), now empty carrier
- 97.7 MHz, Pyongyang (1 kW), now empty carrier
- 98.1 MHz, Pyongyang (1 kW)
- 99.6 MHz, Pyongyang (1 kW)
- 101.1 MHz, Pyongyang (1 kW)
- 101.8 MHz, Pyongyang (1 kW)
- 103.5 MHz, Pyongyang (20 kW), now KCBS
- 104.5 MHz, Pyongsong (2 kW)
- 106.5 MHz, Pyongyang (20 kW)
- 107.7 MHz, Pyongyang (1 kW)
- 91.2 MHz, 93.9 MHz and others - Unknown locations countrywide, closed

== Pyongyang FM Broadcasting Station ==
Frequency	Location	Transmitter power	Notes
FM
90.1 MHz	Pyongsong	2 kW	
92.5 MHz	Kaesong	1 kW	closed since early 2024
92.8 MHz	Yonan	10 kW	closed since early 2024
93.3 MHz	Kanggye	5 kW	
93.6 MHz	Kaesong	10 kW	closed since early 2024
93.8 MHz	Hyesan	2 kW	
95.1 MHz	Wonsan	5 kW	
97.8 MHz	Haeju	100 kW	inactive since early 2024
101.3 MHz	Sinuiju	10 kW	
102.1 MHz	Kimchaek	1 kW	
103.0 MHz	Sariwon	2 kW	
103.7 MHz	Haeju	100 kW	inactive since early 2024
105.2 MHz	Pyongyang	20 kW	
105.5 MHz	Chongjin	10 kW	
106.0 MHz	Hamhung	20 kW	
107.2 MHz	Nampo	2 kW	

== Echo of Unification (Beamed to South Korea, defunct since early 2024) ==
Frequency	Location	Transmitter power (kW)
FM
89.4 MHz	Pyongyang	100 kW
97.0 MHz	Chorwon	100 kW
97.8 MHz	Haeju	100 kW
Shortwave (SW)
3945 kHz	Pyongyang	100 kW
3970 kHz	Chongjin	5 kW
5905 kHz	Pyongyang	100 kW

== Voice of Korea ==
=== Mediumwave ===
- 621 kHz, Chongjin (500 kW)
- 1368 kHz, Pyongyang (2 kW) — active on LSB mode

=== Shortwave ===
- 3560 kHz, Kujang (15 kW) — DRM tests, shared with KCBS and PBS, went defunct a few years ago
- 6070 kHz, Kanggye (250 kW) (distorted, with suppressed lower sideband)
- 6170 kHz, Kujang (200 kW) (winter only)
- 6185 kHz, Kujang (200 kW) (winter only)
- 7210 kHz, Kujang (200 kW)
- 7220 kHz, Kujang (200 kW)
- 7235 kHz, Kujang (200 kW)
- 7570 kHz, Kujang (200 kW) (winter only)
- 7580 kHz, Kujang (200 kW) (winter only)
- 9425 kHz, Kujang (200 kW)
- 9435 kHz, Kujang (200 kW) (winter only for Central and South America broadcasts)
- 9445 kHz, Kujang (200 kW)
- 9650 kHz, Kujang (200 kW)
- 9730 kHz, Kujang (200 kW)
- 9850 kHz, Kujang (200 kW) (winter only)
- 9875 kHz, Kujang (200 kW)
- 9890 kHz, Kujang (200 kW)
- 11635 kHz, Kujang (200 kW)
- 11645 kHz, Kujang (200 kW)
- 11710 kHz, Kujang (200 kW) (summer only for Central and South America broadcasts)
- 11735 kHz, Kujang (200 kW) (summer only for late morning and afternoon transmissions on this frequency)
- 11865 kHz, Kujang (200 kW) (summer only)
- 11910 kHz, Kujang (200 kW)
- 12015 kHz, Kujang (200 kW) (summer only for German and Russian broadcasts)
- 13650 kHz, Kujang (200 kW) (summer only for late morning and afternoon transmissions on this frequency)
- 13760 kHz, Kujang (200 kW) (Europe broadcasts are summer only)
- 15105 kHz, Kujang (200 kW)
- 15180 kHz, Kujang (200 kW) (summer only for late morning transmissions on this frequency)
- 15245 kHz, Kujang (200 kW) (summer only for Europe broadcasts)

== Noise jammer (blocking foreign broadcasts) ==
Strong, helicopter, boat engine-like "whooshing" noise. Use SDRs in Asia to locate them.

The whooshing noise often can be heard under Voice of Korea - the jammer is at the same site.

The swinging tone on 4450 kHz is often under KCBS Sinuiju on 873 kHz - the jammer is at the same site.

Shortwave:

- 3480 kHz, Wonsan (beeping, whistling tone)
- 3910 kHz, Kujang (200 kW)
- 3910 kHz, unknown location (beeping tone, to fill "dead-zone")
- 3930 kHz, Kujang (200 kW)
- 3930 kHz, unknown location (beeping tone, to fill "dead-zone")
- 3985 kHz, Kujang (200 kW)
- 3985 kHz, unknown location (whistling tone, to fill "dead-zone")
- 4450 kHz, Sinuiju (Swinging carrier, to fill "dead-zone")
- 4450 kHz, Kujang (200 kW) — multiple swinging tones
- 4885 kHz, Kujang (200 kW)
- 5920 kHz, unknown location (beeping tones, inactive or irregular?)
- 5995 kHz, Kujang (200 kW)
- 6015 kHz, Kujang (200 kW)
- 6015 kHz, unknown location (beeping tone, to fill "dead-zone")
- 5920/6045 kHz, Kujang (200 kW, 5920 kHz either irregular or inactive)
- 6250 kHz, Kujang (200 kW)
- 6350 kHz, Kujang (200 kW)
- 6520 kHz, Kujang (200 kW)
- 6520 kHz, unknown location (beeping tone, to fill "dead-zone")
- 6600 kHz, Kujang (200 kW)
- 6600 kHz, unknown location (beeping tone, to fill "dead-zone")
- 7275 kHz, Kanggye (?)
- 7355 kHz, Haeju (defunct? Haeju's MW transmissions on 1053 kHz and 1080 kHz have been defunct for many years now, could be also the case for this jammer)
- 7720 kHz, unknown location (whistling tone)
- 7540 kHz, unknown location (loud beeping)
- 7590 KHz, unknown location (North Korea Reform Radio)
- + various frequencies on various times from various locations, depending the Korean schedule of the blocked station.

Medium Wave:

- 558 kHz, Haeju area
- 567 kHz
- 603 kHz, Haeju area
- 639 kHz, Kaesong area
- 648 kHz, Kaesong area
- 711 kHz, Pyongyang, Kaesong and Haeju area
- 747 kHz
- 756 kHz, Pyongyang area
- 792 kHz, Haeju area
- 819 kHz, Pyongyang area (nighttime KCBS sign off)
- 837 kHz, Kaesong area
- 891 kHz, Pyongyang area
- 900 kHz, Kaesong area
- 963 kHz
- 972 kHz, Pyongyang area
- 1062 kHz
- 1134 kHz, Pyongyang area
- 1143 kHz, Pyongyang area
- 1170 kHz
- 1188 kHz
- 1431 kHz, Pyongyang area
- 1440 kHz
- 1467 kHz, Wonsan area
- 1566 kHz, Pyongyang area

FM

- 88.1 MHz, Kaesong
- 88.5 MHz
- 89.1 MHz, Kaesong
- 89.9 MHz, Kaesong
- 90.3 MHz, Kaesong
- 91.1 MHz, Kaesong
- 91.5 MHz, Kaesong
- 91.9 MHz, Kaesong
- 92.9 MHz
- 93.1 MHz, Kaesong
- 93.9 MHz, Kaesong
- 94.5 MHz, Kaesong
- 95.9 MHz, Kaesong
- 96.3 MHz, Kaesong
- 96.7 MHz, Kaesong
- 97.3 MHz, Kaesong
- 98.1 MHz, Kaesong
- 98.7 MHz, Kaesong
- 98.9 MHz, Haeju
- 99.5 MHz, Kaesong
- 101.7 MHz, Haeju
- 101.9 MHz, Kaesong
- 102.5 MHz, Kaesong
- 103.1 MHz, Kaesong
- 104.5 MHz, Kaesong
- 104.9 MHz, Kaesong
- 105.3 MHz, Kaesong
- 105.7 MHz, Kaesong
- 106.1 MHz, Kaesong
- 106.5 MHz, Kaesong
- 106.9 MHz, Kaesong
- 107.3 MHz, Kaesong
- 107.7 MHz, Kaesong

== See also ==
- Media of North Korea
- List of radio stations in South Korea
- Radio jamming in Korea
- Voice of Korea
