= Mass media in South Korea =

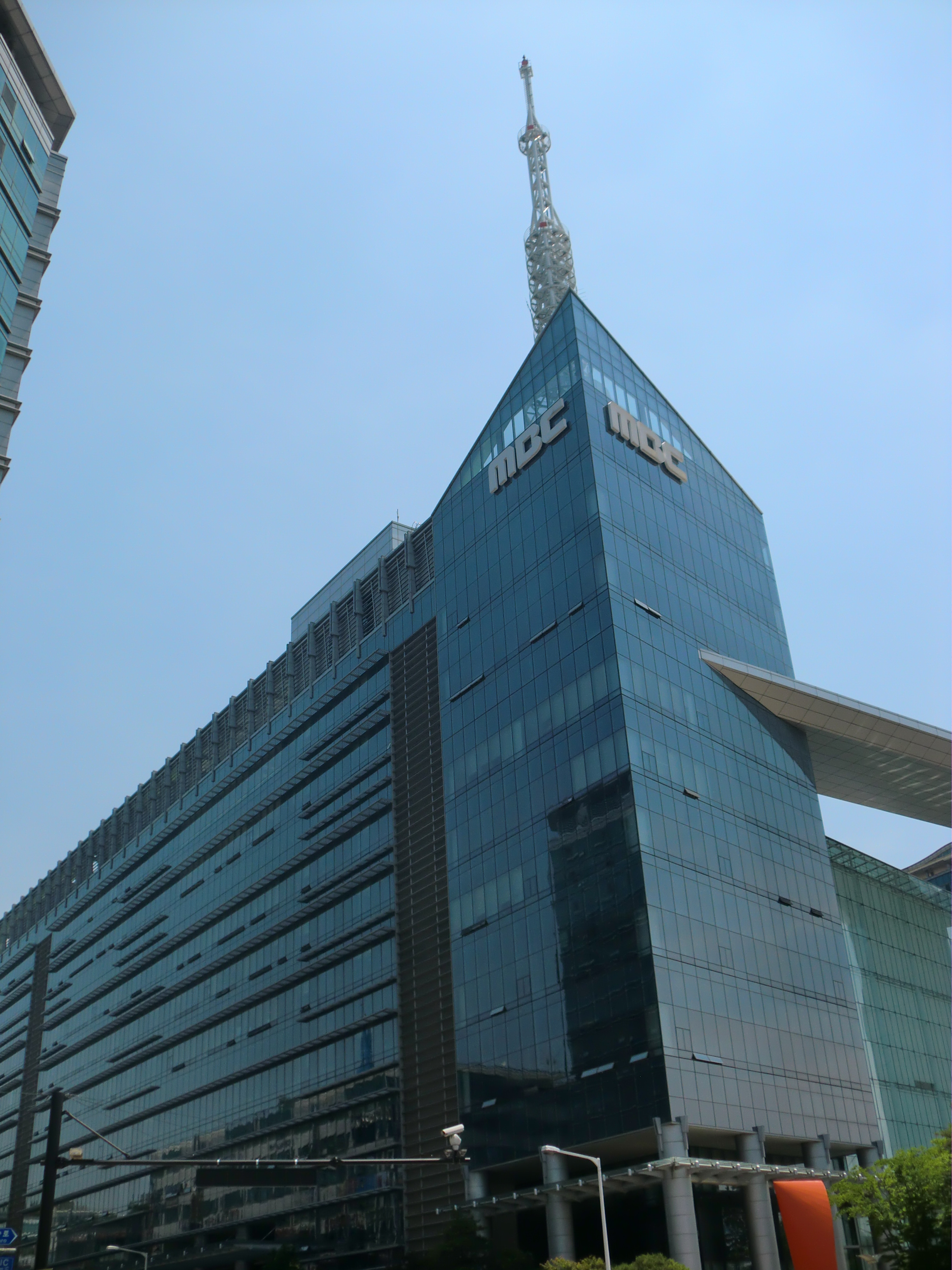
South Korea's MBC Ilsan Dream Center in Ilsan

The South Korean mass media consist of several different types of public communication of news: television, radio, cinema, newspapers, magazines, and Internet-based websites.

Modern Korean journalism began after the opening of Korea in the late 19th century. The Korean press had a strong reformist and nationalistic flavor from the beginning, but faced efforts at political control or outright censorship during most of the 20th century.

== History ==
=== Colonial period (1910–1945) ===
When the Japan-Korea Annexation Treaty was signed in 1910, the Governor-General of Korea assumed direct control of the press along with other public institutions. Following the March 1st Movement in 1919, the colonial government loosened their overt control over cultural activities and permitted several Korean newspapers to function while maintaining some behind-the-scenes direction over politically sensitive topics.

During the 1920s, Korean vernacular newspapers, such as Donga Ilbo, and intellectual journals such as Kaebyok (Creation), conducted running skirmishes with Japanese censors. Colonial authorities prohibited sales of individual issues on hundreds of occasions between 1926 and 1932. World War II mobilisation in the ensuing years ended any resemblance of autonomy for the Korean press; all Korean-language publications were outlawed in 1941.

=== After World War II (1945–1990) ===
Following the period of 1945 to 1948, which saw a burgeoning of newspapers and periodicals of every description as well as occasional censorship of the media, almost all subsequent South Korean governments have at times attempted to control the media.

A number of newsreels were produced or approved by the United States Army Military Government in Korea. The first newsreel to be produced in the South was the 1945–1947 Haebang News. Between 1953 and 1994, the government-produced newsreel Korean News was created and shown in movie theaters across the country.

Syngman Rhee's government continued the military government's Ordinance Number Eighty-Eight, which outlawed leftist newspapers. Rhee also closed moderate newspapers and arrested reporters and publishers on numerous occasions between 1948 and 1960. On taking power in 1961, Park Chung-hee's Supreme Council for National Reconstruction closed all but fifteen of Seoul's 64 daily newspapers and refused to register a comparable percentage of the country's news services, weeklies, and monthly publications while using its radio and news agencies to promote its official line. The Park government also used the Press Ethics Commission Law of 1964 and, after 1972, emergency decrees that penalized criticism of the government to keep the media in line. In 1974, the government ordered several journalists fired and used the KCIA to force Dong-a Ilbo to stop its reporting on popular opposition to the Park government by intimidating the paper's advertisers.

During the Park and the subsequent Chun Doo-hwan administrations, the government exercised considerable control and surveillance over the media through the comprehensive National Security Act. In late 1980, the Chun government established more thorough control of the news media than had existed in South Korea since the Korean War. Independent news agencies were absorbed into a single state-run agency, numerous provincial newspapers were closed, central newspapers were forbidden to station correspondents in provincial cities, the Christian Broadcasting System network was forbidden to provide news coverage, and two independent broadcasting companies were absorbed into the state-run Korean Broadcasting System (KBS). In addition, the Defense Security Command, then commanded by Roh Tae Woo, and the Ministry of Culture and Information ordered hundreds of South Korean journalists fired and banned from newspaper writing or editing. The Basic Press Act of December 1980 was the legal capstone of Chun's system of media control and provided for censorship and control of newspapers, periodicals, and broadcast media. It also set the professional qualifications for journalists. Media censorship was coordinated with intelligence officials, representatives of various government agencies, and the presidential staff by the Office of Public Information Policy within the Ministry of Culture and Information using daily "reporting guidelines" sent to newspaper editors. The guidelines dealt exhaustively with questions of emphasis, topics to be covered or avoided, the use of government press releases, and even the size of headlines. Enforcement methods ranged from telephone calls to editors to more serious forms of intimidation, including interrogations and beatings by police. One former Ministry of Culture and Information official told a National Assembly hearing in 1988 that compliance during his tenure from 1980 to 1982 reached about 70 percent.

By the mid-1980s, censorship of print and broadcast media had become one of the most widely and publicly criticized practices of the Chun government. Even the government-controlled Yonhap News Agency noted in 1989 that "TV companies, scarcely worse than other media, were the main target of bitter public criticism for their distorted reporting for the government in the early 1980s." Editorials called for the abolition of the Basic Press Act and related practices, a bill was unsuccessfully introduced in the National Assembly to the same end, and a public campaign to withhold compulsory viewers' fees in protest against censorship by the KBS network received widespread press attention. By the summer of 1986, even the ruling party was responding to public opinion.

The political liberalization of the late 1980s brought a loosening of press restraints and a new generation of journalists more willing to investigate sensitive subjects, such as the May 1980 Gwangju massacre. Roh's eight-point declaration of June 29, 1987, provided for "a free press, including allowing newspapers to base correspondents in provincial cities and withdrawing security officials from newspaper offices." The South Korean media began a rapid expansion. Seoul papers expanded their coverage and resumed the practice of stationing correspondents in provincial cities. Although temporarily still under the management of a former Blue House press spokesman, the MBC television network, a commercial network that had been under the control of the state-managed KBS since 1980, resumed independent broadcasting. The number of radio broadcast stations grew from 74 in 1985 to 111 (including both AM and FM stations) by late 1988 and 125 by late 1989. The number of periodicals rose as the government removed restrictions on the publishing industry.

There also were qualitative changes in the South Korean media. The Christian Broadcasting System, a radio network, again began to broadcast news as well as religious programming in 1987. In the same year, the government partially lifted a long-standing ban on the works of North Korean artists and musicians, many of whom were of South Korean origin. A newspaper run by dissident journalists began publication in 1988. Several other new dailies also appeared in 1988. Many of the new weekly and monthly periodicals bypassed the higher profits of the traditional general circulation magazines to provide careful analyses of political, economic, and national security affairs to smaller, specialized audiences. Observers noted a dramatic increase in press coverage of previously taboo subjects such as political-military relations, factions within the military, the role of security agencies in politics, and the activities of dissident organizations. Opinion polls dealing with these and other sensitive issues also began to appear with increasing regularity. Journalists at several of the Seoul dailies organized trade unions in late 1987 and early 1988 and began to press for editorial autonomy and a more significant role in newspaper management.

In 1989, South Korea's four largest dailies, Hankook Ilbo, Joongang Ilbo, Chosun Ilbo, and Donga Ilbo, had a combined circulation of more than 6.5 million. The anti-establishment The Hankyoreh, had 450,000 readers – less than the major dailies or smaller papers like Kyonghan Shinmun or Seoul Shinmun, but larger than four more specialized economic dailies. All the major dailies were privately owned, except for the government-controlled Hankook Ilbo. Several other daily publications had specialized readerships among sport fans and youth. Two English-language newspapers, the government-subsidized Korea Herald and the Korea Times, which was affiliated with the independent Soul immune, were widely read by foreign embassies and businesses. A Chinese-language daily served South Korea's small Chinese population.

The Yonhap News Agency provided domestic and foreign news to government agencies, newspapers, and broadcasters. Yonhap also provided information on South Korean developments in English by computerized transmission via the Asia-Pacific News Network. Additional links with world media were facilitated by four satellite link stations. The International Broadcast Centre established in June 1988 served some 10,000 broadcasters for the 1988 Seoul Olympics. The government's KBS radio network broadcast overseas in twelve languages. Two private radio networks, the Asia Broadcasting Company and Far East Broadcasting Company, served a wide regional audience that included the Soviet Far East, China, and Japan.

The South Korean government also supported Naewoe Press, which dealt solely with North Korean affairs. Originally a propaganda vehicle that followed the government line on unification policy issues, Naewoe Press became increasingly objective and moderate in tone in the mid-1980s in interpreting political, social, and economic developments in North Korea. Vantage Point, an English-language publication of Naewoe Press, provided in-depth studies of North Korean social, economic, and political developments.

Except for two newspapers (one in Korean and one in English) that the government-owned or controlled and the state television network, ownership of the media was for the most part distinct from political or economic power. One exception was the conservative daily, Joongang Ilbo. Under the close oversight of its owner, the late Samsung Group founder and multimillionaire Lee Byung-chul, the paper and its affiliated TBC television network generally supported the Park government during the 1970s. Its relations with the government became strained after 1980, however, when Chun Doo-hwan forced TBC to merge with KBS. A journalists' strike at Joongang Ilbo in 1989, one of many similar incidents at the major South Korean newspapers, won even greater management and editorial independence.

Most of South Korea's major newspapers derived their financial support from advertising and their affiliation with major publishing houses. The Donga Press, for example, published not only the prestigious daily Donga Ilbo, but also a variety of other periodicals, including a newspaper for children, the general circulation monthly Shin Donga, a women's magazine, and specialized reference books and magazines for students. Throughout the post-war period, the Donga Ilbo has been noted for its opposition sympathies.

South Korea's principal anti-establishment newspaper, The Hankyoreh, began publication in May 1988. It was founded by dissident journalists who were purged by the government in the early 1970s or 1980; many of the paper's reporters and editorial staff left positions in mainstream newspapers to join the new venture. The structure and approach of the paper reflected the founders' view that in the past the South Korean news media had been too easily co-opted by the government. The paper had a human rights department as well as a mass media department to keep an eye on the government's press policy and to critique the ideological and political biases of other newspapers. The paper's nationalism and interest in national reunification were symbolically represented in the logo, which depicted Lake Cheonji at the peak of Baekdu Mountain in North Korea; in the exclusive use of the Korean alphabet; and in the type font in which the paper's name was printed, which dated from a famous Korean publication of the eighteenth century before the country became divided. The paper was printed horizontally, rather than vertically like other Seoul dailies. In other innovations, The Hankyoreh relied on sales revenues, private contributions, and the sale of stock, rather than advertising from major corporations, in line with its claim to be "the first newspaper in the world truly independent of political power and large capital." The newspaper came under increasing government pressure in 1989.

South Korea also had extensive and well-developed visual media. The first Korean film was produced in 1919, and cinemas subsequently were built in the larger cities. The result of the spread of television sets and radios was the dissemination of a homogenized popular culture and the impingement of urban values in rural communities.

=== Current status (1990–today) ===
After decades of state control and heavy censorship, the South Korean press (in print, on television, and online) is experiencing a period of relative freedom. However, the repressive Basic Press Law was repealed in 1987, and since 1990 the television market has expanded significantly. Whereas in 1980 there were only 28 national newspapers, today there are 122. In 2002, satellite broadcasting brought multi-channel commercial television to homes across South Korea. According to most outside observers, political discourse is unrestricted in South Korea; however, persistent concerns are worth noting. The National Security Law allows the government to limit the expression of ideas deemed pro-North Korean or communist; broad interpretations of this statute place a chill on peaceful dissent. In addition, in 2003, President Roh Moo-Hyun brought a libel suit against four of the major national newspapers, and the government has stated that editorials are subject to legal action if they are found to contain falsehoods. Outside observers have criticised pressure tactics used by both the South Korean government and the business community to influence reporting.

Major newspapers include Chosun Ilbo, Donga Ilbo, Joongang Ilbo, and Hankook Ilbo, all published in Seoul. The five nationwide television networks are KBS-1 and KBS-2 (public broadcast), MBC (run as a public organization), EBS (state-funded), and SBS (a commercial broadcaster). Some 70 percent of South Korean households have broadband Internet access, and the online media marketplace is growing rapidly. Popular news Web sites (such as OhMyNews.com) register as many as 15 million visits per day.

Today, much of the news in South Korea is delivered through electronic means via high-speed and wireless internet services.

== Books ==
Baegunhwasang Chorokbuljo Jikjisimcheyojeol (Jikji, Anthology Teachings of Zen Buddhist Priests) is the world's oldest extant movable metal print book. It was published in 1377 (Goryeo Dynasty), 78 years prior to Johannes Gutenberg's "42-Line Bible" printed during the years 1452–1455. In 1446, 'Hunminjeongeum' was published by Sejong, fourth king of 'Joseon Dynasty' and scholars of 'Jiphyunjeon'. This text describes the promulgation of 'Hangul', which is the basis for the modern native Korean alphabet. It is constructed in two parts: 'Hunminjeongeum Yeibon'(the body) and 'Hunminjeongeum Haerebon'(explanations). In the introduction King Sejong revealed that the purpose of creating the Hunminjeongeum. In 1997, it was inscribed into the UNESCO Memory of the World Register.

== Newspapers ==
Published in the late Joseon era, Hansung Sunbo was the first modern newspaper in Korea. It was published in Bakmunkuk, an official printing office, and written in Hanja and published every 10 days. The paper carried both domestic and foreign news and had enlightened opinions.

The Independent was the nation's first newspaper written in Hangeul and the first to be privately owned. Seo Jae-Pil published it in two version: Korean Hangul and English. The Independent made an effort to enlighten people and denounce absurd Joseon officials.

After the 1980s, newspapers received greater freedom, after the Basic Press Law was repealed.

Nowadays, the Chosun Ilbo, Dong-A Ilbo and Joong-Ang Ilbo are the major conservative newspapers; Hankook Ilbo is moderate; Kyunghyang Shinmun and The Hankyoreh are the major liberal newspapers. In South Korea, conservative newspapers are more widely read. Maeil Business Newspaper and Korea Economic Daily are the major business newspapers.

In Korea, as in many other countries, the number of newspaper subscribers is decreasing.

== Magazines ==
=== Weekly magazines ===
1. Jugan Chosun (주간조선) - Conservative
2. Sisa Jeoneol (시사저널) - Centrist
3. Sisa IN (시사인) - Progressive
4. Maegyeong Economy (매경이코노미) - Economic
5. Jugan Kyunghyang (주간경향) - Progressive
6. Hankurye 21 (한겨레21) - Progressive
7. Economist (이코노미스트) - Economic
8. Jugan Dong-a(주간동아) - Conservative
9. Mijeunaeil (미즈내일) - For women
10. Jugan Hankook (주간한국) - Conservative
11. Mirae Hankook (미래한국) - Conservative
12. Hankyung Business (한경비즈니스) - Economic

=== Monthly magazines ===
1. Sindong-a (신동아) - Conservative
2. Wolgan Joongang (월간중앙) - Conservative
3. Wolgan Joseon' (월간조선) - Conservative
4. Inmulgwa Sasang (인물과 사상) - Conservative
5. Yeoseong Dong-a (여성동아) - For women
6. Yeoseong Chosun (여성조선) - For women
7. Wolgan CEO (월간 CEO) - Economic
8. Ikonomi Chosun (이코노미조선) - Economic
9. jonghab Mulga Jeongbo (종합물가정보) - Economic

== Radio networks ==
The first radio broadcasting was JODK by 'Kyungsung Broadcasting' in 1927. Some people regard HLKA by 'Korean Broadcasting system' in 1947 as the first radio broadcasting in Korea. Since 2003, DAB(Digital Audio Broadcasting) or DAR(Digital Audio Radio) services have been used.

=== FM radio ===
- KBS operates 7 channels. KBS Radio 1, KBS Radio 2, KBS Radio 3, KBS 1FM, KBS 2FM, KBS Hanminjok Radio and KBS World Radio.
- MBC: In Korea, MBC Radio is the most popular in general because there are several long-running programs. MBC operates 2 channels: FM4U and Standard FM.
- SBS: Power FM.
- EBS (Educational Broadcasting System)
- CBS is the first commercial radio broadcaster in South Korea. It contains programs about Christianity.
- Other religious programming broadcasters: PBC (Pyeonghwa Broadcasting Corporation, 평화방송), BBS (Buddhism Broadcasting System, 佛敎放送), FEBC (Far East Broadcasting Co., Korea, 極東放送), WBS (원음방송)
- Traffic broadcasters: TBS (Traffic Broadcasting System). They specialize in traffic. Many other stations also provide hourly traffic condition reports, typically for 3 minutes every 57 minutes.

There are many radio stations in Korea, but the channels are not uniquely distinctive. KBS 1FM, KBS 1AM, TBS (Traffic Broadcasting System) are somewhat distinctive. Other channels are usually broadcast according to people's lifestyle.

=== AM radio ===
- SBS Love AM

== TV Networks ==
KORCAD was the first TV station in South Korea, which launched in 1956. In South Korea, terrestrial television broadcasting is common and popular. As terrestrial broadcasters, there are five channels with four television stations:

- KBS includes many channels, including terrestrial channels KBS1 and KBS2, cable network KBS drama, KBS Joy, and KBS World broadcasting overseas.
- MBC is a South Korean free-to-air television channel and is considered the first private company in South Korea launched on 8 August 1969 and owned by Munhwa Broadcasting Corporation.
- EBS is a South Korean educational public broadcaster and radio network covering South Korean territory, and the only major South Korean radio and television network without a separate regional service
- SBS South Korean free-to-air television channel operated by Seoul Broadcasting System. The channel was launched on 9 December 1991.

KBS, MBC, EBS are public broadcasters while SBS is a commercial broadcaster, under a "many public broadcasters" system. It is a unique system; other countries typically have one public broadcaster and many commercial broadcasters.

KBS is funded by public money accrued from a television license fee gathered from all South Korea households with a television set. As of 2010, the fee is ₩2500 (about US$2). Due to low public funds, KBS2 runs commercials. Looking at the ownership of MBC, 70% of it is owned by a government-owned not-for-profit organization (The Foundation of Broadcast Culture), and 30% of it belongs to 'Jeong-su Scholarship Foundation'. Also, because KBS2 and MBC run commercials, there are a lot of controversies on the definition of public broadcasting in South Korea.

Digital television technology emerged recently. Although some television stations have begun broadcasting digital signals, it is not yet widespread as in the United States. The Government of South Korea set December 31, 2012 as the deadline for digital conversion in South Korea. From 2013, South Korea will convert from the analogue broadcasting to the digital broadcasting.(This date coincides with the United Kingdom conversion date.) According to DTV Korea, the rate of digital TV sets in use is about 60% (2010).

== New media ==
=== Internet ===
When it comes to Internet use, South Korea ranked third in the world in 2003. According to statistics from the Korean Ministry of Information and Communication, 78.5% of families own a computer, of which 93.6% use the Internet (2005). Many businesses utilize the Internet in Korea for services such as news, social media, shopping, banking, games, and educational content.

==== Internet journalism ====
Joongang Ilbo developed the first internet news website in Asia in 1995. After the start, almost every daily newspaper made its website. There are also online-only portals like Prussian.

In the mid-2020s, news consumption in South Korea has increasingly shifted toward video-based and short-form platforms. Online portals such as Naver remain important sources of news, although their use for news consumption has declined.

==== Social media ====
As in other countries, social media has become the spotlight in South Korea.

The most notable social media sites in South Korea are KakaoTalk, Naver, and Snow.

A 2024 survey by the Korea Press Foundation found that KakaoTalk was the most widely used social media platform in South Korea, used by 98.9% of respondents, followed by YouTube at 84.9% and Instagram at 38.6%.

===== Social networks =====
An early social networking platform Cyworld was launched in South Korea in 2000. It shut down in 2014. Users could upload their information, mood, pictures, etc. It featured the "following" of other people in a similar vein as Facebook.

===== Micro blogging =====
with its prevalence growing in conjunction with the growing popularity of smartphones in South Korea. 'me2day' and 'yozm' are some other microblogs in South Korean media.

== Regulations ==
The grounds of media regulations are that although broadcasters have freedom of expression, broadcasters have to promote public interest because electromagnetic waves are in the public domain. 'Media law' consist of two structures briefly: business regulation and content related regulation. They mean fairness among the broadcasters, and freedom of expression each.

=== Business regulations ===
Restrictions on market entry
It is the most powerful regulation that decide who will broadcasting business. The grounds of this regulation are largely that: electromagnetic wave is scarce, so all of those who want to operate a broadcasting system cannot do it, and the providers have to set fair to operate a broadcaster (ex, financial power, social experiences etc.) Until just recently large companies (above top 30), newspaper, agency could not operate a broadcasting system because of the independence of media. (It caused problems in Korea in history.) But recently newly revised media law allows it.

- Terrestrial broadcasting, Cable Television broadcasting, satellite broadcasting: government permit
- News channel, General service channel, home-shopping channel: government's approval
- Other program: Resister

Ownership restrictions
It means restriction on the number of broadcasting system that one provider can own. Its purpose is to prevent monopoly or oligopoly on broadcasting. In Summary:

- One provider (person or corporation) can only own one business on the Terrestrial broadcaster and satellite broadcaster.
- Cable system operator and program provider can own more than one broadcaster and transmission line. But, they can be restricted by the government with regards to market share and the number of providers.
- One provider can own terrestrial broadcaster, satellite broadcaster, and cable broadcaster except a combination of terrestrial broadcaster and cable broadcaster.
- On cable broadcasting, one provider can serve system operator, network operator, and program provider but, they can restricted with regard to a market share and the number of providers.

According to newly enactment of Broadcasting Law and Internet Multimedia Broadcasting Business Law from President Lee Myung-Bak's administration, the trend is changing. Newspaper and large company can hold a 10-percent stake in terrestrial broadcaster, a 30-percent stake in cable broadcaster, a 49-percent stakein IPTV or news channel.

=== Content regulation ===
Content within Korean Media is often quite restricted, depending really. They tend to censor out mass amounts of gore and violence (usually depending on what source it's on) and anything that may go against important Laws.

== See also ==
- Communications in South Korea
- International mass media of South Korea
- K-pop
- List of newspapers in South Korea
- Manhwa
- Webtoon
