= Radio jamming in Korea =

Electronic countermeasure

Radio jamming on the Korean Peninsula makes the border region one of the world's busiest places for radio signals. Medium wave jamming is dominant in the area including Seoul and the Korean Demilitarized Zone (DMZ). South Korea jams all radio and television broadcasts from North Korea.

North Korea jams South Korean state broadcasts and foreign shortwave broadcast services which it believes to be against the North Korean regime. These include the Korean language service of the Free North Korea Radio (which originates from US transmitters in Guam), and several other services and broadcasts. It historically jammed Voice of America and Radio Free Asia until both services shut down in 2025.

== Radio jamming in South Korea ==
The South Korean government constantly jams most radio broadcasts from North Korea on medium-wave. According to the National Security Act in South Korea, it is illegal to tune into or publish frequencies of North Korean broadcasts. Yet an ordinary South Korean citizen cannot be easily punished for merely listening to those broadcasts in private. However, public listening and distribution of recordings of an anti-government organisation, namely North Korea, are criminal offences. A listener in the Seoul Metropolitan area (Seoul, Incheon, and Gyeonggi Province) or near the DMZ who tunes across the MW band may hear strange signals on several MW frequencies, mixing with North Korean radio broadcasts. These include 657 kHz (PBS P'yŏngyang), 720 kHz (KCBS Wiwŏn), 819 kHz (KCBS P'yŏngyang) and 882 kHz (KCBS Sinŭiju). It also used to jam transmissions broadcasting from Haeju — for example 1080 kHz (KCBS Haeju) — before transmissions from Haeju were decommissioned.

The South Korean government broadcasts several bizarre-sounding jamming sounds (usually warbling or chugging) in an attempt to prevent their citizens from hearing radio broadcasts from the North. The medium-wave jamming by the South is sometimes too weak to completely block the North Korean broadcasts (the jamming transmission power seems to be between 20 and 50 kilowatts, while the targeted North Korean transmissions are of much higher transmission power—typically over 500 kilowatts). Using a decent quality radio, a listener can sometimes nullify the South Korean jammer by re-orienting the set so its ferrite antenna points in a different direction. On shortwave, jamming is not as severe; only very few North Korean frequencies are slightly jammed. FM jamming is also carried out and it is highly effective in Seoul.

Television jamming in South Korea was widespread before the introduction of Advanced Television Systems Committee (ATSC) and Digital Multimedia Broadcasting (DMB) in South Korea. In Seoul, one could see color bars on particular channels of the VHF band used by (North) Korean Central Television. Now jamming with random signals on those channels is not done, but the channels are used for ATSC and DMB broadcasting. The digital broadcasts provide reliable portable digital television multimedia broadcasts, but cause severe interference with the North Korean analogue signals.

== Radio jamming in North Korea ==
It is illegal for North Koreans to listen to anything other than state-run radio, and all radios sold by state shops in North Korea are fix-tuned to government frequencies, though radios capable of receiving foreign broadcasts can be bought on the black market. North Korea does not jam any commercial South Korean television or radio broadcasts, but some state-owned channels are jammed (namely KBS1 Ch.9, KBS2 Ch.7, KBS Radio 1 711 kHz and 97.3 MHz, KBS 1FM 93.1 MHz, KBS Radio 2 603 kHz/106.1 MHz, KBS 2FM 89.1 MHz KBS Radio 3 1134 kHz/104.9 MHz, KBS Radio Social Education 972/6,015 kHz and Korean Forces Network 96.7 MHz). Before the 2007 closure of South Korean shortwave domestic radio broadcasts, which were often targeted at the North, 3930 kHz KBS Radio 1 and 6015 and 6135 kHz KBS Radio Korean Ethnicity (formerly KBS Radio Social Education) were severely jammed by the North.

The type of the jamming on shortwave is "Jet Plane Noise", which makes it very difficult to hear the radio broadcasts. Since this type of jamming has a wider bandwidth than general broadcasts on shortwave, others near the broadcast aimed by that jamming are also hard to assure clear transmission. North Korea jams South Korea's clandestine shortwave broadcast, Echo of Hope, and the South Korean international shortwave broadcasts of KBS World Radio on 5975 kHz (discontinued as of early 2007) and 7275 kHz. The South Korean national radio channel, KBS Radio 1 on 711 kHz medium-wave is also jammed by the North. Before the June 15th North–South Joint Declaration in 2000, KBS Radio 1 used to deliver certain programmes (merged with then KBS Radio Social Education) which condemned the North Korean regime at midnight. A visitor to coastal areas of the Yellow Sea (covering coastal parts of Gyeonggi Province, Incheon, Chungcheong, and sometimes Jeolla regions) who tunes into 711 kHz (KBS Radio 1 Seoul) may hear strange beeping sounds, which seem to be jamming signals from the North.

KBS Radio Korean Ethnicity no longer targets North Koreans since the North-South Korea Joint Declaration on 15 June 2000. As of 15 August 2007, the radio channel has changed to a special radio broadcast for the Russian Far East and Northeast China, targeting the nearly three million Koreans in China and several hundred thousand Koryo-saram (ethnic Koreans in post-Soviet states).

North Korean jamming of television is relatively unusual, although the North Korean regime once severely jammed a South Korean state-owned television broadcast (KBS 1TV on VHF ch. 9 in Seoul) in the 1970s. Currently there used to be some strange signals on VHF ch. 9 (KBS1) as well as VHF ch. 7 (KBS2) in Seoul which may be North Korean jamming; the two analogue TV channels were discontinued as of 31 December 2012. This jamming is not very effective and a bigger issue for North Koreans attempting to receive Southern TV is the use of different standards. Due to electricity shortages in North Korea, radio jamming activities are not consistent and are sometimes interrupted by power failures.

A group named Free North Korea Radio conducts numerous activities that focus on providing radio broadcasts to North Koreans. The broadcasts often include instructions on methods to leave the country and the group has contact with underground reporters within North Korea. The group primarily consists of numerous North Korean refugees and defectors. In late September 2017, the BBC World Service launched shortwave broadcasts in Korean aimed at the Korean Peninsula from its transmitters in Taiwan and Tashkent, which North Korea quickly began jamming.

In July 2025, South Korean President Lee Jae Myung halted five radio channel and one TV channel broadcasts by the National Intelligence Service to North Korea. In the same year, United States President Donald Trump cut funding for services such as Voice of America and Radio Free Asia. These actions together led the number of hours of programming entering North Korea to fall by roughly 80% since May 2025.

As of 2026, Kenneth Bae seeks to launch a radio channel called "Korea Link", aiming to broadcast directly into North Korea to provide its citizens with news, information, and a connection to the outside world. The plan was announced by Bae's nonprofit organization, New Korea Foundation International, and 45 other South Korean civic and religious groups which formed a joint association.

== See also ==
- Radio jamming
- List of South Korean broadcasting networks
- Radio jamming in China
- Media of North Korea
- Telecommunications in North Korea
- List of radio stations in North Korea
- List of radio stations in South Korea
- Censorship in North Korea
- Propaganda in North Korea
