= KBS FM =

KBS FM may refer to several Korean Broadcasting System FM Radio stations:

- KBS Radio 2, a K-Pop, classical music, and entertainment network
- KBS Classic FM, a classical and oldies music station
- KBS Cool FM, programming older K-pop music from the 1990s
