= Volume Up (radio show) =

South Korean radio show

- Genre: Talk, Music
- Running time: 110 minutes
- Country of origin: South Korea
- Home station: KBS Cool FM/KBS Music (2003~present); KBS Happy FM (1995~2003)
- Hosted by: Hyojung
- Created by: KBS Happy FM/KBS Cool FM
- Written by: Ko Ji-yang; Kim Da-yeon
- Directed by: Oh Gwi-na
- Original release: April 3, 1995 – present
- Website: OH MY GIRL Hyojung's Volume Up Homepage

Volume Up (Korean: 볼륨을 높여요; RR: Bollyumeul nopyeoyo) is a South Korean radio show currently hosted by Hyojung on KBS Cool FM in Seoul and UKBS MUSIC DMB in the provinces, airing every day at 20:00–22:00 (KST). Known as the ruler of the dinner time the show became the highest-rated radio program in its time slot across both AM and FM bandwidths in Seoul. KBS 2FM was South Korea's No. 10 station. Popular for soft music playlist, a short soap opera segment called Lie to Me based on the 2011 TV drama of the same title and Yoo's "My Final Message".

== Host ==
– Current host

Generation #	Host	Period	
Generation #	Host	Debut date	End date
1	Lee Bon	April 3, 1995	October 6, 2004
2	Choi Kang-hee	October 18, 2004	October 8, 2006
3	MayBee	October 9, 2006	April 18, 2010
4	Narsha	April 19, 2010	December 31, 2010
5	Choi Kang-hee	January 1, 2011	October 31, 2011
6	Yoo In-na	November 7, 2011	May 8, 2016
7	Jo Yoon-hee	May 9, 2016	June 2, 2017
Temporary	Choi Kang-hee	June 19, 2017	July 2, 2017
8	Kim Ye-won	July 3, 2017	June 3, 2018
9	Lee Su-hyun	June 4, 2018	January 5, 2020
10	Kang Han-na	January 6, 2020	October 31, 2021
11	Shin Ye-eun	November 1, 2021	July 31, 2022
12	Heize	August 22, 2022	September 3, 2023
13	Chungha	October 2, 2023	October 6, 2024
14	Hyojung	November 25, 2024	-

== See also ==
- Kiss the Radio
- KBS 2FM
