= SBS Power FM =

Contemporary hit radio station in Seoul

HLSQ-FM
- South Korea
- Broadcast area: South Korea
- Frequencies: FM: 107.7 MHz (Seoul, Incheon, Gyeonggi Province); FM: 100.3 MHz (Dongducheon)

Programming
- Language: Korean
- Format: Contemporary hit radio–K-pop

Ownership
- Owner: SBS

History
- First air date: November 14, 1996

Links
- Webcast: Listen Live
- Website: SBS Radio Website

HLSQ-FM, also known as SBS Power FM (Korean: SBS 파워FM), is a K-pop music radio station of the Seoul Broadcasting System. The station is heard nationwide via syndication with local FM stations in Korea via HLDG-FM in Busan, HLDE-FM in Daegu, HLDH-FM in Gwangju, HLDF-FM in Daejeon, HLDP-FM in Ulsan, HLDQ-FM in Jeonju, HLDR-FM in Cheongju, HLCG-FM in Gangwon, HLQC-FM in Jeju and HLKJ-FM in Seogwipo.

== History ==
- October 1996: Seoul Broadcasting System made plans for an FM radio station to complement HLSQ.
- October 30, 1996: Seoul Broadcasting System started FM test broadcast.
- November 14, 1996: SBS Power FM Launched.
- 2003: SBS Regional FM Network completed.
- 2004: Started South Korea's first internet radio broadcast via Gorealra PC application.
- 2005: Began South Korea's first internet visual radio (BORA) broadcast.
- November 9, 2010: SBS Power FM Dongducheon relay station started broadcasting.
- 2012: Topped rating rank for the first half of the year.
- November 14, 2016: The station celebrated its 20th anniversary.

== Stations ==
=== Seoul, Incheon, and Gyeonggi Province ===
Callsign	Frequency	Power (kW)
HLSQ-FM	FM 107.7MHz	10kW

=== Other provinces ===
- Dongducheon via Dongducheon SBS on FM 100.3MHz
- Gangwon via HLCG-FM on FM 103.1MHz, FM 105.1MHz, FM 106.1MHz, FM 99.3MHz and FM 88.3MHz
- Daejeon Chungnam Sejong via HLDF-FM on FM 95.7MHz and FM 96.5MHz
- Cheongju via HLDR-FM on FM 101.5MHz, FM 97.9MHz and FM 102.7MHz
- Jeonju via HLDQ-FM on FM 90.1MHz
- Gwangju Jeonnam via HLDH-FM on FM 101.1MHz and FM 96.7MHz
- Daegu Gyeongbuk via HLDE-FM on FM 99.3MHz, FM 99.7MHz and FM 106.5MHz
- Busan Gyeongnam via HLDG-FM on FM 99.9MHz, FM 96.3MHz, FM 102.5MHz, FM 105.5MHz and FM 106.7MHz
- Ulsan via HLDP-FM on FM 92.3MHz
- Jeju via HLQC-FM on FM 101.5MHz
- Seogwipo via HLKJ-FM on FM 98.5MHz
- Hallim via HLQC-FM on FM 95.9MHz

== Programs ==
- Lee In-kwon's Fun Fun Today^^
- Kim Young-chul's Power FM^
- Bong Tae-gyu's Beautiful Morning^^
- Jang Ye-won's Cinetown^^
- 12 O'Clock with Joo Hyun-young^
- Jeong Chan-woo and Kim Tae-gyun's CulTwo Show^
- Hwang Jae Sung's King's Power^^
- Park So-Hyeon's Love Game^^
- Wendy's Youngstreet^^
- Bae Sung-jae's TEN^^
- DinDin's Music High^^
- After Club^^

^ Heard nationwide through regional affiliates
^^ Heard through selected regional affiliates

== Trivia ==
- SBS Power FM is South Korea's top-rated FM station. In the latest 2020 first quarter radio survey, SBS Power FM topped the ranking followed by TBS FM at number 2, CBS Music FM at number 3, MBC FM4U at number 4, KBS Radio 2 at number 5 and the sister Love FM at number 6.
- Devoted SBS Power FM listeners mostly in their 20s to 30s are called Everlasting because the station is the only one to air solely K-pop music (unlike KBS Cool FM and MBC FM4U — the former of which airs mostly trot at some shows whereas the latter also airs foreign music at some timeslots) due to the popularity of the station the fans wants the FM station to last forever.

== Logo song ==
The logo song is the short jargon placed in-between some ads during program broadcasting, and also to start and to end every program.

Korean lyrics	English translation	Times in use	Notes
SBS~ 파워 FM~	SBS~ Power FM~	1995–2000, 2016–present	2016 version is new version sung by IU (singer)
파워~ FM!	Power~ FM!	2000–present	-
I'VE GOT THE POWER~ Yeah~ I'VE GOT THE POWER~ SBS 파워 FM!	I've got the power~ Yeah~ I've got the power~ SBS Power FM!	2016–present	sung by Kim Yeon-woo
그대와 발을 맞춰 나란히~ 행복을 만나러 가는 길(행복해~) 기분 좋은 콧노래가 랄랄라~ 그대와 함께 언제나~ (SBS~) 파워 FM~	Standing side-by-side with you~ in the road to find happiness (I'm happy~) Humming in joy lalala~ Anytime I'm with you~ (SBS~) Power FM~	2016–present	-
대한민국 1등 Radio~ 107.7 SBS~ 파워 FM!	South Korea's Number 1 Radio~ 107.7 SBS~ Power FM!	2017–present	"107.7" is sung in English

== 20th Anniversary Song Project ==
Title	Artist	Release date	Peak chart positions	Sales (DL)
Title	Artist	Release date	KOR Gaon	Sales (DL)
"That's All" (Korean: 그뿐야)	Park So-hyun x Leo (VIXX)	20 September 2016	TBA	KOR: TBA
"—" denotes releases that did not chart or were not released in that region.

== See also ==
- KBS Radio 3
- SBS Love FM
