= Kyung-In Broadcasting =

South Korean radio station

Kyung-In Broadcasting (경인방송) is a South Korean radio station, formerly a television station (iTV), serving the metropolitan area of Incheon, which is adjacent to Seoul. The successor of iFM Kyung-in Broadcasting is OBS Gyeongi TV. iTV closed because the television part (main) were struggling with financial issues and because the Korean Broadcasting Commission rejected their broadcasting renewal, which led to it being closed on December 31, 2004.

== History ==
iTV began television broadcasting at noon on 11 October 1997 (initially scheduled for 1 September) as iTV Incheon Broadcasting (iTV 인천방송). It was the largest of the private broadcasters outside of SBS at the time. Prior to the first broadcast, the building at Hagik-dong was formally inaugurated. The launch of iTV occurred during the second wave of private local broadcasters, which also saw the expansion of the SBS network.

Although iTV operated as an independent television station, it was the first channel to air a video journalist program, Real TV, which was broadcast at 8:30 p.m. The program employed twenty producers. iTV struck a deal to carry MLB matches in 1998; in 2000, those rights returned to MBC.

On 1 November 2000, iTV was renamed Kyung-In Broadcasting and shifted from UHF channel 21 to VHF channel 4.

However, iTV's television division struggled with poor management, leading the government to decline the renewal of its broadcasting license. As a result, on 21 December 2004, the station was forced to shut down on 31 December, the day its license expired. It became the first media outlet in Korea to close in 24 years, since several outlets, most notably the Tongyang Broadcasting Corporation, had been shut down due to media rationing under Chun Doo-hwan's regime. Most of its entertainment archives are now held at Inet TV, a channel specialized primarily in trot music.

In March 2005, iTV resumed radio broadcasting. The following year, the station signed a co-operation agreement with Qingdao Television.

On 19 November 2013, iFM and OBS Gyeongin TV signed a memorandum of understanding to enhance practical co-operation between the two stations. A second memorandum of understanding was signed on 30 January 2018, allowing both stations to use the Korean name Kyung-in Broadcasting.

Following the closure of Gyeonggi Broadcasting, iFM applied for a license in November 2021 to operate in KFM's former coverage area.
