= Busan Munhwa Broadcasting Corporation =

TV and radio station in South Korea

Busan MBC FM4U (HLKU-FM)
- Busan; South Korea
- Broadcast area: Busan
- Frequency: 95.9 Mhz

Programming
- Language: Korean
- Affiliations: MBC FM4U

Ownership
- Owner: MBC

History
- Founded: April 15, 1959
- First air date: May 15, 1959
- Former frequencies: 1161 kHz

Technical information
- Licensing authority: KCC

The Busan Munhwa Broadcasting Corporation (Korean: 부산문화방송) is MBC's local unit for the city of Busan. The first private radio station in South Korea (older than the main MBC station by two years), the branch operates radio (two stations) and television under the HLKU callsign.

Busan Munhwa Broadcasting Corporation (HLKU-DTV)
- Busan; South Korea
- City: Busan
- Channels: Digital: 17 (UHF); Virtual: 11

Programming
- Language: Korean
- Affiliations: 11.1: MBC

Ownership
- Owner: MBC

History
- First air date: January 24, 1970
- Former channel numbers: Analog: 12 (VHF, 1970–1972); 11 (VHF, 1972–2012)

Technical information
- Licensing authority: KCC
- Power: 2,500 watts
- Translator(s): UHF 28 (Mandeok); UHF 32 (Jangsan); UHF 49 (Cheonmasan)

Links
- Website: https://busanmbc.co.kr/

== History ==
The company was established on October 20, 1958. On April 15, 1959, the Munhwa Broadcasting Corporation opened, creating a network system in the radio sector for the first time. The station's name was chosen in order to protect local culture from Japanese influence, considering Busan's geographical location, as well as the easy reception of Japanese radio signals. In November 1959, it broadcast the first commercial jingle on Korean radio, for Jinro Soju, the lyrics of which were composed by the station's boss Heo Young-cheol. The jingle became a success, especially among children, even though this raised concerns about potential underage alcohol consumption.

On June 30, 1962, when the founder of Munhwa Broadcasting Corporation was taken away by the Central Intelligence Agency right after the May 16 military coup, its ownership was effectively taken away and transferred to the May 16 Scholarship Association (now the Jeongsu Scholarship Association). On March 5, 1965, the company name was changed to Busan Cultural Broadcasting Corporation. In 1967, it signed a memorandum of understanding with RKB Mainichi Broadcasting, a radio and television station based in Fukuoka.

Busan MBC conducted test television broadcasts on December 30, 1969, and started regular broadcasts on January 25, 1970, under the HLAD-TV callsign. The station broadcast on VHF channel 12, with an output of 2 kW visual and 500W aural, as well as cameras supplied by British company Pye. It moved to channel 11 on September 30, 1972.

Busan MBC broadcast from the Kukje Building until 1997, which was sold to a construction company for it to be refurbished as a hotel in 2017.

It was one of the fourteen MBC branches outside Seoul that was affected by a fall in profits between 2019 and 2021. It had lost 5.8 billion won in 2021 alone.

Busan MBC signed an MoU with Fantagio on July 31, 2024 concerning program production.
