= Gyeonggi Broadcasting Corporation =

South Korean radio company

Gyeonggi Broadcasting Corporation (KFM 99.9; callsign HLDS-FM; Korean: 경기방송; Hanja: 京畿放送) is a broadcasting company and former radio station headquartered in Suwon, Gyeonggi, South Korea. It was established on January 15, 1997, then launched on December 2, 1997. It was an FM radio broadcaster in Seoul, Incheon, and Gyeonggi Province. Its tele number was KFM frequency 99.9 MHz, over power from 5 kW if similar broadcast network at KBS, MBC, SBS (Korea).

The station installed an advertising billboard in Paju in 2006, which was criticized as illegal advertising.

On the midnight of March 30, 2020, KFM 99.9 MHz ceased operations, after 23 years of radio broadcasting. The last program before closing down was 8090 Concert.

== See also ==
- KBS Classic FM
- KBS Cool FM
- Gugak FM
