= No Cut News =

South Korean news company

- Founded: November 2003; 22 years ago

No Cut News (Korean: 노컷뉴스) is a daily newspaper run by South Korea's Christian Broadcasting System. Since November 2003, they have had a partnership with Central and Local News Media Networks(Over 30) for sharing of articles and photo content. In March 2006, they began printing a separate edition for North America, in competition with the Christian Times.

== See also ==
- Christian Broadcasting System
