= Inet TV =

Korean television channel

- Type: Music television
- Country: South Korea
- Headquarters: 34 Yangjaecheon-ro 11-gil, Seocho District, Seoul, South Korea

Programming
- Language(s): Korean

History
- Founded: October 1, 2002; 22 years ago

Availability

Streaming media
- KT ENA: 99
- B TV: 202
- Genie TV: 92
- LG U+TV: 150

Inet-TV (아이넷TV) is a South Korean television channel created in October 2002. It specializes in Korean adult music which includes Korean trot music as well as its revival among younger generations.

== History ==
The channel was set up in 2002 by Park Jun-hee, at a time when trot was badly seen in Korean society, with its television presence being limited to KBS Music Stage. The channel started airing programs from iTV Kyung-In Broadcasting, which, until 2004, operated a TV station. In 2005, it started producing its own content, but its ratings were still low.

In 2015, the channel announced that it would make a second season of iTV's Dangerous Invitation.

In January 2016, it introduced a new program, Inet Golden Show. As of January 2020, its archives consisted of 50,000 files, including original programming, acquired programming and a substantial amount of iTV's archives. The channel is mostly self-sustainable, with most of its programming being catered to the trot genre, accumulating about 500 million won per program.

== Channel number (Korea) ==
- skylife= 99
- sk b TV= 202
- lg u+ TV= 150
- kt olleh TV= 92
