= Jeju International Broadcasting System =

- Hangul: 제주방송
- Hanja: 濟州放送
- RR: Jeju bangsong
- MR: Cheju pangsong

Jeju International Broadcasting System (Korean: 제주방송) or JIBS is a radio and TV station that is affiliated with the SBS Network, in Jeju Province, South Korea, and it was originally established on April 10, 1994, though it had started its demo emissions, and then later, it had therefore begun its test transmissions on December 7, 2001, as well as it soon commences its official broadcasts from May 31, 2002.

== Stations ==
HLKJ-DTV
- Jeju Province; South Korea
- City: Jeju City
- Channels: Digital: 33; Virtual: 6
- Branding: JIBS Television

Programming
- Affiliations: SBS

Ownership
- Owner: Jeju International Broadcasting System

History
- First air date: May 31, 2002
- Call sign meaning: HL; Korea; Jeju

Technical information
- Licensing authority: KCC

Links
- Website: http://www.jibs.co.kr/

HLQC-FM
- Jeju City; South Korea
- Broadcast area: Jeju Province
- Frequency: FM 101.5 MHz
- Branding: JIBS New Power FM

Programming
- Format: Top 40 Mainstream/K-Pop
- Affiliations: SBS Power FM

Ownership
- Owner: Jeju International Broadcasting System

History
- First air date: January 4, 2003

Technical information
- Class: all
- Power: 3kW (Jeju City); 1kW (Seogwipo)
- Translators: FM 98.5 MHz (Seogwipo); FM 95.9 MHz (Hallim)

- Television
  - Channel - Ch. 33 (LCN 6-1)
  - Launched - May 31, 2002
  - Affiliated to - SBS
  - Call Sign - HLKJ-DTV
- FM radio (New Power FM)
  - Frequency - FM 101.5 MHz (Jeju City), FM 98.5 MHz (Seogwipo City), FM 95.9 MHz (Hallim)
  - Launched - January 4, 2003
  - Affiliated to - SBS
  - Call Sign - HLQC-FM

== History ==
The station was awarded a television license from the Ministry of Communications and Information (the current Ministry of Science and ICT) on March 29, 2002. The station was granted UHF channel 22 for Jeju City and was planning to set up a relay on channel 21 for Seogwipo. Broadcasts started on May 31, 2002, the day the 2002 FIFA World Cup kicked off.

== Controversies ==
On March 30, 2024, JIBS News 8 presenter Jo Chang-beom mispronounced the phrase "have started sending election campaign materials" during coverage of the then-upcoming general elections. The video went viral, but was quickly deleted by the station as some comments referred to the presenter as being drunk. JIBS pledged to work harder in order to prevent a similar incident from happening. As consequence of the removal of the video, the entire edition from that day was also removed from its website and social media pages.

On March 4, 2025, the edition became the target of a KOCSC complaint. JIBS said that Jo had consumed alcoholic beverages during his lunch earlier in the day of the bulletin and, after that started feeling ill. He was suspended for three months.

== See also ==
- SBS (Korea)
