= KBS Music =

South Korean radio station

KBS MUSIC is a Korean radio station tuned nationwide via a Digital Multimedia Broadcasting audio channel.

- Seoul : CH 12B
- Chuncheon : CH 13B
- Daejeon/Cheongju : CH 11B
- Gwangju/Jeonju: CH 12B/CH 8B/CH 7B
- Daegu : CH 7B/CH 9B
- Busan/Ulsan : CH 12B/CH 9B
- Jeju : CH 13B/CH 8B
