= MBC Standard FM =

South Korean radio station

- South Korea
- Broadcast area: South Korea
- Frequency: FM: 95.9 MHz

Programming
- Format: Complex radio channel

Ownership
- Owner: MBC

History
- First air date: 1987 (FM)

Links
- Webcast: Listen Live

MBC Standard FM (Hangul: MBC 표준FM) is a full service (news, current affairs, sports, entertainment) radio station of the Munhwa Broadcasting Corporation.

== History ==
The MBC Standard FM network has its origins on the Busan Munhwa Broadcasting Corporation in 1959. However, the Seoul station didn't start operating until 2 December 1961, initially as an independent operation from the one in Busan (at the time known as Korean Munhwa Broadcasting Corporation), under the callsign HLKV. It was the first commercial radio station in Seoul.

On 8 November 2022, MBC suspended its AM signals for six months to prepare for the end of AM radio. In May 2024, MBC Standard FM announced the end of the Single Bungle Show from 2 June, which had been airing continuously since 1973. A trot music program took its place the following day.

== Availability ==
=== Seoul, Incheon, Gyeonggi Province ===
Callsign	Frequency	Power (kW)	Transmitter Location
HLKV-SFM	95.9 MHz	10 kW	Gwanaksan
HLKV-SFM	104.1 MHz	100W	Dongducheon

=== Affiliate stations ===
- Chuncheon MBC - FM 92.3, 88.9 MHz
- Wonju MBC - FM 92.7, 102.5 MHz
- MBC Gangwon Yeongdong Gangneung - AM 1287, FM 96.3, 100.7, 99.7 MHz
- MBC Gangwon Yeongdong Samcheok - FM 93.1, 101.5 MHz
- Daejeon MBC - FM 92.5, 91.3, 92.5, 93.7 MHz
- MBC Chungbuk Cheongju - FM 107.1, 96.3 MHz
- MBC Chungbuk Chungju FM 96.1, 94.7, 94.1 MHz
- Jeonju MBC - AM 855 kHz, FM 101.7, 94.3 MHz
- Gwangju MBC - AM 819 kHz, FM 93.9, 101.9 MHz
- Mokpo MBC - FM 89.1 MHz
- Yeosu MBC - FM 100.3, 107.1, 101.3 MHz
- Daegu MBC - FM 96.5, 98.7, 100.3 MHz
- Busan MBC - FM 95.9, 106.5 MHz
- Ulsan MBC - FM 97.5 MHz
- MBC KyeongNam Changwon - FM 98.9, 96.7 MHz
- MBC KyeongNam JinJu - FM 91.1, 93.5 MHz
- Jeju MBC - FM 97.9, 97.1, 106.5 MHz

== See also ==
- SBS TV
- Channel A
