= Traffic Broadcasting System =

South Korean television and radio network

Traffic Broadcasting System (TBS) 교통방송
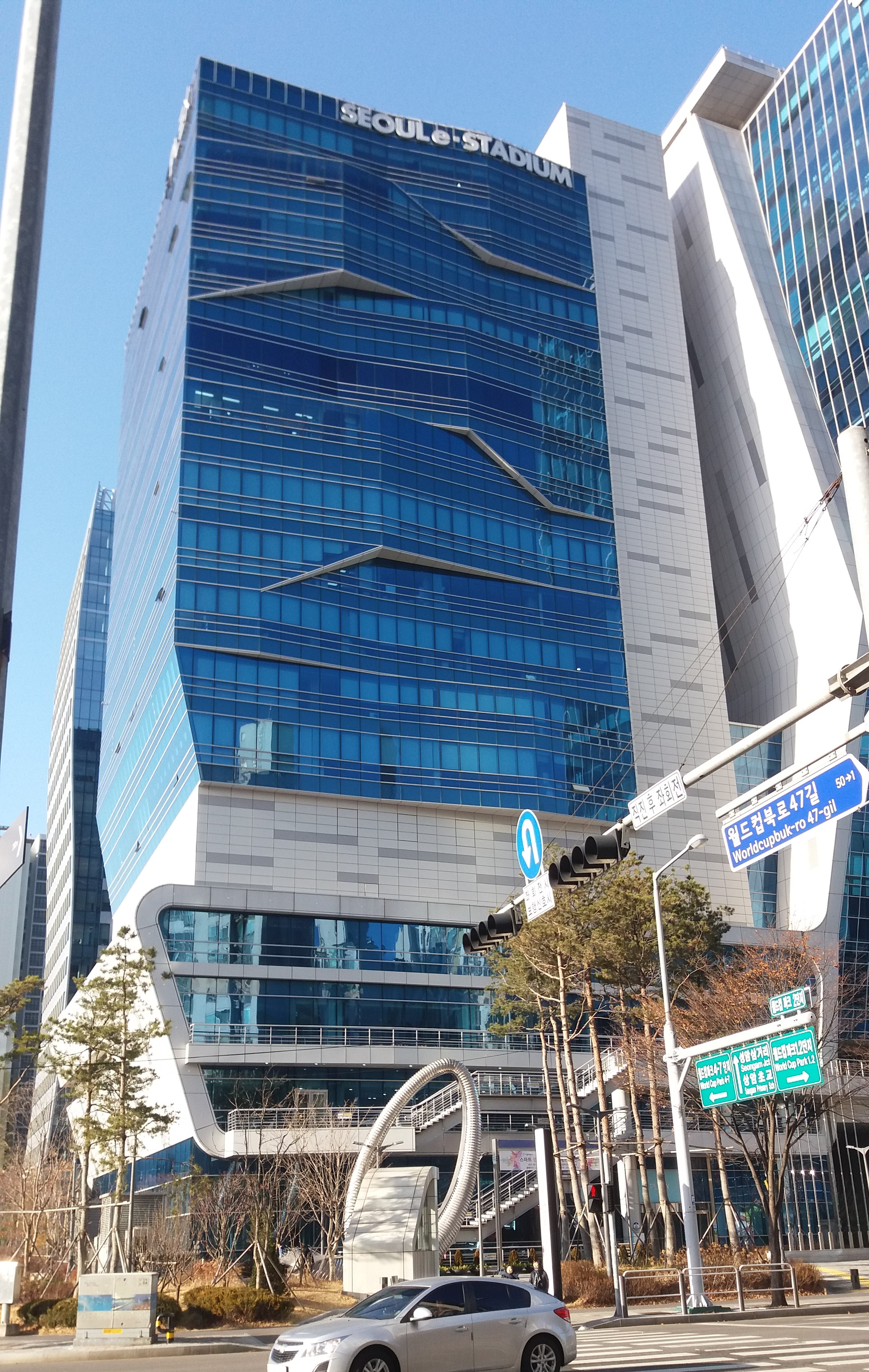
- Type: Broadcast radio and television
- Country: South Korea
- Availability: National; International
- Owner: Seoul Metropolitan Government
- Key people: Jeong Chan-Hyeong President
- Launch date: 1990 (Radio); 2005 (Cable television & DMB)
- Official website: Official Website

Korean name
- Hangul: 교통방송
- Hanja: 交通放送
- RR: Gyotong bangsong
- MR: Kyot'ong pangsong

Traffic Broadcasting System (TBS; Korean: 교통방송) is a South Korean television and radio network about traffic in Seoul Capital Area.

As of 2022, the radio station received 70% of its funding from the Seoul Metropolitan Government.

The television station broadcasts general news, information, documentaries, and sports about Seoul. K League football matches with FC Seoul are particularly popular among viewers.

== See also ==
- KBS Radio 1
- KBS Radio 2
- EBS FM
- MBC FM4U
- EBS 1TV
- Far East Broadcasting Company
