= MBC FM4U =

South Korea radio station

- South Korea
- Broadcast area: South Korea

Programming
- Format: K-pop, Pop music, Classical music, Entertainment

Ownership
- Owner: MBC

History
- First air date: 19 September 1971

Links
- Webcast: MBC Mini
- Website: www.imbc.com/broad/radio

MBC FM4U is a K-pop, Pop music, Classical music and Entertainment station from Munhwa Broadcasting Corporation. Launched on September 19, 1971 it was South Korea's second FM station, with TBC Radio (Now KBS Cool FM) being first and KBS Stereo FM (now KBS Classic FM) being third.

== Availability ==
=== Seoul, Incheon, Gyeonggi Province ===
Callsign	Frequency	Power (kW)	Transmitter Location
HLKV-FM	FM 91.9MHz	10kW	Gwanaksan

=== Other Provinces ===
- Chuncheon MBC FM4U : FM 94.5, 98.3 MHz
- Wonju MBC FM4U : FM 98.9 MHz
- MBC Gangwon Yeongdong (Gangneung) FM4U : FM 94.3, 90.7, 96.9 MHz
- MBC Gangwon Yeongdong (Samcheok) FM4U : FM 98.1, 99.9 MHz
- Daejeon MBC FM4U : FM 97.5 MHz
- MBC Chungbuk FM4U (Cheongju) : FM 99.7 MHz
- MBC Chungbuk FM4U (Chungju) : FM 88.7 MHz
- Jeonju MBC FM4U : FM 99.1 MHz
- Gwangju MBC FM4U : FM 91.5, 95.1 MHz
- Mokpo MBC FM4U : FM 102.3 MHz
- Yeosu MBC FM4U : FM 98.3 MHz
- Daegu MBC FM4U : FM 95.3 MHz
- Andong MBC FM4U : FM 91.3 MHz
- Pohang MBC FM4U : FM 97.9, 94.9, 90.9 MHz
- Busan MBC FM4U : FM 88.9 MHz
- Ulsan MBC FM4U : FM 98.7 MHz
- MBC Gyeongnam FM4U (Jinju) : FM 97.7, 96.1 MHz
- MBC Gyeongnam FM4U (Changwon) : FM 100.5 MHz
- Jeju MBC FM4U : FM 90.1, 102.9, 102.5 MHz

== History ==
- September 19, 1971 - MBC FM Launched. (call sign HLKV-FM, FM frequency 91.9 MHz, Power 1 kW)
- 1983 - MBC-FM boosted power. (1 kW → 10 kW)
- 1986 - MBC-FM Started Nationwide Broadcast.
- 1988 - Partial 24 hours broadcasting started. (Monday to Saturday 24 hours, Sunday 21 hours)
- 1995 - MBC FM Started 24 hours Broadcasting.
- 2001 - Renamed as MBC FM4U.
- 2002 - Digital tapeless system conversion completed.
- August 3, 2014 - MBC FM4U broadcasting in Yeouido Island MBC ended. (The building will be torn down soon.)
- August 4, 2014 - MBC FM4U broadcasting in Sang-am dong MBC started.

== Programmes and schedules ==
- The Morning that opens the World
- Good Morning FM
- Today Morning
- Hello this is Lee Moon-sae
- Kim Shin-young's Request songs of hope at noon
- Ahn Young-mi's 2 O'Clock Date
- Perfect day with Lee Sang-soon
- Bae Cheol-soo's Music Camp
- Kim Eana's Starry Night
- Close Friend
- Idol Radio
- Spoiler King

== See also ==
- KBS Radio 1
- KBS Radio 2
- EBS FM
- CBS Music FM
- Traffic Broadcasting System
- EBS 1TV
- Far East Broadcasting Company
