= Christian Broadcasting System =

South Korean broadcaster

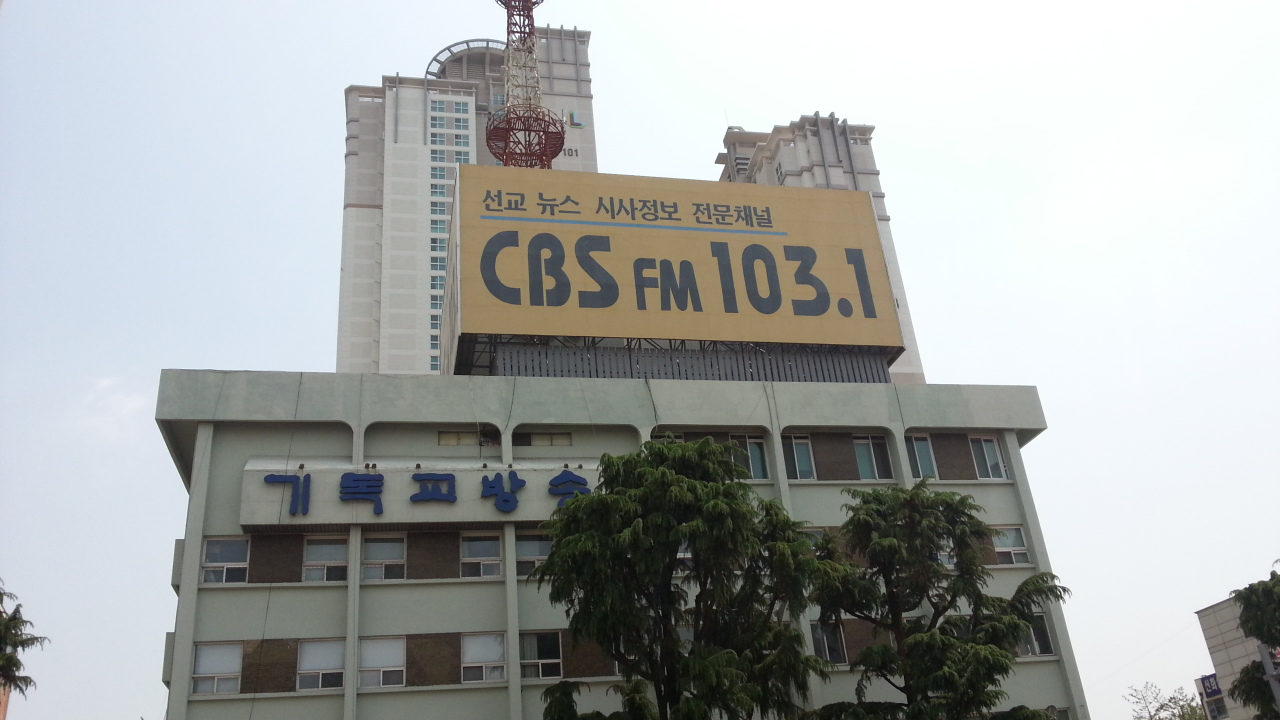
- Christian Broadcasting System in Daegu
- Type: Radio network (1995–present); Television network (2002–present)
- Country: South Korea
- Founded: April 2, 1954; 72 years ago
- Headquarters: Mokdong
- Broadcast area: South Korea, United States
- Key people: Kim Jin-oh (President)
- Launch date: Radio: December 15, 1995; 30 years ago; Television: March 1, 2002; 24 years ago
- Official website: www.cbs.co.kr
- Subsidiary: No Cut News

The Christian Broadcasting System (CBS) is a South Korean religious radio and television network. It airs both religious and non religious programming.

== History ==
CBS commenced broadcasting on December 15, 1954, as a radio station (with the call sign HLKY) for the purpose of establishing the first religious missionary network in Korea. The network was known for its contributions to human rights, democratization of economy, and for its political stance against the authoritarian regimes of the 1960s to the 1980s. As a result, the network was affected by the Policy for Merger and Abolition of the Press, which limited press freedom in the country.

In 1992, the network moved its headquarters to from Jongno to Mok-dong.

In 1995, the station opened CBS Music FM.

In 1998, CBS launched another radio station, CBS Pyojun FM.

In 2002, CBS TV was launched. From 2005, CBS commenced international broadcasting, with its programs available in the United States.

== See also ==
- No Cut News, a daily newspaper owned by the network
