= KBS Hanminjok Radio =

South Korean propaganda radio station

South Korea
- Broadcast area: South Korea, North Korea, China, Japan, Australia, Primorsky Krai
- Frequencies: HLCA: AM 972 kHz, SW 6015 kHz; HLSR: AM 1170 kHz

Programming
- Format: Propaganda

Ownership
- Owner: KBS
- Sister stations: KBS Radio 1, KBS Radio 2, KBS Radio 3, KBS Classic FM, KBS Cool FM

History
- First air date: August 15, 1972

Links
- Webcast: Listen Live

KBS Hanminjok Radio (Korean: KBS 한민족방송) is a South Korean anti-communist propaganda radio channel of the Korean Broadcasting System. It is the only channel that does not have FM frequency in South Korea. Until 2007, it was called as KBS Social Education Radio (Korean: KBS 사회교육방송). It has two channels, but Hanminjok 2 Radio, the second channel usually relays the same program with Hanminjok 1 Radio.

Until the mid-2000s, it broadcast content criticizing the North Korean system, but halted them after Inter-Korean summits. After its name was changed, the audience has been expanded not only to North Koreans but also to Hanminjok (Koreans) living in China, Japan, Taiwan and Russia.

== Frequency and air time ==
Air time	Station	Callsign	Frequency	Power	Transmitter location
04:00 - 00:00 UTC	Hanminjok 1	HLCA	AM 972 kHz	750 kW Day, 1500 kW Night	Dangjin
04:00 - 00:00 UTC	Hanminjok 1	HLCA	SW 6.015 MHz	100 kW	Hwaseong
10:00 - 04:00 UTC	Hanminjok 2	HLSR	AM 1170 kHz	500 kW	Gimje

== See also ==
- Propaganda in South Korea
- KBS World Radio
