= KBS Radio 1 =

South Korea radio station

- South Korea
- Frequencies: HLKA: AM 711 kHz ...more HLKA-SFM: FM: 97.3 MHz ...more

Programming
- Language: Korean
- Format: News, Talk, Culture, Drama, Sports

Ownership
- Owner: KBS
- Sister stations: KBS Radio 2, KBS Radio 3, KBS Classic FM, KBS Cool FM, KBS Hanminjok Radio

History
- First air date: HLKA: February 16, 1927; 99 years ago (as JODK); 1947; 79 years ago (as HLKA); HLKA-SFM: December 1, 1980; 45 years ago
- Call sign meaning: KA for "Korea"

Links
- Webcast: Listen Live

KBS Radio 1 (Korean: KBS 제1라디오) is a South Korean news, talk, sports, Drama and cultural radio channel of the Korean Broadcasting System. The network has a 24-hour broadcast dedicated to today's events reflecting Koreans.

Radio 1's programs are heard nationwide; national shows originate from Seoul, with local stations providing an amount of regional programming (including local identification at the top of the hour and at 4:53 am daily) to its audience.

== Stations ==
=== Seoul, Incheon, Gyeonggi Province ===
Callsign	Frequency	Power	Transmitter location
HLKA-AM	AM 711 kHz	500 kW	Sorae
HLKA-SFM	FM 97.3 MHz	10 kW	Gwanaksan

=== In other provinces ===
- Chuncheon : FM 99.5 MHz, AM 657 kHz
- Wonju : FM 97.1 MHz, FM 95.5 MHz, AM 1152 kHz
- Gangneung : FM 98.9 MHz, AM 864 kHz
- Daejeon : FM 94.7 MHz, AM 882 kHz
- Cheongju : FM 89.3 MHz, AM 1062 kHz
- Chungju : FM 92.1 MHz, 103.3 MHz, FM 90.7 MHz
- Jeonju : FM 96.9 MHz, AM 567 kHz
- Gwangju : FM 90.5 MHz, AM 747 kHz
- Mokpo : FM 105.9 MHz, AM 1467 kHz
- Suncheon : FM 95.7 MHz, AM 630 kHz
- Daegu : FM 101.3 MHz, AM 738 kHz
- Gimcheon : FM 90.7 MHz
- Andong : FM 90.5 MHz, AM 963 kHz
- Pohang : FM 95.9 MHz, AM 1035 kHz
- Busan : FM 103.7 MHz, AM 891 kHz
- Ulsan : FM 90.7 MHz, AM 1449 kHz
- Changwon : FM 91.7 MHz, AM 1278 kHz
- Jinju : FM 90.3 MHz, AM 1098 kHz
- Jeju : FM 99.1 MHz, AM 963 kHz

== Brief history ==
Radio 1 was originally launched as Kyeongseong Broadcasting Corporation (JODK) by the Japanese government in Korea on February 16, 1927, and later adopted the callsign HLKA in 1947 after South Korea got the HL callsign block from the International Telecommunication Union. In 1965 the name was changed to KBS Radio 1.

== See also ==
- KBS Radio 2
- EBS FM
- MBC FM4U
- CBS Music FM
- Traffic Broadcasting System
- EBS 1TV
- Far East Broadcasting Company
