= SBS Love FM =

SBS Love FM (HLSQ-SFM)
- South Korea
- Broadcast area: South Korea
- Frequencies: FM: 103.5 MHz (Seoul, Incheon, Gyeonggi Province); FM: 98.3 MHz (Icheon)

Programming
- Format: Full Service

Ownership
- Owner: SBS

History
- First air date: January 1, 1999 (FM)

Links
- Webcast: Listen Live
- Website: SBS Radio Website

SBS Love FM (Hangul : SBS 러브FM also known as SBS Love FM) is a full service (news, current affairs, entertainment, trot music, K-Pop music and Game show) radio station of the Seoul Broadcasting System. The station is heard nationwide via syndication with only one local FM station in Korea via HLDG-SFM in Busan.

== History ==
- 1990-11-14 : Seoul Broadcasting System Co. Ltd. was established. SBS took over the frequency from KBS Radio Seoul on March 11, 1991, delivering a test broadcast until regular broadcasts started on March 20.
- 1991-03-20 : SBS AM launched.
- 1993-07-01 : SBS enhanced its AM transmitting station.
- 1993-07-18 : SBS AM started South Korea's first stereo AM Broadcast.
- 1999-01-01 : SBS Love FM launched.
- 2004 : Started South Korea's first internet radio broadcast via Gorealra PC application.
- 2005 : Started South Korea's first internet visual radio (BORA) broadcast.
- 2008-07-28 : Renamed as SBS Love FM.
- 2015-06-30 : SBS Love FM Icheon relay station started broadcasting.
- 2016-05-10 : SBS Regional Standard-FM Network's first establish: KNN.
- 2017-05-10 : KNN Love FM Yangsan Gijang Jeonggwan relay station started broadcasting.
- 2017-10-30 : KNN Love FM Changwon Gimhae Geoje relay station started broadcasting.
- 2018-03-21 : KNN Love FM Jinju Gimhae Geoje relay station started broadcasting.

== Programs ==
- Go Hyun-joon's News Briefing
- Kim Tae-hyun's Politics Show
- Lee Sook-young's Love FM
- Weekend Love FM with Choi Young-ju
- Park Yeon-mi's Lump Sum Research Institute
- Yoon Min-sang's Hungry Radio
- SBS Afternoon General News
- Your afternoon with Jungyup
- Life is a audition
- SBS News Direct (main flagship newscast)
- DJ Raffy's Drive Music
- Evening Breeze with Kim Chang-wan
- Kim Yoon-sang's Music Tonight
- A night filled with music with Park Eun-kyung
- SBS News Update
- SBS Traffic Report
- KBO on Love FM (Baseball coverage)
- League of Legends on Love FM (ESports Coverage)

== Stations ==
=== Seoul, Incheon, Gyeonggi Province ===
Callsign	Frequency	Power (kW)
HLSQ-SFM	FM 103.5 MHz	10

=== Other Provinces ===
- Icheon via Icheon SBS on FM 98.3 MHz.
- Busan and Gyeongnam via HLDG-SFM on FM 105.7 MHz, FM 88.5 MHz, FM 89.5 MHz and FM 90.9 MHz, FM 98.7 MHz.

== See also ==
- KBS Radio 3
- SBS Power FM
