= KBS World Radio =

International broadcaster of South Korea

Coordinates: 35°50′00″N 126°50′00″E

- Type: Radio network
- Country: South Korea
- Availability: International
- Owner: KBS
- Launch date: 15 August 1953
- Former names: The Voice of Free Korea (1953–1973); Radio Korea (1973–1994); Radio Korea International (1994–2004)
- Official website: world.kbs.co.kr

KBS World Radio (Korean: KBS 월드라디오; formerly Radio Korea and Radio Korea International) is the official international broadcasting station of South Korea. Owned by the Korean Broadcasting System, the station broadcasts news and information in 11 languages: Korean, English, Chinese, Japanese, Indonesian, Arabic, Vietnamese, Russian, German, French and Spanish.

== History ==
- August 15, 1953: Starts broadcasts as The Voice of Free Korea, but only in English.
- December 1, 1955: Begins broadcasting in Japanese.
- September 2, 1957: Begins broadcasting in Korean.
- April 10, 1958: Begins broadcasting in French.
- February 13, 1961: Begins broadcasting in Russian.
- August 10, 1961: Begins broadcasting in Chinese.
- August 19, 1962: It begins to broadcast in Spanish.
- April 1, 1973: Changes its name to Radio Korea.
- June 2, 1975: Begins broadcasting in Indonesian.
- September 10, 1975: The transmitting station in Gimje is founded and bengins broadcast in Arabic.
- 1980: The transmitting station in Hwaseong is founded.
- May 1, 1981: Begins broadcasting in German.
- June 1, 1983: It begins to broadcast in Portuguese.
- June 1, 1985: It begins to broadcast in Italian.
- March 31, 1994: Ends broadcasting in Portuguese.
- August 15, 1994: Changes its name to Radio Korea International.
- October 31, 1994: Ends broadcasting in Italian.
- November 3, 1997: KBS begins broadcasting it online.
- May 3, 2002: Simulcasts with NHK 1 Radio.
- June 2002: The transmission of the 2002 Soccer World Cup begins.
- August 15, 2003: For the radio's 50th anniversary, it begins to broadcast via satellite.
- March 3, 2005: Changes its name to KBS World Radio.
- March 3, 2005: Begins broadcasting in Vietnamese.
- January 2007: Hwaseong Station closes.
- June 1, 2013: Event for the 60th anniversary of radio
- August 19, 2022: 60th Anniversary of Service Event in Spanish
- July 14, 2023: KBS WORLD Radio celebrates the 70th anniversary of its founding with a K-POP Concert.

== Diffusion ==
The radio transmits in shortwave through a single transmitter on Korean soil in Kimjae: built in 1975, it is located 270 kilometers south of Seoul and includes seven transmitters, three of which are 250 kW and four are 100 kW.

== English-language programs ==
=== Current ===
Programs	Schedule	Host(s)
News	Everyday from 17:00 - 17:10 (KST)	Arius Derr, Rosyn Park, Mark Broome
Korea24	Every Monday to Friday from 19:10 - 20:00 (KST)	Alannah Hill
K-Pop Connection	Every Monday to Friday from 20:00 - 22:00 (KST)	Brian Joo
Sounds of Korea	Every Wednesday from 22:10 - 22:30 (KST)	Walter Lee
Korea, Today and Tomorrow	Every Thursday from 22:10 - 22:30 (KST)	Kim Yun-jeong
Korea Travelog	Every Friday from 22:10 - 22:30 (KST)	Jenny Jo
Weekend Playlist	Every Saturday and Sunday from 17:00 - 20:00 (KST)	Alexander
Wonder Hours with Hyerim	Every Monday to Friday from 17:10 - 19:10 (KST)	Woo Hye-rim

=== Former ===
Programs	Schedule	Host
One Fine Day with Lena Park	Every Monday to Friday from 17:10 - 19:10 (KST)	Lena Park
Business Watch	Every Monday from 22:10 - 22:30 (KST)	Mark Broome
Books on Demand	Every Tuesday from 22:10 - 22:30 (KST)	Jenny Jo

== See also ==
- KBS, South Korea's premier public broadcaster
- KBS World
