= Gugak FM =

Gugak FM 국악 FM
South Korea
- Broadcast area: South Korea Seoul, Gyeonggi, and Jeolla, and Gyeongsang, and Gangwon
- Frequencies: FM: 99.1 MHz (Seoul Metro Area); 103.3 MHz(Gangneung); 90.5 MHz(Daejeon); 99.3 MHz(Yeongdong); 101.7 MHz(Chungju); 95.9 MHz (Namwon); 95.3 MHz(Jeonju); 94.7 MHz (Haenam); 99.3 MHz(Gwangju); 91.3MHz(Jeju City); 106.9MHz(Seogwipo); 98.5 MHz(Busan); 107.5 MHz(Daegu); 107.9 MHz (Gyeongju, Pohang)

Programming
- Format: Traditional Korean music

Ownership
- Owner: Gugak FM Foundation

History
- First air date: 2001

Links
- Website: www.gugakfm.co.kr

Gugak FM is a South Korean radio broadcasting station specializing in Korean traditional music (gugak) and culture. Its coverage extends through Seoul, Gyeonggi-do, and Jeollado, and Gyeongsang, and Gangwon Province.
