= KBS Radio 3 =

South Korea radio station

- South Korea
- Frequencies: HLKC:AM 1134 kHz; HLKC-SFM: FM: 104.9 MHz (Seoul)
- Branding: KBS Voice of Love FM (Nickname)

Programming
- Language: Korean
- Format: Sports, Disabilities, the Elderly, Socially, Marginalized, Persons, News

Ownership
- Owner: KBS
- Sister stations: KBS Radio 1, KBS Radio 2, KBS Classic FM, KBS Cool FM, KBS Hanminjok Radio

History
- First air date: 1995~2000 (HLKA(SCA)); 1980~Present (HLKC); 2010~Present (HLKC-SFM)
- Former frequencies: AM 639 kHz (1980~2010)

Links
- Webcast: Listen Live

KBS Radio 3 (a.k.a. KBS Voice of Love FM) (AM 1134 kHz/FM 104.9 MHz) is a national radio station for persons with disabilities, the elderly, and social minorities. Owned by the Korean Broadcasting System, Radio 3 broadcasts daily from 6:00 a.m. to 3:00 a.m. the following day.

== Frequencies ==
=== Seoul, Incheon, Gyeonggi Province ===
Callsign	Frequency	Power (kW)	Transmitter Location
HLSA-AM	AM 1134kHz	500kW	Namyang
HLSA-SFM	FM 104.9MHz	2kW	Gwanaksan

== See also ==
- SBS Love FM
- SBS Power FM
