= KBS Classic FM =

South Korea radio station

KBS Classic FM (HLKA-FM)
South Korea
- Frequency: See list

Programming
- Format: Classical, Lied, Traditional Korean music

Ownership
- Owner: KBS
- Sister stations: KBS Radio 1, KBS Radio 2, KBS Radio 3, KBS Cool FM, KBS Hanminjok Radio

History
- First air date: 1979
- Call sign meaning: KA for "Korea"

Links
- Webcast: Listen Live

KBS Classic FM (also known as KBS 1FM) is a South Korean radio network operated by the Korean Broadcasting System. Most of the schedule is assigned to classical music, making it one of the few radio networks in the world that broadcast mainly in its music format (notable ones include RNZ Concert in Auckland, New Zealand, ABC Classic in Sydney, Australia, WFMT Radio Network in Chicago, United States BBC Radio 3 in London, United Kingdom, DZFE in Manila, Philippines).

== Frequencies ==
- Seoul/Incheon/Gyeonggi 93.1 MHz
- Chuncheon/Gapyeong/Gangwon 91.1 MHz
- Busan/South Gyeongsang Province 92.7 MHz
- Ulsan 101.9 MHz
- Changwon/Masan/Jinhae 93.9 MHz
- Jinju/Sacheon 89.3 MHz
- Geochang 92.1 MHz
- Daegu 89.7 MHz
- Andong/Yeongju 88.1 MHz
- Pohang/Gyeongju 93.5 MHz
- Gwangju 92.3 MHz
- Yosu/Suncheon 94.5 MHz
- Mokpo 98.3 MHz
- Jeonju/North Jeolla Province 100.7 MHz
- Namwon 104.5 MHz
- Daejeon/South Chungcheong Province 98.5 MHz
- Cheongju/Okcheon 102.1 MHz
- Cheongju/Cheongwon 94.1 MHz
- Chungju/Eumseong 100.3 MHz
- Gangneung/Sokcho 89.1 MHz
- Taebaek 97.3 MHz
- Wonju 89.5 MHz
- Jeju/North Jeju 96.3 MHz
- Seogwipo/South Jeju 99.9 MHz

== See also ==
- KBS Cool FM
- Gugak FM
- Gyeonggi Broadcasting Corporation
