= KBS Radio 2 =

South Korea radio station

South Korea
- Frequencies: HLSA-AM:AM 603 kHz; HLSA-FM:FM 106.1 MHz (Seoul); 97.1 MHz (Busan) ...more
- Branding: KBS Happy FM (Nickname)

Programming
- Format: K-Pop, Entertainment

Ownership
- Owner: KBS
- Sister stations: KBS Radio 1, KBS Radio 3, KBS Classic FM, KBS Cool FM, KBS Hanminjok Radio

History
- First air date: 1933; 93 years ago (AM Band); 2000; 26 years ago (FM Band)

Links
- Webcast: Listen Live

KBS Radio 2 (Korean: KBS 2 라디오; also known by its nickname Happy FM) is a K-Pop and entertainment network of the Korean Broadcasting System. Opened in 1933 on AM Radio, the network began utilising FM Radio frequencies 67 years later for a clearer audio reception.

Radio 2 operates daily from 5:00 am to 3:00 am of the following day. National programs originate from Seoul, with regional opt-outs as well as rebroadcasts of selected KBS 2FM programs are aired across local stations operating on FM and, if applicable, AM radio.

== Stations ==
=== Seoul, Incheon, Gyeonggi Province ===
Callsign	Frequency	Power (kW)	Transmitter Location
HLSA-AM	AM 603 kHz	500 kW	Namyang
HLSA-FM	FM 106.1 MHz	25 kW	Gwanaksan

=== Other Provinces ===
- Chuncheon : FM 98.7 MHz
- Wonju : FM 100.5, 88.1 MHz
- Gangneung : FM 102.1 MHz, FM 106.7 MHz, FM 103.9 MHz
- Daejeon : FM 100.9 MHz, FM 89.5 MHz
- Cheongju : FM 90.9 MHz
- Jeonju : FM 92.9 MHz
- Gwangju : FM 95.5 MHz
- Mokpo : FM 88.1 MHz
- Suncheon : FM 102.7 MHz, FM 100.9 MHz, FM 106.7 MHz
- Daegu : AM 558 kHz, FM 102.3 MHz
- Gimcheon : FM 88.9 MHz
- Ulleung Island : FM 92.1 MHz
- Busan : FM 97.1 MHz, FM 99.5 MHz
- Changwon : FM 106.1 MHz, FM 99.7 MHz
- Jeju : FM 91.9 MHz, FM 89.7 MHz, FM 92.7 MHz

== History ==
- 1933 - Chōsen Broadcasting Corporation's Second Broadcasting (Korean: 조선방송협회 제2방송, JODB, 660 kHz) started broadcasting.
- 1947 - Chōsen Broadcasting Corporation Closed. Relaunched as KBS Second broadcasting (Korean: KBS 제2방송, HLSA).
- 1972 - Frequency Moved 660 to 600 kHz.
- November 1, 1978 - Frequency Moved 600 to 603 kHz.
- December 1, 1980 - Renamed as KBS Radio 2. along with the launch of KBS Radio 3, KBS 2FM (Now Cool FM Formerly TBC Radio), KBS Radio Seoul (Now SBS Love FM Formerly DBS) and KBS 1FM (Now Classic FM), the station relaunched as a popular music station that same day.
- July 1, 2000 - KBS 2 Radio FM repeater 106.1 MHz Launched.
- October 20, 2003 - KBS Radio 2 Renamed as Happy FM. Reformated as an entertainment radio station for the middle aged with News, sitcoms, radio dramas, entertainment and trot music programs filling up schedules.
- March 3, 2005 - Viewable Radio (BORA) Broadcast launched.
- June 5, 2013 - Radio 2 reformatted back as a popular music station with KPop and Pop music programs filling the schedules, News, sitcoms, radio dramas, entertainment and some trot music programs have been removed.
- April 25, 2016 - Local Radio 2 stations started cross-broadcast with KBS 2FM in order for the latter to air its selected shows nationally.

== See also ==
- KBS Radio 1
- EBS FM
- MBC FM4U
- Traffic Broadcasting System
- EBS 1TV
- Far East Broadcasting Company
