= Educational Broadcasting System =

South Korean educational broadcaster

Korea Educational Broadcasting System (EBS); 한국교육방송공사

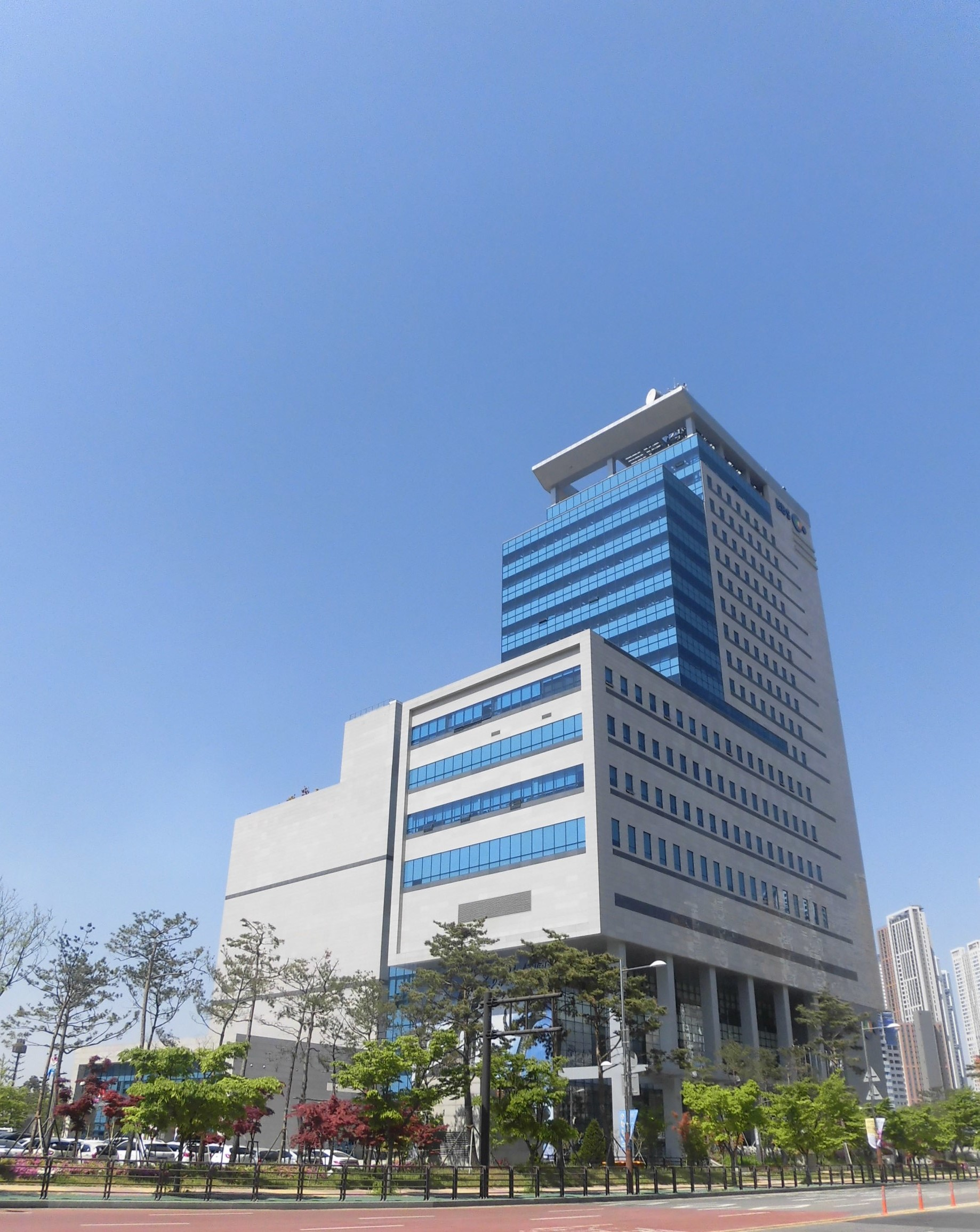
- Type: Terrestrial radio and television
- Country: South Korea
- Availability: South Korea; North America; South America (except Chile and Uruguay); Europe; Australia
- Owner: Government of South Korea
- Key people: Myung-joong Kim, President
- Launch date: 1990; 36 years ago
- Callsigns: HLQL
- Official website: www.ebs.co.kr

Korea Educational Broadcasting System (Korean: 한국교육방송공사) or EBS is a South Korean educational public radio and television network focused on the South Korean territory. It is the only major South Korean radio and television network that is a joint venture between the Ministry of Science and ICT and the Ministry of Education without a separate regional service. It was established as KBS 3 and KBS Educational Radio in the 1980s and became an independent corporation in 1990.

== Funding ==
Though nominally a public broadcasting entity, EBS derives most of its annual revenue from advertisements and sales. In 2012, 72.1% of its revenue came from textbook sales, publications, and advertising on its television, radio, and internet platforms, while the remainder came from television license fees and government grants. EBS receives 3% of the total television license fees collected nationwide.

== CEOs ==
Term	Name	Inaugutation	Retirement
1st	Park Heung-soo (Resigned)	2000	2001
2nd	Kim Hak-cheon	2001	2003
3rd	Go Seok-man (Resigned)	2003	2005
4th	Kwon Young-man	2005	2006
5th	Gu Gwan-seo	September 2006	October 2009
6th	Gwak Deok-hun	October 2009	November 2012
7th	Shin Yong-seop	November 2012	November 2015
8th	Woo Jong-beom (Resigned)	November 2015	August 2017
Acting	Jo Gyu-jo	August 2017	September 2017
9th	Jang Hae-rang (Resigned)	September 2017	December 2018
Acting	Jo Gyu-jo	December 2018	March 2019
10th	Kim Myung-jung	March 2019	March 2022
11th	Kim Yoo-yeol	March 2022	March 2025
12th	Shin Dong-ho (Suspended from appointment)	March 2025	July 2025
13th		July 2025	July 2028 (Expected)

== Channels ==
- EBS1 — EBS' main terrestrial channel for premium documentaries, preschool and youth program. (Channel 10.1)
- EBS2 — EBS' second terrestrial channel. (Channel 10.2)
- EBS FM — A EBS' radio channel, the station focuses mainly on language learning. The actual CSAT listening comprehension examinations are broadcast on this station annually at 8:40 AM and 1:10 PM on the day of the CSAT.
- EBS Plus 1 (subscription television) — The channel focuses greatly around the high school test curriculum and offers programming to complement and amplify the student's in-school education.
- EBS Plus 2 (subscription television) — The main focus of this channel is "lifelong" learning, with various programs for younger and older viewers.
- EBS English (subscription television) — This is the network's English education channel, covering kids from kindergarten to grade 12.
- EBS Kids (subscription television) — EBS' children's channel; formerly a simulcast of EBS Plus 1.

EBS offers one pay-television channel, EBS America, in the United States. Its programming centres around Korean culture, language education, and children's shows.

== Logos ==
First EBS logo (December 27, 1990 until June 25, 1995)

Second EBS logo (June 26, 1995 until June 24, 2001)

Third EBS logo (June 25, 2001 until February 29, 2004)

Fourth and current EBS logo (March 1, 2004 to present)

== Programming ==
=== Originally-produced ===
- Teletoon Advance
- Bboongbboong-E (뿡뿡이)
- Piwi-chan! 3D Anime Series (피위짱! 3D 애니메이션 시리즈)
- Chiro (치로와 친구들)
- EBS News 12 (EBS 뉴스 12)
- EBS Evening News (EBS 저녁뉴스)
- Jisik Channel e (Knowledge Channel e; 지식채널e)
- The EBS space GongGam (EBS 스페이스 공감)
- Oops! Ikooo (우당탕탕 아이쿠!)
- Tayo the Little Bus (꼬마버스 타요)
- Titipo Titipo (띠띠뽀 띠띠뽀)
- Janghak Quiz (장학퀴즈)
- Ding-Dong-Dang kindergarten (딩동댕유치원)
- Miniforce (최강전사 미니특공대)
- GO! GO! Giggles (가다! 가다! 킥킥)
- English Café (영어 카페)
- Vroomiz (부릉! 부릉! 브루미즈)
- Boni and Hani (생방송 톡! 톡! 보니 하니)
- Solver (생방송 뭐든지 해결단)
- Brian's English Adventure (브라이언의 영어 모험)
- Cocomong (냉장고 나라 코코몽)
- Pororo the Little Penguin (뽀롱뽀롱 뽀로로)
- Bernard (倒霉熊))
- Robocar Poli (로보카폴리)
- The Airport Diary (두리둥실 뭉게공항)
- Semi and the Magic Cube (세미와 매직큐브)
- Super Wings (출동! 슈퍼윙스)
- Our Body X-Files (우리 몸 X파일)
- Smart! Our Body X-Files (똑똑! 우리 몸 X파일)
- Beep! Beep! Our Body X-Files (삐뽀삐뽀! 우리 몸 X파일)
- Emergency Situation! Our Body X-Files (긴급상황! 우리 몸 X파일)
- Emergency Medical Situation! Our Body X-Files (응급상황! 우리 몸 X파일)
- Alarmest Saved! Our Body X-Files (알람이 구출됐다! 우리 몸 X파일)
- Fire Robo (출동! 파이어로보)
- Tickety Toc (시계마을 티키톡!)
- Road Diary (로드 다이어리)
- Flowering Heart (플라워링 하트)
- Larva in New York (라바 인 뉴욕)
- Giant Peng TV (자이언트 펭TV)
- My Daughter Is a Zombie (좀비가 되어버린 나의 딸)
- Rainbow Bubblegem (레인보우 버블젬)

==== Imported series ====
All are foreign cartoons dubbed in Korean.

- The Magic School Bus (신기한 스쿨버스)
- Arthur (내 친구 아서)
- Animaniacs (애니매니악스)
- Cyberchase (신나는 사이버 수학세상)
- Denver, the Last Dinosaur (마지막 공룡, 덴버)
- Bill Nye the Science Guy (빌 아저씨의 과학 이야기)
- The Simpsons (심슨 가족)
- SpongeBob SquarePants (네모네모 스펀지송)
- The Tom and Jerry Show (톰과 제리 쇼)
- Steven Universe (스티븐 유니버스)
- The Fairly OddParents (별난깜찍 수호천사)
- Tiny Toon Adventures (타이니 툰)
- Rugrats (야! 러그레츠)
- All Grown Up! (컸다 러그래츠)
- The Wild Thornberrys (앨리의 야생탐험)
- Bluey (블루이)
- Rocket Power (악동클럽)
- Dora the Explorer (도라도라 영어나라)
- The Adventures of Jimmy Neutron, Boy Genius (천재소년 지미 뉴트론)
- Yo Gabba Gabba! (영어 유치원 요 가바가바!)
- Phineas and Ferb (피니와 퍼브)
- SuperKitties (슈퍼키티스)
- Mickey Mouse Clubhouse (미키마우스 클럽하우스)
- Handy Manny (만능 수리공 매니)
- My Friends Tigger & Pooh (내 친구 티거와 푸)
- Little Einsteins (리틀 아인슈타인)
- Fifi and the Flowertots (피피와 꽃 토츠)
- Paw Patrol (퍼피 구조대)
- The Flintstones (프린스톤 가족)
- The Mozart Band (모차르트 밴드)
- The Koala Brothers (도와줘요! 코알라 형제)
- Miles From Tomorrowland (투모로우 나라의 마일스)
- Ben 10 (벤 10)
- Transformers: Prime (트랜스포머 프라임)
- Hi-5 (하이 파이부)
- Finley the Fire Engine (용감한 트럭, 프레디)
- Rubbadubbers (스플리시! 튀김! 돈! 러버더버)
- Fireman Sam (출동! 소방관 샘)
- Postman Pat (우편 배달부 팻 아저씨)
- Yvon of the Yukon (유콘의 이반)
- Marsupilami (우바우바! 마수필라미)
- Untalkative Bunny (노란토끼 바니)
- Charlie & Lola (찰리 형제, 롤라 자매)
- Thomas & Friends (꼬마기관차 토마스와 친구들)
- Bear in the Big Blue House (춤추는 빅베어)
- Ping and Friends(내친구 핑)
- Dinosaur Train (아기 공룡 버디)
- The Loud House (링컨의 집에서 살아남기)
- Gravity Falls (디퍼와 메이블의 미스터리 모험)
- Almost Naked Animals (시끌벅적 하우이와 벌거숭이들)
- Scaredy Squirrel (겁쟁이 다람쥐 토토리)
- Numb Chucks (딜펑 브라더스)
- The Adventures of Bottle Top Bill and His Best Friend Corky (병뚜껑 빌)
- The Jungle Book (정글북)
- Storm Hawks (스톰 호크)
- Geronimo Stilton (제로니모의 모험)
- Peppa Pig (꿀꿀! 페파는 즐거워)
- Oswald (안녕! 오스월드)
- Mike the Knight (꼬마기사 마이크)
- Bubble Guppies (버블버블 인어친구들)
- Firebuds (긴급 구조 친구들)
- Franklin and Friends (꼬마거북 프랭클린)
- The New Adventures of Winnie the Pooh (곰돌이 푸의 새로운 모험)
- Henry's World (당근소년 헨리)
- The Backyardigans (꾸러기 상상여행)
- Abby's Flying Fairy School (신나는 요정학교)
- Doraemon (도라에몽)
- Doc McStuffins (꼬마의사 맥스터핀스)
- Sofia the First (리틀 프린세스 소피아)
- Big City Greens (빅 시티 그린)
- Spidey and His Amazing Friends (스파이디 그리고 놀라운 친구들)
- Poppy Cat (고양이 파피)
- Adventure Time (어드벤처 타임)
- The Looney Tunes Show (루니 툰 - 벅스 버니와 대피 덕)
- My Little Pony: Friendship Is Magic (사랑! 사랑! 마이리틀포니)
- Littlest Pet Shop (리틀 펫 프렌즈)
- Chuggington (칙칙폭폭 처깅턴)
- Dragon Tales (용용나라로 떠나요)
- The Lion Guard (라이온 수호대)
- Eureka! (유레카!)
- T.U.F.F. Puppy (비밀요원 터프퍼피)
- The Mr. Men Show (와글와글 친구들)
- Clarence (클라렌스는 엉뚱해!)
- Mama Mirabelle's Home Movies (미라벨의 동물극장)
- We Bare Bears (위 베어 베어스)
- Pingu (꼬마펭귄 핑구)
- Caillou (호야네 집)
- Masha and the Bear (마샤 와 곰)
- Team Umizoomi (수학특공대 우미주미)
- Shaun the Sheep (못말리는 어린양 숀)
- Lunar Jim (루나짐의 달나라 탐사대)
- Roary the Racing Car (달려라! 카카)
- Dirtgirlworld (두근두근 신나는 뒷마당)
- Blaze and the Monster Machines (가다! 가다! 불꽃)
- Harvey Beaks (하비 비크스)
- LazyTown (Season 1-2 only) (강철 수염과 게으른 동네)
- Pocoyo (호기심 대장 포코요)
- Miraculous Ladybug (레이디버그)
- Angry Birds Toons (Season 1 only) (앵그리버드 툰즈)
- Franny's Feet (구두신고 꼬까꼬까)
- The Save-Ums! (느낌표 구조대)
- Little Bear (곰돌이와 숲속친구들)
- Boo! (깜짝친구 부우!)
- Poppets Town (알쏭달쏭 호기심 마을)
- Connie the Cow (얼룩송아지 코니)
- Jakers! The Adventures of Piggley Winks (꼬마돼지 피글리의 모험)
- Watch My Chops (단짝친구 바리와 뭉치)
- The Paz Show (뭐하니 패즈)
- Clifford the Big Red Dog (사랑해 클리포드)
- Paddington Bear (유쾌한 곰돌이 패딩턴)
- Maggie and the Ferocious Beast (매기와 환상의 나라로)
- Mermaid Melody Pichi Pichi Pitch (피치피치핏치)
- Mermaid Melody Pichi Pichi Pitch Pure (피치피치핏치)
- Watership Down (워터십 다운의 토끼들)
- Peep and the Big Wide World (곤음증과 넓은 세상)
- Timothy Goes to School (티모시네 유치원)
- Wow! Wow! Wubbzy! (내친구웹지 노란색거빌)
- ToddWorld (토드의즐거운세상)
- Ready Jet Go! (우주 탐험가 젯)
- Super Why! (수퍼와이)
- Doki (두키 탐험대)
- Dot. (호기심 소녀 도트)
- Dino Ranch (공룡 목장 다이노 랜치)
- Oddbods (오드봇: 이상한 아이들)
- The Fixies (픽시)
- Strawberry Shortcake (2003 TV series) (꼬마숙녀 스트로베리)
- Messy Goes to Okido (호기심 나라 오키도)
- Angelina Ballerina (안젤리나 발레리나)
- Olobob Top (알록달록 올로밥)
- Amphibia (신비한 개구리 나라 앰피비아)
- Rusty Rivets (로봇 발명왕 러스티)
- Bob the Builder (뚝딱뚝딱 밥 아저씨)
- Pok & Mok (지구를 지켜라)
- Deer Squad (디어 스쿼드)
- Big Blue (TV series) (빅 블루)
- Donkey Hodie (당나귀 호디)
- Frog and Friends (개구리와 친구들)
- Clever Raccoon Dog (영리한 너구리)
- Daniel Tiger's Neighborhood (다니엘 타이거의 이웃)
- 64 Zoo Lane (루시의 꿈나라 이야기)
- Fluffy Gardens (몽실몽실 동물마을)

=== EBS Radio ===
- Morning Special (8:00~9:00, Mondays through Saturday) and Saturday Morning Special (same time, Saturday)
- CSAT Listening Comprehension (8:40 & 13:10, day of CSAT)

=== EBS Plus ===
- Survival English

== See also ==
- Public broadcasting
- Mass media in South Korea
- List of radio stations in South Korea
- Television in South Korea
- Korean Broadcasting System
