= KBS Cool FM =

South Korea radio station

KBS Cool FM (HLKC-FM)
- South Korea
- Frequency: See list

Programming
- Language: Korean
- Format: Hot adult contemporary, Comedy, Entertainment

Ownership
- Owner: KBS
- Sister stations: KBS Radio 1; KBS Radio 2; KBS Radio 3; KBS Classic FM; KBS Hanminjok Radio

History
- First air date: June 26, 1965
- Former call signs: HLCD-AM and HLCD-FM (1965–1966)
- Former frequencies: AM 639 kHz (Repeater until 1980)

Technical information
- Power: 10,000 watts (Seoul)

Links
- Webcast: Listen Live

KBS Cool FM (Korean: KBS 쿨FM), also known as KBS 2FM (KBS 제2FM방송), is a 24-hour Hot AC music and entertainment radio station of the Korean Broadcasting System. It plays mostly older K-pop Music from the 90s compared to KBS Happy FM which plays the latest K-pop tracks. (Note: This was a result of the reformat of KBS Radio 2 back again as a pure popular music radio station in 2013.) Notable shows include Gayo Plaza, Volume Up and Kiss the Radio.

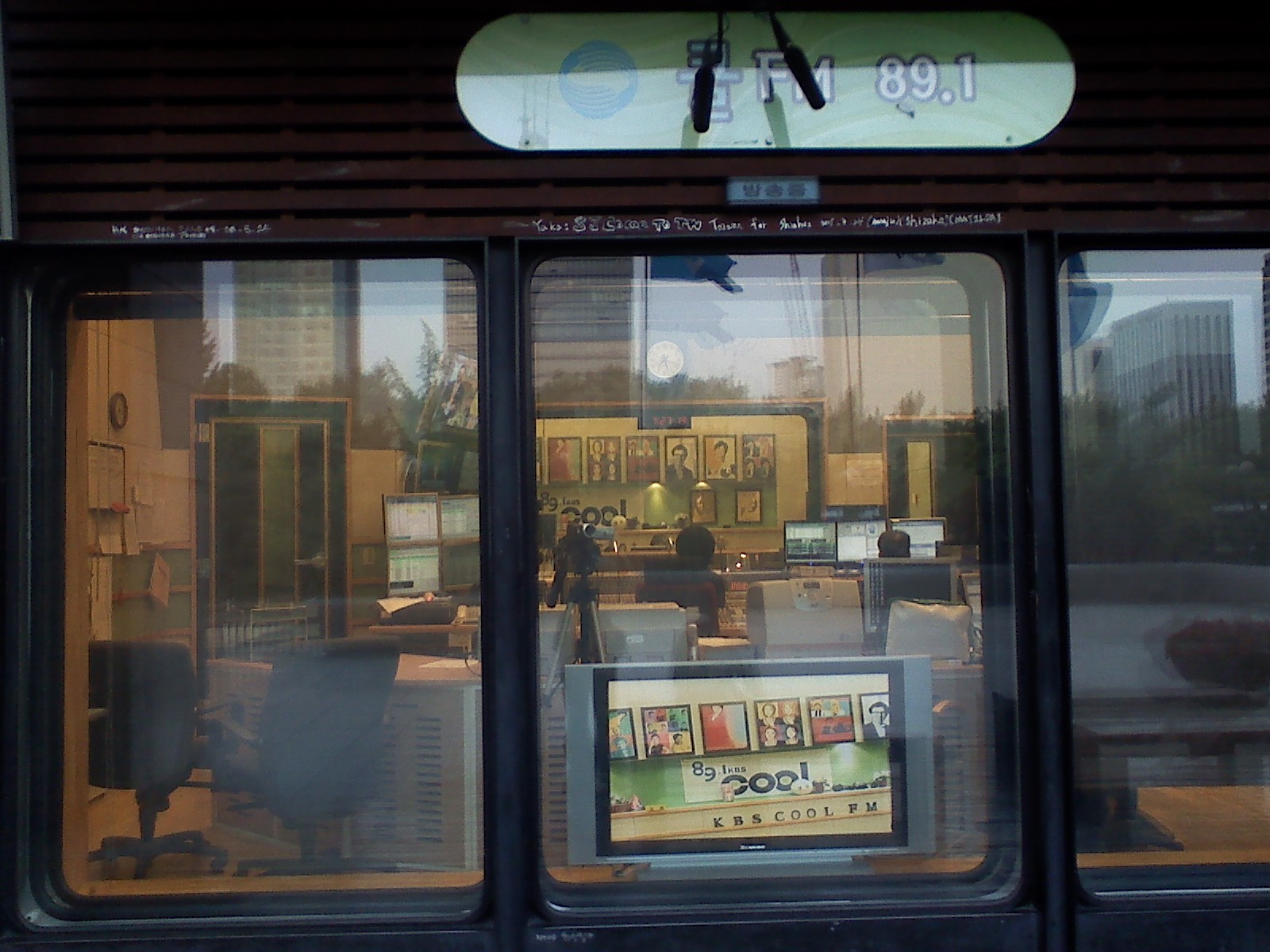
Cool FM Studios.

== History ==
=== TBC Radio Era ===
- 26 June 1965: Tongyang Broadcasting Corporation (동양 방송 공사) (Former body of JTBC) was launched.
- 27 June 1965: Radio Seoul Broadcasting (라디오 서울 방송) HLCD 639 kHz Started broadcasting.
- 1966: Renamed as TBC Radio. 89.1 MHz FM Repeater (Standard FM) launched. Callsign changed to HLKC/HLKC-SFM
- 1970: TBC Radio Started South Korea's First Stereo FM Broadcast.
- 1 December 1980: TBC Radio forced to be merged into KBS Radio by the special law of Chun Doo-hwan as president of military authorities.

=== KBS 2FM Era ===
- 25 December 1980: Relaunched as KBS 2FM (KBS 제2FM) with a Trot and Popular Music format. Callsign changed to HLKC-FM and 639 kHz AM Repeater stopped broadcasting with the frequency used to form KBS Radio 3. Airing of advertisements where abolished and started airing selected shows nationwide through Cross-Broadcast with the KBS Local FM Network (composed of former provincial TBC Radio stations) along with KBS 1FM.
- 24 December 1988: KBS 2FM Started Partial 24-hour Broadcast (Monday~Friday 24-hours and Saturday~Sunday 18-hours).
- 30 May 1990: Transmission power increased (TPO:1 kW ERP:173.5 kW → TPO:10 kW ERP:350 kW)
- 1 October 1994: 24-hour Broadcast started.

=== Cool FM Era ===
- 1 January 2002: Commercial advertisements resume broadcast on 2FM and nationwide cross-broadcast with the Local FM network where abolished.
- 10 October 2003: Relaunched as KBS Cool FM (KBS 쿨FM)
- 3 March 2005: KBS Cool FM Opened its studio to the public along with KBS Radio 2.
- 2006: Started visual radio (BORA) broadcasts on the internet.
- 2 March 2010: KBS Moved Cool FM's radio transmitter from Mount Namsan to Mount Gwanaksan.
- 2016: KBS 2FM Resumed national broadcasting of select programs through Cross-Broadcast with Local Radio 2 Stations with Park Myeong-su's Radio Show being the first show to be heard nationally.

== Accessibility ==
=== FM Radio ===
Cool FM is available terrestrially in select cities including Seoul, Incheon, Chuncheon, Wonju, Hongcheon, Hoengseong, Cheorwon, Cheonan, Asan, Yesan, Hongseong, Dangjin, Seosan, Taean, Jincheon, Eumseong and Chungju.

Transmitter	Callsign	Frequency	Power	Transmitter location
Mt. Gwanaksan	HLKC-FM	FM 89.1 MHz	10 kW	Bisan-dong, Dongan-gu, Anyang-si, Gyeonggi-do (Mt. Gwanak)
Seongnam	-	FM 97.7 MHz	200W	Eunhaeng-dong, Jungwon-gu, Seongnam-si, Gyeonggi-do
Baengnyeongdo	-	FM 90.9 MHz	100W	Bukpo-ri, Baengnyeong-myeon, Ongjin-gun, Incheon metropolitan city

Outside of the main station's coverage area, Cool FM can be heard through local Happy FM stations at these times: 5:00~9:00AM KST, 11:00AM~2:00PM KST, and 6:00~8:00PM KST.

=== DMB Radio(U-KBS Music) ===
In other areas not reachable terrestrially, Cool FM's programs can be heard via U-KBS' DMB channels.

- Seoul : CH 12B
- Chuncheon : CH 13B
- Daejeon/Cheongju : CH 11B
- Gwangju/Jeonju: CH 12B/CH 8B/CH 7B
- Daegu : CH 7B/CH 9B
- Busan/Ulsan : CH 12B/CH 9B
- Jeju : CH 13B/CH 8B

== Trivia ==
- Despite being South Korea's No.10 radio station, 2FM Program Volume Up became the highest-rated radio program in its timeslot across both AM and FM bandwidths in Seoul.

== Slogans ==
- 대한민국 뉴스, 드라마, 대중음악 라디오 방송국 89.1 메가 사이클 TBC 동양방송 (South Korea's News, Drama, Popular Music Station 89.1 Megahertz TBC Tongyang Broadcasting TBC Era Slogan until 1980)
- 젊은 채널, 감성 채널 2FM (The Youth channel, The Emotional channel 2FM 2003~2014)
- 대중음악 89.1 (Popular Music 89.1 1980~1999 2010~2014)
- Today's Best Music 2FM (2014~Present)

== See also ==
- KBS Classic FM
- Gugak FM
- Gyeonggi Broadcasting Corporation
