= Political Desk =

Political newscast airing on JTBC

- Titlecard used until December 4, 2020 (National Political News Show is put above the title)
- Also known as: Politics Desk; Political Journalists' Meeting 다정회
- Hangul: 정치부회의
- Hanja: 政治部會議
- RR: Jeongchibu hoeui
- MR: Chŏngch'ibu hoeŭi
- Genre: News
- Created by: Kim Pil-kyu
- Developed by: JTBC Press Bureau
- Presented by: Lee Sang-bok
- Starring: Park Joon-woo; Cho Ik-shin; Ryu Jeong-hwa; Shin Hye-won; Baek Da-hye
- Opening theme: Solo Battle by Lee Seung-hwan
- Country of origin: South Korea
- Original language: Korean

Production
- Production location: South Korea
- Camera setup: Multiple-camera setup
- Running time: 80 minutes

Original release
- Network: JTBC
- Release: April 7, 2014 – June 30, 2023

Political Desk (Korean: 정치부회의; lit. 'Political Conference') was a South Korean news program airing on JTBC. It has a lighthearted, sometimes satirical, approach to political events in South Korea. It is presented by Lee Sang-bok, with Cho Ik-shin, Shin Hye-won, Ryu Jeong-hwa, Park Joon-woo and Baek Da-hye. It airs Monday to Friday at 16:30 KST.

== History and format ==
=== Origins ===
Kim Pil-kyu had the idea of producing a political newscast, and he drew a cartoon about it, which was posted on the show's official Twitter account. Originally called Report! Political Meeting at 4:00, it premiered on April 7, 2014. It was presented by Choi Sang-yeon, with Oh Dae-young, Yang Won-bo, Nam Gung-wook and Lee Sung-dae on the panel representing the ruling party, National Assembly, the Blue House, and the opposition, respectively. Kim initially produced this show before being tapped to produce and host JTBC Newsroom's Fact Check segment later that year. He then became the main anchor of the show's weekend edition following Jeon Jin-bae's departure.

=== Reshuffles ===
==== 2015 ====
Starting July 2015, multiple reorganizations were held. Im So-ra replaced Blue House captain Nam Gung-wook on July 6, 2015. Opposition leader Lee Sung-dae followed suit 18 days later, and Kim Jung-ha joined as the new head of the National Assembly, replacing Yang Won-bo who moved to Lee's vacated position. Announcer Kang Ji-young also joined the show on July 13, 2015, as a fixed member, hosting the segment Kang Ji-young's Talk Shooting Politics. Yang then stepped down on September 24, leading Yoo Sang-wook to join as the show's new opposition leader. Lee Sang-bok joined the show as its new anchor/moderator on December 14, replacing Choi Sang-yeon, who joined JoongAng Ilbo as one of its new editorial writers. As of this reorganization, only Oh Dae-young was the original member to be on the show. It was later revamped to Political Desk around the end of the year.

==== 2016 ====
2016 also saw multiple reshuffles on the captains' assignments. Oh Dae-young, the program's only remaining original member, stepped down on the broadcast on July 8, along with Kim Jung-ha who was then the head of the National Assembly. Yang Won-bo returned to his original role vacated by Kim on July 11, while Jung Kang-hyun replaces Oh who was the leader of the ruling party. Jung was the head of JoongAng Ilbo's youth reporting team before joining the program. Later that year, Yoo Sang-wook also departed from his role as opposition leader after he was appointed the head of Social Issues team 2. Choi Jong-hyuk replaces him starting December 21.

==== 2017 ====
The first reshuffle of the year happened following the 2017 South Korean presidential elections. Then-opposition leader Choi Jong-hyuk and then-ruling party leader Jung Kang-hyun swapped places on May 10, 2017, at Lee Sang-bok's request, making it the first power switch since the show's inception. According to National Assembly captain Yang Won-bo, Jung seemed bitter about giving up his position to Choi, who was the show's youngest member at the time. Another change in its set and graphics happened on November 6, 2017, which was used until May 15, 2020. Towards the end of the year, Shin Hye-won joins the show as its new Blue House captain, replacing Im So-ra who left the show on December 8.

==== 2018 ====
July 13 saw the introduction of new opposition leader Go Suk-seung, who replaced Jung Kang-hyun following his departure. This year also saw Lee Sang-bok ascend to his new role as JTBC News' press director on November 20, officially replacing his title as director of the second politics division on the broadcast subtitles.

==== 2020 ====
Park Sung-tae and Cho Ik-shin joined the cast on January 6, 2020, following the departure of Lee Sang-bok and Yang Won-bo. Lee left to focus more on his role as press director due to the 2020 South Korean legislative elections, while Yang became the new general manager for JTBC News' policy team. Park eventually left on May 15, 2020, after over four months of hosting the show. It also became the show's last broadcast to be anchored from the open studio inside Trust Building. Choi Jong-hyuk teased towards the end that Lee Sang-bok might be making his return to the show after he did a reverse triangle gesture that became popular and was used on its opening IDs during his tenure. Park will now be JTBC Newsroom's new weekend editor. In addition, they will be moving to a new studio inside Creation Hall just beside it, and the open studio they used was renovated to be used by Scandal Supervisor. Lee Sang-bok made his official return to the show on May 18, 2020, while also debuting the show's new set and graphics package. Kang Ji-young's sole segment Talk Shooting Politics was abolished on the same day and replaced with On-site Briefing, promoting her as the show's on-site captain. Lee's former segment One-cut Politics made a return on the same day, along with Shin's Political School returning on June 3, 2020. It also established two new segments for each captain slowly, starting with Shin Hye-won (Minute Call-Call, New World), Choi Jong-hyuk (Check It Out, A Song For Something), Cho Ik-shin (Oh My Gosh, What's Wrong With You, Cho's Unanswered Questions) and Go Suk-seung (Ancient People, go! go! Sing!). There is also Dajeonghwe Theater, a segment where the captains work together for a skit. Starting on July 20, 2020, Yang becomes the first Political Desk member to have his own show with the premiere of 3:10 Relay. Captains Choi Jong-hyuk (ruling party) and Go Suk-seung (opposition) left the show on December 4, 2020, following another JTBC News large-scale reorganization. They will be replaced by Ryu Jeong-hwa and Park Joon-woo, respectively.

==== 2021 ====
Starting on May 17, 2021, the show migrated back to Trust Building to prepare for the large-scale JTBC News reorganization scheduled on June 7. Kang Ji-young's Field Briefing segment ended on May 18, 2021, marking her final day as part of the cast. She will be joining JTBC's new show Ssulzun Live with fellow alumni Park Sung-tae and Lee Sung-dae, prompting Baek Da-hye to replace her as sub-anchor. This will also mark their first major format change since its inception, with segments being catered to each captain's characters in the show and the captain titles being abolished entirely.

=== Format ===
The show's format is more lighthearted in approach than its other newscasts such as JTBC Newsroom, however, it took a more serious turn as Park Sung-tae became anchor/moderator. It is presented in the style of a meeting, as if to plan for a broadcast. The captains sometimes add jokes in their respective presentations, and tease each other, including Lee Sang-bok.

=== Opening theme ===
The opening theme is Lee Seung-hwan's Solo War, from his 2010 album Dreamizer. When he appeared on the third season of Hidden Singer, he expressed interest in the format of Political Desk and decided to let them use the song. Lee picked the song himself because of its rock sound and lyrical meaning.

== Segments ==
The fixed segments are those which appear regularly on the program, or are regular segments of the main anchor and field captain. The recurring segments are only added in by the captains for fun.

=== Current segments ===
==== Fixed segments ====
- Opening/Today's Political Meeting - the anchor/moderator (currently Lee Sang-bok) will be briefed by the panel about the day's political news. There was an instance that then-Newsroom weekday anchors Sohn Suk-hee and Ahn Na-kyung, as well as former weekend anchors Kim Pil-kyu and Jeon Jin-bae, along with Scandal Supervisor host Park Sung-joon, were spotted in the lobby just outside the studio. Choi Jong-hyuk pointed it out when Lee Sang-bok asked him why he kept looking towards them. Despite that, Sohn and Ahn have been seen on the background multiple times. This was temporarily stopped during the network's special coverage on the COVID-19 pandemic in South Korea, and in the process, the segments each captain host were also affected. It eventually went back on April 20, 2020, along with Intensive Talk. Starting December 7, 2020, Lee Sang-bok is briefed by two captains (that can be assigned at random) while on their seats.
- Intensive Talk - the main segment where each reporter gives their respective presentations. Each of the reporters have similar focus, but different in styles. This is also where the captains add a segment they created for fun. In the absence of the four captains, other political reporters take their spot, while one of the four captains take over the anchor chair if the anchor is absent.

=== Former segments ===
- Jung's Separated Gaze (정 반장의 시선분리) - in this segment, Jung Kang-hyun interviews a politician related to his presentation.
- When Politics Meet Music (정치가 음악을 만났을 때) - this was Jung Kang-hyun's only fixed segment before the reorganization, in which he uses his extensive knowledge as a cultural reporter, as well as his musical ability, to bring a musically appropriate side to a political story. He also uses poetry and quotes from novels.
- Friday Tea Room (금요 고다방) - this segment is similar to the When Politics Meet Music segment above, where viewers selected songs that go along with their stories. Go Suk-seung revived this segment as Go's Friday Tea Room.
- Politicians Eat Dinner Together (한 끼 정치) - named after the JTBC variety show Let's Eat Dinner Together, Jung Kang-hyun interviews a politician while eating together. When Jung left the show, Kang Ji-young hosted this corner for a short while.
- Asian Cup Desk (아시안컵 회의) - a short-lived segment hosted by Yang Won-bo where he presents the latest happenings at the Asian Cup tournament.
- Reply Dajeonghwe (응답하라 다정회) - this was a segment where the cast answers questions from what viewers post on Facebook, Twitter, YouTube and their official website. It is similar to Social Live, but was broadcast everyday as opposed to Social Live where it is broadcast every other day (currently broadcast from Mondays-Thursdays). The title is a parody of the Reply series.
- Today's Speech (오늘의 발제) - this was a corner where the captains present their respective pieces briefly. It served as the newscast's opening.
- Lee Sang-bok's 60 Second Preview (복 국장의 60초 프리뷰)- a segment where Lee Sang-bok presents major political stories within one minute, similar to One-cut Politics.
- Yang's Interesting Politics (양 반장의 재미있는 정치) - this was Yang Won-bo's recurring segment before he was replaced by Cho Ik-shin, and is the same with Captain Cho's Presentation.
- Kang Ji-young's Talk Shooting Politics (강지영의 Talk쏘는 정치) - the sole segment held by announcer Kang Ji-young, she deals with light political topics and other social issues. Originally planned to be a segment in-between topics, it now airs at the end of each meeting. On Fridays, this corner is omitted because of the shortened runtime. This segment did not air from February 21, 2020, to cater to news related to the COVID-19 pandemic in South Korea, but eventually resumed airing on April 20, 2020. This corner doesn't air if Kang is absent. This segment has been officially replaced by Field Briefing starting May 18, 2020.
- Choi's Traveling Back in Time (최 반장의 시간여행) - a segment that shows past events related to ruling party leader Choi Jong-hyuk's article that day. It is similar to JTBC Newsroom's On This Day and SBS 8 News' Today in History, although different in approach. The two segments show historical events that happened on a certain day, while Choi's segment focuses on the presentation and the events related to the story that day.
- Chief Choi is Coming (최 반장이 간다) - a segment that shows Choi Jong-hyuk reporting breaking news. However, it is difficult to gather information and produce it like a news report. The two segments have officially been replaced by Check It Out and A Song for Something.
- Tea Party Hotline/Tea Party Invitation - this segment is not limited to one captain, but a corner in which someone conducts an interview via phone during the meeting. It is succeeded by Minute Call-Call.
- A Song For Something (최 반장의 '할말있송') - a new Friday-only segment where Choi Jong-hyuk asks viewers to select a song to be played within the show. It seems to be a reincarnation of Friday Tea Room and When Politics Meet Music. This segment was suspended due to the 56th Baeksang Arts Awards, but was not brought back even when the show proceeded as usual. It is the last music-related corner of the program.
- Ancient People (고때 고 사람들) - this Go Suk-seung segment is similar to Choi's Traveling Back in Time where he uncovers past events that are related to his presentation. Initially aired as a dry run on May 29, it became an official segment on June 1. Its debut as a recurring segment on June 3 featured fellow captain Shin Hye-won. The title is taken from the Korean name of the 2006 film The President's Last Bang. Ruling party leader Ryu Jeong-hwa brought back this segment as People at the Time (그때 그 사람들), the original title of the said Korean film.
- go! Go Go Sing! (go! 고고싱!) - originally named Go's Global TMI, He deals with news related to international politics instead of domestic politics. Go promised to deal with it one day at a time, but it appears two to three times a week.
- Check It Out (최키라웃) - a newly introduced segment where ruling party captain Choi Jong-hyuk delves on a controversial story and reads reactions from the YouTube live chat. It seems to be a spiritual successor to Responding Affectionately.
- Back in the Day (라떼는 말이야) - Choi Jong-hyuk will pull out an old clip of Lee Sang-bok reporting a certain story (mostly from his stint reporting in Washington), and usually begins it with 내가 그건 잘 아는데~ (which translates to "I know that very well").
- Dajeonghwe Theater (다정회 극장) - this is a segment where the captains work together to do a skit designed to inform and educate viewers. Every single captain has done this in their presentations except for Cho Ik-shin, but he has appeared in the other captains' skits before.
- Hidden Sync (히든싱크) - a parody of the South Korean variety show Hidden Singer.
- Lee Sang-bok's One-cut Politics (복 국장의 한 컷 정치) - similar to the segment 60 Second Preview, he presents major political news within one minute. It was abolished on January 7, 2019, and was eventually brought back on May 18, 2020, with his return to the show as his fixed segment. He goes to the other side of the set, presenting it beside a revolving monitor (which is also used by Morning&). It was once again abolished on December 4, 2020, and replaced with Bok-mark.
- Political Style (정치풍류가) - Ryu Jeong-hwa shows a lineup of names that could consider a possible run in the 2021 by-elections ala-Joseon dynasty.
- Kang Ji-young's Field Briefing (강지영의 현장 브리핑) - Kang Ji-young goes to interview people in this segment introduced on May 18, 2020. The debut of this segment was in commemoration of the 40th anniversary of the Gwangju Uprising. She was also declared Field Captain towards the end of the segment, with Lee Sang-bok presenting her the said badge. It is aired two times a week, but there are instances that it airs once a week (like on June 2, 2020, to give way for the 56th Baeksang Arts Awards). This is typically done on Mondays and Wednesdays. This corner is not done if Kang is absent. The segment officially ended on May 18, 2021, exactly a year after it debuted.
- Captain Ryu's Town Tour (류반장의동네한바퀴) - Ryu Jeong-hwa interviews politicians in this segment inspired by Politicians Eat Dinner Together and Jung's Separated Gaze. The segment premiered on February 3, 2021, with Seoul mayoral hopeful Park Young-sun as her first guest.
- Director Bok's Bok-mark (복국장의 복마크) - this segment similar to One-cut Politics and 60-Second Preview sees Lee Sang-bok report on major social issues within one minute, which typically ends the show. The name of this segment is derived from a bookmark. It can be cut off when there's breaking news or no time to do so. It ended on May 14, 2021, to prepare for the large-scale JTBC News reorganization.
- Captain Shin's Minute Call-Call (신 반장의 시시CallCall) - it is a segment introduced on May 19, 2020, where Shin Hye-won calls someone related to the issue presented that day before the broadcast, usually pre-recorded. It is a spiritual successor to Jung's Separated Gaze. Interim Blue House captain Ryu Jeong-hwa did a one-time parody of this segment, titled Captain Ryu's Minute Call-Call, which she brought back as her own segment on December 11, 2020, as By the Way (그나저나).
- New World (신 '세계') - a segment where Blue House captain Shin Hye-won reports on international issues. The name is derived from a wordplay of her surname. It is a spiritual successor to Go's Global TMI. Then-interim Blue House captain Ryu Jeong-hwa did a one-time parody titled Ryu World, which is a pun on her surname and the English name of the segment.
- Shin's Political School (신 반장의 정치스쿨) - a segment where Blue House leader Shin Hye-won delivers what is happening in the Blue House as if in a classroom, showing her proficiency in teaching, as she holds a certificate in secondary education. This segment hasn't aired for a long time, so it was classified as abolished. However, Shin clarified on the show's June 3, 2020 broadcast that it was never abolished.
- Shin's Unanswered Questions ('신' 조것이 알고싶다) - this segment hosted by Shin Hye-won has the same format as Cho's Unanswered Questions.
- Bokdeokroom Now (이 시각 복덕룸) - Shin Hye-won delivers news that parodies the 5-minute newscast Newsroom Now and merging segments The North Now (이 시각 노스(NORTH)룸), The Middle East Now (이 시각 중동룸) and The United States Now (이 시각 미국룸). In a previous broadcast, National Assembly captain Cho Ik-shin was heard pitching the idea to Shin, and officially debuted the segment on February 4, 2021.
- New Normal Life - stylized as NEWNORMALLIFE, Shin Hye-won details about life in the new normal in this new segment introduced on September 15, 2020.
- RyuTube (류트브) - ruling party leader Ryu Jeong-hwa shows a YouTube video that has significance with her presentation.
- Angryu Birds (앵그류버드)
- From Home to the World (집에서 세계속로) - Ryu Jeong-hwa will detail how other countries deal with different issues in this segment.
- By the Way (그나저나) - initially titled Captain Ryu's Minute Call-Call, Ryu Jeong-hwa calls a politician related to her presentation. This segment actually forced Lee Sang-bok and Shin Hye-won to become the villains during its debut.
- Issue Collection.zip (이슈모음.zip) - Ryu Jeong-hwa introduces political keywords like files on a computer in this segment introduced on December 30, 2020.
- People at the Time (그때 그 사람들) - originally titled Ancient People (고때 고 사람들), Ryu Jeong-hwa brought back this segment formerly by opposition leader Go Suk-seung where she uncovers past events that are related to her presentation.
- Ryu Quiz on the Studio (류키즈온더스튜디오) - a segment where Ryu Jeong-hwa quizzes on her co-cast members (including Lee Sang-bok) regarding issues. The segment debuted on January 14, 2021, and is derived from both New Kids on the Block and the Korean variety show You Quiz on the Block.
- Captain Cho's Presentation (조 반장 발제) - a segment where National Assembly leader Cho Ik-shin presents three to four news stories that can either be real events or rumors.
- Oh My Gosh, What's Wrong With You? (세상에 조런일이) - although not different from Captain Cho's Presentation and Yang's Interesting Politics, it deals with a part of Cho Ik-shin's presentation and asks what's wrong with it.
- Cho's Unanswered Questions (조것이 알고싶다) - a segment where Cho Ik-shin presents arguments as if doing an investigative journalism program. The name is derived from the popular SBS investigative journalism program of the same name. Blue House captain Shin Hye-won brought it back as Shin's Unanswered Questions ('신' 조것이 알고싶다).
- Stay in Together (같이들어박) - a spiritual successor to When Politics Meet Music, Park Joon-woo puts a musical spin on political issues in this segment.
- Entertainment Center (흥신소) - Park Joon-woo will play a clip from a movie that will provide context on his presentation.
- Captain Park's Bok-mark (박반장의 복마크) - Park Joon-woo presents news similar to the format of Bok-mark.
- Listening Together Park (전화해박) - a music-related segment where Park Joon-woo will detail politicians' feelings through songs, which inspired When Politics Meet Music, A Song for Something, and the Friday Tea Room.
- Playlist of the Past (슬기로운 과거탐구생활) - a segment where Park Joon-woo will pull out an old clip of a certain politician to include in his presentation. The title is taken from the Wise Life series, which includes Prison Playbook and Hospital Playlist.
- Captain vs. Captain (반장 대 반장) - a segment where the captains debate whether a certain action done on or by a politician is good or bad. This debuted on January 11, 2021, with Ryu Jeong-hwa moderating the proceedings.

== Presenters ==
The cast from May 18, 2020, until December 4, 2020. From left to right: Field captain Kang Ji-young, ruling party leader Choi Jong-hyuk, anchor Lee Sang-bok, National Assembly captain Cho Ik-shin, Blue House captain Shin Hye-won, and opposition leader Go Suk-seung

Political Desk premiered on April 7, 2014, hosted by Choi Sang-yeon, featuring Nam Gung-wook as Blue House captain, Yang Won-bo as head of the National Assembly, Oh Dae-young as head of the ruling party, and Lee Sung-dae as head of the opposition. Currently, the cast consists of anchor/moderator Lee Sang-bok, with Shin Hye-won, Cho Ik-shin, Ryu Jeong-hwa and Park Joon-woo representing the Blue House, National Assembly, ruling party and the opposition, respectively.

=== Cast ===
Role	Name	Duration	Position	Notes
Political Desk Director-General (정치부회의 국장)	Choi Sang-yeon 최상연	April 7, 2014—December 11, 2015	Deputy Director of Political Affairs, Press Production Bureau (보도제작국 정치담당 부국장)	He is now at JoongAng Ilbo's editorial committee.
Political Desk Director-General (정치부회의 국장)	Lee Sang-bok 이상복 The doctor who knows everything about nothing (모르는 게 없는 만물박사); Director Bok (복부장); Director-General Bok (복국장); Horse (말); Horseman (말부장); Overnight King (야근 대마왕); Bangtan Bok (방탄복); Chinese martial arts specialist (중국 무술 전문가); Marshmallow (마시마로)	December 14, 2015—January 3, 2020 May 18, 2020—present	Expert Committee Member (전문위원) (2020–present) Press Director (보도국장) (2018–2020); Director, Second Politics Division (정치2부장) (2015–2018)	The oldest of the cast, Lee has been teased by the captains for his signature hand gesture that made it become a staple in the show's opening IDs. He was a correspondent based in Washington before becoming the director for JTBC News' second political division (now named the Political Desk team) and later, the bureau's press director. He stepped down on January 3, 2020, to focus on the upcoming elections, but later returned on May 18, 2020, as he got promoted to JoongAng Media Holdings' executive committee. He is a big fan of boy band BTS, specifically Jimin, to which the captains (especially Yang Won-bo) tease him a lot for.
Political Desk Director-General (정치부회의 국장)	Park Sung-tae 박성태	January 6, 2020—May 15, 2020	Political Desk Team Leader (정치부회의팀장)	Before becoming Lee Sang-bok's successor, he was a popular fixture on JTBC Newsroom's Behind the News segment. Once he took the anchor chair, however, he was criticized by viewers for being too serious. He is currently a weekend editor and a part of the Issue Checkers in Newsroom.
News Checker (뉴스체커)	Nam Gung-wook 남궁욱	April 7, 2014—July 6, 2015	Reporter, Politics Division (정치부 기자)	He is currently JTBC's political editor and leader of the political team.
News Checker (뉴스체커)	Im So-ra 임소라 Korea's Helen Thomas (한국의 헬렌 토머스)	July 7, 2015—December 8, 2017	Reporter, Second Politics Division (정치2부 기자)	Im has filled in for JTBC Newsroom with Lee Sang-bok during the 2017 Chuseok holiday and is currently a reporter for the policy team, as well as a fill-in anchor. Im also became a regular on 3:10 Relay, where she joined fellow alumnus Yang Won-bo during Tuesdays. She is currently on the policy team, serving as the head of the coronavirus reporting team.
News Checker (뉴스체커)	Shin Hye-won 신혜원 Shintoto (신토토); Terrible performer (발연기)	December 11, 2017—present	Reporter, Political Desk Team (정치부회의팀 기자) (2019–present) Reporter, Second Politics Division (정치2부 기자) (2017–2019); Blue House captain (청와대 반장) (2017–2021)	Shin joined the show as its new Blue House captain after Im So-ra left on December 8, 2017, and is currently one of the show's youngest captains. Her MBTI personality type is ENTP.
Political Mentor (정치멘토)	Yang Won-bo 양원보 Master of political satire (정치 풍자의 달인); Jam-bo (잼보); Minion (미니언즈)	April 7, 2014—July 24, 2015; July 11, 2016—January 3, 2020 (as National Assembly captain) July 27, 2015—September 11, 2015 (as opposition leader)	Reporter, Political Desk Team (정치부회의팀 기자) (2019–2020) Reporter, Second Politics Division (정치2부 기자) (2016–2019) Reporter, Politics Division (정치부 기자) (2014–2016)	He was originally the National Assembly captain but became the opposition leader when Lee Sung-dae left, making Kim Jung-ha assume his vacated position. He then returned to his original position on July 11, 2016, staying there until January 3, 2020. He is known among fans of the show as the Minion because of his similar appearance to the animated characters. He is currently the deputy general manager of JTBC News' policy team and previously led the coronavirus reporting team. He is now the host of Scandal Supervisor, coming from his solo program 3:10 Relay and JTBC Newsroom segment Won-broadcast.
Political Mentor (정치멘토)	Kim Jung-ha 김정하	July 27, 2015—July 8, 2016	Reporter, Second Politics Division (정치2부 기자)	During Political Desk, he was Deputy General Manager of JTBC's Political Affairs Division. He's currently JoongAng Ilbo's Political Director, as well as International Affairs Director.
Political Mentor (정치멘토)	Cho Ik-shin 조익신	January 6, 2020—present	Reporter, Political Desk Team (정치부회의팀 기자) (2020–present) National Assembly captain (국회 반장) (2020–2021)	Currently the oldest of the cast, Cho is a former correspondent from JTBC News' first political division, and has appeared on the show during its early days as the interim National Assembly captain. His MBTI personality type is ENFP.
Situation Manager (상황실장)	Oh Dae-young 오대영	April 7, 2014—July 8, 2016	Reporter, Second Politics Division (정치2부 기자)	He hosted JTBC Newsroom's Fact Check segment from 2016 to 2019 and previously led the social issue and legal teams. He is also a frequent anchor for breaking news. He is currently Newsroom's main anchor, succeeding Seo Bok-hyun.
Situation Manager (상황실장)	Choi Jong-hyuk 최종혁 Tenacious young spirit (끈질긴 추격 젊은 패기); Psycho (돌+아이); Attention seeker (관종혁)	December 21, 2016—May 9, 2017 (as opposition leader) May 10, 2017—December 4, 2020 (as ruling party leader)	Reporter, Political Desk Team (정치부회의팀 기자) (2019–2020) Reporter, Second Politics Division (정치2부 기자) (2016–2019)	One of the show's youngest captains, Choi's outlandish antics make him the show's resident psycho. He's a fan of girl groups Twice and Red Velvet, even referencing it during the 2017 reorganization teaser. He originally joined the show as its opposition leader and youngest member, but became the ruling party leader at Lee Sang-bok's suggestion after Moon Jae-in was elected president, changing roles with then-ruling party leader Jung Kang-hyun. His MBTI personality type is ISFJ. He is now on the political team and hosts the Newsroom segment Back Briefing, succeeding Kim So-hyun.
Situation Manager (상황실장)	Ryu Jeong-hwa 류정화	December 7, 2020—present	Reporter, Political Desk Team (정치부회의팀 기자) (2020–present) Ruling party leader (여당 반장) (2020–2021)	She was previously a reporter for the international diplomacy and security team and has also filled in for other captains, such as Shin Hye-won. A viewer called her the second Jang Sung-kyu because of her crazy sense of humor. She is also the smallest of the cast.
Markman (마크맨)	Lee Sung-dae 이성대	April 7, 2014—July 24, 2015	Reporter, Politics Division (정치부 기자)	He was the original host of JTBC Newsroom's Behind the News segment, and later became a Blue House reporter during the Moon administration. He was often a host on Social Lives and teases Newsroom anchor Sohn Suk-hee. He's currently one of the deputy general managers of the political team, once sharing it with former opposition leader Jung Kang-hyun.
Markman (마크맨)	Yoo Sang-wook 유상욱	September 24, 2015—December 20, 2016	Reporter, Second Politics Division (정치2부 기자)	He is currently JTBC News' economic policy editor and leader of the policy team.
Markman (마크맨)	Jung Kang-hyun 정강현 Veteran political journalist (베테랑 정치기자); No-jam (노잼)	July 11, 2016—May 9, 2017 (as ruling party leader) May 10, 2017—July 13, 2018 (as opposition leader)	Reporter, Second Politics Division (정치2부 기자)	Jung was originally the ruling party leader, but switched places with then-opposition leader Choi Jong-hyuk at Lee Sang-bok's suggestion after Moon Jae-in was elected president. According to National Assembly captain Yang Won-bo, he seemed bitter about giving his position to Choi, who was then the show's youngest member. He's considered the show's no-jam character. His vast reporting experience was referenced on the 2017 reorganization teaser, as he was previously a culture reporter and JoongAng Ilbo's youth reporting team director before joining the show. He was one of the deputy general managers of the political team, sharing it with original opposition leader Lee Sung-dae. He is currently in training in the United States.
Markman (마크맨)	Go Suk-seung 고석승 No-jam (노잼); Gorotto (고로또)	July 16, 2018—-December 4, 2020	Reporter, Political Desk Team (정치부회의팀 기자) (2019–2020) Reporter, Second Politics Division (정치2부 기자) (2018–2019)	He's been frequently teased by the captains for being the no-jam character of the show, succeeding Jung Kang-hyun. He was a former host in JTBC Newsroom's segment Close Camera with fellow correspondents Ahn Ji-hyun and Park So-yeon before coming back on December 10, 2020, when he moved to the mobile issue team. His MBTI personality type is ESFJ.
Markman (마크맨)	Park Joon-woo 박준우	December 7, 2020—present	Reporter, Political Desk Team (정치부회의팀 기자) (2020–present) Opposition leader (야당 반장) (2020–2021)	He's previously a reporter for the mobile issue team.
Breaking News Captain (속보반장)	Kang Ji-young 강지영 Question queen (질문의 여왕); Glasses goddess (안경 여신); God Ji-young (갓지영)	July 13, 2015—June 4, 2021	Sub-anchor (서브 앵커) (2015–2020) Field captain (현장 반장) (2020–2021)	When Kang first joined the show, she was in charge of 40-second news. She then became a sub-anchor and fixed member in the show, hosting the segment Talk Shooting Politics from 2016 to 2020. She was then promoted to field captain on May 18, 2020, after her first Field Briefing segment. She was the longest-staying member of the show and the youngest of the cast. She is currently co-hosting Ssulzun Live with fellow Political Desk alumni Park Sung-tae and Lee Sung-dae.
Breaking News Captain (속보반장)	Baek Da-hye 백다혜	June 7, 2021—present		

=== Guest reporters ===
Name	Duration	Notes
Song Ji-young 송지영	April 7, 2014—unknown	It is unknown when she left JTBC, but she was involved in a controversy where she posted malicious comments regarding the CEO of a wedding consulting firm on various sites, accusing the club of giving them "bad-looking" albums despite acting on the complaint.
Han Yoon-ji 한윤지	October 6, 2014—October 28, 2014 January 26, 2015—February 6, 2015	She had a short stint on the show where she covered the National Assembly's audit and inspection sites, which became popular with viewers. She then had to fill in for both Lee Sung-dae and Yang Won-bo during their respective vacations before becoming a sub-anchor on the weekday edition of JTBC Newsroom.

== Broadcast times ==
Year	Date	Time	Reason
2014	April 7	16:00-17:00 KST	First broadcast as Report! Political Meeting at 4:00
2014	June 16	15:30-17:00 KST	Timeslot change, runtime extension to 90 minutes, lead-in to first part of JTBC News Site
2014	July 7	16:00-17:20 KST	Timeslot change, runtime reduction to 80 minutes
2014	September 22	17:10-18:30 KST	Timeslot change, lead-in to JTBC Newsroom's premiere
2018	April 16	17:10-18:25 KST	Runtime reduction to 75 minutes
2019	November 4	17:00-18:20 KST	Timeslot change, runtime extension to 80 minutes
2020	December 7	18:20-19:40 KST	Timeslot change
2021	June 7	16:30-18:00 KST	Timeslot change, runtime extension to 90 minutes
