= Seo Bok-hyun =

South Korean journalist and current JTBC Newsroom weekday anchor

- 서복현
- Born: 10 June 1983 (age 42); Jeonju, North Jeolla Province, South Korea
- Education: Korea University
- Occupations: News presenter, journalist
- Spouse: unknown (2015–present)

Seo Bok-hyun (born 10 June 1983) is a South Korean journalist and the former anchor of JTBC Newsroom.

== Biography ==
Seo graduated with a bachelor's degree in sociology at Korea University.

He started his career at MBN in 2010 as a reporter in its social affairs division before leaving for JTBC. He became known through his coverage of the Sewol ferry disaster, where he stayed for three months to cover the search for the network. After that, he moved to JoongAng Ilbo in July 2015 as part of a rotation schedule, then came back to JTBC in July 2016. He would then become part of a special report team assigned to initially investigate in the Mir and K-Sports foundations, but later uncovered evidence that Choi Soon-sil meddled in political affairs.

Seo was named as the new JTBC Newsroom presenter in December 2019, following then-presenter and current CEO Sohn Suk-hee's decision to step down. He had been persuaded multiple times by Sohn only to give in to his request, as he sees Seo to be a symbolic pillar and credible journalist despite having no previous presenting experience. He started his stint on 6 January 2020, being the youngest main presenter of a South Korean flagship newscast. He left Newsroom on 4 June 2021, following another large-scale JTBC News reorganization.

He made a cameo in the Academy Award-winning film Parasite as a reporter, and has been jokingly referred to as an "Oscar actor" by his colleagues.

== Career ==
=== Journalism ===
Duration	Network	Role
2010–2011	MBN	Reporter, Social Affairs Division
2011–2015; 2016–present	JTBC	Reporter, Political Division
2015–2016	JoongAng Ilbo	Reporter
2020–2021	JTBC	Presenter, JTBC Newsroom

=== Film ===
Year	Title	Role	Notes
2019	Parasite	Himself	Cameo

== Personal life ==
He got married in 2015 while serving as a JoongAng Ilbo reporter.
