= JTBC Newsroom =

- Titlecard for the weekday edition from April 6, 2020-June 6, 2021
- JTBC 뉴스룸
- Genre: News
- Created by: JTBC
- Developed by: JTBC News division
- Presented by: Weekdays: Han Min-yong; Choi Jae-won; Weekends: Ahn Na-kyung
- Narrated by: Weekdays: Han Min-yong (headlines)
- Country of origin: South Korea
- Original language: Korean

Production
- Camera setup: Multiple-camera setup
- Running time: 60 minutes (Weekdays, including commercials); 30 minutes (Weekends, including commercials)

Original release
- Network: JTBC
- Release: September 22, 2014 – present

JTBC Newsroom is the flagship nightly newscast of South Korean television network JTBC. The newscast is aired from 18:30-19:30 KST on weekdays and 18:20-18:50 on Saturdays and Sundays. JTBC Newsroom replaced two of its predecessors, JTBC News 10 and JTBC News 9. It is presented by Han Min-yong and Choi Jae-won on weekdays, and Ahn Na-kyung on weekends. Its origins can be traced back to the launch of JTBC News 10 in 2011, which was then renamed to JTBC News 9 when the program changed timeslots in 2012 and later went into its current name in 2014.

== History ==
=== Etymology ===
Sohn Suk-hee has clarified that the name of the program has nothing to do with the American drama The Newsroom, which he only watched for about ten minutes. He also pointed out that there are several other programs with the same name, including the ones from BBC News and CNN.

=== 2011: JTBC News 10 ===
It was launched on December 1, 2011, as JTBC News 10, together with the launch of the network itself. It was JTBC's first flagship newscast, which was then hosted by Jun Yong-woo and Cha Ye-rin. Unlike newscasts from the mainstream networks, JTBC News 10 is more focused on providing in-depth stories throughout the program. It was one of the pioneer programs of JTBC that time, usually having a 1% rating according to AGB Nielsen Korea.

=== November 2012—May 2013: JTBC News 10 becomes JTBC News 9 ===
On November 5, 2012, major programming revamp happened within the JTBC network. This included a major shift between drama and news programs. Its drama series were moved from 20:45/23:00 to 21:45, and its main newscast, JTBC News 10, became JTBC News 9. JTBC News 10 presenters Jun Yong-woo and Cha Ye-rin were abruptly replaced by Jun Young-gi and Hwang Nam-hee weeks before the 2012 South Korean presidential elections. Although it was titled JTBC News 9, it actually started at 20:50 KST. JTBC News 9 focused on news summaries similar to the mainstream networks, with some exclusive news features. It did not become that popular with viewers, as the newscast was placed third among general cable news programs, behind Channel A's Comprehensive News (now News A) and TV Chosun's News Show Pan (now News Nine).

=== May 2013: Sohn Suk-hee becomes head of JTBC News, takes over News 9 ===
On May 9, 2013, Sohn Suk-hee was named as the head of JTBC News division. He was considered the most prominent and the most influential news presenter in South Korea, having been with MBC for over three decades before leaving his post on MBC Radio. Another major revamp was made within the entire network programming, including more news and current affairs programs in the line-up, before he assumed the presenter post on 16 September. JTBC News 9 was shown at 20:55. Like its predecessor, JTBC News 10, JTBC News 9 focused more on in-depth reporting, increased live field reports and studio interviews. Its pilot episode rated 1.948%. Its ratings went up from the time that Sohn assumed the presenter post, rating between 1.5% and 2%, and it emerged as the number 1 general cable newscast. This was also the first time a song was used to end the newscast, with Bob Dylan's "The Times They Are a-Changin'" as its first ending theme.

=== April 2014: Sewol Ferry coverage and the rise in ratings ===
On April 16, 2014, Sohn's, and the whole network's credibility were tested when one of JTBC's reporters asked a very controversial question to one of the survivors of the Sewol ferry sinking. Sohn apologized on the presenter's behalf during the newscast's opening. Sohn's apology was praised online.

Ratings of JTBC News 9 went up during the coverage of the Sewol ferry accident. On 16 April, it had 1.81% and was the number 1 prime time news program among general cable networks. On 17 April, it went up to 2.5%. Not only it was the number 1 program among general cable stations, it was the only JTBC program which entered the top 20 general cable shows that day.

On 18 April, two days after the incident, Sohn interviewed deep sea diving expert Lee Jong-in. He talked the diving bell that could be used for search and rescue operations even in tough water conditions. Lee said that he tried to offer the diving bell and other diving equipment to the South Korean coast guard for its search efforts, but it had been declined. After the interview, online community sites were flooded with criticisms from outraged netizens in response to the government's slow response towards the incident. Several days later, the South Korean coast guard allowed the use of the diving bell. For the first time, JTBC News 9 surpassed the 3% mark, hitting 3.118%.

JTBC News 9 continued to dominate news ratings as it reached a new high of 4.35% on 21 April. Sohn Suk-hee was praised by viewers as he was the only news presenter who covered the search and rescue efforts live from Jindo. The newscast maintained its strength against other general cable newscast for the whole week as it rated 3.97% on the 22nd, 4.12% on the 23rd, 4.079% on the 24th and 3.735% on the 25th. In some cases, its ratings beat the combined ratings of TV Chosun, Maeil Broadcasting Network and Channel A's newscasts.

On 28 April, JTBC News 9 broke its own ratings record, achieving 5.06%, and threatened the main newscasts of MBC and SBS. Its ratings went up on the 29th as it reached 5.401%, beating MBC Newsdesk by 0.001%. So far, JTBC News 9 is the only general cable newscast to reach 5%.

=== September 2014: JTBC News 9 becomes JTBC Newsroom ===
It was announced in the second week of September that JTBC would revamp its news division, and the cancellation of JTBC News 9. It was replaced by JTBC Newsroom on 22 September. JTBC moved its main newscast from 21:00 KST to 20:00 KST, competing directly against MBC Newsdesk and SBS 8 News. To reflect the change, JTBC extended its main newscast from the usual 50 minutes to 100 minutes, a first for Korean television news. JTBC Newsroom focused on more live reports, studio interviews and more in-depth coverage of the day's news. JTBC Newsroom retained Sohn Suk-hee and Kim So-hyun as its presenters. The weekend edition, however, had Jeon Jin-bae and Lee Ji-eun as its new presenters. JTBC Newsroom is split into two parts, the first from 20:00 to 20:55 KST and the second from 21:00 to 21:40. JTBC also revamped its set and graphics package.

The launch of JTBC Newsroom was well received by viewers, rating 2.037% on its first night according to AGB Nielsen Korea, higher than the pilot broadcast of JTBC News 9 when Sohn took over a year before.

=== October 2016–2017: The Choi Soon-sil tablet PC exposé ===
JTBC assembled a special report team on October 3 to dig deeper into the Mir and K-Sports foundations, consisting of the then-weekend presenter and Director of Politics Division 1 Jeon Jin-bae, Director of Social Affairs Division 2 Son Yong-seok and reporters Shim Soo-mi, Kim Pil-joon, Seo Bok-hyun, Shin Hye-won, Kim Tae-young and Park Byung-hyun. Its first scoop was a series of interviews with a former employee who worked with the foundations, which were used as fronts for Choi Soon-sil's bribery operations. The anonymous employee provided testimony and evidence showing Choi met frequently with the various heads of Mir and K-sports.

On October 18, JTBC reported on a tablet PC allegedly belonging to Choi. The network claimed it was found abandoned but, six days later, revealed that it was in possession of the tablet. The contents were revealed over a 20-day period, which included pieces of sensitive government information. JTBC alleged that some members of the Blue House may have supplied Choi the information. Choi then denied the allegations in an interview with the Korean newspaper Segye Ilbo.

Over the next few days, JTBC focused on how Choi meddled with state affairs through showing how Choi edited then-president Park Geun-hye's speeches directly from the tablet, contradicting the original drafts supplied by ex-Blue House staffers. Go Young-tae, who was a former chairman in a company called The Blue K and a close aide to Choi, told JTBC in a June 19 interview that "the only thing Choi does well is to revise the president's speech." However, JTBC found out by examining the tablet that Choi also revised documents of President Park's remarks just hours before a meeting. Some of those former Blue House staffers came forward declaring their knowledge of Choi's involvement. Park apologized to the public on October 25, saying that she "relied on Choi in times of hardship". The same day, JTBC said it had turned over the tablet to prosecutors. At the time, prosecution declared they did not see a reason to investigate Choi, nor could they find her to be summoned for questioning.

On October 26, JTBC revealed digital evidence including e-mail trails of where the tablet files came from and registration information for the tablet, showing Choi probably received them from an ex-Blue House staffer, Kim Han-soo, a close friend of Choi's in-law. JTBC also proved the allegations that the tablet PC was indeed Choi's and that she had connections to what The Hankyoreh called "doorknob triumvirate". The same day, German police announced they had already been in the process of investigating Choi's German businesses and were trying to track her down for questioning over illicit business practices. A JTBC reporter (Lee Ga-hyuk) also ran a live broadcast that day from outside one of Choi's abandoned homes in Germany, knocking on the door and interviewing neighbors. Choi had apparently left her house in a hurry. Later, the prosecution admitted they were aware of Choi having foreign residences and the overseas investigation, contradicting their previous claim of not knowing where she was.

On December 8, a day before Park's impeachment trial, Shim Soo-mi appeared on Newsroom to explain how they obtained the tablet. Shim went to the abandoned office of The Blue K in Sinsa-dong with the real estate manager, who granted them access to the building. Reporters had secured testimony and circumstantial evidence that Choi had been there almost every day until early September. As a result, they found the tablet PC that Choi and Go left behind. The tablet was an early model of the Samsung Galaxy Tab series, which is now discontinued. Shim then bought a charger because the model was old and can't be charged with the current iterations of Samsung's chargers. She then put it back at the desk where she found it, but then suspected that Choi might ask someone to destroy the evidence. After an internal meeting, Shim decided to return to the building and obtain the tablet while copying the files inside it, then submit it to the prosecution. They recognized the crucial effect it could bring to the case. Shim brought it to the special report team's office on October 20, and spent the night with them doing a detailed analysis. The special report team found out that Choi was indeed involved in meddling with state affairs, and planned to submit it to the prosecution on the day their report was shown.

On December 11, prosecution presented concrete evidence that the tablet was indeed used by Choi.

=== December 2019—March 2020: JTBC Newsroom post-Sohn Suk-hee era ===
In December 2019, Sohn Suk-hee announced his resignation as presenter of JTBC Newsroom following a large-scale organization reshuffle. He had held this position for six years and four months, and would only focus on CEO duties. His final day was on January 2, 2020, during the second part of its annual New Year's Day debate. That broadcast recorded a rating of 4.9%. "The Times They Are a-Changin'" was used as its ending theme once more as he resigned from his position.

Seo Bok-hyun was named as his successor, and in his first day as the new presenter of Newsroom on 6 January 2020, he said that he would "uphold the four principles built on the newsroom" and would "do his best every day". Sohn's departure did not affect Newsroom's ratings, as it recorded a 4.3% nationwide rating on January 6, which is higher than the typical 3.4%-3.5% rating during Sohn's final week. However, weekday ratings fell to 2-4%, falling behind TV Chosun's News 9, while weekend ratings plunged to 1%, placing Newsroom last among its competitors. MBC Newsdesk absorbed all of Newsroom's viewership. Seo was the youngest presenter of a South Korean flagship newscast at 37.

Kim Pil-kyu also left his post on the weekend edition, following a promotion to become a Washington correspondent, making Han Min-yong the only presenter of the Friday to Sunday editions of Newsroom from January 10, 2020. This move made her the first sole female presenter and only the second main female presenter of a flagship JTBC newscast since 2014 (Ahn Chak-hee was the first), as well as one of the only two female presenters of a JTBC news or current affairs program, the other being Overnight Debate's Shin Ye-ri. This edition is shown at 18:55 KST on Saturdays and Sundays from February 15, 2020, making it the first time since 2017 to have its time slot changed. The weekend edition also had its run time shortened to 45 minutes.

On January 28, 2020, JTBC Newsroom's Fact Check segment was certified by the International Fact Checking Network for complying with its principles, making it the first Korean news organization to do so.

The February 23, 2020, broadcast was the last in the Trust B studio before moving to a temporary studio the next day. This marked JTBC's transition from the Trust Building in Digital Media City, which will now be used by JoongAng Ilbo, to the Creation Hall just beside it.

=== April 2020—June 2021: Move to Creation Hall and reorganizations ===
JTBC Newsroom moved to its new headquarters at JTBC Creation Hall at Digital Media City in Sangam-dong, Mapo District, South Korea and debuted its new set and graphics package on April 6, 2020. The weekday edition also changed in its background music, as well as the addition of new segments "A Fresh Look" (새로, 세로보다), a similar segment to "Anchor Briefing" with Seo Bok-hyun, and "Dr. Weather" (날씨박사), its first fixed weather segment hosted by the reporter and meteorologist Kim Se-hyun. This broadcast recorded a nationwide rating of 4.145%.

Seo Bok-hyun and Ahn Na-kyung presented the second part of JTBC News' special election coverage titled Our Choice 2020: Ask, Vote. on April 15, 2020. It was the network's first election coverage without Sohn Suk-hee. The live broadcast was also a lead-in to a special edition of Newsroom. Han Min-yong and her former co-presenter Kim Pil-kyu hosted its third part. The second part recorded an average nationwide rating of 1.691%, while the Newsroom special edition received 2.355%. The third part, on the other hand, was the coverage's highest-rated, with a nationwide rating of 2.469%. These numbers were dismal compared to past elections where Sohn was at the forefront.

On the commemoration of the 40th anniversary of the Gwangju Uprising, there was a special edition of Newsroom from Gwangju on May 17–18, 2020. Seo Bok-hyun and Ahn Na-kyung presented from the Gwangju special studio, while Han Min-yong joined them from Sangam-dong. The United Daily News newspaper in Taiwan, considered one of the country's largest, highlighted the effort to emphasize the event's significance in an article posted on its website. The May 17, 2020 broadcast had nationwide ratings of 2.073%, while the May 18 broadcast had 3.149%.

Starting on June 7, 2020, Behind Plus (비하인드+) is also broadcast on Sundays, hosted by former the Behind the News host Park Sung-tae who came from Political Desk and was its main presenter and team leader. The weekday edition was abolished on June 18, 2020, and was Park Min-kyu's last broadcast. It has since been replaced by Won-broadcast (원보가중계), starting on June 22, 2020. The segment is hosted by the former Political Desk National Assembly captain Yang Won-bo and reports on stories with a lighthearted tone. It was established after positive reactions from netizens, stemming from his appearances in the program.

On July 8, 2020, a new segment named "Economic Innovations" (발품경제) began, hosted by Lee Joo-chan of the consumer lifestyle team. He reports on economic-related issues and it is the first economy-centered segment since Saturday Plus and Sunday Plus.

On December 7, 2020, the show once again underwent reorganization with the first time slot change in the weekday edition in six years and a new Fact Check host, Choi Jae-won. He previously hosted the weekend edition of Behind the News before going to the investigative reporting team. Oh Dae-young (social issues), Jung Jae-yoon (international affairs) and Lee Seung-nyeong (economy) joined the show as well as Park Sung-tae (politics), whose "Behind Plus" segment ran on weekends. They are dubbed the "Issue Checkers", and will provide commentary and analysis on issues related to their respective beats. The weekday edition will now from Mondays to Fridays. Kim So-hyun will host a new segment called "Back Briefing", which succeeds "Won-broadcast".

A new youth-centered segment Goose News began on January 26, 2021, as well as a revived Cultural Invitation began on January 30, 2021.

=== June 2021—November 2022: Seo Bok-hyun leaves Newsroom, Oh Dae-young succeeds ===
Media Today first reported on May 25 that another large-scale JTBC News reorganization is scheduled to happen on June 7 in an effort to save the show from dismal ratings. Oh Dae-young is set to replace Seo Bok-hyun as main anchor, with both Ahn Na-kyung and Han Min-yong retaining their respective positions. Seo is now set to go back to reporting in the field after one year and four months. The newscasts moved temporarily from the Creation Hall studios to the Trust Building open studio to prepare for the reorganization. They debuted a new set, graphics package and theme music on June 7, 2021, with the latter taking the previous theme music's motifs and giving it a dynamic feel. The newscasts airing before it were also arranged as lead-ins to Newsroom. Newsroom was moved to a 7:30pm KST timeslot for an hour of runtime in a complete separation from its old 100-minute, 2-part format previously. They also debuted the Tracing Report Hook investigative reporting segment on this day.

The weekend edition was completely revamped to give it a "news show" feel highlighting various news and information, moving to a 6pm KST timeslot and using "Weekend @ 6" as its catchphrase. Junior reporters specifically assigned for weekend coverage were replaced with experienced ones to present in-depth reports in a creative format. This was met with internal criticism as reorganizations became frequent since 2020 with little changes to its viewership.

This was not enough to save Newsroom's continuing decline however, and was reorganized again on October 5, 2021 in preparation for the upcoming election season. The program was moved again to 7:15pm for a 75-minute runtime to give way for special election segments such as Camp Now, Ahn Ji-hyun's Reading Public Opinions, and Opinion Workman (a parody of Studio Lululala's web show Workman). When the parties' respective standard bearers declared their intentions to run for the country's highest office, these segments were further strengthened with the introductions of Camp Room (a parody of JTBC's variety show Movie Room), Debate Battle, National Scoring Team, and Presidential Pick. This prompted the revert of the program's previous start time at 7:30pm now extended until 9pm KST.

Opening titles began to be phased out November 2021 for regular segments like Close Camera, Tracing Report Hook and Fact Check, only leaving a titlecard for the newly minted sports news segment.

As the presidential and local elections passed, the program's start time changed again to 7:50pm KST and the runtime reverted to 60 minutes.

Another major reorganization loomed in the horizon with the program's third anchor change since 2020, with former Washington correspondent and then-head of news production Lim Jong-joo and weekend anchor Han Min-yong set to take over current presenters Oh Dae-young and Ahn Na-kyung on a yet-to-be-announced date, according to a Media Today report on July 5, 2022. However, Lim was appointed as an editor on the JoongAng Ilbo, putting the reorganization to a halt for the time being. This supposed move was aligned with the network's desire to go full digital while maintaining the news division's integrity.

=== November 2022—July 2023: Ssulzun Live hosts succeed Oh Dae-young, Han Min-yong; Open Newsroom introduced ===
On an October 21, 2022 report by Media Today, JTBC announces former Ssulzun Live anchors Park Sung-tae and Kang Ji-young to become Oh Dae-young and Han Min-yong's successors on the weekday and weekend edition respectively, with Ahn Na-kyung staying put as the weekday sub-anchor, a position she has held since 2016. The reorganization was set to take effect that November, which also included a brand new format every Friday where people can watch the program inside their headquarters live.

The reorganization kicked off November 14, 2022 with a new set and graphics package that replaced the old opening titlecard with a generic one. It also brought back the old Social Live format in Behind the Newsroom aired every weekdays. Meanwhile, Kang Ji-young hosted Newslice with a similar format as her old Ssulzun Live segment.

=== July 2023—present: Park Sung-tae, Ahn Na-kyung leave Newsroom; Han Min-yong, Choi Jae-won named successors ===
Mydaily reported about another anchor change, this time with both Park Sung-tae and Ahn Na-kyung leaving the program, the latter after nine years of being the sub-presenter, with seven of these in the weekday edition in the longest-serving Newsroom tenure ever. Former weekend anchor Han Min-yong returns to the anchor seat after a short stint as a co-host in the regular segment Yeouido and Seocho. She is joined by former Fact Checker Choi Jae-won as her sub-anchor, the first in Newsroom history. In addition, she is the youngest main anchor of a Korean flagship newscast ever, taking over just two days shy of her 34th birthday on July 19.

== Segments ==
There are two parts in JTBC Newsroom. The first consists of major news and interviews, along with the regular segments Close Camera and Economic Footprints. The second part focuses on the Back Briefing, News Briefing, Fact Check and Dr. Weather segments and other news not covered in the first part. The weekend edition does not follow the two-part format of the weekday edition. Action Camera, Open Mic (Saturday), and Behind Plus (Sundays) are weekend segments. The two-part system on weekdays got abolished following the June 2021 reorganization.

=== Current segments ===
==== Weekdays ====
- Close Camera (밀착 카메라) is a regular segment usually done by reporters from the social issues department (currently Lee Sang-yeop, Kwon Min-jae, Ham Min-jung, and Lee Hee-ryeong) on the weekday editions where they report on stories in-depth.
- Anchor Touch (앵커터치) is a new segment established on July 17, 2023 where Choi Jae-won analyzes the latest issues via a touchscreen panel.
- D:Issue (D:이슈) is a segment where the anchor analyzes stories that went viral on the Internet. It began on November 14, 2022.
- Sports News (스포츠) is the program's fixed sports news segment hosted by anchor Ahn Na-kyung beginning July 1, 2021 in time for the 2020 Summer Olympics. From November 14, 2022, the segment is hosted by reporter Lee Su-jin,
- Weather (날씨) is a segment previously done on JTBC News 9 where a weather forecaster presents the next day's weather in a typical green screen presentation. It is presented by former Sangam-dong Class weather presenter Kim Min-ji beginning July 17, 2023. Before that, weather forecaster Lee Jae-seung presented it in an analysis-style segment, which earned him the nickname "Weather Brother" among Newsroom viewers.

==== Weekends ====
- Cultural Interview (문화인터뷰) is a reincarnation of the popular segment Cultural Invitation (문화초대석) where popular figures in the arts and culture world appear for an interview.
- Newslice (뉴썰) is a web-only segment where Kang Ji-young dissects stories after the program ends. It seems to be a reincarnation of her Ssulzun Live segment.

==== Special segments ====
- There is an annual debate taking place every start of the New Year, where experts on different sectors talk about the events that may happen on that year. The 2020 edition was also Sohn Suk-hee's final discussion as presenter, leaving the position on January 2, 2020, following the second part of its annual New Year discussion. In the 2021 edition, however, he returned after a year. As he is now based in Japan, he hasn't done such discussions since.
- There are also urgent discussions held randomly, where the main presenter discusses different issues with a panel of experts.

=== Former segments ===
- News Keyword (뉴스 키워드) was a segment done by social issues reporter Lee Ji-eun (now in the industry team) where she analyzes a keyword related to a certain issue.
- Meticulous Economy (꼼꼼한 경제) was the first economy-centered segment since Newsroom started. It was established with the intention of "providing stories of everyday economics that we are curious about and analyze it for viewers' digestion." It was presented by Sung Hwa-sun and Lee Sae-nu-ri.
- Healing Report (힐링 리포트) was where reporters usually deliver positive news. Han Yoon-ji first presented this segment.
- Desk Briefing (데스크 브리핑) was where the reporter-in-charge analyzes the cause of an issue and its effect by answering questions from the presenter. Political reporters usually appear in this segment because of the mainly political news presented first. It has since stopped appearing during the 2016 South Korean political scandal.
- There was a segment specific for Lee Kyu-yeon's Spotlight (이규연의 스포트라이트) where viewers are briefed on what is going to be on the episode broadcast that week.
- Today (오늘) was a popular Newsroom segment that brings up past events through keywords, pictures and statements.
- Live Preview (미리 보는JTBC 뉴스룸 LIVE) was aired before the start of Newsroom where Ahn Na-kyung gives a preview on what's going to be on the news that day.
- Saturday Plus (토요 플러스) and Sunday Plus (일요 플러스) were special segments that became Meticulous Economy's spiritual successors, which aired once a week. It was stopped during the 2016 South Korean political scandal.
- Incident Plus (사건플러스) was a segment based on the JTBC News Morning& corner of the same name, which reports on a certain incident in-depth, with reports from all sides of the story. It aired on Thursdays, but was stopped due to the overwhelming workload of the Social Issues Team 3, which produces these reports.
- In Today's Newsroom (오늘 뉴스룸에서는) is similar to Live Preview, where Ahn Na-kyung briefs viewers on the news for that day. Exclusives are also previewed in this segment.
- Issue Check (이슈체크), later known as Newsroom Keywords (뉴스룸 키워드), was a weekend-limited corner where the presenter Kim Pil-kyu explains a certain story using keywords, mixing commentary and facts. It is similar to Sohn Suk-hee's Anchor Briefing, and A Fresh Look. The name Issue Check would actually be reused for its December reorganization.
- Report File 6001 (제보파일 6001) was a weekend-limited segment done by reporters from the Mobile Issue team. The title of this segment is taken from the last four digits of its anonymous tip landline.
- Anchor Briefing (앵커브리핑) was a segment where Sohn Suk-hee kicks off the second part of the broadcast with a commentary, similar to how an editorial works in a newspaper. It was one of the most popular segments during Sohn's tenure, and ended on December 31, 2019, before he left the anchor chair. This segment is similar to A Fresh Look.
- News Update (뉴스 업데이트) was where reporters would follow up stories that they have previously reported to see if there is anything needed to be followed up with, whether clarifying certain issues, interviewing people involved with it, or summarizing the news that have been reported during the first part.
- News Mission (뉴스 미션) was a segment similar to Close Camera where reporters of the Mobile Issue team is tasked to do a mission and check for themselves about contents that piques viewers' curiosity. It is succeeded by Action Camera.
- Issue Plus (이슈플러스) was focused on in-depth reporting, similar to Exploration Plus.
- Exploration Plus (탐사 플러스) was a recurring segment similar to Close Camera. The Exploration Plus team work closely with the Close Camera team.
- A Fresh Look (새로, 세로보다) was a segment presented by Seo Bok-hyun where he opens the newscast with a commentary on a certain issue. It is similar to Sohn Suk-hee's Anchor Briefing segment during his Newsroom tenure, but with a less aggressive approach. It has been suspended to give way to other stories that have been pushed aside due to continuing coverage or to conduct interviews, and was eventually stopped.
- Won-broadcast (원보가중계) was a segment done by former Political Desk National Assembly captain Yang Won-bo starting on June 22, 2020, where he tackles on two to three different stories with a lighter tone, reminiscent of his old Dajeonghwe (a nickname for Political Desk) segments. It was established after positive reactions from netizens during his multiple appearances in the program. It kicks off the second part of the weekday edition. 3:10 Relay can be considered the segment's sister program. It is succeeded by Back Briefing.
- Issue Check (이슈체크) is a segment established on December 7, 2020, where reporters from different departments explains issues related to their respective beat. There was a segment of the same name and similar nature before hosted by Kim Pil-kyu, but it was later renamed to Newsroom Keywords.
- Dr. Weather (날씨박사) is a regular segment where meteorological reporter Kim Se-hyun gives weather forecasts, as well as analysis on weather-related events, typically situated just before the end of the broadcast. It is Newsroom's first fixed weather segment. When there is a major weather report, it can air on weekends, and on the first part during weekdays. If it is omitted on weekdays, it can be replaced by a typical weather brief by the presenter. From August 2020 until December 2020, it is occasionally held on Fridays with Han Min-yong, then integrated with the Friday edition following the December 2020 reorganization. It ended on June 4, 2021.
- Action Camera (액션카메라) is a segment similar to Close Camera where reporters from the weekend coverage team cover different social issues. The successor of News Mission, this segment originally premiered on June 7, 2020, but went on hiatus until December 20, 2020.
- Back Briefing (백브리핑) is a segment hosted by former anchor and Blue House reporter Kim So-hyun, which combines the formats of Won-broadcast and Behind Plus. Kim So-hyun left her post on June 3, 2021, with former Political Desk ruling party leader Choi Jong-hyuk succeeding her on June 7. A weekend edition also began airing around the same time hosted by Park Jin-kyu.
- Goose News (구스뉴스) is a Friday-only segment that debuted on January 26, 2021, where Jeong Jae-woo and Lee Soo-jin deal with concerns related to the youth.
- Anchor Comment (앵커코멘트) is a segment inspired by the popular Anchor Briefing segment where anchors add short comments in the form of briefings regarding major issues. It debuted on June 9, 2021.
- Next on Newsroom (잠시 후 뉴스룸) is a segment where Ahn Na-kyung previews upcoming reports, with the last item usually previewing the Close Camera segment that will air later in the show.
- Tracking Hook (추적보도 훅) is a segment where reporters from different departments investigate major issues in-depth, similar to the Exploration Plus segment during the first few years of Newsroom.
- Ending Theme (클로징BGM) - the broadcast usually ends with a song chosen by the main presenter. This tradition started when Sohn Suk-hee became presenter of JTBC News 9 back in 2013, and has continued on with Seo Bok-hyun succeeding his position in Newsroom, although Sohn and Seo's tastes in music vary differently. This also appears in the weekend edition as well starting February 14, 2020, with songs chosen by the presenter Han Min-yong. Some of the anchors' chosen English-language ending themes have been removed from YouTube due to copyright issues, thus shifting their song choices to Korean-language ones.
- Fact Check (팩트체크) is a regular segment where Choi Jae-won fact-checks statements given by prominent figures, or give an in-depth explanation on a certain topic. This first-ever fact-checking segment became popular with viewers due to its back-to-basics nature, with past hosts including current Washington correspondent Kim Pil-kyu, current anchor Oh Dae-young (who both came from another popular show, Political Desk, with Kim creating the show and Oh serving as its original ruling party leader) and national team reporter Lee Ga-hyuk. Two of this segment's hosts became main anchors of the show. The segment airs every Tuesdays and Thursdays.
- Han Min-yong's Open Mic (한민용의 오픈마이크) is a Saturday-only segment where Han Min-yong usually goes out to conduct in-depth field reports and interviews, similar to Close Camera. Han has expressed that she wanted to change the name of the segment to a different one during a Social Live episode.
- News Briefing (뉴스브리핑) is a weekend-only segment where Han Min-yong gives brief summaries of domestic and foreign stories. It used to be part of the weekday Newsroom before the June 2021 reorganization, with Ahn Na-kyung hosting the segment.
- Behind Plus (비하인드+) is another regular segment where Park Min-kyu tells Seo Bok-hyun about the process that goes into the reports journalists produce. It is a so-called upgraded version of former segment Behind the News (비하인드뉴스), a popular segment during Sohn Suk-hee's tenure. It has started appearing on Sundays beginning June 7, 2020, hosted by Park Sung-tae, who previously hosted the weekday edition from 2017 to 2019 before he left to host Political Desk. The weekday edition was abolished on June 18, 2020, leaving only the weekend edition to continue airing. It can be omitted when there is breaking news or when there's Cultural Invitation. Jung Jong-moon officially replaced Park Sung-tae as the new host on December 27, 2020, after Park left to become an Issue Checker. Jung Jong-moon left on May 23, 2021, as he was reassigned to the social issues department. Park Jin-kyu is now doing the segment by himself starting May 30, 2021.
- Footprint News (발품뉴스), formerly called Economic Footprints (발품경제), is a Saturday-only segment established on July 8, 2020, where Yoon Jung-shik reports on economic-related issues. It is the first economy-centered segment since Saturday Plus and Sunday Plus and is similar to Close Camera. Lee Joo-chan used to present the segment but got assigned to the national department following the June 2021 reorganization.
- Cultural Invitation (문화초대석) is an irregular segment where the anchor interviews artists, typically situated towards the end of the broadcast. It was a popular segment before its hiatus, and was brought back on the weekends on January 30, 2021, with Cho Sung-jin as the first guest. It was reincarnated during Kang Ji-young's tenure as Cultural Interview (문화인터뷰).

== Broadcast times ==
JTBC Newsroom is being aired on all cable and satellite systems in South Korea from 19:55 – 21:30 KST. It is also being aired live through the JTBC NOW app, JTBC News's YouTube channel, KakaoTV, Naver TV, and Nate.

Channel	Program Title	Broadcast Period	Broadcast Duration	Notes
JTBC	JTBC News 10 (JTBC 뉴스10)	December 1, 2011—November 2, 2012	Monday-Friday 21:50-22:50 KST (60 minutes)	first broadcast
JTBC	JTBC News 9 (JTBC 뉴스9)	November 5, 2012—September 13, 2013	Monday-Friday 20:50-21:40 KST (50 minutes)	runtime reduction; title change
JTBC	JTBC News 9 (JTBC 뉴스9)	September 16, 2013—October 18, 2013	Monday-Friday 20:55-21:40 KST (45 minutes)	runtime reduction
JTBC	JTBC News 9 (JTBC 뉴스9)	October 21, 2013—September 19, 2014	Monday-Friday 20:55-21:45 KST (50 minutes)	runtime extension
JTBC	JTBC Newsroom (JTBC 뉴스룸)	September 22, 2014—July 12, 2015	Monday-Friday 20:00-21:40 KST (100 minutes) Saturday-Sunday 20:00-20:30 KST (30 minutes)	first broadcast with current title
JTBC	JTBC Newsroom (JTBC 뉴스룸)	July 13, 2015—December 6, 2020	Monday - Thursday 19:55-21:30 KST (95 minutes); Friday 19:55-21:00 KST (65 minutes) Saturday-Sunday 18:55-19:40 (45 minutes)	runtime extension, weekend system extended to Fridays
JTBC	JTBC Newsroom (JTBC 뉴스룸)	December 7, 2020—June 4, 2021	Monday-Thursday 19:40-21:00 KST (80 minutes) Friday 19:40-20:45 (75 minutes) Saturday-Sunday 19:00-19:40 (40 minutes)	runtime reduction and timeslot change on weekdays, revert to weekday-weekend system
JTBC	JTBC Newsroom (JTBC 뉴스룸)	June 7, 2021—present	Monday-Friday 19:30-20:30 KST (60 minutes) Saturday-Sunday 18:00-18:40 KST (40 minutes)	runtime reduction and timeslot change

== Presenters ==
Note: When the weekday presenter/s is/are absent, the weekend presenter/s replace/s them and vice versa.

Role	Name	Duration	Notes
Main presenter (weekday)	Jun Yong-woo 전용우	April 7, 2014—December 10, 2012	
Main presenter (weekday)	Jun Young-gi 전영기	December 11, 2012—September 13, 2013	
Main presenter (weekday)	Sohn Suk-hee 손석희	September 16, 2013—January 2, 2020	He was instrumental in JTBC News' reform as a serious and trusted news organization. He left his presenter post on January 2, 2020, after six years and four months. After his stint as president and CEO, he is now a special correspondent based in Japan. He was referred to by Ahn Na-kyung as a tsundere during her appearance in Abnormal Summit.
Main presenter (weekday)	Seo Bok-hyun 서복현	January 6, 2020—June 4, 2021	He was one of the reporters who extensively covered the Sewol ferry disaster and the 2016 South Korean political scandal. He was part of the special report team that discovered Choi Soon-sil's tablet, which became instrumental in the impeachment of then-President Park Geun-hye. Sohn Suk-hee chose him to be his successor after continuous persuasion, despite having no experience at presenting whatsoever. He also formerly held the distinction of being the youngest presenter of Newsroom and of any South Korean network's flagship newscast until former weekend anchor Han Min-yong took over in July 2023. He had a cameo in the Academy Award-winning film Parasite with Shim Soo-mi, and has been known inside the newsroom as an "Oscar actor".
Main presenter (weekday)	Oh Dae-young 오대영	June 7, 2021—November 11, 2022	He hosted the show's Fact Check segment from 2016 to 2019 and previously led the social issue and legal teams. He is also a frequent anchor for breaking news. He was also part of the original Political Desk cast, serving as their ruling party leader.
Main presenter (weekday)	Park Sung-tae 박성태	November 14, 2022—July 14, 2023	He has been a mainstay at JTBC newscasts since 2014 until recently hosting Ssulzun Live with Lee Sung-dae and Kang Ji-young. In addition, he was a JTBC Newsroom fixture, gaining fame for his Behind the News segments both weekday and weekend, and a former Political Desk host until May 2020.
Main presenter (weekday)	Han Min-yong 한민용	July 17, 2023—present	She has been a fixture in the show's weekend edition, beginning from August 2018 as a sub-anchor and ascending to main anchor status in January 2020, which she maintained until November 2022. After that, she co-hosted the fixed Yeouido and Seocho segment with Shin Hye-won until July 2023. She is currently the youngest main anchor of a Korean flagship newscast, taking over just two days shy of her 34th birthday, as well as the program's first female main anchor of both the weekday and weekend editions.
Sub-presenter (weekday)	Cha Ye-rin 차예린	December 1, 2011—December 7, 2012	She is currently a freelance announcer affiliated with MBC.
Sub-presenter (weekday)	Hwang Nam-hee 황남희	December 11, 2012—September 13, 2013	She was the former co-presenter for JTBC News Morning&, leaving in early 2022 for a stint at their news bulletin Newsroom Now, a position she held until June 30, 2023. She is currently the deputy director for the announcer team.
Sub-presenter (weekday)	Kim So-hyun 김소현	September 16, 2013—July 10, 2015	She's currently a correspondent for the network.
Sub-presenter (weekday)	Han Yoon-ji 한윤지	July 13, 2015—April 14, 2016	She was a former correspondent and also joined Political Desk for a while until becoming the program's sub-presenter in 2015. She has left the program since and is residing in Kuwait. She has appeared multiple times since her departure.
Sub-presenter (weekday)	Ahn Na-kyung 안나경	January 3, 2015—April 10, 2016 (as weekend sub-presenter) April 18, 2016—July 14, 2023 (as weekday sub-presenter)	She was the presenter of its sports segment before being a sub-presenter for its weekend edition in January 2015. She then became a co-presenter for its weekday edition starting on April 18, 2016, and has stayed there until July 14, 2023. She appeared as a special guest in Knowing Bros and Abnormal Summit. She is the show's longest-serving anchor, being its sub-presenter for nine years, with seven done during her weekday stint.
Sub-presenter (weekday)	Choi Jae-won 최재원	July 17, 2023—present	He joined JTBC in 2018 after his 2017 stint at Channel A, where he hosted the weekend edition of their flagship newscast Comprehensive News from February to October of that year. At JTBC, he hosted the weekend edition of popular Newsroom segment Behind Plus until the January 2020 reorganization, then in December 2020, he succeeded Lee Ga-hyeok as the new host of another popular segment Fact Check. He is the former chairperson of the JTBC-JoongAng Ilbo labor union from January 2022 until January 2023.
Main anchor (weekend)	Lee Jeong-heon 이정헌	December 3, 2011—April 29, 2012	He is the former co-presenter of JTBC News Morning& and the team leader for News Production Team 2, which produces the show. He is now a politician affiliated with the Democratic Party.
Main anchor (weekend)	Ahn Chak-hee 안착히	May 5, 2012—March 30, 2014	She was JTBC News' first female main presenter and is now the global collaboration team leader for JoongAng Ilbo.
Main anchor (weekend)	Park Sung-tae 박성태	April 5, 2014—September 21, 2014	He was a former host of Newsroom's segment Behind Plus (previously Behind the News) before assuming the presenter post at Political Desk. After his Ssulzun Live stint with Lee Sung-dae and Kang Ji-young, he succeeded Oh Dae-young as the new main anchor. He left the show after eight months on July 14, 2023.
Main anchor (weekend)	Jeon Jin-bae 전진배	September 27, 2014—August 13, 2017	He was the former director of the first politics division and was a part of the special report team that investigated the connections between Park Geun-hye and Choi Soon-sil. He left JTBC in 2019 but after his stint as the executive vice president of strategic planning at Hanwha Group, he returned to oversee the network's news division in 2022 and is now its president and CEO.
Main anchor (weekend)	Kim Pil-kyu 김필규	August 18, 2017—January 5, 2020	He created and produced Political Desk in 2014 before assuming the post in 2017 following Jeon Jin-bae's departure. He was also the head of the weekend coverage team and the deputy director of the political team. He is now a correspondent based in Washington, D.C., months after the coronavirus outbreak forced the network to postpone his deployment.
Main anchor (weekend)	Han Min-yong 한민용	August 3, 2018—January 5, 2020 (as sub-presenter) January 10, 2020—November 13, 2022 (as main presenter)	She joined JTBC in 2017 after four years at MBN. She became a sub-presenter in August 2018, less than a year after joining. She got promoted to main presenter after Kim Pil-kyu's departure in 2020, and was only the second female main presenter of a JTBC newscast, as well as the first sole female presenter of a JTBC flagship newscast. She also hosted the weekly segment "Open Mic" on Saturdays, where she uses her reporting experience to cover different stories. She is now the host of its weekday edition beginning July 2023.
Main anchor (weekend)	Kang Ji-young 강지영	November 19, 2022—present	She gained fame thanks to her long Political Desk tenure lasting from 2015 to 2021, where she then joined Park Sung-tae and Lee Sung-dae in hosting the short-lived Ssulzun Live before being named as Han Min-yong's successor in the weekend edition.
Sub-presenter (weekend)	Ahn Tae-hoon 안태훈	November 24, 2012—February 2, 2014	He's currently a reporter for the economic department.
Sub-presenter (weekend)	Lee Ji-eun 이지은	September 27, 2014—December 28, 2014 April 15, 2016—July 29, 2018	She is a reporter for the international affairs department and shares the same name as another reporter from the same team (now in the economic department). She left her position in 2018 for training and was succeeded by Han Min-yong.

== See also ==
- KBS News 9
- MBC Newsdesk
- SBS 8 News
