= Scandal Supervisor =

South Korean television program

- Hangul: 사건반장
- Hanja: 事件班長
- RR: Sageon banjang
- MR: Sakŏn panjang
- Genre: Current affairs
- Created by: JTBC
- Presented by: Yang Won-bo; Kim Ha-eun
- Country of origin: South Korea
- Original language: Korean
- No. of episodes: 1,528

Production
- Production location: South Korea
- Running time: 80 minutes

Original release
- Network: JTBC
- Release: September 22, 2014 – present

Scandal Supervisor (Korean: 사건반장; lit. 'Case Chief') is a South Korean current affairs program airing on JTBC. It airs Monday to Fridays at 19:50-20:50 KST and is presented by Yang Won-bo and Kim Ha-eun. The broadcast does not use the same color palette as other JTBC newscasts, but it has used the JTBC News design since February 2017.

== Background ==
Three issues are presented each day through the Today... segments, and four other events are dealt with briefly through the Crime Scene corner.

=== Current segments ===
- Incident Situation Room (사건상황실) - formerly called Crime Scene (사건 현장), Kim Ha-eun hosts this segment that reports about minor incidents.
- Today's Incident # (오늘, 사건 #) - this segment deals with a certain incident that happened that day.
- Today's Law # (오늘., 법 #) - this segment will delve into a certain law involving an incident.
- Today's Person # (오늘, 인물 #) - this segment analyzes a person's involvement in an incident.
- Incident X-Files (사건 X파일) - this segment introduces famous historical events.
- Crime Scene (사건 현장) - this segment is presented ala-3:10 Relay, where the panel will analyze a clip as it plays on the screen.
- Scandal Supervisor Family Desk (사반 가족회의) - this web-only segment premiered on April 13, 2021 right after the broadcast. Anchor Yang Won-bo is joined by attorney Park Ji-hoon and reporter Hong Ji-yong on Tuesdays, while attorney Baek Sung-moon and reporter Lee Do-sung join on Thursdays.

==== Scandal Supervisor Family Desk segments ====
- Scandal Supervisor Replay (사반 다시보기) is a segment that introduces the top story in detail while reading comments from the live chat.
- Scandal Supervisor Preview (사반 미리보기) is a segment that previews the top story that will air on the broadcast the next day.
- Today's Agenda (오늘의 안건) is a segment that deals with trending topics on the Internet or viewer-submitted content.

=== Former segments ===
- The World Where We Live In - formerly the fifth main segment, this segment presents stories of people who have done good in the society, a contrast to the heavy atmosphere brought by the cases/issues in the previous segments.
- Relationship Office - this former sixth main segment deals with stories sent by viewers.
- Pyo Chang-won's Question Mark (표창원의 물음표) - anchor Pyo Chang-won delivers his opening brief about the top story that will be covered on Today's Incident #1.
- Today's Incident (사건 오늘) - the panel talk about top issues that day divided into four corners.
- Pyo Chang-won's Period (표창원의 마침표) - Pyo Chang-won will deliver a closing commentary based on the top story that day.
- Out with the Old, In with the New (헌 법 줄게 새 법 다오) - anchor Pyo Chang-won discusses controversial laws with the panel in this Monday-only segment.
- Incident Montage (사건 몽타주) - this Tuesday-only segment explores the central character of the case covered on Today's Incident #1, and analyzes the case through the person mentioned.
- Incident Investigation Group (사건 역학조사단) - this Wednesday-only segment seems to delve into why and how a certain incident happened in-depth with experts from different backgrounds.
- Historical Theories (사건 평행이론) - this Thursday-only segment tackles a certain historical event and analyzes how much has changed since the event happened.
- Case Investigation Institute (사건 수사연구소) - this Friday-only segment investigates events scientifically with experts. It seems to be similar to the Wednesday segment Incident Investigation Group .

== Panel ==
It is currently presented by Yang Won-bo, with Kim Ha-eun presenting the Crime Scene segment. The panelists have been reduced to two from four due to the reorganization, but on December 7, social affairs reporters Lee Do-sung and Gong Da-som joined the panel, making the panelists four. Sometime in 2021, Gong Da-som left the panel and was replaced by Hong Ji-yong from the same team.

=== Current fixed panelists ===
- Hong Ji-yong, JTBC social affairs reporter
- Lee Do-sung, JTBC social affairs reporter
- Baek Sung-moon, lawyer (Mondays and Thursdays)
- Park Ji-hoon, lawyer (Tuesdays)
- Sohn Soo-ho, lawyer (Wednesdays)
- Yang Ji-yeol, lawyer (Fridays)

=== Former panelists ===
- Choi Young-il, critic
- Jang Hee-young, critic
- Kim Bok-joon, researcher at Korea Institute of Criminology
- Jung Jin-ho, JoongAng Ilbo social affairs reporter
- Lee Ji-hye, JTBC legal team reporter
- Kim Joon-il, NewsTop reporter
- Park Jung-ho, OhmyNews reporter
- Kim Hyung-sun, Naeil Shimun reporter

Anchor	Duration	Notes
Park Jong-kwon	September 22, 2014 – December 31, 2015	
Park Sung-joon	January 4, 2016 – January 10, 2020	Ran for a seat in the National Assembly
Im Kyung-jin	November 17–18, 2017; September 9–11, 2019	fill-in anchors
Park Ji-hoon	January 13, 2020 – January 23, 2020	fill-in anchors
Park Hye-jin	January 28, 2020 – April 10, 2020	Freelance announcer
Song Min-kyo	April 13, 2020 – July 17, 2020	
Pyo Chang-won	July 20, 2020 – December 4, 2020	Current head of the Pyo Chang-won Institute of Crime Science
Yang Won-bo	December 7, 2020 – present	former Political Desk National Assembly captain and host of 3:10 Relay; current JTBC policy team general manager
