= 3:10 Relay =

JTBC afternoon newscast

- Titlecard featuring anchor Yang Won-bo
- Also known as: 310 중계석
- Genre: News, satire
- Presented by: Yang Won-bo
- Country of origin: South Korea
- Original language: Korean
- No. of episodes: 90

Production
- Production location: South Korea
- Editor: 35 minutes
- Camera setup: Multiple-camera setup

Original release
- Network: JTBC
- Release: 20 July – 4 December 2020

3:10 Relay (Korean: 310 중계석; Hanja: 310 中繼석; RR: 310 junggyeseok; MR: 310 chunggyesŏk) was a South Korean newscast airing on JTBC in 2020. With the concept of a sports program, it puts a funny spin on domestic and foreign stories using entertaining editing and captions. It is presented by Yang Won-bo and airs weekdays at 3:10 KST. Its final episode aired on 4 December, with anchor Yang Won-bo set to take over Pyo Chang-won in Scandal Supervisor.

== Segments ==
- Opening – Yang Won-bo introduces the stories in Today's Headlines and ends it with showing the rating for the previous day (this has been abolished on 14 October).
- Today's Headlines – originally named Observation Point (관전 포인트), this segment is divided into three where the stories are broken down.
- Real-time Relay – the casters check the top 10 real-time trends on Naver as of broadcast time.

== Commentators ==
Role	Day	Name	Duration	Notes
Caster (캐스터)	Everyday	Yang Won-bo 양원보	20 July 2020—4 December 2020	
Commentator (해설위원)	Mondays and Wednesdays	Go Hyun-joon 고현준	Monday commentator: 20 July 2020—28 September 2020 Wednesday commentator: 22 July 2020—16 September 2020 One-day commentator: 14 August 2020	Current host of Go Hyun-joon's News Briefing on SBS Love FM
Commentator (해설위원)	Mondays only	Kim Kyung-jin 김경진	12 October 2020—30 November 2020	member of the 20th National Assembly, representing Buk District, Gwangju under the People's Party
Commentator (해설위원)	Tuesdays only	Lee Jong-hoon 이종훈	21 July 2020—4 August 2020	Writer
Commentator (해설위원)	Tuesdays only	Im So-ra 임소라	18 August 2020—1 December 2020 One-day commentator: 13 August 2020	JTBC political reporter, former Political Desk Blue House captain
Commentator (해설위원)	Thursdays only	Jeon Min-gi 전민기	23 July 2020—6 August 2020	Sociologist
Commentator (해설위원)	Wednesdays and Thursdays	Park Sung-tae 박성태	Thursday commentator: 27 August 2020—3 December 2020 Wednesday commentator: 23 September 2020—2 December 2020	JTBC weekend editor, former Political Desk anchor
Commentator (해설위원)	Fridays only	Kang Chan-ho 강찬호	24 July 2020—13 November 2020	JoongAng Ilbo editorial writer

=== Guest commentators ===
Name	Duration	Notes
Ryu Ho-jeong 류호정	11 August 2020 (one-day commentator)	member of the 21st National Assembly representing the Justice Party
Choi Soo-yeon 최수연	20 August 2020; 4 September 2020; 9, 16 October 2020; 4 December 2020	JTBC political reporter
Lee Soo-jin 이수진	30 October 2020; 20 November 2020; 2 December 2020	JTBC society reporter
Lee Ja-yeon 이자연	27 November 2020	JTBC weekend reporter

== Ratings ==
In the ratings below, the highest rating for the show will be in red, and the lowest rating for the show will be in blue each year.

=== Series overview ===
Year	Episodes	Originally aired	
Year	Episodes	First aired	Last aired
2020	90	20 July 2020	4 December 2020

=== 2020 ===
List of ratings in 2020 (episode 1–57, before ratings showing halt)

Ep. #	Broadcast date	Average audience share	
Ep. #	Broadcast date	AGB Nielsen	
Ep. #	Broadcast date	Seoul Metropolitan Area	Nationwide
1	20 July	0.7%	0.696%
2	21 July	0.5%	NR
3	22 July	0.6%	0.776%
4	23 July	1.0%	NR
5	24 July	0.8%	1.011%
6	27 July	0.7%	0.583%
7	28 July	0.8%	0.819%
8	29 July	0.9%	0.826%
9	30 July	0.7%	0.787%
10	31 July	1.0%	0.885%
11	3 August	0.7%	0.71%
12	4 August	0.6%	NR
13	5 August	1.2%	1.006%
14	6 August	1.1%	1.085%
15	7 August	N/A (Note: No ratings for the Friday broadcast was released due to the 10 August 2020 broadcast being preempted to give way to breaking news coverage of typhoon Jangmi. It was temporarily replaced by an extended Jun Yong-woo's News ON.)	N/A
16	11 August	1.0%	0.858%
17	12 August	0.5%	0.698%
18	13 August	1.2%	0.89%
19	14 August	N/A (Note: The country declared 17 August as a temporary national holiday, hence none of the afternoon newscasts aired their respective episodes. The ratings for the 14 August broadcast wasn't released.)	0.553%
20	18 August	0.8%	0.838%
21	19 August	1.0%	1.003%
22	20 August	1.3%	1.159%
23	21 August	0.7%	0.826%
24	24 August	0.5%	0.818%
25	25 August	0.9%	0.926%
26	26 August	1.0%	0.953%
27	27 August	1.4%	1.317%
28	28 August	1.0%	0.924%
29	31 August	0.5%	0.616%
30	1 September	0.9%	0.869%
31	2 September	0.7%	0.674%
32	3 September	1.1%	1.17%
33	4 September	N/A (Note: All the afternoon newscasts except for Political Desk have been preempted to give way for breaking news coverage of typhoon Haishen. Ratings for the 4 September broadcast wasn't released.)	0.875%
34	8 September	0.7%	0.695%
34	9 September	0.8%	0.741%
36	10 September	1.3%	1.157%
37	11 September	1.2%	1.036%
38	14 September	0.7%	0.653%
39	15 September	0.7%	0.696%
40	16 September	1.2%	1.004%
41	17 September	0.8%	0.8%
42	18 September	0.4%	0.517%
43	21 September	0.8%	0.786%
44	22 September	1.3%	1.039%
45	23 September	0.9%	0.831%
46	24 September	1.2%	1%
47	25 September	0.6%	0.609%
48	28 September	0.6%	0.729%
49	29 September	N/A (Note: The show did not air episodes from 30 September–October 2 due to Chuseok.)	0.857%
50	5 October	0.5%	0.493%
51	6 October	0.8%	0.828%
52	7 October	0.7%	0.807%
53	8 October	1.0%	0.779%
54	9 October	1.3%	1.203%
55	12 October	0.9%	0.846%
56	13 October	0.6%	0.806%
57	14 October	1.0%	0.772%

List of ratings in 2020 (episode 58–90) (Note: Yang Won-bo decided to stop showing ratings starting 15 October)

Ep. #	Broadcast date	Average audience share
Ep. #	Broadcast date	AGB Nielsen
Ep. #	Broadcast date	Nationwide
58	15 October	0.699%
59	16 October	0.868%
60	19 October	0.634%
61	20 October	0.666%
62	21 October	1.136%
63	23 October (Note: The broadcast was preempted on 22 October due to the special coverage of the parliamentary audit on the Supreme Public Prosecutors' Office.)	0.68%
64	26 October	0.57%
65	27 October	0.769%
66	28 October	0.71%
67	29 October	0.662%
68	30 October	0.578%
69	2 November	0.898%
70	3 November	0.873%
71	9 November (Note: The show was preempted on 4–6 November to give way for special coverage of the 2020 US presidential elections.)	0.944%
72	10 November	0.915%
73	11 November	0.451%
74	12 November	0.848%
75	13 November	0.985%
76	16 November	0.587%
77	17 November	0.983%
78	18 November	0.877%
79	19 November	0.949%
80	20 November	0.956%
81	23 November	1.047%
82	24 November	0.965%
83	25 November	0.606%
84	26 November	0.793%
85	27 November	1.03%
86	30 November	0.992%
87	1 December	1.128%
88	2 December	0.994%
89	3 December	0.747%
90	4 December	1.038%

- Note that the show airs on a cable channel (pay TV), which plays part in its slower uptake and relatively small audience share when compared to programs broadcast (FTA) on public networks such as KBS, SBS, MBC or EBS.
- NR rating means "not reported". The rating is low.

== Controversy ==
The broadcast got backlash from netizens due to the nature of the show.

=== Flood in Busan ===
On 24 July 2020, the show went under fire for covering the Busan flood as if a lighthearted issue. The corresponding clip was since put to private.

=== Beirut explosions ===
The Korea Communications Commission issued a warning against the show for an 5 August 2020 segment on the Beirut explosions. Viewers were aggravated with the way the show covered about the explosions, particularly with the sports broadcasting format and the "observation points". Two days later, Yang Won-bo told audience that "we always listen to [audience] feedback and heed them." The corresponding clip was then put to private.

=== Bicycle stealing ===
On 21 October 2020, anchor Yang Won-bo reported on an article about the Netherlands having a lot of bicycle thieves, of which he responded with a sarcastic nuance, saying he can protest at the Dutch embassy. On that same segment, he made a joke to commentator Park Sung-tae about it, saying "you experienced [having a bike stolen from you]."
