= Han Min-yong =

South Korean journalist and current JTBC Newsroom weekend anchor

- 한민용
- Born: 19 July 1989 (age 36); Seoul, South Korea
- Education: Peking University; City University of New York
- Occupations: News anchor, journalist
- Organization: JTBC
- Spouse: Kim Min-kwan (married October 11, 2021–present)

Han Min-yong (born 19 July 1989) is a South Korean journalist. She is currently the anchor for the weekday edition of JTBC Newsroom.

== Biography ==
Han graduated from high school in Beijing, China. She received her bachelor's degree in arts and economics in Peking University. She also finished a master's degree in finance at City University of New York.

Han started her career in 2013 as a reporter in MBN covering the police, local prosecution and law until she joined JTBC in 2017. In JTBC, she was a part of the legal team. Han became a trending topic on Naver after successfully reporting a piece about Kim Kwan-jin being in custody.

Han succeeded Lee Ji-eun as sub-anchor in the weekend edition of JTBC Newsroom, starting on 3 August 2018, just less than a year after joining the network. She then ascended to main anchor on 10 January 2020 after Kim Pil-kyu left his position to become the new political editor. This makes her only the second female to become main anchor of a JTBC newscast, the first sole female anchor of a JTBC flagship newscast, and one of only two female anchors of a news or current affairs program in the network. She also hosts the segment Open Mic, where she goes out to conduct field reports and interviews.

She was previously a member of the network's legal and political team, and is currently a member of the weekend coverage team.

Han plays the piano.

Han did a cameo as an anchor in the JTBC News-produced short film Starting Line made in light of the 2020 South Korean legislative elections.

== Career ==
=== Journalism ===
Duration	Network	Role
2013–2017	MBN	Reporter (police, local prosecution, law)
2017–present	JTBC	Reporter
2018–2022	JTBC	Anchor, JTBC Newsroom (weekend)
2023–present	JTBC	Anchor, JTBC Newsroom (weekday)

=== Film ===
Year	Title	Role	Notes
2020	Starting Line (출발,선)	Anchor	Cameo; short film produced by JTBC News for its 2020 election coverage
