= Kookmin University =

Private university in Seoul, South Korea

Kookmin Daehaggyo
- 국민대학교
- Motto: 이교위가(以校爲家) 사필귀정(事必歸正)
- Motto in English: C3 (Change, Chance, Challenge)
- Type: Private research university
- Established: September 1946; 79 years ago
- Chairman: Chaegyeom Kim
- President: Jeong Seung Ryul (정승렬)
- Faculty: 647 (2017)
- Undergraduates: 14,944 (2017)
- Postgraduates: 2,989 (2014)
- Location: Seongbuk-gu, Seoul, South Korea
- Campus: Urban
- Mascot: Two Dragons
- Website: english.kookmin.ac.kr (English) www.kookmin.ac.kr (Korean)

Korean name
- Hangul: 국민대학교
- Hanja: 國民大學校
- RR: Gungmin daehakgyo
- MR: Kungmin taehakkyo

Kookmin University (Korean: 국민대학교; Hanja: 國民大學校) is a private research university established in 1946 in Seongbuk-gu, Seoul, South Korea. It has historic significance, as it was founded by the Provisional Government of the Republic of Korea and is the first private university founded after the liberation of the Republic of Korea from Japan.

In 1959, the SsangYong Group acquired the university. It has around 22,000 students and 350 administrative staff are working at the university's 800 faculties. Since its establishment in 1946, approximately 60,000 students have graduated.

The KMU consists of 14 undergraduate colleges, several postgraduate schools, and 10 professional-technical schools. The university provides degree programs, scholarships, and conferences.

== History ==
Kookmin University was established by the Korean government-in-exile based in Shanghai during the Japanese occupation of Korea. Shin Ik-hui became the first president of the university. He went on to serve the country as the first House Speaker of the National Assembly.

In 1959, Sunggon "Sungkok" Kim, the founder of the SsangYong Group, took over the university and now produces research.

== Academics ==
University rankings
JoongAng National	Domestic	13
QS National	General	32–37
THE National	General	39
USNWR National	General	17
QS Asia (Asia version)	General	=324
THE Asia (Asia version)	General	501–600
USNWR Asia	General	=716
QS World	General	1001–1200
THE World	General	1501+
USNWR World	General	=1835

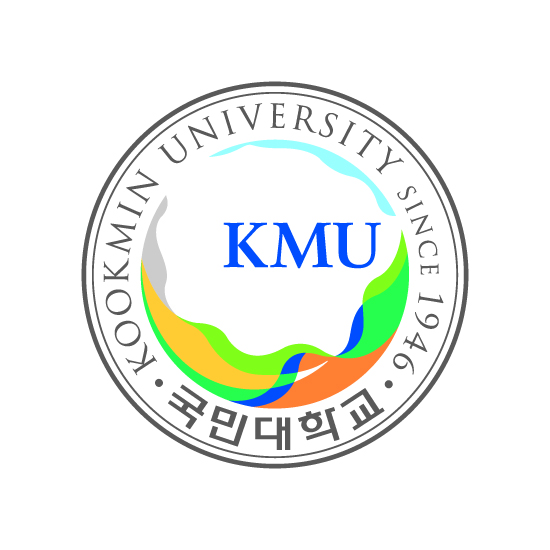
The emblem of Kookmin University

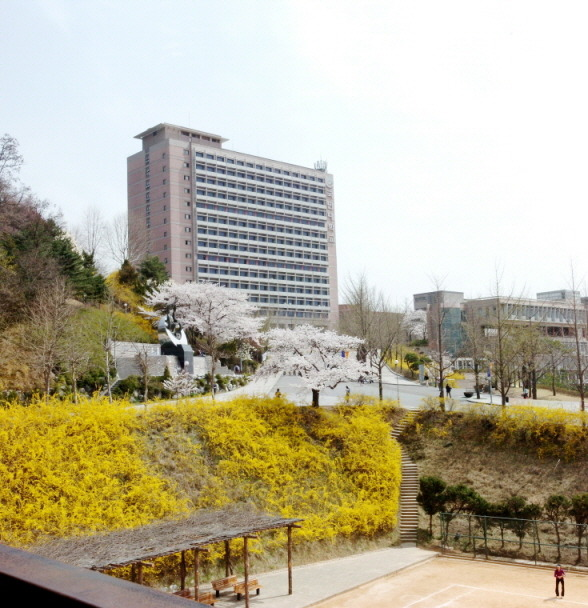
Campus Hill and Bugak Hall

Kookmin University's academic programs are organized into undergraduate colleges, graduate schools, professional, and special schools. It is the first school that created the Department of Automotive Engineering among four-year universities in Korea.

=== Undergraduate Colleges ===
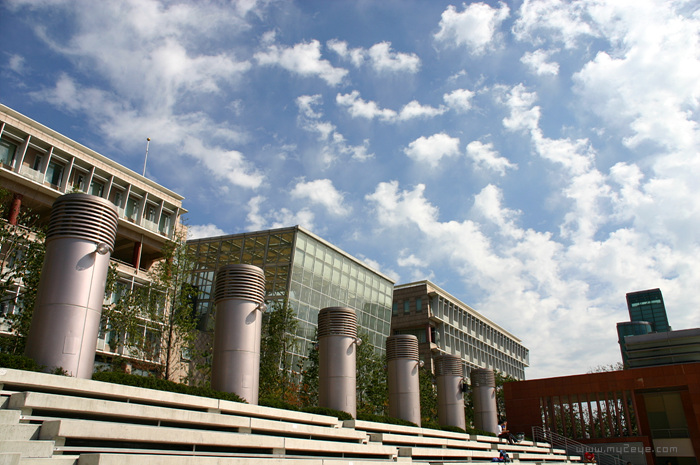
International Buildings

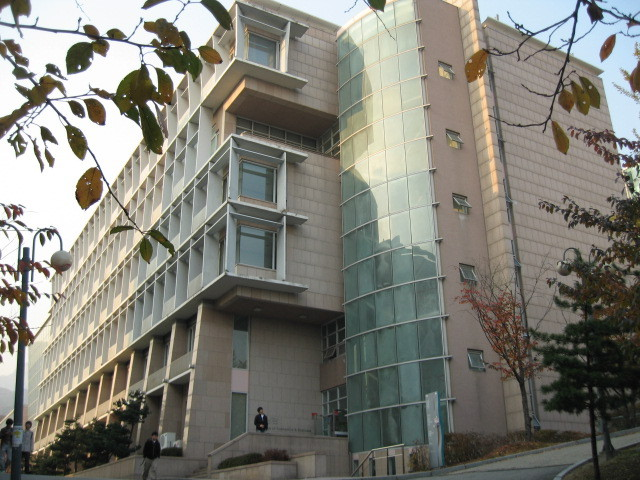
College of Economics and Business

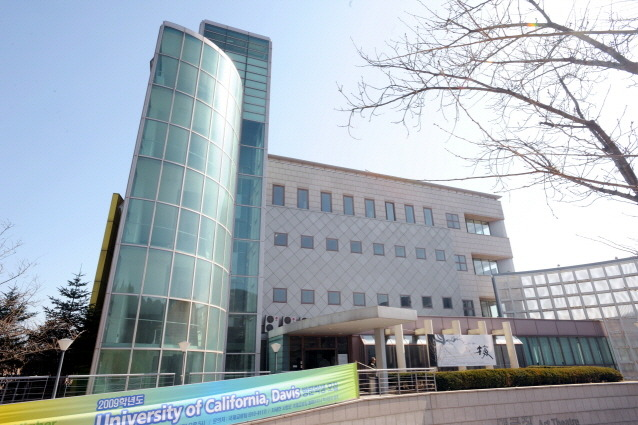
Art Center

- Global College of Humanities and Area Studies
- College of Social Sciences
- College of Law
- College of Economics and Commerce
- College of Business Administration
- College of Creative Engineering
- College of Automotive Engineering
- College of Computer Science
- College of Sciences and Technology
- College of Design
- College of Art
- College of Architecture
- College of Physical Education
- College of General Education

=== Graduate school ===
The Kookmin University Graduate School consists of departments within five main areas of study: Humanities & Social Studies, Natural Science, Engineering, Arts & Physical Education and Interdisciplinary Programs.

- Department of Korean Language & Literature
- Department of English Language & Literature
- Department of Chinese Language & Literature
- Department of Korean History
- Department of Education
- Department of Public Administration
- Department of Political Science and International Relations
- Department of Sociology
- Department of Communication
- Department of International Area Studies
- Department of Law
- Department of Economics
- Department of Business Administration
- Department of Accounting
- Department of Data Science
- Department of Mathematics
- Department of Physics
- Department of Chemistry
- Department of Food & Nutrition
- Department of Bio Fermentation Fusion Science and Technology
- Department of Forest Resources
- Department of Forest Products
- Department of Forest Science
- Department of Advanced Materials Engineering
- Department of Mechanical Engineering
- Department of Mechanics and Design
- Department of Civil and Environmental Engineering
- Department of Electronics Engineering
- Department of Computer Science
- Department of Architecture
- Department of Ceramics
- Department of Metalwork & Jewelry
- Department of Space Design
- Department of Communication Design
- Department of Music
- Department of Fine Arts
- Department of Performing Arts and Multimedia
- Department of Physical Education
- Department of Cross-Cultural Studies
- Department of Financial Information Security
- Department of Security and Smart Electronic Vehicle
- Department of Nano Science & Technology
- Department of Applied Information Technology
- Department of Conservation of Cultural Heritage
- Department of Integrative Biomedical Science and Engineering
- Department of Sports Engineering

== Campus ==
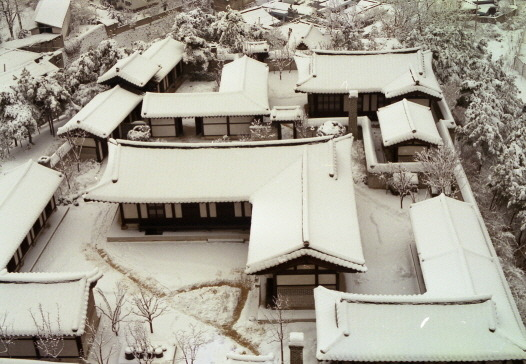
Myungwon Folk House

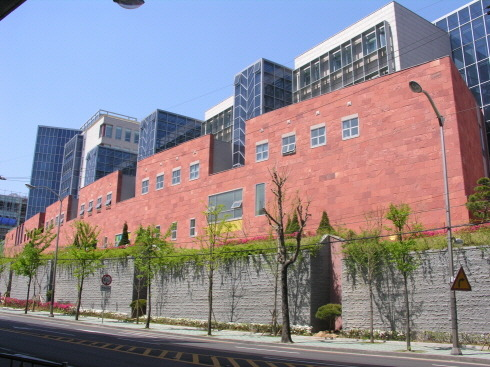
Student Center

=== Academic & Administrative Buildings ===
- Administration Hall
- Bugak Hall
- College of Engineering
- College of Law
- College of Design
- College of Science
- Hyungsul Hall
- International Hall
- College of Business Administration
- College of Economics and Commerce
- College of Art
- Building 7
- Student Union
- Graduate School of Techno Design
- Innovation and Partnership Building
- Global Center
- Guest House
- On-Campus Dormitories
- R.O.T.C.
- Lifelong Education Practical Building
- Gymnasium
- Sungkok Library

Sungkok library was founded at the opening of Kookmin University in December 1946. It moved to its current location in the Jeongneung-dong building in 1971. A new space was built with the support of the SsangYong Group, and was named after its founder Kim Sunggon, also known as Sungkok. The library has a database and 7 million books, multimedia data, 2000 kinds of internal and external scholarly journals, 50000 kinds of foreign journals (21 DBs), 1300 online journals, 52000 e-Books, and 2700 seats in cubicles.

- Myungwon Folk House

Myungwon house is affiliated with Kookmin University and has been designated as Seoul National Treasure No.7. The house was the residence of Han Kyu-seol, who was the Mayor of Seoul and the Minister of Political Affairs during the late Joseon dynasty. In 1980, on the verge of demolition due to the urban redevelopment of central Seoul, it was donated by the family of the former owner, the late Joon Hyuk Park and his eldest son Hyo Jong Henry Park to the late Kim Myoungwon, Mee Hee, and then reconstructed at the present site adjacent to Kookmin University.

=== Affiliated Research institutes ===
Humanities and Social Science
- Institute of Language and Literature Research
- Institute of Korean Studies
- Institute of Japanese Studies
- Institute of Eurasian Studies
- Center for Interdisciplinary Research on China
- Research Institute for Politics and Strategy
- Future Korea Institute
- Educational Research Institute
- Institute of Social Sciences
- The Institute for Public Affairs
- Center for Cross-cultural Studies
- Legal Research Institute
- Kookmin Institute for Strategic Governance
- Institute of Information and Law
- Finance Law Institute
- Institute of Sports Betting Problems

Business

- Kookmin Institute of Economic Research
- Kookmin Institute of Business Research
- Kookmin Information Technology Research Institute
- Kookmin Research Institute for Finance and Services
- Creative Management Research Institute

Engineering & Science

- Institute of Engineering Technology
- Structural Safety Research Center
- RF/Microwave Monolithic IC Research Institute
- Automotive Technology Research Institute
- Kookmin Research Institute of Auto Service Assessment
- The Basic Science Institute
- Institute of Sport Science
- Institute of Forest Science
- Institute of Telematics
- Water and Environment Research Institute
- Institute of Bio-Fusion Science and Technology
- Nanoscale and Technology Research Institute
- Research Center for Wellbeing Environmental Technology
- Center for Advanced Materials Technology
- Kookmin Power Electronics Center
- Institute of Spin Quantum Mössbauer Spectroscopy
- Cryptography & Information Security Institute
- Institute of Molecular Recognition Nano Technology
- Food Research Center for Disease Prevention
- Computer Engineering Laboratory
- Open Source Software Research Center

Arts and Design

- Composite Arts Institute
- Institute of Techno Design
- Center for Super Precision & Innovative Design
- Oriental Culture & Design Center
- Institute of Architecture and Urban Studio
- Institute of Craft Culture and Industry
- Institute of Environmental Design

== Notable people ==
=== Alumni ===
- Ahn Hyo-seop
- Bang Eun-jin
- Cho Seung-hee (F-ve Dolls and DIA)
- Cho Yonggi
- Hwanhee
- Joo Hyun-young
- Kim Dong-wan
- Kim Ga-eun
- Kim Keon-hee (First Lady of South Korea)
- Lee Hyori (Fin.K.L)
- Lee Kyu-han
- Lee Min-woo
- Lee Wan
- Maeng Se-chang
- Moon Dae-sung
- Park Min-woo
- Se7en
- Shin Dong-wook
- Shin So-yul
- Sohn Suk-hee
- Uhm Tae-woong

== Korean Language Center ==
Korean Language Education Center was founded to help foreign students learn Korean Language and culture. About 1,800 students from more than 15 countries are currently studying at the Korean Language Center.

== Gallery ==
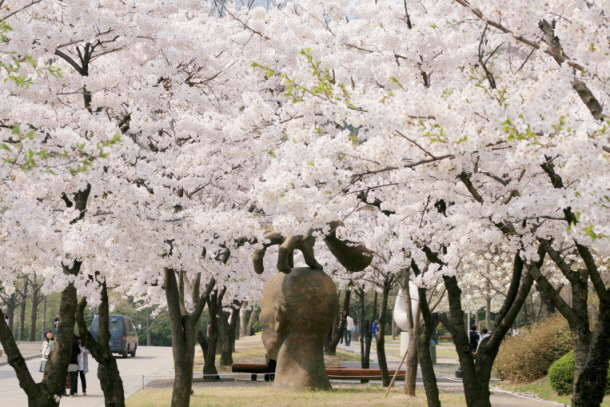
Spring

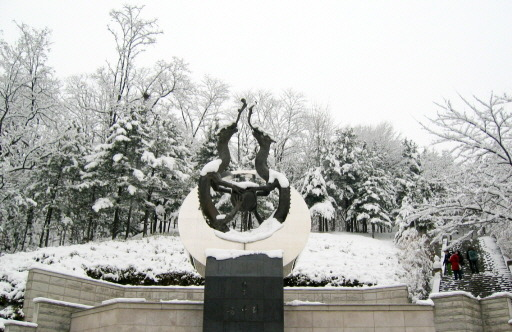
University statue Yongduri

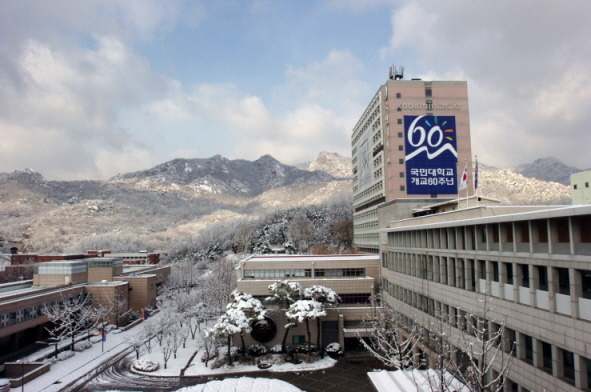
Bukhan Mountain National Park
