= Ahn Na-kyung =

South Korean announcer (born 1989)

- 안나경
- Born: 10 October 1989 (age 35); Seoul, South Korea
- Education: Sookmyung Women's University
- Occupation: News anchor
- Height: 172 cm (5 ft 8 in)

Ahn Na-kyung (Korean: 안나경; born 10 October 1989) is a South Korean anchor. She is the current co-anchor for the JTBC flagship newscast JTBC Newsroom.

== Biography ==
Ahn joined JTBC in 2014 as an announcer. During her final interview, when Sohn Suk-hee asked her what she would do if she failed the announcer exam, she replied: "I'll find ways to work here, even if it means becoming a janitress." Two months later, she became an interim anchor for JTBC News Morning& while Hwang Nam-hee was on maternity leave. She then hosted JTBC Newsroom's sports segment before becoming the new sub-anchor for its weekend edition in 2015, succeeding Lee Ji-eun. Soon after, she became the new sub-anchor for its weekday edition on April 18, 2016, succeeding Han Yoon-ji and becoming the longest-serving female anchor in the newscast's history.

Ahn has also made special appearances in JTBC variety shows Hidden Singer and Knowing Bros, as well as a guest appearance in Abnormal Summit.

== Career ==
=== News ===
Year	Title	Role	Network	Notes
2014-2015	JTBC News Morning&	Sub-anchor	JTBC	Hwang Nam-hee's maternity leave
2015-2016	JTBC Newsroom	Sub-anchor	JTBC	Weekends
2016–present	JTBC Newsroom	Sub-anchor	JTBC	Weekdays

=== Variety ===
Year	Title	Appearance	Network
2015	Hidden Singer	Special episode	JTBC
2016	Knowing Bros	Episode 10 (as a special guest)	JTBC
2016	Abnormal Summit	Episode 115 (as the Korean representative)	JTBC
