= Lee Kyu-yeon's Spotlight =

South Korean journalism program

- Genre: Investigative journalism Current affairs
- Created by: JTBC
- Developed by: JTBC Exploration and Factual Headquarters
- Presented by: Lee Kyu-yeon
- Country of origin: South Korea
- Original language: Korean
- No. of episodes: 266

Production
- Executive producer: Jang Ki-ha
- Production location: South Korea
- Running time: 80 minutes

Original release
- Network: JTBC
- Release: 31 May 2015 – present

Lee Kyu-yeon's Spotlight (Korean: 이규연의 스포트라이트) is a South Korean investigative journalism program hosted by Lee Kyu-yeon. It airs Saturdays at 19:40 KST on JTBC.

== History ==
Host Lee Kyu-yeon said in a Social Live that he has been inspired by Spotlight, the Boston Globe investigative team which uncovered the Catholic Church sexual abuse cases, which in turn inspired the 2015 Academy Award-winning film Spotlight. Lee also heads JTBC News' Exploration and Planning Bureau, which produces the program. He describes Spotlight as a program that covers various fields such as social issues, welfare, science and technology. It was going to be called just Spotlight at first, but Sohn Suk-hee, JTBC News' president at the time, suggested that he change it to Lee Kyu-yeon's Spotlight.

== Broadcast times ==
Original network	Broadcast period	Airtime
JTBC	May 31, 2015 – June 28, 2015	Sundays at 20:00-21:45
JTBC	July 5, 2015-October 18. 2015	Sundays at 23:00-24:10
JTBC	October 23, 2015 – March 25, 2016	Fridays at 21:40-23:00
JTBC	April 3, 2016 – June 18, 2017	Thursdays at 21:40-23:00
JTBC	June 22, 2017 – May 14, 2020	Thursdays at 21:30-23:00
JTBC	May 21, 2020 – November 26, 2020	Thursdays at 23:00-24:20
JTBC	December 5, 2020 – present	Saturdays at 19:40

== Awards and nominations ==
Year	Award	Category	Recipient	Result	Remarks
2019	55th Baeksang Arts Awards	Best Educational Program	Lee Kyu-yeon's Spotlight: 5.18 Secret Agent	Nominated	

== Notes ==
- Its slogan is "Shed light on the world", as seen on its opening title.
- Previous episodes can be viewed through its official website, YouTube channel or the JTBC Culture YouTube channel
