= Pyo Chang-won =

South Korean politician (born 1966)

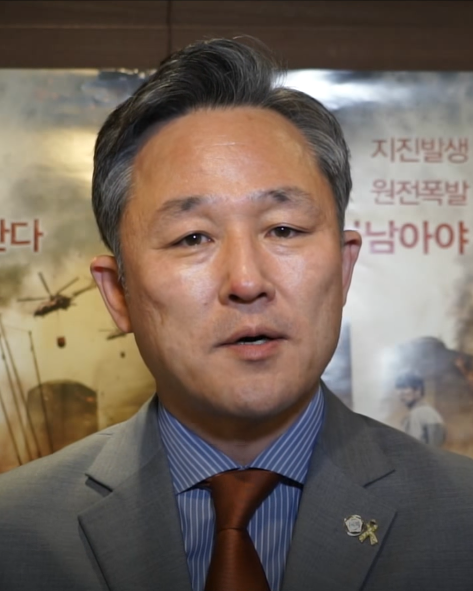

Member of the National Assembly
- In office May 30, 2016 – May 29, 2020
- Preceded by: Constituency Established
- Succeeded by: Lee Tan-hee
- Constituency: Gyeonggi Yongin D

Personal details
- Born: May 3, 1966 (age 60) Pohang, South Korea
- Party: Democratic Party of Korea
- Education: Korea National Police University University of Exeter

Korean name
- Hangul: 표창원
- Hanja: 表蒼園
- RR: Pyo Changwon
- MR: P'yo Ch'angwŏn

Pyo Chang-won (Korean: 표창원; born May 3, 1966) is a South Korean politician. He was a member of the National Assembly from 2016 to 2020.

== Early life ==
In 2013, a journalist accused Pyo of plagiarism in his doctoral dissertation, and Pyo in return threatened the journalist with legal action. Later, with a letter from his doctoral advisor, Pyo denied the allegations and claimed the alleged plagiarisms were minor mistakes in citations. In 2016, additional plagiarism was found in his doctoral dissertation, but Pyo's representatives said in response that the issue of Pyo's had already been addressed, and there is no further comment to be made.

== Political career ==
Pyo announced his candidacy for the 2016 parliamentary election, saying that he wanted "to realize justice through politics". He was elected to the National Assembly as a member of the Democratic Party.

In November and December 2016, Pyo made several comments accusing supporters of Park Geun-hye to have mindsets of group rapists, based on neutralization theory. At the same time, he released a list of politicians who opposed President Park's impeachment, now known as the Pyo Changwon List. This was criticized by his opponents as a direct act against representative democracy, an act of political terrorism, and an act against the right to vote as provided by the Constitution of South Korea.

On January 20, 2017, Pyo hosted a galleria at the parliament which included artworks satirizing Park. One such artwork, the Dirty Sleep (더러운 잠), depicted a naked Park and was criticized by women's rights organizations. Pyo was put under investigation by the Ethics Committee of the Democratic Party of Korea, and was banned from holding a post within the party for six months.

== Post-political life ==
Pyo decided not to run in the 2020 election, instead opening the Pyo Chang-won Institute of Crime Science while also hosting a radio show at MBC and current affairs program Scandal Supervisor on JTBC. He left the program in December 2020.

== Filmography ==
=== Television shows ===
| Year | Title | Network | Role | Notes | Ref. |
|---|---|---|---|---|---|
| 2021 | Earth in | SBS Plus | Host | | |
