= Maeil Broadcasting Network =

South Korean cable TV network

Coordinates: 37.560475°N 126.9928191°E

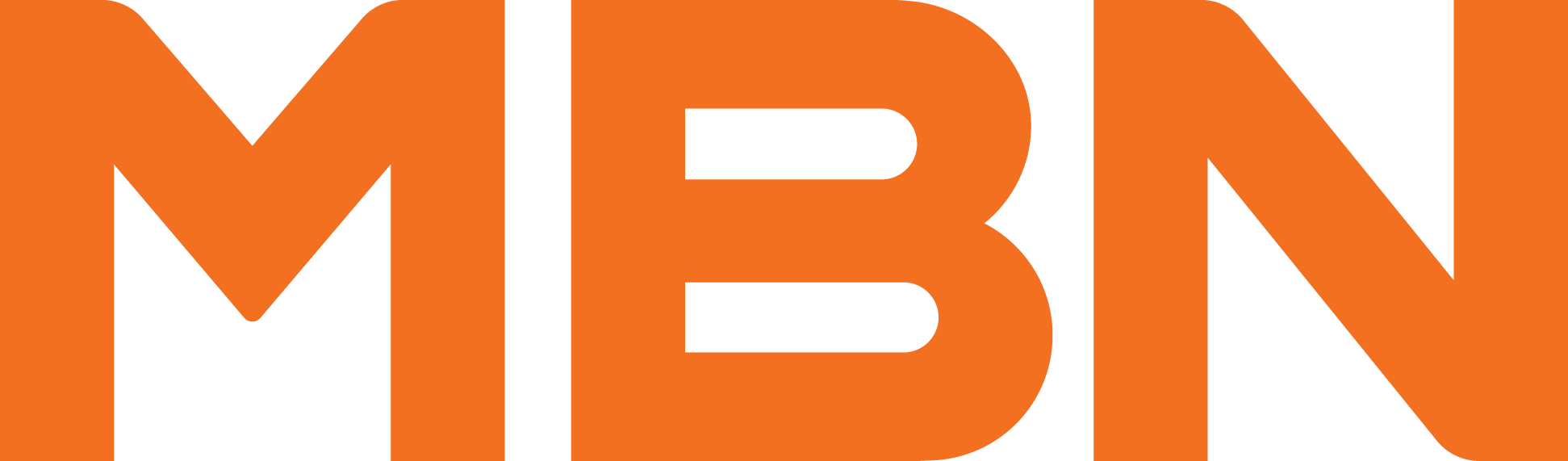
- Country: South Korea
- Broadcast area: South Korea; Worldwide (via internet)
- Headquarters: Seoul Jung-gu Toegyero 190 (1-ga, 30-1).

Programming
- Picture format: HDTV 1080i

Ownership
- Owner: Maeil Business Newspaper
- Parent: Maeil Broadcasting Network Co., Ltd.
- Key people: Chang Seung-Joon (CEO)

Links
- Website: www.mbn.co.kr

Maeil Broadcasting Network, Inc. (MBN) (주식회사 매일방송) is a South Korean cable TV network operated by the Maeil Business Newspaper. The network was first founded in 1993 initially as a cable news channel before going into its current form as a generalist network in 2011.

== History ==
On September 23, 1993, Maeil Business TV was founded. It launched the cable industry's first successful satellite transmission on December 6, 1994. On March 1, 1995, it began broadcasting 15 hours a day, and on January 1, 1996, it began broadcasting 24 hours a day.

On November 13, 2000, the network broadcast its first digital broadcast. Satellite TV channel providers were selected on June 4, 2001.

On September 27, 2001, the network signed a program supply agreement with Korea Digital Satellite Broadcasting (now KT SkyLife).

Logo from March 1, 2002 to January 3, 2005

On April 30, 2002, American news channel CNBC made a contract with Maeil Business, and the network became the MBN-CNBC channel.

On July 1, 2005, MBN-CNBC dropped CNBC and changed its name to MBN.

In July 2008, a digital news production system began operation with the opening of a new news studio. On October 5, 2009, MBN began broadcasting in high-definition. On October 12, MBN transitioned from SkyLife, a satellite broadcaster, to cable television.

In March 2011, the network was renamed Maeil Broadcasting Network.

MBN digital multimedia broadcasting radio stations were shut down in September 2011.

The station was operated as a news channel until December 1, 2011, at which point it transitioned into a generalist cable TV channel. It launched general programming, competing against JTBC, Channel A, and TV Chosun.

== See also ==
- JTBC
- Channel A
- TV Chosun
- TVN
