= Sohn Suk-hee =

South Korean journalist (born 1956)

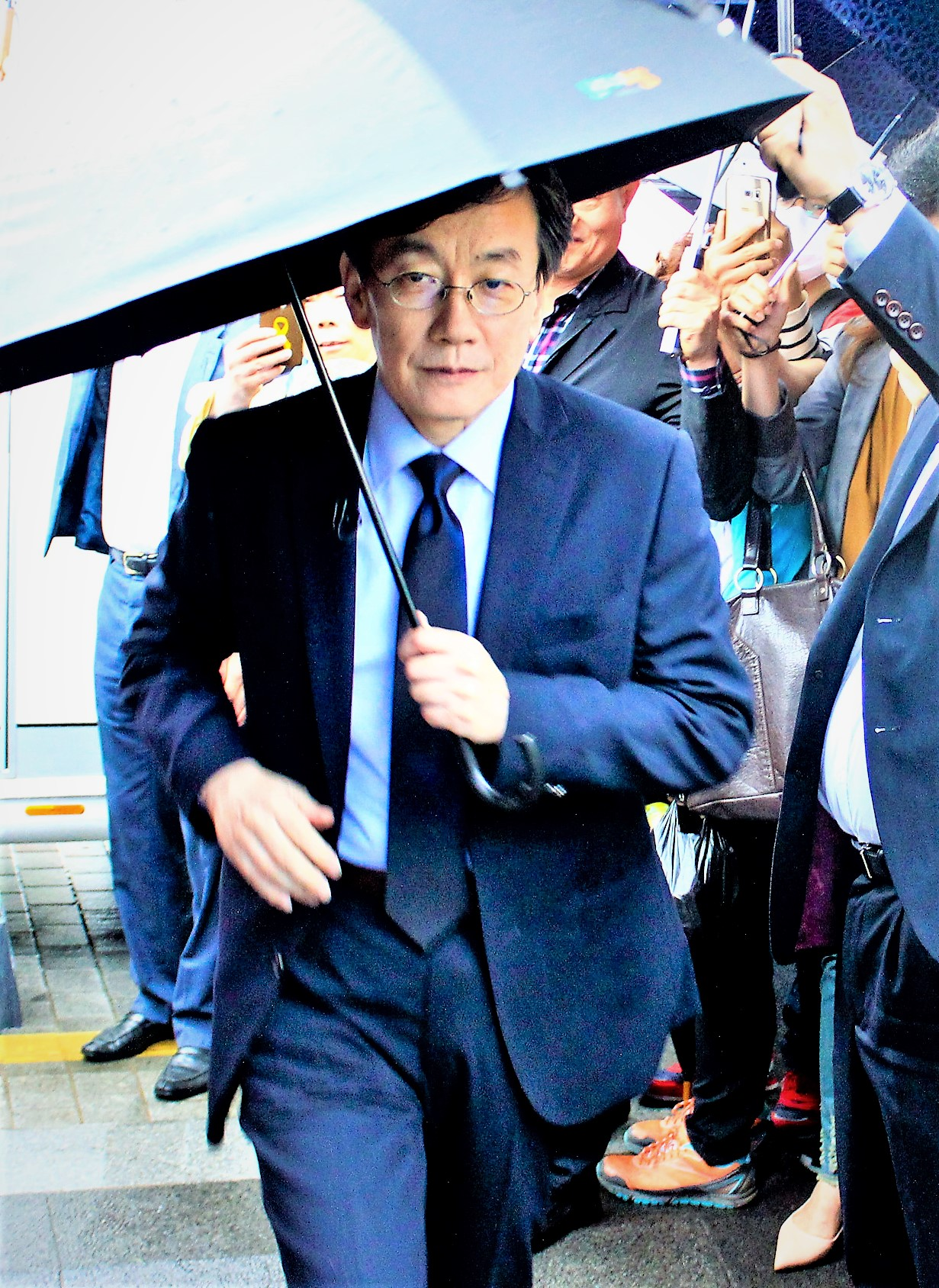
- Sohn in 2017
- Born: 27 July 1956 (age 69); Seoul, South Korea
- Education: Kookmin University; University of Minnesota
- Occupations: News anchor, professor, journalist, radio personality
- Years active: 1984–2020
- Height: 177 cm (5 ft 10 in)
- Spouse: Shin Hyun-sook (1987–present)
- Children: 2

Korean name
- Hangul: 손석희
- Hanja: 孫石熙
- RR: Son Seokhui
- MR: Son Sŏkhŭi

Sohn Suk-hee (Korean: 손석희; born 27 July 1956) is a South Korean journalist who served as the general director and president of JTBC and JTBC Studios from November 2020 to September 2021. He is also a former professor at Sungshin Women's University, Seoul, South Korea and visiting professor at Ritsumeikan University in Kyoto, Japan, since April 2024.

He is considered one of the most influential figures in South Korean media.

== Biography ==
=== Early life and education ===
When Sohn was in elementary school, he lived in Pil-dong, Jung District. He was stubborn and tough at the moment. 'This student is such a thick head' was written in his report card when he was second grader. He used to play with the orphans near the Toegye-ro, but he was so poor that he was in the similar position with them. Later, his family moved to Seongbuk District. After he graduated Sorabol middle school, he entered the Whimoon High School and became a member of the broadcasting club. There, he met Song Sueng Hwan, who planned Nanta. His experience in there played the crucial role of becoming an announcer. In 1976, he entered Kookmin University and studied Korean Literature. Students in Kookmin University called him 'school uniform', because he had only worn black clothes. In 1979, he joined the Army in Busan.

=== 1984–2013: MBC ===
Sohn Suk-hee joined MBC in 1984 as an announcer. In 1985, he became an anchor of 1minute News, Morning News and Work Site 85. He was also an MC of Teenager Special. In 1986, he was an anchor of the Midnight News and Here is MBC. He was an MC of Health at 100 years. In 1987, he became the weekend anchor of MBC Newsdesk until 1989. In 1989, he became the main anchor for the Sunday news programme, News Center and an MC of Scholarship Quiz. In 1990, he became an anchor of the Evening News.

In 1992, he joined the MBC labor union. That same year, Sohn participated in a strike after MBC did not air an episode of famed investigative journalism program PD Note, which was about a prediction about a collapse of rural economy caused by the 1992 Uruguay Round. MBC's CEO at the time, who was a known supporter of the Roh Tae-woo government, had ordered that the episode be cut since it would be disadvantageous to the ruling party at the next presidential election. Many MBC journalists decided to go on a strike to clamour for transition of MBC to an impartial broadcasting company, and Sohn was one of them. The strike lasted 52 days, and Sohn was arrested for leading the strike and was detained in Yeongdeungpo detention center with several of his colleagues during the strike. During his detention, he drew attention by speaking, "Do not change what you think is right. Keep your principle before you die."

In 1993, he returned to his post and presented Making Mornings, Choice, Saturday is Good, and An Opening Dawn. In 1994, he made his return to breakfast television by anchoring for News Wide, and its successors MBC News Today (1995), Good Morning, Korea (1997) and Morning News 2000 (1999-2000). He also hosted both Jazz Concert in the Midsummer Night and the 1994 MBC Riverside Music Festival. He was also the host of Sohn's Morning. In 1996, he was an MC of Police, Finding Suspects. In 1997, he hosted a documentary Sohn Suk-hee's Adventure to America. In 2000, he was a MC of 2000 Today. He was an MC of Wow! What a Wonderful World and Media Criticism in 2001. He also hosted the radio show Sohn Suk-hee's Focus until 2013. He also hosted 100-Minute Debate, which went on to become one of the most popular talk shows in Korea from 2002 to 2009. In 2010, he narrated the documentary Lion Queen.

On 9 May 2013, Sohn Suk-hee was named the new president of JTBC's news reporting department. And he said that officially, "I know there is opposition to my choice. But I hope people can wait for me to carry out what I have been contemplating about true journalism. I will do my best to let them understand it in the future."

=== 2013-present: JTBC ===
Hong Seok-hyun said JTBC could succeed after several attempts to recruit him. He said that he wants JTBC to be a network with talented people, and Sohn Suk-hee was a man he could find who can broadcast very fair. On 9 May 2013, a report was made that Sohn joined JTBC as president of its news department. In an interview with Sisa IN, he said "The tone would be different from the JoongAng Ilbo. As long as I have the full power of the press section, it seems to me that I will do my job". Starting on 16 September 2013, he became the solo anchor for JTBC News 9, replacing Jun Young-gi and Hwang Nam-hee, who eventually assumed the sub-anchor post on JTBC News Morning&.

On 16 April 2014, JTBC News 9 reported the sinking of MV Sewol. While he was interviewing Baek Jeom-gi, a shipbuilding engineering professor at Busan University, he was unable to speak for a while. On 18 April, two days after the incident, Sohn had a ground-breaking interview with deep sea diving expert Lee Jong-in, where he talked about an equipment called the "diving bell" that could be used for search and rescue operations even through tough water conditions. Lee said that he tried to offer the diving bell and other diving equipments to the South Korean coast guard for their search efforts, but they declined him. After the interview was aired, online community sites were flooded with criticisms from outraged netizens in response to the government's slow response towards the incident. Several days later, the South Korean coast guard allowed the use of the diving bell. Sohn Suk-hee was also praised by viewers as he was the only news anchor who covered the search and rescue efforts live from Jindo. From 24 to 29 April 2014, JTBC News 9 was conducted from Jindo, South Jeolla Province. This led to national interest and trust, and recorded audience ratings close to terrestrial broadcasters. On 22 September 2014, JTBC News 9 was reorganized into JTBC Newsroom.

In December 2019, Sohn Suk-hee announced his resignation as anchor of JTBC Newsroom following a large-scale organization reshuffle. He has held this position for six years and four months, and will only focus on CEO duties. His final day was on 2 January 2020, during the second part of its annual New Year's Day debate. That broadcast recorded a rating of 4.9%. The Times They Are a-Changin' was used as its ending theme once more as he resigned from his anchor position.

On 29 November 2020, he was named general director and president of JTBC and JTBC Studios.

From September 2021 to September 2023, he worked as a traveling correspondent of JTBC, after which he resigned.

== Personal life ==
He married fellow MBC announcer Shin Hyun-sook in 1987, and has two children with her. Their marriage was one of the few unions between MBC colleagues until Moon Ji-ae and Jeon Jong-hwan married in 2012.

== Career ==
Year	Organization	Position
April 2024	Ritsumeikan University	Visiting Professor
September 2021—September 2023	JTBC	Traveling Correspondent
November 2020—September 2021	JTBC	General Director & President, JTBC and JTBC Studios
November 2018—November 2020	JTBC	President & CEO
May 2013—November 2018	JTBC	Head, JTBC News Division
January 2011	Prosecutor's Office Policy Advisory Council	Advisor
March 2006	Sungshin Women's University College of Humanities Department of Culture Communication	Professor
2005—June 2006	MBC	Director, Announcer Bureau
2004	Yonsei University Department of Journalism	Adjunct Professor
2003	MBC	Director, Announcer Team 1, Announcer Bureau
March 2002 – 2003	MBC	Director, Announcer Team 2, Announcer Bureau
September 2000	Sungkyunkwan University Department of Journalism	Adjunct Professor
April 1999—March 2002	MBC	Director, Announcer Bureau
April 1997—April 1999	MBC	Deputy General Manager, Announcer Bureau
November 1989—October 1992	MBC	Director, Ministry of Education and Culture, MBC Trade Union
1987–1989	MBC	Reporter, Social Affairs Bureau, News Division
1984–1987	MBC	Announcer

== Broadcasting activity ==
Name	Position	Duration	Network	Notes
JTBC Newsroom	Main anchor	16 September 2013—2 January 2020	JTBC	Formerly JTBC News 9; he also served as president of its news division until he was promoted to the network's president and CEO.
Documentary Prime: King Maker	Narrator	2012	EBS	Documentary
Changsha Special Documentary: Lion Queen	Narrator	2010	MBC	Documentary
100-Minute Debate	Anchor/moderator	18 January 2002—19 November 2009	MBC	
Media Criticism	Host	28 April 2001—11 January 2002	MBC	
Wow! What A Wonderful World	Host	2000	MBC	
Sohn Suk-hee's Focus	Host	23 October 2000—10 May 2013	MBC Standard FM	
2000 Today	Host	31 December 1999—1 January 2000	MBC	One-off special to celebrate the new millennium; hosted with Shim Hye-jin
News Today	Main anchor	17 October 1994—28 February 1997; 26 April 1999—31 December 1999	MBC	As MBC News Wide in 1994, then later became Good Morning Korea in 1996; Morning News 2000 in 1999
Sohn Suk-hee's United States Exploration	Host	1997	MBC	
Live Breakfast	Host	1993	MBC	
Saturday Choice	Host	1993	MBC	
Where The Music Is	Host	1993	MBC	
Daybreak	Host	1993	MBC	
MBC Newsdesk	Weekend anchor	7 March 1987—27 May 1989	MBC	
Youth Music Camp	Host	8 March 1986—1 September 1988	MBC FM4U	
0 O'Clock News	Anchor	1986	MBC	
MBC's Here	Anchor	1986	MBC	
100-Year-Old Health	Host	1986	MBC	
Quiz Famous Painting Tour	Host	1986	MBC	
One Minute News	Anchor	1984	MBC	
Morning News	Anchor	1984	MBC	
On-site 85	Anchor	1984	MBC	
Special Youth Plan	Host	1984	MBC	

== Legacy ==
He has been picked as the most influential journalist by Sisa Magazine since 2007. JTBC Newsroom was also chosen as the most influential news program after reporting about the sinking of MV Sewol and the 2016 South Korean political scandal.
