= JoongAng Ilbo =

South Korean daily newspaper

The JoongAng

- Front page of JoongAng Ilbo (31 March 2015)
- Type: Daily Newspaper
- Format: Berliner
- Owners: Samsung (1965–1999); JoongAng Group (1999–present)
- Founder: Lee Byung-chul
- Publisher: Chang-hee Park
- Founded: September 22, 1965
- Political alignment: Conservatism (South Korean); Moderate conservatism Centre-right to right-wing
- Language: Korean
- Country: South Korea
- Website: www.joongang.co.kr

Korean name
- Hangul: 중앙일보
- Hanja: 中央日報
- Lit.: Central Daily
- RR: Jungang ilbo
- MR: Chungang ilbo

The JoongAng, formerly known as JoongAng Ilbo (Korean: 중앙일보; lit. 'Central Daily'), is a South Korean daily newspaper published in Seoul, South Korea. It is one of the three biggest newspapers in South Korea, and a newspaper of record for South Korea. The paper also publishes an English edition, Korea JoongAng Daily, in alliance with the International New York Times. It is often regarded as the holding company of JoongAng Group chaebol (a spin-off from Samsung) as it is owner of various affiliates, such as the broadcast station and drama producing company JTBC, and movie theatres chain Megabox.

== History ==
It was first published on September 22, 1965, by Lee Byung-chul, the founder of Samsung Group which once owned the Tongyang Broadcasting Company (TBC). In 1980, JoongAng Ilbo gave up TBC and TBC merged with KBS. JoongAng Ilbo is the pioneer in South Korea for the use of horizontal copy layout, topical sections, and specialist reporters with investigative reporting teams. Since April 15, 1995, JoongAng Ilbo has been laid out horizontally and also became a morning newspaper from then on. In 1999, JoongAng Ilbo was separated from Samsung. As of March 18, 2007, it has produced a Sunday edition called JoongAng Sunday.

The paper is considered a newspaper of record in Korea.

== English and international issues ==
The Korea JoongAng Daily is the English language version of the newspaper, and it is one of three English-language daily newspapers in South Korea, along with The Korea Times and The Korea Herald. It runs mainly news and feature stories by staff reporters, and some stories translated from the Korean language newspaper. The Korea JoongAng Daily is currently sold together with the International New York Times.

JoongAng Ilbo also publishes a United States edition, with branches from Toronto to Buenos Aires. Its parent company, Joongang Media Network (JMNet) holds publication rights to Korean editions of Newsweek and Forbes as well as 25% of the shares of JTBC cable TV.

== Criticism ==
JoongAng Ilbo is considered by some critics as part of Chojoongdong (CJD; 조중동), a pejorative term that refers to the three highly circulated conservative newspapers in South Korea including JoongAng Ilbo. The word is an acronym of the Chosun, Joong-ang and Dong-a Ilbo newspapers, and the grouping is seen as forming the basis of South Korea's conservative media. The term was used by Hankyoreh editor Jung Yeonju (정연주) as early as October 2000. Korean liberals criticize Chojoongdong primarily because of their conservative-biased editorial stances and doing business in a collusive and surreptitious manner. As of 2010, the market share of Chosun, Joong-ang and Dong-a Ilbo is 24.3%, 21.8%, and 18.3%, respectively.

== See also ==
- List of newspapers in South Korea
- Communications in South Korea
- Joongang Tongyang Broadcasting Company
- Sohn Suk-hee
