= JTBC =

South Korean broadcasting company

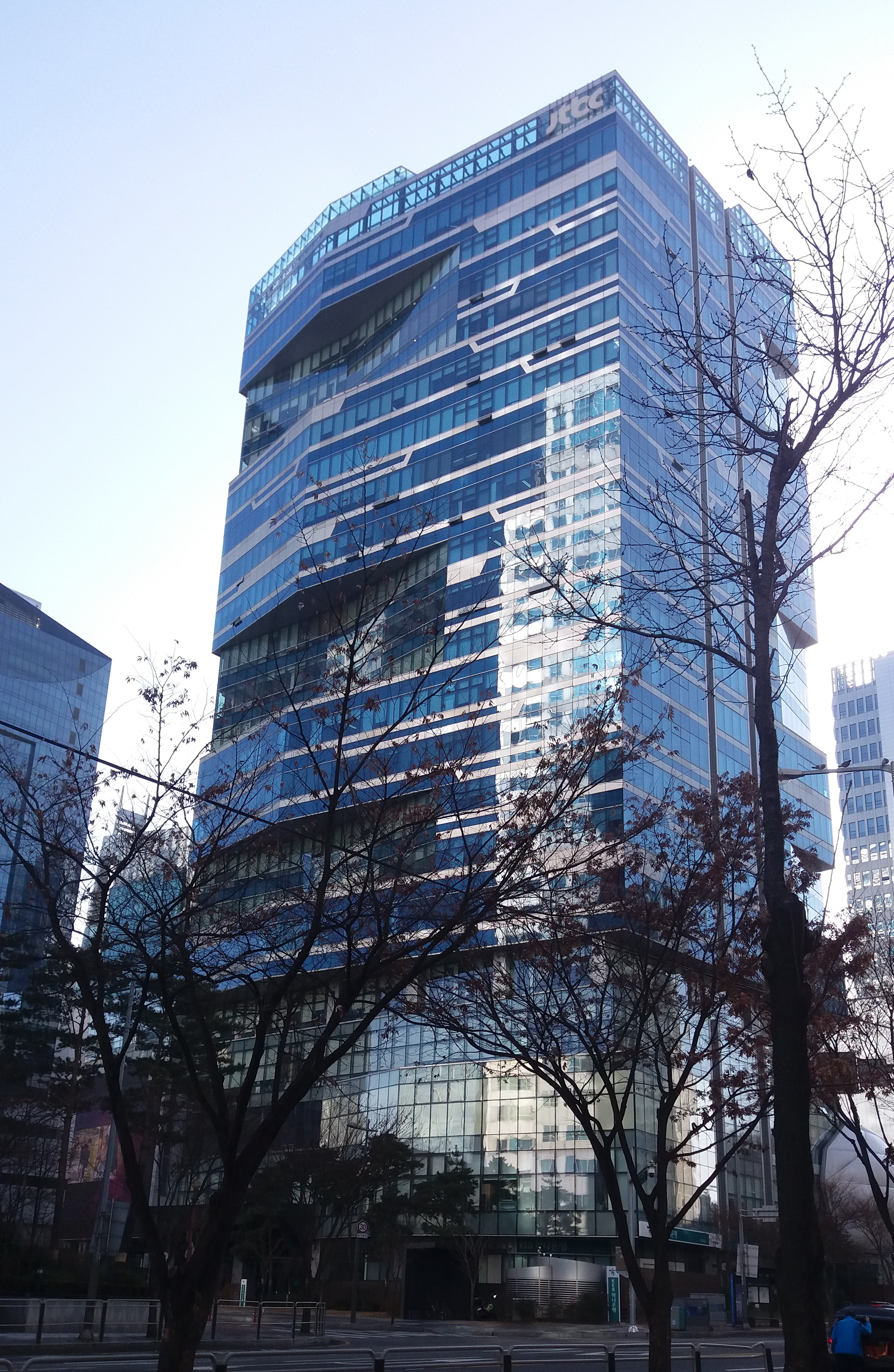
- The JTBC Trust Building located in Digital Media City
- Founded: March 21, 2011; 15 years ago
- Headquarters: 48-6, Sangamsan-ro, Mapo District, Seoul, South Korea
- Area served: South Korea
- Key people: Hong Jeong-do (Vice Chairman & CDXO); Lee Soo-young (CEO & President); Jeon Jin-bae (CEO & Head of News Division)
- Owner: JoongAng Group (25%); DY Asset (5.92%); JoongAng Ilbo (4.99%); Skydance (5.72%); S&T Dynamics (2.37%); Sungwoo Hitech (2.37%); Sungbo Cultural Foundation (1.18%); Daehan Steel (1.18%); Ace Bed Co. (1.18%); Hanssem Co. (1.18%)
- Subsidiaries: SLL; JTBC Mediacomm; JTBC Mediatech; JTBC Plus
- Website: jtbc.co.kr (in Korean)

JTBC
- Country: South Korea
- Broadcast area: South Korea, Worldwide

Programming
- Language: Korean
- Picture format: 1080i (HDTV)

Ownership
- Owner: JTBC

History
- Launched: December 1, 2011; 14 years ago (cable)

Availability

Streaming media
- JTBC On air: Watch live (only in South Korea)

Korean name
- Hangul: 중앙동양방송
- Hanja: 中央東洋放送
- RR: Jungang dongyang bangsong
- MR: Chungang tongyang pangsong

JTBC (an acronym from Joongang Tongyang Broadcasting Company; Korean: 제이티비씨; stylized in all lowercase) is a South Korean nationwide cable network whose primary shareholder is JoongAng Holdings with a 25% stake. Launched on December 1, 2011, JTBC is a generalist channel, with programming consisting of television series, variety shows, and news broadcasting. Its news division is held in similar regard to the three main terrestrial networks in South Korea.

When launched in 2011, JTBC was one of four new South Korean nationwide generalist cable TV networks, the other three being The Dong-A Ilbo's Channel A, The Chosun Ilbo's TV Chosun, and Maeil Business Newspaper's MBN. These networks serve as supplementary networks to the existing conventional free-to-air TV networks like KBS, MBC, SBS and the other smaller channels launched following deregulation in 1990.

== History ==
The origins of the network can be traced back to 1964, when the newspaper JoongAng Ilbo, then a part of Samsung, founded the Tongyang Broadcasting Corporation (TBC). JoongAng Ilbo ran the network for 16 years until it was forced by the military regime of Chun Doo-hwan to merge with the state-run KBS in 1980.

At its founding in 2011, some media analysts considered the return of JoongAng Ilbo to television via JTBC as the reincarnation of TBC. Indeed, JoongAng Ilbo had wanted to reuse the name Tongyang Broadcasting Corporation but was unable to because Taegu Broadcasting Corporation has held the rights to the acronym "TBC" in South Korea since 1994.

=== Timeline ===
- June 26, 1964: Tongyang Broadcasting Corporation launches.
- December 7, 1964: TBC-TV starts broadcasting on channel 7.
- November 30, 1980: TBC-TV merges with KBS Television under a special law of Chun Doo-hwan, president of the military authorities, resulting in the launch of KBS 2TV.
- July 22, 2009: Amendment of the media law passed by the national assembly in order to deregulate the media market in South Korea. A response from the South Korean government to the Chojoongdong (the major media conglomerates of The Chosun Ilbo, JoongAng Ilbo, and The Dong-A Ilbo), which were aiming to launch the cable market.
- December 31, 2010: JTBC, TV Chosun, MBN, and Channel A selected as "general cable television channel broadcasters".
- March 11, 2011: JoongAng Ilbo establishes the JTBC corporation.
- December 1, 2011: JTBC starts broadcasting on channel 15.
- May 2013: Former MBC news anchor Sohn Suk-hee designated as JTBC's new president of its news division.
- January 2015: JTBC constructs a new building in Digital Media City in Sangam-dong, Seoul.
- November 2018: Sohn Suk-hee promoted to JTBC's president and CEO.
- June 2019: JTBC acquired the South Korean media rights to the Olympic Games from 2026 to 2032. The company also later secured exclusive South Korean rights to FIFA tournaments from 2025 to 2030, including the 2026 and 2030 FIFA World Cups and the 2027 FIFA Women's World Cup.
- April 2020: JTBC moves its newscasts to Creation Hall, starting with JTBC Newsroom, with its other programs following suit on May 18.
- June 2021: JTBC buys a majority stake in production company Wiip from Creative Artists Agency (CAA).
- June 2026: JTBC defaulted on ₩20.6 billion of securitized loans after failing to repay principal and interest by the due date. NICE Investors Service downgraded the broadcaster's long-term credit rating from BBB to CCC, and later to D. JTBC subsequently filed for court-supervised corporate rehabilitation with the Seoul Rehabilitation Court, while stating that its broadcasting operations would continue normally.
- August 2026: JTBC decided not to seek a further extension of its Autonomous Restructuring Support (ARS) program, which was set to expire on August 30, after negotiations with creditors over a voluntary restructuring and funding plan failed to reach an agreement. The decision made it likely that the Seoul Rehabilitation Court would formally commence rehabilitation proceedings, under which the court directly oversees the company's debt adjustment and restructuring, comparing its going-concern value against its liquidation value; if the going-concern value is higher, a rehabilitation plan is pursued, while a higher liquidation value can lead to the proceedings being discontinued. JTBC had applied for the ARS program — a mechanism that allows the court to defer its decision on commencing proceedings while the debtor and its creditors negotiate a voluntary restructuring — after its June 12 default on ₩20.6 billion in securitized borrowings. The court accepted the application on June 30 and extended the deferral once, on July 29, to August 30. Meanwhile, the four other JoongAng Group affiliates that had filed for rehabilitation, including JoongAng Holdings, had already entered court-supervised proceedings, while the JoongAng Ilbo began a creditor-approved debt workout on July 10. On August 28, 2026, the Seoul Bankruptcy Court approved the commencement of rehabilitation proceedings for JTBC. Following the court's decision, JTBC began the sale process as part of its efforts to normalize its management.

== Programs ==
- News programs include JTBC Newsroom, After News 5, Newsroom Now, and Sangam-Dong Class.
- JTBC dramas hold 9 spots in the top 50, including The World of the Married. This is the highest-rated drama in cable television, surpassing JTBC's previous record with SKY Castle.
- Cultural productions include Begin Again and Ssulzun
- Variety shows include Knowing Bros, Let's Eat Dinner Together, Traveler, and more.

=== Drama ===
Currently airing TV series
| Airtime | Program | Original title | Start date |
|---|---|---|---|
| 22:40 on Saturdays and 22:30 on Sundays (KST) | The Apartment Job | 아파트 | July 11, 2026 |

=== Variety ===
Currently airing variety shows
| Airtime | Program | Original title | Start date |
|---|---|---|---|
| Monday at 20:50 (KST) | Talk Correspondent 25 O'Clock | 톡파원 25시 | February 2, 2022 |
| Tuesday at 20:50 (KST) | Love War | 연애전쟁 | June 23, 2026 |
| Thursday at 22:30 (KST) | Divorce Camp | 이혼숙려캠프 | August 15, 2024 |
| Saturday at 21:00 (KST) | Knowing Bros | 아는 형님 | December 5, 2015 |
| Sunday at 21:00 (KST) | Please Take Care of My Refrigerator | 냉장고를 부탁해 | November 17, 2014 |

== Viewership ratings ==
- The table below lists the top 10 cable dramas ranked by average national audience share ratings.

| Ranking | Drama | Episodes | Highest Nielsen Korea Nationwide Rating | Date | Airing Period |
|---|---|---|---|---|---|
| 1 | The World of the Married | 16 | 28.371% | May 16, 2020 | Fridays and Saturdays |
| 2 | Reborn Rich | 16 | 26.948% | December 25, 2022 | Fridays to Sundays |
| 3 | Sky Castle | 20 | 23.779% | February 1, 2019 | Fridays and Saturdays |
| 4 | Doctor Cha | 16 | 18.546% | June 4, 2023 | Saturdays and Sundays |
| 5 | Itaewon Class | 16 | 16.548% | March 21, 2020 | Fridays and Saturdays |
| 6 | Agency | 16 | 16.044% | February 26, 2023 | Saturdays and Sundays |
| 7 | King the Land | 16 | 13.789% | August 6, 2023 | Saturdays and Sundays |
| 8 | The Tale of Lady Ok | 16 | 13.575% | January 26, 2025 | Saturdays and Sundays |
| 9 | Reborn Rookie | 12 | 13.568% | July 5, 2026 | Saturdays and Sundays |
| 10 | Welcome to Samdal-ri | 16 | 12.399% | January 21, 2024 | Saturdays and Sundays |

- 「Ratings」data sourced from Nielsen Korea nationwide rating of cable channel, with the inclusion of occasional advertisement

== Subsidiaries ==
| Name | Description |
|---|---|
| JTBC Plus | Operates the JTBC's specialty cable channels, JTBC2, JTBC Sports, JTBC4 and JTBC Golf; Publishes Ilgan Sports since 2015 |
| JTBC Mediatech | |
| SLL (formerly JTBC Content Hub and JTBC Studios) | Provides in-house drama and film production Subsidiaries include Drama House, Zium Content, BA Entertainment, Film Monster Co. and Perfect Storm Film |
| JTBC Mediacomm | Conducts broadcast advertising sales on behalf of JTBC, JTBC Plus and Baduk TV |

== Awards ==
| Year | Award | Category | Recipient | Result | Ref. |
|---|---|---|---|---|---|
| 2019 | 23rd Asian Television Awards | Cable & Satellite Network of the Year award | JTBC | Won | |

== See also ==
- Samsung
- List of Shinhwa Broadcast episodes
- Maeil Broadcasting Network
- TV Chosun
