= Biggs (TV channel) =

Portuguese television channel (2009–2026)

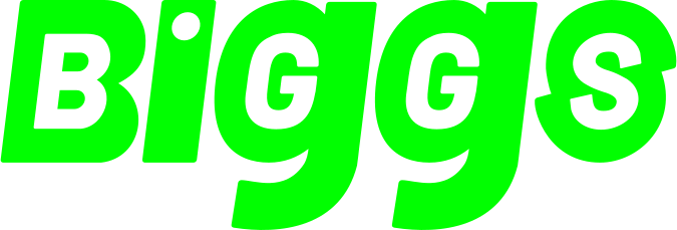
- Logo used from 2023 to 2026
- Broadcast area: Portugal; Angola; Mozambique; Cape Verde
- Headquarters: Lisbon, Portugal

Programming
- Language: Portuguese
- Picture format: 16:9 (1080i, HDTV)

Ownership
- Owner: Dreamia (NOS, AMC)
- Sister channels: Canal Panda; Canal Hollywood; Casa e Cozinha; Panda Kids

History
- Launched: 1 December 2009
- Closed: 4 May 2026
- Replaced by: VinTV
- Former names: Panda Biggs (2009–2013)

Links
- Website: biggs.pt (archived)

Biggs (known until 1 December 2013 as Panda Biggs) was a Portuguese basic pay television channel targeted to teens and young adults from ages 15 to 24.

Launched in 2009, it originally aired most of Canal Panda's programming inventory for older children, as well as new acquisitions, at a time when Canal Panda started to air mostly preschool content. The channel removed animated programming in 2021, and at that point only aired live-action television series and films. The animated programming moved to Panda Kids.

On 4 May 2026, the channel was replaced by the Portuguese version of VinTV.

== History ==
The channel was initially set to be named Bute, later Biggs, but was renamed Panda Biggs at the request of ERC. ERC approved the license on 19 November 2009.

The channel launched on 1 December 2009 on the ZON platform. It was originally targeted to children and teens from ages 8 to 14. It aired live-action shows, films, anime and animated shows. It also aired some archived series from Canal Panda that was targeted at an older demographic. It planned to air four national programs for 2010, with one of them, a magazine program, premiering in December. Initially on digital cable, the channel launched on its analog service on 1 February 2010, replacing Cartoon Network, which became a digital-only channel after that date.

Around the time of the channel's launch, rival provider MEO announced the launch of SIC K, which Dreamia executives denied that its launch was MEO's answer to ZON's launch of Panda Biggs, although SIC K targeted to the same demographic. Likewise, Dreamia aimed at launching the channel in Lusophone Africa. The channel was added to ZAP when it launched in Angola in early 2010; by April of that year, there were negotiations for the channel to enter Mozambique.

In June 2010, as part of its summer season, three animated shows premiered on the network, the anime Tsubasa: Reservoir Chronicle, Canadian series Spider Riders and American series Kamen Rider: Dragon Knight.

On 21 June 2012, the channel was added on MEO, expanding its availability on all subscription television providers.

On 1 December 2013, Panda Biggs was renamed to simply Biggs.

On 1 June 2021, Dreamia launched another Portuguese television channel targeted to children called Panda Kids. It airs most of the animated series and anime formerly aired on Biggs, including new acquisitions and films, some formerly aired on Canal Panda. Initially it was supposed to be a pop-up channel, but due to the increase of the channel's target audience ratings, Dreamia decided to launch it as a permanent channel, while Biggs was refocused as a teen channel, primarily airing live-action series and anime as its key content.

Starting on 5 July 2023, the channel only aired live-action shows and films for teens and young adults.

On 19 February 2026, Dreamia requested ERC to change the channel's content and rebrand it to VinTV, as the intended target audience for Biggs prefers to use online platforms. The channel was presented to the public on 23 April 2026 with a special event at that year's Comic Con Portugal, featuring a special appearance from Danish singer Whigfield, where she sung her 1992 single "Saturday Night".

On 4 May 2026, Biggs closed and was replaced by VinTV.

== Programming ==
=== Final programming ===
- The 100
- The Agency: Unfiltered
- The Athena
- Backstage
- El Barco
- El Internado
- Gilmore Girls
- Massa Fresca
- Morangos com Açúcar
- Nurses
- One More Chance
- One Tree Hill
- The Originals
- Theodosia
- The Vampire Diaries

=== Former programming ===
- 6teen
- Ace Ventura: Pet Detective
- Action Dad
- The Adventures of Puss in Boots
- The Adventures of Rocky and Bullwinkle
- Air Gear
- Almost Naked Animals
- Angry Birds Stella
- Angry Birds Toons
- A Penguin's Troubles
- Bakugan: Armored Alliance
- Bakugan Battle Brawlers
- Bakugan: Battle Planet
- Bakugan: Gundalian Invaders
- Bakugan: Mechtanium Surge
- Bakugan: New Vestroia
- Basketeers (season 2)
- The Batman
- Batman of the Future
- Batman: The Brave and the Bold
- Baxter
- B-Daman Crossfire
- B-Daman Fireblast
- Be the Creature
- Being Ian
- Best Ed
- Beyblade
- Beyblade Burst
- Beyblade Burst Evolution
- Beyblade Burst Rise
- Beyblade Burst Turbo
- Beyblade G-Revolution
- Beyblade: Metal Fury
- Beyblade: Metal Fusion
- Beyblade: Metal Masters
- Beyblade: Shogun Steel
- Beyblade Vforce
- BeyRaiderz Shogun
- BeyWheelz
- Blue Dragon
- Braceface
- Camp Lakebottom
- Captain Biceps
- Captain Tsubasa
- Cardcaptor Sakura
- Carl²
- Chaotic
- Chica Vampiro
- Class of the Titans
- Clay Kids
- Clone High
- Club 57
- Clue
- Code Lyoko: Evolution
- Code Lyoko
- Complete Savages
- Connor Undercover
- Corrector Yui
- Crayon Shin-chan (second Portuguese dub)
- Cubix
- Dance Academy
- Danger Mouse
- Dawn of the Croods
- The Deep
- Delilah & Julius
- Demon Slayer: Kimetsu no Yaiba (season 1)
- Digimon Frontier
- Digimon Fusion
- Digimon Tamers
- Digimon Universe: App Monsters
- Dinosaur King
- Dinotrux
- Doraemon (both the 1979 series and 2005 series and in the Castilian Spanish dub with Portuguese subtitles)
- Dork Hunters from Outer Space
- Dragons: Race to the Edge
- Dragon Ball Super
- Dream Defenders
- eBand
- Edgar & Ellen
- Egyxos
- The Epic Tales of Captain Underpants
- Even Stevens
- Family Biz
- Fangbone!
- Fantastic Four
- Fergus McPhail
- Fish'n Chips
- Football Dream: The Knight in the Area
- Formula X
- Fort Boyard: Ultimate Challenge
- Franky Snow
- The Future Is Wild
- Futz!
- Gamekeepers
- Garfield and Friends
- Gawayn (season 2)
- Get Ace
- G-Fighters
- G.I. Joe: Renegades
- Girlstuff/Boystuff
- Go! Live Your Way
- Gossip Girl
- Greenhouse Academy
- Grossology
- H_{2}O: Just Add Water (season 1)
- Hairy Scary
- Half Moon Investigations
- Hard Out
- Hero 108
- Holly Hobbie
- Home: Adventures with Tip & Oh
- Hubert & Takako
- Huntik
- Inazuma Eleven: Ares
- Inazuma Eleven
- Inazuma Eleven GO: Chrono Stone
- Inazuma Eleven GO Galaxy
- Inazuma Eleven GO
- Inuyasha
- Iron Man: Armored Adventures
- Jamie's Got Tentacles!
- Johnny Test (seasons 1–4)
- Justice League Unlimited
- Kaeloo
- Kally's Mashup
- Kamen Rider: Dragon Knight
- Kiteretsu
- KochiKame (Castilian Spanish dub with Portuguese subtitles)
- Kong: King of the Apes
- Kyle XY
- Lanfeust Quest
- Lego City
- League of Super Evil
- Lockie Leonard
- The Looney Tunes Show (season 1)
- Lost & Found Music Studios
- Maggie & Bianca: Fashion Friends
- Magical Doremi (season 3)
- Majority Rules!
- Marta & Eva
- Martin Mystery
- Max Steel
- Men in Black: The Series
- Mermaid Melody Pichi Pichi Pitch (season 2)
- Mix Master: Final Force
- The Mojicons
- The Mr. Peabody & Sherman Show
- Monster Allergy
- Monster Hunter Stories: Ride On
- Monster Rancher
- Mr. Baby
- Mummies Alive!
- Mutant Busters
- Mushiking: King of the Beetles
- My Hero Academia (seasons 1-4 and a two-part OVA)
- My Life Me
- My Spy Family
- Naturally, Sadie
- The Next Step (seasons 6, 7 and 8)
- Magi-Nation
- One Piece
- Oscar's Oasis
- Overruled!
- Pac-Man and the Ghostly Adventures
- Patito Feo
- Peanuts
- Pet Alien
- Pirate Express
- Pirate Family
- Pretty Little Liars
- Pokémon: Black & White
- Pokémon: Black & White: Adventures in Unova
- Pokémon: Black & White: Adventures in Unova and Beyond
- Pokémon: Black & White: Rival Destinies
- Pokémon: Diamond and Pearl
- Pokémon: Diamond and Pearl: Battle Dimension
- Pokémon: Diamond and Pearl: Galactic Battles
- Pokémon: Diamond and Pearl: Sinnoh League Victors
- Pokémon Journeys: The Series
- Pokémon: Sun & Moon
- Pokémon: Sun & Moon: Ultra Adventures
- Pokémon: Sun & Moon: Ultra Legends
- Pokémon XY: Kalos Quest
- Pokémon XY
- Pokémon XY & Z
- Prank Patrol
- Princess Gwenevere and the Jewel Riders
- Ratz
- Redakai: Conquer the Kairu
- Riverdale
- Sailor Moon Crystal
- Saint Seiya Omega
- Secret Agent Men
- Sgt. Frog (Castilian Spanish dub with Portuguese subtitles)
- SheZow
- Skunk Fu!
- Sky
- Slugterra
- Sonic X
- Space Goofs (season 2)
- The Spectacular Spider-Man
- Spider-Man: The New Animated Series
- Spider Riders
- Stoked
- Storm Hawks
- Screechers Wild!
- Strange Days at Blake Holsey High
- Strange Hill High
- Super Duper Sumos
- Little Tornados
- Sylvester and Tweety Mysteries (season 1)
- Taking The Next Step
- Tales from the Cryptkeeper
- Talking Tom & Friends (pilot and season 1)
- Tarzan and Jane
- Teenage Mutant Hero Turtles
- Teenage Mutant Ninja Turtles
- Teen Titans (seasons 1–4)
- Teen Wolf (seasons 1–3)
- Tenkai Knights
- That's So Weird!
- Thunderbirds Are Go!
- ThunderCats
- Time Jam: Valerian & Laureline
- Titeuf
- Total Drama Action
- Total Drama Island
- Total Drama World Tour
- Transformers: Animated
- Transformers: Prime
- Transformers: Rescue Bots
- Transformers: Robots in Disguise
- Trollhunters: Tales of Arcadia
- Tsubasa: Reservoir Chronicle
- Turbo Fast
- Undergrads
- Voltron: Legendary Defender
- Viewtiful Joe
- The Wacky World of Tex Avery
- What's New, Scooby-Doo?
- Wild Grinders (season 1)
- Winston Steinburger and Sir Dudley Ding Dong
- Wolverine and the X-Men
- World of Quest
- World of Winx
- Yo soy Franky
- Young Dracula (seasons 1–2)
- Yvon of the Yukon
- Zap Jr. High
- Zombie Hotel

== Controversies ==
On 6 and 27 November 2016, the channel censored a lesbian kiss in Sailor Moon Crystal, the removal was motivated as a "mere editorial option, although able of causing discordance". Fans criticized the censorship with protests and accused the channel of homophobia, causing it to temporarily suspend the series.

An episode of Shin-chan where Hiroshi Nohara was in the hospital caused controversy among parents and educators due to a scene involving Shinnosuke Nohara being having his buttocks examined by three nurses. The series became a target of an ERC deliberation in April 2017. The following month, ERC ruled that Biggs would only be allowed to air the series after 10:30pm.
