= Blast (African TV channel) =

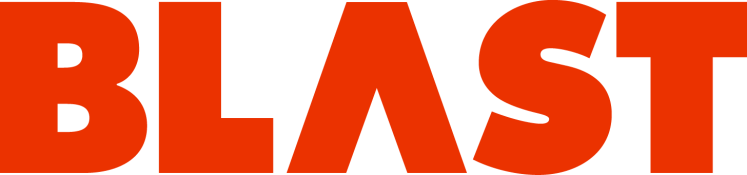
- Broadcast area: Angola; Mozambique
- Headquarters: Lisbon, Portugal

Programming
- Language: Portuguese
- Picture format: 16:9 (576i, SDTV)

Ownership
- Owner: Dreamia (NOS, AMC)
- Sister channels: Canal Panda; Canal Hollywood; Panda Kids

History
- Launched: 31 October 2014
- Former names: TV Xico (2014; satellite testing)

Links
- Website: blast.tv

Blast is a Portuguese-licensed basic cable and satellite television channel targeted to Angola and Mozambique. The channel airs dubbed movies.

== History ==
The channel started conducting test broadcasts on 26 September 2014 under the code name TV Xico on a Hispasat satellite before starting broadcasts on ZAP's satellite. Regular broadcasts started on October 31, 2014, exclusively on the ZAP platform. At launch, the channel aired for an average daily of 20 hours and 90% of its primetime programming was dubbed. For its first anniversary, the channel started broadcasting a 24-hour schedule.

On March 14, 2021, the channel started airing Vikings, marking the first time it aired a TV series.

An HD feed started on January 18, 2024.In February 2024, the channel was added to Zap's Mais package, increasing its subscriber base.
