= Panda Kids =

Portuguese television channel

- Country: Portugal
- Broadcast area: Portugal; Angola; Mozambique
- Headquarters: Lisbon, Portugal

Programming
- Language: Portuguese
- Picture format: 1080i (HDTV)

Ownership
- Owner: Dreamia
- Sister channels: VinTV; Canal Hollywood; AMC; Odisseia; AMC Break; AMC Crime; Casa e Cozinha; Canal Panda

History
- Launched: June 1, 2021

Links
- Website: www.pandakids.pt

Panda Kids is a Portuguese pay television channel that launched in 2021, and mainly features animated series and anime for children aged 6 to 12. It is operated by Dreamia, a joint venture between NOS and AMC Networks International Southern Europe.

== History ==
Panda Kids was launched in Portugal on 1 June 2021, as a pop-up channel for children aged 6 to 9, and featured animated programming formerly aired on Biggs, which was refocused on live-action programming for teens and young adults. Panda Kids also launched in Spain at the same time, as an evening block on Canal Panda, but unlike the Portugal version, it featured live-action programming including television series and reality shows for older children as well as on-air graphics similar to Biggs.

Panda Kids was initially intended as a pop-up channel running until December 2021, but due to the channel's popularity, its license was renewed to June 2022, before eventually being established as a permanent channel, which allowed Biggs to be fully refocused as a teen and young adult channel until Biggs' closure and replacement to VinTV in May 2026. Panda Kids was initially scheduled to run from 8:00am to midnight, but at launch, it instead aired from 6:00am to 1:00am. Its timerange was expanded from 6:00am to 2:30am in July 2021, then to 4:00am in August, to 4:30am in October, and became a 24-hour channel on 16 November 2021.

In 2024, the channel expanded its target audience to preteens, with some live-action shows targeting the demographic and Dragon Ball Super premiering on the channel in August.
