= Mix Master =

Television program

- Written by: Takao Koyama; Yoshimasa Takahashi; Kazuhisa Okamoto; Kenichi Yamada; Yukihito Nonaka; Hiromu Sato; Saki Hasemi; Hideki Mitsui
- Directed by: Soung-Cheol Ko; Kenichi Nishida
- Voices of: Ahn Kyung Jin; Ahn So Yeon; Jung Hyun-kyung; Cha Myung-hwa; Choi Mun-ja; Seo Hye-jeong; Kim Jeong-ho; Hong Si-ho; Moon Kwanil
- Theme music composer: Yong-Suk Bang (original version); John Majkut (English version)
- Composers: Yong-Suk Bang (original version); Mike Tavera (English version)
- Countries of origin: South Korea; Japan
- Original language: Korean
- No. of seasons: 1
- No. of episodes: 39

Production
- Executive producer: Moon-Ju Kang
- Producers: Young-Moon Min; Soon-Joo Lee; Mi-Kyung Kim
- Editors: Mun-Keun Park; Ki-Un Kim
- Running time: 23 min.
- Production companies: KBS; Sunwoo Entertainment Inc. Beijing Omni Culture Exchange Co., Ltd. Nippon Animedia

Original release
- Network: KBS
- Release: 4 October 2005 – 18 July 2006

Related
- Mix Master: Final Force

Mix Master: King of Cards (Korean: 카드왕 믹스 마스터; RR: Kadeuwang Mikseu maseuteo; Japanese: カード王 ミックスマスター) is an anime series based on the massively multiplayer online role-playing game Mix Master that was launched in 2003. The show was a co-production between Sunwoo Entertainment and KBS of Korea, Chinese company Beijing Omni Culture Exchange and Japan's Nippon Animedia. The 39-episode series ran from October 4, 2005 to July 18, 2006 in South Korea on KBS2. It also aired on Cartoon Network in many Asian areas from the Far East to the Middle East. The story centers on the fantasy and adventure card game, Mix Master. A standalone sequel series, Mix Master: Final Force, followed several years later.

== Plot ==
The series takes place in the town of Gamebridge where, through the opening of a portal from the fictional Mix Master video game world of Atreia made by the crazy Dr. Joeb and connected by the antagonist Prince Brad, the peaceful little town is invaded by the funny and sometimes dangerous game creatures, known as "hench", as well as the game world's evil Prince Brad. The main protagonist, 11-year-old Ditt Lee, is given a card shuffler by Dr. Joeb, and now must "mix" those hench (as learned from the fictional video game) to achieve peace and safety, while he grows into his destiny to become the one true "Mix Master".

The series presented over two hundred henches from different species. They can be fused or 'mixed' together to form a new, stronger hench. Henches are ranked from 1 (low) to 7 (high) depending on their power. Animals and plants are present. To be mixed, henches must be of the same rank and type (such as plant, steel, or bug). Henches are shown to be like humans, as they can sleep, eat, talk and tire out if they are overused. They bond with humans who show honesty and friendship. They have to obey the orders of the person who owns their card shuffler, even against their will. They seem to grow old and die.

Although Henches are ranked as high as 7, above level 7 one hench is known as the Ultimate Hench and is the most powerful. Ultimate Hench exists when all the 8 Henches of Rank 7 are fused with the help of the Mix Master and The Master Hench. According to legend, the Master Hench has to find one human friend whom it trusts above all else, and that human becomes the Mix Master. It appears that the Master Henches are somehow related, as Pachi's brother was the previous Master Hench. The Master Hench can be mixed to become the ultimate Hench that can defeat Giara.

== Characters ==
=== Protagonists ===
Name	Description
Ditt Lee	Ditt is the main character, a lazy 11-year-old with red hair who likes nothing more than sleeping and eating (his favorite food being donuts). However, he is a kind and courageous person with a noble and honest heart, and a good friend. When Gamebridge and Atreia are mixed for the first time, Dr. Joeb's plunger device detects that he is the most fitting person to wield the gun-like card mixer, which makes him the first real-life Mixer. He constantly bickers with Pachi, who lives in the same house with him, but they are very close friends. As time goes by, Ditt grows from a lazy boy to a true hero, and in the end, it is revealed that he is the true Mix Master, as several characters suspect from the beginning.
Pachi	Pachi is a hench from Atreia. He is cheeky, sarcastic and doesn't trust easily, and will make jokes at Ditt's expense whenever possible. However, he likes Ditt a lot and comes to think of him as his best friend. Pachi is actually the legendary Master Hench, but rejects this duty and doesn't show his true strength because his elder brother, the former Master Hench, died in the final confrontation against the Wraith of the Lost World.
Penril	Penril is Ditt's classmate and girlfriend, and the only girl in the Mixer team. She is kind and has a strong will, but is short-fused and rather over-sensitive. She is physically strong, as she trains at taekwondo at her father's dojo. She is the second to receive a heart-shaped card mixer, which works like a bow and arrow contraption. It appears that she is bossing Ditt around and mothering him, but deep down, she really cares about Ditt.
Cheek	Cheek is Ditt's classmate and friend, and an expert at the Mix Master game. Cheek is very intelligent, helpful and modest, and he is the team's best consultant in strategies for combining henches. Before Dr. Joeb's plunger device picks Ditt to be the Mix Master, he wants Cheek to wield the card mixer due to his expertise. He eventually gets a card mixer of his own, shaped like a taser.
Jin	Jin is Ditt's classmate and rival, but he doesn't befriend the rest of the Mixers until later. He is considered the lone wolf of the gang as Jin initially distrusts the henches, but later comes to trust them and the Mixer team, receiving his own gun-shaped card mixer. He constantly states his disbelief at Ditt being the true Mix Master. He is the son of Gamebridge Town's overzealous mayor, and is always quite embarrassed by his father's actions.
Poy	Poy is a young elf from Atreia, who was sent by her mother to find the true Mix Master. She always wants to help others and is very sweet. She is very knowledgeable when it comes to Mix Master lore, and believes she found the true Mix Master in Ditt, becoming his most staunch supporter.
Dr. Joeb	In his 63 years of life, the kooky Dr. Joeb came up with many bizarre inventions. He is partially responsible for the mixing of Gamebridge and Atreia, opening a portal in Gamebridge the same time Prince Brad opened a portal in Atreia. Despite all his eccentricities, he is very helpful to Ditt and his friends, providing them with mixing gear and gadgets.

=== Antagonists ===
Name	Description
Prince Brad	Prince Brad is a vain, egocentric dark elf who opened the portal to Gamebridge from Atreia in search of the Master Hench. He believes himself to be the true Mix Master, and wants to be the ruler of everything everywhere. He does not think highly of humans, especially Ditt and his friends. He is the boss of three bumbling dark elves that he often sends out to wreak havoc in Gamebridge.
Mino	Mino is one of Prince Brad's henchmen, a large, burly dark elf with a nose ring. He values power and strength, and doesn't think much of those smaller than he is. Deep down, however, he appreciates the softer, more delicate things in life. He is not terribly bright, and often misunderstands things. His card mixer is a large war hammer. He is the enemy of Penril. Being one of the three main dark elves he can turn henches to the side of darkness making them follow the dark elves bidding.
Jamine	Jamine is one of Prince Brad's henchmen, and the only female. She is obsessed with beauty, thinking she is the fairest of them all. She has a huge crush on Prince Brad, and often makes futile attempts to try to get the self-involved dark elf's attention. Her card mixer is a cosmetics compact. She is also show is a flying shell shaped vehicle with it opening for attacks. Being one of the three main dark elves he can turn henches to the side of darkness making them follow the dark elves bidding.
Chino	Chino is one of Prince Brad's henchmen, a small and skinny punkster who is rarely seen without his electric guitar. He is loud, energetic and arrogant, and truly believes he is the best of the three henchmen. He loves music and writes songs whenever he possibly can, and doesn't realize that he's terrible at it. His card mixer is his guitar. Being one of the three main dark elves he can turn henches to the side of darkness making them follow the dark elves bidding.
Giara	Giara is a self-proclaimed white witch who offers her help to Prince Brad. She seems very loyal to Prince Brad and acts in a rather sycophantic manner when he is around, and is actually much crueler than Brad is. In the end she betrays Prince Brad and reveals her true nature; she is, in essence, the Wraith of the Lost World that was sealed away by Pachi's older brother years ago, and is only interested in the destruction of Earth and Atreia.

== Episodes ==
No.	Title	Original release date
1	"Legend of the Mix Master"	4 October 2005
Ditt and his friends awake to discover Gambridge Town has mixed with the game world, Atreia. As the town's people struggle to make sense of it all, Ditt saves a creature from the game world, leaving the elf girl Poy convinced that he is the legendary Mix Master.
2	"Hench Invasion"	11 October 2005
The humans and the hench stand at the brink of all out war as each blames the other for invading their world. Before things escalate further, Ditt must discover how to use his Mix Master skills quickly in order to intervene and make peace between humans and hench.
3	"The Pie Is Delicious"	18 October 2005
Poy and his new hench friend Penguinsa go shopping at the local magic mall, but when the evil Chino transforms the penguin hench into an evil attack-hench, Poy must break through Chino's mind-control before he tears the stores apart. Meanwhile, Poy calls on Ditt to dispatch Chino using his advanced Mix Master skills.
4	"Black Belt Girl"	25 October 2005
Penril, an expert martial artist, offers lessons to a hench who is constantly bullied. But when her star student is brainwashed, Penril must fight back to restore order.
5	"Going to Work with Dad!"	1 November 2005
Ditt visits his father's office, only to find that it's been overrun by brainwashed hench! He'll have to calm the chaos to keep his dad's business intact.
6	"Cheek, Mix Master?"	8 November 2005
Cheek thinks that he himself should be mix master and not Ditt, because of his laziness and sleepiness. He tries to buy a device from a Koala hench but it turns out to be fake. Mino tries to get them but Dr. Joeb fixed it and Cheek helped out.
7	"Rivals"	15 November 2005
Jin has strange feelings, rivalry? for Ditt? Dr. Joeb shows up in Jin's house and Dr. Joeb asks if Jin wants to be a mix master but Jin kick Dr. Joeb out of his house. There was a talent show going on in Ditt's school but Chino interrupts to make people fall in dreamland. Jin saves the day and he becomes a mix master.
8	"Sports Day"	22 November 2005
It's sports day at Ditt's elementary school. But Jamine interrupts it with her hypnotized henches with a higher rank than the Mix master's hench. The gang learned that a lower rank hench can defeat a higher rank hench by working together just like they do in sports.
9	"Orb of the Black Tempest"	29 November 2005
Minions are treating henches like slaves. It seems like Mino is the leader of all this. It's up to Ditt and his friends to stop the minions and free the henches.
10	"Mister Blaster Goes Ballistic"	6 December 2005
It seems like Ditt's 5th grade teacher has changed into some Education loving Gym Teacher making them run laps. Jamine interrupts and hypnotizes henches to destroy the Mix Masters. Ditt applies what the insane teacher teaches him to counterattack.
11	"Chino's Such a Drag"	13 December 2005
Poy gets kidnapped by Prince Brad's henches, while Chino tries to dress up like Poy to steal Ditt's card shuffler. It's up to Penril, Cheek, and Jin to find the real Poy and stop Chino's scheme.
12	"Jin's Secret"	20 December 2005
It seems like Jamie has a stuffed animal fetish. It seems like Jin was treating the henches like candy. Meanwhile, Dr. Joeb and the mixers invade Jin's lake house. So does Mino, but they brag him.
13	"Mix Master Challenge"	27 December 2005
The mixers are fighting over who should be the true mix master. It seems like Jin strongly thinks Ditt shouldn't be a mix master because of his lazy and childish personality. So they all engage in a contest to see who is considered the true mix master.
14	"Sound Bites and Photo Ops"	3 January 2006
A reality TV show follows the daily lives of Ditt and Jin. In an attempt to be on TV too, Prince Brad's thugs attack the boys and the cameras capture an amazing battle, until something goes dangerously wrong, leaving Poy to become the star of the show.
15	"The Expedition!"	10 January 2006
It's a race to find the Master Hench. Prince Brad is running at full speed and so are Ditt and his friends.
16	"Star Struck!"	17 January 2006
Rumor has it that a celebrity Hench visiting Gambridge is actually the Master Hench. Ditt and his friends discover she's been brainwashed and her new movie is about to become a disaster flick unless they can save her.
17	"Shadow"	24 January 2006
When a mysterious Hench steals from Gambridge's rich and gives to the poor, the kids are convinced that this must be the Master Hench. But Prince Brad has the same idea and plots to get to the Hench before they do.
18	"Guru-Ga"	31 January 2006
Ditt's classroom is visited by a guest speaker, a mystical Hench named Guru-Ga. It turns out that the Guru's mystical powers are not as advertised, and the kids must jump into action to save him from a Dark-Elf attack.
19	"Cave Creatures!"	7 February 2006
Ditt and his friends learn of a giant dragon living under Gambridge's streets. Rumor has it that this is the Master Hench. When the kids learn he is not, they must defend the helpless dragon from Prince Brad.
20	"The Doctor Joeb Workout!"	14 February 2006
Dr. Joeb enrolls Ditt and friends in a bizarre training program to battle the Dark-Elves. Along the way, they find a collection of hidden artifacts, leading to Dr. Joeb's revelation of a long-kept secret of his own ancestry.
21	"Flower Power!"	21 February 2006
Prince Brad sends the evil Giara to defeat Ditt and his friends. Giara fills the town with flowers that turn into monsters. Ditt and his friends must counter the attack before the town is overrun with monsters.
22	"Gone Fishing"	7 March 2006
A strange creature has been sighted out at the lake. Believing this creature is the Master Hench, the kids and the Dark Elves engage in a battle to reach it first, only to discover it's just Dr. Joeb in one of his latest and strangest contraptions.
23	"Pachi's Secret"	14 March 2006
When all of the kids have the same dream on the same night, they decide to follow the clues in the dream. They discover it was a trap set by Giara, and with no one left to save them, Pachi has no choice but to reveal his secret identity.
24	"To Catch a Hench"	21 March 2006
With his true identity revealed, Pachi is no longer safe in Gambridge. Fearing that he has put Ditt's family in danger, Pachi attempts to flee but ends up kidnapped by Prince Brad and his goons.
25	"Operation "Rescue Pachi""	28 March 2006
After nabbing Pachi, Prince Brad believes he has everything he needs to finalize the mixture of Atreia and Gambridge. But he didn't count on Ditt's resilience and determination to save both worlds once and for all.
26	"Eternal Revival"	4 April 2006
In the ultimate battle, Ditt and Pachi use their powers to permanently put an end to Prince Brad and his evil plans. Although they win the first battle against the Prince, Gamebridge is now in danger and Pachi must retreat deep into Atreia.
27	"Atreia"	11 April 2006
To bring Pachi back, Ditt and friends travel into Atreia and find a world filled with monsters and magic. Unbeknownst to the kids, Prince Brad has sent his field commander, Grom, to stop them.
28	"Stage Struck"	18 April 2006
Poy's mother has been captured by Dark-Elves, but the kids soon learn it's all part of Giara's plan to lure the group into an ambush. Ditt must try something that's never been done before if he's going to save them all.
29	"The Coral Marble"	25 April 2006
Ditt and friends arrive in Poy's hometown, only to find hostile villagers reluctant to believe that Ditt is their hero. As Poy struggles to convince them, even Ditt begins to feel self-doubt.
30	"Trust Me"	2 May 2006
To gain the elves' trust, Ditt and his friends do battle with an army of Dark Elves that threatens Poy's village. After proving himself, Ditt receives key help from the good elves.
31	"Bogosity"	16 May 2006
With the help of the Elves, Ditt learns that the Master Hench has fled to a secret place called The Shrine of Ilyria. According to legend, only the Mix Master and his allies can enter this shrine which is located in the crags on a rugged mountaintop. Ditt and his friends set out in search of Ilyria.
32	"Do Cards Grow on Trees?"	23 May 2006
Ditt and his friends arrive at the shrine of Ilyria, looking for Pachi. However, four powerful Guardian Hench protect the shrine from intruders. Ditt must defeat the guardians to prove that he is worthy to enter the shrine.
33	"The Gates of Twilight"	30 May 2006
The quartet have reached the Gate and find Pachi, but Giara counted on them opening the gate, and now she challenges the kids to battle.
34	"Ancient Wisdom"	13 June 2006
Worried about their homes and families, Ditt and his friends return quickly to the human world only to find that it has changed drastically. While they were away in Atreia, Prince Brad used mind-control to turn the hench into an evil army. Now, Ditt and his group will have to fight their own Hench friends.
35	"The Sphere of Darkness"	20 June 2006
Prince Brad is preparing to harness the infinite power of the Master Hench. Ditt and his friends cross into the dark-elf world and try to intercept Prince Brad at his fortress. At the same time, Prince Brad's hench begin to mount dangerous attacks all over the human world.
36	"Making Friends with the Enemy"	27 June 2006
Ditt and his friends break into the fortress and find Prince Brad and Giara who are draining Pachi of his power so they can use it for their own evil plans. Ditt tries to stop them, but Prince Brad holds him off as Giara laughs triumphantly: she has completed the process. But what Giara reveals next surprises even Prince Brad.
37	"The Wraith of the Lost World!"	4 July 2006
The resurrected Wraith of the Lost World can bring the Human and Hench worlds to ruin with the force of his overwhelming power. In an attempt to counter this threat, Humans, Hench, and even the Dark-Elves – support Ditt and his friends as they prepare to rescue their worlds from doom.
38	"The Ultimate Hench"	11 July 2006
Battling with the Wraith of the Lost World, Ditt's allies are defeated one by one until only Ditt and Pachi remain. Strengthened by their sincere bond of friendship and empowered by the faith of the good people of the world, Ditt experiences a miracle. The ancient Mix Master of legend awakens the warrior within Ditt, and Pachi suddenly recovers his powers as Master Hench.
39	"The Final Battle"	18 July 2006
Ditt and Pachi fight a mighty battle against the Wraith of the Lost World. With a supreme effort, they seal the Wraith away, back in his prison—but his imprisonment will not be permanent until Atreia and the real world are separated again. To accomplish this, Ditt must go back to Gamebridge City and return it to its former state. His work as Mix Master is just beginning.

== Voice actors ==
Character	English	Korean
Ditt	Kathleen Barr	An Kyeong-jin
Pachi	Tabitha St. Germain	So Yeon
Giara	Tabitha St. Germain	Hyeon-ju Lee
Dr. Joeb	Don Brown	Kim Jeong-ho
Mino	Don Brown	Moon Kwan-il
Chino	Sam Vincent	Oh In-seong
Cheek	Jillian Michaels	Cha Myeong-hwa
Poy	Chantal Strand	Choi Moon-ja
Penril	Chantal Strand	Jeong Hyeon-kyeong
Jin	Cathy Weseluck	Seo Hye-jeong
Prince Brad	Scott McNeil	Hong Si-ho
Jamine	Lisa Ann Beley	Cha Myeong-hwa

== Broadcast ==
Mix Master: King of Cards debuted in South Korea on KBS2 on October 4, 2005. It ran for 39 episodes before concluding on July 18, 2006. Reruns would air on Nickelodeon, Tooniverse and other channels in the country. The first episode from the series was screened in Japanese at the Korean Cultural Center in Tokyo in 2009. To celebrate its 20th anniversary, the series received a 16:9 high-definition remaster which began airing on Cartoon Network in South Korea in February 2025. It later ran on other channels (including Laftel) before being uploaded to its own dedicated YouTube channel.

Taffy Entertainment acquired the international distribution rights to the series from Sunwoo Entertainment in October 2005. In September 2006, the company sold the series to Nickelodeon in Italy, the United Kingdom and Spain. In the United States, the series debuted alongside the launch of the Kabillion service in January 2007. In the United Kingdom, it began airing on Nicktoons in May 2007. The series premiered that same month in Singapore on Kids Central. It also aired in Australia and New Zealand on Cartoon Network. An English subtitled version of the Korean series aired on KBS World from 2010. The HD remaster of the dub was initially uploaded to its own dedicated YouTube channel from January 2025 to January 2026. Kartoon Channel began streaming it (along with Final Force) on August 22, 2025.

== Merchandise ==
Following the debut of the series in South Korea, Sunwoo Entertainment had signed deals to launch over 100 different products tied to the show. This included a line of comics published by Jaemi Books from November 1, 2005. Hanbitsoft published a physical trading card game. Samsung released educational software themed around the series.

In September 2006, it was reported that Upper Deck had acquired the rights to print an English version of the trading card game. A year later, Taffy Entertainment clarified that this was erroneous as while discussions had taken place, nothing was finalized. Taffy would use Amazon's CreateSpace service to release the series across three manufacture on demand DVD sets in North America in October 2013.

== Video games ==
The animated series is based off of the Mix Master massively multiplayer online role-playing game. Originally developed by Xai Media and published by Samsung, the game launched as an open beta in South Korea on April 15, 2003. It debuted in Japan on April 28, 2004. In 2006, Japanese games publisher SeedC acquired all rights to the title. SeedC and successive rights holders would then directly launch or partner with local companies to run versions of the game in China, France, Germany and other territories. The English server, operated by SeedC's Australian division, launched on May 18, 2007. It had shutdown by early 2011. In July 2008, SeedC produced the Mixmaster QR app for au mobile devices in Japan, offering several mini-games.

Aurora Games, the then newly established video game division of Korean toy manufacturer Aurora World, purchased the property in 2009. SeedC sold off their Japanese publishing rights to the game in 2010 to BIGLOBE, before acquiring it back in 2012. Under BIGLOBE, that version of the game was renamed to reMix Master on December 21, 2011. SeedC then sold their gaming business to Global Systems in 2015. They operated the Japanese game until its closure in April 2017. In late 2014, Aurora Games was absorbed within its parent company and the game transferred duties to Joyple. Joyple would relaunch the English, French and Japanese versions in January 2017, August 2017 and February 2019, respectively.

In conjunction with the animated series, Sunwoo Entertainment and HiCocoon developed Mix Master TCG, an online trading card game that launched in open beta in South Korea on August 25, 2005. The game ended service in late 2006. SeedC published the game in Japan, with it launching on May 24, 2006 before it shutdown on June 30, 2007.

Alongside the reveal of the second animated series in July 2009, Mix Master 2 was confirmed to be in development with it intended to launch alongside the show. In late 2013, Aurora Games announced Hench: The Mix Master, a fully 3D sequel to the original developed using Unity. The company hoped the game would run for 10 years and inspire spinoffs into other media, with two mobile games in development. The open beta launched in South Korea on February 13, 2014 but was not successful, being attributed to the publisher losing ₩1.3 billion in the first six months of the year. Service ended three months later. Joyple relaunched the game as Monster World through a one-month public beta on February 12, 2015. Joyple and OGN Studio retooled the game again under the name Mix Master 2. Global Systems launched this version in Japan on September 24, 2015, before service ended on August 31, 2016. Joyple operated it in South Korea between August 2016 and August 31, 2017.

== See also ==
- aeni
