= Mix Master: Final Force =

South Korea–Singapore animated series

- Written by: Kyung-Hee Chang; Hyung-Joo Kim; Chung-Bok Lee; Hee-Yeon Kim; Oh-Hyun Kwon; Jee-Hyun Song
- Directed by: Oh-Hyun Kwon
- Voices of: Dorothy Fahn; Doug Erholtz; Michelle Ruff; Stephanie Sheh; Heather Downey; Philece Sampler; Jessica Straus
- Composer: Jea-Kwang Yoo
- Countries of origin: South Korea; Singapore
- Original language: Korean
- No. of episodes: 39

Production
- Executive producers: Han-Young Kang; Moon-Ju Kang
- Producer: Mi-Kyung Kim
- Editor: Jae-Woo Seo
- Running time: 23 min.
- Production companies: KBS; Sunwoo Entertainment Inc. Sunwoo APAC; Stonebridge; Sovik

Original release
- Network: KBS2; Toonami (Asia)
- Release: May 26, 2010 – March 16, 2011

Related
- Mix Master: King of Cards

Mix Master: Final Force (Korean: 최강 합체 믹스마스터; RR: Choegang hapche Mikseumaseuteo) is a co-produced animated series based on the Mix Master franchise. Produced by Sunwoo Entertainment in Korea and their Singaporean Asia Pacific branch, the series aired for 39 episodes on KBS2 between May 26, 2010 and March 16, 2011.

== Story ==
In this story, Ditt forgets that he was a Mix Master. But when the time comes to save the world once again, he finds new friends to help him in his battle against Eva and Babel, the two new antagonists. After the battle, Ditt and his friends meet the true antagonist of the season, Red Knight. They find out that Red Knight was once a hero named Kendrick who had a Master Hench named Kayon and couldn't resist the taste of power and decided to enslave henches to get more power. He ended up being enslaved by his own core force. When Ditt and his comrades finally defeated him they thought it was over but they had to deal with another big threat: Red Knight had a friend called Blue Fox, also mad due to his mad quest for power. He is trying to obtain the Dark Mix Masters, such as Youring, Tomo, Juho, Yuna, and Luna. They also have to battle an evil R1 energy being named Root, who is Moreen's brother.

== Characters ==
=== Main characters ===
- Ditt – He's only interested in playing games and always very good at being lazy. He's also very emotional and always speaks before he thinks. But over time, he starts becoming a boy who learns how to be faithful and learns to value friendship above all. Sometimes his optimism and easygoing personality help the team. Normally he doesn't seem like a nice boy because of his actions and words. But in a battle situation, he always plays an important role in leading the team to victory thanks to his decisive advice that raises the morale of the team.
- Ray – A good student who always works hard and really has it together. He always thinks things over rationally before he jumps into a problem. He's very popular at school, but he's not interested in being popular. He seems aloof at times because he doesn't express his feelings very often. But that's partly because he has a repressed sense of inferiority and guilt over his dead brother inside him. He plays the role of the strategist of the team in battle situations.
- Aring – She is a female hero with a warm heart. She's a cheerful, outgoing girl. She tries to lead the team when anything happens. She always bickers with Ditt about his lazy habits. She always looks perfect whatever she does, but deep in her heart, she feels lonely. She boosts the team's striking power with aggressive attacks in battle situations.
- Moreen – She's often expressionless and doesn't speak much. She was treated as an outcast as a child, but she grew up to be a strong girl. She may be introverted, but she has strong willpower. She has the power to cure others and is very good at defending.

== Cast ==
- Dorothy Fahn : Ditt
- Doug Erholtz : Ray
- Michelle Ruff : Aring
- Stephanie Sheh : Moreen
- Heather Downey : Chichi
- Philece Sampler : Mir
- Jessica Straus : ANGANG / Eva / Root
- Donn A. Nordean: Ninom / Blue Fox
- Patrick Seitz: Babel / Wolfman
- Edgar Recinos: Red Knight
- Sal Romeo : Grand Pung
- Marlo P. Flanagan: Pazzi
- Steve Kramer : Kayon

=== Additional Cast ===
- Akhil Conner
- Alison MacCarley
- Andrea Veneziao
- Anna Garduño
- Barbara Brown
- Barbara Goodson
- Bobby Thong
- Cindy Robinson
- Cristina Vee
- Danielle Judovitz
- Dave Mallow
- David Lodge
- David Veneziano
- Donald Miles
- Doug Stone
- Erik Scott Kimerer
- Gus DeBair
- Hillary Balk
- Jacob Craner
- Melissa Fahn
- Micah St. Hilaire
- Michael Bybee
- Michael Dale Brown
- Michael Sinterniklaas
- Michael Sorich
- Mike Davis
- Mille Oliver
- Mitchel Young Evans
- Mona Marshall
- Murray Blue
- Nicholas Apostolina
- Peter Anderson
- Peter Lurie
- Randall Montgomory
- Richard Smallberrie
- Robert Duncan
- Robert Mark
- Sam Regal
- Mark Allen Jr.
- William Steinberg
- Marc Handler
- Marlene Sharp
- Will Churchill
- Laura Gerow
- Tony Salvatore
- Tony Oliver
- Kyle Hebert
- Kirk Thornton
- Tomoko Shimomura
- Tara Platt
- Julia Abelew
- Jacquelyn Raffle
- Stephanie Misa
- Jr.Jillian Blaine
- James Mastroianni
- KleinSpike Spencer
- Sarah Williams

== Crew ==
- Produced by: Sunwoo Entertainment Co., Ltd., Sunwoo Asia Pacific Pte. Ltd.
- Executive Producers: Han-Young Kang, Moon-Ju Kang
- Producer: Mi-Kyung Kim
- Directed by: Oh-Hyun Kwon
- Written by: Kyung-Hee Chang, Hyung-Joo Kim, Chung-Bok Lee, Hee-Yeon Kim, Oh-Hyun Kwon, Jee-Hyun Song
- Line Producers: Jong-Yoon Yoon, Gab-Hee Han
- English Language Producer / Voice Director: Marc Handler
- Executive Story Editor / English Language Script Writer: Marc Handler
- Script Coordinator / Casting Director: Deborah Crane
- Audio Post Production Services-English Language: Soundworks, Burbank, CA (Jeff Sheridan, Dabid Veneziano)
- Recording Supervisor: Jeff Sheridan
- Recording Engineer: Dan Montes, Jacob Craner, Patrick Bell
- English Opening & Closing Theme Songs Produced by: John Majkut & Marc Handler
- English Lyrics by: Marc Handler
- Opening Theme Song English Vocalist: John Majkut
- Closing Theme Song English Vocalist: Cindy Robinson
- Art Director: Young-Woon Lee
- Character Design: Jong-Ho Lee, Jin-Hyun Jeon, Hyun-soo We, Eun-Jung Lee
- Background Design: Min-Hee Son, Myung-Shin Goo, Hyung-Joon Cha, Jin-Cheol Gil, Kyung-Ja Kim
- Mechanic Design: Cheol Sung, Cheoul-woo Jung, Dong-Ho Sung
- Prop Design: Won-Hee Choi, Hae-Sun Jung
- Color Design: Min-A Lee
- Character Supervisors: Jong-Gi Choi, Eun-Joo Cho
- Storyboards by: Baek-Yeop Sung, Chung-Bok Lee, Jong-Kyung Lee, Seung-Jin Bang, Heon-Pyo Hong, Sung-Cheol Go, Gi-du Kim, Hong-Soo Joo, Seung-Hyun Jo, Seung-Hyun Go, Sung-Dae Kim
- Layout Supervisors: Hyun-Geun Chang, Seok-Hee Seo, Jong-Yong Kim, Jong-Kyung Lee, Moon-Yeong Lim, Sang-Won Woo, Seong-Beom Kim, Hyung-Geun Chang, Bong-Hyun Yu, Gi-Nam Kim, Young-Hoon Han, Gi-Doo Lee, Si-Yun Park
- Key-Animation Supervisors: Jong-Jun Park, Eun-Joo Cho, Sang-Hoon Cha, Dong-Gyun Ryu, Mi-Yung Cheong, Dong-Ik Lee, Seong-Beom Kim, Eun-Soo Oh, Min-Bae Lee, Yong-Joo Kim, Jung-Ha Seo, Soo-Il Yun, Jeon-Jong Lee, Gang-Yun Kim, Hyun-Jo Ha, Hyo-Kyung Lim, Jin-Uk Lim, Sang-Li Kim
- Animation Supervisors: Kyung-Sook Cheon, Sung-Kwon Kang, Sung-Jin Lee
- Background Supervisors: Yun-Ho Lee, Seung-Chan Kang, Sang-Woon Kim
- Layout & Key Animation: Dae-Ryong Kang, Joon-Kyung Chang, Yong-Joo Kim, Eun-Soo Oh, Jin-Gwang Kim, Chang-Seop Shin, Deok-joo Ha, Deok-Ho Lee, Ji-Hee Jung, Yung-Hee Choi, Jae-Wook Lee, Ki-Cheol Na
- Animation: Bo-mi Kim, Yu-Young Kim, Deok-Jin Yang, Ga-Ram Won, Mi-Sun Lee, Hyun-ok Lee, Eun-Hee Jung, Young-Shin Cho, Sung-Woo Choi, Jung-Soon Choi, Jung-Ok Choi, Ji-Yeon Choi, Shin-Ae Ham
- Color Key: Mi-Hyun Ahn, Mi-Ae Na, Sun-A Yang, Soon-Nam Kim, Nam-Hee Kim
- Final Check: Young-Ran Cho, Young-Ra Cho, Ha-Yeon Lee, Moon-Yeong Lim
- Ink & Paint: Eun-Hee Kim, Soo-Jung Kim, Jin-Kyung Kim, Tae-Hee Kim, Hee-Jung Kim, Moon-Hee Na, Jung-Hwa Min, In-Sook Shim, Sun-Hee Yang, In-Sook Yang, So-Young Yeo, Moon-Seop Lee, Jung-Hye Lee, Sook-Ja Yeon, Yun-Hee Jung, Sun-Ok Cho, Jin-Young Han, Mi-Ae Heo, Soo-Jin Hwang, Ji-Young Hwang, Hye-Jin Cho, Shin-Hye Yun, Kyung-Mi Kim, Hye-Sook Hwang, Min-Seol Kim
- Backgrounds: Young-Bae Lee, Ji-Seong Lee, Hwa-Jin Cho, Sang-Gyu Bae, Sang Hyeop Nam, Go-Eun Lee, Hye-Mi Yun, Shin-Ha Park, A-Ra Kang, Jericho Ebardo Benavente, Aristotie Bagay Landayan, Carlo Lirazan Pujeda, Dexter Jimena Abdamin, Henry Felicano Du, Oliver Barruela Orap-orap, Emmanuel Angeles Villaverde
- 3D Supervisor: Suk-Bum Lee, Dae-Il Kang
- 3D Animation: Jung-Whun Bang, Byung-Kwon Jung, Seong-Gyu Cho, Jung-Seop Lee, Jong-Min Lim, Won-Kyung Song, Jong-Hyeok Eom
- Modeling: Young-Man Kim, Pil-Young Lee, Jeoung-Do Seo
- Rigging: Jung-Whun Bang, Pil-Young Lee, Young-Man Kim
- Lighting: Young-Man Kim
- Texture: Young-Man Kim, Seok-Gi Kim
- Camera Supervisor: Oh-Joon Kwon
- Camera: Hyun-Heum Park, Hee-Jin Kang, Bok-Hyun Jung, Chang-Min Oh, Kyung-Soo Choi, Ji-Hoon Hyun, Eun-Sil Lee, Gwang-Hee Lee, Young-yun Go, Mi-Kyung Lee, Woo-Sung Hwang, Jong-Sun Ha
- Music Composed by: Jea-Kwang Yoo
- Post Production Sound Effect Services: Soo-Yeon Cho, Seung-Hee Go
- Chief Production Coordinators: Seong-Jin Seo, Moon-Young Lim
- Coordinators: Eun-Yung Nam, Joon-Sun Lee, Jee-Hyun Song, In-Hyung Cho, Eun-Hye Ahn
- English Coordinator: Oh-Sung Kwon
- Marketing: Jun-so Jeon, Soo-Hee Seong
- Overseas Marketing: Jun-Bok Lee, Yeong-Taek Son, Sook-Hui Choi
- Marketing Design: Tae-Seong Park, Hae-Jung Chang
- Mechanic Design Support: Byung-Yun Choi, Won-Kyun Cho
- System Administrator: Jung-Myung Park
- Editor: Jae-Woo Seo
- Business Management Support: Shin-Hwan Lee, Sung-Il Yun, Hyo-Sang Nam, Saemina Choi, Ji-Hye Shin
- Materials Management: Yang-Eun Lee
- Trade Insurance Supported by: Korea Trade Insurance Corporation
- Overseas Distribution Supported by: Korea Creative Content Agency
- Invested by: Sunwoo Entertainment Co., Ltd., Sunwoo Asia Pacific Pte. Ltd., Stonebridge Capital Inc., Sovik Venture Capital Co., Ltd.
- © Sunwoo / Sunwoo APAC / Stonebridge / Sovik

== Episodes ==
No.	Title	Original release date
1	"The Mix Master is Back!"	26 May 2010
2	"The Pledge of Honor"	9 June 2010
3	"Big Turtle, Big Trouble"	16 June 2010
4	"Happy Birthday, Ray!"	23 June 2010
5	"Don't Mess with Moreen"	30 June 2010
6	"Pazzi Returns?!"	7 July 2010
7	"Danger Danger, Dayuk Dayuk"	14 July 2010
8	"Monkeyroos"	21 July 2010
9	"Bug World"	28 July 2010
10	"The Cave of Mana"	4 August 2010
11	"The Maze"	11 August 2010
12	"The Boiler Room"	18 August 2010
13	"Red Knight's Master Hench"	25 August 2010
14	"The End of Red Knight"	1 September 2010
15	"Curtain Up! Snow White!"	8 September 2010
16	"Here Comes the Dark Mix Master!"	15 September 2010
17	"The Baku"	29 September 2010
18	"Chocolate Day"	6 October 2010
19	"Shape Shifter"	13 October 2010
20	"The Girl with No Face"	20 October 2010
21	"Scarrrry!"	27 October 2010
22	"Genius"	3 November 2010
23	"Secret Agent Wolfman!"	10 November 2010
24	"Twins' Spins"	17 November 2010
25	"Fox Trap"	1 December 2010
26	"The New Dark Mix Master ... Ray!"	8 December 2010
27	"Blue Fox Strikes Back"	15 December 2010
28	"When Penguins Go Bad"	22 December 2010
29	"The World is Starting to Mix"	29 December 2010
30	"Mix Battle Grand Slam"	5 January 2011
31	"A Witch's Daughter"	12 January 2011
32	"The Silver Witch"	19 January 2011
33	"Finding Roots!"	26 January 2011
34	"The Fairy Tale Forest"	9 February 2011
35	"Destiny"	16 February 2011
36	"Skeletons!"	23 February 2011
37	"Courage"	2 March 2011
38	"Final Guardian"	9 March 2011
39	"Let's Mix it Up!"	16 March 2011

== Production ==
Sunwoo Entertainment had planned to produce a sequel to King of Cards shortly after the show's conclusion. International demand spurred the development of a follow-up, which was designed to be accessible to audiences who hadn't seen the first series. It was pitched to broadcasters at MIPTV in April 2009. In July 2009, Cartoon Network APAC announced that it had acquired Mix Master Season 2, a 40-episode standalone sequel, for broadcast in over 24 different countries in 2010. The Korea Export-Credit Insurance Corporation invested ₩800 million into the show, becoming the first animated series to receive their support.

== Broadcast ==
The series premiered on KBS2 in South Korea on May 26, 2010. It ran for 39 episodes, before concluding on March 16, 2011. It would later air on Cartoon Network, JEI Talent TV, Daekyo Kids TV, Tooniverse and other channels across the country. Across Southeast Asia, the series ran on Cartoon Network and Toonami from June 2011. Final Force's English version was recorded at Soundworks in Burbank, California.

Sunwoo Entertainment sold Mix Master: Final Force to a variety of international representatives. By early 2011, Kidz Entertainment had agreed to represent the series in Eastern Europe, with a Chinese distributor also on board. Imira Entertainment acquired the Iberian rights in November 2010 and sold the show to Canal Panda in Portugal. Studio Licensing was appointed as the North America rights holder in October 2011, with the intent to launch the series across Europe and North America in 2012. At an undisclosed point, the North American rights were picked up by Splash Entertainment, who had distributed the first season, made it available on their Kabillion service in March 2017. Kartoon Channel began streaming it (along with the original series) on August 22, 2025.

== Merchandise ==
Sunwoo Entertainment envisioned Final Force as a one source, multi-use property meant to span across mediums. The company introduced a toyline in South Korea in July 2010 that had generated ₩5 billion in sales by February 2011. The company also published the first ten episodes on DVD across two volumes released on September 15, 2010. Haksan Publishing released puzzles, coloring books and a comic based on the series.

In collaboration with Sunwoo, NeoSun released 3D Mix Master TCG a physical trading card game with an augmented reality application for personal computers. The first set was released in May 2011, with the second following in August.
