= The Mojicons =

Russian children's animated TV series

- Genre: Adventure
- Created by: Ivan Mantsurov Alexander Romanets
- Written by: Alexander Romanets; Vyacheslav Marchenko
- Directed by: Alexander Romanets; Vyacheslav Marchenko
- Composers: Kevin MacLeod; Alexander Romanets
- Country of origin: Russia
- No. of seasons: 2
- No. of episodes: 26 (and 1 special)

Production
- Producers: Alexander Revva; Mikhail Luchkevich
- Running time: 12 minutes
- Production company: Kolobanga

Original release
- Network: STS; Carousel
- Release: October 19, 2015 – October 13, 2016

The Mojicons (Russian: Колобанга) is a Russian animated series, created by the animation studio Kolobanga.

The animated series follows the adventures of smileys on the internet, traveling through websites: from a social network to a Wiki-Wiki library and Fidoneta. The characters are based on Ivan Mantsurov's kolobok emoticons, known from ICQ and internet forums.

The Mojicons consists of 26 12-minute episodes. The first season premiered on October 19, 2015, on the STS. Later, the series began airing on the TV channels Carousel. The second season premiered on September 30, 2016, on the animated series official YouTube channel.

In the fall of 2016, the cartoon was adapted for showing abroad under the title The Mojicons. The series is airing Nickelodeon in Greece.

In 2017, it was also broadcast on Toon Goggles and Amazon Prime Video in the USA.

In 2017, two full-length animated film versions were created based on the first season of The Mojicons one for Russian and one for international release. In Russia, the cartoon is titled The Mojicons. Hello, Internet! (Russian: Колобанга Привет, Интернет!) In late 2023, the studio announced a new project titled The Mojicons. Forward to the Past! (Russian: Колобанга Вперед в прошлое!) , which, according to the creators, is scheduled for release in 2025. A special episode was also released on the official The Mojicons channel on January 1, 2024.

== Plot ==
The Mojicons is a town where smileys live and work: they help teenager Anton convey emotions through messages. But their carefree life is disrupted by plans to kidnap Athos, the mail dog. The internet is in danger: millions of websites could be wiped out. The friends — Chelka (Fringe in english), Brainpot, Moji, and Glitch the enemy and unravel a web of mysterious events, otherwise the internet and The Mojicons face imminent destruction.

== Characters ==
The cartoon's characters are mostly Moji-shaped smiley faces. The following minor characters are exceptions: Hidden File, Traffic, Cursor, some aliens, jackdaws, commas, residents of Fido, Mail Snail, the Antivirus and technical support staff, Dead Pixel, bugs, lags, and viruses. The remaining characters were created based on Ivan Mantsurov's smiley pack, meaning they have a spherical shape and some distinctive feature that distinguishes them from the rest. For example, Chelka has pigtails, Brainpot wears glasses, Worker wears a hard hat, and The Evil has a three-day stubble.

=== Main characters ===
- Moji - is a brave and ambitious character with the makings of a superhero. However, his hasty decisions can sometimes prove too ill-considered. That's why he has loyal friends by his side who will always help him come up with a plan @.
- Brainpot, aka Semyon Semyonich - is an erudite and simply literate Kolobok, who never holds anything heavier than a book and has never opened anything but a bottle of kefir. He always has a sensible (or at least somewhat sensible) explanation for anything that happens. He devotes himself to scientific discoveries. He is nicknamed Semyon Semyonich by Moji.
- Chelka - A hero who brings a touch of chaos to the internet world, about which he knows everything. Wherever Glitch is, expect a breakdown, but this doesn't happen by his will—that's just the way it is. However, this quality, besides being an inconvenience, can in some cases be beneficial.
- Polyphagus, aka Ruler Fido - Polyphagus was a virus fighter who, thanks to Dr. Hack's virus, became Ruler Fido, a majestic internet villain with only one goal: to destroy the towns of kolobok emojis for the sake of the prosperity of the world of flats (flat emojis), now almost forgotten on the internet.
- Mydoom - The secondary antagonist of the animated series, a henchman of Ruler Fido, a dangerous virus who also makes a living by stealing postal dogs. He was destroyed by Hack in the final episode of the second season.
- Doctor Hack is the main antagonist of the animated series. He is also a scientist, a traitor, and a Mole, whose main creation was the supervirus that turned Polyphagus into the Ruler of Fido. He also created Mydoom and Point.

=== Supporting characters ===
- Crazy - is a slightly insane loji who loves to be in the thick of things and uses his illogical abilities when doing so.
- Little Angel - is a kind defender of all who are offended.
- Detective - is a hero who prefers to trust professionals, that is, himself. He loves interrogations so much that he can interrogate himself and still end up asuspect. His main weapon is a magnifying glass, which helps him examine even the smallest clues.
- Cursor - is the director of emotional scenes. It is under his sensitive guidance that the koloboks on the Emoticon stage express the emotions with which user Anton imbues his emails.
- Tour Guide (voiced by Nikita Pogodaev) – A guide at the Kolobangi Museum. He knows the entire evolutionary chain of the koloboks.
- Professor Megabit - A scientist who proved that the internet "does exist." He's willing to do anything for his own discoveries, even steal a mailbox and hijack a plane. He's jealous of his professorial status, because he's not the only one in The Mojicons.
- Professor Megabyte - is a scientist who constantly challenges the opinions of his colleague, Professor Megabit. He didn't believe in the possibility of the Internet, because it was nonsense!
- Point - is a former virus. He was once a member of the ruler Fido's gang, but left his illegal activities behind after moving to and meeting the inhabitants of The Mojicons.
- Evil - is a sometimes unbalanced Moji, accustomed to solving everything by force. But there is one creature capable of softening his ardor: Little Fish.
- Mojihov - is a reporter and host of the show "Penalty Circle." No witness to an incident or outrageous statement will escape his microphone.
- Gangster - a criminal element who found the right path thanks to his wife. There's no longer room in his life for breaking the laws of the internet, so he lives in a large and beautiful pink house, but in a ruined world.
- Gangster's Wife - a heroine who carefully protects her family's peace and her husband's reputation, because her "husband is an honest man!"
- Oracle - a fortune teller and failed engineer. She knows everything about the future, aliens, and tomorrow's weather.
- Librarian - a granny with an RPG-7, always at her post in a rocking chair, because "silence is a must in the library."
- Anti-Virus Employees - law enforcement officers responsible for protecting the internet from viruses. They are capable of scanning anyone and placing almost anyone in Quarantine.
- Captain No. 50 - the chief employee of the Anti-Virus.
- Technical Support Staff - are characters always ready to fix, restore, and help. But they aren't always as successful.
- Pioneer - is a gingerbread man who is always ready to help (until the name Maidum is mentioned nearby).
- Trojan - a minion of Ruler Fido, who formed a criminal gang on an abandoned website.
- Atos - a mail dog that delivers letters from the mailbox to the recipient. Without the dog, no email will be sent.
- Browsers (Google Chrome, Opera, Internet Explorer, Firefox, Safari - competing browsers that rent out internet surfboards to Koloboks.
- Oculus - an extremely suspicious self-taught researcher. He dedicates his scientific work to searching for traces of aliens. He even suspects himself of having ties to aliens.
- Elder - the wisest alien, drawing wisdom from the Book of Prophecies.
- Beggar - a conspirator and secret agent for Polyphagus, working undercover as a city beggar.
- Lipsy - a social media star who professionally masters the art of composing daily status updates.
- VDVs - paratroopers who enjoy swimming in the fountain located in the very center of the WikiWiki encyclopedia and also enjoy smashing bricks over their heads.
- Mr. Disconnect - little is known, appeared briefly in episode 25. Can disable hyperlinks and enable incognito mode. He is a henchman of Ruler Fido.

== Episodes ==
=== Season One ===
- 1. And Yet It Exists!
- 2. Mysterious Disappearance
- 3. First Suspects
- 4. Virus Check. No Result
- 5. Internet Portal
- 6. Beyond the Internet
- 7. Hunting for Maidum
- 8. Saving Glitch
- 9. Delete at Any Cost!
- 10. In Search of the Gangster
- 11. Welcome to FidoNet!
- 12. What do aliens want?

=== Season Two ===
- 13. An Unexpected Guest
- 14. Meeting the Oracle
- 15. Colored Prediction
- 16. Shield of Joy
- 17. Internet Surfing
- 18. Crazy Squad
- 19. Secret Stash
- 20. Polyphagu's Beacon
- 21. Social Network
- 22. Escape
- 23. Spam Attack
- 24. Source Code
- 25. Invasion
- 26. We'll Meet Again!

=== Special ===
- Knowledge is power!

== Animated Series Continuation ==
On November 23, 2022, a podcast and interview with the new producer and director, Alexander Romanets, was released on the official YouTube channel. The producer himself announced that the next season of The Mojicons is in production. Also, on December 29, 2023, a video titled Will There Be a Continuation?! was released on the official YouTube channel.

== Awards and nominations ==
- Named among the media industry's most promising animation projects at the 2015 MIPCOM Junior exhibition in Cannes.
- Winner of the Parental Trust Sign 2016 competition in the Multimedia Products for Children.
- Participant in the information program of the Suzdal 2016 festival.
- Participant in the Big Cartoon Festival 2016.
- Участник фестиваля «Мультимир 2017».

== Games ==
The Korean studio Bluepin has developed interactive games featuring the animated series' characters, which are now part of the popular app's lineup Kids World.

== Souvenirs ==
In 2015, Hatber released stationery featuring characters from the animated series.. Danli also released chocolate eggs called The Mojicons with smiley toys inside.
