= Dreamia =

Portuguese television production company

- Industry: Television
- Headquarters: Lisbon, Portugal
- Area served: Portugal, Angola, Mozambique, Cape Verde
- Products: Television channels
- Owner: NOS; AMC Networks International Iberia
- Website: Dreamia

Dreamia (registered as Dreamia - Serviços de Televisão, S.A.) is a producer of thematic channels for the Portuguese and African markets. It is a joint-venture between NOS and AMC Networks International Iberia. It produces the channels distributed by AMC Networks International Iberia.

Dreamia channels are some of the most watched channels in Portuguese cable, with Canal Hollywood regularly surpassing RTP 2's ratings. As of late 2014, the sum of its channels was of 5,5% in share.

== History ==
Dreamia was created as a joint-venture between ZON Multimédia and Chello Multicanal to manage the Portuguese feeds of Canal Hollywood and Canal Panda, the existing Portuguese cable channel MOV and the then-upcoming Panda Biggs channel. Under the agreement, Chello Multicanal would distribute Dreamia's channels to operators in Portugal and Portuguese-speaking countries in Africa.

== Channels ==
- Canal Hollywood - Movie channel, original audio, subtitles in Portuguese.
- Casa e Cozinha - Lifestyle channel, subtitles in Portuguese for international programmes.
- Canal Panda - children's channel, Portuguese audio.
- VinTV - classic programming channel, Portuguese audio and subtitles.
- Blast - Action film channel aimed at the African market with primetime films dubbed in Portuguese.
- Panda Kids - children's channel, Portuguese audio and subtitles.

AMC, História, Odisseia, AMC Break and AMC Crime are operated by the Spanish subsidiary located in Madrid.
