= Pokémon: Diamond and Pearl: Sinnoh League Victors =

Thirteenth season of the Pokémon animated television series

- Season 13
- The English title screen from the Pokémon: Diamond and Pearl: Sinnoh League Victors season
- No. of episodes: 34 + 2 specials (Japanese version); 34 (English version)

Release
- Original network: TV Tokyo
- Original release: January 7 – September 9, 2010

Season chronology
- ← Previous; DP: Galactic Battles Next → Black & White

Pokémon: Diamond and Pearl: Sinnoh League Victors (Note: advertised simply as Pokémon: DP Sinnoh League Victors) is the thirteenth season of the Pokémon anime series and the fourth and final season of Pokémon the Series: Diamond and Pearl, known in Japan as Pocket Monsters Diamond & Pearl (ポケットモンスター ダイヤモンド&パール, Poketto Monsutā Daiyamondo & Pāru). It originally aired in Japan from January 7, 2010, to September 9, 2010, on TV Tokyo and in the United States from June 5, 2010, to February 5, 2011, on Cartoon Network.

The season follows Ash Ketchum as he continues travelling across the Sinnoh region with Brock and Dawn.

== Episode list ==
Jap. overall	Eng. overall	No. in season	English title Japanese title	Original release date	English air date
626	620	1	"Regaining the Home Advantage!" (Loud Roar! Jibacoil vs. Metagross!!); Transliteration: "Bakusō! Jibakoiru Tai Metagurosu!!" (Japanese: 爆走！ジバコイルVSメタグロス！！)	January 7, 2010	June 5, 2010 (Note: This episode was originally set to be broadcast on May 22, 2010, but was pushed back for unknown reasons.)
As Ash and his friends continue their journey to Sunyshore City, they are attacked by a wild Magnezone. As they reach a near-by town, they are informed by Officer Jenny that Magnezone and wild Metagross have suddenly appeared and is wreaking havoc throughout the town. As the group lead the Steel-types to the mountains using their Electric attacks, they meets up with Crispin, a mountain guard, who informs them that Magnezone and Metagross normally battle with each other on a regular basis to release the magnetism that builds up in their bodies, due to the strong magnetic forces emitted from the mountains. Recently, their battle arena (a deep crater) has become filled with water. Ash and co., Officer Jenny and Crispin have to find out why the crater is full of water, and a way to drain it, so Magnezone and Metagross can battle in peace away from the city.
627	621	2	"Short and to the Punch!" (Roaring Freezing Punch! Buoysel vs. Barrierd!!); Transliteration: "Unare Reitō Panchi! Buizeru Tai Bariyādo!!" (Japanese: 唸れれいとうパンチ！ブイゼルVSバリヤード！！)	January 14, 2010	June 12, 2010
After yet another failed attempt to master Draco Meteor, Ash's Gible falls into a lake and has to be saved by Buizel. After the successful rescue, Ash and Buizel are suddenly challenged to a battle by a Black Belt Trainer called Clayton against his Mr. Mime. Ash and Buizel naturally agree, however it soon emerges that this Mr. Mime is a powerful battler and Buizel is easily defeated. Determined to defeat this skilled Trainer and his Pokémon, Ash and Buizel combine their fighting spirits and train hard for the rematch. Ash wins the rematch, and Buizel learns Ice Punch in the process.
628	622	3	"A Marathon Rivalry!" (Get Fired Up, Kabigon! The Pokéthlon King!!); Transliteration: "Moe yo Kabigon! Pokesuron no Ōja!!" (Japanese: 燃えよカビゴン！ポケスロンの王者！！)	January 21, 2010	June 19, 2010
Ash and co. meet a man called Daniel, with a Snorlax who wishes to be the best at Pokéthlon. Ash competes with him and try to gain the title of Pokéthlon King.
629	623	4	"Yes in Dee Dee, It's Dawn!" (Begin! Pokémon Contest – Asatsuki Tournament!!); Transliteration: "Kaimaku! Pokemon Kontesuto, Asatsuki Taikai!!" (Japanese: 開幕！ポケモンコンテスト・アサツキ大会！！)	January 28, 2010	June 26, 2010
The gang finally reach Daybreak Town in time for Dawn's next contest. After her last two losses, Dawn is eager to win her fifth and final ribbon. While there, she meets Ursula again who shows off her new Minun and Plusle, which brings up very uncomfortable memories for Dawn.
630	624	5	"Playing the Performance Encore!" (Double Battle! Vs. Purasuru & Minun!!); Transliteration: "Daburu Batoru! Tai Purasuru, Mainan!!" (Japanese: ダブルバトル！VSプラスル・マイナン！！)	February 4, 2010	July 3, 2010
Dawn is quickly making her way to the finals, but so too is Ursula. Their opponents one by one are being eliminated and the finals remain. Soon the finals pit Dawn and Ursula against each other. Dawn gets off to a good start with good combinations but Ursula's Pokémon have been well trained and prepared as Dawn's every moves are blocked. Eventually, Dawn is able to make a comeback and finally earns her 5th ribbon. She is now confident to face many other coordinators that are participating in the Sinnoh Grand Festival held by Lake Valor. Now, they must journey to Sunyshore City Gym, to face Volkner and to claim Ash's eighth and final badge.
631	625	6	"Fighting Ire with Fire!" (Explosive Evolution! Goukazaru!!); Transliteration: "Baku Shinka! Gōkazaru!!" (Japanese: 爆進化！ゴウカザル!!)	February 11, 2010	July 10, 2010
With the contest over, Ash and friends head over to Sunyshore City. However, Ash's two rivals, Paul and Barry show up. During their meet, they understand through TV that there are only seven ribbons left. Later Barry asks Paul for a battle which he refuses. Instead, Barry and Ash have a battle, with Empoleon vs. Monferno. Monferno was struck by a Hydro Cannon which cause a rampage because its special ability Blaze, was activated, but when Team Rocket snatches Pikachu, Piplup, and Barry's Empoleon, Monferno finally controls his rampage at the last minute and evolves into Infernape. Paul does commend Ash for evolving his Monferno and tells Ash that for the next rematch, they will battle at the Sinnoh League.
632	626	7	"Piplup, Up and Away!" (Pochama Goes Astray!); Transliteration: "Potchama Hagureru!" (Japanese: ポッチャマはぐれる！)	February 18, 2010	July 17, 2010
Ash brings out his Gible to train its Draco Meteor. However, every attempt by Gible falsely hits Piplup, who gets really angry and imagines how everyone will punish Gible and comfort him. Instead, Nobody is angry at Gible and don't consider Piplup's feelings. Devastated, Piplup decides to leave the group and return to Professor Rowan. Using this opportunity, Jessie and James plan to use Piplup to get Pikachu. In the end, everyone apologizes to Piplup, who has also learned Hydro Pump.
633	627	8	"Flint Sparks the Fire!" (Elite Four Ōba and Gym Leader - Denji!); Transliteration: "Shitennō Ōba to Jimu Rīdā, Denji!" (Japanese: 四天王オーバとジムリーダー・デンジ！)	February 25, 2010	July 24, 2010
Ash and his friends have finally arrived in Sunyshore City where Ash is more eager than ever to battle for the final badge he needs to qualify for the Sinnoh League. The group immediately heads to the Gym, but are greeted by an unbelievable sight; a huge pile of badges is placed in front of the Gym so anyone can get one without battling. Ash, who believes that winning them with effort is what makes badges significant, is furious. He persistently tries to enter the Gym, but the high-tech Gym has a prepared machine which manages to capture him. Just then, a spark of light flashes and an Infernape appears, saving Ash from his troubling situation. It emerges that Infernape's trainer is none other than Flint, a member of the Elite Four who specializes in Fire-type Pokémon. Ash and co. soon discover that Volkner, Sunyshore's Gym Leader, is no longer interested in battling. Flint and Ash decide to battle each other to lift his spirits. Ash loses against Flint's Infernape, but is successful in motivating Volkner.
634	628	9	"The Fleeing Tower of Sunyshore!" (Liftoff! Nagisa Tower!!); Transliteration: "Hasshin! Nagisa Tawā!!" (Japanese: 発進！ナギサタワー！！)	March 4, 2010	July 31, 2010
With Ash's battling style motivating Volkner, they are ready to battle, but their battle is interrupted by a power outage which is unusual in Sunyshore City as they have a well designed Power Tower; As they try to figure out what happened, the tower was launched up by Team Rocket. While Ash is battling Team Rocket, Grotle evolves into Torterra and learns Leaf Storm before blasting Team Rocket away. With Sunyshore Gym under repair Ash and Co. head towards Lake Valor.
635	629	10	"Teaching the Student Teacher!" (The Pokémon School at the Seaside!); Transliteration: "Umibe no Pokemon Sukūru!" (Japanese: 海辺のポケモンスクール！)	March 11, 2010	August 7, 2010
With Ash's final gym match delayed, Ash and co. head towards Lake Valor for the Sinnoh Grand Festival. They meet up with Dawn's mother Johanna, who asks them to help out at a school. Meanwhile, Jessie wins her fourth Ribbon at the Tonarino Town Contest.
636	630	11	"Keeping in Top Forme!" (Fly Shaymin! Towards the Far Side of the Sky!!); Transliteration: "Tobe Sheimi! Sora no Kanata e!!" (Japanese: 飛べシェイミ！空の彼方へ！！)	March 18, 2010	August 14, 2010
Ash and company meet Marley, a young woman protecting a Shaymin sought by Team Rocket. They decide to help Marley search for the Gracidea flower needed for Shaymin's transformation to Sky Form, so that it can be set free safely.
637	631	12	"Pokémon Ranger: Heatran Rescue!" (Pokémon Ranger! Heatran Rescue Mission!!); Transliteration: "Pokemon Renjā! Hīdoran Kyūshutsu Sakusen!!" (Japanese: ポケモンレンジャー！ヒードラン救出作戦！！)	March 18, 2010	October 16, 2010
Pokémon Ranger Ben meets the group while pursuing a wild Heatran, which has gone on a rampage. Team Rocket obtain Ben's Capture Styler and attempt to use it to capture Heatran for themselves.
638	632	13	"An Elite Coverup!" (Elite Four Kikuno! Kabarudon vs. Dodaitose!!); Transliteration: "Shitennō Kikuno! Kabarudon Tai Dodaitosu!!" (Japanese: 四天王キクノ！カバルドンVSドダイトス！！)	April 1, 2010	August 21, 2010
Ash and his friends meet Sinnoh Elite Four member Bertha whom specializes in Ground Pokémon. Team Rocket, as always, tries to steal others Pokémon, this time from a young boy. Ash and the team, along with Bertha, stop them. And as always, Ash is eager to battle her, and chooses Torterra against Bertha's Hippowdon, but quickly loses the battle.
639	633	14	"Dawn of a Royal Day!" (Togekiss Dance! The Princess's Pokémon Contest!!); Transliteration: "Togekissu Mau! Ōjosama no Pokemon Kontesuto!!" (Japanese: トゲキッス舞う！王女さまのポケモンコンテスト！！)	April 1, 2010	August 28, 2010
Ash, Dawn, and Brock on their way to Lake Valor enter Arrowroot Town, where a Pokémon Contest is about to start. They meet a princess named Salvia and she wants to participate in the Arrowroot contest, so Dawn and the princess trade spots. Jessie battles Princess Salvia, who wins the ribbon but decides to give it to Jessie for her efforts. Thus, Jessie earns her fifth and final ribbon and qualifies for the Sinnoh Grand Festival, and Princess Salvia gives Togekiss to Dawn.
640	634	15	"With the Easiest of Grace!" (Togekiss! The Magnificent Battle!!); Transliteration: "Togekissu! Kareinaru Batoru!!" (Japanese: トゲキッス！華麗なるバトル！！)	April 15, 2010	September 4, 2010
As the Team heads through the plains, its time for Dawn's practice with Togekiss for the Sinnoh Grand Festival. Togekiss is very much excited to show its elegance, but tries to showcase its look by taking hits of Gible's Attacks. Dawn tries to make Togekiss understand the battle styles with magnificent looks. The situation worsens when Team Rocket shows up, planning to steal Togekiss.
641	635	16	"Dealing with a Fierce Double Ditto Drama!" (Metamon – Transformation Battle! Which One is the Real One!?); Transliteration: "Metamon Henshin Batoru! Honmono wa Dotchi~nyo!?" (Japanese: メタモン・へんしんバトル！本物はドッチ～ニョ！？)	April 22, 2010	September 11, 2010
Ash and friends meet up with a trainer with two Dittos — one is normal, the other one is shiny — who asks Ash to battle her. Without much of Pokémon knowledge she makes the wrong choice of Pokémon in Ditto's transformation, Ash's Infernape beats her Ditto which transforms to Infernape, and Ash's Pikachu beats her other Ditto which transforms to Piplup and Pikachu. Brock helps her about the Ditto's transformation and knowledge on other Pokémon. Finally, the team arrives in Lake Valor for the Sinnoh Grand Festival.
642	636	17	"Last Call-First Round!" (Grand Festival! The Art of Flame and Ice!!); Transliteration: "Gurando Fesutibaru Kaimaku! Honō to Kōri no Āto!!" (Japanese: グランドフェスティバル開幕！炎と氷のアート！！)	April 29, 2010	September 18, 2010
The team enters the Sinnoh Grand Festival where Dawn meets Nando, Kenny, Ursula, Zoey and Jessie, who are also competing in the Sinnoh Grand Festival. During the First Round, Ursula uses two Eevees which have evolved into Flareon and Vaporeon, Nando uses Altaria and Kricketot, Zoey uses Gastrodon and Lumineon, Jessilina uses Seviper and Yanmega, Kenny uses Empoleon and Floatzel and the Sinnoh Grand Festival continues with others. Kenny's performance is flawed when his Empoleon's Flash Cannon hits Floatzel's Whirlpool which knocks Floatzel down. At the end of the day, the results are announced except Kenny's. Dawn's rivals, including herself, makes it to the Battle Round. Kenny leaves Lake Valor to train even harder with his Pokémon.
643	637	18	"Opposites Interact!" (Mammoo, Pachirisu! The Ice Chandelier is Chosen!!); Transliteration: "Manmū, Pachirisu! Kimero Kōri no Shanderia!!" (Japanese: マンムー、パチリス！決めろ氷のシャンデリア！！)	May 6, 2010	September 25, 2010
The first contest battle begins between Ursula and Dawn. Ursula uses Gabite and Flareon. When Ursula is on the way to win, Dawn uses an Ice Chandelier combination, With only 7 seconds remaining, Dawn tells her Pokémon make the combination again and beat both Gabite and Flareon. Dawn makes it to the Top 16. At the end of the day, Zoey, Jessilina and Nando also move onto Top 16 in the Sinnoh Grand Festival.
644	638	19	"Coming Full-Festival Circle!" (The Semi-Finals! Who is Heading to the Finals!?); Transliteration: "Semifainaru! Kesshō e Susumu no wa!?" (Japanese: セミファイナル！決勝へ進むのは！？)	May 13, 2010	October 2, 2010
Dawn, Zoey, Jessilina and Nando are in the Top 4. The first battle for the day is Nando's Lopunny and Kricketune against Zoey's Leafeon and Mismagius. The second battle is Dawn versus Jessilina's Carnivine and Seviper. At the end of the battles the two coordinators who are in the Sinnoh Grand Festival Finals are Dawn and Zoey.
645	639	20	"A Grand Fight for Winning!" (Conclusive Rival Showdown! Hikari vs. Nozomi!!); Transliteration: "Ketchaku Raibaru Taiketsu! Hikari Tai Nozomi!!" (Japanese: 決着ライバル対決！ヒカリVSノゾミ！！)	May 20, 2010	October 9, 2010
In the final round of the Sinnoh Grand Festival, the battle between Dawn and Zoey begins. Zoey uses Glameow and Gallade, while Dawn uses Piplup and Togekiss. During the battle Zoey uses Dawn's combinations to make her Pokémon powerful and beautiful. In the last seconds they both make a combination with their Pokémon. With a blinding light, the two combination attacks collide which causes a gigantic explosion that sends a strong gust of wind. Then they announce the winner who turns out to be not Dawn, but Zoey just by the smallest number of points. Zoey then happily hugs Glameow and Gallade for her victory, while Dawn becomes sad by losing. After the Sinnoh Grand Festival is over, Nurse Joy informs Ash that Volkner is back and ready for a battle with him.
646	640	21	"For the Love of Meowth!" (Goodbye Team Rocket! Love of Nyarth!?); Transliteration: "Sayonara Roketto-dan! Nyāsu no Koi!?" (Japanese: さよならロケット団！ニャースの恋！？)	May 27, 2010	October 23, 2010
With the Sinnoh Grand Festival over, Ash and friends begin to head back to Sunyshore City for Ash's final Gym battle with Volkner. As usual, Team Rocket pursues them. But when Meowth falls in love with a Trainer's Glameow and decides to leave Team Rocket, Jessie and James enlist the help of Ash and friends to get Meowth back.
647	641	22	"The Eighth Wonder of the Sinnoh World!" (Electric Shock Battle! The Final Badge!!); Transliteration: "Dengeki Batoru! Saigo no Bajji!!" (Japanese: 電撃バトル！最後のバッジ！！)	June 3, 2010	October 30, 2010
Ash battles Volkner for his last gym badge. Ash uses Torterra first, but it loses to Volkner's Electivire. Pikachu then defeats it. Next is Jolteon and Infernape and Infernape wins. Luxray is Volkner's last Pokémon and Ash sends out Pikachu again, but it loses. Infernape is Ash's last hope, but it gets hit one time after another. Being hurt badly Infernape's ability Blaze is then activated, but with Ash's friendship and trust on Infernape, it is able control it now. With one-after-another powerful attacks, Infernape keeps weakening Luxray. With a final powerful Flame Wheel attack, Infernape beats Luxray, giving Ash his eighth and final badge to finally enter the Sinnoh League.
648	642	23	"Four Roads Diverged in a Pokémon Port!" (Satoshi vs. Kengo! Respective Departure!!); Transliteration: "Satoshi Tai Kengo! Sorezore no Funade!!" (Japanese: サトシVSケンゴ！それぞれの船出！！)	June 10, 2010	November 6, 2010
Having earned his eighth and final badge, it is time for Ash to head off to the Lily of the Valley Island for the Sinnoh League Conference. However, as they leave Sunnyshore City, Ash & Co. meet both Dawn's rival, Kenny and their old friend Jasmine, the Olivine City Gym Leader in Johto region. Kenny eagerly challenges Ash to a battle to which Ash accepts with the stipulation that, should Kenny win, Dawn would agree to accompany him on a journey, just the two of them. In addition to that, Jasmine and Flint also have a training battle. Kenny wins his battle with Ash, but despite the outcome, Dawn turns down his offer and decides to follow a separate path after traveling with Ash to the Sinnoh League Lily of the Valley Conference.
649	643	24	"Bucking the Treasure Trend!" (Treasure Hunter – Baku and Yajilon!); Transliteration: "Torejā Hantā – Baku to Yajiron!" (Japanese: トレジャーハンター・バクとヤジロン！)	June 17, 2010	November 13, 2010
On their way to the Lily of the Valley Conference, Ash & Co. meet up with Flint's brother, Buck, a treasure hunter eager to find treasure on a nearby island. Buck requests the assistance of Ash & Co. in finding this treasure. However, Team Rocket also overhear this information and decide to get the treasure for themselves. Buck and co. find a ruin and a Claydol is guarding it. Buck catches the Claydol and the treasure turns out to be vases and other stuff.
650	644	25	"An Old Family Blend!" (Eve of Fierce Battle! The Great Gathering of Satoshi's Pokémon!!); Transliteration: "Nessen Zen'ya! Satoshi no Pokemon Daishūgō!!" (Japanese: 熱戦前夜！サトシのポケモン大集合！！)	June 24, 2010	November 20, 2010
It's almost time for the Lily of the Valley Conference, and in training, Ash has decided to get all of his Reserved Pokémon together for some training and to decide who to use in the upcoming Lily of the Valley. However, when they arrive in Sinnoh, they all were released from their Poké Balls and are playing about nearby. To top it off, Team Rocket arrives with a dastardly scheme to capture all of Ash's Pokémon. But the Poké Balls get separated from Team Rocket when they're hit by Pikachu's Thunderbolt again, so Ash and co. searches and finds Totodile, Corphish, Snorlax and Bayleef. Cyndaquil is left, but Team Rocket finds it first. It then uses its new move Flame Wheel to crash into a tree and set it on fire. Ash and the others see the smoke and find it. They then destroy the machine but it fixes itself, and Team Rocket goes after Cyndaquil again. Just as they reach for it, Cyndaquil evolves into Quilava and learns the extremely powerful Eruption to blast off Team Rocket. Afterwards, Glalie, Torkoal, Noctowl, Donphan and Muk show up so Ash can start his training session. At the Lily of the Valley Conference, he sees that his rivals Barry, Conway, Nando, and Paul are all there. At last, the Sinnoh League Lily of the Valley Conference begins and Ash's first opponent will be Nando.
651	645	26	"League Unleashed!" (Begin! Sinnoh League – Suzuran Tournament!!); Transliteration: "Kaimaku! Shin'ō Rīgu – Suzuran Taikai!!" (Japanese: 開幕！シンオウリーグ・スズラン大会！！)	July 1, 2010	November 27, 2010
Finally, it's time for the Sinnoh League Lily of the Valley Conference. And Ash soon discovers that his preliminary battle in the First Round is against Nando – the Pokémon minstrel and the first trainer he befriended in Sinnoh. Ash decides to use his Quilava, Heracross and Staraptor, as Nando sends out Roserade, Kricketune and Armaldo. At first Nando takes the initiative, but later Ash grasps the situation gradually, by understanding Nando's style and rhythm. During the battle, Ash's Staraptor battled Nando's Roserade. After a few problems, Staraptor defeats Roserade, but is quickly defeated by his Armaldo. Quilava learns Aerial Ace and ends up fainting in a tie with Armaldo. Using Heracross against Nando's Kricketune, Ash defeats Nando, and moves on to his next match in the Second Round. Meanwhile, Barry, Conway and Paul also make it through the preliminaries. Meanwhile, talks of an incredibly powerful Trainer named Tobias with a Mythical Pokémon Darkrai begin to stir up.
652	646	27	"Casting a Paul on Barry!" (The Third-Round Battle of Sinnoh League! Shinji Against Jun!!); Transliteration: "Shin'ō Rīgu San Kaisen! Shinji Tai Jun!!" (Japanese: シンオウリーグ三回戦！シンジ対ジュン！！)	July 15, 2010	December 4, 2010
After Ash defeats his opponent in round 2, Paul, Barry, Conway also move to round 3. Ash discovers that his next opponent is Conway and that the upcoming battle is between Paul and Barry. Doing some research on their opponents, Ash, Barry and Paul each learn something about their opponents while Conway learns more about Tobias, who apparently managed to win all of his badges with just nothing but his Darkrai. When the battle between Barry and Paul begins, Paul's sends out his Magmortar, who easily defeats Barry's Skarmory after it using Spikes and because of Magmortar's power packed Flamethrower. Next, Barry send out Empoleon and Paul recalls it because of Magmortar suffer damage to Empoleon's strongest Hydro Cannon. Then, after a close battle, Paul's Ursaring defeats Barry's Hitmonlee, even though Hitmonlee got a powerful Blaze Kick, but Paul recalls Ursaring because of Empoleon seem to be to tough and sends out Electivire. After a fierce battle between Paul's Electivire and Empoleon with its special ability Torrent, which increases the strength of Water type moves when it has taken severe damage, but ends up fainting to Paul's Electivire and so Barry is eliminated.
653	647	28	"Working on a Right Move!" (Trick Room of Terror! Satoshi Against Kouhei!!); Transliteration: "Kyōfu no Torikku Rūmu! Satoshi Tai Kōhei!!" (Japanese: 恐怖のトリックルーム！サトシ対コウヘイ！！)	July 22, 2010	December 11, 2010
The next battle is between Ash and Conway. Ash's Infernape learns the ultra powerful Flare Blitz and Gible masters his Draco Meteor. Originally, Ash was going to use Infernape, Torterra and Glalie but feeling power was not enough (and Conway was secretly looking at Ash's Team), Ash faces Conway with Noctowl, Gible and Donphan. Ash knocks out Conway's Shuckle with Gible and Lickilicky with Noctowl, but Conway's Dusknoir knocks out Noctowl and Donphan because of a move called Trick Room. With Gible and Dusknoir taken a lot of damage each, it looks as though neither side has the clear advantage until Gible bites through Dusknoir's Shadow Punch, unleashes Draco Meteor again, and knocks out Dusknoir with a well-aimed Dragon Pulse. Ash moves on, and enters in the Top 8 along with Paul, and Tobias. For the Lily of the Valley Conference Quarterfinals, Ash discovers that he will be battling Paul, during which Ash's Gliscor returns.
654	648	29	"Familiarity Breeds Strategy!" (Rival Decisive Battle! Satoshi Against Shinji!!); Transliteration: "Raibaru Kessen! Satoshi Tai Shinji!!" (Japanese: ライバル決戦！サトシ対シンジ！！)	August 5, 2010	December 18, 2010
Ash and Paul are about to start their Full Battle and Ash decides to stick with the same team he had against Paul during there Full Battle at Lake Acuity. Paul chooses Aggron and Ash chooses Pikachu. After a fierce battle, Ash recalls Pikachu for Infernape who beats Aggron with a fast Mach Punch. Paul's next Pokémon is Gastrodon and Ash recalls Infernape for Staraptor. Staraptor hits Gastrodon with a Quick Attack. Paul surprises everyone by making Gastrodon do the Counter Shield with Muddy Water. Staraptor tries to hit Gastrodon with Aerial Ace but Gastrodon dodges it and hits Staraptor with a Body Slam. Gastrodon used Water Pulse and shot it up in the air to gain power when it hit Staraptor. Luckily it got out by using Close Combat on the floor. Ash recalls Staraptor because it took damage from Gastrodon's Ice Beam. Ash sends out Buizel and by taking Gastrodon's Ice Beam it did the Ice-Aqua Jet to Gastrodon. Gastrodon tries to hit Buizel with a Body Slam, but Buizel finishes Gastrodon with a powerful Ice Punch. Paul's next Pokémon is Drapion. It used Pin Missile on Buizel, who manages to block it with its Counter Shield. Drapion then used Cross Poison, but Buizel dodged it and did Sonicboom at Drapion's back. However, Drapion blocked it with its tail, and Drapion caught Buizel with its tail. Even though Ash is in the lead, Paul's counterattack has begun.
655	649	30	"A Real Rival Rouser!" (Intense Fighting Full Battle! Satoshi Against Shinji!!); Transliteration: "Gekitō Furu Batoru! Satoshi Tai Shinji!!" (Japanese: 激闘フルバトル！サトシ対シンジ！！)	August 12, 2010	January 8, 2011
Ash and Paul continue their Full Battle. Drapion managed to defeat both Buizel and Staraptor. Ash sends out Torterra and it did some damage to Drapion utilizing Energy Ball, Leaf Storm, and Rock Climb. But Drapion still manage to defeat Torterra even at a disadvantage. Paul recalls Drapion and send out Ninjask, while pointing out his real plan-sacrifice Aggron and Gastrodon to learn what Ash is using for his team. Ash sends out Gliscor. After a tough battle, Ash recalls Gliscor for Infernape. It used Flare Blitz on the underground to get rid of Toxic Spikes. Infernape finished Ninjask with a powerful Mach Punch. Paul's next Pokémon was Froslass and Ash recalls Infernape for Pikachu. After a tough battle, Pikachu beats Froslass with ultra powerful Volt Tackle. Paul send out Drapion and Ash recalls Pikachu for Gliscor. Both Ash and Paul are ready to battle to their fullest. For once, Paul does acknowledge Ash's worth as Trainer.
656	650	31	"Battling a Thaw in Relations!" (Conclusive Rival Battle! Satoshi Against Shinji!!); Transliteration: "Ketchaku Raibaru Batoru! Satoshi Tai Shinji!!" (Japanese: 決着ライバルバトル！サトシ対シンジ！！)	August 19, 2010	January 15, 2011
Gliscor manages to strike down with X-Scissor, but Drapion hits Gliscor with Pin Missile multiple times. Then, Gliscor dodges Cross Poison and burns Drapion with Fire Fang, finally defeating Drapion and leaving Paul with Electivire. Electivire uses Thunder on the ground and chunks of earth hit Gliscor, defeating him. Then, due to Electivire's immunity to Electric-type attacks, Pikachu falls in battle and is replaced by Infernape. Infernape and Electivire are at powerful clashes of Thunder Punch with Mach Punch, and Flamethrower and Thunder. Then, when Electivire grabs Infernape's arm, he inflicted a powerful Thunder attack, but is at a disadvantage when Infernape activates its signature trump card - ability Blaze. Infernape charges with ultra powerful Flare Blitz and Electivire counterattacks with most powerful Giga Impact. Both Pokémon cause a huge explosion but Electivire is overwhelmed by Infernape's Flare Blitz (powered up by Blaze) and ultimately falls to Infernape due to the impact. Ash finally defeats Paul and moves ahead onto the semifinals to enter in the Top 4 of the Lily of the Valley Conference. Paul tells Ash that he is going to see Pyramid King Brandon and ask for a rematch, and they both agree to eventually battle again one day, with the hatred between them turning to friendship, as well as acknowledging Infernape's growth. The Sinnoh League Champion Cynthia says that both Ash and Paul will be champions (like her) someday and that she awaits that day. Ash's next opponent is revealed to be Tobias (the Trainer with Darkrai).
657	651	32	"The Semi-Final Frontier!" (Sinnoh League Semi-Final! Darkrai Appears!!); Transliteration: "Shin'ō Rīgu Junkesshō! Dākurai Tōjō!!" (Japanese: シンオウリーグ準決勝！ダークライ登場！！)	August 26, 2010	January 22, 2011
After his biggest victory over Paul, Ash discovers that his next match is against the strongest contender in the entire Sinnoh League Lily of the Valley Conference, Tobias. Who has easily won every battle, to reach the semifinals using only his Darkrai, who is able to easily take out Ash's Heracross, Torkoal and Gible using its Dark Void, Ice Beam, Dream Eater and Dark Pulse attacks. Ash brings out Sceptile, which manages to defeat Darkrai using Leaf Blade. This becomes the very first time for Tobias to have lost a single Pokémon up to the semifinals in the Lily of the Valley Conference. However, Tobias surprises everyone with his second Pokémon, the Legendary Pokémon Latios, who defeats Sceptile with Giga Impact. Ash sends out Swellow, only to be defeated by Latios's Luster Purge very quickly. Ash's final Pokémon is Pikachu. After a long battle, both Pikachu and Latios are declared unable to battle, Ash loses the battle and Tobias wins the semifinal. Elsewhere, Paul watches the battle on television and walks away saddened by the outcome. With just Darkrai, Tobias wins the Lily of the Valley Conference and becomes the Lily of the Valley Conference Champion.
658	652	33	"The Brockster Is In!" (Pokémon Doctor – Takeshi!); Transliteration: "Pokemon Dokutā – Takeshi!" (Japanese: ポケモンドクター・タケシ！)	September 2, 2010	January 29, 2011
On their way back to Twinleaf Town after the Sinnoh League Lily of the Valley Conference has come to an end, Ash, Dawn, and Brock are to part ways soon. Meanwhile, being on a ship, Team Rocket, in a submarine enrage a group of Tentacruel. Team Rocket manages to come on the ship, which Ash, Brock, and Dawn are on. Due to this, before calming down, the Tentacruel badly poison 7 Pokémon on board. Nurse Joy was too far from the ship to be able to reach in time and help the sick Pokémon. With her not there, Brock tries to save them. Despite Team Rocket leaving only one Pecha Berry and with no poisoning antidotes, Brock, Ash, and Dawn don't give up. Asking other passengers on the ship, they are able to find 2 more Pecha Berries, some Heal Powder and a Lava Cookie is also given to them by an old female passenger. Brock makes medicine with the ingredients for the sick Pokémon. 6 of the Pokémon begin healing, but Pichu being harshly affected by the poison of the Tentacruel, the medicine is not able to help it heal. Brock makes an energy drink with some Oran and Durin Berries, but Pichu, although very sick, denies to take the drink. Happiny, not able to see Pichu suffering, evolves into Chansey and using the move Softboiled on Pichu, begins healing it. All the 7 Pokémon are eventually cured of their poisoning. When Nurse Joy reaches the ship, she tells Brock he can become a great Pokémon Doctor, if he wants to. Hearing this, Brock decides to change his goals and goes for his new goal, becoming a Pokémon Doctor.
659	653	34	"Memories Are Made of Bliss!" (Memories Are Pearls! Friendship is a Diamond!!); Transliteration: "Omoide wa Pāru! Yūjō wa Daiyamondo!!" (Japanese: 思い出はパール！友情はダイヤモンド！！)	September 9, 2010	February 5, 2011
The gang go their separate ways, but this proves to be too much for Piplup, so it runs away. Their Pokémon find Piplup, but Team Rocket catches them. Ash and his team save the Pokémon, making Team Rocket blasting off again. Dawn confronts Piplup and tells it that they have to depart and the team sees a battle between Cynthia and Flint, and Cynthia wins the battle. Ash decides to continue his journey to be a Pokémon Master, Brock wants to be Pokémon Doctor, and Dawn wants to be a Top Coordinator. At the pier, Ash and Dawn exchange their final high five and Ash, Brock, and Pikachu say goodbye to Dawn and Piplup. As the ship departs, Ash yells out to cheer Dawn. Ash and Brock set off to Kanto and say goodbye to each other, with Brock turning towards Pewter City, and Ash and Pikachu returning to Pallet Town. They run the rest of the road, and at a new sunrise, bring their Sinnoh region journey to an end and bringing up a new adventure in Unova region.

=== Special episodes ===
Jap. overall	No. in season	Japanese title	Original release date
SP–1	SP–1	"Hikari - Setting Off on a New Journey!"; Transliteration: "Hikari - Arata Naru Tabidachi!" (Japanese: ヒカリ・新たなる旅立ち！)	February 3, 2011
After concluding her journey with Ash and Brock, Dawn returns home and has to decide which of her Pokémon to take with her on her journey to become a Top Coordinator. The morning after, Johanna goes to Dawn's bed and tries to wake her up, only to find that Dawn had already woken up. Johanna goes outside to check if Dawn is there, and sees that Dawn is practicing with Cyndaquil. Cyndaquil uses a Swift and Flame Wheel combination which impresses Johanna.
SP–2	SP–2	"Nibi Gym - The Greatest Crisis Ever!"; Transliteration: "Nibi Jimu - Shinjō Saidai no Kiki!" (Japanese: ニビジム・史上最大の危機！)	February 3, 2011
After his journey with Ash and Dawn, Brock has returned home to Pewter City to take care of his siblings as well as studying towards gaining entry to a training school for Pokémon Doctors. Two of Brock's younger siblings come into his room and let him know that it is time for lunch. Brock gathers his siblings to the kitchen so that he can make them lunch, since their parents are away on yet another vacation.

== Music ==
The Japanese opening songs are "The Greatest - Everyday!" (サイコー・エブリディ!, Saikō - Eburidei!) by Fumie Akiyoshi for 25 episodes, and "The Greatest - Everyday! (BAND VERSION)" (サイコー・エブリディ! BAND VERSION, Saikō - Eburidei! BAND VERSION) by Fumie Akiyoshi with THE GREATEST BAND for 11 episodes. The ending songs are "Which One 〜 Is It?" (ドッチ〜ニョ？, Dotchi〜Nyo?) by MooMoo Milk and Araki-san for 25 episodes, "In Your Heart, LaLaLa" (君の胸にLaLaLa, Kimi no Mune Ni LaLaLa) by MADOKA for 11 episodes, and the English opening song is "We Will Carry On!" by Adam Elk. Its instrumental version serves as the ending theme.

== Home media releases ==
Viz Media and Warner Home Video released the entire series in three DVD box sets in the United States in 2012.

Viz Media and Warner Home Video released Pokémon the Series Diamond and Pearl: Sinnoh League Victors – The Complete Season on DVD on February 23, 2021.
