= Pokémon the Series: Black & White =

Fourteenth season of the Pokémon animated television series

- Season 14
- Japanese title logo for the Pocket Monsters: Best Wishes! series (top); English title logo from the Pokémon: Black & White season (bottom)
- No. of episodes: 50 (Japanese version); 48 (English version)

Release
- Original network: TV Tokyo
- Original release: September 23, 2010 – September 15, 2011

Season chronology
- ← Previous; DP: Sinnoh; League Victors Next → BW: Rival Destinies

Pokémon: Black & White is the fourteenth season of the Pokémon anime series and the first and titular season of Pokémon the Series: Black & White, known in Japan as Pocket Monsters: Best Wishes! (ポケットモンスター ベストウイッシュ, Poketto Monsutā Besuto Uisshu!). It originally aired in Japan from September 23, 2010, to September 15, 2011, on TV Tokyo channel 7, and in the United States from February 12, 2011, to January 7, 2012, on Cartoon Network.

The season follows Ash Ketchum as he travels across the Unova region to challenge its Pokémon League while joined by Iris, an aspiring Dragon Master, and Cilan, one of the Striaton City Gym Leaders and a Pokémon Connoisseur.

== Toys "R" Us promotion ==
To promote the series and the episode where Ash obtains an egg, Pokémon Black and White players were able to obtain an egg containing either an Axew, a Pansage or a Pidove toy, exclusively at US Toys "R" Us stores between April 27, 2011, and May 31, 2011. Each one contained their moves like anime counterparts (Ash's Pidove, Cilan's Pansage and Iris' Axew). Players were only able to get one egg and which of the Pokémon the egg hatched into was random.

== Episode list ==
Jap. overall	Eng. overall	No. in season	English title Japanese title	Original release date	English air date
660	654	1	"In the Shadow of Zekrom!" (To the Isshu Region! Zekrom's Shadow!!); Transliteration: "Isshu Chihō e! Zekuromu no Kage!!" (Japanese: イッシュ地方へ！ゼクロムの影！！)	September 23, 2010	February 12, 2011
Ash, Pikachu, Ash's mother Delia, and Professor Oak head off for a trip to the Unova region. A strange black cloud forms overhead, and it hits Ash's Pikachu with a lightning bolt. After meeting up with Professor Aurea Juniper, Unova's lead Pokémon researcher, Ash encounters Trip, who is beginning his Pokémon League challenge with the Grass-type Pokémon Snivy, rather than the Fire-type Tepig or the Water-type Oshawott. In a practice match against Trip, it is discovered that Pikachu can no longer use Electric-type moves, which Juniper attributes to the lightning bolt caused by the Legendary Pokémon, Zekrom.
661	655	2	"Enter Iris and Axew!" (Iris and Kibago!); Transliteration: "Airisu to Kibago!" (Japanese: アイリスとキバゴ！)	September 23, 2010	February 12, 2011
After the strange black cloud disappears, Pikachu's Electric moves are restored. Professor Juniper gives Ash a new Pokédex and Poké Balls so he can begin his journey in Unova. On his way, he discovers an Axew belonging to a trainer named Iris. Ash sees a flock of Pidove and battles one of them, capturing it. When Team Rocket appears and tries to steal Pikachu and Axew, Ash tries to use his new Pidove against Jessie and her new Woobat, but Pidove is overpowered. However, an Oshawott from Juniper's lab appears and saves Pikachu and Axew. Team Rocket gets away when James throws a smoke pilet. Ash and Iris take their Pokémon to a Pokémon Center, where Iris decides to travel with Ash and Pikachu through Unova, as she knows her way around the region. As the two head off, Oshawott watches from afar.
662	656	3	"A Sandile Gusher of Change!" (Mijumaru! Meguroco! Critical Moment!!); Transliteration: "Mijumaru! Meguroko! Kikkiippatsu!!" (Japanese: ミジュマル！メグロコ！危機一髪！！)	September 30, 2010	February 19, 2011
While on their way to the first Gym, Ash and Iris realize that they are being followed by the Oshawott from Professor Juniper's lab. They find out it wants to be captured by Ash because he called it very cute. Professor Juniper sends Ash Oshawott's Poké Ball, but Oshawott disappears before he can be recaptured. They soon come across a boy named Dan, whose father owns a resort with a sand spa that has been disrupted by a group of Sandile, led by one of them that wears sunglasses. After coming across Oshawott and Team Rocket again, Ash, Iris, and Dan discover that the Sandile were trying to get help for a group of Pidove, Deerling, and Patrat from a hot spring with the hot flooding. When it makes a hot river and traps the other Pokémon on a small island, the Sandile form a bridge to save them, but Ash is trapped on the island when their grip fails. When another flood comes behind Ash, Oshawott manages to save him with a Water Gun. However after using the move, Oshawott almost falls into the hot river, and Ash uses the opportunity to recapture Oshawott.
663	657	4	"The Battle Club and Tepig's Choice!" (Battle Club! A Mysterious Pokémon Appears!!); Transliteration: "Batoru Kurabu! Nazo no Pokemon Arawareru!!" (Japanese: バトルクラブ！謎のポケモン現る！！)	October 7, 2010	February 26, 2011
Ash and Iris are on their way to Striaton City Gym. At Accumula Town, they find the Battle Club owned by Don George. After watching a battle between a Servine and a Dewott, Ash challenges the Dewott's owner just before a security breach occurs. Ash sees a Pokémon's dark shape on the security tape, and mistakes it for an Umbreon, only to find an abandoned Tepig with a rope tied around its snout, during which Team Rocket arrives to raid the storage to capture Pikachu.
664	658	5	"Triple Leaders, Team Threats!" (San'yō Gym! Vs. Baoppu, Hiyappu and Yanappu!!); Transliteration: "San'yō Jimu! Tai Baoppu, Hiyappu, Yanappu!!" (Japanese: サンヨウジム！VSバオップ、ヒヤップ、ヤナップ！！)	October 14, 2010	March 5, 2011
Ash and Iris finally reach Striaton City, where they meet and challenge Pokémon Connoisseur Cilan and his brothers, Chili and Cress, to a battle.
665	659	6	"Dreams by the Yard Full!" (Former Building Site of Dreams! Munna and Musharna!!); Transliteration: "Yume no Atochi! Munna to Mushāna!!" (Japanese: 夢の跡地！ムンナとムシャーナ！！)	October 21, 2010	March 12, 2011
Ash has earned the Trio Badge at the Striaton City Gym, but Iris' Axew is falling ill. Meanwhile, Team Rocket finds the Dreamyard and sets up a device, only to disturb a sleeping Pokémon.
666	660	7	"Snivy Plays Hard to Catch!" (Get the Tsutarja That Knows Attract!?); Transliteration: "Tsutāja Getto de Meromero!?" (Japanese: ツタージャ・ゲットでメロメロ！？)	October 28, 2010	March 19, 2011
While having lunch on the way to the next city, Cilan discovers that all the food he prepared has been stolen. The group discovers that the thief is a female Snivy. Ash attempts to capture it, but it uses attract on Pikachu, leaving him unable to fight her. Ash then tries to catch Snivy using all of his other Pokémon.
667	661	8	"Saving Darmanitan from the Bell!" (Darumakka and Hihidaruma! Secret of the Clocktower!!); Transliteration: "Darumakka to Hihidaruma! Dokeitō no Himitsu!!" (Japanese: ダルマッカとヒヒダルマ！時計塔の秘密！！)	November 4, 2010	March 26, 2011
Ash and the gang are approached by a Darumaka, while another steals their lunch. Ash sends Oshawott to battle them, but it is defeated. Nurse Joy tells them that the Darumaka have been stealing food all over town. When the Darumaka steal from the Pokémon Center, Ash chases them. Meanwhile Team Rocket receives a briefcase from their contact. In a clock tower, Ash battles the Darumaka, and they point the group to Darmanitan, who is in Zen Mode to prevent one of the bells from falling down. Ash and Cilan make a new hook to hang the bell, and Darmanitan helps them attach it with its psychic powers, before taking itself out of Zen Mode to finally fix the clock tower's bell.
668	662	9	"The Bloom Is on Axew!" (Out of Control Pendror! Rescue Kibago!); Transliteration: "Pendorā Bōsō! Kibago o Sukue!" (Japanese: ペンドラー暴走！キバゴを救え！)	November 11, 2010	April 2, 2011
Cilan and Iris have a match between Pansage and Axew; Pansage is told to hold back until Axew uses a powerful Dragon Rage, which keeps coming out as a "Dragon Sneeze". Elsewhere, Team Rocket is briefed on a meteor that had fallen in the Unova region, creating its current appearance. Iris tells the others how she was given Axew by an elder in her hometown. Unknown to them, Axew has gotten stuck in the antennae of a Scolipede, causing the Scolipede to rampage. When Pikachu helps track down the Scolipede, Iris sends out her Excadrill to fight the Scolipede, but Excadrill does not obey her at first, remaining in inactive mode. When they finally free Axew, Excadrill finally decides to fight the Scolipede, sending it away flying. It lets out a victory cry before clattering back into inactive mode. Elsewhere, Team Rocket meets up with their local Unova contact, Pierce (フリント, Furinto).
669	663	10	"A Rival Battle for Club Champ!!" (Rival Battle! Tough Enemy Pururiru!!); Transliteration: "Raibaru Batoru! Kyōteki Pururiru!!" (Japanese: ライバルバトル！強敵プルリル！！)	November 18, 2010	April 9, 2011
Ash, Iris, and Cilan meet up with Trip once again on the way to Nacrene City, after they stop by a Battle Club owned by another Don George, and Ash challenges Trip to a 5-on-5 battle, which Ash loses due to the fact that his Snivy keeps using the same moves over and over again.
670	664	11	"A Home for Dwebble!" (Ishizumai! Take Back Your Home!!); Transliteration: "Ishizumai! Jibun no Ie o Torimodose!!" (Japanese: イシズマイ！自分の家をとりもどせ！！)	December 2, 2010	April 16, 2011
While on their way to Nacrene City, Axew notices a strange Pokémon that Cilan reveals is the Rock Hermit Pokémon Dwebble. The Dwebble is making a new shell out of a rock, when it is attacked by three other Dwebble which steal its new rocky shell. Elsewhere, Team Rocket receives intel on their next heist: stealing information from a laboratory.
671	665	12	"Here Comes the Trubbish Squad!" (The Yabukuron Squad and a Secret Base!?); Transliteration: "Yabukuron Sentai to Himitsukichi!?" (Japanese: ヤブクロン戦隊と秘密基地！？)	December 9, 2010	April 23, 2011
On their way to Nacrene City, the gang is harassed by a group of schoolchildren with the Garbage Pokémon Trubbish. They head to a nearby Pokémon Daycare and kindergarten, where they learn from the kids' teacher, Ms. Daniela, that the kids found the Trubbish at the garbage dump and decided to bring it back to the school against her orders. Ash later challenges Ms. Daniela, and wins, earning a Pokémon Egg. Elsewhere, Team Rocket is given a fake meteorite from Flint and are told that they will get more information later.
672	666	13	"Minccino–Neat and Tidy!" (Chillarmy is Clean!?); Transliteration: "Chirāmyi wa Kireizuki!?" (Japanese: チラーミィはきれいずき！？)	December 16, 2010	April 30, 2011
Ash meets up with Bianca, who was sent by Professor Juniper to deliver a Badge Case to Ash. Just as Ash puts his Trio Badge in the case, it is stolen by the Chinchilla Pokémon, Minccino, who is trying to clean it.
673	667	14	"A Night in the Nacrene City Museum!" (Shippō City! Museum Adventure!!); Transliteration: "Shippō Shiti! Hakubutsukan de Daibōken!!" (Japanese: シッポウシティ！博物館で大冒険！！)	December 23, 2010	May 7, 2011
Ash, Iris, and Cilan arrive in Nacrene City and head to the museum, but it is closed. Hawes, the museum's curator, explains that the museum is locked down because it is believed to be haunted. Ash states that he does not believe in ghosts, but Iris states it is possible. After the gang is given a tour, they are led to a sarcophagus and a death mask believing the chain of events are to be linked to the Mask Pokémon, Yamask. As they prepare to camp out inside the museum to discover the truth, Team Rocket meets up with Pierce, who tells them they have to steal a meteorite from the Nacrene Museum.
674	668	15	"The Battle According to Lenora!" (Shippō Gym Battle! Vs. Gym Leader Aloe!!); Transliteration: "Shippō Jimu Ikusa! Tai Jimu Rīdā Aroe!!" (Japanese: シッポウジム戦！VSジムリーダー・アロエ！！)	January 6, 2011	May 14, 2011
After being given a short tour of the Nacrene City Museum, Lenora accepts Ash's challenge. Lenora eventually defeats Ash, who feels dejected until Don George tells him not to give up so easily, promising to teach Ash's Pokémon a new move. Meanwhile, Team Rocket infiltrates the museum and steals the meteorite, replacing it with the fake one they received earlier.
675	669	16	"Rematch at the Nacrene Gym!" (Shippō Gym Rematch! The Explosive New Moves!!); Transliteration: "Saisen Shippō Jimu! Shin Waza Sakuretsu!!" (Japanese: 再戦シッポウジム！新技炸裂！！)	January 13, 2011	May 21, 2011
Ash trains with Tepig and Oshawott at the Nacrene City's Pokémon Battle Club and trying to teach them more powerful moves. After successfully teaching Tepig Flame Charge and Oshawott Aqua Jet, he challenges Lenora for the Basic Badge once more, only to find out Lenora's Lillipup has evolved into a Herdier. Ash sends out Tepig against Herdier once more, and he is able to hold his own against the powerful Pokémon until Herdier uses Roar to force Oshawott out again. Just like before, Lenora switches to Watchog and traps Oshawott with Mean Look. Oshawott uses Aqua Jet against Watchog, but misses, and is then struck by Confuse Ray. Confused, Oshawott is unable to attack and Watchog uses Thunderbolt, but Oshawott is now able to withstand the attack. He uses Aqua Jet again as Watchog uses Thunderbolt once more, knocking out both of them. Lenora sends out Herdier again and Ash sends out Tepig as before. With the Battle Club training, Tepig is able to dodge Herdier's Shadow Ball attacks, until Lenora commands Herdier to use Giga Impact. Ash has Tepig use his Flame Charge, and after the two attacks collide, Tepig is the only one standing, winning the match. Lenora awards Ash the Basic Badge for defeating her, and after Ash heads to the Pokémon Center, he learns that the next Gym is in Castelia City.
676	670	17	"Scraggy–Hatched to Be Wild!" (The Wild Child That Hatched From the Egg!); Transliteration: "Tamago kara Kaetta Abarenbō!" (Japanese: タマゴからかえったあばれん坊！)	January 20, 2011	May 28, 2011
While on the way to Castelia City, Ash, Iris, and Cilan are resting for a while when Axew notifies the others that the Pokémon Egg Ash got earlier is about to hatch. They remove it from the container and Iris tells Axew that he will "soon be a big brother". In his excitement, Axew accidentally knocks the egg down a hill, but Pikachu catches it before it hits a rock. It soon hatches into the Molting Pokémon, Scraggy, and it Leers at Pikachu before trying a Headbutt and misses. Ash decides to help train Scraggy by having it fight his other Pokémon, but Scraggy keeps being rude and failing at various attacks against Ash's Pokémon, causing it to lose confidence. Elsewhere, Pierce directs Team Rocket to bring the meteorite they stole to a lab for study.
677	671	18	"Sewaddle and Burgh in Pinwheel Forest!" (Yaguruma Forest! Kurumiru and Arti!!); Transliteration: "Yaguruma no Mori! Kurumiru to Āti!!" (Japanese: ヤグルマの森！クルミルとアーティ！！)	January 27, 2011	June 4, 2011
Ash, Iris, and Cilan enter the Pinwheel Forest, where Pikachu is attacked by a wild Sewaddle, the Sewing Pokémon. Ash decides to capture it, but it surrounds him with a String Shot attack and escapes. Deeper in the forest, the group comes across a large tree where they believe the Sewaddle is hiding. They climb up it and find a giant cocoon, only for it to be revealed to be Burgh, Castelia City's Gym Leader, who is in the forest to sketch some of the wildlife. As he shows the group his drawings, the Sewaddle attacks Ash again, only to nuzzle up to Burgh. It seems that Sewaddle likes everyone in the group except Ash. However, after Ash saves Sewaddle from a group of Woobat, Sewaddle begins to warm up to him. The next day, Sewaddle is abducted by a Patrat, which reveals to the group that another Patrat has fallen ill, before Sewaddle attaches itself to a Deerling and falls in a ravine towards a waterfall. Ash dives in after it to save it, and is then saved by Burgh's Leavanny, Sewaddle's final form. Happy for being saved, Sewaddle allows Ash to capture it (with Ash transferring one of his Pokémon back to Professor Juniper so Sewaddle can stay with him), and later the group parts ways with Burgh, who tells Ash he will be waiting for him in Castelia City.
678	672	19	"A Connoisseur's Revenge!" (Sommelier Showdown! Ishizumai vs. Futachimaru!!); Transliteration: "Somurie Taiketsu! Ishizumai Tai Futachimaru!!" (Japanese: ソムリエ対決！イシズマイVSフタチマル！！)	February 17, 2011	June 11, 2011
On the way to Castelia City, Ash, Iris, and Cilan visit a mall where Ash finds that another Pokémon Connoisseur is testing the bond between Trainers and their Pokémon. Ash goes to see the Connoisseur, a woman named Burgundy, who claims that none of the Pokémon Ash has caught in Unova are compatible with him. When Cilan arrives to check on Ash, Burgundy recognizes him and becomes enraged, saying that when she brought her Oshawott to Cilan years ago he claimed that she and the Pokémon were not compatible. She also shows that she won the Trio Badge from Cilan's brothers, and challenges Cilan to a battle to fulfill its requirements. She first sends out her Dewott against Cilan's Dwebble, and Dwebble wins. She sends out a Sawsbuck next and Cilan sends out Pansage. In a fierce match, Pansage wins against the Season Pokémon. Burgundy proclaims that one day she will be better than Cilan.
679	673	20	"Dancing with the Ducklett Trio!" (Pikachu vs. Meguroco vs. Koaruhie!!); Transliteration: "Pikachū Tai Meguroko Tai Koaruhī!!" (Japanese: ピカチュウVSメグロコVSコアルヒー！！)	February 24, 2011	June 18, 2011
After a short practice match between Scraggy and Axew, Cilan calls everyone for lunch, but Ash falls down a giant hole dug by the Sandile from the hot springs. Ash finds out that it wants to battle Pikachu, during which it evolves into a Krokorok, but Pikachu's newly learned move, Electro Ball, sends it flying off.
680	674	21	"The Lost World of Gothitelle!" (Skyarrow Bridge and Gothiruselle!); Transliteration: "Sukai Arō Burijji to Gochiruzeru!" (Japanese: スカイアローブリッジとゴチルゼル！)	March 3, 2011	June 25, 2011
Ash, Iris, and Cilan finally arrive at the Skyarrow Bridge, which is enshrouded in a thick fog. Before crossing it, they come across a woman looking at photos of a ferry crossing in the Pokémon Center. They prepare to cross the bridge when they are attacked by a Gothitelle. Ash sends out Snivy, but she cannot defeat the stronger Pokémon, and they are all sent back to the other side. There, they meet a young girl named Sally, who invites them to take her father's ferry to the other side. Cilan notices Gothitelle on board and when the ferry docks again, the group realizes that they are back where they started and that Gothitelle is creating illusions to make them think that the ferry and the little girl exist. When Iris spots Gothitelle again, they chase it onto the Bridge, where it attacks them. Ash sends out Snivy until the woman from before arrives, revealing that she is Sally and that the Gothitelle that they have met helped out her father's ferry business until the bridge was opened. Sally apologizes for leaving Gothitelle behind, and as the fog disappates, Gothitelle disappears. Ash, Iris, and Cilan say their goodbyes to Sally as they head off towards Castellia City.
681	675	22	"A Venipede Stampede!" (Hiun City! Fushide Panic!!); Transliteration: "Hiun Shiti! Fushide Panikku!" (Japanese: ヒウンシティ！フシデパニック！！)	March 10, 2011	July 2, 2011
Ash, Iris, and Cilan finally arrive in Castelia City and meet Burgh, but they all discover that the city has shut itself down. When they investigate the sewers, they discover and assist a Venipede stuck in a pipe, which, out of fear, poisons Ash. Later, they see a whole swarm of Venipede in the sewers and streets, in which Professor Juniper discovers that the Venipede swarm must have been pushed out of their natural habitat by something. The rest of the group uses their Pokémon to gather the Venipede into Central Plaza to keep the townspeople and the Venipede safe, during which Ash's Pidove evolves into a Tranquil, while Professor Juniper discovers that something is emitting energy in the Desert Resort just as Giovanni heads there to join up with Team Rocket.
N/A	N/A	N/A	"Team Rocket vs. Team Plasma! (Part 1)"; Transliteration: "Roketto-dan Tai Purazuma-dan! (Zenpen)" (Japanese: ロケット団VSプラズマ団！（前編）)	N/A (Note: Due to the 2011 earthquake and tsunami, the broadcasts of these episodes have been indefinitely postponed in Japan and the United States. The episodes were supposed to air on March 17 and 24, 2011, respectively, in Japan.)	N/A
Ash and the gang travel into the Desert Resort to discover more about the energy flow that made the Venipede swarm migrate to Castelia City.
N/A	N/A	N/A	"Team Rocket vs. Team Plasma! (Part 2)"; Transliteration: "Roketto-dan Tai Purazuma-dan! (Kōhen)" (Japanese: ロケット団VSプラズマ団！（後編）)	N/A	N/A
Team Rocket and Team Plasma continue to fight over the Meteonite (メテオナイト, Meteonaito), as it releases unstable energies.
682	676	23	"Battling for the Love of Bug-Types!" (Hiun Gym Battle! The Pure-of-Heart Bug Pokémon Battle!); Transliteration: "Hiun Jimu Sen! Junjō Hāto no Mushi Pokemon Batoru!!" (Japanese: ヒウンジム戦！純情ハートの虫ポケモンバトル！！)	March 17, 2011	July 9, 2011
Ash and the gang head back to Castelia City and meet up with Burgh in the Gym for Ash's challenge to earn the Insect Badge. Elsewhere, Jessie, James, and Meowth receive orders that the mission is over and they change into their original white outfits, and James captures a nearby Yamask.
683	677	24	"Emolga the Irresistible!" (Beware Cute Faces! Paralyzing Emonga!!); Transliteration: "Kawaii Kao ni Yōchūi! Emonga de Shibirebire!!" (Japanese: かわいい顔に要注意！エモンガでシビレビレ！！)	March 24, 2011	July 16, 2011
Traveling with Bianca to Nimbasa City, the group comes across a wild Emolga, who, unknown to them, recently tricked a group of male Patrat into giving it apples. It quickly befriends Iris's Axew, as Iris is carrying several apples for the group. Bianca falls in love with the Emolga, but Emolga does not return the affection. She tries to capture Emolga by sending out her Minccino, but Emolga uses Discharge (which hits everyone) and Attract which misses Bianca's Minccino and instead hits Ash's Oshawott. Intent on catching Emolga, Bianca asks everyone to help find it once it escapes. Iris eventually finds Emolga, who does not want to be Bianca's Pokémon. But when Bianca sends out Minccino to fight it, again, it escapes with Axew hanging on as they nearly fall down a cliff into a group of sleeping Swoobat. Emolga manages to save Iris and Axew from the Swoobat as elsewhere Bianca, Ash, and Cilan come across a Scolipede and Galvantula that Bianca angers with her Pignite and Minccino. While cornered by the Swoobat, again, Emolga uses Attract to distract them as Bianca, Ash, and Cilan catch up to save them. Later, Emolga returns to the campsite to glide into Iris's arms, deciding that it wants to be one of Iris's Pokémon.
684	678	25	"Emolga and the New Volt Switch!" (Emonga vs. Tsutarja! Volt Change Chaos!!); Transliteration: "Emonga Tai Tsutāja! Boruto Chenji de Daikonran!!" (Japanese: エモンガVSツタージャ！ボルトチェンジで大混乱！！)	March 31, 2011	July 23, 2011
As Ash and friends continue on their journey, Bianca asks Iris for a practice match against Emolga.
685	679	26	"Scare at the Litwick Mansion!" (The Scary Story of the Hitomoshi Mansion!); Transliteration: "Hitomoshi Yashiki no Kowa~i Ohanashi!" (Japanese: ヒトモシ屋敷のこわ～いお話！)	April 7, 2011	July 30, 2011
While on the way to Nimbasa City, the gang rushes into the woods until they come across a large mansion. They enter the mansion, only to discover it is a trap by Team Rocket.
686	680	27	"The Dragon Master's Path!" (The Road to Becoming a Dragon Master! Kibago vs. Crimgan!!); Transliteration: "Doragon Masutā e no Michi! Kibago Tai Kurimugan!!" (Japanese: ドラゴンマスターへの道！キバゴVSクリムガン！！)	April 14, 2011	August 6, 2011
After a practice match between Scraggy and Axew, Iris spots a Druddigon after it attacks them. Ash sends Pikachu to battle it, thinking it is wild, until its trainer, Emmy arrives. She is not sure why Druddigon is upset until Iris realizes it has a metal rope around its ankle. Iris frees Druddigon, making it happier, and Emmy asks Iris to help train her Druddigon. Iris, who plans on becoming a Dragon Master, agrees to help. Emmy and Ash have a match while Team Rocket, who has been watching and had previously tried to capture Druddigon, distracts the trainers before snatching Pikachu, Axew, and Druddigon up into their new airship.
687	681	28	"Oshawott's Lost Scalchop!" (The Lost Hotachi! Mijumaru's Greatest Crisis!!); Transliteration: "Kieta Hotachi! Mijumaru Saidai no Kiki!!" (Japanese: 消えたホタチ！ミジュマル最大の危機！！)	April 21, 2011	August 13, 2011
On the road to Nimbasa City, Ash and Co. come across a trainer named Stephan who challenges Ash to a battle. Stephan sends out his Blitzle while Ash sends out Oshawott, who blocks Blitzle's attack with his Scalchop shell, only to lose it mid-battle. Oshawott runs off to try to find it, ending the battle prematurely.
688	682	29	"Cottonee in Love!" (The Monmen in Love Rides the Wind!); Transliteration: "Koisuru Monmen wa Kaze ni Notte!" (Japanese: 恋するモンメンは風に乗って！)	April 28, 2011	August 20, 2011
In a practice match between Scraggy and Axew, the match is interrupted by a gust of wind followed by the appearance of a Cottonee. Cilan realizes that it is the time of year when Cottonee pair up and that this male Cottonee must be looking for a mate.
689	683	30	"A UFO for Elgyem!" (Ligray and the Unidentified Flying Object!); Transliteration: "Rigurē to Mikakunin Hikō Buttai!" (Japanese: リグレーと未確認飛行物体！)	May 5, 2011	August 27, 2011
While Ash, Iris, Cilan, Pikachu, and Axew are suddenly woken up by a bright light. Ash and Iris believe it is a UFO, and rumors of UFO sightings begin to spread in the area.
690	684	31	"Ash and Trip's Third Battle!" (Rival Battle! Vanipeti and Dokkorā in the Fight!!); Transliteration: "Raibaru Batoru! Baniputchi, Dokkorā Sansen!!" (Japanese: ライバルバトル！バニプッチ、ドッコラー参戦！！)	May 12, 2011	September 3, 2011
Cilan prepares lunch for the gang until Iris and Ash accidentally ruin his cooking by getting a leaf inside. He knocks over the pot in his anger, and regrets it instantly. While they wait, Iris and Ash explore the surrounding forest where they accidentally come across Trip trying to catch a wild Palpitoad, which Ash interferes with.
691	685	32	"Facing Fear with Eyes Wide Open!" (Gamagaru, Maggyo! Battle at the Waterside!!); Transliteration: "Gamagaru, Maggyo! Mizube no Tatakai!!" (Japanese: ガマガル、マッギョ！水辺の戦い！！)	May 19, 2011	September 10, 2011
Ash decides to do some special training with Oshawott to get him to open his eyes underwater, but things get out of hand when Ash tries to force Oshawott to obey. As Ash and Oshawott are doing some special training, the other pokémon get poisoned by multiple Foongus.
692	686	33	"Iris and Excadrill Against the Dragon Buster!" (The Dragon Buster Appears! Iris and Doryuzu!!); Transliteration: "Doragon Basutā Tōjō! Airisu to Doryūzu!!" (Japanese: ドラゴンバスター登場！アイリスとドリュウズ！！)	May 26, 2011	September 17, 2011
While on the way to Nimbasa City, the group comes across a trainer named Georgia who claims that she is a Dragon Buster and can beat any Dragon-type Pokémon. Iris challenges her, saying that she is training to be a Dragon Master, but finds trouble when she hurts her Excadrill's feelings
693	687	34	"Gotta Catch a Roggenrola!" (Dangoro! Fire the Luster Cannon!!); Transliteration: "Dangoro! Rasutā Kanon Hassha seyo!" (Japanese: ダンゴロ！ラスターカノン発射せよ！！)	June 2, 2011	September 24, 2011
While the gang enjoys lunch, they are interrupted by a Roggenrola landing on their lunch table. Ash decides he wants to capture it for the energy and spunk it has.
694	688	35	"Where Did You Go, Audino?" (Sommelier Detective Dent! The Case of the Missing Tabunne!!); Transliteration: "Somurie Tantei Dento! Tabunne Shissō Jiken!!" (Japanese: ソムリエ探偵デント！タブンネ失踪事件！！)	June 9, 2011	October 1, 2011
On the way to Nimbasa City, Ash and the gang encounter an Audino walking through a thick fog. They realize that something is very wrong with it. They encounter Officer Jenny with two young detectives named Doyle and Christie, who place the gang under arrest, even though they insist that they have not done anything wrong. Finally, Cilan reveals that he is the Gym Leader of the Striaton Gym and explains that a simple phone call will clear things up. After Officer Jenny apologizes to the gang, she explains that something is seriously wrong with the Audino in town, as they are disappearing one after the other.
695	689	36	"Archeops in the Modern World!" (Fossil Revival! Ancient Mysterious Bird Archeops!!); Transliteration: "Kaseki Fukkatsu! Kodai Kaichō Ākeosu!!" (Japanese: 化石復活！古代怪鳥アーケオス！！)	June 16, 2011	October 8, 2011
Ash and the gang visit a research lab to witness Professor Juniper and Professor Fennel revive an ancient Pokémon called Archen. They begin the revival process using Fennel's Musharna which wakes up Archen. However, it is restless and begins to attack everyone. Meanwhile, Team Rocket decide to steal the Archen, along with the data for constructing a restoration machine. As Archen is sleeping, the professors are pondering what having an Archen in this modern world would be like. As it wakes up, it starts to destroy the lab and its crying causes an ancient plant to start growing in the lab.
696	690	37	"A Fishing Connoisseur in a Fishy Competition!" (Fishing Sommelier Dent Appears!!); Transliteration: "Tsuri Somurie Dento Tōjō!!" (Japanese: 釣りソムリエ・デント登場！！)	June 23, 2011 (Note: Due to the 2011 earthquake and tsunami, the broadcast of this episode was postponed from its original April 7, 2011, airdate. The episode was originally titled "Hiun City Fishing Competition! Fishing Sommelier Dent Appears!!" (ヒウンシティのつり大会！釣りソムリエ・デント登場!!, Hiun Shiti no Tsuri Taikai! Tsuri Somurie Dento Tōjō!!), but to fit in with its new airdate, references to the setting of Hiun (Castelia) City were removed.)	October 15, 2011
Continuing their journey to Nimbasa City, Bianca shows a poster announcing a fishing contest for which the prize is a golden fishing rod, which Cilan can't resist entering, unaware that the contest is a trick staged by Team Rocket.
697	691	38	"Movie Time! Zorua in 'The Legend of the Pokémon Knight'!" (Zorua the Movie! The Legend of the Pokémon Knight!); Transliteration: "Zoroa Za Mubi! Pokemon Naito no Densetsu!!" (Japanese: ゾロア・ザ・ムービー！ポケモンナイトの伝説！！)	June 30, 2011	October 22, 2011
Continuing to Nimbasa City, Ash and the gang encounter a Zorua. They are excited to see such a rare Pokémon, only to find that out it belongs to a Pokémon Trainer named Luke, who is filming a movie with Zorua. The gang helps out with production, during which Team Rocket interrupts by capturing Zorua.
698	692	39	"Reunion Battles in Nimbasa!" (Everyone Gathers! Don Battle!!); Transliteration: "Zen'in Shūgō! Don Batoru!!" (Japanese: 全員集合！ドンバトル！！)	July 7, 2011	October 29, 2011
Ash is excited to have his Gym battle, but discovers he is in Nimbasa Town; not Nimbasa City. He decides to enter the battle tournaments held in Nimbasa Town.
699	693	40	"Cilan Versus Trip, Ash Versus Georgia!" (Fierce Fighting Don Battle! Tsutarja vs. Komatana!!); Transliteration: "Nettō Don Batoru! Tsutāja Tai Komatana!!" (Japanese: 熱闘ドンバトル！ツタージャVSコマタナ！！)	July 21, 2011	November 5, 2011
The Club Battle Tournament in Nimbasa Town continues with Cilian winning against Trip in the fifth round, Stephan winning against Bianca in the sixth round, and Luke winning against Scooter in round seven. Iris wins the eighth round against Jimmy Ray, having finished all eight matches of the first round. Trip decides to leave, claiming he will not get stronger by watching Ash lose. The next day, Ash battles Georgia in the first match of the second round, sending out Snivy while Georgia sends out Pawniard.
700	694	41	"The Club Battle Hearts of Fury: Emolga Versus Sawk!" (White Hot Don Battle! Emonga vs. Dageki!!); Transliteration: "Hakunetsu Don Batoru! Emonga Tai Dageki!!" (Japanese: 白熱ドンバトル！エモンガVSダゲキ！！)	August 4, 2011	November 12, 2011
The second round of the Club Battles at Nimbasa Town continue as Georgia orders Pawniard to use Guillotine on a fallen Snivy. Snivy manages to gain consciousness at the last second and dodge the attack once again and attacks using Leaf Blade and Leaf Storm, defeating Pawniard and giving Ash the win of the first match. Georgia and Iris have another verbal brawl. In the second match, Dino wins against Antonio. In the third match, Cilan sends out Stunfisk against Luke's Larvesta, who ultimately wins the third match. The final match of the second round is Iris vs. Stephan, who sends out his Sawk, which is male, while Iris sends out her Emolga. Emolga starts off with Attract while Sawk counters with Close Combat. Sawk then uses Bulk Up while Emolga uses Hidden Power which is countered by Double Kick. Emolga uses Hidden Power again which makes a direct hit. Sawk uses Close Combat but gets paralyzed by Emolga's Static ability. Emolga finishes with Volt Switch taking out Sawk and giving Iris the win thus concluding the second round. The semi-finals will soon begin with Ash facing Dino and Iris facing Luke.
701	695	42	"The Club Battle Finale: A Heroes Outcome!" (Deciding Match of the Don Battle! Satoshi Against Iris!!); Transliteration: "Kessen Don Batoru! Satoshi Tai Airisu!!" (Japanese: 決戦ドンバトル！サトシ対アイリス！！)	August 11, 2011	November 19, 2011
Ash sends out Palpitoad while Dino sends out Darumaka in the first match of the semi-finals, and Ash wins. The last match of the semi-finals is Luke against Iris. Luke calls out Golett while Iris chooses Axew. Iris starts off with Scratch but it has no effect. Golett uses Mega Punch and lands a direct hit. After Golett gains the upper hand, Axew falls from exhaustion, during which he manages to learn Outrage, allowing Axew to attack Golett, knocking it out and securing the win for Iris, but leaves Axew confused. In the final battle, Ash chooses Pikachu while Iris uses Excadrill. Pikachu starts off with a Thunderbolt, which is useless against Excadrill, who responds with Drill Run and Pikachu counters with Quick Attack. Excadrill dodges, quickly grabs Pikachu's tail, throws him, and uses Metal Claw, landing a direct hit. The two sides use steel attacks that don't seem to land any effect, until Excadrill uses Dig and Pikachu dodges, only to be hit by Excadrill's Focus Blast which knocks Pikachu out and secures Iris the win of the Club Battles.
702	696	43	"Meowth's Scrafty Tactics!" (Meowgotiator Nyarth! Zuruzukin Persuasion Tactics!!); Transliteration: "Nyagoshiētā Nyāsu! Zuruzukin Setoku Sakusen!!" (Japanese: ニャゴシエーター・ニャース！ズルズキン説得作戦！！)	August 18, 2011	November 26, 2011
Stopping on their way to Nimbasa City for a lunch break, Axew and Tepig discover Team Rocket's Meowth unconscious in the bushes. The gang revive him back to health. When he wakes up, he explains that Team Rocket has fired him for botching an operation. They decide to take Meowth along for a while, but Pikachu is still suspicious of him. Shortly after, a Scrafty snatches Axew and runs off. They give chase but Scrafty threatens that if they get closer, bad things will happen to Axew. Meowth offers to negotiate the problem. Scrafty wants a Pokémon to battle him. They decide to distract Scrafty using Meowth and Scraggy while the gang secretly pull Axew out, and learn that the Scrafty's home was taken by a wild Mandibuzz and that it asked for help from other Pokémon but they all refused, which is why Scrafty snatched Axew.
703	697	44	"Purrloin, Sweet or Sneaky?" (Beware of Choroneko! Nyarth and Mijumaru!!); Transliteration: "Choroneko ni Goyōjin! Nyāsu to Mijumaru!!" (Japanese: チョロネコに御用心！ニャースとミジュマル！！)	August 25, 2011	December 3, 2011
A Purrloin decides to aggravate a Tranquill by eating its food, but soon a flock of Transquill causes it to run away with them giving chase. As Ash and the gang continue their journey, they encounter that Purrloin. Meowth and Oshawott immediately fall for Purrloin, assuming that it is a female.
704	698	45	"Beheeyem, Duosion, and the Dream Thief!" (Ōbemu, Daburan, and the Dream Thief!); Transliteration: "Ōbemu to Daburan to Yume Dorobō!" (Japanese: オーベムとダブランと夢泥棒！)	September 1, 2011	December 10, 2011
Ash and the gang stop to have dinner, during which a very strange person proclaims that he is going to capture Meowth.
705	699	46	"The Beartic Mountain Feud!" (Meowgotiator Nyarth! Breaking Through Tunbear's Forest!!); Transliteration: "Nyagoshiētā Nyāsu! Tsunbeā no Mori o Toppa seyo!!" (Japanese: ニャゴシエーター・ニャース！ツンベアーの森を突破せよ！！)	September 8, 2011	December 17, 2011
Ash and friends continue their journey when they come across a sick Cubchoo, realizing how badly damaged the forest is. They come across a swarm of angry Beartic that starts to attack. Meowth decides to play negotiator and the Beartic use Icy Wind on him. When they want to attack again, a Mienfoo appears and knocks them out. A Forest Ranger named Cliff introduces himself, and is quite amazed at Meowth for his capability of speech. The Cubchoo explains to Meowth exactly what happened before they found it, and Cliff tells them that there are two tribes of Beartic living on the mountain. Cliff asks if Meowth belongs to anybody. When everyone says no, he throws a Poké Ball at him and nearly captures him, much to Meowth's chagrin. They set out to find the Beartic that the Cubchoo belongs to until they are attacked by the Beartic, and Meowth is hit. They run away but fall off of a cliff and get separated from their Pokémon. At the subway station, the Subway Masters are investigating what is going on in the Subway. The Pokémon set out to find food for Axew and Cubchoo, while the gang is searching for them. Meanwhile, Meowth is arguing with the Beartic about the stolen food and he returns them to the Beartic, before getting hit by another Icy Wind. Suddenly, the two Beartic groups meet and they begin to fight each other, firing Sheer Cold attacks at each other, but their fighting causes four boulders to roll down the mountain at them. Three of the four are destroyed by the gang's Pokémon, while the Beartic all use Sheer Cold to freeze the remaining one in place. The two Beartic groups now get along with each other. After departing from Cliff, the gang continues their journey to Nimbasa City. Meanwhile, Team Rocket is preparing their final stage of their mission in Nimbasa City.
706	700	47	"Crisis from the Underground Up!" (Wild Run! Battle Subway!! (Part 1)); Transliteration: "Gekisō! Batoru Sabuwei!! (Zenpen)" (Japanese: 激走！バトルサブウェイ!! （前編）)	September 15, 2011	December 31, 2011
Meowth is revealed to have been working with Team Rocket the entire time; he enters a phone booth to call Team Rocket to give them the go-ahead to attack while the gang rests.
707	701	48	"Battle for the Underground!" (Wild Run! Battle Subway!! (Part 2)); Transliteration: "Gekisō! Batoru Sabuwei!! (Kōhen)" (Japanese: 激走！バトルサブウェイ!! （後編）)	September 15, 2011	January 7, 2012
With Team Rocket having hacked into the subway system's computers, the Subway Masters cannot help but to watch as Team Rocket keeps on releasing fake trains as distractions. Ash suggests inspecting them one by one until they find the right one. Meanwhile, Dr. Zager is planning on rendezvousing with Jessie and James at a designated location. Cilan suggests that Team Rocket is planning to meet outside of the subway and that they are on their way to the Anville Town rail yard. Meanwhile, Pikachu begins to call out other Pokémon to break out of the train. The Subway Masters rendezvous with the gang and plan to drive out of the underground subway station to catch up to Team Rocket, just as the Pokémon have finally cut a hole through the door of the train. Meowth goes to check up on the Pokémon only to see that Pikachu has broken free. Pikachu realizes that Meowth has been lying all along and gets infuriated. The Pokémon work together to destroy the coupling of the train to separate themselves from Team Rocket, forcing them to chase after the train car. When Ash and the others arrive, they see that Dr. Zager is preparing to lift the train car holding the Pokémon with a helicopter and take it away. Ash decides to go over to the train car and help them out. Using a Chandelure's psychic powers, he is transported over to the train car. They outrace Team Rocket until they manage to destroy the clamps on the helicopter. Jessie and James take over the capturing process and begin to speed up. They, again, use the Pokémon to speed up the trailer when Ash's Tepig learns Flamethrower. They attack the train and the path starts to short circuit. Pikachu, still infuriated at Meowth for lying, watches Team Rocket fly away on jetpacks and is about to pursue them (mainly Meowth), but, not before thanking Meowth for traveling with them, Ash manages to calm Pikachu down telling him to let it go for now, while the train destroys itself, as they safely arrive in Anville Town's rail yard. The Subway Masters inform everyone that the Poké Balls will be safely returned to everyone. Ash becomes excited for his gym battle and cannot wait to return to Nimbasa City.

== Music ==
The Japanese opening song is "Best Wishes!" (ベストウイッシュ!, Besuto Uisshu!) by Rica Matsumoto. The first 2 episodes in Japan did not have the ending song, instead, the instrumental songs from Pokémon: Black & White Japanese Anime Sound Collection serve as ending songs during the original broadcast. The ending songs are "Fanfare of the Heart" (心のファンファーレ, Kokoro no Fanfāre) by Aki Okui starting in episode 3 during the original broadcast, and starting in episode 1 on DVD, "Can You Name All the Pokémon? BW" (ポケモン言えるかな? BW ビーダブリュー, Pokémon Ierukana? BW) by Takeshi Tsuruno, and the English opening song is "Black and White" by Erin Bowman and Joe Philips. Its instrumental version serves as the ending theme.

== Home media releases ==
Viz Media and Warner Home Video have released the series on DVD in the United States on four two-disc volume sets that contain 12 episodes each.

The first volume was released on November 20, 2012, The second was released on January 22, 2013, The third was released on March 19, 2013, and the fourth was released on May 14, 2013.

Viz Media and Warner Home Video released Pokémon: Black & White – The Complete Season on DVD on July 27, 2021.
