= Casa e Cozinha =

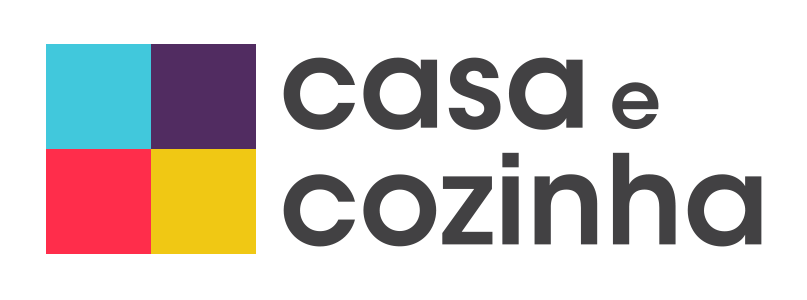
- Country: Portugal
- Broadcast area: Portugal

Programming
- Picture format: 16:9 1080i (HDTV)

Ownership
- Owner: Dreamia

History
- Launched: 8 April 2020

Links
- Website: https://casa-e-cozinha.pt/

Casa e Cozinha is a Portuguese lifestyle television channel owned by Dreamia. The channel broadcasts lifestyle, decoration, and cooking shows. During its first year, the channel was a NOS exclusive.

== History ==
Casa e Cozinha started broadcasting on 8 April 2020. Dreamia justified the launch as derived from the first lockdown, in order to create moments of relaxation among the viewing audience. Already at launch, it had local programs from chef Lúcia Ribeiro and crafter Sofia Pereira, with other Portuguese personalities following in the coming weeks.

The NOS exclusivity was broken on 5 May 2021, with the launch on Vodafone. On 15 July 2022, the channel launched on MEO, days after the premiere of a new local program, Ó da Casa. The amount of original productions had increased in September 2023 to six, using these programs as a "source of inspiration for Portuguese people", tying in with its mid- and long-term strategies.

In November 2024, it started airing Aqui Há Mão, marking the return of Fátima Lopes to television. A second season followed in December 2025.
