= Canal Panda =

Portuguese pay television channel

- Logo used since 6 July 2015
- Broadcast area: Portugal; Angola; Mozambique; Cape Verde
- Headquarters: Lisbon, Portugal

Programming
- Picture format: 1080i HDTV (downscaled to 16:9 576i for the SDTV feed)

Ownership
- Owner: Dreamia (NOS, AMCNI Southern Europe)
- Sister channels: VinTV; Canal Hollywood; AMC; Odisseia; AMC Break; AMC Crime; Casa e Cozinha; Panda Kids

History
- Launched: 1 April 1996; 30 years ago
- Former names: Panda Club (1996–1997)

Links
- Website: canalpanda.pt

Canal Panda is a Portuguese pay television channel. The first network in Portugal dedicated to kids programming. The channel was founded in 1996 as Panda Club in Spain and Portugal, but the name was changed to Canal Panda in 1997. In 2001, the channel was closed down in Spain, thus focusing on the Portuguese market. It was relaunched in Spain in 2011 and closed down again in 2022. Canal Panda is currently operated by Dreamia, a joint-venture between AMC Networks International Iberia and NOS. In addition to the linear channel, it operates the Panda+ SVOD service, developed by the Portuguese technology company Magycal.

Currently, Canal Panda is a Portuguese preschool channel, airing programs targeted at the 3-8 age range, though before the early 2010s it catered a wider demographic.

== History ==
=== Panda Club ===
Canal Panda's origins lie in an hour-long weekday programming block on provincial television stations in China, the block was known as "Panda Club" (熊猫俱乐部) and was produced by DIC Entertainment, ABC's children's division at the time. Panda Club first aired on October 3, 1994, on regional stations in Beijing, Shanghai, Sichuan and Fujian, which are the four largest in China. The programming block offered a five days a week service lasting for one hour per day. Panda Club offered Mandarin dubs of shows from DIC's catalog, such as Madeline, Rimba's Island, Superhuman Samurai Syber-Squad and Adventures of Sonic the Hedgehog. Even before the creation of Panda Club, DIC had an agreement with Hong Ying Animation, producing more than 100 half-hours of content together. John Healy, president of ABC International said that China was a model to establish children's services in other Asian countries. The two partners then created a second Panda Club in India, which aired on the state-run DD Metro channel, with two hours of programming per week, provided by Vijay Amritraj's First Serve Entertainment. To this end, ABC set up offices in New Delhi and Chennai to help create new programming for the country, and to syndicate American shows. A licensing unit was set up in the country in December 1995.

=== Launch in Spain and Portugal ===
In November 1995, United International Holdings (UIH), ABC's parent company - Capital Cities/ABC, cable company Multitel (Spain), and Grupo Urbina bought the Spanish cable broadcaster TPS, to jointly expolit channels for the Spanish and Portuguese markets. TPS already distributed four channels to Spanish cable companies. UIH, Capital Cities/ABC and Urbina all held 30% and Multitel held 10% of the company. Combined, the companies had an investment plan of 4 Billion Spanish pesetas over three years. Panda Club was going to be launched as a standalone channel for both markets. On February 9, 1996, The Walt Disney Company completed its acquisition of ABC/Capital Cities, which included ABC's 30% stake in TPS (with the proposed Panda Club channel in Spain and Portugal), DIC Entertainment and the Panda Club blocks in China and India.

Canal Panda started operations under the name Panda Club on 1 April 1996 on cable operators in Spain and Portugal, broadcasting fully in Spanish for approximately nineteen hours a day. Playout was done from Miami, which shared decisions with the office in Spain.

=== Becoming Canal Panda ===
In October 1996, Multicanal TPS announced a "re-launch" of its channels and at that point in time, its channel portfolio had 150,000 subscribers in Spain and Portugal. Multicanal TPS also invested 500 million Spanish pesetas into a brand new broadcast center in December 1996. In March 1997 its branding separated itself from the Panda Club blocks in China and India, adopting the current name, Canal Panda. The logo was also changed to a simple, less childish design. The channel also started providing content in Portuguese; the channel started airing content for slightly more mature audiences, with the inclusion of subtitled live-action series. In 1998 it repositioned itself under a new philosophy combining non-violent action, educational content and of a positive character. In 2000, Panda became the official mascot of the channel.

=== Independent Portuguese channel ===
Following the closure of the channel in Spain, in January 2001, due to saturated competition in the Spanish market and difficulties with acquired content in both countries, the channel was aimed exclusively at the Portuguese market, where it had become one of the most successful cable channels.

Less than one year after becoming exclusive to Portugal, the channel started producing national content, that was often shown between shows. In December 2001, the channel premiered Panda Sport (remaining on air until the mid-2000s) as its first national production.

In 2002, the channel's daily average surpassed 10,000 viewers. Much of its success owed to Japanese anime being shown mostly during its primetime slot (20:30 to 21:30). In 2002 and 2004, the most-watched program of the year was an episode of Doraemon shown in the noon slot. On March 17, 2005, it broke the record of 80,000 viewers in the 4-14 demographic with a primetime episode of Monster Rancher.

The channel was refaced on May 28, 2006, for this end, a campaign with a budget of €60,000 was initiated eyeing the summer period. This campaign introduced the new version of the Panda mascot, which was now supplemented by new characters, such as Kinkas (kangaroo), Juba (lion) and Pintas (giraffe). The mascots were introduced to the channel in bumpers with the aim of premiering a Panda Cartoon animated series by the end of the year. The new characters were approved by a study made by Millward Brown Investigation Institute.

In June 2009, its content was made available on demand on ZON's service.

Control of the channel was handed over to Dreamia, a joint-venture between Chello Multicanal and ZON, which also oversaw the creation of Panda Biggs, a channel aimed at older kids. This solidified Canal Panda's conversion to a pre-school channel.

On July 6, 2015, Canal Panda rebranded; the reface affected the logo and mascots of the channel, with the mascots switching to 3D support. The new look was designed in Spain by Sopa de Sobre and had the assistance of viewers and fans from both countries, with the aim of creating a uniform identity for both channels.

HD broadcasts started on March 25, 2021, in time for the channel's 25th anniversary. On December 15, 2021, Canal Panda launched its SVOD service Panda+, developed in partnership with Portuguese technology company Magycal, providing children with safe access to age-appropriate content based on the user profile settings.
