= AMC Western =

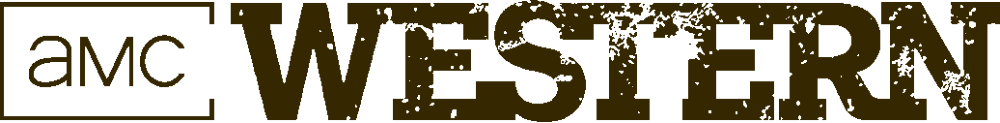
- Country: Spain
- Broadcast area: Spain; Andorra; Gibraltar
- Headquarters: Madrid, Spain

Programming
- Language: Spanish
- Picture format: 1080i HDTV (downscaled to 16:9 576i for the SDTV feed)

Ownership
- Owner: AMC Networks International Southern Europe
- Sister channels: AMC; Canal Cocina; AMC Living; Canal Hollywood; AMC Historia; AMC Odisea; AMC Break; AMC Crime; SundanceTV; Dark; XTRM; Somos; SELEKT; VinTV

History
- Launched: 13 April 2023 (as ¡Buen Viaje!); 10 February 2026 (as AMC Western)
- Former names: Sol Música (1997–2023) ¡Buen Viaje! (2023–2026)

Links
- Website: amcglobalmedia.es

AMC Western is a Spanish pay television channel dedicated exclusively to the Western genre, owned and operated by AMC Networks International Southern Europe (AMCNISE). It launched on 10 February 2026, replacing ¡Buen Viaje!, which launched on 13 April 2023, in turn replacing Sol Música.

== History ==
=== Background ===
The channel position began with Sol Música. On 29 March 2023, AMC Networks announced that it would cease broadcasting on 12 April 2023, to be replaced by a new travel channel, ¡Buen Viaje!.

=== ¡Buen Viaje! (2023–2026) ===
¡Buen Viaje! (stylized as ¡BUEN VIAJE!) was a pay television travel channel launched by AMCNISE on 13 April 2023 at 6:00 a.m., replacing Sol Música on all providers where it was carried. On 1 January 2025, the channel was removed from Movistar+ following a commercial disagreement between Movistar and AMC Networks.

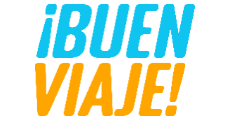
Last ¡Buen Viaje! logo, used from 13 April 2023 to its rebrand as AMC Western on 10 February 2026

=== AMC Western (2026–present) ===
In November 2025, AMC Networks announced that ¡Buen Viaje! would be replaced on 10 February 2026 by a new channel, AMC Western, the only such channel on Spanish pay-TV. The channel inherited ¡Buen Viaje!'s capacity on all operators. Orange TV added the new channel from scratch.

== Programming ==
AMC Western's programming spans the full history of the Western genre from its earliest silent film origins through to contemporary productions. The channel places particular emphasis on the Hollywood golden age of Westerns, Euro-Westerns — including productions filmed in Spain — and more recent titles demonstrating the genre's continuing capacity for reinvention.

At launch, the channel featured the work of directors including John Ford, Sergio Leone, Henry Hathaway, Howard Hawks, Sam Peckinpah, and John Sturges, alongside films starring John Wayne, Clint Eastwood, Henry Fonda, Charlton Heston, Robert Redford, Joan Crawford, and Paul Newman. Contemporary titles at launch included Quentin Tarantino's The Hateful Eight.

=== Programming categories ===
Category	Description
Classic Hollywood Westerns	Films from the golden age of Hollywood, featuring directors such as John Ford, Howard Hawks, Henry Hathaway, and John Sturges
Euro-Westerns	Italian and Spanish-produced Westerns, including the works of Sergio Leone and Sam Peckinpah; notable emphasis on productions filmed on location in Spain
Contemporary Westerns	More recent productions reinterpreting the genre, including titles such as The Hateful Eight (2015)
Western television series	Classic and contemporary Western-themed television series

== Distribution ==
Platform / Operator	Channel Number	Notes
Vodafone TV	—	Available from 10 February 2026
Orange TV	38	Available from 10 February 2026
Jazztel	—	Available from 10 February 2026
Yoigo	—	Available from 10 February 2026
Euskaltel	—	Available from 10 February 2026
DIGI	—	Available from 10 February 2026
MásMóvil	—	Available from 10 February 2026
R Cable	—	Available from 10 February 2026
Avatel	—	Available from 10 February 2026
Telecable	—	Available from 10 February 2026
Pepephone	—	Available from 10 February 2026
Lowi	—	Available from 10 February 2026
PTV Telecom	—	Available from 10 February 2026
Cable Local	—	Available from 10 February 2026
Tivify	—	Available from 10 February 2026
Movistar+	—	¡Buen Viaje! removed 1 January 2025; AMC Western distribution status unconfirmed at time of launch

== See also ==
- ¡Buen Viaje! (predecessor)
- Sol Música (original channel on this dial position)
- AMC Living (rebranded simultaneously on 10 February 2026)
- AMC Networks International Southern Europe
- Western (genre)
- Spaghetti Western
