= Enfamilia =

- Broadcast area: Spain; Andorra

Programming
- Picture format: 1080i HDTV (downscaled to 16:9 576i for the SDTV feed)

Ownership
- Owner: AMC Networks International Southern Europe
- Sister channels: Biggs; Canal Hollywood; AMC; Blaze; Canal Cocina; Crimen + Investigación; Dark; Decasa; Historia; Odisea; Sol Música; Somos; Sundance TV; XTRM

History
- Launched: 15 December 2022
- Closed: 1 July 2025 (2 years, 6 months and 16 days)
- Replaced by: VinTV

Links
- Website: canalpanda.es

Enfamilia was a Spanish pay television channel, owned by AMC Networks. Its output consisted of programming from the company's several outlets, geared towards family viewing.

== History ==
The channel was announced a few days ahead of its 15 December 2022 launch, replacing Canal Panda. The channel was a co-production with Fundación Universitaria San Pablo CEU and consisted of themed blocks dedicated to lifestyle, documentaries, movies and TV series. Canal Panda gained a two-hour morning block (7 to 9am), Panda Enfamilia.

One year after launching, the channel had accumulated an audience of 7,7 million viewers, who had tuned in at least once to the channel. In that period alone, the most watched titles were Northern Exposure, Masha and the Bear and Maestros de la cerámica. By the time of its second anniversary, its audience rose to 11,8 million. On 3 December 2024, ALF premiered on the channel.

On 28 May 2025, AMC Networks announced its shutdown being replaced by VinTV from 1 July. The channel ended with a promo for the new channel during its last commercial break, followed by the channel ident before airing VinTV's test card-based launch waiting screen.
