= Canal Panda (Spain) =

Spanish children's television channel

- Logo used in second incarnation
- Broadcast area: Spain, Andorra

Programming
- Picture format: 1080i HDTV

Ownership
- Owner: AMC Networks International Southern Europe
- Sister channels: Biggs; Canal Hollywood; AMC; Blaze; Canal Cocina; Crimen + Investigación; Dark; Decasa; Historia; Odisea; Sol Música; Somos; Sundance TV; XTRM

History
- Launched: 1996 (as Panda Club); 1 April 2011 (relaunch)
- Closed: 1 January 2001 (original); 15 December 2022 (relaunch)
- Replaced by: Enfamilia
- Former names: Panda Club (April 1996–September 1997)

Links
- Website: canalpanda.es

Canal Panda was a Spanish pay television channel, which was one of the country's first pay television networks dedicated to children's programming, mostly animated series.

== History ==
Canal Panda was the first Portuguese and Spanish channel exclusively dedicated to children and teens. It was broadcast 20 hours a day, without interruptions, and featured a variety of programs such as cartoons, anime, live-action series, children's films and special programs about sports, music and culture.

It was founded in 1995, launched the following year as Panda Club, and rebranded to Canal Panda a year later, on 15 September 1997, for the launch of Via Digital.

Initially it was distributed in Spain, but on 1 January 2001, satellite provider Via Digital removed the channel, citing strong competition in the Spanish market, and it was replaced by Megatrix, with distribution deal with Antena 3. In 2004, Megatrix closed due to the merger between satellite providers Canal Satelite Digital and Via Digital.

On 1 April 2011, Canal Panda was relaunched in Spain due to a decision of Chello Multicanal for reviving the brand and replacing KidsCo which Chello was the Spanish distributor and was not satisfied with the bill. The focus of programming on the channel also shifted towards preschool shows. The relaunch was met with some controversy among the anime community, as its Portuguese counterpart broadcast some anime that were not airing in the Spanish version, but the Spanish version claimed that such titles did not match the channel's content criteria.

On 6 July 2015, the channel was rebranded with a new logo.

On 2 July 2019, Vodafone TV added the channel in HD to its offers.

On 1 June 2021, the channel launched an evening block aimed at older children and teenage audiences called Panda Kids, which aired live-action shows, game shows and reality shows. In Portugal, Panda Kids was initially launched as a pop-up channel, before being placed into its own full channel, focusing on animated programming.

On 15 December 2022, the channel closed for a second time. The channel was replaced by Enfamilia, with a morning block called Panda Enfamilia continuing until the channel was rebranded to VinTV on 1 July 2025.

== Programs ==
=== 1997–2001 ===
- Doraemon
- Don Quijote de La Mancha
- Count Duckula
- Billy the Cat
- Oscar's Orchestra
- Avenger Penguins
- Wishbone
- Mikhail Baryshnikov's Stories from My Childhood
- Tales from the Crypt
- C.L.Y.D.E.
- The Adventures of Blinky Bill
- Dino Babies
- Teenage Mutant Ninja Turtles
- Garfield and Friends
- Dinky Dog
- Crocadoo
- The New Adventures of Robin Hood
- Sharky & George
- Football Stories
- Mr. Bogus
- Buddies
- El loco mundo de Robby y Laly
- Noah's Island
- Baby Follies
- Profunda oscuridad
- Los chicos del mañana
- Bobobobs
- Aventuras en la isla
- The Return of Dogtanian
- Where's Wally?
- Robinson Sucroe
- The Adventures of Max and Molly
- Twinkle, the Dream Being
- Soccer Fever
- Casper the Friendly Ghost
- Papa Beaver's Storytime
- Banana Zoo
- Loggerheads
- Calamity Jane
- Drak Pack
- Widget
- Rubbish, King of the Jumble
- Little Rosey
- The Dreamstone
- Rocky and the Dodos
- Cadillacs and Dinosaurs
- Sooty's Amazing Adventures
- The Treacle People
- The Legends of Treasure Island
- Ovide and the Gang
- Los navegantes
- Salvemos el anfiteatro
- ReBoot
- A Thousand and One... Americas
- Meteoro
- The New World of the Gnomes
- The Little Flying Bears
- Los chicos de Hillshade
- Starla and the Jewel Riders
- Student Bodies
- Percy the Park Keeper
- Sandokan
- Hallo Spencer
- Gente común
- Wolves, Witches and Giants

=== 2011–2022 ===
- Around the World with Willy Fog
- Bernard
- Boom and Reds
- Casper's Scare School
- Canimals
- Captain Biceps
- Code Lyoko
- Connor Undercover
- Corrector Yui
- Cosmic Quantum Ray
- Cyberchase
- Chuggington
- Dex Hamilton: Alien Entomologist
- Dibo the Gift Dragon
- Dogtanian and the Three Muskehounds
- Dork Hunters from Outer Space
- Dragon Hunters
- Evita Percances
- Gormiti
- Hey Duggee
- Huntik: Secrets & Seekers
- Inspector Gadget
- Kiteretsu
- Let's Go Luna!
- Lucky Luke
- Lupin's Tales
- Masha and the Bear
- Memé y el Sr. Bobo
- Monk Little Dog
- Ninja Hattori
- Papawa
- Pet Alien
- Pikwik Pack
- Postman Pat
- Pororo the Little Penguin
- PopPixie
- Scruff
- Sushi Pack
- Street Football
- The Dog and Pony Show
- Topo Gigio
- Van Dogh
- Watch My Chops
- Wild Kratts
- Zip y Zape
- Zorro: Generation Z
