= AMC Living =

- Country: Spain
- Broadcast area: Spain; Andorra; Gibraltar
- Headquarters: Madrid, Spain

Programming
- Language: Spanish
- Picture format: 1080i HDTV (downscaled to 16:9 576i for the SDTV feed)

Ownership
- Owner: AMC Networks International Southern Europe
- Sister channels: AMC; Canal Cocina; Canal Hollywood; AMC Historia; AMC Odisea; AMC Break; AMC Crime; SundanceTV; Sol Música; Dark; XTRM; Somos; SELEKT; AMC Western; VinTV

History
- Launched: 10 February 2026
- Replaced: Canal Decasa
- Former names: Canal Decasa (2007–2026)

Links
- Website: amcglobalmedia.es

AMC Living is a Spanish pay television channel dedicated to lifestyle programming with a focus on home renovation, interior decoration, wellness, beauty, and travel, owned and operated by AMC Networks International Southern Europe (AMCNISE). The channel launched on 10 February 2026 as the successor to Canal Decasa, which had operated since 14 May 2007 as the only pay television channel in Spain specialised entirely in home renovation and decoration content.

AMC Living retains the full original production slate of Canal Decasa while expanding its editorial scope to encompass travel, wellness, and inspirational lifestyle content. Its signature colour is coral, which AMCNISE has described as adding "a warm and expressive note" that reinforces the channel's visual identity and contemporary sensibility.

== History ==
=== Canal Decasa (2007–2026) ===
AMC Living's direct predecessor, Canal Decasa, launched on 14 May 2007 as the first and only pay television channel in Spain dedicated exclusively to home renovation, interior decoration, wellness, beauty, and fashion. It operated under the ownership of Chello Multicanal at launch, which was subsequently acquired by AMC Networks on 2 February 2014 and renamed AMC Networks International Southern Europe on 8 July 2014.

Canal Decasa broadcast continuously for nearly nineteen years, developing a recognised roster of Spanish-language original productions centred on home renovation and decoration. On 1 January 2025, the channel ceased distribution on Movistar+ following a commercial disagreement between Movistar and AMC Networks.

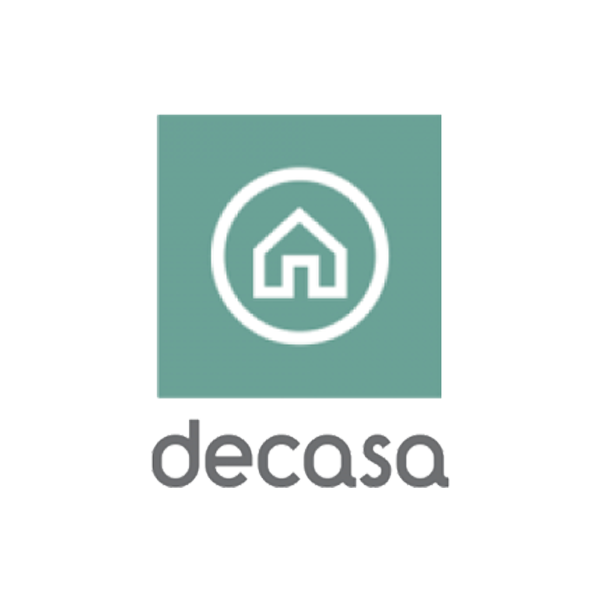
Canal Decasa logo, used from 1 November 2013 to its rebrand as AMC Living on 10 February 2026

=== Launch as AMC Living (2026–present) ===
On 19 January 2026, AMC Networks International Southern Europe announced that Canal Decasa would be rebranded as AMC Living effective 10 February 2026. The rebrand took place on the same date as the rebranding of sister channel ¡Buen Viaje! as AMC Western.

AMC Networks framed the rebrand as a natural evolution rather than a replacement, built on the premise that "home is no longer just a physical space, but a starting point from which we relate to the world: how we travel, how we take care of ourselves, or how we seek inspiration." The channel was described as aspirational and accessible, with a contemporary visual identity aimed at maintaining emotional resonance with its existing audience while attracting a broader viewership demographic.

== Programming ==
AMC Living's programming is built around three editorial pillars: home renovation and decoration, travel and destinations, and wellness and self-care. The channel retains all core original productions from the Canal Decasa era and has introduced new formats across the expanded categories.

Title	Genre	Format	Notes
Reforma Integral	Home renovation	Original production	Flagship renovation series; retained from Canal Decasa era
Minipisos Asombrosos	Interior design	Original production	Focus on compact urban apartments; retained from Canal Decasa era
Redecora con Raquel	Interior decoration	Original production	Hosted by Raquel Regueras; new series premiered February 2026
Busco Piso	Real estate / lifestyle	Original production	Retained from Canal Decasa era
La Cocina de Tus Sueños	Kitchen renovation	Original production	Retained from Canal Decasa era
Hoteles para Mimarte	Travel / wellness	Original production	New format premiering February 2026; tours unique wellness retreats in Spain
Escapadas con Gregg Wallace	Travel	Acquired	European travel format hosted by Gregg Wallace; new to AMC Living

== Identity ==
AMC Living's visual identity was developed as a deliberate departure from the Canal Decasa brand. The channel adopted coral as its signature colour, which AMCNISE described as reflective of the channel's "warm and expressive" personality. The AMC Living wordmark follows the typographic conventions of the wider AMC Networks International Southern Europe master brand system, aligning the channel visually with sister properties including AMC Crime, AMC Break, AMC Historia, and AMC Odisea.

== Distribution ==
Platform / Operator	Notes
Vodafone TV	Ongoing distribution
Orange TV	Ongoing distribution
Telecable	Ongoing distribution
Euskaltel	Ongoing distribution
R Cable	Ongoing distribution
Movistar+	Canal Decasa removed 1 January 2025; AMC Living distribution status unconfirmed at time of launch
Hispasat	Satellite uplink distribution

== See also ==
- Canal Decasa (predecessor)
- AMC Networks International Southern Europe
- Canal Cocina (sister lifestyle channel)
- AMC Western (rebranded simultaneously on 10 February 2026)
