= Dark (Spanish TV channel) =

- Country: Spain
- Broadcast area: Spain; Andorra
- Headquarters: Madrid, Spain

Programming
- Language: Spanish
- Picture format: 1080i HDTV (downscaled to 16:9 576i for the SDTV feed)

Ownership
- Owner: AMC Networks International Southern Europe
- Sister channels: AMC; Canal Cocina; AMC Living; Canal Hollywood; AMC Historia; AMC Odisea; AMC Break; AMC Crime; SundanceTV; Sol Música; XTRM; Somos; SELEKT

History
- Launched: 31 October 2016
- Replaced: Buzz
- Former names: Canal 18 (1997–2013); Buzz Rojo / Canal 18 (2011–2013); Buzz Rojo (2013–2016)

Links
- Website: dark.tv (defunct)

Dark is a Spanish pay television channel dedicated exclusively to horror and suspense programming, owned and operated by AMC Networks International Southern Europe (AMCNISE). Launched on 31 October 2016 — Halloween — Dark is described by its operator as the only channel in Spain devoted entirely to the horror genre in all its forms, encompassing slasher, horror comedy, psychological horror, and anime. The channel replaced the general entertainment network Buzz across the main Spanish pay-television platforms, and traces its lineage to Canal 18, an adult content channel that began broadcasting in September 1997 following the launch of the Vía Digital cable operator.

== History ==
=== Canal 18 (1997–2013) ===
The channel that would ultimately become Dark originated as Canal 18, an adult-oriented pay-television channel that launched in September 1997 following the debut of the Vía Digital cable operator in Spain. Canal 18 specialised primarily in suspense and horror films produced in the United States during the 1980s and 1990s, supplemented by pornographic films broadcast from midnight onward. At the end of 1999, Canal 18 was acquired by Mediapark, under which its programming refocused on horror content while retaining the adult programming bloc at midnight.

On 1 November 2006, following the separation of the contents previously shared with Buzz, the channel operated a split schedule: the Dark brand was used for horror and suspense content broadcast from 9:30 to 00:00, at which point Canal 18 assumed control of the dial for its adult programming bloc running from midnight to 05:00.

Canal 18 logo, used from September 1997 to 1 November 2006

Dark/Canal 18 logo, used from 1 November 2006 to 2 September 2009

=== Buzz Rojo / Canal 18 and Buzz Rojo (2011–2016) ===
On 1 July 2009, Teuve merged the operations of Buzz and the Dark/Canal 18 split schedule, consolidating the brands. On 1 February 2011, Chello Multicanal re-launched the horror-oriented feed under the name Buzz Rojo, which broadcast horror films and series from 09:30 to 00:00, at which point Canal 18 resumed with its adult programming bloc. Buzz Rojo effectively carried on the editorial identity of the original Dark brand from the 2006–2009 period.

On 2 September 2013, Chello Multicanal eliminated Canal 18 following sixteen years of uninterrupted broadcasting, citing legal issues. Canal 18 was replaced on the adult bloc by Dorcel TV, a European erotic television channel founded in 2006. From this point, the channel operated solely under the Buzz Rojo name with a horror and suspense programming identity throughout the day.

Buzz Rojo / Canal 18 logo, used from 1 February 2011 to 2 September 2013, also used from 2 September 2013 to its rebrand as Dark on 31 October 2016

=== Launch as Dark (2016–present) ===
On 31 October 2016 — Halloween — AMC Networks International Southern Europe relaunched the channel under the new brand Dark, positioning it as the first and only pay-television channel in Spain dedicated entirely to the horror genre. The rebranded channel replaced Buzz across the major pay-television platforms, including Movistar+, Vodafone TV, Euskaltel, R, and Telecable, as well as various regional cable networks.

Eduardo Zulueta, president of AMC Networks International Iberia and Latin America, stated at the channel's launch that horror content consumption in Spain had increased by 19% compared to 2015, and that the genre ranked among the most popular with millennial audiences. To mark the Halloween launch, Dark aired a marathon of all ten episodes of the first season of Ash vs. Evil Dead beginning at 18:06:06 — a reference to the Number of the Beast, 666.

== Programming ==
Dark's programming slate spans all major subgenres of horror and suspense, including slasher, horror comedy, psychological horror, and anime with horror themes. The channel carries both acquired Hollywood productions and European horror cinema, with a particular emphasis on content from the 1980s and 1990s alongside contemporary productions.

Notable titles that have aired on Dark include:

Title	Genre	Country of Origin	Notes
Ash vs. Evil Dead	Horror comedy series	United States	Spanish premiere of Season 2 aired on Dark at launch; Season 1 marathon broadcast on 31 October 2016
Eden Lake	Psychological horror film	United Kingdom	Part of launch programming slate
Don't Speak	Horror film	United States	Part of launch programming slate
Wax	Horror film	Spain	Part of launch programming slate
El vengador tóxico (The Toxic Avenger)	Horror comedy film	United States	Part of launch programming slate

== Distribution ==
Platform / Operator	Notes
Movistar+	Available from 31 October 2016
Vodafone TV	Available from 31 October 2016; replaced Buzz
Euskaltel	Available from 31 October 2016; replaced Buzz
R Cable	Available from 31 October 2016; replaced Buzz
Telecable	Available from 31 October 2016; replaced Buzz
Local cable networks	Available from 31 October 2016 across various regional operators

== See also ==
- AMC Networks International Southern Europe
- Buzz (Spanish TV channel) (predecessor)
- XTRM (sister channel)
- AMC Crime (sister channel)
