= Decasa =

Canal Decasa
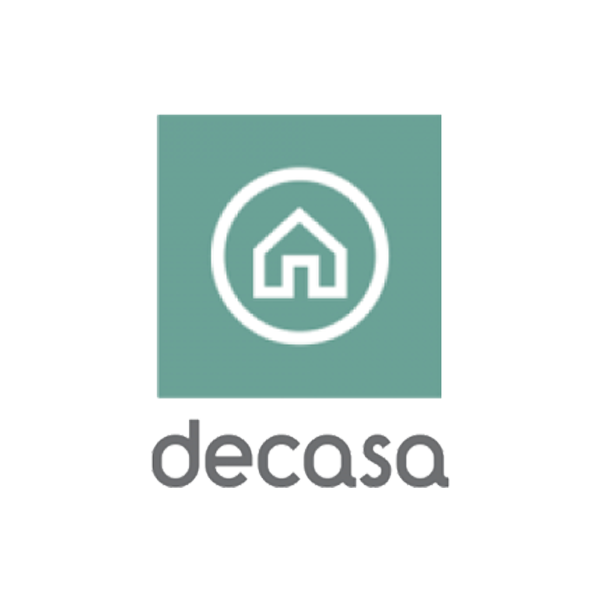
- Country: Spain
- Broadcast area: Spain; Andorra; Gibraltar
- Headquarters: Madrid, Spain

Programming
- Language: Spanish
- Picture format: 1080i HDTV (downscaled to 16:9 576i for the SDTV feed)

Ownership
- Owner: AMC Networks International Southern Europe
- Sister channels: AMC; Canal Cocina; Canal Hollywood; Canal HISTORIA; Odisea; Crimen + Investigación; BLAZE; SundanceTV; Sol Música; Canal Panda; Biggs

History
- Launched: May 1, 2007 (test transmissions); May 14, 2007 (regular broadcast)
- Closed: February 10, 2026
- Replaced by: AMC Living

Links
- Website: decasa.tv (defunct)

Canal Decasa (commonly referred to simply as Decasa) was a Spanish pay lifestyle television channel owned and operated by AMC Networks International Southern Europe, specializing mainly on home decoration, interior renovation, wellness, beauty, and fashion. The channel broadcast continuously from May 14, 2007, until February 10, 2026, when it was replaced by the broader AMC Living.

== History ==
=== Launch and early years (2007–2008) ===
Canal Decasa began test transmissions on May 1, 2007 airing promos for its content. On May 14, 2007, Decasa commenced regular broadcasting via Hispasat, for interested operators; the channel launched on Movistar TV.

On January 1 and January 4, 2008, the channel was added to Digital+ (now Movistar+) and ONO (now Vodafone TV), respectively, alongside The Biography Channel.

=== Expansion across operators (2013) ===
On February 29, 2013, Canal Decasa joined Telecable in Asturias, alongside BBC World News and Bloomberg. Later that year, on October 13, 2013, it would join the Orange TV platform from October 30.

On November 1, 2013, a high-definition feed — Decasa HD — launched, made available on ONO (later Vodafone TV), Telecable, and Orange TV.

The channel continued to air through the late 2010s and early 2020s as one of the flagship lifestyle properties within AMCNISE's Spanish portfolio. The broader AMC Networks International Southern Europe group, which produced and distributed 25 thematic television channels across Spain, Portugal, France, and Italy reaching over 10 million subscribers, categorized Canal Decasa alongside Canal Cocina under its "lifestyle" vertical.

=== Departure from Movistar+ (2024) ===
On December 31, 2024, Canal Decasa ceased broadcasting on Movistar Plus+ due to a commercial disagreement between Movistar and AMC Networks. This was a significant distribution loss, as Movistar+ had been one of the channel's primary carriers since its earliest years of operation.

=== Rebrand as AMC Living (2026) ===
On February 10, 2026, Canal Decasa was officially relaunched as AMC Living, a new lifestyle brand that expanded the channel's editorial scope beyond the home to encompass travel and wellness content, while retaining Decasa's core identity as Spain's only pay television channel exclusively dedicated to home renovation and decoration.

The transition was framed by AMC Networks as a natural evolution of the Decasa brand, built on the premise that "home is no longer just a physical space, but a starting point from which we relate to the world: how we travel, how we take care of ourselves, or how we seek inspiration." The rebranded channel was described as aspirational and accessible, with a contemporary visual identity aimed at maintaining emotional resonance with its existing audience while attracting a broader viewership demographic.

== Programming ==
Canal Decasa's programming slate consisted principally of original Spanish-language productions centered on home renovation, interior decoration, and related lifestyle subjects, supplemented by acquired international content in the same genre. The channel was notable for developing a recognizable roster of Spanish presenter-led formats, many of which continued under the AMC Living banner following the 2026 rebrand.

=== Original productions ===
The channel's flagship original productions included Reforma Integral, Minipisos Asombrosos, Redecora con Raquel, Busco Piso, and La Cocina de Tus Sueños. These programs formed the editorial spine of the channel and were consistently cited in official AMC Networks communications as flagship titles representing Decasa's brand identity.

Redecora con Raquel featured decorator Raquel Regueras transforming real domestic spaces in response to the specific needs and aesthetic ambitions of homeowners. La Cocina de Tus Sueños and its sequel edition La Cocina de Tus Sueños 2.0 focused specifically on kitchen renovations. Minipisos Asombrosos examined the design ingenuity applied to compact urban apartments across Spain. Reforma Integral documented comprehensive whole-home renovations, often involving structural demolition and complete interior redesign.

Additional original programming included Reforma y Sé Feliz, a lighter format in which presenters tackled targeted, budget-conscious home improvements; En-Papel-Arte, hosted by decorating specialist Chus Cano; El Arte de los Artesanos, a documentary series profiling traditional Spanish artisans; and Un Jardín a Tu Medida, a garden design program presented by landscaper Monique Briones, which premiered on Decasa in September 2014.

=== Acquired programming ===
Decasa also carried acquired international lifestyle and renovation content. La Casa de Mis Sueños (Property Brothers), the Canadian format hosted by twins Jonathan and Drew Scott, aired extensively on the channel. Los Gemelos Reforman Dos Veces (also featuring the Scott brothers) was likewise a recurring fixture in the channel's schedule.

=== Programming ===
Title	Genre	Format	Country of Origin	Notes
Reforma Integral	Home renovation	Original production	Spain	Flagship renovation series
Minipisos Asombrosos	Interior design	Original production	Spain	Focus on compact urban apartments
Redecora con Raquel	Interior decoration	Original production	Spain	Hosted by Raquel Regueras
Busco Piso	Real estate / lifestyle	Original production	Spain	Property search format
La Cocina de Tus Sueños	Kitchen renovation	Original production	Spain	Also produced as 2.0 sequel edition
Reforma y Sé Feliz	Home improvement	Original production	Spain	Budget-focused renovation format
En-Papel-Arte	Interior decoration	Original production	Spain	Hosted by Chus Cano
El Arte de los Artesanos	Documentary	Original production	Spain	Profiles of traditional Spanish artisans
Un Jardín a Tu Medida	Gardening / landscaping	Original production	Spain	Hosted by Monique Briones; premiered September 2014
La Casa de Mis Sueños	Home renovation	Acquired (Property Brothers)	Canada	Spanish adaptation/dubbing of Canadian format
Los Gemelos Reforman Dos Veces	Home renovation	Acquired	Canada/US	Scott brothers format

== Distribution ==
At the time of its closure, Canal Decasa was carried by the major Spanish pay-television operators, with channel numbers varying by platform. The following table reflects distribution as documented during the channel's active years:

Platform / Operator	Channel Number	Notes
Movistar+ (Digital+)	—	Carried from January 1, 2008; ceased December 31, 2024
Vodafone TV (formerly ONO)	123	Carried from January 4, 2008
Orange TV	068	Added October 30, 2013
Telecable	068	Added February 29, 2013; HD available
R Cable	059	Carried during active years
Jazztel TV	068	Carried during active years
Euskaltel	039	Carried during active years
Hispasat (satellite)	—	Distribution uplink from launch (May 2007)

== Ownership and corporate context ==
Canal Decasa was produced and distributed by AMC Networks International Southern Europe (AMCNISE), the Southern European division of the American media conglomerate AMC Networks, Inc. AMCNISE operated as one of the largest independent thematic channel producers and distributors in Spain and Portugal, with a portfolio spanning cinema and drama, factual and documentary, lifestyle, music, children's, and general entertainment verticals.

Within the AMCNISE lifestyle vertical, Decasa operated alongside Canal Cocina, Spain's dedicated food and cooking channel, forming the two pillars of the company's non-fiction lifestyle offering in the domestic market. The broader sibling portfolio included AMC, Canal Hollywood, SundanceTV, Canal HISTORIA, Odisea, Crimen + Investigación, BLAZE, XTRM, DARK, Somos, Sol Música, Canal Panda, Biggs, and SELEKT, among others.

== Awards and recognition ==
AMC Networks International Southern Europe received numerous industry recognitions during Canal Decasa's operational period. The broader AMCNISE group was recognized with over 82 Promax awards for creative excellence, was named Best Thematic Channel by the Spanish Academy of Television for five consecutive years, and received six Premio Control awards for Best Television Channel. Canal Decasa, as one of the flagship properties within this portfolio and the group's primary lifestyle brand in Spain, was a consistent contributor to this recognition.

== Succession ==
Canal Decasa was succeeded on February 10, 2026, by AMC Living. The new channel retained all of Decasa's core original productions and expanded into travel and wellness categories, with new formats including Hoteles para Mimarte, a series visiting unique Spanish wellness retreats, and Escapadas con Gregg Wallace, a European travel format. AMC Living was presented by the network as a continuation rather than a replacement, preserving the production team, the presenter pool, and the channel's position within AMCNISE's Spanish distribution agreements.

== See also ==
- AMC Living (successor channel)
- Canal Cocina
- AMC Networks International Southern Europe
- AMC Networks
