= A&E (Spanish and Portuguese TV channel) =

Spanish and Portuguese TV channel

- Country: Spain
- Broadcast area: Spain; Andorra; Portugal; Angola; Mozambique; Cape Verde
- Headquarters: Madrid, Spain

Programming
- Language(s): Spanish; Portuguese
- Picture format: 576i (16:9 SDTV)

Ownership
- Owner: The History Channel Iberia (A&E Networks / AMC Networks International Iberia)
- Sister channels: Historia; Crimen + Investigación

History
- Launched: 2 October 2014
- Closed: 18 April 2018
- Replaced by: Blaze
- Former names: The Biography Channel, Bio.

Links
- Website: aetv.es (Spain) aetv.pt (Portugal)

A&E was a Spanish and Portuguese television channel that carried reality television programming produced by A&E USA, owned by The History Channel Iberia in a joint venture between A&E Networks and AMC Networks International Iberia.

== History ==
The channel launched on October 2, 2014, replacing Bio. and had a Spanish feed available in Spain, and a Portuguese feed available in Portugal and Africa.

On April 18, 2018, it was replaced by the Iberian version of Blaze.
