= VinTV =

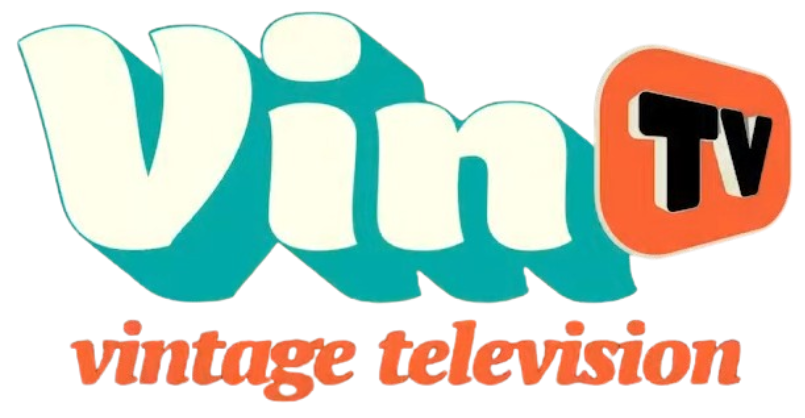
- Country: Spain; Portugal
- Broadcast area: Spain; Andorra; Portugal; Angola; Mozambique; Cape Verde

Programming
- Picture format: 1080i HDTV (downscaled to 16:9 576i for the SDTV feed)

Ownership
- Owner: AMC Networks International Southern Europe
- Sister channels: Canal Hollywood; Casa e Cozinha; AMC; Blaze; Blast; Canal Cocina; Crimen + Investigación; Dark; Decasa; Historia; Odisea; Sol Música; Somos; Sundance TV; XTRM

History
- Founded: 28 May 2025; 17 months ago
- Launched: 1 July 2025; 16 months ago (Spain); 4 May 2026; 6 months ago (Portugal)
- Replaced: Enfamilia (Spain); Biggs (Portugal)

Links
- Website: amcchannels.es/vintv (Spain) vintv.pt (Portugal)

VinTV (Vintage Television) is an Iberian pay television channel, owned by AMC Networks. The channel airs classic television series and films.

== History ==
VinTV was announced by AMC Networks on 28 May 2025, replacing Enfamilia, with the channel launching on 1 July. The channel acquired several of Enfamilia's classic television programming. Initial programming included American television series such as Twin Peaks, The Golden Girls, Ally McBeal, Miami Vice, V, anime series Captain Tsubasa and licensed TVE series Verano azul and El hombre y la Tierra. The channel's presentation announcement was made at Madrid's Teatro Barceló, with the participation of actress and singer Vonda Shepard.

A Portuguese version launched on 4 May 2026, replacing Biggs, and acquired most of the programming from the original Spanish channel, with two shows that formerly aired on Biggs remaining, Morangos com Açúcar and Massa Fresca.

Starting in September 2026, VinTV Portugal plans to air more shows such as The Fresh Prince of Bel-Air as well as licensed RTP titles such as Duarte e Companhia and Herman Enciclopédia. The core foreign programming output is renewed in windows of 18 to 24 months based on the rights they have and on market reaction.
