= The Third Reich in Colour =

Documentary series

The Third Reich in Colour is a documentary series produced by Spiegel TV and shown in English on the History Channel in the UK.

The series consists of narrated clips of rare colour film stock, including images of concentration camp prisoners and Jewish occupants of the ghettos in German-occupied Poland.
