= Blaze TV =

Blaze TV may refer to:

- Blaze Media, an American TV channel
- Blaze (TV channel), a British TV channel
