= Yoigo =

Spanish mobile network operator

Xfera Móviles, S.A.U.
- Type: Sociedad Anónima
- Traded as: Yoigo
- Industry: Telecommunications
- Founded: 2000; 26 years ago, actual operation started in 2006
- Headquarters: Alcobendas, Madrid, Spain
- Products: Mobile telephony, Internet services, 3G, LTE
- Parent: Grupo MásMóvil
- Website: yoigo.com

Xfera Móviles, S.A.U., d/b/a Yoigo, is a Spanish telecommunications company in Spain and a subsidiary of the Spanish telecommunications company Orange España

Although it commercially launched in December 2006, the company was founded in 2000, and had a turbulent start. From its creation, it was owned primarily by TeliaSonera (now Telia Company), and since 21 June 2016 is now the sole property of Grupo MásMóvil, after the CNMC (regulator agency like Federal Communications Commission in Spain) authorised the purchase of 100% of its share capital.

== History ==
Originally the carrier was to be called Xfera, a name reflected in its currently registered name of Xfera Móviles, SA. It was formed in 2001 as a consortium to compete for a new UMTS licence in Spain, which it finally won. At the time, its main shareholders were the French company Vivendi, the Spanish construction company Grupo ACS and Scandinavian cell phone carrier Sonera (now Telia Company).

== Logo gallery ==

After several technology and market problems in 2001, in common with the general launch delay suffered by UMTS technology throughout Europe, the company was at a standstill for several years. Its only operations during that time were the creation of its brand image, trying to achieve an agreement with an existing network operator to act as a backup for their newly created 3G network, and the setting up of a number of base stations so as to not lose their UMTS licence, which required them to maintain an active service prior to a qualifying date.

As of June 2003 most of its investors were complaining about the huge amount of money they had lost in the yet-to-be-launched project, and in summer 2003 Vivendi —which faced problems of its own at that time— eventually left the group by selling its shares to the rest of the shareholders at the symbolic price of 1 €.

In December 2003, with the backing of the remaining shareholders, the board of directors decided to make an additional investment of €135 million, and opened negotiations with Amena (now Orange España) and Vodafone Spain, in the hope of using a third party network as backup coverage while Xfera's own network was built. Further increasing operating costs, for legal reasons the company was obliged to keep a number of base stations operating from 2003 on, despite the fact that the company had no actual users. This was due to the terms of the licence Xfera had been awarded, and failure to comply with such terms would have put Xfera in a poor position to rebuild its network, or even to keep the licence.

The remaining shareholders as of May 2005 were a number of Spanish companies with no previous experience in telecommunications (Grupo ACS at 34.8% of shares, Corporación Financiera Alba at 11.7%, Abertis at 8.4%, Fomento de Construcciones y Contratas at 7.5% and Abengoa at 5.4%) with technical support from Sonera (now TeliaSonera, a Scandinavian cell phone carrier) which owned a non-controlling stake of 32.2%.

After several years during which the implementation of the Spanish government's recommendations was delayed, the latter threatened to withdraw the licence if public actions were not taken. Actual operations started in June 2006, when TeliaSonera, a minority holder until then, acquired up to 76.56% of Xfera's shares and stated that they would restart building its UMTS network and start offering mobile services later in the year.

In October 2006, Xfera announced that it would launch the commercial service in December under its new brand Yoigo. The new name was chosen to reflect the simplicity in rates and ease of use of their services.

At their launch in December 2006, Yoigo started with a limited UMTS network. Yoigo has now reached 80% national coverage, incorporating 4G LTE technology for their customers since summer 2013.

Yoigo's logo bears some resemblance to the style of Three's and Vivo's, which also have no single colour set.

Grupo MásMóvil bought the company in June 2016.

=== Brand positioning ===
Yoigo states that it bases its commercial strategy on "simplicity, efficacy, and low cost", and on the absence of small print, to differentiate itself from competitors. It seeks to define itself as "simple, just, clever, honest, and effective." Its advertising is simple, and uses childlike voices and phrases such as "real truth" or "really really" to gain consumers' confidence.

In December 2014, Yoigo implemented a change to its brand positioning, which highlights the differences compared to the rest of the operators.

Similarly, there are several versions of its logo in various colours to highlight its character as being different to other operators, which – according to Yoigo's advertising – differ only in colour.

== Criticisms ==
=== Before 2014 ===
Until December 2007, the change from a prepaid service to a contract or vice versa presented technical difficulties, motivating the association of FACUA consumers to present a complaint to Yoigo. This process can be solved at any Yoigo store or by calling Yoigo customer service. In October 2008, among other novelties, Yoigo added the possibility of accessing the Internet through HSDPA (previously only available with UMTS and GPRS). At Yoigo's market entry, at the end of 2006, CMT obligated the operator to make more than one rate available and not to impose a mandatory minimum consumption - with what secondary rates exist without minimum consumption that don't receive publicity. The difficulty in contracting new rates resulted in Yoigo receiving complaints from FACUA (these rates are no longer available).

On the other hand, they announced the limitation of free calls in January 2008, provoking great surprise and unhappiness among customers with notable repercussions throughout digital media. Various associations of consumers, like FACUA or the Union of Spanish Consumers in Asturias, have already filed complaints against Yoigo for various reasons or they have announced their intention to do so.

Yoigo addresses customers on familiar terms due to company policy. If a customer does not want the company to address them as such, they must explicitly request it.

In 2013, Movistar complained that Yoigo's new "Infinite" rates were overloading Movistar networks.

With the implementation of their new LTE network, Yoigo's terminals suffered some errors with notifications on various applications like Twitter, Facebook and WhatsApp Messenger. The problem laid in delays in the reception of instantaneous notifications which required adjustments in the network configuration.

According to FACUA, Yoigo received a total of 9.3% of the complaints related to mobile phones with less than 1% of the market quote in 2007. Since 2012, it is the fourth company after Vodafone, Movistar, and Orange to receive complaints from FACUA, with only 2.9% of the total number of complaints. That said, it is worth noting that Yoigo is the Spanish telephone company with its own network that receives the fewest complaints.

In terms of access to the Internet, Yoigo commercialized a Huawei E220 modem related to a contract with a different data rate.

== Market ==
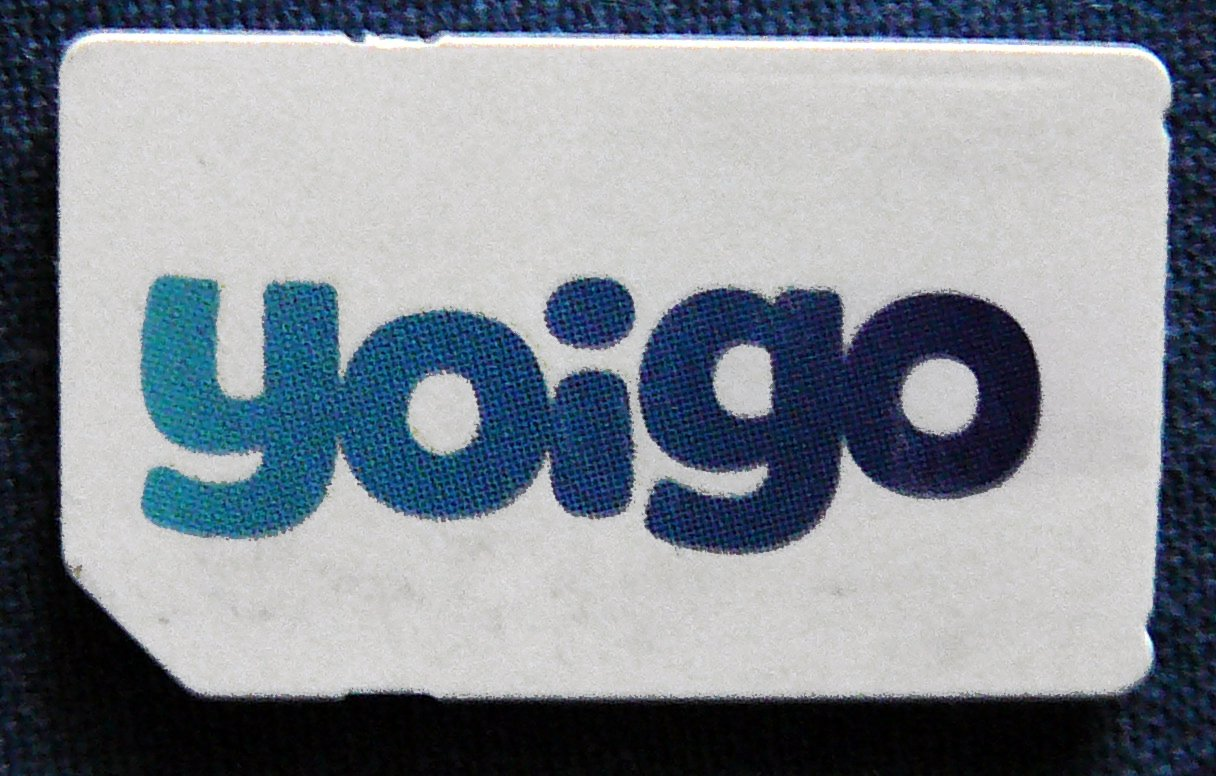
Yoigo SIM card

Yoigo's operations were hastily brought to market by TeliaSonera under pressure from the Spanish government, who had seen a six-year delay in the actual use of a much-valued UMTS license. Nevertheless, Yoigo's CEO claimed they held a European record in bringing a cell company to market, since from the time when TeliaSonera had gained control to the actual date of launch only 150 days had passed.

Yoigo was born with largely sparse coverage of its own, relying heavily on a national roaming agreement with Vodafone's GSM network. Thus, services such as fast 3G internet access were restricted to those on Yoigo's own coverage footprint, limited to the largest cities, and others like video calling were not present at all.

As for the sales network, Yoigo signed an exclusive 3-month agreement with The Phone House (Spanish branch of The Carphone Warehouse) for distribution of their products in physical shops, while making most of their sales at their online shop. In April 2007 talks were started with other distributors like Carrefour and El Corte Inglés, as Yoigo is not expected to create any sales network of its own. It does have only-brand stores under the form of franchises owned by The Carphone Warehouse and other smaller groups.

However, the simple and cheap rates Yoigo offered (0.12 € per minute and 0.12 € connection charge at every call, at any time or number within Spain) plus the inexpensive data plans (0.12 €/KiB up to a maximum of 1.20 € a day) drew customers. The company itself announced having tripled their expectations during the first months from launch and credited this unexpected success for the delays experimented in shipping of orders.

In January 2009 Yoigo reached its first million customers.

Between January and March 2016, Yoigo increased its revenues by 10.6%, reaching 221 million euros, as announced by its parent company TeliaSonera.

Yoigo's competitors range from the three main phone carriers in Spain (Movistar, Vodafone Spain and Orange España) to the new MVNOs like Simyo, Carrefour Móvil, Euskaltel Móvil, Happy Móvil (from The Carphone Warehouse) and Lebara.

=== Subsidy of mobile devices ===
In its market entry, Yoigo's CEO, Johan Andsjö, criticized the gift terminal strategy of other operators on various occasions, assuring that they would never offer free terminals. This supposes a different strategy with respect to the rest of the operators in Spain, where the majority of users change operator most often due to rates and services, according to studies conducted in 2005. From June 2008, Yoigo abandoned this practice and began to offer terminals virtually free, but in 2012 they again stopped subsidizing new phones or smartphones, uniting the Movistar and Vodafone initiative and leaving Orange as the only operator in Spain with this type of strategy.

=== Smartphone leasing ===
On the first week of March 2014, Yoigo announced that it would introduce what it described as 'car-style' leasing deals on a range of smartphones. The operator has yet to provide details of the handsets available under the plan or specific prices, other than clarifying that customers will need to pay an upfront fee followed by 24 monthly payments, its amounts depending on the chosen smartphone and plan. At the end of the 24 months, customers can either return the handset and sign up for a new model or else make a final payment to keep the phone.

== Company structure ==
With the intention of reducing costs, Yoigo structured itself as a shell company which operated in cooperation with several subcontracted firms: Ericsson for construction, management, and maintenance of their UMTS network; Dextra Móviles for handset purchase and logistics; Seur for deliveries; and Emergía for sales and customer service. Deadlines, overwhelming initial demand and Yoigo's peculiar structure brought problems during the company's initial months of operation, especially those related with order delivery (phones and SIM cards). Later, delivery services were apportioned to Correos, Spain's national post company, in place of Seur. As of now, this dilemma has been solved, and Yoigo has currently been awarded for their customer service.

== Technical agreements ==
At the time of its launch, Yoigo only offered coverage with its own 3G network in nine cities (Madrid, Barcelona, Bilbao, Valencia, Cuenca, Sevilla, Málaga, Cádiz and Palma de Mallorca). Since Q4 2011, Yoigo also has its own 2G network. It hoped that its deployment would be quicker to avoid providing service using other networks. Its 2G network operates in the 1800 MHz band and offers EDGE technology, while its 3G network operates in the 2100 MHz band and handles HSPA+ speeds. Since 22 July 2013, Yoigo offers 4G LTE in certain areas through the 1800 MHz band. Yoigo has reached an agreement with Pepephone which would allow Pepephone clients to make use of Yoigo's LTE network. This has been viewed with frustration due to Movistar's hesitancy in opening its data network up to MVNO through Yoigo.

=== Agreements on shared infrastructure and location ===
In July 2007, Yoigo subscribed to an agreement to share the location of antennas with its rival Movistar. The shared placement agreement included permission for each operation to install UMTS antennas in rented locations of each other, and would allow for both companies to reduce renting costs. However, the agreement did not imply that Yoigo subscribers would have full coverage or the network service of Movistar.

In January 2008, the firm made a similar agreement public about the use of shared location with Orange.

=== ADSL and FTTH ===
Yoigo made an agreement with Movistar in order to use its ADSL and FTTH network, merging the mobile and fixed internet networks of Movistar and Yoigo. This agreement is being researched by the CNMC, which has opened an expedited sanction of both companies to investigate whether this fusion violates the Law of Competition Defense.

=== Coverage through other networks ===
In its market entry, Yoigo had a national roaming agreement with Vodafone which guaranteed access to its GSM network until 2012, which offered 99% national coverage, significantly extending its area and quality of coverage, although access to Internet under Vodafone coverage is limited to GPRS speeds (maximum of 64 kbit/s). Therefore, some 3G network services which require a greater capacity and speed, like fast access to the internet, are limited to users who have Yoigo 3G network coverage. Customers that wish to access the internet under Vodafone coverage can do so, but only using GPRS access with smaller bandwidth.

Yoigo is extending its network in big population centers, although the expansion speed is limited by the hindrances of local corporations when installing new antennas. Even so, Yoigo, through Ericsson, is rapidly expanding its network.

On 11 March 2008, a new national roaming agreement was made public between Yoigo and Movistar. Starting in June 2008, it allows Yoigo clients to use the GSM and UMTS networks of Movistar, the most extensive in Spanish territory. The initial length of the agreement was 5 years. Although the agreement permits the use of Movistar's network in national territory, including protocol HSDPA, it doesn't guarantee the maximum data transfer speed. According to a Xataka Móvil report, the agreement with Vodafone will continue, although they prioritize the connection through Movistar.

On 21 February 2011, Yoigo announced that it would continue to use Movistar's network to provide service to clients that cannot find coverage under their own network. On 1 August 2013, it was announced that the national roaming agreement, which gave Yoigo access to Movistar's 2G and 3G networks, expanded its validity until 2016.

=== LTE network expansion ===
Yoigo has already begun to work on the expansion of its 4G LTE network in order to offer their services to about 80% of Spanish population in May 2016. At present, Yoigo's LTE technology network covers around 66% of Spanish population. The project has an investment of about 25 million euros, as the company reported. Yoigo will keep LTE technology in 50 provinces, but plans an extension to reach 1,163 Spanish municipalities, offering coverage to 7.5 million inhabitants.

== Issues ==
Yoigo has been experiencing some problems with its billing department, but were solved by launching "Mi Yoigo" app for its clients. Any normal process is carried out rapidly and efficiently, however, if intervention by their billing department is necessary, responses become slow, laborious and even defensive.

If a new customer wants to migrate from another company and keep his number, he must provide the same ID number. Otherwise this number portability process ("portabilidad" in Spanish) will fail and must be repeated.

== Mobile phone plans ==
As of April 2016, the following contractual plans are available:

- La Sinfín 25 GB.
- La del Cero 5 GB.
- La del Cero 1.2 GB.

Prepaid plans are also available:

- La del Uno 1 GB.
- La del Uno 650 MB.

== Statistics ==
- 2G Download Speed 1.7 Mb/
- 3G Download Speed 3.6 Mbit/s
- 4G Download Speed 14.5 Mbit/s
- 2G Upload Speed 0.7 Mbit/s
- 3G Upload Speed 1.3 Mbit/s
- 4G Upload Speed 9.5 Mbit/s
- 2G Latency 1081 ms
- 3G Latency 470 ms
- 4G Latency 140 ms
- 2G Data Reliability 92%
- 3G Data Reliability 95%
- 4G Data Reliability 97%
- 4G From 29 May 2013
- 824.297 Cell Towers
- 825 Cellular Networks
- 1.230.834.497 WI-FI Points
