= MásMóvil =

MásMóvil is one of the telecommunications service brands under which Xfera Móviles, S.A.U. (Yoigo), owned by the MásMóvil Group, operates. It offers fixed telephony, mobile telephony, internet (fibre and 5G) and television (Agile TV) services in Spain.

== History ==
The company MásMóvil was founded on 19 February 2006 by Meinrad Spenger and Christian Nyborg. After approval by the CMT on 12 May 2006, the service was launched commercially on 19 February 2008.

In March 2014, MásMóvil merged with Ibercom, a company listed on the MAB, which formally acquired MásMóvil, in order to retain the stock market token.

During 2014 and 2015, it bought small companies such as Neo, Quantum Telecom, Xtra Telecom and Embou. In these years, capital increases took place with the entry of investment funds and family-offices, which increased the availability of resources.

On 10 August 2015, it acquired the assets (fibre networks, etc.) resulting from the divestment commitments made by Orange Spain to the European Commission to obtain authorisation for its merger with Jazztel.

On 28 April 2016, it bought 100% of Pepephone's shares, at a cost of €158 million.

On 21 June 2016, it acquired 100% of Yoigo(Xfera Móviles, S.A.U.), the fourth largest mobile operator in Spain, after reaching an agreement with shareholders Telia, ACS, FCC and Abengoa. The purchase price was €612 millionand was authorised in September 2016. After the purchase, the operator became a subsidiary of MásMóvil Ibercom. The Yoigo brand was maintained and the MásMóvil brand was also used.

== Coverage ==
The coverage used is Yoigo's own coverage. In addition, it has agreements with Orange and Movistar to provide coverage where Yoigo's coverage does not reach.

By 2022, the MásMóvil Group 's total mobile coverage reached 98.5% of the Spanish population, and by 2021, it had fibre coverage of 26 million homes in Spain.By 2021, it had fibre coverage of 26 million households in Spain.

== Related links ==
- Official site
