= AMC Networks International Southern Europe =

Television company

- Type: Division
- Headquarters: Pozuelo de Alarcón, Madrid, Spain
- Areas served: Spain, Portugal, France, Italy
- Parent: AMC Networks International
- Website: amcnetworks.es

AMC Networks International Southern Europe (formerly AMC Networks International Iberia, Chello Multicanal and Multicanal) is a Madrid, Spain-based television company, owned by AMC Networks International.

In April 2010, it closed the purchase of Teuve, the producer and distributor of thematic channels 100% owned by ONO, incorporating new channels into its offer.

They operate channels under 26 channels (11 in HD and 3 in 4K) in Spain, Portugal, and previously France and Italy.

== Channels ==
=== Spain ===
- AMC (España)
- AMC Anime
- AMC Break (formerly Bio, A&E and Blaze)
- AMC Crime (formerly Crimen+Investigación)
- AMC Living (formerly Decasa)
- AMC Western
- ¡Buen Viaje!
- Dark
- Decasa
- Canal Cocina
- Odisea
- Historia (formerly a joint venture with The History Channel Iberia)
- Canal Hollywood
- VinTV (formerly Canal Panda and Enfamilia)
- Sol Música (FAST)
- pt:Somos
- Sundance TV (formerly Cinematk)
- es:XTRM

=== Portugal ===
- pt:AMC (Portugal)
- AMC Break (formerly Bio, A&E and Blaze)
- AMC Crime (formerly Crime+Investigation)
- História
- Odisseia

==== Dreamia ====
Dreamia is a joint-venture between AMC Networks International Southern Europe and NOS, producing channels and content dedicated to Portugal and Portuguese-speaking Africa.

- VinTV (formerly Panda Biggs/Biggs)
- Canal Hollywood
- Casa e Cozinha
- Canal Panda
- Panda Kids
- Blast

=== France ===
AMC Networks International left the French market in 2020.

- SundanceTV
- Extreme Sports Channel

== Logos ==
Logo of Chello Multicanal until Summer 2014

Logo of AMC Networks International
