= Studio TF1 America =

Canadian entertainment company

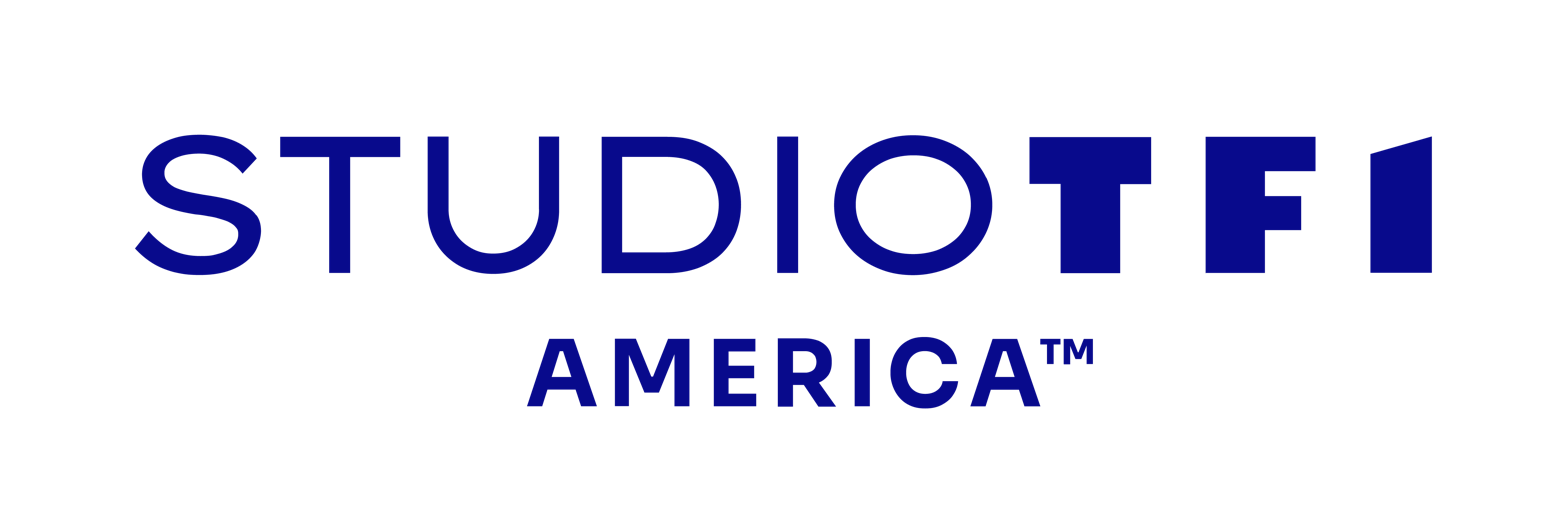
- Type: Subsidiary
- Industry: Television and film production and distribution
- Predecessor: Reel One Entertainment, Johnson Production Group
- Founded: May 2025; 1 year ago
- Area served: Worldwide
- Key people: Tom Berry (Chairman); Timothy O. Johnson (Managing Director)
- Parent: TF1 Group (65%); A+E Global Media (35%)
- Website: studiotf1america.com

Studio TF1 America is a Canadian television and film production and distribution company. It was established in May 2025 following the rebranding of Reel One Entertainment and Johnson Production Group (JPG). The company is a joint venture between France's TF1 Group and A+E Global Media and has become one of the largest producers and distributors of English-language television movies globally.

== History ==
Reel One Entertainment was originally founded in 2001 by producer Tom Berry under the name Première Bobine. The company gained prominence for its high-volume production and global distribution of made-for-TV movies, particularly in the romance, Christmas, and thriller genres. Its films were frequently aired on networks such as Lifetime and Hallmark Channel. In 2016, the company signed a deal with UP TV, to air its scripted series. In 2017, the company then partnered with US production and management firm The Cartel, to produce up to 40 movies by 2020.

In 2019, the French media company Newen, a subsidiary of TF1 Group, acquired a majority stake in Reel One. In 2021, A+E Networks acquired a 35% minority stake in the company. Also that year, the company signed a distribution deal with FilmRise for its title library.

In 2024, Newen also acquired Johnson Production Group, a Vancouver-based production company. In May 2025, Reel One and JPG were consolidated and rebranded as Studio TF1 America. The combined studio aims to expand its output of English-language content for international markets. The company then signed new deals at the NATPE.

== Operations ==
Studio TF1 America is headquartered in Montréal, with additional offices in Los Angeles and Vancouver. The company produces over 100 hours of original scripted content annually, including TV movies, miniseries, and full series. Its library exceeds 3,000 hours of English-language programming.

As of 2025, Tom Berry serves as Chairman of the Board, while Timothy O. Johnson serves as Managing Director.
