= Irish Pickers =

Irish television programme

- Genre: Reality
- Created by: Rob Carey
- Narrated by: Ardal O'Hanlon
- Country of origin: United Kingdom
- Original language: English

Production
- Executive producers: Rob Carey; Diana Carter
- Production company: Curve Media

Original release
- Network: Blaze
- Release: 2020

Irish Pickers is a reality television series launched in the UK and Ireland by Blaze in 2020 as the network's second piece of original content. Narrated by Father Ted's Ardal O'Hanlon, the series follows Irish antique dealer Ian Dowling and his team as they search for antiques and collectables on the island of Ireland. Dowling and his team "travel to prestigious, interesting and historic places" to buy quirky or unusual objects.

== Production ==
A+E Networks UK commissioned a British adaptation of its American television series American Pickers called Irish Hunters for its channel Blaze as its original programming. The British adaptation of the series will be filmed in Ireland with London-based production company Curve Media producing the British adaptation. Executive producer and co-creator Rob Carey said, "Escapist TV is important to people at the moment, and this is a chance to vicariously head out on the open road, meet some extraordinary people and see some extraordinary places."

== Content ==
The show focuses on antique dealer Ian Dowling. Dowling's 'picking' career developed from a young age. While attending a church fete aged 10, he purchased a baby monitor for 50p. He placed a free ad in a local traders magazine and sold it for £25. Ian described the feeling of becoming "hooked" after this experience and has been 'picking' ever since. The series is based around Dowling's business ‘Rare Irish Stuff’, which essentially sources rare Irish antiques and collectibles for clients. The business specializes in items for display in pubs and home bars.

Episodes have included Boston-born celebrity tattooer Mark Mahoney, who purchased an antique Irish medal for display at his Shamrock Social Club in Hollywood, and a bar where Oliver Reed once drank.
