= Agence CAPA =

French news agency and production company

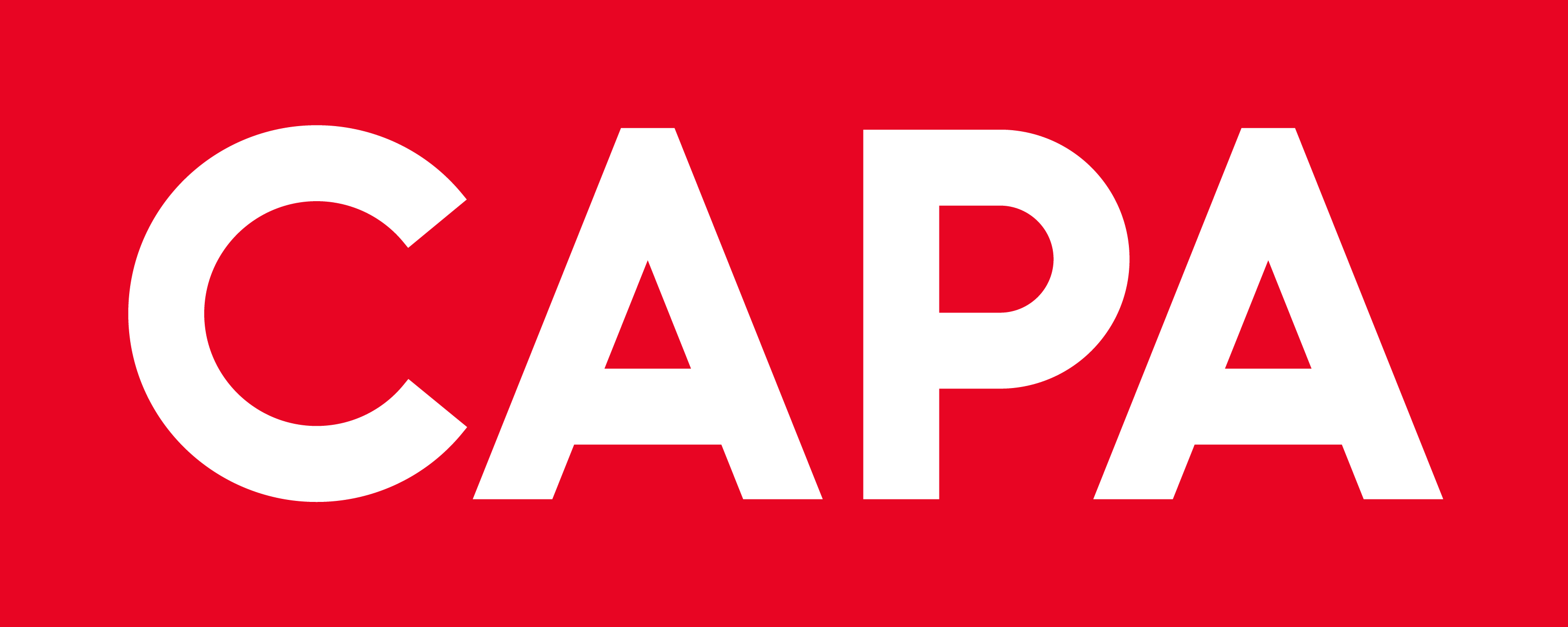
- Industry: Entertainment
- Founded: August 1, 1989; 37 years ago
- Founder: Hervé Chabalier
- Headquarters: Paris, France
- Owner: Studio TF1 (TF1 Group)
- Subsidiaries: CAPA Presse; CAPA Corporate; CAPA Drama
- Website: www.agencecapa.fr

CAPA (Chabalier & Associates Press Agency) is a French press agency and production company founded on August 1, 1989, by Hervé Chabalier. It is the largest production company for television reports and documentaries in France. The firm, which is part of Studio TF1 since 2011, produces about 150 hours of documentaries and television reports every year. It has 3 subsidiaries: CAPA Presse, CAPA Corporate and CAPA Drama.

== Activity ==
CAPA gained visibility in the 90's with the TV program 24 Heures, broadcast on Canal +. The show marks a new kind of offbeat journalism in France: as Hervé Chabalier explained it to Les Inrocks, in 2009 :"A channel had never delegated news gathering to an external company before".

Since then, CAPA notably produced L'Effet Papillon, from 2006 to 2018, and often collaborates to the direction and production of Envoyé Spécial, Spécial Investigation, Des Racines et des Ailes, Infrarouge, 66 minutes, and Pièces à conviction.

== History ==
Over the years, the group diversified, notably in fiction, with the creation of its subsidiary CAPA Drama. CAPA Drama produces Versailles, a TV show known as the most expensive French TV Show of all.

In 2007, the reporter Marc Garmirian is sent to Chad by CAPA Presse to investigate on the association L’Arche de Zoé and its controversial operation “Rescue Children”. Garmirian was arrested by the authorities and spent 11 days in prison with a few other humanitarians before getting back to France.

In June 2018, the two journalists, Sebastian Perez Pezzani and Didier Barral, who were making an investigation in Venezuela for “Caméléon”, a documentary series produced by CAPA Presse for the French channel 13ème Rue, got arrested by the venezuelan police. Both of them spent 10 days in prison before being released with the help of the French embassy.

In 2019, Netflix and CAPA Drama released Osmosis, the TV streaming’s second French original show.

CAPA notably received 3 Albert Londres Prize and 2 International Emmy Awards in fiction and documentary.

== Executives ==
- Guillaume Thouret: Group Managing Director (CAPA)
- Philippe Levasseur: Deputy Managing Director (CAPA Presse)
- Claude Chelli: Deputy CEO (CAPA Drama)
- Jacques Morel: Associate Director (CAPA Corporate)

== Governance and corporate structure ==
In February, 2010, Hervé Chabalier, CAPA main shareholder, sold 60% of his stakes to Newen.

In 2015, TF1 bought Newen.

In February 2016, Philippe Levasseur – ex reporter and documentaries author – is named chief executive of CAPA Presse.

== Selective filmography ==
=== CAPA Presse ===
- Boy Soldier (G. De Maistre - Canal+ / France 3 – 1990)

Best Documentary – International Emmy Awards – 1990

Albert Londres award – 1990

- Shackled Children (H. Dubois – 52’ – M6 – 1993)

Nominated for Best Documentary – International Emmy Awards 1993

Social and political documentary award – BANFF 1993

- Organ Snatchers (M.-M. Robin – 57’ – 1993)

Albert Londres award – 1993

- Kidnap and Ransom: a secret war (D. André – 52’ – France 2 – 2000)

Grand Prix – FIGRA – 2000

Best documentary award – BANFF – 2000

- Missing Women (M. Loizeau, A. Marant – 52’ – ARTE – 2006)

Albert Londres award – 2006

Grand Prix / Public Award – FIGRA – 2007

- Rape in the Ranks: the Enemy within (P. Bourgaux – 28’ – France 2 – 2007)

Best International Investigative Documentary – NYIFF – 2009

- Planet for Sale (A. Marant – 90’ – ARTE – 2011)

Jury Special Award – FIGRA – 2012

- Goldman Sachs, the Bank that Runs the World (J. Fritel, M. Roche – 71’ – ARTE – 2012)

Jury Special Award – FIGRA – 2013

- Terror Studios (A. Marant - 85’ - Canal+ / Discovery - 2016)

Nomination Social Issues / Current Affairs – Realscreen Awards – 2017

Nomination Social & Investigative - BANFF Rockie Awards – 2017

Nomination Best Documentary - International Emmy Awards – 2017

=== CAPA Drama ===
- Braquo
- Souviens-toi
- Versailles
- Osmosis
- Flic tout simplement
