= A+E Global Media =

American media company

A&E Television Networks, LLC
- Trade name: A+E Global Media
- Type: Subsidiary
- Industry: Mass media
- Predecessor: Hearst/ABC Video Services
- Founded: 1984; 42 years ago
- Headquarters: New York City, United States
- Key people: Paul Buccieri; (president); David Granville-Smith (COO, CFO)
- Products: Home video; Film; Television
- Services: Broadcasting and cable TV
- Total equity: est. $20 billion (2013)
- Parent: Hearst Communications
- Divisions: Consumer Enterprises; A+E Networks International; Digital Media; A+E Network; History Network
- Subsidiaries: A+E Studios; Lifetime Entertainment Services; Studio TF1 America (35% stake); Philo (stake)
- Website: www.aegm.com

A&E Television Networks, LLC (doing business as A+E Global Media) is an American multinational broadcasting company owned by Hearst Communications. A&E owns several non-fiction and entertainment-based television brands, including A&E, History Channel, Lifetime, FYI and their associated sister channels, as well as holding stakes, or licenses, in their international branches.

The company was founded in 1984 as a joint venture between Hearst, ABC (which was later purchased by Disney), and other partners, later including NBC. It launched the History Channel in 1995 and the Biography Channel in 1998, and acquired Lifetime Networks in 2009. Hearst and Disney became 50-50 owners of the company after NBC sold its minority stake in 2012. It continued as a 50–50 joint venture between Disney and Hearst, until Disney sold its stake to Hearst in 2026. Most of the company's back catalog is currently distributed by Hearst Television.

The company also has investments in Vice, Propagate Content, Atlas Obscura and Philo TV.

== History ==
A&E was formed from the merger of the Alpha Repertory Television Service and the Entertainment Channel, a premium cable channel, in 1984 with their respective owners keeping stakes in the new company. Thus A&E's shareholders were Hearst and ABC (from ARTS) and Radio City Music Hall (Rockefeller Group) and RCA, then the parent of NBC (from Entertainment Channel). The company launched A&E, at the time known as the Arts & Entertainment Network, on February 1, 1984, as a block on Nickelodeon (Nick) to fill in the time slot that ARTS held, as ARTS was a block on Nick. In 1985, the partners spun off A&E into its own 24 hour channel, and Nickelodeon later created Nick at Nite to fill in the time slot that A&E formerly held.

In 1990, after having aired episodes of its original 1960's version starting in 1987, A&E acquired rights to, and started producing new episodes of, the documentary series Biography— which became the channel's flagship program. The network also introduced its own companion magazine A&E Monthly.

The company indicated that plans for a history channel were in the works in 1993; it purchased the Lou Reda Productions documentary library and long-term rights for the Hearst Entertainment documentaries archive. In June 1993, the Rockefeller Group's Radio City Music Hall sold its 12.5% stake in A&E to the other three partners (now including NBC in place of RCA after GE's purchase of the latter in 1986) with NBC owning 25% and the other two 37.5% each. Also that month, a new production unit was set up.

=== A&E Networks ===
Logo used from 2011 to 2017

The A&E channel expanded to Canada, and later Mexico from 1993 to 1994. Biography began airing 5 nights a week in 1994. Also in 1994, A&E, on its 10th anniversary, changed its name from Arts and Entertainment to A&E.

A&E Networks launched the History Channel on January 1, 1995, with its UK counterpart following on November 1 in partnership with British Sky Broadcasting. A&E Networks considered History to be the driver in international expansion due to a lack of international rights to A&E international co-productions. As expected, the History Channel led A&E's overseas expansion in Brazil with TVA (April 1996), the Nordic and Baltic regions with Modern Times Group (1997), and in Canada (1997). By 1997, the company had started its AETN International division.

Formerly only direct sales, A&E Home Video initiated a six-month trial in which Barnes & Noble would sell the "Biography" line in stores, which became permanent in 1996. THC debuted in two other media in September 1996 with a radio program on ABC Radio Networks and Borders Books stocking THC videos.

The 'Biography' franchise continued to expand with a website in July 1996, a children's version launched in fall 1996, an audiotape line in 1997, telefilm development, a Crown published short biography line and debuted its magazine which replaced A&E Monthly. During the 1998–1999 season, Biography: American Justice and Biography Movies debuted.

History expanded in 1998 into tours of U.S. landmarks with Mayflower Tours having an affiliated website (historytravel.com), History Channel Traveler, and a planned quarterly magazine. While in October, History and MSG Network teamed up to produce several short-form sports history programs.

A+E spun out its two digital cable channels in November 1998 with The Biography Channel and History Channel International from A&E and the History Channel. A&E was spending $10 million per year to convert to the digital format and for digital distribution. With the need to revive a battered channel, improve the brand and create strong content for the A&E channel, A&E executive started the A&E IndieFilms division in 2005.

=== Post-Lifetime acquisition ===
In 2009, A&E Networks acquired Lifetime Entertainment Services (Lifetime, LMN, and Lifetime Real Women), which at the time was also jointly owned by Disney and Hearst, each with 50% ownership. Following the deal, Disney (owner of ABC) and Hearst each held approximately 42% of the combined company, while NBCUniversal retained approximately 16%. The deal included mechanisms by which NBCU could choose, or alternatively be forced to, exit the partnership over the subsequent 15 years. In May 2011, A&E Television Networks rebranded as "A+E Networks"; the new name was intended to signify its expansion towards other platforms besides television.

In 2012, NBCUniversal confirmed plans to divest its 15.8% stake in A+E Networks by way of a share repurchase, making Disney and Hearst 50-50 partners in the joint venture. The same year, A+E announced that Lionsgate Home Entertainment had acquired the home video distribution rights to its content, replacing New Video.

With a 2013 promotion to A+E Networks CEO, Nancy Dubuc launched a new in-house production unit, A&E Studios, and hired veteran BBC executive Jana Bennett to serve as the president of Biography Channel and LMN.

The Biography Channel was re-launched as FYI, a lifestyle-oriented network, in 2014. The channel's new president, Jana Bennett, had previously overseen The Learning Channel's early-2000s transition into a mainstream lifestyle channel.

In 2014, A+E took a 10% stake in Vice Media for $250 million. The company then announced in 2015 that H2 would be re-branded into a Vice channel with an indicated early 2016 launch. Director Spike Jonze, Vice's creative director, was said to be overseeing the development of the new 24-hour channel then. Disney also made a direct investment in Vice Media with two $200 million investments in November 2015 then a week later in December for about a direct 10% to assist in funding programming. In 2016, the company signed an international distribution deal with Pulse Films, and its East Entertainment formats and entertainment company.

A+E Networks took an equity stake at the 2015 formation of an independent TV production company, Propagate Content, run and owned by CEO Howard T. Owens and chief creative officer David McKillop, former A&E channel general manager. The development team led by Daniel Suratt had the company also investing in Epic Magazine, Samba and Panna food app-based content company in December 2015. Sean Cohan was promoted from head of international division to president of international and digital media in December 2015 as Suratt, head of digital media & business development, was promoted to president of corporate development, strategy and investments.

The company formed an in-house advertising agency, 45th & Dean, under executive vice president and general manager of FYI Network Paul Greenberg in 2016. In February 2017, A+E's in-house ad agency, 45th and Dean, was planning on developing new shows for Snapchat's Discover platform.

The Digital Media division launched its first direct to consumer streaming service, Lifetime Movie Club, in 2015. Then in 2016, the division launched another service, History Vault, followed by its Canadian version in November with Corus. Both have content at least a year off their respective channels. Club offers a rotating group of 40 films from the Lifetime library, while Vault has 400 documentaries at any one time.

The new Vice channel, branded as Viceland, launched on September 19, 2016. The next day, A+E Networks UK launched Blaze, a new free-to-air channel carrying programming aimed towards adult males.

=== 2017–2024 ===
In 2017, the company invested in a Series A funding round for Beautycon. A&E led a Series A funding round for Atlas Obscura in mid-2017. AETN in November 2017 took a substantial minority stake in Dan Abrams's LawNewz Network live court content website, which then renamed its website to Law&Crime Network.

In 2017, A+E Networks took a 25% equity stake in the National Women's Soccer League (NWSL), as part of a three-year media rights deal that saw Lifetime carry a package of weekly NWSL matches, and become a sleeve sponsor for all NWSL players. In February 2019, A+E ended the pact early and returned its 25% equity in the league, while continuing Lifetime's sleeve sponsorship.

In the second quarter of 2017, A+E Networks relaunched the Biography franchise with a set of two-hour specials and a miniseries for three of its channels, A&E, History and Lifetime. The franchise's TV programming will be recurring multi-formatted and tie into important anniversaries, newly found information about notables and current news. The initial set has the commonality of being crime centered, with at least one future set would focus on notable women. A+E Networks held its first convention, Alien Con, October 28–30, 2016 in partnership with Cosmic Con as an extension of the History channel's Ancient Aliens TV series.

In 2018, Dubuc resigned as CEO. A+E called back former CEO Abbe Raven to be interim CEO. Paul Buccieri was promoted from president of A&E Studios and A+E Networks Portfolio Group to A&E President. Buccieri formed the A&E Originals unit for unscripted series. This was followed by three first look deals with Leah Remini, Elizabeth Vargas and Gretchen Carlson. Vargas would serve as anchor of its A&E Investigates banner.

In 2018, the European Commission approved Disney's proposed acquisition of 21st Century Fox assets, but ordered A+E Networks International to divest certain factual television networks in the European Economic Area that overlap with the Fox assets being acquired, including Blaze, Crime & Investigation, History, H2, and Lifetime. A+E Networks launched its first OTT channel, Lively Place, through Wurl on Samsung TV Plus in December 2019.

A+E Networks sold several programs into the Latin American (DirecTV and Colombian broadcaster Plural TV) and US Hispanic (NBC Universo) markets in January 2019. This a part of attempt to offset declines in US basic cable business with sales to expanding markets like Latin America. A+E Networks agreed to a first-look development and production deal with Ozy Media in January 2020 for potential maker for A&E, History and Lifetime flagship cable channels.

In 2020, the company started its A&E Crime Central streaming service. The service has from the company's major channel libraries some 900 crime series and specials available. That year, it also licensed selected programs from the A&E and History libraries to NBCUniversal's new streaming service Peacock.

In 2021, A+E Networks acquired a 35% stake in Canadian studio Reel One Entertainment—one of the independent producers of Lifetime's television films—from Groupe TF1 subsidiary Newen.

In 2024, A+E Networks partnered with Warner Bros. Discovery/Lionsgate Entertainment/Gray Media-owned Free TV Networks to become joint owners in a broadcast network called Defy, which was formerly owned by the E. W. Scripps Company's Scripps Networks division. It was later acquired in December 2025 and currently owned by Versant.

=== A+E Global Media ===
In 2025, the company launched a new digital unit led by Ann McGowan. The company changed its name to A+E Global Media; president Paul Buccieri explained that the new name was more reflective of its current activities, which have included an increasing focus on content production and multi-platform distribution (especially via digital platforms).

Later in 2025, Disney and Hearst began exploring the sale of A+E Global Media following Comcast's plans to spin-off NBCUniversal’s cable networks into new company Versant and WBD's previously proposing the split of its cable networks to Discovery Global before the buyout by Paramount Skydance. Starz Entertainment was among the potential suitors to buy A+E Global Media from Disney and Hearst Communications.

In July 2026, Disney announced that it would sell its 50% stake to Hearst for $1.2 billion, with an estimated closing set for September. The deal was completed on September 23, 2026.

== Units ==
- A&E Networks International
- A&E Studios LLC
  - A&E Originals (2018–)
  - A&E IndieFilms (2005–) documentary feature film division
  - A&E Films
- A&E Networks Digital – manages History.com and Biography.com along with:
  - A&E, Fyi, History and Lifetime apps
  - OTT streaming channels Crime360 by A&E and Lively Place
  - Subscription streaming services: A&E Crime Central, History Vault and Lifetime Movie Club.
- A+E Ventures
  - Atlas Obscura (2017—)
  - Beautycon (March 2017—)
  - Propagate Content (March 2015—) stake
  - National Women's Soccer League (2017—2019) 25% share
  - Epic Magazine
  - Samba TV
  - Panna (December 2015—September 2019) food app-based content company, produced Love at First Bite show along with and for FYI sold to Discovery, Inc.
  - LawNewz Network d/b/a Law & Crime Network (November 2017—) substantial minority stake in Dan Abrams's live court content website and OTT channel
  - Reel One Entertainment (June 2021—) 35% stake
  - Vice Media (2014—) 20% stake
    - Vice TV
  - Philo (owned with Skydance and AMC Global Media)
- Consumer Enterprises - e-commerce, direct-to-consumer product ventures, live events
  - Alien Con (October 2016—present) became biennial by 2019
  - Bring It Live! (2017—)
  - History Talk (fall 2019—)
  - History Speaks (2020—) podcast working title for extended interviews, original content, behind-the-scenes footage and conversations
- Six West Media
- 45th & Dean, in-house ad agency

=== TV channels ===
- A&E
- FYI
- History Channel
  - History en Español
  - Military History
- Lifetime Entertainment Services
  - Lifetime
  - LMN
  - LRW
- Defy (joint venture with Free TV Networks)

==== Crime & Investigation ====
Crime & Investigation
- Country: United States
- Broadcast area: Nationwide
- Headquarters: New York City, United States

Programming
- Language: English
- Picture format: 1080i HDTV (downscaled to letterboxed 480i for the SDTV feed)

Ownership
- Owner: A+E Global Media

History
- Launched: April 1, 2005; 21 years ago

Links
- Website: www.crimeandinvestigationnetwork.com

Availability

Streaming media
- Service(s): Frndly TV, Philo

Crime & Investigation, stylized as Crime + Investigation or C&I airs mostly off-network reruns of crime dramas such as 24, Nash Bridges, and Hack, and the A&E crime documentary shows SWAT, Uncovered, The First 48, American Justice, The Big House and Vanished With Beth Holloway. The channel also broadcasts internationally.

=== A+E Studios ===
A+E Studios, LLC
- Type: Subsidiary
- Founded: 2013; 13 years ago
- Parent: A+E Global Media
- Website: www.aenetworks.com/divisions/ae-studios

A+E Studios, LLC (stylized as A+E Studios) is the company's in-house scripted production company. The studio's divisions include A+E Originals and A+E IndieFilms.

A+E Networks formed the studio in June 2013 under president Bob DeBitetto with three projects in development, one for each flagship channels. At MIPCOM in October 2014, International executive vice president Sean Cohan and DeBitetto launched A+E Studios International as a distribution and financing unit to distribution A+E Studios productions. With the October 2016 retirement of DeBitetto, Paul Buccieri took over his post as president of A+E Studios and A+E Networks Portfolio Group from the post of president of A+E Network and History.

Buccieri formed the A+E Originals unit for unscripted series placing Steve Ascher, Former History executive, in day-to-day charge as vice president in 2007. Soon thereafter in April 2018, A+E agreed to a third season for "Scientology and the Aftermath" documentary series and a first-look development deal with Leah Remini.

Also in April 2018, A+E Originals signed Elizabeth Vargas to a first-look and production deal. Vargas would serve as anchor of its A+E Investigates, its banner for new non-fiction prime time journalism programming. In April 2018, A+E Originals signed a first-look deal with former Fox News anchor Gretchen Carlson to host three documentaries. Ascher was promoted to senior vice president, production and development of A+E Originals.

In July 2019, Pop announced a series order from A+E Studios for Best Intentions. With the re-merger of Viacom-CBS in March 2020, Pop dropped the series and allowed A+E Studios to shop the show. More recently, the studio signed a deal with Silver Lining Entertainment Partners.

==== Filmography ====
- Houdini – History (2014) miniseries
- Unreal – Lifetime (2015–2018), Hulu (2018)
- The Returned – A&E (2015)
- Sons of Liberty – History (Miniseries, 2015)
- Knightfall – History (TV series, 2017–2019) in association with Lionsgate Television
- You – Lifetime (season 1), Netflix (season 2–5) (TV series, 2018–2025)
- Project Blue Book – History (TV series, 2019–2020)
- American Princess – Lifetime (TV series, 2019)
- Reprisal – Hulu (TV series, 2019)
- Big Sky – ABC (TV series, 2020–2023)
- The Liberator – Netflix (Miniseries, 2020)
- The Lincoln Lawyer – Netflix (TV series, 2022–2027)
- A&E Investigates (2018–) A&E Originals
  - Cults and Extreme Belief (May 28, 2018–present)
  - The Plot Against America special (June 4, 2018) examining counter-intelligence versus Russia since 2001
  - The Untitled Word of Faith Fellowship Project (working title)
  - Child Brides (working title)

==== A&E IndieFilms ====
A&E IndieFilms is the feature documentary film production division of A&E Studios, LLC with a staff of two.

The subdivision was launched in 2005, in response to the success of theatrical documentaries such as Fahrenheit 9/11 and Super Size Me and with the need to revive a battered channel, improve the brand and create strong content for the A&E channel. Molly Thompson was hired in 2005 for the division and executive produced all the division's films to 2009. Thompson was promoted to division vice president in January 2009, then senior vice president by April 2016. At this time, A&E IndieFilms was a division of A&E Studios. Thompson, senior vice president of feature films for A+E Networks at this time, left in January 2019 for Apple's streaming service in a similar position.

===== Films =====
- Murderball (2005) distributed by THINKFilm
- Rock School (2005) distributed by Newmarket Films
- Jesus Camp (2006) Oscar-nominated, distributed by Magnolia Pictures
- Street Thief (2006)
- My Kid Could Paint That (2007) by director-producer Amir Bar-Lev, distributed by Sony Pictures Classics
- American Teen (2008) distributed by Paramount Vantage
- The September Issue (2009) distributed by Roadside Attractions
- Client 9: The Rise and Fall of Eliot Spitzer (2010) distributed by Magnolia Pictures
- The Tillman Story by director-producer Amir Bar-Lev (2010) distributed by The Weinstein Company
- Corman's World: Exploits of a Hollywood Rebel (2011) distributed by Anchor Bay Films
- Magic Trip (2011) distributed by Magnolia Pictures
- The Imposter (2012) Film4 and Channel 4 presentation of a RAW Production in association with Red Box Films and Passion Pictures distributed by Indomina Releasing
- Under African Skies (2012) Radical Media
- The Last of Robin Hood (2013) Errol Flynn bio-film
- Supermensch: The Legend of Shep Gordon (2013) distributed by RADiUS-TWC
- Happy Valley (2014) Asylum Entertainment, Passion Pictures, distributed by Music Box Films
- Lila & Eve (2015) distributed by Samuel Goldwyn Films, aired on Lifetime
- Cartel Land (2015) distributed by The Orchard
- Author: The JT Leroy Story (2016) distributed by Amazon Studios
- Life, Animated (2016) distributed by The Orchard
- City of Ghosts (2017)
- Studio 54 (2018)
- Meeting Gorbachev (2018) History 100; Spring Films and Werner Herzog Film, History Films
- Watergate (2018) History 100; Representational Pictures, HISTORY Films
- Divide and Conquer: The Story of Roger Ailes (2018) Impact Partners and produced by Jigsaw Productions in association with Baird Film, distributed by Magnolia Pictures
- Learning to Skateboard in a Warzone (If You're a Girl) (2019)

==== History Films ====
History Films is a production company associated with the History channel and led by Molly Thompson as executive producer and head of documentary films for A+E Networks until January 2019.

- Cave of Forgotten Dreams (2010)
- National Lampoon: Drunk Stoned Brilliant Dead (2015)
- Meeting Gorbachev
- No Place on Earth
- The Unknown Known: The Life and Times of Donald Rumsfeld
- Drunk Stoned Brilliant Dead: The Story of the National Lampoon
- Being Evel (2018)
- Meeting Gorbachev (working title; 2018) History 100; Spring Films and Werner Herzog Film in association with A&E IndieFilms
- Watergate (2018) History 100 series; Representational Pictures in association with A&E IndieFilms

=== A+E Networks International ===
A+E Networks International is the international division of A+E Networks, which handles international operations outside the U.S., mostly through joint ventures. A&E is an associate member of: the Caribbean Cable & Telecommunications Association and the Caribbean Cable Cooperative.

A+E Networks started AETN International by 1997 with A&E channel in Canada and Mexico and the History channel in the UK, Brazil, the Nordic and Baltic regions and in Canada. The History Channel UK was its first joint venture with British Sky Broadcasting. In 1997, A&E purchased a one-third stake in Mundo Olé.

AETN All Asia Networks was formed in April 2007 through a joint venture between A&E Television Networks and Malaysia's pay TV provider Astro Overseas Limited. AETN and Network 18 Group in August 2010 formed a joint venture (49/51%), AETN-18 India, which would first launch the History and Bio channels in India.

A&E International moved into France with a deal with Canal Plus Group for channel carriage in France on its CanalSat satellite platform in the second half of 2013 and A&E programs for Canal's D8 and D17 free-to-air channels. In July 2013, A+E Networks bought out Astro Overseas's stake in AETN All Asia Networks and renamed it to A+E Networks Asia. A&E Networks Italy was established in December 2013, launching the local version of Crime & Investigation, as well as buying out the Italian version of History from its local partner, Fox International Channels. A&E Networks UK launched the Blaze channel on 20 September 2016 as its first free-to-air channel.

Sean Cohan was promoted from head of international division to president of president, international and digital media, which add another division, digital media, for him to oversee in December 2015 as head of digital media & business development was promoted to president, corporate development, strategy and investments. In December 2016, the company appointed Patrick Vien and Edward Sabin as executive managing directors and co-heads of international reporting to Sean Cohan, A+E Networks' president of international and digital media. Vien oversaw Europe, the Middle East and Africa operations and programming acquisitions, sales and strategy for all non-US channels. Operations in Latin America, Canada, Asia, Australia and New Zealand would be overseen by Sabin along with global operations team and A&E formation production. Sabin was promoted from managing director of the Americas and head of commercial operations, while Vien left a post at Pulse Film.

On September 20, 2016, A&E Networks UK launched Blaze, a new free-to-air channel carrying programming aimed towards adult males. In May 2017, the company extended its distribution deal with Sky for the UK, Ireland, Italy, Germany, and Austria market (A+E Networks U.K., A+E Networks Germany, A+E Networks Italy) channels. A+E Networks Asia launched Its Korea country unit in October 2017 with two channels. As part of the contingency for approval Disney's acquisition of the vast majority of 21st Century Fox's assets, it agreed to sell the 50% of its operations and proposed Hearst as acquirer of 4 European entities representing A+E Networks' operations in Europe in order to avoid dominant conflict of interest by its resultant ownership of operating National Geographic Partners' assets in Europe. The plan was approved on January 28, 2019, 9 days after the globally announced closure of the transaction with Hearst assuming full ownership of all entities.

Vien was promoted to group managing director – International, A+E Networks in July 2019 with Sabin exiting the company. In October 2019, Twentieth Television executive Steve MacDonald was hired as president of its global content licensing and international division over Vien. In July 2019, a managing director, Asia which consolidates the Asia region again including Southeast Asia, Taiwan, Hong Kong and India.

The international division began a push into production in the late 2010s. With Element 8, A&E produced Miss Scarlet and the Duke, which was sold in December 2019 to Masterpiece (US), Alibi channel(UK), CBC (Canada), Seven Network (Australia) and RTL (Germany). A+E Networks International agreed in November 2019 to globally distribute its first Spanish-language series, Hernán, by Spain's Onza Entertainment and Dopamine, units of Grupo Salinas.

On September 12, 2024, A+E Networks EMEA rebranded to Hearst Networks EMEA.

==== Availability ====
- Blaze: United Kingdom
- Crime & Investigation: Bulgaria, Croatia, Czech Republic, Netherlands, Romania, Poland, Slovakia, Slovenia, Serbia, South Africa, United Kingdom
- History: Arabia, Belgium (Flanders), Croatia, Czech Republic, Denmark, Estonia, Finland, Hungary, Italy, Latvia, Lithuania, Netherlands, Norway, Poland, Portugal, Romania, Serbia, Slovakia, Slovenia, South Africa, Spain, Sweden, Latin America
- History 2: Arabia, Denmark, Finland, Ireland, Norway, Poland, Serbia, Slovenia, Sweden, Latin America.
- Lifetime: Poland, Latin America, South Africa
- FYI: India
- Sky History: Ireland and United Kingdom
- MysteryX: Ireland and United Kingdom

==== A+E Networks Australia ====
A+E Networks Australia launched on Thursday 16 February 2012. A&E is a male-skewed channel that focuses on 'real life' content, similar to that of its American counterpart.

==== A+E Networks Latin America ====
A+E Networks Latin America is a joint venture between A+E Networks International and Ole Communications.

In 1996, HBO Latin America Group and Venezuela's Olé Communications began a basic cable channel joint venture Mundo Olé in Mexico. The channel was launched in October 1996. In 1997, A&E purchased a one-third stake in Mundo Olé. With in a year, A&E was supplying 60% of the channel's shows. In 1998, Mundo began producing local Biography episodes. In 2000, the word Olé was dropped, causing Mundo Olé to become Mundo. The next year, Mundo was renamed to A&E Mundo but continued airing the Biography series. The channel was renamed once more as A&E in 2005. Back in 1992, History Latin America was launched as TVQuality. It continued to use that name until 2000, when it became The History Channel. From 2008, it is still History since then. In 2012, A&E Latin America opened an office in Brazil. The Biography Channel was launched in Latin America in 2007; however, when the US Bio. network became FYI in 2014, The Latin American network is now H2 since then. Lifetime Latin America was launched in July 2014 as a joint venture between A+E Networks Latin America and Sony Pictures Television with distribution by HBO Latin America Group. As of 2020, A+E Networks Latin America channels continue to be distributed across Latin America through Ole Distribution.

==== A+E Networks UK ====
A+E Networks UK is a joint venture between A&E Global Media and A&E Television Networks (UK) Ltd, in conjunction with BSkyB History Ltd, a unit of the Sky Group subsidiary of Comcast. A+E Networks UK continues to operate in Europe and Africa. Their networks include Blaze (FTA), the European and African versions of Crime & Investigation, History, H2 and Lifetime. Most of the channels are available on BT, Sky, TalkTalk and Virgin Media.

===== UK history =====
The History Channel UK began as a joint venture of A&E Networks (the company's first international JV) and British Sky Broadcasting to launch The History Channel UK on November 1, 1995, as a part-time channel broadcasting from 3 pm to 7 pm with plans to go full-time in 1996 or 1997 when its digital transponder was launched. The three original programs, "History Alive", "Our Century", and "Biography", were British hosted and tailored.

The joint venture expanded with the launching of Military History channel in July 2008. Soon thereafter, The History Channel was rebranded to History. Crime and Investigation and Bio launched in HD on Sky UK and Sky Ireland on 5 November 2008. The History Channel UK joint venture was renamed to AETN UK on July 2, 2009.

AETN UK joint venture, following the A&E post-Lifetime merger branding, was rebranded as A+E Networks UK on September 22, 2011. H2 channel was launched in the UK on May 4, 2013. A+E UK launched Lifetime for UK and Ireland market in November 2013. On September 20, 2016, A+E UK launched Blaze, its global free to air channel, in the British Isles, its first market, on Sky and Freeview.

A+E Networks UK with Netflix and Sky Vision in April 2016 on I Am a Killer true crime 10-episode show for Crime + Investigation Network with a UK spring debut followed by Italy's and Poland's Crime + Investigation airing later in the year. Then the show would be available on Netflix. In February 2020, the company commissioned Lost Relics of the Knights Templar five part series from Fired Up Films of Belfast and Krempelwood of London and distributed by Entertainment One (now Lionsgate Canada) to air in April 2020 on History in the U.K., Ireland, Sweden, the Netherlands and Belgium. As part of the contingency for approval Disney's acquisition of the vast majority of 21st Century Fox's assets, it agreed to sell the 50% of its operations and proposed Hearst as acquirer of 4 European entities representing A+E Networks' operations in Europe in order to avoid dominant conflict of interest by its resultant ownership of operating National Geographic Partners' assets in Europe. The plan was approved on January 28, 2019, 9 days after the globally announced closure of the transaction with Hearst assuming full ownership of AETN UK.

AETN UK launched two subscription video on demand channels in May 2019 and June 2019, History Play and Crime+Investigation Play, respectively. In May 2020, History and H2 were renamed Sky History and Sky History 2 respectively, to match Sky's two new channels (Sky Documentaries and Sky Nature) which launched at the same time.

==== A+E Networks Germany ====
A joint venture with NBCUniversal International from 2005 to 2017, the US parent company decided in June 2017 to take complete control of its German spin-off, based in Munich. A+E Networks Germany operates the two pay TV channels: History and A&E in Germany, Austria, Switzerland, Luxembourg, Liechtenstein and South Tyrol. The company also operated The Biography Channel Germany from 31 March 2007 until 22 September 2014 which was then replaced by A+E Germany. To gain regulatory approval of Disney's acquisition of most of 21st Century Fox's assets, it agreed to sell its 50% stake to Hearst. The plan was approved on January 28, 2019, 9 days after the globally announced closure of the transaction with Hearst assuming full ownership of The History Channel (Germany) GmbH &Co KG.

==== A+E Networks Italy ====
A+E Networks had launched History Channel in Italy as joint-venture with Fox International Channels. A&E has established a local office in December 2013 and has launched Crime and Investigation on December 16. The joint-venture with Fox was planned for buy out in early 2014. In March 2017 A+E Italy launched Blaze.

While, A&E Italy has been producing locally with some of them being picked up international, the company began producing or commissioning films with international potential being with its 2018 releases. The first of this group was Emanuela Orlandi/Vanished Special picked up by Sky in Italy, Germany's ZDF and Belgian public television RTBF and produced by B&B Film. As part of the contingency for approval Disney's acquisition of the vast majority of 21st Century Fox's assets, it agreed to sell the 50% of its operations and proposed Hearst as acquirer of 4 European entities representing A+E Networks' operations in Europe in order to avoid dominant conflict of interest by its resultant ownership of operating National Geographic Partners' assets in Europe. The plan was approved on January 28, 2019, 9 days after the globally announced closure of the transaction with Hearst assuming full ownership of A&E Television Networks Italy Srl.

==== The History Channel Iberia ====
The History Channel Iberia is a joint venture of A+E Networks and AMC Networks International Southern Europe, formerly Multicanal then Chello Multicanal.

A+E Networks has launched Canal de Historia in Spain and Portugal in 1996 in joint-venture with Multicanal. In 2005 was launched The Biography channel (later Bio), which was replaced by A&E on 2 October 2014., and later, on 18 April 2018 A&E was replaced by Blaze. Crime & Investigation Network was launched on 1 February 2011. As part of the contingency for approval Disney's acquisition of the vast majority of 21st Century Fox's assets, it agreed to sell the 50% of its operations and proposed Hearst as acquirer of 4 European entities representing A+E Networks' operations in Europe in order to avoid dominant conflict of interest by its resultant ownership of operating National Geographic Partners' assets in Europe. The plan was approved on January 28, 2019, 9 days after the globally announced closure of the transaction with Hearst assuming full ownership of The History Channel, Iberia SL (Spain).

==== A+E Networks Asia ====
A+E Networks Asia is the Southeast Asia and Australia branch of A+E Networks International operating six channels and is headquartered in Singapore with an additional operation in Kuala Lumpur, Malaysia.

AETN All Asia Networks (AAAN) was formed in April 2007 through a joint venture between A&E Television Networks and Malaysia's pay TV provider Astro Overseas Limited to serve in the Southeast Asian, Hong Kong and Taiwanese markets. History and Crime & Investigation Network were launched in Singapore, Malaysia, Hong Kong, and Brunei on June 15, 2007, with the History Channel only in Thailand. A December launch was expected for the Philippines. In 2008, AAAN planned to launch the Biography Channel.

In 2009, AETN Asia Networks struck a US$800,000 co-production deal with the National Film Development Corporation of Malaysia to co-produce programs to be featured across its channels. It has recently hired SPE Networks as a regional ad sales representative across the South East Asian region.

In the late first half of 2013, All Asia Networks launched Lifetime and H2. In July, A+E Networks bought out Astro Overseas's stake in AETN All Asia Networks and renamed it to A+E Networks Asia. Its Korea country unit was launched in October 2017 with two channels, History and Lifetime, under general manager Youngsun Soh.

With Alan Hodges leaving as managing director of Asia-Pacific, the unit was split into Southeast Asia & Australia and North Asia (Korea, Japan and China) in May 2018. The managing director for Southeast Asia and Australia appointed was Leena Singarajah from Scripps Network. The managing director for North Asia appointed was Saugato Banerjee.

Saugato Banerjee was named in July 2019 as managing director, Asia which consolidates the Asia region including Southeast Asia, Taiwan, Hong Kong and India under him.

==== A+E Networks India ====
Formerly known as AETN-18 India, a joint venture between Network18 Group, A+E Networks India is the Indian branch of A+E Networks Asia that operates around South Asia.

=== A+E Networks Home Entertainment ===
A+E Networks Home Entertainment is the home entertainment division of A+E Networks. It creates and distributes content from A+E Networks' channels included A&E, Biography & History branded products. It also distributes content it has acquired the rights to including hit American television series, British comedies, cult TV and sports programming.

== See also ==
- ESPN, LLC, which has the same ownership partners as A+E Global Media
- American Broadcasting Company
- Hearst Communications
- The Walt Disney Company
