= R (cable operator) =

Spanish telecommunications company

R Cable y Telecable Telecomunicaciones, S.A.U.
- Trade name: R
- Formerly: R Cable y Telecomunicaciones Galicia, S.A.
- Company type: Sociedad anónima unipersonal
- Industry: Telecommunications, Media
- Founded: A Coruña, Spain (1999; 27 years ago)
- Headquarters: A Coruña, Spain
- Area served: Galicia
- Key people: Arturo Dopico, CEO
- Services: Digital television, broadband Internet, fixed-line telephone, mobile telephony as MVNO
- Owner: Euskaltel, S.A.
- Number of employees: 200
- Website: mundo-r.com

R Cable y Telecomunicaciones Galicia, S.A. is a Spanish telecommunications company that offers fixed and mobile telephone, television and broadband internet services to businesses and consumers in Galicia, Spain.

== History ==
In 1998, when the telecommunication industry was liberalized, Galicia, Spain adjudicated a contest to deploy wire in the area. At stake in the contest were three territorial demarcations: A Coruña, Santiago de Compostela and the rest of Galicia. The contracts for the three demarcations were won by the Galician Group of Companies for the Wire, Group Wire S.A. The two group companies would later merge to form R Cable y Telecomunicaciones Galicia, S.A. when the demarcations were consolidated administratively.

During 2006, R expanded its geographic operations, offering direct access services to small areas in Galicia such as Monforte de Lemos, Sarria, Sada, O Porriño and A Laracha. R also established agreements with other municipal councils like Xove, Burela, Vilalba, Ribadeo and Viveiro.

In July 2015, Euskaltel made a purchase offer of 1.155 billion euros, which was later increased to 1.190 billion euros in October 2015, when the sales agreement was signed.

In 2019, following Euskaltel's acquisition of R (R Cable y Telecomunicaciones Galicia, S.A.U.) and Telecable (Telecable de Asturias, S.A.U.), the former merged with the latter through absorption, forming a new company named R Cable y Telecable Telecomunicaciones, S.A.U.

== Services ==
R provides television, broadband Internet, and mobile telephony services to over 820,000 homes and companies in the Galicia region. The television service brings over a hundred channels to customers with the related signal decoder. It includes Oriel, a pay television service where customers can order films, sports programming, and television series. For customers without the signal decoder, R provides about two dozen channels. R also provides TDT channels and other channels for those with the DVB-C cable reception system. For Internet service, R offers various speed packages from 3 Mbit/s to 100 Mbit/s. (Note: The Internet speed packages listed are for download rates. Upload rates are a smaller fractions.) R was one of first operators to offer 100 Mbit/s asymmetric speeds in Spain. On 20 November 2007, the eighth anniversary of the company, R launched a mobile telephony service as a Mobile virtual network operator (i.e. it uses the antenna network of another company). The service went live on 3 December, and has garnered 190,000 customers.

== Corporate affairs ==
R has had numerous changes in ownership, including 25 major shareholding exchanges. One of its most important changes was in September 2008, when Caixanova, NCG Banco's predecessor, bought the 35.44% held by Unión Fenosa (which was acquired by Gas Natural), which gave Caixanova a 66.24% share.

In April 2010, British private equity firm CVC Capital Partners acquired a 35% stake in R. In November, CVC exercised an option to increase its stake to 70% in an agreement in which the current shareholders looked for "to guarantee the future of the Galicia City of the project, keeping its current social headquarters". In February 2014, CVC acquired the remaining 30% of the stock from NCG Banco. In November 2015, Euskaltel acquired R.

== Gallery ==
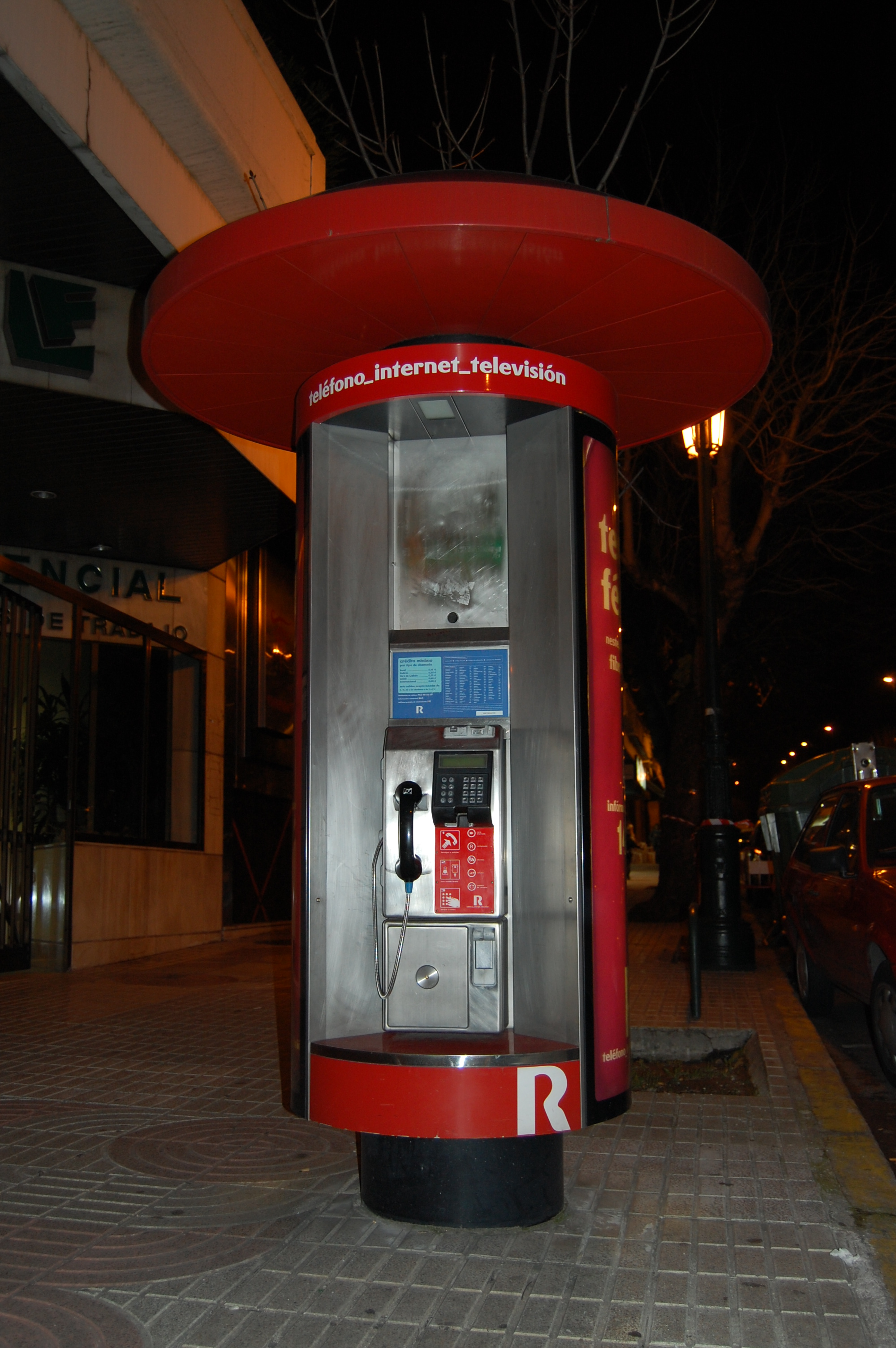
A Mundo-R telephone booth in Vigo.

== See also ==
- Cogent Communications
- Euskaltel – Basque telecommunications company, owner of R
- Tata Communications
- Telecable – Asturian telecommunications company, also subsidiary of Euskaltel
