= Studio TF1 =

French television production company

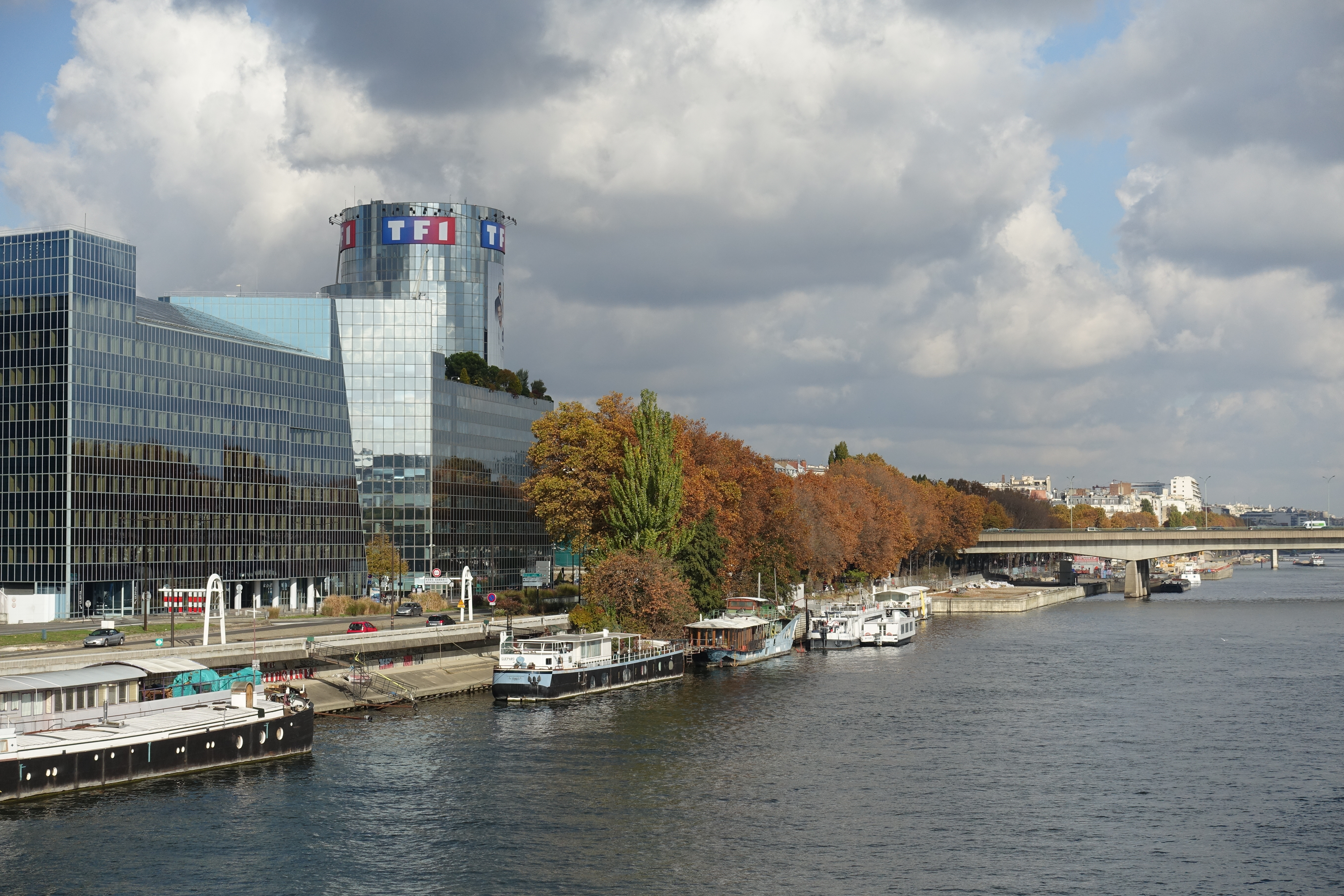
- Studio TF1 headquarters in Boulogne-Billancourt (TF1 Tower)
- Formerly: Newen (2008–2022); Newen Studios (2022–2025)
- Type: Subsidiary
- Industry: Television
- Founded: 18 July 2008; 17 years ago
- Founder: Fabrice Larue
- Headquarters: Paris, France
- Key people: Bibiane Godfroid (chairwoman, CEO)
- Services: Television production
- Parent: TF1 Group
- Subsidiaries: Studio TF1 America; Anagram; Telfrance; CAPA; 17 Juin Média iZen; Blue Spirit; Tuvalu; Pupkin; Nimbus; De Mensen; Ad Astra; Dog Haus; Joi Productions; Barjac; Real Lava; Amsto; Marysol; Télécip; Slate Entertainment; Indalo y Media; Flanagan Productions; Aux Singuliers; Kubik Films; Moonshaker; Daï Daï Films; Partita Films; Tall&Small; Flare Film; Rise Films; B-Side Productions; Digital Banana Studio; Studio TF1 Distribution; Felicita Films
- Website: www.studiotf1.com

Studio TF1 (formerly known as Newen and later Newen Studios) is a French television production company, the producers of such shows as Versailles, Braquo, and Plus belle la vie.

== History ==
In November 2015, TF1, France's leading television network, bought a 70% share of Fabrice Larue's FLCP, the holding company of Newen.

Newen is the second-largest producer of drama in France. It owns Telfrance, Agence CAPA, Be Aware and 17 juin média, with Telfrance producing the soap, Plus belle la vie.

CAPA is the producer of Braquo and Versailles.

In May 2017, Newen Group launched a €50 million investment fund focused on acquiring British drama. In 2018, it was announced that Newen had acquired a 60% equity interest in production outfit, Punkin, through Tuvalu Media Group. It was also announced that Newen acquired a 33% equity stake in the Danish studio Nimbus Film. In July 2019, it acquired a majority stake in Canadian studio Reel One Entertainment, which primarily produces television films.

Fabrice Larue is the founder, former CEO, and chairman of Newen Group. In April 2024, Pierre Branco—a former Warner Bros. Discovery EMEA executive—was named the new CEO of Newen. Later in the year, it also acquired Johnson Production Group, another studio primarily involved in television films.

In January 2025, it was announced that Newen would rebrand as Studio TF1, aligning it with its parent company. It was also revealed that the company planned to expand its film distribution business, including expanding to theatrical distribution in France in 2026, and aiming to release 10 to 15 films per-year by 2027.

== Productions ==
- Braquo
- Versailles
- Plus belle la vie
- The Seduction (under Felicita Films)
