= História =

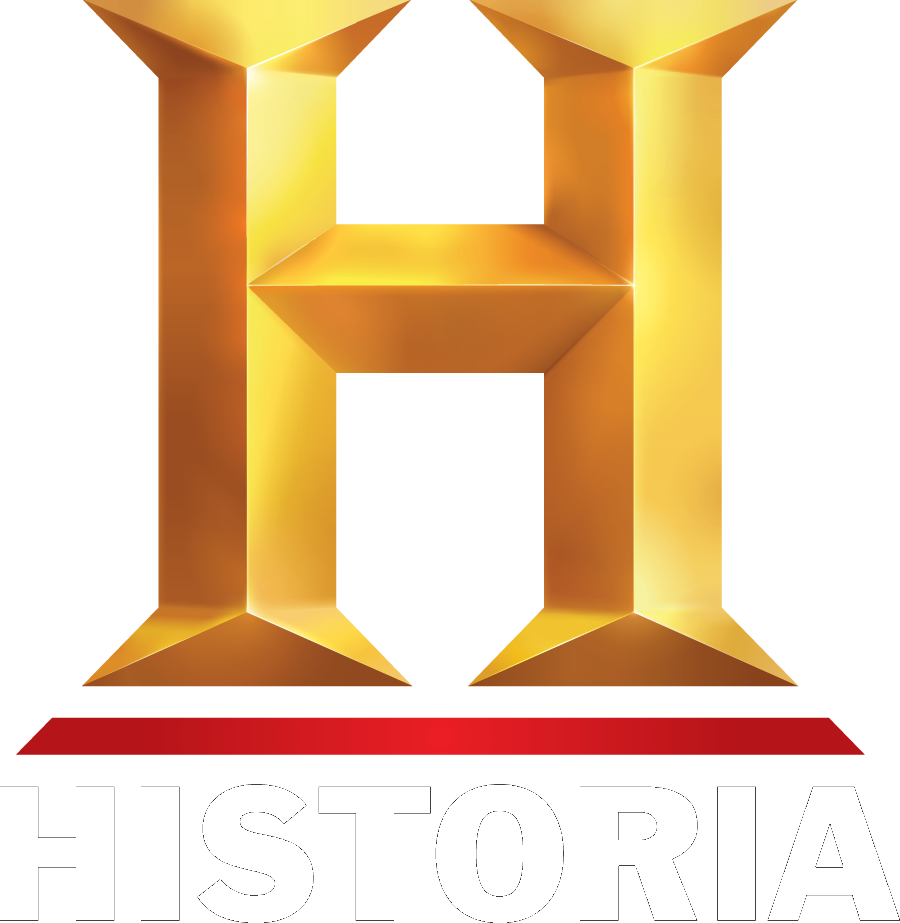
- Canal História
- Broadcast area: Portugal; Angola; Mozambique; Cape Verde
- Headquarters: Madrid, Spain

Programming
- Picture format: 16:9 576i (SDTV)

Ownership
- Owner: The History Channel Iberia (A&E Networks/ AMC Iberia)

History
- Launched: March 1999
- Former names: Canal de História, Canal História

Links
- Website: Canal História

Canal História, currently branded as História, is a Portuguese basic cable and satellite television channel that features history documentaries most of which are produced by History USA and Portuguese and Spanish historic productions, owned by the joint venture known as The History Channel Iberia, between A&E Networks and AMC Networks International Iberia. More recently, it started broadcast some reality television series. Initially it was a single Iberian channel founded by Multicanal (currently AMC Networks International Iberia) with feeds in Portuguese and Spanish. It was created in March 1999 and it split into different channels on 21 March 2012.

Some Portuguese historic productions airing in Canal História include Foz Côa about Coa Valley Prehistoric Rock Art, O Tratado de Tordesilhas about the Treaty of Tordesillas, Marquês de Pombal concerning Marquis of Pombal, Portugal e a NATO (Portugal and NATO) and A História Do Azulejo (History of Azulejo).
