= Blaze (British and Irish TV channel) =

British television channel owned by A+E

- Logo used since 2016
- Country: United Kingdom; Ireland

Programming
- Language: English
- Picture format: 576i (16:9 SDTV)
- Timeshift service: Blaze +1

Ownership
- Owner: A&E Networks
- Sister channels: List of Sky UK channels

History
- Launched: 20 September 2016; 10 years ago

Links
- Website: www.blaze.tv

Availability

Terrestrial
- Freeview: Channel 64; Channel 92 (+1)

Blaze is a British English-language free-to-air TV channel owned by Hearst Networks UK, a joint venture between A&E Networks and Sky Group. This channel allows UK A&E to use its programming for the complete "lifecycle".

A+E Networks Italy launched its Blaze on Sky Italy on March 22, 2017. In Spain and Portugal, a version of Blaze channel was launched by AMC Networks International in joint-venture with A&E Networks to replace the A&E channel on 18 April 2018, but closed and replaced with AMC Break on 19 April 2022. The Italian version of the channel was closed on 1 August 2023.

== Format and programming ==
The channels' programming is a best of A&E shows. Blaze was the first channel launched in the UK by A&E Networks that did not borrow its name from one of the company's U.S. channels. The abbreviation "A&E" is commonly used to mean "Accident and Emergency unit" in the UK, so the company decided not to use that brand for the channel.

Having originally only aired imported and rerun programming, Blaze commissioned its first original programme, Flipping Bangers, in 2017. It premiered on 6 April 2018 as a part of the Car Night programming block. The series has run for three seasons; a fourth was in talks but not yet announced as of November 2024.

== Staff ==
Elena Anniballi was appointed director of Blaze in April 2017. In February 2019, A&E Networks appointed Dan Korn as head of Blaze.

== Programmes ==
Initial programmes

- Pawn Stars (2016–)
- Mountain Men (2016–)
- American Restoration (2016–)

Exclusive A&E programming (April 2019—)

- Pawn Stars
- Storage Wars
- Counting Cars

Programmes from Sky History

- Britain's Greatest Obsessions with Harry Hill, Chris Packham and Suggs.
- Craig Charles: UFO Conspiracies

Programmes from other British broadcasters

- Britain's Most Historic Towns (Channel 4)
- Secrets of Great British Castles (Channel 5)

Original programming:

- Flipping Bangers (6 April 2018—) Just Might TV, Car Night programming block, two seasons
- Irish Pickers (2020-)
- Spiky Goldhunters Pango Productions
- Outback Truckers (seventh season—) Prospero Productions

== TCC and Blaze+1 ==
TCC was The Community Channel's licence bought by A&E Networks UK so that their channel Blaze would be listed higher up on the EPG and The Community Channel would end up lower down (under their new name Together TV). TCC and sister channel Blaze+1 were a couple of part-time services slots hoarded by A&E Networks, which broadcast shows from Blaze for a couple of hours each night after the main channel had shut down. In May 2024, That’s Media acquired the TCC Broadcasting broadcast licence and its EPG slot from A+E Networks UK, so that it could launch That’s Memories.

== Online ==
In addition to providing on-demand access to programming screened on Blaze, the Blaze website and apps also provide access to five free ad-supported streaming television channels operated by Hearst Networks; these channels are also available through third-party TV and streaming platforms such as Samsung TV Plus, Rakuten TV and Virgin Media The FAST channels operated by Hearst Networks comprise:

- Deal Masters featuring shows relating to trading and pawnbroking;
- History Hunters featuring history-themed programming, including content previously aired on Sky History;
- Inside Crime featuring true-crime documentaries, including content earlier screened on Crime+Investigation;
- Mystery TV featuring content relating to the paranormal and unexplained;
- World War TV featuring content relating to warfare and military history.
