= Crime & Investigation (Europe, Middle East and Africa) =

Television channel

- Logo used since 2019
- Country: United Kingdom
- Broadcast area: Benelux; Ireland; Middle East; Africa; Central and Eastern Europe

Programming
- Languages: Estonian English; German; Italian; Spanish; Portuguese (subtitles); Dutch (subtitles); Lithuanian (subtitles); Norwegian (subtitles); Swedish; Polish; Hungarian; Romanian (subtitles); Bulgarian (subtitles); Croatian (subtitles); Slovene (subtitles); Turkish; Arabic
- Picture format: 1080i HDTV
- Timeshift service: Crime & Investigation +1

Ownership
- Owner: A&E Networks UK (A&E Networks/Sky Group)

History
- Launched: 10 July 2006; 20 years ago
- Closed: April 19, 2022 (Portugal and Spain); November 1, 2023 (Italy); October 31, 2019 (Africa)
- Replaced by: AMC Crime (Portugal and Spain); Sky Crime (Italy); CBS Justice (Africa)

Links
- Website: www.crimeandinvestigation.eu

Availability

Terrestrial
- Zuku TV (Kenya): Channel 418

Streaming media
- Sky Go: Sky (UK & Ireland only)
- Virgin TV Anywhere: Virgin Media (UK only)
- BT TV Everywhere: BT TV (UK only)
- Ziggo GO (Netherlands): ZiggoGO.tv (Europe only)

Crime & Investigation, stylized as Crime + Investigation, is the television channel feed of the eponymous American channel owned by A&E Networks broadcast in most of Europe, the Middle East and Africa. Based in England in the United Kingdom, it is owned by A&E Networks UK (a joint venture of A&E Networks and Sky Group). The channel primarily broadcasts true crime programming and edits European versions of the original Crime & Investigation channel in the U.S.

TVT Media is responsible for the signal distribution across mainland Europe, and local subsidiaries of A&E Networks are the distribution representatives across Europe.

In Spain, it launched on 1 February 2011 replacing Buzz Negro and was named Crimen + Investigación, and it expanded in Portugal in 2016 as Crime + Investigation and it was operated by AMC Networks International Southern Europe, initially under the joint-venture The History Channel Iberia with A&E Networks/Hearst until 2021. The Portuguese version also aired in Portuguese-speaking African countries (Angola and Mozambique). They were rebranded as AMC Crime on 19 April 2022.

Its programming is mainly in English and locally subtitled or dubbed. It is available through numerous satellite, cable, terrestrial and IPTV distributors across Europe, the Middle East and Africa.

== History ==
A high definition version launched on Sky UK and Sky Ireland on 5 November 2008. Crime+Investigation HD originally operated on a separate schedule to the standard definition channel and timeshared with Bio. HD. On 3 July 2012, Bio. HD closed to allow Crime + Investigation HD to broadcast 24 hours a day, simulcasting the standard definition channel.

A one-hour timeshift channel named CI +1 launched on Sky UK on 2 March 2009. Since the rebranding in January 2017, this has been named Crime+Investigation +1 and is on Sky channel 256.

The channel launched in the Netherlands in July 2011. Followed by Romania through UPC Romania on 2 September 2013 and Italy through Sky Italia on 17 December 2013.

The French channel Planète+ Justice was rebranded as Planète+ Crime&Investigation on 13 November 2013, in a partnership between Groupe Canal+ and A&E Networks. The co-branding was dropped on 17 February 2022 when it renamed to Planète+ Crime.

The network launched on BT TV on 15 August 2013 and TalkTalk in the UK on 28 August 2014. It is on the Entertainment Extra Boost along with History.

The HD channel launched on Virgin Media channel 222 in the UK on 21 July 2018. At the same time, the timeshift channel also launched on there on channel 224.

On 6 November 2018, the European Commission ordered A&E Networks UK to divest its factual channels, as a condition of Disney's acquisition of 21st Century Fox.

It was announced on 1 October 2019 that the channel, along with Sister channels, History and Lifetime would no longer be packaged by MultiChoice's DStv across Africa by the end of October, 2019 after its carriage contract broke down between the A+E Networks and MultiChoice. but since they reached carriage agreement with Multichoice and A+E Networks, History and Lifetime are kept, but Crime+Investigation was dropped from the platform.
