= Odisea (TV channel) =

Documentary cable channel

Odisea/Odisseia
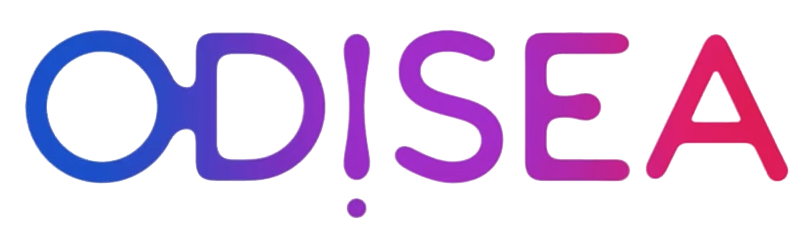
- Type: Cable and satellite television
- Branding: Odisea/Odisseia
- Country: Spain and Portugal
- Availability: Spain, Portugal, Andorra and Gibraltar
- Owner: AMC Networks International Iberia
- Launch date: 1996
- Picture format: 16:9 (576i, SDTV)
- Official website: www.odisea-odisseia.com

Odisseia
- Broadcast area: Portugal; Angola; Mozambique; Cape Verde
- Headquarters: Lisbon, Portugal

Programming
- Picture format: 16:9 576i (SDTV)

Ownership
- Owner: AMC Networks International Iberia
- Sister channels: AMC; Canal Hollywood; Canal Panda; Panda Kids; VinTV; Canal História; A&E; Sundance Channel

History
- Launched: 1996; March 1, 2011 (independent feed)

Links
- Website: Canal Odisseia

Odisea (Spanish) or Odisseia (Portuguese; also known as Canal Odisseia) is a documentary cable channel available in Spain and Portugal, with feeds in Portuguese or Spanish. It split into versions, and the Portuguese channel Odisseia became also available in Angola, Mozambique and Cape Verde. It is the oldest and one of the most notable of the genre in Portugal and, for most of its history, it was a single Iberian channel for Portugal and Spain with feeds in Portuguese to Portugal in a list of notable channels owned by Multicanal (currently AMC Networks International Iberia), including some of the oldest and most popular cable channels such as Canal Hollywood and Canal Panda.

Canal Odisseia, literally translating as Odyssey Channel, features various documentaries by the BBC, Granada Television, European, American and local productions, dedicated to nature, science, people and arts. It competes with other widely available cable channels, the Discovery Channel and National Geographic Channel.

The first Portuguese-made documentary, a documentary about the Alqueva Dam produced by Sulmedia and broadcast as part of the Contrastes series, aired on January 7, 2002.

Owned by AMC Networks International Iberia, Odisea was founded in 1996, and was one of the first ever Iberian cable channels. It presents various documentaries by BBC and Granada Television.

Odisea merged its output with that of its competitor Documania.

On March 1, 2011, Odisseia premiered a new logo, borrowed from sister operation Spektrum in the Czech Republic, Slovakia and Hungary, as well as an independent feed for Portugal.

Coinciding with its twentieth anniversary, in May 2016, the channel presented a new graphic identity and a new three-tone logo in blue, purple and red, as well as new programs and the ability of producing content in 4K.

== See also ==
- Canal Hollywood
- AMC Networks International Iberia
- Canal Panda
