= Telecable =

Spain telecommunications company

- Company type: Sociedad anónima
- Industry: Telecommunications
- Founded: 1995
- Headquarters: Scientific and Technology Park of Gijón, Asturias (headquarters); Oviedo, Asturias (registered office)
- Products: Broadband Internet access, mobile phone, digital TV
- Owner: Euskaltel
- Website: www.telecable.es

This is about the Spanish company. For Telecable, the Canadian company that operated out of Saskatchewan from the 1970s to the 1990s, see its successor company, Shaw Communications.

Telecable is a cable company that operates in Asturias (northern Spain) offering triple play services (telephone, Internet and television) as well as mobile phone services as an MVNO since 2007.

== History ==
The company started out as Telecable de Oviedo, Telecable de Gijón and Telecable de Avilés in 1995. In December 1998 it is given a license to work in all Asturias. From 2011, it started deploying a fiber network infrastructure in another Spanish region, Extremadura.

In 2015 the company was acquired by Zegona Communications plc for a sum of 640 million euros.

In October 2017, it was announced that Euskaltel had reached an agreement with Zegona to purchase its Asturian subsidiary Telecable for an amount of 686 million euros, which could be increased to 701 million euros.

In 2019, after the acquisition of R (R Cable y Telecomunicaciones Galicia, S.A.U.) and Telecable (Telecable de Asturias, S.A.U.) by Euskaltel, the first company merged with the second through absorption, forming a new entity named R Cable y Telecable Telecomunicaciones, S.A.U.

== See also ==
- Cogent Communications
- Euskaltel — Basque telecommunications company, owner of Telecable
- Tata Communications
- R — Galician telecommunications company, also subsidiary of Euskaltel
