= Euskaltel =

Spanish telecommunications company

Euskaltel, S.A.
- Euskaltel's current logo since 26 March 2018
- Company type: Sociedad Anónima
- Industry: Telecommunications
- Founded: July 3, 1995
- Headquarters: Derio, Biscay, Spain
- Area served: Basque Country
- Key people: Alberto García Erauzkin, Chairman
- Services: Broadband Internet, mobile telephony, fixed-line telephone, Digital television, IOT
- Owner: Grupo MasMovil
- Number of employees: 346 (2015)
- Subsidiaries: R Cable (100%); Telecable (100%)
- Website: euskaltel.com

Euskaltel, S.A. is a Spanish telecommunications company based in Derio, Basque Country. It was formed in 1995 in a joint effort by the Basque Government and several Basque saving banks. Its name is literally translated in English as "Basque-Tel". During the Christmas of 2006, Euskaltel became rebranded as euskaltel and were at the same time adopting a new logo which depicts a stylized orange-coloured butterfly.

Euskatel operates a fibre optics network within the region, laid in collaboration with the Basque gas company. The company uses the small nearby town of Urnietatel as a testing ground.

== Logo history ==
=== 2006–2018 ===
Euskaltel's second and previous logo used from 10 December 2006 to 25 March 2018.

=== 2018–present ===
Euskaltel's third and current logo since 26 March 2018.

== Mobile virtual network operator ==
Although Euskaltel has its own cable network, it does not have a licence to use mobile phone aerials. The company has agreements with Orange España, to use their aerials for their mobile phone service. Previously it had an agreement with Vodafone to provide their service.

== Corporate sponsorship ==
Euskaltel was the joint lead sponsor of the Basque Country's major professional cycling team, Euskaltel–Euskadi, along with the regional government. The team, once one of eighteen elite teams making up the UCI ProTour, was a regular participant in the annual Tour de France and Vuelta a España, and has helped to launch the careers of many top Basque professional cyclists such as Iban Mayo and Haimar Zubeldia.

In February 2020, it was announced that Euskaltel would sponsor the Fundación–Orbea team for four years, starting from the following April, with the team rebranding as Euskaltel–Euskadi.
