= History (European TV channel) =

European worldwide television channel

- Country: Germany; Italy; Netherlands; Portugal; Spain; United Kingdom; Romania
- Broadcast area: Balkans; Baltics; Benelux; Central Europe & Eastern Europe; CIS; Iberian Peninsula; Iceland; Ireland; Israel; Scandinavia; South Africa
- Headquarters: Hammersmith, London (UK and Pan-Europe); Munich (Germany, Austria & Switzerland); Rome (Italy & San Marino); Amsterdam (Netherlands & Flanders); Madrid (Spain & Portugal)

Programming
- Languages: English; German; Italian; Spanish; Portuguese; Swedish; Polish; Czech; Hungarian; Russian; Norwegian (subtitles); Danish (subtitles); Dutch (subtitles); Estonian (subtitles); Latvian (subtitles); Romanian (subtitles); Bulgarian (subtitles); Serbian (subtitles); Croatian (subtitles); Slovene (subtitles)
- Picture format: 1080i HDTV (downscaled to 16:9 576i for the SDTV feed)

Ownership
- Owner: Hearst Networks UK (Hearst Networks UK)/Sky Group)
- Sister channels: List of Sky UK channels

History
- Launched: 1 November 1995; 31 years ago
- Former names: The History Channel (1995–2008); History (2000–2020, UK & Ireland)

Links
- Website: www.history.com; history.co.uk; canalhistoria.es; www.hearstnetworks.com

Availability

Terrestrial
- Sky (United Kingdom): Channel 123 (Sky History HD); Channel 821 (Sky History)
- DStv (Sub-Saharan Africa): Channel 186 (HD)
- Zuku TV (Kenya): Channel 412
- AzamTV (Africa): Channel 191

History (known as Sky History in the UK and Ireland) is a European documentary television network which broadcasts programs related to historical events and persons. There are also reality television, ufology and paranormal programs.

It is a joint venture between Hearst Networks UK and Sky Group with localized channels across Europe. TVT Media is responsible for signal distribution in Europe, with local subsidiaries of A&E Networks as distribution representatives on the continent.

Programming across the channels is primarily in English and where available subtitled or dubbed into regional languages. The channel is available through a number of satellite, cable, terrestrial and IPTV distributors across Europe, the Middle East and South Africa. In some countries, advertisements and announcements between programs are localized.

On 6 November 2018, in the wake of the Disney-Fox merger, the European Commission required The Walt Disney Company to sell A&E's European channels, including History.

History has separate versions for Germany, Italy, the Netherlands, Spain and Portugal:

- History Germany: Operated by A&E Networks Germany.
- History Italy: Formerly a joint venture of A&E Networks and Fox International Channels Italy, it became a sole venture of A&E Networks in 2012.
- History Netherlands, airing in the Netherlands and Flanders. Operated by A&E Networks Benelux.
- Canal Historia (also known as História): Operated by AMC Networks International Southern Europe.
- History Poland - launched on 9 April 2008.

== Sky History (UK and Ireland) ==
The History Channel UK launched on 1 November 1995 on the Sky Multichannels service, broadcasting on weekdays from 4:00pm-8:00pm, timesharing on the Astra satellite with Sky Travel, Sky Soap and the Sci-Fi Channel. The channel's schedule consisted of three different shows - Biography (restyled for a British audience), History Alive and Our Century. It operated as a joint-venture between A&E Television Networks and British Sky Broadcasting, and was A&E's first international venture. The channel was also made available on cable providers.

In late-1997, Sky Sports 2, which had broadcast on the transponder at the weekend, extended its broadcast hours to include the entire day. Sky Travel also extended hours, leading to the remainder of the networks that broadcast on the transponder, including The History Channel, to move to transponder 24. On 1 November 1997, the channel was removed from Telewest's analogue cable service.

The launch of Sky Digital in October 1998 allowed the channel to significantly increase its broadcast hours and was soon broadcasting daily from 6am until midnight, with analogue hours extended in 1999 to 12noon to 8pm.

In May 2002, Telewest and The History Channel (UK) Limited failed to reach an agreement to broadcast the network, with Telewest announcing that they would remove the channel from their Active Digital cable service at the end of the month. On 1 June, the two companies successfully renegotiated and The History Channel was restored.

On 26 October 2006, History Channel HD launched in the United Kingdom and Ireland. The channel broadcasts content in 1080p HD, and operates on a separate schedule from the SD feed.

In November 2008 the History Channel was re-branded History,

The company behind the channel was known as The History Channel (UK) Limited until July 2009, when it was renamed AETN UK (a short form of "A&E Television Networks").

In 2010, History HD became a simulcast service.

On 22 September 2011, AETN UK was re-branded A&E Networks UK.

The channel launched on BT on 15 August 2013, and on TalkTalk on 28 August 2014.

Logo used from 2020 to 2024 in the United Kingdom

On 27 May 2020, History, History +1 and History 2 were renamed Sky History, Sky History +1, and Sky History 2 respectively, alongside the launch of Sky Documentaries and Sky Nature. The networks retained their strong ties with AETN, and the network's logos kept the network's insignia, being co-marketed with Sky. The network also took a new channel position, taking over one previously used by E!.

On 12 September 2024 AETN UK was renamed Hearst Networks UK.

Sky History 2 was rebranded as Mystery X from 29 September 2026.

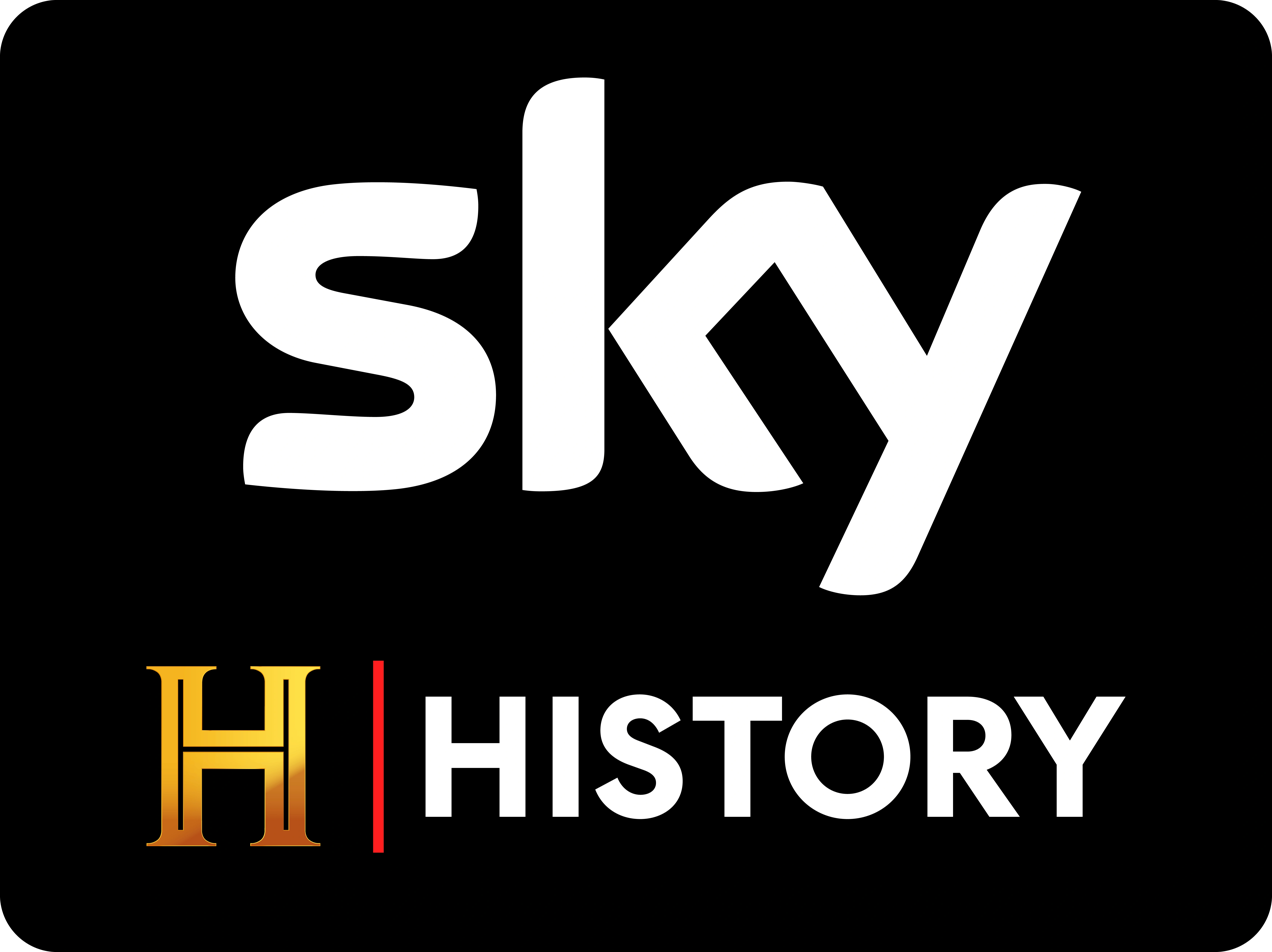
Logo used from 2026 in the United Kingdom

== Other International Territories ==
The HD version was launching across Europe from October 2007, beginning in the Nordic region on 13 December 2007, offering a schedule separate from the standard-definition version. In January 2008, History Channel HD launched in the Netherlands.

Like with the UK channel, the International networks were rebranded in November 2008. and the high-definition channel became History HD.

A+E Networks EMEA was renamed Hearst Networks EMEA on 12 September 2024.

== History Channel Iberia (Spain and Portugal) ==
História logo used in Spain and Portugal

Since 1998, History has been distributed under the name Canal Historia—and, more recently, Historia—in Spain and Portugal by AMC Networks International Southern Europe in a joint venture with A&E Networks (owner of History), called The History Channel Iberia. The channel has Spanish and Portuguese feeds with dubbed English programs and locally produced programming. On 14 June 2021 AMC Networks acquires full ownership of its Spanish channels, including Canal Historia.

Canal Historia is available in Spain on Movistar+, cable networks (Telecable, R, Euskaltel), IPTV providers (Vodafone, Orange TV) and streaming media (TotalChannel). Historia HD became available in Spain on 3 November 2015. In Portugal, História is available through cable providers (NOS, Cabovisão) and IPTV (MEO, Vodafone).

=== Spanish locally produced programming ===
- Arqueólogo Por Un Día (2015), where a local celebrity spends a day working with archaeologists on an excavation
- La Última Cena (2014–2015)

=== Portuguese local-history programming ===
- Combatentes do Ultramar (2003), dedicated to the Portuguese Colonial War
- A Última Ceia (2014–2015)

== History Scandinavia ==
The History Channel began in Scandinavia in September 1997, broadcasting for three hours daily on the analogue Viasat platform. Initially time-sharing with TV1000 Cinema, it was later moved to the Swedish TV8 channel until November 2004 (when Viasat launched Viasat History).

== History Germany ==
In German-speaking countries, History is operated by History Channel Germany, which was a joint venture of A&E Networks and NBC Universal Global Networks Germany. The channel began as the History Channel on 15 November 2004, and changed its name to History on 11 January 2009. Since 1 June 2017 the channel is fully owned by A&E Networks Germany.

History is available on the Kabel Deutschland, Kabel BW-Unitymedia, Primacom and KabelKiosk cable networks in all German states, and is also available on cable in Austria and Switzerland. Although the channel was available on satellite on Arena, it was not available on Premiere until the latter was renamed Sky on 4 July 2009. At that time, History HD (a high-definition version of the channel) was introduced. The channel hosts the annual History Award, which has been given since 2005.

== History Netherlands and Flanders ==
History Channel launched in the Netherlands and Flanders on 1 May 2007.

RTL Nederland (now Ad Alliance) became responsible for advertising sales on 1 January 2016. On 15 January 2021 Belgian provider Telenet moved the channel from their premium packages to the basic subscription. One day later, their subsidiary SBS Belgium announced they would handle Belgian advertising sales for the channel starting 1 February 2021.
