= Sol Música =

Spanish online music video brand

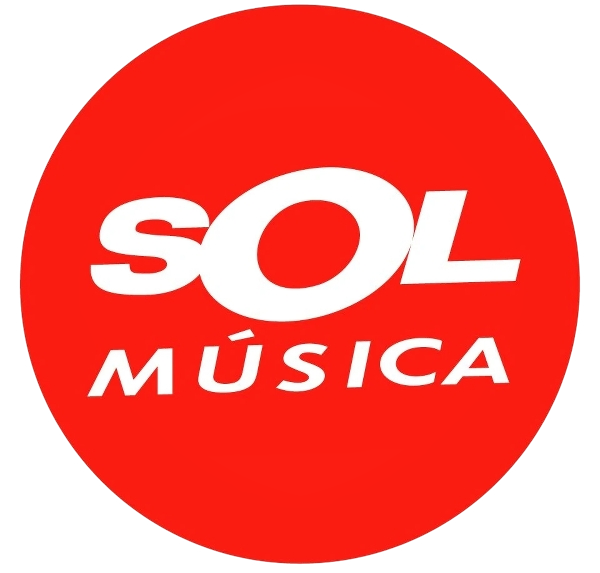
- Country: Spain
- Broadcast area: Spain; Portugal; Andorra; Gibraltar

Programming
- Picture format: 16:9 576i (SDTV); 16:9 1080i (HDTV)

Ownership
- Owner: AMC Networks International Iberia (Spain)

History
- Launched: July 1, 1997

Sol Música is a Spanish online music video brand and former linear television channel owned by AMC Networks.

It started broadcasting to Spain and Portugal on July 1, 1997, replacing the Latin niche music channel HTV, produced by Claxson, on cable networks in both countries. In 1999, coinciding with a rebrand, the Portuguese feed of the channel split from the Spanish version, and by March 2000, had increased its ratings in Portugal alone by 70%.

In October 2004, TV Cabo announced that it would cease analog broadcasting Sol Música in favor of an Iberian version of The Biography Channel, which was a response to a planned TVI music channel which never materialized. It was initially suggested that Sol Música would move entirely to digital cable. Later the channel was set to leave Portuguese cable networks on January 1, 2005 with the channel permanently switched off on January 10, 2005.

In December 2012, Sol Música launched an official YouTube channel with footage from its archives. In May 2013, its content was added to Canal+ Yomvi.

On March 29, 2023, it was announced that Sol Música would close on April 13, being replaced by ¡Buen Viaje!, a travel channel. A few months later, in late August, AMC announced the revival as a FAST channel, AMC's first in Spain.
