= Canal Hollywood =

Television channel in Spain and Portugal

- Country: Spain; Portugal
- Broadcast area: Spain, Portugal, Andorra, Cape Verde

Programming
- Picture format: 16:9 576i (SDTV); 16:9 1080i (HDTV)

Ownership
- Owner: AMC Networks International Iberia (Spain); Dreamia (Portugal)

History
- Launched: December 20, 1993

Links
- Website: https://canalhollywood.pt/

Canal Hollywood is a movie cable channel available in Spain, and Portugal. Canal Hollywood was founded in 1993, and was one of the first Iberian cable channels ever. It presents movies by all of the major studios.

In 2011, it became available in HD in Spain and Portugal. Initially it was a single channel airing for all Iberia, but in 2015 the Spanish and Portuguese channels became independent.

The Portuguese channel was taken over by Dreamia (AMC Networks International Iberia and NOS) in 2009, and is one of the most successful cable channels in Portugal, constantly hitting the top 10 most viewed channels in the country on a monthly basis, and usually surpassing RTP2 ratings. It also became available via cable, satellite or IPTV in Angola, Mozambique and Cape Verde.

== See also ==
- Odisea
- AMC Networks International Iberia
