= List of UEFA Champions League broadcasters =

This is a list of television broadcasters which provide coverage of the UEFA Champions League, European football's top level continental competition, and other UEFA clubs’ competitions like the UEFA Europa League and the UEFA Women's Champions League, as well as the UEFA Super Cup. Starting from the 2021–22 season, during the group stage, two matches per day will kick off at 18:45 CET/CEST (instead of 18:55 previously), and all matches from round of 16 until the final will continue to kick-off at 21:00 CET/CEST. Additionally, from the 2024/25 season, one match per day of the knockout playoffs and round of 16 will start at 18:45 CET/CEST.

UEFA sells the broadcast rights in a three-season basis and various packages are available for bidders, with UEFA weighing balance between free and pay television under the UEFA and European Union (EU) agreement. While balancing between free and pay television, if the rights do not sell within "sales windows", the rights may be sold on an individual basis to pay-per-view television broadcasters.

UEFA only markets the media rights to the last qualifying phase, group stages and final phase of the Champions League. The national associations, their affiliated organisations or clubs market the commercial rights to the first three qualifying phases.

The 2009 final attracted an audience of 109 million people around the world, a record number for the competition, and replaced the Super Bowl as the most-watched annual sports event.

== List of broadcasters ==
=== Men's competition ===
==== 2024-27 ====
Territory	Rights holder	Ref
Albania	Top Channel; Tring Sport	
Armenia	Fast Sports	
Australia	Stan Sport	
Austria	Sky Sport (Note: Include exclusive broadcast of UEFA Super Cup and final); Canal+ (Note: First pick Wednesday match)	
Azerbaijan	CBC Sport; İTV; SportTV	
Bangladesh	tapmad	
Belarus	Sport TV; Okko	
Belgium	RTL/VTM; Proximus; Play Sports	
Bosnia and Herzegovina	Arena Sport	
Brazil	TNT Sports; SBT (Note: First pick Tuesday match co-exclusive)	
Brunei	beIN Sports	
Bulgaria	bTV; Max Sport	
Cambodia	beIN Sports	
Cameroon	CRTV	
Canada	DAZN; OneSoccer	
Caribbean	Rush Sports	
Central America	ESPN	
China	iQIYI	
Croatia	HRT; Arena Sport	
Cyprus	CYTA	
Czech Republic	Nova Sport	
Denmark	Viaplay	
Dominican Republic	Antena 7	
Estonia	Go3 Sport	
Finland	MTV	
France (Note: Including Monaco)	Canal+; M6 (Note: Only final (co-exclusively))	
Georgia	Setanta Sports; Silk Sport	
Germany	DAZN; Prime Video (Note: First pick Tuesday match); ZDF (Note: Only highlights & Final)	
Gibraltar	Gibtelecom	
Greece	MEGA; Magenta Sport	
Haiti	Canal+	
Hong Kong	beIN Sports	
Hungary	RTL; Sport1	
Iceland	Sýn; Viaplay	
Indian subcontinent	Sony Sports Network	
Indonesia	beIN Sports; Emtek	
Ireland	RTÉ; Premier Sports; Virgin Media; TNT Sports; Prime Video	
Israel	Sports Channel	
Italy (Note: Including San Marino and Vatican City)	Sky Sport; Prime Video	
Ivory Coast	NCI	
Jamaica	TVJ	
Japan	WOWOW	
Kazakhstan	Qazsport; Q Sport	
Kosovo	RTK; ArtMotion	
Kyrgyzstan	Q Sport	
Laos	beIN Sports	
Latvia	Go3 Sport	
Lithuania	Go3 Sport	
Luxembourg	RTL; Proximus	
Macau	TDM	
Malaysia	beIN Sports	
Malta	PBS; TSN	
Mauritius	MBC	
MENA	beIN Sports	
Mexico	Fox; TNT Sports	
Moldova	Jurnal TV; Setanta Sports; WESport TV	
Mongolia	PSN	
Montenegro	Arena Sport	
Myanmar	Canal+	
Netherlands	Ziggo Sport	
New Zealand	DAZN	
North Macedonia	Arena Sport	
Norway	TV2	
Pacific Islands	Digicel	
Papua New Guinea	Digicel	
Pakistan	tapmad	
Poland	TVP; Canal+	
Philippines	beIN Sports	
Portugal	DAZN; Sport TV; LiveModeTV (Note: only in 2026–2027, one match per round licensed by DAZN)	(Note: livemode)
Romania	Digi Sport; Prima Sport	
Russia	Okko	
Saint Lucia	Winners Sports TV	
Serbia	RTS; Arena Sport	
Singapore	beIN Sports	
Slovakia	Nova Sport	
Slovenia	Pro Plus; Sport Klub	
South America	ESPN	
South Korea	SPOTV	
Spain (Note: Including Andorra)	Movistar Plus+	
Sub-Saharan Africa	SuperSport; Canal+ Afrique; New World TV	
Suriname	ATV	
Sweden	Viaplay	
Switzerland (Note: Including Liechtenstein)	SRG SSR; Blue Sport	
Taiwan	ELTA	
Tajikistan	Varzish TV	
Thailand	beIN Sports	
Timor Leste	beIN Sports	
Türkiye	TRT	
Ukraine	Megogo	
United Kingdom	TNT Sports; Prime Video; BBC (Note: Only highlights)	
United States	Skydance; TelevisaUnivision; DAZN	
Uzbekistan	Zo'r TV	
Vietnam	VTVcab (Note: All but matches held exclusively by Viettel, including semi-finals and final); Viettel (Note: 74 selected top matches (including playoffs))	

==== 2027–2031 ====
Territory	Rights holder	Ref
Albania	Tring Sport	
Australia	DAZN	
Austria	DAZN; Sky Sport; Puls 4	
Belgium	Canal+	
Brazil	TNT Sports	
Bulgaria	Max Sport	
Canada	Paramount+	
China	iQIYI	
Denmark	Viaplay	
Finland	Nelonen Media	
France	Canal+; TF1	
Georgia	Silk Sport	
Germany	Paramount+; Prime Video	
Hungary	RTL	
Ireland	RTÉ (Note: First pick Wednesday match co-exclusive) (Note: final co-exclusively); Premier Sports; Paramount+ (Note: Co-exclusive rights); Sky Sports; Prime Video	
Israel	DAZN	
Italy	Sky Sport; Prime Video	
Japan	WOWOW	
Kosovo	Artmotion	
Latin America	ESPN; Paramount+	
Moldova	Clever Media	
Mongolia	Premier Sports Network	
Netherlands	Ziggo Sport	
New Zealand	Disney+	
Norway	TV2	
Poland	Canal+	
Portugal	DAZN; Sport TV; LiveModeTV	
Romania	Digi Sport	
South Korea	Coupang Play	
Spain	Movistar Plus+; RTVE	
Sub-Saharan Africa	SuperSport; Canal+ Afrique	
Sweden	Disney+	
Switzerland	Blue Sport; Canal+ (Note: One match per day in French Switzerland)	
Thailand	AIS Play	
Türkiye	Acun Medya	
United Kingdom	Skydance; Prime Video	
United States	Skydance; Telemundo	
Vietnam	Vietcontent	

== Other clubs’ competitions ==
==== Europa League & Conference League ====
Territory	Rights holder	Ref
Australia	Disney+	
Austria	Canal+	
Belgium	Canal+	
Brazil	ESPN; Disney+	
Canada	Paramount+	
Denmark	Disney+	
Finland	Viaplay	
France	Canal+	
Germany	DAZN	
Italy	Sky Sport	
Latin America	ESPN; Disney+	
New Zealand	Disney+	
Norway	Viaplay	
Poland	Polsat	
Portugal	DAZN	
Spain	Movistar Plus+	
Sweden	Disney+	
Switzerland	DAZN; Canal+	
United Kingdom and Ireland	Sky Sports	
United States	Paramount+	

=== Women's competition ===
==== 2025–2030 ====
===== UEFA =====
Disney+ acquired rights across multiple European territories. In these territories, limited coverage is also available with free-to-air and pay TV broadcasters:

Territory	Rights holder	Ref
Andorra	RTVE; TV3	
Armenia	AMPTV	
Austria	ORF	
Belgium	RTBF; VRT	
Croatia	HRT	
Cyprus	Cablenet Sports	
Czech Republic	ČT	
Denmark	DR	
Finland	Yle	
France	L'Équipe	
Germany	ZDF	
Greece	Mega TV	
Hungary	MTVA	
Iceland	RÚV	
Ireland	RTÉ	
Israel	One	
Kazakhstan	Q Sport	
Liechtenstein	SRG SSR	
Malta	PBS	
Netherlands	NOS	
Norway	NRK; TV 2	
Portugal	RTP	
Serbia	RTS	
Slovakia	STVR	
Spain	RTVE; TV3	
Sweden	TV4	
Switzerland	SRG SSR	
Türkiye	TRT	
Ukraine	Suspilne; Maincast	
United Kingdom	BBC	

===== outside UEFA =====
All live matches are available on UEFA.tv in territories with no broadcast deal.

Territory	Rights holder	Ref
Australia	ESPN	
Brazil	ESPN	
Brunei	beIN Sports (Note: rights until 2026-27 only)	
Cambodia	beIN Sports	
Canada	OneSoccer	
Caribbean	ESPN	
Central America	ESPN	
China	iQIYI	
Ghana	Sporty TV	
Hong Kong	beIN Sports	
India	FanCode	
Indonesia	beIN Sports	
Japan	WOWOW (Note: Broadcast deal begins from the quarter-final phase of this season, and all phases starting from the 2026-27 season.)	
Kenya	Sporty TV	
Laos	beIN Sports	
Malaysia	beIN Sports	
MENA	beIN Sports	
Mexico	TVC Deportes	
New Zealand	ESPN	
Nigeria	Sporty TV	
Pacific Islands	ESPN	
Papua New Guinea	ESPN	
Philippines	beIN Sports	
Singapore	beIN Sports	
South Africa	Sporty TV	
South America	ESPN	
Sub-Saharan Africa	ESPN	
Thailand	beIN Sports	
Timor Leste	beIN Sports	
United States	CBS Sports; ESPN Deportes	
