= List of satellite television companies =

This is a list of satellite television providers, operating around the world.

== Africa ==
=== Angola ===
- DStv - under MultiChoice, DStv Bué
- UAU!TV
- ZAP TV

=== Ivory Coast ===
- Canal+ Afrique
  - Easy TV Ivory Coast - under Canal+
- DStv - under MultiChoice, DStv French Plus
- StarTimes - French & English

=== East Africa ===
- Azam TV - under Bakhresa Group
- Continental, Agape and Ting
- Canal+ Afrique
- DStv - under MultiChoice
- Orange (company) - bought by Canal+ in 2023
- PremiumFree - free-to-air
- StarTimes
- TPS - merged into Canalsat in 2008
- Zuku TV - under (Wananchi Group)

=== Ethiopia ===
- Canal+ Ethiopia - shut down in 2024
- DStv - under MultiChoice
- StarTimes

=== Ghana ===
- Crystal TV - digital terrestrial
- DStv - under MultiChoice
  - GOtv Ghana
- Multi TV - multichannel free-to-air
- RCS - multichannel free-to-air
- StarTimes - digital terrestrial

=== Middle East and North Africa ===
- beIN
- My-HD
- Orbit - merged into OSN in 2009
- OSN
- Showtime - merged into OSN in 2009

=== Mozambique ===
- Canal+ Reunion
- DStv - under MultiChoice, DStv Bué
  - GOtv Moçambique
- StarTimes - under TMT Moçambique
- UAU!TV
- ZAP TV

=== Namibia ===
- DStv - under MultiChoice
  - GOtv Namibia
- PremiumFree - free-to-air
- Satelio
- StarSat (On Digital Media) - under StarTimes

=== Nigeria ===
- African Cable Television - commenced operations on 1 December 2014; operations were discontinued a few months later
- CTL
- Daarsat
- DStv - under MultiChoice - Other networks like HiTV (out of operations) and StarTimes have increased the competitiveness of the cable TV market.
  - GOtv Nigeria
- KAFTAN TV
- Kwese TV - discontinued its DTH operation in 2019
- Metro Digital
- Montage Cable Network - also commenced operations in 2014 but is no longer in operations
- Moreplex TV
- Mytv - discontinued 2021
- OurTV
- Play Consat
- Sairtek - a top broadcast service provider in Lagos; provides free-to-air broadcasting, live streaming, satellite, OTT and IPTV, distribution and contribution services
- StarTimes - DTT and DTH operator
- TrendTV
- TStv - was off air but back on air since October 2020 - discontinued

=== Réunion ===
- Canal+ Reunion
  - TNT Sat Reunion - under Canal+
- Orange Reunion - bought by Canal+ in 2023
- Parable Reunion

=== South Africa ===
- Deukom - under Satelio
- DStv - under MultiChoice
  - GOtv South Africa
- OpenView HD
- PremiumFree - free-to-air
- StarSat (On Digital Media) - under StarTimes TV (Defunct in 2024)
- ZapSat - under ZAP TV

=== Togo ===
- Canal+ Afrique
- DStv - under MultiChoice
- New World TV

=== Zambia ===
- DStv - under MultiChoice
  - GOtv Zambia
- Muvi TV
- PremiumFree - free-to-air
- Topstar Zambia - under StarTimes

== Asia ==
=== Afghanistan ===
- Oqaab

=== Bangladesh ===
- Akash Digital TV

=== Cambodia ===
- Cambodian DTV Network

=== India ===
- Airtel digital TV
- DD Free Dish
- Dish TV
- Sun Direct
- Tata Play

=== Indonesia ===
- Accola Play
- K-Vision
- MNC Vision
- Nex Parabola
- Transvision

=== Israel ===
- yes

=== Japan ===
- SKY PerfecTV!
- Wowow

=== Malaysia ===
- Astro
- MYTV Broadcasting DTH
- NJOI
- OK Vision

=== Mongolia ===
- DDishTV
- Mongolsat Networks

=== Myanmar ===
- Canal+ (Myanmar)
- Sky Net
- Myansat
- MRTV
- New Launch Star Time.Good TV.

=== Nepal ===
- DishHome
- Net TV Nepal

=== Pakistan ===
- MAG DTH
- ShahzadSky DTH
- StarTimes

Note: There is no DTH in Pakistan in 2025, DTH auction held in 2016. There are reports StarTimes withdraw application from DTH licence.

=== Philippines ===
- Cignal; SatLite
- G Sat
- Sky Direct

=== South Korea ===
- KT SkyLife

=== Sri Lanka ===
- Dialog TV
- Freesat

=== Thailand ===
- DTV
- GMM Z
- Good TV
- IPM TV
- PSI TV
- TrueVisions

=== Vietnam ===
- An Viên Television - (MobiTV)
- K+
- Vietnam Multimedia Corporation

== Oceania ==
=== Australia ===
- Foxtel
- Freeview
- VAST

=== New Caledonia ===
- Canal+ Calédonie

=== New Zealand ===
- Freeview
- SKY

=== Vanuatu ===
- Canal+ Calédonie

=== Wallis and Futuna ===
- Canal+ Calédonie

== Europe ==
=== Albania ===
- DigitAlb
- SAT+ - filed for bankruptcy in 2010
- Tring TV

=== Austria ===
- DF1 - merged into Premiere World in 1999
- Canal+ (Austria)
- HD Austria - sold to Canal+ in 2024
- Sky

=== Belgium ===
- Télésat
- TPS - filed for bankruptcy in 2008
- TV Vlaanderen

=== Bosnia and Herzegovina ===
- TotalTV

=== Bulgaria ===
- A1
- Bulsatcom
- neosat
- Vivacom

=== Croatia ===
- A1 (formerly Vipnet)
- Digi - merged into Vipnet in 2013)
- MAXtv
- TotalTV

=== Cyprus ===
- Cyta
- Nova Cyprus

=== Czech Republic ===
- Magenta TV Sat
- Skylink
- Telly (formerly Digi until 2015)

=== Denmark ===
- Allente
- Canal Digital - merged into Allente in 2021
- Viasat - merged into Allente in 2021

=== Estonia ===
- Home3 (formerly Viasat until 2018)

=== Finland ===
- Allente
- Canal Digital - merged into Allente in 2021
- Viasat - merged into Allente in 2021

=== France ===
- AB Sat - sold to Bis TV in 2008
- Bis TV
- Canal+
- Fransat
- Orange - bought by Canal+ in 2023
- TPS - merged into Canalsat in 2008

=== Georgia ===
- MagtiCom

=== Germany ===
- DF1 - merged into Premiere World in 1999
- Diveo - sold to M7 in 2019
- HD+
- Sky Deutschland

=== Greece ===
- Magenta TV (Formerly Cosmote TV)
- Nova

=== Hungary ===
- Direct One - merged into One Hungary in 2025)
- One Hungary (formerly Digi until 2025)
- Telekom

=== Ireland ===
- Sky

=== Italy ===
- RaiSat - filed for bankruptcy in 2010
- Sky Italia
- Stream TV - merged into Sky in 2003
- Tele+ - merged into Sky in 2003
- Tivùsat

=== Latvia ===
- Home3 (formerly Viasat until 2018)

=== Lithuania ===
- Home3 (formerly Viasat until 2018)

=== Luxembourg ===
- Télésat

=== Montenegro ===
- M Sat TV
- TotalTV

=== Netherlands ===
- Canal Digitaal

=== North Macedonia ===
- Mtel
- TotalTV

=== Norway ===
- Allente
- Canal Digital - merged into Allente in 2021
- Viasat - merged into Allente in 2021

=== Poland ===
- Canal+
- n - merged into nc+ in 2013
- Orange
- Polsat Box
- Telewizja na kartę - sold to Smart HD+ in 2016
- Wizja TV - merged into Cyfra+ in 2002

=== Portugal ===
- MEO
- NOS

=== Romania ===
- Akta (formerly Max TV) - merged into Dolce in 2012
- Boom TV - merged into Dolce in 2012
- Digi
- Focus Sat
- Freesat
- Orange
- Telekom (formerly Dolce) - merged into Orange in 2022

=== Russia ===
- MTS
- NTV Plus
- Telekarta
- Tricolor TV

=== Serbia ===
- Digi) (merged into mts in 2018)
- mts
- TotalTV

=== Slovakia ===
- Antik Sat
- Digi (merged into Magio Sat in 2017)
- Magio Sat
- Skylink

=== Slovenia ===
- TotalTV no longer exits in slovenia
- telemach slovenia

=== Spain ===
- Canal+ - merged into Movistar+ in 2015
- Movistar Plus+
- Via Digital - merged into Digital+ in 2003

=== Sweden ===
- Allente
- Canal Digital - merged into Allente in 2021
- Viasat - merged into Allente in 2021

=== Switzerland ===
- Canal+
- DF1 - merged into Premiere World in 1999
- Kabelio
- Orange - bought by Canal+ in 2023
- RaiSat - filed for bankruptcy in 2010
- Sky
- Stream TV - merged into Sky in 2003
- Tele+ - merged into Sky in 2003
- TPS - merged into Canalsat in 2008

=== Turkey ===
- D-Smart
- Digiturk
- Tivibu

=== Ukraine ===
- Ukrkosmos
- Viasat
- Xtra TV - filed for bankruptcy

=== United Kingdom ===
- Freeview; Freesat
- Sky

== Americas ==
=== Argentina ===
- DirecTV

=== Bolivia ===
- Tuves

=== Brazil ===
- Claro TV
- Sky Brasil
- Vivo TV - shut down in 2022

=== Canada ===
- Bell Satellite TV
- Glorystar
- Shaw Direct
- Telus TV - sold to BCE in 2018

=== Chile ===
- Claro TV - merged with Tuves in 2024
- DirecTV
- Tuves

=== Colombia ===
- Claro TV
- DirecTV

=== Costa Rica ===
- Claro TV
- Sky México

=== Dominican Republic ===
- Claro TV
- Sky México

=== Ecuador ===
- Claro TV
- CNT TV
- DirecTV

=== El Salvador ===
- Claro TV
- Sky México

=== French Guiana ===
- Canal+ Caraïbes

=== Guadeloupe ===
- Canal+ Caraïbes

=== Guatemala ===
- Claro TV
- Sky México

=== Haïti ===
- Canal+ Haïti

=== Honduras ===
- Claro TV
- Sky México

=== Martinique ===
- Canal+ Caraïbes

=== Mexico ===
- Dish México
- Sky México
- StarTV México

=== Nicaragua ===
- Claro TV
- Sky México

=== Panama ===
- Claro TV
- Sky México

=== Paraguay ===
- Claro TV
- Tuves

=== Peru ===
- Claro TV
- DirecTV
- Tuves

=== Puerto Rico ===
- Claro TV
- DirecTV
- Dish Network
- Kiwisat

=== Saint Barthélemy ===
- Canal+ Caraïbes

=== Saint Martin ===
- Canal+ Caraïbes

=== United States ===
- AlphaStar - filed for bankruptcy in 1997
- DirecTV
- Dish Network
- Glorystar
- Orby TV - shut down in 2021
- Primestar - bought by DirecTV in 1999
- USSB - merged into DirecTV in 1999
- Unity Motion - went bankrupt in 2006
- Voom - sold to Dish in 2005

=== Uruguay ===
- DirecTV

=== Venezuela ===
- Inter
- Simpletv
