= Canal+ =

Canal+ may refer to:

== France ==
- Canal+ S.A., a French media and telecommunications conglomerate, whose corporate divisions include:
  - Canal+ (French TV channel), a French TV channel
  - Canal+ (French TV provider), formerly CanalSat, the subscription service associated with the TV channel, whose operations include:
    - Canal+ Afrique
    - Canal+ Calédonie
    - Canal+ Caraïbes
    - Canal+ Reunion
  - StudioCanal, formerly known as Canal+ D.A. and other names

== International versions ==
- Canal+ (Polish TV provider), an international version of Canal+ subscription service
- Canal+ (Spanish TV channel), a former Spanish commercial television channel (ended 2016)

== See also ==
- Canal+ (Myanmar)
- Canal+ Sport (French TV channel)
- Canal Digital, a pay TV and internet service provider in Norway, Sweden, Denmark and Finland
