= List of 2016 Summer Olympics broadcasters =

The 2016 Summer Olympics in Rio de Janeiro was televised by a number of broadcasters throughout the world. As with previous years, Olympic Broadcasting Services produced the world feed provision to local broadcasters for use in their coverage. In most regions, broadcast rights to the 2016 Summer Olympics were packaged together with those for the 2014 Winter Olympics, but some broadcasters obtained rights to further games as well.

== List of broadcasters ==
| Territory | Broadcaster | Ref |
|---|---|---|
| Afghanistan | RTA TV | |
| Albania | RTSH; SuperSport | |
| Algeria | EPTV | |
| Andorra | RTVE; France Télévisions | |
| Angola | TPA | |
| Antigua and Barbuda | ABS | |
| Argentina | TV Pública; TyC Sports | |
| Armenia | Armenia 1 | |
| Asia | Dentsu^{1} | |
| Australia | Seven Network | |
| Austria | ORF | |
| Azerbaijan | İTV | |
| Bahamas | ZNS | |
| Barbados | CBC | |
| Belarus | Belteleradio | |
| Belgium | VRT; RTBF | |
| Belize | Channel 5; Channel 7 | |
| Benin | ORTB | |
| Bermuda | BBC | |
| Bosnia and Herzegovina | BHRT; RTRS; FTV | |
| Botswana | BTV | |
| Brazil | Globo; Record; Bandeirantes; ESPN; Fox Sports; SporTV | |
| Brunei | Kristal-Astro | |
| Bulgaria | BNT; TV+ | |
| Burundi | RTNB | |
| Cambodia | TVK; Hang Meas | |
| Canada | CBC/Radio-Canada; TSN; Sportsnet; RDS | |
| Cape Verde | RTC | |
| Caribbean | CANOC Broadcasting Inc.; CBU; CWC; ESPN | |
| Cayman Islands | Hurley's TV Ltd | |
| Central African Republic | TéléCentrafrique | |
| Central Asia | Dentsu^{2} | |
| Chad | Télé Tchad | |
| Chile | TVN | |
| China | CCTV; Tencent; Ali Sports | |
| Colombia | Caracol Televisión; Canal RCN | |
| Comoros | ORTV | |
| Congo | TELE Congo | |
| Costa Rica | Repretel | |
| Croatia | HRT | |
| Cuba | ICRT | |
| Cyprus | CyBC | |
| Czech Republic | Czech Radio; TV Nova; Czech Radio | |
| Democratic Republic of the Congo | RTNC | |
| Denmark | DR; TV2 | |
| Dominican Republic | CDN | |
| Ecuador | Teleamazonas | |
| El Salvador | TCS | |
| Eritrea | Eri-TV | |
| Estonia | ERR; MTG | |
| Europe | Sportfive^{3} | |
| Fiji | FBC; Fiji Television | |
| Finland | Yle | |
| France | France Télévisions; Canal+ | |
| Gabon | RTG | |
| Gambia | Groupe Excaf Telecom | |
| Georgia | GPB | |
| Germany | ARD; ZDF | |
| Ghana | GBC | |
| Greece | ERT; OTE | |
| Grenada | GBN | |
| Guatemala | Radio y Televisión de Guatemala | |
| Guinea | RTG | |
| Guinea Bissau | Guine Bissau Televisao; RTGB | |
| Guyana | NCN | |
| Haiti | Canal+ | |
| Honduras | VTV | |
| Hong Kong | TVB | |
| Hungary | MTVA | |
| Iceland | RÚV; 365 | |
| India | Doordarshan | |
| Indonesia | Emtek | |
| Iran | IRIB | |
| Ireland | RTÉ | |
| Israel | Sport 5 | |
| Italy | RAI^{4} | |
| Ivory Coast | RTI | |
| Jamaica | Television Jamaica; CVM | |
| Japan | Japan Consortium | |
| Kazakhstan | Khabar TV; KazTRK | |
| Kenya | KBC | |
| Kosovo | RTK; SuperSport | |
| Kuwait | KTV | |
| Kyrgyzstan | KTRK | |
| Laos | LNTV | |
| Latin America^{5} | América Móvil; DirecTV; ESPN; Fox Sports | |
| Latvia | LTV; MTG | |
| Lesotho | Lesotho TV | |
| Liberia | LBS | |
| Liechtenstein | SRG SSR | |
| Lithuania | LNK; Lietuvos rytas TV; MTG | |
| Luxembourg | RTL | |
| Macau | TDM; CCTV | |
| Macedonia | MRT | |
| Madagascar | ORTM | |
| Malawi | MBC | |
| Malaysia | Astro; HyppTV; RTM | |
| Marshall Islands | MBC | |
| Mauritius | MBC | |
| Mexico | Canal 22; Canal Once | |
| MENA | ASBU; beIN Sports; Abu Dhabi Sports | |
| Moldova | TRM | |
| Mongolia | MNB; MNC | |
| Montenegro | RTCG | |
| Morocco | SNRT | |
| Mozambique | TVM | |
| Myanmar | MRTV; Sky Net; Channel 9 | |
| Namibia | NBC | |
| Nauru | Nauru Media Bureau | |
| Netherlands | NOS | |
| New Zealand | Prime; Sky Television | |
| Nigeria | DAAR Communications Plc; Hip TV; NTA; Silverbird Communications | |
| Niue | BCN | |
| North Korea | SBS | |
| Norway | TV 2 | |
| Pacific Islands^{6} | Sky Television | |
| Pakistan | PTV | |
| Palau | PNCC | |
| Papua New Guinea | EM TV | |
| Paraguay | Paraguay TV | |
| Peru | Latina Television | |
| Philippines | TV5 | |
| Poland | TVP | |
| Portugal | RTP; Sport TV | |
| Puerto Rico | NBCUniversal | |
| Qatar | QGBTC | |
| Romania | TVR | |
| Russia | C1R; VGTRK; NTV Plus | |
| Rwanda | RTV | |
| Saint Kitts and Nevis | ZIZ | |
| Saint Lucia | HTS | |
| Samoa | SBC | |
| San Marino | RAI^{4} | |
| Senegal | Groupe Excaf Telecom | |
| Serbia | RTS | |
| Seychelles | SBC | |
| Sierra Leone | SLBC | |
| Singapore | Mediacorp | |
| Slovakia | RTVS; TV Nova | |
| Slovenia | RTV Slovenija | |
| Solomon Islands | Solomon Telekom | |
| South Africa | SABC; SuperSport | |
| South Asia | Star India | |
| South Korea | SBS; MBC; KBS | |
| Spain | RTVE | |
| Sri Lanka | Sri Lanka Rupavahini Corporation | |
| Sub-Saharan Africa | SuperSport; Infront Sports & Media; TV5Monde; Canal+ | |
| Suriname | STVS; ABC | |
| Swaziland | Swazi TV | |
| Sweden | MTG | |
| Switzerland | SRG SSR | |
| Taiwan | ELTA TV; Chunghwa Telecom; Formosa Television; PTS | |
| Tajikistan | Television Varzish | |
| Tanzania | Azam Media | |
| Thailand | TPT | |
| Tonga | TBC | |
| Trinidad and Tobago | CNMG; CCN TV6 | |
| Tunisia | ERTT | |
| Turkey | TRT | |
| Uganda | UBC | |
| Ukraine | NTKU | |
| United Arab Emirates | Abu Dhabi Media | |
| United Kingdom | BBC | |
| United States | NBCUniversal | |
| Uruguay | TNU | |
| Uzbekistan | MTRK | |
| Vanuatu | VBTC | |
| Venezuela | TVes | |
| Vietnam | VTV; Yan TV | |
| Zimbabwe | ZBC | |

Notes
^1 – Rights in 16 Asian countries were resold to local broadcasters.
^2 – Rights were resold to local broadcasters.
^3 – Rights in each country to be resold to local broadcasters, except France, Germany, Italy, Spain, Ireland and the United Kingdom.
^4 – Rights were originally acquired by Sky Italia, but the broadcaster sold them in 2013 to Rai.
^5 – Rights in all Latin America countries except Brazil.
^6 – Rights in Cook Islands, Fiji, Kiribati, Marshall Islands, Federated States of Micronesia, Nauru, Niue, Palau, Samoa, Solomon Islands, Tonga, Tuvalu, and Vanuatu.
