= Wishline =

French luxury television channel

Wishline was a Luxembourg-based French luxury television channel owned by Vivendi subsidiary MultiThématiques. The channel was distributed to several European countries where Canal+ had a television platform. It was a luxury shopping channel, offering commercial airtime to sectors such as cars, realty, airplanes and travel. The channel's name was also interpreted as "Wish Online", as the channel also had a dedicated website.

== History ==
The channel started broadcasting on 4 December 1999. Instead of broadcasting from France, MultiThématiques decided to base the channel from Luxembourg as the luxury "classifieds" channel did not cater to French content quotas imposed by regulator CSA. Programming was available in the clear on Astra and encrypted on Hotbird; its launch budget was of 45 million francs and employed 30 staff, with hopes to reach break even by June 2001. The TV channel delivered a one-hour daily block which was repeated throughout the day, consisting of reports on sold or borrowed items, while the website had access to the day's classified listings. Moreover, by broadcasting from Luxembourg, the channel would easily cater to a pan-European market, by broadcasting in five languages (French, Italian, English, Spanish and German). Negotiations with other pay-TV companies in Europe were already underway.

In January 2000, the channel launched on Canal Satélite Digital in Spain. Some noteworthy items sold up until March 2000 included a 1961 Ferrari 250 sold to a British buyer, as well as a 17th century French mansion and two mansions in Florida to unknown buyers. On 2 and 3 December 2000, it simulcast the auctioning of 145 items that belonged to Maria Callas, on the eve of her 73rd anniversary, produced by The Auction Channel.

On 14 January 2001, the channel launched in Latin America. In September 2001, Wishline shut down as a linear channel by revoking its Luxembourgish license, and its website (based in nearby Longwy on the French side of the border) was struggling. Bruno Thibaudeau, the group's director-general, said that all versions of the channel "did not correspond to the needs of the market", like the German version of their fishing and hunting channel Seasons.
