= OCS (TV network) =

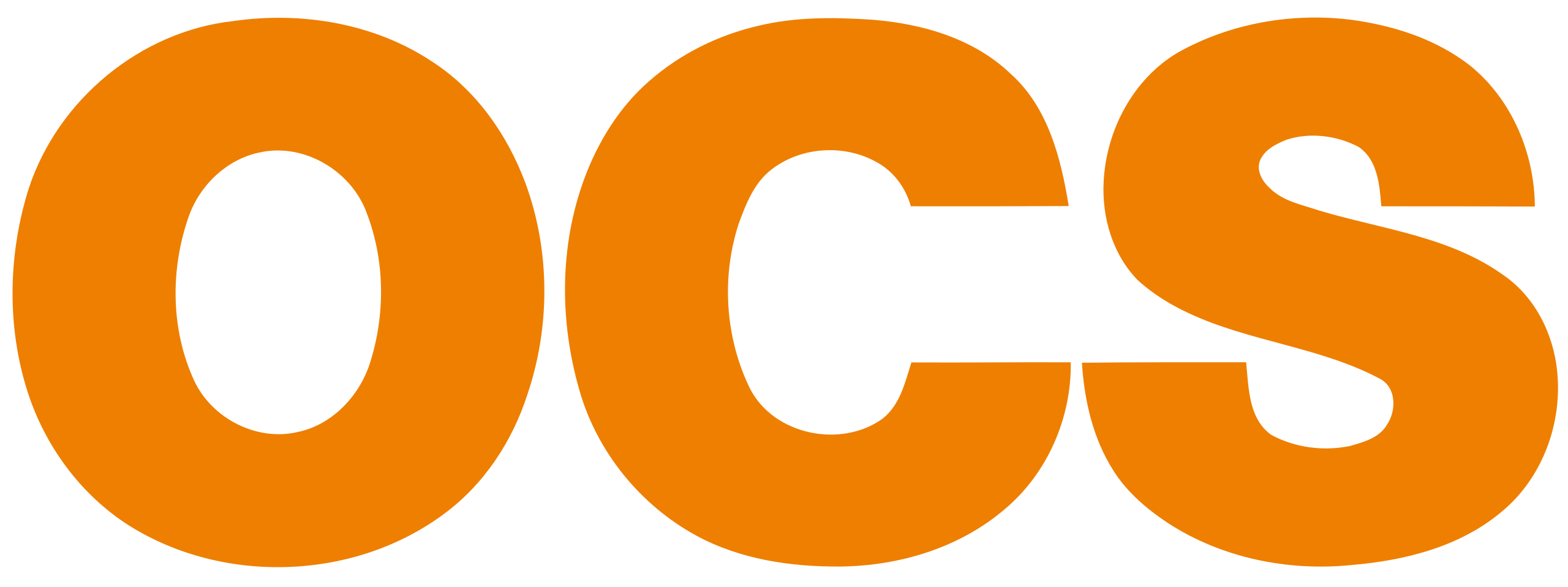
- Country: France
- Broadcast area: France, Switzerland, Mauritius
- Headquarters: Paris, France

Programming
- Languages: French; Original audio track
- Picture format: 576i (SDTV); 1080i (HDTV)

Ownership
- Owner: Groupe Canal+

History
- Launched: 13 November 2008; 17 years ago
- Closed: 3 July 2024; 2 years ago
- Replaced by: Ciné+ OCS
- Former names: Orange Cinéma Séries (2008–2012)

OCS, or previously known as Orange Cinéma Séries, was a group of French pay television networks that is dedicated to films and series. It was launched in November 2008 by Orange S.A. and was later sold to Groupe Canal+

The channels launched on November 13, 2008, as part of the company's new direct-to-home satellite service and was exclusive to Orange TV.

OCS is composed of three channels and a streaming service. OCS broadcast almost all their series in English with French subtitles in simulcast with the American broadcasting, but they also broadcast series dubbed in French or French series. From November 2008 to December 2022, OCS was holding the French rights to HBO production.

From 2012, OCS TV package was available from Bouygues Telecom, CanalSat, Numericable, Orange TV, SFR and Tahiti Nui Satellite. All subscribers have the option to subscribe to OCS with their TV distributor. OCS is also available through multi devices. In 2024, following its acquisition by the Groupe Canal+, the channels were closed and replaced by Ciné+ OCS.

== History ==
In April 2008, France Telecom (who would rebranded as Orange in 2013) announced that they're creating a new movie direct-to-home satellite service by launching Orange Cinema Series, a package of six pay-TV channels exclusive to Orange's customers and had signed exclusive content deals with Warner Bros. (including HBO), Gaumont, Metro-Goldwyn-Mayer to show their movies and TV series to the service.

In October 2008, it was announced that Orange had set the launch date of their subscription-based multiplatform Orange Cinema Series along with their announced five new pay-TV premium movie channels which were called Orange Cinemax (for major blockbusters in HD), Orange Cinéhappy (for family films), Orange Cinéchoc (for action movies), Orange Cinénovo (for independent and art house films) and Orange Cinegeants (for timeless classic movies) as part of the company's then-new television service named Orange TV to November 13, 2008 with HBO's programming being available in that same day on the Orange Cinema Series service.

A month later on November of that same year, Orange Cinema Series was officially launched along with their five channels.

=== Attempted merger with Canal+ ===
In September 2010, France Telecom had announced that there in talks with Groupe Canal+ the owner of CinéCinema and TPS Star channels to merge Orange's Orange Cinema Series with Canal+'s general entertainment channel TPS Star to create a premium

On January 20, 2011, France Telecom and Canal+ had announced that they're creating a new enterprise partnership that could merge the blockbuster film channel Orange Cinema Series with TPS Star to create a proposed premium pay TV channel which was planned to be called Orange Cine Star. It was going to be distributed by the Orange services and CanalSat was about to be available to other French telco operators.

On 25 November 2011, Canal+ took a 33% share in Orange Cinéma Séries. Originally exclusive to La TV d'Orange, Orange Cinéma Séries joined CanalSat on 5 April 2012. On 22 September 2012, Orange Cinéma Séries became OCS to show its expansion bouquets other than Orange TV.

On 10 October 2013, OCS Happy was merged with OCS Max; OCS à la demande became the multiplatform service OCS Go; and OCS Novo was replaced by OCS City, specialised in TV series and HBO productions.

Since 2008, OCS have an exclusive contract with HBO, but other channels like Canal+ Séries can broadcasts reruns of HBO series. In 2017, OCS's contract with HBO became stricter, giving complete exclusivity to OCS.

The suite also includes a streaming service, OCS Go, who simply became OCS in 2019. Content is provided by exclusive contracts with Warner Bros., HBO, MGM and Fidelity as well as non-exclusive contracts with Gaumont, SND, BAC and Wild Side.

On 2 August 2017, OCS was launched in Switzerland on Teleclub Premium. It is also available on the Ciné-Séries bouquet of Canal+ since March 2019.

=== Acquisition by Canal+ ===
When Warner Bros. Discovery announced that their removing of HBO shows on OCS in return for the former launching their own streaming service in France, it was announced that Orange was considering selling their movie bouquet OCS along with their channels including their production arm Orange Studio to other French companies

In December 2022, OCS deal with HBO ended with most HBO productions leaving OCS from January 2023 onwards. Following that, OCS closed OCS City, the channel that was in charge of HBO programs, and merged it with OCS Choc to create OCS Pulp.

On January 8, 2023, Canal+ Group along with Orange had announced that Groupe Canal+ had secured a deal with Orange and the latter announced that they were acquiring both Orange's rival premium pay-TV movie services OCS along with their three channels and its film production and television co-production house Orange Studio, which Canal+ previously owned the minority stake on Orange's pay-TV arm and film division. The planned acquisition would give Canal+

In January 2024, Groupe Canal+ announced that they had finalised their acquisition of Orange's pay-TV premium movie service OCS along with their three premium television channels and the film production and television series co-production company Orange Studios from long-time partner Orange after the acquisition was conditionally approved by the French Competition Authority

== TV channels ==
Channel	Type	Notes	Launched	Closed
	Blockbusters, comedies, family and teen films	Programs have been moved to Ciné+ Premier (Now OCS), Ciné+ Frisson and Ciné+ Family	2008	2024
	Classic films	Programs have been moved to Ciné+ Classic	2008	2024
(previously OCS Go)	Merged to Ciné+ then Ciné+ OCS launched	Streaming service	2013	2024
	Merged to Ciné+ then Ciné+ OCS launched	Independent, arthouse, action, thriller and horror films	2023 Programs have been moved to Ciné+ Frisson and Ciné+ Festival	2024
	Family and teen channel	Programs have been moved to OCS Max	2008	2013
	Independent and art house films	Became OCS City	2008	2013
	Action, thriller and horror films	Merged and became OCS Pulp	2008	2023
	Independent, art house films and programs from HBO	Merged and became OCS Pulp	2013	2023

== Logo ==
=== 2008-2012 ===
Orange Ciné Max logo from November 13, 2008 to September 22, 2012.

Orange Ciné Happy logo from November 13, 2008 to September 22, 2012.

Orange Ciné Choc logo from November 13, 2008 to September 22, 2012.

Orange Ciné Novo logo from November 13, 2008 to September 22, 2012.

Orange Ciné Geants logo from November 13, 2008 to September 22, 2012.

=== 2012-2022 ===
OCS Max logo from September 22, 2012 to February 1, 2022.

OCS Happy logo from September 22, 2012 to October 10, 2013.

OCS Choc logo from September 22, 2012 to February 1, 2022.

OCS Novo logo from September 22, 2012 to October 10, 2013.

OCS Geants logo from September 22, 2012 to February 1, 2022.

OCS City logo from October 10, 2013 to February 1, 2022.

=== 2022-2024 ===
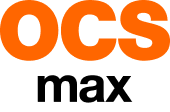
OCS Max logo from February 1, 2022 to July 3, 2024.

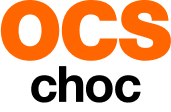
OCS Choc logo from February 1, 2022 to January 12, 2023.

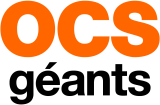
OCS Géants logo from February 1, 2022 to July 3, 2024.

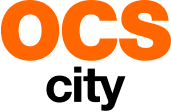
OCS City logo from February 1, 2022 to January 12, 2023.

OCS Pulp logo from January 12, 2023 to July 3, 2024.

== Series ==
=== OCS Max (2008-2024) ===
This list includes programs from OCS Happy who have been moved to OCS Max.

- 2 Broke Girls
- 3615 Monique
- Aïcha
- Alphonse Président
- Angry Birds Toons
- Band of Brothers
- Being Erica
- Better with You
- Black Sails
- Boardwalk Empire (season 1-4, other seasons on OCS City)
- La Bouse
- Breaking Bad (season 1-4, other seasons on OCS City)
- Bunheads
- Cougar Town
- Crash
- Éternelle
- Entourage
- Falling Skies
- France Kbek
- Fantômette (2000)
- The Garfield Show
- Gary Unmarried
- The Girlfriend Experience
- Glee
- Good Behavior
- The Handmaid's Tale
- Hell on Wheels (season 1-2, other seasons on OCS Choc)
- Holly Weed
- Houdini
- The Hour
- How to Make It in America
- Hung
- In Treatment
- John Adams
- Kinky et Cosy
- Lazy Company
- Legion
- Luck
- Magic City
- Make It or Break It
- Merci Julie !
- Mildred Pierce
- Mr Selfridge
- Mr. Sunshine
- The No. 1 Ladies' Detective Agency
- Pretty Little Liars
- Quarry
- Q.I. (season 1-2)
- Rubicon
- Seinfeld
- Sex and the City
- Six Feet Under
- True Blood (season 1-6, other seasons on OCS City)
- Turn: Washington's Spies
- Veep (season 1-2, other seasons on OCS City)
- War and Peace
- The White Princess
- The White Queen
- Winx Club
- Zak

=== OCS Choc (2008-2023) ===
- Ash vs Evil Dead
- Band of Brothers
- The Fear (2012)
- Game of Thrones (season 1-3, other seasons on OCS City)
- Generation Kill
- Hell on Wheels
- House of Saddam
- Justified
- Kingdom
- Kinky et Cosy
- The Knick
- Misfits
- Outcast
- Plaisir de Nuire, Joie de Décevoir
- Power
- Powers
- Preacher
- Revivre
- The Sopranos
- Spartacus: Blood and Sand
- Spartacus: Gods of the Arena
- Spartacus: Vengeance
- Trafics
- The Walking Dead

=== OCS City (2013-2023) ===
- 1992
- The Art Of Television : Les réalisateurs de séries
- Atlanta
- Ballers
- Band of Brothers
- Being Human
- Big Little Lies
- Blunt Talk
- Breaking Bad
- The Brink
- Boardwalk Empire
- Bored to Death
- Boss
- The Casual Vacancy
- Crashing
- Curb Your Enthusiasm
- Divorce
- Eastbound & Down
- Episodes
- Entourage
- Extra Life
- Flesh and Bone
- The Game
- Game of Thrones
- Girls
- Hello Ladies
- High Maintenance
- Irma Vep
- Irresponsable
- In America
- Insecure
- John Adams
- The Knick
- The Leftovers
- Looking
- Louie
- Low Winter Sun
- Manhattan
- Masters of Sex
- Missions
- Mozart in the Jungle
- Mr Selfridge
- The Newsroom
- The Night Of
- The Office
- Q.I.
- Room 104
- Rome
- Search Party
- Sex and the City
- Sex and the Series
- Show Me a Hero
- Silicon Valley
- Six Feet Under
- The Sopranos
- Templeton
- Togetherness
- Transparent
- Treme
- True Blood
- True Detective
- Veep
- Vice Principals
- Vinyl
- Xanadu
- Westworld
- The White Lotus

=== OCS Pulp (2023-2024) ===
- 3615 Monique
- Tales of the Walking Dead
