= DStv =

Satellite television service in Africa

- Logo used since 2023
- Type: Subsidiary
- Industry: Pay television Telecoms
- Founded: 6 October 1995; 31 years ago
- Headquarters: Randburg, Gauteng, South Africa
- Area served: Africa
- Products: Direct Broadcast Satellite; IPTV
- Services: Cable television; Streaming television
- Owner: Canal+ S.A.
- Website: dstv.com

Digital Satellite Television, abbreviated DStv, is a South African direct broadcast satellite company owned by MultiChoice. The company provides audio, radio, and television channels and related services to subscribers across Africa. Most subscribers reside in South Africa, Nigeria, and Zimbabwe.

== History ==
In 1986, pay-television came to South Africa when a single-channel analogue service, M-Net, was launched by Naspers and local businesses/companies. For almost seven years, all of M-Net's operations were handled by a single dedicated company until 1995 when a second subsidiary company, MultiChoice, was launched.

MultiChoice would take over the operations of M-Net including decoder sales, subscriber services, which were also available in local stores, and account management. MultiChoice would also embark on establishing presence in multiple countries outside South Africa.

Not long after, a digital satellite service in South Africa was announced by MultiChoice and was launched that same year on 6 October 1995 as DStv, an abbreviation for Digital Satellite Television. On its launch, DStv offered a package of 16 channels: Cartoon Network, CNN, a 40-channel DMX audio service, ESPN, Hallmark, K-T.V., M-Net, Movie Magic, SelecTV, Sky News, SuperSport, TNT, Travel Channel, the Trinity Broadcasting Network, TV5 Afrique, MTV and VH1. The launch of DStv was deemed "satisfactory", with decoder sales having surpassed 10,000 units by November 1995.

This prompted changes to the main M-Net channel, which, while having its formula unchanged, started concentrating more on African productions, while K-T.V., Movie Magic and SuperSport gained their own separate channels. Aside from the DMX service, subscribers also had access to Radio 702 and Voice of America. Multichoice expected the number of channels to be increased to 24 by early 1996.

Within weeks of its launch, DStv added its first new channels, Discovery Channel and BBC World. The latter was available over the terrestrial frequencies of M-Net eleven hours a day; this enabled subscribers to watch the channel 24/7. By September 1996, DStv had 55,000 subscribers.

In February 1998, DStv had 70,000 subscribers across the continent. By June that year, the number skyrocketed to 215,000 in Sub-Saharan Africa and 31,000 in Egypt and the Middle East. With the launch of BBC Prime in March 1999, it had risen to nearly 350,000, an increase of 30% within the past ten months. This also coincided with the arrival of National Geographic Channel and the South African business network Summit.

Interactive services started in 2000 with six datacasting channels aimed primarily at the South African market. These channels featured games, news, weather, and soon, the possibility of accessing internet services, banking, video-on-demand and camera angles during key sporting events.

Over the 2 decades since then till today, television channels launch on the platform when channel carriage contracts are signed and/or renewed between MultiChoice and another media conglomerate/broadcaster and ceases transmission when channel carriage contracts are not renewed or by decisions made by the latter.

In July 2003, DSTV launched Africa Magic as a movie and general entertainment channel geared at showcasing Nollywood talent and African culture. At the time of its launch it received high popularity amongst DStv subscribers, especially in South Africa and Nigeria.

This was followed by the launch of new services including: W4 Eutelsat satellite with Ku-band services to Sub-Saharan Africa and the Indian Ocean Islands in 2000 (which Multichoice bought five transponders), Interactive Television in 2002, the Dual-view decoder in 2003, and the DStv PVR decoder and the DStv Compact subscription package bundle in 2005.

Thanks to the new contract with Eutelsat, DStv vastly improved its channel offer by starting Ku-band signals in West Africa, as well as the inclusion of new Lusophone channels in Angola and Mozambique (RTP Internacional – already in South Africa up until then, SIC Internacional and TV Globo Internacional), three channels from India (Sony Entertainment Television India, B4U and Zee TV) and the possibility of adding Arab and Lebanese channels in West Africa.

The interactive services were provided by American company OpenTV and launched in the first half of 2002. SuperSport had already started an interactive service, SuperSport Zone, in May 2001. By March 2002, the roll-out was completed, by means of a new decoder, 720i.

In November 2006, DSTV added KBC and KTN to its Kenyan subscribers' package.

The year 2008 saw the introduction of the HD PVR decoder, the XtraView decoder and the high definition feed of the M-Net channel. On 1 September of that year, it launched BBC Entertainment (replacing BBC Prime), BBC Lifestyle, BBC Knowledge, CBeebies and, in a separate agreement, ESPN Classic.

In 2010, DVB over IP (Digital Video Broadcast over Internet Protocol) and DStv Catchup services were launched, as well as the HD PVR 2P decoder same year and M-Net Movies 1 got simulcast in high definition for the first time. DStv BoxOffice (a film/movie rental/on-demand service) and DStv Mobile were launched in 2011. Since 2012, DStv has also been re-broadcast on Saint Helena, but with only 30 selected channels.

Multichoice Nigeria has faced significant challenges. The company lost 243,000 subscribers across its DStv and GOtv platforms between April and September 2024, primarily due to Nigeria's severe economic conditions, including inflation exceeding 30%. This decline is part of a larger trend, with an 18% drop in subscribers in Nigeria reported earlier in March 2024.

The economic pressures have forced many Nigerian households to disconnect from the pay-TV service. Additionally, the company faces growing competition from streaming services and changing consumer viewing habits, which continue to pressure its traditional pay-TV model. However, MultiChoice is taking steps to address these challenges. The company has invested ZAR1.6 billion in its streaming service, Showmax, which has shown impressive growth of 50% year-over-year.

=== Acquisition by Canal+ S.A. ===
Nearly a year later, on February 1, 2024, Canal+ made an offer to MultiChoice's investors to acquire remaining shares, subject to regulatory approval, offering a price of R105 per share, 40% higher than the price of R75 offered the previous day. MultiChoice rejected the offer believing it undervalued the company and following a reprimand by the Takeover Regulation Panel, Canal+ revised its offer and upped its bid to R125 per share, the share price was 67% higher than the MultiChoice share price.

In June 2024, Canal+ Group and MultiChoice released a joint circular with the French broadcaster that has obtained 45,2% of company shares with an interim board approving on the revised offer. Both companies made a filing to local regulators in September 2024 with the terms of the agreement remaining unchanged.

Under the deal, Canal+ will spin out MultiChoice SA's broadcasting licence which includes DStv as an independent entity to comply with the Electronic Communications Act, which prohibits foreign entities from owning more than 20%. New shareholders set to enter the transaction include Former Telkom's CEO Sipho Maseko's Afrifund Investment and businesswoman Sonja De Bruyn's Identity Partners that will form the entity known as LicenceCo to handle the operations in South Africa and give it 51% economic interest with the remaining 49% for Canal+.

== Subscription services ==
=== DStv ===
DStv airs more than 200 television channels and radio stations. The list of channels differ across the regions of Sub-Saharan Africa.

DStv offers five packages in South Africa: Premium, Movies & Series, Sports, Select and Starter. The package offering was relaunched in South Africa in September 2026. It also offers add-on packages for premium film and series channels, and language-specific channels in Indian, Portuguese, and French.

Packages differ across countries in Africa.

=== DStv Angola & Mozambique ===
DStv offers nine Portuguese-dedicated packages (Mega & Premium, Bué, Grande+, Grande, Família+, Família, Fácil, Básico), which are available in Angola and Mozambique.

=== CANAL+ ===
DStv offers two French-dedicated packages (French Touch & French Plus) courtesy of CANAL+ from CANAL+ S.A. providing a selection of over 15 channels across specific genres (excluding South Africa). These include:

- CANAL+ Sport 1
- CANAL+ Sport 2
- CANAL+ Sport 3
- CANAL+ Première
- CANAL+ Cinéma
- CANAL+ Action
- CANAL+ Magic
- Infosport+
- A+
- Piwi+
- NOVELAS+
- Nollywood TV
- Planète+
- France 2
- France 24
- Passion Bollywood

== Reception equipment ==
DStv has their set-top boxes manufactured by domestic company, Altech UEC, along with Arris International (for South Africa only) and Chinese electronics company, Skyworth, for the rest of the continent. The choice of boxes include a standard box with "XtraView" capabilities, an older personal video recorder, and the then-newest PVR box known as the Explora. An additional decoder known as the currently-discontinued Drifta allows the conversion of a DStv DVB-H signal to another digital device such as a laptop, tablet or smartphone for portable in-home viewing.

=== DStv Stream ===
In South Africa, DStv also offers five packages (Premium, Movies & Series, Sports, Select and Starter), on mobile app for mobile phone and tablet devices, along with PC to control DVRs and parental controls and allow access to recorded content and video on demand services. The app was previously known as DStv Mobile until 2016 and DStv Now until 2020, with the app called DStv Stream as of 2023.

== Controversies ==
=== Price fixing ===
In May 2017, DStv admitted to price fixing and contravening the Competition Act and agreed to pay R22 million in penalties as well as R8 million to the Economic Development Fund of South Africa.
