= Kirch Group =

German media group

KirchGroup
- Native name: KirchGruppe
- Industry: Media
- Founded: 1955; 71 years ago in Bavaria, Germany
- Founder: Leo Kirch
- Defunct: 2002
- Fate: Bankruptcy, assets sold
- Successor: EM.TV & Merchandising (Junior library)
- Headquarters: Bavaria, Germany

KirchGruppe (KirchGroup) was a German media group founded by Leo Kirch in the 1950s. It was the dominant buyer and seller of TV programming rights in Germany. By 2000, it controlled a 52.5 percent stake in what became the country's biggest broadcaster, ProSiebenSat.1 Media.

The group collapsed in 2002 largely due to the debts associated with the purchase of sports rights for its television channels and the launch of pay-TV services. It was Germany's biggest corporate collapse since World War II.

KirchMedia declared bankruptcy on 8 April 2002, followed by KirchPayTV on 8 May and finally KirchBeteiligung on 12 June of the same year, along with the holding company for the group, Taurus Holding.

== History ==
In 1955, Kirch, an assistant professor at LMU Munich, founded Sirius Films and in 1956, he borrowed $54,000 to acquire the German rights to Federico Fellini's La Strada, which was successful in Germany. He also bought the rights to other Italian films, including Franco Rossi's Amici per la pelle, which became the first feature film to be broadcast on German TV without a prior theatrical release in 1958 after failing to find a distributor. In 1958, he acquired seven Luchino Visconti films.

In 1959, he formed Beta Film and in 1961 Reiner E. Moritz joined and became chief executive of BetaFilm. The Kirch Group moved into the American market in 1959, acquiring the television rights to 100 films from United Artists and Warner Bros.

In 1960, Kirch made its first package sale, selling 700 films to German public broadcaster ARD. In 1963, it sold 300 films to Germany's second public broadcaster ZDF. Also in 1963, Kirch founded TaurusFilm as a rights acquisition company. TaurusFilm Video was founded in 1983 as a pioneering company for sell-through home video.

With conductor Herbert von Karajan, Kirch founded the classical music production company Cosmotel in 1964. Cosmotel broke up and in 1966 Unitel was established to replace it. Unitel produced Great Performances for PBS in 1974, the first weekly classical music program in the United States and became the world's leading producer of classical music film, TV and video.

Kirch co-founded Teleclub in Switzerland, the first pay TV channel in Europe. Following the launch of Germany's first commercial broadcaster Sat.1 in 1984, Kirch subsidized their entertainment programming for two years. In 1988, Kirch took over PKS (Programmgesellschaft für Kabel- und Satellitenrundfunk) which gave the group a 43% stake on Sat.1. In 1997, the stake was increased to 59%.

In 1985, Kirch acquired 10% of Germany's largest newspaper publisher Axel Springer following the death of the founder. The investment in Axel Springer eventually increased to over 40%.

In 1989, Kirch acquired Germany's second largest book club, Deutschen Büecherbund, from Holtzbrinck Publishing Group.

In 1991, Germany's first pay-TV channel, Premiere, was launched by Kirch, Bertelsmann and Canal+ and took over Teleclub's 100,000 subscribers. In 1993, Kirch launched Deutsches Sportfernsehen (DSF), Germany's first commercial sports channel. The same year, they also invested in Spanish broadcaster Telecinco and in 1995 acquired shares in Italian media company Mediaset. Kirch became a key player in sports broadcasting rights, paying large amounts for the rights to the German Bundesliga.

In 1992, Kirch acquired DEFA Studio and film dubbing company DEFA Synchron, which it renamed JohannisthalSynchron.

In 1996, Kirch launched Germanys first digital broadcaster DF1 with British Sky Broadcasting (BSkyB). In addition, it purchased the non-US television rights to the 2002 and 2006 FIFA World Cups for €1.9 billion.

Kirch also held (at one time) a 49% interest in distributor Constantin Film and a 40% share in Swiss exhibitor Cinetrade.

After many rumors about outside investors including Silvio Berlusconi and Al Waleed bin Talal Al Saud being considered, the Kirch Group was restructured into three umbrella companies from 1999 onwards, which were linked to each other via KirchHolding GmbH & Co. KG (later TaurusHolding GmbH & Co. KG). Al Waleed bought 3.19 percent of KirchMedia in 1999, and 3.3 percent of KirchPayTV for $150 million. Berlusconi agreed to a joint venture with Kirch, a European television production and distribution network called Eureka.

In 2000, ProSieben Media AG, in which Kirch had a 58.6% ownership, merged with Sat.1 to become Germany's biggest broadcaster ProSiebenSat.1 Media, with Kirch owning a controlling 52.5% stake in the new company.

In February 2001, Kirch Beteiligung agreed to rescue German based EM.TV which had purchased Speed Investments for £1.1 billion and held a majority share of Formula One's commercial rights. In return, Kirch received a 49% stake in the company and control of Speed Investments. Alan Henry of The Guardian reported that the two companies also agreed to exercise EM.TV's option to purchase another 25% of SLEC Holdings, the holding company of the Formula One companies, for approximately £600 million in late-March 2001. To raise Speed Investments' share of SLEC to 75%, Kirch borrowed €1.6 billion, €1 billion from Bayerische Landesbank (BayernLB) and the rest from Lehman Brothers and JPMorgan Chase. Kirch's involvement raised concerns among the major automobile manufacturers who participate in Formula One.

Due to the agreement associated with their shareholding, SLEC was controlled by Kirch, who controlled the board of Formula One Holdings (FOH). Due to huge losses and massive expenditures, Kirch's creditors put the company into receivership in 2002. These banks dismantled the group. Kirch's share of SLEC was retained by BayernLB, JPMorgan Chase and Lehman Brothers (through Speed Investments).

=== KirchMedia ===
KirchMedia declared bankruptcy on 8 April 2002. A month prior to the bankruptcy, FIFA had stripped the company of rights to the World Cup.

KirchMedia's main assets were:

==== Television ====
- ProSiebenSat.1 Media (52.5%)
- DSF (100%)
- Junior TV (50%)
- Telecinco (25%)

==== Production ====
- ndF (90%)
- Roxy Film (100%)
- Filmproduktion Janus (100%)
- TaurusMediaTechnik (100%)
- JohannisthalSynchron (100%)

==== Rights trading ====
- Beta Film (100%)
- TaurusLizenz (100%), owner of fiction and media medium rights.
- KirchSport (100%), which held the TV rights to the FIFA World Cup and other sports
- ISPR (51%)
- TaurusProduktion (100%), a film and TV production group

=== KirchPayTV ===
KirchPayTV was majority owned by Taurus Holding, but BSkyB held 22% along with Lehman Brothers (2.4%) and Saudi Prince Al-Waleed (3.12%). The company's main assets were:

- Premiere (100%)
- BetaDigital (100%)
- Teleclub (40%)

KirchPayTV filed for bankruptcy on 8 May 2002.

=== KirchBeteiligung ===
KirchBeteiligung's main assets were:

- Speed Investments (78%)
- Unitel (100%)
- PrintBeteiligungs GmbH (100 %)
- Axel Springer (40%)
- Constantin Film (21%)
- Cinetrade (40%)

KirchBeteiligung filed for bankruptcy on 12 June 2002, along with the Taurus Holding parent company of the Kirch Group.

== Kirch archives ==
Kirch's archives were one of the largest film libraries in the world with over 15,000 films and 50,000 hours of television programmes and the biggest supplier of German language films. It included 1,000 films from Howard Hughes' RKO Pictures library and 1,200 titles from the Hal Roach library.
