= Polynésie la 1ère =

Polynésie La Première
- Country: French Polynesia, France
- Network: La Première
- Headquarters: Pāmata'i, Faʻaʻā, French Polynesia

Programming
- Languages: French; Tahitian
- Picture format: 1080i HDTV (downscaled to 576i for the SDTV feed)

Ownership
- Owner: France Télévisions

History
- Launched: 3 October 1965; 60 years ago
- Former names: ORTF Télé Tahiti (1965–1975); FR3-Tahiti (1975–1982); RFO Tahiti (1983–1988); RFO 1 Polynésie (1988–1999); Télé Polynesia (1999–2010); Polynésie 1^{re} (2010–2018)

Links
- Website: m.la1ere.francetvinfo.fr/polynesie/

Availability

Terrestrial
- DVB-T: Channel 1

Polynésie La Première (French pronunciation: [pɔlinezi la pʁəmjɛʁ], lit. 'Polynesia the First'), also known as Polynésie la 1ère, is a French public television channel based in Faʻaʻā which broadcasts in French Polynesia. It is owned by the French Government via France Télévisions

== History ==
In return for the installation of nuclear testing center in Mururoa in French Polynesia, the General de Gaulle promised to provide free Polynesian television. In 1963, the implementation of television transmitters was launched and RTF headquarters on Dumont D'Urville Street in Papeete was enlarged in 1964 to accommodate the new ORTF television studios. Since October 3, 1965, the first ORTF Télé Tahiti images on channel 6 have been broadcast from the small studio of 45 m2 of the station and can be received from around Papeete to the part of Moorea in front of Tahiti. The channel then broadcasts three hours a day programs from metropolitan France six months late and national newsletters from the previous week. A few years later, with the introduction of new relay transmitters, a local newscast is broadcast every day of the week.

By 1970, Télé Tahiti was already broadcasting on two transmitters, one of which relaying the Papeete signal. Daily programming ran from 6pm to 9:30pm; French Polynesia had over 8,000 sets in use at the time.

Following the break-up of the ORTF in 1974, the French overseas television stations were integrated into the new French national program company France Regions 3 (FR3), the new French channel of the regions, within France of the FR3 DOM-TOM delegation. The channel became FR3-Tahiti on January 6, 1975 and, like each regional metropolitan station, produced and broadcast a regional newscast, but was also responsible for ensuring territorial continuity in the audiovisual field by broadcasting programs from metropolitan television channels. It was finally able to be received by microwave in the Leeward Islands.

The transition to color took place in the course of the year 1977, at the same time as the first satellite link with Paris.

The December 31, 1982, the channel took the name of RFO Tahiti following the creation of the national company of programs RFO (French Overseas Radio-Television) by transfer of the activities of FR3 for Overseas. Its missions remain unchanged, but the new structure has its own budget that should allow it to move from the role of broadcaster to that of program producer. During the following sixteen years, RFO Tahiti gradually acquired quality technical equipment to produce and broadcast more and more regional programs. Advertising on the television channel was permitted on February 1, 1984.

In March 1988, the channel was broadcast by satellite to reach all French Polynesia, and in May, a second radio channel called RFO 2, was launched while the first television channel was renamed RFO 1.

On December 26, 1994, RFO 1 saw its monopoly crumble and faced competition from Canal+ Polynesia, which was setting up in French Polynesia, followed on February 14, 1995 by the bouquet of private and pay programs Téléfenua, and then by the French Polynesia government chain Tahiti Nui TV on June 29, 2000.

RFO changed premises and moved to its new headquarters to Pāmata'i, Faʻaʻā in June 1997.

On February 1, 1999, RFO 1 became Télé Polynesie, following the transformation of RFO into France Overseas Network.

At the end of 2000, by decision of the trusteeship, RFO lost the broadcasting rights of TF1 sports broadcasters, in favor of Tahiti Nui TV.

While it was possible for all Polynesians to receive TV channels New Caledonia, TV Wallis and Futuna, Tempo Caledonia and France O thanks to the satellite Intelsat 701 and RFO since 2003, Télé Polynesia and France Télévisions decided to encrypt Télé Nouvelle Caledonia and Wallis and Futuna TV on the territory of French Polynesia from June 1, 2010.

The Audiovisual Reform Law No. 2004-669 of July 9, 2004 integrated the program company Réseau France Outre-mer into the public broadcaster France Télévisions, which depends on Télé Polynesia. Its president, Rémy Pflimlin, announced on October 12, 2010 the change of name of the Network France Overseas in Network Overseas 1 rd to adapt to the launch of DTT in Overseas. All television channels on the network changed their name on November 30, 2010 at the start of TNT and Tele Polynesia became Polynésie Première. The name change refers to the leading position of this channel on its broadcasting territory and its first place on the remote control and its numbering in coherence with the other antennas of the group France Televisions. In 2018, the definite article "la" was added to the Overseas 1ère channel names, so Polynésie 1ère became Polynésie la 1ère.

La 1ère switched to HD on 15 January 2020 on satellite, and in September on terrestrial when France Ô was closed.

Since 31 August 2020, its children programming block is branded as Okoo.

In 2021 the channel appointed its first Polynesian editor-in-chief, Stella Taaroamea.

== Programming ==
Until the start of TNT overseas, the metropolitan television channels were not broadcast in French Polynesia. Télé Polynesia thus broadcast a program consisting of three hours per day of own productions in French and Tahitian giving priority to proximity, programs from other RFO stations (information, magazines RFO Paris), but reruns or recovery live from the programs of the France Télévisions group (news, magazines, sports, fiction, games, movies, entertainment and youth programs), Arte and independent producers.

Since 30 November 2010 and the arrival of metropolitan public channels, Polynésie 1ère had to increase its own productions, with 25% of local programs and more, giving priority to proximity and addressing economic and social problems of the territory (emissions special events, political debates, recording of shows, football matches, midnight mass, Telethon). The channel is now free to choose its own programs and, thanks to the increased budget it enjoys, it has the necessary means to produce, co-produce and buy. The possibility of taking back certain programs from France Télévisions channels is still possible and the major sports events, in particular football, rugby, tennis, cycling are now all broadcast live from Paris.
