= Joyeux Bin Kabodjo =

Congolese comedian (born 1995)

- Born: Juwe Kazimbe Joyeux; November 26, 1995 (age 30); Bukavu, South Kivu, Zaire
- Occupations: Humorist⁣⁣ comedian storyteller poet jurist
- Years active: 2013–present
- Notable work: Les enfants sucrés (2018); CoVigilance-19 (2020)

Juwe Kazimbe Joyeux (born November 26, 1995), better known as Joyeux Bin Kabodjo, is a Congolese ⁣⁣humorist⁣⁣, comedian, storyteller, poet and jurist.

== Biography ==
Joyeux Bin Kabodjo was born November 26, 1995, in Bukavu, capital of South Kivu Province in eastern Zaire. Son of Juwe Kabodjo and Nzigire Kazimbe, he familiarized himself with the world of comedy through French comedians on television and in the theater. At the age of seventeen, he began his artistic career as an animator and sometimes a participant in cultural events in his native town.

In 2014, Joyeux Bin Kabodjo produced his very first show, "La Scène du Paradis Mordu". After that, in 2017 he created "Bukavu Comedy Club", a comedy residency aimed at propelling the new generation of comedians, and launched the very first humor festival in Bukavu, entitled "Zéro Polémik".

From 2017, Joyeux Bin Kabodjo began numerous appearances on the international scene: he was invited to the first edition of Kigingi Summer Comedy in Burundi in July and to the Festival of Nuit des Plaisanteries in Ouagadougou, Burkina Faso, in November 2017. He represents, with Alain Esongo, the Democratic Republic of the Congo in the twelfth season of Le Parlement du rire in Abidjan, Ivory Coast, and participates in the fifth edition of the Africa Stand Up Festival, which was held from October 25 to November 2, 2021, in Douala, Cameroon.

Director of Bukavu Comedy Club since 2017, humorist Joyeux Bin Kabodjo has been appointed as the new ambassador in Bukavu of Africa Stand Up, an association which works for the development of the "stand-up" sector in Africa, by ensuring the detection, training and the accompaniment of young African comedians. He signs a partnership with the Pan-African Stand Up Academy which will allow two local comedians, a man and a woman, each year since 2022, to go to Cameroon to follow training workshops and participate in the Africa Stand Up Festival supported by Canal+ Afrique.

== Filmography ==
=== YouTube series ===
Year	Title	Role	Director	Ref.
2018	Un coup de revers	Joyeux	Spider Prod	
2021	Les Capsules de Takam	Joyeux	Ulrich Takam	

=== Shows ===
Year	Title	Guest	Ref.
2014	Le paradis mordu		
2015	Le nègre n’est pas noir		
2016	La lettre ouverte à Mr avenir		
2017	Que dit le roi		
2017	Les excellences	Philomène Nanema and Espoir Bulangalire	
2018	Les enfants sucrés		
2018	Pourquoi moi…		
2018	Plat du jour		
2018	Journal intime		
2019	L’association des déçus et frustrés électoraux		
2020	CoVigilance-19		
2021	Le caleçon du patron	Espoir Bulangalire	
2022	SocelleRir	RedBienv	

== Awards ==
Year	Nominee / work	Award	Result
2021	Himself	IRD Great Lakes	Won
2022	Himself	African Laughter Awards (ARA)	Nominated

== Participations ==
- 2017: Kigingi Summer Comedy
- 2017: Festival Nuit des Plaisanteries
- 2018: Zéro Polémik Festival
- 2021: Africa Stand Up Festival
- 2021: Le Parlement du rire in Ivory Coast
