= ZZJ Mundovisión =

Defunct Spanish TV channel

ZZJ Mundovisión was a Spanish television channel (based in Dos Hermanas, Seville) for deaf and blind people, and, later, a provider of subtitles for teletext services in Spain. It began in 1997 as a channel on the Vía Digital platform, but shut down in January 1999 and retrenched most of its staff. After this date and until the company's closure in 2002, its services were limited to subtitle provision. Most of its staff consisted of people with a sensory disability.

== History ==
The channel was announced in July 1997, where it was announced as a charter channel on Vía Digital's launch offer. The channel would begin with a four-hour schedule (8pm to 12am), with goals of expanding to a 12 or 16-hour schedule later. It was a subscription channel, each subscription cost 1,000 pesetas.

The channel's programming had heavy use of audio description for blind viewers and subtitles for deaf viewers. The programming schedule was outlined as such: 15% news, 15% educational content and 70% entertainment (movies, TV series, cartoons and telenovelas).

On 22 January 1999, it ceased broadcasting and fired its 41 staff. According to the audiovisual sector, the decision was taken because of Antena 3's contract with ONCE, following the former's acquisition of Onda Cero, in which the group would create a similar channel targeting the same demographic, on the same platform. With this, ZZJ Mundovisión was limited to providing subtitling services for Canal Sur via teletext.

On 17 April 2000, it began providing 1,700 minutes per week of subtitles on Antena 3's teletext service.
