= HiTV =

Nigerian DTT and satellite television service

- Type: Public
- Industry: Satellite television
- Founded: 1 February 2007
- Defunct: 21 November 2011
- Headquarters: Ebute Metta, Lagos, Lagos State, Nigeria
- Products: Direct broadcast satellite
- Parent: Entertainment Highway

High Television (also known as HiTV) was Entertainment Highway's multi-channel digital satellite television service in Nigeria, launched in 2007. It used Hypercable Digital Terrestrial technology and launched Direct to Home (DTH) Satellite technology on the August 1, 2007.

HiTV later broadcast its material only on satellite at the price of N3,500 ($27.73) monthly. It was the first television platform in Africa to deploy Hypercable, a terrestrial pay-per-view TV decoder system.

HiTV services were stopped in November 2011 due to financial difficulties. The company no longer exists.

== See also ==
- List of satellite television service providers in Nigeria

High Television (HiTV): Nigeria’s Bold Satellite TV Venture

High Television, or HiTV, was a pioneering satellite television service launched in Nigeria by Entertainment Highway in 2007. It marked a significant milestone in the African television industry by offering a range of digital channels to viewers, bringing new entertainment experiences to the Nigerian audience. The service initially broadcast on both digital satellite and terrestrial platforms, but over time, it transitioned to a satellite-only service, providing a variety of international and local channels.

One of HiTV's major achievements was its introduction of Hypercable Digital Terrestrial technology. This innovative system allowed for an advanced pay-per-view experience, giving viewers the flexibility to select channels and content they preferred without being locked into long-term subscriptions. At the time, this was a game-changer for the African market, as it opened up a more personalized and modern viewing experience.

Despite its early success, HiTV struggled financially and was forced to shut down in November 2011. The company’s downfall was a result of several financial challenges, including competition from established international satellite television providers and difficulties in sustaining operations. HiTV’s closure marked the end of an era for its services, and though the company no longer exists, it remains an important part of Nigeria's broadcasting history, highlighting both the potential and challenges of digital satellite television in Africa.
