= ABC Australia (disambiguation) =

ABC Australia may refer to:

- Australian Broadcasting Corporation (ABC), the national broadcast network in Australia
  - ABC Australia (Asia-Pacific TV channel), a pay-TV channel operated by the ABC
  - ABC Radio (Australian network), the radio network of the ABC
  - ABC Television (Australian network), the television network of the ABC
  - ABC TV (Australian TV channel), an ABC channel, formerly ABC1
