= Le Bouquet Africain =

Le Bouquet Africain is an audiovisual offer with 36 TV channels launched by Thema on the French market in September 2008 in a soft launch with the French telecommunications operator Neuf. As of 2009 some cable and ADSL operators have also offered this bouquet to their subscribers. It is mainly intended in particular for the population originating in French-speaking countries in sub-Saharan Africa.

== History ==
The package is the brainchild of François Thiellet, founder of Thema, former director of MCM and launcher of sister channel MCM Africa, the current Trace TV. Thiellet noted that, following the rise of IPTV operators and the diversification to cater more diasporas in France (Russian, Turkish, etc.), the African diaspora was left out. To this end, thanks to cooperation with Canal Overseas Africa as a technical and editorial partner, Le Bouquet Africain launched in September 2008 with six channels.

The initial package consisted of channels from the African countries with the highest diaspora in France: RTS1 and 2sTV from Senegal, RTI 1 from the Ivory Coast, ORTM from Mali and CRTV from Cameroon, as well as an "unusual" addition, RTB from Burkina Faso. This last channel was selected due to Thiellet's particular fondness for the country, considered to be the "cradle of African fiction", its production of feature films and for housing FESPACO every two years.

On 16 October 2012, Nollywood TV launched, the first Thema-owned channel to be on the package. The channel broadcasts French dubs of Nollywood movies.

In 2022, it added Dorcel TV Africa, an adult channel, on Bouygues Telecom.

== Distribution ==
The offer is available in France, Belgium and Canada via the following operators:

=== France ===
- Bouygues Telecom
- Free
- Numericable
- Orange
- SFR TV

=== Belgium ===
A reduced package was made available on Numéricable in Brussels in the early 2010s and was absorbed by Telenet upon its acquisition of SFR Belgium. In September 2024, Telenet announced the discontinuation of the package on 1 December 2024. The channels available at closing time were mostly Congolese: Nollywood TV, RTNC, CRTV, Télé Congo, B-One and A+.

=== Canada ===
- Bell Fibe TV

== Programming ==
Currently, Le Bouquet Africain offers up to 36 channels. The offer varies depending on the provider. Certain programming (especially sporting events) are blocked due to rights issues.

=== Pan-African ===
- A+
- Africable
- CDirect (DRC-Republic of Congo)
- Dorcel TV Africa
- Gospel Music TV
- Maïsha TV
- Mandéka
- Novelas TV
- Nollywood TV
- Nollywood TV Epic
- Pulaagu
- Trace Africa
- Trace Gospel

=== Benin ===
- Golfe TV Africa
- ORTB

=== Burkina Faso ===
- Radio Télévision du Burkina

=== Cameroon ===
- Cameroon Radio Television
- Canal 2 International
- Equinox TV
- STV2

=== Congo Brazzaville ===
- Télé Congo

=== Côte d'Ivoire ===
- Ivoire TV Music
- La Première (RTI)
- LMTV
- Notre Côte d'Ivoire

=== Democratic Republic of the Congo ===
- Antenne A
- b-one Télévision
- Maboke TV
- RTNC

=== Gabon ===
- Gabon 24
- Gabon Télévision

=== Guinea ===
- Espace TV
- Kalac TV
- La Guinée Fé
- Radio Télévision Guinéenne

=== Mali ===
- Cherifla TV
- ORTM

=== Senegal ===
- 2sTV
- RTS 1
- SEN TV
- Sunu Yeuf
- TFM

=== Togo ===
- Télévision Togolaise
