= Canal+ Décalé =

French pay television channel

- Country: France
- Broadcast area: France; Switzerland
- Headquarters: Issy-les-Moulineaux

Programming
- Language(s): French
- Picture format: 576i (SDTV); 1080i (HDTV)

Ownership
- Owner: Groupe Canal+

History
- Launched: 5 March 2005
- Closed: 29 August 2022
- Replaced by: Canal+ Sport 360
- Former names: Canal+ Bleu (1996–2003); Canal+ Confort (2003–2005)

Canal+ Décalé was a French pay-television channel. Part of Canal+, "Décalé'" means 'staggered', and was an overflow network carrying mainly event programming which could not be contained to Canal+'s regular networks, along with replays of that programming.

== History ==
Canal+ Bleu launched on 27 April 1996, on satellite and cable as a programme multicast of Canal+ films.

As part of the creation of the Canal+ Bouquet, the channel changed its name on 1 November 2003 to Canal+ Confort. It changed to its present name on 2005 to become Canal + Décalé.

The channel started broadcasting its programmes in high definition on 12 October 2010.

Canal+ Décalé is used for pop-up channels for many events, like Canal+ Rio 2016 (in the 2016 Olympic Games) and Canal+ Tennis (every year for the BNP Paribas Masters).

On 29 August 2022, Canal+ Décalé was closed down and replaced by Canal+ Sport 360 two days later.

== Logo history ==
Canal+ Décalé first logo from 2005 to 2006.

Canal+ Décalé second logo from 2006 to 2009.

Canal+ Décalé third logo from 2009 to 2013.

Canal+ Décalé final logo from 2013 to 2023.

== See also ==
- Canal+
- Canal+ Séries
- Canal+ Family
- Canal+ Sport
- Canal+ Cinéma
