= Canal+ Calédonie =

Satellite TV service

Canal+ Calédonie, originally called Canal Satellite Nouvelle-Calédonie and CanalSat Calédonie, is a satellite provider based in the Overseas French Department of New Caledonia and Wallis and Futuna, and with reduced offers in Vanuatu. It was launched in 1999 to distribute satellite television to the region. It offers 48 C=channels, four radio stations and eight international channels. It broadcasts using the Intelsat 701 Satellite at 180 degrees east.

== Channels ==
=== Canal+ ===
- Canal+ Calédonie
- Canal+ Cinéma(s)
- Canal+ Sport
- Canal+ Kids
- Canal+ Séries
- Canal+ Docs
- Canal+ Kids
- Canal+ Grand Écran
- Canal+ Sport 360
- Canal+ Foot
- Canal+ Box Office

=== France Télévisions ===
- Nouvelle-Calédonie 1ère
- Wallis et Futuna 1ère
- France 2
- France 3
- France 4
- France 5
- France Info

=== General entertainment ===
- TF1
- M6
- TV5 Monde
- Arte
- TMC
- TFX
- TF1 Séries Films
- Canal+ Séries

=== Cinéma ===
- Canal+ Cinéma(s)
- Canal+ Box Office
- Canal+ Grand Écran
- OCS
- Action
- Ciné + Frisson
- Ciné + Émotion
- Ciné + Famiz
- Ciné + Festival
- Ciné + Classic
- Canal Hollywood
- TCM Cinéma

==== Adult ====
- XXL

=== Sport ===
- Canal+ Sport
- Canal+ Sport 360
- Canal+ Foot
- Eurosport 1
- Eurosport 2
- L'Équipe TV
- Motorsport.tv
- Infosport+

=== Children ===
- Canal+ Kids
- TiJi
- Gulli
- Canal J
- Télétoon+
- Télétoon+1
- Piwi+
- Nickelodeon

=== Entertainment ===
- RTL9
- Téva
- Planète+ Aventure
- SyFy
- Comédie+
- W9
- 6ter
- RMC Story
- RMC Life

=== Music ===
- MCM Top
- MCM Pop
- Mezzo TV
- Trace Urban
- RFM TV
- MTV Hits
- MTV Hits (HD)
- M6 Music
- NRJ Hits
- CStar
- CStar Hits France

=== Documentaries ===
- Canal+ Docs
- Planète+
- National Geographic
- Seasons
- Histoire

=== News ===
- LCI
- EuroNews

== Radio stations ==
- Europe 1
- France Info
- Fréquence Jazz
- RFM

== See also ==
- Canal+ Group
- Canal+ (French TV provider)
- Canal+ Afrique
- Canal+ Caraïbes
