= Stella Taaroamea =

Stella Taaroamea (born 1969 or 1970) is a French Polynesian journalist and broadcaster who is editor-in-chief of Polynésie la 1ère.

Taaroamea was born in Papeete. She became a freelancer for RFO in 1990, and in 1991 became presenter of the Reo Tahiti television news program Vea. From 2009 to 2015 she was deputy editor-in chief, then head of news from 2015 to 2021. She served as acting editor-in-chief in 2017 following the departure of Jean-Philippe Lemée.

In March 2021 she was appointed editor-in-chief of Polynésie la 1ère, becoming the first Polynesian to hold the position.
