= ABC Australia (Asia-Pacific TV channel) =

Asia-Pacific pay television channel

- Country: Australia
- Broadcast area: Asia, Pacific Islands
- Network: ABC Television
- Headquarters: Sydney; Melbourne

Programming
- Languages: English (primary), Chinese, Indonesian, Tok Pisin
- Picture format: 1080i HDTV (downscaled to 16:9 576i/480i for the SDTV feed)

Ownership
- Owner: Australian Government
- Parent: Australian Broadcasting Corporation

History
- Launched: 17 February 1993; 33 years ago as Australia Television International
- Former names: Australia Television International (1993–2001); ABC Asia Pacific (2002–2006); Australia Network (2006–2014); Australia Plus (2014–2018)

Links
- Website: ABC Asia (Asia–Pacific); ABC Pacific (Pacific)

Availability

Terrestrial
- Sky Pacific

Streaming media
- Malaysia Astro: Astro GO
- Malaysia Unifi TV: play@unifi
- Indonesia Vidio: Watch live
- India Jio TV
- ABC iview Australia app (only available outside Australia)

ABC Australia, formerly Australia Television International (or just Australia Television), ABC Asia Pacific, Australia Network and Australia Plus, is an Australian pay television channel, launched in 1993 and operated by the Australian Broadcasting Corporation as part of the ABC television network of services. The channel broadcasts a mix of programming, including lifestyle, drama, sports, English-language learning programs, children's programming and news and current affairs to viewers across East Asia, South Asia, Southeast Asia and Pacific Islands.

It is partially funded by Australia's Department of Foreign Affairs & Trade, as well as some advertising (unlike the ABC's domestic television services).

== History ==
=== Origins ===
Radio Australia had been operating as part of the ABC since 1939 while the passing of the Australian Broadcasting Corporation Act 1983 allowed the corporation to operate an additional international television service. The channel was originally proposed by directors Mark Armstrong and David Hill, who felt that a television channel would further heighten Australia's presence in the Asia-Pacific region and demonstrate the ABC's technical abilities.

Prime Minister Paul Keating launched Australia Television International on 17 February 1993, televised live to 50 countries in the south-east Asian region, from the ABC's television studios in Gore Hill, Sydney. The actual broadcast was from the Darwin uplink where Dominic Stone, the service's Program Director and David Hill, managing director of the ABC commissioned the first transmission. The establishment of the new channel was funded by a special government grant of A$5.4 million. It was originally a part of the so-called "Gang of Five", which was a consortium that was set up to compete against Star TV in the region. (The others in the group were CNN International, HBO, ESPN International [with its Asian operations] and TVB [with TVB Superchannel]) The consortium's channels were initially transmitted via Palapa satellite, but were later also added to Apstar satellite.

The operation of the new channel was funded by a combination of government subsidies and commercial sponsorship. The presence of commercials, not previously seen or heard on the ABC, resulted in the creation of an updated edition of the ABC Editorial and Programme Practices, stipulating that the "Australia Television service will retain editorial control and independence in all programming".

Funding cuts made in the 1997–1998 federal budget, and recommendations made in the Mansfield Report, meant that control of Australia Television was handed over to the Seven Network in 1998. Under Seven's direction the channel continued to receive federal funding, and carry some ABC News.

=== 2002–2006: ABC Asia Pacific ===
Despite efforts made by Seven to expand into Asia using the service, it continued to lose money. In 2001, the government announced a five-year, A$50-million tender for the service – at the time watched primarily by Australian expatriates for its news programmes, football coverage, and children's programming. Seven chose not to bid, while Imparja Television's application was unsuccessful. The ABC won the contract and Australia Television was rebranded as ABC Asia Pacific on 1 January 2002 (31 December 2001 by some sources), with content from the Seven Network, Nine Network, Network Ten, and the ABC's own original content, as well as news bulletins produced by Sky News Australia.

The tender was renewed in 2005; the ABC was re-awarded control of the service until 8 August 2011, over other applicants including Sky News Australia. Soon afterwards, the network stopped showing content from Sky News Australia, replaced with bulletins produced by the ABC's own news and current affairs division from its Southbank studios in Melbourne.

=== 2006–2014: Australia Network ===
ABC Asia Pacific changed its name to Australia Network on 7 August 2006, at the same time introducing a number of new programs, as well as the expansion of its existing news programs and English-language learning programs. Following a restructure of the ABC in early 2007, Australia Network became a part of the corporation's International, Corporate Strategy and Governance division.

The channel was not available in Australia or New Zealand, owing to rights restrictions, although ABC News for Australia Network bulletins were carried overnight on ABC News 24 and Al Jazeera English in Australia and on Face TV in New Zealand. Several Australia Network programmes are also available online in Australia on the ABC's iview platform. Australia Network became available in Malaysia on Astro (Channel 514) in December 2008.

In 2010 the Rudd government invited media organisations to submit tenders to deliver the Australia Network for 10 years. In November 2011, the Government closed the tender, "due to significant leaks of confidential information to the media", and asked the Australian Federal Police to investigate. In the meantime, the ABC's contract was extended until August 2012 to allow time for a decision to be made on its future. On 5 December 2011, the Government announced that the Australia Network would no longer be open to tender and that the ABC would take over its operations permanently. Concerns were raised about the process, and the Australian National Audit Office noted that the tender process "presented the Australian Government in a poor light and cost the two tenderers... time and money". The government was obliged to pay millions in compensation to Sky News.

In the 2014–2015 Australian federal budget by the Abbott government, all funding to the Australia Network was cut and its closure was announced, days before it was about to sign a contract with Shanghai Media Holdings to begin broadcasting in China (making it only the third foreign broadcaster with access to the country). 80 jobs, mostly in Melbourne, were lost and the government was forced to compensate the ABC A$10.6 million for breaking its contract, which had been promised A$196.8 million in funding for ten years of operation by the previous Labor government.

=== 2014–2018: Australia Plus ===
Following the closure of Australia Network, Australia Plus, a new multi-platform international service was launched on 29 September 2014 as a replacement. The channel continued to broadcast entertainment, sports, education and English learning shows from ABC through Asia and Pacific partners. Big events from Australia, such as Melbourne Cup, Sydney's New Year's Eve Fireworks and the Sydney to Hobart Yacht Race were also featured on the channel.

In 2015, the New Zealand government established Pasifika TV, a service providing Pacific island broadcasters with a 24/7 feed of sport, news and other content. Most of it is from New Zealand.

In August 2016, three commercial partners, the Government of Victoria, vitamin and supplement company Swisse and Monash University signed contracts with Australia Plus. Under the Australian Broadcasting Corporation Act 1983 the ABC International Division is allowed to operate as a commercial operation, in a way similar to BBC Worldwide.

=== 2018–present: ABC Australia ===
Australia Plus was rebranded as ABC Australia on 1 July 2018. ABC Head of International Strategy David Hua said, “The rebranding of the international television service makes sense to our audiences overseas, who want distinctive Australian content from a highly-respected media organisation.” The rebranding came just weeks after the lifting of the geo-blocking of the ABC News live stream on the ABC website and YouTube channels.

In 2020, the Australian Government established PacificAus TV, which offers 1000 hours of free Australian commercial TV each year to Pacific island broadcasters.

In October 2023, the channel established separate schedules for Asia and the Pacific.

== Description ==
The channel broadcasts a mix of programming, including lifestyle, drama, sports, English-language learning programs, children's programming and news and current affairs. The service is available via subscription to viewers across East Asia, South Asia, Southeast Asia and Pacific Islands, including India, Japan, Vietnam, Afghanistan, the Philippines, Papua New Guinea and Vanuatu.

=== Programming ===
In addition to those listed below, the now rebadged ABC Australia shows a range of programming targeted at audiences within the region, including evening news bulletins at two-hour intervals targeted at different parts of the region, and a number of English-language educational programs produced by the Network including Study English, Living English, English Bites and The Business of English. Drama series shown include Home and Away, Offspring, Packed to the Rafters, Rake, The Doctor Blake Mysteries, The Time of Our Lives, factual entertainment programs Bondi Vet, One Plus One (TV program), and Cosmo Times, lifestyle programs Big Break, Food Safari and Poh's Kitchen, music program Rage, light entertainment programs Gruen Planet, Good Game and Good Game SP, the children's shows Play School, Blue Water High, Totally Wild, A gURLs wURLd, and Scope.

The news programming of the channel is produced and broadcast from the news studios in Sydney, the headquarters of the ABC News channel and the network news service.

== Broadcasters ==
Update of 2025

Country	Broadcaster(s)
Afghanistan	Ariana Television Network
Brunei	Satellite Receive
Cambodia	SingMeng Telemedia, WeWatch
Cook Islands	Cook Islands Television, Niu TV Limited, Sky Pacific
East Timor	Rádio e Televisão de Timor-Leste, RaphVision Electrics Unipessoal Lda
Fiji	Fiji Broadcasting Corporation, Fiji TV, Mai TV, Sky Pacific
French Polynesia	Sky Pacific
Hong Kong	PCCW
India	Jio TV, Jio TV+, Tata Play and several other
Indonesia	MNC Vision, PT Biznet Multimedia, PT Digital Sarana Bersama, PT LinkNet, PT Telkom, Transvision, Vidio, VNT Networks
Japan	Aruji Co Ltd, Japan Cable Cast Inc., NHK, SET International, Tokyo Cable Network, World on Demand, Wowow
Kiribati	Sky Pacific
Macau	Macau Cable TV Ltd
Malaysia	Astro, Enjoy TV, Long TV, Unifi TV
Maldives	SS Net TV, Medianet Pvt Ltd
Mongolia	Skytel, Unitel
Nauru	Canal+ Calédonie, GoTV, Sky Pacific
Nepal	Net TV
New Caledonia	Canal+ Calédonie, GoTV, InternetNC
Niue	Sky Pacific, Television Niue
Palau	Palau National Communication Corporation
Papua New Guinea	Click TV, Digicel, Hitron, Media Niugini Limited, National Broadcasting Corporation of PNG, Sky Pacific
Philippines	Asian Vision Cable Holdings, Cignal Digital TV, Kalibo Cable TV, SkyCable Corporation
Samoa	Digicel, Moana TV, Samoa Broadcasting Corporation, Sky Pacific
Singapore	Singtel Global Private Ltd, StarHub Cable Vision Ltd
Solomon Islands	Satsol TV, Solomon Telekom Company Limited
South Korea	D'Live, Olleh TV, Seokyung Cable Television, Ulsan Joongang Cable Network Co Ltd
Sri Lanka	ASK Cable Network, Dialog TV, PEO TV
Taiwan	Digidom, Hulien Cable TV, T.Y Cable TV, Tai Tung Cable TV, Tung Tai Cable Television
Thailand	Triple T Network Co. Ltd., TrueVisions Group Company Ltd
Tokelau	Sky Pacific
Tonga	Digicel, Sky Pacific, Tonga Broadcasting Corporation
Tuvalu	Sky Pacific
Vanuatu	Canal+ Calédonie, Digicel, Sky Pacific, Telsat Pacific, Vanuatu Broadcasting & Television Corporation
Vietnam	Viettel Telecom (TV360), VNPT (MyTV), FPT Telecom (FPT Play), VTVcab, SCTV, AVG
Wallis and Futuna	Canal+ Calédonie

== Funding ==
ABC Australia is partially funded by Australia's Department of Foreign Affairs & Trade, as well as some advertising (unlike the ABC's domestic television services).

Along with the rest of the ABC, the channel has suffered from successive funding cuts, particularly under Liberal governments since the 1996 Howard government, with particularly deep cuts in 2014 under the Abbott government and an ongoing indexation freeze as of 2021.

In 2019, the ABC's budget for all international operations was A$11 million, at the same level as it was in the 1980s. This compares with the A$3 billion allocated to China Central Television (CCTV) service, and A$500 million for the BBC's international services.

== Other ABC international services ==
ABC Radio Australia was launched in 1939, and continues to broadcast in the Asia-Pacific region although no longer on short-wave transmission, so does not reach all of the remote islands.

The ABC has increased its Internet presence for international audiences; the iview streaming service is available via an app, and ABC News Online includes Chinese-language and Tok Pisin articles.

ABC Pacific is the ABC's new digital home for the best Pacific Islands content from across the ABC website since 2022.

== Slogan history ==
- Everyone's ABC Asia Pacific (2002–2006)
- A different view (Australia Network, 2006–2010)
- From our world to yours (Australia Network, 2010–2014)
- Your World, Our World, One World (Australia Plus, 2014–2018)
- Yours (2018–present)

== See also ==
- Australian Broadcasting Corporation
- History of the Australian Broadcasting Corporation
- Radio Australia
