= Vía Digital =

Spanish satellite television provider

DTS, Distribuidora de Television por Satélite S.A.
- Trade name: Vía Digital
- Type: Sociedad Anónima
- Industry: Satellite broadcasting
- Founded: 15 September 1997
- Defunct: 21 July 2003
- Fate: Merger
- Successor: Digital+
- Headquarters: Pozuelo de Alarcón, Spain
- Area served: Nationwide
- Products: Pay television
- Parent: Telefónica, S.A.

DTS Distribuidora de Televisión por Satélite S. A., dba Vía Digital, was a subscription satellite television platform that operated in Spain and Andorra through the Hispasat satellite. It was owned by Telefónica from its creation in 1997 up to its closure in 2003, when it merged with rival provider Canal Satélite Digital —owned by Grupo Prisa— to create the Digital+ platform.

== History ==
=== Background ===
Vía Digital's development is connected to the development of subscription television in Spain. In 1995, Jesús de Polanco's Sogecable group had inked an agreement with Telefónica to develop a new digital cable platform named Cablevisión. However, the European Commission rejected the project because it considered to be a national pay-TV monopoly.

One year later, Telefónica, whose presidency fell upon Juan Villalonga, began its own satellite television project which intended to directly compete with Sogecable. Test broadcasts began in August 1996 through the Hispasat satellite. Villalonga's idea was supported by the new Spanish government, presided since 1996 by José María Aznar, to whom he was interested to create a media conglomerate that competed facing Grupo Prisa's influence, closer to the center-left. Unlike what happened with terrestrial television, the Satellite Television Law of the time required only one administrative authorization.

On 31 January 1997, a new company, Distribuidora de Televisión por Satélite (DTS), was created, where Telefónica was its largest shareholder with 35% of the shares; the remaining shareholders were Radiotelevisión Española (25%), Mexican media giant Televisa (25%), several autonomous channels of the FORTA network (EPRTVM, CRTVG and RTVV) and other groups with symbolic participation. Its first president was producer Pedro Pérez Fernández de la Puente. With an initial capital of ten million pesetas, it aspired to surpass the one million subscriber milestone in three years. Later, other shareholders such as Organización Cisneros (from Venezuela) and Televisió de Catalunya joined, because, according to the Television Law, no company could have over 25% of shares.

Since its launch, Telefónica faced Sogecable's experience, as a pioneer in subscription television with Canal+ (1990) and the analog satellite platform Canal Satélite (1994). The turning point were the rights to the Spanish football league, which in the 1996-97 season were owned by Canal+, FORTA and Antena 3 (at the time controlled by Antonio Asensio's Grupo Zeta). Telefónica had contacted Asensio in order to allow Antena 3 to enter Vía Digital's shareholder structure, since, at the time, it was facing confrontation with Canal+. However, on 24 December 1996, a surprise agreement between Polanco and Asensio took place to create a joint sports rights company, Audiovisual Sport, whch was shared between Sogecable (40%), Gestora de Medios Audiovisuales (40%, owned by Asensio) and Catalan Radiotelevision (20%). The pacto de Nochebuena (Christmas Eve Pact, named on the date of its signing) left Telefónica without the key attractive product to catch subscribers, but also without the support Asensio had initially.

Likewise, Sogecable was ahead of Telefónica in its launch date: it launched Canal Satélite Digital (CSD) on 31 January 1997, with an initial 25-channel offer as well as exclusive film and sports agreements.

=== Launch (1997) ===
After months of planning, DTS presented the Vía Digital platform in May 1997, whose broadcasts started on 15 September 1997. Its initial offer consisted of a basic package of 35 channels for 2500 pesetas per month, which was supplemented by additional theme packages. To this payment, 1000 pesetas for the renting of the decoder and a single payment of 5000 pesetas for installing had to be added. Under the slogan la televisión personal (Personal Television), it also offered an electronic program guide, pay-per-view services and future interactive services. Vía Digital used the Hispasat satellite, unlike CSD which used SES Astra, and in its early weeks, it broadcast its package free-to-air until it employed its encryption system.

In July 1997, two weeks before its official launch, Telefónica was now in charge of Antena 3 through the acquisition of Antonio Asensio's shares. The agreement also implied that it would control 49% of Gestora de Medios Audiovisuales (GMA), the company that had Asensio's participation in Audiovisual Sport, for which Telefónica could negotiate the rights for football matches. Facing this situation, Vía's programming line-up was very limited because of CSD's exclusivity agreements with the US movie majors, and with the major sports leagues of the United States. Regarding movie rights, it negotiated with Spanish companies and producers —Lauren Films, Lolafilms, Enrique Cerezo— and independent cinema. Regarding sports, it shared rights with RTVE, among them the UEFA Champions League. On the other hand, it signed an exclusive agreement with Plaza de Toros de Las Ventas to provide bullfighting.

The measures adopted by Aznar's government to regulate digital television heightened competition between CSD and Vía Digital. The first was related with decoders: Vía employed the multicrypt system while CSD employed simulcrypt, a more restricted standard. On 31 January 1997, one day after the launch of CSD, the government approved a decree-law which demanded decoders that were "compatible with each other" and prioritized multicrypt as a universal system, which directly benefitted Vía Digital. The government made a cession by enabling both systems in 1998, but Sogecable presented an appeal against the decree and the Supreme Court gave it a positive result in 2002. The other controversial aspect was the passing of Law 21/1997, nicknamed Ley Cascos, which considered football to be of public interest and obliged the airing of at least one Primera División match per matchweek.

Although Telefónica was a shareholder in Audiovisual Sport through GMA, Sogecable denied to share pay-per-view football rights because it considered the exclusive rights to be theirs. Negotiations between both parties did not prosper, and at the start of the first week of the 1997-98 season, in which the new system debuted, GMA put a halt to the broadcast of two matches. All of this motivated CSD to interrupt its pay-per-view broadcasts while the courts solved the conflict. The "football war" was solved on 17 November 1997 with a shared agreement: CSD and Vía Digital would relay the Spanish football league "under equal conditions", meaning that the rights would be explored through Audiovisual Sport, and the autonomous channels selected the free-to-air terrestrial match until 2003.

The year ended with 80,000 installed units for 200,000 subscribers. A contest for the manufacturer of 500,000 multicrypt units was set to start at the end of December.

=== Development (1998-2001) ===
In late 1999, Vía Digital had 440,000 subscribers, little more than half compared to its rival's 813,000. The offer depended on agreements with distributors (Viacom, AMC) and of the channels produced by its shareholders, among them RTVE —through TVE Temática—, Mediapark, Televisa, Cisneros and Multipark. The strong competition in the digital market was amped up with the appearance of a new paid platform, Quiero TV, over the nascent digital terrestrial network.

Between 1999 and 2000, it opted for its first exclusive rights. The most important of which was the acquisition of the entirety of the 2002 FIFA World Cup from Leo Kirch's Kirch Gruppe, valued at 27 billion pesetas. That same year, it shocked CSD by obtaining the rights to several international football leagues, including the Premier League and Bundesliga, creating the exclusive Fútbol Total channel for this end. On the other hand, it tried to distinguish itself from Canal Satélite Digital with the rights to a novel title: the first season of Gran Hermano, Telecinco's reality show, in 2000, offering a live feed from the inside of the house 24 hours a day through the exclusive channel Universo Gran Hermano, which helped it to surpass the 600,000 subscriber mark at the end of 2000. The platform followed the same strategy with Antena 3's reality shows: El bus (2000) and Estudio de actores (2002).

To reflect the changes, Vía Digital adopted a new brand identity with a new logo and sky blue as its main color.

The same way as CSD relied on Canal+, Vía Digital set up its own exclusive channel, Gran Vía, which began broadcasting in early 1998. Its launch coincided with the arrival of Eurosport, Canal Campero (camping, fishing, hunting), Tribunal TV (legal issues) and Millennium (astrology and esoteric topics) to the platform. In 2001, it changed its concept to become a premium channel specialized in premiere movies, themed programming and key events. Gran Vía had three separate channels and could be subscribed on Vía Digital, Quiero TV and ONO.

Telefónica consolidated itself as majority shareholder in 1999, after RTVE sold its share and the Champions League rights. Villalonga's interest for media led him to create a specific subsidiary, Telefónica Media, which was in control, among others, of the management of the pay-TV platform. At the end of 2001, the number of subscribers reached 806,379, still below CSD's 1,230,000.

=== Financial problems (2002) ===
High programming costs and other factors, such as the pricing war and piracy, led Vía Digital to have losses amounting to over €360 million in 2001.

Although the problems it dragged to were common to the whole pay-TV sector in Spain, Vía's crisis deepened for its exclusive operation of the 2002 World Cup: Telefónica acquired the tournament at a high price compared to Sogecable's competition, but could not make it profitable as the Kirch Group collapse din April 2002, shortly before the tournament started. The tournament's exclusive premium channel (Vía Mundial) had less subscriptions than the ones it predicted due to the live matches airing in the morning (when it was nearing evening in the host countries), and the general interest package —which included the Spanish team's matches and the final— was offered to Antena 3 because the remaining TV companies did no want to buy it at the demanded price.

The arrival of César Alierta to Telefónica's presidency changed the situation. Alierta had reverted some media investments of his predecessor, and in late 2001, solicited a report on Vía Digital's viability. At the same time, some shareholders openly requested a merger with CSD because they considered that there was no market for two paid platforms in Spain.

=== Merger with Canal Satélite Digital ===
On 8 May 2002, Sogecable and Telefónica entered an agreement for the merger between CSD and Vía Digital in a new platform, Digital+. The operation was actually a merger by absortion, where Sogecable would take over its management and Telefónica would abstain from intervening.

The merger took long to complete because of the report by the National Competition Commission's Competition Defense Tribunal. In November 2002, the Council of Ministers approved the absortion under several conditions, among them limits on film and sports rights. In addition, Telefónica would withdraw Antena 3's participation because it entered into conflict with Canal+'s share; it ended up selling it to Grupo Planeta in May 2003.

Both groups ratified the new agreement on 29 January 2003 and an injection of capital was approved to capitalize the existind debt. CSD and Vía operated separately until 21 July 2003, the date in which Digital+ started broadcasting.

Digital+, later renamed Canal+, remained under Prisa's control until 2015. That same year, Telefónica acquired the platform for €725 million to merge it with Movistar TV, giving way to the current Movistar Plus+.

== Channels ==
Vía Digital's own channels were produced by companies such as Telefónica Media (Admira), Multicanal, Mediapark, Televisa, Multipark, FORTA among others. Televisión Española was part of it between 1997 and 1999 through TVE Temática. The rest of the offer was composed by theme channels that also aired on Canal Satélite Digital, such as the international channels which were broadcast through Hispasat.

=== Initial offer (1997) ===
- Generalist
  - Telemadrid SAT
  - Televisió de Catalunya Internacional
  - Canal Comunitat Valenciana
  - ETB Sat
  - Galicia Televisión
- Movies
  - Cine Paraíso
  - Canal Alucine
  - Canal Star
- News
  - Canal 24 Horas
  - Canal El Tiempo
  - Conexión Financiera
  - ECO Noticias
  - Telenoticias (FORTA)
- Sports
  - Eurosport
  - Teledeporte
- Entertainment
  - Canal Nostalgia
  - Canal Enciclopedia
  - Ella TV
  - Galavisión
  - Hispavisión
  - Landscape TV
  - Speedvision
  - Outdoor Life
  - Todo Humor
  - Locomotion
  - Travel Channel
- Music
  - Canal Clásico
  - Ritmosón Latino
  - Telehit
- Kids and youth
  - Canal Panda
  - Club Super 3

=== Final offer (2003) ===
- Own channels
  - Gran Vía
  - Gran Vía 2
  - Gran Vía 3
  - Palco (pay-per-view)
- Generalist
  - Antena 3
  - Andalucía TV
  - Andalucía Turismo
  - Telemadrid SAT
  - Televisió de Catalunya Internacional
  - Canal Comunitat Valenciana
  - ETB Sat
  - Galicia Televisión
- News
  - Antena 3 Noticias
  - Canal 24 Horas
  - Euronews
  - Expansión TV
- Sports
  - Fútbol Total (premium)
  - Teledeporte
  - Eurosport
  - Canal Barça (premium)
- Movies
  - Canal 18
  - Canal Hollywood
  - Canal Star
  - Cine 600
  - Cinematk
  - Showtime Extreme
- Documentaries
  - Canal Campero
  - Canal Cultura
  - Canal Historia
  - Grandes Documentales Hispavisión
  - Natura
  - Odisea
- Entertainment
  - Canal Nostalgia
  - Canal Cocina
  - Cosmopolitan
  - Factoría de Ficción
  - Hallmark Channel
  - Locomotion
  - TLNovelas
- Kids and youth
  - Club Super 3 / Buzz
  - Canal Megatrix
  - Canal Panda
  - Fox Kids
- theme channels
  - Beca TV (education)
  - Red 2000 (technology)
  - Tribunal TV

== Services ==
Vía Digital's offer was distributed in theme packages. Its Básico (Basic) package had over 35 television channels, including movies, sports, music, children's programming, documentaries and autonomous channels. Upon subscribing it, a Premium package with the generalist channel Gran Vía, a specific movie package (Cine Temático) and à la carte channels could be subscribed.

=== Cine Temático ===
The Cine Temático (Themed Cinema) package cost 995 pesetas per month and was originally composed of six channels: Cine 600 (Spanish cinema), Club Cinema (classic American movies), Boulevard (romance movies), Cine Palace (action movies), Canal 18 (erotic and terror films) and Cinematk (independent movies). The launch of Showtime Extreme —jointly managed between Showtime and Mediapark— led to the closure of Boulevard, Club Cinema y Cine Palace.

=== Premiere ===
Vía Digital's premium package included generalist channel Gran Vía, sports rights such as the UEFA Champions League and 24-hour reality channels such as Gran Hermano, El Bus and Estudio de Actores. The initial price of this service was 1000 pesetas per month.

Regular broadcasts started in early 1998 with a daily movie at 10pm, which was either a premiere or a recent title.

Gran Vía even had three specific channels. Its programming consisted in premiere movies, sporting events such as the UEFA Champions League, bullfighting, boxing, tennis tournaments and original programming such as La vía Navarro (presented by Pepe Navarro). The channel was produced by Telson Servicios Audiovisuales.

=== Subscription channels ===
Vía Digital had theme channels that could be subscribed separately and not adjoined to any package: Fútbol Total (international football, 1495 pesetas), Canal Barça (the latest happenings at FC Barcelona, 750 pesetas) and Playboy TV (erotic movies, 1495 pesetas). During the 2002 FIFA World Cup, all matches of the event aired on the Vía Mundial channel.

=== Pay-per-view ===
The pay-per-view (PPV) system was named Palco (Stage) and aired live matches of the Spanish football league, bullfighting and premiere movies. The initial cost was 500 pesetas per movie and 1000 pesetas per event. The channel was broadcast simultaneously for all users, meaning that viewers had to wait for the start of the program. The channel's continuity featured a cinema room which was gradually being full as the start of the broadcast neared.

Vía Digital also had specific rooms for pornographic films (Palco X), among them the first given to homosexual films (Palco X Gay).

=== Interactive television ===
Vía Digital was one of the first Spanish companies to provide interactive television services, accessible through the decoder.

In 1999, it launched a banking service which enabled the user to do transfers, check the bank account or even buy tickets for events. The first entities that joined this initiative were Argentaria, Banco Bilbao Vizcaya and La Caixa. Over time, more services were added such as weather information, subscription games (Ludi TV/Playin' TV), traffic information, e-mail, sending of text messages to Movistar's cell phones, business information, sports results and interactive advertisements to access to Vía Digital's premium services.

Multi-screen services were used for special channels such as Gran Hermano, El Bus and those who had access to football matches (Champions League and World Cup).

== Shareholders ==
=== Creation of Vía Digital (1997) ===
- Telefónica: 35%
- TVE Temática: 25,45%
- Televisa: 25,45%
- Recoletos: 5%
- Telemadrid: 4%
- Canal Nou: 2%
- Televisión de Galicia: 2%
- Other shareholders (COPE, Unidad Editorial, Promociones Periodísticas Leonesas, Las Provincias y Época): 1,1%

Source: El País.

=== At the time of the merger with CSD (2002) ===
- Telefónica: 48,6%
- Strategy Money Management: 18,8%
- Televisa: 10%
- Grupo Cisneros: 6,9%
- RTL Group: 5%
- Mediapark: 5%
- Telemadrid: 1,9%
- Televisió de Catalunya: 1,8%
- Canal Nou: 1,1%
- Televisión de Galicia: 0,5%

Source: El País.

== Bibliography ==
- García Cruz, Rosario; García de Madariaga, Jesús (2000). "Capítulo 4: El sistema de información del márketing internacional, la segmentación y el posicionamiento transnacional". Empresas españolas en los mercados internacionales. Escuela Superior de Gestión Comercial y Márketing. ISBN 978-84-7356-256-0.
