= Nollywood TV =

- Country: France
- Network: Les Bouquets Canal+
- Headquarters: Paris, France

Programming
- Language: French
- Picture format: 576i (16:9 SDTV); 1080i (HDTV)

Ownership
- Owner: Canal+ S.A.
- Sister channels: Novelas+

History
- Launched: 5 October 2012; 13 years ago

Links
- Website: www.nollywoodtv.fr

Nollywood TV is the first French-speaking television channel dedicated to Nigerian cinema, also called Nollywood. The films are entirely full dubbed in French and not simply subtitled.

== History ==
Created by Thema in 2012, Nollywood TV has 750 hours of cinematographic programs, originating from the South African television channel Africa Magic (M-Net/MultiChoice group). The channel broadcasts French-dubbed Nigerian productions from Africa Magic.

== Distribution ==
The channel is distributed within the Le Bouquet Africain at Free since 5 October 2012, via SFR TV since 12 December 2012, Orange since 4 April 2013, Numericable since 10 June 2013, CanalSat Afrique since 2 April 2013 and CanalSat France since 13 January 2015.
