= Canal+ Séries =

French pay television channel

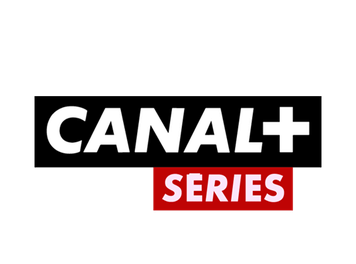
- Country: France
- Broadcast area: France; Switzerland

Programming
- Languages: French, English
- Picture format: 576i (SDTV); 1080i (HDTV)

Ownership
- Owner: Canal+

History
- Launched: 21 September 2013; 12 years ago
- Closed: 1 December 2025; 3 months ago

Links
- Website: canalplus.com/series

Canal+ Séries was a French TV channel devoted to programming series. It was part of the Les Chaînes Canal+ or the Ciné-Séries package of Canal+. The channel does not broadcast advertising; it was expected to cease broadcasting on 13 October 2025, but it was postponed to 1 December 2025.

== History ==
In June 2013, Canal+ Group announced that they were creating a new channel named Canal+ Séries for the start of the school year, integrating it into the Canal+ channel services, at no additional cost.

Canal+ Séries had an African version, which was replaced by Canal+ Elles on 15 October 2019.

== Description ==
The channel broadcasts many shows a few days after the American broadcasting (in English with French subtitles), but it also broadcasts series dubbed in French or French series. The channel also broadcasts series from other Canal+ channels (Suburgatory, The Returned, etc.).

The OCS channels have an exclusive contract with HBO, Canal+ Séries broadcasts rerun of HBO series. But in 2017, OCS's contract with HBO became stricter, giving complete exclusivity to OCS.

=== Logo history ===
Canal+ Séries first logo from 2013 to 2023

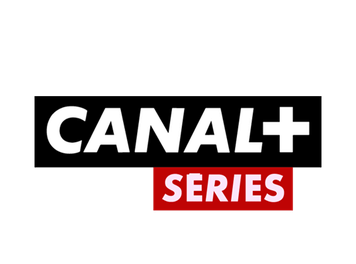
Canal+ Séries second logo from 2023 to 2025

== Final Programming ==
- 24: Live Another Day
- 30 Rock
- The Affair
- The Americans
- American Crime
- American Crime Story
- American Gods (rerun)
- American Horror Story (since season 7, seasons 1–6 in rerun)
- Anger Management
- Arrow (seasons 1–2)
- Atlantis
- Banshee
- The Big Bang Theory
- The Big C
- Braquo
- Bref
- The Bridge - Bron/Broen
- Brooklyn Nine-Nine
- Borgia
- Casual
- Catastrophe
- The Catch
- Damages
- Dexter
- Fear the Walking Dead
- Feud
- Frikjent
- Game of Thrones (Game of Thrones : Le Trône de fer, rerun, seasons 1–5)
- Generation War
- Girls (rerun, seasons 1–4)
- Glue
- Go On
- Halt and Catch Fire
- Hannibal
- Hard
- Hello Ladies (syndication)
- Hit & Miss
- Homeland
- Hostages (Israel)
- House of Cards (U.S, seasons 1–3)
- I Just Want My Pants Back
- In the Flesh
- Kaboul Kitchen
- Killing Eve
- Lascars
- The Last Man on Earth
- Last Resort
- Lilyhammer
- Looking (rerun)
- Luck (rerun)
- Luther
- Mad Men
- Mafiosa
- Maison Close
- Midnight Sun (Jour polaire)
- The Newsroom (rerun)
- Nurse Jackie
- The Office (U.S)
- Parks and Recreation
- Partners
- Platane
- Pose
- Prey
- Ray Donovan
- Republican Gangsters (Baron noir)
- The Returned (Les Revenants, France)
- Revenge
- Royal Pains
- Scandal
- Shameless (U.S, seasons 1–6)
- Skins (U.K)
- Southcliffe
- Spiral (Engrenages)
- The Spoils of Babylon
- Spooks (MI-5)
- Strike Back
- Suburgatory
- Super Fun Night
- The Strain
- This Is Us
- Those Who Kill
- Togetherness
- Trial & Error
- The Tunnel (Tunnel)
- Twin Peaks (rerun)
- Twin Peaks: The Return (Twin Peaks)
- Two and a Half Men (Mon oncle Charlie)
- Utopia (UK)
- Veep (rerun, seasons 1–4)
- Vikings
- Versailles
- Wayward Pines
- Weeds
- WorkinGirls
- World Without End (Un monde sans fin)
- Young Sheldon
- You're the Worst

== See also ==
- Canal+
- Canal+ Cinéma(s)
- Canal+ Kids
- Canal+ Sport
- Canal+ Sport 360
