= Novelas TV =

Novelas+
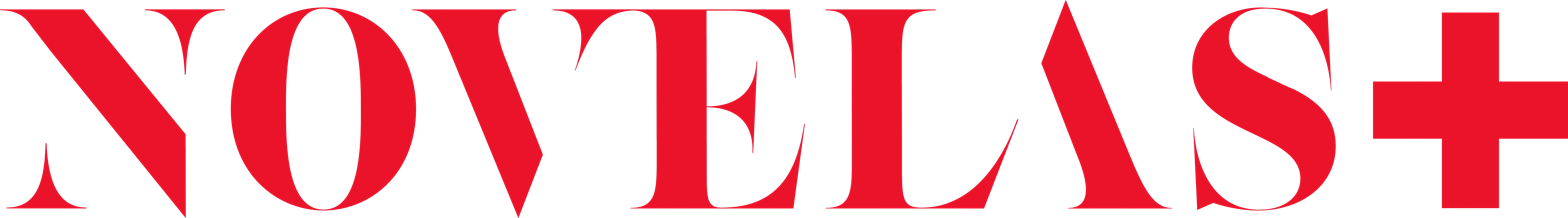
- Country: Sub-Saharan Africa
- Broadcast area: Sub-Saharan Africa; France; Poland
- Network: CANAL+
- Headquarters: Paris, France

Programming
- Languages: French, English, Portuguese, Polish
- Picture format: 576i (16:9 SDTV); 1080i (HDTV)

Ownership
- Owner: Canal+ S.A.
- Sister channels: Nollywood TV

History
- Launched: 14 July 2016; 10 years ago

Links
- Website: www.novelasplus.fr

Novelas+ is an African thematic television channel dedicated to telenovelas broadcasts since 24 March 2015 through Les Bouquets Canal+. It has been available in the Metropolitan France area since 26 September 2017.

== Programming ==
- Corazón valiente
- Cuando seas mía
- El Cuerpo del Deseo
- En otra piel
- Gavilanes
- La casa de al lado
- La Chacala
- La Madrastra
- La Patrona
- Los miserables
- Marimar
- Paloma (Cuando seas mia)
- Rubí
- Santa Diabla
- Şeref Meselesi
- Teresa
- Terra Nostra
- Tierra de reyes
- Un camino hacia el destino
- Una Maid en Manhattan
- Vino el amor
- Yo no creo en los hombres
- "Fatmagùl"

== Distribution ==
Novelas TV is available on channel 23 within the Les Bouquets Canal+ which is distributed in more than 30 Central African and West African countries. Overseas people can watch the channel at La Réunion and in the Caribbeans on channel number 29.

Following the acquisition of MultiChoice by CANAL+ in September 2025, English and Portuguese feeds of the same channel were launched the following year on DStv and GOtv in July. At the same time, Novelas TV rebranded to Novelas+ for French-speaking nations.

Novelas+ also operates in Poland since December 2020.
