= Canal Satélite =

Defunct Spanish satellite television platform

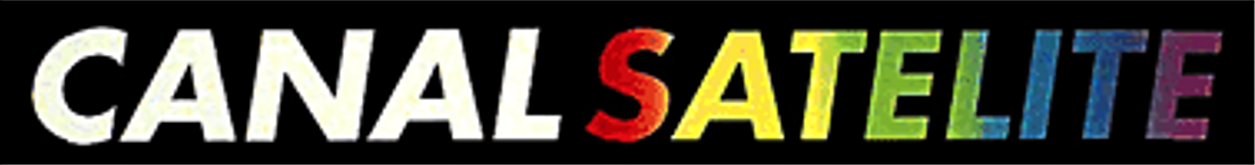
Canal Satélite (pre-1997)

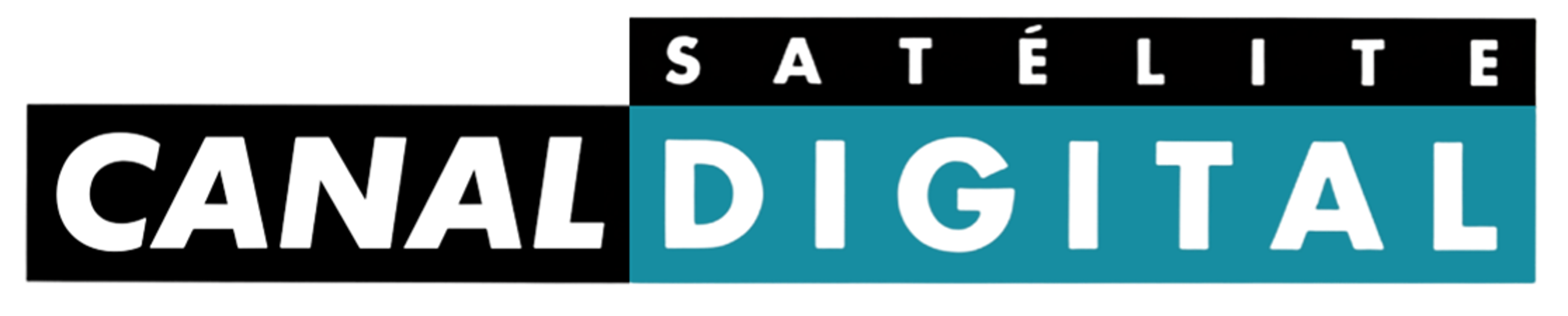
Canal Satélite Digital (post-1997)

Canal Satélite (later, Canal Satélite Digital) was a Spanish satellite television platform, owned by Sogecable, launched on 31 December 1993.

The platform started with a series of channels owned by Sogecable on analog satellite: Cinemanía, Documanía, Cineclassics, Minimax and Sportmanía. On 31 January 1997, the analog platform disappeared, paving way for Canal Satélite Digital, which also included a variety of channels from other companies.

The platform disappeared in 2003, after a merger with Vía Digital, forming Digital+.

== History ==
=== Analog phase ===
Canal Satélite initially consisted of four channels. Cinemanía and Documanía were already broadcasting independently since 1 March 1993, through the Astra 1B satellite, becoming the first Spanish pay-TV theme channels. On 31 December 1993, coinciding with the launch of Canal Satélite, these were joined by two further channels, Minimax and Cineclassics. In 1996, the sports channel Sportmanía joined, increasing the total to five channels.

=== Canal Satélite Digital ===
On 31 January 1997, Canal Satélite Digital launched, anticipating Telefónica's Vía Digital. The service was presented the previous day at the Warner Lusomundo multiplex at La Moraleja in Madrid with the participation of several Spanish movie and music stars.

The service started with the following channels:

- Sportmanía (existing channel)
- Documanía (existing channel)
- Minimax (existing channel)
- Discovery Channel
- Album TV (classic series)
- Canal C: (technology, Spanish version of the French channel)
- Audio (15 Multimúsica themed music playlists, six from Audiomanía and Cadena SER's five music stations: Sinfo Radio, M80, Los 40 Principales, Radiolé and Cadena Dial)
- Mosaic and EPG
- Taquilla (pay-per-view service)
- Canal+ (joined by time-shifted channels Canal+ Azul and Canal+ Rojo)
- Cinemanía, Cinemanía 2 and Cineclassics (to be joined by two further movie channels in September 1997)
- Muzzik
- Multimúsica Clásica (five classical music streams, as well as two jazz streams and one blue stream)
- C:Directo (interactive service)
- Seasons (fishing and hunting)

=== Merger ===
Following the failure of Vía Digital, Sogecable and Telefónica entered an agreement for the merger of both platforms to create Digital+ through a merger by absorption, where Sogecable would continue in control.

Canal Satélite Digital shut down on 21 July 2003, when Digital+ started broadcasting on both Astra (CSD) and Hispasat (Vía Digital) satellites.
