= Canal+ Cinéma(s) =

French television channel

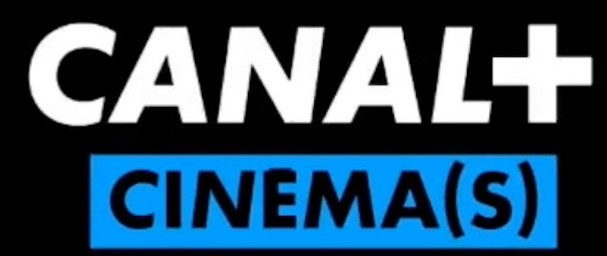
- Country: France
- Broadcast area: France; Switzerland

Programming
- Language: French
- Picture format: 576i (SDTV); 1080i (HDTV)

Ownership
- Owner: Canal+
- Sister channels: Canal+ Grand Écran; Canal+ Box Office

History
- Launched: 27 April 1996; 30 years ago
- Former names: Canal+ Jaune (1996–2003); Canal+ Cinéma (2003–2023)

Links
- Website: canalplus.com/cinema

Canal+ Cinéma(s) (formerly known as Canal+ Jaune and Canal+ Cinema) is a French pay-TV thematic channel that is devoted to movie programming. It belongs to Les Chaînes Canal+ and the Ciné-Séries package of Canal+. It does not broadcast advertising.

Canal+ Cinéma has an African version, on channel 4 of Canal+ Afrique.

== History ==
Originally, the channel launched on 27 April 1996 as "Canal+ Jaune" on CanalSatellite and on cable as a multi-broadcast programme service. Its programmes consisted of a multicast of Canal+ films.

On 28 June 2002, Canal+ Jaune applied to the CSA to obtain a frequency on TNT.

As part of the creation of the Canal+ "Bouquet", the channel changed its name on 1 November 2003 to Canal+ Cinéma. The application was approved and the CSA assigned a frequency on the multiplex R3 DTT from where it begins to be issued as early as 21 November 2005.

Since 12 October 2010, the channel had begun broadcasting their programs in high definition with Canal+ Cinéma launching an HD version of the channel.

On 8 February 2022, Canal+ launched a second movie channel, Canal+ Grand Écran, devoted to the great names in cinema, whether films, actors or directors.

On 1 September 2023, the Canal+ channels changed their logo, along with the launch of Canal+ Box Office, devoted to the biggest recent hits in cinema, and Canal+ Cinéma became Canal+ Cinéma(s), and the latter is focusing on films by major French and foreign directors who have won awards and prizes at international festivals, with films winning prizes at Cannes and the Oscars, for example.

On 5 December 2024, the Canal+ group announced the withdrawal of all its pay-TV channels from DTT from June 2025. This decision concerns Canal+ Cinéma(s) as well as Canal+, Canal+ Sport and Planète+. Long envisaged, this measure has been precipitated by the withdrawal of C8 license by ARCOM, scheduled for 28 February 2025.

== Logo history ==
Canal+ Cinéma second logo from 2005 to 2006.

Canal+ Cinéma third logo from 2006 to 2009.

Canal+ Cinéma fourth logo from 2009 to 2013.

Canal+ Cinéma final logo from 2013 to 2023 and Africa version from 2013 to 2024.

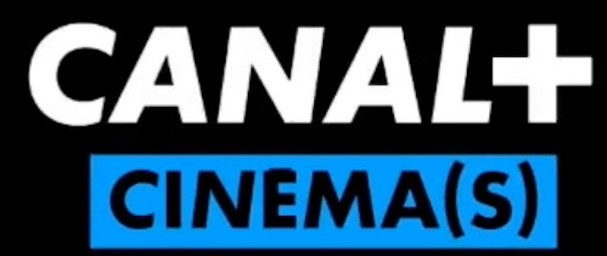
Canal+ Cinéma(s) logo from 2023 to present.

== See also ==
- Canal+
- Canal+ Séries
- Canal+ Kids
- Canal+ Sport
- Canal+ Sport 360
