= Teleclub =

Swiss pay television platform

Teleclub was a brand name of a premium television offering in Switzerland. Founded in 1982, it was one of the longest established providers of such in Europe. Teleclub was a Swiss premium television service founded in 1982. In September 2020, it was rebranded as Blue+ as part of Swisscom's rebranding of its entertainment services. The service is owned by Blue Entertainment AG (formerly known as CT Cinetrade AG), a fully owned subsidiary of telecommunication company Swisscom.

Teleclub provides their services as a stand-alone product through the Swiss DVB-C Television Network via a self-branded Set-top box called "Teleclub Digital Receiver" and a viewing card which is a CI+ NDS VideoGuard Smart Card The two types available are the Kaon and ADB Set Top Boxes, Teleclub also provides their service through alongside other Cable Television and IPTV platforms with exclusive packages for each TV service. In Switzerland Teleclub has agreements with UPC Cablecom and Swisscom TV. Teleclub also provides Video On Demand services (Teleclub On Demand and Teleclub Play) exclusively to the Swisscom TV service.

In 2005, Swisscom acquired a minority share in Teleclub's parent company CT Cinetrade. In May 2013, Swisscom increased its share in CT Cinetrade from 49% to 75%.

At the beginning of 2006, television broadcasting rights for the highest Swiss football and ice hockey league were awarded to Cinetrade and Teleclub for the first time in Switzerland. In 2016 Teleclub extended its contract with the Swiss Super League. Teleclub also shows top matches of the Swiss Challenge League exclusively for Switzerland, as well as all Serie A, Premier League, UEFA Champions League and UEFA Europa League matches. In ice hockey, Teleclub also covers the NHL, the Champions Hockey League, the IIHF World Championship and the Swiss Ice Hockey Cup. Since July 2017, Teleclub has been operating the free TV sports channel Teleclub Zoom with exclusive sports content, live broadcasts, in-house productions and background stories, in German and French.

On 12 September 2012, Teleclub launched its French-language offers especially for Romandy.

In November 2017, Swisscom acquired the remaining share of 25% in CT Cinetrade from its founder Stephan Sager, fully owning Teleclub's parent company.

In July 2020, Swisscom and UPC made an agreement in order to provide their sport bouquets in each of their two competitive networks.

In September 2020, Swisscom announced a major rebrand of its entertainment offerings: this included the renaming of Teleclub as Blue+, and all Teleclub linear channels were renamed to carry Swisscom's Blue brand. The Kitag Cinemas chain of film theatres (a sister operation in CT Cinetrade) became Blue Cinema, as the IPTV service Swisscom TV was also becoming Blue TV. The Blue offers are available in OTT and on different providers including UPC and Sunrise. CT Cinetrade was subsequently renamed Blue Entertainment.
