= Canal+ Afrique =

French subscription TV service

Canal + Afrique logo

Canal+ Afrique, originally Canal+ Horizons or Canal Horizons, is an African version of subscription TV provider Canal+. It was originally available mainly in the francophone countries of Central and West Africa, as well as some non-francophone countries such as Sierra Leone, Nigeria, Ghana, and Cape Verde, but has expanded considerably since its first broadcasts in December 1991. Groupe Canal+ has its biggest market in Africa since its acquisition of South African provider MultiChoice in September 2025.

== History ==
On 18 April 1990, Canal+ Horizons (also referred to as Canal Horizons) was launched as an African subsidiary of the French subscription television service Canal+. Canal+ president André Rousselet headed the organisation from January 1991 until December 1993, when former French communications minister Catherine Tasca was appointed. At that time, channel had 25,998 subscribers, mostly in Tunisia and Senegal. Canal Horizons was modelled on the French Canal+ TV channel, starting its terrestrial broadcasting service in December 1991. In November 1992 it started offering direct-to-home satellite broadcasting, which was capable of reaching the Middle East.

In January 1994, Canal Horizons started broadcasting in the Ivory Coast.

In the 2010s, Canal+ transitioned from the NSS-7 satellite, which provided limited coverage in West Africa, to a new SES-4 satellite, which had reach further south and eastwards towards the Great Lakes. By December 2018, there were 4 million subscribers in Africa, making the Canal+ Group the leading pay TV operator on the continent. By then, it was broadcasting high-definition channels across Africa, even in remote locations. Its reach was around 40% of TV households, with the whole Canal+ Group's offerings including over 200 channels, radio stations, and other services, while the Canal+ Afrique's platform offered more than 50 channels.

On 30 June 2023, the Canal+ Group bought 144.2 million shares (32.6% of the capital) in the South African subscription provider MultiChoice, which, with 20 million subscribers, is the market leader in English and Portuguese-speaking Africa. Their main competitor on the continent is the Chinese-owned StarTimes; however, estimated audience shares by 2028 are 32 million for Canal+/MultiChoice and 19 million for StarTimes.

Canal+ Afrique had 8.1 million subscribers at the end of 2023.

== Description ==
According to Bloomberg, "Canal+ Afrique operates as a TV channel [and] broadcasts cinemas, sports, music, serials, movies, news, discovery programs, and other entertainment activities".

As of May 2024, Canal+ operates in more than 25 countries in Africa through 16 subsidiaries and provides access to over 400 channels. (Note: It is not clear how many of these are under the Canal+ Afrique brand.)

== Channels list ==
=== Les Chaines Canal+ ===
- Canal+ Première
- Canal+ Cinéma
- Canal+ Magic
- Canal+ Action
- Canal+ Family
- Canal+ Docs
- Canal+ Kids
- Canal+ Sport 1
- Canal+ Sport 2
- Canal+ Sport 3
- Canal+ Sport 4
- Canal+ Sport 5

=== Entertainment ===
- TF1
- RTL 9
- France 2
- France 3
- France 5
- M6 International
- Arte
- TMC
- TFX
- Nollywood TV
- Novelas TV
- A+
- WION
- Zee Magic

=== Sport ===
- Infosport+
- W-Sport
- Sport en France
- Automoto la chaîne
- TREK
- NBA TV

=== Children's ===
- Télétoon+
- Piwi+
- Nickelodeon
- Gulli Africa
- TiJi
- Canal J
- Cartoon Network
- Boomerang
- Warner TV Next

=== Indian ===
- DD India
- DD News
- Zee News
- Republic TV
- Star Plus
- Zee TV
- Sony Entertainment Television
- Times Now
- Sony Pix
- Zee Tamil
- Anmol TV

=== Cinema ===
- Paramount TV
- Ciné+ Frisson
- Ciné+ Emotion
- Ciné+ Family
- Ciné+ Festival
- Ciné+ Classic
- OCS
- Action HD
- MN+
- &flix
- Zee Cinema
- Sony Max
- DD National
- Star Gold

=== Music ===
- 9XO
- Zing
- MTV Bets
- 9XM
- M Tune
- Music Now

=== DStv ===
CANAL+ offers an English-dedicated add-on package (English Plus) courtesy of DStv from MultiChoice providing a selection of over 15 channels across specific genres.

These include:

- SuperSport Football Plus
- SuperSport Football
- SuperSport Premier League
- SuperSport LaLiga
- SuperSport Action
- SuperSport WWE
- M-Net Movies Stars
- M-Net Movies Legends
- Africa Magic Showcase
- Africa Magic Epic
- Nickelodeon
- Nick Jr.
- Bravo
- Telemundo
- Universal TV
- Studio Universal
- Zee World
- National Geographic
- Al Jazeera

Some channels from DStv under M-Net's local content channels form part of Canal+ Afrique's usual package offerings and/or in the DStv English Plus package in mainland Africa. These include:

- Africa Magic Hausa
- Africa Magic Yoruba
- Maisha Magic Plus
- Maisha Magic Loko
- Maisha Magic Bongo

DStv also has a similar offering of CANAL+ Afrique's French channels under two add-on packages namely DStv French Plus and DStv French Touch.

== See also ==
- Canal+ Group
- Canal+ (French TV provider)
- Canal+ Calédonie
- Canal+ Caraïbes
- DStv
- StarTimes
