= Canal+ Thématiques =

French media company

- Formerly: Ellipse Câble (1988-1996); MultiThématiques (1996-2020)
- Industry: thematic channel publishing
- Founded: August 1, 1988; 37 years ago
- Headquarters: Paris, France
- Key people: Michel Denisot (president and CEO)
- Parent: Canal+ Group
- Website: www.multithematiques.fr

Canal+ Thématiques (formerly Ellipse Câble and later MultiThématiques) is a French company created in 1988, that publishes thematic television channels broadcast by cable and by satellite on the Canal+ satellite provider. The president and CEO of the company is Michel Denisot.

== History ==
MultiThématiques is 100% owned by Canal+ France. 20% by Lagardère Group and 80% by Canal+ Group, which themselves are subsidiary of Vivendi.

On November 29 1995, Canal+ rebranded its cable television provider subsidiary Ellipse Câble as a joint venture between them, American cable operating company Tele-Communications Inc. and Générale d'Images to MultiThématiques when the former announced a joint venture cable television business to develop its own channels internationally.

In November 2000, Eurochannel was acquired by Multithematiques Inc, the short-lived American subsidiary of the French company of the same name, from April, for the sum of $8 million. Its CEO Michel Thoulouze had high hopes following the buying, in an attempt to "reawaken taste" for European content and culture. Under new ownership, Eurochannel expanded to Spanish-speaking countries of Latin America on February 1, 2002, with a soft launch in Mexico a few days earlier on January 21.
