= Blue Entertainment =

Blue Entertainment AG (formerly known as CT Cinetrade AG) is a Swiss media company owned by telecommunication provider Swisscom. The company specialised in film and sport programming rights for television.

Blue Entertainment's businesses include Blue+ (formerly known as Teleclub), which provides a group of premium-tier television channels; Blue Cinema (formerly known as Kitag Cinemas), a chain of film theatres; and Plazavista Entertainment, a home entertainment distributor.

== History ==
Stephan Sager founded CT Cinetrade AG in 1989.

In 2005, Swisscom acquired a minority share in CT Cinetrade. In May 2013, Swisscom increased its share in CT Cinetrade from 49% to 75%.

In November 2017, Swisscom acquired the remaining share of 25% in CT Cinetrade from its founder Stephan Sager.

== Controversies ==
In 2016, the Competition Commission of Switzerland fined Swisscom and what was known as Cinetrade back then an amount of 71.8 million Swiss francs "for allegedly abusing its dominant position in the provision of national football and ice-hockey coverage between 2002 and 2012". In June 2022, the Federal Administrative Court confirmed the fine. Swisscom argued that it was expanding sport offerings beyond what were offered by rivals.
