= Ciné+ OCS =

- Logo of Ciné+ OCS Used since July 3, 2024.
- Country: France
- Broadcast area: France
- Headquarters: Paris, France

Programming
- Languages: French; Original audio track
- Picture format: 576i (SDTV); 1080i (HDTV)

Ownership
- Owner: Canal+ Thématiques (Canal+)

History
- Launched: January 7, 1991; 35 years ago
- Former names: CinéCinémas (1991-2002); CinéCinéma (2002-2011); Ciné+ (2011-2024)

Links
- Website: Ciné+ OCS

Ciné+ OCS is a group of French thematic pay television networks operated by Canal+ Thématiques, and distributed by Canal+ on satellite TV, cable, and IPTV.

Launched in 1991, the channels were originally only dedicated to films, with the exception of Ciné+ Frisson which broadcast two television series from 2012 to 2017. Since 3 July 2024, following a merger with OCS, it is now also dedicated to television series.

The channels broadcast all foreign films and series in their original language on a secondary audio channel with two subtitling tracks in French, one for translation from a foreign language and the other for the hearing impaired.

In Belgium, Ciné+ became Ciné+ OCS later on 1 October 2024, where it only operates the 3 channels OCS, Ciné+ Frisson and Ciné+ Classic as part of the BeTV bouquet.

== TV channels ==
Channel	Type	Launched	Former names
	Films from 6 months after their theatrical release, new French and international premium series	7 January 1991	CinéCinémas (1991-98); CinéCinémas 1 (1998-2002); CinéCinéma (2002-2008); CinéCinéma Premier (2008-11); Ciné+ Premier (2011-24)
	Classic films	7 January 1991	CinéCinéfil (1991-98); CinéClassics (1998-2002); CinéCinéma Classic (2002-11)
	Action, thriller and horror films	27 April 1996	CinéCinémas Seconde (1996-98); CinéCinémas 3 (1998-2002); CinéCinéma Frisson (2002-11)
	Romantic films and rom-com	27 April 1996	CinéCinémas Prime (1996-98); CinéCinémas 2 (1998-2002); CinéCinéma Émotion (2002-11)
	Comedies, family and teen films	14 September 2002	CinéCinéma Succès (2002-04); CinéCinéma Famiz (2004-11); Ciné+ Famiz (2011-24)
	Independent and art house films	14 September 2002	CinéCinéma Auteur (2002-07); CinéCinéma Culte (2007-08); CinéCinéma Club (2008-11); Ciné+ Club (2011-24)

=== Defunct TV channels ===
Channel	Type	Launched	Closed	Former names
CinéCinéma Info	Entertainment industry news and documentaries	May 2000	October 2006	Ciné Info (2000-04)
	Hollywood's blockbusters and awards ceremonies	21 March 2007	30 August 2013	CinéCinéma Star (2007-11)

== Streaming system ==
Logo of Ciné+ à la demande used until 2024.

Ciné+ subscribers were given access to Ciné+ à la demande, a content hub within the platforms (such as MyCanal), to stream their programs.

In Belgium, Ciné+ OCS à la demande is part of BeTV with Be à la demande.

In 2018, Ciné+ started to launch thematic digital channel on Ciné+ à la demande. Some channels where available for a limited time, while other where available for multiples years :

- Ciné+ Horreur (launched in 2018), horror films
- Ciné+ Western (launched in 2018), western films
- Ciné+ British (launched in 2018), British films
- Ciné+ de Quartier (launched in 2018), specialized in European exploitation films and B movies, like giallo, gothic, spaghetti western, sword-and-sandal or swashbuckler films
- Ciné+ Crime (launched in 2018), thriller films
- Ciné+ Comédie (launched in 2018), comedies
- Ciné+ Romance (launched in 2019), romance films
- Ciné+ 80's (launched in 2019), films from the 1980
- Ciné+ Asie (launched in 2019), Asians films
- Ciné+ Animé (launched in 2019), Anime and manga
- Ciné+ Italie (launched in 2019), Italian films
- Ciné+ 90's (launched in 2019), films from the 1990
- Ciné+ De Funès (launched in 2020), Louis de Funès's filmography
- Ciné+ En Musique (launched in 2020), musical and concert films
- Ciné+ 70's (launched in 2020), films from the 1970
- Ciné+ BERGMAN (launched in 2020), Ingmar Bergman's filmography
- Ciné+ Splendid (launched in 2020), Le Splendid's filmography
- Ciné+ Enquêtes (launched in 2021), mystery films
- Ciné+ Bollywood (launched in 2021), Indian films
- Ciné+ À table ! (launched in 2021), films about cooking and foods
- Ciné+ 60's (launched in 2021), films from the 1960
- Ciné+ Histoire (launched in 2021), historical films
- Ciné+ Deneuve (launched in 2021), Catherine Deneuve's filmography

Following the merge with OCS, the content hub was simply renamed Ciné+ OCS, and is still available within MyCanal. It was also made available as a subscription-based channel on others services like Amazon Prime Video. All OCS subscribers were automatically transferred to a Ciné+ OCS subscription. Some of the digital channels were simply transformed into categories on the Ciné+ OCS's hub.

== Series ==
Some series from this list were only made available on streaming.

=== OCS ===
- 61st Street
- 3615 Monique
- A Friend of the Family
- A Spy Among Friends
- Alex Rider
- Angelyne
- Archie
- Aspergirl
- Cheyenne et Lola
- Christian
- Croisement Gaza - Bd Saint-Germain
- Bad Behaviour
- Besoin d'amour
- Blinded
- Devils
- The Dreamer: Becoming Karen Blixen
- Dreaming Whilst Black
- El Inmortal. Gangs of Madrid
- Frérots
- Funny Woman
- The Handmaid's Tale
- Hashtag Boomer
- Homejacking
- HP
- Jeune et Golri
- The Killing Kind
- The Lazarus Project
- Los mil días de Allende
- Love Life
- LT-21
- Lucky Hank
- Mad Men
- Minx
- Missions
- Moah
- The Name of the Rose
- L'Opéra
- Orphan Black: Echoes
- Platonique
- Rictus
- Sentinelles
- Septième Ciel
- Slip
- Tales of the Walking Dead
- Ten Pound Poms
- Toutouyoutou
- Twisted Metal
- The Walking Dead: Dead City
- Weeds
- The Winter King

=== Ciné+ Family ===
- Breeders
- Dragons et Princesses

=== Ciné+ Frisson ===
- American Horror Story (seasons 1-6)
- In the Flesh
