= Canal+ Caraïbes =

Direct broadcasting satellite

Canal+ Caraïbes is a direct broadcasting satellite service serving the French Overseas Departments and French Overseas Collectivities of the Caribbean, as well as French Guiana. The service was launched on 1 August 1998, under the name CanalSatellite Caraibes. It is wholly owned by the Groupe Canal+, and is broadcast on Intelsat 903 at 34.5° West.

== Channels ==
CanalSat Caraïbes had to change satellites to permit the launch of the New High Definition channels.

On 11 October 2008, CanalSat Caraïbes offered a "Freesat" Service, which only requires a viewing card and no subscription; it is very similar to the TNTSAT Service offered in France.

CanalSat Caraïbes launched a high-definition service, 'l'option HD'. It was originally composed of Disney Cinemagic HD, Canal+ HD and National Geographic HD. On 7 June additional channels were launched, they were M6 HD and TF1 HD. CanalSat Caraïbes hoped to launch more channels by the end of 2008.

== Canal+ Haïti ==
Canalsat Haïti was launched in 2011. A local division was created in October 2015.

Canal+ Haïti have different packages. Many channels (like Canal+ and Ciné+ bouquets) and services (Disney+) are unavailable in the territory. Exclusive channels were launched for Haiti like Haïti Sport 1, Haïti Sport 2 and Trace Ayiti.

== See also ==
- Groupe Canal+
- Canal+ (French TV provider)
- Canal+ Afrique
- Canal+ Calédonie
