= Canal+ Sport (French TV channel) =

French sports television channel

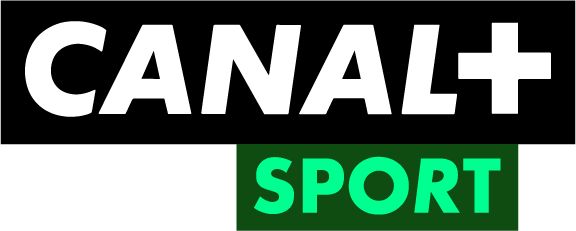
- Country: France
- Broadcast area: France; Switzerland

Programming
- Language: French
- Picture format: 576i (SDTV); 1080i (HDTV)

Ownership
- Owner: Canal+
- Sister channels: Canal+ Foot; Canal+ Live; Canal+ Sport 360

History
- Launched: 31 August 1998; 28 years ago
- Former names: Canal+ Vert (1998–2003)

Links
- Website: canalplus.com/sport

Canal+ Sport is a French TV channel devoted to sports programming and is part of the "Les Chaînes Canal+" themed channels of Canal+.

== History ==
Canal+ Vert launched on 31 August 1998, on satellite and cable, as a channel retransmetting sports coverage.

As part of the creation of the Canal+ Bouquet (later, Les Chaînes Canal+") the channel changed its name on 1 November 2003 to Canal+ Sport.

On 20 April 2005, Canal+ Sport applied to the CSA to obtain a frequency on the French digital terrestrial television service. The application had been selected, so, as a result, the CSA assigned a frequency on the multiplex R3 pay DTT, starting on 21 November 2005.

Starting on 8 June 2010, it has started to broadcast its programming in high-definition television.

In 2024, Canal+ Sport was a candidate for the renewal of its authorization to broadcast on national digital terrestrial television service, set to expire in 2025. It presented its application on 8 July.

On 24 July 2024, Arcom announced that it would not renew C8's DTT frequency. As a result, on 5 December, it was announced that the Canal+ S.A. would remove all its pay channels starting on 6 June 2025.

== Logo history ==
Canal+ Sport second logo from 2005 to 2006.

Canal+ Sport third logo from 2006 to 2009.

Canal+ Sport fourth logo from 2009 to 2013.

Canal+ Sport fifth logo from 2013 to 2023 and Africa version with fifth logo from 2013 to 2024.

== Sports coverage ==
=== Association football ===
- Premier League
- Première Ligue
- UEFA Champions League
- UEFA Europa League
- UEFA Conference League
- UEFA Youth League

=== Motorsport ===
- IndyCar Series
- Grand Prix motorcycle racing (MotoGP)
- Formula One
- World Rally Championship (WRC)

=== Rugby ===
- Top 14
- Pro D2
- Élite 1
- Super Rugby
- The Rugby Championship
- NPC
- Currie Cup
- SANZAAR
- World Rugby Sevens Series
- Supersevens

=== Aquatics ===
- World Aquatics Championships

=== Athletics ===
- Diamond League

=== Basketball ===
- FIBA Basketball World Cup
- EuroBasket
- EuroBasket Women
- National Basketball Association (NBA)

=== Boxing ===
- Premier Boxing Champions

=== Salling ===
- SailGP

=== Ice hockey ===
- National Hockey League (NHL)
- Ice Hockey World Championships (2021–2025)
- Champions Hockey League

=== Golf ===
- Ryder Cup
- The Open Championship
- US Open
- Masters Tournament
- PGA Championship
- PGA Tour
- PGA European Tour
- World Golf Championships

== See also ==
- Canal+
- Canal+ Séries
- Canal+ Kids
- Canal+ Cinéma(s)
- Canal+ Sport 360
