= Alexey Komissarov =

Russian politician

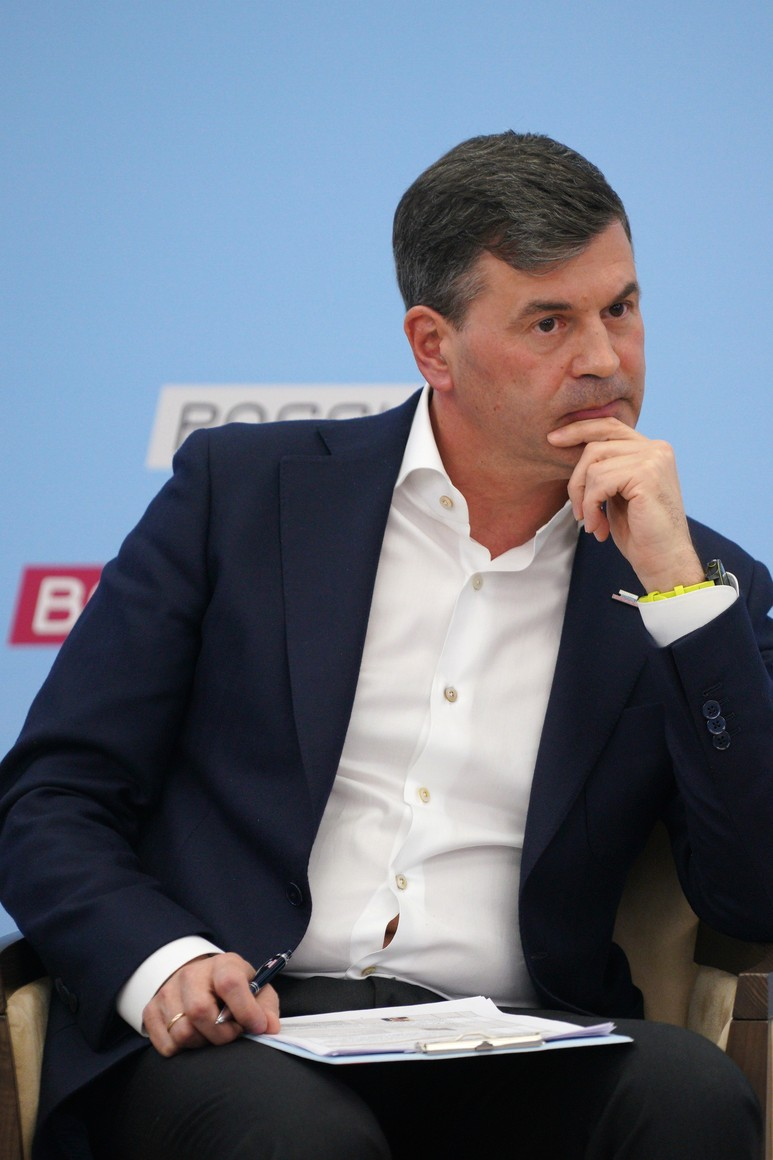
- Komissarov in 2021
- Born: October 20, 1969; Moscow, Russia
- Citizenship: Russian
- Education: Moscow Automobile and Road Construction State Technical University; Kingston University
- Occupation: Director
- Website: komissarov.com/index

Alexey Gennadievich Komissarov (Russian: Алексей Геннадьевич Комиссаров; born October 20, 1969) is a Russian entrepreneur, acting Rector of the Russian Presidential Academy of National Economy and Public Administration (RANEPA), the Director of the Graduate School of Public Administration at the RANEPA, and ex-minister of the Government of Moscow.

== Education ==
In 1994, Alexey Komissarov graduated from the Moscow Automobile and Road Construction State Technical University, earning a maintenance and vehicle repair engineering degree. In 2003 he received an MBA from Kingston University, United Kingdom.

== Biography ==
In 1993 Komissarov founded "Car-repair system", company, specializing in the computerized selection of automotive paints

2010 – opened a paint factory in Tver that uses modern innovative technology production of high-quality automotive and industrial paints,

In May 2010 – founded (together with Vladimir Mau) and headed the InCube (Business incubator) at the Academy of National Economy –. Member of the Independent Directors Association (IDA) and the National Association of Business Angels (SBAR). He was an active angel investor with investments in at least ten start-ups.

On November 25, 2010, Komissarov won Entrepreneur of the Year 2010" in the Industrial production category at "Ernst & Young" Russian stage international competition.

On February 7, 2011, became head of the Department of "Small and Medium Business support and development" in the Moscow city Government..

2011, June – The Department for Small and Medium Business Support and Development merged with the Department of Science and Industrial Policy. Alexey Komissarov was appointed as the Head of the Joint Department of Science, Industrial Policy and Entrepreneurship of Moscow City, Russia.

2012 – drafted the law for "Scientific, technical and innovative activity in Moscow city." Moscow City Duma adopted it as a Moscow city law on June 6, 2012. This law established support by the State for science, technology and innovation. This law stands for the creation of technoparks and techno polis systems.

On September 17, 2013 was appointed as Minister in the Government of Moscow,

In March 2015 – appointed as the head the Department of Entrepreneurial Leadership at Moscow "Skolkovo" Management School.

On March 18, 2015 – Director of the Industrial Development Fund. Fund was established after reorganization of the Russian Foundation for Technological Development. There were more than 800 applications submitted for this competition.

On June 3, 2015 – became an independent director in the board of directors at JSC "GLONASS".

April 6, 2017 – appointed Vice-Rector of the Russian Presidential Academy of National Economy and Public Administration (RANEPA) and the Graduate School of Public Administration Director at the RANEPA.

January 23, 2023 – Acting Rector of the Russian Presidential Academy of National Economy and Public Administration (RANEPA) and the Director of the Graduate School of Public Administration at the RANEPA.

== Public, expert activity ==
Actively participate in the work of public associations and various expert groups under state agencies

- Analysis, research and organization of expert discussions of the Fourth Industrial Revolution (from 2015)
- member of The Board of Trustees of the All-Russian Public Organization of Small and Medium-Sized Enterprises "OPORA RUSSIA" (since 2016 г.). This organization is one of the founders of the "Business Success" national award, and the best municipal support of entrepreneurship competition
- Supervisory Board of "Agency for Technology Development" (since 2016)
- Launch of the educational project ipi 4.0 (since 2017)

== Hobbies ==
He participated in Russian and European motorcycle championships. Teamed up with Alexander Kuznetsov, Alexey Komissarov took first place in the Endurance Cup of Russia in 2008. In March 2015, he took part in one of the 20 most extreme races of the world – Baikal Ice Marathon (42 km on the ice of lake Baikal in Siberia from one bank to another) and finished second in his age category. Now he is doing Triathlon, in 2016 finished two IronMan races (in South Africa and Spain)

== Family ==
He is married and has three daughters.
