= Francis Serrano =

Catholic missionary and saint (1695–1748)

Francisco Serrano (Chinese: 德方济; December 4, 1695 – October 28, 1748) was a Spanish Catholic missionary in China during the 18th century. He died as a martyr in 1748 and was later canonized by the church as a saint.

== Life ==
He was born on December 4, 1695, in Huéneja in southern Spain. His father was Juan Serrano Ximénez and his mother was María de Frías Treviño. He joined the Dominican Order in Spain and made his profession of vows at the Monastery of Santa Cruz la Real in 1714.

Serrano and several other Dominicans were sent as missionaries to Asia in 1725. They embarked from Cádiz and sailed westwards to Spanish Mexico. They crossed Mexico on foot and arrived at the port of Acapulco where they waited for more than a year for a ship that would cross the Pacific Ocean and bring them to the Spanish Philippines. They sailed on the ship Nuestra Señora de los Dolores and arrived in Manila in 1727.

He with other Dominicans were soon afterwards sent to do mission work in China. He worked illegally as a missionary priest in Fujian, and clandestinely travelled to Christian communities to minister to them.

He was ordained bishop in 1745 and made the coadjutor vicar apostolic of Fujian under the bishop Peter Sanz. He was arrested in 1746 and tortured for two years. Sanz himself was martyred in 1747 and Serrano automatically replaced him as bishop while he remained in prison.

He was executed by suffocation on the night of October 28, 1748, along with several others who were martyred with him.

== Canonization ==
Serrano was beatified by Pope Leo XIII in 1893 and later was named a saint by Pope John Paul II in 2000.
