= Russian Presidential Academy of National Economy and Public Administration =

Higher professional education institution in Moscow, Russia

The Russian Presidential Academy of National Economy and Public Administration
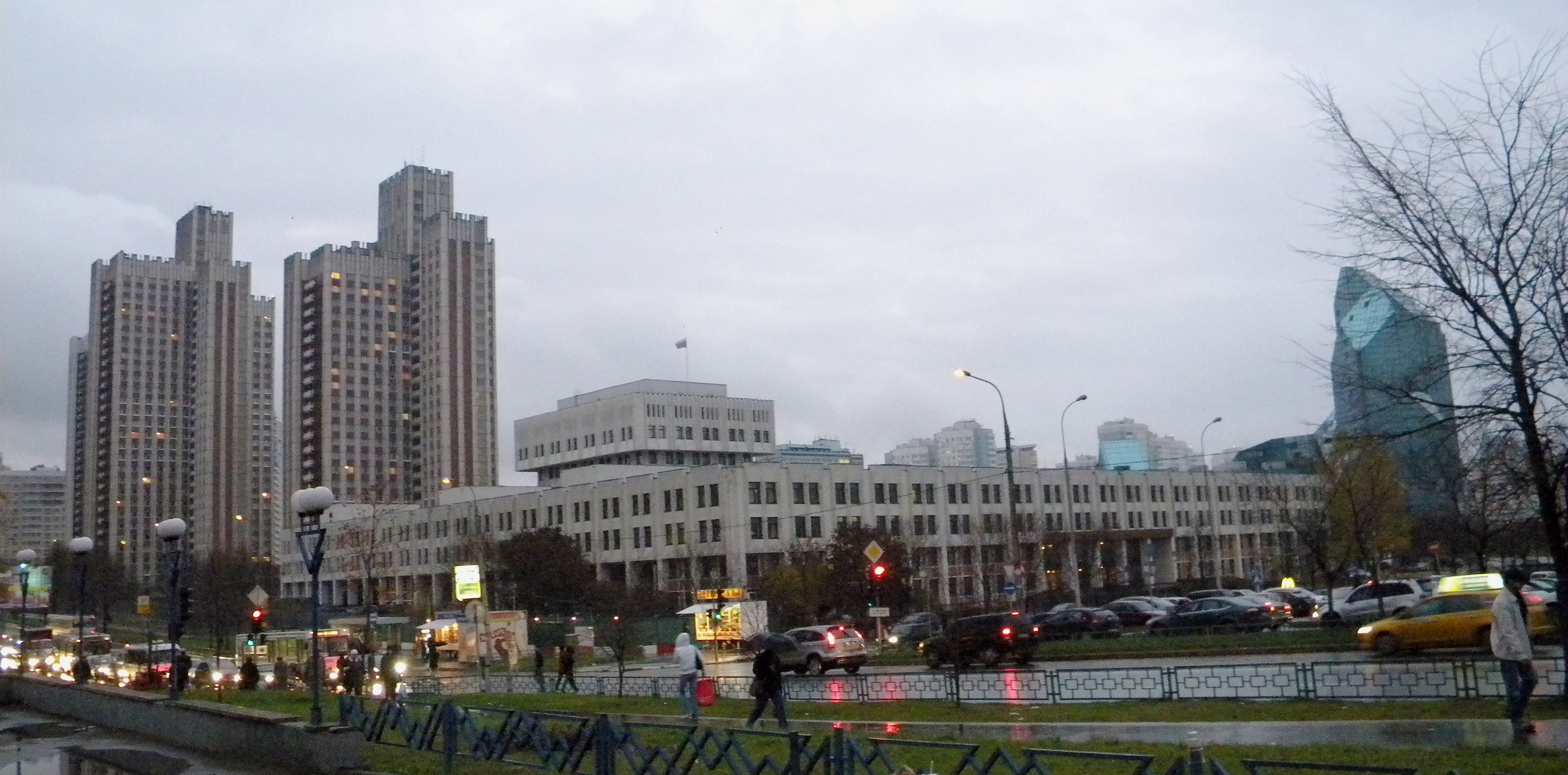
- Former names: Academy of National Economy, Russian Academy of Public Administration
- Type: Public
- Established: 1977 (reorganized in 2010)
- Rector: Alexey Komissarov
- Students: 180,000
- Location: Moscow, Russia; 55°40′02″N 37°28′46″E
- Campus: Urban
- Colors: Red
- Nickname: RANEPA
- Website: RANEPA.ru
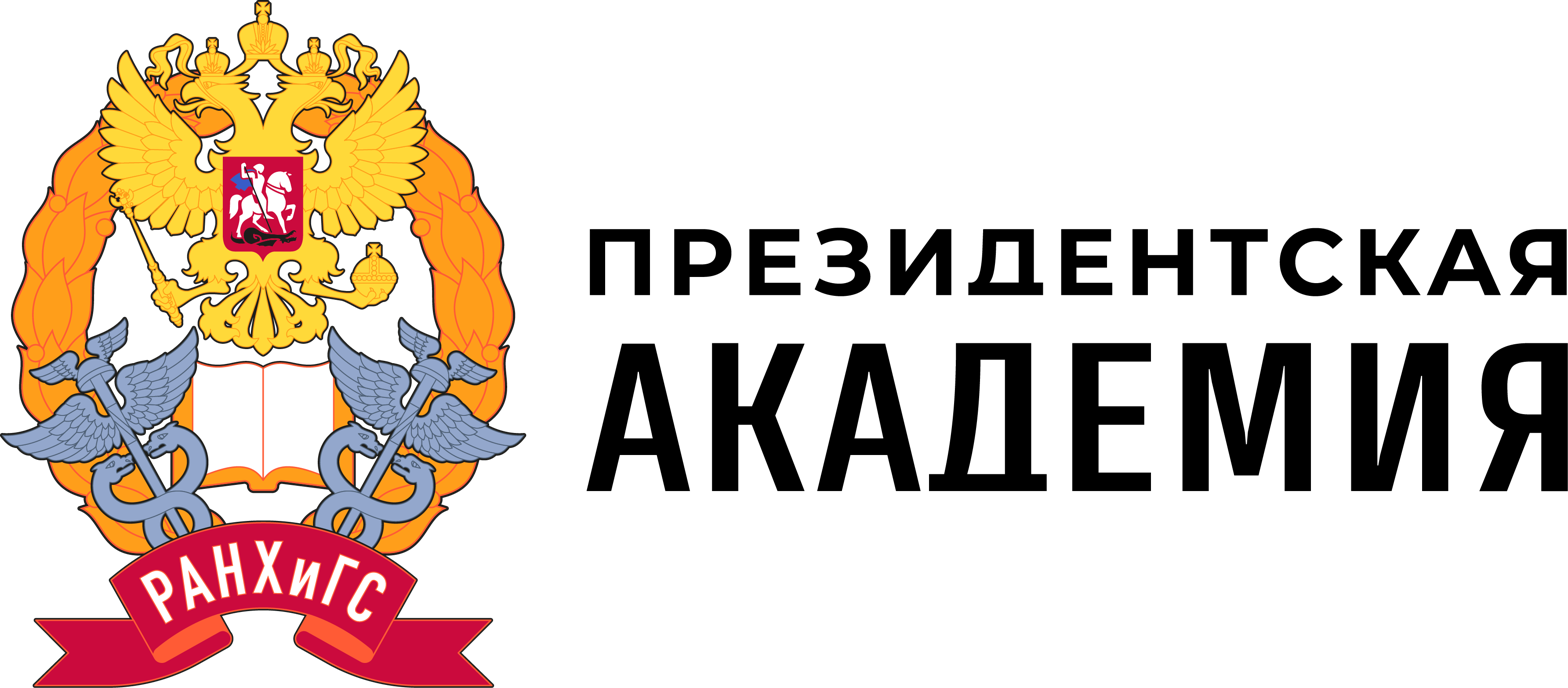

University rankings

Regional – Overall
- QS Emerging Europe and Central Asia: 148 (2022)

The Russian Presidential Academy of National Economy and Public Administration (RANEPA) is a federal state-funded institution of higher education located in Moscow, Russia.

With the merger of Academy of National Economy (ANE), Russian Academy of Public Administration (RAPA), 12 other regional civil service academies in 2010, the newly formed Russian Presidential Academy became one of the larger socioeconomic and humanities universities in Russia and Europe.

The academy consists of 22 faculties, had 55 branches, and includes the Graduate School of Corporate Management (President – acad. Abel Aganbegyan) and delivers professional degree programs including 113 bachelor's programs, 11 specialist programs, nearly 150 master's programs and 7 vocational/associate degree programs. It is a Consultative body under the Government of Russian Federation.

== History ==
The Academy of National Economy under the Government of the Russian Federation was established in 1977. It provided business and educational programs and trained civil servants, entrepreneurs, financiers, and lawyers. By 2010 it produced over 100,000 graduates, among them presidents of post-soviet countries, prime ministers and businessmen (including Sergey Kiriyenko and Alexey Gordeyev).

In 1995 with its Resolution, the Russian Government granted the academy with the official status of the leading educational, methodological and research center in the system of training and qualification upgrading of the federal and regional civil servants, as well as the leading educational institution that carries out training of specialists in the area of the higher professional, postgraduate and complementary training. In 2010 by the decree of the Russian president, the Russian Academy of Public Administration as well as some regional universities joined ANE to form the Russian Presidential Academy of National Economy and Public Administration. Academy holds membership with a number of international education associations. Since 2024 the Time of Heroes program is implemented on the basis of the Senezh management workshop of the Higher School of Public Administration of academy.

== People affiliated with the academy ==
- Abel Aganbegyan
- German Gref
- Santiago Iñiguez de Onzoño
- Paul Judge
- Manfred F.R. Kets de Vries
- Andrey Korotkov
- Laurence Kotlikoff
- Vladimir Lisin
- Yekaterina Shulman
- Dmitry Shumkov
- Aleksei Shaposhnikov
- Olga Vasilieva
- Veniamin Yakovlev
- Alina Zagitova
- Tatyana Zaslavskaya

=== Notable alumni ===
- Dmitry Smirnov
- Viktoria Abramchenko
- Anton Kobyakov
- Nelly Petkova

== See also ==
- List of Business Schools in Europe
