= Santiago Iñiguez de Onzoño =

Spanish academic (born 1962)

Prof. Santiago Iñiguez de Onzoño
- Born: 17 May 1962 (age 64); Madrid, Spain
- Occupations: President, IE University
- Board member of: Headspring, QS Merit, EFMD

Academic background
- Education: Complutense University of Madrid; Oxford University; IE Business School
- Website: https://www.linkedin.com/in/siniguez/?locale=es_ES

Santiago Iñiguez de Onzoño (born May 17, 1962, Madrid, Spain) is the Executive President of IE University in Madrid, Spain. He studied at Complutense University of Madrid and Oxford University, UK. Iñiguez de Onzoño is a Doctor of Law and holds an MBA from IE Business School.

Iñiguez has worked as a management consultant and has played an active role in the field of quality control and development of management education in Europe.

He was portrayed by the Financial Times as "one of the most significant figures in promoting European business schools internationally". Iñiguez is also President of the IE Fund in the US.

Iñiguez was the first recipient (2019) of the Founders Award by Thinkers 50, the prestigious global ranking of thoughtful leaders in Management. He was the first European appointed as "Dean of the Year" by Poets & Quants (2017). He has also been member on the board of AMBA (Association of MBA), founding member of EQUIS (European Quality Improvement System) and the founder of the Reinventing Higher Education conference.

He is also one of the founders and member of the board of Headspring, a joint venture of IE Business School and the Financial Times.

He is the author of "The Learning Curve: How Business Schools Are Reinventing Education" (2011), "Cosmopolitan Managers: Executive Education That Works" (2016), "Business Despite Borders: Companies in the Age of Populist Anti-Globalization" (2018), "In An Ideal Business: How The Ideas of 10 female Philosophers Bring Value Into The Workplace" (2019) and "Philosophy Inc.: Applying Wisdom to everyday management" (2023), all published by Springer Palgrave Macmillan

Iñiguez is a regular speaker at international conferences and frequently contributes in different journals and media on higher education and executive developments. Iñiguez is also Professor of Strategic Management at IE Business School.
