= Dmitry Smirnov (entrepreneur) =

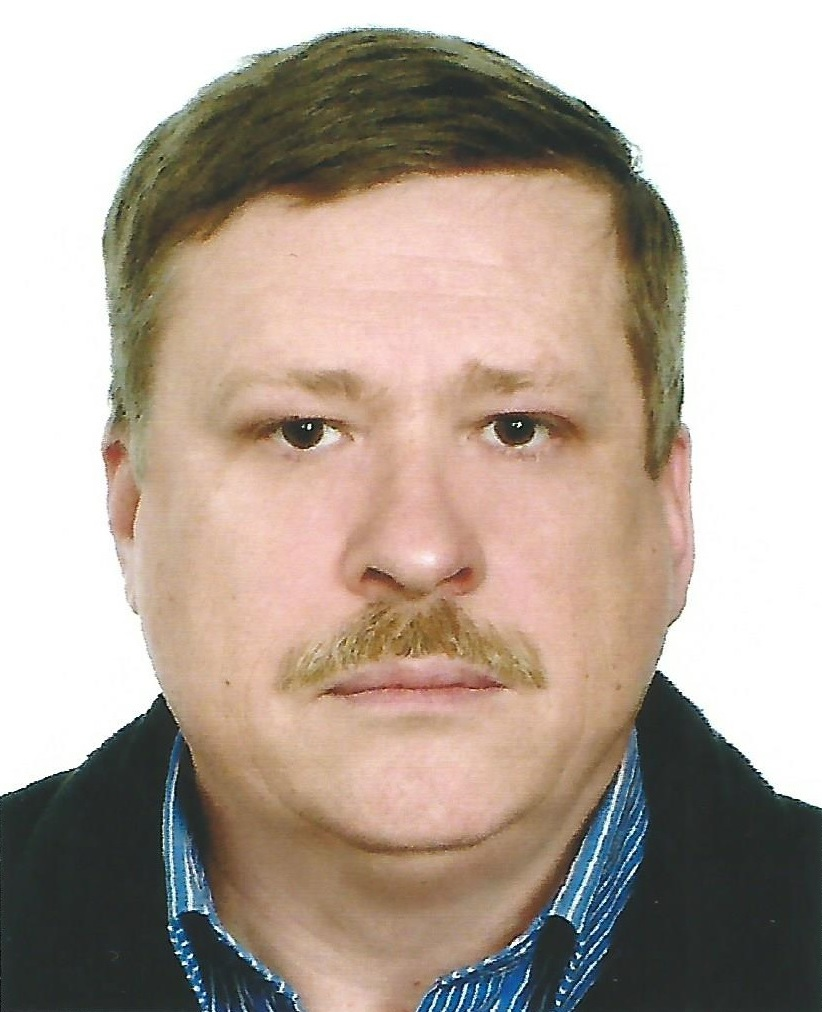
- Born: 12 August 1958 (age 67); Kharkiv, USSR
- Education: Russian Presidential Academy of National Economy and Public Administration
- Alma mater: Kharkiv Polytechnic Institute
- Occupations: Businessman, entrepreneur
- Awards: “200 years of the MIA of Russia” medal

Dmitry Genrikhovich Smirnov (Russian: Дмитрий Генрихович Смирнов; born August 12, 1958, in Kharkov, USSR) is a Russian politician, executive, and entrepreneur. He served as a deputy of the Supreme Soviet of the Soviet Union (1989—1991).

== Biography ==
Born on August 12, 1958, in Kharkov.

Graduated with honors from the Kharkov V. I. Lenin Polytechnical Institute in 1985, and graduated with honors from the Academy of National Economy under the Council of Ministers of the USSR in 1991. Dmitry Smirnov participated in the International Visitor Leadership Program (IVLP) in 1990 by invitation of the United States Ambassador to the Soviet Union Jack Foust Matlock Jr.

- before 1989, worked as a design engineer at the “Kharkov Electromechanical Plant” SDO SPA.
- 1989—1991 Deputy of the Supreme Soviet of the USSR from the Kharkovskiy-Moskovskiy territorial electoral constituency No. 521 of Kharkov. Member of the Planning, Budget and Finance Committee of the Soviet Union. Chairman of the subcommittee for control over the performance of the Union budget. Chairman of the committee for provision for the deputative activities.
- 1993—1994 Chief Specialist of the Department for Relations with the Authorities, Public and Mass Media of the Ministry of Fuel and Energy of the Russian Federation.
- 1994—1997 Director and Vice President of the “United Nord“ Management Company” CJSC.
- 1998—2000 Marketing Director and Vice President of the “Directorate of the Intergovernmental Innovative Ore Program” OJSC.
- 2000—2010 Director General of the “Ekologiya” TV Company Non-Commercial Partnership.
- 2006— presently working: entrepreneur. Scope of activities: consulting in the domain of commercial activities and management, international turnover of goods.

== Charity ==
- Active contribution to the reconstruction of the St. Serafim of Sarov church in Sosenskiy
- Contribution to the construction of the Russian Orthodox Church's St. Nikolaos the Wonderworker church in Limassol (Cyprus)
- Assistance to the "VYMPEL" Charity Fund (Russian: Благотворительный фонд «ВЫМПЕЛ») for support of the veterans of the state security agencies’ special operations teams

== Awards ==
- “200 years of the MIA of Russia” medal

== Links ==
- Smirnov Dmitry Genrikhovich
- IE Smirnov Dmitry Genrikhovich
- “United Nord“ Management Company” CJSC
- “Directorate of the Intergovernmental Innovative Ore Program” OJSC
- St. Serafim of Sarov church in Sosenkiy
- St. Nikolaos the Wonderworker church in Limassol (Cyprus)
- “VYMPEL” Charity Fund
