= IE Business School =

Spanish higher education institution

- Other names: Instituto de Empresa, S. L.
- Type: Private business school
- Established: 1973
- Accreditation: AACSB, EQUIS, AMBA, Triple accreditation
- Academic affiliations: IE University
- President: Diego del Alcázar
- Dean: Lee Newman
- Students: 6,000
- Location: Madrid · Segovia · New York City
- Campus: Urban
- Colors
- Mascots: CammIE, the Chameleon
- Website: www.ie.edu/business

IE Business School is an undergraduate and graduate business school, located in Madrid, Spain. It was founded in 1973 under the name Instituto de Empresa (lit. Institute of Business) and is part of IE University since 2007. IE Business School is known for its master's program in management, which has been well ranked by numerous publications. It maintains a global network of approximately 220 partner universities, while also offering dual-degree programs. The institution runs BBA, MBA, Executive MBA, master's degree programs in finance and management, executive education programs, PhD, and DBA programs.

== History ==
IE Business School was established in 1973 in Madrid, Spain and was founded by entrepreneurs with a focus on entrepreneurship in business education. The school has especially emphasized on diversity.

In 2001, it launched its first blended program and in 2002 its e-learning unit. Over the years, the school has earned the "triple crown accreditation" in 2002, a distinction held by only 1% of business schools worldwide.

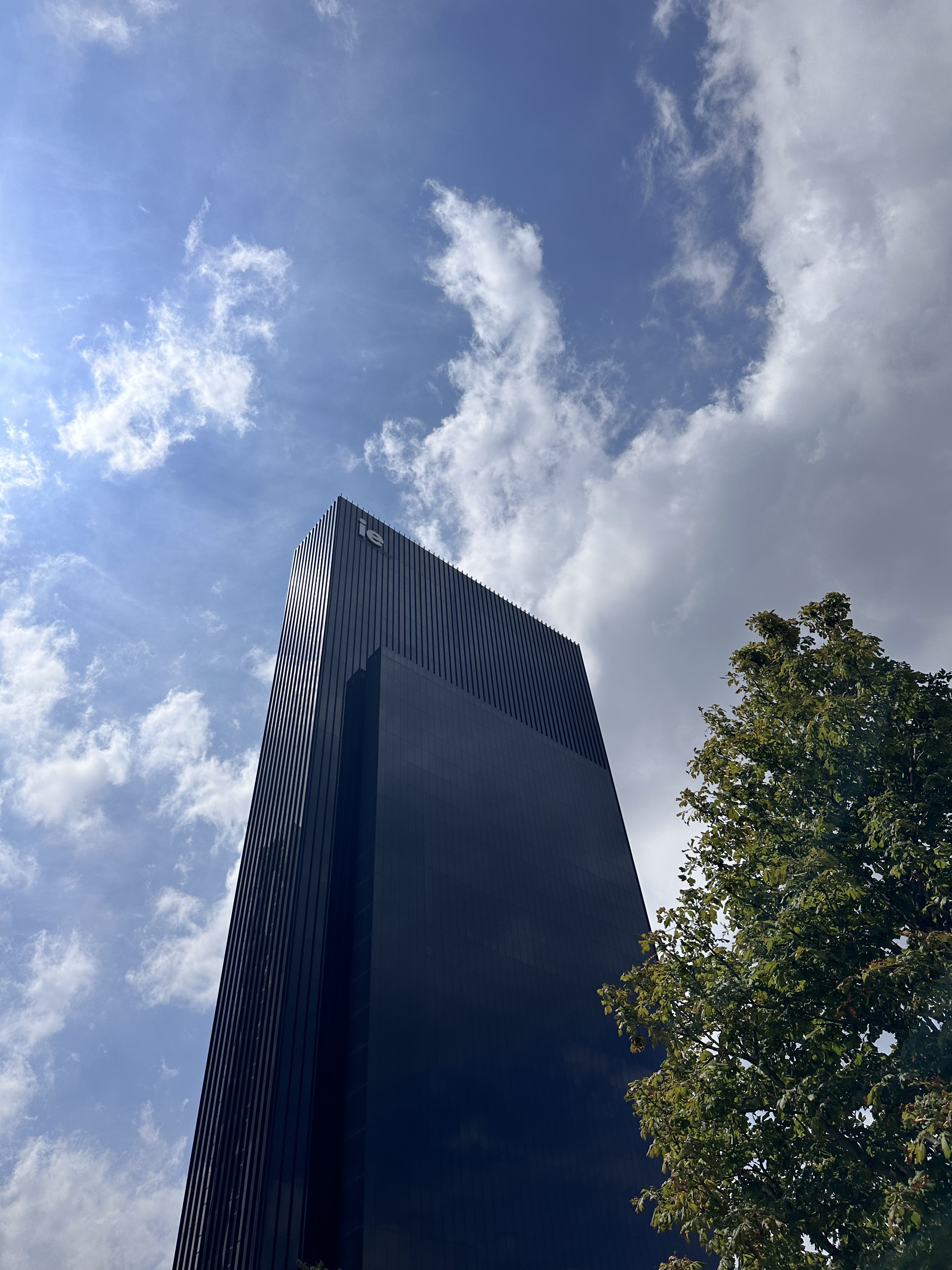
IE Tower

In 2010, IE opened Area 31, a dedicated co-working space for its entrepreneurship center and incubator for numerous startups. In 2011, the school has launched its IE-Brown Executive MBA together with Brown University, an Ivy League university. The program has been ranked highly on a regular basis.

In response to the COVID-19 pandemic in 2020, IE introduced its "Liquid Learning" model, combining online learning sessions with onsite residentials. In 2021, the business school opened a new campus called IE Tower in Madrid's financial district.

The same year, former American McKinsey consultant, Lee Newman was appointed as dean of the business school replacing Martin Böhm who moved on to EBS University as a new in September 2021.

== Degrees ==
IE Business School offers a variety of bachelor, master and doctorate degrees. It was one of the first institutions in Spain and Europe to offer the MBA degree in 1974.

== Campus ==
=== Madrid Campus ===
IE Business School has multiple campuses globally, with one of its main campuses centrally situated in Madrid’s district of Salamanca. The campus currently occupies a total area of 28,000 m^{2} (33,000 sq yd), it is distributed among 17 buildings along the Calle Maria de Molina street, and is primarily used for undergraduate and postgraduate studies.

=== Segovia Campus ===
Additionally, IE Business School maintains a campus in Segovia, housed in the historic Convent of Santa Cruz la Real, an ancient monastery from the 12th century and characterized as a UNESCO World Heritage, which provides a traditional setting for undergraduate programs as well. The convent, founded in 1218 and closely linked to the Dominican Order, is characterized by its Romanesque and Gothic architecture. Legends connect its origins to the penance of Saint Dominic of Guzmán in a nearby cave, while 15th‑century patronage by King Ferdinand and Queen Isabella led to extensive reconstruction under architect Juan Guas and sculptor Sebastián de Almonacid. This renovation produced a monumental church with an off-center portal rich in religious and political symbolism. After the dissolution of the Dominican community in 1836, the building was repurposed as a hospice and nursing home before being restored for educational use.

=== IENYC Campus ===
In 2024, IE has opened an institution with a new campus in New York City called IENYC offering US-accredited master programs focusing on business and sustainability.

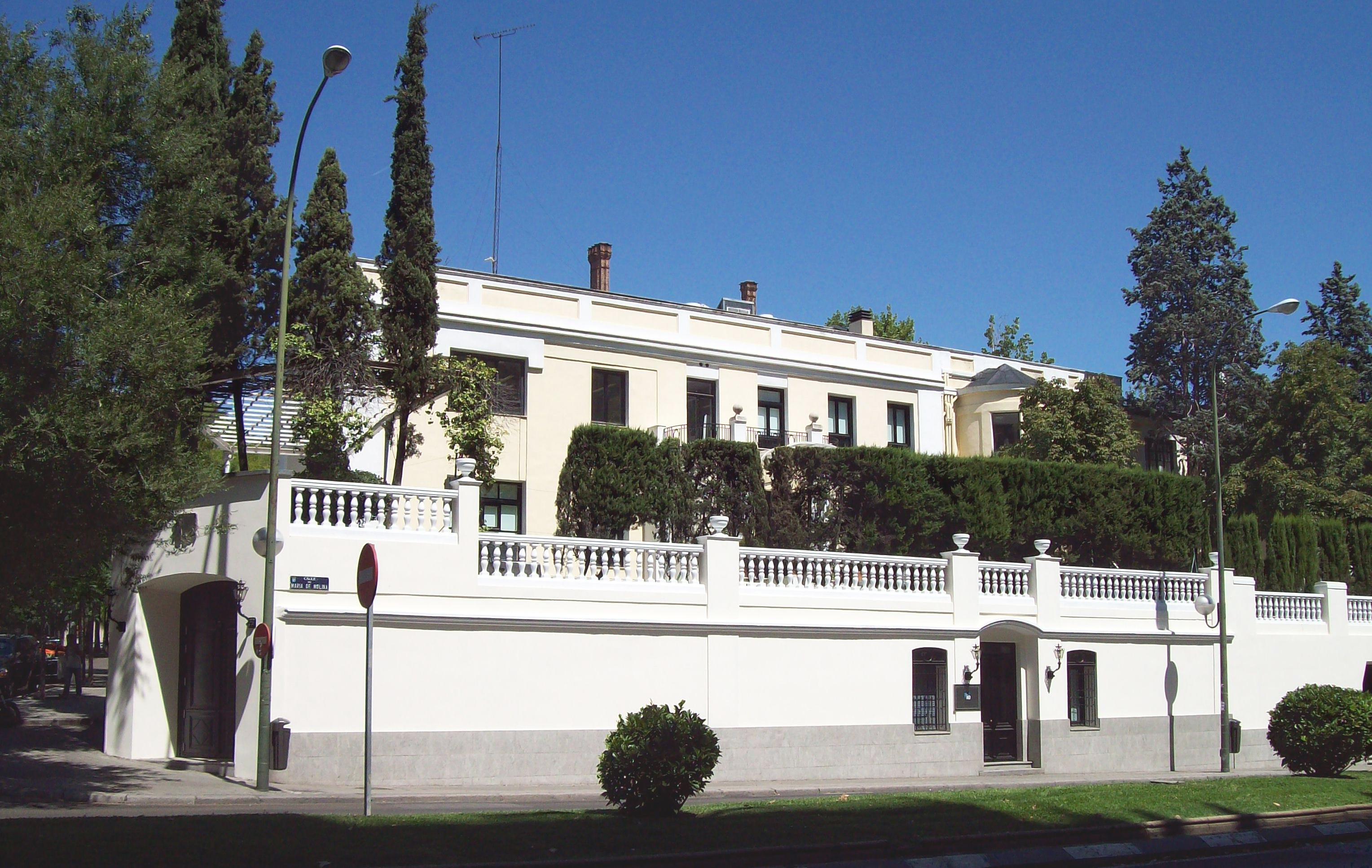
Madrid Calle Maria de Molina 11 Campus

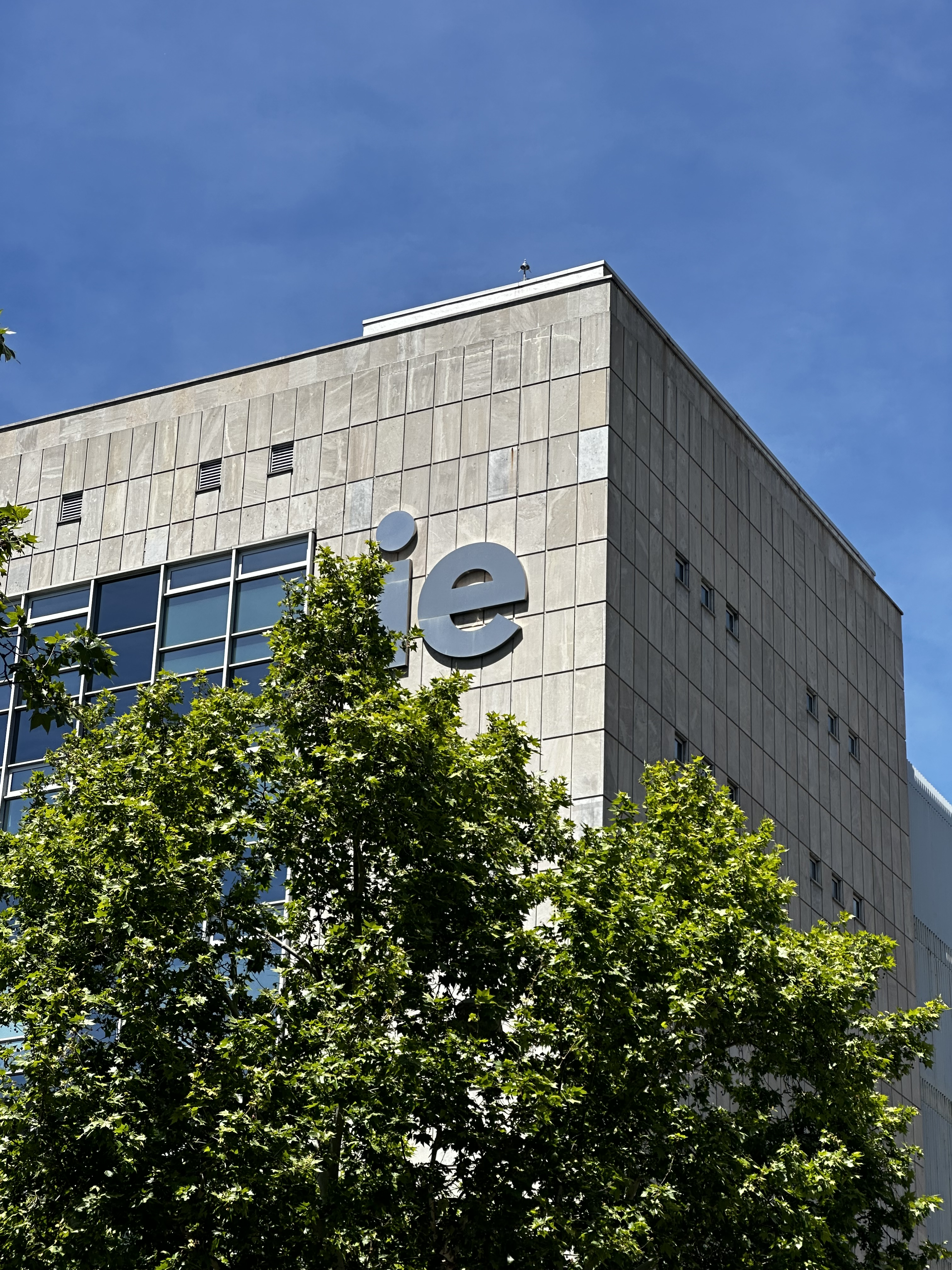
Madrid Calle Maria de Molina 31 Campus

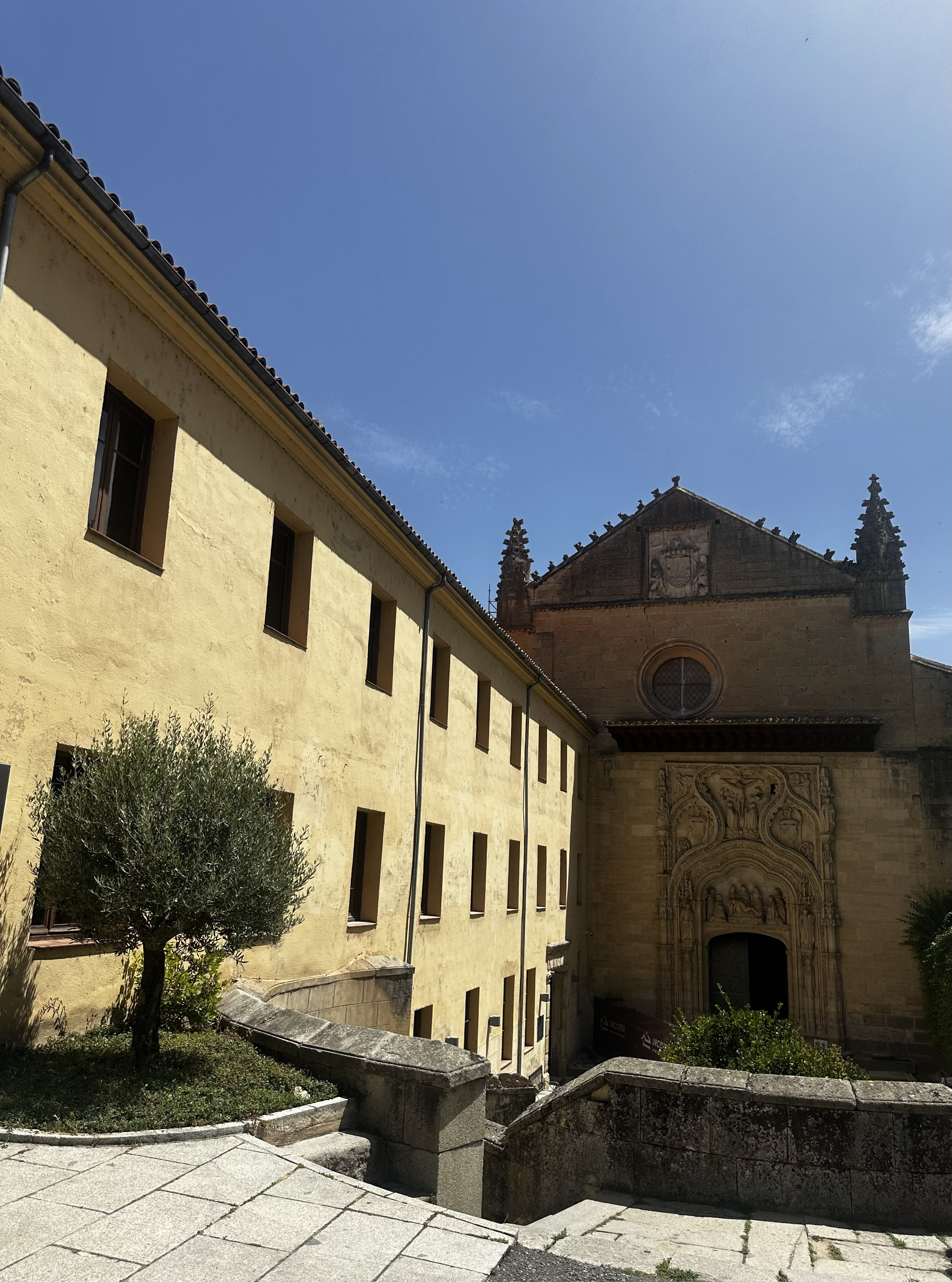
Segovia Campus

== Student Life ==
=== Student Organizations ===
With over 6,000 students and 130 nationalities represented in the student body, there are numerous student-led clubs with different themes such as a Model United Nations club, the Private Equity and Venture Capital club, the 180 Degrees Consulting club, the TEDx club as well as several country specific societies.

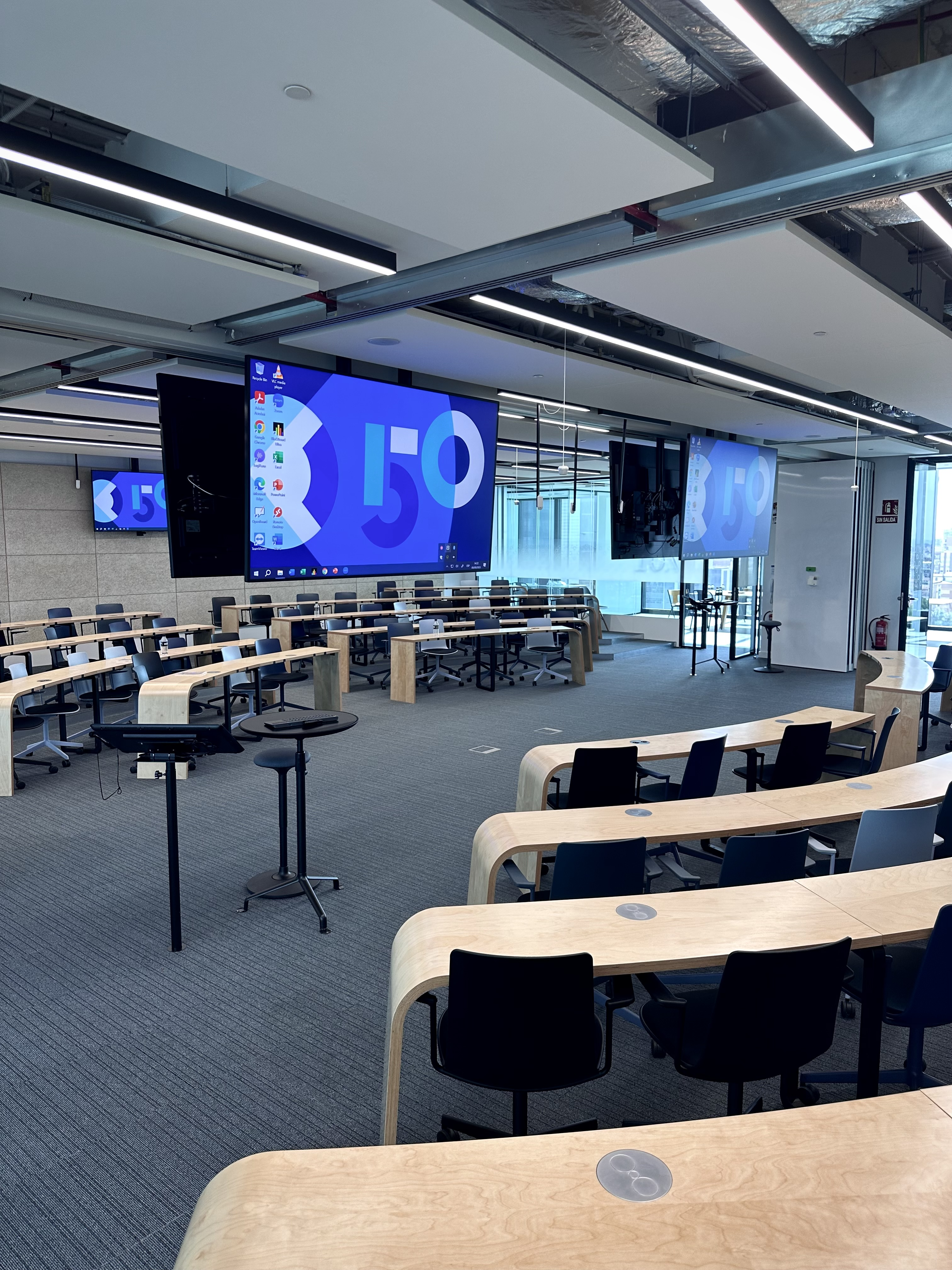
Typical Class Room at IE Tower

=== Student publications ===
The university hosts student-run publications:

- The Stork: a campus magazine run by the student society.
- IE International Policy Review: a student-led academic journal founded in 2018 with occasional collaborations with the academic journals of Sciences Po and Princeton University.

=== Campus Life ===
Campus Life is a dedicated department at IE Business School and its overall university which organizes several recurring events per year.

Furthermore, the department facilitates the founding of student clubs. In 2025, the business school has more than 170 student clubs across undergraduate, graduate and doctorate studies.

=== Traditions ===
There are several annual traditions at IE business school and the overall IE University.

IE Day

Each year the overall IE University hosts the IE Day, a festival day that unites students, faculty, staff, and alumni in a display of its school spirit. Since its inception in the late 2010s, it includes live performances, scavenger hunts, dance acts, exhibitions and community events.

Hay Festival Segovia

Hay Festival Segovia, is an offshoot of the original Hay Festival in Wales, which began in 2006. Hosted partly on IE University’s historic Segovia campus, the festival has grown into one of Spain’s main cultural events, attracting authors, artists, and thinkers for a series of talks, workshops, and performances that promote dialogue and cultural exchange.

Global Village

Global Village is an annual, student-organized event that celebrates the cultural diversity of IE University. Held each spring, it transforms campus spaces into an international fair where country-specific booths, performances, and culinary displays highlight the heritage of its global community.

South Summit

South Summit is an annual conference held in Madrid since 2012 that focuses on entrepreneurship. Founded by María Benjumea in collaboration with IE Business School during a period of economic uncertainty, the event was initially designed to revitalize Spain’s startup ecosystem. Over time, it has expanded its international scope with satellite editions in Latin America and Asia, attracting early-stage startups, investors, and corporate representatives. The conference includes pitch competitions, panel discussions, and networking sessions, and is regarded as a forum for discussing trends in venture capital, public policy, and collaborative innovation across Europe. IE contributes to South Summit by integrating academic research and mentorship programs, with faculty and students actively participating to bridge theoretical insights with practical experience.

== International rankings ==
IE Business School is considered the 10th best business school in Europe in 2024 according to the Financial Times.

	2016	2017	2018	2019	2020	2021	2022	2023	2024
FT - Global EMBA	10	13	12	16	12	12	13	6	19
FT - Global Online MBA	1	1	2	2	2	2	3	1	1
FT - Master in Finance	3	8	11		12	8	8	7	12
QS - International MBA			8				7	8	9
FT - Master in Management	7	3	10	16	25	13	17	16	21
QS - Master in Business Analytics			10	17	16			7	8

== Notable people ==
=== Notable faculty ===
- Enrico Letta – Former Prime Minister of Italy
- Paolo Gentiloni – Former Prime Minister of Italy
- Iván Duque – Former President of Colombia
- Felipe Calderón – Former President of Mexico

=== Notable alumni ===
- Catharina-Amalia, Princess of Orange - Princess of the Netherlands
- Maya Gnyp - Oscar and Emmy nominated film producer
- Isabel Yordi Aguirre - former CEO of Tabacalera
- Meinrad Spenger - Co-Founder of MásMóvil
- Bernard Niesner - Co-Founder of Busuu
