= IE University =

Private university in Madrid, Spain

- IE Universidad; Universidad Instituto de Empresa
- Motto: Unus Mundus Mentes Diversae (Latin)
- Motto in English: "One World, Diverse Minds"
- Type: Private university
- Established: 1973
- Affiliations: Association of Professional Schools of International Affairs
- President: Santiago Iñiguez de Onzoño
- Rector: Salvador Carmona
- Dean: Lee Newman, IE Business School
- Administrative staff: 500+ professors
- Students: 10,000+
- Location: Madrid and Segovia, Castile and León, Spain; 40.4775978°N 3.6891026°W
- Campus: Urban and Suburban
Colours
Navy & IE Blue
- Website: https://www.ie.edu

IE University, known in Spanish as IE Universidad or Universidad Instituto de Empresa (lit. University Institute of Business), is a private university with campuses in Madrid and Segovia, Castile and León, Spain, that formed as an outgrowth of IE Business School originally founded as the Instituto de Empresa (IE). The programs are compliant with the terms of the European Higher Education Area (Bologna Process).

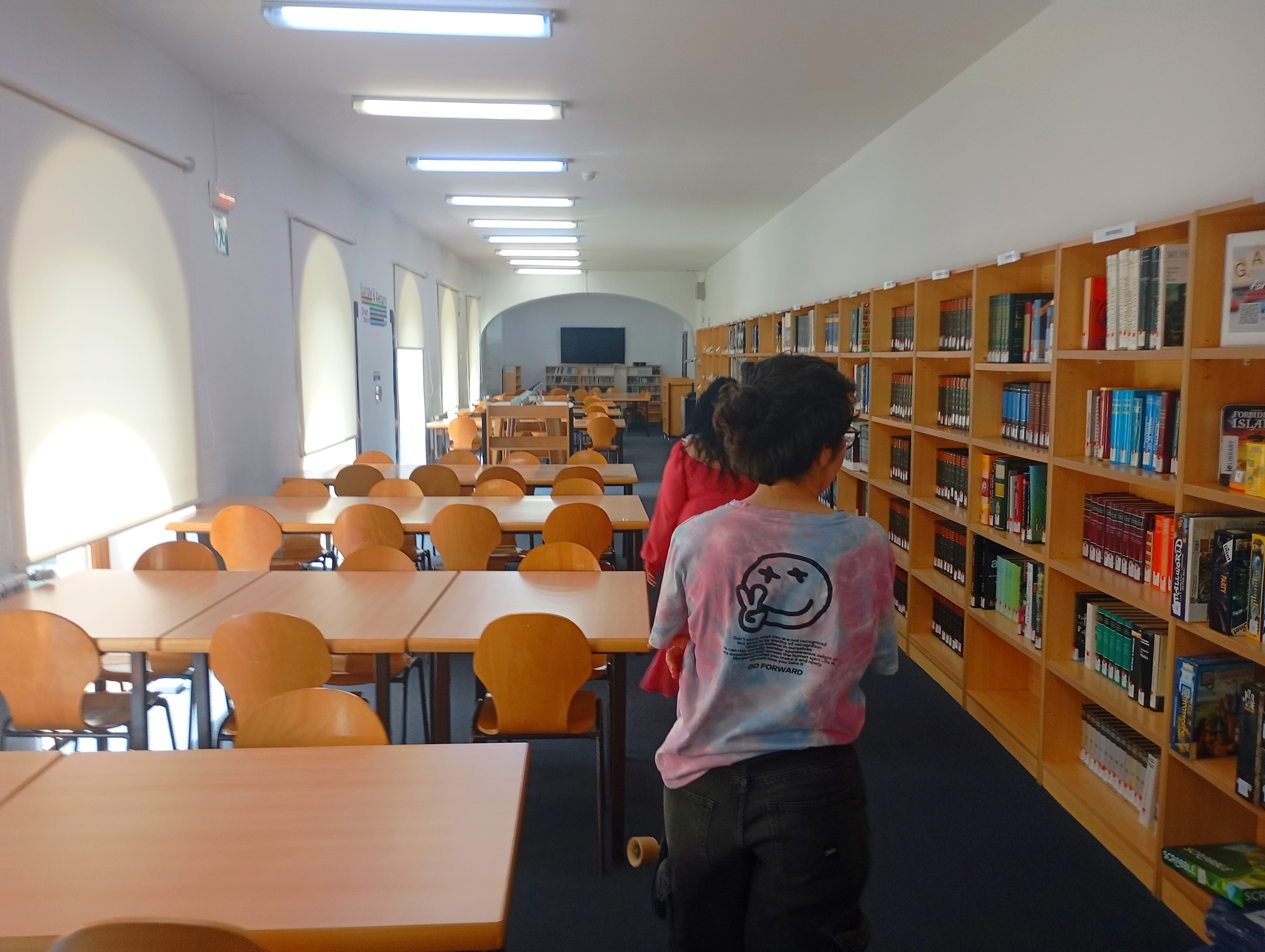
Segovia campus library

It is a member of The European University of Social Sciences, or CIVICA.

== History ==
IE (Instituto de Empresa) was founded in Madrid, Spain as a graduate professional school in business and law in 1973 with the goal of fostering an entrepreneurial environment through its various programs. Over the years, it established multiple international partnerships with other universities, such as a dual MBA with Brown University and an Asian-focused program run with Singapore Management University.

IE University opened to undergraduates in 2006 and was established in Santa Cruz el Real Convent after Instituto de Empresa Ltd. acquired Universidad S.E.K. (S.E.K. are the initials of San Estanislao de Kostka, Saint Stanislaus Kostka in English language), which was founded and was owned by the Educational Institution SEK. In 2004, the regulator, the Junta de Castilla y León approved the bylaws of the Universidad S.E.K. On November 30, 2006, the Junta de Castilla y León authorised the partial sale of ownership of Universidad S.E.K. to Instituto de Empresa, S. L. (owner of the IE Business School).

In 2007 the Junta approved the modification of the bylaws of the Universidad S.E.K. In 2008 the name was changed from Universidad S.E.K. to IE Universidad in Spanish language, and the commercial name IE University in English language (IE being the initials of Instituto de Empresa). IE University began operations in September 2009 and its first class graduated in 2013.

== Schools ==
IE University operates as the umbrella organization for six distinct schools.

- IE Business School, the largest school by volume of students, is also the oldest of the six. It was founded in 1973.
- IE Law School serves as the school for the undergraduate and graduate programs in law, as well as the center for the PPLE (Politics, Philosophy, Law, and Economics) Degree.
- IE School of Politics, Economics and Global Affairs (known by students as SPEGA), the second largest school by volume of students, is the center for the undergraduate and graduate programs in International Relations, Political Science, and Economics.
- IE School of Architecture and Design serves as the school for the programs in Architecture, Design, and Fashion Design. Since 2025, it has its own campus at the Palacio de Mansilla, in Segovia.
- IE School of Science and Technology, launched in 2022, is the center for the programs in computer science and mathematics.
- IE School of Humanities, launched in 2023.

IE University also runs IE New York College in New York City. It was formerly known as Glasgow Caledonian New York College and operated by Glasgow Caledonian University from 2013 to 2023.

== Criticism and social tension ==
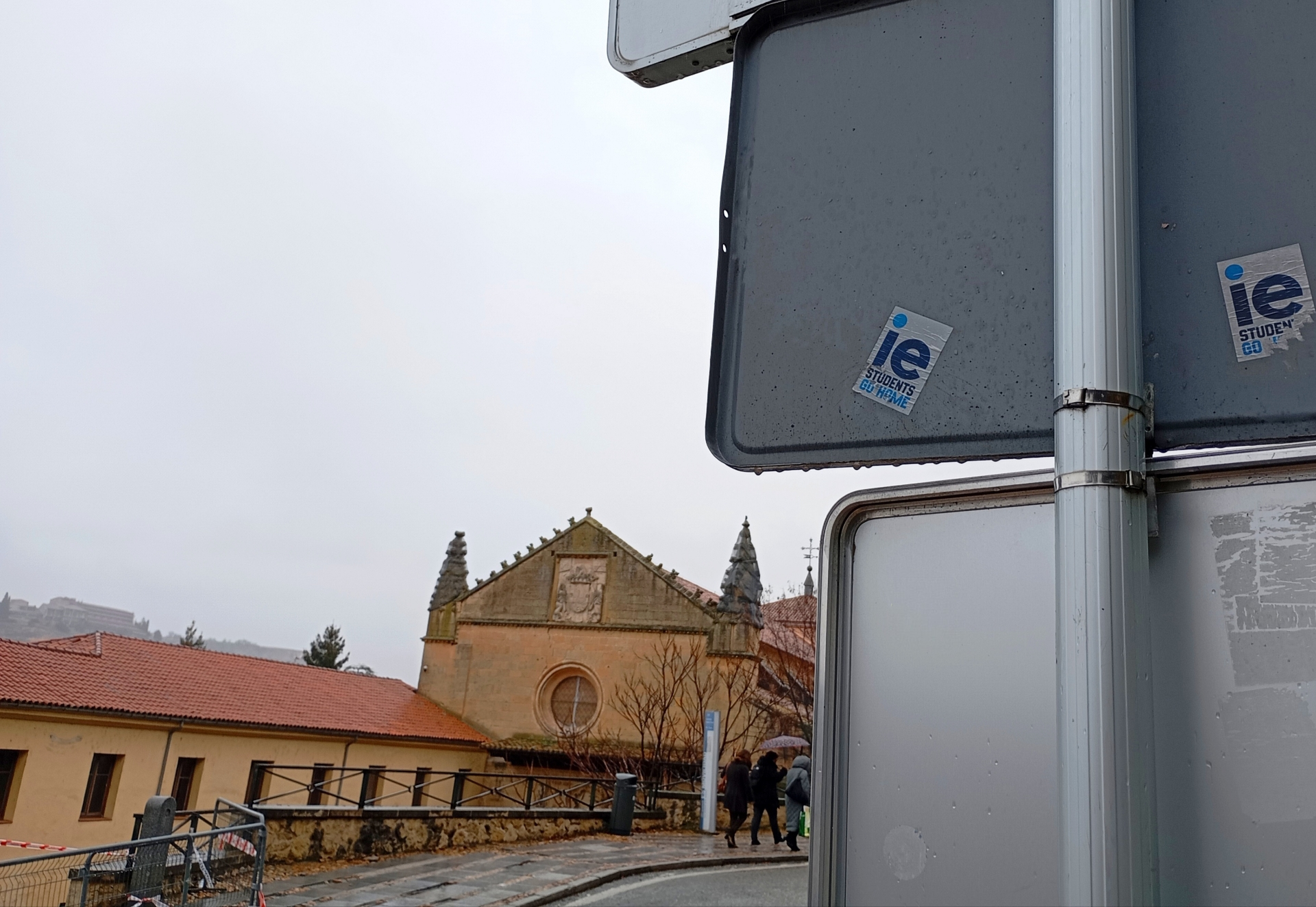
Two of the stickers next to the Segovia campus, in the background, calling for students to leave the city. These stickers, the result of social tension, are located throughout the city

The presence of the IE campus in the city of Segovia has generated a great deal of criticism from different sectors of Segovia, such as the residents of the walled enclosure, businesses and associations of police and politicians who have come to ask for its expulsion.

Among the main complaints are the exponential increase in rental prices in the city, which was the largest in Spain in 2023, the continuous noise from parties, attacks on police officers, dumping of garbage on public roads and the progressive expulsion of Segovians in the city old area in favor of students, illegally renting out the apartments as tourist flats. There are several proposals for student residences to alleviate the rental problem, but with continuous delays and students' preference for private apartments.

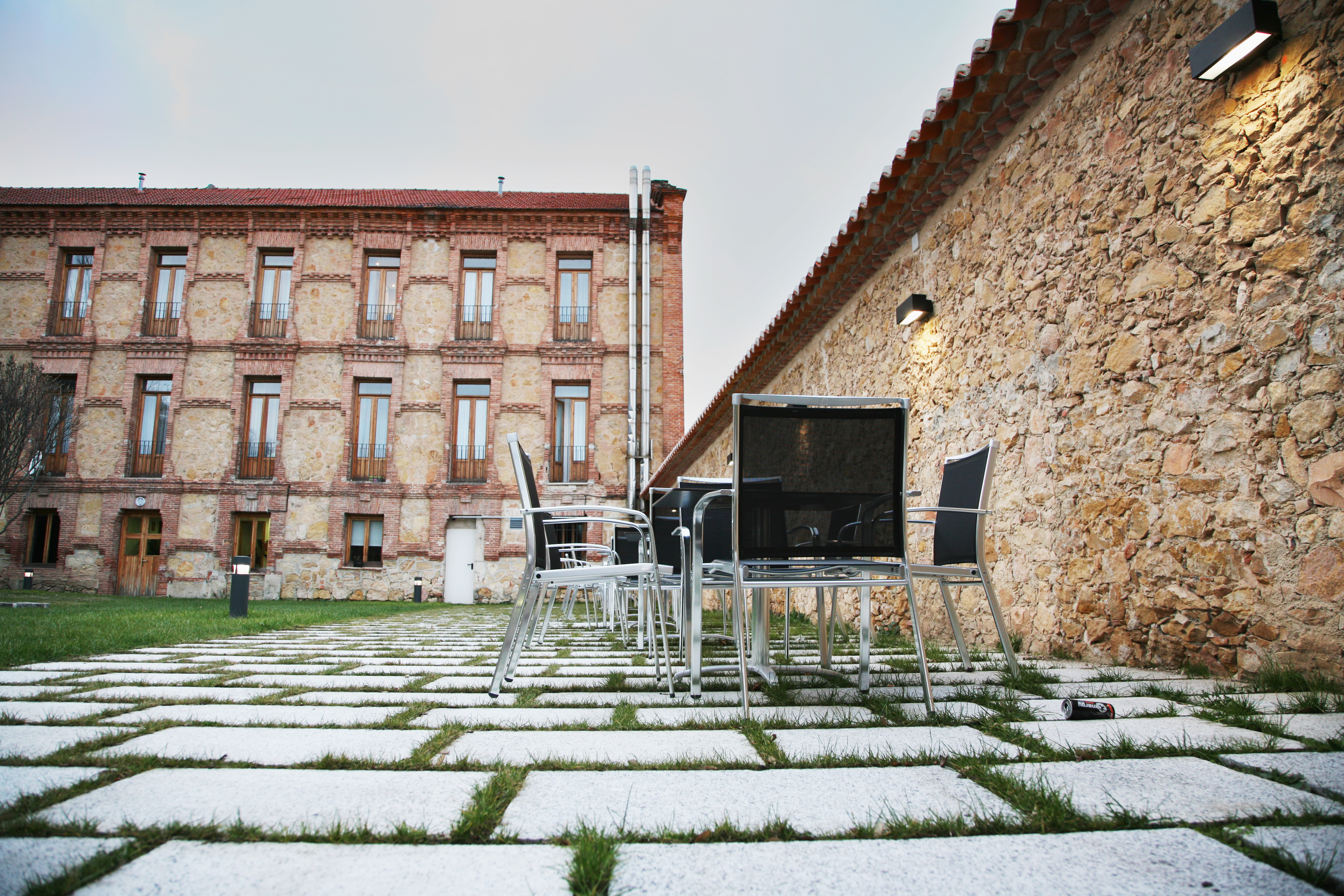
IE University Residence Patio, Segovia, Spain

== Madrid Campus ==
=== IE Tower ===
IE University's newest campus, opened in 2021, is situated at the 180 m (590 ft) Caleido tower in the Cuatro Torres Business Area of Northern Madrid, Spain. It is a technology-centered urban campus, and is the fifth tallest tower in Madrid and the seventh in Spain.

The tower has over 50,000 m^{2} (60,000 sq yd) of multi-use space, and has the ability to house roughly 6,000 students across 64 classrooms.

University rankings

Global – Overall
- QS World: 438 (2026)

Students have access to an auditorium, as well as various sports facilities and green areas. In 2022, the Caleido Shopping Center opened below and around the tower.

=== Maria de Molina Campus ===
The Maria de Molina Campus is situated on Calle Maria de Molina in the Salamanca neighborhood of Madrid, Spain. It serves the students studying their undergraduate and postgraduate degrees at IE University.

== Segovia Campus ==
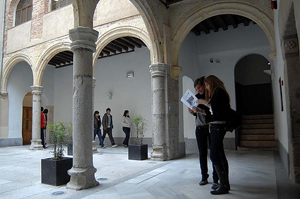
Students at one of the campus courtyards

The Segovia campus is situated in the Monastery of Santa Cruz la Real, located beside the Eresma River, at the foot of the old city walls that surround Segovia's historic quarter and a five-minute walk from Segovia's Roman Aqueduct of Segovia. The IE University campus has a surface area of over 18,000 m^{2} (22,000 sq yd).

=== Santa Cruz la Real Convent ===
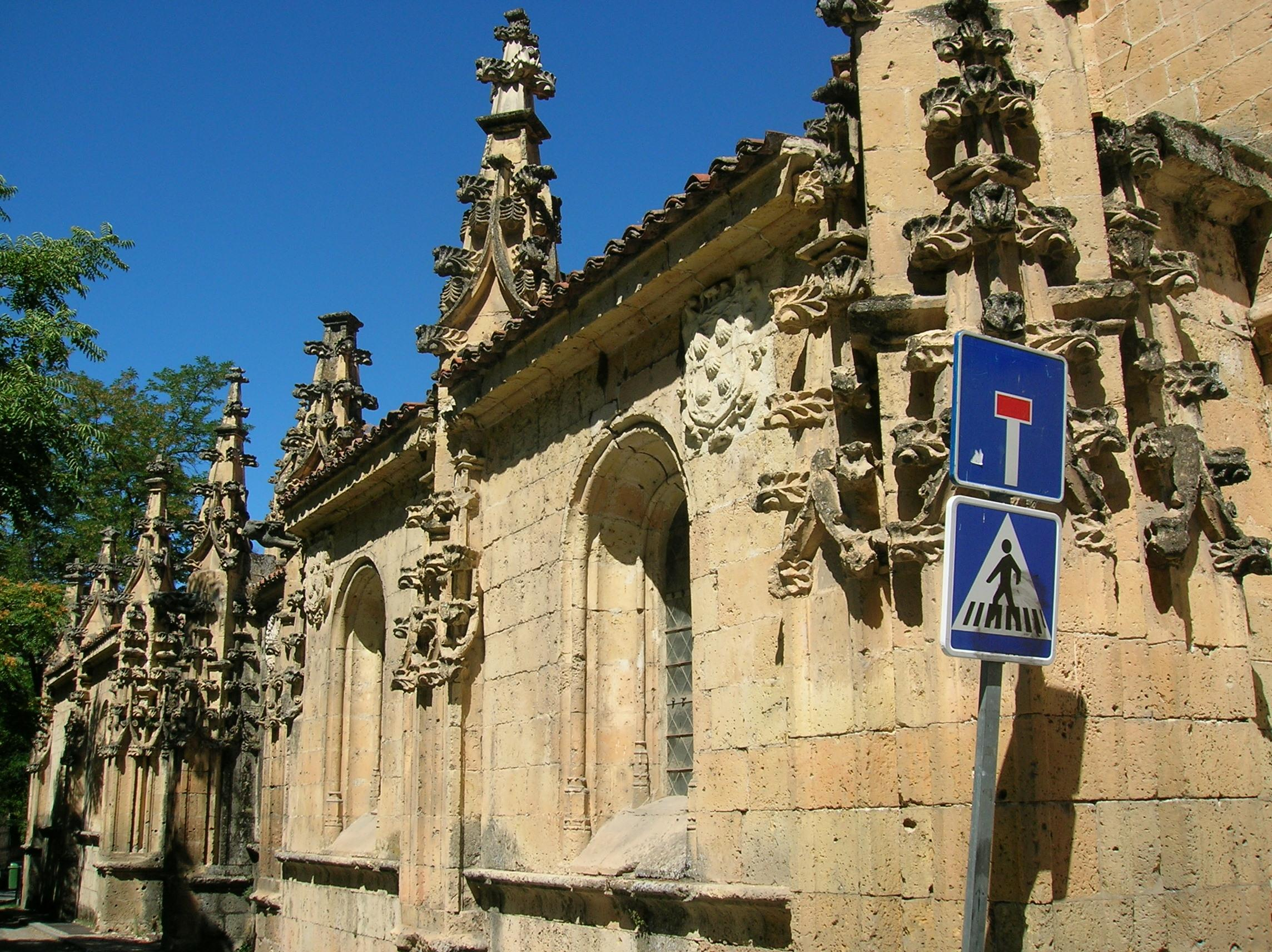
Façade of part of the university's old campus in Segovia

According to the Life of Saint Dominic of Guzmán, the Convent of Santa Cruz was the first to be founded by the Order of Preachers in Spain in 1218, just two years after the creation of the mendicant order of the Dominicans. Diego de Colmenares, a 16th-century chronicler, adds that Saint Dominic did penance in a cave near the river to the north of the city, outside its walls and that he founded the order in this spot.

The order's dedication to the holy cross also originates from the early times of this community according to Colmenares and other 14th century documents.

In the fifteenth century the Catholic Monarchs, as King Ferdinand and Queen Isabella were known, gave their patronage to the convent and this royal protection was what led it to be known as Santa Cruz “la Real”, i.e. the convent of the “Royal” Holy Cross. Although the city's institutions had played a part in the convent's development, the Dominicans were not a prosperous order until the Catholic Monarchs came to the throne, when they were given control of the Inquisition. The convent was rebuilt over the former 13th century Romanesque structure and the current church, with its monumental portal, was also erected under Friar Tomás de Torquemada, the first Grand Inquisitor and prior of the Holy Cross community.

The Dominican presence in the convent lasted until the monks were released from their religious vows as decreed by the minister Mendizábal in 1836. The convent then became a hospice and, until recent times, it was a nursing home for the elderly under the ownership of the Segovia Provincial Council. It has since undergone extensive renovation to house IE University.

=== Aula Magna ===
The convent church was designed by fifteenth century Spanish architect Juan Guas, and is a faithful example of late gothic architecture. It now serves as IE University's Aula Magna, being used for graduation ceremonies and conferences, as well as other key events.

== Student Life ==
=== Student Organizations ===
IE University is home to over 100 student organizations such as the Art Club, the IE Music Club, the IE Debate Club, and a leading regional chapter of the European Law Students' Association. Students are free to join clubs such as the Art Club, but may be required to submit applications (ELSA) or audition (Music Club).

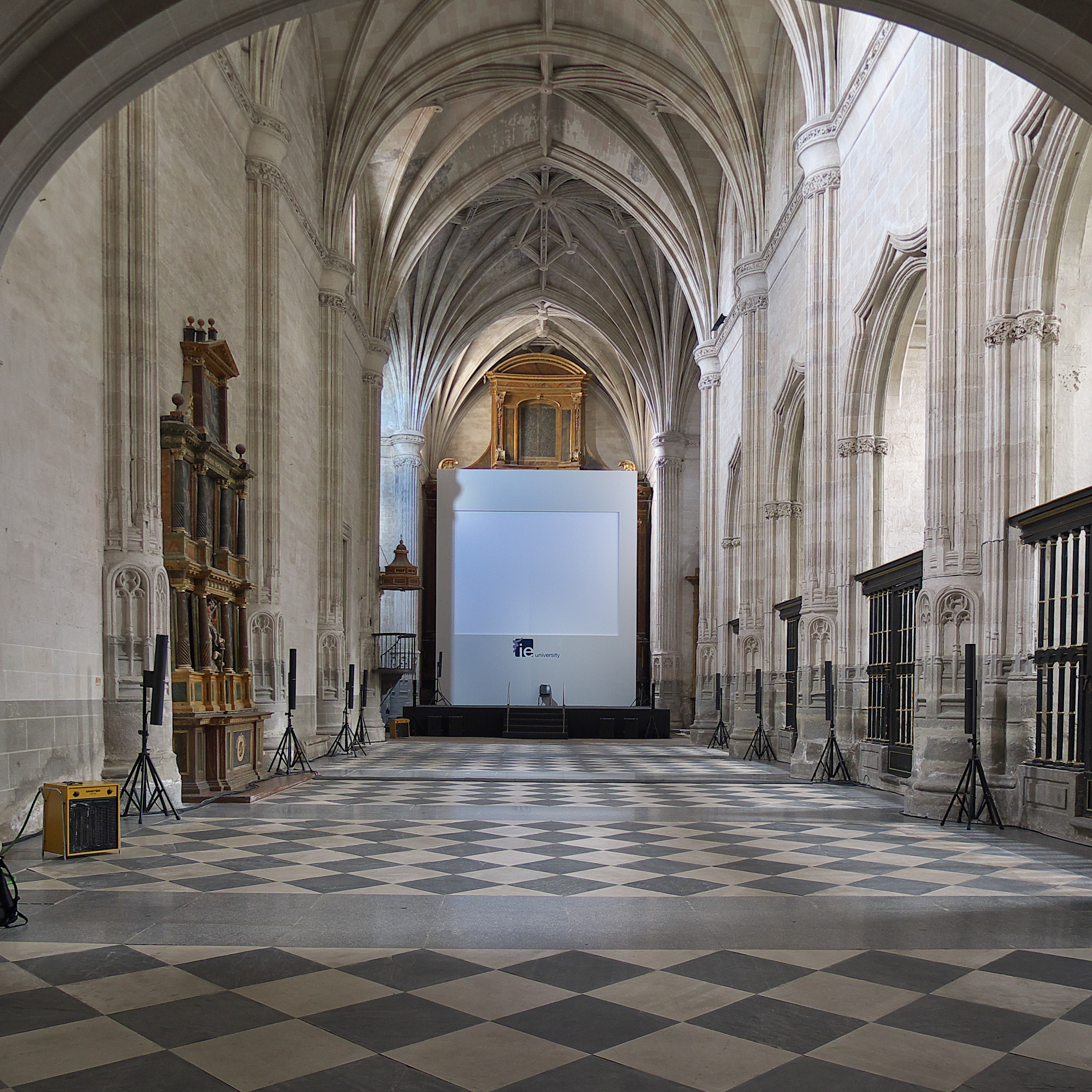
Aula Magna at the IE Segovia Campus

=== Student Government ===
Student government is held using a caucus system, where students vote for a group of students to represent them under one ballot ticket. The groups are usually around six, and campaign during the semester before they would take office. There are also various student boards, such as IE Law School's student Diversity and Inclusion Board.

=== Athletics ===
IE University offers various athletics which compete at the club-level in and around Spain and Europe. Athletics vary from basketball to indoor soccer.

== Programs of study ==
=== Undergraduate Programs ===
Bachelor in:

- Applied Mathematics
- Architectural Studies
- Behavior and Social Sciences
- Business Administration
- Global Bachelor in Business Administration
- Communication and Digital Media
- Computer Science and Artificial Intelligence
- Data and Business Analytics
- Design
- Economics
- Environmental Sciences for Sustainability
- Fashion Design
- Humanities
- International Relations
- Laws
- Philosophy, Politics, Law and Economics
- Political Science
- Dual Degree in Business Administration & Computer Science and Artificial Intelligence
- Dual Degree in Business Administration & Data and Business Analytics
- Dual Degree in Business Administration & Design
- Dual Degree in Business Administration & Fashion Design
- Dual Degree in Business Administration & Humanities
- Dual Degree in Business Administration & International Relations
- Dual Degree in Business Administration & Laws
- Dual Degree in Business Administration & Political Science
- Dual Degree in Economics & Applied Mathematics
- Dual Degree in Economics & International Relations
- Dual Degree in Laws & International Relations

Brown University offers eligible IEU students the opportunity to attend a joint two-week summer program in Providence, Rhode Island.
