= Moscow Automobile and Road Construction State Technical University =

Public university in Russia

- Московский автомобильно-дорожный государственный технический университет
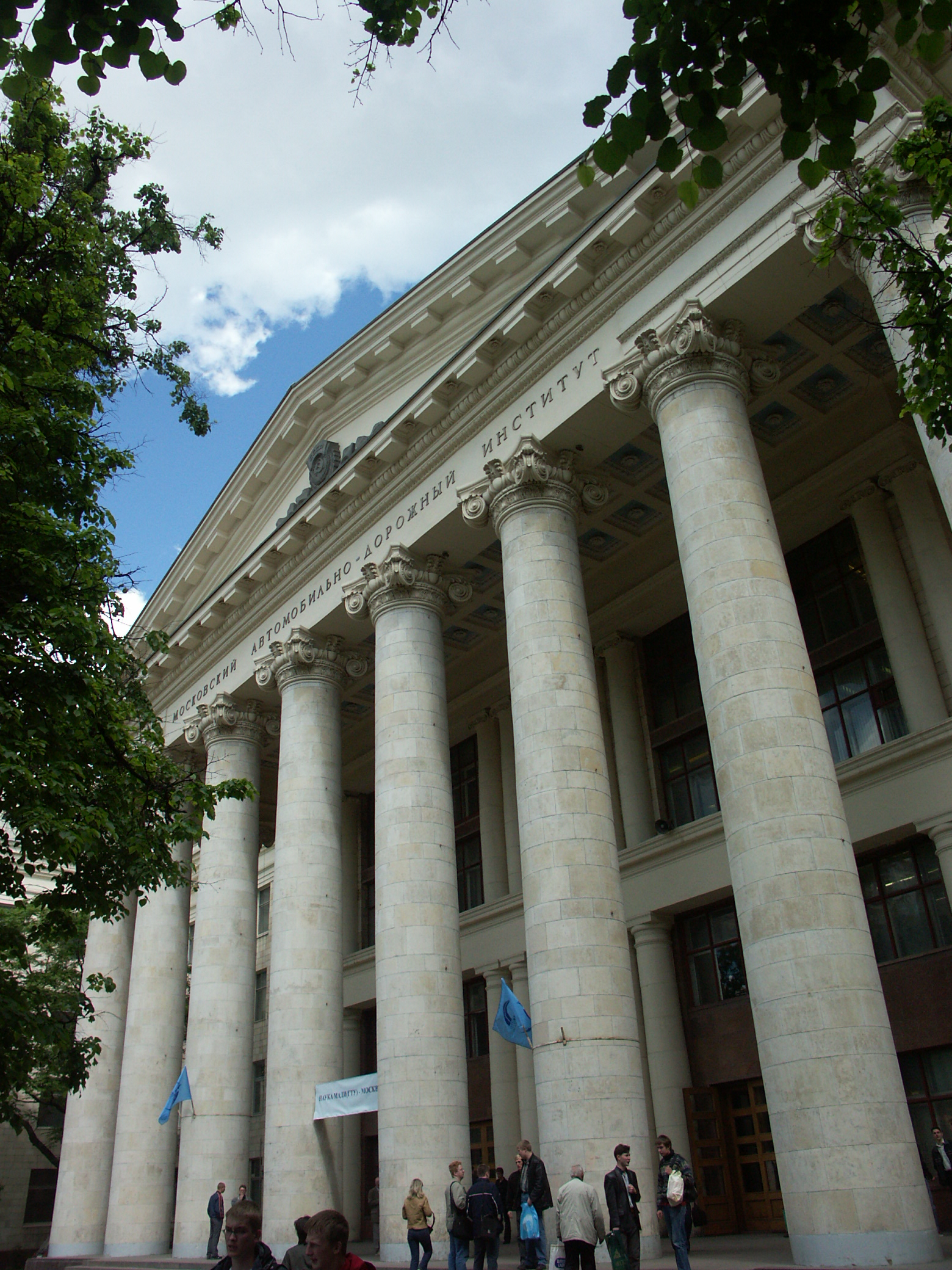
- Type: public
- Established: 1930
- Location: Moscow, Russia; 55°48′08″N 37°31′44″E
- Campus: urban
- Language: Russian

Moscow Automobile and Road Construction State Technical University (Russian: Московский автомобильно-дорожный государственный технический университет), commonly abbreviated as MADI, is a public university located in Moscow, Russia. It was founded in 1930.

== History ==
The Moscow State Automobile and Road Technical University (MADI) was established by a decree of the USSR Council of People's Commissars in 1930 on the basis of the Automobile Department of the Moscow Institute of Transport Engineers and the Higher School of Roads. At the time of its organization MADI had two faculties - road construction and automobile engineering. In 1931 the first graduation of 36 engineers took place.

In November 1987 on the basis of MADI was organized by the Educational and Methodical Association on motor and road specialties, which united 104 universities in 9 specialties and 9 specializations.

Since 1992 it has the status of a technical university keeping its traditional name. Scientific and pedagogical work was carried out by more than 800 professors and teachers, including about 100 doctors and about 500 candidates of sciences.

Since 2010 the Institute bears the new name - Moscow Automobile and Road State Technical University (MADI).

The university has four branches: Bronnitsky (1996, Bronnitsy, Moscow Region), Volzhsky (2000, Cheboksary, Chuvash Republic), Makhachkala (1998, Makhachkala, Republic of Dagestan) and North Caucasian branch (2005, Lermontov, Stavropol Territory).

The university has a number of research institutes. Among which it can be noted the Institute of energy and ecological problems of road transport complex, Institute of problems of road transport, Institute of materials and constructions, Institute of technology, standardization and certification of road-building materials.

The university educates students in 32 specialties and 9 bachelor's degree programs. Categories of graduates - bachelors, masters, engineers, managers. MADI maintains ties with road maintenance structures in Moscow and the regions. There are about 9000 students studying at the university.

== Structure ==
- Faculty of Road and Technological Machines
- Faculty of automobile transport
- Faculty of energy and ecology
- Road construction faculty
- Faculty of Economics
- Faculty of Management
- Faculty of logistics and general transport problems
- Faculty of engineering and mechanics
- Pre-University Faculty
- Preparatory faculty for foreign citizens
- Correspondence faculty
