= Russian Foundation for Technological Development =

Russian research institute

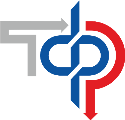
- Type: Fund
- Founded: 1991
- Headquarters: Moscow
- Key people: Mikhail B. Rogachev
- Website: www.rftr.ru

Russian Foundation for Technological Development (Russian: Российский фонд технологического развития) is the development institute of the Russian Federation which exists for more than 20 years and provides the financial support to science and technology projects and exploratory developments by means of the targeted debt financing.

== Activity ==
The Russian Foundation for Technological Development offers concessional repayment financing for a period of up to 60 months. Project selection is done on the basis of the contest results. The business entities shall grant the Foundation the possibility to control the purpose-oriented use of the funds received. Since March 2013, by the decision of the Ministry of Economic Development and the Ministry of Education and Science of the Russian Federation, the Foundation has acted as an organization providing support for the Russian Technology Platforms activity.

== Operating results ==
Support of RFTD gave a contribution to the development of such high-tech companies such as:

- SPA "Unikhimteck" (composite material)
- NT-MTD (manufacture of tunnel microscopes),
- RDC "Module" (creation of neurochips),
- Svetlana-Optoelektronika CJSC (LED equipment and instruments),
- Lazeks CJSC (navigational equipment), and others.

The Foundation, in cooperation with the organizations that coordinate Russian Technology Platforms with the assistance of the Ministry of Economic Development and the Ministry of Education and Science of the Russian Federation, prepared and published in English and Russian the information publications: summary booklet for the whole 32 Technology Platforms and separate booklets for each technology platform. The publications contain the information about the key technological directions, its organizational structure, participants, key results of activity and plans for 2012-2013 as well as the necessary contact details.
