= Monastery of Santa Cruz la Real =

Coordinates: 40.9529°N 4.1191°W

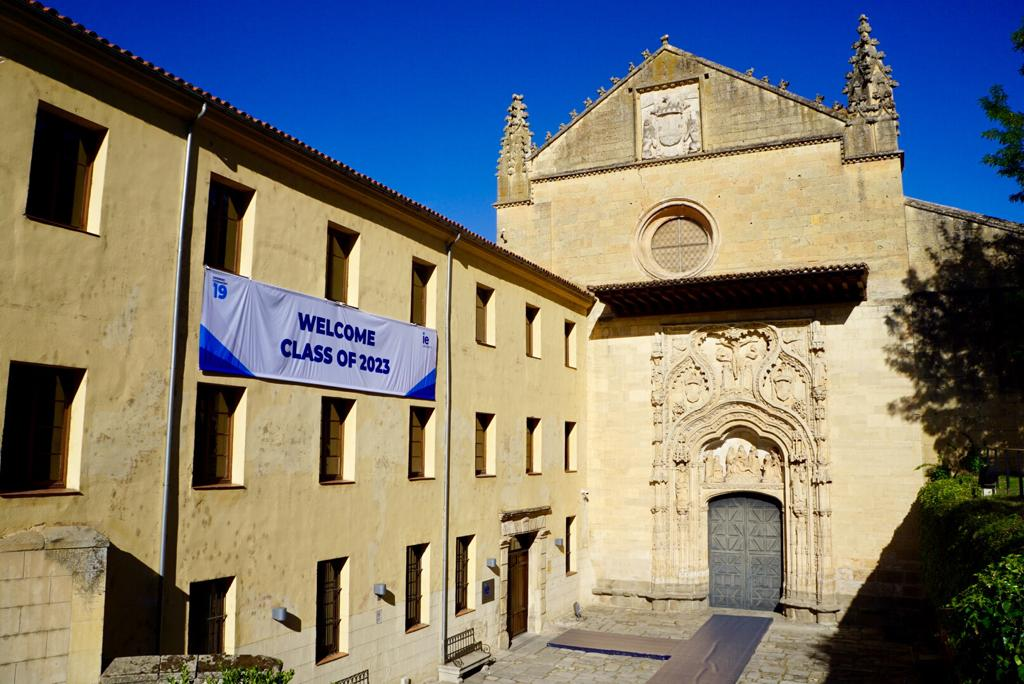
Western entrance to Santa Cruz la Real

The Monastery of Santa Cruz la Real in Segovia, Spain, dates back to the 13th century. It has undergone several renovations and currently houses IE University. In 1985, UNESCO declared it a World Heritage Site.

== History ==
=== 13th–14th centuries ===
Documentary sources attribute the founding of Santa Cruz la Real to Saint Dominic de Guzman, who "arrived in Segovia in late 1218, and around Christmas of that same year, founded what would become the first community of friars preacher in Spain, just two years after the mendicant order of the Dominicans was created." In the following decades, the Dominicans' popularity with Segovian citizens and the monarchy was enhanced by a series of miracles performed by Saint Dominic, such as bringing rain during a drought by giving a sermon. Consequently, on February 22, 1290, King Alfonso X of Castile (1221–1284) confirmed a privilege to the monastery of 100 maravedís every year. This income, later endorsed by Fernando IV of Castile and Alfonso XI of Castile in 1301 and 1372, respectively, began a series of grants for decades. For example, on July 6, 1326, the Segovian council granted the Dominicans wheat cuartillas.

=== 15th century ===
Although Segovian institutions funded the convent's development, the Dominicans did not truly flourish until the reign of the Catholic Monarchs of Spain, Queen Isabella I of Castile (1451–1504) and King Ferdinand II of Aragon (1452–1516).

In 1478, Isabella announced that in Seville control of the Inquisition would shift from Pope Sixtus IV (1414–1484) to the Catholic Monarchs. In 1492, the royals approved "the full expulsion of the Hispanic Jewish community," which meant "extraordinary financial gains for the friars of Santa Cruz."

The close relationship between the friars and the Crown continued in the reign of the Catholic Monarchs, who funded substantial "construction and refurbishment" in the convent:

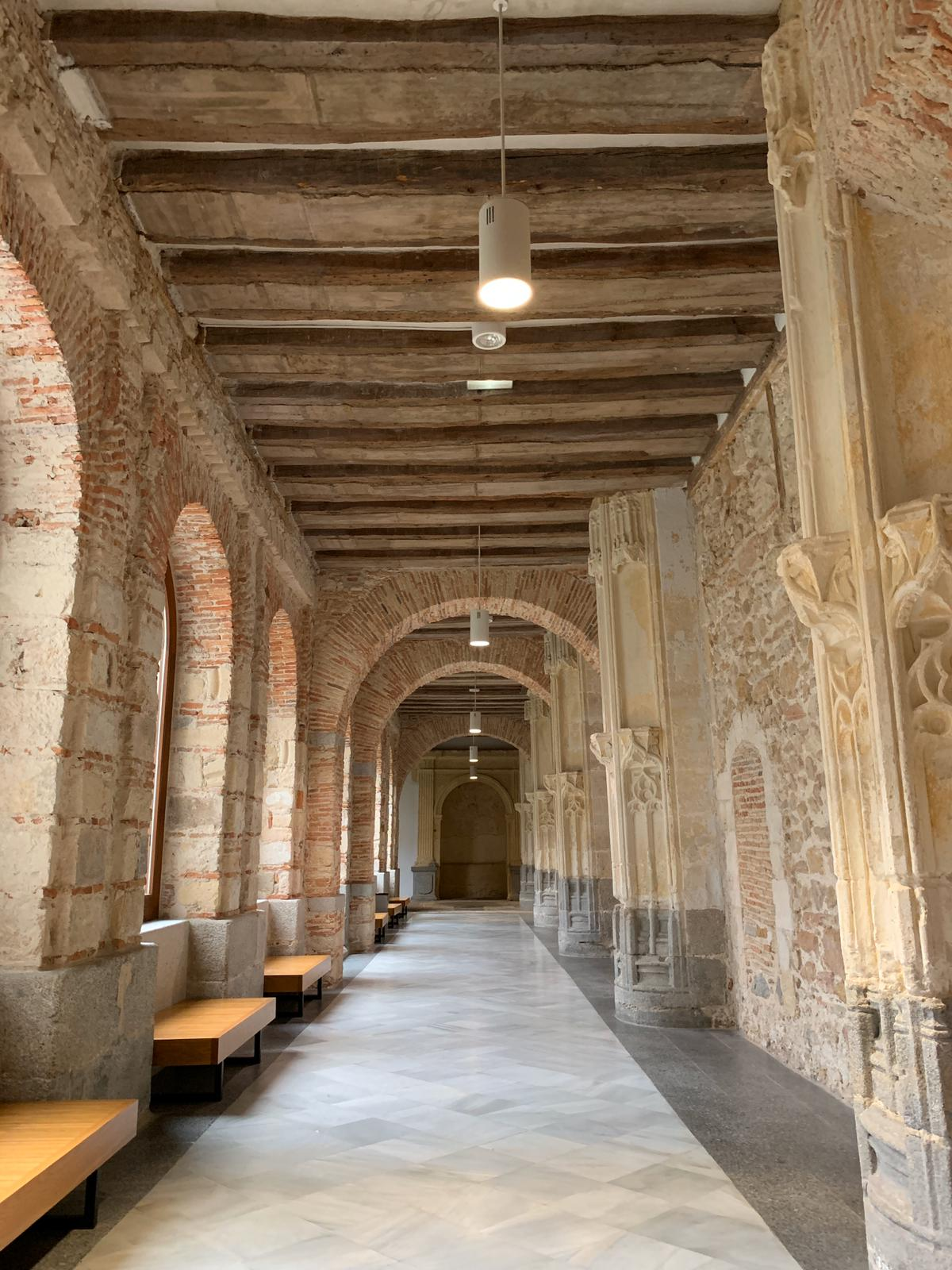
Renovated IE University hall

- "The church along its late Gothic monumental frontispiece"
- The cloister, representing that the convent had become more complex, "with areas devoted to secondary purposes, such as study and storage"
- The Chapter Hall, a chapel and meeting place where the community discussed important issues, dedicated to Saint Vincent
- The refectory
- The royal chapel of the "Saint's Cave"

The renovations by Juan Guas (an "architect who worked for the Crown of Castile between 1453 and 1496"), changed the building's style from Romanesque to a "Gothic-Isabelline style ... with the Catholic Monarchs as one of the central motifs."

The original structure served as a base for the newer architecture. Funding was obtained by Isabella and Ferdinand by seizing the income of Garci Gonzalez Gualdrafas, a Segovian merchant who in 1489 was burned at the stake for practicing Judaism.

The name Santa Cruz la Real derives from the "outright protection of monarchs (hence 'Real', Royal)."

=== 16th–20th centuries ===
During the modern era, the power of the Dominican convent of Santa Cruz la Real grew even more. This is shown by the creation of multiple chaplaincies by Cardinal Domingo Pimentel, the Bishop of Cordoba. Related to this expansion, there was an important increase in the convent wealth and economic activity. Indeed, monarchs annually granted alms worth thirty thousand maradevis to the convent. During the 16th century, numerous wills were made in favour of the convent. Furthermore, part of the convent was used for education and multiples professors taught there.

Santa Cruz la Real had a large art collection, all of which now belongs to Segovia Provencial.

The 18th and 19th centuries were hard times for the convent for two reasons. First was the ecclesiastical dissolutions and requisitions that in 1836 ended the presence of the Dominicans in the convent. Second, the 19th century was a period of war all over Europe with the Napoleonic invasion.

In 1836, the convent turned into a hospice and a nursing home for the elderly under the ownership of the Segovia Provincial Council. In May 1843, the Provincial Council established a charitable home for orphans in the convent.

In the late 19th century, the convent was left empty and unused. At the beginning of the 20th century, it suffered from several fires that resulted in its abandonment.

In June 1963, the Association of Alumni of Segovia Provincial Residence organized activities to preserve the memory of those who had lived in the home.

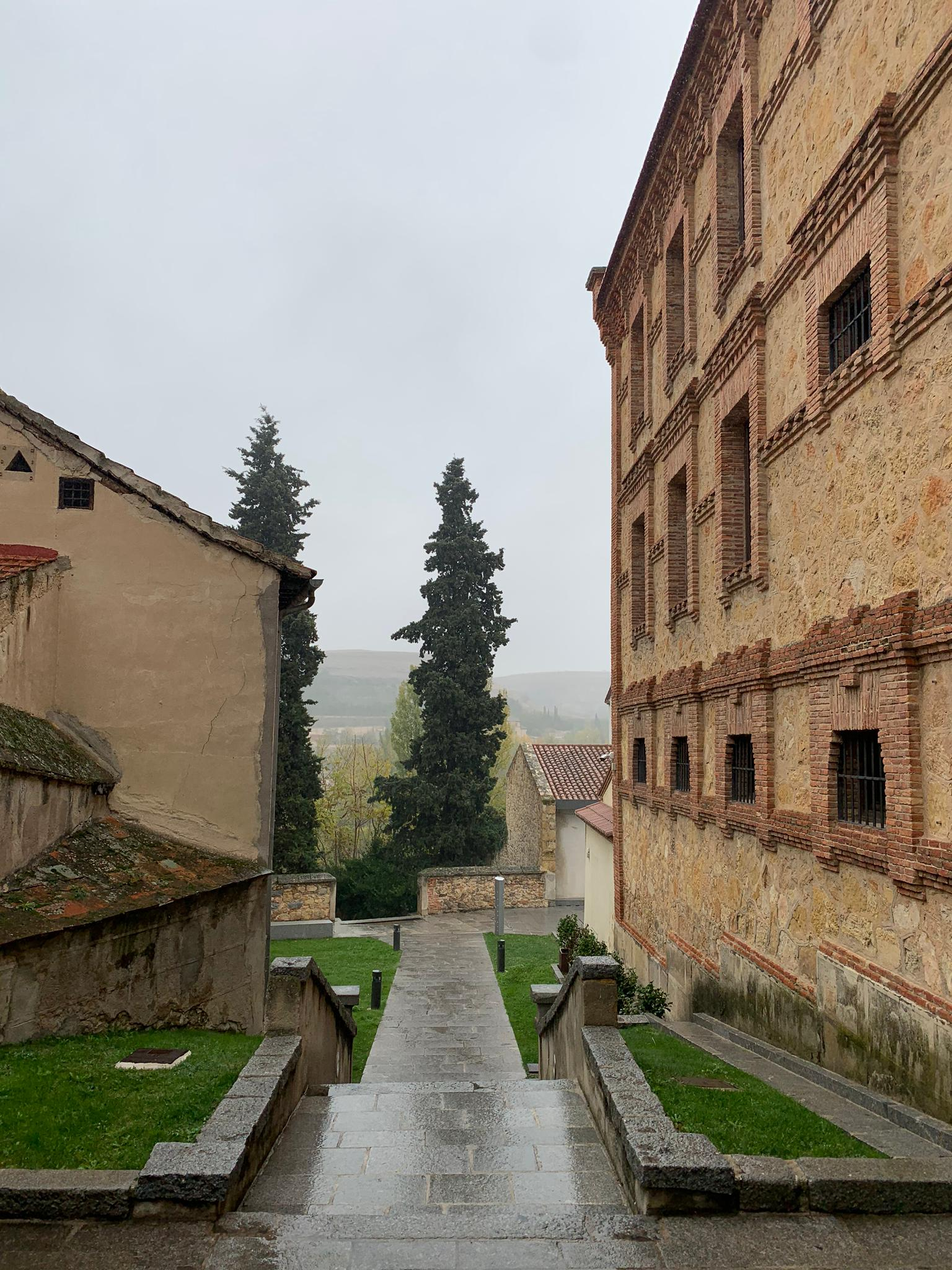
Main entrance to the IE University campus

In the late 20th century, the convent was extensively renovated and transformed into a campus of Instituto de Empresas (IE University), a private university with campuses in Madrid and Segovia.

== Architecture ==
=== Original architecture ===
Segovia is in the north of Spain and was declared a World Heritage Site by UNESCO in 1985. Segovia is known for its cathedrals, alcazar castle and aqueduct. Its historical sites are influenced by Romanesque art.

The convent was the first to be founded by the Dominicans in Spain in 1218, after the city of Segovia donated some houses to Santo Domingo De Guzman, which he used to create the convent. As the building was reconstructed several times, the architecture shows the true remains of the Romanesque times, leading to the Hispano-Flemish style extensions, followed by Renaissance-style cloisters, and finally to how it looks today.

=== Structures ===
In the 13th century, the old convent was rebuilt, followed by the church with its monumental portal, which was built under the direction of brother Tomas De Torquemada.

The Cave of Saint Dominic, located on the north side of the church, today is reached through an antechapel that was built during the period of the Catholic Monarchs. It used to be linked to the monastery by a tiny passage.

The convent contains a church, currently used by IE university as the main conference room. Both the refectory and the chapter room have been converted into conference halls.
