= 2004 in Portuguese television =

List of years in Portuguese television
- … 1994; 1995; 1996; 1997; 1998; 1999; 2000; 2001; 2002; 2003; 2004; 2005; 2006; 2007; 2008; 2009; 2010; 2011; 2012; 2013; 2014 …
- Art; Archaeology; Architecture; Literature; Music; Philosophy; Science; +...

This is a list of Portuguese television related events from 2004.

In 2004 programmes produced inside the European Union represented 6,3 per cent of Portuguese broadcast.

== Events ==
- 2 January - Nuno Norte wins the first series of Ídolos.
- 5 January - RTP2 is rebranded as :2.
- 25 January - Sofia Vitória wins the second series of Operação triunfo.
- 31 March - Radiodifusão Portuguesa and Radiotelevisão Portuguesa merge to become Rádio e Televisão de Portugal. At the same time, RTP1 gets a new logo.
- 31 May - NTV is rebranded as RTPN.
- 18 October - SIC Sempre Gold is rebranded as SIC Comédia.

== Ongoing television shows ==
=== 2000s ===
- Ídolos (2003–2005, 2009–present)
- Operação triunfo (2003–2011)

== Networks and services ==
=== Launches ===
Network	Type	Launch date	Notes	Source
Lusomundo Action	Cable television	16 April		
RTP Memoria	Satellite television	4 October		

=== Conversions and rebrandings ===
Old network name	New network name	Type	Conversion Date	Notes	Source

=== Closures ===
Network	Type	Closure date	Notes	Source

== Deaths ==
Date	Name	Age	Cinematic Credibility
8 July	Henrique Mendes	73	Portuguese TV host & actor
2 October	José Fialho Gouveia	69	Portuguese radio & TV host
