= 2014 in Portuguese television =

List of years in Portuguese television
- … 2004; 2005; 2006; 2007; 2008; 2009; 2010; 2011; 2012; 2013; 2014; 2015; 2016; 2017; 2018; 2019; 2020; 2021; 2022; 2023; 2024 …
- Art; Archaeology; Architecture; Literature; Music; Philosophy; Science; +...

This is a list of Portuguese television related events from 2014.

== Events ==
- 1 January - Luís Nascimento wins the fourth series of Secret Story.
- 2 February - Érica Silva, who finished in 4th place in the fourth series of Secret Story wins the second series of Secret Story: Desafio Final.
- 9 February - Berg wins the first series of Factor X.
- 27 July - Rui Drumond wins the second series of The Voice Portugal.
- 14 September - Remédio Santo actor Lourenço Ortigão and his partner Mónica Rosa win the second series of Dança com as Estrelas.
- 14 December - 14-year-old Diogo Garcia wins the first series of The Voice Kids.
- 31 December - Kika Kardoso wins the second series of Factor X.

== Television shows ==
=== Programs debuting in 2014 ===
Start date	Show	Channel
January 25	Os Vídeos Mais Loucos do Guinness World Records	SIC
February 2	O Beijo do Escorpião	TVI
February 3	Queridas Manhãs	SIC
February 9	A Tua Cara Não Me É Estranha: Kids	TVI
March 8	Mais Vale à Tarde Do Que Nunca	TVI
April 7	Giras & Falidas	TVI
April 14	Melhor do Que Falecer	TVI
April 25	Mulheres de Abril	RTP1
May 4	Rising Star - A Próxima Estrela	TVI
May 10	Sabadabadão	SIC
May 25	O Poder do Amor	SIC
June 1	Mulheres	TVI
June 28	Juntos no Verão	TVI
July 14	Água de Mar	RTP1
August 9	Sal	SIC
September 15	Mar Salgado	SIC
September 22	Agora Nós	RTP1
September 22	Há Tarde	RTP1
October 6	Grande Tarde	SIC

=== Programs ending in 2014 ===
End date	Show	Channel	First Aired
January 31	Querida Júlia	SIC	2011
February 1	Destinos Cruzados	TVI	2013
March 14	Doida por Ti	TVI	2012
May 1	Giras & Falidas	TVI	2014
May 3	Gosto Disto!	SIC	2011
May 11	Vale Tudo	SIC	2013
June 6	Mais Vale à Tarde do Que Nunca	TVI	2014
June 7	Os Filhos do Rock	RTP1	2013
June 13	Praça da Alegria	RTP1	1995
June 13	Portugal no Coração	RTP1	2003
July 14	Melhor do Que Falecer	TVI	2014
July 27	Rising Star - A Próxima Estrela	TVI	2014
August 2	Sabadabadão	SIC	2014
September 5	Belmonte	TVI	2013
September 21	Sol de Inverno	SIC	2013
September 26	Sal	SIC	2014
October 2	Boa Tarde	SIC	2010
October 4	O Beijo do Escorpião	TVI	2014

=== Television films and specials ===
First Aired	Title	Channel
January 2	Os Abutres	TVI
January 3	Regra de Três	TVI

=== Programs returning in 2014 ===
Show	Last aired	Previous channel	New/returning/same channel	Return date
Jardins Proibidos	2001	TVI	Same	September 8

=== Programs changing networks ===
Show	Moved from	Moved to	Date
MasterChef	RTP1	TVI	March 8

== Networks and services ==
=== Launches ===
Network	Type	Launch date	Notes	Source
AMC	Cable television	4 November		

=== Conversions and rebrandings ===
Old network name	New network name	Type	Conversion Date	Notes	Source

=== Closures ===
Network	Type	Closure date	Notes	Source
Bem Simples	Cable television	1 June		
