= 2017 in Portuguese television =

List of years in Portuguese television
- … 2007; 2008; 2009; 2010; 2011; 2012; 2013; 2014; 2015; 2016; 2017; 2018; 2019; 2020; 2021; 2022; 2023; 2024; 2025; 2026; 2027 …
- Art; Archaeology; Architecture; Literature; Music; Philosophy; Science; +...

This is a list of Portuguese television related events from 2017.

== Events ==
- January 21 - David Antunes wins the fourth series of A tua Cara Não me é Estranha
- January 29 - Carlos Sousa wins the fourth series of Secret Story: Desafio Final.
- April 19 - TVI announces that their fashion-specific reality series Academia de Moda has been cancelled due to the mediocre ratings of Let's Dance - Vamos Dançar and its spot would now be occupied by MasterChef Celebridades. It was set to premiere during May prior to the announcement.
- May 13 - Portugal wins the 62nd Eurovision Song Contest in Kyiv, Ukraine. The winning song is "Amar pelos dois", performed by Salvador Sobral.

== Television shows ==
=== Programs debuting in 2017 ===
Start date	Show	Channel
January 8	Secret Story: Desafio Final 4	TVI
January 8	Ouro Verde	TVI
January 15	Agarra a Musica	SIC
February 2	Brainstorm	RTP1
February 11	Let's Dance - Vamos Dançar	TVI
March 12	Pesadelo na Cozinha	TVI
May 20	MasterChef Celebridades	TVI

=== Programs ending in 2017 ===
End date	Show	Channel	First Aired
January 6	A Única Mulher	TVI	2015
January 21	A tua Cara Não me é Estranha	TVI	2016
January 29	Secret Story: Desafio Final 4	TVI	2017

=== Television films and specials ===
First Aired	Title	Channel

=== Programs returning in 2017 ===
Show	Last aired	Previous channel	New/returning/same channel	Return date
Inspetor Max	2005	TVI	Same	Q1/Q2

== Networks and services ==
=== Launches ===
Network	Type	Launch date	Notes	Source
Angelus TV	Cable television	May		
Nick Jr.	Cable television	2 November		

=== Conversions and rebrandings ===
Old network name	New network name	Type	Conversion Date	Notes	Source

=== Closures ===
Network	Type	Closure date	Notes	Source
Eurosport 2 Xtra	Cable television	28 February		
MOV	Cable television	31 March		
