= 2021 in Portuguese television =

List of years in Portuguese television
- … 2011; 2012; 2013; 2014; 2015; 2016; 2017; 2018; 2019; 2020; 2021; 2022; 2023; 2024; 2025; 2026; 2027; 2028; 2029; 2030; 2031 …
- Art; Archaeology; Architecture; Literature; Music; Philosophy; Science; +...

This is a list of Portuguese television related events from 2021.

== Events ==
- January 3 - Luís Trigacheiro wins the eighth series of The Voice.
- March 7 - Pedro Granger wins the second series of A Máscara.
- March 27 - Joana Albuquerque wins the first Duplo Impacto series of Big Brother.
- May 24 - Media Capital signs a licensing agreement with WarnerMedia to rebrand TVI 24 as CNN Portugal.
- July 25 - FadoAlado wins the sixth series of Got Talent Portugal.
- November 22 - TVI 24 is rebranded as CNN Portugal.
- December 31 - Ana Barbosa wins the seventh series of Big Brother.

== Television shows ==
=== Programs debuting in 2021 ===
Start date	Show	Channel
January 4	Amor Amor	SIC
February 22	A Serra	SIC
April 26	Festa é Festa	TVI
November 5	Glória	Netflix

=== Programs ending in 2021 ===
End date	Show	Channel	First aired
January 8	Nazaré	SIC	2019
February 20	Golpe de Sorte	SIC	2019
March 7	Terra Brava	SIC	2019
September 24	Amar Demais	TVI	2020
November 12	Bem me Quer	TVI	2020
