= 2024 in Portuguese television =

| List of years in Portuguese television |
- … 2014; 2015; 2016; 2017; 2018; 2019; 2020; 2021; 2022; 2023; 2024; 2025; 2026; 2027; 2028; 2029; 2030; 2031; 2032; 2033; 2034 …
- Art; Archaeology; Architecture; Literature; Music; Philosophy; Science; +...

This is a list of Portuguese television related events from 2024.

== Events ==
- January 7 - José Bacelar wins the eleventh series of The Voice.
- March 17 - Bruno Savate wins the second Desafio Final series of Big Brother.
- March 24 - Fátima Lopes wins the fourth series of A Máscara.
- April 7 - Sofia Rolao wins the eighth series of Got Talent Portugal.
- June 30 - Inês Morais wins the tenth series of Big Brother.
- August 9 - TVI Ficção is rebranded as V+ TVI.
- October 1 - SIC Novelas is launched as SIC's fifth thematic channel.
- October 10 - The Portuguese government announces plans to phase out advertising on RTP television channels by 2027.
- December 31 - Diogo Alexandre wins the eighth series of Secret Story.

== Television shows ==
=== Programs debuting in 2024 ===
| Start date | Show | Channel |
|---|---|---|
| February 5 | Senhora do Mar | SIC |
| March 25 | O Diário de Alice | RTP2 |
| June 18 | A Promessa | SIC |
| September 14 | The Floor | RTP1 |

=== Programs ending in 2024 ===
| End date | Show | Channel | First aired |
|---|---|---|---|
| March 30 | Flor sem Tempo | SIC | 2022 |
