= Débora Gonçalves =

Personal information
- Born: 19 February 1985 (age 41) Amadora, Portugal

Débora Gonçalves (born 19 February 1985) is a Portuguese-born basketball player and singer. She played on the Cape Verdean female basketball team in 2005.

Her singing career was launched on the TV program Ídolos in 2003. She also appeared on the first season of The Voice Portugal in 2011.
