= 2003 in Portuguese television =

This is a list of Portuguese television related events from 2003.

== Events ==
- 1 June - Sofia Barbosa wins the first series of Operação triunfo.
- 1 July - MTV Portugal, begins transmission.
- 5 September - The Portuguese version of Pop Idol debuts on SIC.
- 31 December - Fernando Geraldes wins the fourth and final series of Big Brother.

== Debuts ==
- 16 February - Operação triunfo (2003-2011)
- 30 August - Morangos com Açúcar (2003-2012)
- 5 September - Ídolos (2003-2005)

== Ending this year ==
- Big Brother (2000-2003)

== Networks and services ==
=== Launches ===
Network	Type	Launch date	Notes	Source
Fox	Cable television	1 March		
SIC Mulher	Cable television	8 March		
MTV	Cable television	1 July		
