= 2005 in Portuguese television =

This is a list of Portuguese television related events from 2005.

== Events ==
- 14 January - Sérgio Lucas wins the second series of Ídolos.

== Ending this year ==
- Ídolos (2003-2005, 2009–present)
- Operação triunfo (2003-2011)

== Networks and services ==
=== Launches ===
Network	Type	Launch date	Notes	Source
Nickelodeon	Cable television	1 June		
Record Europa	Cable television	1 October		
A&E	Cable television	2 October		
