= 1964 in Portuguese television =

This is a list of Portuguese television related events from 1964.

== Events ==
- 2 February - António Calvário is selected to represent Portugal at the 1964 Eurovision Song Contest with his song "Oração". He is selected to be the first Portuguese Eurovision entry during Festival da Canção held at Estúdios do Lumiar in Lisbon.
- 21 March - Portugal enters the Eurovision Song Contest for the first time with "Oração" performed by António Calvário.
