= Lusomundo Action =

Lusomundo Action was a Portuguese premium movie channel that started airing on 16 April 2004 and it aired action and horror movies. It was the third channel on the Lusomundo network. On 1 November 2007, the channel changed its name to TVC2. The channel is owned by PT Conteúdos, a television content producer that is owned by ZON Conteúdos.
