= HOT TV =

HOT
- Country: Portugal
- Broadcast area: Portugal

Programming
- Picture format: 16:9 576i (SDTV); 16:9 1080i (HDTV)

Ownership
- Owner: HOT Gold
- Sister channels: HOT Man; HOT Taboo

History
- Launched: 2 July 2009

Links
- Website: HOT TV

HOT is a Portuguese pornography premium cable and satellite television network owned by HOT Gold. Its flagship programming are Portuguese and international pornographic films.

== History ==
The channel held a launching ceremony on June 30, 2009 with the aim of replacing Latin American network Venus on the ZON platform, and held a launch party at a bar in Lisbon. However the channel was hampered by an authorization from the regulator, which was supposed to take place the following day. On July 1, an ERC council gathered following the launch party, eyeing the launch of the channel which was presented before being given a proper license. The channel was created following the expiry of ZON's contract with Venus; the initial plan was to launch the channel at the end of the year, but was accelerated following the end of the contract.

As of 2020, HOT has been violating the 20% minimum required for national content.
