= 1966 in Portuguese television =

This is a list of Portuguese television related events from 1966.

== Events ==
- 15 January - Madalena Iglésias is selected to represent Portugal at the 1966 Eurovision Song Contest with her song "Ele e ela". She is selected to be the third Portuguese Eurovision entry during Festival da Canção held at Estúdios do Lumiar in Lisbon.
