= 1968 in Portuguese television =

This is a list of Portuguese television related events from 1968.

== Events ==
- 4 March - Carlos Mendes is selected to represent Portugal at the 1968 Eurovision Song Contest with his song "Verão". He is selected to be the fifth Portuguese Eurovision entry during Festival da Canção held at Estúdios da Tóbis in Lisbon.
- 25 December - RTP2 begins experimental broadcasts.
