= The Voice Portugal season 1 =

The Voice Portugal
- Season 1
- Hosted by: Catarina Furtado; Diogo Beja (Repórter V)
- Judges: Rui Reininho; Mia Rose; Paulo Gonzo; Anjos
- Winner: Denis Filipe
- Winning coach: Rui Reininho
- Runner-up: Ricardo Oliveira

Release
- Original network: RTP1
- Original release: 29 October 2011 – 25 February 2012

The first season of the Portuguese reality talent show A Voz de Portugal (The Voice Portugal) premiered on October 29, 2011 on RTP1. The coaching panel consisted in singer-songwriter Paulo Gonzo, rock duo Anjos, YouTube sensation Mia Rose and GNR lead vocalist Rui Reininho. Catarina Furtado was the show host, and Diogo Beja was the season's backstage host, also known as Repórter V.

A Voz de Portugal coaches. From left to right: Paulo Gonzo, Rui Reininho, Mia Rose and Anjos

== Teams ==
Color key

- Winner
- Runner-up
- Third place
- Fourth place
- Eliminated in Live shows
- Eliminated in Battles

Coaching teams
| Coaches | Top 57 Artists | | | | |
|---|---|---|---|---|---|
| Rui Reininho | | | | | |
| Rui Reininho | Denis Filipe | Pedro Poseiro | João Pedro Rosas | Marisa Almeida | Celeste Cortez |
| Rui Reininho | João Castro | Joana Alves | Ana Margarida Teixeira | Sara Paço | Ricardo Martins |
| Rui Reininho | Ana Rita Inácio | Joana Leite | Ricardo Garcia | Luís Gaio | |
| Mia Rose | | | | | |
| Mia Rose | Daniel Moreira | Salvador Seixas | Deborah Gonçalves | Teresa Santos | Inês Martins |
| Mia Rose | Ana Carolina Veiga | Luís de Almeida | Rui Sirgado | Emídio Santos | Isabel Alexandrino |
| Mia Rose | Dina Alves | Ana Trogeira | Ana Carolina Silva | António Silva | |
| Anjos | | | | | |
| Anjos | Ricardo Oliveira | Carla Ribeiro | Joana Garcia | Vasco Duarte | Sara Henriques |
| Anjos | Luísa & Inês Silva | Bruno Francisco | Joana Barata | Rita Nascimento | Sara Ribeiro |
| Anjos | Bel Viana | Fábio Leitão | Jeanette Azevedo | Vânia Osório | |
| Paulo Gonzo | | | | | |
| Paulo Gonzo | Bianca Adrião | Joana Jorge | Sílvio Switha | Sandrine Orsini | Sílvia Silva |
| Paulo Gonzo | Salomé Caldeira | Rui Pereira | Pedro Coelho | Aline Bernardo | Joana Oliveira |
| Paulo Gonzo | Tiago Borges | Catarina Dias | Sandra Silva | Arménio Pimenta | Filipa Baptista |
Note: Italicized names are artists who won the wildcard and advanced to the Live Shows.

== Blind Auditions ==
Color key
✔ Coach hit his or her "I WANT YOU" button
Contestant defaulted to this coach's team
Contestant elected to join this coach's team
Contestant eliminated with no coach pressing his or her "I WANT YOU" button

=== Episode 1 (29 October 2011) ===
| Order | Contestant | Song | Coaches' and contestants' choices | | | |
| Order | Contestant | Song | Paulo | Sérgio & Nelson | Mia | Rui |
|---|---|---|---|---|---|---|
| 1 | Sara Henriques | "The Story" | — | ✔ | ✔ | — |
| 2 | Vasco Duarte | "Best of You" | ✔ | ✔ | ✔ | ✔ |
| 3 | Jessica Cipriano | "Born This Way" | — | — | — | — |
| 4 | Bel Viana | "Um Contra o Outro" | — | ✔ | — | ✔ |
| 5 | Pedro Dionísio | "A Cry 4 Love" | — | — | — | — |
| 6 | Salomé Caldeira | "Hallelujah" | ✔ | ✔ | ✔ | — |
| 7 | Deborah Gonçalves | "You Give Me Something" | ✔ | ✔ | ✔ | ✔^{1} |
| 8 | Inês Martins | "Rolling In The Deep" | — | — | ✔ | — |
| 9 | Celeste Cortez | "Careless Whisper" | ✔ | — | — | ✔ |
| 10 | Mónica Figueiras | "I Don't Want to Miss a Thing" | — | — | — | — |
| 11 | Salvador Seixas | "Use Somebody" | ✔ | ✔ | ✔ | — |
| 12 | Filipa Baptista | "Hurt" | ✔ | — | — | ✔ |
| 13 | Pedro Coelho | "Waiting on the World to Change" | ✔ | — | — | — |

^1 Mia pressed Rui's button.

=== Episode 2 (5 November) ===
| Order | Contestant | Song | Coaches' and contestants' choices | | | |
| Order | Contestant | Song | Paulo | Sérgio & Nelson | Mia | Rui |
|---|---|---|---|---|---|---|
| 1 | Denis Filipe | "Rain Down On Me" | — | — | ✔ | ✔ |
| 2 | Rui Sirgado | "Whataya Want From Me" | ✔ | ✔ | ✔ | ✔ |
| 3 | Carlos Banha | "Sonhar Contigo" | — | — | — | — |
| 4 | Bruno Francisco | "Where The Streets Have No Name" | ✔ | ✔ | ✔ | — |
| 5 | Isabel Alexandrino | "Human Nature" | — | — | ✔ | — |
| 6 | Joana Oliveira | "Crazy" | ✔ | — | ✔ | — |
| 7 | Rosalina Assanali | "Te Devoro" | — | — | — | — |
| 8 | Pedro Poseiro | "Ouvi Dizer" | — | — | — | ✔ |
| 9 | Inês Silva & Luísa Silva | "Forget You" | ✔ | ✔ | ✔ | ✔ |
| 10 | Ana Rita Inácio | "Valerie" | — | — | ✔ | ✔ |
| 11 | Ricardo Oliveira | "20 Anos" | ✔ | ✔ | ✔ | ✔ |
| 12 | Cláudia Costa | "Warwick Avenue" | — | — | — | — |
| 13 | Carla Ribeiro | "Tainted Love" | ✔ | ✔ | ✔ | ✔ |

=== Episode 3 (12 November) ===
| Order | Contestant | Song | Coaches' and contestants' choices | | | |
| Order | Contestant | Song | Paulo | Sérgio & Nelson | Mia | Rui |
|---|---|---|---|---|---|---|
| 1 | Ana Carolina Veiga | "Take a Bow" | — | — | ✔ | — |
| 2 | Bianca Adrião | "(I Can't Get No) Satisfaction" | ✔ | ✔ | ✔ | ✔ |
| 3 | Daniel Moreira | "The Blower's Daughter" | — | ✔ | ✔ | ✔ |
| 4 | Susana Pedro | "Flashdance... What a Feeling" | — | — | — | — |
| 5 | Vânia Osório | "Bleeding Love" | — | ✔ | ✔ | — |
| 6 | Rui Pereira | "Everlasting Love" | ✔ | ✔ | ✔ | — |
| 7 | Sofia Rebelo | "Just Like a Pill" | — | — | — | — |
| 8 | Ana Margarida Teixeira | "Empire State of Mind" | — | — | ✔ | ✔ |
| 9 | Sara Paço | "Call Me" | — | — | — | ✔ |
| 10 | Fábio Leitão | "Against All Odds (Take a Look at Me Now)" | ✔ | ✔ | — | — |
| 11 | Marina Sani | "Someone Like You" | — | — | — | — |
| 12 | Ricardo Martins | "O Que Faz Falta" | — | — | — | ✔ |
| 13 | Sandrine Orsini | "Whataya Want from Me" | ✔ | ✔ | ✔ | — |

=== Episode 4 (19 November) ===
| Order | Contestant | Song | Coaches' and contestants' choices | | | |
| Order | Contestant | Song | Paulo | Sérgio & Nelson | Mia | Rui |
|---|---|---|---|---|---|---|
| 1 | Joana Jorge | "You've Got The Love" | ✔ | — | ✔ | — |
| 2 | Ana Trogeira | "The Story" | — | — | ✔ | — |
| 3 | Luís Gaio | "Waiting on the World to Change" | — | ✔ | — | ✔ |
| 4 | Tiago Silva | "Slow Time Love" | — | — | — | — |
| 5 | Joana Barata | "Poker Face" | ✔ | ✔ | — | ✔ |
| 6 | Fábio Baganha | "A Vida Faz-me Bem" | — | — | — | — |
| 7 | Sílvio Switha | "I'm Yours" | ✔ | — | — | — |
| 8 | Filipe Maia | "Stop and Stare" | — | — | — | — |
| 9 | Joana Alves | "Go Your Own Way" | — | — | ✔ | ✔ |
| 10 | João Castro | "Hurt" | — | — | — | ✔ |
| 11 | Vanessa Oliveira | "Love Song" | — | — | — | — |
| 12 | Joana Garcia | "Someone Like You" | — | ✔ | ✔ | — |
| 13 | Luís de Almeida | "Busy (For Me)" | — | — | ✔ | — |

=== Episode 5 (26 November) ===
| Order | Contestant | Song | Coaches' and contestants' choices | | | |
| Order | Contestant | Song | Paulo | Sérgio & Nelson | Mia | Rui |
|---|---|---|---|---|---|---|
| 1 | Sílvia Silva | "If I Were a Boy" | ✔ | — | ✔ | ✔ |
| 2 | Tiago Borges | "You Give Me Something" | ✔ | — | — | ✔ |
| 3 | Liliana Pinheiro | "Sweet About Me" | — | — | — | — |
| 4 | Rodrigo Machado | "Chico Fininho" | — | — | — | — |
| 5 | Emídio Santos | "Daughter" | — | — | ✔ | ✔ |
| 6 | Dina Alves | "O Amor é Mágico" | — | — | ✔ | — |
| 7 | Jeanette Azevedo | "Just Like a Pill" | — | ✔ | — | ✔ |
| 8 | Ana Carolina Silva | "Sopro do Coração" | — | — | ✔ | — |
| 9 | João Pedro Rosas | "Roxanne" | — | — | — | ✔ |
| 10 | Filipa Sousa | "Beleza Rara" | — | — | — | — |
| 11 | Sandra Silva | "You Are the Sunshine of My Life" | ✔ | — | — | — |
| 12 | Daniel Fonte | "How to Save a Life" | — | — | — | — |
| 13 | Aline Bernardo | "Fast Car" | ✔ | — | — | ✔ |

=== Episode 6 (3 December) ===
| Order | Contestant | Song | Coaches' and contestants' choices | | | |
| Order | Contestant | Song | Paulo | Sérgio & Nelson | Mia | Rui |
|---|---|---|---|---|---|---|
| 1 | Joana Leite | "You Found Me" | ✔ | — | ✔ | ✔ |
| 2 | Rita Nascimento | "Whataya Want from Me" | — | ✔ | — | — |
| 3 | Marisa Almeida | "Hurt" | — | — | ✔ | ✔ |
| 4 | Inês Branco | "Billionaire" | — | — | — | — |
| 5 | António Silva | "Encosta-te a Mim" | — | — | ✔ | — |
| 6 | Patrícia Antunes | "Forget You" | — | — | — | — |
| 7 | Catarina Dias | "Could You Be Loved" | ✔ | — | ✔ | ✔ |
| 8 | Cheila Lima | "Crazy" | Team full | — | — | — |
| 9 | Teresa Santos | "The Only Exception" | Team full | ✔ | ✔ | ✔ |
| 10 | Sara Ribeiro | "Sopro do Coração" | Team full | ✔ | Team full | — |
| 11 | Estrela Fernandes | "Bubbly" | Team full | Team full | Team full | — |
| 12 | Ricardo Garcia | "Easy" | Team full | Team full | Team full | ✔ |
| 13 | Arménio Pimenta | "Jardins Proibidos" | ✔ | ✔ | ✔ | ✔ |

== Battles ==
Coaches begin narrowing down their teams by training the contestants with the help of "trusted advisors". Each episode featured seven battles and each battle concluding with the respective coach selecting one winner out of the two or three contestants; the seven winners for each coach advanced to the live shows. In a special wildcard round the coach had to choose two of his team that lost in the battle round of which the public would vote for one to advance to the live shows as the final contestant.

Color key
Battle winner
Battle loser
Selected for the Wildcard

Battles results
| Episode | Order | Coaches | Winner | Song | Loser(s) |
|---|---|---|---|---|---|
| Episode 7 (10 December 2011) | 1 | Paulo | Bianca Adrião | "River Deep - Mountain High" | Joana Jorge |
| Episode 7 (10 December 2011) | 2 | Anjos | Ricardo Oliveira | "Need You Now" | Vânia Osório |
| Episode 7 (10 December 2011) | 3 | Rui | Denis Filipe | "Last Nite" | Luís Gaio |
| Episode 7 (10 December 2011) | 4 | Mia | Teresa Santos | "Fazer o que ainda não foi feito" | António Silva |
| Episode 7 (10 December 2011) | 5 | Anjos | Vasco Duarte | "Feeling Good" | Jeanette Azevedo |
| Episode 7 (10 December 2011) | 6 | Paulo | Rui Pereira | "Don't Let the Sun Go Down on Me" | Filipa Baptista |
| Episode 7 (10 December 2011) | 7 | Rui | Celeste Cortez | "You Give Love a Bad Name" | Ricardo Garcia |
| Episode 8 (17 December 2011) | 1 | Paulo | Sílvio Switha | "You Shook Me All Night Long" | Arménio Pimenta |
| Episode 8 (17 December 2011) | 2 | Mia | Salvador Seixas | "I'll Stand By You" | Ana Carolina Silva |
| Episode 8 (17 December 2011) | 3 | Anjos | Inês & Luísa Silva | "Holding Out for a Hero" | Carla Ribeiro |
| Episode 8 (17 December 2011) | 4 | Rui | Ana Margarida Teixeira | "A Thousand Miles" | Joana Leite |
| Episode 8 (17 December 2011) | 5 | Mia | Rui Sirgado | "Moves Like Jagger" | Ana Trogeira |
| Episode 8 (17 December 2011) | 6 | Rui | Joana Alves | "Go Go Go" | Ana Rita Inácio |
| Episode 8 (17 December 2011) | 7 | Paulo | Sandrine Orsini | "Lady Marmalade" | Catarina Dias |
| Episode 8 (17 December 2011) | 7 | Paulo | Sandrine Orsini | "Lady Marmalade" | Sandra Silva |
| Episode 9 (25 December 2011) | 1 | Rui | Pedro Poseiro | "One" | Marisa Almeida |
| Episode 9 (25 December 2011) | 2 | Anjos | Joana Barata | "Dizer Que Não" | Fábio Leitão |
| Episode 9 (25 December 2011) | 3 | Rui | Luís de Almeida | "Angels" | Dina Alves |
| Episode 9 (25 December 2011) | 4 | Paulo | Salomé Caldeira | "Isn't She Lovely" | Tiago Borges |
| Episode 9 (25 December 2011) | 5 | Anjos | Joana Garcia | "Big Girls Don't Cry" | Bel Viana |
| Episode 9 (25 December 2011) | 6 | Mia | Deborah Gonçalves | "I Say a Little Prayer" | Isabel Alexandrino |
| Episode 9 (25 December 2011) | 7 | Paulo | Sílvia Silva | "Dançar na corda bamba" | Joana Oliveira |
| Episode 10 (1 January 2012) | 1 | Anjos | Bruno Francisco | "Drops of Jupiter" | Sara Ribeiro |
| Episode 10 (1 January 2012) | 2 | Mia | Daniel Moreira | "The Man Who Can't Be Moved" | Inês Martins |
| Episode 10 (1 January 2012) | 3 | Rui | João Pedro Rosas | "Foram Cardos, Foram Prosas" | Ricardo Martins |
| Episode 10 (1 January 2012) | 4 | Anjos | Sara Henriques | "California King Bed" | Rita Nascimento |
| Episode 10 (1 January 2012) | 5 | Mia | Ana Carolina Veiga | "Somebody Told Me" | Emídio Santos |
| Episode 10 (1 January 2012) | 6 | Rui | João Castro | "Here Comes The Sun" | Sara Paço |
| Episode 10 (1 January 2012) | 7 | Paulo | Pedro Coelho | "Somewhere Only We Know" | Aline Bernardo |

=== Wildcard ===
Each coach had the chance to nominate two of the battle losers from their team to have another chance of going to the live shows. The outcome was decided by televote.

Color key
Wildcard winner

| Coaches | Artists | |
|---|---|---|
| Paulo Gonzo | Joana Jorge | Sandra Silva |
| Anjos | Carla Ribeiro | Vânia Osório |
| Mia Rose | Ana Trogeira | Inês Martins |
| Rui Reininho | Marisa Almeida | Sara Paço |

== Live Shows ==
=== Results table ===
Color Key

| – | Contestant was saved by public's vote |
| – | Contestant was saved by coach's choice |
| – | Contestant was eliminated |

==== Team Paulo ====
| Artist | Show 1 | Show 2 | Show 3 | Show 4 | Show 5 | Show 6 | Show 7 | Finale |
|---|---|---|---|---|---|---|---|---|
| Bianca Adrião | Safe | —N/a | Safe | —N/a | Safe | Safe | Safe | 4th |
| Joana Jorge | —N/a | Safe | —N/a | Safe | Safe | Safe | Eliminated (Show 7) | |
| Sílvio Switha | Safe | —N/a | Safe | —N/a | Safe | Eliminated (Show 6) | | |
| Sandrine Orsini | —N/a | Safe | —N/a | Safe | Eliminated (Show 5) | | | |
| Sílvia Silva | —N/a | Safe | —N/a | Eliminated (Show 4) | | | | |
| Salomé Caldeira | Safe | —N/a | Eliminated (Show 3) | | | | | |
| Rui Pereira | —N/a | Eliminated (Show 2) | | | | | | |
| Pedro Coelho | Eliminated (Show 1) | | | | | | | |

==== Team Anjos ====
| Artist | Show 1 | Show 2 | Show 3 | Show 4 | Show 5 | Show 6 | Show 7 | Finale |
|---|---|---|---|---|---|---|---|---|
| Ricardo Oliveira | —N/a | Safe | —N/a | Safe | Safe | Safe | Safe | 2nd |
| Carla Ribeiro | —N/a | Safe | —N/a | Safe | Safe | Safe | Eliminated (Show 7) | |
| Joanna Garcia | Safe | —N/a | Safe | —N/a | Safe | Eliminated (Show 6) | | |
| Vasco Duarte | Safe | —N/a | Safe | —N/a | Eliminated (Show 5) | | | |
| Sara Henriques | —N/a | Safe | —N/a | Eliminated (Show 4) | | | | |
| Luísa & Inês Silva | Safe | —N/a | Eliminated (Show 3) | | | | | |
| Bruno Francisco | —N/a | Eliminated (Show 2) | | | | | | |
| Joana Barata | Eliminated (Show 1) | | | | | | | |

==== Team Mia ====
| Artist | Show 1 | Show 2 | Show 3 | Show 4 | Show 5 | Show 6 | Show 7 | Final |
|---|---|---|---|---|---|---|---|---|
| Daniel Moreira | —N/a | Safe | —N/a | Safe | Safe | Safe | Safe | 3rd |
| Salvador Seixas | Safe | —N/a | Safe | —N/a | Safe | Safe | Eliminated (Show 7) | |
| Deborah Gonçalves | Safe | —N/a | Safe | —N/a | Safe | Eliminated (Show 6) | | |
| Teresa Santos | —N/a | Safe | —N/a | Safe | Eliminated (Show 5) | | | |
| Inês Martins | —N/a | Safe | —N/a | Eliminated (Show 4) | | | | |
| Ana C. Veiga | Safe | —N/a | Eliminated (Show 3) | | | | | |
| Luís de Almeida | —N/a | Eliminated (Show 2) | | | | | | |
| Rui Sirgado | Eliminated (Show 1) | | | | | | | |

==== Team Rui ====
| Artist | Show 1 | Show 2 | Show 3 | Show 4 | Show 5 | Show 6 | Show 7 | Final |
|---|---|---|---|---|---|---|---|---|
| Denis Filipe | Safe | —N/a | Safe | —N/a | Safe | Safe | Safe | 1st |
| Pedro Poseiro | —N/a | Safe | —N/a | Safe | Safe | Safe | Eliminated (Show 7) | |
| João Pedro Rosas | Safe | —N/a | Safe | —N/a | Safe | Eliminated (Show 6) | | |
| Marisa Almeida | —N/a | Safe | —N/a | Safe | Eliminated (Show 5) | | | |
| Celeste Cortez | —N/a | Safe | —N/a | Eliminated (Show 4) | | | | |
| João Castro | Safe | —N/a | Eliminated (Show 3) | | | | | |
| Joana Alves | —N/a | Eliminated (Show 2) | | | | | | |
| Ana M. Teixeira | Eliminated (Show 1) | | | | | | | |
