= 1967 in Portuguese television =

This is a list of Portuguese television related events from 1967.

== Events ==
- 25 February - Eduardo Nascimento is selected to represent Portugal at the 1967 Eurovision Song Contest with his song "O vento mudou". He is selected to be the fourth Portuguese Eurovision entry during Festival da Canção held at Estúdios da Tóbis in Lisbon.
