= The Floor (Portuguese game show) =

2024 game show hosted by Vasco Palmeirim

- Genre: Game show
- Created by: John de Mol
- Based on: The Floor
- Presented by: Vasco Palmeirim
- Country of origin: Portugal
- Original language: Portuguese
- No. of seasons: 3
- No. of episodes: 31

Production
- Executive producers: John de Mol; Daniel Domenjó
- Producers: Vera Sacramento; Bruno Santos; Pedro Cardoso; Marta Gil; Patrícia Bakker; Gláucia Noémi; Vanessa Cunha; Ricardo Maia; Ana Delgado; Carolina Venâncio; Frederico Silva Pedro; Lara Peças; Paula Calado; Rafaela de Almeida; Francisco Carreiras; Mariana Figueiras; Sérgio Rodrigues
- Camera setup: Multi-camera
- Running time: 100 minutes
- Production companies: Coral Europa; Talpa

Original release
- Network: RTP1
- Release: September 14, 2024 – present

The Floor is a Portuguese version of the Dutch game show with the same name. The series is hosted by Vasco Palmeirim and premiered on September 14, 2024, on RTP1. The game is based around a floor grid of 100 squares. Each square is occupied by a contestant with expertise in a different trivia category. Pairs of contestants face each other in head-to-head trivia duels, with the winner taking over all territory controlled by the loser.

The game progresses over the course of a season with the grand prize of €50,000 awarded to the player who ultimately controls the entire floor. Secondary prizes of €2,500 are awarded throughout the season to the winner of the final duel with the two players with the most territory at the end of each episode. The played category is unknown until the end of each episode.

== Format ==
The season begins with 100 contestants standing in separate spaces of a ten-by-ten grid on the studio floor. Each contestant has a category in which they feel particularly knowledgeable.

One contestant is chosen at random and shown the categories of all opponents whose territories share at least one edge with their own, then the player chooses one of them to face in a head-to-head duel. The two contestants take turns identifying a series of images, words, or sounds associated with the challenged opponent's category. They are given separate 45-second clocks, only one of which runs at any given time, starting with the challenger. The contestant in control must give a correct answer in order to stop their clock and turn control over to the opponent. Multiple guesses are allowed without penalty, and a contestant may pass whenever desired; however, they must wait three seconds for a new image, text, or sound to be shown. Some categories are sound-based, requiring contestants to identify a specific sound or song.

The first contestant to run out of time is eliminated from the game and gives up all of their territory to the winner, who takes/retains the challenger's category. (Exception: If the played category has a limited number of images and both players manage to reach the end of the set of images, the player with less time remaining is eliminated.) The winner may then either challenge another opponent or return to the grid; in the latter case, a new contestant is selected at random from those who have not yet played a duel. When only two contestants remain, the one controlling more territory decides whose category will be used for the final duel.

From season 3, a contestant that wins 3 duels in a row has the option, to either receive extra 5 seconds to use in one of the next duels, or choose to switch categories with a competitor of their choice.

At the end of each episode, except the last one, the two contestants holding the most territory will battle in a final duel with a mystery category. This duel is not eliminatory. Therefore, the winner will win €2 500, and both contestants will return to the floor. The last contestant standing at the end of the tenth and final episode of the season wins the grand prize of €50 000. The overall prize money pot for the season is €75 000 (in seasons 1-2 €72 500).

Also, in the season's final duel, which involves a prize of €50,000 and will be contested by the two competitors with the largest playing area, also has a new feature, as it will be played in a best-of-three format.

== Production ==
On April 10, 2024, it was announced that RTP1 had ordered the first season and later that would be produced by Satisfaction Iberia and Coral Europa. The applications opened on May 22, 2024. The casting process proceeded until July 2024, when the production team selected the 500 best applications for a final casting to cast the 100 contestants who would be the first season's players. Season 1 was recorded in Lisbon during August 2024. On August 14, 2024, Vasco Palmeirim was announced as the host for the first season.

On August 29, 2024, Palmeirim conducted a press conference to present the new format in Portugal. On the same day, RTP1 announced that the series would premiere on September 14, 2024.

Before the end of the first season, the second was confirmed with Palmeirim hosting once again. Grilo was crowned the winner of the first season after winning the final duel of the last episode.

On July 10, 2025, RTP1 announced that the second season would start August 2, 2025.

=== Series overview ===
Season	Contestants	Episodes	Originally released		Winner	Runner-up	3rd place
Season	Contestants	Episodes	First released	Last released	Winner	Runner-up	3rd place
1	100	10	September 14, 2024	November 16, 2024	Grilo	Mª João	Paulo M.
2	100	10	August 2, 2025	September 20, 2025	Joao Pedro Silva	Eduardo Paquete	Viviane
3	100	11	August 22, 2026	October 15, 2025	TBA	TBA	TBA

== Season 1 ==
=== Contestants ===
The categories in bold represent the original theme of expertise of each contestant.

Results (Season 1)
Name	Nickname	Job	Hometown	Age	Category	Space Assignment	Duels	Duels Played	Final Duels Played	Episodes Won	Exited
Paulo Beirão	Beirão	Renovations manager	TBA	57	**Notable Figures**	48	1. Notable Figures - Ivo defeats Beirão (Ep. 1)	1	N/A	N/A	Episode 1
Diogo Peres	Diogo	IT recruiter	Amadora	32	**International Film-Makers**	17	2. Fruits - Alice defeats Diogo (Ep. 1)	1	N/A	N/A	Episode 1
Alice Santos	Alice	Marketing operator	TBA	53	**Fruits**; International Film-Makers	7	2. Fruits - Alice defeats Diogo (Ep. 1); 3. Appliances and Utensils - Alice defeats Luís (Ep. 1); 4. Toys and Games - Sandra defeats Alice (Ep. 1)	3	N/A	N/A	Episode 1
Luís Sá	Luís	Environmental engineer	Oliveira de Azeméis	48	**Appliances and Utensils**	8	3. Appliances and Utensils - Alice defeats Luís (Ep. 1)	1	N/A	N/A	Episode 1
Paulo Vieira	Paulo V.	Logistics director	Argoncilhe	45	**Inventions**	73	5. Invetions - Rita defeats Paulo (Ep. 1)	1	N/A	N/A	Episode 1
Ilda Passos	Ilda	Retired orthoptist	TBA	72	**Medical Devices**	41	6. Medical Devices - Fernando L. defeats Ilda (Ep. 1)	1	N/A	N/A	Episode 1
Fernando Lopes	Fernando L.	Events' producer	Porto	33	**Wedding**	51	6. Medical Devices - Fernando L. defeats Ilda (Ep. 1); 7. Back to School - Vítor defeats Fernando L. (Ep. 1)	2	N/A	N/A	Episode 1
Filipe Bragança	Filipe	Digital Marketer	Cascais	31	**Mammals**	84	8. Mammals - Bárbara defeats Filipe (Ep. 1)	1	N/A	N/A	Episode 1
Cristina Rodrigues	Cristina	Higher technician of safety at work	Guimarães	33	**TV Shows**	66	9. TV Shows - Hugo defeats Cristina (Ep. 1)	1	N/A	N/A	Episode 1
Nuno Pereira	Nuno P.	Basketball coach	TBA	37	**Sports Club Emblems**	76	10. Sports Club Emblems - Hugo defeats Nuno (Ep. 2)	1	N/A	N/A	Episode 2
Samuel Oliveira	Samuel	Full time father	Penafiel	37	**Foreign Topography**	35	11. Oscar Winners - Miguel F. defeats Samuel (Ep. 2)	1	N/A	N/A	Episode 2
Iolanda Santos	Iolanda	Commercial manager	Setúbal	37	**Bakery and Pastry**	1	12. Aquatic Animals - Magalhães defeats Iolanda (Ep. 2)	1	N/A	N/A	Episode 2
Miguel Ferreira	Miguel F.	Freelancer film-maker	Penafiel	25	**Oscar Winners**; Foreign Topography	25	11. Oscar Winners - Miguel F. defeats Samuel (Ep. 2); 13. Foreign Topography - Francisco defeats Miguel F. (Ep. 2)	2	N/A	N/A	Episode 2
António Quadrado	António Q.	Software developer	Alentejo	36	**Iconic Buildings and Constructions**	99	14. Portuguese Writers - Isabel defeats António O. (Ep. 2)	1	N/A	N/A	Episode 2
Hugo Matos	H. Matos	Turnaround coordinator	Porto	29	**Comedians**	56	9. TV Shows - Hugo defeats Cristina (Ep. 1); 10. Sports Club Emblems - Hugo defeats Nuno (Ep. 2); 15. Comedians - Fábio defeats Hugo M. (Ep. 2)	3	N/A	N/A	Episode 2
Sandra Andrade	Sandra A.	Marketing director	Cascais	49	**Portuguese Singers**	5	16. Portuguese Singers - Duarte defeats Sandra A. (Ep. 2)	1	N/A	N/A	Episode 2
Carlos Sousa	Carlos	Operations manager	Porto	26	**Junk Drawer**	39	17. Transports - Waldir defeats Carlos (Ep. 2)	1	N/A	N/A	Episode 2
Cátia Joaquim	Cátia	Designer	TBA	26	**Veggies**	13	18. Foreign Footbal Players - Sérgio defeats Cátia (Ep. 2)	1	N/A	N/A	Episode 2
Rúben Gonçalves	Rúben	Veterinary nurse	Faro	23	**Interior Decoration**	77	19. Jobs - António A. defeats Rúben (Ep. 2)	1	N/A	N/A	Episode 2
José Carlos Ferreira	Zé Carlos	Physical education teacher	Santo Tirso	55	**Sports and Modalities**	80	20. Portuguese Traditions and Habits - Paulo J. defeats Zé Carlos (Ep. 3)	1	N/A	N/A	Episode 3
Teresa Afonso	Teresa	Jurist	Vila Flor	48	**Plants**	43	21. Plants - Paulo F. defeats Teresa (Ep. 3)	1	N/A	N/A	Episode 3
Paulo Freitas	Paulo F.	Visual arts teacher	Madeira	45	**World Works of Art**	53	21. Plants - Paulo F. defeats Teresa (Ep. 3); 22. Wedding - Vitor defeats Paulo F. (Ep. 3)	2	N/A	N/A	Episode 3
Manuel Quintino	Manuel Q.	Electronics teacher	Setúbal	56	**Leisure and Free Time**	32	23. Leisure and Free Time - Vítor defeats Manuel Q. (Ep. 3)	1	N/A	N/A	Episode 3
Pedro Santos	Pedro S.	Commercial responsible	Vila Nova de Gaia	44	**Flags**	44	24. Flags - Vítor defeats Manuel Q. (Ep. 3)	1	N/A	N/A	Episode 3
Paula Lima	Paula L.	Math tutor	TBA	44	**Arithmetic Operations**	75	25. Album Covers - Alexandre defeats Paula L. (Ep. 3)	1	N/A	N/A	Episode 3
Alexandre Cardana	Alexandre	Supermarket operator	Torres Vedras	41	**Album Covers**; Arithmetic Operations	74	25. Album Covers - Alexandre defeats Paula L. (Ep. 3); 26. Bank Notes and Coins - João M. defeats Alexandre (Ep. 3)	2	N/A	N/A	Episode 3
Rodrigo Teixeira	Rodrigo	Graduate student	Faro	30	**Football Equipments**	54	27. Football Equipments - João M. defeats Rodrigo (Ep. 3)	1	N/A	N/A	Episode 3
Roseli Woth	Rose	Administrative	Brazil	59	**Brazilian Music**	18	28. International Film-Makers - Sandra defeats Rose (Ep. 3)	1	N/A	N/A	Episode 3
Paulo José Machado	Paulo J.	Industrial maintenance technician	Paredes	41	**Portuguese Traditions and Habits**; Sports and Modalities	90	20. Portuguese Traditions and Habits - Paulo J. defeats Zé Carlos (Ep. 3); 29. Sports and Modalities - David defeats Paulo J. (Ep. 3)	2	N/A	N/A	Episode 3
David Ribeiro	David	Flight attendant	TBA	42	**Bugs and Crawlies**	79	29. Sports and Modalities - David defeats Paulo J. (Ep. 3); 30. Babies and Children - Carla T. defeats David (Ep. 4)	2	N/A	N/A	Episode 4
Pedro Gonçalves	Pedro G.	Translator	Entroncamento	49	**Clothes and Accessories**	9	32. Clothes and Accessories - Afonso A. defeats Pedro G. (Ep. 4)	1	N/A	N/A	Episode 4
António Fonseca	António F.	Personal trainer	Braga	33	**Jobs**; Interior Decoration	87	19. Jobs - António A. defeats Rúben (Ep. 2); 31. Interior Decoration - Carla T. defeats António F. (Ep. 4)	2	N/A	N/A	Episode 4
João Martins	João M.	Graduate student	Porto	20	**Bank Notes and Coins**; Arithmetic Operations	64	26. Bank Notes and Coins - João M. defeats Alexandre (Ep. 3); 27. Football Equipments - João M. defeats Rodrigo (Ep. 3); 33. Arithmetic Operations - Hugo M. defeats João M. (Ep. 4)	3	N/A	N/A	Episode 4
Pedro Miguel Oliveira	P. Miguel	Industrial engineer	Felgueiras	35	**Religion**	72	34. Sports Equipment - Marco M. defeats P. Miguel (Ep. 4)	1	N/A	N/A	Episode 4
Rui Ferro	Rui Ferro	Maintenance and engineering director	Lisbon	54	**World Tourist Attractions**	81	35. World Tourist Attractions - Marco M. defeats Rui Ferro (Ep. 4)	1	N/A	N/A	Episode 4
Luis Alves	Luis A.	Banker	Odivelas	54	**20th Century Politicians**	62	36. 20th Century Politicians - Marco M. defeats Luis A. (Ep. 4)	1	N/A	N/A	Episode 4
Bárbara Leite	Bárbara	Real estate consultant	Cascais	51	**Portuguese Politicians**	83	8. Mammals - Bárbara defeats Filipe (Ep. 1); 37. Portuguese Politicians - Marco M. defeats Bárbara (Ep. 4)	2	N/A	N/A	Episode 4
Carla Gonçalves	Carla G.	Commercial director	São Tomé and Príncipe	53	**Snacks**	22	38. International Singers - Grilo defeats Carla G. (Ep. 4)	1	N/A	N/A	Episode 4
Marco Matos	Marco M.	Banker	Madalena	51	**Sports Equipment**; Religion	82	34. Sports Equipment - Marco M. defeats P. Miguel (Ep. 4); 35. World Tourist Attractions - Marco M. defeats Rui Ferro (Ep. 4); 36. 20th Century Politicians - Marco M. defeats Luis A. (Ep. 4); 37. Portuguese Politicians - Marco M. defeats Bárbara (Ep. 4); 39. Religion - Mª de Jesus defeats Marco M. (Ep. 4)	5	N/A	N/A	Episode 4
Waldir Silva	Waldir	Driver/Real estate agent	TBA	42	**Transports**; Junk Drawer	49	17. Transports - Waldir defeats Carlos (Ep. 2); 40. Junk Drawer - Paulo G. defeats Waldir (Ep. 5)	2	N/A	N/A	Episode 5
Ana Barros	Ana B.	Financial administrative	Alcabideche	51	**Royalty Members**	57	41. Famous Couples - Fábio defeats Ana B. (Ep. 5)	1	N/A	N/A	Episode 5
José Pedreira	José P.	Real estate consultant	TBA	60	**Black and White Cinema**	33	42. World Works of Art - Vítor defeats José P. (Ep. 5)	1	N/A	N/A	Episode 5
Vítor Augusto	Vítor	Mathematics teacher	TBA	27	**Back to School**; Wedding; World Works of Art; Black and White Cinema	42	7. Back to School - Vítor defeats Fernando L. (Ep. 1); FD1. Painters - Sandra defeats Vítor (Ep. 1); 22. Wedding - Vitor defeats Paulo F. (Ep. 3); 23. Leisure and Free Time - Vitor defeats Manuel Q. (Ep. 3); 24. Flags - Vitor defeats Pedro S. (Ep. 3); FD3. Types of Shoes - Sandra defeats Vítor (Ep. 3); FD4. TV Series Openings - Vítor defeats Mª de Jesus (Ep. 4); 42. World Works of Art - Vítor defeats José P. (Ep. 5); 43. Snacks - Grilo defeats Vítor (Ep. 5)	6	3	Episode 4	Episode 5
Tiago Ribeiro	Tiago	Graduate student	Guimarães	22	**English**	94	44. World Leaders - Mª de Jesus defeats Tiago (Ep. 5)	1	N/A	N/A	Episode 5
Maria de Jesus Silva	Mª de Jesus	Retired banker	Charneca de Caparica	65	**World Leaders**; English	52	39. Religion - Mª de Jesus defeats Marco M. (Ep. 4); FD4. TV Series Openings - Vítor defeats Mª de Jesus (Ep. 4); 44. World Leaders - Mª de Jesus defeats Tiago (Ep. 5); 45. Festival da Canção - Patrícia defeats Mª de Jesus (Ep. 5)	3	1	N/A	Episode 5
Miguel Rocha	Miguel R.	Civil engineer	Vila Nova de Gaia	53	**Famous Duos**	19	46. Famous Duos - Marco D. defeats Miguel R. (Ep. 5)	1	N/A	N/A	Episode 5
Manuel Vicente	Manuel V.	Retired telephonist	TBA	71	**Mythological Figures**	61	47. English - Patrícia defeats Manuel V. (Ep. 5)	1	N/A	N/A	Episode 5
Marco Gomes	Marco G.	Operations responsible	Lisbon	41	**Movie Titles**	97	48. Famous Animals - Afonso C. defeats Marco G. (Ep. 5)	1	N/A	N/A	Episode 5
Fábio Pina	Fábio	Organizational happiness manager	TBA	37	**Famous Couples**; Royalty Members	65	15. Comedians - Fábio defeats Hugo M. (Ep. 2); FD2. Beards and Mustaches - Fábio defeats Sandra. (Ep. 2); 41. Famous Couples - Fábio defeats Ana B. (Ep. 5); 49. Royalty Members - Catarina defeats Fábio (Ep. 5)	3	1	Episode 2	Episode 5
Carla Teixeira	Carla T.	Clerk	Chaves	35	**Babies and Children**; Bugs and Crawlies	78	30. Babies and Children - Carla T. defeats David (Ep. 4); 31. Interior Decoration - Carla T. defeats António F. (Ep. 4); 50. Bugs and Crawlies - Jorge defeats Carla T. (Ep. 6)	3	N/A	N/A	Episode 6
Patrícia Rodrigues	Patrícia	Admnistrative	Abrantes	43	**Festival da Canção**; English; Mythological Figures	71	45. Festival da Canção - Patrícia defeats Mª de Jesus (Ep. 5); 47. English - Patrícia defeats Manuel V. (Ep. 5); FD5. Movie Soundtracks - Grilo defeats Patrícia (Ep. 5); 51. Mythological Figures - Carla R. defeats Patrícia (Ep. 6)	3	1	N/A	Episode 6
Guilherme Martins	Guilherme	PhD student	São Domingos de Rana	25	**Rappers**	11	52. Bakery and Pastry - Magalhães defeats Guilherme (Ep. 6)	1	N/A	N/A	Episode 6
Jorge Fernandes	Jorge	Electrical engineer	Guimarães	50	**Car Mechanics**	67	50. Bugs and Crawlies - Jorge defeats Carla T. (Ep. 6); 53. Car Mechanics - Ricardo S. defeats Jorge (Ep. 6)	2	N/A	N/A	Episode 6
Sérgio Silva	Sérgio	HR technician	Amsterdam	28	**Foreign Football Players**; Veggies	14	18. Foreign Footbal Players - Sérgio defeats Cátia (Ep. 2); 54. Veggies - Nuno S. defeats Sérgio (Ep. 6)	2	N/A	N/A	Episode 6
Nuno Santos	Nuno S.	Entrepreneur	Viseu	53	**Birds**	15	54. Veggies - Nuno S. defeats Sérgio (Ep. 6); 55. Football Coaches - Marco V. defeats Nuno S. (Ep. 6)	2	N/A	N/A	Episode 6
Vicente Banha	Vicente	Chemical engineer	Alvito	60	**Beach**	24	56. Beach - Marco V. defeats Vicente (Ep. 6)	1	N/A	N/A	Episode 6
Marco Vansconcelos	Marco V.	Nurse	Vila Nova de Gaia	36	**Football Coaches**; Birds	12	55. Football Coaches - Marco V. defeats Nuno S. (Ep. 6); 56. Beach - Marco V. defeats Vicente (Ep. 6); 57. Rappers - Magalhães defeats Marco V. (Ep. 6)	3	N/A	N/A	Episode 6
Rui Santos	Rui S.	Banker	TBA	45	**Cinema Characters**	4	58. Cinema Characters - Paulo M. defeats Rui S. (Ep. 6)	1	N/A	N/A	Episode 6
Isabel Pinheiro	Isabel	Higher technician of communication	Lisbon	47	**Portuguese Writers**; Iconic Buildings and Constructions	98	14. Portuguese Writers - Isabel defeats António O. (Ep. 2); 59. Iconic Buildings and Constructions - João R. defeats Isabel (Ep. 6)	2	N/A	N/A	Episode 6
Rogério Martins	Rogério	Services' manager	TBA	51	**Musical Instruments**	70	60. Musical Instruments - Afonso F. defeats Rogério (Ep. 7)	1	N/A	N/A	Episode 7
Bruno Durão	Bruno	Administrative coordinator	Lisbon	41	**Peoples of the World**	31	61. Black and White Cinema - Grilo defeats Bruno (Ep. 7)	1	N/A	N/A	Episode 7
Rui Fialho	Rui F.	Real state agent	Vidigueira	47	**Appetizers**	93	62. Portuguese Gastronomy - Carla R. defeats Rui F. (Ep. 7)	1	N/A	N/A	Episode 7
Luísa Ferreira	Luísa	Communication technician	TBA	54	**80s Movie and TV Stars**	37	63. Desserts and Sweets - Ricardo P. defeats Luísa (Ep. 7)	1	N/A	N/A	Episode 7
Sandra Nunes	Sandra	Jurist	Lisbon	49	**Games and Toys**; International Film-Makers; Brazilian Music	16	4. Toys and Games - Sandra defeats Alice (Ep. 1); FD1. Painters - Sandra defeats Vítor (Ep. 1); FD2. Beards and Mustaches - Fábio defeats Sandra. (Ep. 2); 28. International Film-Makers - Sandra defeats Rose (Ep. 3); FD3. Types of Shoes - Sandra defeats Vítor (Ep. 3); 64. Brazilian Music - Ricardo P. defeats Sandra (Ep. 7)	3	3	Episode 1 Episode 3	Episode 7
Ricardo Pinto	Ricardo P.	Software development manager	Matosinhos	42	**Desserts and Sweets**; 80s Movie and TV Stars	27	63. Desserts and Sweets - Ricardo P. defeats Luísa (Ep. 7); 64. Brazilian Music - Ricardo P. defeats Sandra (Ep. 7); 65. Birds - Magalhães defeats Ricardo P. (Ep. 7)	3	N/A	N/A	Episode 7
César Escobar	César	Informatic consultant	Azores	40	**Bands**	40	66. Islands and Archipelagos - Paulo G. defeats César (Ep. 7)	1	N/A	N/A	Episode 7
Hugo Soares	Hugo S.	Graduate student	TBA	22	**Portuguese Football Players**	88	67. Portuguese Olympic Athletes - Ricardo S. defeats Hugo S. (Ep. 7)	1	N/A	N/A	Episode 7
Ricardo Santos	Ricardo S.	PE teacher	Lagoa	41	**Portuguese Olympic Athletes**; Portuguese Football Players	68	53. Car Mechanics - Ricardo S. defeats Jorge (Ep. 6); 67. Portuguese Olympic Athletes - Ricardo S. defeats Hugo S. (Ep. 7); 68. Popular Portuguese Music - Catarina defeats Ricardo S. (Ep. 7)	3	N/A	N/A	Episode 7
Catarina Machado	Catarina	Flight attendant	Vila Pouca de Aguiar	37	**Popular Portuguese Music**; Portuguese Football Players	46	49. Royalty Members - Catarina defeats Fábio (Ep. 5); 68. Popular Portuguese Music - Catarina defeats Ricardo S. (Ep. 7); 69. Grocery Store - Ana N. defeats Catarina (Ep. 7)	3	N/A	N/A	Episode 7
Ana Neiva	Ana N.	Graduate student	Viana do Castelo	26	**Grocery Store**; Portuguese Football Players	55	69. Grocery Store - Ana N. defeats Catarina (Ep. 7 FD7. International Hits - Ana N. defeats Magalhães (Ep. 7); 70. Portuguese Football Players - Pedro M. defeats Ana N. (Ep. 8)	2	1	Episode 7	Episode 8
Mário Timóteo	Mário	Communication consultant	Loures	52	**International Public Figures**	21	71. 80s Movie and TV Stars - Magalhães defeats Mário N. (Ep. 8)	1	N/A	N/A	Episode 8
José Galvão	José G.	Medical emergency trainer	Sintra	60	**Radio Announcers and Entertainers**	91	72. Appetizers - Carla R. defeats José G. (Ep. 8)	1	N/A	N/A	Episode 8
Hugo Martins	Hugo M.	Client manager	Massamá	41	**Spices and Condiments**	85	33. Arithmetic Operations - Hugo M. defeats João M (Ep. 4); 73. Spices and Condiments - Carla R. defeats Hugo M. (Ep. 8)	2	N/A	N/A	Episode 8
Carla Ribeiro	Carla R.	Geography teacher	Trás-os-Montes	48	**Portuguese Gastronomy**; Appetizers; Radio Announcers and Entertainers	92	51. Mythological Figures - Carla R. defeats Patrícia (Ep. 6); FD6. Looks and Iconic Visuals - Carla R. defeats Grilo (Ep. 6); 62. Portuguese Gastronomy - Carla R. defeats Rui F. (Ep. 7); 72. Appetizers - Carla R. defeats José G. (Ep. 8); 73. Spices and Condiments - Carla R. defeats Hugo M. (Ep. 8); 74. Human Body - Rita defeats Carla R. (Ep. 8)	5	1	Episode 6	Episode 8
Marco Domingues	Marco D.	Software engineer	Mira	25	**Symbols and Pictograms**	29	46. Famous Duos - Marco D. defeats Miguel R. (Ep. 5); 75. Symbols and Pictograms - Daniel defeats Marco D. (Ep. 8)	2	N/A	N/A	Episode 8
José Roque	José R.	Retired engineer	Matosinhos	61	**Historical Photographs**	36	76. International Public Figures - Magalhães defeats José R. (Ep. 8)	1	N/A	N/A	Episode 8
Paulo Garcia	Paulo G.	Local administration technician	Pinhal Novo	49	**Islands and Archipelagos**; Bands	59	40. Junk Drawer - Paulo G. defeats Waldir (Ep. 5); 66. Islands and Archipelagos - Paulo G. defeats César (Ep. 7); 77. Bands - Fernando defeats Paulo G. (Ep. 8)	3	N/A	N/A	Episode 8
João Pedro Rodrigues	João R.	Retired banker	Fundão	59	**World Capitals**	89	59. Iconic Buildings and Constructions - João R. defeats Isabel (Ep. 6); 78. World Capitals - Mª João defeats João R. (Ep. 8)	2	N/A	N/A	Episode 8
António Magalhães	Magalhães	Casino bankroll payer	TBA	49	**Aquatic Animals**; Bakery and Pastry; Rappers; Birds; 80s Movie and TV Stars; International Public Figures; Historical Photographs	2	12. Aquatic Animals - Magalhães defeats Iolanda (Ep. 2); 52. Bakery and Pastry - Magalhães defeats Guilherme (Ep. 6); 57. Rappers - Magalhães defeats Marco V. (Ep. 6); 65. Birds - Magalhães defeats Ricardo P. (Ep. 7); FD7. International Hits - Ana N. defeats Magalhães (Ep. 7); 71. 80s Movie and TV Stars - Magalhães defeats Mário N. (Ep. 8); 76. International Public Figures - Magalhães defeats José R. (Ep. 8); 79. Historical Photographs - Nuno C. defeats Magalhães (Ep. 8)	7	1	N/A	Episode 8
Nuno Coelho	Nuno C.	Mechanical engineer	Oliveira de Azeméis	31	**Tech and Gaming**	47	79. Historical Photographs - Nuno C. defeats Magalhães (Ep. 8); FD8. Models - Nuno C. defeats Rita (Ep. 8); 80. Space and Astronomy - Ivo defeats Nuno C. (Ep. 9)	2	1	Episode 8	Episode 9
André Cardoso	André	Entrepreneur	TBA	39	**Cycling**	28	81. Spanish - Daniel defeats André (Ep. 9)	1	N/A	N/A	Episode 9
Natérica Simões	Natércia	RH manager	Estoril	47	**Basketball Players**	95	82. Radio Announcers and Entertainers - Rita defeats Natérica (Ep. 9)	1	N/A	N/A	Episode 9
Paula Micaela	Paula M.	Social entertainer	Fronteira	44	**Flowers**	50	83. International Dishes - Afonso F. defeats Paula M. (Ep. 9)	1	N/A	N/A	Episode 9
Francisco Ferreira	Francisco	Graduate student	Oeiras	22	**International Female Singers**	26	13. Foreign Topography - Francisco defeats Miguel F. (Ep. 2); 84. International Female Singers - Maria defeats Francisco (Ep. 9)	2	N/A	N/A	Episode 9
Margarida Monteiro	Margarida	Administrative	Matosinhos	55	**Dog Breeds**	86	85. Tools and DIY - Pedro M. defeats Margarida (Ep. 9)	1	N/A	N/A	Episode 9
Eva Nobre	Eva	Nurse	Coimbra	24	**Lab Material**	69	86. Dog Breeds - Pedro M. defeats Eva (Ep. 9)	1	N/A	N/A	Episode 9
Mariana Dias	Mariana	IT team manager	Trofa	29	**Actresses**	30	87. 80's Music - Fernando defeats Mariana (Ep. 9)	1	N/A	N/A	Episode 9
Daniel Conde	Daniel	Business analyst	Rio de Janeiro	40	**Spanish**; Cycling	20	75. Symbols and Pictograms - Daniel defeats Marco D. (Ep. 8); 81. Spanish - Daniel defeats André (Ep. 9); 88. Cycling - Fernando defeats Daniel (Ep. 9)	3	N/A	N/A	Episode 9
Fernando Leite	Fernando	Export commercial	Santo Tirso	47	**80's Music**; Actresses	58	77. Bands - Fernando defeats Paulo G. (Ep. 8); 87. 80's Music - Fernando defeats Mariana (Ep. 9); 88. Cycling - Fernando defeats Daniel (Ep. 9); 89. Tennis Players - Afonso A. defeats Fernando (Ep. 9)	4	N/A	N/A	Episode 9
Afonso Ascensão	Afonso A.	College student	Évora	26	**Tennis Players**; Actresses	10	32. Clothes and Accessories - Afonso A. defeats Pedro G. (Ep. 4); 89. Tennis Players - Afonso A. defeats Fernando (Ep. 9); 90. Lab Material - Pedro M. defeats Afonso A. (Ep. 10)	3	N/A	N/A	Episode 10
Maria Alves	Maria A.	College student	TBA	19	**Periodic Table**	34	84. International Female Singers - Maria defeats Francisco (Ep. 9); 91. Flowers - Afonso F. defeats Maria (Ep. 10)	2	N/A	N/A	Episode 10
Duarte Heitor	Duarte	Agricultural engineer	Santarém	47	**Football Stadiums**	6	16. Portuguese Singers - Duarte defeats Sandra A. (Ep. 2); 92. Tech and Gaming - Ivo defeats Duarte (Ep. 10)	2	N/A	N/A	Episode 10
Pedro Magalhães	Pedro M.	Agricultural engineer	Cabeceiras de Basto	38	**Tools and DIY**; Dog Breeds; Lab Material; Actresses	45	70. Portuguese Football Players - Pedro M. defeats Ana N. (Ep. 8); 85. Tools and DIY - Pedro M. defeats Margarida (Ep. 9); 86. Dog Breeds - Pedro M. defeats Eva (Ep. 9); 90. Lab Material - Pedro M. defeats Afonso A. (Ep. 10); 91. Actresses - Afonso F. defeats Pedro M. (Ep. 10)	5	N/A	N/A	Episode 10
Afonso Fonseca	Afonso F.	College student	Sintra	22	**International Dishes**; Flowers; Periodic Table	60	60. Musical Instruments - Afonso F. defeats Rogério (Ep. 7); 83. International Dishes - Afonso F. defeats Paula M. (Ep. 9); 91. Actresses - Afonso F. defeats Pedro M. (Ep. 10); 92. Flowers - Afonso F. defeats Maria (Ep. 10); 94. Periodic Table - Ivo defeats Afonso F. (Ep. 10)	5	N/A	N/A	Episode 10
Rita Nunes	Rita	Dentist	Vendas Novas	32	**Human Body**; Radio Announcers and Entertainers; Basketball Players	63	5. Invetions - Rita defeats Paulo (Ep. 1); 74. Human Body - Rita defeats Carla R. (Ep. 8); FD8. Models - Nuno C. defeats Rita (Ep. 8); 82. Radio Announcers and Entertainers - Rita defeats Natérica (Ep. 9); FD9. Hairstyles and Hats - Rita defeats Ivo (Ep. 9); 95. Basketball Players - Ivo defeats Rita (Ep. 10)	4	2	Episode 9	Episode 10
Afonso Carlos	Afonso C.	College student	TBA	22	**Famous Animals**; Movie Titles	96	48. Famous Animals - Afonso C. defeats Marco G. (Ep. 5); 96. Football Stadiums - Ivo defeats Afonso C. (Ep. 10)	2	N/A	N/A	Episode 10
Ivo Gomes	Ivo	Professional driver	Seixal	37	**Space and Astronomy**; Tech and Gaming; Football Stadiums; Movie Titles	38	1. Notable Figures - Ivo defeats Beirão (Ep. 1); 80. Space and Astronomy - Ivo defeats Nuno C. (Ep. 9); FD9. Hairstyles and Hats - Rita defeats Ivo (Ep. 9); 93. Tech and Gaming - Ivo defeats Duarte (Ep. 10); 94. Periodic Table - Ivo defeats Afonso F. (Ep. 10); 95. Basketball Players - Ivo defeats Rita (Ep. 10); 96. Football Stadiums - Ivo defeats Afonso C. (Ep. 10); 97. Movie Titles - Paulo M. defeats Ivo (Ep. 10)	7	1	N/A	Episode 10
Paulo Martins	Paulo M.	Banker	Porto de Mós	42	**Events and Commemorative Dates**	3	58. Cinema Characters - Paulo M. defeats Rui S. (Ep. 6); 97. Movie Titles - Paulo M. defeats Ivo (Ep. 10); 98. Events and Commemorative Dates - Grilo defeats Paulo M. (Ep. 10)	3	N/A	N/A	3rd Place
Maria João Neto	Mª João	Guide-interpreter	TBA	50	**National Monuments**	100	78. World Capitals - Mª João defeats João R. (Ep. 8); 99. Peoples of the World - Grilo defeats Mª João (Ep. 10)	2	N/A	N/A	2nd Place
João Grilo	Grilo	Civil engineer	Lisbon	36	**International Singers**; Snacks; Black and White Cinema; Peoples of the World	23	38. International Singers - Grilo defeats Carla G. (Ep. 4); 43. Snacks - Grilo defeats Vítor (Ep. 5); FD5. Movie Soundtracks - Grilo defeats Patrícia (Ep. 5); FD6. Looks and Iconic Visuals - Carla R. defeats Grilo (Ep. 6); 61. Black and White Cinema - Grilo defeats Bruno (Ep. 7); 98. Events and Commemorative Dates - Grilo defeats Paulo M. (Ep. 10); 99. Peoples of the World - Grilo defeats Mª João (Ep. 10)	5	2	**Episode 5 &** **Season Winner**	

=== Duels ===
Colour key
Contestant won the Duel
Contestant won 3 Duels in a row and an advantage of 5 seconds to use in a future round at their own choice
Contestant lost the Duel and was eliminated
Contestant won the Final Duel of the episode, winning the prize of €2 500
Contestant lost the Final Duel of the episode, but continued in the game
Contestant ended up losing until the end of the episode, so the total space is no longer updated

==== Week 1: Top 100 (September 14) ====
First episode results
Number of the Duel	Challenger Time	Challenger	Category	Challenged	Challenged Time	Total Space
1	45 s	Ivo	Notable Figures	Beirão	45 s	2
2	45 s	Diogo	Fruits	Alice	45 s	2
3	45 s	Alice	Appliances and Utensils	Luís	45 s	3
4	45 s	Alice	Games and Toys	Sandra	45 s	4
5	45 s	Rita	Inventions	Paulo V.	45 s	2
6	45 s	Fernando L.	Medical Devices	Ilda	45 s	2
7	45 s	Fernando L.	Back to School	Vítor	45 s	3
8	45 s	Bárbara	Mammals	Filipe	45 s	2
9	45 s	H. Matos	TV Shows	Cristina	45 s	2
Final Duel 1 (Note: Although there are no "Challenger" or "Challenged" contestants in the Final Duel, the assumed contestant as "Challenger" was the first to play in the Duel.)	45 s	Sandra	Painters	Vítor	45 s	-

==== Week 2: Top 91 (September 21) ====
Second episode results
Number of the Duel	Challenger Time	Challenger	Category	Challenged	Challenged Time	Total Space
10	45 s	H. Matos	Sports Club Emblems	Nuno P.	45 s	3
11	45 s	Samuel	Oscar Winners	Miguel F.	45 s	2
12	45 s	Iolanda	Aquatic Animals	Magalhães	45 s	2
13	45 s	Francisco	Foreign Topography	Miguel F.	45 s	3
14	45 s	António Q.	Portuguese Writers	Isabel	45 s	2
15	45 s	Fábio	Comedians	H. Matos	45 s	4
16	45 s	Duarte	Portuguese Singers	Sandra A.	45 s	2
17	45 s	Carlos	Transports	Waldir	45 s	2
18	45 s	Cátia	Foreign Football Players	Sérgio	45 s	2
19	45 s	Rúben	Jobs	António F.	45 s	2
Final Duel 2	45 s	Sandra	Beards and Mustaches	Fábio	45 s	-

==== Week 3: Top 81 (September 28) ====
Third episode results
Number of the Duel	Challenger Time	Challenger	Category	Challenged	Challenged Time	Total Space
20	45 s	Zé Carlos	Portuguese Traditions and Habits	Paulo J.	45 s	2
21	45 s	Paulo F.	Plants	Teresa	45 s	2
22	45 s	Paulo F.	Wedding	Vítor	45 s	5
23	45 s	Vítor	Leisure and Free Time	Manuel Q.	45 s	6
24	45 s	Vítor	Flags	Pedro S.	45 s	7
25	45 s	Paula L.	Album Covers	Alexandre	45 s	2
26	45 s	Alexandre	Bank Notes and Coins	João M.	45 s	3
27 (Note: The played category had a limited number of images (football teams that qualified for the final stage of UEFA European Football Championship). Both players managed to reach the end of the set of images. Therefore, the player with less time remaining was eliminated. João M. had 19 s left and Rodrigo had 2 s left. Rodrigo was eliminated.)	45 s	João M.	Football Equipments	Rodrigo	45 s	4
28	45 s	Rose	International Film-Makers	Sandra	45 s	5
29	45 s	David	Sports and Modalities	Paulo J.	45 s	3
Final Duel 3	45 s	Sandra	Types of Shoes	Vítor	45 s	-

==== Week 4: Top 71 (October 5) ====
Fourth episode results
Number of the Duel	Challenger Time	Challenger	Category	Challenged	Challenged Time	Total Space
30	45 s	David	Babies and Children	Carla T.	45 s	4
31	45 s	Carla T.	Interior Decoration	António F.	45 s	6
32	45 s	Afonso A.	Clothes and Accessories	Pedro G.	45 s	2
33	45 s	Hugo M.	Arithmetic Operations	João M.	45 s	5
34	45 s	P. Miguel	Sports Equipment	Marco M.	45 s	2
35	45 s	Marco M.	World Tourist Attractions	Rui Ferro	45 s	3
36	45 s	Marco M.	20th Century Politicians	Luis A.	45 s	4
37	50 s	Marco M.	Portuguese Politicians	Bárbara	45 s	6
38	45 s	Carla G.	International Singers	Grilo	45 s	2
39	45 s	Mª de Jesus	Religion	Marco M.	45 s	7
Final Duel 4	45 s	Mª de Jesus	TV Series Openings	Vítor	45 s	-

==== Week 5: Top 61 (October 12) ====
Fifth episode results
Number of the Duel	Challenger Time	Challenger	Category	Challenged	Challenged Time	Total Space
40	45 s	Paulo G.	Junk Drawer	Waldir	45 s	3
41	45 s	Ana B.	Famous Couples	Fábio	45 s	5
42	45 s	José P.	World Works of Art	Vítor	50 s	8
43	45 s	Vítor	Snacks	Grilo	45 s	10
44	45 s	Tiago	World Leaders	Mª de Jesus	45 s	8
45	45 s	Mª de Jesus	Festival da Canção	Patrícia	45 s	9
46	45 s	Marco D.	Famous Duos	Miguel R.	45 s	2
47	45 s	Manuel V.	English	Patrícia	45 s	10
48	45 s	Marco G.	Famous Animals	Afonso C.	45 s	2
49	45 s	Catarina	Royalty Members	Fábio	45 s	6
Final Duel 5	45 s	Grilo	Movie Soundtracks	Patrícia	45 s	-

==== Week 6: Top 51 (October 19) ====
Sixth episode results
Number of the Duel	Challenger Time	Challenger	Category	Challenged	Challenged Time	Total Space
50	45 s	Jorge	Bugs and Crawlies	Carla T.	45 s	7
51	45 s	Carla R.	Mythological Figures	Patrícia	45 s	11
52	45 s	Guilherme	Bakery and Pastry	Magalhães	45 s	3
53	45 s	Ricardo S.	Car Mechanics	Jorge	45 s	8
54	45 s	Nuno S.	Veggies	Sérgio	45 s	3
55	45 s	Nuno S.	Footbal Coaches	Marco V.	45 s	4
56	45 s	Marco V.	Beach	Vicente	45 s	5
57	45 s	Marco V.	Rappers	Magalhães	45 s	8
58	45 s	Paulo M.	Cinema Characters	Rui S.	45 s	2
59	45 s	João R.	Iconic Buildings and Constructions	Isabel	45 s	3
Final Duel 6	45 s	Carla R.	Looks and Iconic Visuals	Grilo	45 s	-

==== Week 7: Top 41 (October 26) ====
Seventh episode results
Number of the Duel	Challenger Time	Challenger	Category	Challenged	Challenged Time	Total Space
60	45 s	Afonso F.	Musical Instruments	Rogério	45 s	2
61	45 s	Bruno	Black and White Cinema	Grilo	45 s	11
62	45 s	Rui F.	Portuguese Gastronomy	Carla R.	45 s	12
63	45 s	Luísa	Desserts and Sweets	Ricardo P.	45 s	2
64	45 s	Ricardo P.	Brazilian Music	Sandra	45 s	7
65	45 s	Ricardo P.	Birds	Magalhães	45 s	15
66	45 s	César	Islands and Archipelagos	Paulo G.	45 s	4
67	45 s	Hugo S.	Portuguese Olympic Athletes	Ricardo S.	45 s	9
68	45 s	Ricardo S.	Popular Portuguese Music	Catarina	45 s	15
69	45 s	Catarina	Grocery Store	Ana N.	45 s	16
Final Duel 7	45 s	Ana N.	International Hits	Magalhães	45 s	-

==== Week 8: Top 31 (November 2) ====
Eight episode results
Number of the Duel	Challenger Time	Challenger	Category	Challenged	Challenged Time	Total Space
70	45 s	Pedro M.	Portuguese Football Players	Ana N.	45 s	17
71	45 s	Mário	International Public Figures	Magalhães	45 s	16
72 (Note: At this point in the game, after José G. was randomly selected to play, Carla R. was the only player he could select, as there were no other players in contiguous spaces to his territory.)	45 s	José G.	Appetizers	Carla R.	45 s	13
73	45 s	Carla R.	Spices and Condiments	Hugo M.	45 s	18
74	45 s	Carla R.	Human Body	Rita	45 s	20
75	45 s	Daniel	Symbols and Pictograms	Marco D.	45 s	3
76	45 s	José R.	International Public Figures	Magalhães	45 s	17
77	45 s	Fernando	Bands	Paulo G.	45 s	5
78	45 s	Mª João	World Capitals	João R.	45 s	4
79	45 s	Nuno C.	Historical Photographs	Magalhães	45 s	18
Final Duel 8	45 s	Rita	Models	Nuno C.	45 s	-

==== Week 9: Top 21 (November 9) ====
Ninth episode results
Number of the Duel	Challenger Time	Challenger	Category	Challenged	Challenged Time	Total Space
80	45 s	Nuno C.	Space and Astronomy	Ivo	45 s	20
81	45 s	André	Spanish	Daniel	45 s	4
82	45 s	Natércia	Radio Announcers and Entertainers	Rita	45 s	21
83	45 s	Paula M.	International Dishes	Afonso F.	45 s	3
84	45 s	Maria A.	International Female Singers	Francisco	45 s	4
85	45 s	Margarida	Tools and DIY	Pedro M.	45 s	18
86	45 s	Eva	Dog Breeds	Pedro M.	45 s	19
87 (Note: Mariana was the last contestant with a one-sized territory. Therefore, she was selected by default to play. From that point on, all the remaining players became eligible for the randomizer.)	45 s	Mariana	80's Music	Fernando	45 s	6
88	45 s	Fernando	Cycling	Daniel	45 s	10
89	45 s	Fernando	Tennis Players	Afonso A.	45 s	12
Final Duel 9	45 s	Rita	Hairstyles and Hats	Ivo	45 s	-

==== Week 10: Finale (November 16) ====
Tenth episode results
Number of the Duel	Challenger Time	Challenger	Category	Challenged	Challenged Time	Total Space
90	45 s	Afonso A.	Lab Material	Pedro M.	45 s	31
91 (Note: After being randomly selected to play, Afonso F. had no choice but to challenge Pedro M., as there were no other players in contiguous spaces to his territory.)	45 s	Afonso F.	Actresses	Pedro M.	45 s	34
92	45 s	Maria A.	Flowers	Afonso F.	45 s	38
93	45 s	Duarte	Tech and Gaming	Ivo	45 s	22
94	45 s	Ivo	Periodic Table	Afonso F.	45 s	60
95	45 s	Ivo	Basketball Players	Rita	45 s	81
96	45 s	Afonso C.	Football Stadiums	Ivo	50 s	83
97 (Note: After being randomly selected to play, Paulo M. had no choice but to challenge Ivo, as there were no other players in contiguous spaces to his territory.)	45 s	Paulo M.	Movie Titles	Ivo	45 s	85
98 (Note: After being randomly selected to play, Grilo had no choice but to challenge Paulo M., as there were no other players in contiguous spaces to his territory.)	45 s	Grilo	Events and Commemorative Dates	Paulo M.	45 s	96
99 (Note: For the last duel, Grilo had no choice but to challenge Mª João since they were the only players left.) (Note: As the player with the most space on the board, for the final duel, Grilo could choose to play Peoples of the World (his category) or National Monuments (the category defended by Mª João). He decided to play Peoples of the World.)	45 s	Grilo	Peoples of the World	Mª João	45 s	100

=== Stats & Fun Facts ===
Concerning the first season:

- Maria was the youngest player of the season at 19 years old, while Ilda was the oldest at 72.
- The most common category among players was Actresses, held by four contestants at different times during the season: Mariana, Fernando, Afonso A., and Pedro M.
- Ivo and Magalhães played the most duels during the season, with 7 each.
- Vítor and Sandra played the most Final Duels (3 each); Sandra won 2, and Vítor won 1.
- Magalhães held the most categories throughout the game, with a total of 7: Aquatic Animals, Bakery and Pastry, Rappers, Birds, 80s Movie and TV Stars, International Public Figures, and Historical Photographs.
- Vítor, Marco M., and Ivo were the only players to win three duels in a row, earning 5 extra seconds to use in a duel of their choice. All three used their extra time and won the respective duels.
- Alice, Marco V., Ricardo P., Carla R., and Fernando also attempted to earn the extra 5 seconds by winning three consecutive duels, but lost in the third duel.
- Since Grilo chose the category Peoples of the World to play in the last duel, National Monuments was the only category not played during the season.
- Out of 99 duels, 42 were won by the challengers (42.42%), while 57 were won by the challenged players (57.58%).
- Magalhães was the most frequently challenged player, being chosen in all 7 of his duels.
- Vítor, Ivo, Marco M., and Carla R. were the most frequent challengers, each initiating duels 3 times.
- Mariana was the last player to make her debut, first playing in Episode 9 (Duel 87).
- Ivo had the longest gap between duels: he played in the season's first duel and then not again until Duel 80 in Episode 9, making a span of 78 duels without playing.

== Season 2 ==
=== Contestants ===
The categories in bold represent the original theme of expertise of each contestant.

Results (Season 2)
Name	Nickname	Job	Hometown	Age	Category	Space Assignment	Duels	Duels Played	Final Duels Played	Episodes Won	Exited
Ana Reis	Ana R.	Aerospatial engineer	TBA	25	**Cosmos**	95	1. Portuguese Public Figures - Gonçalo defeats Ana R. (Ep. 1)	1	N/A	N/A	Episode 1
Rui Brito Lança	Rui L.	Touristic guide	Castro Verde	50	**Fruit Trees**	43	2. Iconic Buildings and Constructions - João V. defeats Rui L. (Ep. 1)	1	N/A	N/A	Episode 1
Alexandre Rocha	Alexandre	Property manager	TBA	50	**Sports Films**	57	3. Sports Films - Ricardo defeats Alexandre (Ep. 1)	1	N/A	N/A	Episode 1
Ricardo Alves	Ricardo	Programmer	Feijó	41	**Chefs**	58	3. Sports Films - Ricardo defeats Alexandre (Ep. 1); 4. Music Legends - J. Pedro defeats Ricardo (Ep. 1)	2	N/A	N/A	Episode 1
João Pedro Silva	J. Pedro	Front-office	Vila Nova de Gaia	42	**Music Legends**; Chefs	47	4. Music Legends - J. Pedro defeats Ricardo (Ep. 1); 5. Stationery - Cláudia defeats J. Pedro (Ep. 1)	2	N/A	N/A	Episode 1
Paulo Andrade	Andrade	Retired military	Azores	53	**Civil Construction**	24	6. Portuguese Sweets - Andreia defeats Andrade (Ep. 1)	1	N/A	N/A	Episode 1
Andreia Fernandes	Andreia	HR technician	Mangualde	32	**Portuguese Sweets**; Civil Construction	14	6. Portuguese Sweets - Andreia defeats Andrade (Ep. 1); 7. Olympics - Sebastião defeats Andreia (Ep. 1)	2	N/A	N/A	Episode 1
Marco Silva	Marco S.	Postman	Faial Island	37	**Flags**	70	8. Flags - Paquete. defeats Marco S. (Ep. 1)	1	N/A	N/A	Episode 1
Sónia Almeida	Sónia	Manager	TBA	43	**Wild Animals**	41	9. Wild Animals - Celestino defeats Sónia (Ep. 1)	1	N/A	N/A	Episode 1
Bruno Pereira	Bruno P.	Entrepreneur	TBA	49	**World Natural Landscapes**	27	10. World Natural Landscapes - Eduardo W. defeats Bruno P. (Ep. 2)	1	N/A	N/A	Episode 2
Hélio Pinho	Hélio	Geography teacher	TBA	43	**Eurovision Winning Countries**	52	11. Eurovision Winning Countries - Sofia M. defeats Hélio (Ep. 2)	1	N/A	N/A	Episode 2
Diogo Pestana	Pestana	College student	Madeira	25	**Midnight Snacks**	53	12. Midnight Snacks - Sofia M. defeats Pestana (Ep. 2)	1	N/A	N/A	Episode 2
Lídia Amorim	Lídia	Marketing director	Espinho	36	**Technology**	54	13. Technology - Sofia M. defeats Lídia (Ep. 2)	1	N/A	N/A	Episode 2
João Pereira	J. Pereira	Consultant	TBA	26	**Portuguese Geography**	90	14. Hotel Breakfast - Carolina defeats J. Pereira (Ep. 2)	1	N/A	N/A	Episode 2
Carolina Gomes	Carolina	IT consultant	Cacém	28	**Hotel Breakfast**; Portuguese Geography	100	14. Hotel Breakfast - Carolina defeats J. Pereira (Ep. 2); 15. Spices and Condiments - Carla S. defeats Carolina (Ep. 2)	2	N/A	N/A	Episode 2
Carla Soares	Carla S.	Team manager	Braga	53	**Spices and Condiments**; Portuguese Geography	80	15. Spices and Condiments - Carla S. defeats Carolina (Ep. 2); 16. Agriculture - Paquete defeats Carla S. (Ep. 2)	2	N/A	N/A	Episode 2
Artur Almeida	Artur	HR Director	TBA	42	**Religion**	66	17. World Capitals - Ivan defeats Artur (Ep. 2)	1	N/A	N/A	Episode 2
Sebastião Almeida	Sebastião	Software engineer	Sintra	28	**Olympics**; Civil Construction	13	7. Olympics - Sebastião defeats Andreia (Ep. 1); FD1. Festival da Canção Winners - Sebastião defeats Cláudia R. (Ep. 1); 18. Civil Construction - Barbosa defeats Sebastião (Ep. 2)	2	1	Episode 1	Episode 2
João Pedro Martins	João	Aeronautical engineer	Lisbon	50	**Musicians and Instruments**	4	19. Musicians and Instruments - Barbosa defeats João (Ep. 2)	1	N/A	N/A	Episode 2
Pedro Leite	Pedro L.	Entrepreneur	Cascais	49	**Collectibles and Antiques**	8	20. International Public Figures - Calão defeats Pedro L. (Ep. 3)	1	N/A	N/A	Episode 3
Carlos Filipe	Carlos F.	Domestic animals photographer	TBA	43	**Horror Movies**	82	21. National Monuments - Alexandre F. defeats Carlos F. (Ep. 3)	1	N/A	N/A	Episode 3
Ivan Martinho	Ivan	Cardiopulmonary technician	Amadora	25	**World Capitals**; Religion	76	17. World Capitals - Ivan defeats Artur (Ep. 2); 22. Religion - Frederico defeats Ivan (Ep. 3)	2	N/A	N/A	Episode 3
Filipa Teixeira	Filipa	PE teacher	TBA	36	**Sports**	86	23. Sports - Frederico defeats Filipa (Ep. 3)	1	N/A	N/A	Episode 3
Frederico Melim	Frederico	Airports operation manager	TBA	40	**Athletes**	75	22. Religion - Frederico defeats Ivan (Ep. 3); 23. Sports - Frederico defeats Filipa (Ep. 3); 24. Cosmos - Gonçalo M. defeats Frederico (Ep. 3)	3	N/A	N/A	Episode 3
Luís Monginho	Luís M.	Bank clerk	Reguengos de Monsaraz	53	**Camping**	15	25. Spanish Languagae - Hugo G. defeats Luís M. (Ep. 3)	1	N/A	N/A	Episode 3
Rui Barbosa	Barbosa	Entrepreneur	Algés	47	**Hobbies and Entertainment**	3	18. Civil Construction - Barbosa defeats Sebastião (Ep. 2); 19. Musicians and Instruments - Barbosa defeats João (Ep. 2); FD2. Fashion Icons - Paquete defeats Barbosa (Ep. 2); 26. Hobbies and Entertainment - Hugo G. defeats Barbosa (Ep. 3)	3	1	N/A	Episode 3
Inês Taquelim	Inês	Personal assistant	TBA	38	**Dog Breeds**	69	27. Dog Breeds - Francisco B. defeats Inês (Ep. 3)	1	N/A	N/A	Episode 3
Pedro Caballero Y Serodio	Pedro C.	Real estate agent	Lisbon	52	**Universe of Fantasy**	59	28. Universe of Fantasy - Francisco B. defeats Pedro C. (Ep. 3)	1	N/A	N/A	Episode 3
Augusto Pinto	Augusto	Production manager	Famalicão (Guarda)	56	**Portuguese Towns and Villages**	40	29. Formula 1 - Mariana defeats Augusto (Ep. 3)	1	N/A	N/A	Episode 3
Hugo Guerreiro	Hugo	Professor, actor and musician	Vendas Novas	28	**Spanish**; Camping	5	25. Spanish Languagae - Hugo defeats Luís M. (Ep. 3); 26. Hobbies and Entertainment - Hugo defeats Barbosa (Ep. 3); FD3. Portuguese Handicrafts and Ethnography - Gonçalo M. defeats Hugo (Ep. 3)	2	1	TBA	TBA
António Calão	Calão	Technical assistant	Chelas, Lisboa	46	**International Public Figures**; Collectibles and Antiques	7	20. International Public Figures - Calão defeats Pedro L. (Ep. 3)	1	TBA	TBA	TBA
Eduardo Wengorovius	Eduardo W.	Entrepreneur	Porto	45	**Famous Detectives and Spies**	17	10. World Natural Landscapes - Eduardo W. defeats Bruno P. (Ep. 2)	1	TBA	TBA	TBA
Celestino Vasques	Celestino	Elementary school teacher	Reguengos de Monsaraz	56	**Flowers**	31	9. Wild Animals - Celestino defeats Sónia (Ep. 1)	1	TBA	TBA	TBA
João Pedro Veiga	João V.	Marketing technician	TBA	35	**Iconic Buildings and Constructions**; Fruit Trees	44	2. Iconic Buildings and Constructions - João V. defeats Rui L. (Ep. 1)	1	TBA	TBA	TBA
Cláudia Ramos	Cláudia R.	Kindergarten teacher	Seixal	50	**Stationery**; Chefs	48	5. Stationery - Cláudia defeats J. Pedro (Ep. 1); FD1. Festival da Canção Winners - Sebastião defeats Cláudia R. (Ep. 1)	1	1	TBA	TBA
Mariana Moreira	Mariana	Medical doctor	Penafiel	24	**Formula 1** Portuguese Towns and Villages	50	29. Formula 1 - Mariana defeats Augusto (Ep. 3)	1	TBA	TBA	TBA
Eduardo Paquete	Paquete	Factory coordinator	Algés	59	**Agriculture**; Portuguese Geography	60	8. Flags - Paquete. defeats Marco S. (Ep. 1); 16. Agriculture - Paquete defeats Carla S. (Ep. 2); FD2. Fashion Icons - Paquete defeats Barbosa (Ep. 2)	2	1	Episode 2	TBA
Sofia Maia	Sofia M.	Accounting technician	Ermesinde	26	**Bands**	62	11. Eurovision Winning Countries - Sofia M. defeats Hélio (Ep. 2); 12. Midnight Snacks - Sofia M. defeats Pestana (Ep. 2); 13. Technology - Sofia M. defeats Lídia (Ep. 2)	3	TBA	TBA	TBA
Alexandre Ferreira	Alexandre F.	Travel agent	Albergaria-a-Velha	32	**National Monuments**; Horror Movies	72	21. National Monuments - Alexandre F. defeats Carlos F. (Ep. 3)	1	TBA	TBA	TBA
Francisco Baldé	Francisco B.	College student	TBA	21	**Science Fiction**	79	27. Dog Breeds - Francisco B. defeats Inês (Ep. 3); 28. Universe of Fantasy - Francisco B. defeats Pedro C. (Ep. 3)	2	TBA	TBA	TBA
Gonçalo Moreira	Gonçalo M.	Lifeguard	Turquel	20	**Portuguese Public Figures**; Cosmos; Athletes	96	1. Portuguese Public Figures - Gonçalo defeats Ana R. (Ep. 1); 24. Cosmos - Gonçalo M. defeats Frederico (Ep. 3); FD3. Portuguese Handicrafts and Ethnography - Gonçalo M. defeats Hugo G. (Ep. 3)	2	1	Episode 3	TBA

=== Duels ===
Colour key
Contestant won the Duel
Contestant won 3 Duels in a row and an advantage of 5 seconds to use in a future round at their own choice
Contestant lost the Duel and was eliminated
Contestant won the Final Duel of the episode, winning the prize of €2 500
Contestant lost the Final Duel of the episode, but continued in the game
Contestant ended up losing until the end of the episode, so the total space is no longer updated

==== Week 1: Top 100 (August 2) ====
First episode results
Number of the Duel	Challenger Time	Challenger	Category	Challenged	Challenged Time	Total Space
1	45 s	Ana R.	Portuguese Public Figures	Gonçalo M.	45 s	2
2	45 s	Rui L.	Iconic Buildings and Constructions	João V.	45 s	2
3	45 s	Ricardo	Sport Films	Alexandre	45 s	2
4	45 s	Ricardo	Music Legends	J. Pedro	45 s	3
5	45 s	J. Pedro	Stationery	Cláudia R.	45 s	4
6	45 s	Andrade	Portuguese Sweets	Andreia	45 s	2
7	45 s	Andreia	Olympics	Sebastião	45 s	3
8	45 s	Paquete	Flags	Marco S.	45 s	2
9	45 s	Celestino	Wild Animals	Sónia	45 s	2
Final Duel 1	45 s	Sebastião	Festival da Canção Winners	Cláudia R.	45 s	-

==== Week 2: Top 91 (August 9) ====
Second episode results
Number of the Duel	Challenger Time	Challenger	Category	Challenged	Challenged Time	Total Space
10	45 s	Eduardo W.	World Natural Landscapes	Bruno P.	45 s	2
11	45 s	Sofia M.	Eurovision Winning Countries	Hélio	45 s	2
12	45 s	Sofia M.	Midnight Snacks	Pestana	45 s	3
13	45 s	Sofia M.	Technology	Lídia	45 s	4
14	45 s	J. Pereira	Hotel Breakfast	Carolina	45 s	2
15	45 s	Carolina	Spices and Condiments	Carla S.	45 s	3
16	45 s	Carla S.	Agriculture	Paquete	45 s	5
17	45 s	Artur	World Capitals	Ivan	45 s	2
18	45 s	Barbosa	Civil Construction	Sebastião	45 s	4
19	45 s	Barbosa	Musicians and Instruments	João	45 s	5
Final Duel 2	45 s	Barbosa	Fashion icons	Paquete	45 s	-

==== Week 3: Top 81 (August 16) ====
Third episode results
Number of the Duel	Challenger Time	Challenger	Category	Challenged	Challenged Time	Total Space
20	45 s	Pedro L.	International Public Figures	Calão	45 s	2
21	45 s	Carlos F.	National Momunents	Alexandre F.	45 s	2
22	45 s	Frederico	Religion	Ivan	45 s	3
23	45 s	Frederico	Sports	Filipa	45 s	4
24	45 s	Frederico	Cosmos	Gonçalo M.	45 s	6
25	45 s	Luís M.	Spanish	Hugo	45 s	2
26	45 s	Hugo	Hobbies and Entertainment	Barbosa	45 s	7
27	45 s	Francisco B.	Dog Breeds	Inês	45 s	2
28	45 s	Francisco B.	Universe of Fantasy	Pedro C.	45 s	3
29	45 s	Augusto	Formula 1	Mariana	45 s	2
Final Duel 3	45 s	Gonçalo M.	Portuguese Handicrafts and Ethnography	Hugo	45 s	-

==== Week 4: Top 71 (August 23) ====
Fourth episode results
Number of the Duel	Challenger Time	Challenger	Category	Challenged	Challenged Time	Total Space
30	TBA	TBA	TBA	TBA	TBA	TBA
31	TBA	TBA	TBA	TBA	TBA	TBA
32	TBA	TBA	TBA	TBA	TBA	TBA
33	TBA	TBA	TBA	TBA	TBA	TBA
34	TBA	TBA	TBA	TBA	TBA	TBA
35	TBA	TBA	TBA	TBA	TBA	TBA
36	TBA	TBA	TBA	TBA	TBA	TBA
37	TBA	TBA	TBA	TBA	TBA	TBA
38	TBA	TBA	TBA	TBA	TBA	TBA
39	TBA	TBA	TBA	TBA	TBA	TBA
Final Duel 4	TBA	TBA	TBA	TBA	TBA	-

== Season 3 ==
=== Contestants ===
The categories in bold represent the original theme of expertise of each contestant.

Results (Season 3)
Name	Nickname	Job	Hometown	Age	Category	Space Assignment	Duels	Duels Played	Final Duels Played	Episodes Won	Exited
Jorge Carrondo	Jorge	Business manager	Seixal	47	**In the Trunk**	33	1. Professions – Patrícia defeats Jorge (Ep. 1)	1	N/A	N/A	Episode 1
Diogo Silva	Diogo	Software Engineer	Carregado	24	**Basketball Players**	30	2. Basketball Players – João Pedro defeats Diogo (Ep. 1)	1	N/A	N/A	Episode 1
Ana Filipa Duarte	Filipa D.	Clinical Analysis Technician	Vila Nova de Gaia	38	**Pets**	29	3. Pets – João Pedro defeats Filipa D. (Ep. 1)	1	N/A	N/A	Episode 1
João Marques	Marques	University Student	Coimbra	22	**Wardrobe**	64	4. Wardrobe – Sara defeats Marques (Ep. 1)	1	N/A	N/A	Episode 1
Hélio Góes	Hélio	Manager	São Paulo??	45	**Brazilian Culture**	84	5. Supermarket – Marianna defeats Hélio (Ep. 1)	1	N/A	N/A	Episode 1
Bruno Barros	Bruno	Police	Santa Maria da Feira	37	**Dog Breeds**	57	6. Club Symbols – Henrique defeats Bruno (Ep. 1)	1	N/A	N/A	Episode 1
Virgínia Bolado	Virgínia	Public Worker	Angola??	66	**Winter**	77	7. Winter – Henrique defeats Virgínia (Ep. 1)	1	N/A	N/A	Episode 1
Henrique Abreu	Henrique	Senior Safety Technician	TBA	45	**Club Symbols**; Dog Breeds	67	6. Club Symbols – Henrique defeats Bruno (Ep. 1); 7. Winter – Henrique defeats Virgínia (Ep. 1); 8. On the Esplanade – Paula defeats Henrique (Ep. 1)	3	N/A	N/A	Episode 1
Ana Paula Raposo	Paula	Human Resources Administrator	Reboleira	55	**On the Esplanade**; Dog Breeds	47	8. On the Esplanade – Paula defeats Henrique (Ep. 1); 9. Babies and Kids – Raquel defeats Ana (Ep. 1)	2	N/A	N/A	Episode 1
André Lima	André	Supermarket Operator	Aveiro	37	**Snacks Outside of Hours**	66	10. Dog Breeds – Raquel defeats André (Ep. 2)	1	N/A	N/A	Episode 2
Pedro Figueiredo	Pedro M.	University Student	TBA	20	**Cosplay**	31	11. Modalities – Ana defeats Pedro M. (Ep. 2)	1	N/A	N/A	Episode 2
Patrícia Tavares	Patrícia	Jurist	Alverca do Ribatejo	36	**Professions**; In the Trunk	32	1. Professions – Patrícia defeats Jorge (Ep. 1)	1	TBA	TBA	TBA
João Pedro Ferreira	João Pedro	Biologist	Lisbon??	27	**Mammals**	40	2. Basketball Players – João Pedro defeats Diogo (Ep. 1); 3. Pets – João Pedro defeats Filipa D. (Ep. 1); FD1. Anagrams – Raquel defeats João Pedro (Ep. 1)	2	1	TBA	TBA
Sara Gamboa	Sara	Mechanical Engineer	Ribeira Grande	37	**Foreign Singers**	65	4. Wardrobe – Sara defeats Marques (Ep. 1)	1	TBA	TBA	TBA
Marianna Gomes	Marianna	Executive Assitant	Porto Salvo	35	**Supermarket**; Brazilian Culture	74	5. Supermarket – Marianna defeats Hélio (Ep. 1)	1	TBA	TBA	TBA
Raquel Pereira	Raquel	Nurse	Samora Correia	32	**Babies and Kids**; Dog Breeds; Snacks Outside of Hours	56	9. Babies and Kids – Raquel defeats Ana (Ep. 1); FD1. Anagrams – Raquel defeats João Pedro (Ep. 1); 10. Dog Breeds – Raquel defeats André (Ep. 2)	2	1	Episode 1	TBA
Ana Junqueiro	Ana	Physical Education Teacher	Oeiras??	44	**Modalities**; Cosplay	21	11. Modalities – Ana defeats Pedro M. (Ep. 2)	1	TBA	TBA	TBA

=== Duels ===
Colour key
Contestant won the Duel
Contestant won 3 Duels in a row and an advantage of 5 seconds to use in a future round at their own choice
Contestant lost the Duel and was eliminated
Contestant won the Final Duel of the episode, winning the prize of €2 500
Contestant lost the Final Duel of the episode, but continued in the game
Contestant ended up losing until the end of the episode, so the total space is no longer updated

==== Week 1: Top 100 (August 22) ====
First episode results
Number of the Duel	Challenger Time	Challenger	Category	Challenged	Challenged Time	Total Space
1	45 s	Jorge	Professions	Patrícia	45 s	2
2	45 s	João Pedro	Basketball Players	Diogo	45 s	2
3	45 s	João Pedro	Pets	Filipa D.	45 s	3
4	45 s	Sara	Wardrobe	Marques	45 s	2
5	45 s	Hélio	Supermarket	Marianna	45 s	2
6	45 s	Bruno	Club Symbols	Henrique	45 s	2
7	45 s	Henrique	Winter	Virgínia	45 s	3
8	45 s	Henrique	Mammals	Paula	45 s	4
9	45 s	Paula	Babies and Kids	Raquel	45 s	5
Final Duel 1 (Note: Although there are no "Challenger" or "Challenged" contestants in the Final Duel, the assumed contestant as "Challenger" was the first to play in the Duel.)	45 s	João Pedro	Anagrams	Raquel	45 s	-

==== Week 1: Top 91 (August 29) ====
Second episode results
Number of the Duel	Challenger Time	Challenger	Category	Challenged	Challenged Time	Total Space
1	45 s	André	Dog Breeds	Raquel	45 s	6
2	45 s	Pedro M.	Modalities	Ana	45 s	2
3	45 s		Pets		45 s	
4	45 s		Wardrobe		45 s	
5	45 s		Supermarket		45 s	
6	45 s		Club Symbols		45 s	
7	45 s		Winter		45 s	
8	45 s		Mammals		45 s	
9	45 s		Babies and Kids		45 s	
Final Duel 1	45 s	João Pedro	Anagrams	Raquel	45 s	-

== Reception ==
Season	Episode	Name of the Episode	Viewers	Rating	Share
1	1	Episode 1	602 500	6.2%	14.2%
1	2	Episode 2	572 700	5.9%	13.2%
1	3	Episode 3	TBA	TBA	TBA
1	4	Episode 4	TBA	TBA	TBA
1	5	Episode 5	592 600	6.1%	14.1%
1	6	Episode 6	TBA	TBA	TBA
1	7	Episode 7	446 600	4.6%	10.3%
1	8	Episode 8	TBA	TBA	TBA
1	9	Episode 9	355 600	3.7%	9.2%
1	10	Episode 10	439 900	4.6%	11.5%
2	1	Episode 1	518 400	5.4%	13.1%
2	2	Episode 2	466 900	4.8 %	12.5 %
2	3	Episode 3	TBA	TBA	TBA
2	4	Episode 4	TBA	TBA	TBA
