= O Diário de Alice =

Animated preschoolers' television series

- Also known as: Alice's Diary
- Portuguese: O diário de Alice
- Spanish: El diario de Alice
- Genre: Animation; Preschoolers
- Created by: Diogo Viegas
- Countries of origin: Portugal; Brazil; Spain
- Original language: Portuguese
- No. of seasons: 1
- No. of episodes: 52

Production
- Production companies: Rádio e Televisão de Portugal; Radiotelevisión Española; Sardinha em Lata; Alice A.I.E.; HAMPA; Gepetto Films; Lightbox; Parrocha Studio

Original release
- Network: RTP2
- Release: 25 March 2024 – present
- Network: Clan
- Release: 25 March 2024 – present

Alice's Diary (Portuguese: O diário de Alice) is a Portuguese-Brazilian-Spanish animated preschoolers' television series created by Diogo Viegas.

The series is a co-production between Rádio e Televisão de Portugal (RTP) and Radiotelevisión Española (RTVE) along with other production companies. It was premiered online in early March by RTP Play, and broadcast since 25 March 2024 on RTP2 within Zig Zag. In Spain, it was also premiered on 25 March 2024 on Clan, having also versions in Galician and Valencian. In 2024, it was selected for the Annecy film festival.

Aimed at preschooler audiences, the show consists on five-minute imaginative stories, with cute illustrations. The fantasy that the series uses as narrative resource works also as a solution to resolve and overcome situations fitting the everyday of preschools or to propose valuable learning for the audience.
