= 1965 in Portuguese television =

This is a list of Portuguese television related events from 1965.

== Events ==
- 6 February - Simone de Oliveira is selected to represent Portugal at the 1965 Eurovision Song Contest with her song "Sol de inverno". She is selected to be the second Portuguese Eurovision entry during Festival da Canção held at Estúdios da Tóbis in Lisbon.
