= 2009 in Portuguese television =

This is a list of Portuguese television-related events from 2009.

== Events ==
- 26 February – CNN Portugal begins transmission.

== Debuts ==
- 4 October – Ídolos (2003-2005, 2009–present)

== Television shows ==
=== 2000s ===
- Operação triunfo (2003-2011)

== Networks and services ==
=== Launches ===
Network	Type	Launch date	Notes	Source
HOT TV	Cable television	2 July		
Panda Biggs	Cable television	1 December		
SIC K	Cable television	18 December		
