= 2002 in Portuguese television =

This is a list of Portuguese television related events from 2002.

== Events ==
- 29 April - SIC Gold is rebranded as SIC Sempre Gold.
- 4 November - Singer Ricardo Vieira is voted winner of Big Brother Famosos 1.
- 31 December - Actor Vítor Norte wins Big Brother Famosos 2.

== Television shows ==
=== 2000s ===
- Big Brother (2000-2003)

== Networks and services ==
=== Launches ===
Network	Type	Launch date	Notes	Source
AXN	Cable television	5 November		
