= 1997 in Portuguese television =

This is a list of Portuguese television related events from 1997.

== Events ==
- Unknown - Bárbara Guimarães takes over from José Nuno Martins as host of Chuva de Estrelas.
- Unknown - The fourth series of Chuva de Estrelas was won by Jessi Leal, performing as Kate Bush.
- 15 April - Herman Enciclopédia premiered on RTP1.
- 15 September - SIC introduces an updated version of their logo. At the same time, its international feed is launched.

== Debuts ==
=== International ===
- (United States) Sabrina, the Teenage Witch (Unknown)

== Television shows ==
=== 1990s ===
- Chuva de Estrelas (1993-2000)

== Networks and services ==
=== Launches ===
Network	Type	Launch date	Notes	Source
Locomotion	Cable television	15 September		

=== Conversions and rebrandings ===
Old network name	New network name	Type	Conversion Date	Notes	Source
Panda Club	Canal Panda	Cable television	Unknown		
