= 1996 in Portuguese television =

This is a list of Portuguese television related events from 1996.

== Events ==
- 29 April - Canal 1 and TV2 revert to their original titles of RTP1 and RTP2, with new logos.
- Unknown - José Nuno Martins takes over from Catarina Furtado as host of Chuva de Estrelas.
- Unknown - Rui Faria Santos wins the third series of Chuva de Estrelas, performing as Elton John. He becomes the first male finalist to have won on this show.

== Debuts ==
=== International ===
- (United States) Caroline in the City (Unknown)

== Television shows ==
=== 1990s ===
- Chuva de Estrelas (1993–2000)

== Networks and services ==
=== Launches ===
Network	Type	Launch date	Notes	Source
Panda Club	Cable television	1 April		
Odisseia	Cable television	Unknown		
