= 2001 in Portuguese television =

This is a list of Portuguese television related events from 2001.

== Events ==
- 8 January - CNL is relaunched as SIC Notícias.
- 4 April - Premiere of O Programa da Maria.
- 23 April - SIC Radical, SIC's youth-oriented channel launches.
- 20 May - Henrique Guimarães wins the second series of Big Brother.
- 15 October - RTP3, begins transmission.
- 31 December - Catarina Cabral wins series 3 of Big Brother, becoming the show's first female winner.

== Television shows ==
=== 2000s ===
- Big Brother (2000-2003)

== Networks and services ==
=== Launches ===
Network	Type	Launch date	Notes	Source
National Geographic	Cable television	Unknown		
Novum Canal	Cable television	Unknown		
SIC Radical	Cable television	23 April		
Disney Channel	Cable and satellite	28 November		

=== Conversions and rebrandings ===
Old network name	New network name	Type	Conversion Date	Notes	Source
CNL	SIC Noticias	Cable television	8 January		
