= 2006 in Portuguese television =

This is a list of Portuguese television related events from 2006.

== Events ==
- 31 December - SIC Comédia ceases transmission, despite outcry from viewers against the closure.

== Debuts ==
- 31 March - Floribella on SIC (ending 2008)

== Television shows ==
=== 2000s ===
- Operação triunfo (2003-2011)

== Networks and services ==
=== Launches ===
Network	Type	Launch date	Notes	Source
Porto Canal	Cable television	29 September		
