= 2010 in Portuguese television =

This is a list of Portuguese television related events from 2010.

== Events ==
- 14 February – Filipe Pinto wins the third series of Ídolos.
- 3 October – The reality television show Secret Story debuts on TVI.
- 31 December – Sandra Pereira wins the fourth series of Ídolos, becoming the show's first female winner.

== Debuts ==
- 3 October – Secret Story (2010–present)

== Television shows ==
=== 2000s ===
- Ídolos (2003–2005, 2009–present)
- Operação triunfo (2003–2010)

== Networks and services ==
=== Launches ===
Network	Type	Launch date	Notes	Source
Canal Q	Cable television	29 March		
