= Factor X (Portuguese TV series) =

Portuguese TV series

- Created by: ITV; Simon Cowell
- Presented by: João Manzarra(1-2); Bárbara Guimarães (1); Cláudia Vieira (2)
- Judges: Paulo Junqueiro (1-2); Sónia Tavares (1-2); Paulo Ventura (1–2); Miguel Guedes (2)
- Country of origin: Portugal
- Original language: Portuguese
- No. of seasons: 2

Original release
- Network: SIC
- Release: 6 October 2013 – 31 December 2014

Related
- The X Factor (British TV series); Other international versions

Factor X is the Portuguese version of the television music competition The X Factor, originally created by Simon Cowell. The first episode premiered on 6 October 2013 hosted by Bárbara Guimarães, João Manzarra, Carolina Torres and Tiago Silva. The three judges are Paulo Junqueiro, Sónia Tavares and Paulo Ventura.

== Format ==
=== Stages ===
- Stage 1: Producers' auditions – these auditions are un-televised, and decide who will sing in front of the judges
- Stage 2: Judges' auditions – in an arena (series 1–3)
- Stage 3: Bootcampo – either a series of challenges and knock out rounds and the seat challenge (series 1-3)
- Stage 4: Judges' houses – either pre-recorded (series 1–3)
- Stage 5: Live shows (1-3)

== Series overview ==
To date, two seasons have been broadcast, as summarised below.

Contestant in (or mentor of) "Boys" category
Contestant in (or mentor of) "Girls" category
Contestant in (or mentor of) "16–24s" category
Contestant in (or mentor of) "Groups" category
Contestant in (or mentor of) "Over 25s" category

Season	Start	Finish	Winner	Runner-up	Third place	Winning mentor	Presenters	Portugal sponsor	Main judges
One	6 October 2013	9 February 2014	Berg	Mariana	D8	Sónia Tavares	João Manzarra; Bárbara Guimarães	OLX	Sónia Tavares; Paulo Ventura; Paulo Junqueiro
Two	7 September 2014	31 December 2014	Kika Kardoso	Rúben Mendes	Inês Morais	Paulo Junqueiro	João Manzarra; Cláudia Vieira	Coca-Cola	Sónia Tavares; Paulo Ventura; Miguel Guedes; Paulo Junqueiro

== Judges' categories and their contestants ==
In each season, each judge is allocated a category to mentor and chooses acts to progress to the live shows. This table shows, for each season, which category each judge was allocated and which acts he or she put through to the live shows.

Key:

– Winning judge/category. Winners are in bold, eliminated contestants in small font.

Season	Paulo Junqueiro	Sónia Tavares	Paulo Ventura	—N/a
**One**	**16 to 24's** Mariana; D8; Diogo; Rita; Mafalda	**Over 25s** **Berg**; José Freitas; Sara; Jair; Daduh King	**Groups**; Aurora; Cupcake; X4U; Yeah!Land; Netas do Fado	—N/a
Season	Paulo Junqueiro	Sónia Tavares	Paulo Ventura	Miguel Guedes
**Two**	**Over 25s** **Kika Kardoso**; Rúben Mendes; Jorge Baptista; Lúcia Mourinho	**Boys**; João Duarte; Júnior Oliveira; Matheus Paraízo; Rúben Pires	**Groups**; Babel; P.Y.T. POP4ROC; XTAG	**Girls**; Inês Morais; Mimi Froes; Isabela Nóbrega; Marta Carvalho

== Season 1 ==
=== Contestants ===
The categories and top 15 acts were as follows:

Key:

– Winner
– Runner-up
– Third place

Category (mentor)	Acts				
16 to 24's (Junqueiro)	Diogo	D8	Mafalda	Mariana	Rita
Over 25s (Tavares)	Berg	Daduh King	Jair	José Freitas	Sara
Groups (Ventura)	Aurora	Cupcake	Netas do Fado	X4U	Yeah!Land

=== Results summary ===
– Contestant was in the bottom two

	Week 1			Week 2	Week 3	Week 4	Week 5	Week 6	Week 7	Week 8	Week 9	Week 10	Week 11
	Groups	16 to 24's	Over 25s	Week 2	Week 3	Week 4	Week 5	Week 6	Week 7	Week 8	Week 9	Week 10	Week 11
Berg	—N/a	—N/a	**Safe**	**Safe**	**Safe**	**Safe**	**Safe**	**Safe**	**Safe**	**Safe**	**Safe**	**Safe**	**1st**
Mariana	—N/a	**Safe**	—N/a	**Safe**	**Safe**	**Safe**	**Safe**	**Safe**	**Safe**	**Safe**	**Safe**	**Safe**	**2nd**
D8	—N/a	**Safe**	—N/a	**Safe**	**Safe**	**Safe**	**Safe**	**Safe**	**Safe**	**Safe**	**Bottom two**	**Bottom two**	**3rd**
José Freitas	—N/a	—N/a	**Safe**	**Safe**	**Safe**	**Safe**	**Safe**	**Safe**	**Safe**	**Safe**	**Safe**	**Bottom two**	Eliminated (Week 10)
Aurora	**Safe**	—N/a	—N/a	**Safe**	**Safe**	**Safe**	**Safe**	**Bottom two**	**Safe**	**Bottom two**	**Bottom two**	Eliminated (Week 9)	
Cupcake	**Bottom two**	—N/a	—N/a	**Bottom two**	**Safe**	**Safe**	**Bottom two**	**Safe**	**Bottom two**	**Bottom two**	Eliminated (Week 8)		
Diogo	—N/a	**Safe**	—N/a	**Safe**	**Safe**	**Bottom two**	**Safe**	**Safe**	**Bottom two**	Eliminated (Week 7)			
Sara	—N/a	—N/a	**Safe**	**Safe**	**Safe**	**Safe**	**Safe**	**Bottom two**	Eliminated (Week 6)				
X4U	**Safe**	—N/a	—N/a	**Safe**	**Bottom two**	**Safe**	**Bottom two**	Eliminated (Week 5)					
Yeah!Land	**Safe**	—N/a	—N/a	**Safe**	**Safe**	**Bottom two**	Eliminated (Week 4)						
Jair	—N/a	—N/a	**Bottom two**	**Safe**	**Bottom two**	Eliminated (Week 3)							
Rita	—N/a	**Bottom two**	—N/a	**Bottom two**	Eliminated (Week 2)								
Daduh King	—N/a	—N/a	**Bottom two**	Eliminated (Week 1)									
Mafalda	—N/a	**Bottom two**	—N/a	Eliminated (Week 1)									
Netas do Fado	**Bottom two**	—N/a	—N/a	Eliminated (Week 1)									
Final showdown	None			Rita, Cupcake	X4U, Jair	Diogo, Yeah!Land	X4U, Cupcake	Aurora, Sara	Diogo, Cupcake	Aurora, Cupcake	Aurora, D8	D8, José Freitas	No judges' vote or final showdown: public votes alone decide who is eliminated
Judges voted to	Save												No judges' vote or final showdown: public votes alone decide who is eliminated
Junqueiros's vote	—N/a	Rita	—N/a	Rita	X4U	Diogo	N/A^{1}	Aurora	Diogo	Aurora	D8	D8	No judges' vote or final showdown: public votes alone decide who is eliminated
Venturas's vote	Cupcake	—N/a	—N/a	Cupcake	X4U	Yeah!Land	Cupcake	Aurora	Cupcake	Aurora	Aurora	D8	No judges' vote or final showdown: public votes alone decide who is eliminated
Tavares's vote	—N/a	—N/a	Jair	Cupcake	Jair	Diogo	N/A^{1}	Sara	Cupcake	Cupcake	D8	José Freitas	No judges' vote or final showdown: public votes alone decide who is eliminated
Eliminated	**Netas do Fado** by Ventura	**Mafalda** by Junqueiro	**Daduh King** by Tavares	**Rita**; 1 of 3 votes Minority	**Jair**; 1 of 3 votes Minority	**Yeah!Land**; 1 of 3 votes Minority	**X4U**; Eliminated by mentor	**Sara**; 1 of 3 votes Minority	**Diogo**; 1 of 3 votes Minority	**Cupcake**; 1 of 3 votes Minority	**Aurora**; 1 of 3 votes Minority	**José Freitas**; 1 of 3 votes Minority	**D8**; Third Place

Notes:

- ^{1} Ventura was the only mentor able to vote due to contestants in final showdown are both from groups category.

== Season 2 ==
=== Contestants ===
The categories and top 16 acts were as follows:

Key:

– Winner
– Runner-up
– Third place

Category (mentor)	Acts			
Boys (Tavares)	João Duarte	Júnior Oliveira	Matheus Paraízo	Rúben Pires
Girls (Guedes)	Marta Carvalho	Mimi Froes	Inês Morais	Isabela Nóbrega
Over 25s (Junqueiro)	Jorge Baptista	Kika Kardoso	Rúben Mendes	Lúcia Mourinho
Groups (Ventura)	Babel	POP4ROC	P.Y.T.	XTAG

=== Results summary ===
– Contestant was in the bottom two or three
– Contestant was in the bottom three but received the fewest votes and was immediately eliminated

	Week 1				Week 2	Week 3	Week 4	Week 5	Week 6	Week 7	Week 8	Week 9	Week 10
	Boys	Girls	Over 25s	Groups	Week 2	Week 3	Week 4	Week 5	Week 6	Week 7	Week 8	Week 9	Week 10
Kika Kardoso	—N/a	—N/a	**Safe**	—N/a	**Safe**	**Safe**	**Safe**	**Safe**	**Safe**	**Safe**	**Safe**	**Safe**	**Winner**
Rúben Mendes	—N/a	—N/a	**Safe**	—N/a	**Safe**	**Safe**	**Safe**	**Safe**	**Safe**	**Safe**	**Safe**	**Bottom two**	**Runner-up**
Inês Morais	—N/a	**Safe**	—N/a	—N/a	**Safe**	**Safe**	**Safe**	**Safe**	**Safe**	**Bottom two**	**Safe**	**Safe**	**3rd Place**
Babel	—N/a	—N/a	—N/a	**Safe**	**Safe**	**10th**	**Safe**	**Safe**	**Safe**	**Safe**	**4th**	**Bottom two**	Eliminated (Week 9)
Mimi Froes	—N/a	**Safe**	—N/a	—N/a	**Safe**	**Safe**	**Safe**	**Safe**	**Safe**	**Safe**	**5th**	Eliminated (Week 8)	
Jorge Baptista	—N/a	—N/a	**Bottom two**	—N/a	**Safe**	**Safe**	**Safe**	**Bottom two**	**Bottom three**	**Bottom two**	Eliminated (Week 7)		
João Duarte	**Safe**	—N/a	—N/a	—N/a	**Safe**	**Safe**	**Safe**	**Safe**	**Bottom three**	Eliminated (Week 6)			
Isabela Nóbrega	—N/a	**Bottom two**	—N/a	—N/a	**Safe**	**Safe**	**Safe**	**Safe**	**8th**	Eliminated (Week 6)			
P.Y.T.	—N/a	—N/a	—N/a	**Safe**	**Safe**	**Safe**	**9th**	**Bottom two**	Eliminated (Week 5)				
Júnior Oliveira	**Bottom two**	—N/a	—N/a	—N/a	**Bottom two**	**Safe**	**10th**	Eliminated (Week 4)					
POP4ROC	—N/a	—N/a	—N/a	**Bottom two**	**Safe**	**11th**	Eliminated (Week 3)						
Matheus Paraízo	**Safe**	—N/a	—N/a	—N/a	**Bottom two**	Eliminated (Week 2)							
Rúben Pires	**Bottom two**	—N/a	—N/a	—N/a	Eliminated (Week 1)								
Ḿarta Carvalho	—N/a	**Bottom two**	—N/a	—N/a	Eliminated (Week 1)								
Lúcia Mourinho	—N/a	—N/a	**Bottom two**	—N/a	Eliminated (Week 1)								
XTAG	—N/a	—N/a	—N/a	**Bottom two**	Eliminated (Week 1)								
Final showdown	None				Matheus Paraízo; Júnior Oliveira	POP4ROC; Babel	P.Y.T. Júnior Oliveira	Jorge Baptista; P.Y.T.	João Duarte; Jorge Baptista	Jorge Baptista; Inês Morais	Mimi Froes; Babel	Babel; Rúben Mendes	No judges' vote or final showdown: public votes alone decide who is eliminated
Judges voted to	Save												No judges' vote or final showdown: public votes alone decide who is eliminated
Guedes's vote	—N/a	Isabela Nóbrega	—N/a	—N/a	Matheus Paraízo	POP4ROC	Júnior Oliveira	Jorge Baptista	Jorge Baptista	Inês Morais	Mimi Froes	Rúben Mendes	No judges' vote or final showdown: public votes alone decide who is eliminated
Junqueiros's vote	—N/a	—N/a	Jorge Baptista	—N/a	Júnior Oliveira	POP4ROC	P.Y.T.	Jorge Baptista	Jorge Baptista	Jorge Baptista	Mimi Froes	Rúben Mendes	No judges' vote or final showdown: public votes alone decide who is eliminated
Venturas's vote	—N/a	—N/a	—N/a	POP4ROC	Júnior Oliveira	Babel	P.Y.T.	P.Y.T.	Jorge Baptista	Inês Morais	Babel	Babel	No judges' vote or final showdown: public votes alone decide who is eliminated
Tavares's vote	Júnior Oliveira	—N/a	—N/a	—N/a	Júnior Oliveira	Babel	Júnior Oliveira	Jorge Baptista	João Duarte	Inês Morais	Babel	Rúben Mendes	No judges' vote or final showdown: public votes alone decide who is eliminated
Eliminated	**Rúben Pires** by Tavares	**Marta Carvalho** by Guedes	**Lúcia Mourinho** by Junqueiro	**XTAG** by Ventura	**Matheus Paraízo**; 1 of 4 votes Minority	**POP4ROC**; 2 of 4 votes Deadlock	**Júnior Oliveira**; 2 of 4 votes Deadlock	**P.Y.T.** 1 of 4 votes Minority	**Isabela Nóbrega**; Fewest votes to save	**Jorge Baptista**; 1 of 4 votes Minority	**Mimi Froes**; 2 of 4 votes Deadlock	**Babel**; 1 of 4 votes Minority	**Inês Morais**; Third Place
Eliminated	**Rúben Pires** by Tavares	**Marta Carvalho** by Guedes	**Lúcia Mourinho** by Junqueiro	**XTAG** by Ventura	**Matheus Paraízo**; 1 of 4 votes Minority	**POP4ROC**; 2 of 4 votes Deadlock	**Júnior Oliveira**; 2 of 4 votes Deadlock	**P.Y.T.** 1 of 4 votes Minority	**João Duarte**; 1 of 4 votes Minority	**Jorge Baptista**; 1 of 4 votes Minority	**Mimi Froes**; 2 of 4 votes Deadlock	**Babel**; 1 of 4 votes Minority	**Inês Morais**; Third Place

=== Week 1 (2 November 2014) ===
Contestants performances on the first live show
Act	Order	Song	Result
Júnior Oliveira	1	"Feeling Good"	Bottom two
Matheus Paraízo	2	"Breezeblocks"	Safe
João Duarte	3	"Moves like Jagger"	Safe
Rúben Pires	4	"Chandelier"	Eliminated
Jorge Baptista	5	"Alive"	Bottom two
Rúben Mendes	6	"Kiss from a Rose"	Safe
Kika Kardoso	7	"Respect"	Safe
Lúcia Mourinho	8	"Alfama"	Eliminated
XTAG	9	"Bang Bang"	Eliminated
Babel	10	"Everybody Hurts"	Safe
P.Y.T.	11	"All About That Bass"	Safe
POP4ROC	12	"The Look"	Bottom two
Isabela Nóbrega	13	"Stay"	Bottom two
Ḿarta Carvalho	14	"Roar"	Eliminated
Mimi Froes	15	"Believe"	Safe
Inês Morais	16	"One and Only"	Safe

=== Week 2 (9 November 2014) ===
Contestants performances on the second live show
Act	Order	Song	Result
POP4ROC	1	"Paradise by the Dashboard Light"	Safe
Mimi Froes	2	"Count On Me"	Safe
Kika Kardoso	3	"I Will Always Love You"	Safe
João Duarte	4	"Love On Top"	Safe
Babel	5	"Rude"	Safe
Jorge Baptista	6	"She"	Safe
Isabela Nóbrega	7	"Fix You"	Safe
Matheus Paraízo	8	"Sozinho"	Bottom two
P.Y.T.	9	"Best Day of My Life"	Safe
Inês Morais	10	"Try"	Safe
Júnior Oliveira	11	"Only Girl (In the World)"	Bottom two
Rúben Mendes	12	"Treasure"	Safe
Final showdown details
Matheus Paraízo	1	"Landfill"	Eliminated
Júnior Oliveira	2	"A Máquina"	Safe

=== Week 3 (16 November 2014) ===
Contestants performances on the third live show
Act	Order	Song	Result
P.Y.T.	1	"Shake It Off"	Safe
Inês Morais	2	"You Give Me Something"	Safe
Rúben Mendes	3	"Wake Me Up"	Safe
Isabela Nóbrega	4	"Stay With Me"	Safe
Kika Kardoso	5	"Rolling in the Deep"	Safe
João Duarte	6	"Cannonball"	Safe
POP4ROC	7	"21 Guns"	Bottom two
Mimi Froes	8	"You Got the Love"	Safe
Júnior Oliveira	9	"Paparazzi"	Safe
Babel	10	"Blurred Lines"	Bottom two
Jorge Baptista	11	"Use Somebody"	Safe
Final showdown details
POP4ROC	1	"Say Something"	Eliminated
Babel	2	"Gravity"	Safe

=== Week 4 (23 November 2014) ===
Contestants performances on the fourth live show
Act	Order	Song	Result
Kika Kardoso	1	"It's Raining Men"	Safe
Isabela Nóbrega	2	"Ordinary Love"	Safe
P.Y.T.	3	"Diamonds Are a Girl's Best Friend"	Bottom two
Mimi Froes	4	"Flashdance... What a Feeling"	Safe
Júnior Oliveira	5	"I Will Survive"	Bottom two
Inês Morais	6	"Who Wants to Live Forever"	Safe
Jorge Baptista	7	"Iris"	Safe
João Duarte	8	"Over the Rainbow"	Safe
Babel	9	"Oh, Pretty Woman"	Safe
Rúben Mendes	10	"When a Man Loves a Woman"	Safe
Final showdown details
P.Y.T.	1	"Pompeii"	Safe
Júnior Oliveira	2	"Oh Happy Day"	Eliminated

=== Week 5 (30 November 2014) ===
Contestants performances on the fifth live show
Act	Order	Song	Result
Jorge Baptista	1	"The Best"	Bottom two
Mimi Froes	2	"Diamonds"	Safe
João Duarte	3	"I Wanna Dance with Somebody (Who Loves Me)"	Safe
Rúben Mendes	4	"Killing Me Softly with His Song"	Safe
Babel	5	"The One That Got Away"	Safe
Isabela Nóbrega	6	"Back to Black"	Safe
P.Y.T.	7	"Give Me All Your Luvin'"	Bottom two
Kika Kardoso	8	"Hero"	Safe
Inês Morais	9	"Crazy in Love"	Safe
Final showdown details
Jorge Baptista	1	"Wicked Game"	Safe
P.Y.T.	2	"Counting Stars"	Eliminated

=== Week 6 (7 December 2014) ===
- Theme: Songs from The Beatles

Contestants performances on the sixth live show
Act	Order	Song	Result
Rúben Mendes	1	"Come Together"	Safe
João Duarte	2	"Let It Be"	Bottom three
Isabela Nóbrega	3	"A Hard Day's Night"	Eliminated
Kika Kardoso	4	"With a Little Help from My Friends"	Safe
Babel	5	"Hey Jude"	Safe
Inês Morais	6	"Something"	Safe
Jorge Baptista	7	"Yesterday"	Bottom three
Mimi Froes	8	"Don't Let Me Down"	Safe
Final showdown details
João Duarte	1	"A Moment Like This"	Eliminated
Jorge Baptista	2	"Everybody's Gotta Learn Sometimes"	Safe

=== Week 7 (14 December 2014) ===
Contestants performances on the seventh live show
Act	Order	First Song	Order	Second Song	Result
Jorge Baptista	1	"Magic"	7	"Dancing in the Dark"	Bottom two
Inês Morais	2	"Prayer in C"	10	"The Power of Love"	Bottom two
Mimi Froes	3	"Balada do Desajeitado"	8	"Like a Prayer"	Safe
Kika Kardoso	4	"Story of My Life"	9	"Thriller"	Safe
Rúben Mendes	5	"Budapest"	11	"Somebody to Love"	Safe
Babel	6	"Say Something"	12	"With or Without You"	Safe
Final showdown details
Jorge Baptista	1	"Karma Police"			Eliminated
Inês Morais	2	"I Was Here"			Safe

=== Week 8 (21 December 2014) ===
Contestants performances on the eighth live show
Act	Order	First Song	Order	Second Song	Result
Kika Kardoso	1	"Hallelujah"	9	"Halo"	Safe
Inês Morais	2	"Have Yourself a Merry Little Christmas"	10	"Un-Break My Heart"	Safe
Rúben Mendes	3	"When You Believe"	6	"Please Come Home for Christmas"	Safe
Mimi Froes	4	"Santa Claus Is Coming to Town"	7	"One"	Bottom two
Babel	5	"Gravity"	8	"Do They Know It's Christmas?"	Bottom two
Final showdown details
Mimi Froes	1	"People Help the People"			Eliminated
Babel	2	"Broken Strings"			Safe

=== Week 9 (28 December 2014) ===
Contestants performances on the ninth live show
Act	Order	First Song	Order	Second Song (duet)	Result
Ines Morais	1	"Mirrors"	5	"Let Me Be" (with Mónica Ferraz)	Safe
Kika Kardoso	2	"Canção de Alterne"	6	"Wonder Why" (with The Black Mamba)	Safe
Rúben Mendes	3	"Dance Little Sister"	7	"Mountains" (with Carolina Deslandes)	Bottom two
Babel	4	"More Than Words"	8	"S.O.L.O." (with D8)	Bottom two
Final showdown details
Rúben Mendes	1	"Always"			Safe
Babel	2	"One"			Eliminated

=== Week 10 (31 December 2014) ===
==== Round 1 ====
Contestants performances on the Round 1
Act	Order	First Song	Order	Second Song	Result
Kika Kardoso	1	"Girl on Fire"	6	"Because of You"	Safe
Rúben Mendes	2	"Love Never Felt So Good"	4	"Uptown Funk"	Safe
Inês Morais	3	"Todo o Tempo do Mundo"	5	"Set Fire to the Rain"	Third Place

==== Final Round ====
Contestants performances on the Final Round
Act	Order	Winner's Single	Result
Kika Kardoso	1	"Hero"	Winner
Rúben Mendes	2	"Hero"	Runner-up
