= 1995 in Portuguese television =

This is a list of Portuguese television related events from 1995.

== Events ==
- Unknown - Inês Santos, performing as Sinéad O'Connor wins the second series of Chuva de Estrelas.

== Debuts ==
=== International ===
- (United States) My Little Pony Tales (RTP)
- (United States) Friends (Unknown)

== Television shows ==
=== 1990s ===
- Chuva de Estrelas (1993-2000)

== Networks and services ==
=== Launches ===
Network	Type	Launch date	Notes	Source
Discovery Channel	Satellite television	18 October		
The History Channel	Cable television	1 November		
