= 1999 in Portuguese television =

This is a list of Portuguese television related events from 1999.

== Events ==
- Unknown – Ricardo Sousa and Sandra Godinho perform in the final of the sixth series of Chuva de Estrelas performing as Meat Loaf and Ellen Foley.

== Debuts ==
=== International ===
- (United States) Dawson's Creek (Unknown)

== Television shows ==
=== 1990s ===
- Chuva de Estrelas (1993–2000)

== Networks and services ==
=== Launches ===
Network	Type	Launch date	Notes	Source
Historia	Cable television	March		
CNL	Cable television	15 September		
