= 1998 in Portuguese television =

This is a list of Portuguese television related events from 1998.

== Events ==
- Unknown - Carlos Bruno, performing as Michael Stipe wins the fifth series of Chuva de Estrelas.

== Debuts ==
=== International ===
- (United States) Buffy the Vampire Slayer (Unknown)

== Television shows ==
=== 1990s ===
- Chuva de Estrelas (1993-2000)

== Networks and services ==
=== Launches ===
Network	Type	Launch date	Notes	Source
TVCine	Cable television	Unknown		
Sport TV	Satellite television	16 September		
