= 1994 in Portuguese television =

This is a list of Portuguese television related events from 1994.

== Events ==
- 1 October - Commercial launch of the TV Cabo service.
- Unknown - The first series of Chuva de Estrelas was won by Sara Tavares performing as Whitney Houston.

== Debuts ==
=== International ===
- (Australia) Ferry Boat Fred (RTP)
- (United Kingdom) Bertie the Bat (RTP)

== Television shows ==
=== 1990s ===
- Chuva de Estrelas (1993–2000)

== Deaths ==
Date	Name	Age	Cinematic Credibility
10 June	Alice Cruz	54	Portuguese TV host
