= 2008 in Portuguese television =

This is a list of Portuguese television related events from 2008.

== Events ==
- 19 January - Vânia Fernandes wins the third series of Operação triunfo.

== Television shows ==
=== 2000s ===
- Operação triunfo (2003-2011)

== Networks and services ==
=== Launches ===
Network	Type	Launch date	Notes	Source
Mvm	Cable television	23 February		
Fuel TV	Cable television	April		
Animax	Cable television	12 April		
Fox:Next	Cable television	14 April		
Benfica TV	Cable television	2 October		
JimJam	Cable television	28 November		
Syfy	Cable television	6 December		
