= 2013 in Portuguese television =

This is a list of Portuguese television related events from 2013.

== Events ==
- 1 January - Rúben Boa Nova wins series 3 of Secret Story.
- 27 January - Cátia Palhinha, the runner-up of the second series of Secret Story is voted winner of the first series of Secret Story: Desafio Final.
- 21 July - Model Pedro Guedes wins Big Brother VIP.
- 22 September - Morangos com Açúcar actress Sara Matos and her partner André Branco win the first series of Dança com as Estrelas.
- 6 October - Launch of the Portuguese version of The X Factor.

== Debuts ==
- 28 July - Dança com as Estrelas (2013–present)
- 6 October - Factor X (2013–present)

== Television shows ==
=== 2000s ===
- Ídolos (2003-2005, 2009–present)

=== 2010s ===
- Secret Story (2010–present)
- A Voz de Portugal (2011–present)

== Networks and services ==
=== Launches ===
Network	Type	Launch date	Notes	Source
+TVI	Cable television	25 January		
Cartoon Network	Cable television	3 December	Replaced former EMEA feed in English	
SIC Caras	Cable television	8 December		

=== Conversions and rebrandings ===
Old network name	New network name	Type	Conversion Date	Notes	Source
Panda Biggs	Biggs	Cable television	Unknown		
