= 2007 in Portuguese television =

This is a list of Portuguese television related events from 2007.

== Events ==
- 19 March - :2 is reverted to its previous title of RTP2 with a new logo.
- May - Breakdancing group Abstractin' wins the first series of Aqui Há Talento.

== Television shows ==
=== 2000s ===
- Operação triunfo (2003-2011)

== Networks and services ==
=== Launches ===
Network	Type	Launch date	Notes	Source
Fox Comedy	Cable television	26 September		
MOV	Cable television	1 December		
