= 2012 in Portuguese television =

This is a list of Portuguese television related events from 2012.

== Events ==
- 1 January – João Mota wins the second series of Secret Story.
- 25 February – Denis Felipe wins the first series of A Voz de Portugal.
- 29 July – Diogo Piçarra wins the fifth series of Ídolos.
- 15 September – TVI's teen drama Morangos com Açúcar concludes its nine-year run.

== Television shows ==
=== 2000s ===
- Ídolos (2003-2005, 2009–present)

=== 2010s ===
- Secret Story (2010–present)
- A Voz de Portugal (2011–present)

== Ending this year ==
- 15 September: Morangos com Açúcar on TVI (2003-2012)

== Networks and services ==
=== Launches ===
Network	Type	Launch date	Notes	Source
24Kitchen	Cable television	1 March		
AXN White	Cable television	14 April		
A Bola TV	Satellite television	12 October		
TVI Ficção	Cable television	15 October		
Globo	Cable television	11 November		
