= 2011 in Portuguese television =

This is a list of Portuguese television related events from 2011.

== Events ==
- 1 January – The first series of Secret Story is won by António Queirós.
- 22 January – Jorge Roque wins the fourth and final series of Operação triunfo, becoming the show's first and only man to be crowned as winner.
- 24 April – 23-year-old beatboxer Filipe Santos wins the first series of Portugal Tem Talento.

== Debuts ==
- 29 October - A Voz de Portugal (2011–present)

== Television shows ==
=== 2010s ===
- Secret Story (2010–present)

== Ending this year ==
- Operação triunfo (2003-2011)

== Networks and services ==
=== Launches ===
| Network | Type | Launch date | Notes | Source |
|---|---|---|---|---|
| Bem Simples | Cable television | 1 March | | |
| Canal180 | Cable television | 25 April | | |
| Fox Movies | Cable television | 1 July | | |
| Record Europa | Cable television | 1 October | | |
| A&E | Cable television | 2 October | | |

=== Closures ===
| Network | Type | Closure date | Notes | Source |
|---|---|---|---|---|
| Animax | Cable television | 9 May | | |
| Fox:Next | Cable television | 30 June | Replaced by Fox Movies. | |

== Deaths ==
| Date | Name | Age | Cinematic Credibility |
|---|---|---|---|
| 22 March | Artur Agostinho | 90 | Portuguese journalist |
