= Ídolos (Portuguese TV series) =

- Ídolos logo as of 2012
- Created by: Simon Fuller
- Starring: Sílvia Alberto (Season 1–2); Pedro Granger (Season 1–2); Cláudia Vieira (Season 3–5); João Manzarra (Season 3–6)
- Country of origin: Portugal
- No. of seasons: 7

Production
- Production companies: Fremantle; 19 Entertainment

Original release
- Network: SIC
- Release: 5 September 2003 – present

Ídolos is a Portuguese reality television show based on the popular British show Pop Idol. The show is a contest to determine the best young singer in Portugal. The first two seasons were hosted by Sílvia Alberto and Pedro Granger. The show, then went to a sort of hiatus, and, after only a lukewarm reaction by the viewers for Season 2, the show has officially been replaced by another casting show on its broadcast station, Família Superstar, which ended in 2008.

After an absence for four years the show returned for a third season to SIC in fall 2009 now with João Manzarra and Cláudia Vieira hosting. Season 3 finished in February 2010, and Season 4 started in September.

Ídolos had three audition cities to find the best talent in all of Portugal, including: Porto, Beja and Lisbon. However, in the third and fourth seasons, auditions were made in Porto, Lisbon, Aveiro, Portimão and Estoril. The show did not return in fall 2011, instead in 2012. The show is currently on hiatus since late 2012, since then their timeslot for 2013 has been taken over by Factor X, the Portuguese version of The X Factor.

== Hosts ==
In the first and second season:

- Pedro Granger
- Sílvia Alberto

In the third, fourth and fifth season:

- Cláudia Vieira
- João Manzarra

== Jury ==
In the first and second season:

- Sofia Morais
- Manuel Moura dos Santos
- Luis Jardim
- Ramón Galarza

In the third and fourth season:

- Manuel Moura dos Santos
- Laurent Filipe
- Roberta Medina
- Pedro Boucherie Mendes

In the fifth season:

- Manuel Moura dos Santos
- Bárbara Guimarães
- Tony Carreira
- Pedro Abrunhosa

== Season 1 ==
=== Semifinal qualifiers ===
Top 30

Format: three out of ten making the final each week and one Wildcard

Date	First	Second	Third
October 3	Nuno Norte	David Cruz	Dércio Moreira
October 7	Ricardo Oliveira	Bruna Andrade	Carla Moreno
March 30	Rita Silva	Mariline Hortigueira^{1}	Débora Gonçalves
April 6 (Wildcard)	Luísa Sobral (Viewers Choice)

Notes:
1. Because Mariline Hortigueira withdrew Nádia Pimentel, who placed 4th in group 3, replaced her in the top 10.

=== Finals elimination chart ===
Top 10

Date	Theme	Bottom Two
November 7	My Idol	Dércio Moreira	Carla Moreno
November 14	Film Songs	Carla Moreno(2)	Nádia Pimentel
November 21	Idols of our Parents	Nádia Pimentel(2)	Bruna Andrade
November 28	Latin-American Rhythm	David Cruz	Luísa Sobral
December 5	100% Portuguese	Débora Gonçalves	Ricardo Oliveira
December 12	Songs from Childhood	Bruna Andrade(2)	Rita Silva
December 19	Christmas Songs	Rita Silva(2)
December 26	Contestants Choice	Luísa Sobral
January 2	Grand Finale	Ricardo Oliveira(2)	Nuno Norte

- Nuno Norte was crowned the first Portugal Idol on 2 January 2004. Ricardo Oliveira came in second place.
- In third place, we have had a woman. Luísa Sobral may have come in 3rd place, but nowadays, she is a popular and known artist and has also done an album. Luísa Sobral is Salvador Sobral's sister (7th place in season 3).

=== Elimination chart ===
Legend
Did Not Perform	Female	Male	Semi	Finalists	Winner

Stages:		Semi-Finals			Wild Card	Finals								
Weeks:		03/10	07/10	30/10	06/11	07/11	14/11	21/11	28/11	05/12	12/12	19/12	26/12	02/01
Place	Contestant	Result												
1	Nuno Norte	1st												Winner
2	Ricardo Oliveira		1st							Bottom 2				Runner-Up
3	Luísa Sobral		Wild Card		Top 10				Bottom 2				Elim	
4	Rita Silva			1st							Bottom 2	Elim		
5	Bruna Andrade		2nd					Bottom 2			Elim			
6	Débora Gonçalves			3rd						Elim				
7	David Cruz	2nd							Elim					
8	Nádia Pimentel			4th	Top 10		Bottom 2	Elim						
9	Carla Moreno		3rd			Bottom 2	Elim							
10	Dércio Moreira	3rd				Elim								
11	Mariline Hortigueira			2nd		Disq.								
12-16	Andreia	Wild Card			Elim									
12-16	Diana Lucas	Wild Card			Elim									
12-16	Emanuel			Wild Card	Elim									
12-16	Rúben			Wild Card	Elim									
12-16	Rui Andrade		Wild Card		Elim									

== Season 2 ==
=== Elimination chart ===
Legend
Did Not Perform	Female	Male	Semi	Finalists	Winner

Safe	Bottom 2	Eliminated

Stages:		Semi-Finals			Wild Card		Finals								
Weeks:		10/10	10/17	10/24	10/31	11/07	11/19	11/26	12/03	12/10	12/17	12/24	12/31	01/07	01/14
Place	Contestant	Result													
1	Sérgio Lucas			1st											Winner
2	Raquel Guerra		1st												Runner-Up
3	André Pimenta		Wild Card		Elim	Saved								Elim	
4	Gonçalo Oliveira	2nd								Bottom 2	Bottom 2	Bottom 2	Elim		
5	Gabriela			2nd					Bottom 2			Elim			
6	Luciana Abreu	1st									Elim				
7	Helena Fernandes	Wild Card			Top 10			Bottom 2		Elim					
8	Paulo			Wild Card	Top 10		Bottom 3		Elim						
9	Nuno Lopes	Wild Card			Top 10			Elim							
10-11	Daniela		2nd				Elim								
10-11	Ruben Louw			Wild Card	Top 10		Elim								
Wild; Card	Joana		Wild Card		Elim										
Wild; Card	Inês David	Wild Card			Elim										
Wild; Card	Ivo		Wild Card		Elim										
Semi 3	Ana			Elim											
Semi 3	Mónica			Elim											
Semi 3	Telma			Elim											
Semi 3	Vanessa			Elim											
Semi 2	Leandro		Elim												
Semi 2	Pedro		Elim												
Semi 2	Rute		Elim												
Semi 1	Ângelo Custódio	Elim													
Semi 1	Jean Cremona	Elim													
Semi 1	Liliana Madaleno	Elim													

- After the show, Luciana Abreu and Raquel Guerra participated in "Floribella". Later, Raquel has participated in "Família Superstar". And even later, Luciana won the second season of "A Tua Cara Não me é Estranha".
