= Operação Triunfo =

Operação Triunfo (OT) is the Portuguese version of the original Star Academy (in the original Spanish version of the reality show Operación Triunfo broadcast by RTP). The first two seasons were hosted by Catarina Furtado, and the other two seasons were presented by Sílvia Alberto.

The Portuguese version follows the regular format, with the 12-20 students being put into a music academy and training songs for a week, and singing in the "Gala" at the end of the week, usually on Saturdays. A jury composed by four personalities of the music world will judge the students performances and nominate four of them. Of those four, one is saved by the professors and another is saved by the students. The two remaining students are up for elimination. In the following week, one of the two nominees is saved. Also there is a public vote to decide the "Favourite of the Week". That person is automatically saved from nomination.

The inaugural season took started in 2003. The final season was Operação Triunfo 2010.

In January 2017, TVI announced the purchase of the television rights to the format. The 5th edition of the Portuguese version of Operação Triunfo was scheduled to premiere in September of that same year. However, the format was never broadcast on TVI.

== Operação Triunfo 1 ==
The first edition started in February 2003 and ended on 1 June. The winner was Sofia Barbosa.

Contestant	Position
Sofia Barbosa	1st
Filipe Gonçalves	2nd
Joana Melo	3rd
David Ripado	4th
Filipe Santos	5th
Rui Drummond	6th
Rosete Caixinha	7th
Sandra Helena	8th
Flora Miranda	9th
Hugo Santos	10th
Manuel Magalhães	11th
Edmundo Vieira	12th
Nádia Alexandre	13th
Filipa Ruas	14th
Rita Viegas	15th
Rodrigo Sena	16th

== Operação Triunfo 2 ==
The 2nd season started on 28 September 2003 and ended on 25 January 2004.

Contestants	Position
Sofia Vitória	1st
Francisco	2nd
Gonçalo	3rd
Pedro	4th
Fábia	5th
Katiliana	6th
Cati	7th
Ludgero	8th
Dino	9th
Rita	10th
Aline	11th
André	12th
Nuno	13th
Petra	14th
Miguel	15th
Vânia	16th
Paulo Valério	17th
Daniela	18th
Cindy	19th
Paulo Vintém	20th

== Operação Triunfo 3 ==
The third season started on 22 September 2007 and ended on 19 January 2008.

Contestant	Position
Vânia Fernandes	1st
Ricardo Soler	2nd
Nuno Pinto	3rd
Luís Sousa	4th
Salvador Cameira	5th
Denisa Silva	6th
Alexandre Amaral	7th
Jonas Lopes	8th
Jéssica Pereira	9th
Ana Rita Freitas	10th
Emanuel Santos	11th
Filipa Sousa	12th
Evelyne Filipe	13th
Cláudia Madeira	14th
Joana Dias	15th
Sara Negrões	16th
Paulo Granja	17th
Vítor da Silva	18th

== Operação Triunfo 2010 ==
The fourth and final season was the first to introduce the showing of the castings. The casting phase started on 16 October 2010 and the Galas phase started on 6 November 2010.
