= 2016 in Portuguese television =

This is a list of Portuguese television related events from 2016.

== Events ==
- January 10 - Deolinda Kinzimba wins the third series of The Voice Portugal.
- January 14 - CMTV joins NOS.
- March 27 - Luís Nascimento wins A Quinta: O Desafio
- May 1 - 15-year-old singer Micaela Abreu wins the second series of Got Talent Portugal.

== Television shows ==
=== Programs debuting in 2016 ===
Start date	Show	Channel
January 3	A Quinta: O Desafio	TVI
January 4	Terapia	RTP1
January 4	The Big Picture	RTP1
January 7	No Ar	RTP2
January 14	As Palavras e os Atos	RTP1
January 23	Cartaz RTP	RTP1
February 6	Diga Doutor	RTP1
March 28	A Casa é Minha	TVI
March 29	Aqui Tão Longe	RTP1
April 9	Love On Top	TVI
April 18	E se Fosse Consigo?	SIC
April 25	Massa Fresca	TVI
May 9	Rainha das Flores	SIC
May 22	MasterChef Júnior	TVI
June 9	A Culpa é do Ronaldo	RTP1
June 25	Manual de Instruções	RTP1
July 14	Regresso ao Mar	SIC Notícias
August 20	Frescos à Prova	SIC
August 28	Smile	SIC
September 4	A Impostora	TVI
September 6	Mulheres Assim	RTP1
September 7	Os Boys	RTP1
September 8	Dentro	RTP1
September 9	Miúdo Graúdo	RTP1
September 12	Amor Maior	SIC
September 21	Cá por Casa com Herman José	RTP1
October 2	Best Bakery, A Melhor Pastelaria de Portugal	SIC
November 5	A Minha Mãe Cozinha Melhor Que a Tua	RTP1
December 2	O Avô Fugiu de Casa	RTP1

=== Programs ending in 2016 ===
End date	Show	Channel	First Aired
January 23	Temos Negócio	TVI	2015
March 4	Terapia	RTP1	2016
March 23	Bem-vindos a Beirais	RTP1	2013
March 27	A Quinta: O Desafio	TVI	2016
April 8	Os Nossos Dias	RTP1	2013
April 20	Santa Bárbara	TVI	2015
May 8	Pequenos Gigantes	TVI	2015
May 20	Poderosas	SIC	2015
May 26	Aqui Tão Longe	RTP1	2016
May 28	Juntos, Fazemos a Festa	TVI	2015
June 2	As Palavras e os Atos	RTP1	2015
July 10	A Culpa é do Ronaldo	RTP1	2016
September 4	A Casa é Minha	TVI	2016
September 24	Sábado Especial	TVI	2013
September 24	Coração D'Ouro	SIC	2015
September 10	Massa Fresca	TVI	2016
November 30	Os Boys	RTP1	2016
December 8	Dentro	RTP1	2016
December 17	Shark Tank	SIC	2015´
December 20	Sabe ou Não Sabe	RTP1	2013
December 31	Best Bakery, A Melhor Pastelaria de Portugal	SIC	2016

=== Television films and specials ===
First Aired	Title	Channel

=== Programs returning in 2016 ===
Show	Last aired	Previous channel	New/returning/same channel	Return date
Secret Story	2014	TVI	Same	September 11
Vale Tudo	2014	SIC	Same	October 8
A tua Cara Não me é Estranha	2014	TVI	Same	October 22
Inspetor Max	2005	TVI	Same	December 24

=== International programs/seasons premiering in 2016 ===
Start date	Show	Channel	Country of origin
January 4	Defiance, season 3	MOV	United States
January 4	Sleepy Hollow, season 3	Fox	United States
January 5	The Mysteries of Laura, season 2	Fox Life	United States
January 5	The Good Wife, season 7	Fox Life	United States
January 6	NCIS: Los Angeles, season 7	Fox	United States
January 6	NCIS: New Orleans, season 2	Fox	United States
January 6	Z Nation, season 1	MOV	United States
January 7	Blunt Talk, season 1	TV Séries	United States
January 7	Code Black, season 1	Fox Life	United States
January 7	Power, season 2	Fox Life	United States
January 7	Scorpion, season 2	Fox	United States
January 7	Hawaii Five-0, season 6	Fox	United States
January 8	2 Broke Girls, season 4	Fox Comedy	United States
January 8	Mike & Molly, season 4	Fox Comedy	United States
January 8	Mad Men, season 1	AMC	United States
January 8	Blue Bloods, season 6	Fox Crime	United States
January 11	American Dad!, season 11	Fox Comedy	United States
January 11	The Shannara Chronicles, season 1	MOV	United States
January 13	100 Code, season 1	AXN	Sweden
January 15	American Crime, season 2	TV Séries	United States
January 17	Shades of Blue, season 1	TV Séries	United States
January 22	True Blood, season 6	AXN Black	United States
January 24	Billions, season 1	TV Séries	United States
January 24	The Abominable Bride (Sherlock special)	AXN	United Kingdom
January 25	Mike & Molly, season 5	Fox Comedy	United States
January 25	Once Upon a Time, season 5	AXN White	United States
January 25	Mad Dogs, season 1	AXN	United States
January 25	I Love Paraisópolis	SIC	Brazil
January 26	The X-Files, season 10	Fox	United States
January 28	The Magicians, season 1	Syfy	United States
January 30	The Fall, season 2	TV Séries	United Kingdom / Ireland
January 30	The Americans, season 3	Fox Crime	United States
February 6	Mad Men, season 2	AMC	United States
February 7	Hannibal, season 1	AXN Black	United States
February 8	Buffy the Vampire Slayer, season 1	Syfy	United States
February 9	NCIS, season 12	AXN	United States
February 11	Chicago Fire, season 1	AXN White	United States
February 12	The Middle, season 6	Fox Comedy	United States
February 14	Vinyl, season 1	TV Séries	United States
February 16	Buffy the Vampire Slayer, season 1	Syfy	United States
February 21	Law & Order: Special Victims Unit, season 17	FOX Crime	United States
February 21	Girls, season 5	TV Séries	United States
February 21	Togetherness, season 2	TV Séries	United States
February 23	Strike Back, season 4	MOV	United Kingdom / United States
February 24	The Night Manager, season 1	AMC	United Kingdom
March 1	American Crime Story, season 1	Fox	United States
March 1	Vikings, season 4	TV Séries	Ireland / Canada
March 1	Family Guy, season 14	Fox Comedy	United States
March 4	Lego Bionicle: The Journey to One	Netflix	United States
March 4	Lego Friends: The Power of Friendship	Netflix	United States
March 5	House of Cards, season 4	TV Séries	United States
March 5	Melissa and Joey, season 5	AXN White	United States
March 5	Mad Men, season 3	AMC	United States
March 6	Suburgatory, season 3	AXN White	United States
March 9	Last Man Standing, season 4	Fox Comedy	United States
March 10	Unforgettable, season 4	AXN	United States
March 11	Bitten, season 3	MOV	Canada
March 11	Flaked, season 1	Netflix	United States
March 12	The Family, season 1	TV Séries	United States
March 18	Daredevil, season 2	Netflix	United States
March 19	The Blacklist, season 3	SIC	United States
March 21	Powers, season 1	MOV	United States
March 23	Versailles, season 1	RTP1	France / Canada
March 25	Bates Motel, season 4	TV Séries	United States
March 29	Houdini and Doyle, season 1	AXN	United Kingdom / Canada
March 30	Criminal Minds: Beyond Borders, season 1	AXN	United States
March 31	Ash vs. Evil Dead, season 1	MOV	United States
April 1	Banshee, season 4	TV Séries	United States
April 1	True Blood, season 7	AXN Black	United States
April 1	The Ranch, season 1	Netflix	United States
April 2	Baby Daddy, season 5	AXN White	United States
April 4	Endeavour, season 1	Fox Crime	United Kingdom
April 6	Z Nation, season 2	MOV	United States
April 11	11.22.63, season 1	Fox	United States
April 11	Fear the Walking Dead, season 2	AMC	United States
April 11	Rush Hour, season 1	AXN	United States
April 14	Orphan Black, season 4	Netflix	Canada
April 15	Unbreakable Kimmy Schmidt, season 2	Netflix	United States
April 17	Game of Silence, season 1	TV Séries	United States
April 21	House of Lies, season 5	TV Séries	United States
April 24	Outlander, season 2	TV Séries	United States
April 24	Silicon Valley, season 3	TV Séries	United States
April 25	Veep, season 5	TV Séries	United States
April 25	Game of Thrones, season 6	Syfy	United States
April 28	Bones, season 11	Fox Life	United States
April 29	12 Monkeys, season 2	MOV	United States
April 30	Elementary, season 3	Fox Crime	United States
May 2	Endeavour, season 2	Fox Crime	United Kingdom
May 3	Chicago PD, season 2	Fox	United States
May 3	Royal Pains, season 7	AXN White	United States
May 5	Marseille, season 1	Netflix	France
May 6	Grace and Frankie, season 2	Netflix	United States
May 6	The Middle, season 6	Fox Comedy	United States
May 9	Penny Dreadful, season 3	TV Séries	United States
May 9	New Girl, season 1	Fox Comedy	United States
May 11	Chelsea, season 1	Netflix	United States
May 21	Cristela, season 1	Fox Comedy	United States
May 24	Malcolm in the Middle, season 1	Fox Comedy	United States
May 27	Bloodline, season 2	Netflix	United States
May 30	Endeavour, season 3	Fox Crime	United Kingdom
June 5	The Big Bang Theory, season 8	AXN White	United States
June 6	Outcast, season 1	Fox	United States
June 6	Wayward Pines, season 2	Fox	United States
June 7	Rosewood, season 1	Fox Life	United States
June 7	Mr. Selfridge, season 4	Fox Life	United Kingdom
June 9	Modern Family, season 7	Fox Comedy	United States
June 10	Powers, season 2	TV Séries	United States
June 10	The Vampire Diaries, season 5	AXN Black	United States
June 14	Beauty & the Beast, season 4	TV Séries	United States
June 14	Black Sails, season 3	AXN	United States
June 17	Orange is the New Black, season 4	Netflix	United States
June 22	Agents of S.H.I.E.L.D., season 3	Fox	United States
June 28	New Girl, season 4	Fox Comedy	United States

== Deaths ==
Date	Name	Age	Cinematic Credibility
14 March	Nicolau Breyner	75	Portuguese actor & movie producer
