= Telephone numbers in Portugal =

- Location of Portugal (dark green)

Location
- Country: Portugal
- Continent: Europe
- Type: Closed
- NSN length: 9

Access codes
- Country code: +351
- International access: 00
- Long-distance: none

Portugal changed to a closed telephone numbering plan on 31 October 1999; previously, the trunk prefix was '0', but this was dropped.

For landline subscribers, the area code, prefixed by the digit '2', was incorporated into the subscriber's number. For mobile subscribers, formerly seven (to call another subscriber using the same operator) or eleven (to call any mobile subscriber) digits were used. For special number ranges, formerly ten digits were used, but the initial '0' was dropped. These changes made that nine digits were used for all calls after 1999.

Before 1999 Portugal Telecom controlled Portugal's entire landline telephone network. On 16 December 1999 Anacom announced that the market would be opened to competitors on 1 January 2000.

== Geographic numbering ==
Numbering examples for Lisbon area:

         xxx xxxx (before 1999, within Lisbon)
      01 xxx xxxx (before 1999, within Portugal, including Lisbon)
 +351 1 xxx xxxx (before 1999, outside Portugal)
      2x xxx xxxx (after 1999, within Portugal, including Lisbon)
      2x(x) xxx xxx (present day, within Portugal, including Lisbon)
 +351 21 xxx xxxx (after 1999, outside Portugal)
 +351 2x(x) xxx xxx (present day, outside Portugal)

== Mobile telephone numbering ==
Mobiles similarly changed, with the digits 9T replacing the prefix 093T, where T is a digit specific to a mobile operator, that can be 1 (Telecel, now Vodafone Portugal), 0, 2 or 6 (TMN/MEO) or 3 (Optimus/NOS):

          xxx xxxx (before 1999 for Portuguese subscribers using the same mobile operator)
     093T xxx xxxx (before 1999 within Portugal, T=1,3,6)
 +351 93T xxx xxxx (before 1999 outside Portugal, T=1,3,6) 
       9T xxx xxxx (after 1999 within Portugal, T=1,2,3,6)
 +351 9T xxx xxxx (after 1999 outside Portugal, T=1,2,3,6)
 +351 9Tx xxx xxx (present day outside Portugal, T=0,1,2,3,6)

== Other numbering ==
New number ranges include:

 10xx        Carrier selection codes
 30x xxx xxx VoIP carriers
 607 xxx xxx Premium rate
 7xx xxx xxx Flat tariff, private networks, inter-operator routing
 884 xxx xxx Personal numbering
 882 xxx xxx Virtual card services 
 800 xxx xxx Freephone
 808 xxx xxx Shared cost
 809 xxx xxx Shared cost

== Prefix list ==
	x=0	x=1	x=2	x=3	x=4	x=5	x=6	x=7	x=8	x=9
20x	-									
21x	Lisboa									
22x	Porto									
23x	-	Mealhada	Viseu	Figueira da Foz	Aveiro	Arganil	Pombal	-	Seia	Coimbra
24x	-	Abrantes	Ponte de Sôr	Santarém	Leiria	Portalegre	-	-	-	Torres Novas
25x	-	Valença	Vila Nova de Famalicão	Braga	Peso da Régua	Penafiel	São João da Madeira	Braga	Viana do Castelo	Vila Real
26x	-	Torres Vedras	Caldas da Rainha	Vila Franca de Xira	-	Setúbal	Évora	-	Estremoz	Santiago do Cacém
27x	-	Guarda	Castelo Branco	Bragança	Proença-a-Nova	Covilhã	Chaves	Idanha-a-Nova	Mirandela	Moncorvo
28x	-	Tavira	Portimão	Odemira	Beja	Moura	Castro Verde	-	-	Faro
29x	-	Funchal	Horta	-	-	Angra do Heroísmo	Ponta Delgada	-	-	-
