= 2015 in Portuguese television =

This is a list of Portuguese television related events from 2015.

== Events ==
- January 1 – Elisabete Moutinho wins series 5 of Secret Story, becoming the show's first female winner of the regular format.
- February 22 – Sofia Sousa, the runner up of series 4 of Secret Story wins series 3 of Secret Story: Desafio Final.
- March 15 – Bruno Sousa, 3rd finalist of series 5 of Secret Story wins series 1 of Secret Story: Luta Pelo Poder.
- April 5 – Liliana Garcia wins series 2 of Achas que Sabes Dançar?.
- April 12 – Acrobatic gymnastics troupe The Artgym Company wins the first series of Got Talent Portugal.
- May 20 – Animal welfare groups announce that a campaign to halt Dolphins with the Stars, a show involving celebrities performing with dolphins, has been suspended.
- June 7 – Morangos com Açúcar actress Sara Prata and her partner Marco Moreira win series 3 of Dança com as Estrelas.
- August 23 – João Couto wins series 6 of Ídolos.
- November 18 – FX Portugal is being renamed Fox Comedy Portugal.
- December 1 – TVI's cable channel +TVI is closing after three years of being on air.
- December 31 – Kelly Medeiros wins series 3 of A Quinta.

== Television shows ==
=== Programs debuting in 2015 ===
Start date	Show	Channel
February 22	Secret Story: Luta Pelo Poder	TVI
February 22	Cartas da Alma	TVI
March 11	Memórias da Revolução	RTP1
March 15	A Única Mulher	TVI
March 21	Shark Tank	SIC
March 30	The Money Drop: Entre a Ganhar	TVI
May 16	O Homem do Saco	RTP1
May 17	Cook Off - Duelo de Sabores	RTP1
May 18	Poderosas	SIC
June 17	Agora a Sério	RTP1
July 4	Tem Um Minuto?	RTP1
August 23	Pequenos Gigantes	TVI
August 24	21ª Hora	TVI24
August 29	Som de Cristal	SIC
September 7	Coração D'Ouro	SIC
September 14	Cristina	TVI
September 14	Isso é Tudo Muito Bonito, Mas	TVI
September 28	Santa Bárbara	TVI
October 5	Horas Extraordinárias	RTP3
October 10	Grandiosa Enciclopédia do Ludopédio	RTP3
October 10	Política Sueca	RTP3
October 11	GPS	RTP3
October 13	Treze	RTP1
October 16	Nelo & Idália	RTP1
October 17	Donos Disto Tudo	RTP1
October 25	Animais Anónimos	RTP1
November 16	The Surprising Machine	SIC
November 21	Temos Negócio!	TVI
December 12	Juntos, Fazemos a Festa	TVI

=== Programs ending in 2015 ===
End date	Show	Channel	First Aired
March 7	Sábado Especial	TVI	2013
March 15	Secret Story: Luta Pelo Poder	TVI	2015
April 24	Quem Quer Ser Milionário?	RTP1	2013 (revival)
May 20	Água de Mar	RTP1	2014
July 2	Há Tarde	RTP1	2014
July 10	Agora a Sério	RTP1	2015
September 3	Agora Escolha	RTP1	2015 (revival)
September 18	Mar Salgado	SIC	2014
September 26	Mulheres	TVI	2014
October 2	Jardins Proibidos	TVI	2014
October 9	Isso é Tudo Muito Bonito, Mas	TVI	2015
November 28	Ora Acerta	TVI	2014

=== Television films and specials ===
First Aired	Title	Channel
August 30	Baía das Estrelas	SIC

=== Programs returning in 2015 ===
Show	Last aired	Previous channel	New/returning/same channel	Return date
Achas que Sabes Dançar?	2010	SIC	Same	January 12
Got Talent Portugal	2011	SIC	RTP1	January 18
Ídolos	2012	SIC	Same	April 12
Quem Quer Ser Milionário: Alta Pressão	2011	RTP1	Same	April 28
Agora Escolha	1994	RTP1	Same	July 13
Peso Pesado	2011	SIC	Same	September 13
A Praça	2014	RTP1	Same	September 21
A Quinta	2005	TVI	Same	October 3

=== International programs/seasons premiering in 2015 ===
Start date	Show	Channel	Country of origin
January 1	NCIS: Los Angeles, season 6	Fox	United States
January 2	Liv and Maddie, season 2	Disney Channel	United States
January 3	Star Wars Rebels, season 1	Disney Channel	United States
January 3	Gravity Falls, season 2	Disney Channel	United States
January 3	Wander Over Yonder, season 1	Disney Channel	United States
January 5	Tyrant, season 1	Fox	United States
January 6	True Detective, season 1	MOV	United States
January 6	Henry Danger, season 1	Nickelodeon	United States
January 7	World Without End	AXN Black	Germany/Canada
January 7	Zou, season 1	Disney Junior	France
January 8	Mistresses, season 2	AXN White	United States
January 8	Transparent, season 1	TV Séries	United States
January 8	Elementary, season 2	Fox	United States
January 9	The Firm, season 1	AXN Black	United States
January 9	Perception, season 3	AXN	United States
January 10	Melissa & Joey, season 4	AXN White	United States
January 10	Sons of Anarchy, season 5	Fox Crime	United States
January 10	Randy Cunningham: 9th Grade Ninja, season 2	Disney Channel	United States
January 11	Outlander, season 1	TV Séries	United States
January 13	Resurrection, season 2	AXN	United States
January 13	The Good Wife, season 6	Fox Life	United States
January 20	Hart of Dixie, season 3	AXN White	United States
January 20	The Strain, season 1	Fox	United States
January 23	Castle, season 7	AXN	United States
January 24	Banshee, season 3	TV Séries	United States
January 24	Girl Meets World, season 1	Disney Channel	United States
January 25	The Flash, season 1	RTP1	United States
January 26	Agatha Christie's Marple, season 2	Fox Crime	United Kingdom
January 26	Nicky, Ricky, Dicky & Dawn, season 1	Nickelodeon	United States
January 29	Girls, season 4	TV Séries	United States
January 29	Looking, season 2	TV Séries	United States
February 3	House of Lies, season 4	TV Séries	United States
February 4	Transporter, season 2	TV Séries	United States
February 6	Blue Bloods, season 5	Fox Crime	United States
February 8	Suits, season 4	TV Séries	United States
February 10	The Mentalist, season 6	AXN	United States
February 12	Hot in Cleveland, season 5	AXN White	United States
February 13	Helix, season 2	MOV	United States
February 15	Faking It, season 2	MTV	United States
February 17	Porta dos Fundos	Fox	Brazil
February 19	Empire, season 1	Fox Life	United States
February 20	The Dead Zone, season 1	MOV	United States/Canada
February 20	Allegiance, season 1	TV Séries	United States
February 23	Crossing Lines, season 2	AXN	United States
February 23	Agatha Christie's Marple, season 3	Fox Crime	United Kingdom
February 25	Grey's Anatomy, season 11	Fox Life	United States
February 25	Chicago Fire, season 1	AXN	United States
February 28	House of Cards, season 3	TV Séries	United States
February 28	Resurrection, season 1	AXN Black	United States
March 2	Brain Games, season 4	National Geographic	United States
March 4	NCIS: New Orleans, season 1	Fox	United States
March 5	Men at Work, season 3	AXN White	United States
March 8	Vikings, season 3	TV Séries	United States
March 10	Gotham, season 1	Fox	United States
March 11	The Dead Zone, season 2	MOV	United States/Canada
March 12	Cops, season 26	Fox Crime	United States
March 17	Black Sails, season 2	AXN	United States
March 17	Battle Creek, season 1	TV Séries	United States
March 18	Betrayal, season 1	AXN White	United States
March 20	American Crime, season 1	TV Séries	United States
March 21	O Caçador	SIC	Brazil
March 22	Powers, season 1	TV Séries	United States
March 22	Jo, season 1	Fox Crime	France
March 23	Defiance, season 2	MOV	United States
March 23	Agatha Christie's Marple, season 4	Fox Crime	United Kingdom
March 27	Bron/Broen, season 2	AXN	Sweden/Denmark
March 30	Bates Motel, season 3	TV Séries	United States
March 30	Modern Family, season 6	Fox Life	United States
April 2	Agatha Christie's Marple, season 5	Fox Crime	United Kingdom
April 5	Baby Daddy, season 4	AXN White	United States
April 6	CSI: Cyber, season 1	Fox	United States
April 6	Halt and Catch Fire, season 1	AMC	United States
April 6	Once Upon a Time, season 4	AXN White	United States
April 6	The 7D, season 1	Disney Channel	United States
April 6	Babilônia	SIC	Brazil
April 7	The Dead Zone, season 3	MOV	United States/Canada
April 9	Agatha Christie's Marple, season 6	Fox Crime	United Kingdom
April 11	Sons of Anarchy, season 6	Fox Crime	United States
April 13	Game of Thrones, season 5	Syfy	United States
April 13	The Next Step, season 1	Disney Channel	Canada
April 14	Fargo, season 1	MOV	United States
April 19	American Odyssey, season 1	TV Séries	United States
April 21	Backstrom, season 1	Fox	United States
April 23	Offspring, season 5	AXN White	Australia
April 23	The Dead Zone, season 4	MOV	United States/Canada
April 28	The Messengers, season 1	TV Séries	United States
April 28	Agatha Christie's Poirot, season 1	Fox Crime	United Kingdom
May 3	Pretty Little Liars, season 5	AXN White	United States
May 4	Violetta, season 3	Disney Channel	Argentina
May 5	TURN, season 1	AMC	United States
May 7	Rush, season 1	Fox Life	United States
May 8	Deadline Gallipoli	TV Séries	Australia
May 8	The Dead Zone, season 5	MOV	United States/Canada
May 14	Silicon Valley, season 2	TV Séries	United States
May 14	Veep, season 4	TV Séries	United States
May 14	Wayward Pines	Fox	United States
May 14	Covert Affairs, season 5	Fox Crime	United States
May 15	Royal Pains, season 6	AXN White	United States
May 15	Twisted, season 1	Fox Life	United States
May 21	Bitten, season 2	MOV	Canada
May 23	K.C. Undercover, season 1	Disney Channel	United States
May 25	Penny Dreadful, season 2	TV Séries	United States
May 26	The Dead Zone, season 6	MOV	United States/Canada
June 1	Halt and Catch Fire, season 2	AMC	United States
June 3	The Mysteries of Laura, season 1	Fox Life	United States
June 6	Two and a Half Men, season 11	AXN White	United States
June 6	Hannibal, season 3	AXN	United States
June 7	Rich Kids of Beverly Hills, season 3	E! Entertainment	United States
June 10	The Whispers, season 1	TV Séries	United States
June 10	Agents of S.H.I.E.L.D., season 2	Fox	United States
June 15	Dark Matter, season 1	Syfy	United States
June 19	I Didn't Do It, season 2	Disney Channel	United States
June 21	Defiance, season 3	TV Séries	United States
June 22	Taxi Brooklyn, season 1	MOV	United States
June 23	Crossbones, season 1	MOV	United States
June 24	Beauty & the Beast, season 3	TV Séries	United States
June 27	True Detective, season 2	TV Séries	United States
June 27	Dupla Identidade	SIC	Brazil
June 30	Scandal, season 4	Fox Life	United States
July 3	Future-Worm! (shorts)	Disney Channel	United States
July 6	Sleepy Hollow, season 1	Fox	United States
July 8	Suits, season 5	TV Séries	United States
July 9	Togetherness, season 1	TV Séries	United States
July 10	White Collar, season 5	Fox Crime	United States
July 12	Under the Dome, season 3	TV Séries	United States
July 14	Hart of Dixie, season 4	AXN White	United States
July 14	The Strain, season 2	Fox	United States
July 18	Sons of Anarchy, season 7	Fox Crime	United States
July 19	Extant, season 2	TV Séries	United States
July 21	Masters of Sex, season 3	TV Séries	United States
July 22	Ray Donovan, season 3	TV Séries	United States
July 29	Banshee, season 3	MOV	United States
July 30	Intruders	MOV	US/UK
August 2	Hot in Cleveland, season 6	AXN White	United States
August 14	Strike Back: Legacy	TV Séries	UK/US
August 20	Shameless, season 5	Fox Life	United States
August 21	White Collar, season 6	Fox Crime	United States
August 23	Fear the Walking Dead, season 1	AMC	United States
August 25	Rizzoli & Isles, season 6	Fox Life	United States
August 25	Mr. Selfridge, season 3	Fox Life	United Kingdom
August 25	Vera, season 1	Fox Crime	United Kingdom
August 27	Tyrant, season 2	Fox	United States
September 3	Ballers, season 1	TV Séries	United States
September 4	The Mentalist, season 7	AXN	United States
September 5	Show Me a Hero	TV Séries	United States
September 6	Law & Order: Special Victims Unit, season 16	Fox Crime	United States
September 7	Olive Kitteridge	TV Séries	United States
September 8	CSI: Crime Scene Investigation, season 15	AXN	United States
September 12	O Canto da Sereia	SIC	Brazil
September 14	Sleepy Hollow, season 2	Fox	United States
September 14	Teen Wolf, season 5	MOV	United States
September 15	Justified, season 6	MOV	United States
September 16	The Casual Vacancy	TV Séries	United Kingdom
September 16	Chicago Fire, season 2	AXN	United States
September 19	Boyster, season 1	Disney Channel	France
September 20	The Big Bang Theory, season 7	AXN White	United States
September 21	A Regra do Jogo	SIC	Brazil
September 22	Falling Skies, season 5	Syfy	United States
September 23	Scorpion, season 1	Fox	United States
September 24	Crossing Lines, season 3	AXN	United States
September 24	The Brink, season 1	TV Séries	United States
September 27	The Muppets, season 1	TV Séries	United States
September 28	Heroes Reborn	Syfy	United States
September 29	Gotham, season 2	Fox	United States
September 29	Limitless, season 1	TV Séries	United States
October 1	The Whispers, season 1	MOV	United States
October 1	Empire, season 2	Fox Life	United States
October 2	Vikings, season 3	MOV	United States
October 5	Humans, season 1	AMC	United Kingdom
October 5	The Leftovers, season 2	TV Séries	United States
October 5	Castle, season 8	AXN	United States
October 5	The Next Step, season 2	Disney Channel	Canada
October 6	Cops, season 27	Fox Crime	United States
October 7	Transporter, season 2	MOV	United States
October 8	Brooklyn Nine-Nine, season 3	TV Séries	United States
October 8	Minority Report, season 1	Fox	United States
October 8	Homeland, season 5	Fox	United States
October 10	Descendants: Wicked World	Disney Channel	United States
October 11	The Affair, season 2	TV Séries	United States
October 12	Scandal, season 5	Fox Life	United States
October 12	Grey's Anatomy, season 12	Fox Life	United States
October 12	The Walking Dead, season 6	Fox	United States
October 13	Person of Interest, season 4	Fox	United States
October 15	Haven, season 5	Syfy	United States
October 17	The Knick, season 2	TV Séries	United States
October 17	The Following, season 3	Fox Crime	United States
October 18	Fargo, season 2	TV Séries	United States
October 19	Quantico, season 1	AXN	United States
October 21	Chicago Fire, season 4	TV Séries	United States
October 21	Chicago PD, season 3	TV Séries	United States
October 22	Pretty Little Liars, season 6	AXN White	United States
October 23	Reign, season 3	TV Séries	United States
October 25	Da Vinci's Demons, season 3	Fox	United States
October 25	Blindspot, season 1	TV Séries	United States
October 26	Madam Secretary, season 2	TV Séries	United States
October 28	Criminal Minds, season 11	AXN	United States
October 29	Devious Maids, season 3	AXN White	United States
November 3	Wicked City, season 1	TV Séries	United States
November 3	Downton Abbey, season 6	Fox Life	United Kingdom
November 4	The Librarians, season 2	Syfy	United States
November 6	Mr. Robot, season 1	TV Séries	United States
November 6	Supernatural, season 10	AXN Black	United States
November 7	Cougar Town, season 6	AXN White	United States
November 11	Grimm, season 5	Syfy	United States
November 12	Power, season 1	Fox Life	United States
November 13	Getting On, season 3	TV Séries	United States
November 13	Mistresses, season 3	AXN White	United States
November 16	Saving Hope, season 4	TV Séries	Canada
November 16	Into the Badlands, season 1	AMC	United States
November 17	Elementary, season 4	TV Séries	United States
November 17	The Player, season 1	AXN	United States
November 18	2 Broke Girls, season 1	Fox Comedy	United States
November 18	Mike & Molly, season 1	Fox Comedy	United States
November 20	Jessica Jones, season 1	Netflix	United States
November 21	The Grinder, season 1	Fox Comedy	United States
November 23	Continuum, season 4	MOV	Canada
November 23	Arrow, season 4	AXN	United States
November 25	Chicago Med, season 1	TV Séries	United States
December 2	Revenge, season 4	Fox Life	United States
December 3	How to Get Away with Murder, season 2	AXN	United States
December 3	2 Broke Girls, season 2	Fox Comedy	United States
December 4	Mike & Molly, season 2	Fox Comedy	United States
December 5	Unforgettable, season 4	TV Séries	United States
December 9	iZombie, season 1	AXN	United States
December 10	Transparent, season 2	TV Séries	United States
December 11	12 Monkeys, season 1	MOV	United States
December 15	The Fosters, season 3	AXN White	United States
December 15	Fargo, season 1	MOV	United States
December 17	Telenovela, season 1	TV Séries	United States
December 19	Star vs. the Forces of Evil, season 1	Disney Channel	United States
December 21	2 Broke Girls, season 3	Fox Comedy	United States
December 21	Mike & Molly, season 3	Fox Comedy	United States
December 26	The Fall, season 1	TV Séries	United Kingdom / Ireland
December 31	Under the Dome, season 3	MOV	United States

== Networks and services ==
=== Launches ===
Network	Type	Launch date	Notes	Source
Fox Comedy	Cable and satellite	18 November		

=== Conversions and rebrandings ===
Old network name	New network name	Type	Conversion Date	Notes	Source
Panda Biggs	Biggs	Cable television	Unknown		

=== Closures ===
Network	Type	Closure date	Notes	Source
+TVI	Cable television	1 December		

== Deaths ==
- January 6 - Filipa Vacondeus, famous chef
- January 15 - António Rocha, famous TV actor and movie producer
- January 25 - Mário Jacques, famous TV actor
- February 24 - Maria Zamora, famous TV actress
- April 2 - Manoel de Oliveira, famous film director and screenwriter
- June 9 - Nuno Melo, famous TV actor
- July 5 - Maria Barroso, actress, politician and first lady
- September 8 - Delfina Cruz, famous TV actress
