= Sport TV =

Portuguese sports television network

- Country: Portugal

Programming
- Picture format: Aspect Ratio: 16:9; Resolution: 576i (SDTV); 1080i (HDTV)

Ownership
- Owner: Olivedesportos (25%); Altice Portugal (25%); NOS (25%); Vodafone Portugal (25%)

History
- Launched: 3 September 1998; 28 years ago

Links
- Website: sporttv.pt

Sport TV is a Portuguese sports-oriented premium cable and satellite television network with seven premium channels in Portugal, one sports news channel and one channel in Portuguese-speaking Africa. The first channel, then only known as Sport TV, was launched on 16 September 1998. It is owned by Altice Portugal, NOS, Vodafone Portugal and Global Media Group (and originally had the participation of RTP). It is available in almost all television distribution operators in Portugal as a premium subscription channel.

Sport TV broadcasts mainly association football, basketball, volleyball, futsal, rugby, surf, golf, athletics, wrestling, and American sports, combat sports, auto racing, and tennis. It also features debates, news, and sports reports.

All Primeira Liga matches are exclusively broadcast by Sport TV, with the exception of Benfica home matches, which are broadcast on the club's channel, BTV.

== History ==
SportTV's first logo, until June 2008

SportTV's second logo, from June 2008 until August 2016

Sport TV started broadcasting on 3 September 1998 on TV Cabo's analog service on channel 39 and on channel 1 of the newly-launched digital satellite system. The channel launched as a free preview for interested subscribers, after which, on 15 September, the channel would formally commence its encrypted broadcasts. The channel was the first service to be created after the passing of a new Television Law.

On 16 September 2005, seven years after the opening of the first channel, Sport TV launched a second channel, SportTV 2. It regularly broadcasts alternative sports such as mountaineering, cycling and radical sports. The channel was available only through ZON TV Funtastic Life package, but the model did not work. They relaunched the channel as a premium channel, also available on Cabovisão and Portugal Telecom's MEO. This was followed in June 2008 by SportTV 3.

Sport TV shown UEFA Euro 2008 in HD, through ZON TV.

On 22 January 2010 the thematic golf channel SPORT.TV Golfe and its HD simulcast, SPORT.TV Golfe HD were launched.

On 13 August 2010 they launched SPORT.TV Liga Inglesa, an HD channel dedicated to the Premier League, broadcasting 380 games and 400 highlights per season, made by the Premier League (also broadcasting on other countries).

On 7 January 2011 SPORT.TV1, SPORT.TV2 and SPORT.TV3 started to broadcast in 16:9.

On 13 August 2011 all of the SportTV main channels started to broadcast in HD and it was launched a new channel, SPORT.TV4, that also is available in HD. At the same time, the Sport TV HD channel ended its two-year run.

On 5 June 2013 Sport TV stopped broadcasting in the United States.

On 1 August 2013 SPORT TV launched a new channel, SPORT.TV Live, replacing SPORT.TV4.

On 14 August 2014 SPORT.TV Live was renamed to SPORT.TV4 again (there's also SPORT.TV4 HD). SPORT.TV Golfe was renamed to SPORT.TV5, which is also available in HD.

In August 2019, Sport TV launched the SPORT TV Digital Hub, an interactive OTT platform developed in partnership with Portuguese technology company Magycal, available on mobile, web and smart TVs, featuring live broadcasts, video on demand, and AI-powered real-time facial recognition of players. The platform received the Best User Experience award at the SportsPro OTT Awards 2022 and the Best in Broadcast Distribution award at the SportsPro Media Awards 2025.

On 20 October 2023, weeks after the network's 25th anniversary, Sport TV received a major rebrand. Sport TV 7 launched on 1 August 2024, airing minor sports. Sport TV 4 and 6 became the motorsport channels.

The accumulation of seven matches at 6pm on 17 May 2025 forced Sport TV to air a quadruple simulcast of minor matches on Sport TV 4; these four matches being decisive for smaller teams facing promotion or relegation to the second league. Individual carriage of the matches was restricted to the app.

== Broadcasting rights ==
=== Football ===
International competitions

- FIFA World Cup
- (Europe) UEFA Nations League
- (Europe) UEFA European Qualifiers
- (Europe) UEFA Futsal Championship
- (Europe) UEFA Champions League
- (Europe) UEFA Europa League
- (Europe) UEFA Conference League
- (Europe) UEFA Super Cup
- Copa América
- CONMEBOL Libertadores
- CONMEBOL Sudamericana
- CONMEBOL Recopa
- CONCACAF Champions Cup

National competitions

- (Argentina) Primera División
- (Brazil) Copa do Brasil
- (England) (Wales) FA Cup
- (England) (Wales) FA Community Shield
- (England) (Wales) EFL Cup
- (Scotland) Scottish Premiership
- (France) Ligue 1
- Coupe de France
- (France) Trophée Des Champions
- (Italy) Serie A
- (Italy) Coppa Italia
- (Italy) Supercoppa Italiana
- Liga Portugal 1 (except SL Benfica and Moreirense F.C. home matches)
- Liga Portugal 2 (except SL Benfica B, FC Porto B and Sporting CP B home matches)
- Taça de Portugal
- (Portugal) Taça da Liga
- (Portugal) Supertaça Cândido de Oliveira
- (Saudi Arabia) Saudi Pro League
- (Saudi Arabia) Saudi King's Cup
- (Saudi Arabia) Saudi Super Cup
- (Spain) Copa del Rey
- (Spain) Supercopa de España
- (Turkey) Süper Lig

=== Basketball ===
- (Europe) Euroleague
- (United States) (Canada) NBA

=== Rugby union ===
- 2023 Rugby World Cup
- (Europe) RBS Six Nations
- (Europe) European Rugby Champions Cup
- (Portugal) Campeonato Português de Rugby

=== Motorsports ===
- MotoGP
- WRC
- International GT Open
- FIA GT Championship
- (Germany) DTM
- (United States) IndyCar Series
- (United States) NASCAR
- Others, including Portuguese Rally Championship and Weekly magazines (SBK, etc.)

=== Ice hockey ===
- (United States) (Canada) NHL

=== MMA ===
- (United States) UFC

=== Golf ===
- (United States) (Europe) Ryder Cup
- (United States) U.S. Masters
- (United States) U.S. Open
- (United Kingdom) British Open
- (Europe) European Tour
- PGA Championship
- PGA Tour
- World Golf Championships

=== Tennis ===
- Davis Cup
- Billie Jean King Cup
- (United Kingdom) Wimbledon
- ATP World Tour Masters 1000
- ATP World Tour

== Channels ==
=== Current channels ===
Channel number		Format		Channel name	Logo	Content	Launch
Nos 10	Meo 20	16:9 SDTV	16:9 HDTV	sport.tv+		The channel launched on 1 August 2024. Football coverage is reduced, unlike as European leagues, England and Italy, as well as their cup and super cup tournaments. In other sports, its programming stands out in the two major motorsports competitions MotoGP and NASCAR, in team sports such as basketball, rugby, handball and volleyball, and in individual sports such as tennis, cycling, athletics, gymnastics, swimming and golf. It is also the official broadcaster in Portugal of the four major sporting competitions in the United States the NBA, NFL, MLB and NHL the other channels.	5 August 2016
Nos 20	Meo 21	16:9 SDTV	16:9 HDTV	sport.tv1			September 1998 (as SPORT TV) June 2006 (as SPORT TV 1) January 1, 2009 (as Sport TV 1 HD)
Nos 21	Meo 22	16:9 SDTV	16:9 HDTV	sport.tv2			June 2006 August 2011 (as Sport TV 2 HD)
Nos 22	Meo 23	16:9 SDTV	16:9 HDTV	sport.tv3			June 2008 August 2011 (as Sport TV 3 HD)
Nos 23	Meo 24	16:9 SDTV	16:9 HDTV	sport.tv4			August 2011 (original) August 2014 (re-release) August 2011 (as Sport TV 4 HD)
Nos 24	Meo 25	16:9 SDTV	16:9 HDTV	sport.tv5			August 2014 and (as Sport TV 5 HD)
Nos 25	Meo 26	16:9 SDTV	16:9 HDTV	sport.tv6			August 2021 and (as Sport TV 6 HD)
Nos 26	Meo 27	16:9 SDTV	16:9 HDTV	sport.tv7			1 August 2024 and (as Sport TV 7 HD)
Nos 151	Meo 110	16:9 SDTV	16:9 HDTV	NBA TV (sponsor by sport.tv)		Sport TV has a distribution agreement with NBA TV to distribute the linear NBA TV International channel.	Which was renewed in 2022.
Zap 25		16:9 SDTV	16:9 HDTV	sport.tv áfrica HD		sport.tv áfrica broadcasts all the matches of the Primeira Liga, with the exception of Sport Lisboa e Benfica's matches at Estádio da Luz, and Liga Portugal 2 and Taça da Liga (for Angola and Mozambique)	2008, August 2011 (as Sport TV áfrica HD)

=== Former channels ===
Sport TV channels logo

- SPORT.TV HD
- SPORT.TV LIGA INGLESA
- SPORT.TV LIVE
- SPORT.TV AMÉRICAS
- SPORT.TV ÁFRICA 1 HD
- SPORT.TV ÁFRICA 2 HD
- SPORT.TV 4K UHD

== Controversies ==
A 2003 contract to create new Sport TV channels was rejected by RTP, who viewed the agreement as an "assassin".

Sport TV is widely regarded as anti-competitive, since it is the only group of channels in Portugal with the rights to broadcast the Primeira Liga matches (except Benfica home games, which air on their in-house channel Benfica TV).

In September 2007, Sport TV sent a cease and desist to a Portuguese live TV streaming website tvtuga.com because the latter was providing links to streams of UEFA Champions League matches that only SPORT TV had the rights to broadcast in Portugal. This has caused great public concern with regard to the monopoly abuse status of the SPORT TV channels.

On 17 January 2011, Sport TV was criticized by Benfica after a match against Académica. Benfica's director of communications at the time, João Gabriel, accused the channel commentators of bias against the club.

== See also ==
- A Bola TV
- Benfica TV
- Porto Canal
- Sporting TV
