= Benfica TV =

S.L. Benfica television channel

- Country: Portugal
- Broadcast area: Andorra; Angola; Canada; Cape Verde; England; France; Luxembourg; Mozambique; Portugal; Switzerland; United States
- Headquarters: Estádio da Luz - Door 27

Programming
- Language: Portuguese
- Picture format: 576i (16:9) (SDTV); 720p (HDTV)

Ownership
- Owner: S.L. Benfica

History
- Launched: 2 October 2008

Links
- Webcast: web.btv.nos.pt
- Website: slbenfica.pt/btv

Availability

Streaming media
- FuboTV: IPTV

Benfica TV (BTV) is a Portuguese sports-oriented premium cable and satellite television channel operated by sports club S.L. Benfica. Its headquarters are located at the Estádio da Luz, having a second studio at Benfica Campus. Its first broadcast was on 2 October 2008, and regular transmissions began on 10 December. The channel was originally made available for free on all of its cable operators until June 2013.

Unlike other football club TV channels, BTV markets and broadcasts the club's own home league matches. When BTV became a premium channel in July 2013, Benfica purchased content such as the English Premier League, the Italian Serie A, the French Ligue 1, and Ultimate Fighting Championship events, broadcasting it on a second channel, which ended in June 2016. BTV rights belong to NOS since July 2016 and until end of June 2027.

In Portugal, BTV is available on MEO, NOS, Nowo and Vodafone. Internationally, it is available in Andorra, Angola, Cape Verde, Mozambique, France, Luxembourg, Switzerland, England, Canada and the United States. Moreover, it is available via streaming.

== History ==
=== Introduction ===
The concept of a television channel specifically covering Benfica and its members was first mentioned in 2005 with Luís Filipe Vieira's announcement of a new membership campaign called Kit Sócio ("Member Kit"). A year later, Vieira mentioned creating the channel again in his presidential campaign, as a way for the club to better communicate with its members and fans. After nearly two years, in April 2008 Benfica selected the first production companies to create the channel's content; former SIC Radical executive producer Ricardo Palacin was appointed as director and began the process of negotiating with cable operators to broadcast the channel. A studio at Estádio da Luz and another at Benfica Campus were constructed, with the channel's broadcast to launch in November. In August, Benfica announced that MEO would be their cable operator, and Cabovisão (now Nowo), AR Telecom and Clix followed soon after. Club administrator Domingos Soares Oliveira disclosed that negotiations with ZON TV Cabo (now NOS) had stalled, preventing them from broadcasting the channel, even though ZON was the largest cable operator in Portugal at the time.

On 1 October, Benfica announced an experimental broadcast for the following day, showing the second leg of the 2008–09 UEFA Cup first round against Napoli. Transmission would start two hours before the match and end one hour after. Director of communications João Gabriel described the event as "the first broadcast of a sports club channel in Portugal, that will revolutionize the TV rights market", adding that it was a "significant" step. The test occurred without any incidents, and 100,000 people tuned in to watch the game.

Regular broadcasts started on 10 December at 10:00 WET with a news report. According to Domingos Soares Oliveira, the channel was expected to have operating costs of €4 million per year, and advertising alone would be enough to cover them. Two days after the first broadcast, Benfica announced that it would start transmitting all of their amateur sports home games, because TV rights were free and no exclusivity deal existed. The first live game broadcast was a match of the basketball section against Ovarense.

=== Expansion ===
In the channel's early years, Benfica focused on expanding the availability of Benfica TV, broadcasting through the Cabovisão, AR Telecom and Clix cable providers in January 2009. ZAP was added in March 2009, and the Dish Network in July 2010. By end of its second year, Benfica TV was available in more than 1 million homes. In July 2011 Benfica began broadcasting more than just their own games with the purchase of 180 games from various teams, including Manchester United, Chelsea and Liverpool. Further expansions in both availability and content gained the channel significant profit. They entered the French network Orange in April 2012, and in August 2012 purchased the TV rights for 82 Brasileirão matches.

At the same time, Benfica was negotiating a new TV rights deal with Olivedesportos, as the former deal, valued at €7.5 million, expired on 30 June 2013. In March 2012 Benfica announced that they had rejected a five-year, €111 million offer (€22.2 million per year), asking for €40 million per year instead. After months of exploiting alternative means of broadcast, on 25 October 2012 Benfica publicly confirmed they were transmitting their Primeira Liga home games on Benfica TV. On the club's 109th anniversary, Vieira divulged that Benfica had acquired the Premier League TV rights through 2015–16. The following day, Domingos Soares de Oliveira confirmed that the purchase was necessary for the need of "better content" and that Benfica TV would become a subscription-based channel, since it could not longer be a "free channel inserted in a network package." The subscription fee would be under €10 per month. With this change, Benfica finally expanded their cable operators to include ZON, almost four years after their initial launch.

=== Premium channel ===
On 1 July 2013, Benfica TV became a premium channel, available in standard-definition and high-definition. The price was €9.90 per month and included the aforementioned Benfica home games, Premier League and Brasileirão, plus Major League Soccer and the Super League Greece. Just days later, Benfica announced a deal with Cabovisão for the broadcast of the premium channel, and added Farense home games to their content. They closed their first month with 100,000 subscribers, which Vieira praised as "a good answer for the strategic shift he made and serves as fuel for the future." Benfica TV made their first home game broadcast on 25 August, beating their direct competitors in rating and share. Expansion continued in the second and third month, adding Vodafone to their list of cable operators and finishing September with over 200,000 subscribers. Due to the increased amount of available content, Benfica launched a second channel in October, and signed with another cable provider, Premier Sports, in November.

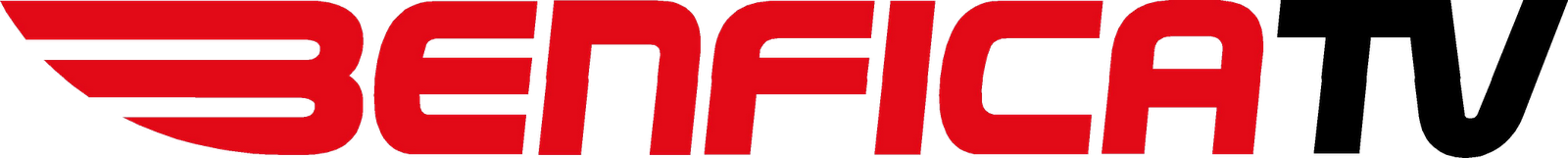
The channel's original logo

In January 2014, Benfica added LiveMatch, an internet pay-per-view option, that allowed residential customers to watch a live stream of home games. In the same month, the channel beat historic rating records and surpassed 300,000 subscribers. In the following months, Benfica added Ultimate Fighting Championship to their programming and shortened the channel's name to "BTV". In November, Benfica disclosed that BTV had generated €28 million, with expenses rising to €11 million, for a net profit of €17 million, making it their main source of income. It was more than double that of previous income from TV rights, but still less than the rejected offer from Olivedesportos.

By the end of 2014, BTV was available internationally in the Portuguese-speaking countries Angola, Cape Verde and Mozambique, as well as to the significant Portuguese populations in France, Luxembourg, Switzerland, England, Canada and the United States. In July 2015 Benfica added two more major leagues to its programming, Serie A and Ligue 1, signing a three-year deal that would last until 2018. At the same time, changes in the leadership at the Liga Portuguesa de Futebol Profissional brought forward the question of centralizing TV rights to one owner. Soares de Oliveira agreed that "we need a centralized TV deal", while Vieira said that he did not oppose and assured that BTV would continue, if not Benfica home games, then their other relevant content. On 2 December 2015, Benfica sold its first-team TV rights as well as the distribution and broadcasting rights to NOS in a three-year deal, receiving €40 million per season, with the option to extend the contract to a maximum of ten seasons, totalling €400 million. NOS later opted to keep Benfica's first-team matches on BTV, still as a premium channel. They also opted to remove all other premium content, namely the UFC, Ligue 1 and Serie A, subsequently closing the second channel (BTV2) on 30 June 2016.

On 9 February 2017, BTV was awarded with the Prémio Cinco Estrelas (Five Star Award) for the best TV Sports Channel in Portugal.

== Programming ==
BTV covers Benfica's daily activity with four regular news reports at 10:00, 14:00, 21:00 and 24:00 WET. They comment on daily newspapers, as well as recent events in Portugal. Occasionally, for unscheduled breaking news related to Benfica, more news reports can occur. However, the channel's main content is the broadcast of football matches, specially Benfica's Primeira Liga home games. Other minor content includes Segunda Liga transmissions from Benfica B and Farense, various matches from Benfica youth; past content have included the Premier League, Serie A and Ligue 1, the 2015 Copa del Rey Final, 2015 Supercopa de España, 2015 Supercoppa Italiana, the 2014–15 edition of the Taça de Honra, plus mixed martial arts company Ultimate Fighting Championship. From the start, Benfica has also broadcast its home matches for the five best-known amateur sports: basketball, futsal, roller hockey, handball and volleyball, with teams in both senior and youth categories, male or female.

Some of the original programs produced by BTV, not including post-game analysis, are:

- As Lanças Apontadas, a 55-minute program where host Ricardo Palacin and guests review the week's main sports events
- Aquecimento, a 90-minute show presented by Hélder Conduto discussing upcoming matches
- Jogo Limpo, a 50-minute show with Fernando Seara, where he interviews, discusses and debates with guest athletes
- Direito Desportivo, a program focused on the technicalities of sports law
- Alta Fidelidade, a 30-minute show presented by Carlos Dias da Silva, interviewing a Benfica athlete
- Sport Lisboa e Modalidades, a 60-minute program related to the club's amateur sports, including interviews, fun facts, and analysis of athletes
- Canela até ao Pescoço, a 60-minute humour show, presented by Quimbé, Frederico Pombares, Mário Bomba and Alexandre Ovídio
- Vitórias & Património, a 60-minute documentary about Benfica history, notable events and players
- Em Linha da Noite, a show about recent events, where viewers can call and comment
- Isto é Mística, a mini-show related to the club's fans
- Jornal O Benfica, a preview of the club's newspaper, O Benfica, presented by Pedro Guerra
- Tempo Corrido, 25-minute interview of various notable fans
- Pelas Casas do Benfica, a 30-minute show regarding the Houses of Benfica, the fans' gathering places, with facts, pictures and interviews

== Criticism ==
In 2020, BTV was criticized by Bernardo Silva, António Bagão Félix, and other Benfica members for not covering the club's elections that year nor promoting debates between candidates to presidency. Benfica had previously justified the absence of electoral coverage and debates on BTV with the exact same absence regarding the three previous elections at the club, saying their decision was due to an editorial option unanimously approved by the club's social bodies.

== See also ==
- Television in Portugal
- Benfica FM
