= Zeinal Bava =

Mozambique businessman

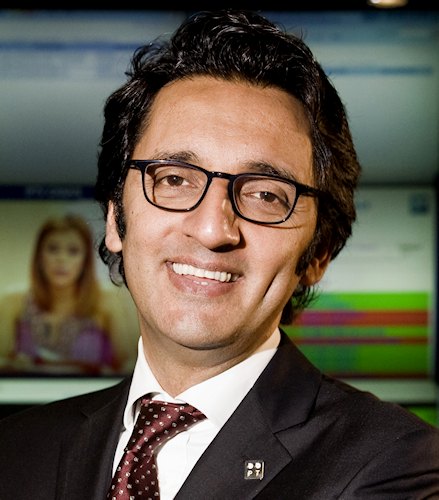
Zeinal Abedin Mohamed Bava

Zeinal Abedin Mohamed Bava, was chief executive officer of Oi until October 7, 2014, when he resigned.

== Early life and education ==
Zeinal Bava was born in Lourenço Marques, Portuguese Mozambique to a family of Indian ancestry. In 1975, after the events of the Carnation Revolution in Lisbon and the independence of Portuguese Mozambique as the People's Republic of Mozambique, Zeinal Bava and his family moved to Lisbon. He holds a degree in Electrical and Electronic Engineering from University College of London.

== Career ==
On June 4, 2013, Zeinal Bava was appointed CEO of Oi and remained as CEO of PT Portugal (Operational Company) but left PT SGPS (PT Group Holding Company) board. On August 6, 2014, Zeinal Bava announced he would leave PT Portugal to focus on running the new telecommunications company formed from the merger of Portugal Telecom and Oi. On October 7, 2014, Zeinal announced his resignation from Oi.

Back in April, 2008 Zeinal Bava was appointed CEO of PT and was re-elected in April 2012 for the 2012–2014 term.

He began his career at PT as CFO of the Pay-TV division (former PT Multimédia, now NOS) in 1999 and was Group CFO of PT from 2000 to 2006. During his 10 years at PT, before becoming CEO of the company, he held key management roles in the main business units of PT as CEO of the Pay-TV division from 2003 until the company's spin-off in 2007, as vice-president and head of the residential unit of the fixed-line business (PT Comunicações) in Portugal, as CEO of the domestic mobile division (TMN, now MEO), as member of the board of directors of Brasilcel (which held PT's 50pc ownership in Brazil's leading mobile company, Vivo), as chairman of the board of the shared-services unit (PT Pro) and as member of the Board of PT International, which aggregated PT's investments in various African countries and East Timor.

Additionally, Zeinal Bava holds several management roles in Brazil, being a member of the board of directors of Telemar Participacoes SA, companies of Oi group, and member of the board of directors of Contax participations SA and of the Board of CTX Participacoes SA. Zeinal Bava resigned from all these positions when was appointed CEO of Oi in June 2014.

Prior to joining PT, Zeinal Bava served as executive director and relationship manager for Portugal of Merrill Lynch from 1998 until 1999, of Deutsche Morgan Grenfell from 1996 until 1998 and of Warburg Dillon Read from 1989 until 1996.

== Awards ==
As CFO of PT Group, was elected three times, in a row, 2003, 2004 e 2005 as best European chief financial officer (CFO) in telecommunications, from Institutional Investor.

In 2014, Zeinal Bava was awarded the "Grã-Cruz da Ordem do Mérito Empresarial – Classe do Mérito Comercial" by the president of the Republic of Portugal. More recently was also awarded "doctor honoris causa" by the University of Beira Interior for contributions in promoting innovation and technological modernisation and roll out of state of the art networks including FTTH and 4G in Portugal.

During his tenure at PT, Bava was also member of the General Council of Cotec Portugal; member of the council of founders of Fundação Casa da Música; member of the board of directors of Fundação Luso Brasileira and member of the board of directors of Fundação Portugal África.
