= Huawei U8230 =

Huawei mobile phone

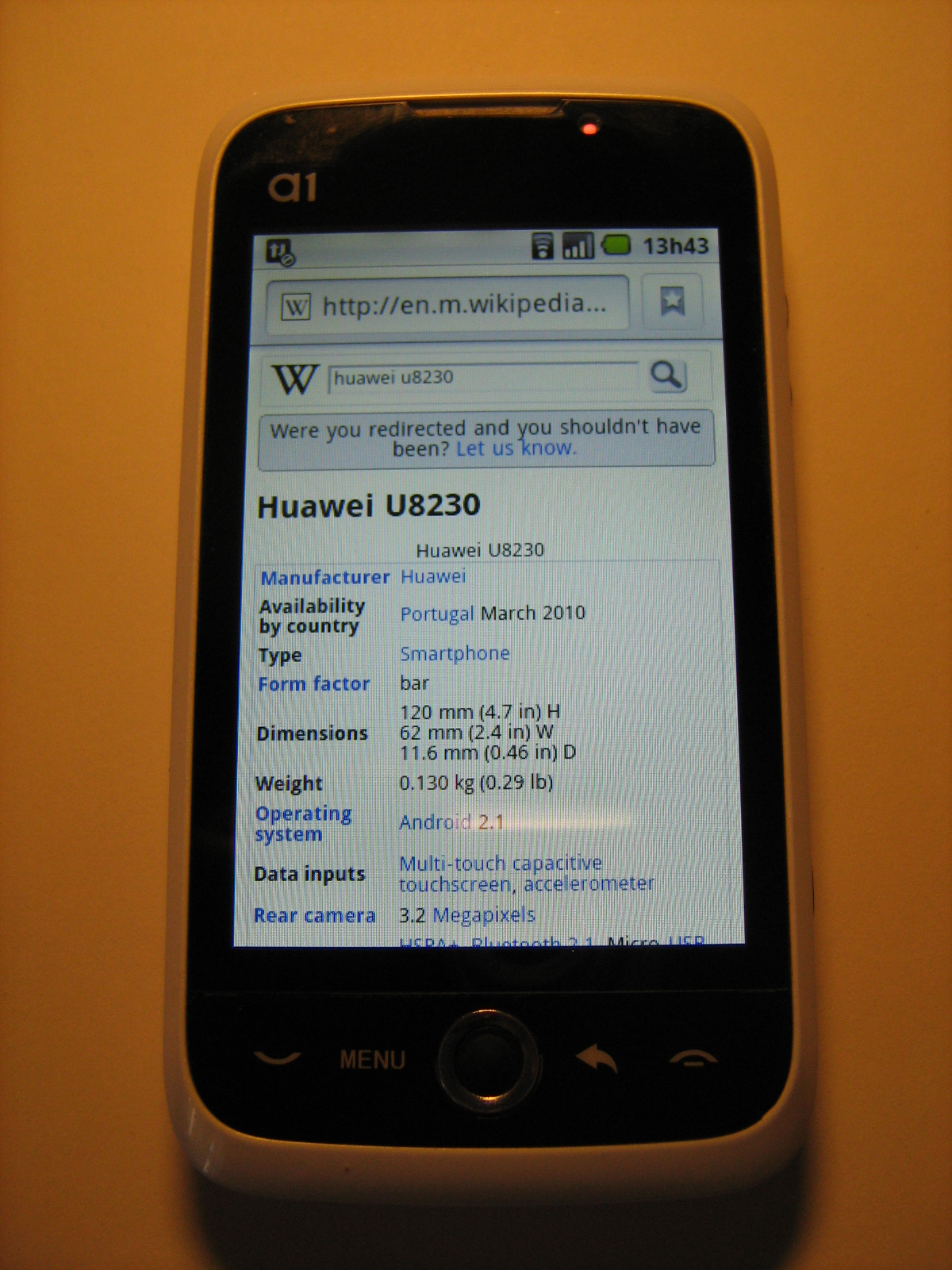
- Manufacturer: Huawei
- Type: Smartphone
- Availability by region: Portugal March 2010; 16 years ago
- Form factor: bar
- Dimensions: 120 mm (4.7 in) H 62 mm (2.4 in) W 11.6 mm (0.46 in) D
- Weight: 0.130 kg (0.29 lb)
- Operating system: Android 2.1
- Rear camera: 3.2 Megapixels
- Connectivity: HSPA+, Bluetooth 2.1, Micro-USB 2.0, 3.5 mm audio jack, aGPS, Wi-Fi 802.11 b/g/n
- Data inputs: Multi-touch capacitive touchscreen, accelerometer

The Huawei U8230 is a touchscreen mobile phone that runs on Android Cupkake (1.5). The brand targets the mid-end phone market. The phone is distributed in Portugal by TMN as TMN A1.

== See also ==
- Galaxy Nexus
- List of Android smartphones
