= AXN Movies =

AXN Movies may refer to:

- AXN Movies (Portuguese TV channel)
- AXN Movies (Spanish TV channel)
- Hollywood Suite, name currently used for the former AXN Movies

== See also ==
- AXN
