= Sporting TV =

- Country: Portugal
- Broadcast area: Angola; Mozambique; Portugal
- Headquarters: Estádio José Alvalade, Lisbon

Programming
- Language(s): Portuguese
- Picture format: 16:9 (HDTV)

Ownership
- Owner: Sporting Clube de Portugal

History
- Launched: 17 July 2014

Sporting TV is the television channel of Sporting Clube de Portugal. In open signal, the channel is present in the operators MEO, NOS, Vodafone and Nowo. The channel broadcasts live Sporting games at home in the Academia Sporting and in Pavilhão João Rocha.

== Programs ==
=== Information Programs ===
Bom dia Sporting
Sporting às 14h
19:06
Sporting Grande Jornal

=== Discussion / Information Programs ===
Curva Belíssima
Juízo final
Pré-Jogo
Pavilhão Sporting
Jornal Sporting
Pós-Jogo

=== Culture / Entertainment Programs ===
Fhit com Ercília Machado
12º Jogador / Sporting Reportagem
Sabia Que...
Fernando Correia entrevista
Muito mais e melhor
Sofá Verde
Senadores
Porta 10A
Núcleo Duro
