= MEO (telecommunication company) =

Portuguese telecommunications company

- Formerly: TMN; PT Comunicações
- Type: Service of Altice Portugal
- Industry: Telecommunications
- Founded: 1991; 35 years ago (TMN); 1993; 33 years ago (TV Cabo); 2007; 19 years ago (current company)
- Founder: Altice Portugal (in place of PT Portugal)
- Headquarters: Av. Pontes de Melo - Lisbon, Portugal
- Area served: Portugal
- Key people: Ana Figueiredo
- Products: Television; Internet; Telephone; Mobile Phone
- Services: MEO Fibra; MEO ADSL; MEO Satélite; MEO Go; MEO VideoClube; MEO Empresas; MEO Kids; MEO Energia
- Owner: Altice Portugal (Altice Europe)
- Subsidiaries: Sport TV (25%)
- Website: www.meo.pt

MEO (formerly TMN and PTC) is a mobile and fixed telecommunications service and brand from Altice Portugal (formerly Portugal Telecom), managed by MEO - Serviços de Comunicações e Multimédia. The service was piloted in Lisbon in 2007 and was later extended to Porto and Castelo Branco.

It was created on September 18, 2000, about 9 months after the liberalization of the Fixed Telecommunications Market in Portugal, it was considered the Historic Fixed Network Operator. On December 29, 2014, Portugal Telecom extinguished the subsidiary TMN, which in January had changed its name to "MEO", integrating its subsidiary into PT Comunicações. On the same date, PT Comunicações adopted the name of the extinct subsidiary – "MEO – Serviços de Comunicações e Multimédia".

== History ==
MEO in its current form was founded in 2007 after the separation of PT Comunicações and PT Multimédia (later ZON and today now NOS). While PT Multimédia employed coaxial cables, after separation, MEO started making use of copper cables. The television service supplied by MEO within the copper cable network is served on the ADSL line. Telecomunicações Móveis Nacionais (TMN), Portugal's first and largest mobile network operator, was later integrated into the MEO brand in 2014 after two of TMN's shareholders, Telefones de Lisboa e Porto (TLP) and Marconi Comunicações Internacionais (the Portuguese operations of the UK-based Marconi Company) were acquired by Portugal Telecom in 1994 and 2002 respectively.

The commercial launch of the ADSL2+ service took place on 14 June 2007 in Lisbon, and within weeks was launched in Porto and Castelo Branco. The satellite service began in April 2008, using the Hispasat satellite, soon followed by the FTTH service. The ADSL2+ and FTTH offers reached across Portugal and included broadband Internet services (at up to 400 Mbit/s) as well as a telephone service.

In May 2009, PT Portugal (now Altice) announced, after digital terrestrial television (TDT) transmissions had started, that the triple play service was also available with fiber optic speeds can achieve 400 Mbit/s.

Another service that rely on TDT, MEO TDT, which is included in the 3G plates service that is captured through the mobile internet signals from TDT. This service included one High Definition (HD) channel and the five main Portuguese channels. MEO TDT service also allows some of the advantages found on the ADSL and Fiber Optic service (pause, record...).

In July 2010, PT Portugal informed that MEO had surpassed 700 thousand clients.

In November 2011, MEO achieved one million subscribers. In January 2014, MEO and TMN became a single brand, MEO Serviços de Comunicações e Multimédia S.A..

In 2013, MEO launched a quadruple play service called M4O that in addition to the functionalities already referred has added the mobile phone, in a converged strategic logic. In July 2014, MEO launched a bundle which also includes the offering of mobile internet, called M5O.

== Chronology ==
1991

- Created on 22 March to take on the only existing mobile service in Portugal, based on an analogue network launched in 1989 by TLP (Lisbon and Oporto's phone service) and CTT (Portuguese Postal Service/national phone service), both State companies. The network prefix was 0676.
- In December, Marconi (Portuguese international phone service, also a State company) bought into the company; ownership became equally split among the three partners.

1992

- In March, regulatory agency ICP-Instituto das Comunicações de Portugal (Communications Institute of Portugal, now Anacom) announced the winners of the public bids for two licenses for mobile services through GSM. One winner was TMN; the second winner was a private consortium formed for the bid, called Telecel (later bought by Vodafone).
- In May, the first GSM call was placed. Prefix was 0936.
- On 8 October the GSM service was commercially launched.

1993

- In May, the first roaming call was made.
- In October, TMN launched the voice mail service for free to all customers.

1994

- TMN was incorporated into PT Portugal, the State-run telecom born from the merger of TLP, Marconi, TDP and Telecom Portugal (spin-off from CTT).

1995

- Inauguration, in February, of the digital network in the Madeira island.
- In September, launch of MIMO, the world's first prepaid mobile service.

1996

- In April, a new logo was presented.
- In June, launch of SPOT, a prepaid tariff for younger customers.
- In July, inauguration of the digital network in the Azores.

1998

- In April, TMN was the first Portuguese operator to adopt billing by the second as imposed by law.
- TMN reached one million customers.
- In September, third GSM competitor was launched: Optimus (now NOS).

1999

- TMN reached two million customers. It got its second million customers in just one year, as opposed to nine years for the first million.
- ICP granted to TMN a license for Fixed phone services, with prefix 1096. TMN would only offer this service to its corporate customers, backed on its parent company's landline network.

2000

- Prefix of TMN was changed to 96 as part of an overall restructuring of the national numbering system.

2003

- In June, TMN launched a mobile portal, i9 (pronounced innov), on the trail of Vodafone live!, launched in November 2005.

2005

- On 28 September TMN introduced a new logo, shown above.

2007

- PTC launches the IPTV service in February 2007.
- In June 2007, PT presented the new dimension of the MEO service.

2008

- MEO Satélite arrives in the national territory on April 2, 2008, for PT subscribers.
- Disney Channel arrived at MEO without replacement through on June 1, 2008.

2009

- On April 2, 2009, MEO celebrated 1 year and launched the children's television for Portugal Telecom.
- PT Presented MEO Fibra in May 2009, after to Clix and Zon.
- In October 2009, MEO had more than 500 thousand cus.

2010

- In June 2010, MEO launched this APP on TV with Meo Interactivo.
- In autumn 2010, PT launches Music Box, MEO Videoclube on PC and MEO Jogos.

2011

- TMN launches the E tariff, a new prepaid card.
- MEO premieres the series Fora da Box, with episodes on channel 54 and Facebook.
- MEO reaches 1 million customers and the new MEO Go! is created. This TMN store will buy cell phones at PT Bluestore (now lojas MEO).
- In December he launches the MEO Like Music concert, deactivated in 2018.

2012

- On February 10, 2012, MEO launches the MEO Kanal communication channel.
- In March 2012, TMN changes its slogan Até Já for Vamos Lá.
- In May 2012, MEO launches 4G mobile broadband and reaches more channels on MEO Kanal.
- In July 2012, MEO worked in partnership with Cofina (now Medialivre), to launch the channel in 2013.
- In October 2012, MEO chose the brand for the best consumer award in Portugal in 2012.

2013

- On January 11, 2013, MEO launched the new logo, the second logo in the history of telecommunications.
- On the same day, PT Bluestore moved to Lojas MEO TMN.

2014

- In January 27, 2014 PT Portugal will discontinue TMN brand and merge it with MEO. On December 29, 2014, PT Portugal extinguished TMN, changing its name to MEO - Serviços de Comunicações e Multimédia e on the same day, PTC merged the MEO brand.

2015

- In January 2015, PT decided to combine MEO and PTC into a single company, now renamed MEO - Serviços de Comunicações e Multimédia.
- On July 2, 2015, PT's MEO will be replaced by the Altice group.

2017

- From 31 October the carrier name on the iPhone changed to altice MEO

2018

- On August 8, 2018, MEO has reached one and a half million subscribers.

2020

- MEO is the provider with the largest share of television subscribers, with 39.8%, followed by NOS with 39.7%.

2023

- In June, MEO celebrates 15 years. Now, the protagonists from the iconic ‘Communicado à Nação’ are 4 15 year olds who, in the same scenario and with the same clothes, futuristic, with the same production team and photographer responsible for the 2008 campaign.

2024

- In May 2024, MEO recently changed its logo, the third time to have the current logo.

== Marketing ==
The communication campaign invested in a strong advertising effort, protagonized by Portuguese humoristic characters, the Gato Fedorento. In 2015, Marketing left Gato Fedorento after 7 years and Cristiano Ronaldo launches the new campaign for the MEO brand, a sub-division of Altice. In 2018, Sophia arrived, precisely as the new 4K and Portable box with joint venture with Cristiano Ronaldo. The current slogan is MEO Humaniza-te.

== MEO Logos ==
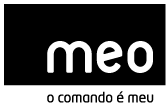
Logo used between April 2, 2008 and January 11, 2013

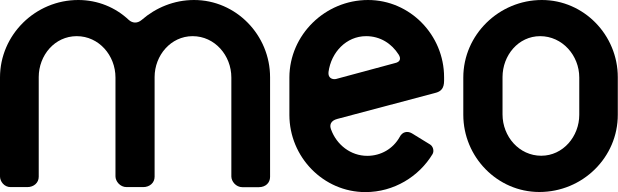
Logo used between April 2, 2008 and January 11, 2013 (V2)

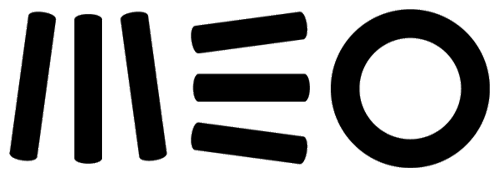
Logo used between January 11, 2013 and May 2024

Logo since May 2024

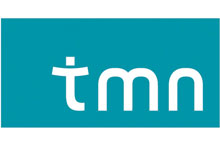
Previous TMN logo from 2005, before switching to MEO in 2014

== Service ==
MEO's technology transmits over fiber optic and ADSL—either television (IPTV), telephone (VOIP) and internet. MEO ADSL integrates a router with a switch, connected to the telephone plug to decode and distribute the signal, and another for the television called MEOBox. The two MEOBox models are built by Motorola and Scientific Atlanta, with a processor, optional hard drive, HDMI slot, two SCART slots, a digital sound slot and an Ethernet slot.

The MEO Fiber Optic service uses an Optical Network Terminal, that decodes the fiber optic signal and passes it to the router.

=== Television ===
MEO offers television content transmission through four platforms: the ADSL network (IPTV), fiber optic (IPTV), satellite (DTH) and the 3G/4G network inherited from mobile communications carrier TMN, added to MEO in January 2014.

MEO ADSL television service includes a basic slate of 120 TV channels. Subscribers can access more than 170 channels if purchasing the “MEO Total” bundle, which included HD channels. FTTH MEO offers bundles distinguished by the speed of data transmission. Just like MEO ADSL, the basic package includes 120 channels.

With IPTV channels can be purchased through the MEObox remote control, unlike the satellite and coax services. Another advantage is its speed of 200 milliseconds.

The IPTV network also enables the customer to play games in the MEOBox and to explore content from the internet and dozens of interactive apps. The programming schedule is available along with a “PIP” (Picture In Picture) showing other channels onscreen alongside the current selection. It is also possible to record and pause the show being live transmitted or even watching what was transmitted on the last 7 days (automatic recordings. In geographies where fiber-optic or ADSL networks are not available, MEO offers a television service by satellite.

In 2018, Altice presented a new box. This new 4K WiFi Box has a similar design to the previous one but is much smarter and with a much more intuitive interface.

The anywhere MEO's TV solution is called MEO Go.

=== MEO VideoClube ===
MEO VideoClube is a video-on-demand service that offers a catalog of thousands of Portuguese and international programs (including movies, documentaries and concerts). Additional features available include trailers, synopses, cast and IMDb rating; a favorites list; 48-hour viewing window; renting HD/3D movies with dolby surround sound; total control and privacy through a security PIN for “rentals and purchases” and a security PIN to access adult content. MEO VideoClube can be used inside or outside home on televisions, tablets; smartphones or personal computers through MEO Go service; and connected TV's and game consoles.

It is possible to watch movies without an internet connection, using Download & Play, available on a PC through MEO Go. In 2014, the services was refreshed with an improved image, faster navigation and new features with additional content and information, and a more accessible user experience. MEO VideoClube offers multiple payment options including a monthly invoice and the prepaid MEO VideoClube card.

=== MEO Go ===
MEO Go allows viewers to watch live TV and video on demand content on Windows, Mac and mobile devices such as tablets and smartphones via any 3G/4G broadband or WiFi internet connection. MEO Go offers over 70 TV live channels; automatic recording; thousands of movies; and access to a programming guide (Guia TV) that contains detailed program information and allows scheduling alerts and remote recordings. The MEO Go free app is available for the Android, iOS, Windows Phone and Windows 8 operating systems. The service is available at no extra cost to MEO TV customers, via MEO's home WiFi; or via any 3G/4G and WiFi internet access.

Since MEO Go's launch, in November 2011, the service added:

- Download movies to watch later without internet access (August 2012)
- MEO Go app for Windows 8 (October 2012)
- Automatic recording (January 2013)
- Tablet (February 2013) and iPhone and iPod Touch (February 2014) apps with a remote control, social network integration and a share-to-TV feature, to send contents form the mobile device to the TV

In 2013, MEO Go had more than 100,000 monthly active users, and more than 500,000 app downloads. Worldwide, it was recognized for its innovation, winning international awards, including the CSI Awards 2014 and the Stevie Awards 2014.

=== Internet ===
The ADSL Internet service offers 24 Mbit/s downstream and 1 Mbit/s for upstream without traffic limitation, nationally or internationally. The fiber optic network allows downstream speeds up to 400 Mbit/s and 100 Mbit/s downstream for a higher data allocation. In 2015 mobile internet was added, named M5O.

=== Telephone ===
The telephone service offers charge free calls without limit to all national fixed networks by on the MEO fixed network (formerly as PTC). Initial costs are integrated in the MEO service subscription.

=== Mobile phone ===
Mobile phone service is supplied through the TMN networks. Following the demise of the TMN brand, tariffs remained unchanged and the telephonic support line (1696) remained the same as well. In 2015 telephone service was included in a quadruple play pack, named M4O.

=== MEO Apps ===
IPTV technology allowed MEO to provide several interactive services, namely during the FIFA 2010 World Cup in South Africa. Currently MEO has interactive applications in the IPTV and Satellite service (example MEO Radios).

=== MEO Energia ===
In the strategy for portfolio diversification and new businesses, MEO Energia is launched, through PT Live, a partner of Altice Portugal, adding energy exclusively produced from 100% renewable sources and communication.

On August 6, 2020, Altice Portugal informed the Competition Authority that it acquired PT Live and that it will change its name to MEO Energia.

== Channels ==
The television channel line-up includes the Portuguese channels such as:

- AXN
- Star Channel
- Syfy
- MTV
- RTP Memória
- RTP África
- RTP Madeira (Madeira only)
- RTP Açores (Azores only)
- National Geographic Channel
- FOX News
- CNN
- CNN Portugal
- Russia Today (suspended)
- Al Jazeera
- TVCine
- Eurosport
- BBC News
- TVI
- DW
- M6
- TV5Monde
- Disney Channel
- Cartoon Network
- Cartoonito
- Canal Panda
- Biggs
- Panda Kids
- Nickelodeon
- Nick Jr.
- Rai Italia
- BTV
- Sporting TV
- Porto Canal
- Canal 11
- DAZN
- Sport TV+
- Record
- TVI Reality

== Sponsorship ==
MEO sponsored all the "Big Three" from the Primeira Liga (Benfica, Porto and Sporting) from 2005 to 2015, when he sold for the rights with NOS. However it started sponsoring Porto again, as well as Rio Ave and Desportivo das Aves. It is also a sponsor of the FPF Football. It also sponsors athletes such as footballer CR7, Moto GP racer Miguel Oliveira, surfer Frederico Morais and World Surf League event MEO RCP Portugal.

=== Sharing of sports TV rights ===
In July 2016, MEO shared the broadcasting rights of NOS and Vodafone Portugal on the proposal of the live broadcasts of FC Porto, which currently broadcasts on Porto Canal, according to an agreement with the CMVM.

The company that had owned the Primeira Liga matches through the portuguese Sport TV channel.

== MEO Empresas ==
The service was created by PT in 2014 after the merger between PT Negócios and PT Prime and offers a range of technological and telecommunications solutions for SMEs - Small, Medium-sized Companies and Large Companies and Institutions, such as the Government of Portugal. Changed name in January 2020 from the previous PT Empresas to Altice Empresas, becoming MEO Empresas in 2023.

== Net neutrality dispute ==
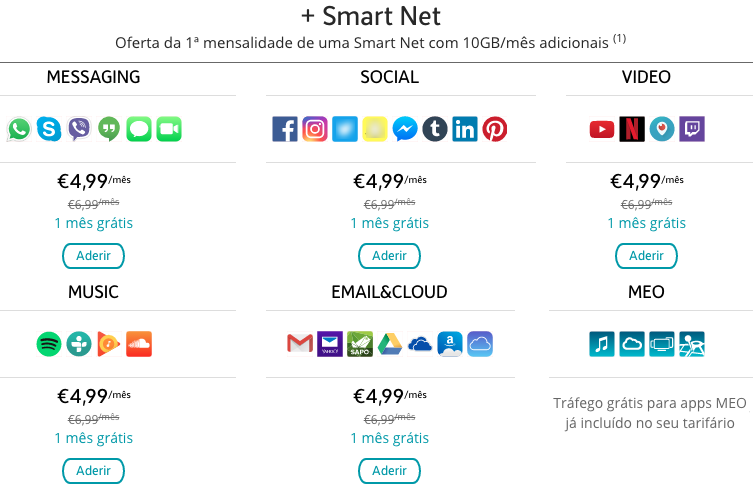
Portuguese Internet service provider MEO offers to sell additional access to particular data services in this October 2017 advertisement. Many media sources republished this ad as a starting point for discussions about net neutrality.

A MEO advertisement for data access was the focus of a discussion beginning in October 2017 in Portugal, the European Union and the United States and relating to net neutrality.

MEO posted their advertisement for Internet services on their own website. On 26 October 2017, Democratic Party U.S. Representative Ro Khanna posted a screenshot of MEO's website to his Twitter feed while stating that their sales model was a violation of net neutrality.

Net neutrality advocate Cory Doctorow featured the ad as an illustration of a net neutrality violation on Boing Boing on 28 October. Quartz reported that the ad showed a net neutrality violation on 30 October. Tim Wu, the legal scholar who defined the term "net neutrality", commented on 30 October after reading the Quartz article that the ad did show a violation of net neutrality. From this point the discussion was far ranging. By 22 November, MEO published a response to the attention.

=== Responses ===
Many media sources reported that the sales model which the image described was a bad thing for being a violation of net neutrality.

Some other media sources reported that many people are misunderstanding the image. To clarify, these sources reported that MEO's sales model is aligned with Portuguese and European law, and that law defines net neutrality in a way that permits MEO's sales model. In another clarification point, sources noted that the MEO ad is for services to mobile phones and not an additional fee to broadband service (cf. EU Regulation 2015/2120).
