= Optimus Comunicações =

Former mobile phone operator in Portugal

Optimus Comunicações, S.A.
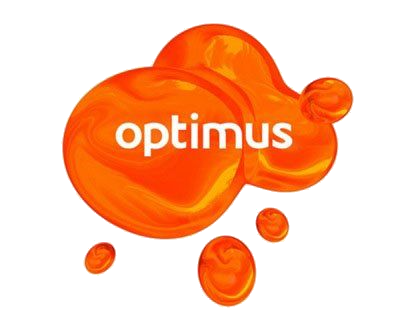
- Company type: Sociedade Anónima
- Industry: Telecommunications
- Founded: 15 September 1998 and in 2013 merged with ZON Multimedia
- Defunct: May 16, 2014
- Successor: NOS
- Headquarters: Lisbon, Portugal
- Area served: Portugal
- Key people: Miguel Almeida (CEO)
- Products: Mobile; Fixed; Broadband Internet
- Services: NOS (mobile)
- Revenue: ▼€863,6 million (2011)
- Operating income: ▲€82.5 million (2011)
- Net income: ▲€62.6 million (2011)
- Total assets: ▲€2,019.8 million (2011)
- Total equity: ▲€1,021.4 million (2011)
- Number of employees: 2,016 (2011)
- Parent: NOS
- Website: nos.pt

Former Optimus logo, until 2008.

Former Optimus logo, until 2014.

Optimus Comunicações, S.A. was a Portuguese GSM/UMTS/LTE mobile operator. As of 16 May 2014, Optimus was merged with ZON Multimédia and formed a new company called NOS. Optimus was a wholly owned subsidiary of Sonaecom (a sub-holding of Portuguese conglomerate Sonae).

== History ==
=== 1998-1999 ===
Optimus operations started on 15 September 1998, against the two longer-established operators TMN and Telecel, now a subsidiary of the Vodafone Group. The start was preceded by an intense and original advertising campaign. The company found a way to bring in customers with the creation of a statute called Pioneiros (Pioneers), where pre-registered customers could make low-cost calls for life, just 5 escudos (0.025 Euro) per minute to other Optimus customers—a fraction of then current mobile tariffs. The campaign also benefitted enormously by parent Sonae owning the Continente chain of hypermarkets, thus reaching mass-market at a cost-effective rate.

Optimus' prefix was 0933. Numbers were 10 or 11-digits long. Optimus adopted the concept of pre-paid cards, which had been invented in Portugal and was already a success with its competitors, by creating the Boomerang tariff plan.

The very aggressive strategy used by Optimus to enter the Portuguese mobile telecommunications market paid off, attracting 700,000 customers in only one year of operation (by October 1999). Market share was 13%.

=== 1999 - 2013 ===
In September 1999, Optimus parent Sonaecom launched Novis, a fixed-line operator, and Clix, an Internet service provider and web portal.

In January 2000, Optimus collected another GSM award in Cannes for the best GSM innovation for its Taxi Digital (Digital Taxi) project to use the Optimus network in the transmission and processing of data between taxi dispatch centrals and their cars.

In 2000, the company's prefix was changed from 0933 to 93 as part of the country's new numbering system. All other digits remained the same, for 9-digit long numbers.

In June 2000, Optimus reached the one millionth customer, approximately 80% of which were buyers of pre-paid cards. Its market share had by then climbed to 16%.

In December 2000, Optimus won the bid for one of the four licenses for UMTS (Universal Mobile Telecommunications System). Handsets using this third-generation (3G) mobile technology can relay images and video and access the Internet at quasi-broadband speeds.

In June 2003, Optimus launched a mobile portal, Optimus Zone, on the trail of Vodafone live!, launched in November 2005.

In 2004, France Télécom became the major shareholder, with the holding company Atlas Services Belgium (ASB) as the largest minority owner. Optimus changed its corporate image from green to orange, fostering rumours that this would be the first step to change the brand to Orange. The logo was slightly simplified and turned into all-orange.

In June 2005, Optimus launched a wireless Internet access service over GPRS and 3G, with downlink speeds of up to 386 kbit/s, under the brand Kanguru. This launch had an innovative pricing structure for such a service. For 30 Euro/month, 10 GB of traffic were included.

In May 2006, Optimus launched Kanguru Xpress over HSDPA (3.5G), with downlink speeds of up to 1.8 Mbit/s. Its slogan was: "Não salta, voa" (It doesn't jump, it flies).

In April 2008, Optimus launched the TAG tariff. For a €10 monthly fee, converted in credit for communications, all communications between TAG users (voice and video calls, SMS and MMS, usage of Mobile Instant Messenger – Optimus Messenger and MSN) were absolutely free and limitless. There was also a PC-based application working as a WebPhone, where all sorts of communications could be made in the same manner that in a mobile phone (including incoming communications).

Due to this launch, the competitors launched their own versions of TAG (only active from 1 May 2008, but with a pre-order up to that date). Interestingly, Optimus and its competitors were constantly changing their tariff's conditions (prices to other intra-network voice calls are dropping, a 1500 SMS bonus for the same network is being given, the usage of the monthly fee is changing) similar to a sort of battle being held by the three Portuguese mobile communications service providers.

Optimus made the mobile market in Portugal more dynamic, though it still was the third operator in market share (20% in 2006) and financial results.

Since 2012, Optimus and ZON have been in talks to merge the two companies. In 2013 the Regulatory Authority for the Media informed the Competition Authority that it is not opposed to the deal.

=== 2014 - present ===
As of 16 May 2014, ZON Multimédia and Optimus Telecomunicações, S.A. are one new company called NOS (former ZON Optimus).

== Awards ==
The Pioneers marketing campaign was recognized internationally. In early 1999, NOS won the GSM Marketing Success award of the GSM Association in Cannes, France, for become the third operator with the most market share after a year of operation. It was the first Portuguese operator to achieve such a result in a World-wide GSM Congress. (This event is organized annually by the GSM Association, an organization with a membership of more than 380 operators of mobile communications from about 150 countries. GSM Awards are delivered in every edition of the congress and are considered the most important of the sector.) This was to be the first of many awards won by Optimus in subsequent years.

== Advertising ==
=== Advertising agency ===
- 1998–2008: BBDO Portugal
- 2008–2014: Euro RSCG Portugal

=== Slogans ===
==== Optimus ====
- September 1998 – 2003: "Falar assim, é Optimus" (To speak like this, is Optimus)
- 2003 – 2006: "Segue o que sentes" (Follow what you feel)
- 20 July 2006 – 2008: "Experimenta" (Try it, Experience it)
- 2008 – 2011: "De que é que precisas?" (What do you need?)
- 2011 – 2014 : "O que nos liga é Optimus" (What binds us together is Optimus)

==== NOS ====
- 2014 – present : "Há mais em NOS" (There's more in NOS) ("NOS" is similar to the Portuguese word "nós", which means "us".)

== Financials ==
2011:

- 3,639,400 customers (1.0% increase over 2010)
- 42.8 SMS/month/customer (10.2 decrease over 2010)
- ARPU 12.90 Euro (5.6% decrease over 2010)
