= Internet in Portugal =

Internet in Portugal reached an 88% household penetration rate in 2022, with notably higher access rates in households with children. Among individuals aged 16 to 74, mobile internet use is prevalent, at 81.8%, primarily for communication and information access.

== User statistics ==
- Internet users: 6.9 million users, 48th in the world; 64.0% of the population, 57th in the world (2012).
- Fixed broadband: 2.4 million subscribers, 34th in the world; 22.3% of the population, 43rd in the world (2012)
- Mobile broadband: 3.5 million subscribers, 47th in the world; 32.5% of the population, 52nd in the world (2012)
- Internet hosts: 3.7 million hosts, 28th in the world (2012)
- IPv4: 5,833,504 addresses allocated, 0.1% of the world total; 541 IPv4 addresses per 1000 persons (2012)
- Domain name: .pt

== Internet and digital progress ==
=== Fixed broadband ===
In the 2022 Digital Economy and Society Index (DESI) report, Portugal is ranked 18th in Connectivity among the 27 European Union (EU) member countries. This positioning highlights the country's progress and challenges in broadband uptake within the EU context. The report reveals an increase in overall fixed broadband adoption, increasing from 75% in 2019 to 81% in 2021, which places it slightly above the EU average of 78%. Notably, the adoption rate of fixed broadband connections with speeds of at least 100 Mbit/s grew from 56% in 2019 to 68% in 2021, exceeding the EU average of 41%. Additionally, Portugal showcased strong Very High Capacity Network (VHCN) and Fiber to the Premises (FTTP) coverage for households, achieving rates of 91% and 88% respectively. These figures surpass the EU benchmarks of 70% for VHCN and 50% for FTTP coverage.

The fixed broadband market is predominantly controlled by four major integrated operators: MEO, NOS, Vodafone and Digi collectively holding 96.6% of the market share as of the third quarter of 2021. Bundled packages are the preferred choice for most fixed broadband services, with multiple-play bundles being especially popular, achieving a penetration rate of 90.3%. Since 2021, FTTH networks have emerged as the primary infrastructure for delivering pay-TV services, with 56% of subscribers opting for this. The expansion of pay-TV has been attributed to the development of FTTH networks.

=== Mobile broadband ===
Mobile broadband usage among individuals in Portugal increased to 82% in 2021, up from 72% in 2018, yet it slightly trails the EU average uptake of 87%. Despite this progress, Portugal's advancement in 5G deployment was notably absent in 2021, with 0% coverage, while other EU member countries were significantly ahead, achieving an average 5G coverage of 66% across populated areas. Nonetheless, Portugal has made significant strides in the strategic allocation of the 5G spectrum, with 61% of the total harmonized 5G spectrum assigned by April 2022. This represents a substantial increase from just 8% in previous years, positioning Portugal ahead of the EU average of 56%.

=== Digital public services ===
In the 2022 DESI report, Portugal is recognized for its developments in Digital Public Services, ranking 14th among EU countries. The country experienced growth in e-government users, increasing from 54% in 2019 to 59% in 2021, yet it remains slightly below the EU average of 65%. In the domain of open data, Portugal achieved a score of 66%, indicating a need for further progress to reach the EU average of 81%.

Portugal's transition to a digital-first government is supported by key initiatives such as the Digital Transformation Strategy for Public Administration (SDTPA) and the Recovery and Resilience Plan (RRP), which are aimed at digitizing public administration. Currently, over 95% of essential public services are available online, focusing on integration through the Interoperability Platform (iAP) for both citizens and businesses. The adoption of a cloud-first strategy and the implementation of a single digital gateway further align the country with European digital strategies. However, the digital skills gap remains a challenge, potentially affecting the effective adoption of e-government services. To address this issue, initiatives like EU SOU Digital are focusing on improving digital literacy among adults who have not previously engaged with the internet.

== ADSL2+ and FTTx ==
ADSL service has been available in Portugal since 2000, however it was not until 2002 that the service started to see wide acceptance from the general public, mainly due to increased competition from service providers, which helped to level prices. Market penetration in Portugal is around 50% although Portugal has the distinction of being one of the few European countries to have coverage in virtually the entire territory.

There are several service providers offering ADSL, fiber and wireless services in Portugal to the residential and the professional markets. The majority of the residential market is split between the two internet servers: MEO and NOS.

The current maximum speed for home Internet plans in Portugal is 1 Gbit/s, available on special request, and 360 Mbit/s is widely available together with television and telephone services.

== Cable ==
=== Cable service providers ===
- Nowo
- NOS

== Internet censorship and surveillance ==
Internet access in Portugal is not restricted. There are neither government restrictions on access to the Internet nor reports that the government monitors e-mail or Internet chat rooms without appropriate legal authority. The constitution and law provide for freedom of speech and press, and the government generally respects these rights in practice. An independent press, an effective judiciary, and a functioning democratic political system combine to ensure freedom of speech and press. The law criminalizes the denigration of ethnic or religious minorities and the engagement in offensive practices such as Holocaust denial. Prison sentences for these crimes run between six months to eight years. The constitution and law prohibit arbitrary interference with privacy, family, home, or correspondence, and the government generally respected these prohibitions in practice, except in more recent years (see below).

The website Tugaleaks, which since December 2010 aims to serve as Portugal's version of WikiLeaks, had its bank account for donations arbitrarily closed on 13 July 2012 with no official communication. Tugaleaks contributors were finally told the account had been closed for its involvement in money laundering and terrorist financing.

As of March 2015, Portuguese ISPs have been ordered to block The Pirate Bay and many of its proxies by a court order, following the European trend, after a lawsuit brought by the Association for Copyright Management, Producers and Publishers (GEDIPE). This is the first time ever a website is blocked by ISPs in Portugal.

In July 2015 the Ministry of Culture announced the signed a memorandum between its own General Inspection of Cultural Activities (IGAC), the Portuguese Association of Telecommunication Operators (APRITEL), various rightsholder groups, the body responsible for administering Portugal's .PT domain and representatives from the advertising industry to block any website they deemed appropriate. These measures have resulted on thousands of websites blocked under the charges of copyright infringement and gambling. One notable example of blocked copyrighted materials are internet databases that publish copyrighted scientific literature, such as LibGen. Such databases are often the only practical source of academic publications for scientists, the public and universities who can't afford subscription/licensing fees for scientific journals.

== See also ==
- Associação DNS.PT, DNS.PT Association, a non-profit operator of the .pt domain
