= AXN Movies (Spanish TV channel) =

- Broadcast area: Spain

Programming
- Picture format: Aspect Ratio: 16:9; Resolution: 576i (SD); 1080i (HD)

Ownership
- Owner: Sony Pictures Television
- Sister channels: AXN

History
- Launched: June 12, 2006; 19 years ago
- Former names: Sony Entertainment Television en Veo (2006-2010); Sony Entertainment Television (2010-2012); AXN White (2012-2023)

Links
- Website: https://www.axn.es/axnmovies

AXN Movies (previously Sony Entertainment Television and AXN White) is a channel operated by Sony Pictures Television International Networks Europe.

== History ==
=== As Sony TV en Veo/Sony Entertainment Television ===
The channel was first launched in Spain on June 12, 2006 as a free-to-air channel, called Sony Entertainment Television en Veo (or SET en Veo). It began its test broadcasts 12 hours a day, timesharing with Veo Televisión, and broadcasting fiction series and movies. It also broadcast the 58th Primetime Emmy Awards for the first time on DTT.

On September 18, the channel began broadcasting 24 hours a day.

On March 17, 2007, the network announced the broadcast of Desperate Housewives, and starting on April 14, Lost.

On August 14, 2009, Sony Pictures announced an agreement with Dahlia for the marketing of the AXN channel as a subscription-based DTT channel, waiting for Grupo Antena 3 and Mediaset España to launch their DTT payment platforms. Finally, on May 1, 2010, it ceased its free-to-air broadcasts to make way for AXN, which broadcast through paid DTT.

However, Sony TV continued to be broadcast as a pay TV channel since October 30 of the same year, rebranding as Sony Entertainment Television.

=== As AXN White ===
On April 16, 2012, it was announces that Sony TV channel would be replaced with AXN White on May 7, 2012, it mainly broadcast romance and comedy movies and series.

=== As AXN Movies ===
The channel was rebranded on May 1, 2023 to AXN Movies and changed its programming, by only broadcasting movies, embracing all genres.

== Gallery ==
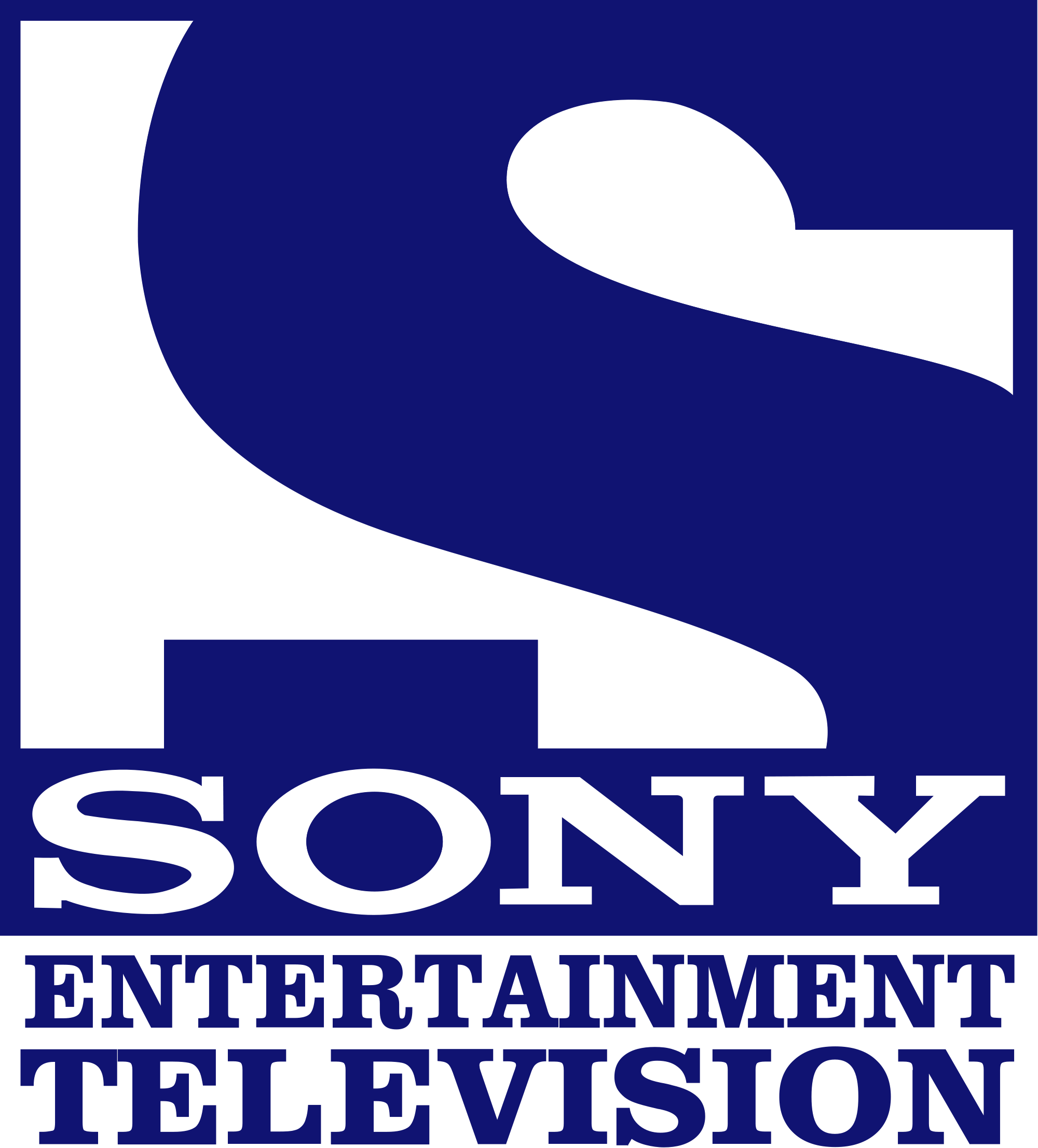
Sony Entertainment Television Logo used from 2006 up to 2012

AXN White Logo used from 2012 up to 2015

AXN White Logo used from 2015 up to 2023

AXN Movies Logo used from 2023

== Programming ==
When the channel launched as SET/AXN White, it mainly broadcast romance and comedy movies and series. However, with the rebranding to AXN Movies, its focus was redirected to only movies.

=== Former Programming ===
Sources:

- 8 Simple Rules
- Almost Perfect
- The Amazing Race
- Baby Daddy
- Becker
- Call the Midwife
- Cashmere Mafia
- Community
- Desperate Housewives
- Devious Maids
- Drop Dead Diva
- Ed
- Edel & Starck
- Family Law
- The Firm
- Franklin & Bash
- The Fosters
- Frasier
- GCB
- Happy Family
- Hart of Dixie
- Hidden Hills
- Hollywood Is Like High School with Money
- Home Improvement
- Hot in Cleveland
- In Plain Sight
- Jesse
- Judging Amy
- Kevin Hill
- Las Vegas
- Less Than Kind
- Lost Girl
- Mad About You
- Make It or Break It
- Malcolm & Eddie
- Married... with Children
- McLeod's Daughters
- Medium
- Melissa & Joey
- Mike & Molly
- Missing
- Mistresses
- Mixology
- Mr. Sunshine
- Naked Josh
- The Nanny
- No Ordinary Family
- Off the Map
- Offspring
- Once Upon a Time
- Packed to the Rafters
- Pretty Little Liars
- Private
- Relic Hunter
- Satisfaction
- Scoundrels
- SeaQuest DSV
- Shit My Dad Says
- Smash
- Suddenly Susan
- Sue Thomas: F.B.Eye
- Switched at Birth
- Torchwood
- Veronica's Closet
- Veronica Mars
- Weeds
- Will & Grace
