= MOV (TV channel) =

- Broadcast area: Portugal; Angola; Mozambique; Cape Verde
- Headquarters: Lisbon, Portugal

Programming
- Picture format: 16:9 576i (SDTV); 16:9 1080i (HDTV)

Ownership
- Owner: Dreamia (AMC/NOS)
- Sister channels: Canal Panda; Biggs; Canal Hollywood

History
- Launched: 1 December 2007; 18 years ago
- Closed: 31 March 2017; 8 years ago

Links
- Website: www.canalmov.pt

MOV was a Portuguese basic cable and satellite television channel operated by Dreamia SLU, a joint venture between AMC Networks International Iberia and NOS. MOV was launched on December 1, 2007, by NOS, then Zon TV Cabo, and aired mainly TV series and movies. Later, Dreamia started a joint venture with AMC, in order to increase the channel's programming library, with new TV series and films.

On May 21, 2008, MOV did a major rebranding, including simulcasting in HD. Along with corporate sibling SportTV, MOV premiered idents, continuity and imagery produced by Red Bee Media.

The channel ended its broadcasts on March 31, 2017.
