= TVCine =

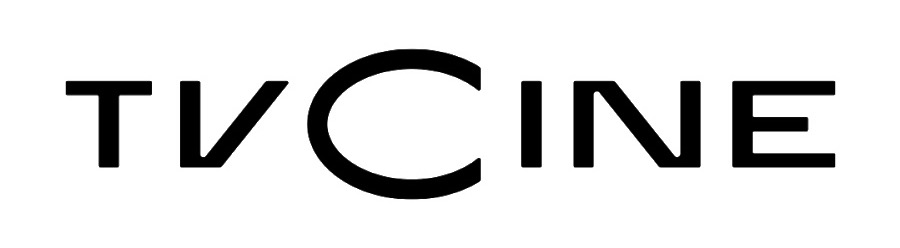
- Country: Portugal
- Broadcast area: Portugal; Angola; Mozambique; Cape Verde

Programming
- Picture format: 576i 16:9; TVCine Top; TVCine Edition; TVCine Emotion; TVCine Action; TVCine Power; 1080i 16:9; TVCine Top HD; TVCine Edition HD; TVCine Emotion HD; TVCine Action HD; TVCine Power HD

Ownership
- Owner: NOS

History
- Launched: 1998
- Former names: Telecine (1998-2003); Canais Lusomundo (2003-2007)

Links
- Website: www.tvcine.pt

TVCine is a Portuguese premium television brand used on four movie channels, operated by NOS. They showcase recent movies and premieres from all the major studios, as well as comedy, action, classic and old movies.

== History ==
TVCine originally began life as a Portuguese version of the Brazilian premium channels Telecine in 1998, only consisting of two channels at the time. One dedicated to more recent films, Telecine 1, while the other was dedicated to older films, Telecine 2. The two channels airesd 1,200 titles, a quarter of which (300) were premmieres. On June 1, 2001, Telecine 1 was renamed Telecine Premium and Telecine 2, Telecine Gallery. Ahead of the change, the two channels had 140,000 subscribers, a number that Premium TV thought was "above expectations". On August 23, 2002, it opened an online store, where subscribers could buy up to four DVD releases a month.

The channels were eventually fully acquired by the theatrical Portuguese distributor Cinemas Lusomundo (now NOS Audiovisuais) and on 1 June 2003 the channels were rebranded as Canais Lusomundo. Telecine 1 became Lusomundo Premium and Telecine 2 became Lusomundo Gallery. With this change, the channels were now produced entirely in Portugal, which also included 35mm, a magazine program about news from the movie world, as well as more up-to-date premieres of the latest titles.

On April 16, 2004, a third channel was launched as Lusomundo Action dedicated to action and horror movies. Most titles seen were from the second half of the 90s. Large-scale action movies continued to premiere on Lusomundo Premium.

In 2005 a fourth channel was added as Lusomundo Happy, dedicated to movies that were more family friendly and more emotional. Following the launch of Fox and Fox Life on TV Cabo, Lusomundo signed a contract with 20th Century Fox, valid from June 2005. With these developments, TV Cabo claimed that the ensemble of the Lusomundo channels had an estimated 250,000 to 270,000 subscribers.

The TVCine brand was launched on 1 November 2007, replacing the Lusomundo branding of the channels. In May 2009 they started to broadcast in 16:9 24-hours a day, instead of the old 4:3 format.

As of 1 September 2015 TVSéries has granted HBO series exclusivity in Portugal and has adopted "Home of HBO" as its tagline, until the closure of the channel on 14 January 2020 following the launch of HBO Portugal, which would eventually become HBO Max.

ERC received a request for a TVCine Fear channel on April 8, 2025.

== Channels ==
Channel name	Logo	Channel number			Genres	Format		Previous name
TVCine Top		Nos 75	Meo 55	Zap 50	Latest Releases, Cinema Releases, Premieres Cinema	16:9 SDTV	16:9 HDTV	Replaced Lusomundo Premium, and more recently TVCine 1
TVCine Edition		Nos 76	Meo 56	Zap 51	Cult Cinema, Documentaries, Shorts, Portuguese Cinema, Classics	16:9 SDTV	16:9 HDTV	Replaced Lusomundo Action, and more recently TVCine 2
TVCine Emotion		Nos 77	Meo 57	Zap 52	Animation, Drama, Romance, Comedy	16:9 SDTV	16:9 HDTV	Replaced Lusomundo Happy, and more recently TVCine 3
TVCine Action		Nos 78	Meo 58	Zap 53	Action, Thriller, Sci-fi, Horror	16:9 SDTV	16:9 HDTV	Replaced Lusomundo Gallery, TVCine, and more recently TVCine 4
TVCine Power				Zap 70	Adventure, African Cinema, Blockbusters Cinema, dubbed movies	16:9 SDTV	16:9 HDTV	N/A; New channel for Angola and Mozambique

== Former channels (on 14th January 2020) ==
- TVSéries
- TVSéries HD
