= Porto Canal =

Portuguese TV channel

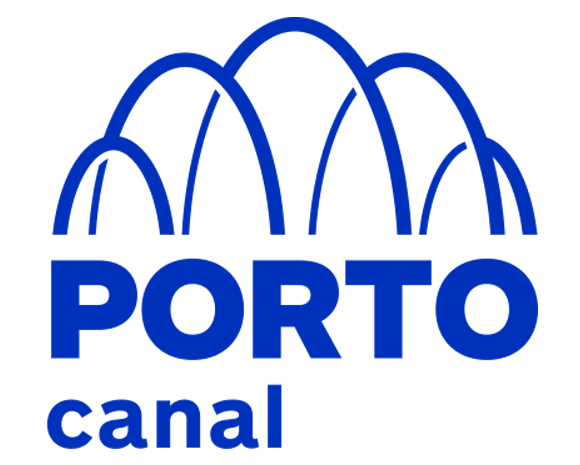
- Country: Portugal
- Broadcast area: Portugal; Angola; Mozambique
- Headquarters: Matosinhos

Programming
- Picture format: 1080i HDTV (downscaled to 16:9 576i for the SDTV feed)

Ownership
- Owner: FC Porto

History
- Launched: September 29, 2006

Links
- Website: portocanal.pt

Porto Canal is a Portuguese pay television channel broadcasting from northern Portugal based in Matosinhos. Launched on 29 September 2006, it serves a spiritual successor of NTV (from Porto TV, based in Vila Nova de Gaia), which broadcast between 2001 and 2004 and was replaced by RTPN, Radiotelevisão Portuguesa's news channel.

In 2011, it entered into a partnership with FC Porto and has, ever since, operated as a general regional channel with a strong emphasis on the club’s activities.

== History ==
The creation of Porto Canal was first mooted in June 2004, shortly after the former NTV was retooled into RTPN. The channel was led by NTV's former administrator Bruno de Carvalho, in association with executives from two local production companies: Daniel Deusdado from Farol de Ideias and José Miguel Cadilhe from Filbox.

On November 1, 2006, the channel started broadcasting on analog, and began broadcasting a 24-hour schedule.

In July 2010, Porto Canal launched three new delegations in Mirandela, Arcos de Valdevez and Penafiel, and in the beginning of 2011, three more in Guimarães, Braga and Vila Real.

In March 2011, Porto Canal announced a partnership with Portuguese sports club FC Porto. In August 2011, FC Porto assumed the management of Porto Canal, launching two new FC Porto related programs, Flash Porto and Somos Porto. Porto Canal also broadcasts live full matches of the FC Porto teams of football (only FC Porto B home games), basketball, handball, roller hockey, futsal, women's football and women's volleyball.

In June 2019, FC Porto was sentenced to pay a €2 million fine for publishing and manipulating illegally obtained Benfica emails on Porto Canal. Related to that, in June 2023, the club's director of communication, Francisco J. Marques, was sentenced to a ten-month suspended prison sentence for aggravated violation of private correspondence or telecommunications and to a one-year and two months suspended prison sentence for offense to a collective person. Porto Canal's contents director, Diogo Faria, received a nine-month suspended prison sentence for violation of private correspondence or telecommunications. Both persons were also sentenced to pay a €10,000 compensation to Luís Filipe Vieira. Júlio Magalhães, the channel's former director, was absolved of all accusations.

On November 26, 2025, ERC approved the conversion from a generalist channel to a sports channel, with the conversion taking place in January 2026. The channel announced that it would cease having its generalist output because of decreasing ratings and lack of revenue, making the existing model unsustainable. In conjunction, it was announced that it would leave Senhora da Hora, where the channel has been since its inception, and move all of its operations to Estádio do Dragão. Some of its former staff had left to other channels and media outlets in the wake of the decision.

== Programming ==
In terms of content the channel airs generalist and regional programming. It focuses primarily on news of the northern region of Portugal, having also many diverse programs.

Since the partnership with FC Porto, it has programs like Flash Porto or 45 Minutos à Porto that broadcast club-related news and information.

=== Major programs (non-sports) ===
- À Conversa com Ricardo Couto
- Caminhos da História
- Cinema Batalha
- Clube de Cozinheiros
- Consultório
- Destino Norte
- Jornal Diário
- Mentes que Brilham
- Net Diário
- Notícias às 17
- Notícias às 18
- Notícias às 19
- Pólo Norte
- Parlamento da Região
- Ponto Cardeais
- Porto Alive!
- Radioativo
- Saúde no Tacho
- Territórios
- Testemunho Directo
- Último Jornal
- Valter Hugo Mãe

=== Sports programs (FC Porto) ===
- Azul e Branco
- Cadeira de Sonho
- Especial Porto
- Dragão Caixa
- Dragon Force
- Flash Porto
- Invictos
- Portistas pelo Mundo
- Somos Porto
- 45 Minutos à Porto
