= Vodafone Portugal =

Portuguese telecommunications company

- Type: Subsidiary
- Industry: Telecommunications
- Predecessor: Telecel
- Founded: 18 October 1992; 34 years ago
- Headquarters: Avenida D. João II, 1.04.01, Parque das Nações, Lisbon, Portugal
- Area served: Portugal
- Key people: Luís Lopes (CEO)
- Products: Mobile Networks; Mobile broadband Telecom Services; IPTV/Cable television
- Revenue: ▼€1,341.7 million (2010)
- Operating income: ▼€301.5 million (2010)
- Net income: ▼€214.2 million (2010)
- Number of employees: 1,400 (2024)
- Parent: Vodafone Group Plc
- Subsidiaries: Sport TV (25%)
- Website: www.vodafone.pt

The previous Telecel brand

Vodafone Portugal – Comunicações Pessoais, S.A., a full subsidiary of Vodafone Group Plc, is the second mobile operator in Portugal, both chronologically and in market share (34% in 2006). Its competitors are NOS and MEO.

== History ==
=== As Telecel ===
Vodafone Portugal was founded in 1991 as Telecel, Comunicações Pessoais, S.A. (Telecel). In June 1991, Telecel and TMN applied for licences to operate GSM mobile networks in Portugal, and Telecel won the bid for the second GSM network in October that year.

The network went live on 18 October 1992.

In 1996, the "pre-paid" concept was introduced with the launch of the tariff plan Vitamina. Telecel also held a paging license and was leader in the 4-player paging business, using the brand Telechamada.

In January 2000, the indirect access fixed-line telephone service was launched, using Portugal Telecom's infrastructures and the 1091 prefix. It used the brands toq 1091 (for home customers; now discontinued in favour of Vodafone at Home/Vodafone Casa) and Voz Pri (for business customers; still used as part of the business solutions).

In May of the same year, Telecel entered the Internet service provider and web portal businesses under the brand Netc (pronounced "netcetera"). The business model was lifted from successful Freeserve, a British non-subscription ISP.

=== From Telecel to Vodafone ===
The initial group of shareholders was led by Portuguese investment bank Banco Espírito Santo, Portuguese conglomerate Amorim and USA's Pacific Telesis, owner of mobile operator PacTel Cellular.

PacTel Cellular was spun off in 1994 as AirTouch, which in turn merged in 1999 with British operator Vodafone. Thus, Telecel became minority-owned by the Vodafone Group.

Telecel was listed on the Euronext-Lisbon Stock Exchange. Banco Espírito Santo and Amorim used the IPO and subsequent sales to sell out with considerable gains, and the Vodafone Group eventually took a controlling share.

In 2003, the Vodafone Group launched a successful tender offer for all outstanding shares not in its possession, thus becoming the full owner of then-called Telecel-Vodafone. The company was definitely renamed Vodafone Portugal and delisted.

The CEO since the beginning was António Carrapatoso, until 2012. Then Mário Vaz until 2023. The current CEO is Luís Lopes.

=== As Vodafone ===
In 2002, when Telecel was already controlled by the Vodafone Group, the parent company decided to implement the Vodafone brand worldwide, in order to achieve synergies and improve brand awareness. Telecel was the first operator to initiate the process. This was achieved in three steps: 1. putting Vodafone after Telecel, thus referring to the company as Telecel Vodafone; 2. after six months, exchanging the order to Vodafone Telecel; and 3. after another six months (already in 2003), dropping the Telecel brand altogether. Throughout the process, market research showed no confusion and no loss of awareness of both the brands and the operator. This had been a concern for Vodafone for Telecel was a top-ten advertiser, which had led to develop a brand with the highest recall indexes.

In 2002, the Netc ISP and web portal were rebranded Vizzavi, Vodafone's multimedia brand in association with Vivendi Universal.

In 2003, when paging was moribund as mobile phones had become so ubiquitous, the Telechamada business was abandoned and the license was returned to the State.

In 2003, the Vizzavi ISP business was sold to competitor IOL, a unit of Portuguese media group Media Capital, and the web portal was closed down as Vodafone live! was launched.

In 2006, Vodafone Portugal disconnected the Cell Broadcast service.

In August 2007, Vodafone Portugal launches Duplex ADSL service with ADSL2+ technology.

In September 2009, Vodafone Portugal launches Vodafone Casa TV an IPTV service.

In June 2010, Vodafone Portugal launches fibre FTTH offer with television and Internet at speeds up to 300 Mbit/s.

In July 2015, Vodafone Portugal starts offering a 4K (Ultra HD) television channel to its TV-over-fibre customers. Vodafone Portugal is also the first European operator to reach speeds of 600 Mbit/s on its mobile network, using the new functions offered by the evolution of 4G+ (LTE-Advanced) mobile internet technology.

In September 2015, Vodafone Portugal becomes the first TV operator in the world to launch a service for smart watches. Customers of Vodafone's TV service are now able to watch TV channels live on their wrists. Vodafone Portugal starts offering VoLTE and is the first operator in Portugal to offer VoLTE, the most advanced 4G voice technology.

== Figures ==
Like parent company, Vodafone Portugal's fiscal year runs from April to March.

Results 2Q06:

- 4,366,000 clients, of which:
  - 79.6% pre-paid, Average revenue per user 13 euro
  - 21.4% post-paid, Average revenue per user 62.20 euro
- Increase of 5.8% in revenues relative to 2Q05.

== See also ==
- Vodafone FM, a defunct Portuguese radio station
