= AXN White =

European television channel

- Broadcast area: Portugal; Andorra; Equatorial Guinea; Angola; Mozambique; Poland; Romania; Czech Republic; Slovakia; Bulgaria

Programming
- Picture format: 1080i HDTV

Ownership
- Owner: Sony Pictures Television International Networks Europe
- Sister channels: AXN; AXN Black; AXN Spin

History
- Launched: 14 April 2012; 14 years ago (Portugal); 7 May 2012; 14 years ago (Spain); 1 October 2013; 12 years ago (Central Europe)
- Replaced: AXN Crime (Central Europe)
- Closed: 2 October 2017; 8 years ago (Hungary); 1 May 2023; 3 years ago (Spain)
- Replaced by: Sony Max (Hungary); AXN Movies (Spain)
- Former names: Sony Entertainment Television (Spain and Portugal)

Links
- Website: http://www.axnwhite.com

AXN White is a channel operated by Sony Pictures Television International Networks Europe. Its programming is focused on comedy and romantic television series and movies. The channel was launched in Portugal on 14 April 2012 and in Spain on 7 May 2012 replacing Sony Entertainment Television. The channel replaced AXN Crime on 1 October 2013 in Hungary, Poland, Romania, the Czech Republic, Slovakia, Bulgaria and Moldova.

On October 3, 2017, the channel was replaced by Sony Max in Hungary. On May 1, 2023, the channel was replaced by AXN Movies in Spain. On 1 September 2023, German channel Sony Channel was renamed as AXN White.

== Gallery ==
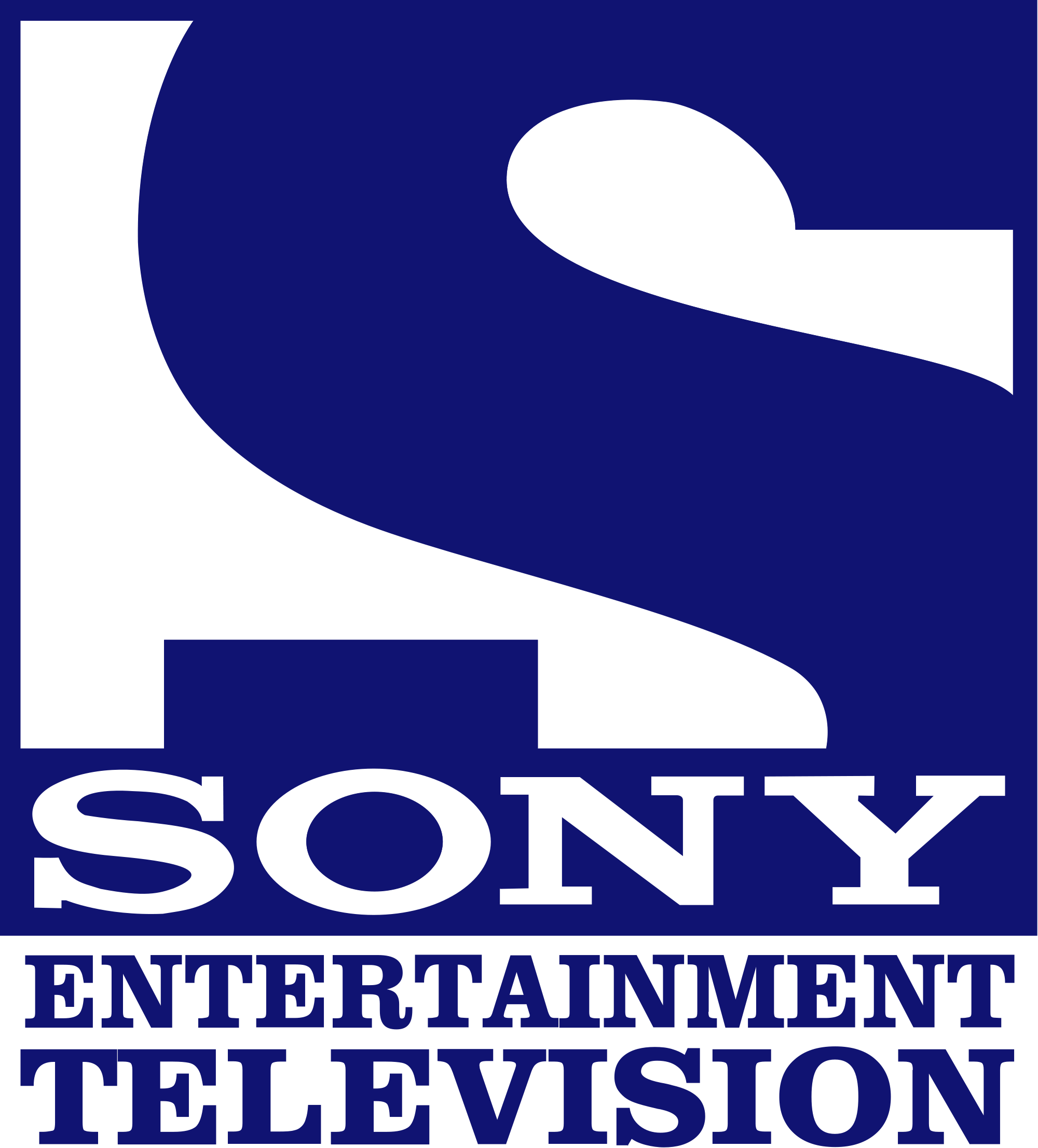
Former Logo as Sony Entertainment Television in Spain and Portugal

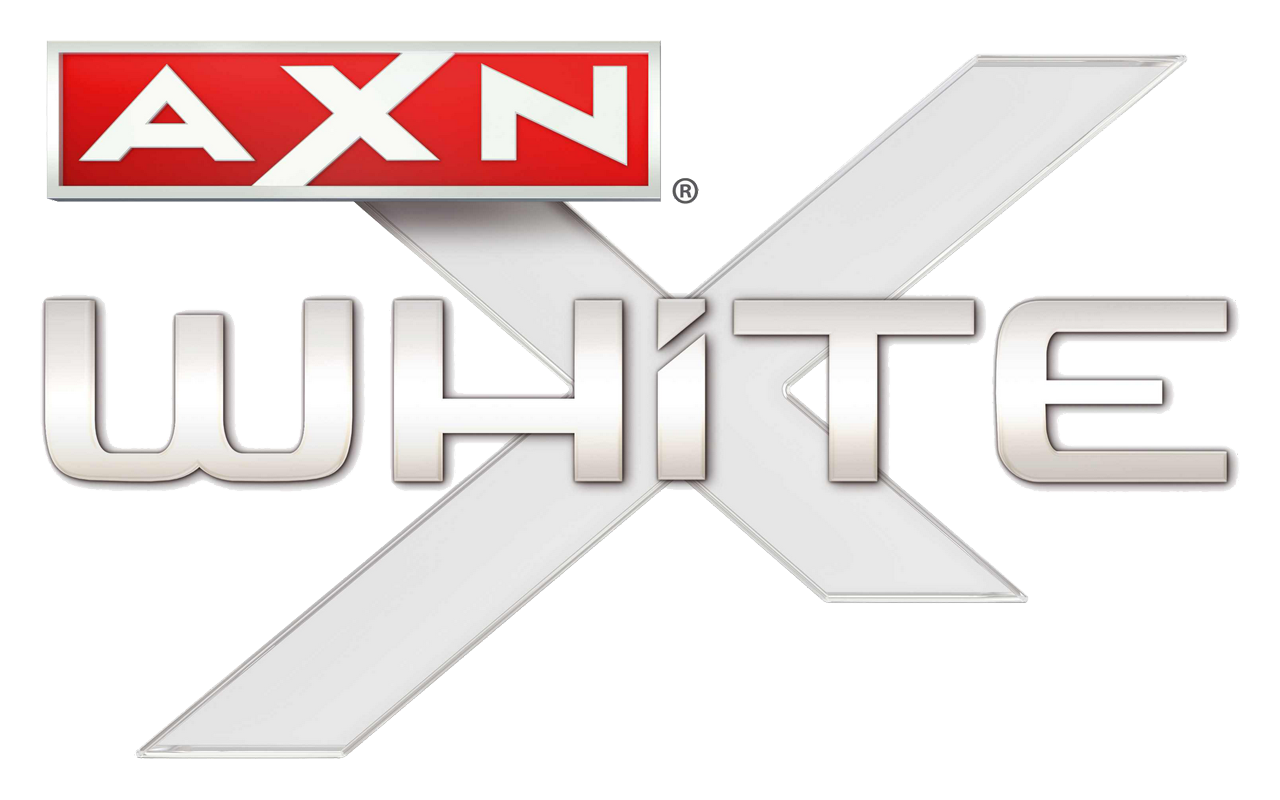
Logo used from 2012 to 2015 (some countries 2016)

Logo used in 2015 (some countries 2016).

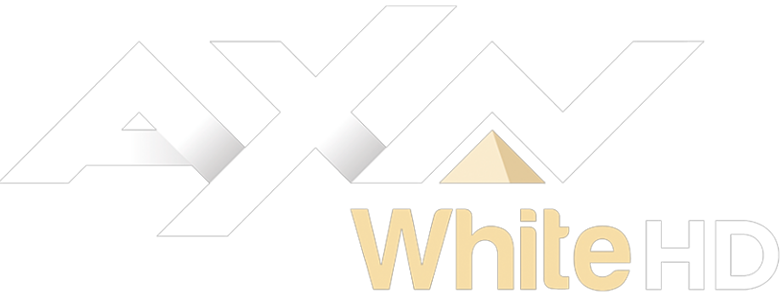
HD

== Programming ==
=== Current Programming ===
==== Portugal ====
- Candice Renoir
- Chesapeake Shores
- Family Law
- The Good Karma Hospital
- Il paradiso delle signore
- The Tudors
- Unforgettable

==== Poland ====
- Chicago Med
- Colin and Justin's Home Heist
- Doc – Nelle tue mani
- Léo Matteï, Brigade des mineurs
- Profilage
- Salvage Hunters
- Ultraviolet
- Znaki
- Zbrodnia

==== Central Europe ====
- Brousko
- Colin and Justin's Home Heist
- The Good Doctor
- Kafe Tis Haras
- Profilage
- The Rookie

=== Former Programming ===
- All Saints
- Almost Perfect (on AXN White Spain)
- Acil Ask Araniyor (on AXN White Central Europe)
- The Amazing Race (on AXN White Spain)
- Baby Daddy (on AXN White Spain and Portugal)
- The Bachelor (on AXN White Portugal)
- The Big Bang Theory (on AXN White Portugal)
- Burden Of Truth (on AXN White Central Europe)
- Call the Midwife (on AXN White Spain and Portugal)
- Carpoolers
- Cashmere Mafia (on AXN White Spain)
- C'est l'amour mon amour (on AXN White Poland)
- Charmed (on AXN White Portugal)
- The Client List (on AXN White Poland, Central Europe and Portugal)
- Comedians in Cars Getting Coffee (on AXN White Portugal)
- Community (on AXN White Spain and Portugal)
- Cougar Town (on AXN White Portugal)
- Crossing Jordan (on AXN White Poland and Central Europe)
- Carter (on AXN White Central Europe)
- Dawson's Creek (on AXN White Portugal)
- Der Fürst und das Mädchen (on AXN White Poland and Central Europe)
- Devious Maids (on AXN White Spain and Portugal)
- Diagnosis. Murder (on AXN White Central Europe)
- Drop Dead Diva (on AXN White Spain)
- Designated Survivor (on AXN White Central Europe)
- Ed (on AXN White Spain and Portugal)
- Edel & Starck (on AXN White Spain)
- Everybody Loves Raymond (on AXN White Portugal)
- Family Law (on AXN White Spain)
- The Firm (on AXN White Spain)
- Franklin & Bash (on AXN White Spain and Portugal)
- The Fosters (on AXN White Spain and Portugal)
- Frasier (on AXN White Spain)
- GCB (on AXN White Spain and Portugal)
- Gossip Girl (on AXN White Poland and Portugal)
- The Guardian
- Happy Family (on AXN White Spain)
- Hart of Dixie (on AXN White Spain and Portugal)
- Haven
- Hawthorne (on AXN White Poland and Portugal)
- Heartland (on AXN White Poland and Central Europe)
- Hollywood Is Like High School with Money (on AXN White Spain)
- Hot in Cleveland (on AXN White Spain and Portugal)
- House (on AXN White Poland)
- How to Get Away with Murder
- Incantesimo (on AXN White Central Europe)
- In Case of Emergency
- In Plain Sight (on AXN White Spain)
- Intikam (on AXN White Central Europe)
- Joan of Arcadia
- Judging Amy
- Kommissar Rex (on AXN White Central Europe)
- Las Vegas (on AXN White Spain and Portugal)
- Lasko (on AXN White Portugal)
- Less Than Kind (on AXN White Spain)
- Lignes de vie (on AXN White Central Europe)
- Lincoln Heights
- Lost Girl (on AXN White Spain)
- Make It or Break It (on AXN White Spain and Portugal)
- McLeod's Daughters
- Medium (on AXN White Spain Portugal & Central Europe)
- Melissa & Joey (on AXN White Spain and Portugal)
- Men at Work (on AXN White Portugal)
- The Mentalist
- Miracles
- Missing (on AXN White Spain, Poland and Central Europe)
- Mistresses (on AXN White Spain and Portugal)
- Mixology (on AXN White Spain and Portugal)
- Mr. Sunshine (on AXN White Spain)
- Murder, She Wrote (on AXN White Poland and Central Europe)
- Naked Josh (on AXN White Spain)
- No Ordinary Family (on AXN White Spain and Portugal)
- Off the Map (on AXN White Spain)
- Offspring (on AXN White Spain and Portugal)
- Once Upon a Time (on AXN White Spain and Portugal)
- One Tree Hill
- Packed to the Rafters (on AXN White Spain)
- The Paradise (on AXN White Poland and Central Europe)
- Parks and Recreation (on AXN White Portugal)
- Party of Five (on AXN White Portugal)
- Pretty Little Liars (on AXN White Spain and Portugal)
- Privileged
- Private (on AXN White Spain and Portugal)
- Private Practice
- Relic Hunter
- Royal Pains (on AXN White Portugal)
- Rules of Engagement (on AXN White Portugal)
- Ransom (on AXN White Central Europe)
- Sabrina, the Teenage Witch
- Satisfaction (on AXN White Spain)
- Scandal
- Scoundrels (on AXN White Spain)
- The Secret Life of the American Teenager (on AXN White Portugal)
- Sense and Sensibility (on AXN White Poland and Central Europe)
- Sex and the City (on AXN White Portugal)
- Sherlock (on AXN White Central Europe)
- Shit My Dad Says (on AXN White Spain)
- Smash (on AXN White Spain and Portugal)
- Station 19
- Suburgatory (on AXN White Portugal)
- Sue Thomas: F.B.Eye (on AXN White Poland and Central Europe)
- Switched at Birth (on AXN White Spain and Portugal)
- Terra ribelle (on AXN White Poland and Central Europe)
- Top Chef
- Two and a Half Men (on AXN White Portugal)
- Una grande famiglia (on AXN White Poland and Central Europe)
- Unsolved Mysteries
- Upstairs Downstairs (on AXN White Poland and Central Europe)
- Veronica Mars (on AXN White Spain)
- Weeds (on AXN White Spain)
- The West Wing
- Will & Grace (on AXN White Spain)
- Young Sheldon
- Zbrodnia (on AXN White Central Europe)
