= Autoridade Nacional de Comunicações =

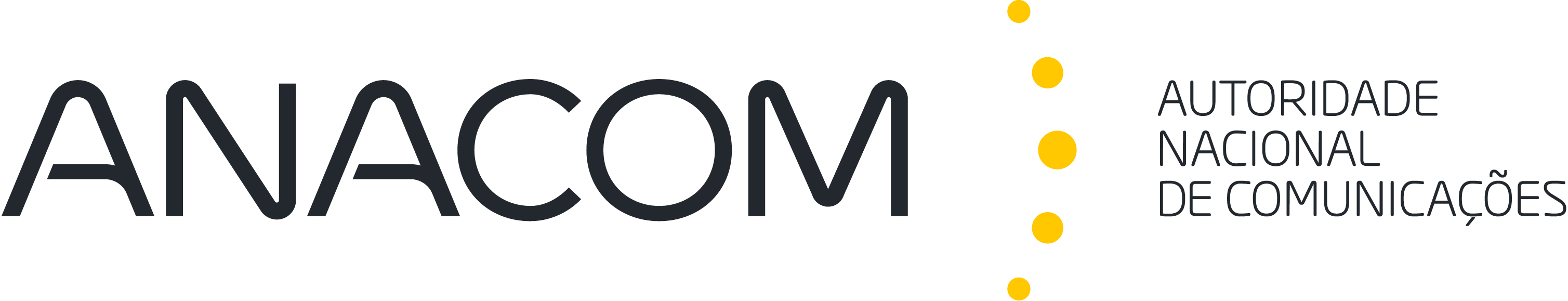

Organization
- Legal nature: Regulatory authority
- Assignments: Regulation, supervision and representation of the electronic communications and postal sector
- Dependency: Governo de Portugal Ministérios das Infraestruturas e Habitação
- Chairwoman: Sandra Maximiano

Local
- Jurisdiction: Portugal
- Head Office: Lisboa

History
- Formed: 1989 ^{[1]}

Website
- www.anacom.pt

Footnotes
- (1) as the Instituto das Comunicações de Portugal

Autoridade Nacional de Comunicações (ANACOM) is Portugal's national regulatory authority for the communications sector, for the purposes of relevant Community and national legislation, including electronic communications and postal services. ANACOM also advises and assists the Portuguese Government in sector matters, while retaining its status as an independent administrative entity, with administrative, financial and management autonomy and its own assets.

ANACOM's main tasks are to promote competition in the provision of communications networks and services, ensure transparency in prices and in the conditions governing the use of services and provide efficient management of the radio spectrum. ANACOM is also responsible for supporting the development of markets and of electronic and postal communications networks, for protecting the rights and interests of citizens, and providing Portuguese representation at international bodies relevant to the sector.

ANACOM has its origins in Instituto das Comunicações de Portugal (ICP), which began its activity in 1989 and changed its name to ICP - Autoridade Nacional de Comunicações (ICP-ANACOM) in 2002. The current statutes of ANACOM entered into force in 2015, following approval of the Framework Law of Regulatory Bodies (Framework law for independent administrative entities with functions regulating the economic activity of the private, public and cooperative sector).

The Chair of ANACOM's Board of Directors is Sandra Maximiano (appointed in December 2023). The Board of Directors is also composed by Patrícia Gonçalves and Manuel Cabugueira.

== Prior Presidents ==
- Fernando Mendes
- Luís Nazaré
- Álvaro Dâmaso
- Pedro Duarte Neves
- José Manuel Amado da Silva
- Fátima Barros
- João Cadete de Matos
