= Nowo =

Portuguese telecommunications company

NOWO
- Formerly: Cabovisão (1993-2016)
- Company type: Sociedade Anónima
- Industry: Telecommunications
- Founded: 27 September 1993 (as Cabovisão); 19 September 2016 (as NOWO)
- Headquarters: Lisbon, Portugal
- Products: Landline, mobile, broadband, television
- Total assets: 7
- Parent: Digi Communications
- Website: www.nowo.pt

NOWO (pronounced "novo", meaning 'new') is a Portuguese telecommunications company. It is one of the four triple play operators in Portugal along with MEO, NOS and Vodafone. NOWO belongs to the Romanian company Digi Communications.

NOWO has mobile, 4G and wired telecommunication. It has a fiber optic network of around 14,000 km (~8,700 mi), covering more than 70 municipalities and 200 parishes in Portugal.

== History ==
Cabovisão was formed on September 27, 1993, having started operating in 2023.

In 2006, Cabovisão was fully controlled by the Dutch company Telemax BV, a division of the Canadian operator Cable Satisfaction International and which in turn was controlled by the firm Catalyst Capital. In that year it was already considered the second largest cable network operator in the country, having reached a turnover of around 129 million Euros in 2005. despite not yet fully covering the national territory, being limited mainly to the regions of Alentejo, Beiras and the corridor between Lisbon and Palmela. Despite this, it was considered that the company had great economic potential, due to the strong growth of the market for triple telephone, internet and television services, which is why large national organizations, such as Sonae, were interested in acquiring the company. However, in 2006 it ended up being purchased by a Canadian company, Cogeco, for 465 million euros.

In 2010, the Cabovisão network reached around nine hundred thousand homes, providing more than eight hundred thousand television, telephone and internet services. It was also the first operator to launch important international channels in Portugal, such as MGM, AXN, Record and FOX.

In November 2011, Público newspaper reported that since the middle of that year, messages began to be sent to various entities that might be interested in acquiring Cabovisão, something that was denied by both the operator itself and Cogeco. According to the newspaper, the financial situation of the Portuguese operator was weakened by the introduction of a new competitor, ZON, formed in 2007 from a division of Portugal Telecom. A considerable part of Cabovisão's customers migrated to ZON, leading to fears that the operator would become a victim of strong competition in the national telecommunications market, as had recently happened with AR Telecom.

In February 2012, it was acquired by the Altice group, for a value of 45 million Euros.

However, in September 2015, Altice sold Cabovisão and ONI to Apax França, a high-risk fund manager, measure that it was forced to take by the European Union, since that company had also acquired the PT group, which owned the operator MEO.

On September 13, 2016, the company's new identity and strategy was presented, which from that date was renamed NOWO. The company NOWO is the result of the rebranding of Cabovisão in September 2016. Apax France and Fortino Capital have been shareholders of NOWO since 2015, which also own in Portugal the telecommunications company ONI, that addresses the business market.

In August 2019, the Spanish company MásMovil purchased Cabonitel, which owns NOWO and Oni. In October of that year, the Competition Authority authorized the Spaniards from MásMovil and the GAEA Inversión fund to proceed with the purchase of Cabonitel, which owns the company NOWO and Oni.

In September 2022, Vodafone Portugal announced the acquisition of the NOWO, through an agreement with Lorca JVCO Limited. The ANACOM's did not approve the purchase of NOWO by Vodafone Portugal, which has to present new remedies or give up the operation.

In August 2024, Digi Communications entered into a share purchase agreement with LORCA JVCO Limited for the acquisition of 100% of the shares issued by Cabonitel, S.A. at a valuation of EUR 150 million, subject to customary adjustments and certain contingent events".
