= AXN (Portuguese TV channel) =

- Country: Spain
- Broadcast area: Portugal; Angola; Mozambique

Programming
- Picture format: 1080i HDTV (downscaled to 16:9 576i for the SDTV feed)

Ownership
- Owner: Sony Pictures Television
- Sister channels: AXN Movies; AXN White

History
- Launched: November 5, 2002; 23 years ago

Links
- Website: http://www.axn.pt/

AXN is a Portuguese pay television channel. It is the Portuguese version of the AXN network, owned by Sony. It was a Cabovisão exclusive in its beginnings, but now it is available in all operators and platforms. It's one of the most watched channels on pay-TV in Portugal, competing with Star Channel, SIC Notícias, Canal Panda, Disney Channel, Cartoon Network and Canal Hollywood.

The channel has a feed airing dubbed shows in Angola and Mozambique on the ZAP platform since 2015.

== History ==
AXN started broadcasting on Cabovisão's basic package on 1 November 2002. On 19 May 2004, the channel started broadcasting on TV Cabo, causing the channel to have a record increase in its ratings in 2005, even surpassing SIC Notícias.

The arrival to TV Cabo implied, in late 2004, a more generalist turn to its schedule, with the inclusion of the Michael Moore documentary series The Awful Truth, starting in November of that year, as well as a documentary on Carlos Sória, who climbed the K2 mountain, set for 26 December.

== Sister channels ==
=== AXN White ===
AXN White first launched in Portugal on 14 April 2012, replacing Sony Entertainment Television. It focuses on comedy and romantic series and movies.

=== AXN Movies ===
AXN Movies was launched on 17 February 2020 replacing AXN Black. It is dedicated to movies, in particular movies owned by Sony Pictures. The channel was initially exclusive to Portugal, until 2023 where it was launched in Spain.

=== Former channels ===
==== Sony Entertainment Television ====
Sony Entertainment Television was launched on 12 April 2008 in Portugal. SET was replaced by AXN White on 14 April 2012 at 8 hours, followed by SET Spain replaced by AXN White on 7 May 2012.

==== Animax ====
A weekend Animax block was added to AXN on 20 October 2007, which ended in September 2008. It was launched as a full channel on 12 April 2008. Dedicated to anime, Animax added live-action shows in 2009. On 9 May 2011, Animax was replaced by AXN Black.

==== AXN Black ====
AXN Black was launched on 9 May, 2011, replacing Animax. The channel mainly aired action and crime movies and series, being primarily male focused, and serving as a contrast with AXN White which has a more female focus. The channel was rebranded as AXN Movies on 17 February 2020, redirecting its focus to only movies, while no longer being restricted by genres.

== Shows broadcast by AXN in Portugal ==
=== Magazines ===
- Tempo Sincro
- Insert Coin

=== Fiction ===
- Alarm for Cobra 11 – The Highway Police
- Alert: Missing Persons Unit
- Accused
- The Borgias
- Castle
- The Confession
- Criminal Minds
- CSI: Crime Scene Investigation
- CSI: Miami
- CSI: NY
- Cybill
- The Firm
- The Good Doctor
- Hannibal
- Haut Potentiel Intellectuel
- Homicide: Life on the Street
- In Plain Sight
- Lasko – Die Faust Gottes
- Las Vegas
- Law and Order: UK
- Leverage
- Lord of the Flies (TV Series)
- Memphis Beat
- The Mentalist
- Missing
- The Mob Doctor
- NCIS
- Once Upon a Time
- Perception
- The Pillars of the Earth
- Private
- Sherlock
- SWAT
- XIII: The Series
