= Vodafone live! =

Brand name

Original logo

Vodafone live! was the brand name for the multimedia portal service of mobile phone operator Vodafone, offering news content, picture messaging, instant messaging, email, and downloadable ringtones and games. The service officially launched on 24 October 2002, originally in eight countries. The first compatible phones were the Japanese Sharp GX10 and Panasonic GD87, and the Nokia 7650.

It was initially developed by Japan's J-Phone under the J-Sky brand; Vodafone acquired J-Phone in August 2001, and the J-Sky service in Japan was rebranded in line as Vodafone live! in 2003. In addition, London-based Vizzavi which provided media content was taken full control by Vodafone (previously 50% owned) in 2002 and the brand name was dropped, being integrated into Vodafone live! The service and its content are modelled largely on NTT DoCoMo's successful i-mode service.

The service was marketed extensively, using stars such as footballer David Beckham in the UK, Spain and Japan. As of May 2003 there were 1.5 million customers. In the UK market its main competing WAP portals were O2 Active and Orange World.

While the service itself could be looked at with any WAP browser, Vodafone live! handsets marketed by the company integrated the service with each handset's core functions. All handsets included a colour screen, a digital camera and the capability to send and receive email, SMS and MMS messages. Vodafone live! had an icon-driven interface that was the same on all compatible models regardless of operating system.

In December 2004, Vodafone live! with 3G services was launched.

Vodafone live! was struggling against competitors i-mode and EZweb in Japan, and in 2006, it announced that its Japanese division will be sold to SoftBank Group. Vodafone live! was replaced there by Yahoo! Keitai.

In September 2009, Vodafone 360 and Vodafone My Web were announced to replace Vodafone live!

As of 2026, Vodafone still uses live.vodafone.com in its APN settings.
