= Syfy (Portugal) =

- Country: Portugal
- Broadcast area: Portugal

Programming
- Picture format: 576i (16:9 SDTV); 1080i (HDTV)

Ownership
- Owner: NBCUniversal International Networks

History
- Launched: 6 December 2008
- Closed: October 1, 2026
- Replaced by: SciFi

Links
- Website: syfy.pt

Syfy (formerly known as Sci Fi Channel and Syfy Universal) is a Portuguese digital cable, IPTV and satellite television launched on 6 December 2008 and specializes in science fiction, fantasy, and horror shows and movies.

Syfy HD was launched on 27 April 2009 on MEO on channel 64; it is now on channel 67.

Syfy Portugal is regulated in Spain by the National Commission on Competition & Markets (CNMC).

On 1 October 2026, Syfy reverted back as SciFi.

== Programming ==
- Aftermath
- American Gothic
- Andromeda
- Battlestar Galactica
- Battlestar Galactica (2004 TV series)
- Being Human
- Buffy the Vampire Slayer
- Caprica
- Childhood's End
- Dark Matter
- Doctor Who
- Dracula
- Fact or Faked: Paranormal Files
- Falling Skies
- Flash Gordon (2007 TV series)
- Game of Thrones
- Ghost Whisperer
- Grimm
- Halcyon
- Haven
- Hercules: The Legendary Journeys
- Heroes
- Heroes Reborn
- The Invisible Man
- Knight Rider (1982 TV series)
- Knight Rider (2008 TV series)
- Legend Quest
- The Librarians
- Los Protegidos
- The Magicians
- Merlin
- Mutant X
- Painkiller Jane
- Primeval: New World
- Quantum Leap
- Sanctuary
- School Spirits
- Seaquest DSV
- Sliders
- Surface
- Tremors
- Warehouse 13
