= NOS (Portuguese company) =

Portuguese media company

NOS, SGPS S.A.
- Formerly: ZON; Optimus Telecomunicações
- Type: Sociedade Anónima
- Traded as: Euronext Lisbon: NOS
- ISIN: PTZON0AM0006
- Industry: Telecommunications, Media
- Founded: 1994; 32 years ago (as PT Multimédia); 2007; 19 years ago (spin-off from Portugal Telecom); 2008; 18 years ago (as ZON Multimédia); 2013; 13 years ago (merger with Optimus Telecomunicações); 2014; 12 years ago (as NOS)
- Defunct: 2007; 19 years ago (as PT Multimédia); 2008; 18 years ago (spin-off from Portugal Telecom); 2014; 12 years ago (as ZON Multimédia)
- Headquarters: Lisbon, Portugal
- Key people: Miguel Almeida (CEO); Isabel dos Santos (non-executive administrator)
- Products: Cable television (HFC), FTTH, broadband Internet access, landline, mobile operator, television broadcasting, film distribution, movie theater operation
- Revenue: ▲€1.59 billion (2019)
- Operating income: ▲€641 million (2019)
- Net income: ▲€143 million (2019)
- Total assets: ▲€3.088 billion (2019)
- Total equity: ▲€1 billion (2019)
- Number of employees: 1,909 (2019)
- Divisions: TVCine; Sporttv
- Subsidiaries: NOS Comunicações (100%), NOS Madeira Comunicações, S.A. (78%), NOS Açores Comunicações, S.A. (84%), NOS Audiovisuais (100%), NOS Cinemas (100%), Sport TV (25%), Dreamia (50%) and ZAP (30%)
- Website: www.nos.pt

NOS, SGPS S.A. is a Portuguese telecommunications and media company which provides mobile and fixed telephony, cable television, satellite television and internet. The company resulted from the merger in 2013 of two of the country's major telecommunications companies: Zon Multimédia (formerly known as PT Multimédia, a spun-off media arm of Portugal Telecom) and Sonae's Optimus Telecommunications,

NOS owns premium movie channels TVCine and has a 25% stake in the Sport TV television network. It also operates 6 thematic channels with Dreamia, a joint venture with AMC Networks International Southern Europe. NOS Audiovisuais (formerly ZON Lusomundo) is a home-video and cinema film distributor and operates Cinemas NOS, the largest cinema chain of Portugal.

== History ==
NOS was founded as TV Cabo in 1994, becoming the third cable operator founded in Portugal (the first was the regional Cabo TV Madeirense founded in 1992, followed by Bragatel in 1994). It obtained its license in May 1994. The first customer was connected in November 1994. Initially the channel offer consisted of thirty channels and the number of Portuguese-speaking channels was initially limited to the terrestrial channels, with the number of Portuguese-speaking channels increasing as the years went on. On September 1, 1998, the company started digital satellite broadcasts, which included an agreement with Vía Digital to carry 14 of its channels.

Travel Channel was replaced by Video Italia on January 20, 2000, as travel programming was more prominent on people+arts.

The company might be considered a Portuguese dot-com. In the PT Multimédia days, it brought Portugal Telecom SAPO (a successful web portal and search engine, sold to its parent company in 2005), Lusomundo (a successful movie distributor, movie theater operator included in the spun off company and, formerly, the owner of the Diário de Notícias newspaper and the TSF radio, which were sold to Controlinveste the same year as SAPO was sold) and several TV channels such as SportTV, CNL (now SIC Notícias) and TVCine (MOV was only created after the spin-off).

In 2006, an initial public offer by Sonaecom to PT and PT Multimédia's capital launched, causing the spin-off between PT Comunicações and PT Multimédia. The process ended on 7 November 2007, though made official the previous day, causing TV Cabo and MEO to become competing operators. Zeinal Bava, until then executive director of PT Multimédia and TMN and vice-president of the PT group, became executive director of Portugal Telecom while PT Multimédia's post was filled by Rodrigo Costa.

For the third quarter of 2007, it announced that its line-up would increase from 87 to 102 channels, among them Mov and Mov+, and the rebranding of the Lusomundo channels to TVCine. On 26 September, Fox Crime and FX were launched, followed by TV Globo Portugal and PFC on 1 October and a bumper launch of ten foreign channels aimed at immigrant communities: TV Bulgaria, Inter+, Vesti, RTR-Planeta, TVRi, Cubavisión Internacional, Bloomberg TV Spain, Phoenix CNE and Phoenix InfoNews. Out of the fifteen new channels launched during this period, over 137,000 viewers tuned in to Fox Crime, while the channel that reported the least views was Cubavisión Internacional, with just 17,800 viewers.

ZON Multimédia's original headquarters in Lisbon until 2012

On 17 January 2008, ZON announced it would acquire TVTEL, its main competitor in both cable and satellite broadcasting in Porto region. Thus, ZON was strengthening its position due to the appearance of a new significant rival, MEO from Portugal Telecom, using IPTV and satellite broadcasting systems, leaving only one other competing cable television and Internet operator in Portugal, Cabovisão. Later that month, ZON Multimédia emerges as an independent branch, in order to separate itself completely from PT. The name was approved by absolute majority at a shareholders' meeting. The company launched its ZON BOX high-definition DVR decoder in May 2008.

On 29 September 2008, ZON Multimédia announced the new mobile product ZON Mobile (MVNO), the first real quad play operator in Portugal.

In November 2008, ZON announced that it would enter the contest for the fifth channel that would be created at the same time as Digital Terrestrial Television is introduced in Portugal. The company reached 500,000 fixed telephony users in August 2019.

On 6 April 2009, it launched five new channels: AXN's HD feed, Sony Entertainment Television, Animax, Brava HDTV and Russia Today.

On 17 March 2010, ZON renamed its cable and satellite television service as ZON TV, dropping the 16-year-old TV Cabo brand.

A new decoder with a new, easy-to-use interface, IRIS, was introduced in January 2011.

On 24 October 2012, ZON changed its headquarters from the original building in Entrecampos to new instalations in Campo Grande.

In 2013, a merger with Optimus (which also included Optimus Clix, Optimus Kanguru, Optimus Tag, Smart and WTF) was approved and the company was renamed to ZON Optimus. In May 2014, the two brands ZON and Optimus were merged into one single brand, called "NOS" (which is pronounced just like "nós", the Portuguese for "we", "nodes" or "knots").) The company also became responsible for the festivals formerly sponsored by Optimus (Optimus Alive and Optimus Primavera Sound automatically gained NOS branding). From 6 February 2015, it was in charge of sponsoring the Portuguese football league, which was renamed Liga NOS for sponsorship reasons.

The company launched ESIM services on 15 April 2019.

A partnership with SL Benfica led to the first football match to be transmitted in Portugal using 5G technology on 6 May 2021.

== Shareholders ==
As of March 20, 2024:

Entity	Number of stocks	Percentage of share
Sonaecom	134.322.268	37,37%
ZOPT	134.322.269	26,07%
Mubadala Investment Company	25.758.569	5,00%
Other shareholders	165.233.758	31,56%

== See also ==
- Internet in Portugal
