= Regiões TV =

- Country: Portugal

Programming
- Language: Portuguese
- Picture format: 16:9 (720p, SDTV)

Ownership
- Owner: NexTV (TVTEL/ZON Multimédia)
- Sister channels: mvm

History
- Launched: 5 December 2008; 17 years ago
- Closed: 3 November 2020; 5 years ago

Regiões TV was a Portuguese digital cable and satellite television channel, based in Porto, which specialized in programming concerning the Portuguese regions. The channel started in 2008, but had its history tracing back to 2004. It closed down in 2020.

== Background ==
Invicta TV was a channel established in 2005 whose first test broadcasts were conducted in January 2005, with definitive broadcasts between 18 April 2006 and 3 January 2007, without having a legal Portuguese license to carry its service. Owned by Finanzza Investments, it was available exclusively on Porto cable operator TVTEL. The channel was subsequently sold to TVTEL, renamed two times (Região Norte TV and later RTV) before shutting down completely in 2020.

=== Finanzza Investments ===
The channel traces its origins to Invicta TV, which was owned by Finanzza Investments, extant in 2003, created to compete Telefonia Virtual, the first Portuguese website dedicated to radio, founded by Nuno Ribeiro in 1998, which existed until 2005.

FI presented itself as a Luso-American holding, administered by Portuguese businessman Vítor Fernandes, of Bragança, who claimed to control 95% of the shares. The headquarters were slated to be in Washington, the American capital, and in Portugal, it would own Grupo Norte Rádio e Televisão, which, according to Vítor Fernandes, would manage four local radio stations. A December 2004 Jornal de Notícias investigation revealed, however, that one of the stations was licensed to Vinhais, with little activity and without regular broadcasts. Another station was located in Sabrosa, having also a share in Rádio Nova. Other sources noted that FI was owned by Vítor Fernandes' family, in partnership with an American risk capital company, whose name was never revealed.

Although Washington was initially appointed as the location of the company's headquarters, in November 2006, Vítor Fernandes affirmed that it would be located "between Washington and New York". An investigation made by Expresso discovered that, neither in the state of New York or in Washington D.C., a company with the name "Finanzza Investments" existed, listed only in the state of Delaware. Facing this lack of congruence, Vítor Fernandes confirmed that the company was actually headquartered in Delaware, having selected the location “for personal convenience and legal reasons”. The businessman assured, however, that there would also be offices in New York and Washington, to which it never provided contacts, despite attempting to do so.

According to Vítor Fernandes, in December 2007, the company would have at least three staff in the United States: himself, Curtis Swetz and another one whose name he did not remember.

FI also owned JornalRadio.com, founded by Filipe Jorge, which annually granted an award for those to be considered the best radio websites in the country, the Oscar Jornal Rádio awards. The winner for 2003 was TSF, and in 2004, a RCI Viseu.

In December 2004, Vítor Fernandes announced that FI pretended to launch a cable television channel, whose name was not yet revealed, which proposed, according to the businessman, to have a strong informative component, also aiming to have an "interventive role related to the region", concentrating on the dissemination of cultural and scientific issues in northern Portugal.

On 29 December, Vítor Fernandes announced that he had invited SIC to take part in the project. On 7 January 2005, there was still no response from SIC's behalf.

The start of its experimental broadcasts was scheduled for mid-January 2005, with the Greater Porto audience being the first to have contact with the new project, since, in an initial phase, the channel would be available exclusively on TVTEL. TVTEL, a company with participations from Cofina, BPI and PME Capital, operated exclusively in the Greater Porto region, having in December 2004 a total of 15,000 subscribers.

Initial investment projected for its first six months on air, including the content area, would be in the order of €497,000, with the new channel being located in the Porto's industrial zone. The channel would have a news team of three presenters and six journalists. The team would also have the support of the digital system built by Norwegian company Mobbers Telelinks, specialist in the broadcast of interactive television content, and partner of several European networks, such as the French TF1, with a technological structure involving an investment of €100,000.

=== Invicta TV's test broadcasts and problems with the regulator ===
In January 2005, the channel started its first phase of test transmissions, showing a mere test card.

On 14 June, Vítor Fernandes announced that its first broadcasts were set for July, with experimental content catering topics related to the Greater Porto area, being distributed through the TVTEL operator, and with an initial five-hour line-up.

On 4 July, Vítor Fernandes, as the administrator of FI - Portugal, was visited by minister Augusto Santos Silva, to whom he presented the concept of the regional channel. According to Vítor Fernandes, the channel would be "the first true Portuguese regional channel, by genre, product and format, with programming dedicated to Greater Porto, centered on culture and people". The minister's cabinet did not inform the type of the discussion, only revealing that FI's staff was received and heard at an audit, with all operators that solicited encounters.

In August, according to declarations from the company's administrator, Invicta TV had received a non-binding opinion from Instituto da Comunicação Social (ICS), waiting for an opinion from Alta Autoridade para a Comunicação Social (AACS) to continue its experimental broadcasts. In particular, there were doubts on what was the jurisdiction to apply to the channel, since although the content and the broadcast was produced in Portugal, the owning company was headquartered in the United States of America.

A new tentative launch date set for 10 October would also fail.

On 5 November 2005, still without an answer from AACS, Vítor Fernandes issued an announcement eyeing for the launch of the channel in the next few days, accusing AACS of delaying the deliberation process on the regional channel project, giving it as responsible for its "current and future failures", as well as the delay in its full launch. According to Vítor Fernandes, the channel would not be under Portuguese jurisdiction, which would not depend on AACS's waiver to go on air.

According to Armando Torres Paulo, president of AACS, he had informed Diário de Notícias that the process would be out of his reach, in the hands of the rapporteur, suggesting that the delay could be due to possible steps taken during the process. In turn, José Garibaldi, vice-president of the organization, declared to the Lusa News Agency that the process for Invicta TV was still in appreciation phase, being early for the regulator to pronounce on the subject, clarifying that what was at stake in the process was not the opinion of the AACS, but rather whether or not the channel needed authorization to broadcast in Portugal.

On 12 November, the channel decided to continue operations showing promotional advertisements even without receiving a waiver from AACS, alleged that it wasn't necessary, since Invicta TV, owned by FI, was not under Portuguese jurisdiction, since the group did not have headquarters in Portugal.

In early February 2006, Invicta TV continued its experimental broadcasts, with a staff of 16 people, five of which were journalists, with Vítor Fernandes assuring the channel's economical viability. Shortly before, AACS imposed a €10,000 fine on the FI group, since the local radio stations it owned in northern Portugal aired different programming from what was approved.

=== Fall of Prensa Ibérica ===
On 29 July 2005, Spanish company Prensa Ibérica announced the suspension of the two newspapers it owned in Portugal, Comércio do Porto and A Capital, with a combined group of close to 150 workers, citing a lack of financial viability. On the same day, Vítor Fernandes, alleging an alleged agreement he had allegedly made with that company, went public to accuse the management of Prensa Ibérica of violating the terms of the agreement made with FI, by refusing to continue publication, opting for immediate closure.

According to Vítor Fernandes' statements, the FI had agreed the previous day with the Spanish group Prensa Ibérica, represented in Portugal by António Matos, the purchase of Comércio do Porto, with the condition that the publication would continue for the time necessary to carry out the public deed of purchase, from eight to fifteen days. according to the businessman, the agreement with the representative of Prensa Ibérica provided that the Spanish group would assume the liabilities of O Comércio do Porto, worth around 4.8 million euros, while FI, owner of Invicta TV, would buy the newspaper for "a symbolic price" and would assume the burden of laying off part of the workers, 20 to 25. These layoffs, and other short-term commitments of the periodical, would require a €500,000 injection of capital, which FI would have committed to advance. The remaining workers, around 50, would be integrated into the Invicta TV project, aiming to create a single newsroom where the television channel, radio and newspaper would operate.

According to Prensa Ibérica representatives, the agreement, however, would never have come to fruition. Miguel Anacoreta Correia, administrator of the two companies owned by Prensa Ibérica, confirmed that Vítor Fernandes had actually sent a proposal, but that it had not even been considered, since his company did not present itself as a credible entity.

== Invicta TV goes live ==
The channel's definitive broadcasts started at 7pm on 18 April 2006, with its newscast "Jornal do Grande Porto", being operated by TVTEL, provisionally available on channel 47 of its basic package.

According to the then administrator Vítor Fernandes, the first day of broadcasts lasted until one in the morning, being filled, among others, by "Jornal do Grande Porto", with three daily editions, by the interview program "Nós aqui ao lado" and by the commentary on current affairs by Teresa Lago, former president of Sociedade Porto 2001 - European Capital of Culture. Vítor Fernandes announced his intention to maintain this programming schedule for at least the first two months, later admitting to moving to 12 hours of programming a day. The channel defined itself as exclusively informative, with no room for entertainment.

At the time the broadcasts began, the channel's team consisted of twenty people, with programs and information being managed by journalist Carla Mendes Rocha, who led the first informative block. Vítor Fernandes stated that the channel had an occupancy of 15% of the maximum advertising space, predicting that in the next fifteen days the station could reach a commercial occupancy of 40%. The broadcast infrastructure was assured by FI. The channel did not, however, have the approval of Entidade Reguladora para a Comunicação Social (ERC).

On the very day that Invicta TV began definitive broadcasts, ERC began supervisory action. According to Nuno Pinheiro Torres, executive director of the regulator, in September of the following year, ERC found that there was “material indicative of the exercise of television activities without legal authorization, among other conducts likely to be evaluated in a specific instance", sending the case to the Attorney General's Office. The process was accompanied by respective participation, since illegal television activity is punishable by imprisonment of up to three years or a fine of 320 days. The investigation aimed to find out under which jurisdiction the company that owned the channel, Finanzza Investments, would be under. According to Vítor Fernandes, Invicta TV would be exempt from requiring a license to operate in Portugal, since its headquarters were located in the United States. The ERC, however, found evidence that “the television activity carried out is subject to the jurisdiction of the Portuguese State”, since the channel’s action was not “totally relocated from the national territory or any other State of the European Union”. The information was revealed by ERC on 25 November. On 4 December, Vítor Fernandes, in a press conference, said he was considering suing ERC for "defamation and insults", since, according to him, it was treating the Invicta TV process "with little fairness and legality", stating that the correspondence exchanged in the last two years did not correspond to what ERC has said in the newspapers. According to the businessman, since FI had three employees in the United States, and Invicta TV did not employ any employees, with the content being provided by Grupo Norte Rádio e Televisão, the majority of the structure would be based abroad. According to Vítor Fernandes, at the time the only irregularity related to Invicta TV would be some outstanding salaries that he was trying to pay.

On 4 September 2006, FI's administration announced the nomination of television producer Ediberto Lima for the post of the channel's director-general, replacing Vítor Fernandes, who until then had combined this role with that of executive director of FI.

In late September, the channel was exclusively carried by cable, from 7pm to 1am.

=== Late payments and salaries ===
In September 2006, Vítor Fernandes, channel administrator, was, according to Jornal de Notícias, accused of cheating suppliers and collaborators, who, due to lack of payment for services, ended up leaving the project. According to the same newspaper, at that time, the businessman already had four court cases and one complaint to the police.

José Miranda, of Mixim, film and television production company, accused Vítor Fernandes of wanting to "create a channel with zero investment", stating that Invicta TV was "nothing more than an illegal channel". The producer stated that he had been promised the position of programming director at the station and had provided free services to the station for eight months. He then hired the design company Comunicação, to take care of the channel's image, whose service, costing three thousand euros, would never have been paid for. Miranda stated that, after having unsuccessfully insisted on payment, he had realized that nothing in the Invicta TV project was real, that the businessman had no capital, and was forced to take legal action.

The same happened to Linha de Terra, national film and graphic design production company, who was granted the channel's look, bumpers and intros to programs, whose requisition, worth seven thousand euros, was never paid, and debt collection was also sent to court.

Another company, Aquafilmes, which provided filming material and camera operators to Invicta TV, took legal action regarding a debt exceeding 20 thousand euros. Nelson Rocha, one of the operators, revealed that he still had unpaid wages, having resigned in July, as he not only did not receive payment, but also financed the gasoline needed for travel, which reached up to two thousand kilometers per month in his own vehicle.

Ricardo Martins, who had initially taken over as program director, resigned ten months later, stating that "the channel is not serious or professional", and justifying his departure with the fact that he did not want his name "associated with a project without minimum conditions".

Paula Veloso, Vítor Fernandes' secretary, who took office on 20 April, revealed that she never realized exactly what her role would be. Despite this, upon realizing that the company did not have any financial structure in place, it began looking for advertising contracts that would support the channel. He left the station on 7 April, as he could not bear the lack of payment of his monthly salary, of around €700. With two months of salary in arrears, Vítor Fernandes allegedly wrote him a €500 check, which was not covered. Paula then went to the studios to present her resignation to Vítor Fernandes, who called the police, stating that the secretary had invaded his property, that she was stealing from him and that he did not feel safe. During the episode, Paula Veloso filed a complaint against Vítor Fernandes for insults and an unpaid check.

According to Jornal de Notícias, at the date of the report, Most of the journalists responsible for the broadcast had not been paid since June, having signed employment contracts that, among other clauses, obligated them to a pact of silence for five years, having to pay a fine of €150,000 if they broke it.

Faced with the accusations, Vítor Fernandes denied any late payment, stating that he was focused on the objective of getting Invicta TV to broadcast to France, Spain and Germany.

In October 2006, eight people who worked for the channel, including four journalists and the information director, responsible for the channel's content, all employees of Grupo Norte Rádio e Televisão, also owned by Vítor Fernandes, terminated the contract that linked them to the company, claiming three months of unpaid wages, which corresponded to the months of July, August and September, stating that they were tired of the "constant promises to pay.” Vítor Fernandes admitted to Correio da Manhã that he may have had overdue wages, although not as much as the employees claimed.

In November of that year, Vítor Fernandes was suing for failure to pay three months' wages to former employees. The businessman assumed that these debts existed, guaranteeing that they would be paid soon.

On 22 November 2006, journalist Miguel Conde Coutinho, at the service of weekly newspaper Expresso, was preparing an investigative report on Invicta TV, which would be published the following Saturday, on 26 November, going to the station's facilities in Porto. According to Expresso, during this contact the journalist was kidnapped and detained by the owner of the television station, Vitor Fernandes, in those facilities, with the journalist claiming that he was engaging in ethically reprehensible behavior. Vítor Fernandes called the police, keeping Miguel Coutinho detained for around twenty minutes, until the security forces arrived. According to a Correio da Manhã source, Coutinho and the Expresso photographer went to Invicta TV, with the aim of photographing Vítor Fernandes, aiming to complete the reporting work. Upon arrival, Fernandes ordered them to sit down, asking Coutinho whether he had contacted a certain source, to which the journalist replied yes. Fernandes then picked up the phone, asking the person who was listening to him whether the journalist had pretended to be her lawyer. Fernandes later told Coutinho that he could not leave the room until the police arrived, calling two individuals and locking the door, as the police testified when they arrived at the scene. Vítor Fernandes denied to Correio da Manhã that he had kidnapped Coutinho, stating that “kidnapping is when you run away with someone away from the police and not when you are with someone waiting for the police”. On the other hand, the same source from the newspaper stated that the journalist would never have pretended to be the administrator's lawyer, and Fernandes' allegation was false.

Although Vítor Fernandes stated that he only wanted to guarantee the journalist's identification to take legal action against him, Expresso considered that there had been a crime of kidnapping. On 24 November, Miguel Coutinho filed a complaint of kidnapping against Vítor Fernandes at the Porto Public Security Police (PSP). Vítor Fernandes, for his part, filed complaints against Miguel Coutinho, both at the PSP and at the ERC, accusing Coutinho of having posed as his lawyer to a source “to illicitly obtain information and access to sources of information”.

== End of Invicta TV and TVTEL takeover ==
On 3 January 2007, cable television and Internet operator TVTEL announced that it had acquired the contents and brand Invicta TV - Televisão do Grande Porto from FI, thus placing the channel under Portuguese jurisdiction. Júlio Martins de Sousa, president of the board of directors of TVTEL, commented that the purchase "put an end to a series of controversies and suspicions" related to the channel's legality, anticipating his company's interest in starting in the content production business area, as well as developing its own regional channel. The six previously hired employees, journalists and camera operators, would be retained, participating in the remodeling of the television project, not moving forward with any commitment with the then general director of the station, Ediberto Lima.

On the same date, the operator announced the temporary suspension of the channel's broadcasts, ensured since the previous April by FI, announcing its intention to take the opportunity to carry out a general restructuring of the channel. All programs produced by Invicta TV would, however, be broadcast on a television channel via the Internet, available through www.invictatv.com, the channel's website. TVTel announced that it hoped to complete the restructuring process within two months. The channel would eventually be shut down.

== Região Norte TV ==
On 30 March 2007, TVTEL announced the replacement of Invicta TV with a new exclusively informative channel, Região Norte TV, becoming the operator's first bet in the area of content production, whose broadcasting was scheduled to begin on 1 September of that year. The launch was subsequently delayed to a period between late October and early November, with negotiations with other providers happening at a later stage.

In December of that year, RNTV - Região Norte Televisão was presented by TVTel as a channel dedicated to current information in the North region, with Vítor Fernandes, former administrator of the defunct Invicta TV and FI, as programming director. The new channel began broadcasting in January 2008, reinforcing investment by 300 thousand euros in March of that year. In March, the channel started airing sports programs produced by its then-newest outlet, the SCN website. Per a condition suggested in January and approved on 24 June, ZON would add four channels (RNTV, Música Brasil, French-based CLP TV and SCN Sportcanal) on its line-up, as part of its acquisition of TVTEL.

== Regiões TV ==
TVTel would later be acquired by ZON, currently NOS, and RNTV, successor to Invicta TV, would give rise to Regiões TV (RTV).

The new channel, dedicated to the regions from north to south of Portugal, was launched by ZON TVCabo on 5 December 2008, on channel 201 of its digital line-up, on its basic and advanced packages in some regions. The channel was produced by Nextv Rádio e Televisão SA, still directed by Vítor Fernandes, as Director-Geral of Programming, and Andreia Carneiro, as Director of News. The license name remained Região Norte TV until 2010. On 17 February 2009, the channel presented itself at an event at the Magalhães Pessoa Municipal Stadium and announced that it would eventually go nationwide on ZON's satellite service soon. Simultaneously, RTV opened a unit there to cover central Portugal, RTV Centro.

Over time, the channel started hiring big names from Portuguese television. One of the first being Marisa Cruz with Caminho da Fama, which was introduced in March 2009. NexTV also aimed at launching its contents in other Lusophone countries.

A fire hit its sets on the early hours of 29 July 2010, causing "high damage" but not interfering the channel's programming.

In September 2011, Ediberto Lima was appointed creative and artistic director at RTV and MVM. Among the programs he made for RTV included Rosa Choque, a program based on celebrity gossip segments on morning programs. Singer Alexandre Faria also worked with Ediberto in this period.

The channel's longtime shareholders, Martins de Sousa and Paulo Pereira (former owners of TVTEL), sold their 25% interest in NEXTV to Angolan interests in March 2016 for the sum of €20 million, subsequently changing its concept primarily towards agribusiness. NEXTV was declared insolvent on 20 March 2020. Finally, the channel ceased operations on 3 November 2020, after the lack of renewal between NOS and NexTV on 31 March, with ERC declaring its license defunct on 16 December.
