= SCN Sportcanal =

- Country: Portugal

Programming
- Language: Portuguese
- Picture format: 4:3 (576i, SDTV)

Ownership
- Owner: NexTV (TVTEL/ZON Multimédia)
- Sister channels: Regiões TV mvm

History
- Launched: 27 November 2008; 17 years ago
- Closed: 27 November 2008; 17 years ago

SCN Sportcanal was a Portuguese sports television channel operated by NexTV. The channel made a single experimental broadcast on 27 November 2008 with the broadcast of the UEFA Cup match between S.L. Benfica and Olympiacos F.C.; after that, it planned a full launch, but that was never achieved.

== History ==
The SCN brand was first used by TVTEL/NexTV on 6 March 2008, as a website dedicated to minor sports (other than football), employing 26 people. One of its goals was to produce basketball and volleyball telecasts that would be available exclusively on its website. It was also in charge of the sports programming on Região Norte TV. By 24 June, SCN was gearing up to a full sports channel on the TVTEL platform's basic package. With the approval of the ZON-TVTEL merger that day, ZON (which added MVM in May) was obliged to include four channels: three produced by TVTEL/NexTV (RNTV, SCN and Música Brasil) and the French-based CLP TV.

On 5 November 2008, ZON announced that it would broadcast the match between Olympiacos and Benfica at 19:45 of 27 November on its platform, as well as on TVTEL, using SCN as its partner. According to a ZON spokesperson, the match alone received "huge interest among the subscriber base". S.L. Benfica, TVI and Cabovisão all condemned the decision, with S.L. Benfica considering the broadcast illegal; this prompted Portuguese media regulator ERC to answer the complaints on 25 November and ruled the following day that the broadcast was legal.

In some areas, the match aired without the commentators. Its sole experimental broadcast won the cable ratings that evening, with 1,966,000 viewers tuning in. SCN director Tiago Almeida promised more experimental broadcasts and expected to start a regular service soon.
