= Calheta de Nesquim =

- Civil parish
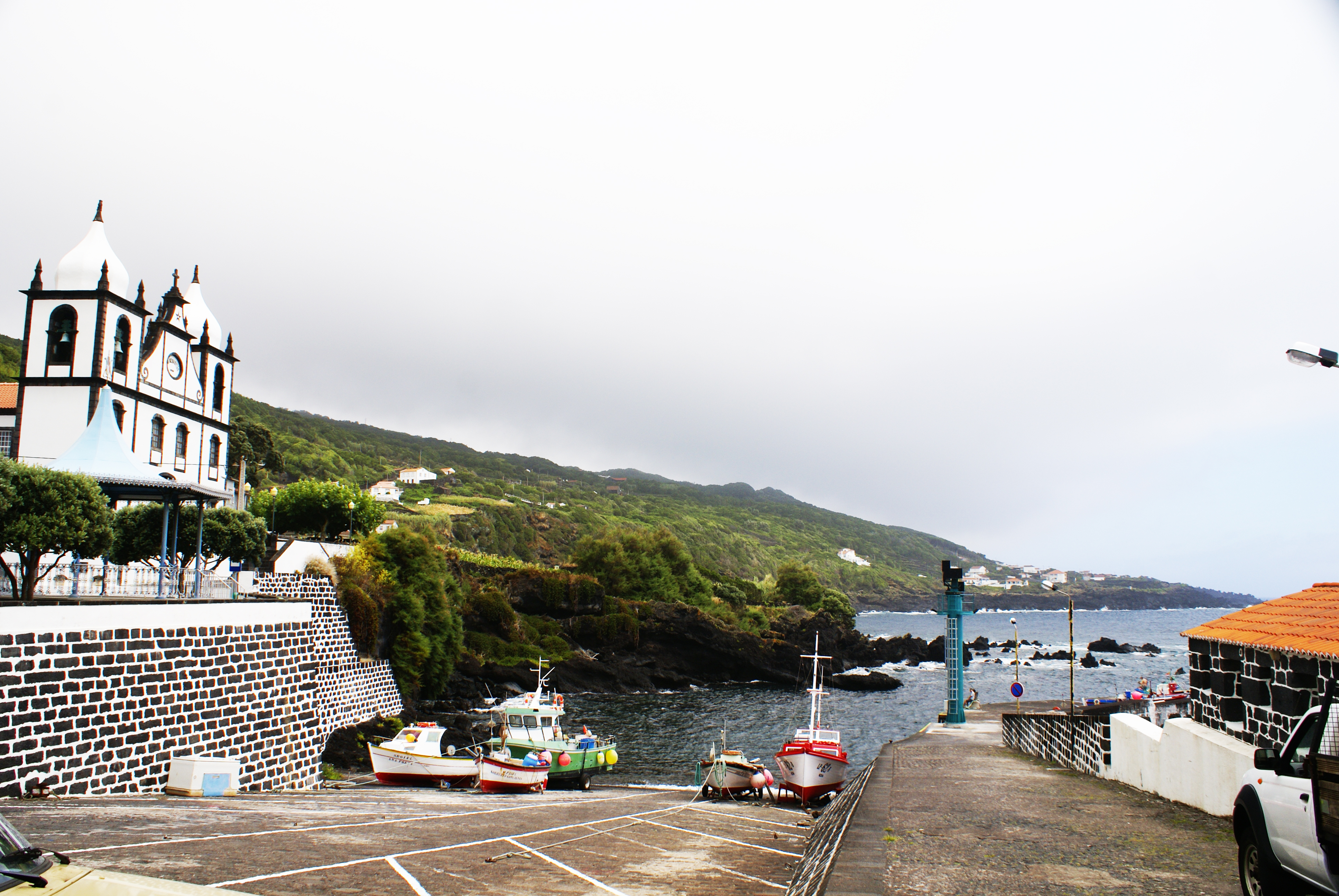
- The fishing port and coastal perspective of Calheta de Nesquim, with the parish church dedicated to São Sebastião

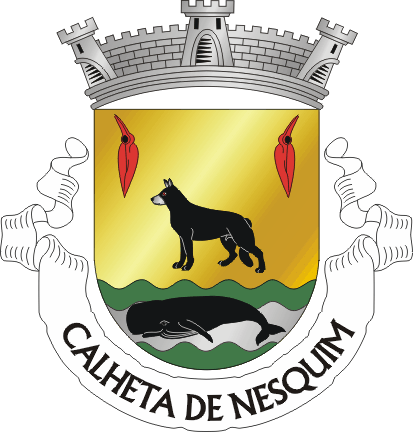
- Coat of arms

- Location of the civil parish of Calheta de Nesquim, within the municipality of Lajes do Pico, on the island of Pico
- Coordinates: 38°25′17″N 28°5′43″W
- Country: Portugal
- Auton. region: Azores
- Island: Pico
- Municipality: Lajes do Pico
- Established: Settlement: 15th century Parish: fl. 1680

Area
  - Total: 13.81 km^{2} (5.33 sq mi)
- Elevation: 420 m (1,380 ft)

Population (2011)
  - Total: 343
  - Density: 24.8/km^{2} (64.3/sq mi)
- Time zone: UTC−01:00 (AZOT)
  - Summer (DST): UTC+00:00 (AZOST)
- Postal code: 9930-057
- Patron: São Sebastião
- Website: www.calhetadenesquim.freguesias.pt

Calheta de Nesquim is a civil parish, along the southern coast of the municipality of Lajes do Pico, in the Portuguese Azores. The population in 2011 was 343, in an area of 13.81 km^{2}.

== History ==
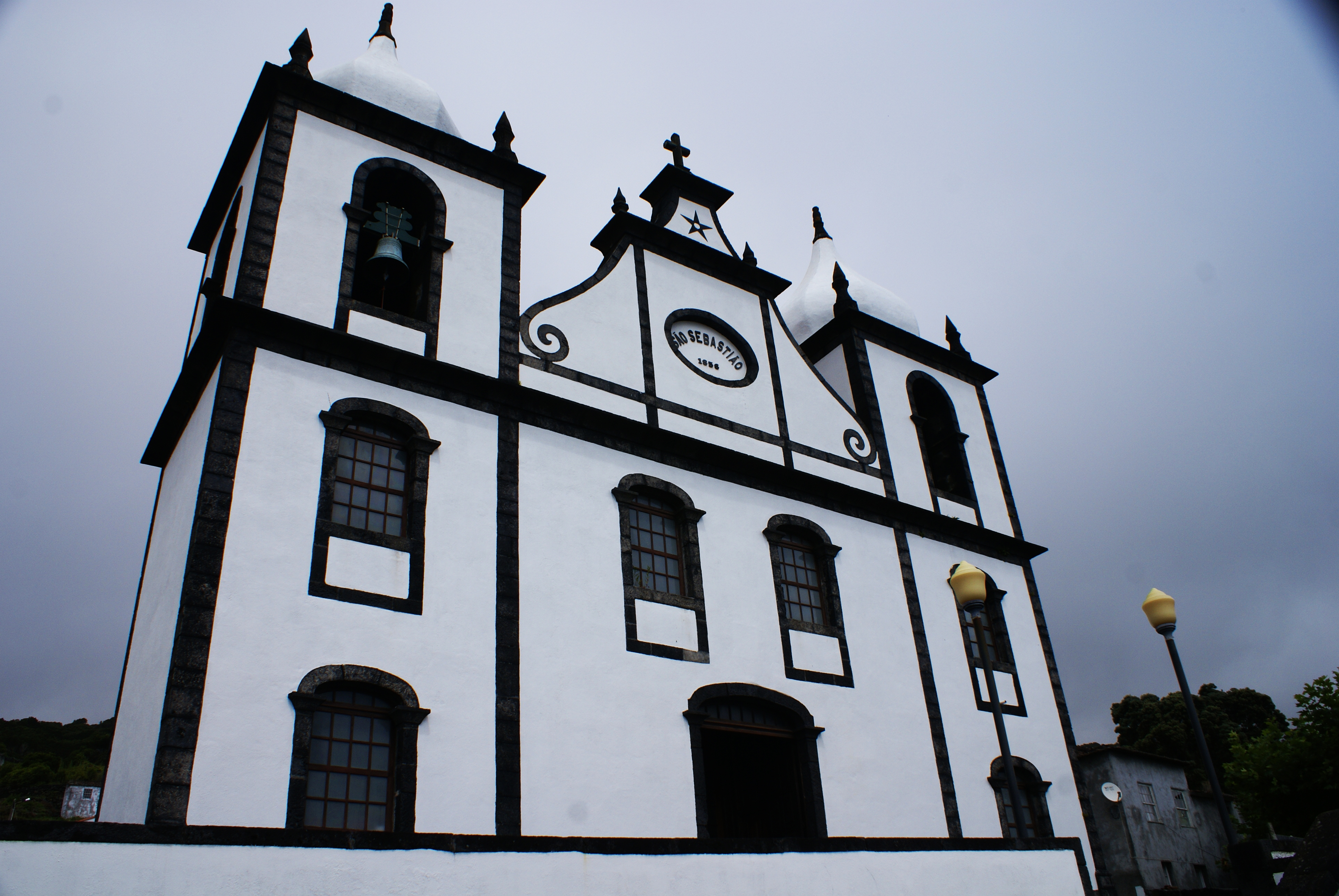
The old parish church of São Sebastião constructed over the vestiges of the older chapel in the 15th century

In the 16th century, during a tempestuous and dark night, a ship returning from Brazil, loaded with wood, shipwrecked along the southern coast of Pico. Three survived the shipwreck (João Redondo or Rodolfo; João Valim; and the ship's captain, Diogo Vaz Dourado), and were guided to safety by the ship's dog, to a small bay. The dog was named "Nesquim", and the small bay became known as the "Calheta de Nesquim" (small bay of Nesquim). As the story goes, Nesquim had originally survived the tempest by jumping to safety onto a natural dyke along the coast, called Morricão. It was this legendary story that inspired the heraldry of the parish, which includes a dog to represent Nesquim, the "discoverer" of the small bay.

By 1680, a religious parish of São Sebastião da Calheta had already existed for some time (although the date of the community's settlement remains unclear). The construction of the parochial church began on 8 July 1851, and concluded with its consecration on 7 September 1856; it was constructed on the ruins of the older chapel (that had existed since the 15th century). It was the parish priest, Father António Silveira de Ávila, who had lived in Calheta de Nesquim for many years that had originally promoted the construction of the church.

It was Father Manuel Alvernaz, a citizen of Prainha do Norte, who help found the Cooperativa Progresso Calhetense a benevolent group dedicated to economic growth and assisting their members in the eastern municipality, and parish. It constructed a building to produce many of the local goods for export, including ceramics, pottery and local metal-works. Around 1925 a small boat was built by one of its members, Manuel António Furtado Simas (better known as Master Manuel Bentes) a resident of Santo Amaro, and sentimentally referred to as a Rainha das Lanchas (Queen of Launches), but christened Calheta in honor of the peoples of the Cooperative. In 1931, the little launch was sold to the municipality of Horta, and later incorporated into the fleet of Transmaçor (the Azorean Maritime Transport company), where it ended its days making regular scheduled trips between Madalena and Horta. Until then it was responsible for transporting people and goods between Pico, Faial, São Jorge and Terceira, under the command of João do José Goulart (and his mates João da Antonica, of Piedade and Francisco Goulart of Santa Cruz. Around 1927, Father Manuel Alvernaz became the confessor in Santa Cruz da Graciosa, and left the Cooperative, starting a slow decline that would finally see it close down in the following years.

== Geography ==
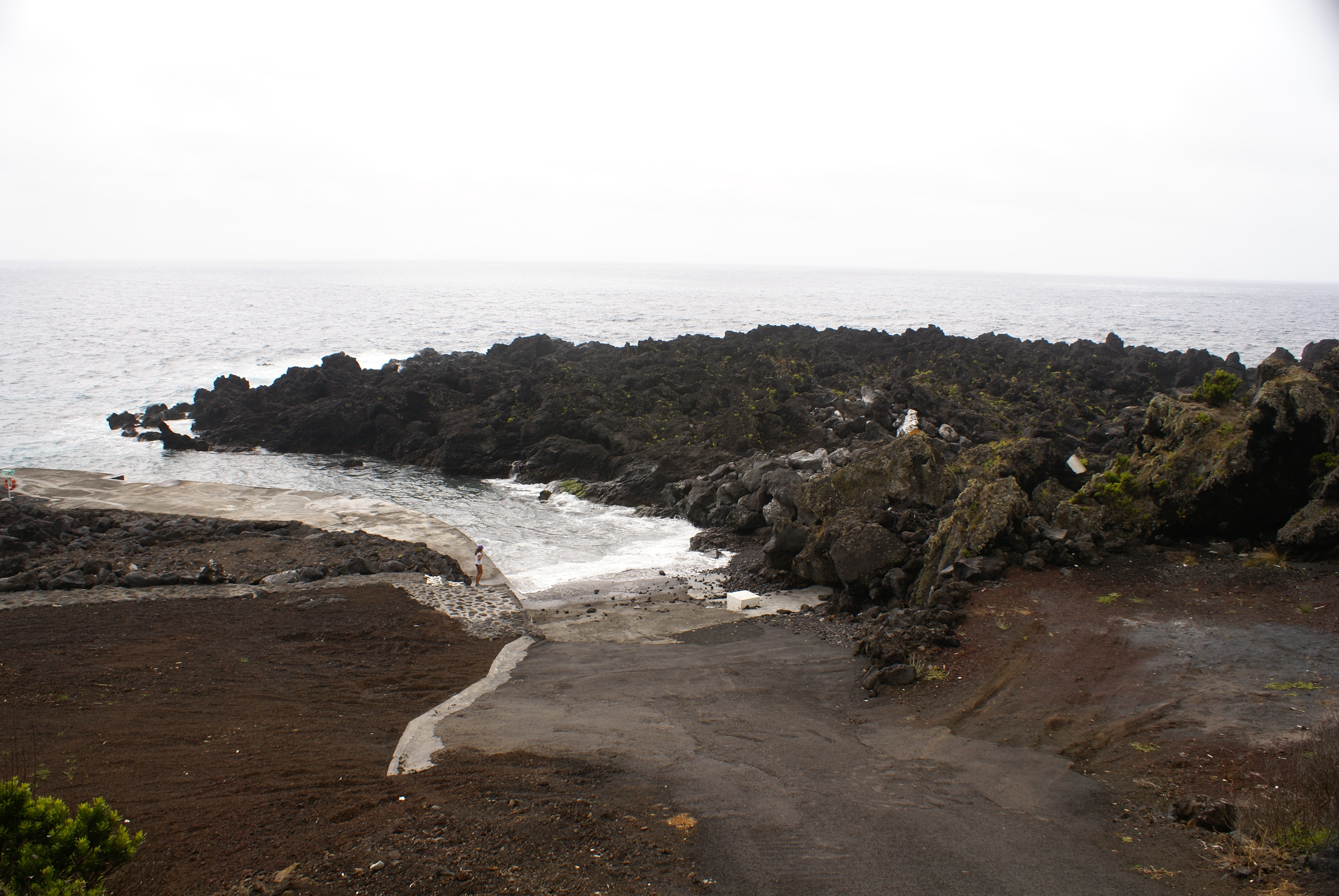
The rocky outcroppings that act as a barrier along the coast of Nesquim

Calheta de Nesquim is situated in the southwest coast of Pico, 18 kilometers from the municipal seat of Lajes do Pico, and connected to the parishes of Piedade (Lajes do Pico) and Ribeiras by the Regional E.R.1-1ª motorway.

Its heart is the town of the same name, and is covered in dense vegetation in the interior and rugged cliffs to along the coast, extending to smaller hamlets: Foros, Cruz da Calheta, Jogo da Bola, Fetais, Canada da Saúde, Canadas, Terreiro and Feteira. The old ramal was adapted for transit in 1942 (inaugurated on May 22), and accesses the center of the village (referred to as Terreiro) where the main church, the port and Polivalente (the multi-purpose civic center), as well most commercial businesses are located.

== Architecture ==
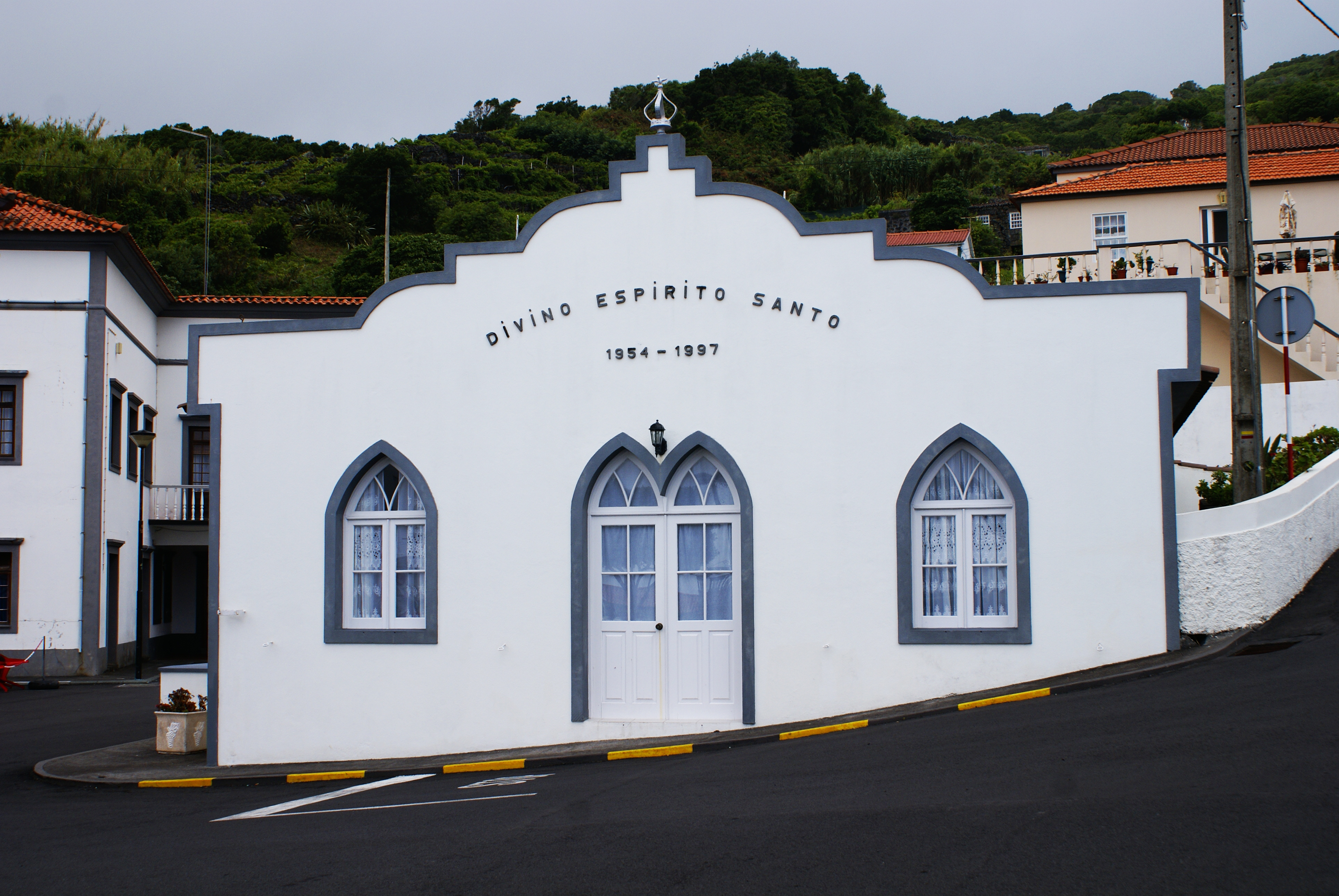
The traditional império dedicated to the Holy Spirit, site of religious feasts and central to annual celebrations

The civil parish has undertaken several projects to attract tourist dollars, in this mainly agriculture and fishing community. These include park areas in Morricão and Feteira, the remodeling of the antique windmill, and construction or expansion of existing natural pools at Poço das Mujas and Portinho da Feteira.

=== Civic ===
- Whale-hunting buildings and installations (Portuguese: Património baleeiro), used to demonstrate Calheta de Nesquim tradition of whaling during since the 16th century;
- Windmill of Morricão (Portuguese: Moínho de vento do Morricão), an example of the traditional windmills that were used during the formative period of the communities growth;

=== Religious ===
- Church of São Sebastião (Portuguese: Igreja Paroquial de Calheta de Nesquim/Igreja de São Sebastião), the parochial church located in the center of the village, the zone referred to as the Terreiro; the temple is a building with two bell-towers, and constructed facing the ocean, owing to its communities focus on the sea. In 1948, new bells and a clock were added to the front facade, along with images of Santa Filomena and Santa Teresinha, due to the patronage of Lourenço Oliveira (a U.S. emigrant and former resident). In 1983, new renovations, supported by Emília Vieira da Silva (another U.S. emigrant), the local authority (junta freguesia), municipal council of Lajes do Pico, and the Azorean Regional Government;
- Hermitage of São Sebastião (Portuguese: Ermida do Cemitério de São Sebastião), located in the cemetery, it is one of the examples of early 16th-century architecture;
- Império of Calheta de Nesquim (Portuguese: Império do Espírito Santo da Calheta do Nesquim), a 20th-century religious building used in the festivals dedicated to the Cult of the Holy Spirit, influenced by Terceirense architecture of the period, that includes singular space with rounded facade surmounted by crown and series of Gothic-inspired windows;

== Culture ==
Being both a civil parish and religious community, the population celebrates a mixture of secular and religious celebrations annually. They include the religious festivals of: the Feast Day of São Sebastião (celebrated on the 24 January), São Pedro Gonçalves (January 31), the festival of Nossa Senhora de Fátima (on the Sunday closest to the 13th of May), the Feast of Bom Jesus (August 6) and semi-secular festival of São Martinho (with traditional festivities on 11, 13 and 14 November). In addition, the ubiquitous religious celebration of the Holy Spirit, occurs at Calheta de Nesquim's império and chapel during the Sunday and Monday of Pentecosts. In addition, the community also has a festival of band music supported by the local Filarmónica from 9–11 July, not to mention the Festa da Cabra e Cavala (literally, the "festival of the goat and mackerel") on August 7-8th.

The Sociedade Filarmónica Lira Fraternal Calhetense was formed in 1888, from a small group of Republicans, that included the teacher Manuel Pereira Gomes, who organized a group of fourteen musicians that played until around 1910. After a period of inactivity, a new band was established during the 1920s by a group of youth supported by Father Lourenço of Ribeirinha (then parish priest). In 1930 the Lira Fraternal Calhetense returned, this time under the directorship of Gregório Reis, until he left to form the União Musical Calhetense beginning a rivalry between the established bands in 1934. Some families stopped talking to each other, friends parted ways, as the distinction between the Musica Nova (the "new music"), of the União Musical, and the Musica Velha ("old music") of the traditionalist Lira Fraternal Calhetense. This rivalry would remain bitter as the Lira Fraternal Calhetense was directed by João Ávial de Melo, and would persist until the 1940s when few musicians and financial difficulties would force the integration of both bands. Over the years many musicians and band directors would flow into and out of the Fraternal Calhetense, but none of the antagonisms from the mid-century would persist.

Annually, the Festa da Lira Fraternal Calhetense on the second weekend of July, is a consequence of the elevated stature of this institution to the community. It brings other musical groups from around the island, as well as abroad, for a couple days of concerts.

== Notable citizens ==
- José Dias de Melo (8 April 1925 - São José; 24 September 2008), author, noted for many of his writings on whaling, emigration and Azorean life, that included "Toadas do Mar e da Terra", "Pedras Negras", "Mar Rubro" and "Mar Pla Proa".
