= O Jogo =

Portuguese daily sport newspaper

- Front page of O Jogo from 22 May 2008
- Type: Daily Sports newspaper
- Format: Tabloid
- Owner: Global Media Group
- Founded: 22 February 1985; 41 years ago
- Language: Portuguese
- Headquarters: Porto
- Circulation: 28,900 (2010)
- Website: www.ojogo.pt

O Jogo (Portuguese pronunciation: [u ˈʒoɣu]; English: The Game) is a Portuguese daily sport newspaper published in Porto.

== History and profile ==
O Jogo was first published on 22 February 1985 by the Jornal de Notícias company in Porto, and it is seen as appealing mainly to supporters of FC Porto, being publicly criticized by Benfica, suppressing the gap of the two other national sports newspapers, A Bola and Record. O Jogo has also a Lisbon edition.

O Jogo is published in tabloid format. The paper was sold in 1995 to Lusomundo Media subsidiary Jornalinveste, which was later absorbed into Controlinveste in 2005 after Lusomundo Media merged with Olivedesportos, before renaming itself as Global Media Group in 2015.

== Circulation ==
The circulation of O Jogo was 34,837 copies in 2002, 40,677 copies in 2003 and 49,809 copies in 2004. The circulation of the paper was 44,878 copies in 2005, 41,473 copies in 2006 and 35,976 copies in 2007. Its 2010 circulation was 28,900 copies.

== Player of the Year ==
	Player	Club
2012		
2013		
2016		
2017	(Algeria) Yacine Brahimi	Porto
2018		
2019	(Portugal) Bruno Fernandes	Sporting CP

== Teams of the Year ==
Since 2012, O Jogo has organised the Team of the Year award, which distinguishes the best 11 players of the calendar year of the Primeira Liga.

=== 2012 ===
Pos.	Player	Club
GK	(Brazil) Helton	Porto
RB	(Uruguay) Maxi Pereira	Benfica
CB	(Argentina) Nicolás Otamendi	Porto
CB	(Argentina) Ezequiel Garay	Benfica
LB	(Brazil) Alex Sandro	Porto
DM	(Brazil) Fernando	Porto
CM	(Belgium) Axel Witsel	Benfica
CM	(Portugal) João Moutinho	Porto
RW	(Colombia) James Rodríguez	Porto
LW	(Brazil) Hulk	Porto
CF	(Colombia) Jackson Martínez	Porto

=== 2013 ===
Pos.	Player	Club
GK	(Portugal) Rui Patrício	Sporting CP
RB	(Brazil) Danilo	Porto
CB	(France) Eliaquim Mangala	Porto
CB	(Argentina) Ezequiel Garay	Benfica
LB	(Brazil) Alex Sandro	Porto
DM	(Brazil) Fernando	Porto
CM	(Argentina) Enzo Pérez	Benfica
CM	(Portugal) João Moutinho	Porto
RW	(Colombia) James Rodríguez	Porto
LW	(Argentina) Nicolás Gaitán	Benfica
CF	(Colombia) Jackson Martínez	Porto

=== 2016 ===
Pos.	Player	Club
GK	(Brazil) Ederson	Benfica
RB	(Portugal) Nélson Semedo	Benfica
CB	(Sweden) Victor Lindelöf	Benfica
CB	(Brazil) Felipe	Porto
LB	(Spain) Álex Grimaldo	Benfica
CM	(Portugal) João Mário	Sporting CP
CM	(Portugal) Danilo Pereira	Porto
CM	(Portugal) Adrien Silva	Sporting CP
AM	(Portugal) Gelson Martins	Sporting CP
CF	(Brazil) Jonas	Benfica
CF	(Portugal) André Silva	Porto

=== 2017 ===
Pos.	Player	Club
GK	(Portugal) Rui Patrício	Sporting CP
RB	(Portugal) Ricardo Pereira	Porto
CB	(Spain) Iván Marcano	Porto
CB	(Brazil) Felipe	Porto
LB	(Brazil) Alex Telles	Porto
DM	(Portugal) Danilo Pereira	Porto
CM	(Portugal) Bruno Fernandes	Sporting CP
RM	(Portugal) Gelson Martins	Sporting CP
LM	(Algeria) Yacine Brahimi	Porto
CF	(Cameroon) Vincent Aboubakar	Porto
CF	(Netherlands) Bas Dost	Sporting CP
