= Ribeirinha =

Ribeirinha may refer to the following places in the Azores, Portugal:

- Ribeirinha (Angra do Heroísmo), a civil parish in the municipality of Angra do Heroísmo, Terceira
- Ribeirinha (Horta), a civil parish in the municipality of Horta, Faial
- Ribeirinha (Lajes do Pico), a civil parish in the municipality of Lajes do Pico, Pico
- Ribeirinha (Ribeira Grande), a civil parish in the municipality of Ribeira Grande, São Miguel
