= José Dias de Melo =

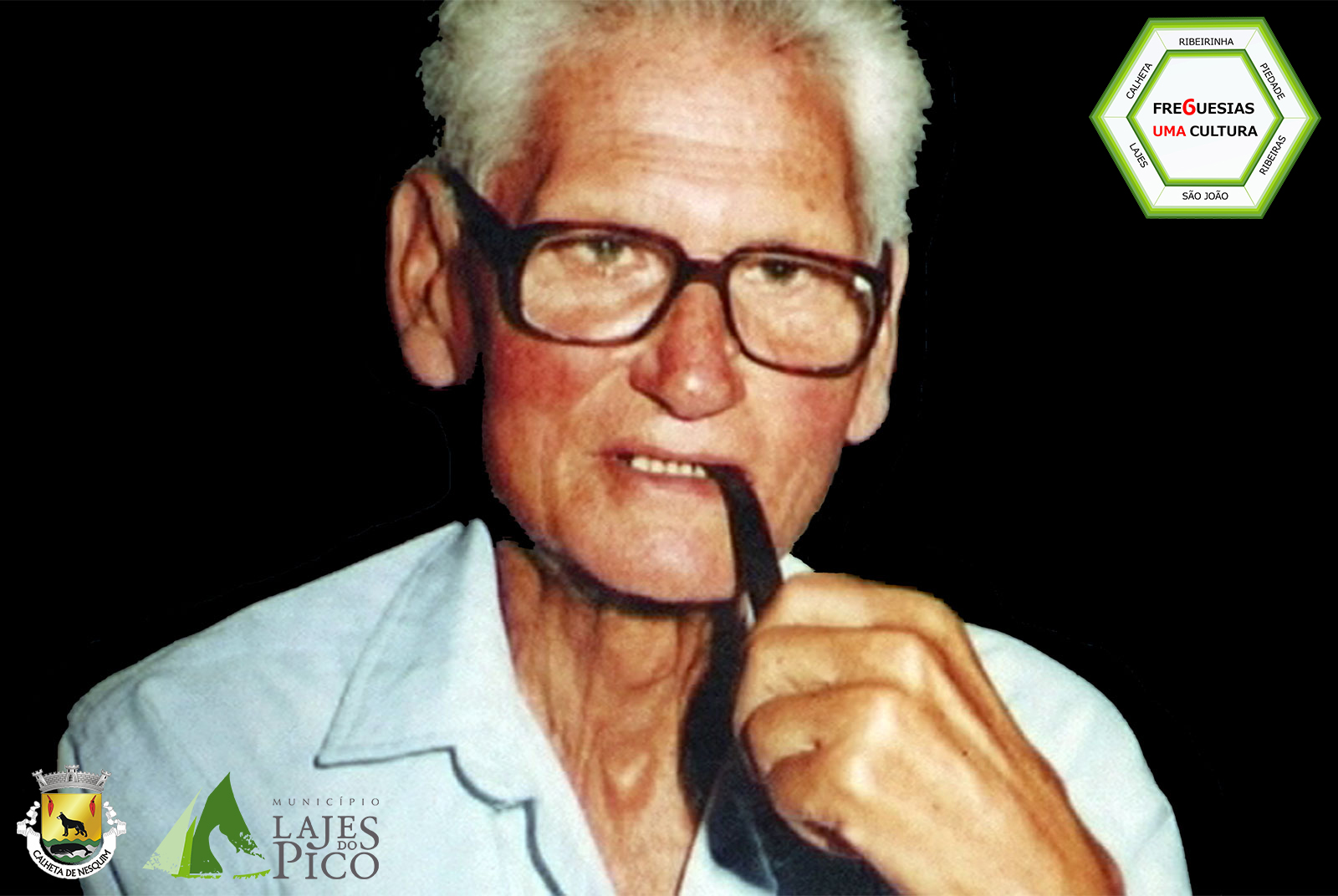
Dias de Melo

José Dias de Melo (April 8, 1925 – September 24, 2008), was an Azorean author and writer.

== Biography ==
He studied in the city of Horta, in the local lyceum and primary educational institution, but eventually settled in Ponta Delgada after 1949 where he was to marry and begin a family. He completed his courses in teaching in Ponta Delgada, and became a teacher in a preparatory institution before moving on to teach in Cova da Piedade (1976–1977) and Lajes do Pico (1978–1979). While in Horta he worked for the regional newspapers, including the regional newspapers O Telegrafo, Açores, and Ilha, and the national media Diário de Notícias and Diário de Lisboa; during his time in Horta, with other school colleagues, he helped found the Associação Cultural Académica ("Academic Cultural Association") in November, 1944.

=== Literature ===
It was during the 1950s, that he would begin his literary career with his book of poems Todas do Mar e da Terra ("Everything in the Sea and Land").

His contribution to Portuguese culture is his thirty published works in various styles: poems, narratives, novels, romances, chronicle, monographs, dissertations and studies in the field of ethnography. He captured in his writings the particular culture of mid-century Azorean life, and in particular the experiences of emigrants, the people involved in whaling, and the culture of the island of Pico. A dominant theme in his works was an empathy, or sympathy, for the socially unprotected, the victims of the powers-that-be, and the uncontrollable forces of nature. The book Pedras Negras ('Dark Stones'), published for the first time in 1954, and now on its 4th edition, was translated into various languages (including English and Japanese). It is considered his best-selling and most accessible work. Writing of this book, Urbano Bettencourt said:

"in Pedras Negras, Dias de Melo represented island life at the end of the 19th century, whaling and its role in triggering emigration to North America, learning of the world within fierce competition, the inhumanity and solidarity also, the material successes, in the end, proportioned by the loss of abundance."

Similarly, Vamberto Freitas, wrote how he "registered and/or tranfigured the problematic socio-political and economic situation of the islands, turning them a part of contemporary Portuguese history." The Azorean writer, Cristóvão de Aguiar affirmed that Dias de Melo "remains for posterity, a symbol of the man of the sea...his is a whaler's writer that provided a picture in realtime of the whaler's life..." But, Dias de Melo also wrote of life in the Azores from the perspectives of the gentrymen, farmer, fisherman, cattlemen and other social classes.

Former President of Portugal, Mário Soares, bestowed on him the Order of the Infante for his contribution to literature in Portugal, while the city council of Lajes do Pico awarded him an Honorary Citizenship. Similarly, the President of the Regional Government of the Azores presided over a public session that honoured Dias de Melo, which included a new release of his trilogy Pedras Negras, Mar Rubro and Mar Pela Proa.

With over 50 years in literature, he died at the age of 83, in Ponta Delgada on September 24, 2008.

== Published works ==
- Mar Rubro (1958)
- Pedras Negras (1964)
- Cidade Cinzenta (1971)
- Mar pela Proa (1976)
- Vinde e Vede (1983)
- Vida Vivida em Terras de Baleeiros (1985)
- Das Velas de Lona às Asas de Alumínio (1990)
- Na Memória das Gentes (1991)
- O Menino Deixou de Ser Menino (1992)
- Aquém e Além-Canal (1992)
- A Viagem do Medo Maior (1993)
- Pena Dela Saudades de Mim (1994)
- Inverno sem Primavera (1996)
- O Autógrafo (1999)
- Milhas Contadas (2002)
- Poeira do Caminho (2004)
