= São João (Lajes do Pico) =

- Civil parish
- The coast along São João, showing village, looking towards the summit of Pico, in the west

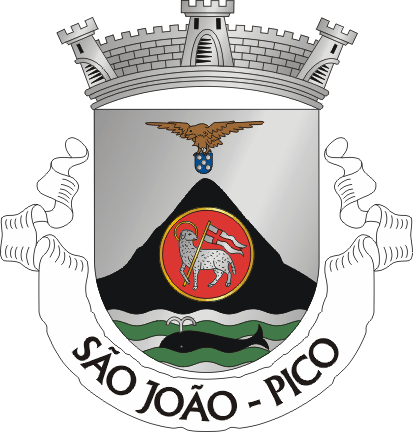
- Coat of arms

- Location of the civil parish of São João in the municipality of Lajes do Pico
- Coordinates: 38°24′55″N 28°19′58″W
- Country: Portugal
- Auton. region: Azores
- Island: Pico
- Municipality: Lajes do Pico
- Established: Settlement: fl. 15th century Parish: 1700

Area
  - Total: 32.94 km^{2} (12.72 sq mi)
- Elevation: 34 m (112 ft)

Population (2011)
  - Total: 423
  - Density: 12.8/km^{2} (33.3/sq mi)
- Time zone: UTC−01:00 (AZOT)
  - Summer (DST): UTC+00:00 (AZOST)
- Postal code: 9930-456
- Area code: 292
- Patron: São João

View out the sea

São João, named for John the Baptist (in Portuguese) is a civil parish in the municipality of Lajes do Pico in the Portuguese archipelago of the Azores. It is the only civil parish in the municipality with a border on the summit of Pico (2,351 meters). The population in 2011 was 423, in an area of 32.94 km^{2}. It contains the localities Areia, Companhia de Baixo, Companhia de Cima and Ponta Rasa.

== History ==
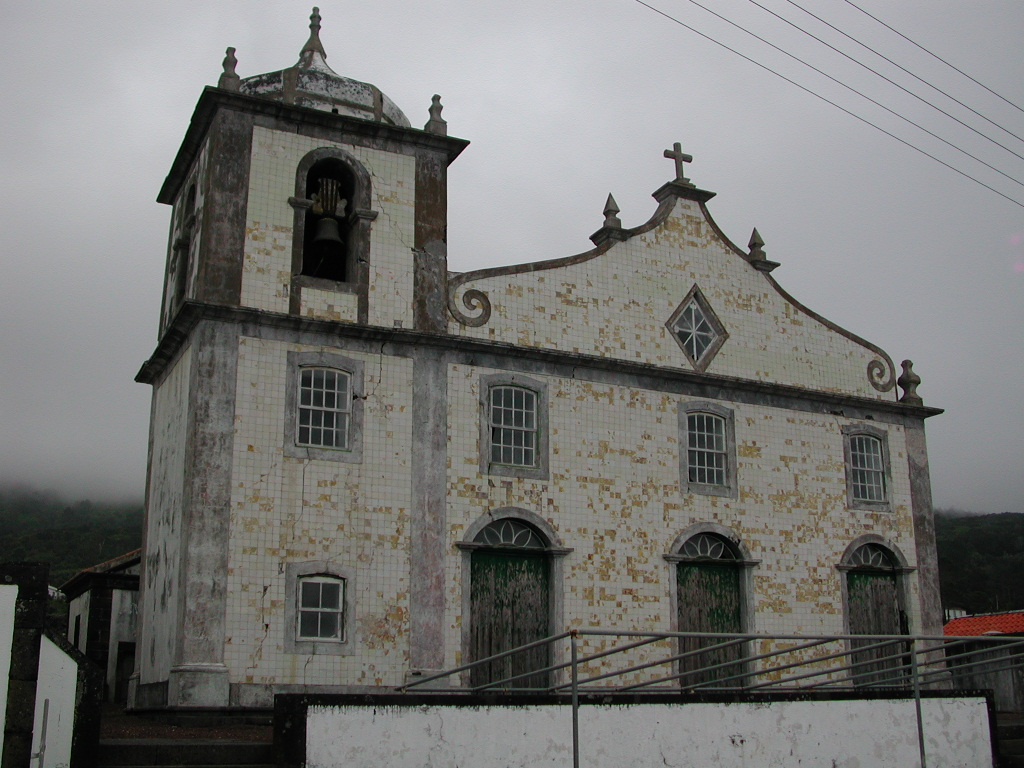
Pre-renovation façade of the Church of São João

Oral tradition holds that São João was part of a large southern parish of São Mateus, in the primitive locality of Arruda, some 12 kilometres (7.5 mi) from the centre of Lajes. The name, Arruda came from a medicinal herb that prospered in the landscape of the parish, a region known for extensive arable agricultural parcels dedicated to cereal production (particularly wheat). At the time of settlement, the parochial church held an extensive 20 alqueires of land in cultivation, as well receiving an annual tithe equal to 15 alqueires. Even today the lands around Areia between São Mateus and São João were considered the most productive of this region. Yet, the residents of this area did not only dedicate to cereal production, instead dividing themselves between the fishery and raising of cattle and sheep for wool.

Owing to the growth in population, São Mateus began to be divided into smaller territories, resulting in the dismemberment of Arruda, that would give origin to São João Baptista. Around 1619 a small hermitage was erected by Domingos Marques and his wife, Silveira do Macedo, dedicated to this patron, whose image appeared on the beach. The small hermitage was expanded and elevated to the status of parochia (ecclesiastical parish) possibly after 1700, from affirmations of Ms. Silveira de Macedo. It is unclear when the religious parish was eventually elevated to civil parish, owing to the rarity of records.

Between February and June 1718 the region was hit by violent volcanic eruption, necessitating the removal of the Blessed Sacrament from the sanctuary, first to the Hermitage of Santo António, then later to the Hermitage of São Bartolomeu in the locality of Silveira (Lajes do Pico). It was only on November 2, 1719, that the reliquary and images were returned to the hermitage of Santo António, following a lit procession, since the primitive church in Arruda was completely destroyed by lavas from the eruption. Today, the site is marked by a modest cross over mound of lava. Another eruption occurred in 1720 that isolated the community: after the 1718 a lava field had intersected the only connection to São Mateus, and in 1720, another lava field had cut off access to Lajes. These fields, apart from restricting access to the community, also inundated the productive agricultural lands, coming to be referred to as terrenos brejeiros or poor terrains.

The rebuilding of the parochial church of Arruda began shortly after the volcanic eruptions and ceased with the inauguration in 1726, when the image of São João was transferred from its sheltered hermitage to the new temple, following a grand procession. By 1829, this new church had outlived its parishioners, and through the initiative of its zealous parish priest, Father Silveira Bulcão, a new church was constructed, with the assistance of donations from the faithful in the Misericórdia of Horta. Father Bulcão did not see the completion of the church (because he was transferred to Madalena), but it was eventually completed under the stewardship of Father Francisco Joaquim Coluna in 1848. Its current appearance came from 1901, under designer Miguel António, and supervised by Father Manuel Garcia da Rosa.

== Geography ==
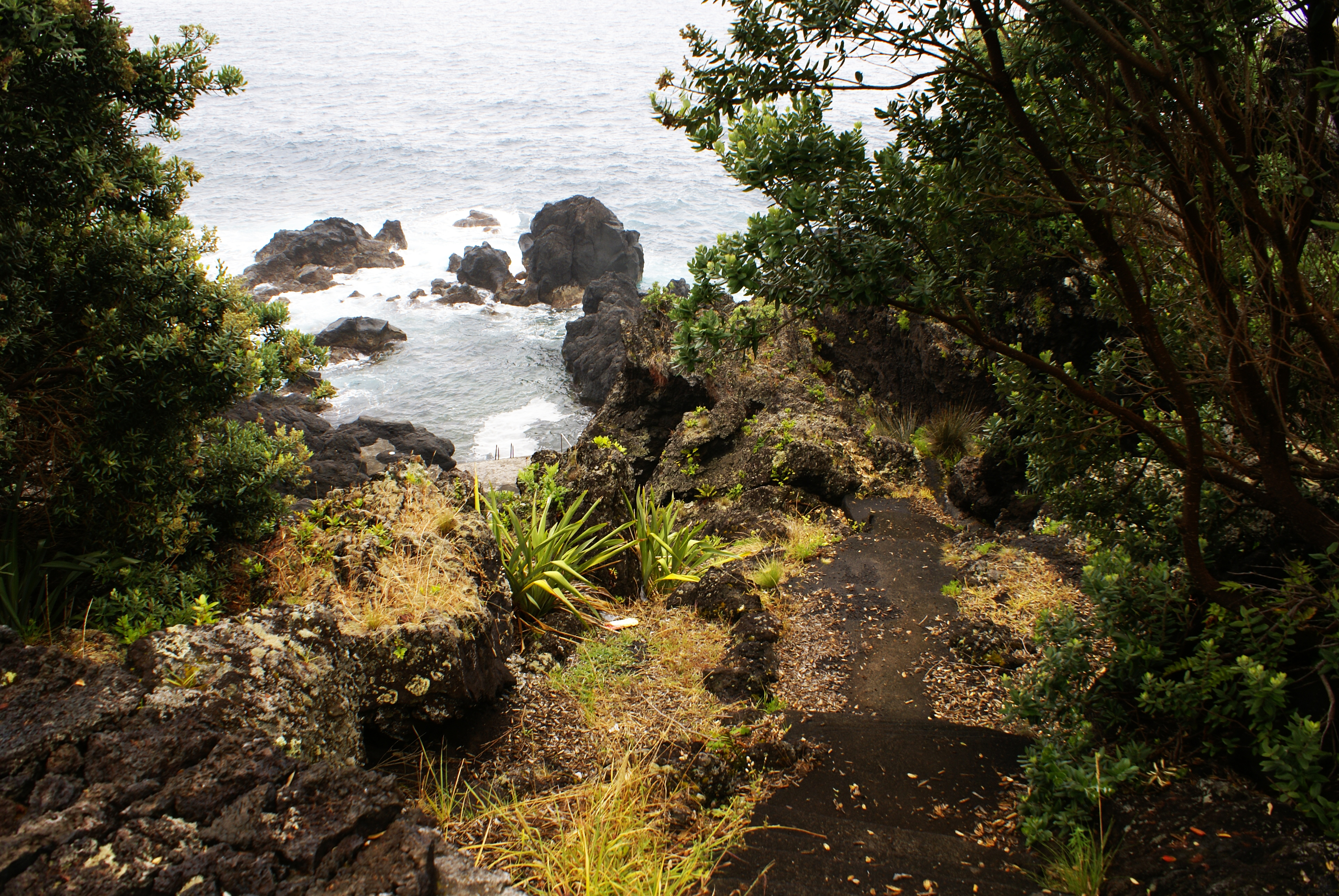
The coastal swimming area of Arinhas, along the southern coast

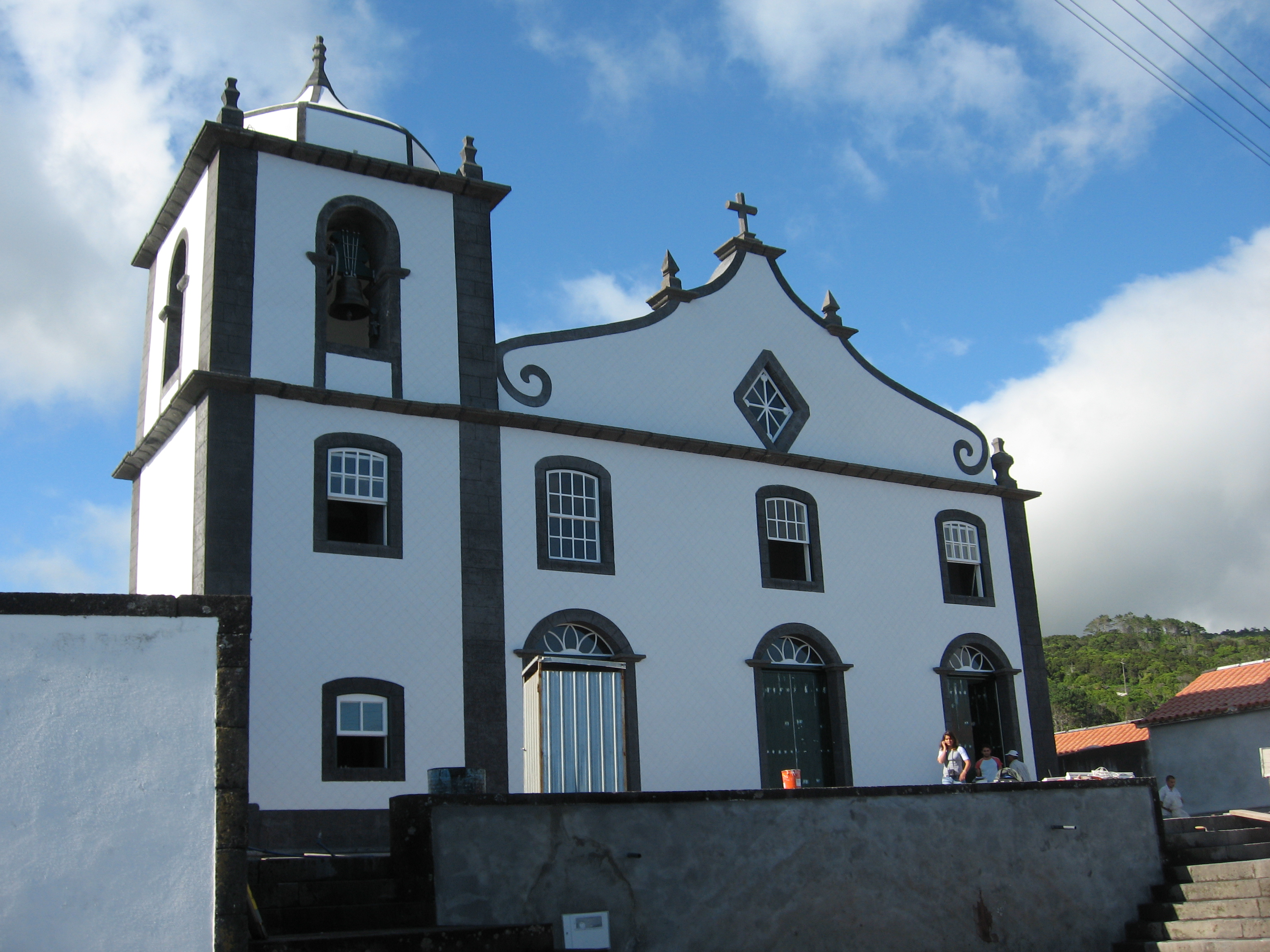
After renovations and remodeling

The village of Sao Joao is located on the main roadway (Estrada Regional E.R.1-1ª) between hamlets of Terra do Pao (São Caetano) and Silveira (Lajes do Pico). São João comprises two distinct communities, the upper (Companhia de Cima) and lower (Companhia de Baixo) portions of the village.

The single-bell tower parochial church is in the lower district in close proximity to the small sea port. It was extensively renovated following historical earthquakes, with a tiled front-facade constructed over quarried rock. A secondary chapel was constructed within the past decades to support the upper congregation in a modernist style. A park was also constructed around the lava flows that destroyed the original church (in 1720).

The village of Sao Joao is a quiet community that includes a cafe/mercantile shop, restaurants, an auto repair garage (in the location of the former village blacksmith's shop), and a commercial cheese factory. Being primarily agricultural community now (as whaling was discontinued in the 1970s), most of the grassing lands are located in the mid-altitudes, as dense vegetation dominate the top of the mountainous Achada Plain and Pico Volcano. Other landmarks include a small chapel used for the Holy Spirit feasts, in each of the upper and lower villages, and village squares constructed (such as the Largo de São João) to provide picnicking facilities, playgrounds and animal pens. Along the seashore, Ponta do Admoiro, provides a sand volleyball court, showers and picnic facilities adjacent to a point projecting out in the ocean, with small tidal pools and natural swimming area.

== Economy ==
Whaling has been a vital industry in the district until recently, and the port of São João relied on the industry for its development. The clear and deep harbor supported the industry, allowing the commercialization of hundreds of whales annually.
