= Ribeiras =

- Civil parish
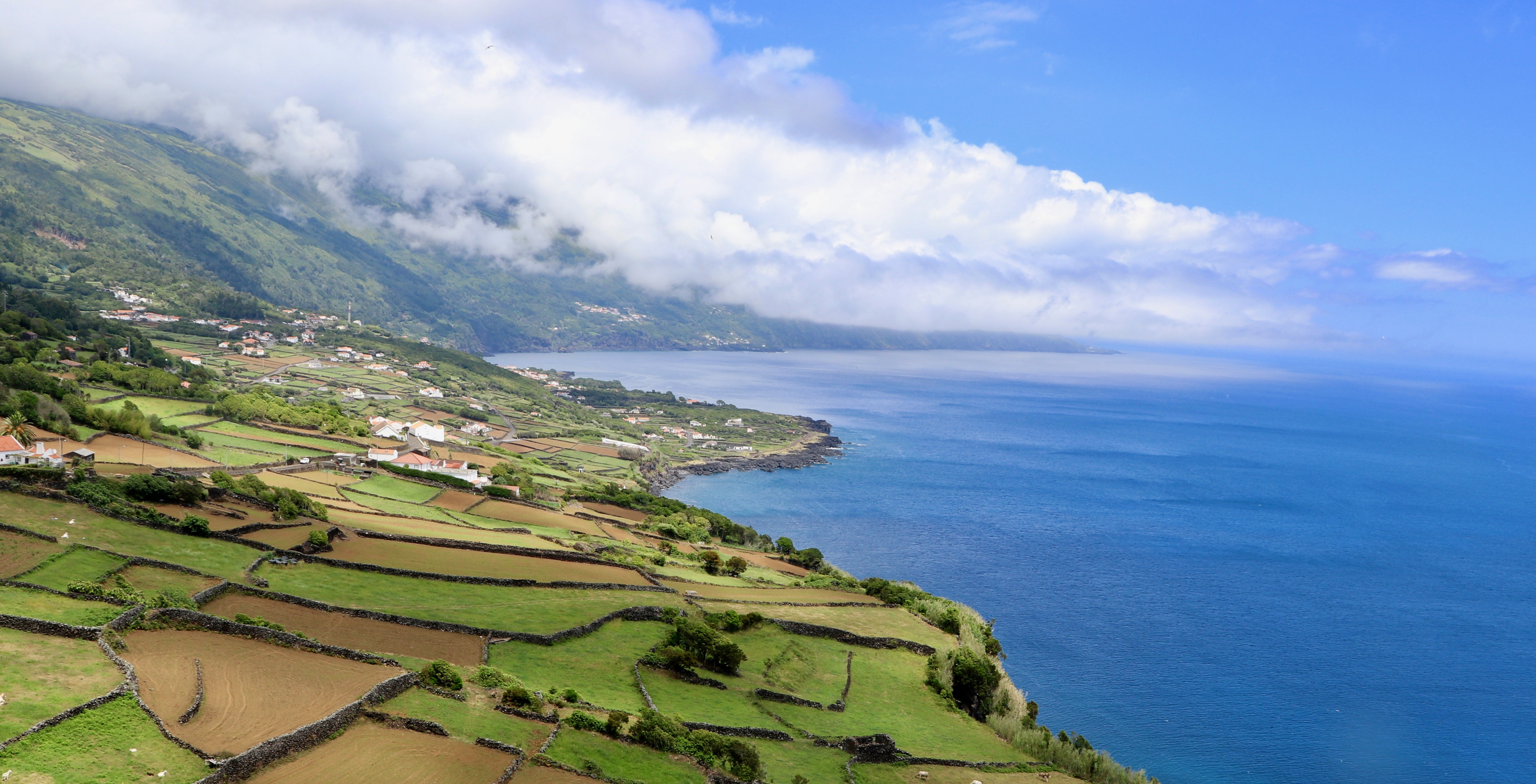
- From the border with Lajes do Pico, the vista of the parish of Ribeiras towards Piedade

- Location of Ribeiras in the municipality of Lajes do Pico within Pico Island
- Coordinates: 38°24′15″N 28°11′23″W
- Country: Portugal
- Auton. region: Azores
- Island: Pico
- Municipality: Lajes do Pico
- Established: Settlement: c. 1460

Area
  - Total: 34.17 km^{2} (13.19 sq mi)
- Elevation: 9 m (30 ft)

Population (2011)
  - Total: 925
  - Density: 27.1/km^{2} (70.1/sq mi)
- Time zone: UTC−01:00 (AZOT)
  - Summer (DST): UTC+00:00 (AZOST)
- Postal code: 9930-308
- Area code: 292
- Patron: Blessed Virgin Mary
- Website: www.jf-ribeiras.pt

Ribeiras is a civil parish in the municipality of Lajes do Pico in the Azores. The population in 2011 was 925, in an area of 34.17 km^{2}. It contains the localities Cabeços, Caminho de Cima, Canto, Cruz, Ladeira do Capitão, Pontas Negras, Manchillas, Outeiros, Ribeira Grande, Ribeira Seca, Ribeiras and Santa Bárbara.

== History ==
The first navigators dropped anchor in the deep waters of the Bay of Ribeiras around 1460, taking advantage of the numerous ravines that descended from the mountains of the north. These early settlers were primarily fisherman, constructing boats and working during the day, and populating some areas near access to potable water. In 1502, countrymen of Fernão Álvares Evangelho, the first settler of Lajes, arrived in the area of Santa Cruz and joined-up with Fernão Álvares following many of the paths and trails originally travelled by animals deposited on the island by Infante D. Henriques's early exploration fleets. One of the first settlements, Santa Cruz was an homage of faith to those fishers that returned successfully every year, after living off the sea, on long voyages, hunting whale, fishing for tuna and other species. Other settlers cultivated the patchwork of parcels, growing corn, constructing mills in many of the ravines, and raising cattle to support, initially, a subsistence lifestyle. These early settlers constructed a chapel to the invocation of Nossa Senhora do Socorro, though they eventually constructed a new Church to honor Santa Barbara, which gave its name to the new community in the 16th Century.

During the Liberalist Wars, on April 21, 1831, a military division commanded by the Count of Villafor, disembarked in the port of Ribeiras. This was part of a concerted attempt to take the island of Faial:

"The Liberal troops crossed the parish until reaching Madalena, in the intention of taking the island of Faial. During the passage they practiced clear acts of vandalism, in addition to the impositions that they made on the populous, that they furnish meat and other elements..."

Wooden ships, such as the Carmona and Salazar, owned by Master João Alves, marked the life and socio-economic activity of the settlements, marked by the exchange of produce from the land and fish caught in the sea. It was in Ribeiras that the first boats were launched to link inter-island commerce, such as the Andorinha (launched in 1915) and the Ribeirense (launched in 1916), the first motorized yacht to circulate in the waters of the Azores.

== Geography ==
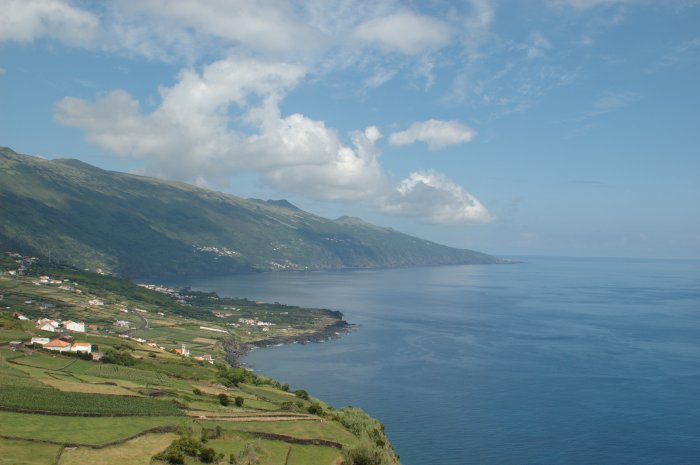
Santa Cruz das Ribeiras, and the vista towards to the eastern coast of Pico

The parish of Ribeiras is an administrative division extending from the parish of Lajes do Pico in the west to Piedade along the eastern coast. It consists of mountainous hills that slope into the Atlantic Ocean, and includes several ravines and river-valleys. Towards the interior, there are many craters and spatter cones that comprise the portions of the Achada Plain and the Topo Volcanic Complex. These lands are primarily peat-bogs and populated by scrub vegetation, as well as lake-filled depressions or cones, such as Lagoa do Paul (in the northeastern corner of the parish).

The first settlements were established in the semi-regular plain in the area of Santa Cruz (in the western part of the parish). As growth occurred, new settlements popped-up along the flanks of the mountain, around Arrife, expanding along the Caminho de Cima and Caminho de Baixo, and farther along the roads to the localities of Pontas Negras, Ribeira Seca and Ribeira Grande.
