= Mvm =

MVM TV
- Country: Portugal

Programming
- Language: Portuguese
- Picture format: 4:3 (576i, SDTV)

Ownership
- Owner: NexTV (TVTEL/ZON Multimédia)
- Sister channels: Regiões TV

History
- Launched: 23 February 2008; 17 years ago
- Closed: 3 November 2020; 4 years ago

Links
- Website: mvmtv.net

Availability

Terrestrial
- NOS: Channel 158

MVM (stylised in lower case as mvm) was a Portuguese digital cable thematic television channel. MVM stands for Moda, Vida e Música (Fashion, Life and Music). It was launched as a website in April 2007. It was then later expanded into a television channel on 23 February 2008, and MVM closed on 3 November 2020, with its license revoked in December.

MVM was a channel largely devoted to live stand-up comedy shows across various cities, music videos, fashion, nightlife, as well as extreme sports. The channel was founded and is operated by TVTEL, a former cable and satellite operator which also owned a regional channel, RTV.
