= Global Media Group =

Portuguese media holding company

- Type: Media group
- Industry: Print Media, Radio broadcasting, Telecommunication
- Founded: 1990 (as Lusomundo Media); 2005 (as Controlinveste); 2014 (as Global Media Group)
- Headquarters: Lisbon
- Key people: Marco Galinha (President) José Pedro Soeiro Afonso Camões Domingos de Andrade Guilherme Pinheiro Kevin Ho Phillip Yip
- Products: Newspapers, Radio, Internet
- Owner: KNJ Global Holdings Limited (35.25%); Páginas Civilizadas, Lda. (29.75%); José Pedro Carvalho Reis Soeiro (24.5%); Grandes Notícias, Lda. (10.5%)
- Website: www.globalmediagroup.pt

Global Media Group (called Global Media and formerly named Controlinveste Media and Lusomundo Media) is a Portuguese media holding company founded by Portuguese sports mogul and FC Porto SAD's shareholder Joaquim Oliveira.

== History and profile ==
Global Media Group has its origins in Olivedesportos, a company founded in 1990 by Joaquim Oliveira and in the privatizations of DN and JN. In the early 1990s, businessman Luís Silva transformed himself into the media sector as the winner of the privatizations of DN and JN. TSF Rádio Notícias, founded by a group of journalists, is the last media outlet to join the Lusomundo group, which acquired the majority of TSF in 1994.

Global Media Group has held interests in the area of television broadcasting rights for the main professional football competitions in Portugal, as well as sponsorship and sports advertising rights. In 1994, Global Media Group acquired its first press title, the sports newspaper O Jogo. In 1998, he launched Sport TV, in partnership with RTP and PT Multimédia, a subscription television channel.

In 2001, the former Controlinveste created, in partnership with Portugal Telecom, the company Sportinveste Multimedia, responsible for managing digital and multimedia operations at two of the three main football clubs in Portugal (F.C. Porto and Sporting), as well as other websites dedicated to the distribution of informative and multimedia content in the area of sport. Given the great success of this television channel exclusively dedicated to sport, all of them in high definition: Sport TV2, Sport TV3, Sport TV Live, Sport TV Africa, Sport TV Golfe and Sport TV Américas.

After the acquisition of Lusomundo in 2005, the Controlinveste group gathered offers in the media area in Portugal, which includes Sport TV and the news radio TSF, in addition to press titles such as JN, DN, 24 Horas, O Jogo, Global Notícias; other titles such as the newspaper Ocasião; in the regional press, Açoriano Oriental (the oldest newspaper in Portugal), Jornal do Fundão, Diário de Notícias da Madeira; the magazines Evasões, Volta ao Mundo and also a shareholding in the Lusa agency.

To support the printed publications business, Global Media Group had a presence in the printing sector through two graphic companies (Funchalense, in Lisbon and NavePrinter, in Porto) as well as in the distribution sector, through two companies, Vasp in distribution at points of sale and Notícias Direct, focused on door-to-door distribution of newspapers and magazines.

In addition, Global Media Group also had several financial interests in sports corporations and telecommunications companies. He controls an operation in the tourism sector, the Cosmos travel agency, which has an e-commerce portal.

In October 2012, Joaquim Oliveira formalized the sale of the group to a group of Angolan investors.

In 2013, Controlinveste was sold partly inter alia to Angolan investor António Mosquito Mbakassi (27.5%), representing a group of investors from Angola. The other parts were sold to Luís Montez (15%), BCP (15%) and BES (15%). Founder and owner Joaquim Oliveira keeps the remaining 27.5%. The deal included all of its print media and a radio station, which are DN, JN, O Jogo, Açoriano Oriental and TSF. The deal was financially advised by Banco Privado Atlântico. The group's financial difficulties, mainly due to high liabilities, forced Joaquim Oliveira to cede control of the group. António Mosquito and Luís Montez were the new shareholders. The new shareholding structure was designed to restructure Controlinveste Media and increase its share capital. This operation did not include Sport TV.

On 17 December 2014, Controlinveste unveiled their new identity as Global Media Group and officially took the new name on 12 January 2015.

== Grupo BEL ==
In September 2020, the Global Media Group reached an agreement with Grupo BEL, owned by businessman Marco Galinha, for its entry as a shareholder in the company. The Grupo BEL was founded in 2001 by Marco Galinha and operates in various sectors as vending machines, aeronautics and media (through Jornal Económico in 2018). Marco Galinha is the executive president and chairman of the board of directors of the Grupo BEL.

Marco Galinha was a member of the CES – Conselho Económico Social (2016–2019), member of the CIP – Confederação Empresarial de Portugal (2016–2019) and Vice President of ANJE – Associação Nacional de Jovens Empresários (2016–2019). Becomes President of Global Media Group in February 2021.

Holders of 5% or more of the company's capital are as follows:

- KNJ Global Holdings Limited – 35.25%
- Páginas Civilizadas, Lda. – 29.75%
- José Pedro Carvalho Reis Soeiro – 24.5%
- Grandes Notícias, Lda. – 10.5%

== Financial situation in 2023 ==
On December 6, in an internal statement, the Global Media Group Executive Committee, led by José Paulo Fafe, announced that it would urgently negotiate layoffs with 150 to 200 workers and move forward with a restructuring that it said was necessary to avoid "the more than foreseeable bankruptcy of the group".

Meanwhile, the management of Jornal de Notícias, TSF, O Jogo and Dinheiro Vivo have resigned, following the restructuring process.

Global Media Group also announced that it will stop paying December salaries, and says it cannot even give a deadline for making this payment.
