= Bragatel =

Portuguese telecommunications company

Bragatel was a Portuguese telecommunications company with coverage in the city of Braga from 1994 to 2009. It was acquired by ZON Multimédia in 2008 and ceased providing its own services in 2009.

== History ==
Bragatel was registered on 11 November 1993 and started its service in October 1994 in a few zones of the city of Braga and in 1996 had joined the APOCABO association as a founding member. It started providing cable internet services in April 1998, the first company in Portugal to do so.

The company had a Fixed Wireless Access license, but, in July 2000, Media Capital sued the company for breach of contract.

Broadcasts of Fox started on 2 March 2005, two months before TV Cabo.

The sale of the company was announced in 2007, raising concerns over a possible monopoly. The sale was approved by the Competition Authority on 24 November 2008, alongside TVTEL and Pluricanal.

The company's FWA license was revoked on 24 August 2009.
