= Lajes do Pico =

- Municipality
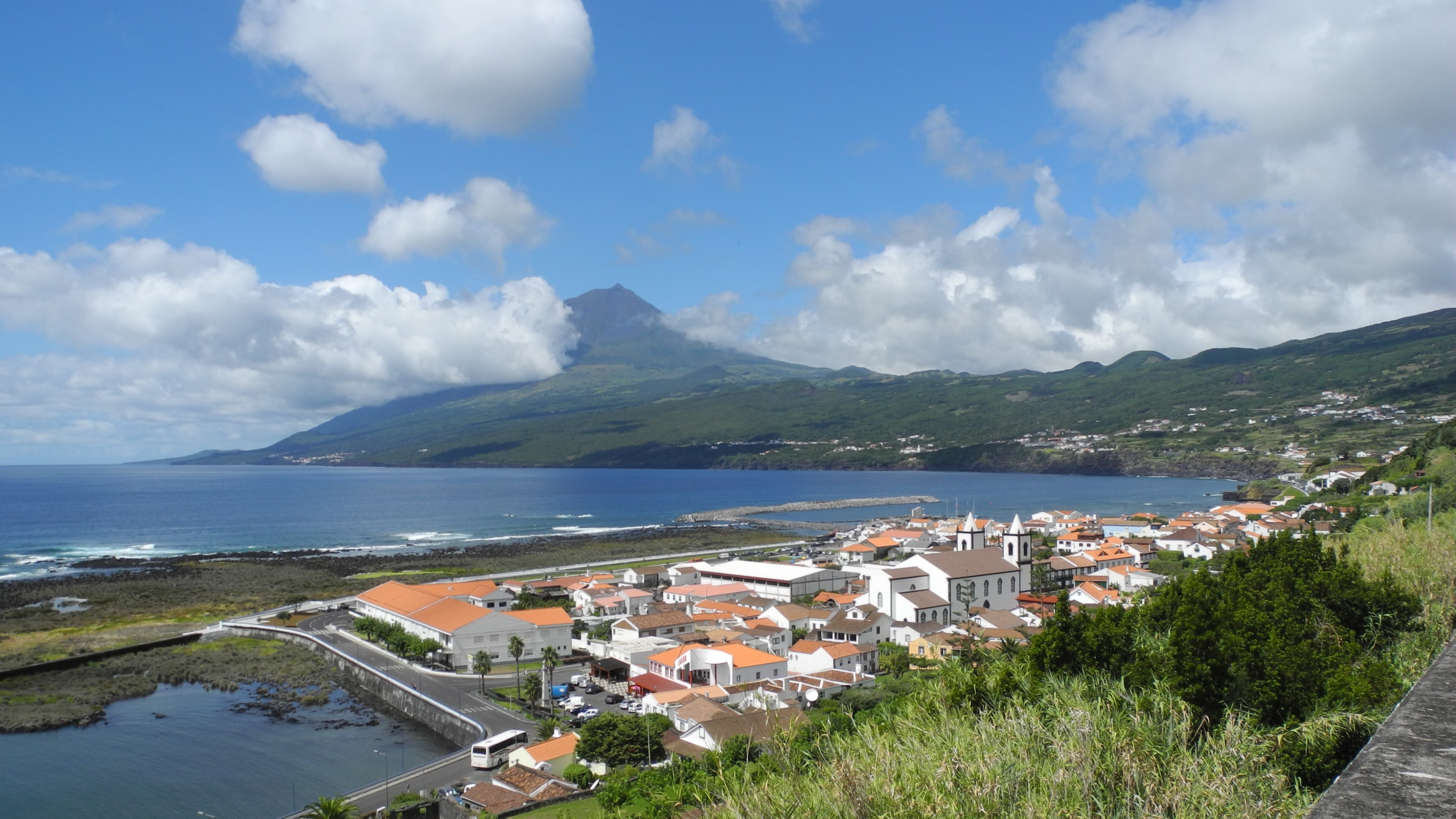
- View of the Lajes Bay

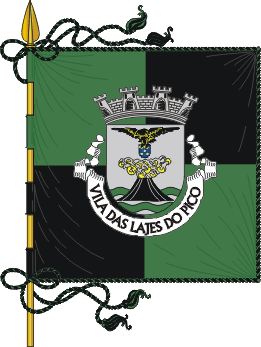
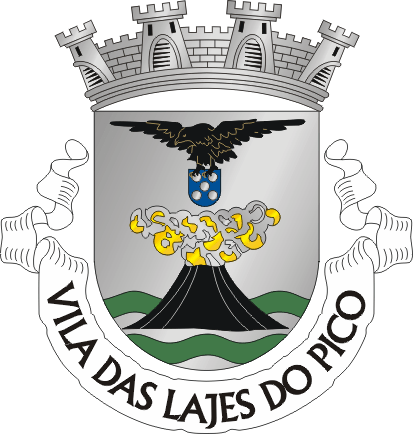
- Flag Coat of arms
- Interactive map of Lajes do Pico
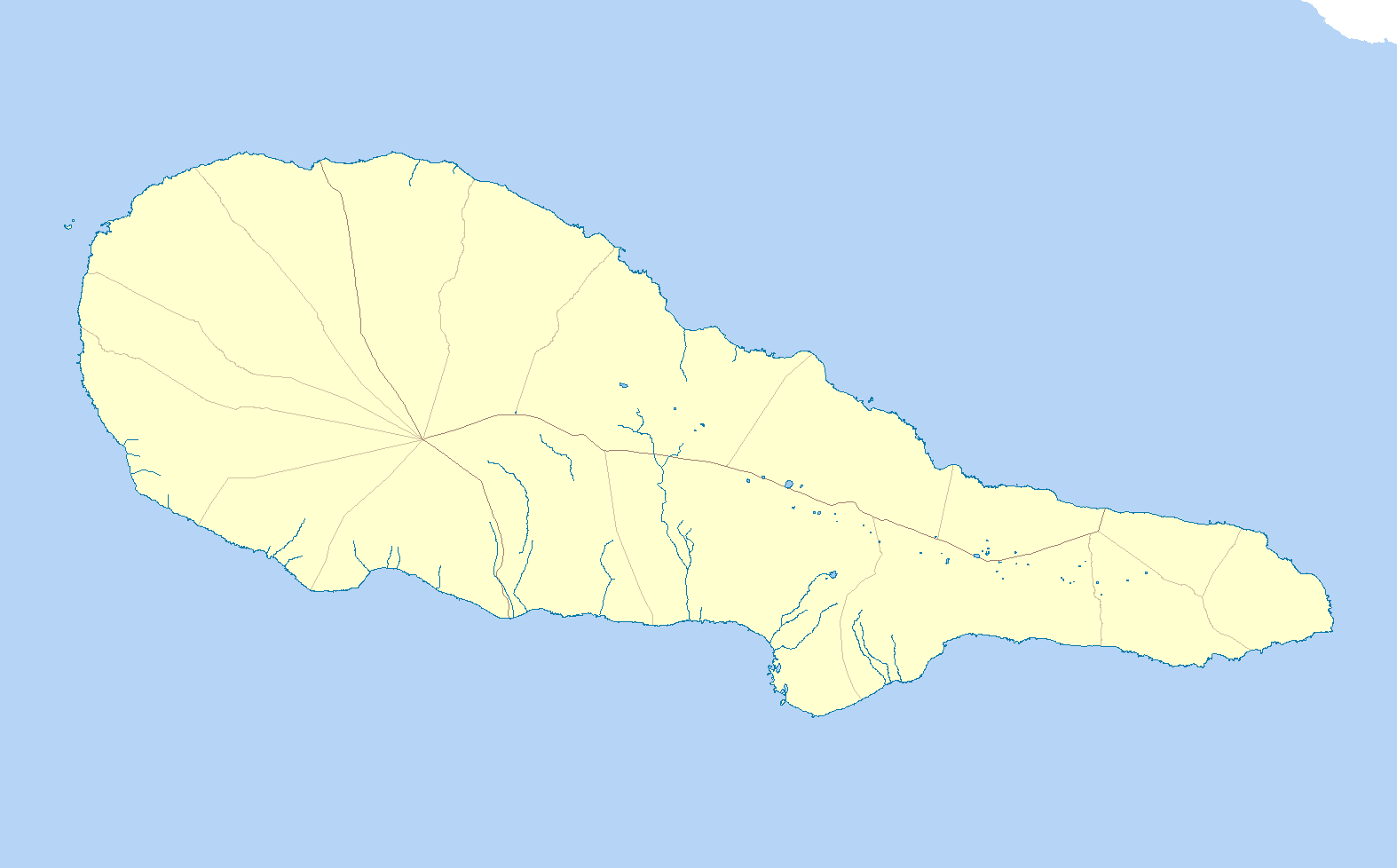
- Location in the Azores Lajes do Pico (Pico)
- Coordinates: 38°23′49″N 28°13′56″W
- Country: Portugal
- Auton. region: Azores
- Island: Pico
- Established: Settlement: c. 1460; Municipality: c. 1501
- Parishes: 6

Government
  - President: Ana Catarina Terra Brum (PS)

Area
  - Total: 155.31 km^{2} (59.97 sq mi)
- Highest elevation: 2,351 m (7,713 ft)
- Lowest elevation: 0 m (0 ft)

Population (2021)
  - Total: 4,342 ▼
  - Density: 27.96/km^{2} (72.41/sq mi)
- Time zone: UTC−01:00 (AZOT)
  - Summer (DST): UTC+00:00 (AZOST)
- Postal code: 9930-135
- Area code: (+351) 292 XXX-XXXX
- Patron: Nossa Senhora de Lourdes
- Local holiday: 29 June
- Website: cm-lajesdopico.pt

Lajes do Pico (Portuguese pronunciation: [ˈlaʒɨʒ ðu ˈpiku]) is a town and municipality in the central Azores. It is one of three municipalities of the island of Pico. It has 4,342 inhabitants as of 2021, in an area of 155.31 km^{2}. It is bordered by Madalena to the west and by São Roque do Pico to the north.

== History ==
The first settlement to be established on the southern part of the island of along Penedo Negro, in the cove of Castelete (south of the actual town of Lajes) sometime around 1460. The rough seas at the time only allowed the navigator Fernando Álvares Evangelho to offload at the time, and he and his dog would occupy the land near the ravine (along the western edge of the town) for many years: the ravine of potable water took its name Ribeira Fernado Álvares from this early colonist. His former residence still remains near the site. When his colleagues arrived later, they disembarked farther east in the area designated Santa Cruz das Ribeiras. A few remain at this site, including Jordão Álvares Caralta, while other stayed along the coast, near Maré (named for the local tidal pool). In addition to their homes, they constructed the small Hermitage of São Pedro, where its first priest was friar Pedro Gigante, whom some historians consider the first person to introduce the Verdelho caste to the islands.

The town of Lajes never received a foral (charter) typical of continental settlements; in 1500, the first municipal chamber was composed of various good men of stature in the community and by charter (dated 14 May 1501) the Captain-Donatary Jôs d'Utra conferred power and authority to Fernando Álvares to assigned licenses to various settlers in his name, for the monarchy of Portugal. Lajes was the first municipality on Pico and, until 1542, the only one on the island. Lacerda Machado, in Espelho Cristalino estimated that the population was no more than about 250 inhabitants by 1506. From this point, Lajes do Pico was constituted by a few parishes: among them were São João, Santíssima Trindade (Lajes do Pico), Calheta de Nesquim and Piedade. In 1540, the municipality of Lajes (which constituted all of the island) included the parishes of Santa Bárbara (Ribeiras), Santíssima Trindade (Lajes), São Mateus, Santa Maria Madalena, São Roque e Nossa Senhora da Ajuda. Over time, though, this island-wide governmental authority would be ceded to local constituent authorities, as the populations grew and demanded autonomy from distant Lajes, who understood little of their regional demands. In 1542, King D. John III decided to divide the municipal in two, constituting the municipality of Vila Nova de São Roque, with its parishes of São Roque (seat of municipal authority), Nossa Senhora da Ajuda and Madalena. Its first constituent assembly was seated in 1543. It would be several decades before the municipality of Madalena would be a distinct local authority: on 8 March 1723, the parishes of Madalena (town), Bandeiras and São Mateus would become its own authority. Extinguished in 1895, the municipality would nevertheless be reestablished on 13 January 1898 by royal decree.

Álvaro de Ornelas, then the first Captain-Donatary for the island of Pico (similar to a Civil Governor) never arrived on the island, and never took power. Jôs d'Utra (Jobst de Van Huertere), then Donatary-Captain of Faial, took over this role in 1482, as the Captaincy of Pico.

When the first men arrived on the Island, the found a raised stone, that was vomitted by the volcanoes: colossal stones, huddled at random, like those which are loosened over the pebbles and cliffs of the coast. But the bastards raised their foreheads. They were men...They smashed, excavated, removed stone, opened paths...and the earth began to rise!

On 15 September 1980, by decree of the regional assembly of the Azores (24/80/A), the civil parish of Ribeirinha was de-annexed from the territory of Piedade to form its own autonomous parish.

== Geography ==
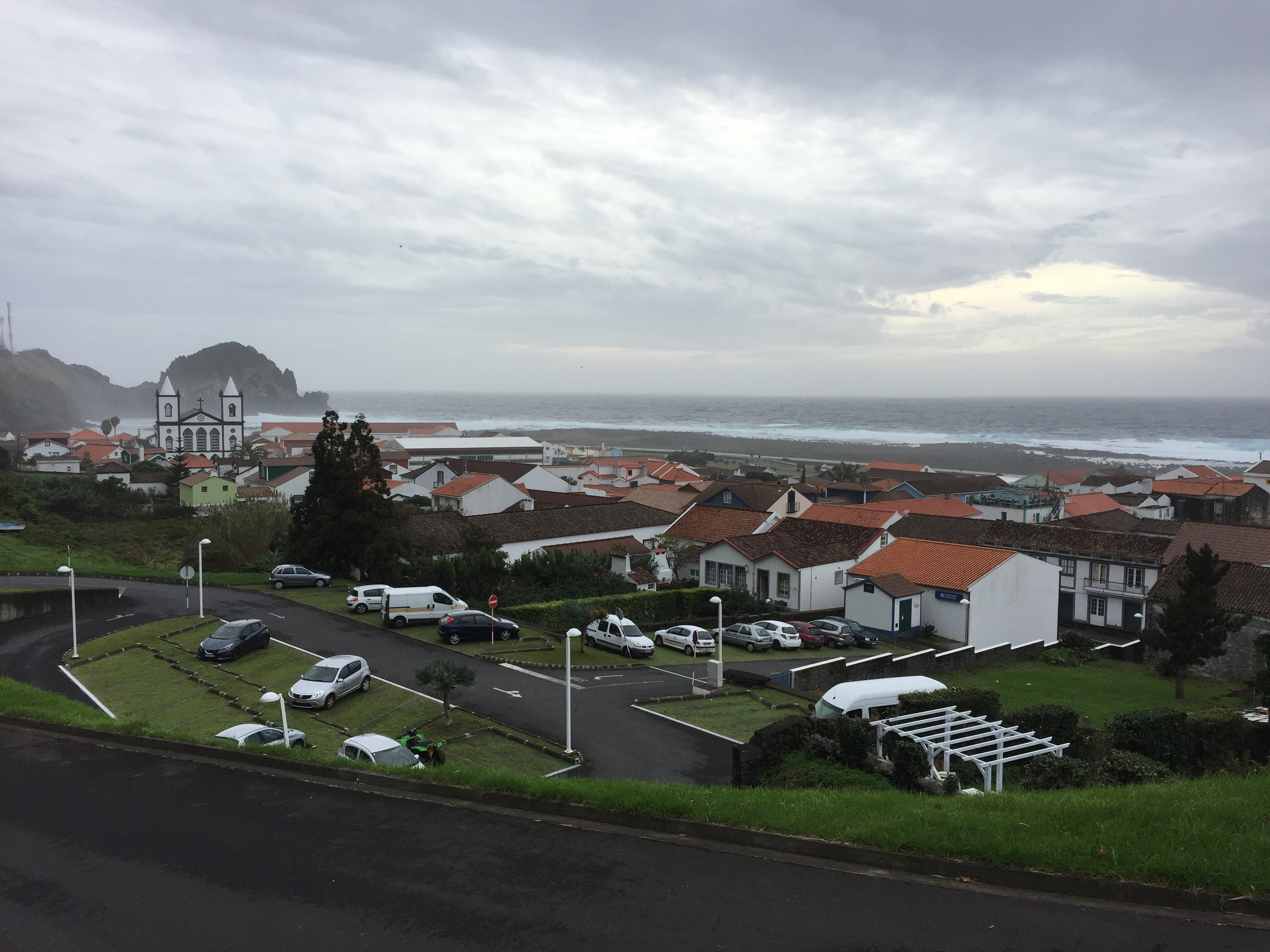

The six civil parishes form the municipality of Lajes do Pico, with their own local authority, including:

- Calheta de Nesquim
- Lajes do Pico
- Piedade
- Ribeiras
- Ribeirinha
- São João
