= Piedade (Lajes do Pico) =

- Civil parish
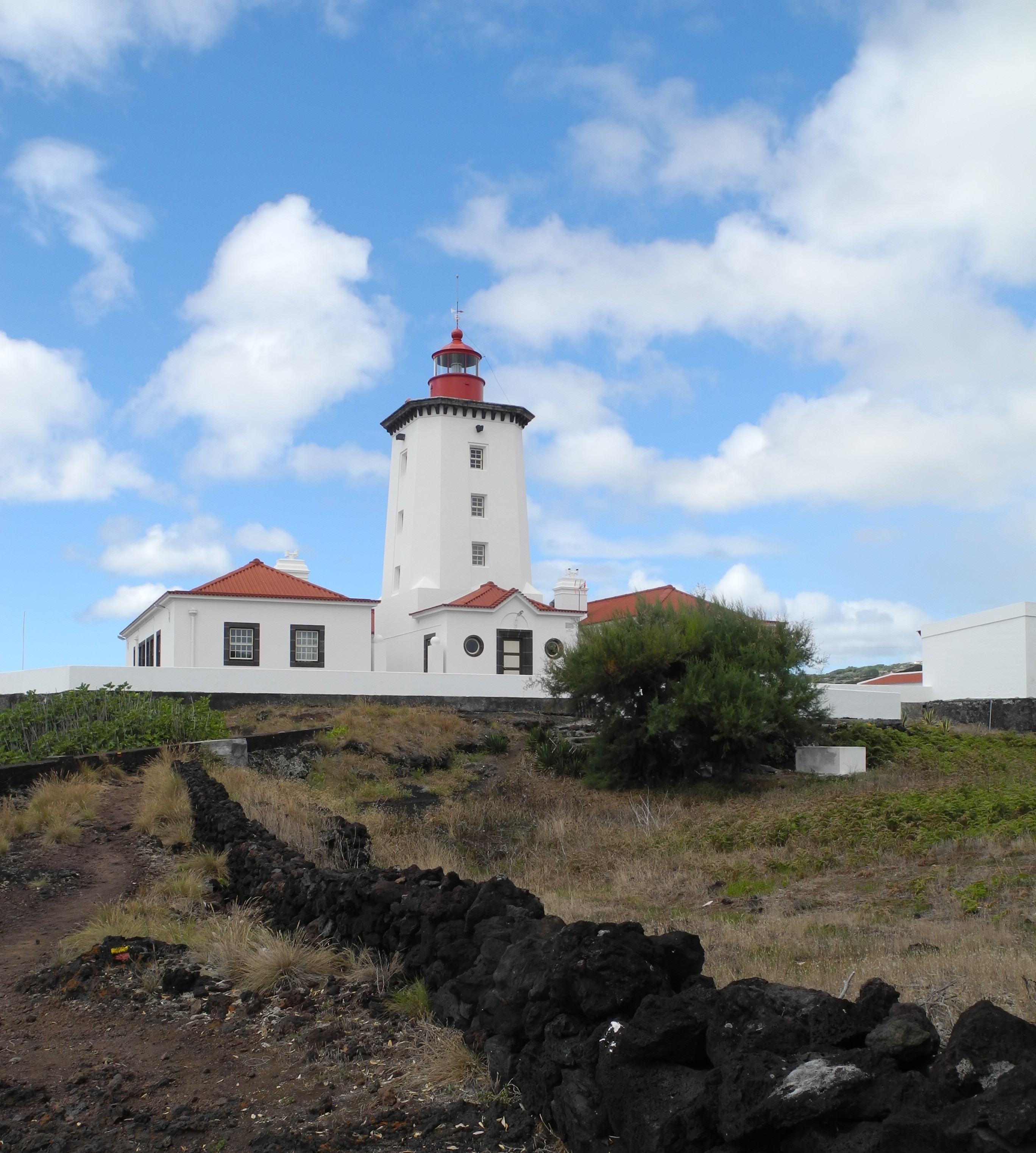
- Facing into the eastern coast, the lighthouse of Manhenha is the last building in Ponta da Ilha, in the parish of Piedade

- Location of Piedade in the municipality of Lajes do Pico within Pico Island
- Coordinates: 38°25′17″N 28°3′37″W
- Country: Portugal
- Auton. region: Azores
- Island: Pico
- Municipality: Lajes do Pico

Area
  - Total: 12.81 km^{2} (4.95 sq mi)
- Elevation: 178 m (584 ft)

Population (2011)
  - Total: 844
  - Density: 65.9/km^{2} (171/sq mi)
- Time zone: UTC−01:00 (AZOT)
  - Summer (DST): UTC+00:00 (AZOST)
- Postal code: 9930-206
- Area code: 292
- Patron: Blessed Virgin Mary

Piedade is a civil parish in the municipality of Lajes do Pico on the island of Pico, the Portuguese Azores. The population in 2011 was 844, in an area of 12.81 km^{2}.

== History ==
The parish was founded after 1506, from the historical registers of the time.

The 1755 Lisbon earthquake affected the community, resulting in the destruction of many homes and the parochial church of the time. Before their destruction by phylloxera plague, the vineyards in this location were great producers of the popular Verdelho wines, becoming one of the more important agricultural centres on the island.

The Direcção de Serviços de Conservação da Natureza do Pico (Service Directorate of the Natural Conservancy of Pico) and Serviço de Ambiente do Pico (Environmental Services of Pico) were installed in the Parque Florestal Matos Souto (Forest Park Matos Souto), a park dedicated to commander Manuel Matos Souto, an emigrante who departed for Brazil in the 19th century, where he made his fortune (resending his monies home in order to buy land on the island).

== Geography ==
Piedade is located on the extreme east coast of Pico, bordering the parishes of Calheta de Nesquim and Ribeirinha, and connected by the Regional E.R.1-1ª roadway to other centers on the island. The parish is divided into three distinct zones (Piedade, Calhau and Manhenha), and includes two fishing ports (Port of Manhenha and Porto of Calhau), in addition to swimming areas in the areas of Baía da Engrade, Baía do Céu de Abraão, Baía da Caravela and Baía da Fonte. The parishes includes several localities, that includes smaller non-political communities within the civil parish, including: Altamora, Areal, Biscoito Queimado, Cabecinho, Castelete, Eiras, Galego, Calhau, Cruz do Redondo, Curral da Pedra, Engrade, Faias, Fetais, Manhenha and Ponta da Ilha.

== Architecture ==
The patrimony of the parish is diverse, although the primary buildings are the parochial church and hermitage, the curious fishing boat shelters, windmills and lighthouse. The following were classified by IGESPAR as buildings of public interest:

=== Civic ===
- Lighthouse of Ponta da Ilha (Portuguese: Farol de Ponta da Ilha), originally proposed in 1883, the lighthouse was only built in the mid-20th century, in lands ceded by Maria Adelaide Gomes, Paulina Gomes Ávila and their husbands for 200$00, rural lands in Calvino.

=== Religious ===
- Church of Nossa Senhora da Piedade (Portuguese: Igreja da Nossa Senhora da Piedade), the original church was built in 1506, but destroyed following the 1755 Lisbon earthquake, resulting in the construction of the present building after 1756.
