= Ribeirinha (Lajes do Pico) =

- Civil parish
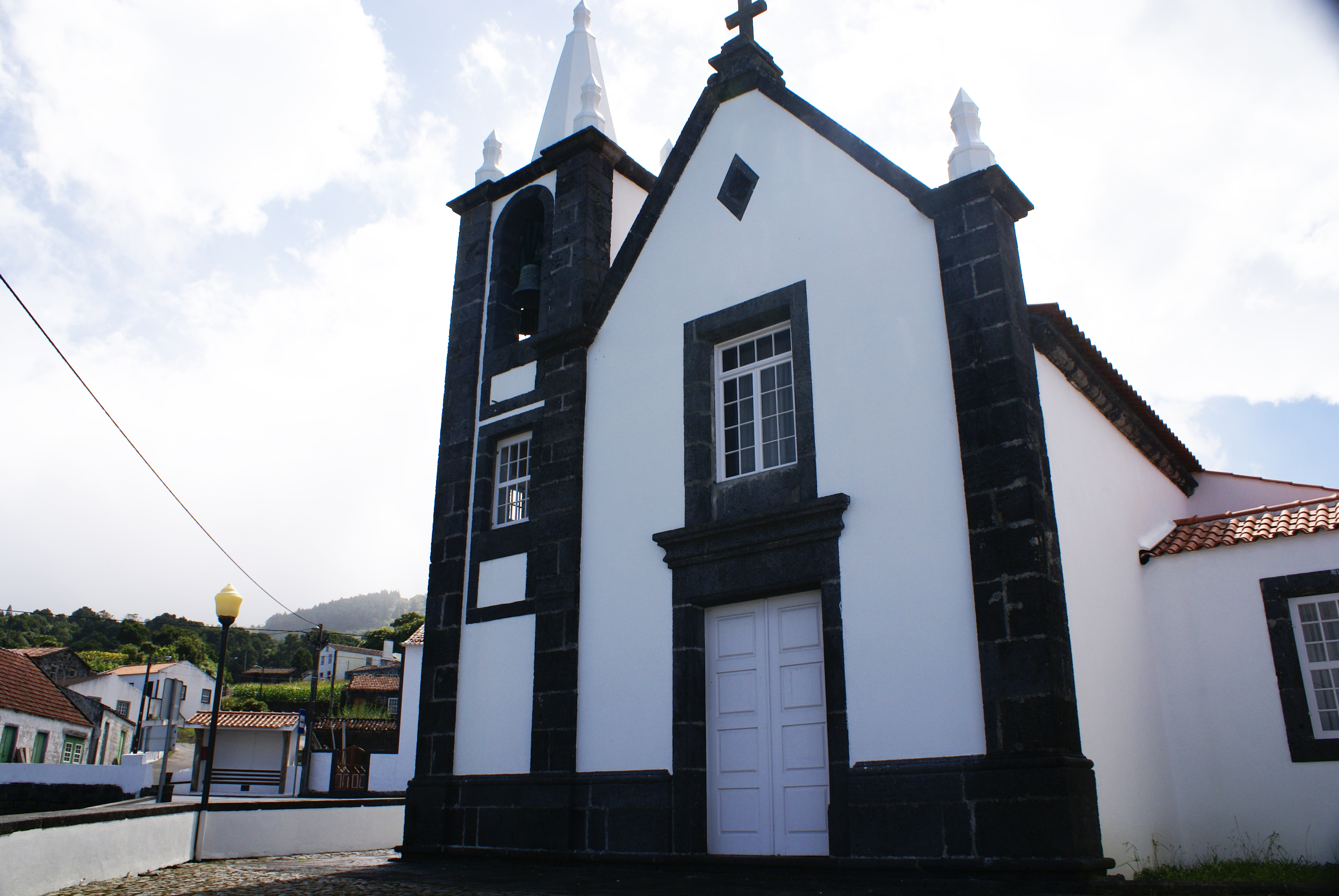
- Church of Ribeirinha

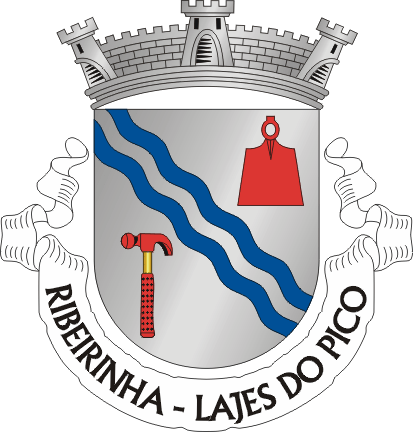
- Coat of arms

- Location of Ribeirinha in the municipality of Lajes do Pico within Pico Island
- Coordinates: 38°26′18″N 28°5′17″W
- Country: Portugal
- Auton. region: Azores
- Island: Pico
- Municipality: Lajes do Pico
- Established: Civil parish: 15 September 1980

Area
  - Total: 8.49 km^{2} (3.28 sq mi)
- Elevation: 207 m (679 ft)

Population (2011)
  - Total: 374
  - Density: 44.1/km^{2} (114/sq mi)
- Time zone: UTC−01:00 (AZOT)
  - Summer (DST): UTC+00:00 (AZOST)
- Postal code: 9930-336
- Area code: 292
- Patron: Santo Antão

Ribeirinha is a civil parish in the municipality of Lajes do Pico in the Portuguese Autonomous Region of the Azores. It is the only parish in the municipality to be totally on the northern coast of the island. The population in 2011 was 374, in an area of 8.49 km^{2}. It is the smallest parish in the municipality by area. It contains the localities Baixa, Biscoito, Ribeirinha and Terra Alta.

== History ==
It was established in 1980, when it was carved from the neighboring civil parish of Piedade, with which it shares its border on the eastern coast.
