= Jornal de Notícias =

Daily newspaper in Porto, Portugal

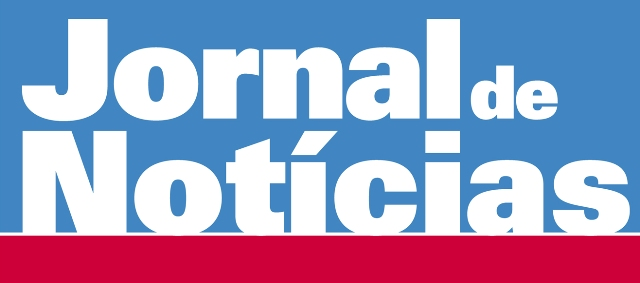

- The 27 December 2007 front page of Jornal de Notícias
- Type: Daily newspaper
- Format: Berliner
- Owner: Global Media Group
- Editor: Domingos de Andrade
- Founded: 21 June 1888
- Language: Portuguese
- Headquarters: Porto
- Circulation: 65,403 (September–October 2013)
- ISSN: 0874-1352
- Website: jn.pt

Jornal de Notícias (Portuguese pronunciation: [ʒuɾˈnal dɨ nuˈtisjɐʃ]; lit. 'News Journal'; shortened to JN) is a Portuguese daily national newspaper, one of the oldest in Portugal.

== History and profile ==
JN was founded in Porto and was first published on 21 June 1888. It was one of two Portuguese newspapers published in Angola during the colonial rule. The other was Diário Popular. JN has since become one of the most popular newspapers, especially after the Carnation Revolution.

Following the Carnation revolution, JN was nationalized and later privatized in the early 1990s. Then the paper and Diário de Notícias were sold to the Lusomundo group. In 2005 the Controlinveste group bought papers. Both papers are now owned by Global Media Group, which was named Controlinveste Media until January 2015.

In 1995 JN started its online version, being one of the first two Portuguese newspapers in this regard. Since the late 1990s the paper has provided several gifts as a way to retain and attract new readers. It could offer various gifts, such as collectible fascicles and cutlery.

JN is published in four editions: National, Centre, Minho, and South. Its editor-in-chief is Domingos de Andrade.

The newspaper is owned by Global Notícias Media Group (formerly Controlinveste), which also owns Diário de Notícias and the private radio station TSF.

== Circulation ==
The circulation of JN was 108,000 copies in the period between January and September 2000. Between January and March 2003 the paper had a circulation of 109,000 copies. The circulation of the paper was 102,000 copies in 2003, making it the second best selling newspaper in the country.

Its circulation was 100,188 copies in 2005. It was the second best-selling newspaper in Portugal with a circulation of 92,000 copies in 2007. Between September and October 2013 the paper sold 65,403 copies.

== Sections and supplements ==
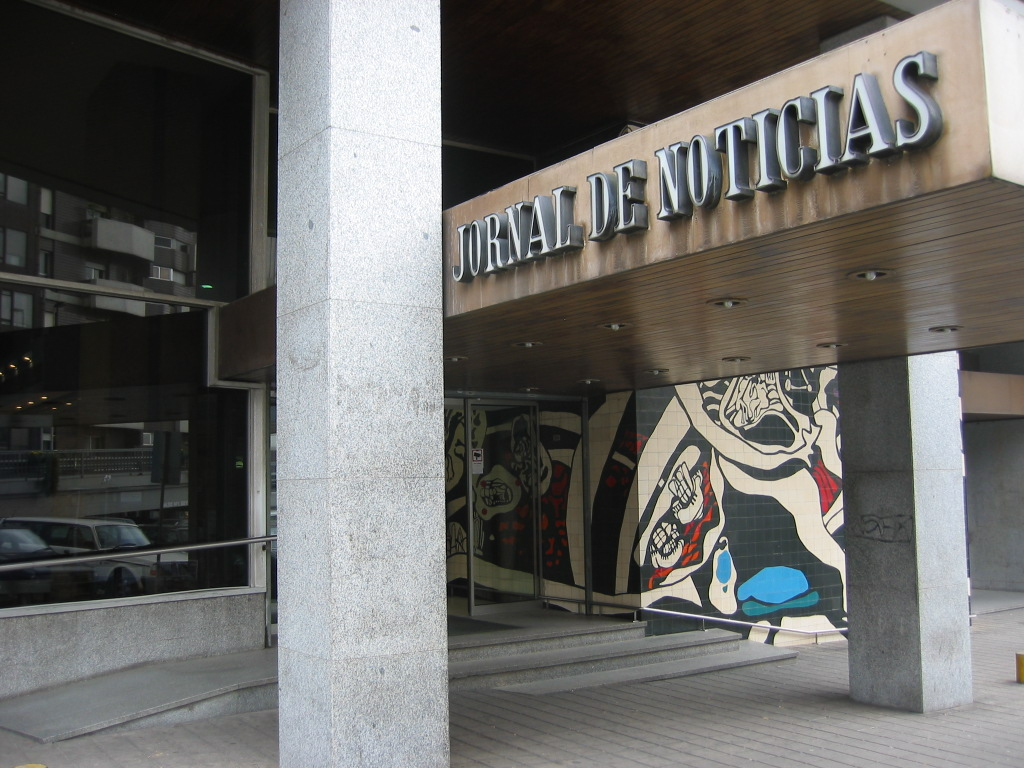
Entrance to JN building in Porto

- News Magazine Supplement or NM (weekly, on Sunday)
- News Saturday Supplement or NS (weekly, on Saturdays)
- TV or NTV News Supplement (weekly, on Fridays)
- JN classifieds Supplement (daily)
- JN Business Supplement (weekly, on Fridays)
- Sports Supplement (daily)

== See also ==
- List of newspapers in Portugal
