= CLP TV =

Defunct French television channel serving the Portuguese diaspora

CLP TV (Canal da Língua Portuguesa) was a French television channel for the Portuguese diaspora in the country and in Europe. Broadcasting from Paris, it operated for two years before shutting down and filing for bankruptcy in December 2008.

== History ==
In March 2006, a survey targeting half a thousand Portuguese speakers in Brazil was made, aiming to create a channel in the Portuguese language with the motivations being "connections to their birth culture" and the possibility of including programming from all Portuguese-speaking countries. According to António Cardoso, RTP Internacional, SIC Internacional, TV Globo Internacional and Record Europa didn't match the needs of the people who lived outside of the eight CPLP states. In June it was announced that CLP TV would tentatively start in September. The channel had provisional facilities at the Ledru Rollin street, at Ivry-sur-Seine, in Paris, with a staff of 25, eyeing to increase to 70 in two years. The French regulator CSA was studying the feasibility of the project, as well as having at least 40% of its content spoken in the French language, with Portuguese subtitles.

Experimental broadcasts started on 25 November 2006, which would last until early February. The channel hadn't announced its directors of news and general programming, but was already eyeing technical partnerships with staff from TV Globo. Nothing concrete had emerged from Portugal; it was proposing partnerships with the three networks (RTP, SIC and TVI) but not in a unified basis. Regarding its news operation, the network wanted to be "impartial" without being critical. Its initial test program consisted of a one-hour launch program that looped; followed by a four-hour schedule in December. For Christmas, the channel would broadcast for eight hours until February, when the 24-hour service would start.

The launch of the regular service was delayed to July 2007, due to the reformulation of the project, which as of June had "three or four" staff from the initial phase. The new staff was recruited in Portugal and France; as of the time of launching, there were plans to increase to 30. The primary targets were France and Luxembourg, where the channel was set to be distributed on cable and IPTV providers, as well as by satellite throughout Europe, broadcasting a 20-hour schedule. The network also gained the rights to air two matches of the Portuguese football league per matchweek, involving at least one of the Big 3, and from September, educational programming teaching the Portuguese language and Portuguese history. Plans to include African news provided by RTP África were also on the pipeline.

On 2 July 2007, CLP TV started its regular broadcasts. At launch, it was seen by an estimated one million viewers, with viewers reporting from the two target countries as well as Spain by satellite.

On 24 June 2008, it was announced that ZON was obliged to include it and three channels from NEXTV, as part of ZON's acquisition of TVTEL, given that the channels were available on the Porto cable company.

=== Bankruptcy and shutdown ===
On 7 October 2008, CLP TV suspended its transmissions, citing "technical and administrative reasons", then on 28 October 2008, it announced the cessation of the activity of its staff of 27. The staff was largely inexperienced, and didn't create a proper advertising unit to sell advertising slots. There was the hypothesis of resuming its activities, but there were two factors to decide: the bankruptcy of the company or keeping the company operational, without staff members. Ultimately the company ceased all its activities on 1 December 2008, with its director-general António Cardoso accusing its closure on its poor management. Negotiations with Brazilian and Cape Verdean companies were fruitless, and the channel's technical problems in its final weeks on air came with the ejection of the channel from Globecast's uplink premises.
