= TSF (radio station) =

Portuguese radio station

TSF Rádio Notícias
- Lisbon; Portugal
- Frequency: 89.5 MHz – 107.6 MHz

Programming
- Language: Portuguese
- Format: News, Talk, Contemporary Music

Ownership
- Owner: Global Media Group

History
- First air date: 29 February 1988

Links
- Website: www.tsf.pt

TSF is a Portuguese radio station, founded in 1989 and broadcasting from Lisbon.

TSF is one of the three main Portuguese radio news stations, alongside Antena 1 and Rádio Renascença. Its programs are focused on news. It was legally founded, though its first broadcast on 29 February 1988 was not legal, because at that time private radios were forbidden in Portugal. TSF is part of the Portuguese Global Media Group.

== History ==
The station made its first broadcast as a pirate radio station on June 17, 1984 with a four-hour broadcast featuring testimonies from politicians regarding the legalization of independent radio stations.

In February 2020, it had an audience share of 3.7% or 317,000 listeners

== Programs ==
The station's programs include political commentary, debate and sports. Programs are published on the station website and are also available on podcast platforms.
