= NOS Audiovisuais =

Portuguese cinema chain

Coordinates: 38°45′34″N 9°9′29″W

- Type: Subsidiary of NOS
- Founded: 1953; 73 years ago
- Headquarters: Lisbon, Portugal
- Products: Cinema and Home video
- Parent: NOS
- Website: cinemas.nos.pt

NOS Audiovisuais (formerly ZON Lusomundo) is a Portuguese integrated media corporation founded in 1953, which has major interests in movie distribution, cinema theaters and media assets.

It was founded with the purpose of movie distribution, and had a very close relation with the biggest studios (it is currently the Portuguese licensee of United International Pictures, Walt Disney Studios Home Entertainment, Warner Home Video, Miramax Films, DreamWorks SKG, Multicom Entertainment Group, Vantage Media International and Shoreline Entertainment). In the 1980s Lusomundo started acquiring newspapers, including Comércio do Porto, Diário de Notícias and Jornal de Notícias. In the early 1990s, it acquired TSF Rádio Notícias and minority stakes of TVI.

== History ==
The company was founded by João Ildefonso Bordalo in 1953, based on an existing family group. In 1973, it acquired the Tivoli Theater in Lisbon, using it as the distributor's flagship. That decade saw colonel Luís Silva becoming its president.

By 1999, Lusomundo had become the largest multimedia group in Portugal. In addition to its core cinema business, it also owned newspapers, the distribution rights to Sony's PlayStation and a 50% share in the Portuguese theatrical circuit and film distribution. It already had a strategic partnership with Warner Bros. to distribute its titles and with Sonae Sierra, to install the Warner Lusomundo chain in its malls. An internationalization plan was already on the cards, with the acquisition of several movie theaters in Spain and a plan to open eleven screens in São Paulo by 2001. It already owned three screens and a multiplex in Maputo.

In 2000, PT Multimédia made a successful takeover of Lusomundo. Since then, Lusomundo was split into two companies with different owners:

- Lusomundo Audiovisuais, which controls the cinema and movie distribution assets
- Lusomundo Media (now owned by Global Media Group), which controls other media assets

The Lusomundo brand was used on two (later four) premium subscription television movie channels from 1 June 2003, after SIC and Globo opted to leave the premium movie channel business, making Lusomundo its sole owner. Since 1 November 2007, these channels are named TVCine.

In 2007, PT Multimedia separated from PT Comunicações and became ZON Multimédia and this corporation was renamed ZON Lusomundo, in May 2014 it was renamed NOS, officially retiring the 61-year-old Lusomundo name.
