= Diário de Notícias =

Portuguese weekly newspaper

- The 26 December 2007 front page
- Type: Weekly newspaper
- Format: Tabloid
- Owner: Global Media Group
- Editor: Leonídio Paulo Ferreira
- Founded: 29 December 1864; 161 years ago
- Language: Portuguese
- Headquarters: Rua Tomás da Fonseca, Torre E, 3º Piso, 1600-209, Lisbon
- ISSN: 0870-1954
- Website: www.dn.pt

Diário de Notícias (Portuguese pronunciation: [ˈdjaɾju ðɨ nuˈtisjɐʃ]), abbreviated as DN, is a Portuguese weekly newspaper published in Lisbon, Portugal. Established in 1864, the paper is considered a newspaper of record for Portugal.

== History and profile ==
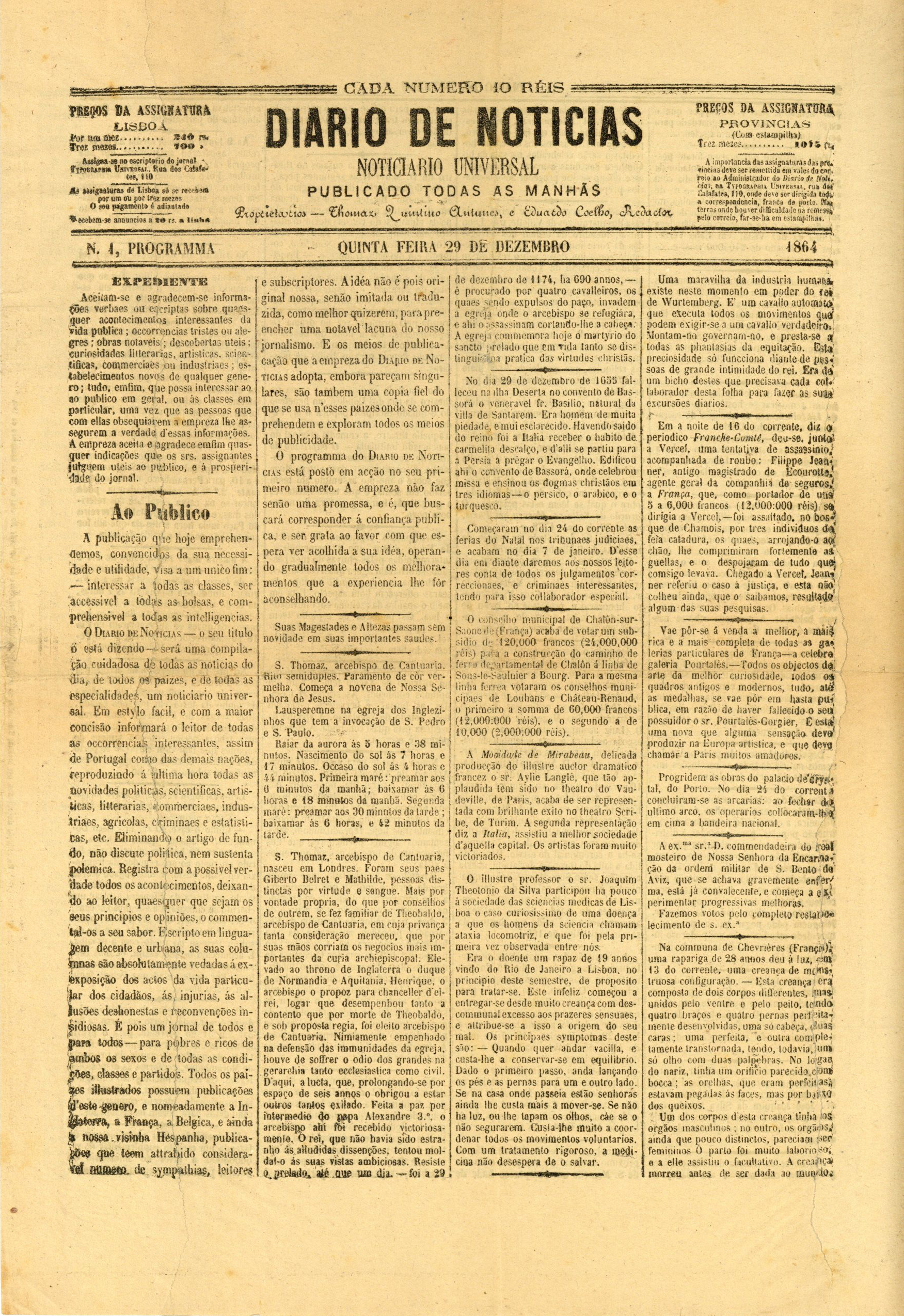
First issue of the Diário de Notícias (29 December 1864)

Diário de Notícias was first published in Lisbon on 29 December 1864 by Tomás Quintino Antunes and Eduardo Coelho. At its early phase the paper had no explicit political stance and financially relied on the advertisements. Its headquarters is in Lisbon. During the 1880s the novelist Eça de Queiroz, then stationed in Newcastle-upon-Tyne, England, in the Portuguese diplomatic service, contributed occasional "London letters" to the newspaper. Some of these were afterwards published in a book entitled Cartas de Inglaterra.

Before the Carnation Revolution Diário de Notícias belonged to the Empresa Nacional de Publicidade, a propaganda arm of the dictatorship. Following the Carnation Revolution, the paper remained nationalized until the early 1990s. Then the paper and Jornal de Notícias were sold to the Lusomundo group. In 2005 the Controlinveste group bought the papers. Both papers are now owned by Angolan media conglomerate Global Media Group (formerly Controlinveste Media).

Diário de Notícias is published in tabloid format. Music critic Joaquim de Seabra Pessoa, father of poet Fernando Pessoa, worked for the paper. In 2018 Diário de Notícias became a weekly newspaper published on Saturdays.

The paper is considered a newspaper of record for Portugal.

=== Grupo BEL ===
In September 2020, the Global Media Group reached an agreement with Grupo BEL, owned by businessman Marco Galinha, for the latter to become a shareholder in the company. Grupo BEL was founded in 2001 by Marco Galinha and is active in various sectors, including the vending machine and aeronautics industries. The group entered the media sector in 2018 through Jornal Económico. Marco Galinha, originally from Rio Maior, is the CEO and chairman of Grupo BEL, which he founded in 2001. In February 2021, Marco Galinha was elected chairman of Global Media Group.

At the end of 2023, Grupo BEL sold the majority of its shares in the subsidiary Páginas Civilizadas, Lda., which held a majority stake in Global Notícias – Media Group, S.A. With this transaction, the management of Global Media Group (GMG) was taken over by a new executive administration, and Marco Galinha, the founder and CEO of Grupo BEL, stepped down from his role as Chairman of the Executive Committee of GMG.

== Circulation ==
In the period of 1995–1996 Diário de Notícias had a circulation of 63,000 copies slightly down on its 1880s circulation and below its peak as a propaganda newspaper for the Estado Novo in the 1930s (circulation of 120,000 in mainland Portugal and an additional 70,000 in its colonies), making it the seventh best-selling newspaper and third best selling daily newspaper in the country. The circulation of the paper was 44,055 copies in 2002. It was 54,000 copies in 2003 and 45,015 copies in 2004. The circulation of the paper was 37,992 copies in 2005, 37,904 copies in 2006 and 37,759 copies in 2007. Its 2008 circulation was 33,626 copies in 2008.

Diário de Notícias sold 34,119 copies in 2011 and 29,054 copies in 2012.

By 2017 the circulation was down to less than 19,000 copies and the newspaper had undergone a change to a tabloid journalism relying on its online advertising and the Angolan media group that owns it to stay open.

== Supplements ==
  - Classificados DN
  - Dinheiro Vivo
  - 1864
- Non-existent supplements (nowadays):
  - DNA
  - DN Negócios (changed its name to DN Bolsa then to DN Economia and in 2015 to Dinheiro Vivo which became a separate newspaper in 2016 and news site in 2017)

Note: It is understood by «Non-periodical fixed supplements» that those are proper supplements of the newspaper (and not edited by external people to the newspaper for the newspaper to publish it) though not published periodically.

== See also ==
- List of newspapers in Portugal
