= TVTEL =

- Company type: Private
- Industry: Telecommunication
- Founded: Porto, Portugal 17 December 1999
- Defunct: 2009
- Fate: Merged with ZON Multimédia
- Products: Direct broadcast satellite, cable television
- Website: tvtel.pt at the Wayback Machine (archived 2008-02-15)

TVTEL Comunicações, S.A. was a Portuguese cable pay television and digital satellite service provider. The cable service started in 2001 in the Porto area, acting as its regional operator. In 2007 the provider increased its reach, starting its fiber network in parts of the Lisbon metropolitan area and nationwide by satellite. The satellite service started on 26 June 2007 and it was on the Eurobird 9 satellite, broadcasting FTA and Conax-encrypted channels for the whole of Europe. It was bought by ZON in early 2009 and subsequently closed by it by merging its operations with ZON Multimédia in late 2009.

== History ==
Ahead of the start of TVTEL, on 17 December 1996 APOCABO - Associação Portuguesa de Operadores Privados de Comunicações por Cabo was formed, as a group of independent cable television companies: its members being Bragatel, Pluricanal and Intercabo. TVTEL later joined upon its founding in 1999.

As TVTEL was already starting its services, it announced on 27 August 2000 that the service was due to begin in October, providing 45 channels, 10% being exclusive to the provider, as a competitor to TV Cabo. Paulo Pereira considered that the technical quality presented by the new network will be "superior" to that of TV Cabo, due to the advanced equipment the provider had, in contrast to the competitor's equipment from years earlier. One of the "strategic decisions" taken by TVTEL was "to provide the network with more optical fiber than would have been normal two or three years earlier, allowing for "better signal quality", noting that the equipment became "more affordable in monetary terms". For the time being, TVTEL was set to cover around 250,000 homes and businesses, offering television, internet and multimedia services. For the long-term future, contacts were already being made in order to offer fixed telephone and data services for companies, in association with one of the new national telecommunications operators. There were also pilot tests for an interactive TV service, aimed to start in September.

There was the possibility to open a regional information channel, but the administrator was hesitant about "the feasibility and the existence of space for such a project", adding that, in any case, TVTEL's experience was to involve "making networks" instead of creating television channels. Even so, the company planned to convert its web portal (www.olaporto.com) into a local information channel that would also be seen in the provider.

When it started regular services in October 2000, TVTEL had plans to expand its service to Lisbon. When the decision was mooted, Paulo Pereira stipulated that "no concrete step has yet been taken in this direction, but this is something that has always been on the table". The priority taken at the time was to install the cable network in Porto and, thanks to their experience, gain more subscribers. The goal was to reach 5,000 subscribers in the first year, raising to 20,000 in the second and 40,000 in the third. TVTEL also owned three websites, the local OlaPorto.com, tech website TecMania.com and lifestyle website CasaPronta.com, as well as buying Expernet aiming to provide services for companies.

In November 2000, a banking syndicate led by Banco BPI and comprising Caixa Geral de Depósitos and Banco Comercial Português signed a medium and long-term financing agreement with TVTEL, amounting to €15 million, enabling the completion of the financial coverage of the infrastructure. In the same month TVTEL began the installation of its hybrid fiber optic/coaxial network in the Ramalde area, in the municipality of Porto, providing cable television services (46 channels) and cable internet access, with long-term prospects for the offer of interactive digital TV and fixed telecommunications services.

The existing web portal OlaPorto.com was set to have a version for interactive digital TV and broadband content to be developed during 2001. A contract was signed with the city council on 21 June 2001 to offer free internet access to primary schools. The network rolled out in Vila Nova de Gaia in July 2001.

NTV, at the time a private cable channel, bought by RTP the following year, and produced from Porto, was added to TVTEL's lineup at the time of launch in October 2001. On 5 December the premium channel offer was increased to include the two Telecine channels and the newly launched Disney Channel. The company started delivering the channels' monthly schedule magazine in January 2003.

In April 2003, TVTEL bought 100% of Pluricanal Gondomar's stocks, enabling the former to expand its coverage area. Pluricanal had been operating since July 1999 in the region. In June, the network was set to reach the Maia area. The launch in Maia was subsequently delayed to March 2004.

AXN was added in March 2004. MGM was added in June. RTP Memória followed in October, in line with a contract signed between the two companies valid for two years.

At the end of 2005, the operator was negotiating the inclusion of Reality TV (later renamed Zone Reality), while still negotiating with PT to obtain the rights to SIC Mulher, under the grounds that TV Cabo still had exclusive rights to the channel.

Following a rejection from PTConteúdos to broadcast Lusomundo Happy, TVTEL refused to continue carrying the Lusomundo channels by blocking the contract with them on 9 February 2006.

During 2006, TVTEL was enlarging its network in the municipalities of Gaia, Gondomar and Matosinhos, aiming a potential number of 40,000 households and with a budget of €3 million. On 3 April 2006 TVTEL started broadcasting Invicta TV exclusively over its network.

From early July 2006, TVTEL started conducting tests of its 100% fiber-optic network. aiming to finish its rollout by the end of the year. On 17 July the company started announcing the rollout of the network in Lisbon, allowing the company to expand outside of the Porto area, providing pre-registration and, by the end of the year, delimitation of the prioritary areas to develop the network. In talks with the managers of Disney Channel in Portugal and Spain, TVTEL demanded that the channel would move to the basic package, under the premise that PT Conteúdos only allowed the channel to be premium for reasons "only it understands".

TVTEL initiated an advertising campaign on 1 November 2006, with actress Soraia Chaves and the slogan "Crime é não ter TVTEL" (Not having TVTEL is a crime).

In November 2006, it was announced that the fiber network was officially going to be installed in Lisbon in January, covering Oeiras, starting with Carnaxide and later extending to Queijas, Algés and Linda-a-Velha. Both the internet and cable services already available in Porto were included. At the end of the month, the company announced that it was going to start a satellite television service during 2007. TVTEL acquired the contents and actual channel of Invicta TV, up until then owned by Finanzza Investments, on 1 January 2007.

In early February 2007, TVTEL started installing its digital cable service, by moving the scrambled channels (Sport TV, Disney Channel and Hustler TV) to set-top-boxes, similar to what happened with other Portuguese cable operators, by removing the premium networks from analog. Tests were carried out in January, followed in February by the rollout of STBs to replace the old analog decoders throughout the year. The provider expected to start rolling out interactive services in September, using the chosen technology.

=== Sale, merger and aftermath ===
Following the removal of the Sport TV channels from the platform, rumors emerged of a possible sale. TVTEL reiterated in April of that year that it "was not for sale", reportedly denying the possibility of Sonaecom buying the provider and that the installation of its fiber network was the company's priority.

On November 24, 2008, the sale of TVTel to ZON Multimédia was approved.

== Services ==
=== Television ===
Since its launch, TVTEL had a two-tiered basic cable package: Selecção with 23 channels and Clássico with 45 channels (coincidentally these were the names of the equally two-tiered TV Cabo packages). TVTEL's premium services at launch were Sport TV and Private Gold. The Telecine (Lusomundo from 2003) channels were later added per an agreement, and remained until the 2006 cessation of the renewal of the contract with PT Conteúdos.

TVTEL also had an information channel that was initially a mosaic.

The satellite service launched on 1 June 2007 with a package of sixteen channels.

== Controversies ==
=== 2002 accusations of unethical behaviour from TV Cabo ===
TVTEL issued a press release on 7 January 2002 citing "inappropriate and unethical behaviour" that its competitor TV Cabo Porto, S.A., has been taking towards customers who gave up the services of that company by connecting to TVTEL. TVTEL condemned the behaviour as a "culmination of a set of other actions tending to harm TVTEL's legitimate activity, its image and good name". TVTEL subsequently filed a complaint to ICP regarding the situation. In December, TVTEL requested the Competition Authority not to authorise the purchase of 33.3% of Sport TV's shares, the same percentage was held at the time by RTP. Aside from the advertising affair from April, TVTEL also condemned the "lack of timely information about programming and non-availability of new services, such as the simultaneous transmission of 4 Champions League football matches", which TVTEL was considering to block. In addition, Sport TV's advertising only mentioned TV Cabo as its only option to subscribe.

If the purchase was to be approved, Portugal Telecom was going to "substantially reinforce" its almost total hegemony in the pay-TV business in Portugal".

=== Complaint against Sport TV and TV Cabo (2003-2004) ===
In April 2003, TVTEL filed a complaint against both TV Cabo and Sport TV over the fact that "TV Cabo has continued to refuse to sell it advertising space, in its capacity as commercial representative of that channel." The provider considered the situation as a show of "arrogance and disrespect for competition rules", making it impossible for TVTEL to advertise its products on Sport TV. On 28 January 2004 TVTEL demanded the AACS (current ERC) to suspend Sport TV's frequent pop-up interactive services that were available on TV Cabo (Multijogos and Multicâmaras) under the grounds that Sport TV were not authorised to broadcast these services to other providers. TVTEL was surprised over the decision taken by the Competition Authority in April, claiming that the decision had "no practical effects".

=== Second complaint against TV Cabo over the broadcast of scrambled channels ===
In October, TVTEL formalised a complaint against TV Cabo at both the Portuguese Competition Authority and the Civil Court of Porto, over continued dumping practices, seeking compensation worth hundreds of euros, in which TV Cabo "came" to offer channels at a lower cost, including scrambled channels such as the Lusomundo (known as Telecine until July) channels and Disney Channel. TV Cabo on its hand claimed to offer scrambled channels "for free or at a lower price" than on TVTEL, and that, under such practices, the channels would be distributed exclusively over the TV Cabo networks.

=== Blocking of Lusomundo Action (April 2004) ===
Upon the launch of the third Lusomundo channel, Lusomundo Action, in April 2004, PTConteúdos blocked TVTEL from offering the channel shortly after it started broadcasting. TVTEL had only learned that the channel started broadcasting from the press, implying "serious effects on the conditions of competition in the national pay-TV market". PTConteúdos claimed to be the only company able to buy movies for the Lusomundo channels and subsequently relaying these channels under conditional access.

Subsequently, TVTEL was blocked from carrying Lusomundo Action as from 1 September 2004.

After a final intervention from the Competition Authority, TVTEL was finally allowed to include the channel in December.

=== Removal of Sport TV ===
On 1 March 2007 Sport TV stopped broadcasting to TVTEL subscribers, causing a major outcry. SportTV justified the move by stating that TVTEL had not already start broadcasting exclusively with digital encryption. TVTEL continued accusing TV Cabo of creating a "near-monopoly", whereas the provider considered the cut to be "illicit". TVTEL later placed a scrolling message on the channel saying "A Sport TV não deixa que a TVTEL cresça. Porque será?" (SportTV doesn't allow TVTEL to grow, how come?). At the time, SportTV was 50% owned by then-competitor (later its new owner) ZON TVCabo. TVTEL accused Sport TV of "damaging its image" and claimed a compensation of €4 million.

Within a few days, TVTEL said that it failed to negotiate with Sport TV and was appealing to the courts about the decision; in order to minimise the damage caused, Sport TV 2 was replaced by NASN.

This controversy was somewhat similar to that of Virgin Media vs BSkyB.
