= Idolos season 7 =

Idolos
- Season 7
- Hosted by: Sara Matos
- Judges: Martim Sousa Tavares; Joana Marques; Ana Bacalhau; Tatanka
- Winner: Eduardo Gonçalves
- Runner-up: Eva Stuart

Release
- Original network: SIC
- Original release: April 9 – July 3, 2022

Season chronology
- ← Previous; Season 6

The seventh season of Ídolos aired in 2022. Sara Matos was the presenter. This season, the judges were Martim Sousa Tavares, Joana Marques, Ana Bacalhau and Tatanka.

== Live shows ==
=== Top 15 - This is Me ===
The six finalists with the highest number of votes (by the viewers) were automatically in the Top 10. Among the remaining 9, the judges chose 4 contestants to keep.

Order	Contestant	Song	Result
1	Eva Stuart	"Black or White"	Saved by Tatanka
2	Beatriz Almeida	"Eu Sei Que Vou Te Amar"	Saved by Ana
3	Eduardo Gonçalves	"The House of the Rising Sun"	Safe
4	Miguel Pavia	"O Tempo Vai Esperar"	Safe
5	Diana Silva	"A Million Dreams"	Eliminated
6	Juliana Anjo	"Canção de Embalar"	Safe
7	Mário Pedrosa	"Take Me to Church"	Saved by Joana
8	Carolina Cardoso	"Bohemian Rhapsody"	Safe
9	Caco	"Sorte Grande"	Eliminated
10	Fábio Augusto	"Waiting on the World to Change"	Safe
11	Ana Rangel	"Easy on Me"	Eliminated
12	João Gonçalves	"És do Mundo"	Eliminated
13	Diana Mendes	"Words as Weapons"	Saved by Martim
14	Gabriela Lemos	"Good 4 U"	Safe
15	Nuno Oliveira	"Heaven"	Eliminated

=== Top 10 - Love Songs ===
The two contestants with the fewest votes were eliminated. Even though the results were revealed arbitrarily, Beatriz Almeida was the last person to be called safe.

Order	Contestant	Song	Result
1	Gabriela Lemos	"Onde Vais"	Safe
2	Fábio Augusto	"Your Song"	Safe
3	Beatriz Almeida	"A Pele Que Há Em Mim"	Safe
4	Eduardo Gonçalves	"Wicked Game"	Safe
5	Juliana Anjo	"O Mundo é um Moinho"	Safe
6	Carolina Cardoso	"I'll Never Love Again"	Safe
7	Diana Mendes	"Crazy"	Eliminated
8	Mário Pedrosa	"Ouvi Dizer"	Eliminated
9	Eva Stuart	"My Heart Will Go On"	Safe
10	Miguel Pavia	"Mais Ninguém"	Safe

=== Top 8 - Dance Hits ===
The contestant with the fewest votes was eliminated. Even though the results were revealed arbitrarily, Juliana Anjo was the last person to be called safe.

Order	Contestant	Song	Result
1	Juliana Anjo	"Só Me Apetece Dançar"	Safe
2	Eduardo Gonçalves	"Roadhouse Blues"	Safe
3	Miguel Pavia	"Linhas Cruzadas"	Safe
4	Eva Stuart	"I Wanna Dance With Somebody"	Safe
5	Carolina Cardoso	"Não Me Importo"	Eliminated
6	Beatriz Almeida	"Multimilionário"	Safe
7	Gabriela Lemos	"Can't Take My Eyes Off You"	Safe
8	Fábio Augusto	"Naptel Xupalima"	Safe

=== Top 7 - Portuguese Music ===
The contestant with the fewest votes was eliminated.

Order	Contestant	Song	Result
1	Beatriz Almeida	"Flor Sem Tempo"	Safe
2	Juliana Anjo	"Sopro do Coração"	Safe
3	Eva Stuart	"Sol de Inverno"	Safe
4	Miguel Pavia	"Tudo o Que Eu Te Dou"	Eliminated
5	Fábio Augusto	"O Pastor"	Safe
6	Gabriela Lemos	"Gaivota"	Safe
7	Eduardo Gonçalves	"Canção de Engate"	Safe

=== Top 6 - Rock In Rio / Judges' Choice ===
The contestant with the fewest votes was eliminated.

Order	Contestant	Song	Choice	Result
1	Eva Stuart	"My Immortal"	Self choice	Safe
2	Beatriz Almeida	"Eu Sei"	Self choice	Safe
3	Fábio Augusto	"Sunday Morning"	Self choice	Eliminated
4	Eduardo Gonçalves	"Feeling Good"	Self choice	Safe
5	Juliana Anjo	"Encontros e Despedidas"	Self choice	Safe
6	Gabriela Lemos	"Anyone"	Self choice	Safe
7	Eduardo Gonçalves	"Times Like These"	Chosen by Tatanka	Safe
8	Gabriela Lemos	"Toxic"	Chosen by Ana Bacalhau	Safe
9	Beatriz Almeida	"You Know I'm No Good"	Chosen by Joana Marques	Safe
10	Juliana Anjo	"Roxanne"	Chosen by Tatanka	Safe
11	Fábio Augusto	"Isn't She Lovely"	Chosen by Ana Bacalhau	Eliminated
12	Eva Stuart	"I'm Outta Love"	Chosen by Martim Tavares	Safe

=== Top 5 - Year 1992 / 21st Century (Semifinals) ===
Order	Contestant	Song	Theme	Result
1	Gabriela Lemos	"Chuva Dissolvente" (with Filipe Pinto)	Year 1992	Eliminated
2	Eva Stuart	"Lusitana Paixão" (with Carolina Torres)	Year 1992	Safe
3	Juliana Anjo	"A Gente Vai Continuar" (with Nuno Norte)	Year 1992	Safe
4	Beatriz Almeida	"Ana Lee" (with Diana Piedade)	Year 1992	Safe
5	Eduardo Gonçalves	"Jardins Proibidos" (with Sandra Pereira)	Year 1992	Safe
6	Juliana Anjo	"People Help the People"	21st Century	Safe
7	Beatriz Almeida	"Do I Wanna Know?"	21st Century	Safe
8	Eva Stuart	"Set Fire to the Rain"	21st Century	Safe
9	Eduardo Gonçalves	"Enemy"	21st Century	Safe
10	Gabriela Lemos	"Idontwannabeyouanymore"	21st Century	Eliminated

=== Top 4 - Finale ===
Order	Contestant	Song	Result
1	Beatriz Almeida	"No Teu Poema"	Eliminated
2	Eva Stuart	"Drivers License"	Safe
3	Eduardo Gonçalves	"Norwegian Wood"	Safe
4	Juliana Anjo	"At Last"	Safe
5	Eduardo Gonçalves	"Shine On You Crazy Diamond"	Safe
6	Eva Stuart	"Flashlight"	Safe
7	Juliana Anjo	"Adeus Tristeza"	Eliminated
8	Eva Stuart	"Never Enough"	Runner-Up
9	Eduardo Gonçalves	"Black"	Winner

== Elimination chart ==
Female	Male

Safe	Bottom	Last safe^{1}	Eliminated

Week:		21/05^{2}	28/05	04/06	11/06	18/06	25/06	03/07		
Place	Contestant	Results								
1	Eduardo Gonçalves									Winner
2	Eva Stuart	Saved								Runner-up
3	Juliana Anjo			Last 2		Last 2			Elim	
4	Beatriz Almeida	Saved	Last 3				Last 2	Elim		
5	Gabriela Lemos						Elim			
6	Fábio Augusto				Last 2	Elim				
7	Miguel Pavia				Elim					
8	Carolina Cardoso			Elim						
9-10	Mário Pedrosa	Saved	Elim							
9-10	Diana Mendes	Saved	Elim							
11-15	Nuno Oliveira	Elim								
11-15	João Gonçalves	Elim								
11-15	Ana Rangel	Elim								
11-15	Diana Silva	Elim								
11-15	Caco	Elim								

- ^Note 1 Being safe last does not necessarily mean that the person was among the bottom contestants.
- ^Note 2 The top 6 contestants were revealed with no particular order.

Preceded by Season 6	Ídolos	Succeeded by -
