= Idolos season 5 =

Idolos
- Season 5
- Hosted by: João Manzarra; Cláudia Vieira
- Judges: Manuel Moura dos Santos; Bárbara Guimarães; Tony Carreira; Pedro Abrunhosa
- Winner: Diogo Piçarra
- Runner-up: Mariana Domingues

Release
- Original network: SIC
- Original release: 25 March – 29 July 2012

Season chronology
- ← Previous; Season 4 Next → Season 6

The fifth season of Ídolos aired in 2012. João Manzarra and Cláudia Vieira were the presenters.

== Live shows ==
=== Top 14 – Their Personal Idols ===
Débora Teixeira, Paulo Marques, Pablo Oliveira and Solange Muxanga left the competition in this semi-finals round. Now, the Top 10 is found.

Order	Contestant	Song	Result
1	Débora Teixeira	"Proud Mary"	Wild Card
2	André Abrantes	"Haven't Met You Yet"	Safe
3	Mariana Domingues	"Turning Tables"	Top 5
4	João Santos	"Frágil"	Top 5
5	Catarina Almada	"Freedom! '90"	Wild Card
6	Diogo Piçarra	"Fix You"	Top 5
7	Teresa Queirós	"Valerie"	Safe
8	Solange Muxanga	"Feeling Good"	Eliminated
9	Margarida Carriço	"Just Like Heaven"	Top 5
10	Paulo Marques	"I Believe I Can Fly"	Eliminated
11	Pablo Oliveira	"Easy"	Eliminated
12	Mónica Mendes	"If I Ain't Got You"	Safe
13	André Cruz	"Don't Look Back In Anger"	Top 5
14	Inês Herédia	"Shake It Out"	Safe

==== Wild Card ====
Order	Contestant	Song	Result
1	Débora Teixeira	"Sopro do Coração"	Eliminated
2	Catarina Almada	"Chuva"	Safe

- Group performance: "Mambo No. 5"

=== Top 10 – 21st century ===
André Abrantes is the first finalist leaving the competition and André Cruz was in the bottom 2 with him.

Order	Contestant	Song	Result
1	Inês Herédia	"Domino"	Safe
2	João Santos	"Seven Nation Army"	Safe
3	Catarina Almada	"O Amor é Mágico"	Safe
4	Margarida Carriço	"Last Nite"	Safe
5	Mariana Domingues	"Mama Do (Uh Oh, Uh Oh)"	Safe
6	Diogo Piçarra	"Sex on Fire"	Safe
7	André Cruz	"Forget You!"	Bottom 2
8	Teresa Queirós	"You Give Me Something"	Safe
9	André Abrantes	"Drops of Jupiter (Tell Me)"	Eliminated
10	Mónica Mendes	"Put Your Records On"	Safe

=== Top 9 – 80's Portuguese Music ===
Mónica Mendes leaves the show, in a sad elimination. Alongside her, João Santos and Teresa Queirós were in the bottom 3.

Order	Contestant	Song	Result
1	João Santos	"Amanhã de Manhã"	Bottom 3
2	Mariana Domingues	"Por Quem Não Esqueci"	Safe
3	Diogo Piçarra	"Estou Além"	Safe
4	Teresa Queirós	"Telepatia"	Bottom 3
5	Mónica Mendes	"O Anzol"	Eliminated
6	Margarida Carriço	"Com um Brilhozinho nos Olhos"	Safe
7	Inês Herédia	"O Homem do Leme"	Safe
8	Catarina Almada	"Dessas Juras Que Se Fazem"	Safe
9	André Cruz	"Pó de Arroz"	Safe

=== Top 8 – The Beatles ===
Catarina Almada is eliminated. For the second week in a row, Teresa Queirós is in the bottom 2.

Order	Contestant	Song	Result
1	Teresa Queirós	"Come Together"	Bottom 2
2	Catarina Almada	"Let It Be"	Eliminated
3	André Cruz	"Don't Let Me Down"	Safe
4	Margarida Carriço	"Hey Jude"	Safe
5	Mariana Domingues	"While My Guitar Gently Weeps"	Safe
6	Diogo Piçarra	"Yesterday"	Safe
7	Inês Herédia	"Twist and Shout"	Safe
8	João Santos	"Help!"	Safe

=== Top 7 (first week) – Songs from the Movies ===
João Santos was the contestant with the fewest votes, but the judges decided to save him and with that, the following week two people will go home. Inês Herédia and Mariana Domingues were shockingly in the bottom 3, both for the first time.

Order	Contestant	Song	Featured Film	Result
1	João Santos	"Hero"	Spider-Man	Saved
2	Mariana Domingues	"Roxanne"	Moulin Rouge!	Bottom 3
3	André Cruz	"(Everything I Do) I Do It For You"	Robin Hood: Prince of Thieves	Safe
4	Margarida Carriço	"I Don't Want to Miss a Thing"	Armageddon	Safe
5	Inês Herédia	"Can You Feel The Love Tonight"	The Lion King	Bottom 3
6	Diogo Piçarra	"Creep"	The Social Network	Safe
7	Teresa Queirós	"Walking on Sunshine"	Look Who's Talking	Safe

=== Top 7 (second week) – Great Portuguese Hits ===
Inês Herédia and Margarida Carriço were eliminated. André Cruz was once again in the bottom 3. The first name revealed was Margarida Carriço's, but was never told that she had been the person with the fewest votes. Margarida Carriço was probably the most shocking elimination, because she was in the Top 5, in the first live show, and she had never been in the bottom 2 or 3 until her elimination.

Order	Contestant	Song	Result
1	Inês Herédia	"Perdidamente"	Eliminated
2	João Santos	"Lado Lunar"	Safe
3	Mariana Domingues	"Fácil de Entender"	Safe
4	Teresa Queirós	"Eu Sei"	Safe
5	André Cruz	"Carta"	Bottom 3
6	Diogo Piçarra	"Se Eu Fosse Um Dia o Teu Olhar"	Safe
7	Margarida Carriço	"Foram Cardos, Foram Prosas"	Eliminated

=== Top 5 – Viewers' Choice and Judges' Choice ===
From this point on, every contestant sings two songs. Teresa Queirós was eliminated, which is not a big shock, because she had been in the bottom twice before. André Cruz was in the bottom 2 in his third time.

Order	Contestant	Song	Chosen By	Result
1	Mariana Domingues	"Stronger (What Doesn't Kill You)"	Viewers	Safe
2	André Cruz	"Marry You"	Viewers	Bottom 2
3	Teresa Queirós	"The One That Got Away"	Viewers	Eliminated
4	Diogo Piçarra	"Somebody That I Used To Know"	Viewers	Safe
5	João Santos	"Where The Streets Have No Name"	Viewers	Safe
6	Teresa Queirós	"Índios da Meia Praia"	Judges	Eliminated
7	André Cruz	"Voar"	Judges	Bottom 2
8	Mariana Domingues	"Eu Sei Que Vou Te Amar"	Judges	Safe
9	João Santos	"Postal dos Correios"	Judges	Safe
10	Diogo Piçarra	"Ana Lee"	Judges	Safe

=== Top 4 – Great Successes ===
João Santos was eliminated, three weeks after the judges save. Shockingly, André Cruz was in the Top 2 with Mariana Domingues and for the first time ever Diogo Piçarra is in the bottom 2 with João.

Order	Contestant	Song	Result
1	André Cruz	"Eye of the Tiger"	Safe
2	João Santos	"Light My Fire"	Eliminated
3	Mariana Domingues	"I Will Survive"	Safe
4	Diogo Piçarra	"Hotel California"	Bottom 2
5	João Santos	"Hit the Road, Jack"	Eliminated
6	Diogo Piçarra	"The Whole of the Moon"	Bottom 2
7	André Cruz	"Tears in Heaven"	Safe
8	Mariana Domingues	"Sweet Dreams (Are Made of This)"	Safe

=== Top 3 – 3 Songs, 3 Languages ===
André Cruz is eliminated. The presenters revealed that Mariana was in the final, which meant that Diogo and André were the bottom 2.

Order	Contestant	Song	Result
1	Diogo Piçarra	"Perdóname"	Bottom 2
2	Mariana Domingues	"Je T'ai Menti"	Safe
3	André Cruz	"Corazón Espinado"	Eliminado
4	Mariana Domingues	"I'm Like a Bird"	Safe
5	André Cruz	"I Won't Give Up"	Eliminated
6	Diogo Piçarra	"Skinny Love"	Bottom 2
7	André Cruz	"Sol de Inverno"	Eliminated
8	Diogo Piçarra	"Chaga"	Bottom 2
9	Mariana Domingues	"Canção do Mar"	Safe

=== Top 2 – Finale ===
Diogo Piçarra wins the competition, after being in the bottom 2 in the last two weeks. Mariana Domingues takes the second place.

Order	Contestant	Song	Result
1	Mariana Domingues	"Thriller"	Runner-Up
2	Diogo Piçarra	"Nothing Else Matters"	Winner
3	Mariana Domingues & Vanessa da Mata	"Ai, Ai, Ai..."	N/A
4	Diogo Piçarra & Vanessa da Mata	"As Palavras"	N/A
5	Diogo Piçarra	"A Máquina (Accordou)"	Winner
6	Mariana Domingues	"Flutuo"	Runner-Up
7	Mariana Domingues & Diogo Piçarra	"Don't Let The Sun Go Down On Me"	N/A

== Elimination chart ==
Female	Male	Top 10 by the Viewers	Top 10 by the Judges	Safe on Wild Card stage

Safe	Safe First	Safe Last	Eliminated	Judges' Save

Stage:		Semifinal	Wild Card	Top 10								
Week:		27/05		03/06	10/06	17/06	24/06	01/07	08/07	15/07	22/07	29/07
Place	Contestant	Results										
1	Diogo Piçarra	Viewers								Bottom 2	Bottom 2	Winner
2	Mariana Domingues	Viewers					Bottom 3			Top 2		Runner-Up
3	André Cruz	Viewers		Bottom 2				Bottom 3	Bottom 2	Top 2	Elim	
4	João Santos	Viewers			Bottom 3		Saved			Elim		
5	Teresa Queirós	Judges			Bottom 3	Bottom 2			Elim			
6–7	Inês Herédia	Judges					Bottom 3	Elim				
6–7	Margarida Carriço	Viewers						Elim				
8	Catarina Almada	Wild Card	Judges			Elim						
9	Mónica Mendes	Judges			Elim							
10	André Abrantes	Judges		Elim								
11	Débora Teixeira	Wild Card	Elim									
12–14	Pablo Oliveira	Elim										
12–14	Paulo Marques	Elim										
12–14	Solange Muxanga	Elim										

Preceded by Season 4	Ídolos	Succeeded by Season 6
