= Achas que Sabes Dançar? =

- Presented by: Diana Chaves (season 2); João Manzarra (season 1)
- Judges: Marco Silva; Rita Blanco; Joaquín Cortés (season 2); Cesar Augusto Moniz; Marina Frangioia; Miguel Quintao
- Country of origin: Portugal
- No. of seasons: 2
- No. of episodes: 12

Production
- Running time: 2-3 hours

Original release
- Network: SIC
- Release: May 30 – July 25, 2010

Achas que Sabes Dançar is a televised dance competition that was aired on Portugal's SIC network in spring and summer of 2010. It has a format similar to that of other shows in the international So You Think You Can Dance television franchise, of which it is the Portuguese iteration. The first season premiered in May 2010 and concluded in July with dancer Marco Ferreira announced winner and awarded a cash prize, a scholarship to a dance school in New York and the title “Portugal's Favorite dancer.” The show was hosted by Portuguese television personality João Manzarra. The second season premiered in January 2015 and was hosted by the actress and TV presenter Diana Chaves.

== Winners ==
| Season | Name | Age | Hometown |
|---|---|---|---|
| 1 | Marco Ferreira | 23 | Santa Maria da Feira |
| 2 | Liliana Garcia | 25 | Porto |

== Season 1 ==
=== Judges and Presenter ===
| Executive Judge | Judge | Judge | Host |
|---|---|---|---|
| César Augusto Moniz | Marina Frangioia | Miguel Quintão | João Manzarra |

=== Contestants ===
| Finalist | Age | Hometown | Date of Elimination |
|---|---|---|---|
| Marco Ferreira | 23 | Santa Maria da Feira | Finale - Winner |
| João Lopes | 20 | Benavente | Finale - Runner-Up |
| Kelly Nakamura | 28 | Setúbal | Finale - 3rd Place |
| Mariana Paraízo | 21 | Mem Martins | Finale - 4th Place |
| Bruno Silva | 28 | Vila Nova de Gaia | 8th Week - July 18, 2010 |
| Rita "Spider" | 26 | Lisbon | 8th Week - July 18, 2010 |
| Ricardo Pereira | 21 | Alhos Vedros | 7th Week – July 11, 2010 |
| Inês Afllalo | 25 | Estoril | 7th Week - July 11, 2010 |
| Tiago Careto | 21 | Oeiras | 6th Week – July 4, 2010 |
| Tiffanie Jorge | 28 | Lisbon | 6th Week - July 2010 |
| Colin Vieira | 22 | Madeira | 5th Week – June 27, 2010 |
| Inês Carvalho | 24 | Linda-a-Velha | 5th Week - June 27, 2010 |
| Márcio Salvador | 22 | Santo António dos Cavaleiros | 4th Week - June 20, 2010 |
| Andreia Antunes | 24 | Vila Nova da Barquinha | 4th Week - June 20, 2010 |
| Diogo Leal | 19 | Póvoa de Varzim | 3rd Week - June 13, 2010 |
| Melissa Freire | 22 | Odivelas | 3rd Week - June 13, 2010 |
| Gleysson Moreira | 21 | Vila Nova de Santo André | 2nd Week - June 6, 2010 |
| Sofia Carneiro | 27 | Carcavelos | 2nd Week - June 6, 2010 |
| Bruno Abreu | 25 | Setúbal | 1st Week – May 30, 2010 |
| Cátia Fonseca | 20 | Póvoa de Varzim | 1st Week - May 30, 2010 |

=== Elimination Chart ===
| Female Contestant | Male Contestant | Bottom 3 Couples | Bottom 4 Dancers |

| Week: | 30/5 | 6/6 | 13/6 | 20/6 | 27/6 | 4/7 | 11/7 | 18/7 | 25/7 |
| Contestant | Result | | | | | | | | |
| Marco Ferreira | | | | | | | | | Winner |
| João Lopes | | | BTM | | BTM | | | BTM | Runner-Up |
| Kelly Nakamura | BTM | | | | | | | BTM | 3rd Place |
| Mariana Paraízo | BTM | BTM | | | BTM | | | | 4th Place |
| Bruno Silva | BTM | | | | | | BTM | Elim | |
| Rita “Spider" | | BTM | | BTM | BTM | | BTM | Elim | |
| Ricardo Pereira | | | BTM | BTM | | BTM | Elim | | |
| Inês Afllalo | | | | | | BTM | Elim | | |
| Tiago Careto | BTM | BTM | | | BTM | Elim | | | |
| Tiffanie Jorge | | | BTM | BTM | | Elim | | | |
| Colin Vieira | | BTM | | BTM | Elim | | | | |
| Inês Carvalho | | | BTM | | Elim | | | | |
| Márcio Salvador | | | | Elim | | | | | |
| Andreia Antunes | | | | Elim | | | | | |
| Diogo Leal | | | Elim | | | | | | |
| Melissa Freire | | | Elim | | | | | | |
| Gleysson Moreira | | Elim | | | | | | | |
| Sofia Carneiro | | Elim | | | | | | | |
| Bruno Abreu | Elim | | | | | | | | |
| Cátia Fonseca | Elim | | | | | | | | |

=== Live Performance Shows ===
The live performance show (Gala) portion of the competition began on May 30, with a Top 20 dancers. As with other shows in the So You Think You Can Dance franchise, dancers were paired into couples for duet routines (in styles drawn at random) with home viewers casting votes by phone for their favorite couples and the six dancers from the three couples receiving the lowest number of votes subject to being the two dancers sent home that week by the judge decision. These six dancers are each afforded one more thirty second solo to help effect this decision.

==== 1st Week (Top 20) – May 30, 2010 ====
| Dancers | Music | Style | Choreography |
|---|---|---|---|
| Top 20 | "Telephone" by Lady Gaga ft. Beyoncé |
| Sofia & Gleysson | "Ring - a - Ling" by The Black Eyed Peas | Hip-hop | Simeon Qsyea |
| Tiffanie & Diogo | "El Carrito" by Carlos Oliva | Salsa | Nuno & Vanda |
| Inês Carvalho & João | "Halo" by Beyoncé | Jazz | Pau Vazquez |
| Mariana & Bruno Abreu | "(You Make Me Feel) A Natural Woman" by Mary J. Blige | Waltz | Pedro Borralho |
| Rita & Colin | "I Hope I Get It" from A Chorus Line | Broadway | Pau Vazquez |
| Melissa & Ricardo | "Let's Get Loud" by Jennifer Lopez | Cha-Cha-Cha | Nuno & Vanda |
| Cátia & Tiago | "Love Lost" by The Temper Trap | Contemporary | Daniel Cardoso |
| Andreia & Márcio | "OMG" by Usher | Hip-hop | Simeon Qsyea |
| Inês Afllalo & Marco | "He´s a Pirate" from Pirates of the Caribbean | Pasodoble | Pedro Borralho |
| Kelly & Bruno Silva | "Pushing Me Away" by Linkin Park | Contemporary | Daniel Cardoso |

==== 2nd Week (Top 18) – June 6, 2010 ====
| Dancers | Music | Style | Choreography |
|---|---|---|---|
| Top 18 | "Waka Waka (This Time For Africa)" by Shakira ft. Freshlyground |
| Tiffanie & Diogo | "Maneater" by Nelly Furtado | Hip-hop Fusion | Bruno "Sky Fly" |
| Inês Afllalo & Marco | "It's Oh So Quiet" by Björk | Contemporary | Bernardo Gama |
| Sofia & Gleysson | "Más Que Nada" by Sérgio Mendes ft. The Black Eyed Peas | Samba | João Tiago |
| Andreia & Márcio | "Mein Herr" from Cabaret | Broadway | René Vinther |
| Kelly & Bruno | "Feeling Good" by Muse | Rock/Jazz | René Vinther |
| Inês Carvalho & João | "Retratamento" by Da Weasel | Hip-hop | Bruno "Sky Fly" |
| Rita & Colin | "El Tango by Roxanne" from Moulin Rouge! | Tango | João Tiago |
| Melissa & Ricardo | "Bad Romance" by Lady Gaga | Contemporary | Bernardo Gama |
| Mariana & Tiago | "Give It to Me Right" by Melanie Fiona | Jazz | René Vinther |

==== 3rd Week (Top 16) – June 13, 2010 ====
| Dancers | Music | Style | Choreography |
|---|---|---|---|
| Top 16 | "Hot N Cold" by Katy Perry |
| Kelly & Bruno | "I Know You Want Me" by Pitbull | Hip-hop | Bruno "Sky Fly" |
| Melissa & Ricardo | "Still In Love (Kissing You) by Beyoncé | Jazz | Pau Vazquez |
| Inês Carvalho & João | "Give It 2 Me" by Madonna | Pop Jazz | Pau Vazquez |
| Mariana & Tiago | "Stickwitu" das Pussycat Dolls | Rumba | João Tiago |
| Rita & Colin | "Great Balls Of Fire" by Jerry Lee Lewis | Rock n' Roll | João Tiago |
| Andreia & Márcio | "Empire State Of Mind" by Jay-Z ft. Alicia Keys | Hip-hop | Bruno "Sky Fly" |
| Inês Afllalo & Marco | "Apologize" by Timbaland & OneRepublic | Lyrical | René Vinther |
| Tiffanie & Diogo | "I Wanna Be Loved By You" by Marilyn Monroe | Foxtrot | João Tiago |

==== 4th Week (Top 14) – June 20, 2010 ====
| Dancers | Music | Style | Choreography |
|---|---|---|---|
| Top 14 | "Relax" by Frankie Goes to Hollywood |
| Andreia & Márcio | "Mercy" by Duffy | Contemporary | Simeon Qsyea |
| Rita & Colin | "Fever" by Beyoncé | Jazz | Pau Vazquez |
| Tiffanie & Ricardo | "Knock on Wood" by Amii Stewart | Disco | Tatiana |
| Mariana & Tiago | "Bleeding Love" by Leona Lewis | Hip-hop | Bruno "Sky Fly" |
| Kelly & Bruno | "Lady Marmalade" from Moulin Rouge! | Broadway | Pau Vazquez |
| Inês Afllalo & Marco | "Rock You Like a Hurricane" by Scorpions | Jazz Fusion | Pau Vazquez |
| Inês Carvalho & João | "Footloose" by Kenny Loggins | Jive | Pedro Borralho |

==== 5th Week (Top 12) – June 27, 2010 ====
| Dancers | Music | Style | Choreography |
|---|---|---|---|
| Top 12 | "You Can't Stop The Beat" (Hairspray) |
| Top 6 Masculino | "Whatcha Say" by Jason Derulo | Hip-hop | Miguel "Xinês" |
| Top 6 Feminino | "Jai Ho (You Are My Destiny)" by A.R. Rahman & Pussycat Dolls | Bollywood | Diana Rêgo |
| Inês Carvalho & João | "Wanna Love You" by Akon | Hip-hop | Miguel "Xinês" |
| Mariana & Tiago | "Maniac" by Michael Sembello (Flashdance) | Jazz | Pau Vazquez |
| Inês Afllalo & Marco | "Fix You" by Coldplay | Contemporary | Daniel Cardoso |
| Tiffanie & Ricardo | "Funhouse" by Pink | Pop Jazz | René Vinther |
| Rita & Colin | "You'll Follow Me Down" by Skunk Anansie | Contemporary | Daniel Cardoso |
| Kelly & Bruno | "Crazy In Love" by Beyoncé | Pop Jazz | Pau Vazquez |

==== 6th Week (Top 10) – July 4, 2010 ====
At this point in the competition new partners began to be assigned weekly, and voting was made by individual dancers rather than for couples. The judge's also lost their authority to choose who would be eliminated from the bottom dancers each week, with eliminations decided solely on viewer votes. Dance styles continued to be randomly assigned and all remaining dancers performed a solo each week, regardless of whether they were in the bottom dancers.

| Dancers | Music | Style | Choreography |
|---|---|---|---|
| Inês & Tiago | "I Got You" by Leona Lewis | Jazz | Pau Vazquez |
| Inês & Tiago | "Dies Irae" by Karl Jenkins | Pasodoble |
| Rita & Marco | "Iris" by Goo Goo Dolls | Contemporary | Daniel Cardoso |
| Rita & Marco | "No Air" by Jordin Sparks ft. Chris Brown | Hip-hop Fusion |
| Tiffanie & Bruno | "Don't Stop The Music" by Rihanna | Hip-hop |
| Tiffanie & Bruno | "Hero" by Enrique Iglesias | Rumba |
| Kelly & Ricardo | "Cell Block Tango" from Chicago | Broadway |
| Kelly & Ricardo | "I'm Yours" by Jason Mraz | Contemporary |
| Mariana & João | "Sweet Dreams" by Beyoncé | Pop-Jazz |
| Mariana & João | "I Don't Believe You" by Pink | Lyrical |

==== 7th Week (Top 8) – July 11, 2010 ====
| Dancers | Music | Style | Choreography |
|---|---|---|---|
| Inês & Bruno | "If I Were a Boy" by Beyoncé | Lyrical |
| Inês & Bruno | "Santa Maria (Del Buen Ayre)" by Gotan Project | Tango |
| Mariana & Marco | "Good Golly, Miss Molly" by Little Richard | Rock 'n' roll |
| Mariana & Marco | "You Found Me" by The Fray | Contemporary |
| Kelly & João | "Just Dance" by Lady Gaga ft. Colby O'Donis | Cha-Cha-Cha |
| Kelly & João | "Closer" by Ne-Yo | Hip-hop Fusion |
| Rita & Ricardo | "Cry Me A River" by Justin Timberlake | Hip-hop |
| Rita & Ricardo | "You've Got The Love" by Florence and the Machine | Contemporary |

==== 8th Week (Top 6) – July 18, 2010 ====
| Dancers | Music | Style | Choreography |
|---|---|---|---|
| Top 6 | "Tetsujin" by Juno Reactor & Don Davis |
| Kelly & Bruno | "Hot Honey Rag" by Chicago | Quickstep |
| Kelly & Bruno | "My Life Would Suck Without You" by Kelly Clarkson | Jazz |
| Mariana & João | "Unfaithful" by Rihanna | Lyrical |
| Mariana & João | "Cabaret" by Liza Minnelli | Broadway |
| Rita & Marco | "Use Somebody" by Kings of Leon | Contemporary |
| Rita & Marco | "Mare" by The Black Eyed Peas | Hip-hop |

==== 9th Week (Top 4/Grand Finale) - July 25, 2010 ====
The Top Four Grand Finale featured the dancers coupled in every combination for duets as well as solo performances. Marco Ferreira was ultimately announced winner of the competition and “Portugal's Favorite Dancer.”

| Dancers | Music | Style | Choreography |
|---|---|---|---|
| Top 20 | "Hung Up" by Madonna |
| Top 20, Judges & Manzarra | "Fame" by Irene Cara (Fame) |
| Top 4 | "Sing Sing Sing" by Bob Fosse |
| Kelly & Marco | "Carmina Burana" by Carl Orff | Pasodoble |
| Kelly & João | "Meo Suo i Eyrum" by Sigur Ros | Lyrical |
| Mariana & Marco | "Clocks" by Coldplay | Contemporary |
| Mariana & João | "Father Figure" by George Michael | Rumba |
| Kelly & Mariana | "One" by A Chorus Line | Broadway |
| João & Marco | "Rock Your Body" by Black Eyed Peas | Hip-hop |

== Season 2 ==
=== Judges and Presenter ===
| Judge | Judge | Judge | Host |
|---|---|---|---|
| Marco Silva | Rita Blanco | Joaquín Cortés | Diana Chaves |

=== Contestants ===
| Finalist | Age | Hometown | Date of Elimination |
|---|---|---|---|
| Tiago Careto | 26 | Oeiras | 1st week - February 8, 2015 |
| Cristina Unguriano | 21 | Montijo | 1st week - February 8, 2015 |

=== Elimination Chart ===
| Female Contestant | Male Contestant | Bottom 3 Couples | Bottom 4 Dancers | Top 2 Dancers |

| Week: | 8/2 | 15/2 | 22/2 | 1/3 | 8/3 | 15/3 | 22/3 | 29/3 | 5/4 |
| Contestant | Result | | | | | | | | |
| Liliana Garcia | | | BTM | | BTM | TOP | | | WINNER |
| Vítor Duarte | | | | | BTM | TOP | | | Runner-Up |
| Gonçalo Cabral | | | | | | BTM | | | 3rd Place |
| Carlota Carreira | | BTM | BTM | BTM | | | BTM | | 4th Place |
| Fausto de Sousa | BTM | BTM | | BTM | | | BTM | Elim | |
| Catarina Lima | | | | | | BTM | | Elim | |
| Fábio Januário | | | BTM | BTM | BTM | | Elim | | |
| Inês Gameiro | | BTM | | | BTM | | Elim | | |
| Paulo Aguiar | | BTM | | | | Elim | | | |
| Carla Ferreira | | | | | | Elim | | | |
| Gonçalo Pinela | | | | | Elim | | | | |
| Joana de Lima | BTM | | | BTM | Elim | | | | |
| Vadim Potapov | BTM | | BTM | Elim | | | | | |
| Susana Maia | | | | Elim | | | | | |
| Ivanoel Tavares | | | Elim | | | | | | |
| Albertina Costa | | | Elim | | | | | | |
| Ivo da Fonte | | Elim | | | | | | | |
| Maria Antunes | BTM | Elim | | | | | | | |
| Tiago Careto | Elim | | | | | | | | |
| Cristina Ungureanu | Elim | | | | | | | | |

=== Live Performance Shows ===
The live performance show (Gala) portion of the competition began on May 30, with a Top 20 dancers. As with other shows in the So You Think You Can Dance franchise, dancers were paired into couples for duet routines (in styles drawn at random) with home viewers casting votes by phone for their favorite couples and the six dancers from the three couples receiving the lowest number of votes subject to being the two dancers sent home that week by the judge decision. These six dancers are each afforded one more ten second solo to help effect this decision.

== See also ==
- Dance on television

=== Similar shows ===
- The Ultimate Dance Battle
- Live to Dance/Got to Dance
- America's Best Dance Crew
- Superstars of Dance
- Dance India Dance
- Se Ela Dança, Eu Danço
