= Diogo Piçarra =

Portuguese singer (born 1990)

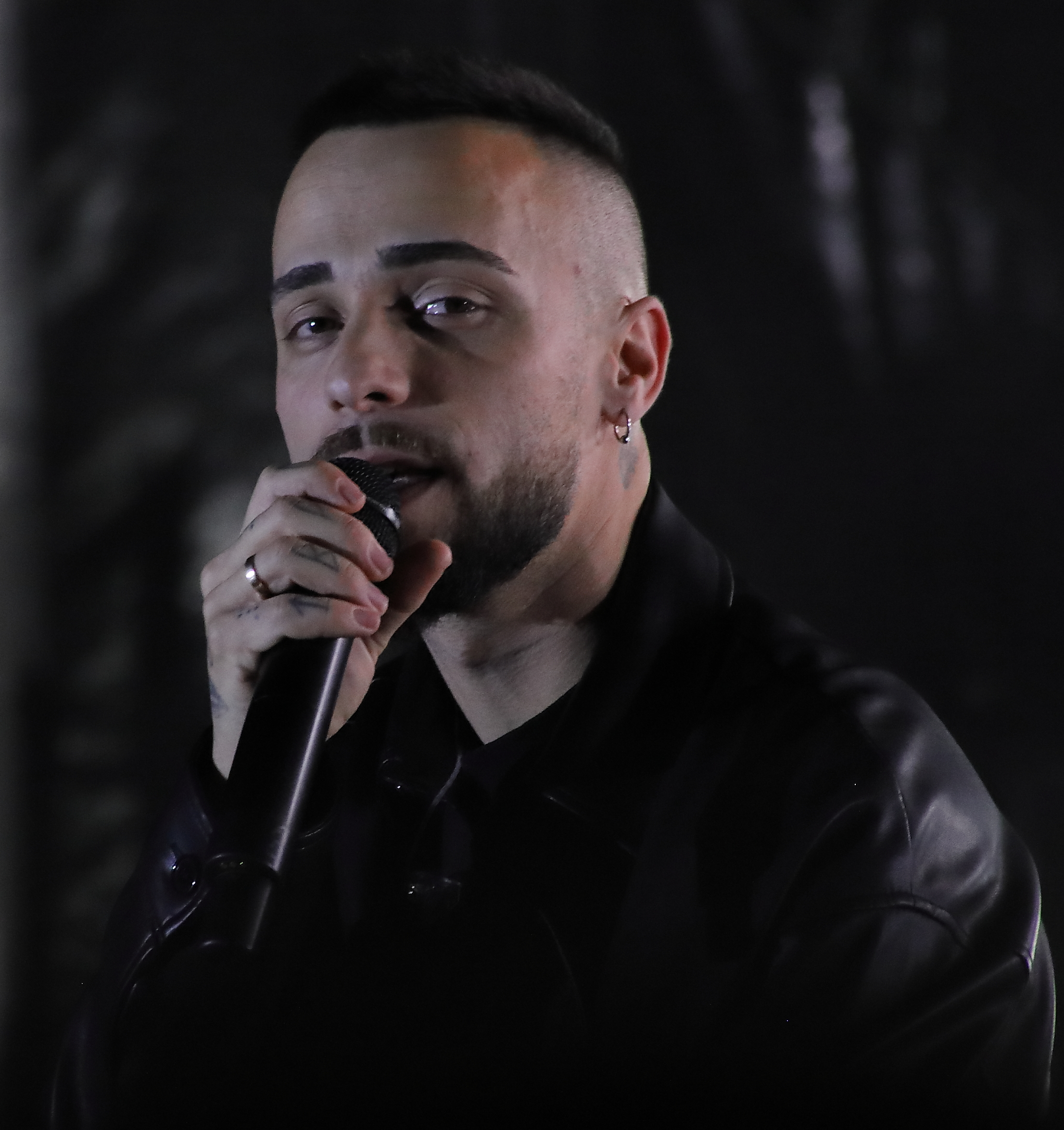
- Piçarra in 2023

Background information
- Born: Diogo Piçarra; 19 October 1990 (age 35); Faro, Portugal
- Origin: Portugal
- Genres: Pop; Electropop; Pop rock
- Occupation: Singer
- Instrument: Vocals, guitar, piano
- Years active: 2006–present
- Label: Universal Music Portugal
- Website: www.universalmusic.pt/artista/diogopicarra

Diogo Piçarra (born 19 October 1990) is a Portuguese singer. He rose to fame after winning the fifth season of Ídolos, the Portuguese version of Pop Idol in 2012.

== Biography ==
Diogo Piçarra was born in Faro. As a 17-year-old, he formed the band "Fora da Bóia". While studying at the University of Algarve, he took a semester abroad to pursue his studies at Palacký University in the Czech Republic.

In 2009, Piçarra competed on season three of Ídolos, Portugal's version of Pop Idol. He got to the piano phase of the competition and was eliminated. In 2010, he participated in the music TV contest Operação Triunfo, but did not get through to the first round. In 2012, he tried for the third time and won season five of Ídolos. As a prize, he won a car and a scholarship to a music course in London.

He released his first album, Espelho, in March 2015, which debuted at number one on the Portuguese music charts. In the end of March 2017, he released his second album, do=s, collaborating with artists such as Valas on "Ponto de Partida" and April Ivy on "Não Sou Eu".

In 2017, he tattooed the face of the late Chester Bennington from Linkin Park on his leg to pay homage to him, stating that this was one of his childhood heroes.

In January 2018, it was announced that Piçarra would participate in Festival da Canção 2018, singing a song that he composed, called "Canção do Fim". This was his first attempt at this competition, which allows the winner to participate in Eurovision Song Contest 2018 in Lisbon. Days before the Grand Final of Festival da Canção 2018, and after winning the second semi-final with the maximum score, he decided to leave the competition, due to accusations that he had plagiarised "Open Your Eyes", a 1976 song performed by the Maranatha Singers.

From 2019 to 2023, Piçarra was featured as a coach on The Voice Portugal. Since 2025, Piçarra has been a coach on the kids version of the show. He was the winning coach in 2026 when his artist Salvador Rio won the season.

== Discography ==
=== Albums ===
Title	Details	Peak chart positions	Certifications
Title	Details	POR	Certifications
Espelho (Mirror)	Released: 16 March 2015; Label: Universal	1	AFP: Platinum
do=s (Two)	Released: 31 March 2017; Label: Universal	1	AFP: Platinum
South Side Boy	Released: 29 November 2019; Label: Universal	1	
Sntmntl	Released: 1 March 2024; Label: Universal	15	

=== Singles ===
==== As lead artist ====
List of singles as lead artist, with selected chart positions and certifications, showing year released and album name
Title	Year	Peak chart positions	Certifications	Album
Title	Year	POR	Certifications	Album
"Dialeto"	2016	27	AFP: Platinum	do=s
"200"	2017	97		do=s
"Dois"	2017	72		do=s
"Caminho"	2017	87		do=s
"Erro"	2017	78		do=s
"História"	2017	43	AFP: Platinum	do=s
"Já Não Falamos"	2017	49		do=s
"Não Sou Eu" (featuring April Ivy)	2017	70		do=s
"Ponto de Partida" (featuring Valas)	2017	95		do=s
"Só Existo Contigo"	2017	47		do=s
"Canção do Fim"	2017	—		Festival da Canção 2018
"Paraíso"	2018	39		Non-album single(s)
"A Dónde Vas" (with António José)	2019	76		Non-album single(s)
"Coração"	2019	68		Non-album single(s)
"—" denotes a recording that did not chart or was not released in that territory.

==== As featured artist ====
List of singles as featured artist, with selected chart positions and certifications
Title	Year	Peak chart positions	Album
Title	Year	POR	Album
"Entre as Estrelas" (Jimmy P featuring Diogo Piçarra)	2016	91	Essência
"Wall Of Love" (Karetus featuring Diogo Piçarra)	2016	65	Non-album single(s)
"Não Sei" (Mia Rose featuring Diogo Piçarra)	2017	—	Tudo Para Dar
"Trevo (Tu)" (Anavitória featuring Diogo Piçarra)	2017	—	Non-album single(s)
"Até ao Fim" (Agir featuring Diogo Piçarra)	2018	10	No Fame
"Aqui" (Jão featuring Diogo Piçarra)	2018	—	Lobos
"—" denotes a recording that did not chart or was not released in that territory.
