= Idolos season 6 =

Idolos
- Season 6
- Hosted by: João Manzarra
- Judges: Pedro Boucherie Mendes; Maria João Bastos; Paulo Ventura
- Winner: João Couto
- Runner-up: Sara Martins

Release
- Original network: SIC
- Original release: April 12 – August 23, 2015

Season chronology
- ← Previous; Season 5 Next → Season 7

The sixth season of Ídolos aired in 2015. João Manzarra was the presenter.

== Semifinals Round ==
All the 20 finalists performed live at MEO Arena, but only 12 were chosen by the judges to perform at the live shows.

Order	Contestant	Song	Result
1	Carolina Bernardo	"One and Only"	Advanced
2	Mário Pedrosa	"Time Is Running Out"	Advanced
3	Francisco Rodrigues	"Dia Mau"	Eliminated
4	Miguel M. dos Santos	"Drops of Jupiter"	Advanced
5	Mafalda Portela	"Bang Bang"	Advanced
6	João Couto	"Dancing in the Dark"	Advanced
7	Paulo Sousa	"Just the Way You Are"	Advanced
8	Paloma Nunes	"Fuckin' Perfect"	Eliminated
9	Andresa Tavares	"Deeper"	Advanced
10	Luís Travassos	"Não Invoquem o Amor em Vão"	Advanced
11	Maria Elisa Silva	"Habits"	Eliminated
12	Carolina Canhão	"Right to Be Wrong"	Eliminated
13	Laura Lopes	" "	Eliminated
14	Albert "Tinho"	"That's How We Roll"	Wild Card
15	Nelson Pereira	"Run"	Wild Card
16	Gonçalo Santos	"Wicked Game"	Advanced
17	Pedro Cau	"Pray"	Eliminated
18	Sara Martins	"You and I"	Advanced
19	Maria Medeiros	"Busy"	Wild Card
20	Rita Nascimento	"Son of a Preacher Man"	Wild Card

== Finalists ==
João Couto (born 1995) is from Vila Nova de Gaia. For him, the hardest part of Ídolos was group stage. He wasn't seen as an Idol for many people, due to his look, but he improved a lot during the competition. He was announced as the winner on August 23, 2015. He is the fifth male winner, after the six seasons. Couto had never been in the bottom 2 or 3 until the Finale.

Sara Martins (born 1996) is from Barcelos. She did not audition, but she entered in the competition in the Theatre Round. She was asked to sing twice, in order for the judges to be able to qualify her and she sang "Creep" in a second performance. The judges all made huge compliments on her performance. She was in the Bottom 3, alongside Gonçalo and Albert, in the Top 11 round, and she was in the bottom 2, alongside Rita, in the Top 5 round.

Paulo Sousa (born 1991) is from Coimbra. He had already participated on the second season of Factor X (Portugal), but he was eliminated before the Finals. On the Top 9 round, the judges said he was too comfortable with his fan base that his performances were not improving. That night, he was in the bottom 3, but the following week, he gave one amazing performance, making the judges happy with his evolution. He was in the bottom 2, in the Semifinals Round, alongside Luís.

== Finals ==
=== Top 12 - This Is Me ===
The six finalists with the highest number of votes (by the viewers) were automatically in the Top 10. Among the remaining 9, the judges have chosen 4 contestants to keep.

Order	Contestant	Song	Result
1	Eva Stuart	"Black or White"	Saved by Judges
2	Beatriz Almeida	"Eu Sei Que Vou Te Amar"	Saved by Judges
3	Eduardo Gonçalves	"The House of the Rising Sun"	Safe
4	Miguel Pavia	"O Tempo Vai Esperar"	Safe
5	Diana Silva	"A Million Dreams"	Eliminated
6	Juliana Anjo	"Canção de Embalar"	Safe
7	Mário Pedrosa	"Take Me to Church"	Saved by Judges
8	Carolina Cardoso	"Bohemian Rhapsody"	Safe
9	Caco	"Sorte Grande"	Eliminated
10	Fábio Augusto	"Waiting on the World to Change"	Safe
11	Ana Rangel	"Easy on Me"	Eliminated
12	João Gonçalves	"És do Mundo"	Eliminated
13	Diana Mendes	"Words as Weapons"	Saved by Judges
14	Gabriela Lemos	"Good 4 U"	Safe
15	Nuno Oliveira	"Heaven"	Eliminated

=== Top 11 (first week) - Cinema ===
Mafalda Portela was the contestant with the lowest number of votes, however, during her "saving performance", the judges interrupted it to say that they would keep her for another week. Carolina Bernardo and Miguel Moura dos Santo were both in the bottom 3.

Order	Contestant	Song	Featured Movie	Result
1	Carolina Bernardo	"My Heart Will Go On"	Titanic	Bottom 3
2	Mário Pedrosa	"Gone, Gone, Gone"	The Amazing Spider-Man	Safe
3	Paulo Sousa	"Angel"	City of Angels	Safe
4	Mafalda Portela	"Bring Me to Life"	Daredevil	Saved
5	João Couto	"She"	Notting Hill	Safe
6	Luís Travassos	"O Mundo ao Contrário"	Sorte Nula	Safe
7	Sara Martins	"Yellow Flicker Beat"	The Hunger Games	Safe
8	Miguel M. Santos	"See You Again"	Fast & Furious 7	Bottom 3
9	Albert "Tinho"	"Happy"	Despicable Me 2	Safe
10	Rita Nascimento	"There You'll Be"	Pearl Harbor	Safe
11	Gonçalo Santos	"The Blower's Daughter"	Closer	Safe

=== Top 11 (second week) - Summer Festivals ===
Albert Tinho and Gonçalo Santos were the two finalists leaving the competition. Albert's name was the first to be revealed, but that doesn't necessarily mean that he was in 11th place. Sara Martins was shockingly in the bottom 3 and really close to be eliminated.

Order	Contestant	Song	Result
1	Sara Martins	"Dog Days Are Over"	Bottom 3
2	Paulo Sousa	"Hold Back the River"	Safe
3	Carolina Bernardo	"Titanium"	Safe
4	Miguel M. Santos	"I Will Wait"	Safe
5	Mafalda Portela	"Dark Horse"	Safe
6	João Couto	"Do I Wanna Know?"	Safe
7	Gonçalo Santos	"Numb"	Eliminated
8	Albert "Tinho"	"Raggamuffin"	Eliminated
9	Rita Nascimento	"I Try"	Safe
10	Luís Travassos	"Amiga da Minha Mulher"	Safe
11	Mário Pedrosa	"Radioactive"	Safe

=== Top 9 - Dedications ===
Mário Pedrosa is the fourth contestant to the leave the competition. Many people consider this one of the most shocking eliminations of the season, because Mário had never been in the bottom 3 in the first three live shows and many considered him a potential finalist. Rita Nascimento was also in the bottom 3 and Paulo Sousa was in the bottom 3 for the first time.

Order	Contestant	Song	Result
1	Mário Pedrosa	"Ho Hey"	Eliminated
2	Sara Martins	"A Pele Que Há em Mim"	Safe
3	João Couto	"Reader's Digest"	Safe
4	Rita Nascimento	"Caçador de Sóis"	Bottom 3
5	Paulo Sousa	"Lay Me Down"	Bottom 3
6	Mafalda Portela	"With Ur Love"	Safe
7	Miguel M. Santos	"Para Os Braços da Minha Mãe"	Safe
8	Luís Travassos	"Maria"	Safe
9	Carolina Bernardo	"Your Song"	Safe

=== Top 8 - 80's ===
Mafalda Portela was, once again, eliminated by the viewers, but, this time, there was no possible save. Curiously, she was, once again, in the bottom 3 with both Carolina Bernardo and Miguel Moura dos Santos.

Order	Contestant	Song	Result
1	Mafalda Portela	"Flashdance... What a Feeling"	Eliminated
2	João Couto	"Fast Car"	Safe
3	Sara Martins	"Ain't Nobody"	Safe
4	Carolina Bernardo	"Girls Just Want to Have Fun"	Bottom 3
5	Miguel M. Santos	"Summer of '69"	Bottom 3
6	Rita Nascimento	"Alone"	Safe
7	Paulo Sousa	"Sweet Dreams (Are Made of This)"	Safe
8	Luís Travassos	"Chico Fininho"	Safe

=== Top 7 - Guilty Pleasures ===
Miguel Moura dos Santos was eliminated this week, after being in the bottom 3 two times. He was in the bottom 3 with Carolina Bernardo and with Luís Travassos, who had never been in the bottom players until this point.

Order	Contestant	Song	Result
1	João Couto	"Careless Whisper"	Safe
2	Luís Travassos	"Criatura da Noite"	Bottom 3
3	Rita Nascimento	"One Day in Your Life"	Safe
4	Sara Martins	"Wrecking Ball"	Safe
5	Paulo Sousa	"...Baby One More Time"	Safe
6	Miguel M. Santos	"I Want It That Way"	Eliminated
7	Carolina Bernardo	"Bad Case of Loving You"	Bottom 3

=== Top 6 - Viewers' Choice and Judges' Choice ===
Carolina Bernardo was the seventh finalist to leave the competition. She was in the bottom 3 with Rita Nascimento and Luís Travassos. This was the first time that the contestants sang two songs. It was revealed the Top 3 of the night which included Sara Martins, João Couto and Paulo Sousa (who ended up being the real Top 3 of the game).

Order	Contestant	Song	Result
1	Luís Travassos	"Às Vezes"	Bottom 3
2	Carolina Bernardo	"Habits"	Eliminated
3	Sara Martins	"Love Me Like You Do"	Safe
4	João Couto	"Nothing Really Matters"	Safe
5	Rita Nascimento	"Blank Space"	Bottom 3
6	Paulo Sousa	"Earned It"	Safe
7	Sara Martins	"Something's Got a Hold on Me"	Safe
8	João Couto	"Blurred Lines"	Safe
9	Paulo Sousa	"Somebody to Love"	Safe
10	Carolina Bernardo	"Primavera"	Eliminated
11	Luís Travassos	"La Tortura"	Bottom 3
12	Rita Nascimento	"Everybody Hurts"	Bottom 3

=== Top 5 - Madonna vs Michael Jackson ===
Rita Nascimento sadly abandons the competition really close to the end, in 5th place. She was in the bottom 2 with Sara Martins, who wasn't in the bottom contestants for five weeks.

Order	Contestant	Song	Result
1	Paulo Sousa	"Man in the Mirror"	Safe
2	Sara Martins	"I Want You Back"	Bottom 2
3	Rita Nascimento	"The Way You Make Me Feel"	Eliminated
4	João Couto	"Billie Jean"	Safe
5	Luís Travassos	"Black or White"	Safe
6	João Couto	"La Isla Bonita"	Safe
7	Paulo Sousa	"Four Minutes"	Safe
8	Rita Nascimento	"Like a Prayer"	Eliminated
9	Luís Travassos	"Heartbreak City"	Safe
10	Sara Martins	"Sorry"	Bottom 2

=== Top 4 - Duets / Year They Were Born ===
Order	Contestant	Song	Artist / Year	Result
1	João Couto	"Ela Queria"	Virgem Suta	Safe
2	Sara Martins	"Próxima Estação"	João Só	Safe
3	Paulo Sousa	"Amanhecer"	Susana Félix	Bottom 2
4	Luís Travassos	"O Amor Não é Somente o Amor"	Cuca Roseta	Eliminated
5	Sara Martins	"Don't Speak"	1996	Safe
6	Luís Travassos	"Nasce Selvagem"	1990	Eliminated
7	João Couto	"Ironic"	1995	Safe
8	Paulo Sousa	"Frágil"	1991	Bottom 2

=== Top 3 - Finale (Part 1) ===
Order	Contestant	Song	Result
1	Sara Martins	"Valerie"	Safe
2	João Couto	"Pica do 7"	Safe
3	Paulo Sousa	"Cry Me a River"	Eliminated
4	João Couto	"Englishman in New York"	Safe
5	Paulo Sousa	"Just The Way You Are"	Eliminated
6	Sara Martins	"You and I"	Safe

=== Top 2 - Finale (Part 2) ===
Order	Contestant	Song	Result
1	João Couto	"Something"	Winner
2	Sara Martins	"Cosmic Love"	Runner-Up

== Elimination chart ==
Female	Male	Top 12	Safe on Wild Card stage

Safe	Bottom	Eliminated	Judges' Save

Stage:		Semifinal	Top 12^{2}										
Week:		14/06^{1}	21/06	28/06^{3}	05/07	12/07	19/07	26/07	02/08	09/08	16/08	23/08^{4}	
Place	Contestant	Results											
1	João Couto	Top 12											Winner
2	Sara Martins	Top 12			Bottom 3					Bottom 2			Runner-Up
3	Paulo Sousa	Top 12				Bottom 3					Bottom 2	Elim	
4	Luís Travassos	Top 12						Bottom 3	Bottom 3		Elim		
5	Rita Nascimento	Wild Card	Bottom 3			Bottom 3			Bottom 3	Elim			
6	Carolina Bernardo	Top 12		Bottom 3			Bottom 3	Bottom 3	Elim				
7	Miguel M. Santos	Top 12		Bottom 3			Bottom 3	Elim					
8	Mafalda Portela	Top 12		Saved			Elim						
9	Mário Pedrosa	Top 12				Elim							
10-11	Gonçalo Santos	Top 12	Bottom 3		Elim								
10-11	Albert "Tinho"	Wild Card			Elim								
12	Andresa Tavares	Top 12	Elim										
13-14	Nelson Pereira	Elim											
13-14	Maria Medeiros	Elim											
15-20	Francisco Rodrigues	Elim											
15-20	Paloma Nunes	Elim											
15-20	Maria Elisa Silva	Elim											
15-20	Carolina Canhão	Elim											
15-20	Laura Lopes	Elim											
15-20	Pedro Cau	Elim											

- ^Note 1 On June 14, the judges picked the Top 12, however, only 10 were chosen directly to perform on the live shows. Albert and Nelson sang once again and only Albert went through. The same situation happened with Rita and Maria, having Rita been chosen to the Top 12. This were the two Wild Card picks.
- ^Note 2 During the live shows, João Manzarra only revealed the bottom three and the eliminated player. It has never been told which contestant had been in the bottom two with the eliminated one.
- ^Note 3 On June 28, Mafalda Portela was the contestant with the fewest votes. However, the judges decided to use their only save on her. That decision meant that two singers would have to be eliminated the following week (Gonçalo and Albert).
- ^Note 4 On August 23, the three finalists all performed two times. After those two performances, the contestant with the lowest number of votes was revealed to be Paulo Sousa, ending in third place. After that, the voting lines were reopened and João and Sara, the Top 2, sang another time. The final results were the combination of the votes received by them until Paulo's elimination and the votes received after that.

== Controversy ==
On May 3, 2015, during the show's broadcast with a new episode, a 16-year-old contestant by the name of Alexandre Rebelo who had prominent ears auditioned to be on the show previously on March 27, 2015. Alexandre's grandmother gave him authorization to be in the casting, but he did not get to sing in front of the juries. He instead simply sung on camera with the song: "Diamonds" by Rihanna.

But what Alexandre didn't expect, the TV producers were bullying and making fun of him solely because of his hard of hearing. The TV producers went out of their way and maliciously decided to add a special effect via post-production onto Alexandre by inflating his ears in a much bigger size while he was still singing and the producers even added inappropriate cartoon-like background music without his knowledge and consent as the episode was being publicly broadcast across the entire country as for "humor." This embarrassed and humiliated Rebelo up to the point where he was skipping school and could not even leave his own home. He was very displeased upon seeing what happened during the episode when it was first broadcast, along with his grandmother who was in great despair crying because Alexandre always got bullied in school because of his ears.

SIC and FremantleMedia has since claimed that they regret pulling the move. On the Facebook page of the show however, several outraged comments were posted by many users forcing the producers of the show to apologize for such incident and for humiliating Alexandre. They apologized to the grandmother but she told them that an apology will simply not be enough to cover the damages that have been done towards her grandson. She wants true justice upon Alexandre's suffering and the following incident that was caused is going to be at a high cost.

A campaign has started by Alexandre himself to fight against bullying regarding SIC's action.

Preceded by Season 5	Ídolos	Succeeded by -
