= Paulo Sousa (singer) =

Portuguese singer

- Born: 31 October 1991 (age 34); Coimbra, Portugal
- Genres: Pop
- Occupations: Singer; YouTuber
- Instruments: Vocals; piano; guitar; clarinet
- Label: Farol Música (Media Capital Entertainment)
- Website: paulosousa.net

Paulo Sousa (born 31 October 1991) is a Portuguese singer and YouTuber. He placed third in the sixth season of Ídolos, the Portuguese version of the U.S. TV series American Idol.

== Nominations and awards ==
Year	Award	Category	Result
2013	VidYou Festival	Music	Won
2015	VidYou Festival	Music	Won
2016	VidYou Festival	Music	Won
2017	VidYou Festival	Music	Pending
2017	2017 Kids' Choice Awards	Favorite YouTuber (Portugal)	Nominated

== Discography ==
=== Studio albums ===
List of studio albums, with selected details and chart positions
Title	Year	Peak chart positions
Title	Year	POR
Teu	2018	1

=== Singles ===
List of singles, with selected details and chart positions
Title	Year	Peak chart positions	Album
Title	Year	POR	Album
"Todos os Dias"	2016	—	Non-album single
"Onde Quero Estar"	2016	–	Non-album single
"Não Me Deixes Ir"	2016	90	Non-album single
"Eu Não Vou"	2017	–	Non-album single
"Somos Tu e Eu" (feat. WAZE)	2017	–	Non-album single
"—" denotes a recording that did not chart or was not released in that territory.
