= Filipe Pinto =

Filipe Miranda Cunha Pinto known as Filipe Pinto (born in São Mamede de Infesta, Matosinhos municipality, Portugal on 3 July 1988) is a Portuguese singer that won season 3 of the Portuguese reality television music competition series Ídolos in 2010. He won the 2013 MTV Europe Music Award for the Best Portuguese Act.

== Ídolos ==
Pinto auditioned with the Pearl Jam song "Better Man".

During the gala live shows, he sang:

- Gala 1: Radiohead - "High and Dry"
- Gala 2: Smashing Pumpkins - "Disarm"
- Gala 3: Foo Fighters - "Times Like These"
- Gala 4: Michael Jackson - "Billie Jean"
- Gala 5: Zeca Afonso - "Venham mais Cinco"
- Gala 6: Amy Winehouse - "Valerie"
- Gala 7: Roberto Carlos - "Quero que tudo vá Pro Inferno" / U2 - "With or Without You"
- Gala 8: Guns N' Roses - "Sweet Child o' Mine" / Incubus - "Drive"
- Gala 9: Carlos Santana - "Smooth" / Ornatos Violeta - "Ouvi Dizer" / Oasis - "Don't Look Back in Anger"
- Gala 10: Whitesnake - "Here I Go Again" (as a duet with Diana) / Goo Goo Dolls - "Iris" / Nirvana - "Lithium" / Pedro Abrunhosa - "Eu Não Sei Quem Te Perdeu" (in duet with Pedro Abrunhosa)
- Gala 12: Bush - "Letting the Cables Sleep" / Pearl Jam - "Better Man" / Ornatos Violeta - "Ouvi Dizer"

He won the final against Diana Piedade. In addition to a record contract, he won a 6-month scholarship to study music at London College of Music. In March 2010, Ídolos also released the compilation album Ídolos Os Melhores Momentos that included Pinto's interpretation of "Ouvi Dizer".

== After Ídolos ==
After the finals, he took part in a tour with the rest of the finalists. He also took part in a series of festivals in 2011 including Super Bock Super Rock and Festival Sudoeste. After his win, he completed his education with a degree in Forestry from University of Trás-os-Montes and Alto Douro.

His debut commercial single was "Insónia" followed by his debut studio album Cerne on Farol Records in 2012.

== Discography ==
=== Albums ===
Title	Year	Peak
Title	Year	POR
Cerne	2012	2
Planeta limpo	2014	25
E tudo gira	2016	12

=== Singles ===
- 2012: "Insónia"
- 2015: "E Tudo Gira"
- 2017: "Amor tem Si"
