= Idolos season 4 =

Idolos
- Season 4
- Hosted by: João Manzarra; Cláudia Vieira
- Judges: Manuel Moura dos Santos; Laurent Felipe; Roberta Medina; Pedro Boucherie
- Winner: Sandra Pereira
- Runner-up: Martim Vicente

Release
- Original network: SIC
- Original release: September 12 – December 31, 2010

Season chronology
- ← Previous; Season 3 Next → Season 5

The fourth season of Ídolos premiered in September 12, 2010, on SIC, with the castings held in Lisbon, Portugal. Sandra Pereira won the show, making her the first female winner of the series. The runner-up was Martim Vicente, who was the judges' wildcard choice to make the top 10.

== Judges ==
- Manuel Moura dos Santos
- Laurent Filipe - Musician
- Roberta Medina - Director of Rock in Rio
- Pedro Boucherie - Director of the cable TV stations of SIC.
- Ídolos 2010 - Season 4 Official website

=== Top 14 (Idols' Choice) ===
Order	Contestant	Song	Result
1	Joceline Medina	"Don't Stop the Music"	Safe
2	Gonçalo Dias	"Feel"	Safe
3	Maria Manuel	"Because The Night"	Safe
4	Maria Bradshaw	"Bridge Over Troubled Water"	Safe
5	Ricardo Costa	"Best of You"	Wild Card
6	Sandra Pereira	"You Had Me"	Safe
7	Mónica Ribeiro	"Your Song"	Wild Card
8	Adriano Correia	"Stronger Than Me"	Safe
9	Carolina Deslandes	"Ain't No Other Man"	Safe
10	Gerson Santos	"Here Without You"	Safe
11	Raquel Pinho	"Warwick Avenue"	Wild Card
12	Martim Vicente	"Steal My Kisses"	Wild Card
13	Neemias Silva	"What's Left of Me"	Safe
14	Maria Sturkën	"Use Somebody"	Eliminated

==== Wild Card ====
Order	Contestant	Song	Result
1	Ricardo Costa	"Best of You"	Eliminated
2	Mónica Ribeiro	"Your Song"	Eliminated
3	Raquel Pinho	"Warwick Avenue"	Eliminated
2	Martim Vicente	"Steal My Kisses"	Safe

=== Top 10 (80's) ===
Order	Contestant	Song	Result
1	Sandra Pereira	"Nowhere Fast"	Safe
2	Gerson Santos	"Somebody"	Eliminated
3	Maria Manuel	"All Night Long"	Safe
4	Neemias Silva	"Free Fallin'"	Safe
5	Carolina Deslandes	"Master Blaster"	Safe
6	Martim Vicente	"O Corpo é Que Paga"	Safe
7	Maria Bradshaw	"The Greatest Love of All"	Bottom 2
8	Adriano Correia	"Holding Out for a Hero"	Safe
9	Joceline Medina	"Livin' on a Prayer"	Safe
10	Gonçalo Dias	"I Want to Break Free"	Safe

=== Top 9 (Cinema) ===
Order	Contestant	Song	Result
1	Neemias Silva	"Hero"	Safe
2	Carolina Deslandes	"Angel"	Safe
3	Joceline Medina	"I Will Survive"	Safe
4	Gonçalo Dias	"She"	Safe
5	Maria Bradshaw	"It's Raining Men"	Safe
6	Martim Vicente	"Se Eu Fosse Um Dia o Teu Olhar"	Safe
7	Maria Manuel	"Accidentally in Love"	Eliminated
8	Sandra Pereira	"Wicked Game"	Safe
9	Adriano Diouf	"Kiss From a Rose"	Bottom 2

=== Top 8 (Worldwide Music) ===
Order	Contestant	Song	Result
1	Gonçalo Dias	"Hound Dog"	Eliminated
2	Joceline Medina	"Lua"	Bottom 2
3	Maria Bradshaw	"Qué Hiciste"	Safe
4	Sandra Pereira	"Ó Gente da Minha Terra"	Safe
5	Adriano Diouf	"Acabou"	Safe
6	Neemias Silva	"Garota de Ipanema"	Safe
7	Carolina Deslandes	"Beggin'"	Safe
8	Martim Vicente	"Lisboa Que Amanhece"	Safe

=== Top 7 (Unforgettable Voices) ===
Order	Contestant	Song	Result
1	Joceline Medina	"Fly Me to the Moon"	Eliminated
2	Neemias Silva	"What a Wonderful World"	Safe
3	Carolina Deslandes	"Canção de Alterne"	Safe
4	Adriano Diouf	"Frágil"	Bottom 2
5	Sandra Pereira	"I Just Want to Make Love to You"	Safe
6	Martim Vicente	"Georgia on My Mind"	Safe
7	Maria Bradshaw	"Smile"	Safe

=== Top 6 (21st Century) ===
Order	Contestant	Song	Result
1	Martim Vicente	"The Scientist"	Safe
2	Neemias Silva	"Walking Away"	Eliminated
3	Sandra Pereira	"Canned Heat"	Safe
4	Maria Bradshaw	"Hurt"	Safe
5	Carolina Deslandes	"Karma"	Bottom 2
6	Adriano Diouf	"Take a Bow"	Safe

=== Top 5 (Viewers' Choice and Judges' Choice) ===
Order	Contestant	Song	Result
1	Adriano Diouf	"I'm Yours"	Safe
2	Carolina Deslandes	"Teenage Dream"	Safe
3	Sandra Pereira	"Sober"	Bottom 2
4	Martim Vicente	"You Found Me"	Safe
5	Maria Bradshaw	"Need You Now"	Saved
6	Adriano Diouf	"Someone Like You"	Safe
7	Carolina Deslandes	"The Blower's Daughter"	Safe
8	Sandra Pereira	"(You Make Me Feel Like) A Natural Woman"	Bottom 2
9	Martim Vicente	"Me and Mrs. Jones"	Safe
10	Maria Bradshaw	"Corazón Partío"	Saved

=== Top 5 (Love Songs & Passion) ===
Order	Contestant	Song	Result
1	Maria Bradshaw	"What´s Love Got to Do With It"	Eliminated
2	Martim Vicente	"Whataya Want From Me"	Bottom 3
3	Carolina Deslandes	"Problema de Expressão"	Safe
4	Sandra Pereira	"Easy Lover"	Safe
5	Adriano Diouf	"One Love"	Eliminated
6	Maria Bradshaw	"What's Love Got to Do with It"	Eliminated
7	Martim Vicente	"Laços"	Bottom 2
8	Carolina Deslandes	"Sex on Fire"	Safe
9	Sandra Pereira	"You'll Follow Me Down"	Safe
10	Adriano Diouf	"Fala-me de Amor"	Eliminated

=== Top 3 (Dedications) ===
Order	Contestant	Song	Result
1	Sandra Pereira	"Encosta-te a Mim"	Safe
2	Martim Vicente	"Man in the Mirror"	Safe
3	Carolina Deslandes	"It's a Man's World"	Eliminated
4	Sandra Pereira	"Shine On You Crazy Diamond"	Safe
5	Martim Vicente	"Deixa-me Rir"	Safe
6	Carolina Deslandes	"I’m Outta Love"	Eliminated
7	Sandra Pereira	"Roxanne"	Safe
8	Martim Vicente	"Porto Sentido"	Safe
9	Carolina Deslandes	"Cara de Anjo Mau"	Eliminated

== Elimination chart ==
Legend
Did Not Perform	Female	Male	Top 13	Top 10	Winner

Safe	Safe First	Safe Last	Eliminated	Judges' Save

Stage:		Semi-Final	Wild Card	Finals								
Week:		11/1		11/7	11/14	11/21	11/28	12/05	12/12	12/19	12/25	1/1
Place	Contestant	Result										
1	Sandra Pereira	Viewers							Bottom 2	Top 2		Winner
2	Martim Vicente	Wild Card	Judges							Bottom 3		Runner-Up
3	Carolina Deslandes	Viewers						Bottom 2		Top 2	Elim	
4-5	Maria Bradshaw	Viewers		Bottom 2					Saved	Elim		
4-5	Adriano Diouf	Viewers			Bottom 2		Bottom 2			Elim		
6	Neemias Silva	Viewers						Elim				
7	Joceline Medina	Viewers				Bottom 2	Elim					
8	Gonçalo Dias	Viewers				Elim						
9	Maria Manuel	Viewers			Elim							
10	Gerson Santos	Viewers		Elim								
Semi	Mónica Ribeiro	Wild Card	Elim									
Semi	Raquel Pinho	Wild Card	Elim									
Semi	Ricardo Costa	Wild Card	Elim									
Semi	Maria Sturkën	Eliminated										

Preceded by Season 3	Ídolos	Succeeded by Season 5
