= Idolos season 3 =

Idolos
- Season 3
- Hosted by: João Manzarra; Cláudia Vieira
- Judges: Manuel Moura dos Santos; Laurent Felipe; Roberta Medina; Pedro Boucherie
- Winner: Filipe Pinto
- Runner-up: Diana Piedade

Release
- Original network: SIC
- Original release: October 4, 2009 – February 14, 2010

Season chronology
- Next → Season 4

The third season of Ídolos premiered on October 4, 2009 on SIC, over four years after the second season finished.

The last show aired on February 14, 2010, with the victory of Filipe Pinto.

== Judges ==
On this season the only remaining judge was Manuel Moura dos Santos. The other three are new to the show.

- Manuel Moura dos Santos - Manager
- Laurent Filipe - Musician
- Roberta Medina - Director of Rock in Rio
- Pedro Boucherie - Director of the cable TV stations of SIC.

== Contestants ==
=== Winner ===
- Filipe Pinto, 21 years old, from São Mamede Infesta (Matosinhos).

=== In order of elimination ===
- Melina Pires 18, from Rio de Mouro - Top 10
- Mariana Tavares 18, from Entroncamento - Top 9
- Catarina Boto 17, from Venda do Pinheiro - Top 8
- Salvador Sobral 19, from Lisbon- Top 7
- Carolina Torres 20, from Maia - Top 6
- Solange Hilário 16, from Matosinhos- Top 5
- Inês Laranjeira 16, from Montijo - Top 5
- Carlos Costa, 17, from Madeira - Top 3
- Diana Piedade 24, from Lagos - Runner-up

=== Semi-finalists (Top 15) ===
- André Cruz, 16, from Amadora
- Diogo Alvarenga 19, from Porto
- Márcio Costa 24, from Lisbon
- Mariline Hortigueira 23, from Cascais
- Marta Silva 23, from Cabeceiras de Basto

== Show ==
=== Top 15 (Idols' Choice) ===
The Top 15 performed live on television on December 6, 2009. In the next day the results were revealed. The five performers with the highest vote from the public were automatically qualified for the finals. Then the jury decided the remaining 5 finalists that completed the Idol's Top 10. (People in bold were eliminated.)

Order	Contestant	Song	Result
1	**André Cruz**	"Somebody To Love"	**Eliminated**
2	Mariline Hortigueira	"Halo"	Wild Card
3	**Márcio Costa**	"Nunca Me Esqueci de Ti"	**Eliminated**
4	Mariana Tavares	"Ironic"	Safe
5	Solange Hilário	"I Wanna Dance With Somebody"	Top 5
6	Catarina Boto	"Right to Be Wrong"	Safe
7	Diana Piedade	"Hedonism"	Safe
8	Carlos Costa	"Hot n Cold"	Top 5
9	**Diogo Alvarenga**	"It's My Life"	**Eliminated**
10	**Marta Silva**	"Fácil de Entender"	**Eliminated**
11	Salvador Sobral	"Sunday Morning"	Top 5
12	Carolina Torres	"Respect"	Safe
13	Melina Pires	"If I Ain't Got You"	Wild Card
14	Filipe Pinto	"High and Dry"	Top 5
15	Inês Laranjeira	"Cheek to Cheek"	Top 5

==== Wild Card ====
Order	Contestant	Song	Result
1	**Mariline Hortigueira**	"Halo"	**Eliminated**
2	Melina Pires	"If I Ain't Got You"	Safe

=== Top 10 (Big Bands) ===
The top 10 performed live on television on December 13, 2009. After all contestants performed the public votes were revealed. Catarina Boto and Melina Pires were the bottom 2 and Melina was eliminated (in bold). From now on the competition the decision to whom was eliminated was entire responsibility of the public.

Order	Contestant	Song	Result
1	Carlos Costa	"You Shook Me All Night Long"	Safe
2	Mariana Tavares	"Every Breath You Take"	Safe
3	Solange Hilário	"The Winner Takes It All"	Safe
4	Carolina Torres	"Feeling Good"	Safe
5	Salvador Sobral	"Crazy Little Thing Called Love"	Safe
6	Inês Laranjeira	"People Are Strange"	Safe
7	**Melina Pires**	"I Want To Know What Love Is"	**Eliminated**
8	Filipe Pinto	"Disarm"	Safe
9	Diana Piedade	"Still Loving You"	Safe
10	Catarina Boto	"Tainted Love"	Bottom 2

=== Top 9 (Dedications) ===
The Top 9 performed live on television on December 20, 2009. The theme was "dedication", so that the contestants could dedicate the chosen song to whatever they wanted. After their performances the voting was revealed. Diana Piedade and Mariana Tavares were the bottom 2 and Mariana was evicted (in bold).

Order	Contestant	Song	Result
1	Inês Laranjeira	"It's Oh So Quiet"	Safe
2	Salvador Sobral	"I'm Your Man"	Safe
3	Solange Hilário	"Gaivota"	Safe
4	**Mariana Tavares**	"How to Save a Life"	**Eliminated**
5	Filipe Pinto	"Times Like These"	Safe
6	Catarina Boto	"Sweet Dreams"	Safe
7	Carlos Costa	"Paparazzi"	Safe
8	Diana Piedade	"Try a Little Tenderness"	Bottom 2
9	Carolina Torres	"Psycho Killer"	Safe

=== Top 8 (Michael Jackson tribute) ===
The top 8 performed live on television on December 27, 2010. In this show the contestants performed song of Michael Jackson's solo career or of the Jackson 5. After all the contestants performed the voting was revealed. Catarina Boto and Carolina Torres were the bottom 2 and Catarina was evicted (bold).

Order	Contestant	Song	Result
1	**Catarina Boto**	"Beat It"	**Eliminated**
2	Salvador Sobral	"Heal the World"	Safe
3	Inês Laranjeira	"Black or White"	Safe
4	Solange Hilário	"Bad"	Safe
5	Carolina Torres	"Earth Song"	Bottom 2
6	Diana Piedade	"Blame It On The Boogie"	Safe
7	Filipe Pinto	"Billie Jean"	Safe
8	Carlos Costa	"You Are Not Alone"	Safe

In between the two shows, SIC organised a special "réveillon" show putting with the Idol's contestants and the remaining crew (hosts, judges,...). There were also special appearances of comedians like Ana Bola, Manuel Marques, etc.

=== Top 7 (Portuguese music) ===
The top 7 performed live on television on January 3, 2010. The theme was Portuguese music, as a result of the constant critics of the contestants choice for songs sung in English. After all the contestants performed the voting was revealed. Salvador Sobral and Solange Hilário were the bottom 2 and Salvador was evicted. The votes were 100% televoting. The person in bold was eliminated.

Order	Contestant	Song	Result
1	**Salvador Sobral**	"Jura"	**Eliminated**
2	Carolina Torres	"Cão Muito Mau"	Safe
3	Filipe Pinto	"Venham Mais Cinco"	Safe
4	Inês Laranjeira	"Deixa-me Rir"	Safe
5	Diana Piedade	"Conta-me Histórias"	Safe
6	Carlos Costa	"Estou Aqui"	Safe
7	Solange Hilário	"Ponto de Luz"	Bottom 2

=== Top 6 (Unmistakable Voices) ===
The top 6 performed live on television on January 9. The theme was Unmistakable Voices. After all the contestants performed the voting was revealed. Carolina Torres and Inês Laranjeira were the bottom 2 and Carolina Torres was evicted. The votes were 100% televoting. The person in bold was eliminated.

Order	Contestant	Song	Result
1	Solange Hilário	"Like a Prayer"	Safe
2	Filipe Pinto	"Valerie"	Safe
3	**Carolina Torres**	"Boys Don't Cry"	**Eliminated**
4	Carlos Costa	"Can't Help Falling In Love"	Safe
5	Diana Piedade	"Piece of My Heart"	Safe
6	Inês Laranjeira	"Big Spender"	Bottom 2

=== Top 5 (Judges choice) ===
The top 5 performed live on television on January 17. The contestants performed two songs. One selected by the judges and another of their choice. After all the contestants performed the voting was revealed. Inês Laranjeira and Solange Hilário were the bottom 2 and Solange Hilário had the lowest votes. However the judges used a power that they had since the 5th gala and that could only be used once and this was the last time they could use it. This way, the judges have the power to save the contestant with the fewest votes, but in the next gala instead of having one evicted contestant there will be two. The votes were 100% televoting. The person in bold received the lowest votes but was saved by the judges.

Order	Contestant	Song	Result
1	Filipe Pinto	"Quero Que Tudo Vá P'ró Inferno"	Safe
2	**Solange Hilário**	"Fame"	**Saved**
3	Inês Laranjeira	"Leve Beijo Triste"	Bottom 2
4	Carlos Costa	"Sopro do Coração"	Safe
5	Diana Piedade	"Live and Let Die"	Safe
6	Filipe Pinto	"With or Without You"	Safe
7	**Solange Hilário**	"Já Sei Namorar"	**Saved**
8	Inês Laranjeira	"Perfect"	Bottom 2
9	Carlos Costa	"Umbrella"	Safe
10	Diana Piedade	"E Depois do Adeus"	Safe

=== Top 5 (Birth Year and 21st Century) ===
The top 5 performed 2 songs each. One of the songs was from the year they were born and another song had to be released in the 21st century. After all the contestants performed the voting was revealed. Carlos Costa, Inês Laranjeira e Solange Hilário were the bottom 3 and Inês Laranjeira and Solange Hilário were evicted. The votes were 100% televoting. The persons in bold were evicted.

Order	Contestant	Song	Result
1	**Solange Hilário**	"Without You"	**Eliminated**
2	Filipe Pinto	"Sweet Child o' Mine"	Safe
3	**Inês Laranjeira**	"Shape of My Heart"	**Eliminated**
4	Diana Piedade	"Dancing in the Street"	Safe
5	Carlos Costa	"One" (not "One Last Time"?)	Bottom 2
6	**Solange Hilário**	"Hush Hush	**Eliminated**
7	Filipe Pinto	"Drive"	Safe
8	**Inês Laranjeira**	"Last Nite"	**Eliminated**
9	Diana Piedade	"Crazy"	Safe
10	Carlos Costa	"Say My Name"	Bottom 2

=== Top 3 (Audience Choice, Idols Choice and 'Enemies' Choice) ===
The top 3 performed 3 songs each. The first one was chosen by one of the fellows, the other by them and, finally, the last one by public. After all the contestants performed the voting was revealed. Filipe Pinto was the first to know that he was one of the finalists and Diana Piedade was the next. Carlos Costa was evicted. The votes were 100% televoting. The person in bold was evicted.

- **Carlos Costa - David Bisbal - Ave Maria (Chosen by Diana)**
- **Carlos Costa - Nelly Furtado - Say it Right (Idols Choice)**
- **Carlos Costa - Michael Bolton - When a Man Loves a Woman (Audience Choice)**
- Diana Piedade - Jacques Brel - Ne me Quitte Pas (Chosen by Filipe)
- Diana Piedade - Tina Turner - Proud Mary (Idols Choice)
- Diana Piedade - Rolling Stones - Satisfaction (Audience Choice)
- Filipe Pinto - Carlos Santana - Smooth (Chosen by Carlos)
- Filipe Pinto - Ornatos Violeta - Ouvi Dizer (Idols Choice)
- Filipe Pinto - Oasis - Don't Look Back in Anger (Audience Choice)

=== Top 2 ===
The top 2 performed 4 songs each. The show was aired live on 7 February 2010. The first one was a duet, the second one was chosen under the theme 'Soundtracks', the other was sung along with Pedro Abrunhosa, a famous Portuguese singer and composer, and, finally, the last one was the song which they wanted to win.

- Diana Piedade and Filipe Pinto - Whitesnake - Here I Go Again
- Diana Piedade - Ray Charles - Hit the Road Jack, from the movie Ray
- Diana Piedade & Pedro Abrunhosa - Momento
- Diana Piedade - Led Zeppelin - Whole Lotta Love
- Filipe Pinto - Goo Goo Dolls - Iris, from the movie City of Angels
- Filipe Pinto & Pedro Abrunhosa - Eu Não Sei Quem Te Perdeu
- Filipe Pinto - Nirvana - Lithium

=== The Big Finale (The Best of Ídolos) ===
The two top finalists performed 2 songs each. The show was aired live on 14 February 2010. As it was Valentine's Day, they sang their best love song ever. After this song, they both sang one of the songs they sang during the auditions. GNR were specially invited to perform during the show.

- Diana Piedade - Jeff Buckley - Lover, You Should've Come Over
- Diana Piedade - Duffy - Mercy
- Filipe Pinto - Bush - Letting The Cables Sleep
- Filipe Pinto - Pearl Jam - Better Man

Beside these performances, ex-contestants also performed:

- All contestants, including Diana Piedade and Filipe Pinto - Coldplay medley - The Scientist/Viva La Vida
- Carlos Costa – Lady Gaga - Paparazzi
- Carolina Torres and Inês Laranjeira – Shirley Bassey - Big Spender
- Melina Pires and Mariana Tavares – The Fray - How to Save a Life
- Solange Hilário and Catarina Boto – Aretha Franklin - Respect

== Elimination chart ==
Female	Male	Wild Card	Top 10	Winner

Not in Danger	Safe	Safe Last	Eliminated

Stages:		Top 15	Wild Card	Finals								
Weeks:		12/06		12/13	12/20	12/27	01/03	01/10	01/17	01/24	01/31	02/14
Place	Contestant	Result										
1	Filipe Pinto	Viewers										Winner
2	Diana Piedade	Judges			Bottom 2							Runner-Up
3	Carlos Costa	Viewers								Bottom 3	Elim	
4-5	Inês Laranjeira	Viewers						Bottom 2	Bottom 2	Elim		
4-5	Solange Hilário	Viewers					Bottom 2		Saved	Elim		
6	Carolina Torres	Judges				Bottom 2		Elim				
7	Salvador Sobral	Viewers					Elim					
8	Catarina Boto	Judges		Bottom 2		Elim						
9	Mariana Tavares	Judges			Elim							
10	Melina Pires	Wild Card	Judges	Elim								
11	Mariline Hortigueira	Wild Card	Elim									
12-15	André Cruz	Elim										
12-15	Diogo Alvarenga	Elim										
12-15	Márcio Costa	Elim										
12-15	Marta Silva	Elim										

== IDOLOMANIA 2010 ==
After the end of the program, a national tour was provided, including all the top 15 contestants, except for Salvador Sobral, who did not accept the offer as he is at university. These are the dates confirmed until the date.

- March 13 - Lisbon (Campo Pequeno)
- March 20- Viseu (Multiusos)
- March 27- Sta Maria da Feira (Europarque)
- April 1- São Miguel (Açores) (Coliseu)
- April 3- Portimão (Arena)
- April 10- Elvas (Coliseu)
- April 17- Guimarães (Multiusos)

== CD ==
After the end of the show, it was also released a CD with the best moments of the top 10 contestants, named Ídolos – Os Melhores Momentos.

- 1.Filipe Pinto - Ouvi Dizer
- 2.Diana Piedade - Piece Of My Heart
- 3.Carlos Costa - Say My Name
- 4.Solange Hilário - I Wanna Dance With Somebody
- 5.Inês Laranjeira - Big Spender
- 6.Catarina Boto - Sweet Dreams
- 7.Mariana Tavares - Ironic
- 8.Carolina Torres - Psycho Killer
- 9.Melina Pires - Son Of a Preacher Man
- 10.Mariline Hortigueira - O Sopro do Coração

== After Idolos ==
=== Mariline Hortigueira ===
After her eviction, Mariline was asked to be the cover of a male magazine, FHM. This became reality in the January 2010 edition.

=== Catarina Boto ===
Catarina became the official voice of the beginning song of the new SIC soap opera, Lua Vermelha, which is a ripoff of the North American bestseller novel by Stephenie Meyer, the Twilight series. The song is a cover of a GNR's song, Morte ao Sol(Death at the Sun).

=== Carolina Torres ===
After eviction, Carolina was offered a job as a presenter in a SIC Radical talk-show, Curto-Circuito, by Pedro Boucherie Mendes, member of the jury and director of the theme TV stations of SIC. She was recently part, of a commercial made by one of the largest supermarkets in Portugal, Jumbo.

=== Salvador Sobral ===
Sobral won the Eurovision Song Contest 2017 with 758 points.

Preceded by Season 2	Ídolos	Succeeded by Season 4
