= Marco Da Silva (dancer) =

Portuguese dancer and choreographer

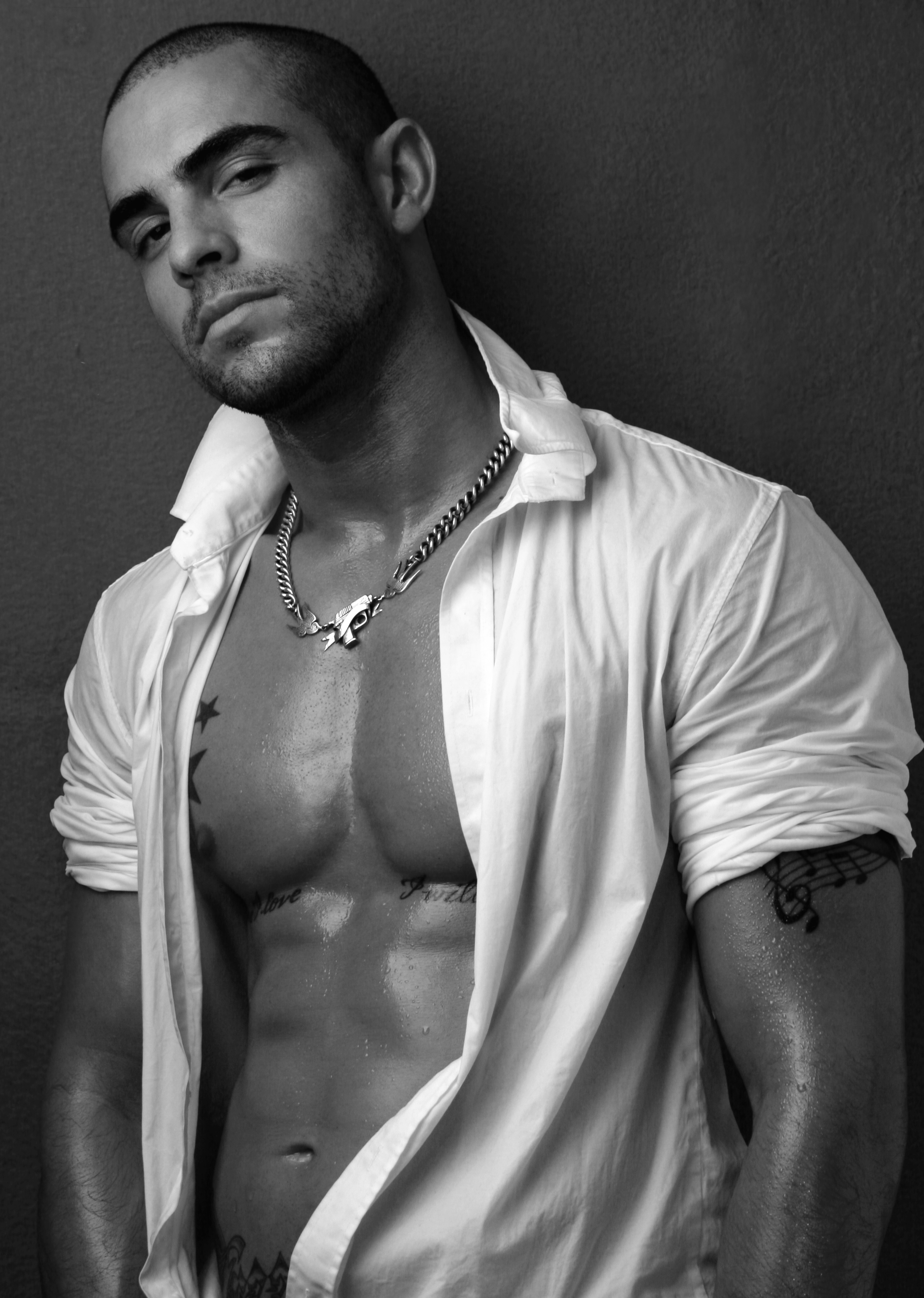
- Born: May 30, 1977 (age 48); Bremen, West Germany
- Occupations: Dancer, Choreographer, DJ
- Years active: 2003-present
- Website: marcodasilva.com

Marco Da Silva (born May 30, 1977), is a Portuguese dancer and choreographer. He was born in Bremen, West Germany in a family of Portuguese descent. His experience as a dancer includes several tours by Kylie Minogue, promotional tours for Minogue's singles ("Wow", In My Arms") and Britney Spears's Femme Fatale Tour. His dancing experience also includes ex-Spice Girl Geri Halliwell, TV commercials for Coca-Cola, films as "The Muppets – The Musical Movie", and music videos such as Kylie Minogue's "All I See", "In My Arms", Mariah Carey's "Thank God I Found You", Erika Jayne's "Pretty Mess", Ninel Conde's "Vivir Asi", and George Michael's "25 Tour".

== Live / Stage performances ==
Da Silva's work as a background dancer which includes four tours by Kylie Minogue. He is featured as a dancer and served as lead music video choreographer for several recording artists.

Tours

- Britney Spears - Femme Fatale Tour (2011)
- Kylie Minogue - For You, for Me (2009)
- Kylie Minogue - KylieX2008 (2008)
- Kylie Minogue - Showgirl: The Homecoming Tour (2006–07)
- Kylie Minogue - Showgirl: The Greatest Hits Tour (2005)
- Jeanette Biedermann - Rock My Life Tour (2003)

Promotional performances

- Kylie Minogue - promotional tours for "Wow" and "In My Arms"
- Geri Halliwell - promotional tour
- Erika Jayne - promotional tour for "Pretty Mess"

== Musicals ==
- Mamma Mia! - Musical - Dancer / Eddie
- West Side Story - Chino

== Music videos ==
- Kylie Minogue - "All I See" - Lead / Choreographer
- Kylie Minogue - "Wow"
- Kylie Minogue - "In My Arms"
- George Micheal - "25 Live" - Screens - Lead
- Ninel Conde - "Vivir así es morir de amor" - Dancer
- Noelia - "Here I Go Again" - Dancer, associate choreographer
- Erika Jayne - "Pretty Mess" - Dancer
- Mariah Carey - "Thank God I Found You" - Extra
- Laura Bell Bundy - "Giddy On Up" - Dancer
- No Angels - "Something About Us", "Feel Good Lies"
- AVA - "Crazy" - Principal dancer
- No Angels - "Feel Good Lies" - Dancer
- No Angels - "Something About Us" - Dancer
- No Angels - "No Angel" - Dancer

== Promotional films / Commercials ==
- Video Music Awards 2011 - Trailer / Dancer for Britney Spears
- US CENSUS Bureau - Principal
- Muppets – The Musical Movie - Dancer
- Coca Cola ad - Lead with Nancy Ajram
