= João Manzarra =

Portuguese television host

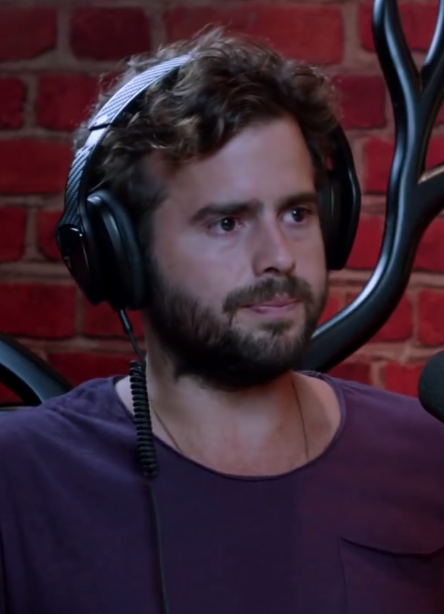
- Manzarra in 2015
- Born: 20 June 1985 (age 41); Lisbon, Portugal
- Occupation: television
- Years active: 2007–present
- Height: 1.73 m (5 ft 8 in)

João Maria Manzarra is a Portuguese television host mainly on the Portuguese SIC Radical network and best known as co-host for the reality television show Ídolos, the Portuguese version of the Idol series for three years and is now one of the most popular presenters on Portuguese television.

== Career ==
Manzarra studied Social Communication at Universidade Católica but had to cut short his studies to host his first major show on television. For two-and-a-half years, he took part in Curto Circuito, a direct call program without prepared scripts becoming a popular presenter. In 2009 he co-hosted SIC ao Vivo with José Figueiras and Liliana Campos followed by co-hosting the show TGV (Todos Gostam do Verão) with Carolina Patrocínio.

From 2009 onwards he has hosted Ídolos, the Portuguese version of the Idol series for three consecutive seasons co-host with Cláudia Vieira making him earn great fame in Portugal due to the popularity of the show. In 2010, he was nominated for the Portuguese Golden Globes award for "Revelation of the Year".

Following his success in Ídolos, he has hosted another popular television series on SIC, namely Achas que Sabes Dançar? the Portuguese version of So You Think You Can Dance series that was launched on SIC in April 2010.

Because of his popularity, he has won commercial endorsements. He is also actively involved in charities.

== Filmography ==
Acting

- 2010: Lua Vermelha (SIC Radical)
- 2011: Yacun (short)

=== TV hosting ===
- 2007/2009: Curto Circuito
- 2009: SIC ao Vivo
- 2009: TGV (Todos Gostam do Verão)
- 2009/2010: Ídolos
- 2010: Achas que Sabes Dançar?
- 2010: Natal de Esperança
- 2010: Parabéns a Você (the 18th anniversary special of SIC)
- 2010/2011: Ídolos
- 2011: Chamar a Música
- 2011: SIC 19 Anos - Parabéns a Você
- 2011: Natal Portugal
- 2012: Ídolos
- 2013: Factor X
