= List of SIC telenovelas =

The following is a chronological list of telenovelas produced by SIC:

== 2000s ==
#	Title	Premiere	Ending	Season(s) / Episodes	Ref.
1	Ganância	March 19, 2001	November 30, 2001	1 season, 154 episodes	—N/a
2	Fúria de Viver	January 7, 2002	September 27, 2002	1 season, 172 episodes	—N/a
3	O Olhar da Serpente	September 28, 2002	April 25, 2003	1 season, 150 episodes	—N/a
4	O Jogo	February 9, 2004	August 4, 2006	1 season, 150 episodes	—N/a
5	Floribella	March 31, 2006	February 1, 2008	2 seasons, 345 episodes	—N/a
6	Jura	September 18, 2006	February 16, 2007	1 season, 107 episodes	—N/a
7	Vingança	February 19, 2007	November 16, 2007	1 season, 234 episodes	—N/a
8	Chiquititas	July 20, 2007	September 5, 2008	1 season, 217 episodes	—N/a
9	Resistirei	November 16, 2007	July 4, 2008	1 season, 197 episodes	—N/a
10	Rebel Way	August 25, 2008	July 16, 2009	1 season, 251 episodes	—N/a
11	Podia Acabar o Mundo	October 1, 2008	July 3, 2009	1 season, 181 episodes	—N/a
12	Perfeito Coração	October 17, 2009	June 11, 2010	1 season, 167 episodes	—N/a

== 2010s ==
#	Title	Premiere	Ending	Season(s) / Episodes	Ref.
13	Blood Ties	September 13, 2010	October 2, 2011	1 season, 322 episodes	—N/a
14	The Fire of the Rose	September 19, 2011	June 30, 2012	1 season, 225 episodes	—N/a
15	Dancin' Days	June 4, 2012	September 27, 2013	1 season, 341 episodes	—N/a
16	Winter Sun	September 16, 2013	September 21, 2014	1 season, 282 episodes	—N/a
17	Salty Sea	September 15, 2014	September 18, 2015	1 season, 317 episodes	—N/a
18	Will for Revenge	May 18, 2015	May 20, 2016	1 season, 296 episodes	—N/a
19	Heart of Gold	September 7, 2015	September 24, 2016	1 season, 326 episodes	—N/a
20	Frozen Memories	May 9, 2016	May 13, 2017	1 season, 304 episodes	—N/a
21	More than Love	September 12, 2016	September 30, 2017	2 seasons, 333 episodes	—N/a
22	Water Mirror	May 1, 2017	April 21, 2018	1 season, 327 episodes	—N/a
23	Living Passion	September 18, 2017	September 24, 2018	2 seasons, 320 episodes	—N/a
24	Tangled Lives	April 9, 2018	May 10, 2019	1 season, 313 episodes	—N/a
25	Heart & Soul	September 17, 2018	October 11, 2019	1 season, 318 episodes	—N/a
26	Nazaré	September 9, 2019	January 8, 2021	2 seasons, 334 episodes	
27	Wild Land	October 28, 2019	March 7, 2021	1 season, 361 episodes	

== 2020s ==
#	Title	Premiere	Ending	Season(s) / Episodes	Ref.
28	Our Love Songs	January 4, 2021	June 5, 2022	2 seasons, 376 episodes	
29	Star Hill	February 22, 2021	April 29, 2022	1 season, 303 episodes	
30	For You	March 7, 2022	March 9, 2023	1 season, 261 episodes	
31	High Note	June 6, 2022	November 28, 2022	2 seasons, 123 episodes	
32	The Secret	September 19, 2022	October 13, 2023	1 season, 283 episodes	
33	Timeless Love	January 30, 2023	March 29, 2024	1 season, 300 episodes	
34	Leading Role	September 25, 2023	October 5, 2024	1 season, 302 episodes	
35	Lady of Tides	February 5, 2024	April 18, 2025	1 season, 312 episodes	
36	Broken Promise	June 18, 2024	October 22, 2025	3 seasons, 352 episodes	
37	The Last Will	January 27, 2025	April 22, 2026	3 seasons, 320 episodes	
38	Vitória	September 22, 2025	October 19, 2026	3 seasons, 278 episodes	
39	Chapters of Life	February 23, 2026	—N/a	3 seasons, TBA episodes	
40	A Greater Destiny	September 14, 2026	—N/a	—N/a	
41	Avenida Portugal	2027	—N/a	—N/a	

== See also ==
- Sociedade Independente de Comunicação
