= Lua de Mel =

- Also known as: Lua de Mel – Temporada Final
- Genre: Telenovela
- Created by: Ana Casaca
- Based on: Amor Amor, by Ana Casaca
- Written by: Rita Roberto; António Barreira; Catarina Pereira Dias; José Pinto Carneiro; Pedro Cavaleiro
- Directed by: Pedro Maria Lebre
- Starring: Jessica Athayde; Fernando Pires; Cláudia Vieira; Carolina Loureiro; Sandra Barata Belo; Luísa Cruz; Filipa Nascimento; Ivo Lucas; Joana Aguiar
- Opening theme: "Juramento eterno de sal" by Álvaro de Luna
- Ending theme: "Juramento eterno de sal" by Álvaro de Luna
- Country of origin: Portugal
- Original language: Portuguese
- No. of seasons: 2
- No. of episodes: 123

Production
- Production locations: SP Televisão studios; Penafiel; Nazaré
- Camera setup: Multi-camera
- Running time: ± 50 min.

Original release
- Network: SIC
- Release: 6 June – 28 November 2022

Related
- Laços de Sangue; Amor Maior; Alma e Coração; Nazaré; Terra Brava; Amor Amor; A Serra

Lua de Mel (English title: High Note) is a Portuguese telenovela produced by SP Televisão and broadcast by SIC. It premiered on 6 June and ended on 18 November 2022. The telenovela is written by Ana Casaca with the collaboration of Rita Roberto, António Barreira, Catarina Pereira Dias, José Pinto Carneiro and Pedro Cavaleiro. It stars Jessica Athayde, Fernando Pires, Cláudia Vieira, Carolina Loureiro, Sandra Barata Belo, Luísa Cruz, Filipa Nascimento, Ivo Lucas and Joana Aguiar.

== Plot ==
The story begins with Nazaré (of Nazaré) being falsely accused of a crime that she did not commit by Verónica. Nazaré becomes a fugitive from the police and, with the help of her friend Toni, gets a fake citizen card. With this, Nazaré becomes a driver for the Portuguese music company High Note, from Amor Amor. Nazaré is forced to send her children to the United States with her husband Duarte to keep them safe until she clears her name.

In jail, Verónica becomes Ângela's cellmate. It is revealed that Ângela sold her younger sister to a Portuguese couple who emigrated to South Africa many years ago.

In an attempt to find out her true parentage, Ângela's apparent long lost sister Lili decides to come to Portugal. When she arrives in Penafiel, she meets Renato França, a singer with a career turned upside down and serious financial difficulties. The chemistry between the two is explosive and they spend the night together. Verónica and Ângela discover that Lili is rich and draw up a plan to take advantage of her money, claiming that Verónica is Ângela's daughter and that Verónica has a terminal illness, to get her to help them be released from jail.

High Note, which actually is in charge of Melanie, Sandra and Valentim Valério, is more than just a music company. Now, it's also a TV channel: VêVê TV, where Valentim Valério takes the opportunity to spread poison. Melanie and Leandro are a successful couple in Portuguese music. Happy as never before, they plan to expand the family, but Melanie has a hard time getting pregnant. This is where Silvie, an old friend from when she lived in Luxembourg, comes into the history. Silvie is delighted with Leandro and offers to be their surrogate. But Mel doesn't have idea the headaches that this idea will bring to her.

Sandra starts dating Zé Pedro, an ambitious guitarist who is with her just for their own advantage. His brother Xavi, who emigrated to England, but who came to spend the summer in Portugal, will truly fall in love with her, which makes him stay for Penafiel, getting work and being the head of the Erva Boa garden center.

Rebeca Sofia, now an abandoned single mother, and queen of Portuguese popular music and one of the singers of VêVê TV, where she has her own program.

Tó Quim left the firefighters once and for all and is about to inaugurate his bar on Luzim River Beach.

== Cast ==
=== Introduced in season 1 ===
==== Main cast ====
- Jessica Athayde as Liliana "Lili" Maia (seasons 1–2)
- Fernando Pires as Renato França (seasons 1–2)
- Cláudia Vieira as Dina Cruz (seasons 1–2)
- Carolina Loureiro as Nazaré Gomes Blanco (Note: This character cames from Nazaré (2019–2021).) (seasons 1–2)
- Sandra Barata Belo as Verónica Andrade Blanco (seasons 1–2)
- Luísa Cruz as Ângela Pinto (Note: This character cames from Amor Amor (2021–2022).) (seasons 1–2)
  - Margarida Baker as Young Ângela (season 1)
- Filipa Nascimento as Melanie "Mel" Sousa Ribeiro (seasons 1–2)
- Ivo Lucas as Leandro Vieira (seasons 1–2)
- Joana Aguiar as Sandra "Sandy" Carina Pinto Pereira (seasons 1–2)

==== Recurring cast ====
- Rodrigo Trindade as José "Zé" Pedro Martins (seasons 1–2)
- Custódia Gallego as Geraldina "Gi" Natércia Coutinho (Note: This character cames from Laços de Sangue (2010–2011).) (seasons 1–2)
- Rui Mendes as Jaime Honrado (seasons 1–2)
- Lídia Franco as Gina Honrado (seasons 1–2)
- Rosa do Canto as Maria de Lurdes Sousa (season 1)
- Miguel Raposo as Augusto Gil Cruz (seasons 1–2)
- Noémia Costa as Maria Prazeres dos Anjos Pinto (Note: This character cames from Terra Brava (2019–2021).) (seasons 1–2)
- Bruna Quintas as Alexandra "Xana" Figueiredo (seasons 1–2)
- Cecília Henriques as Gisela Torres (Note: This character cames from Amor Maior (2016–2017).) (seasons 1–2)
- Lucas Dutra as Cristiano Cruz (seasons 1–2)
- Luciana Abreu as Rebeca Sofia Mendes (seasons 1–2)
- Fernando Rocha as António Joaquim "Tó Quim" (seasons 1–2)
- Oceana Basílio as Palmela "Pammy" Andreia (seasons 1–2)
- João Mota as Xavier "Xavi" Martins (seasons 1–2)
- Heitor Lourenço as Valentim Valério (seasons 1–2)
- Ana Bustorff as Guadalupe Ruiz (seasons 1–2)
- Rui Santos as Pablo Ruiz (seasons 1–2)
- António Camelier as Manuel "Manu" Ruiz (seasons 1–2)
- Sara Norte as Silvie Castanheira (seasons 1–2)
- Francisco Fernandes as Márcio Filipe Mendes (seasons 1–2)

==== Guest characters ====
- Margarida Serrano as Alice Moreira (season 1)
- Rodrigo Costa as José "Zé" Pedro Gomes Blanco (Note: Although the character has a connection with the cast of Nazaré, the character is still written from the zero, which makes him a new character.) (season 1)
- José Mata as Duarte Blanco (season 1)
- Sara Matos as Elsa Santinho (season 1)
- Guilherme Moura as Bernardo Maria Telles Blanco (season 1)
- Afonso Pimentel as António "Toni" Silva (season 1)
- Renato Godinho as Vítor Filipe Mendes (season 1)
- António Fonseca as Raúl Santinho (season 1)

=== Introduced in season 2 ===
==== Recurring cast ====
- Tiago Castro as Renée (season 2)

Guest characters

- Ricardo Pereira as Romeu Santiago (season 2)
- Joana Santos as Linda Sousa (season 2)
- Miguel Costa as Rui Neves (Note: This character cames from Alma e Coração (2018–2019).) (season 2)
- Laura Dutra as Margarida Maria "Guida" Grilo (Note: This character cames from A Serra (2021–2022).) (season 2)

== Production ==
On 19 March 2022, due to commemorations the 30th anniversary of the Portuguese television channel SIC, the telenovela has been confirmed, featuring new characters and also old characters from another telenovelas broadcast by SIC, which is focus on the music company of the telenovela Amor Amor: Lua de Mel (High Note in English). Later, Lua de Mel ended up as the title of the telenovela. In the same year, on 6 April, the first scenes were filmed in SP Televisão studios, Nazaré and Penafiel, and on 29 June, the last scenes were filmed.

== Telenovela overview ==
Phases	Episodes	Originally released	
Phases	Episodes	First released	Last released
1	65	June 6, 2022	September 2, 2022
2	58	September 5, 2022	November 18, 2022

== Ratings ==
Season	Episodes	First aired		Last aired		Avg. viewers (points)
Season	Episodes	Date	Viewers (points)	Date	Viewers (points)	Avg. viewers (points)
1	65	June 6, 2022	10.8	September 2, 2022	7.2	TBD
2	58	September 5, 2022	7.8	November 18, 2022	8.6	TBD

Premiering with the purpose of raising the audiences left of its predecessor in the time slot (Amor Amor - Vol. 2 and Por Ti), Lua de Mel saw one of the worst pilot-episode rating of the first track of telenovelas broadcast by SIC, drawing a rating of 10.8 points and audience share of 22.1%.

Since the second episode, the telenovela began to oscillate between the lead and the vice lead of the audiences and later, ending up losing completely the leader of the audiences. So, due to that and for marketing reasons, the telenovela was divided into two seasons, with the first season finale aired on September 2, 2022, drawing a rating of 7.2 points and audience share of 16.7%. Three days later, on the 5th, the second season aired, titled of ‘Temporada Final’ (Final season in English). Despite having difficulties in imposing itself at the beginning, the second season ended up leading most of the time due to having changed time with the premiere of Sangue Oculto. The second season ended on 28 November 2022, drawing a rating of 8.6 points and audience share of 17.9%.
