= Ana Padrão =

Portuguese actress (born 1967)

- Born: July 4, 1967 (age 58); Lisbon, Portugal
- Occupation: Actress
- Years active: 1988–present

Ana Padrão (born 4 July 1967) is a Portuguese actress.

== Biography ==
Padrão was born on July 4, 1967, in Lisbon. While still a baby, her family moved to Angola, as her father was a soldier and went there on a service commission during the Colonial War.

== Television ==
Year	Project	Role	Broadcast
1988	A Mala de Cartão	Natália	RTP1
1988–1989	Passerelle	Catarina Cardoso	RTP1
1990	Histórias que o Diabo Gosta	Ângela	RTP1
1996	Camilo & Filho Lda.	Alexandra «Xana»	SIC
1997	Ballet Rose	Genoveva	RTP1
1998	Médico de Família	Dra. Sofia	SIC
1999	Residencial Tejo	Marta	SIC
1999	Todo o Tempo do Mundo	Isabel	TVI
2000	Amo-te Teresa	Teresa	SIC
2000	Crianças SOS	Dra. Margarida	TVI
2000	Um Estranho em Casa	Rosário	RTP1
2002	Gente Feliz Com Lágrimas	Marta	RTP1
2004	Inspetor Max	Dina Andrade	TVI
2004	Só Gosto de Ti	Helena	SIC
2004–2006	O Jogo	—N/a	SIC
2005	Diário de Sofia	Ana Carvalho	RTP1
2004–2005	Mistura Fina	Madalena Fraga	TVI
2006–2007	Jura	Ana Leopoldina Teles	SIC
2007	Vingança	Condessa	SIC
2007–2008	Resistirei	Luísa Paiva	SIC
2008–2009	Podia Acabar o Mundo	Luísa Morais	SIC
2009	A Vida Privada de Salazar	Carolina Asseca	SIC
2009	Uma Aventura na Casa Assombrada	Leonor	SIC
2009	Pai à Força	Luísa	RTP1
2010–2011	Espírito Indomável	Beatriz Figueira	TVI
2011	Cuidado com a Língua!	Amiga	RTP1
2011	A Família Mata	Natércia	SIC
2011	Laços de Sangue	Helena	SIC
2011–2012	Rosa Fogo	Amélie Sampaio	SIC
2013	Dancin' Days	—N/a	SIC
2013	Depois do Adeus	Teresa Castro	RTP1
2013–2014	Sol de Inverno	Helena «Lé»	SIC
2015–2016	Coração d'Ouro	Benedita Morgan Castro de Aguiar	SIC
2016–2017	Amor Maior	Laura Resende	SIC
2018	Vidas Opostas	Cecília Candal	SIC
2018	Três Mulheres	Lucienne Abecassis	RTP1
2020	Prisão Domiciliária	Lúcia	OPTO
2021	Doce	Lena d'Água's mother	RTP1
2021–2023	Capitães do Açúcar	Isabel Ramos	RTP1
2022	A Rainha e a Bastarda	Irene	RTP1
2022–2023	Praxx	Beatriz	OPTO
2024	Erro 404	Terapeuta Andreia	RTP1
2024–2025	A Promessa	Helena Fontes Morais	SIC
