= A Herança =

2025 Portuguese telenovela

- English poster for distribution
- Genre: Telenovela
- Created by: Sandra Santos; Alexandre Castro
- Written by: Ana Lúcia Carvalho; Andreia Vicente Martins; Joana Andrade; Manuel Carneiro; Pedro Cavaleiro
- Directed by: Manuel Amaro da Costa
- Starring: Patrícia Tavares; Bárbara Branco; José Mata; Ricardo Pereira; Mariana Monteiro; Dânia Neto; Cristóvão Campos; Laura Dutra; Rui Pedro Silva
- Opening theme: "O Teu Nome" by Miguel Gameiro and Mariza
- Ending theme: "O Teu Nome" by Miguel Gameiro and Mariza
- Country of origin: Portugal
- Original language: Portuguese
- No. of seasons: 3
- No. of episodes: 320

Production
- Production locations: SP Televisão studios; Montargil, Ponte de Sor; Arruda dos Vinhos; Barreiro; Alcochete; Montijo
- Camera setup: Multi-camera
- Running time: ± 50 min.

Original release
- Network: SIC
- Release: 27 January 2025 – 22 April 2026

A Herança (English title: The Last Will) is a Portuguese telenovela produced by SP Televisão and broadcast by SIC. It premiered on 27 January 2025. The telenovela is written by Sandra Santos and Alexandre Castro with the collaboration of Ana Lúcia Carvalho, Andreia Vicente Martins, Joana Andrade, Manuel Carneiro and Pedro Cavaleiro. It stars Patrícia Tavares, Bárbara Branco, José Mata, Ricardo Pereira, Mariana Monteiro, Dânia Neto, Cristóvão Campos, Laura Dutra and Rui Pedro Silva.

== Telenovela overview ==
Season	Episodes	Originally released	
Season	Episodes	First released	Last released
1	110	January 27, 2025	June 27, 2025
2	85	June 30, 2025	October 24, 2025
3	125	October 27, 2025	April 22, 2026

== Plot ==
=== Season 1 (2025) ===
It's possible to start again even after knowing hell. An unexpected inheritance and a crime give a wronged woman the chance to change her life.

Sofia is struggling with serious financial problems and hoping to find her daughter Beatriz, who has been missing for nine years. Her life changes drastically when she meets Raul, a millionaire who turns out to be her father. Raul adds Sofia to his will but is murdered before revealing the truth. Sofia ends up inheriting the Novais family business, but she isn't remotely prepared for the hostility from the Novais family, especially Pilar. Vicente, on the other hand, moves in the shadows to carry out his plan to take control of the company, manipulating Pilar and trying to seduce Sofia. Beatriz, who has just returned, realizes Pilar is plotting against her mother and decides to help Sofia. Hiding her identity, Beatriz becomes her secret ally. But this won't be her only ally. Gonçalo will protect and help her, until he ends up falling in love with her. Little by little, Gonçalo manages to break down the wall that Sofia has built around her heart. But when she decides to give love a chance, she ends up discovering that her daughter Beatriz is also in love with Gonçalo.

Which of them will give up their happiness for the other?

=== Season 2 (2025) ===
Shortly after Vicente and Sofia's wedding, Vicente tries to kill Sofia in a shipwreck, in order to get the factory. To make sure that Beatriz does not inherit it, draw up a plan for her to also board. He claims that he had an unforeseen event and makes you go on the boat with Sofia. What Vicente doesn't expect is that the plan fails and they survive. That event will make the distrust of the villain begin and, later in the story, when he no longer has any influence on Sofia, he will Machiavellianly draw the plan to accuse her of Raul's death, casting suspicions about the day Raul died. Formally accused, she loses everything. Vicente and Pilar will be very pleased to humiliate you and expel you from the factory and the ermate.

When the situation seemed unable to get worse anymore, the discovery arises that Raúl was not killed by the fall caused by Vicente but by a poisoning. The question that persists is: Who killed Raul? And why?

Despite the circumstances, Sofia will not give up on restoring the truth – and will fight until the end to recover the inheritance that belongs to her... and make justice. Even if it's her last will.

== Cast ==
=== Main ===
- Patrícia Tavares as Sofia Carla Dias Martins Novais
  - Tavares also plays Young Sofia and makes a guest appearance as Idalina Dias (season 1), both with the AI feature
- Bárbara Branco as Ana Beatriz Dias Martins / Beatriz Campos
  - Branco also plays Young Ana, with the AI feature
  - Eduarda Baptista as Child Ana
- José Mata as Gonçalo Pereira
- Ricardo Pereira as Vicente Viana
- Mariana Monteiro as Pilar Antónia Almirante Brito Novais
- Dânia Neto as Inês Cardoso
- Cristóvão Campos as Pedro Cardoso
- Laura Dutra as Maria Teresa «Teresinha» Santos (seasons 1-2; guest season 3)
  - Mariana Costa as Young Teresinha
- Rui Pedro Silva as Bernardo Maria Novais Carneiro

=== Recurring ===
- Tiago Felizardo as Simão Carneiro
- Joana Aguiar as Mariana Novais Carneiro
- Diogo Lopes as Rafael de Aragão Brito Novais
- Sofia Sá da Bandeira as Brigida Antónia Almirante Brito Novais
- Noémia Costa as Lucília Sousa
- Fernando Luís as Augusto Pereira
- Ana Bustorff as Amélia Viana (seasons 1-2; guest season 3)
- Pedro Lacerda as Fernando «Nando» Miguel Pinto Sousa
- Débora Monteiro as Susana Barbosa
- Tomás Alves as Heitor Rodrigues
- Isabela Valadeiro as Cláudia Barbosa
- Francisco Froes as Félix Branco
- Rosa do Canto as Gertrudes Cardoso
- Vera Moura as Marta Sousa
- Guilherme Moura as João Carlos «Joca» Sousa
- Sandra Barata Belo as Clara Tavares
- Marisa Cruz as Diana Coelho
- Rui Santos as Mateus Cruz
- Diana Ginja as Filipa «Pipa» Novais
- Vicente Ramirez as Luís Cardoso
- Laura Seiça as Olívia Barbosa
- António Pedro Cerdeira as Otávio Martins (seasons 2-3; guest season 1)
- Beatriz Barosa as Rosário «Rosarinho» Gouveia de Armas (season 2; guest season 1)
- Erica Rodrigues as Amanda Galvão (season 3)
- Rita Bretão as Vera Rodrigo (season 3)

=== Guest stars ===
- Virgílio Castelo as Raúl de Aragão Franco Brito Novais
  - Francisco Fonseca plays Young Raúl
- António Camelier as Marco Rodrigues (season 1)
- Luís Lucas as Artur Coelho (seasons 1-2)
- Mafalda Vilhena as Luísa «Luísinha» Gouveia de Armas (seasons 1-2)
- Philippe Leroux as Ricardo Gouveia de Armas (seasons 1-2)
- Fernando Nobre as Padre Joaquim (season 3)

== Production ==
In March 2024, the pre-production for the telenovela began. Months later, filming began on 14 October, in Montargil, Arruda dos Vinhos and Barreiro. Filming continued later at SP Televisão studios. Laura Dutra finished the recordings before the rest of cast on 30 April 2025. Also Dânia Neto finished the recordings before the rest of the cast, on May 14. Noémia Costa finished the recordings on 24 May. Mariana Monteiro finished the recordings on 30 May. On 6 June 2025 the last scenes were filmed.

== Ratings ==
Season	Episodes	First aired		Last aired		Avg. viewers (points)
Season	Episodes	Date	Viewers (points)	Date	Viewers (points)	Avg. viewers (points)
1	110	January 27, 2025	8.6	June 27, 2025	7.6	7.1 (Note: Based on the audiometric results of the 93 episodes out of 110 broadcast and revealed by GfK.)
2	85	June 30, 2025	7.1	October 24, 2025	7.5	6.8 (Note: Based on the audiometric results of the 78 episodes out of 85 broadcast and revealed by GfK.)
3	125	October 27, 2025	6.5	April 22, 2026	6.8	6.0 (Note: Based on the audiometric results of the 119 episodes out of 125 broadcast and revealed by GfK.)

Premiering with the purpose of keep (and elevate) his predecessor audiences Senhora do Mar (2024), "A Herança" premiered after an episode of A Promessa, drawing a rating of 8.6 points and audience share of 19.3%.

Since the first episode that the telenovela raised the audiences left by Senhora do Mar in the 2nd time slot, breaking audience records and leading against its main competitors A Fazenda (2024) and Festa é Festa (2021), from TVI. With the premiere of his new competitor A Protegida (2025), also from TVI, the telenovela still continued leading the audiences. The final episode of first season also contributed to the good audiometric result of the telenovela. Even though the second season started in the vice-leadership of audiences, maintained the leading audiences and good results against its main competitors. The situation remained with the premiere of the third and last season, even with the premiere of the new competing telenovelas — Terra Forte (2025) and Amor à Prova (2026). The last episode, broadcast on April 22, 2026, leaded the time slot.
