= Espelho d'Água =

Portuguese telenovela

- Starring: Mariana Pacheco; Vítor Silva Costa; Luísa Cruz; (see more)
- Country of origin: Portugal
- Original language: Portuguese
- No. of seasons: 1
- No. of episodes: 327

Original release
- Network: SIC
- Release: 1 May 2017 – 21 April 2018

Related
- Rainha das Flores; Vidas Opostas

Espelho d'Água is a Portuguese telenovela that aired on SIC from 1 May 2017 until 21 April 2018.

== Synopsis ==
Rita feels alone in a hostile world where she doesn't seem to fit in. She was left at a foster care center as a child and only remembers having grown up in institutions, spending a few seasons with families who took her in. Then, at the age of 24, she receives information about her family: her father was killed, and her mother disappeared with a baby brother. In her eagerness to find them and to learn more about her father, she goes to the cod fishing company that once belonged to her family. There, she falls into the hands of the person responsible for her father's death. During her search, she also ends up meeting the love of her life.

== Cast and characters ==
Actor	Character
Mariana Pacheco	Rita Faria
Vítor Silva Costa	António Vidigal
Luísa Cruz	Sara Vidigal
Luciana Abreu	Filipa Nogueira
Cristina Homem de Mello	Luísa Ferreira
Marcantónio Del Carlo	Fernando Montês
Lúcia Moniz	Carmo Goulart
Marina Mota	Sal Silvier
João Ricardo	Mário Pereira
Fernando Inácio	Carlos Damião
Sílvia Filipe	Irmã Madalena
Alexandre de Sousa	Joaquim Goulart
Inês Curado	Clara Baptista
Inês Curado	Raquel Baptista
Amélia Videira	Matilde Falcão
Liliana Santos	Patrícia Lima
Renato Godinho	Tiago Vidigal
Susana Cacela	Sofia Pereira
Pedro Lacerda	Bruno Gomes
Ana Nave	Lucinda Gama
Valéria Carvalho	Renata Pires
José Condessa	Vítor Gama
Marina Mota	Sofia Pereira
António Cordeiro	Horácio Gama
Diogo Martins	Pedro Gomes
Diana Sousa Lara	Cláudia Pereira
Lídia Franco	Isabel Goulart
Carla Chambel	Eunice Gomes
Luís Gaspar	Jaime Rodrigues
Gonçalo Norton	Afonso Goulart
Filipe Vargas	Hélder Gonçalves
António Maria	Francisco Ferreira "Kiko"
Rui Neto	Rafael Almeida
Ricardo Carriço	Nuno Vidigal
Carolina Torres	Inês Reis
João Cabral	Álvaro Faria
Maria Arrais	Elsa Pereira
Diogo Nobre	André Gama
Rui Luís Brás	Zé Paulo
Susana Mendes	Paula
Márcia Leal	Volunteer at SOS shelter
