= Papel Principal =

2023 Portuguese telenovela

- English poster for distribution
- Also known as: Papel Principal – A Vingança (part 2)
- Genre: Telenovela
- Created by: SIC
- Developed by: Ana Casaca
- Written by: Manuel Mora Marques; Pedro Cavaleiro; Pedro Barbosa da Silva; Catarina Dias; Filipa Poppe; Mariana Vicente; João Maria
- Directed by: Jorge Cardoso
- Starring: Carolina Carvalho; Margarida Vila-Nova; Ângelo Rodrigues; José Mata; Mafalda Vilhena; António Fonseca; Victoria Guerra
- Opening theme: "Papel Principal" by Selma Uamusse
- Ending theme: "Papel Principal" by Selma Uamusse
- Country of origin: Portugal
- Original language: Portuguese
- No. of seasons: 1 (2 parts)
- No. of episodes: 302

Production
- Production locations: SP Televisão studios; Oeiras; Lisbon
- Camera setup: Multi-camera
- Running time: ± 45 min. (part 1); ± 15 min. (part 2)

Original release
- Network: SIC
- Release: 25 September 2023 – October 5, 2024

Related
- A Casa da Aurora; Os Eleitos

Papel Principal (English title: Leading Role) is a Portuguese telenovela produced by SP Televisão and broadcast by SIC. It premiered on 25 September 2023 and ended on 5 October 2024. The telenovela is written by Ana Casaca from an original idea of SIC with the collaboration of Manuel Mora Marques, Pedro Cavaleiro, Pedro Barbosa da Silva, Catarina Dias, Filipa Poppe, Mariana Vicente and João Maria. It stars Carolina Carvalho, Margarida Vila-Nova, Ângelo Rodrigues, José Mata, Mafalda Vilhena, António Fonseca and Victoria Guerra.

== Telenovela overview ==
| Parts | Episodes | Originally released | |
| Parts | Episodes | First released | Last released |
|---|---|---|---|
| 1 | 110 | September 19, 2023 | March 1, 2024 |
| 2 | 192 (Note: Of the 192 episodes shown, 98 of them are part of the first division entitled 'A Vingança', which focuses on the main story. The remaining 94 were focused on the second division without any subtitle and focusing on the recurring stories and characters.) | March 4, 2024 | October 5, 2024 |

== Plot ==
Aurora is a young actress who became famous early on and is still widely recognized as one of the most prolific comedy actress working today. Besides the popular teenage series that kick-started her career, she also does musical theatre. But behind the appearance of a headstrong and good natured young woman hides someone who was manipulated by her mother her whole life. Despite having done everything for her daughter to succeed, Irene secretly feels a level of resentment. After all, Aurora has managed to accomplish everything that her mother never could.

Along with her husband Júlio, Irene enrolled Aurora in a casting call for the teenage series “Os Eleitos” (The Medalists in English) but, upon realizing that the final decision was split between her daughter and Lúcia, Irene had no qualms about pulling some strings and swaying the choice for her daughter to get the lead. Lúcia, who grew up in a rough neighbourhood, saw this casting call and the chance to get the lead as her ticked out of her life of hardship. However, Lúcia ended up being run over in a hit and run that nearly took her life.

While recovering in hospital, Lúcia watches as the series becomes a hit, the very series in which she should have been. Instead of her, she sees Aurora in the lead, paired with Fred, the young man who plays the Aurora's best friend and her first love, both in the series and in real life...

== Cast ==
- Carolina Carvalho as Aurora Guerra and Aurora Silva (in fictional series “A Casa da Aurora”)
  - Joana Cravo as Young Aurora
- Margarida Vila-Nova as Lúcia Rocha
  - Ana Lopes as Young Lúcia
- Ângelo Rodrigues as Frederico «Fred» Nascimento
- José Mata as Paulo Peixoto
  - Ivo Arroja as Young Paulo
- Mafalda Vilhena as Irene Guerra
- António Fonseca as Júlio Guerra
- Victoria Guerra as Vera Nascimento
- Renato Godinho as Miguel Castilho and Alexandre «Alex» (in fictional series “A Casa da Aurora”)
- Marco d'Almeida as Ângelo Tavares
- Carolina Loureiro as Gabriela Santos
- Márcia Breia as Fernanda Peixoto
- Melânia Gomes as Daniela Teixeira and Bruna Silva (in fictional series “A Casa da Aurora”)
- Noémia Costa as Matilde Silvestre and Arlete Silva (in fictional series “A Casa da Aurora”)
- Carlos Areia as Gustavo Silvestre
- Sandra Faleiro as Marina Bezerro
- Pedro Lacerda as Joel Bezerro
- Patrícia Tavares as Silvina Castilho
  - Tavares also plays Silvina's pseudonym Henrique Divo
- Diogo Martins as Roberto Baptista and Rui Silva (in fictional series “A Casa da Aurora”)
- Isabela Valadeiro as Inês Freitas
- Miguel Raposo as Manuel Silvestre
- Sofia Arruda as Denise Bezerro
- Igor Regalla as Diego Caseiro
- Vera Moura as Telma «Donatela» Castanheiro
- João Arrais as Zen Bezerro
- Cleia Almeida as Teresa Silvestre
- João Vicente as Pedro Dinis
- Diana Palmerston as Rita Castilho
- Beatriz Forjaz as Alice Teixeira

=== Guest stars ===
- Joaquim Monchique as Marcelo Pimenta

== Production ==
In September 2022, the pre-production for the telenovela began. Almost a year later, the first scenes began to be filmed on 28 June 2023 in SP Televisão studios, in Oeiras at Parque dos Poetas and in on the outskirts of Lisbon. The recordings of the last scenes would be scheduled for March 2024, but due to the bad audiences of the telenovela, it was canceled and had its episodes shortened to less than 150 (minus 50 to 100 episodes than initially planned), with the last scenes being shot on December 21, 2023.

== Ratings ==
| Parts | Episodes | First aired | | Last aired | | Avg. viewers (points) |
| Parts | Episodes | Date | Viewers (points) | Date | Viewers (points) | Avg. viewers (points) |
|---|---|---|---|---|---|---|
| 1 | 110 | September 25, 2023 | 7.5 | March 1, 2024 | 2.6 | TBD |
| 2 | 192 | March 4, 2024 | 5.5 | October 5, 2024 | 2.8 | TBD |

Premiering with the purpose of raising the audiences left from its predecessors in the time slot since the loss of leadership of the audiences Amor Amor - Vol. 2 saw one of the worst pilot-episode rating of the first track of telenovelas broadcast by SIC, drawing a rating of 7.5 points and audience share of 15.5%.

Since the first episode, the telenovela doesn't catch the leadship in the audiences, with some rating and share bad records. Only began to lead the audiences since its 'part 2' after SIC began to broadcast two daily episodes, with Flor sem Tempo being broadcast between the episodes. After the end of Flor sem Tempo, the novela wasn't able to maintain the leadership that had won and began to record several times his worst result ever until the arrival of A Promessa, that boosted their audiences and put it again in the leadership.

In August 2024, when Nazaré (2019) began to be rebroadcast after Senhora do Mar timeslot, Papel Principal episodes began to be broadcast shortly before 1:00AM, with the audiences oscillating between leadership and vice-leadership.

The final episode, aired on October 5, 2024, shown one of the worst audiences ever in a final episode of SIC telenovela since O Olhar da Serpente (2003), scoring 2.8 of rating and 9.8% of share, equivalent to about 270,100 viewers.
