= Mar Salgado =

Portuguese television series

- "A Esperança Nunca Morre" (Portuguese) "Hope Never Dies" (English)
- Written by: Inês Gomes
- Starring: Margarida Vila-Nova; Ricardo Pereira; Joana Santos; José Fidalgo (see more)
- Country of origin: Portugal
- Original language: Portuguese
- No. of episodes: 316

Original release
- Network: SIC
- Release: 15 September 2014 – 18 September 2015

Mar Salgado (Salty Sea) is a Portuguese telenovela which began airing on SIC from September 15, 2014, until September 18, 2015. The series starred Margarida Vila-Nova, Joana Santos, Ricardo Pereira and José Fidalgo, and was written by Inês Gomes.

== Plot ==
Leonor Trigo was only 16 years-old when she fell in love with Gonçalo, a 24-year-old famous motorcycle racer who ends up getting her pregnant with twins. Realizing that Gonçalo will never accept the children, she hides her pregnancy from everyone. When Leonor at the end of her pregnancy, her father, Alberto Trigo, discovers the truth and demands that Gonçalo take responsibility. Gonçalo panics for fear of a lawsuit, with the certainty that a scandal of a relationship with a minor would drive sponsors away and cause him serious problems in the family.

Gonçalo turns to a friend who is a doctor and convinces Patrícia Santos – Leonor's best-friend – to help him. The delivery is made at his friend's clinic, with the help of the doctor's wife, nurse Alice Amorim. Leonor is sedated during childbirth. When she wakes up, they don't tell her she had twins and ensure her that the baby was stillborn. One of the babies (the girl) is handed to Gonçalo's sister – Amélia – who couldn't have children of her own. The other baby (the boy) is left by Patrícia at a church.

Sixteen years later, Leonor Trigo (now 32) works as a diving instructor in the Emirates. She never got over the loss of her baby, so it is a great shock when Alice shows up to tell her the truth about that night. Suddenly all her certainties are shaken as Leonor realizes that she gave birth to two healthy children who are probably still alive. Without thinking twice, she immediately decides to return to Portugal in order to search for her children and get revenge from the people who lied to her.

At present Patrícia Santos (34) is married to Gonçalo Queiroz (39) and the two have a daughter together, “Kika” Queiroz (14). Patrícia took advantage of what she knew to blackmail Gonçalo and force him to marry her. They panic when they realize Leonor is back and knows the truth. They are determined to do everything to silence her and by all mean necessary. On her arrival to Portugal, Leonor also reunites with André Queiroz (34). She was his first crush, who has never truly forgotten her. Leonor comes close to him in order to get more information about her children. Initially, she only intends to use him, but she will eventually fall for him and they will live a beautiful love story.

== Cast ==
- Margarida Vila-Nova - Leonor Fialho Trigo
- Ricardo Pereira - André Cardoso Queiroz
- Joana Santos - Maria Patrícia Santos Queiroz
- José Fidalgo - Gonçalo Cardoso Queiroz
- Inês Aguiar - Carlota Queiroz Vaz
- João Maneira - Tiago Cunha
- António Capelo - Frederico Queiroz
- Custódia Gallego - Antónia Cardoso Queiroz
- Joaquim Horta - Martim Vaz
- Maria João Pinho - Amélia Cardoso Queiroz Vaz
- Inês Castel-Branco - Cristina Maria Santos - «Tina»
- João Ricardo - Bento Correia
- Margarida Carpinteiro - Adelaide Santos
- Sofia Sá da Bandeira - Catarina Cunha
- João Baião - Rogério Manuel Santos
- Maria João Abreu - Cremilde Santos
- Ricardo Carriço - Sebastião Cardoso
- Sandra Barata Belo - Júlia Rocha
- Gonçalo Diniz - João Loureiro - «Joni»
- Rosa do Canto - Laurinda Correia Pelicano
- António Cordeiro - Henrique Pelicano
- António Fonseca - João Pimenta
- Ângela Pinto - Idalina Pimenta
- Bárbara Norton de Matos - Sara Teixeira
- Rúben Gomes - Daniel Lopes
- Liliana Santos - Eva Correia Pelicano
- Luís Barros - Filipe Correia Pelicano
- Sisley Dias - Diogo Fialho Trigo
- Ana Guiomar - Vitória Pimenta
- Manuel Sá Pessoa - Nuno Morais
- Débora Monteiro - Rute Lopes
- Marco Costa - Xavier Rocha
- José Mata - Mateus Correia Pelicano
- Filipa Areosa - Madalena Correia Pelicano
- Hana Sofia Lopes - Camila Noronha
- Tiago Teotónio Pereira - Messias Pimenta
- Diana Nicolau - Sílvia Lopes
- João Arrais - Pedro Pimenta
- Catarina Rebelo - Frederica Santos Queiroz - «Kika»
- Raquel Oliveira - Elsa Rocha
- Afonso Lopes - Hugo Lopes

== Ratings ==
The first episode was watched by 1.4 million viewed with a 29.1% share, the most watched television show of the day. The finale had a viewership of 1.9 million, with an average audience of 19.6% and 42.8% share, the best performing show on the day. The series had an average viewing figure of 1.47 million over 316 episodes, making it the second most-watched telenovela on SIC after Dancin' Days.
