= Lúcia Moniz =

Portuguese singer and actress (born 1976)

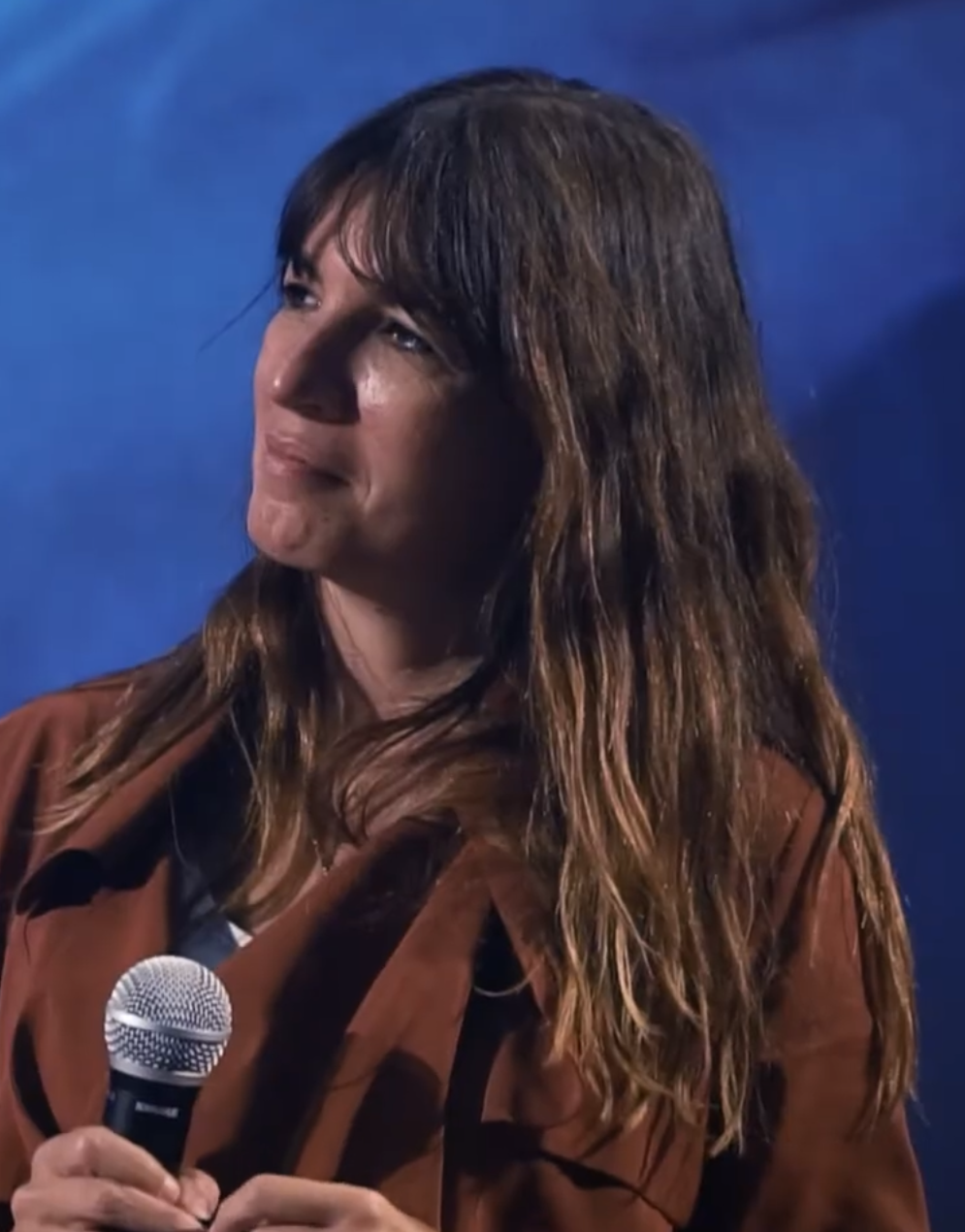
- Moniz in 2020
- Born: Ana Lúcia Pereira Moniz; 9 September 1976 (age 49); Lisbon, Portugal
- Occupations: Singer; actress
- Years active: 1996–present
- Musical career
- Genres: Pop; folk; rock
- Instrument: Vocals

Ana Lúcia Pereira Moniz (born 9 September 1976) is a Portuguese singer and actress. Moniz represented her country in the Eurovision Song Contest 1996 and has released five music albums to date. She has also acted in several television shows, in theatre, and in films, most prominently in the 2003 British ensemble film Love Actually.

== Life and career ==
Ana Lúcia Pereira Moniz was born on 9 September 1976 in Lisbon, Portugal. She is the eldest of two daughters of composer, performer, and conductor Carlos Alberto Moniz, and singer and actress Maria do Amparo. She spent the early years of her life on the Azorian island of Terceira, where both her parents were born, but moved with her family to Lisbon after the archipelago was struck by a serious earthquake in 1980. From the age of 5 or 6 (Note: Moniz is quoted as giving both ages.) to 14, she was a pupil at the Accademia Nazionale di Santa Cecilia, until deciding to pursue a career in the visual arts rather than in music.

In 1993–1994, Moniz attended Eden Prairie High School in Minnesota as an AFS Intercultural Programs exchange student, obtaining her high school diploma. Whilst there, she sang in the school choir and performed in a school production of the musical Kiss Me, Kate.

Moniz was still relatively unknown in Portugal when, at the age of 19, she entered the Festival da Canção with the song "O meu coração não tem cor". (Note: Moniz's father had co-written and performed songs in the 1979, 1981, and 1986 festivals. He also co-wrote the song performed by Helena Isabel at the 1980 event.) Unexpectedly, she reached the final on 7 March 1996, winning by a margin of just four points. She went on to represent her country in the 1996 Eurovision Song Contest, (Note: Moniz progressed to the final in Oslo through a secret, audio-only qualifying round, which was held to reduce the number of finalists from 29 to 22 (not including the host nation, Norway).) where she finished sixth out of 23 contestants. As of 2022, Moniz remains Portugal's second most successful participant, after the country won the competition in 2017.

In 1997, Moniz began acting on TV, as the twins Susana/Bárbara in the soap opera A Grande Aposta. Due to her success, she was cast in another soap, Terra Mãe, which was also successful. She didn't have time to finish her degree in design.

In 1999, Moniz released her first studio album, Magnolia, named after the village near Boston in the United States, where it was recorded. The record includes rhythmic pop songs unlike her Eurovision entry, sung both in Portuguese and English. It reached the top 20 in the Portuguese albums chart and was certified Gold.

Moniz's next album, called 67 as it took this number of days to complete, was released by her record label EMI in April 2002. It was made with her longtime producer, Nuno Bettencourt, and co-produced with multi-instrumentalist Anthony J. Resta.

In 2003, Moniz got her international break when she played the role of Aurélia in the film Love Actually, among a cast that included Colin Firth, Hugh Grant, Alan Rickman, Emma Thompson, Liam Neeson, and Rodrigo Santoro. Her character only speaks Portuguese, while Firth's only speaks English. By the end of the movie, they are in love and engaged.

In 2004, Moniz's daughter with Portuguese musician Donovan Bettencourt, Julia Bettencourt Moniz, was born in the Azores.

Moniz returned to the music scene in 2005, three years after the release of 67, with the album Leva-me p'ra casa ("Take Me Home").

After a six-year gap, Moniz released her fourth album, Fio de Luz (2011). This was followed by Calendário in 2015.

In 2011, the design work for a cookbook undertaken by Moniz received a Gourmand Award, and a book of her photographs, Vou Tentar Falar Sem Dizer Nada, was published two years later.

Moniz reprised her role from Love Actually for Red Nose Day Actually, a short-film sequel that was broadcast on British television in March 2017 to raise money for the charity Comic Relief. In 2021, she won the Best Performance award at the Raindance Film Festival for her role as the struggling mother of a deaf child in the 2020 film Listen.

== Selected filmography ==
=== Film ===
List of film appearances, with year, title, and role shown
Year	Title	Role	Notes
2003	Love Actually	Aurélia	
2014	The Right Juice	Nesta	
2017	Red Nose Day Actually	Aurélia	Short
2020	Fatima	Maria Rosa	
2020	Listen	Bela	
2024	Artificial Justice	Sofía	

=== Television ===
List of television appearances, with year, title, and role shown
Year	Title	Role	Notes
1997–98	A Grande Aposta	Bárbara Gomes / Susana Gomes	150 episodes
1998	Terra Mãe	Ana	146 episodes
2001–01	Ajuste de Contas	Joaninha	150 episodes
2001	Alves dos Reis, um Seu Criado	Henriqueta	3 episodes
2003	Saber Amar	Lúcia Vidal	200 episodes
2006–08	Aqui Não Há Quem Viva	Rute	11 episodes
2007	Vingança	Laura Ramalho	214 episodes
2008–09	Olhos nos Olhos	Cristina Ferreira	186 episodes
2010	Living in Your Car	Carol	13 episodes
2011–13	Maternidade	Madalena Pires	39 episodes
2013	Dancin' Days	Paula	3 episodes
2013–16	Bem-Vindos a Beirais	Susana Fontes	635 episodes
2015–16	Coração d'Ouro	Joana Amaral	326 episodes
2017–18	Espelho d'Água	Carmo Goulart	327 episodes
2019	Solteira e Boa Rapariga	Carla	26 episodes
2020	Na Corda Bamba	Isabel Da Paz	74 episodes

== Discography ==
- Magnólia (1999)
- 67 (2002)
- Leva-me p'ra casa (2005)
- Fio de Luz (2011)
- Calendário (2015)

== Notes ==
Awards and achievements
Preceded by Tó Cruz with "Baunilha e chocolate"	Portugal in the Eurovision Song Contest; 1996	Succeeded by Célia Lawson with "Antes do adeus"
