= Alma e Coração =

Portuguese telenovela

- Starring: Cláudia Vieira; Soraia Chaves; Madalena Almeida; José Fidalgo; Ricardo Pereira (see more)
- Country of origin: Portugal
- Original language: Portuguese
- No. of episodes: 318

Original release
- Network: SIC
- Release: 17 September 2018 – 11 October 2019

Alma e Coração (Heart & Soul) is a Portuguese telenovela which began airing on SIC on September 17, 2018, and ending on October 11, 2019.

== Plot ==
Two mothers and a life of lies, which one would you choose?

Benedita Almeida (Cláudia Vieira) now answers by the name Diana. She had a perfect relationship with her boyfriend André, a skipper who had just proposed to her. At the same time she finds out she is pregnant and is about to break the news to him, she discovers he is transporting women for an illegal prostitution network in Italy. Oblivious to the fact that her grandfather Albano is head of the network, she asks him for help.

He orders her death. She survives and falls into a coma, carrying on with her pregnancy, awakening on the day she goes into labor. She realizes the man who raised her is a monster, so she decides to leave her daughter at the doorsteps of a church and fake their death.

When she disappeared to those who knew her, she came up with a new identity while finding refuge in a traveling circus. She left her home town of Porto and was thought to have died, along with her newborn daughter. At the circus nobody asks questions about her past or the scar on her face and she travels the world with her new “family”.

20 years later, Diana decides to move back to Portugal, confident she has managed to escape her past, finding a job at a performing arts and circus school. Little does she know she is close to coming face to face to what she was running from.

Júlia (Soraia Chaves), who was hospitalized 20 years ago for a heart transplant. The organ she receives belonged to Albano, Diana's grandfather who was an evil man. Julia has always been a kind woman, but her personality changed, ever since she had surgery. The sweet and positive woman gave way to an increasingly bitter person. Her only concern seems to be the daughter she illegally adopted, Victoria (Madalena Almeida).

Victoria is André (Afonso Pimentel) and Diana's daughter. She becomes a girl with an open smile, but with a black soul. Julia created her in her image, turning Victoria into what Albano wanted to transform Diana.

When an evil heart changes your soul.

== Cast ==
Actor/Actress	Characters
Cláudia Vieira	Benedita Almeida/Diana
Soraia Chaves	Júlia Neto
Madalena Almeida	Vitória Neto
José Fidalgo	Rodrigo Macedo
Ricardo Pereira	Gonçalo Oliveira
Afonso Pimentel	André Frois
Dânia Neto	Francisca Frois
Alexandre de Sousa	Fernando Sousa Melo
Rita Lello	Margarida Sousa Melo
Cristóvão Campos	Gustavo Sousa Melo
Victoria Guerra	Marta Sousa Melo
Diana Marquês Guerra	Vera Sousa Melo
Sandra Barata Belo	Cecília Sousa Melo
Carlo Porto	Luís Carvalhais
Ioana Hristova	Leonor Carvalhais
Lucas Dutra	José Maria Frois
Manuel Cavaco	Nestor Macedo
Margarida Carpinteiro	Jacinta Macedo
Manuela Couto	Adelaide Macedo
Renato Godinho	João Macedo
Mariana Pacheco	Carmo Macedo
Cristina Homem de Mello	Eduarda Lopes
Miguel Damião	Flávio Lopes
Diogo Martins	Alexandre "Alex" Lopes
Vítor Silva Costa	Nélson Mendes
Adriano Carvalho	Raimundo Moura
Mafalda Vilhena	Deolinda Moura
João Gadelha	Celso Moura
Sílvia Chiola	Clara Fernandes
Cleonice Malulo	Aida Andrade
Sharam Diniz	Naomi Andrade
Valdemar Brito	Leo Andrade
Rui M. Silva	António Reis
Miguel Costa	Rui Neves
Sinde Filipe	Miguel Arriaga
Marcantónio Del Carlo	Paulo Gomes
