= Remédio Santo =

- Starring: Rita Pereira
- Country of origin: Portugal
- Original language: Portuguese

Original release
- Network: TVI
- Release: May 18, 2011 - September 15, 2012

Related
- Espírito Indomável; Destinos Cruzados

Remédio Santo is a Portuguese telenovela that started airing on TVI on 18 May 2011. It was nominated for an International Emmy Award for best telenovela in 2012.

== Story ==
Do you believe in miracles? Do you believe in the unbelievable? Aurora is not a normal girl. She is a saint and has the ability of curing diseases of people... or at least everyone thinks she has that ability. Aurora's grandmother, Jacinto do Rosário, is opportunist and enjoys every opportunity to make some money, so she makes some potions to cure the problems people have and asks them money in return.

Aurora falls in love with a boy, Gonçalo Monforte, but she can't have a relationship, because she is God's and nobody else. Gonçalo comes from a rich family. Gonçalo's parents, Eugénia Monforte and Daniel Monforte have a factory, but that business is facing a lot of problems and they need help from Álvaro Borges, a Spanish man that is returning to his country. Álvaro lived in Espanha with his family, and curiously his daughter (Helena) is the girlfriend of Gonçalo, who is studying medicine in Espanha with a big friend, Celso. Gonçalo only wanted a night, but then the relationship started evolving and Helena wants to marry him. In a party in Espanha, Gonçalo ends it all and Helena goes crazy, making a scandal. She falls him, she lies saying she is pregnant and now he has to assume his child. Gonçalo wants Aurora but Helena's craziness won't let this love have a happy ending.

Álvaro's wife, Violante Monforte, also returns to Portugal, but she doesn't even know who Álvaro was about to help: Eugénia and Daniel. But Violante, Daniel and Eugénia's story didn't start there. Their story had actually started 30 years before. Daniel and Violante were about to marry, but Daniel flees with Eugénia, leaving Violante alone in the altar. She is humiliated by everyone and only one man tries to help her and takes her to a safe place: Álvaro. Violante and Eugénia were best friends, but the friendship was not true or authentic.

Eugénia is one of the three children of Graça. The others are Hortense and António. António Monforte is a priest and isn't really worried about the family's problems. Hortense Monforte left the family a long time ago. She was expelled by her own mother, because she didn't like the life she had. Hortense had married 3 times until the beginning of the story and all of her past husbands called José, and they were all death. She was called the White Widow. Hortense's son, Sebastião Monforte, has many girlfriends and many relationships but none of them is his future wife. Evangelina (Hortense's best friend) is the woman that will make Sebastião finally fall in love. Evangelina came from a rich family, but they have lost it all and she is desperate to find a way of winning money to live a happier life. But that's not her true story.

There is someone killing people apparently without any reason, and the identity of the serial killer is not known before the last episode. On 15 September Eugénia and Violante unmasks the killer, when he was trying to kill Armando. Evangelina is "the Death". She was getting the revenge from all the people who had been involved in her parents' death.

This story is also a fight between good and evil. Aurora and Zacarias belong to different spirit worlds and Aurora tries to make Zacarias a good person.

A lovely and scary story that makes us doubt about the world around us and mysteries life has in store to us.

== Cast ==
- Rita Pereira - Helena Coelho Borges
- João Catarré - Gonçalo Monforte
- Margarida Marinho - Violante Coelho/Monforte Borges
- Adriano Luz - Armando Ferreira Borges
- Almeno Gonçalves - Daniel Tavares Monforte
- Sílvia Rizzo - Eugénia Monforte
- Sara Barradas - Aurora do Rosário
- Rodrigo Menezes - Renato Coelho
- Paula Lobo Antunes - Sara Margarida Saraiva Trindade
- Marcantónio Del Carlo - António Monforte
- Patrícia Tavares - Evangelina Bettencourt Resende
- Pedro Carvalho - Ângelo Ferreira
- Jorge Corrula - Celso Joaquim Tavares Cardoso
- Rita Loureiro - Maria dos Anjos Muleta Negra
- Julie Sargeant - Maria de Deus Muleta Negra
- Anabela Brígida - Maria de Jesus Muleta Negra
- Sabri Lucas - Edgar Muleta Negra Baldé
- Pedro Caeiro - Sebastião Monforte
- Renato Godinho- Fernando Monfort
- Marta Melro - Amélia Tavares Cardoso
- Lourenço Ortigão - Miguel Coelho Borges
1. Adriano luz gonçalo
- Sara Santos - Clara (Clarinha) Muleta Negra Baldé
- Rui Luís Brás - Vitorino Anselmo
- Ronaldo Bonacchi - Babel
1. rui luis bras jose zé lucio
- Nuno Pardal - Eduardo Sá
1. Jorge silva juiz
- Chantilly (dog) - Himself
1. Jorge silva judge
2. jose carlos pereira
3. candido ferreira
4. joao catarré daniel

== Awards and nominations ==
Year	Award	Category	Result	Ref.
2012	International Emmy Award	Best Telenovela	Nominated	
