= Pedro Carvalho (actor) =

Portuguese film, television, and theater actor

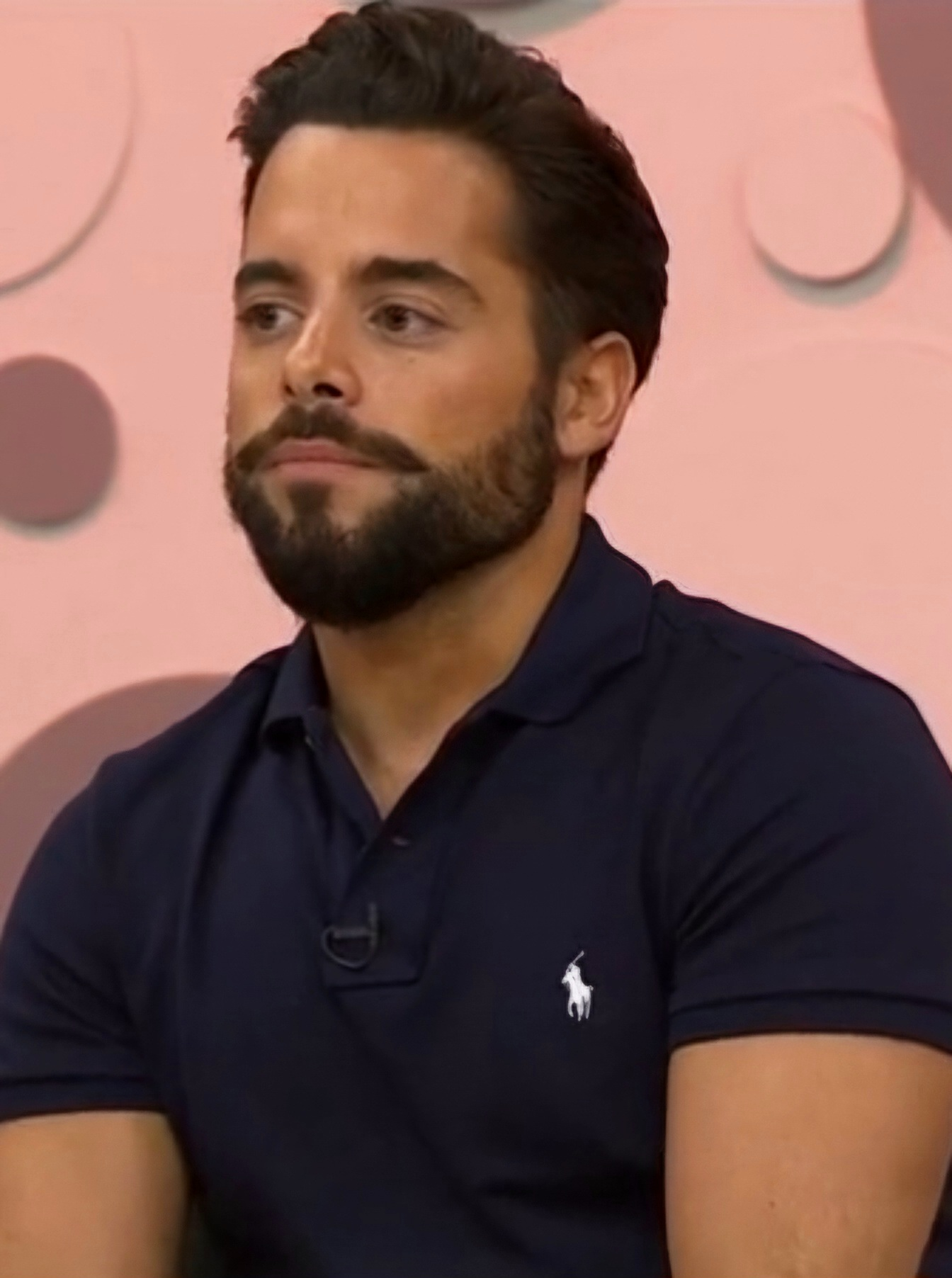
- Carvalho in 2016
- Born: Pedro José Geraldes de Carvalho; July 15, 1985 (age 40); Guarda, Portugal
- Occupation: Actor • Model
- Years active: 2004–present
- Relatives: Filipe Carvalho (twin brother)

Pedro José Geraldes de Carvalho (born July 15, 1985) is a Portuguese actor and model.

== Biography ==
Pedro Carvalho was born in Guarda, Portugal, but grew up in Fundão, where he lived until 17 when he moved to Lisbon to pursue a career as an actor. He finished the professional course of ACT - School of Actors for Cinema and Television in 2007 and since then he has worked in television, cinema and theater.

== Filmography ==
=== Television ===
Year	Title	Role	Notes
2004	Baía das Mulheres	Tiago's friend	Episode: "17 de agosto de 2004"
2005	Mistura Fina	Guga's friend	Episode: "28 de maio de 2005"
2006	O Diário de Sofia	Skater MC	Main cast
2006-07	Morangos com Açúcar	Ricardo Carvalho	Main cast
2007	Tu e Eu	Jonas	Main cast
2008	A Outra	Francisco Gama "Kiko"	Main cast
2008-09	Flor do Mar	Joel Sousa Nicolau	Main cast
2009	37	Jorge	Main cast
2010-11	Mar de Paixão	Alexandre Veloso	Main cast
2011-12	Remédio Santo	Ângelo Ferreira	Co-Protagonist
2012	Morangos com Açúcar – O Filme	Ricardo Carvalho	Main cast
2013	Mundo ao Contrário	Diego	Main cast
2014	O Beijo do Escorpião	Paulo Furtado de Macieira	Main cast
2016	Massa Fresca	Artur Faria "Dr. Artur"	Co-Protagonist
2016-17	Escrava Mãe	Miguel Sales	Main cast
2017	Ouro Verde	Tomás Ferreira da Fonseca	Co-Protagonist
2017-18	O Outro Lado do Paraíso	Amaro Antunes	Main cast
2019	A Dona do Pedaço	Abel da Gama Ferronha	Main cast
2021	Amor Amor	Serafim Amorim	Main cast
2023	Fuzuê	Rui Sodré	Main cast

=== Film ===
Year	Title	Role	Notes
2005	The Chronicles of Narnia: The Lion, the Witch and the Wardrobe	Peter Pevensie	Dubbing
2006	Verão Azul	Paulo	Short film
2007	A Escritora Italiana	Joseph	
2007	Adeus ao Menino, Eu	André	Short film
2008	The Chronicles of Narnia: Prince Caspian	Peter Pevensie	Dubbing
2010	O Dia Mais Longo	Cato	Short film
2010	Catarina e os Outros	Man 4	Short film
2010	The Chronicles of Narnia: The Voyage of the Dawn Treader	Peter Pevensie	Dubbing
2012	Morangos com Açúcar – O Filme	Ricardo Carvalho	
2015	O Diabo Mora Aqui	Apolo	
2016	O Amor é Lindo... Porque Sim!	Dênis	
2016	Portugal Não Está à Venda	Sam	
2022	O Segundo Homem	Rui	

== Stage ==
Year	Title
2006	A Casa do Parque
2007	O principezinho
2008	Um Conto Americano - O Motor, a Água
2013	Isto é Que me Dói
