= Renato Godinho =

Portuguese actor (born 1981)

- Born: 10 July 1981 (age 44); Lisbon, Portugal
- Occupations: Actor and theatre director
- Years active: 1999–present
- Spouse: Patrícia Leitão Godinho (2005-2017)
- Children: 1

Renato Godinho (born 10 July 1981, in Lisbon) is a Portuguese actor and director. He has played roles in Sangue Oculto, Papel Principal, A Promessa, Vidas Opostas and A Casa da Aurora. He also had recurring roles in various series, including Alma e Coração.

== Private life ==
He was married from 2005 to 2017 to Patrícia Leitão Godinho, with whom he has a son.

== Filmography ==
=== Television ===
Year	Project	Role	Notes	Channel
1999	Médico de Família	José «Zé» Maria	Main Cast	SIC
1999	Residencial Tejo		Special Participation	SIC
2000	A Minha Família É uma Animação	Pedro	Main Cast	SIC
2001	Anjo Selvagem	Tozé	Special Participation	TVI
2002	Super Pai	Sebastião	Additional Cast	TVI
2002	Bons Vizinhos		Additional Cast	TVI
2006 - 2007	Tu e Eu	Marco Maravilhas	Main Cast	TVI
2007	Fascínios	João Andrade (Young)	Special Participation	TVI
2007	Deixa-me Amar	Hélder	Additional Cast	TVI
2008	Casos da Vida	Bruno	Cast Main	TVI
2008 - 2009	Feitiço de Amor	João Carlos «Joca» Ferreira	Cast Main	TVI
2009 - 2010	Sentimentos	Victor Correia	Cast Main	TVI
2010 - 2011	Mar de Paixão	Artur	Additional Cast	TVI
2011 - 2012	Remédio Santo	Fernando Monforte/ Coelho	Main Cast	TVI
2012	Anjo Meu	Aristides	Special Participation	TVI
2012	Regra de Três	Pedro	Main Cast	TVI
2014	Bairro	Gusmão	Main Cast	TVI
2014	O Beijo do Escorpião	Manuel Ventura	Main Cast	TVI
2014 - 2015	Jardins Proibidos	Inspetor Nuno Galvão	Main Cast	TVI
2015	A Única Mulher	Asdrúbal	Additional Cast	TVI
2015 - 2016	Coração d'Ouro	Nuno	Additional Cast	SIC
2017 - 2018	Espelho d'Água	Tiago Vidigal	The-Antagonist	SIC
2018	Vidas Opostas	Marco Vaz	Antagonist	SIC
2018 - 2019	Alma e Coração	João Macedo	Main Cast	SIC
2019 - 2021	Terra Brava	Tiago Branco/ Salvador Montenegro Bastos	Antagonist	SIC
2021 - 2022	Amor Amor	Vítor Mendes	Main Cast	SIC
2021	Estamos em Casa	Himself	Presenter	SIC
2021	Na Porta ao Lado: Medo	Bruno	Protagonist (OPTO)	SIC
2022	Lua de Mel	Vítor Mendes	Guest Starring in Amor Amor	SIC
2022 - 2023	Sangue Oculto	Guilherme Mesquita	Supporting actor	SIC
2023	Vale Tudo season 4	Himself	Fixed Cast	SIC
2023	Ao Largo	André	Protagonist	RTP1
2023	O Clube season 4	Marques	Main Cast (OPTO)	SIC
2023 - 2024	Papel Principal	Miguel Castilho	Main Cast	SIC
2023	A Casa da Aurora	Miguel Castilho, in the role of Alexandre «Alex»	Main Cast	SIC
2023 - 2024	Na Realidade é Ficção	Himself	Interviewer (OPTO)	SIC
2024	O Clube season 5	Marques	Main Cast (OPTO)	SIC
2024	Vale Tudo Especial	Himself		SIC
2024 - 2025	A Promessa	Bruno Cardoso	Main Cast	SIC
2025	O Amor é a Razão	Himself	Presenter (podcast)	
2025	Adonis	Miguel	Protagonist	RTP1
2026	Páginas da Vida	Gabriel Vilaça	Main cast	SIC
