= Sol de Inverno =

- Written by: Pedro Lopes
- Starring: Maria João Luís; Rita Blanco; Rogério Samora; Inês Castel-Branco; Ângelo Rodrigues; Pedro Sousa; Joana Ribeiro; Victória Guerra; Diogo Morgado; Cláudia Vieira
- Country of origin: Portugal
- Original language: Portuguese

Original release
- Network: SIC
- Release: 16 September 2013 – 21 September 2014

Sol de Inverno (Winter Sun) is a Portuguese telenovela which aired on SIC in September 2013 – September 2014.

== Cast ==
- Maria João Luís - Laura Teles de Aragão
- Rita Blanco - Sofia Ferreira Bívar
- Rogério Samora - Manuel Gusmão
- Vitória Guerra - Matilde Bívar
- Pedro Sousa - Salvador Teles de Aragão
- Inês Castel-Branco - Teresa Teles de Aragão
- Diogo Morgado - Eduardo Teles de Aragão
- Cláudia Vieira - Andreia Teles de Aragão
- Ângelo Rodrigues - Simão Teles de Aragão
- Joana Ribeiro - Margarida Teles de Aragão
- João Perry - Adelino Ferreira
- Maria Emília Correia - Lurdes Fonseca
- Ana Marta Ferreira - Concha Vasconcelos
- Jorge Corrula - Tomás
- Teresa Macedo - Joana Ferreira
- Márcia Breia - Dulce Sousa
- Rui Unas - Carlos Miguel Sousa
- Luciana Abreu - Fátima Cardoso de Jesus
- João Ricardo - Acácio Cardoso de Jesus
- Diana Chaves - Lúcia Raposo
- Fátima Belo - Beatriz Ferreira
- Rui Morisson - Lourenço Branco Teles
- Dânia Neto - Benedita Lage
- Ana Nave - Isabel Lage
- Sandra Barata Belo - Rita Taborda
- Cleia Almeida - Célia Barata
- João Baptista - Fábio Pacheco
- Lia Gama - Rosa Mendes
- Alexandre de Sousa - Horácio Mendes
- Andreia Dinis - Ana Mendes
- Rui Neto - Nuno Mendes
- Duarte Soares - Artur Fonseca
- Júlio César - Jacinto Fonseca
- Francisco Côrte-Real - Vicente Pereira
- Ana Padrão - Lé Vasconcelos
- Filipe Vargas - Mariano Alvarenga
- Marco Delgado - Luís da Cunha
- Bárbara Lourenço - Inês Galego
- Leonor Beleza - Alice Tavares
- Francisco Monteiro - Vasco Gusmão
- Benedita Cardoso - Violeta Pereira
- Miguel Ruivo - Matias Pereira

== Plot ==
Sofia Ferreira Bívar, 51 years old, and her husband, Alvaro Bívar, are partners of Laura Teles de Aragon, 53 years old, and her husband Francisco, in a company that owns the BOHEME. The couples have a great friendship, working as a team, optimistic about the future of the company. They expand their brand worldwide. This harmony, however, comes to an end when Sofia and her husband are accused of stealing company money and are forced to flee the country to avoid being arrested. Laura is never related to the case, but she's the one who forges the evidence, implicating her partners, after being convinced Sofia had an affair with her husband, who dies in a water ski accident. The circumstances of what happened lead Laura to access her husband’s inbox, where she discovers multiple e-mails to Sofia, in which Francisco confesses his love for her. Laura knows that Sofia and Francisco dated when they were young, so when she sees the emails, she comes to think they were lovers, despite the fact Sofia never gave in to her ex’s approaches. Unable to overcome the jealousy and anger, she decides to fulfill a relentless punishment: contrary to the wishes of the children, she turns off the machine that connects Francisco to life and ruins Sofia’s life.

Caught unaware by accusations of fraud and on the verge of being arrested, Sofia and Álvaro find themselves forced to flee to Mozambique, where Alvaro lived during his childhood and still has many friends, leaving there family behind. In Africa, they will reconstruct their life from scratch. Sofia was always good with business, getting a Mozambican partner and opening a bakery that will grow, transforming into a chain of stores and distribution. Her husband can’t take the pressure and commits suicide. When she is finally cleared of the crime of which he was accused, she returns to Portugal to recover what she lost and what was taken away from her…with interest! The war against Laura, her former associate, is declared. The clash between these two women is about to start.

In a primarily female plot there are a handful of great women. Loaded with flaws and mistakes from the past without taking account of means of consequences, they do whatever it takes to achieve what they want. However, at the climax, there will only be room for remorse, for forgiveness and for justice.
