= Cadences obstinées =

- Directed by: Fanny Ardant
- Written by: Fanny Ardant
- Produced by: Paulo Branco
- Starring: Asia Argento; Nuno Lopes; Gérard Depardieu; Franco Nero; Ricardo Pereira
- Release dates: 17 November 2013 (Lisbon & Estoril Film Festival); 27 March 2014 (Portugal)
- Running time: 96 minutes
- Countries: France; Portugal
- Box office: $31,125

Cadences obstinées (Portuguese: Cadências Obstinadas) is a 2013 French-Portuguese romance film directed by Fanny Ardant.

== Cast ==
- Asia Argento as Margo
- Nuno Lopes as Furio
- Franco Nero as Carmine
- Tudor Istodor as Gabriel
- Ricardo Pereira as Mattia
- Johan Leysen as Wladimir
- Gérard Depardieu as Father Villedieu
- Mika as Lucio
- Laura Soveral as Carmine's mother

== Reception ==
In Público's Ípsilon, Luís Miguel Oliveira gave the film a rating of "mediocre" and Jorge Mourinha gave it a rating of "bad".
