= Senhora do Mar =

- English poster for distribution
- Genre: Telenovela
- Created by: João Matos; Raquel Palermo
- Written by: João Matos; Raquel Palermo; Ana Leiria Martins; Joana Ligeiro Oliveira; Patrícia Castanheira; Sofia Bairrão
- Directed by: Manuel Amaro da Costa
- Starring: Sofia Ribeiro; Afonso Pimentel; Júlia Palha; João Jesus; João Reis; Vera Kolodzig; Ana Marta Ferreira; Pedro Hossi
- Opening theme: "Senhora do mar (Negras águas)" by Vânia Fernandes
- Ending theme: "Senhora do mar (Negras águas)" by Vânia Fernandes
- Country of origin: Portugal
- Original language: Portuguese
- No. of seasons: 1 (2 parts)
- No. of episodes: 312

Production
- Production locations: SP Televisão studios; Terceira Island, Azores; Lisbon
- Camera setup: Multi-camera
- Running time: ± 50 min.

Original release
- Network: SIC
- Release: 5 February 2024 – April 18, 2025

Senhora do Mar (English title: Lady of Tides) is a Portuguese telenovela produced by SP Televisão and broadcast by SIC. It premiered on 5 February 2024 and ended on 18 April 2025. The telenovela is written by João Matos and Raquel Palermo with the collaboration of Ana Leiria Martins, Joana Ligeiro Oliveira, Patrícia Castanheira and Sofia Bairrão. It stars Sofia Ribeiro, Afonso Pimentel, Júlia Palha, João Jesus, João Reis, Vera Kolodzig, Ana Marta Ferreira and Pedro Hossi.

== Telenovela overview ==
Parts	Episodes	Originally released	
Parts	Episodes	First released	Last released
1	100	February 4, 2024	June 21, 2024
2	212	June 24, 2024	April 18, 2025

== Plot ==
Azores, Terceira Island... A woman lies on the black sand of the beach at dusk. She looks dead. In the town of São Mateus, right next door, it's time for introspection and pilgrimages. But the pilgrimage is suddenly interrupted. A child has gone missing: Chico, the miracle baby, Flávia's son, whom everyone adores. The atmosphere is one of consternation. Nobody knows about him. The men gather to look for him. The women pray to the Holy Spirit. There are fears that he has fallen down a cliff. That he has died at sea. The women quickly turn on Anabela, the girl who was supposed to be looking after Chico.

The woman on the beach is Joana, who has come in from the sea, tired and struggling for life. She has just turned 36, a few days before, and discovered that she is pregnant. This news, which would be a blessing for a woman who really wants to be a mother, has become a problem. Alexandre, her husband, is egoistic, controlling and sometimes violent. The fact that he is unemployed has made matters worse.

Recent times have been scary. It will be difficult to convince him that this is a good time to bring a child into the world... The worst thing is that Alex finds out about the pregnancy and reacts very badly. He seems to go mad, threatens Joana and pulls a gun on her. And Joana runs away, in the middle of the night, with no bag, no phone and no money.

In desperation, she hides on a sailboat, but ends up falling asleep. She wakes up hours later in the open sea. The owners of the boat are not to be trusted and Joana realizes that she has run away from one threat only to fall into another, even bigger one. Near Terceira, she thinks they're going to kill her and throws herself off the boat. She wakes up on the beach with Chico petting her. When she arrives in the village with the child on her lap, she is welcomed like a saint. The legend of the Lady of Tides is born.

== Cast ==
=== Main ===
- Sofia Ribeiro as Joana Gonçalves Pedrosa/Natália Rodrigues (known also as Senhora do Mar)
- Afonso Pimentel as Manuel Bettencourt (part 1; guest part 2)
  - Manuel Nabais as Young Manuel/Leo
- Júlia Palha as Maria Silva Castro
  - Palha also plays Rosa Silva, Maria's mother
- João Jesus as Pedro Lobo Bettencourt
  - TBA as Young Pedro
- João Reis as Artur Bettencourt
  - João Maneira as Young Artur
- Vera Kolodzig as Paula Soares
- Ana Marta Ferreira as Susana Cordeiro
- Pedro Hossi as Alexandre «Alex» Borges

=== Recurring ===
- Albano Jerónimo as Padre Filipe Pinheiro
- Cláudia Vieira as Francisca Medeiros (Bettencourt)
- Maria João Pinho as Leonor Pires
  - TBA as Young Leonor
- Marcantonio Del Carlo as Alberto Melo
  - Francisco Fernandez as Young Alberto
- Anabela Moreira as Márcia Guedes
- Graciano Dias as Óscar Ramos
  - Henrique Mello as Young Óscar
- Mariana Pacheco as Flávia Assunção
- Hélder Agapito as Jesus Costa
- Manuela Couto as Luísa Cordeiro
- Zeca Medeiros as Abel Silva
- Tomás Alves as Jaime Cordeiro
  - Martim Balsa as Young Jaime
- Ana Varela as Teresa Vilar
  - Carolina Lobato as Young Teresa/Cleo
- Vítor Silva Costa as Michael Machado
- Ana Lopes as Lurdes Pires
- Ivo Alexandre as José «Zé» Batista
- Inês Pires Tavares as Rita Bettencourt
- Duarte Gomes as Ricardo Medeiros
- Inês Sá Frias as Carla Guedes
  - Luísa Bacalhau as Young Carla
- Beatriz Godinho as Beatriz Melo
- Ivo Arroja as Renato Melo
- Rodrigo Trindade as Robert Machado
- Hélder Afonso as David Monteiro
- Francisca Salgado as Anabela Guedes
- Rita Loureiro as Maria Madalena Lobo Bettencourt
- Romeu Costa as Sérgio Pires
- Diogo Fernandes as Rafael Vilar
- Luís Lourenço as Rúben Semião
- Inês Curado as Vanessa Santos

=== Guest stars ===
- Marina Mota as Judite Gonçalves
- Rita Blanco as Genoveva Ramalho
- Virgílio Castelo as Adérito Ramalho
- Marta Faial as Liliana Mendes (guest part 1; additional part 2)
- Jorge Paupério as Jaime Augusto Cordeiro (guest part 1; additional part 2)
- Margarida Cardeal as Cláudia Antunes
- Patrícia André as Sara Vilar (guest part 1; additional part 2)
- Diogo Lopes as Samuel Correia
- Guilherme Filipe as Padre Ramiro (part 2)

== Production ==
In 2023, the pre-production for the telenovela began. Months later, the first scenes began to be filmed on 27 November 2023 in Terceira Island, Azores, and later on SP Televisão studios and on the outskirts of Lisbon. On 28 June 2024 the last scenes were filmed.

== Ratings ==
Parts	Episodes	First aired		Last aired		Avg. viewers (points)
Parts	Episodes	Date	Viewers (points)	Date	Viewers (points)	Avg. viewers (points)
1	100	5 February 2024	8.4	June 21, 2024	6.8	6.1 (Note: Based on the audiometric results of the 248 episodes in 312 transmitted and revealed by GFK.)
2	212	24 June 2024	6.7	April 18, 2025	6.6	6.1

Premiering with the purpose of raising the audiences left with Amor Amor - Vol. 2, Senhora do Mar saw one of the worst pilot-episode rating of the first track of telenovelas broadcast by SIC, drawing a rating of 8.4 points and audience share of 16.4%. Still, it managed to raise the audience left by Papel Principal and Flor sem Tempo.

Since the first episode, the telenovela begins to show some leadship in the audiences, although not be every day. After the premiere of A Promessa, and also coinciding with the arrival of part 2 of the telenovela, it became the leader of the audiences. Until the final episode, on 18 April 2025, it continued its upward trajectory, leading against its main competitor.
