= João Catarré =

Portuguese actor and model

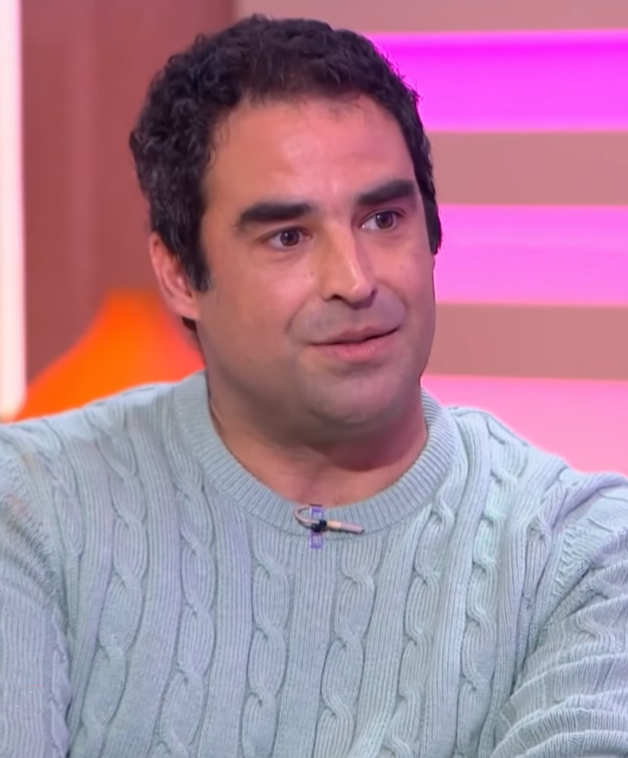
- Catarré in 2024
- Born: 5 August 1980 (age 45); Lisbon, Portugal
- Occupations: Actor, model
- Height: 1.84 m (6 ft 0 in)

João Ricardo Rosa Catarré (born 5 August 1980) is a Portuguese actor and model. He has been a constant presence on Portuguese TV screens since 2003.

== Biography ==
Born 5 August 1980, Catarré waconsidered one of the most promising young Portuguese actors in the 2000s. In 1999, he worked as a professionalized model while studying IT Management at the Lusophone University. He was the face of numerous advertising campaigns for television, and later decided to pursue "showbiz" professionally. Catarré took classes for actors (in television production) during this time.

His first acting job was a protagonist role in the first series of Sweet Strawberries – intended for a juvenile audience -, where he played the character Pipo, in 2003 and 2004. Besides Portugal, the series was broadcast in Romania, Syria and Brazil.This role was essential was essential for Catarré's rise. Catarré continued to act in television, commercials, and feature films; he also worked as a voice actor of animated characters, such as the famous superhero dog Bolt. Catarré, as it is known among his friends, still has natural aptitude for the sport, having joined the volleyball team of Sport Lisboa e Benfica. He also participated in various competitions of beach volleyball.

== Television ==
- Protagonist, Miguel Soares Fontes Morais in A Promessa
- Protagonist, Tiago Carvalho in Sangue Oculto
- Protagonist, Rodrigo Bastos/Diogo Moreira in Terra Brava
- Recurring, Luis Fernandes in Amor Amor
- Recurring, Ramiro Neves in A Única Mulher
- Protagonist, José Belmonte in Belmonte
- Protagonist, David Campelo in Doida Por Ti
- Protagonist, Gonçalo Monforte in Remédio Santo
- Protagonist, João Monteiro Castro in Espírito Indomável
- Protagonist, Pedro in Deixa Que Te Leve
- Main Cast, Bernardo in Feitiço De Amor
- Special Participation, Olavo's Partner in Liberdade 21
- Main Cast, Camacho in Vila Faia
- Host with Patrícia Candoso on the show Destinos.pt
- Main Cast, Pedro Moura in Mundo Meu
- Additional Cast, Pipo in Morangos com Açúcar II
- Protagonist, Pipo in Morangos com Açúcar I
- Main Cast, Rodrigo Bastos/Diogo Moreira in Terra Brava
