= Ricardo Pereira (actor) =

Portuguese actor, model, and TV presenter

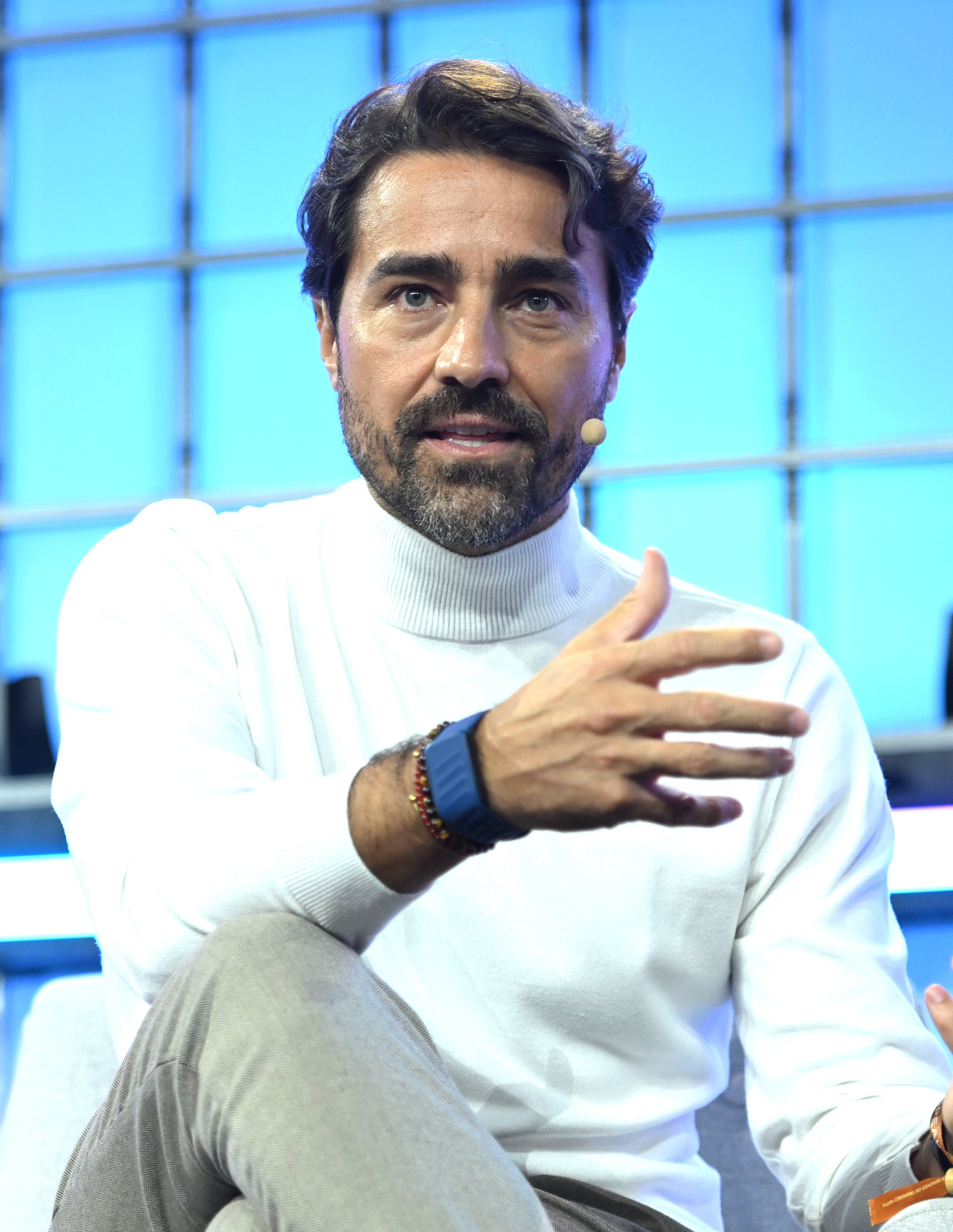
- Pereira in 2025
- Born: Ricardo da Silva Tavares Pereira; 14 September 1979 (age 47); Lisbon, Portugal
- Occupation: Actor
- Years active: 2000–present
- Height: 1.85 m (6 ft 1 in)
- Spouse: Francisca Pinto Ribeiro (m. 2010)
- Children: 3

Ricardo da Silva Tavares Pereira (born 14 September 1979) is a Portuguese actor, model and television presenter.

== Biography ==
Ricardo Pereira was born in Lisbon, Portugal. He spent most of his youth in Sintra Municipality and studied for a degree in psychology at the Lusófona University.

== Career ==
Pereira has worked in many projects, ranging from theatre, to television, to cinema. He launched his career in the year 2001 with the play A Real Calçada ao Sol, to which he followed the movie Um Homem não é um Gato.

He reached stardom in Portugal in 2002, with television projects such as Saber Amar and Bairro da Fonte. In 2004, he became the first non-Brazilian protagonist in a Rede Globo soap-opera. With a signed contract with the Brazilian broadcaster Rede Globo Ricardo Pereira bought a house in Rio de Janeiro, where he moved to with his family. Since then he has integrated the casts of various Rede Globo productions, starring in Como uma Onda and Aquele Beijo, to name a few.

Despite the busy schedule, the actor has continued to work in theatre and cinema. In 2012/2013 he played the lead male role in the play Um Sonho para Dois and, also in 2013, he had a role in the French film Cadences obstinées, directed by Fanny Ardant.

Ricardo Pereira has done some work as a TV presenter as well, both in Portugal and Brazil, namely hosting Episódio Especial (SIC) and Dança na Galera (Domingão do Faustão, Rede Globo). Furthermore, he has been the face of various advertising campaigns in both countries, publicising banks, supermarkets, entertainment chain-stores and other companies.

After the end of Joia Rara (Rede Globo), he temporarily moved back to Lisbon to take part in a SIC production entitled Mar Salgado, which premiered in 2014.

Ricardo has integrated the cast of two projects which have won the International Emmy Award in the Best Soap Opera category: Laços de Sangue (SIC) and Joia Rara (Rede Globo)

The actor is represented by L'Agence in Portugal and by 2Twogether in Brazil.

== Personal life ==
Ricardo Pereira married Francisca Ramalho Perestrelo Pinto Ribeiro in July 2010. The ceremony took place in Igreja da Nossa Senhora da Assunção, in Elvas, and had the attendance of around 400 guests. The couple has three children. A boy named Vicente, born in November 2011, a girl named Francisca, born in October 2013, and the youngest called Julieta. All children were born in Rio de Janeiro, where they were living at the time, and have dual citizenship.

In July 2022, his wife proposed to remarry him on top of the statue Christ the Redeemer in Rio de Janeiro.

== Filmography ==
=== Television ===
Year	Title	Character	Producer	Ref.
2001	Maiores de 20		RTP1	
2001	A Senhora das Águas	Gil Vargas das Neves	RTP1	
2002	Amanhecer	Rui Costa	TVI	
2002	O Bairro da Fonte	Gonçalo	SIC	
2002	Sonhos Traídos	João	TVI	
2002	A Minha Sogra é uma Bruxa	Leopoldo	RTP1	
2003	Queridas Feras	Pedro Maia	TVI	
2003	Saber Amar	João Vidal	TVI	
2004	Inspector Max		TVI	
2004	Como uma Onda	Daniel Cascaes	Rede Globo	
2005	Prova de Amor	Marco Aurélio/ Marco Antônio (Toni)	Rede Record	
2005	O Diário de Sofia	Francesco	RTP2	
2006	Jura	Paulo Almeida	SIC	
2006	Exclusivo SIC	Presenter	SIC	
2006	Pé na Jaca	Thierry	Rede Globo	
2007	Floribella (Portugal)	Conde Máximo	SIC	
2008	Negócio da China	João	Rede Globo	
2008	Podia Acabar o Mundo	Nuno	SIC	
2009	Perfeito Coração	Pedro Cardoso	SIC	
2009	Dança dos Famosos 6	himself	Rede Globo	
2009	Toma Lá, Dá Cá	Alexandre (Xandinho)	Rede Globo	
2009	Episódio Especial	Presenter	SIC	
2010	Laços de Sangue	Hélio	SIC	
2010	Lua Vermelha	Vasco Galvão	SIC	
2010	A Vida Alheia	Rafael Régis	Rede Globo	
2011	Insensato Coração	Henrique Taborda	Rede Globo	
2011	Aquele Beijo	Vicente Santelmo	Rede Globo	
2012	Dancin' Days	Salvador Neto	SIC	
2014	Mar Salgado	André Queiroz	SIC	
2015	A Regra do Jogo	Faustini	Rede Globo	
2016	Liberdade, Liberdade	Tolentino	Rede Globo	
2017	Novo Mundo	Ferdinando	Rede Globo	
2018	Deus Salve o Rei	Virgílio	Rede Globo	
2018	Alma e Coração	Gonçalo Oliveira	SIC	
2019	Éramos Seis	Almeida	Rede Globo	
2021	Amor Amor	Romeu	SIC	
2022	Cara e Coragem	Danilo Bosco	Rede Globo	
2026	Coração Acelerado	Jean Carlos Garcia	Rede Globo	

=== Film ===
Year	Title	Character	Director / Producer
2001	Um Homem não é um Gato	Miguel	Marie Brand / SIC
2002	Sem Ela		Anna de Palma
2002	Os Imortais	TV reporter	António-Pedro Vasconcelos
2003	The Miracle According to Salomé	Gabriel	Mário Barroso
2005	Sonhos e Desejos	Roco	Marcelo Santiago / Belo Horizonte
2005	O Crime do Padre Amaro	Gustavo	Carlos Coelho da Silva
2005	Até Onde		Carlos Barros
2005	Viúva Rica Solteira Não Fica	Adriano	José Fonseca da Costa
2006	Cecile (short)		
2006	Nadine	António	Filbox (Holland)
2007	What If the World Would be a Trustworthy Friend		Short – Rita Fernandes
2007	Até Onde Podes Ir (short)		Faculdade de Comunicação de Coimbra/ISCT
2008	So Much More than Fun (short)		Rita Fernandes
2008	O Apelo (short)		Vanessa Silva / Universidade Moderna
2008	Amália	Eduardo Ricciardi	Carlos Coelho da Silva / Valentim de Carvalho
2008	Second Life		Miguel Gaudencio / Utopia Filmes
2009	Uma Professora Muito Maluquinha		Cesinha e André Vilas Lobos
2009	Uma Aventura na Casa Assombrada		Carlos Coelho da Silva / Valentim de Carvalho
2009	Mysteries of Lisbon	Alberto de Magalhães	Raúl Ruiz
2013	Cadences obstinées	Mattia	Fanny Ardant
2013	Lisboa Vista do Rio (documentary)		Ivan Dias
2013	Turbo (voice dubbing)		DreamWorks
2013	Os Caras de Pau		Marcius Melhem Case Filmes
2013	In Search of Ingrid	Mauro Sposito	
2014/2015	Cosmos	Tolo	Andrzej Zulawski / Alfama Films
2015	Meu Passado Me Condena 2	Álvaro	Júlia Rezende
2015	Amor Impossível	Marco	António-Pedro Vasconcelos
2016	Letters from War	Major M	Ivo Ferreira
2024	Os Papéis do Inglês	.	Sérgio Graciano

=== Stage ===
Year	Title	Director	Theatre
2000	A Real Calçada ao Sol	Carlos Avilez	T. Nacional D. Maria II
2000	O Sítio do Picapau Amarelo (readings)		
2001	Os Meus Primeiros Poemas		
2002	A Menina que Procurava o Sol	Rita Alagão	Auditório Carlos Paredes
2002	Menino ao Colo	Maria Emília Correia	T. Trindade / Teatro São João (Sobral)
2003	No Natal	Bruno Cochá	Convento do Beato
2004	Tá-se	Luis Esparteiro	Teatro da Luz
2005	Surto		Teatro dos Quatro (Rio de Janeiro)
2005	Por uma Noite	António Pires	Teatro Estefânia / T. Rivoli
2008	A Gorda – Fat Pig	Amandio Pinheiro	Teatro Villaret
2010	A Paixão de Cristo	Cesar Augusto Felix Crispiano	Teatro Cidade Cenográfica (Brazil)
2012	Um Sonho para Dois	Michel Bercovitch	Teatro Villaret / Teatro Leblon (Rio de Janeiro)

=== As a Presenter ===
Year	Title	Producer / Broadcaster
2006	Mandou Bem	Multishow (Brasil)
	GNT "Um Dia Com"	Rede Globo
	Programa Exclusivo	SIC
2008 / present	Episódio Especial	SIC
2013	Dança da Galera	Rede Globo
2010–2014	Red Carpet – Golden Globes	SIC
