= Joana Ribeiro =

Portuguese actress

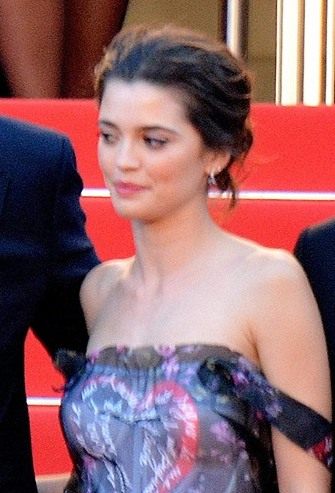
- Ribeiro in 2018
- Born: Joana Isabel de Alvim Rodrigo Pereira Ribeiro; 25 March 1992 (age 34); Lisbon, Portugal
- Occupations: Actress and model

Joana Isabel de Alvim Rodrigo Pereira Ribeiro (born 25 March 1992) is a Portuguese actress.

== Early life ==
Joana Ribeiro was born on 25 March 1992 in Lisbon, Portugal to an engineer father and veterinarian mother. She studied first at the Luís Madureira School in Alfragide, and then completed secondary studies in Lisbon. Ribeiro initially studied architecture, but changed her focus to acting.

== Career ==
Ribeiro signed with an agency, Lisbon Elite, and played in the short film Herança do Silêncio (Silent Inheritance).

Ribeiro's breakout role was as Mariana Côrte-Real in the telenovela Dancin' Days for SIC. Her next role was in another SIC telenovela, Sol de Inverno (Winter Sun). She was cast as Susan Delgado in Amazon Prime Video's cancelled 2020 The Dark Tower series.

Internationally, she's acted in The Man Who Killed Don Quixote (2018) by Terry Gilliam, Fatima (2020) by Marco Pontecorvo (in which she played Our Lady of Fátima), Infinite by Antoine Fuqua (2021) and The Man Who Fell to Earth by Alex Kurtzman and Jenny Lumet (2022).

She was one of the ten "Shooting Stars" at the Berlin Film Festival in 2020.

== Selected filmography ==
=== Film ===
Year	Title	Role	Notes
2018	The Man Who Killed Don Quixote	Angélica Fernández	
2018	The Black Book of Father Dinis	Charlotte Corday	
2020	Fatima	Virgin Mary	
2021	Infinite	Leona	
2021	Nightride	Sofia	
2022	A Sibila	Germana	
2025	Maria Vitória		
2026	Clayface	Mia Torrez	

=== Television ===
Year	Title	Role	Notes
2012–13	Dancin' Days	Mariana Corte-Real	
2013–14	Sol de Inverno	Margarida	
2015–16	Poderosas	Luísa Nogueira	
2017	Madre Paula	Madre Paula	
2017–18	Paixão	Ana Rita Sobral	
2018–19	A Teia	Diana Figueiredo	
2019–20	Prisioneira	Teresa Cunha	
2021	Glória	Ursula	Recurring cast
2022	The Man Who Fell to Earth	Lisa Dominguez	
2022	Das Boot	Inês de Pina	
2024	The Veil	Sandrina	
2024–25	A Promessa	Verónica Rocha Morais	
