= A Promessa (2024 TV series) =

- English poster for distribution
- Genre: Telenovela
- Created by: Inês Gomes; Cândida Ribeiro
- Based on: Zalim İstanbul by Aysun Erdogan, Seda Cakir Avunduk & Ozlem Tasagal Yakici
- Written by: Inês Gomes; Cândida Ribeiro; Ana Casaca; Ana Vasques; Filipa Poppe; José Carneiro; Manuel Mora Marques
- Directed by: Jorge Queiroga
- Starring: João Catarré; Victoria Guerra; Joana Ribeiro; Lourenço Ortigão; Sofia Alves; Ana Padrão; José Wallenstein; Soraia Chaves; Pepê Rapazote; Joana Santos
- Opening theme: "Eterno" by Os Anjos
- Ending theme: "Eterno" by Os Anjos
- Country of origin: Portugal
- Original language: Portuguese
- No. of seasons: 3

Production
- Production locations: SP Televisão studios; Sintra; Trás-os-Montes
- Camera setup: Multi-camera
- Running time: ± 50 min.

Original release
- Network: SIC
- Release: June 18, 2024 – October 22, 2025

A Promessa (English title: Broken Promise) is a Portuguese telenovela produced by SP Televisão and broadcast by SIC. It premiered on 18 June 2024 ended on 22 October 2025. The telenovela is written by Inês Gomes and Cândida Ribeiro with the collaboration of Ana Casaca, Ana Vasques, Filipa Poppe, José Carneiro and Manuel Mora Marques. It stars João Catarré, Victoria Guerra, Joana Ribeiro, Lourenço Ortigão, Sofia Alves, Ana Padrão and José Wallenstein. Soraia Chaves, Pepê Rapazote and Joana Santos joined the cast in second season.

== Telenovela overview ==
| Season | Episodes | Originally released | |
| Season | Episodes | First released | Last released |
|---|---|---|---|
| 1 | 113 | June 18, 2024 | November 15, 2024 |
| 2 | 141 | November 18, 2024 | June 6, 2025 |
| 3 | 98 | June 9, 2025 | October 22, 2025 |

== Plot ==
Helena is a former secretary of António Fontes Morais's who cunningly married her boss, thus earning the title of a trophy wife. Together, they had two children: Tomás and Camila. Their firstborn is a playboy who has been living in the United States and Camila is a spoiled young woman who spends her days spending money and on her phone. The family enjoys a lavish lifestyle, but António doesn't go without a driver and armed security since his brother Fausto was murdered, leaving his son Miguel under the care of his aunt and uncle.

Helena's hatred for the Rocha family has grown as much as the cousins Tomás and Miguel, who is stuck to a wheelchair, love Laura. So, without realizing, the nurse sees herself in the middle of a love triangle that will undermine the harmony between the Fontes Morais and Rocha families. Still, Verónica, who is totally in love with Tomás, and Helena will resort to any means necessary to get rid of Laura.

== Cast ==
=== Main ===
- João Catarré as Miguel Soares Fontes Morais
  - Salvador Pires as Young Miguel
- Victoria Guerra as Laura Rocha (Fontes Morais)
- Joana Ribeiro as Verónica Rocha (Fontes Morais)
- Lourenço Ortigão as Tomás Fontes Morais
  - Vicente Ramirez as Young Tomás
- Sofia Alves as Maria Rocha
- José Wallenstein as António Fontes Morais (season 1–2; guest season 3)
  - Wallenstein also plays Young António, with the AI feature
- Ana Padrão as Helena Pimenta/Fontes Morais
  - Padrão also plays Young Helena, with the AI feature
- Soraia Chaves as Cátia Ferreira/Olga Sousa (season 2–3)
- Pepê Rapazote as Luís Alberto Martins Rocha (season 2–3)
- Joana Santos as Bianca Oliveira Trindade (season 2–3)

=== Recurring ===
- Custódia Gallego as Lurdes Martins Rocha
- Diogo Martins as Nuno Rocha
- Paula Magalhães as Camila Fontes Morais
- Renato Godinho as Bruno Cardoso
- Luísa Cruz as Soraia Oliveira Pimenta
- Adriano Luz as Joaquim «Quim» Pimenta
- Bruna Quintas as Raquel Castanheiro Candeias
- Ivo Lucas as Ronaldo Oliveira Pimenta
- Rita Ribeiro as Isaura Oliveira Trindade
- Luís Esparteiro as Rogério Candeias
- Carla Andrino as Elsa Castanheiro (Candeias)
- Tiago Aldeia as Nelson Pacheco
- Joana Pais de Brito as Sónia Casemiro Guedes/Trindade
- Diana Marquês Guerra as Isabel Castanheiro Candeias
- Jorge Corrula as Xavier Gouveia
- Rui Unas as Samuel Pedro Oliveira Trindade
- Paula Lobo Antunes as Maria do Carmo «Micá» Sarmento
- Pedro Carmo as Duarte Sarmento
- Filipa Nascimento as Leonor Sarmento
- Santiago André as João Tiago Casemiro Guedes
- Leonor Felgar as Diana Cardoso (season 2–3)

== Production ==
In late 2023, the pre-production for the telenovela began. In 2024, filming began on 8 April in Vilarinho de Negrões and Trás-os-Montes. Filming continued on 17 April at SP Televisão studios and on the outskirts of Sintra and Lisbon. Soraia Chaves joined the recordings on 8 July 2024 and Joana Santos on 12 August 2024, coinciding with the beginning of the second season recordings. Also, had recordings on September–October 2024 in Belmonte and Castelo Branco. José Wallenstein finished the recordings on 8 November 2024, coinciding with the beginning of the final season recordings. Pedro Carmo also finished recordings on 20 November. On 4 December 2024 the last scenes were filmed.

== Ratings ==
| Season | Episodes | First aired | | Last aired | | Avg. viewers (points) |
| Season | Episodes | Date | Viewers (points) | Date | Viewers (points) | Avg. viewers (points) |
|---|---|---|---|---|---|---|
| 1 | 113 | June 18, 2024 | 13.4 | November 15, 2024 | 8.1 | TBD |
| 2 | 141 | November 18, 2024 | 8.7 | June 6, 2025 | 7.2 | TBD |
| 3 | TBA | June 9, 2025 | 8.4 | TBA | TBD | TBD |

Premiering with the purpose of returning the lead of audiences left with Amor Amor - Vol. 2 and also to raise the values of its predecessor Papel Principal (2023), A Promessa saw one of the best pilot-episode rating broadcast by SIC since A Serra (2021), drawing a rating of 13.4 points and audience share of 27.0%, leading the audiences.

Since the first episode that the telenovela raised the audiences left by Papel Principal and Senhora do Mar (2024) when they passed the time slot and alternated the leadership with the main competitor Cacau (2024), from TVI, until it began to lead frequently after the premiere of the second season, coinciding between the final episodes of Cacau and the debut of its new main competitor A Fazenda (2024), also from TVI.
