= Flor sem Tempo =

- English poster for distribution
- Genre: Telenovela
- Created by: Inês Gomes
- Written by: Cândida Ribeiro; Rita Roberto; Ana Casaca; Ana Vasques; José Pinto Carneiro; Manuel Carneiro
- Directed by: Jorge Queiroga
- Starring: Bárbara Branco; Francisco Froes; Albano Jerónimo; Maria João Bastos; Joana Santos; Luís Esparteiro; Cristina Homem de Mello; José Wallenstein
- Opening theme: "Flor Sem Tempo" by Bárbara Branco
- Ending theme: "Flor Sem Tempo" by Bárbara Branco
- Composers: José Sottomayor; José Calvário
- Country of origin: Portugal
- Original language: Portuguese
- No. of episodes: 200

Production
- Production locations: SP Televisão studios; Azeitão; Lisbon; Cascais
- Camera setup: Multi-camera
- Running time: ± 50 min.

Original release
- Network: SIC
- Release: 30 January 2023 – 30 March 2024

Flor sem Tempo (English title: Timeless Love) is a Portuguese telenovela produced by SP Televisão and broadcast by SIC. It premiered on 30 January 2023 and ended on 30 March 2024. The telenovela is written by Inês Gomes with the collaboration of Cândida Ribeiro, Rita Roberto, Ana Casaca, Ana Vasques, José Pinto Carneiro e Manuel Carneiro. It stars Bárbara Branco, Francisco Froes, Albano Jerónimo, Maria João Bastos, Joana Santos, Luís Esparteiro, Cristina Homem de Mello and José Wallenstein.

== Plot ==
The Torres are wine producers and the most powerful family in Vila Santa. The patriarch Fernando, born in the village, is known by all as a fair and benevolent man, .

Each of the Torres' heirs aspires to be Fernando's successor, but he trusts no one except his grandson Vasco, the only one who stays out of the family wars and who has been traveling the world. Now the patriarch feels he needs to prepare his succession and asks Vasco to come home. Caetana, Vasco's sister, is the one who feels most threatened and will do anything to get to power and keep her brother out of the way.

Meanwhile, when Vasco returns to Vila Santa, he runs into Catarina Valente, the daughter of the maid who mysteriously disappeared from the Torres' farm. Just out of jail, Catarina demands to know what happened to her mother. The police rule out a murder and claim that Leonor has decided to leave her job and her family. But Jorge Valente, Catarina's father, is convinced that his wife is dead and blames Torres' family. To find out the truth, Catarina moves to Vila Santa and infiltrates the Torres' farm to investigate. This is how Catarina falls in love with Vasco, but it's hard to ignore that he's part of the family that "stole" her mother.

Catarina's family, on the other hand, is a real troublemaker. The Valente's are broke, living off scams and petty theft, with Catarina trying to keep them from committing crimes and getting caught up in the trouble they get into. While she tries to get the family on track, to raise and protect her younger sister, her father is always getting into trouble.

The story will focus on the love between Catarina and Vasco, the search for Leonor, the Valente family’s troubles and the secrets and wars of Torres, a family in which everyone fights and betrays each other in order to have more power.

A story about love, justice, and fight for power.

== Cast ==
- Bárbara Branco as Catarina Valente
- Francisco Froes as Vasco Vaz Torres
- Albano Jerónimo as Jorge Valente
- Maria João Bastos as Leonor Valente
- Joana Santos as Caetana Vaz Torres
- Luís Esparteiro as Eduardo Vaz
- Cristina Homem de Mello as Vitória Torres
- José Wallenstein as Luís Maria Soares
- Marina Mota as Julieta Formiga
- Fernando Luís as Teodoro Mosquito
- Luísa Cruz as Cremilde Mosquito
- Rui Morisson as Fernando Torres
- Custódia Gallego as Elisa Mosquito
- João Lagarto as Belmiro Fontes
- Gonçalo Diniz as António Formiga
- Sandra Barata Belo as Rosa Santos
- Jorge Corrula as Ricardo Soares Torres
- Débora Monteiro as Diana Sousa
- Vítor Silva Costa as David Sousa
- Dânia Neto as Mariana Campos
- Diogo Amaral as Sebastião Soares Torres
- Bruna Quintas as Miquelina «Mimi» Mosquito
- Diogo Valsassina as Jaime Fontes
- Joana Aguiar as Filipa Fontes
- João Maneira as António José «Tozé» Valente
- Bia Wong as Cláudia Santos
- Luís Ganito as Gabriel Mosquito
- Mariana Cardoso as Vera Valente
- Lara Chelinho as Marta Valente
- Ricardo Mata Ribeiro as Salvador Tourais Torres
- Francisco Valente as Lourenço Tourais Torres

=== Guest cast ===
- Rita Blanco as Natália Sousa
- Alexandra Lencastre as Madalena Torres
- Rita Ribeiro as Graça Barata

== Production ==
In 2021, the pre-production for the telenovela began. One year later, the first scenes began to be filmed in 14 November 2022 in SP Televisão studios and also later in Azeitão and on the outskirts of Lisbon, like Cascais, that serve to give life to the fictional village Vila Santa, and Palmela in Hotel Casa Palmela, that serves to give life to the Torres family mansion. Also, in May 2023 there were as well recordings in Gondomar. Albano Jerónimo ended up recording yours last scenes on 6 March 2023, just like Sandra Barata Belo ended up on 18 May and Maria João Bastos ended up on 16 June. The remaining cast finished the work on 6 July.

== Ratings ==
Season	Episodes	First aired		Last aired		Avg. viewers (points)
Season	Episodes	Date	Viewers (points)	Date	Viewers (points)	Avg. viewers (points)
1	300	30 January 2023	10.5	29 March 2024	4.9	TBD

Premiering with the purpose of raising the audiences left with Amor Amor - Vol. 2, Flor Sem Tempo saw one of the worst pilot-episode rating of the first track of telenovelas broadcast by SIC, drawing a rating of 10.5 points and audience share of 21.4%.

Since the first episode, the telenovela begins to show some leadship in the audiences, although not be every day.
