= Márcia Leal =

Portuguese actress (born 1980)

- Born: February 8, 1980 (age 45); Portugal

Márcia Leal (born February 8, 1980) is a Portuguese actress. A fixture in telenovelas and TV series, she was part of the cast of productions such as "A Minha Família é Uma Animação" (2000), "Anjo Selvagem" (2001/02), "Maré Alta" (2004), "Ninguem Como Tu" (2005) and "Fala-me de Amor" (2006).
