= Vidas Opostas (TV series) =

Portuguese telenovela

- "Unidas Pelo Destino" (Portuguese) "United by Destiny" (English)
- Starring: Joana Santos; Sara Matos; Diogo Amaral; João Jesus (see more)
- Country of origin: Portugal
- Original language: Portuguese

Original release
- Network: SIC
- Release: 9 April 2018 – 10 May 2019

Related
- Espelho d'Água; Terra Brava

Vidas Opostas (Tangled Lives) is a Portuguese telenovela which began airing on SIC on 9 April 2018 and ended on 10 May 2019.

== Plot ==
Life is good to EVA. She loves husband MARCO, has a job that makes her feel fulfilled and is pregnant with her first child. Little does she know her World is about to crumble!

EVA finds out MARCO has been cheating on her and that their marriage is a front with even more unpredictable consequences. MARCO is in fact in love with MARIA. They have maintained a relationship for over two years and have a baby daughter.

MARCO works for a big sports fashion entrepreneur, ÁLVARO, who also set up an illegal doping network. He worked for the network. Reason why he married EVA, so he can spy on her, pass on secret intelligence and operations to the network, since she worked for an anti-doping agency.

When MARCO finds himself responsible for the death of ÁLVARO's son, an up-and-coming football star, he becomes a wanted man! His former boss will want nothing but to kill him. ÁLVARO must be careful, so no one discovers his illegal business.

JORGE is a journalist who will return from Canada to investigate his brother MARCO's secret life. He will fall in love with ex-sister-in-law EVA and discover he has a niece, building a relationship with MARIA.

On the other hand, ÁLVARO's son RICARDO will also try to discover who killed his brother, which leads him to MARIA. He will fall deeply in love with her once he realizes she was never MARCO's accomplice. But MARIA will have to prove her innocence to his family.

This is how EVA and MARIA will confront each other. Their lives will be forever tangled through the man who fooled them. They will fight to the end against MARCO, to regain their life and protect their families.

== Cast ==
Actor/Actress	Characters
Joana Santos	Eva Lemos
Sara Matos	Maria Pinho
Renato Godinho	Marco Vaz
Diogo Amaral	Jorge Vaz
João Jesus	Ricardo Candal
Maria João Luís	Salomé Lemos
Ana Padrão	Cecília Candal
Paula Lobo Antunes	Aurora Teles
Rui Morrison	Álvaro Candal
Diana Chaves	Vera Leal
Jorge Corrula	Lucas Teles
Martinho Silva	Caio Leal
Sofia Sá da Bandeira	Anabela Vidal
António Durães	João Trovão
Rui Luís Brás	Fausto Vidal
Ricardo Carriço	Artur Silva
Maria D'Aires	Leonor Reis
Nuno Janeiro	Benny Reis
Diogo Lopes	Hugo Pinho
Joana Duarte	Mónica Silva
Luís Garcia	Joel Lemos
João Arrais	Tito Reis
Filipa Nascimento	Íris Candal
Ricardo Oliveira	Simão Alves
Beatriz Frazão	Lucinha Lemos
Henrique Mello	David Teles
Daniela Marques	Beatriz Leal
Andrei Maxinese	Tomás Vidal
Carolina Carvalho	Mariana Dias
Vera Moura	Soraia Dias
Raquel Sampaio	Débora Trovão
Inês Monteiro	Joana Vidal

=== Special Guest Cast ===
Actor/Actress	Characters
José Simões	Frederico Candal
Dinarte Branco	Vítor Pinho

== Awards and nominations ==
Year	Award	Category	Nominated	Result
2019	New York Festivals® International TV & Film Awards 2019	Best Telenovela	Tangled Lives	Bronze
2019	40º Banff World Media Festival – The Rockie Awards	Serials, Soaps & Telenovelas	Tangled Lives	Won
2019	International Emmy Award	Best Telenovela	Tangled Lives	Nominated
