= Rainha das Flores =

Portuguese telenovela

- "So Se Vive Duas Vezes" (Portuguese) "You Only Can Live Twice" (English)
- Also known as: Nova Rainha das Flores
- Starring: Sandra Barata Belo; Isabel Abreu; Pepê Rapazote; Marco Delgado (see more)
- Country of origin: Portugal
- Original language: Portuguese
- No. of episodes: 304

Original release
- Network: SIC
- Release: 9 May 2016 – 13 May 2017

Related
- Poderosas; Espelho d'Água

Rainha das Flores (Frozen Memories) is a Portuguese telenovela first broadcast between 9 May 2016 and 13 May 2017 on SIC.

== Plot ==
She is called the queen of the flowers, not only because her name is ROSA (Rose) but because she grows flowers and ships them all over the world.

Flowers are her business and everyone agrees that it grew into a very successful one. Rosa is a very happy woman. She is married to DANIEL, a furniture designer trying to make his way into professional success. Together they have daughter JULIA, a sweet young girl always trying to do the right thing.

At home, Rosa also has two more people she loves: SOFIA, born from a previous relationship Daniel had with a woman who ran off years ago, and CARMEN, Daniel's mother and the first person to help Rosa in her attempts to start her flower company, Floriz.

Rosa has a very deep faith in God and the Virgin Mary. Religion is one of the pillars in her life. One day, she decides to go on a pilgrimage, to thank for all the good things she received from Him. It ends in tragedy, as Rosa is hit by a car and almost dies. For weeks, she is in a coma. When she finally wakes up, the world is a whole different place. She does not remember her daughter. She also forgot her husband. The last fifteen years have been erased from her memory.

Rosa feels desperate in her hospital bed. Everyone around her feels the same. But Rosa is lucky enough to be assisted by one of the most caring doctors in the hospital, handsome MARCELO, a long time divorced neurologist. It helps to have someone so attentive by her side. But Rosa is struggling with her older memories. And when she calls for someone no one ever heard of, her family is in shock.

Rosa tells her family she has an older sister, NARCISA, and she wants to see her immediately. Daniel will search for this woman everywhere. He will find her in a distant town, struggling in a rough fishing job while trying to send her son BRUNO to the medical school.

Narcisa is tough. But she also hides a terrible secret. Something very bad happened in the past that have separated the two sisters until now. Unfortunately, Rosa does not remember what it was and she may by falling in the most dangerous trap, when she calls her sister back. Narcisa is so greedy, that she may want to steal the flower company from her successful sister. She may even want her happiness and everything else she can get a hold of.

Rosa finally goes home. She does not remember her family but she cannot forget Marcelo, the caring doctor. And when she discovers they both are in love with each other, life will be an unexpected conflict: between what is right and what her heart is longing for.

This will be Rosa's main struggle. Will she stay forever in love with Marcelo, the doctor who saved her, or will she remember how much she always loved her faithful husband?

Step by step, Rosa's memories will come back. While this is happening, Rosa's life will unfold in a powerful romance, full of hard decisions and full of conflict with greedy sister Narcisa.

== Cast ==
Actor/Actress	Characters
Sandra Barata Belo	Rosa Andrade Severo
Isabel Abreu	Narcisa Andrade Severo
Pepê Rapazote	Daniel de Sousa
Marco Delgado	Marcelo Ramos
Gonçalo Diniz	César Barros
Rosa do Canto	Carmen de Sousa
Cristina Homem de Mello	Rute Barros
Bárbara Lourenço	Sofia de Sousa
Luís Garcia	Bruno Severo
António Fonseca	Fialho Barros
Leonor Seixas	Beatriz Correia
Madalena Aragão	Júlia Severo de Sousa
Ricardo Carriço	Rui Sá
Sara Salgado	Renata Sá
Marina Mota	Alexandra Piedade
Bruno Lagrange	Nuno Barros
José Condessa	Tiago Piedade
João Ricardo	Moisés da Paz
Maria d'Aires	Maria da Paz
João Arrais	Rafael da Paz
Marco Costa	Tomás Rossi
Débora Monteiro	Marisa Rossi
António Camelier	Artur
Afonso Lagarto	Fernando Oliveira
Joaquim Horta	Samuel Garcia
Pedro Sousa	Hugo Guedes
Sofia Correia	Lia Pereira
Liliana Santos	Paula Oliveira
Mafalda Jara	Gabriela Galvão
Margarida Moreira	Joana
