= Coração d'Ouro =

Portuguese telenovela

- Promotional poster
- Starring: Rita Blanco; Mariana Pacheco; João Reis; Mariana Monteiro; Diogo Lopes; (see more)
- Country of origin: Portugal
- Original language: Portuguese
- No. of episodes: 326

Original release
- Network: SIC
- Release: 7 September 2015 – 24 September 2016

Coração d'Ouro (Heart of Gold) is a Portuguese telenovela that aired on SIC from September 7, 2015 to September 24, 2016.

== Plot ==
Maria's painful challenge starts when Antonio, her former employer, facing death, decides to make justice for the past and includes her on his will.

His goal is to, somehow, make it up to her and ensure that Maria and her daughter, Catarina, won't have to struggle anymore as he knows the terrible truth: Catarina is Antonio's granddaughter. Maria had a relationship with Antonio's son, Henrique.

What could be a promising start of happiness turns into a nightmare once Catarina, knowing about the will, decides to kill Antonio, without knowing he is actually her grandfather. Maria find's it out and has to choose between justice and her daughter.

Once inheriting shares from a Douro river farm, that produces an international awarded Oporto wine and shares from a medical clinic pioneer in the immunology research, Maria has to face the firm resistance from Henrique, which believes they're both opportunists that misled his father. He will start a war and promises not to give up while he doesn't manage to kick them out of home and regain control of all his father's fortune to the legal family.

Henrique likes to show his fortune while his brother Duarte looks deep to the land and basic values. He is the true responsible for the wine quality. Having faced a death situation in the past he truly changes his life and ends up falling in love with Joana, one of the medical clinic researchers. These two characters will face internal and external struggle. While Duarte goes through a very difficult divorce from Beatriz that manipulates their son in order not to lose her marriage, Joana lives with the shadow of her past happy marriage that ended suddenly when her husband died in a car crash on her birthday. Their love will make us dream along and drives us to believe that strength of feelings will make them win.

== Cast ==
Ator	Personagem
Rita Blanco	Maria Ferreira
João Reis	Henrique Castro de Aguiar
Mariana Pacheco	Catarina Ferreira
Mariana Monteiro	Inês Castro de Aguiar
Diogo Lopes	João Dantas
Maria João Bastos	Beatriz Bacelar Castro de Aguiar
Lúcia Moniz	Joana Amaral
Victor Gonçalves	Duarte Castro de Aguiar
Ana Padrão	Benedita Castro de Aguiar Morgan
Miguel Guilherme	Luís Noronha
José Raposo	Vítor Silva
Custódia Gallego	Fernanda Silva
Alexandre de Sousa	Filipe Amaral
Anabela Teixeira	Isabel Lacerda
Cláudia Vieira	Laura Mendonça
Dinarte Branco	Hélder Oliveira
Diana Chaves	Jéssica Silva
Filipe Vargas	Inácio Lobato
Luciana Abreu	Sandra Moita
Cristóvão Campos	José da Cruz
Adelaide Sousa	Sofia Abrantes Castro de Aguiar
Afonso Melo	Miguel Dantas
Maria João Falcão	Teresa Castro de Aguiar
Paulo Pascoal	Jonas Vemba
Rita Frazão	Margarida Fonseca
Pedro Hossi	William Morgan
João Baptista	Rúben Silva
Rodrigo Soares	Frederico Dantas
Igor Marchesi	Bruno Varela
João Vicente	Vasco Amaral
Hana Sofia Lopes	Adriana Noronha
David Esteves	David Leal
Diogo Martins	Leandro Silva
Eduardo Frazão	Jorge Leitão
Renato Godinho	Nuno
Rúben Gomes	Tiago
Mafalda Luís de Castro	Raquel
Jani Zhao	Marta
João Mota	Tozé
