= Amália (film) =

- Theatrical Poster
- Directed by: Carlos Coelho da Silva
- Written by: Pedro Marta Santos; João Tordo
- Starring: Sandra Barata; Carla Chambel; José Fidalgo
- Distributed by: VC Filmes
- Release date: 4 December 2008
- Running time: 127 minutes
- Country: Portugal
- Language: Portuguese

Amália is a 2008 Portuguese biographical film directed by Carlos Coelho da Silva and starring Sandra Barata, Carla Chambel and José Fidalgo. Barata portrays legendary Portuguese fado singer Amália Rodrigues; songs used in the film are recordings of Amália. The film has been criticised by some members of her family.
