= José Wallenstein =

Portuguese actor

- Born: 18 October 1959 (age 66); Lisbon, Portugal
- Occupation: Actor
- Years active: 1981–present

José Wallenstein (born 18 October 1959) is a Portuguese actor. He appeared in more than ninety films since 1981.

== Selected filmography ==
Film
Year	Title	Role	Notes
2012	A Moral Conjugal		
2005	Alice		
2005	Magic Mirror		
2005	O Crime do Padre Amaro		
2001	Porto of My Childhood		
1983	In the White City		

TV
Year	Title	Role	Notes
2007	Ilha dos Amores	Francisco Varela	
2024	A Promessa	António Fontes Morais	
