= Rosa Fogo =

- Genre: Telenovela
- Country of origin: Portugal
- Original language: Portuguese
- No. of episodes: 225

Original release
- Network: SIC
- Release: 19 September 2011 – 30 June 2012

Rosa Fogo (lit. The Fire of the Rose) is a Portuguese soap opera that aired on SIC from September 2011 to June 2012. Below is a list of cast members, main actors of the production.

== Cast ==
- Cláudia Vieira
- Ângelo Rodrigues
- José Fidalgo
- Rogério Samora

== Awards and nominations ==
Year	Award	Category	Result	Ref.
2012	International Emmy Award	Best Telenovela	Nominated	
