= Terra Brava =

Portuguese telenovela

- English poster for distribution
- Starring: João Catarré; Mariana Monteiro; Maria João Luís; Renato Godinho
- Country of origin: Portugal
- Original language: Portuguese
- No. of episodes: 361

Original release
- Network: SIC
- Release: 28 October 2019 – 7 March 2021

Related
- Vidas Opostas; A Serra

Terra Brava (Wild Land) is a Portuguese telenovela which began airing on SIC on October 28, 2019, and ended on March 7, 2021.

== Plot ==
In Wild Land, we follow the struggle of Diogo, a decorated military, who returns to his homeland to bring justice to Eduarda, who has destroyed his life and family in the past. But he will not have an easy time when he deeply falls in love with Beatriz, the daughter of the woman that he wants to destroy.

On top of that, he finds out Beatriz is married with the obsessed Tiago, his biological younger brother and the only remaining family. How will this interfere with his plans?

A story of revenge, a matriarch determined to keep the past away, a sick love and two brothers fighting for the same woman.

The once quiet land, Vila Brava, is now on fire!

== Cast ==
Actor/Actress	Characters
João Catarré	Rodrigo Bastos/Diogo Moreira
Mariana Monteiro	Beatriz Gonçalves Ferreira
Maria João Luís	Maria Eduarda Gonçalves Ferreira
Renato Godinho	Tiago Branco
Sara Matos	Elsa Santinho
João Jesus	Afonso Maria Gonçalves Ferreira
Luciana Abreu	Cristina «Tina» Macedo
Virgílio Castelo	Francisco Ferreira
Isabel Ruth	Mercedes Ferreira
Fernando Luís	Carlos Moreira
Noémia Costa	Prazeres Pinto
António Fonseca	Raúl Santinho
Rita Loureiro	Rosete Gonçalves
Débora Monteiro	Carla Figueiredo
Marcantónio Del Carlo	André Figueiredo
Bruna Quintas	Alexandra «Xana» Figueiredo
Diogo Valsassina	Vasco Jesus
João Reis	Henrique Costa
Ângela Pinto	Arminda Jesus
Manuel Wiborg	Norberto Jesus
Sofia Sá da Bandeira	Joana Costa
Isabela Valadeiro	Rita Teixeira
Diogo Amaral	Marco Paulo Pinto
Dânia Neto	Candy
João Baptista	Ricardo Janeiro/Padre Filipe Sampaio
Patrícia Tavares	Gabriela Pinto
Guilherme Filipe	Tomás Branco
Catarina Gouveia	Diana Esteves
Vera Moura	Sílvia Figueiredo
Bárbara Lourenço	Mafalda Costa
Afonso Lopes	David Costa
Filipa Nascimento	Catarina Pinto
Tomás Andrade	Martim Branco

=== Special Guest Cast ===
Actor/Actress	Characters
Adriano Luz	Jorge Ferraz
Joana Santos	Teresa Montenegro Bastos
Vítor Silva Costa	Vicente Santos Bastos
