= Luciana Abreu =

Portuguese singer, actress and television host (born 1985)

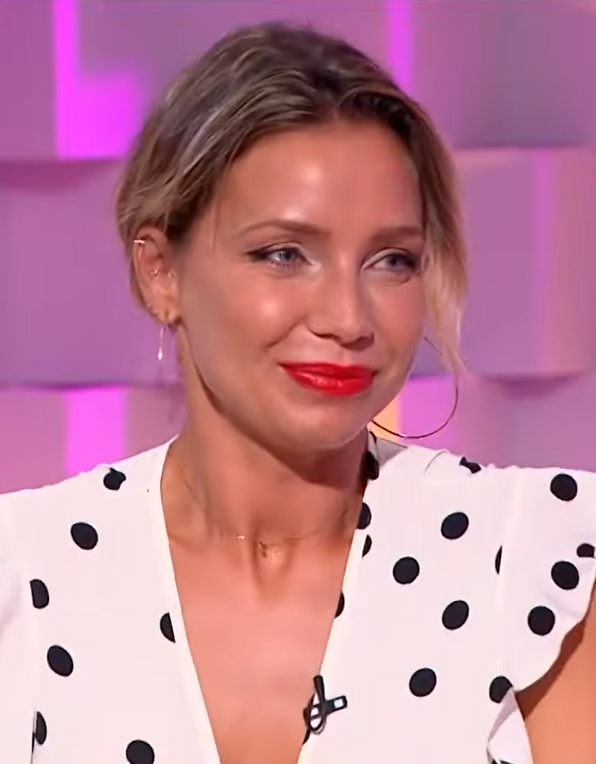
- Luciana Abreu in 2024

Background information
- Born: Luciana Abreu Sodré Costa Real; 25 May 1985 (age 41); Massarelos, Porto, Portugal
- Genres: Pop, R&B, Dance
- Occupations: Singer, actress, television host
- Years active: 2002–present

Luciana Abreu Sodré Costa Real (born 25 May 1985) is a Portuguese singer, actress and television host. Luciana Abreu is known for her participation in Idolos, for representing Portugal in the Eurovision Song Contest 2005 as part of the pop-duo 2B, for her character in 2006 for Floribella as Flor Valente.

== Biography ==
=== Early years ===
She was first noticed at the age of 14, for her participation in the show "Cantigas da Rua", which she won. During 2002 she took part in the play O Casamento, by the Seiva Trupe theatre company, as both actress and singer. Later, in 2003, she starred in the musical play Cabaret Carioca by Carlos Leça, inspired by Chico Buarque's music, in which she took the role of Beatriz.

=== Idolos (Idols) ===
In 2004, Luciana auditioned for the second season of Idolos (the Portuguese version of Pop Idol (British original version)). She was a member of the first group of semi-finalists. She sang a rendition of Christina Aguilera's "The Voice Within" which garnered her a top 10 position

==== Song performances on Portuguese Idol ====
- Original Audition: "Fallin'" (Alicia Keys), "Run to You" (Whitney Houston) and "Povo Que Lavas no Rio" (Amália Rodrigues)
- Top 30: "The Voice Within" (Christina Aguilera) (semi-final group 1)
- Top 10: "Fallin'" (Alicia Keys)
- Top 8: "Povo Que Lavas No Rio" (Amália Rodrigues), (Portuguese music's week)
- Top 7: "I Will Survive" (Gloria Gaynor) (Disco's week)
- Top 6: "Sympathy for the Devil" (Rolling Stones) (Juri's week)

=== Eurovision 2005 ===
Abreu represented Portugal in the Eurovision Song Contest 2005 in Kyiv, Ukraine as part of the pop-duo 2B with Rui Drumond. The duo performed the pop song Amar. However, many mishaps occurred during the live performance (including Abreu's microphone failing several times). The group failed to qualify for the final, placing 17th with 51 points in the semi-final, although they received the maximum 12 points from France, Germany and Switzerland.

=== After Eurovision 2005 ===
After Eurovision Song Contest, Luciana became a hairdresser and manicurist in a hair salon. But Luciana's life was soon to change, as she then became the protagonist of the most popular Portuguese soap opera: Floribella.

=== Floribella ===
After representing Portugal in the Eurovision Song Contest, Luciana auditioned for a role in Floribella. She was selected for the lead role in the show, Flor Valente. The shows tells the story of Cinderella in the 21st century, a poor girl who falls in love with a rich guy, but has her (unknown) bad sister stopping her from being happy. It was one of the most successful TV shows in 2006 and as a result a second season was made in 2007 although it never had the same success. However the music soundtrack reached number one in the Portuguese charts. With the success of Floribella, Luciana became very popular in Portugal. This show beat records.

=== Lucy ===
Luciana was on the cover of the Portuguese magazine CARAS in January 2007. Soon afterwards Abreu became hostess of the show Lucy on SIC. This is a show for kids, where Luciana sings and dances. Luciana appeared on the cover of the Portuguese version of men's magazine FHM (February 2008 issue). Dança Comigo is the Portuguese version of Dancing with the Stars, which Luciana won when she entered its third season.

=== Eurovision 2009 ===
Abreu was the favourite to represent Portugal once again in the Eurovision Song Contest 2009 in Moscow, Russia this time however as a solo singer with a song which she wrote. However she came in third in the final, though winning the televote but gaining only 4 points from the juries.

=== Perfeito Coração ===
Luciana played a manicurist in the soap opera Perfeito Coração (Perfect Heart). It is broadcast on SIC. Now she is playing a fictionalized version of herself in the comedy series Último A Sair (Last Out). It is broadcast on RTP1.

=== Último a sair ===
Lucy participated in a program called Ultimo a sair in which she had to act like if she was really doing that. It was a reality show.

=== A tua cara não me é estranha ===
This program ran on the channel TVI where the participants had to perform artists worldwide. In this program, Luciana Abreu came back to her life for some time off (she had two daughters : Lyonnce and Lyanni). Luciana Abreu interpreted more women than men. She won 4 galas (one of the four, she was the winner).

== Discography ==
Album information
Floribella
- Released:, 2006
- Chart positions: #1 Pt,
- Pt certification: 10× Platinum
- Singles: "Pobres dos Ricos", "Vestido Azul", "Floribella".
Floribella: O Melhor Natal
- Released: 30 November 2006
- Chart positions: #1
- FPA certification: 3× Platinum
- Singles: "Olá 2007!"
Floribella 2
- Released: May 2007
- Chart positions: #1
- FPA certification: 5× Platinum
- Singles: "Corações Ao Vento"
Lucy
- Released: 3 October 2008
- Chart positions: TBA
- FPA certification: TBA
- Singles: "Lucy"

== Television ==
| Year | Title | Role | Other notes |
|---|---|---|---|
| 1999 | Cantigas da Rua | Luciana Abreu | Herself |
| 2005 | Ídolos | Luciana Abreu | Herself |
| 2006 | Floribella | Flor Valente | Leading Role |
| 2007 | Floribella II | Flor Valente | Leading Role |
| 2007 | Dança Comigo | Luciana Abreu | Herself |
| 2008 | Lucy | Luciana Abreu | Herself |
| 2009 | Perfeito Coração | Carla | Supporting Role |
| 2011 | Último a sair | Luciana Abreu | Herself |
| 2012 | A tua cara não me é estranha | Luciana Abreu | Herself |
| 2015 | Coração d'Ouro | Sandra Moita | Supporting Role |
| 2019 | Terra Brava | Cristina «Tina» Macedo | Supporting Role |
| 2021 | Amor Amor | Rebeca Sofia Falcato Mendes | Supporting Role |
| 2025 | Vitória | Marina Brito Gameiro | Supporting Role |

== Filmography ==
| Year | Title | Role | Other notes |
|---|---|---|---|
| 2006 | Arthur and the Minimoys | Selénia | Major Supporting Role (Voice) |

== Personal life ==
She was married to the Portuguese footballer Yannick Djaló and they have two children together.
