= Soraia Chaves =

Portuguese actress and model

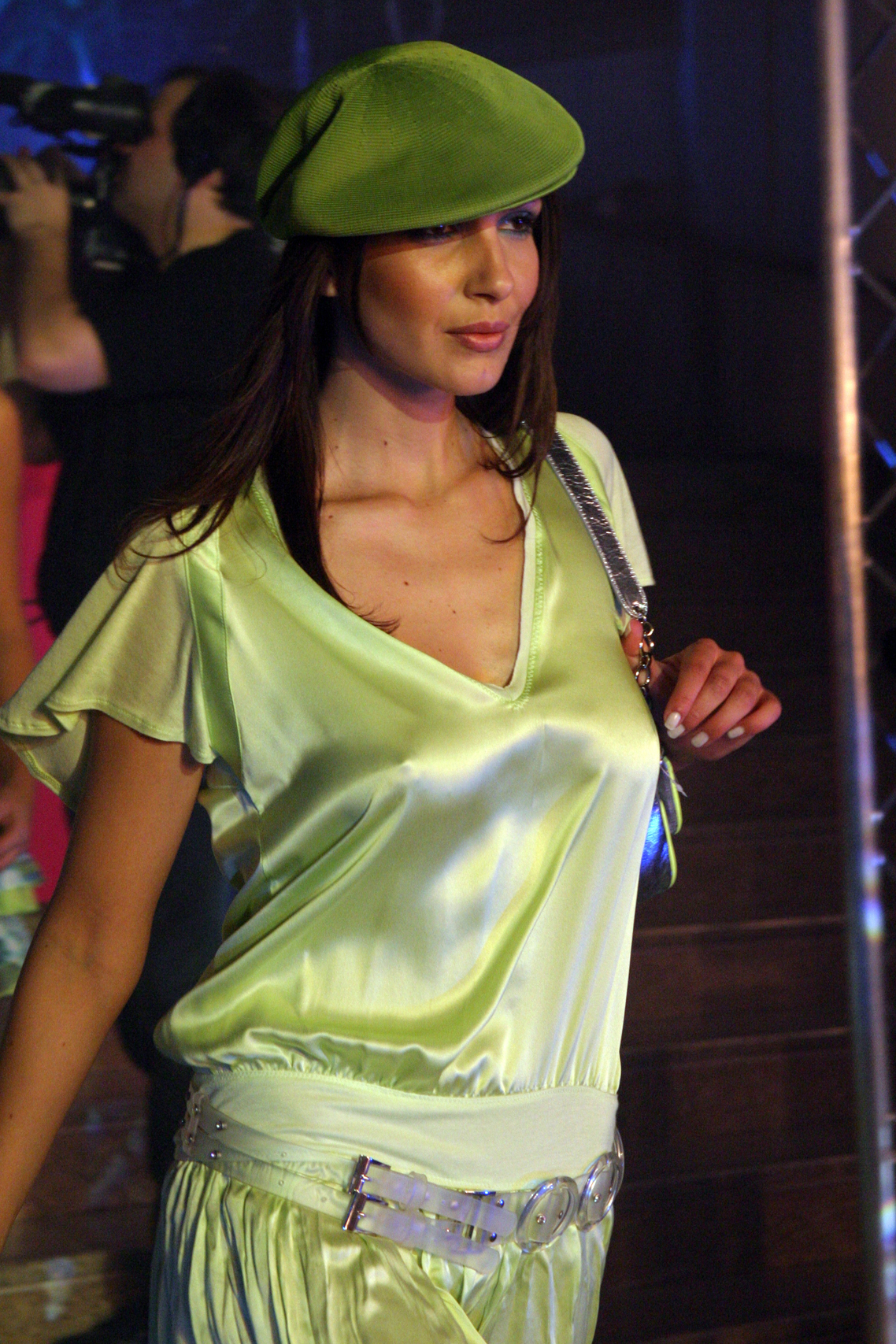
- Soraia Chaves at Portugal Fashion 2005
- Born: 22 June 1982 (age 44); Lisbon, Portugal

Soraia Chaves (born 22 June 1982 in Lisbon) is a Portuguese actress and model. She became famous with the role of Amélia in the film O Crime do Padre Amaro and the role of Maria in her next film, Call Girl. She also played the role of Raquel in Dancing Days, a 2012-13 soap opera broadcast on the Portuguese television network SIC. She also starred in the film Real Playing Game.
