= Dancin' Days (2012 TV series) =

Portuguese telenovela

- Genre: Telenovela; Drama; Romance; Thriller
- Based on: Dancin' Days by Gilberto Braga
- Written by: Pedro Lopes
- Starring: Joana Santos; Soraia Chaves; Joana Ribeiro; Albano Jerónimo; Alexandre de Sousa
- Country of origin: Portugal
- Original language: Portuguese

Original release
- Network: SIC
- Release: 4 June 2012 – 27 September 2013

Related
- Dancin' Days (original series)

Dancin' Days is a Portuguese telenovela that aired on SIC from 2012 to 2013.

== Cast and characters ==
- Joana Santos as Júlia Matos
- Soraia Chaves as Raquel Corte-Real
- Joana Ribeiro as Mariana Corte-Real
- Albano Jerónimo as Duarte Sousa Prado de Oliveira
- Alexandre de Sousa as Zé Maria Corte-Real

== Synopsis ==
Dancin' Days is a remake of a Brazilian telenovela of the same name that aired in 1978–1979. It is the story of Júlia, who is imprisoned for a crime that her sister Raquel committed after a New Year's Eve party. In prison, Júlia becomes pregnant and leaves her daughter, Mariana, with Raquel. From then on, the three are confronted with various problems, but they also become increasingly united.
