= José Fidalgo =

Portuguese model and actor

- Born: José Manuel Fidalgo Soares; August 5, 1979 (age 47); Lisbon, Portugal
- Occupations: Actor, model
- Years active: 2000–present
- Children: 2

José Manuel Fidalgo Soares (born August 5, 1979) is a Portuguese model and actor.

== Personal life ==
He has a son named Lourenço (born 2009) who he had with his ex-wife Fernanda Marinho. He also has a daughter named Maria (born 2014), with Nádia Nóvoa.

== Career ==
Fidalgo's career begun when he was a child, when he acted in theater and television commercials.

In 2007, he appeared in the film Heart Tango, made for Intimissimi, directed by Gabriele Muccino and with Monica Bellucci. In 2008, he starred in Amália, a film portraying the life of Portuguesefado singer Amália Rodrigues.

== Filmography ==
=== Theater ===
- 2006 – 1755- Grande Terramoto, directed by Jorge Fraga, in the Theater of the Trindade
- 2003 – La Ronde, of Arthur Schnitzler, directed by Peter Baron, presented for the Company of In Theater Impetus in the Estefânia Club.
- 2000 – Auto of the Cananeia, of Gil Vicente, directed by Maria Emília Correia, presented for the Company of Theater the Red and the Black in the Convent of D. Dinis in Odivelas.
- 1998/1999 – Metropólis, of Howard Korder, directed by Peter Baron, presented for the Company of In Theater Impetus, in the secondary school Maria Amália.

=== Cinema ===
- 2011 – Milagre, directed by Amadeu Pena da Silva, character "Cristo", Produced by Cristiana Gaspar
- 2011 – Encantado por te Ver (short), Directed by João de Goes, character "Carlos", Produced by João de Goes
- 2007 – Heart Tango, with Monica Bellucci, directed by Gabriele Muccino
- 2007 – Marginal 5, directed by Hugo Diogo, character “Carlos”, Produced by Costa do Castelo Films
- 2005 – Joseph, directed by Marc Ângelo, a production FF Films for the French television
- 2004 – Anita na Praia short story directed by Anabela Teixeira.
- 2003 – Fascinio, directed by Jose Fonseca and Costa, character Bernardette

=== Television ===
- 2007/08 – Fascínios, a TVI soap opera.
- 2006/07 – Tempo de Viver, coordination of Andre Cerqueira, character Bruno Santana, a production NBP for TVI.
- 2005 – Ines, directed by João Cayatte, character Pêro Coelho, a series produced for Antinomy for RTP
- 2004/2005 – Ninguem como Tu, coordination of project of Andre Cerqueira, character Miguel, novel produced for the NBP for the TVI.
- 2004 – Series Inspector Max, directed by Carlos Neves and Atílio Riccó, special participation, a production NBP for the TVI
- 2004 – Maré Alta series, directed by Jorge Marecos, special participation, a production SP Films for the SIC
- 2004 – Queridas Feras, novel directed by Manuel Amaro Costa, character Alexander Master, a production NBP for the TVI
- 2003/2004 – Ana e os Sete, directed by António Moura Matos and Carlos Neves, special appearance, a production NBP for the TVI.
- 2002/2003 – Olhar da Serpente, novel directed by Alvaro Fugulin and Nuno Vieira, character António, a production NBP for the SIC
- 2000/2001 – Presentation of the program Disney club in the RTP
