= Amor Amor (TV series) =

Portuguese telenovela

- English poster for distribution
- Also known as: Amor Amor - Vol. 2
- Starring: Ricardo Pereira; Joana Santos; Paulo Rocha; Maria João Bastos; Luísa Cruz; Filipa Nascimento; Joana Aguiar; Ivo Lucas; Gonçalo Almeida
- Country of origin: Portugal
- Original language: Portuguese
- No. of seasons: 2
- No. of episodes: 376

Original release
- Network: SIC
- Release: January 4, 2021 – June 5, 2022

Amor Amor (Note: The series is titled Amor Amor - Vol. 2 in its second and final season.) (Our Love Songs) is a Portuguese telenovela which began airing on SIC on 4 January 2021 and ended on 5 June 2022.

== Plot ==
=== Season 1 ===
Linda and Romeu have always been best friends – and singers in rival bands. When he turned 18, Linda declared her love, showing him a song she wrote about them.

The two got involved, but soon after Romeo went on tour with his father's band, and he was seduced by one of the singers - the sexy Vanessa.

Later, Linda decides to seek Romeu and after a fatal accident with Romeu's father, they decide to run away.

But the plan changes when Vanessa discovers she is pregnant of Romeu's father, with whom she was also involved with. Duly instructed by her mischievous sister, Angela, she reports Linda to the police.

Thinking she has been betrayed by Romeu, Linda goes to Luxembourg. While the heartbroken Romeu accepts Angela's proposal to become a great singer, if he marries Vanessa and takes the baby that Romeu believes to be his.

Months later, Linda attends one of Romeu's concerts, where he proposes to Vanessa and dedicates the song she wrote, when they were 18, as if it was written by him. That night in the exact same hospital, both Linda, who is pregnant with Romeu's child, and Vanessa go into labour. A failure on the hospital's electrical system will cause a swap of babies, and without knowing anything, Linda ends up raising the daughter of the woman who stole the great love of her life.

Twenty years will pass until Linda and Romeu cross paths again. He is now the king of Portuguese popular music and together with Ângela, his sister-in-law, they launch new singers into the music industry, including Romeu and Sandy, Vanessa's daughter. Coincidently, Sandy's partner will find the next musical prodigy, Linda's daughter – Melanie.

Romeu will invite Melanie for an audition, but Linda forbids her to attend it. When she realizes Melanie ran away to Portugal, Linda will come after her.

It is in Portugal, where everything started, that after seeing Romeu perform the song she wrote, Linda exposes him to the public.

=== Season 2 ===
Romeu and Linda are married and at the height of their success. She is now an established artist while he signed with a Spanish label to get into the Latin market. For this purpose, the label is filming a documentary on Rormeu’s life with plans to show it in cinemas worldwide. Ângela, now reduced to being a petty merchant at local fairs, refuses to be left out of her ex brother-in-law’s story. Her, of all people, who made him a successful singer over twenty years ago. But luck seems to be on her side... One day, while selling at the fair with Cajó, Ângela sees a familiar face among the crowd. Bela is a woman who, twenty years ago, Ângela paid to stop her pregnancy from Romeu’s baby. As she sees her now with Ricky by her side, a boy of around the same age as the child would be by now, Ângela quickly realizes that Bela didn’t go through with it at all and kept quiet about it during all these years. When confronted about it, Bela ends up admitting that Ricky really is Romeu’s son, which will turn into Ângela's biggest asset.

== Cast ==
=== Main ===
Actor/Actress	Characters	Seasons	
Actor/Actress	Characters	1	2
Ricardo Pereira	Romeu Pereira/Romeu Santiago	Main	Main
Joana Santos	Linda Sousa Ribeiro	Main	Main
Paulo Rocha	Bruno Ribeiro	Main	
Maria João Bastos	Vanessa Pinto Pereira	Main	
Luísa Cruz	Ângela Pinto	Main	Main
Filipa Nascimento	Melanie «Mel» Sousa Ribeiro	Main	Main
Ivo Lucas	Leandro Vieira	Main	Main
Joana Aguiar	Sandra «Sandy» Pinto Pereira	Main	Main
Gonçalo Almeida	Ricardo «Ricky» Bernardes		Main

=== Recurring ===
Actor/Actress	Characters	Seasons	
Actor/Actress	Characters	1	2
Rogério Samora	Carlos Jorge «Cajó» Antunes	Recurring	Recurring
João Catarré	Luís Fernandes	Recurring	Recurring
Mariana Pacheco	Cátia Sousa	Recurring	Recurring
José Fidalgo	Rúben Moreira	Recurring	
Luciana Abreu	Rebeca Sofia Falcato Mendes	Recurring	Recurring
Débora Monteiro	Jéssica Isabel Dinis	Recurring	Recurring
Renato Godinho	Vítor Filipe Falcato Mendes	Recurring	Recurring
Pedro Carvalho	Serafim Amorim	Recurring	
Guilherme Moura	Rogério Silva Fernandes	Recurring	Recurring
Manuel Cavaco	Amadeu Paiva	Recurring	
Margarida Carpinteiro	Adelaide Eça de Lima	Recurring	
Rui Unas	Gabriel Torres	Recurring	Recurring
Joana Pais de Brito	Rita Gomes	Recurring	Recurring
Rosa do Canto	Lurdes Ribeiro Sousa	Recurring	Recurring
Fernando Rocha	António Joaquim «Tó Quim» Rato	Recurring	Recurring
Melânia Gomes	Rute Silva Fernandes	Recurring	Recurring
Bárbara Norton de Matos	Emília Carneiro	Recurring	Recurring
Francisco Fernandes	Márcio Filipe Mendes	Recurring	Recurring
João Bettencourt	Lucas Sousa Ribeiro	Recurring	Recurring
Mariana Venâncio	Shakira «Shakirita» Fernandes	Recurring	Recurring
Inês Pires Tavares	Dora Marisa Silva Fernandes	Recurring	Recurring
Madalena Alberto	Julieta Serrão	Recurring	
João Baptista (actor)	Gastão da Cruz Almeida	Recurring	
Rui Mendes	Jaime Honrado		Recurring
Diogo Valsassina	Evaristo Venâncio		Recurring
Tiago Aldeia	Adam		Recurring
Xana Abreu	Denise		Recurring
Lídia Franco	Gina Honrado		Recurring
Ricardo Raposo	André Miranda		Recurring
Vera Moura	Tânia Patrícia		Recurring

=== Guest cast ===
Actor/Actress	Characters	Seasons	
Actor/Actress	Characters	1	2
Almeno Gonçalves	Anselmo Pereira	Guest	
Rita Blanco	Paloma Antunes	Guest	
Alexandra Lencastre	Bela Bernardes		Guest
Miguel Guilherme	Pedro «Pepe» Antunes		Guest
Heitor Lourenço	Valentim Valério		Guest

== Telenovela overview ==
Season	Episodes	Originally released	
Season	Episodes	First released	Last released
1	202	January 4, 2021	October 2, 2021
2	174	October 4, 2021	March 5, 2022
