= Prisioneira =

- "Ninguém foge ao destino" (Portuguese) "Nobody flees to fate" (English)
- Genre: Melodrama
- Created by: Maria João Mira
- Developed by: Plural Entertainment
- Directed by: António Borges Correia
- Starring: Joana Ribeiro; Carloto Cotta; Kelly Bailey; Lourenço Ortigão; Nuno Gil (see more)
- Opening theme: Don't Try by Sissi Martins (season 1); Tal Como Sou by Fernando Daniel (season 2)
- Ending theme: Don't Try by Sissi Martins (season 1); Tal Como Sou by Fernando Daniel (season 2)
- Country of origin: Portugal
- Original language: Portuguese
- No. of seasons: 2
- No. of episodes: 219

Production
- Running time: 55min

Original release
- Network: TVI
- Release: May 21, 2019 – February 22, 2020

Related
- Valor da Vida; Quer o Destino

Prisioneira (English: Trapped) is a Portuguese telenovela broadcast and produced by TVI. It is written by Maria João Mira. The telenovela premiered on May 21, 2019 and ended on February 22, 2020. It is recorded between Lisbon and Tunisia.

== Plot ==
A revolutionary Muslim doctor is fighting for a fair and less fractured world. He falls madly in love with a Portuguese woman and rescues her from a loveless life. However, this rescue turns into an unexpected captivity and an unfair fight for the custody of a child, since he is forced to marry another woman.

The plot, which takes place between Lisbon and a Maghreb country features a love among different beliefs and traditions that will always be affected by a terror attack.

== Seasons ==
Season	Episodes	Originally released	
Season	Episodes	First released	Last released
1	98	May 21, 2019	September 10, 2019
2	121	September 11, 2019	February 22, 2020

== Cast ==
Actor/Actress	Character	Season	
Actor/Actress	Character	1	2
Joana Ribeiro	Teresa Loureiro Cunha	Protagonist	Guest
Carloto Cotta	Omar Maluf	Protagonist	Guest
Kelly Bailey	Glória Loureiro	Antagonist	Protagonist
Lourenço Ortigão	Frederico «Fredy» Cruz	Antagonist	Protagonist
Nuno Gil	Samuel	Guest	Antagonist
Diogo Infante	Vítor Loureiro	Co-Antagonist	Co-Antagonist
Paulo Pires	Diogo Lacerda	Co-Protagonist	Co-Protagonist
Joana Seixas	Lídia Cunha	Co-Antagonist	Co-Antagonist
José Wallenstein	Júlio Cunha	Regular	Absent
Paula Lobo Antunes	Margarida Lacerda	Regular	Regular
Vera Kolodzig	Samira Ibrahim	Co-Antagonist	Co-Antagonist
Sandra Faleiro	Graça Andrade e Sousa	Regular	Regular
Benedita Pereira	Monique Matias	Regular	Regular
Rita Salema	Elsa Cornélio	Regular	Absent
Sara Prata	Leonor Teixeira	Regular	Regular
Ângelo Torres	Henrique Drummond	Regular	Absent
Vítor Hugo	Mário Andrade e Sousa	Regular	Regular
Thiago Rodrigues	Gustavo Tudela	Regular	Regular
Sofia Aparício	Leila Maluf	Regular	Regular
Tiago Teotónio Pereira	Tomé Andrade e Sousa	Regular	Regular
Vítor d'Andrade	Sílvio Cruz	Regular	Regular
Lucas Dutra	Sahid Lopes	Regular	Regular
Margarida Corceiro	Carolina Atalaia	Regular	Regular
Sérgio Praia	Acácio Teixeira	Regular	Regular
Graciano Dias	James Marques Farrel	Regular	Regular
Ana Cristina Oliveira	Letícia Drummond	Regular	Absent
Diogo Mesquita	Bashir Ibrahim	Regular	Absent
Catarina Bonnachi	Beatriz Drummond	Regular	Absent
Catarina Bonnachi	Constança Drummond	Regular	Absent
Pedro Tavares	Fábio Silva	Regular	Absent
Julie Sergeant	Telma Braga	Absent	Regular
Cassiano Carneiro	Murilo Braga	Absent	Regular
Filipa Pinto	Renata Braga	Absent	Regular
Maria Arrais	Madalena	Absent	Regular
Susana Arrais	Cecília/Isabel	Absent	Regular
Pedro Hossi	Eduardo	Absent	Regular
Marina Albuquerque	Susete	Absent	Regular
André Nunes	Dário	Absent	Regular
Mateus Choon	Hassan	Absent	Regular
Rita Ribeiro	Fátima Maluf	Regular	Regular
Lia Gama	Helena Lopes	Regular	Regular
