= Cinema of São Tomé and Príncipe =

The cinema of São Tomé and Príncipe refers to the relatively small film industry of São Tomé and Príncipe. It does not have an extensive history, since São Tomé and Príncipe is not a large island although some filmmaking has been achieved. As of 2021, the country did not have any cinemas.

== Colonial filmmaking ==
Colonial filmmakers shot ethnographic documentaries in São Tomé and Príncipe: Ernesto de Albuquerque shot A cultura do Cacau em Sao Tome in 1909, and Cardoso Furtado shot Serviçal e Senhor in 1910. Before its independence, the country had six cinemas.

== Contemporary filmmaking ==
After independence, filmmaking was mainly aimed at nation-building: the Ministry of Information made documentaires revolving around members of political parties. The first feature film from São Tomé and Príncipe was A frutinha do Equador (Little Fruit from the Equator), a 1998 coproduction between Austria, Germany and São Tomé and Príncipe. Directed by Herbert Brodl, with São Tomé actors, the film is an allegory combining aspects. from fairy tales, documentaries, road movies and comedy films.

Since the 21th century, development issues related to the environment, ecology, memory and culture have taken the forefront. In 2014, the FestFilm festival (International Film Festival of Sao Tome and Principe) was founded, whose head office and organisation is based in Portugal. In 2017, Mina Kiá (The Little Housemaid), a short drama film by Katya Aragão, was released. The film depicts the hardships faced by São Toméan girls.

== Notable films ==
Documentaries set in the island include:

- Extra Bitter: The Legacy of the Chocolate Islands (2000), documentary by Derek Vertongen
- Sao Tome, cent-pour-pent cacao (2004), documentary by Virginie Berda
- Mionga ki Ôbo (2005), documentary by Ângelo Torres
- The Lost Wave (2007), surf documentary by Sam George
- São Tomé e Príncipe: Retalhos de uma História (2015), documentary by Nilton Medeiros and Jerónimo Moniz
- Serviçais, das Memórias à Identidade (2017), documentary by Nilton Medeiros
- Sombras do Poder (2020), documentary on political memory by Nilton Medeiros and Jerónimo Moniz
