= Bem me Quer =

Portuguese telenovela

- "A vida é feita de escolhas" (Portuguese) "Life is all about choices" (English)
- Genre: Melodrama, Romantic
- Created by: Maria João Mira
- Developed by: Plural Entertainment
- Starring: Kelly Bailey; José Condessa; Bárbara Branco
- Opening theme: "Bem me Quer" by Joana Almeirante
- Country of origin: Portugal
- Original language: Portuguese
- No. of episodes: 298

Production
- Running time: 55min

Original release
- Network: TVI
- Release: October 26, 2020 – November 12, 2021

Bem me Quer (English: Broken Bonds) is a Portuguese soap opera (telenovela) broadcast and produced by TVI. It is written by Maria João Mira. The soap opera (telenovela) premiered on October 26, 2020 and ended on November 12, 2021. It is recorded in Serra da Estrela and also in Aveiro.

== History ==
"Bem me Quer" tells of the adventures of a shepherdess who's spent all her life in a remote village in Serra da Estrela and is suddenly forced to go and live in the city. It's a romantic story that touches on topics such as family and friendship, ambition and greed: but mostly, love. Maria Rita lives with her grandfather, they are small producers of traditional local cheese. She loves her life and wouldn't exchange it for anything, but her freedom and the world she knows are at risk, as the dairy is threatened by imminent bankruptcy.

== Actors ==
Actor/Actress	Character
Kelly Bailey	Maria Rita Raposo
José Condessa	David Quintela
Bárbara Branco	Vera Trindade de Sousa
Pepê Rapazote	Henrique Trindade de Sousa
São José Correia	Mercedes Trindade de Sousa
Joaquim Horta	Rodolfo Quintela
Julie Sergeant	Carmo Quintela
Pompeu José	Honório Raposo
Rita Ribeiro	Teodora Romão
David Carreira	Artur Cunha
Patrícia André	Luzia Cunha
Paula Neves	Célia «Celinha» Romão
André Nunes	Pompeu Romão
Frederico Barata	João Carlos «Joca» Romão
Helena Caldeira	Marlene Simões
Sofia Aparício	Madalena Quintela
Luísa Ortigoso	Aldina Cavaco
Inês Aguiar	Laura Cunha
Lucas Dutra	João Maria Trindade de Sousa
Gabriela Mirza	Leonor Quintela
Margarida Corceiro	Constança Trindade de Sousa
Angie Costa	Susana «Suzy» Romão
Marisa Cruz	Carolina Raposo
Luís Gaspar	Barnabé
Duarte Gomes	Nuno
Vítor Hugo	Paulo
Joana de Verona	Lara

=== Guest cast ===
Actor/Actress	Character
Cucha Carvalheiro	Júlia Trindade de Sousa

=== Child cast ===
Actor/Actress	Character
João Pereira	Alexandre «Alex» Romão
Gabriela Sousa Pina	Sandra Cunha
Mel Barbosa	Maria Trindade de Sousa Cunha
