= Luís Esparteiro =

Portuguese actor (born 1959)

- Born: Luís Augusto Esparteiro Lopes da Costa; April 8, 1959 (age 67); Coimbra, Santo António dos Olivais, Portugal
- Occupation: Actor
- Years active: 1982–present
- Spouse: Vanda Correia (m. 2009)
- Children: 4

Luís Augusto Esparteiro Lopes da Costa (born April 8, 1959), known professionally as Luís Esparteiro, is a Portuguese actor. He is best known for his role as Miguel Ferreira da Fonseca, the primary antagonist of the Portuguese telenovela Ouro Verde.

== Early life and career ==
Luís Esparteiro was born on April 8, 1959 in Coimbra, Portugal to Mário Nuno do Canto Lopes da Costa and Maria Helena Botelho da Costa Marques Esparteiro. His maternal grandfather Joaquim Marques Esparteiro was a Portuguese naval officer and the former Governor of Macau. Growing up, he studied at the Colégio Militar in Lisbon, and later joined the University of Lisbon as a faculty member in the medical school.

Luís made his acting debut in a theatre company run by Portuguese actor Henrique Santana, where he participated in productions of the comedies O Meu Rapaz é Rapariga, Um Fantasma Chamado Isabel and Boeing-Boeing. In 1982, he made his television debut in the soap opera Vila Faia, and later participated in the programs Eu Show Nico and Euronico, produced by Nicolau Breyner.

Luís participated in further theatre productions, including Piaf alongside Bibi Ferreira, and in a performance of Quem Muda a Fralda à Menina at the Teatro Villaret. At Artistas Unidos, he was part of the cast of A queda do egoísta Johan Fatzer, written by playwright by Bertolt Brecht, and Buraco Negro e Câncer, written by Gerardjan Rijnders and directed by Isabel Muñoz Cardoso.

In 1998, Luís made his feature film debut in The Mutants, directed by Teresa Villaverde.

In 2017, Luís played the role of the central antagonist Miguel Ferreira da Fonseca in the telenovela Ouro Verde. The series was Luís' longest-running television role, and won the International Emmy Award for Best Telenovela in 2018. Luís stated that the project was a rewarding experience, and described the character of Miguel as a "deviously intelligent person".

== Family ==
Luís Esparteiro has one older sister, Amélia Maria, and two younger siblings, Joaquim Manuel and Maria Teresa. In a February 2022 interview on the talk show Júlia, Luís revealed that his older brother, Nuno José, had died of a drug overdose at the age of 27.

=== Marriages and children ===
Luís' first marriage was to Filipa Helena Boulton Pimentel Trigo on October 1, 1987. On January 13, 1989, their first son, Guilherme Boulton Trigo Lopes da Costa, was born. Their second child, Constança Boulton Trigo Lopes da Costa, was born on May 21, 1991. The couple ultimately divorced.

On April 18, 2009, Luís married Vanda Isabel da Costa Correia in a private civil ceremony in Lisbon. The couple have a daughter, Teresa Correia Esparteiro Lopes da Costa, and a son, Luís Correia Esparteiro Lopes da Costa, both born before marriage.

== Filmography ==
=== Television ===
Year	Project	Role	Notes	Channel
1982	Vila Faia	Manuel Marinhais	Main Cast	RTP1
1982	Gente Fina É Outra Coisa	Tiago Penha Leredo	Main Cast	RTP1
1987	Palavras Cruzadas	Bernardo	Main Cast	RTP1
1988	Eu Show Nico	Various Roles		RTP1
1988	Os Homens da Segurança	Francisco	Special Participation	RTP1
1989	Sétimo Direito	António Melo	Special Participation	RTP1
1989	Ricardina e Marta	Francisco Moniz	Main Cast	RTP1
1990	Euronico	Various Roles		RTP1
1991	A Árvore	João	Main Cast	RTP1
1992	Cinzas	Eurico Marques	Secondary Cast	RTP1
1993	Marina, Marina	Luís	Special Participation	RTP1
1994	Nico d'Obra	Photographer	Special Participation	RTP1
1994	Na Paz dos Anjos	Manuel Sancho	Secondary Cast	RTP1
1994	Desencontros	Bernardo Pimenta	Co-Protagonist	RTP1
1995	Roseira Brava	João Pedro Morais	Main Cast	RTP1
1995–1996	Primeiro Amor	Gonçalo Mendes Ferreira	Main Cast	RTP1
1996	Vidas de Sal	Manuel Paiva	Special Participation	RTP1
1996	Polícias	Diogo	Protagonist	RTP1
1996–1997	Filhos do Vento	Luís Simões	Main Cast	RTP1
1997	A Grande Aposta	Carlos Costa	Co-Protagonist	RTP1
1997	Cuidado com a Língua!	Angel	Special Participation	RTP1
1999	Uma Casa em Fanicos	António	Special Participation	RTP1
1999	Jornalistas	Pedro	Special Participation	SIC
1999	O Fura-Vidas	Joy Silver	Additional Cast	SIC
1999	A Hora da Liberdade	Major Costa Neves	Main Cast	SIC
1999	Esquadra de Polícias	Stringers	Special Participation	RTP1
1999–2000	A Lenda da Garça	Alberto Basto Queirós	Main Cast	RTP1
2000	A Raia dos Medos	Lieutenant	Special Participation	RTP1
2000	Ajuste de Contas	Mário (60 Years)	Special Participation	RTP1
2000	Todo o Tempo do Mundo	Armindo	Main Cast	TVI
2000	Crianças SOS	Quinjó	Special Participation	TVI
2000–2002	Super Pai	Vasco Figueiredo	Protagonist	TVI
2003–2004	Morangos com Açúcar	Daniel Duarte	Antagonist	TVI
2004–2005	Mistura Fina	Adriano Côrte-Real	Protagonist	TVI
2004	Inspetor Max	Fernando	Special Participation	TVI
2005	Os Serranos	Eduardo	Special Participation	TVI
2005 –2006	Dei-te Quase Tudo	Carlos Capelo	Antagonist	TVI
2006–2007	Tu e Eu	Edmundo Castanheira	Antagonist	TVI
2007–2008	Deixa-me Amar	João Botelho	Antagonist	TVI
2008	Casos da Vida	Henrique	Episode: "Saldo Negativo"	TVI
2008–2009	Feitiço de Amor	Augusto Neves	Co-Protagonist	TVI
2009–2010	Sentimentos	Manuel Coutinho	Co-Protagonist	TVI
2010–2011	Espírito Indomável	Rodrigo Monteiro Castro	Antagonist	TVI
2012–2013	Louco Amor	Rafael Correia	Antagonist	TVI
2013	Casos da Vida	João	Episode: "Vidas (Des)enrascadas"	TVI
2014	Bairro	Diretor	Additional Cast	TVI
2014	Giras & Falidas	Inspector of ASAE	Special Participation	TVI
2015–2016	Santa Bárbara	Júlio Montemor	Main Cast	TVI
2016	Bem-Vindos a Beirais	Gastão	Additional Cast	TVI
2016	A Única Mulher	Jeremy	Special Participation	TVI
2017	Ouro Verde	Miguel Ferreira da Fonseca	Antagonist	TVI
2017–2018	Jogo Duplo	Vítor Duque	Main Cast	TVI
2018–2019	A Teia	Valdemar Seixas	Main Cast	TVI
2019	Teorias da Conspiração	Francisco Bernard	Additional Cast	RTP1
2019	Amar Depois de Amar	António Gouveia	Main Cast	TVI
2020	Quer o Destino	Alfredo Paulo Reis	Main Cast	TVI
2021–2023	Para Sempre	Bento Sampaio de Menezes	Antagonist	TVI
2022–2023	Por Ti	Rui Guerreiro	Antagonist	SIC
2023–2024	Flor sem Tempo	Eduardo Vaz	Co- Antagonist	SIC
2024–2025	A Promessa	Rogério Candeias	Main Cast	SIC
2025	Vitória	Rogério Martins	Main Cast	SIC

=== Streaming ===
Year	Project	Role	Notes	Platform
2023	Marco Paulo	Mário Martins	Main Cast	OPTO
2023–2024	Os Eleitos	António	Recurring Cast	OPTO

=== Cinema ===
Year	Title	Role
1998	Os Mutantes	
1999	Mal	
1999	Inferno	
2000	Peixe na Lia	
2001	Camarate	
2002	Debaixo da Cama	
2005	O Crime do Padre Amaro	Rafael
2005	Fatal	
2009	Duas Mulheres	Dr. André
2009	Quero Ser uma Estrela	Ambassador of Portugal
2010	Moi, Bernadette, J'ai Vu	
2018	Linhas de Sangue	Leonardo Gama
