= Por Ti (Portuguese TV series) =

- English poster for distribution
- Genre: Telenovela
- Created by: Artur Ribeiro
- Developed by: Alexandre Castro
- Written by: Alexandre Castro; Joana Andrade; Ana Lúcia Carvalho; Andreia Vicente Martins; Cândida Ribeiro; Filipa Poppe; Manuel Carneiro
- Directed by: Bruno Oliveira
- Starring: Filipa Areosa; Lourenço Ortigão; Rita Blanco; Dalila Carmo; Sandra Faleiro; João Reis; Luís Esparteiro; Duarte Gomes
- Opening theme: "Leva-me a Viajar (Associação Sara Carreira Version)" by several interpreters
- Ending theme: "Leva-me a Viajar (Associação Sara Carreira Version)" by several interpreters
- Country of origin: Portugal
- Original language: Portuguese
- No. of episodes: 200

Production
- Production locations: SP Televisão studios; Cartaxo (in Valada and Vila Chã de Ourique)
- Camera setup: Multi-camera
- Running time: ± 50 min.

Original release
- Network: SIC
- Release: 7 March 2022 – March 9, 2023

Related
- A Serra; Flor Sem Tempo

Por Ti (English title: For You) is a Portuguese telenovela produced by SP Televisão and broadcast by SIC. It premiered on 7 March 2022 ended on 9 March 2023. The telenovela is an idea of Artur Ribeiro developed by Alexandre Castro and written too by Alexandre Castro and Joana Andrade, Ana Lúcia Carvalho, Andreia Vicente Martins, Cândida Ribeiro, Filipa Poppe and Manuel Carneiro. It stars Filipa Areosa, Lourenço Ortigão, Rita Blanco, Dalila Carmo, Sandra Faleiro, João Reis, Luís Esparteiro and Duarte Gomes.

== Plot ==
When Mia decided to quit her promising career as an attorney in the capital, and temporarily move back to her parents’ in search of peace, she would never imagine that she'd be at the centre of a conflict that would change her life. In the parish of Rio de Meandro there are two villages locked in a perpetual war with each other, now made even worse by the construction project for a dam that will condemn one of them underwater. Their fight for survival will be at the forefront of the savage head to head between Mia's parents, Mónica and Paulo, residing in Aldeia Nova, and Afonso's parents, Helena and parish chairman Rui Guerreiro, residing in Aldeia Velha. Afonso is a local who had no shortage of women fawning over him, but went away to study engineering in Lisbon. He hasn't come back too often since then. He believes in progress and is kind at heart.

== Cast ==
- Filipa Areosa as Mia Amado
- Lourenço Ortigão as Afonso Guerreiro
- Rita Blanco as Renata Jones/Joana Pires
- Dalila Carmo as Mónica Amado
- Sandra Faleiro as Helena Guerreiro
- João Reis as Paulo Amado
- Luís Esparteiro as Rui Guerreiro
- Duarte Gomes as Gabriel Almeida Borges
- Alexandra Lencastre as Isabel Brito
- Fernando Luís as Miguel Brito
- Diogo Martins as Nuno Macedo
- Paula Lobo Antunes as Constança Melchior
- Jorge Corrula as José «Zé» Ferreira Pinho
- Mafalda Vilhena as Alexandra «Xana» Ferreira Pinho
- Rui Melo as Bernardo Melchior
- Dânia Neto as Armanda Silva
- João Baptista as António «Tó Calhau» Ferreira Pinho
- Diogo Amaral as Dieter Weissemuller
- Raquel Tavares as Dulce Esperança
- Jorge Mourato as Manuel «Neca» Ferreira Pinho
- Bruno Cabrerizo as Orlando Jesus and Giuseppe Casanova
- Bárbara Lourenço as Mary Louise Blake
- Matilde Reymão as Luísa Melchior
- Maria Emília Correia as Amélia Campos
- João Maria Pinto as Matias Guerreiro
- Carlos Areia as Tomás «Tosso» Soares
- Beatriz Frazão as Rita Melchior
- Simão Fumega as Simão Brito
- Paula de Magalhães as Lara Brito
- Francisca Salgado as Adelaide Soares Costa

=== Guest stars ===
- José Raposo as Eugénio Pereira
- Ruy de Carvalho as Hilário Domingues

== Production ==
In January 2021, the pre-production for the telenovela began. In the end of the same year, more exactly on 15 November, the first scenes began to be filmed in SP Televisão studios and in Cartaxo district, Valada and Vila Chã de Ourique. The last scenes of the telenovela were filmed on 9 June 2022.

== Ratings ==
Season	Episodes	First aired		Last aired		Avg. viewers (points)
Season	Episodes	Date	Viewers (points)	Date	Viewers (points)	Avg. viewers (points)
1	261	7 March 2022	9.7	March 9, 2023	4.2	20.2%

Premiering with the purpose of raising the audiences left of its predecessor in the time slot (Amor Amor - Vol. 2), Por Ti saw one of the worst pilot-episode rating of the first track of telenovelas broadcast by SIC, drawing a rating of 9.7 points and audience share of 22.7%.

Since the second episode, the telenovela begins to fail to maintain the lead of audiences, and as of 30 May it was transferred to the second track of telenovelas, where it manages to lead the audience sporadically until got the consolidation of the public and reach the leadership almost every day.
