= Guida Maria =

Portuguese actress (1950–2018)

- Born: 23 January 1950; Campo de Ourique, Lisbon, Portugal
- Died: 2 January 2018 (aged 67); Lisbon, Portugal
- Education: American Academy of Dramatic Arts
- Occupation: Actress
- Years active: 1957–2016
- Spouse: Mike Sergeant (m. 1969; div. 1972)
- Children: 2, including Julie Sergeant

Guida Maria (23 January 1950 – 2 January 2018) was a Portuguese actress. Her career spanned 60 years and included appearances on stage, in film and on television.

== Early life ==
Maria was born in 1950 in Campo de Ourique, Lisbon. Her father, Luis Cerqueira, was an actor and encouraged his daughter to audition for stage roles. When Maria was seven she appeared in the play Fire of Vista, and when she was 12 she played Helen Keller in The Miracle Worker; the production toured Portugal for over a year and was considered a huge success.

== Career ==
=== Theatre ===
Over her career, Maria appeared in more than 40 plays. From 1978-98, she was a member of the cast of the National Theater Dona Maria II. In 1980, at the age of 30, she was awarded a scholarship to study theatre at the American Academy of Dramatic Arts in New York, and took a 2-year leave of absence from her position.

On leaving the National Theater in 1998, Maria found herself without regular work and decided to invest in plays herself. Maria purchased the rights to a play by Eve Ensler, The Vagina Monologues and had it translated into Portuguese. She secured a director, Celso Cleto, a venue, the Estoril Casino, and debuted in the play in October 2000. It ran for a number of months and attracted thousands in audiences. She also starred in the play in two further seasons – at the Teatro Villaret in 2002, and at the Casino de Lisboa in 2009.

In 2001, she co-starred in a play Andy and Melissa, which was later cancelled due to poor attendances. In 2004, she played the lead in Zelda, based on the life of Zelda Fitzgerald, a play which she had also purchased the rights to herself. In 2015 she appeared in the play Sex? Yes, but with orgasm, which centred on the limitations of sexuality, followed by the play The Malicious Tobacco.

=== Film ===
In 1973, Maria starred in the film The Vows, which was screened at the Cannes Film Festival. She also appeared in The Wisdom Principle (1975), The Seven Headed Head (1978) and The Emissaries of Khalom (1988), all of which were directed by António de Macedo. Other films included The Baron of Altamira (1986) and Serenity (1987).

=== Television ===
Maria appeared in a number of television films, series and miniseries, including A Única Mulher (The Only Woman) and the Brazilian series O Bem-Amado.

=== Publications ===
In 2009 Maria published her autobiography, Guida Maria – Uma Vida.

== Personal life ==
Maria had two children: Pedro Daniel, born when she was 17 years old, and Julie Sergeant, born when she was 20. In 1969, Maria married a Scottish musician, Mike Sergeant; they divorced in 1972.

== Death ==
In December 2017 Maria was admitted to São Francisco Xavier Hospital in Lisbon. She died there on 2 January 2018 aged 67, of pancreatic cancer.
