= Vitória (2025 TV series) =

- English poster for distribution
- Genre: Telenovela
- Created by: Cândida Ribeiro; Rita Roberto
- Based on: Gülperi by Eylem Canpolat and Sema Ergenekon
- Written by: Ana Casaca; Filipa Poppe; Gonçalo Pereira; José Pinto Carneiro; Miguel Rico
- Directed by: Jorge Cardoso
- Starring: Cláudia Vieira; Jorge Corrula; Vanessa Giácomo; José Raposo; Afonso Pimentel; Joana Santos; Vicente Gil; Mariana Cardoso; Rodrigo Costa; Albano Jerónimo
- Opening theme: "Afronto" by Rodrigo Leão
- Ending theme: "Afronto" by Rodrigo Leão
- Country of origin: Portugal
- Original language: Portuguese
- No. of seasons: 3
- No. of episodes: 278

Production
- Production locations: SP Televisão studios; Vila Nova de Gaia; Alto Minho
- Camera setup: Multi-camera
- Running time: ± 50 min.

Original release
- Network: SIC; OPTO; Disney+
- Release: September 22, 2025 – October 19, 2026

Vitória is a Portuguese telenovela produced by SP Television in collaboration with Disney and broadcast by SIC, simultaneously on Disney+. It premiered on 22 September 2025 and ended on 19 October 2026. The telenovela is an adaptation of the Turkish series Gülperi, created and written by Eylem Canpolat and Sema Ergenekon. Adapted by Cândida Ribeiro and Rita Roberto, it has the collaboration of Ana Casaca, Filipa Poppe, Gonçalo Pereira, José Pinto Carneiro and Miguel Rico. It stars Cláudia Vieira, Jorge Corrula, Vanessa Giácomo, José Raposo, Luísa Cruz, Afonso Pimentel, Joana Santos, Vicente Gil, Mariana Cardoso and Rodrigo Costa. Albano Jerónimo joined the cast in season 2.

== Telenovela overview ==
Season	Episodes	Originally released	
Season	Episodes	First released	Last released
1	112	September 22, 2025	February 27, 2026
2	70	March 2, 2026	June 5, 2026
3	96	June 8, 2026	October 19, 2026

== Plot ==
=== Season 1 (2025-2026) ===
Promotional poster for the season 1.

Vitória struggles to protect her family when she finds out that her father-in-law, Manuel Mendonça, is a criminal who is willing to sacrifice family ties for the sake of his wealth and power.

After the tragic death of her husband, Vitória tries to shield her children from their grandfather's influence and prove the crimes of the tyrant Mendonça.

While defending herself from an attack by her brother-in-law, she ends up being arrested and loses custody of her children. Two years later, she gets out of jail determined to get Afonso, Beatriz, and Francisco back. But she is far from imagining that Manuel has managed to turn her children against her and that he will do anything to keep her away from the family.

With the support of João, a lawyer and her first love, Vitória will fight to win back the love and trust of her children and expose her father-in-law, putting the Mendonça empire at risk.

=== Season 2 (2026) ===
Promotional poster for the season 2.

After the explosion in Spain caused by Manuel, everyone believes that Henrique died. In fact, he survived the incident that left him reprisals, and ran out of memory. Vulnerable, they use him to traffic drugs, under his new identity Xavier Ochoa. Eventually, Henrique ends up being arrested and during the following five years, he recovers his memory and is determined to fight for his innocence. When this happens, he is released.

Days before being free, contact Carolina and tell her the whole truth. In shock, Carolina is thirsty for revenge against Manuel - whose relationship would no longer be in its best days. The villain decides to ask her husband for a divorce and, to avenge Henrique, plots a plan to kill Manuel, gradually poisoning him.

Henrique, already free, decides to return to Porto, exactly five years after being presumly dead. The reunion with Vitória is devastating. Her unexpected reappearance shakes the fragile balance conquered by Vitória, who will have to face all the doubts and uncertainties that settle in her heart, now divided between past and present.

But the worst is yet to come. Carolina and Isabel prepare for the beginning of their alliance, united by the desire for revenge in a relentless strategy to definitively remove Vitória from her children. At the centre of the legal battle are Matilde, Afonso and Francisco - and all limits seem about to be exceeded. Henrique, manipulated by Carolina, will be a fundamental key to the plan.

Family conflicts intensify with disagreements about the custody of children, unbalancing the relationship between Henrique and Vitória. And when long-hidden secrets begin to emerge, the world of Vitória and her children threatens to collapse and, this time, not even João will be able to save them.

=== Season 3 (2026) ===
Promotional poster for the season 3.

After Henrique has faked death again, João seeks to prove his innocence and expose the real person responsible for the stabbing. Henrique, on the other hand, is again next to Vitória and her children, and the happiness he found contrasts brutally with what is about to happen. Júlio Ochoa, the author of the attack on Henrique, returns with the determination of those who do not accept to fail again.

The tension worsens after Carolina murders Manuel. But the reading of the will also changes the balance of power, by removing the villain from the inheritance and leaving her with nothing. The house of Santa Rainha, symbol of power and status, now passes to Afonso, Francisco and Matilde — and consequently to Vitória, as legal guardian of the children.

Faced with this loss, Carolina reacts immediately, feeling betrayed and with nothing to lose and declares open war to Vitória, willing to do anything to recover what she considers hers.

Vitória moves between two fronts: the struggle for the survival of her children and the emotional labyrinth that connects her to Henrique, who publicly assumes that they are together against her will; and João, the wound that never healed.

== Cast ==
=== Main ===
- Cláudia Vieira as Vitória Silva
  - Vieira also plays Young Vitória, with the AI feature
- Jorge Corrula as João Nobre
  - Corrula also plays Young João, with the AI feature
- Vanessa Giácomo as Isabel Moraes (Nobre)
- José Raposo as Manuel Mendonça (seasons 1-2)
- Luísa Cruz as Carolina Mendonça
- Afonso Pimentel as Sérgio Mendonça
- Joana Santos as Margarida Mendonça
- Vicente Gil as Afonso Silva Mendonça
- Mariana Cardoso as Matilde Silva Mendonça
- Rodrigo Costa as Francisco Silva Mendonça
- Albano Jerónimo as Henrique Mendonça/Javier Ochoa (seasons 2-3; guest season 1)

=== Recurring ===
- Carolina Loureiro as Alice Nobre
- Luís Esparteiro as Rogério Martins (seasons 1-2; guest season 3)
- Sandra Faleiro as Edite Nogueira (seasons 1-2; guest season 3)
- Pedro Laginha as Carlos Durão
- Mariana Pacheco as Gabriela Pintassilgo Martins
- Vítor Silva Costa as Pedro Nogueira
- Cristina Homem de Mello as Gilda Pintassilgo
- Melânia Gomes as Bárbara Pintassilgo Martins
- Rita Salema as Fernanda «Nanda» Rodrigues
- Ana Marta Ferreira as Mafalda Rodrigues
- Gonçalo Almeida as Tiago Rodrigues
- Beatriz Frazão as Lia Nobre
- Ricardo Raposo as Ricardo «Ricky» Martins/Zé da Fonte
- Carla Andrino as Helena «Lena» Brito
- Luciana Abreu as Marina Brito Gameiro
- Jorge Mourato as Duarte Gameiro (seasons 1-2; guest season 3)
- Íris Cañamero as Sara Brito Gameiro
- Vera Kolodzig as Raquel Fialho
- Gonçalo Diniz as Nuno Faria (season 1; guest season 2)
- Afonso Laginha as Guilherme Fialho Faria
- Filipe Matos as Lourenço Paiva
- Luís Lourenço as Rodrigo Brito (seasons 2-3; guest season 1)
- Sara de Castro as Adélia (seasons 2-3; guest season 1)
- Teresa Faria as Tucha Martins (season 3)

=== Guest stars ===
- Virgílio Castelo as António Rodrigues
- Dinarte Branco as Paulo Proença
- Luís Pacheco as Eduardo Paiva (seasons 2-3)
- Félix Lozano as Júlio Ochoa (season 3, additional season 2)
- Brienne Keller as Cristina Ochoa (season 3)
- Camilo Bevilacqua as Roberto Oliveira Pinto (season 3)

== Production ==
In late 2024, the pre-production for the telenovela began. Filming began on 10 April 2025 in SP Televisão studios, with exterior recordings between Vila Nova de Gaia and Alto Minho. Luís Lourenço finished the recordings before the rest of cast on 31 October 2025. Also Vera Kolodzig and Carolina Loureiro finished the recordings before the rest of the cast, on 4 November. The last scenes were filmed in 6 November 2025.

On 17 August 2025, was announced that Disney would collaborate in the production and be broadcast on Disney+ simultaneously with SIC and its streaming platform, OPTO. The partnership introduces a new screening window on Sundays: five episodes premiere in the afternoon, simultaneously on OPTO and Disney+. After the linear broadcast, the episodes are available for 7 days on television operators, 30 days on OPTO and available in full, and exclusively, on Disney+, as weekly releases accumulate on this platform.

== Ratings ==
Season	Episodes	First aired		Last aired		Avg. viewers (points)
Season	Episodes	Date	Viewers (points)	Date	Viewers (points)	Avg. viewers (points)
1	112	September 22, 2025	8.5	February 27, 2026	7.7	7.3 (Note: Based on the audiometric results of the 110 episodes out of 112 broadcast and revealed by GfK.)
2	70	March 2, 2026	7.5	June 5, 2026	6.8	7.8 (Note: Based on the audiometric results of the 70 episodes broadcast and revealed by GfK.)
3	96	June 8, 2026	8.1	October 19, 2026	8.4	7.5 (Note: Based on the audiometric results of the 96 episodes broadcast and revealed by GfK.)

The first episode drew a rating of 8.5 and an audience share of 17.7%, according to consolidated data of GfK. At the second episode, recorded a record of share, with an average audience of 8.5 / 20.0%. On January 12, 2026, the novela broke an audience record by drawing 8.7 of rating and 19.0% of share. On February 23, 2026, with the premiere of Páginas da Vida, the episode of the day was divided into two parts and broke a new record of share in the 2nd part, drawing 7.2 of rating and 21.6% of share. The 1st part, on the other hand, recorded 7.1 / 14.3%, with a peak of 8.0 / 16.3%. The first season ended days later on February 27, drawing 7.7 / 15.8%.

The premiere of the second season drew a rating of 7.5 and a share of 15.5%. Already the last episode of the season drew 6.8 / 14.7%.

The premiere of the third season drew 8.1 rating and 16.9% share. At 17 June 2026, the telenovela broke its own audience record with 10.1 / 20.6%, registering for the first time more than 1 million viewers. The last episode drew 8.4 / 17.4%.
