= Kelly Bailey =

Kelly Bailey may refer to:

- Kelly Bailey (Misfits), a fictional character from the British TV series Misfits
- Kelly Bailey (composer), composer and game designer
- Kelly Bailey (actress) (born 1998), actress and model

== See also ==
- Bailey (surname)
