= Quer o Destino =

- Genre: Telenovela
- Created by: Helena Amaral
- Developed by: Plural Entertainment
- Starring: Sara Barradas; Pedro Teixeira; Pedro Sousa; Filipe Vargas; Isaac Alfaiate
- Opening theme: "Desfado" by Ana Moura
- Country of origin: Portugal
- Original language: Portuguese
- No. of episodes: 182 (189 International Version)

Original release
- Network: TVI
- Release: March 23 – October 26, 2020

Related
- Prisioneira; Bem me Quer; Amanda

Quer o Destino (English title: Destiny) is a Portuguese telenovela broadcast and produced by TVI. It is written by and adapted from the Chilean telenovela Amanda. The telenovela premiered on March 23, 2020 and ended on October 26, 2020.

== Plot ==
«Quer o Destino» is a very Portuguese soap opera and possibly familiar to many who know the secrets that were buried in the estates of wealthy families in ancient Portugal.

Margarida Rosa (Sara Barradas), in her teens, after being raped and watching her own father's murder, the innocent young woman ran away from the fear of being, herself, killed in the silence of Ribatejo.

Now, transformed into a woman in arms, with the name of Vitória Santareno, she decides to leave the capital and return to her origins. The goal? Take revenge on the family of your rapists.

Along the way, there is love and lack of love, there are lessons to overcome and many mirrors of the intrinsic human evil. Vitória will do many objectionable things but, despite having chosen a winding route, she proves to be able to overcome traumas, fears and enemies in the flesh.

== Cast ==
=== Main ===
- Sara Barradas as Margarida Rosa / Vitória Santareno
- Pedro Sousa as Mateus Costa de Santa Cruz
- Pedro Teixeira as Marcos Costa de Santa Cruz
- Filipe Vargas as Lucas Costa de Santa Cruz
- Isaac Alfaiate as João Costa de Santa Cruz

=== Secondary ===
- Ana Sofia Martins as Carla Isabel Silva
- João Vicente as Carlos Paulo Branco Reis
- Maya Booth as Rita Paiva do Amaral
- Mafalda Marafusta as Maria Isabel Romão
- Inês Herédia as Isabela Fonseca dos Santos
- Leonor Seixas as Patrícia Fontes
- Marta Faial as Sandra Isabel Silva
- Rodrigo Paganelli as Hugo Paulo Branco Reis
- Madalena Aragão as Ana Catarina Santa Cruz
- Diogo Lopes
- Luís Henrique as Diogo Santa Cruz
- Maria Marques as Pilar Santa Cruz

=== Guest stars ===
- Ana Bustorff as Elvira de Jesus Fonseca dos Santos
- Luís Esparteiro as Alfredo Paulo Reis
- Marina Mota as Joana Branco Reis
- Maria José Paschoal as Catarina Costa de Santa Cruz

== Awards and nominations ==
Year	Award	Category	Result	Ref.
2021	International Emmy Award	Best Telenovela	Nominated	
