= Lourenço Ortigão =

Portuguese film and television actor (born 1989)

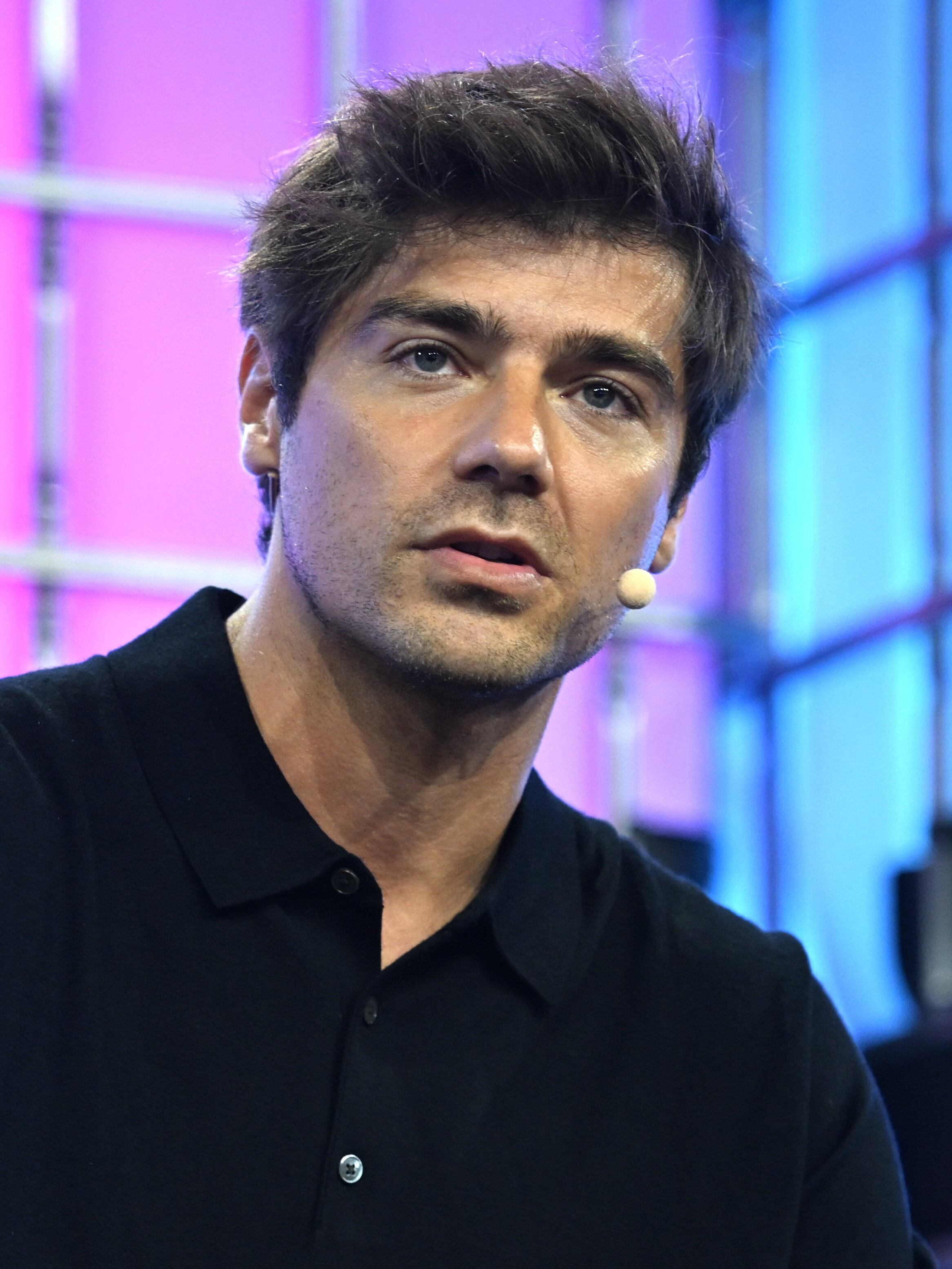
- Ortigão in 2025
- Born: Lourenço Osório de Aragão Ortigão Pinto; 9 August 1989 (age 36); Lisbon, Portugal
- Occupation: Actor
- Years active: 2009–present
- Spouse: Kelly Bailey (m. 2017)
- Children: 1

Lourenço Osório de Aragão Ortigão Pinto (born 9 August 1989), known as Lourenço Ortigão, is a Portuguese actor.

== Career ==
In his television career, Ortigão made his debut in 2009 in the seventh season of Morangos com Açúcar. This was followed, from 2011, by his involvement in the cast of the telenovela Remédio Santo.

Alongside his television work, his film debut came with Morangos com Açúcar - O Filme in 2012.

He was part of the cast of the telenovels Doida por Ti (2012–2014) and Belmonte (2013–2014).

In 2014, he was a contestant and won the second season of the television dance competition Dança com as Estrelas, from TVI channel.

In 2015, Ortigão appeared as the lead in the TVI telenovela A Única Mulher. Also in 2015, he was invited by the International Academy of Television Arts & Sciences to present an award category at the International Emmy Awards.

Ortigão featured on the cover of the September 2015 issue of Men's Health magazine, and returned for a second cover in March 2021. He was additionally on the cover of the Portuguese edition of GQ in June 2016 and in the July/August 2019 issue.

In 2017, he joined the main cast of A Herdeira and appeared in the film Perdidos.

In 2018, Ortigão became an ambassador for Oriflame.

In 2019, he starred in the telenovela Prisioneira. In 2021, he took part in the RTP series Até Que a Vida Nos Separe, marking his first television project outside TVI. That same year, he filmed the television adaptation of the period drama A Rainha e a Bastarda, which was broadcast by RTP in 2022.

Ortigão was one of the actors selected for the 2021 edition of the Passaporte project, an initiative by the Portuguese Cinema Academy aimed at promoting the internationalisation of Portuguese actors.

In July 2021, he left TVI, and in August 2021 joined SIC, becoming part of the channel's entertainment division. His first project for the channel was O Clube, for the OPTO streaming platform.

In 2022, he starred in the SIC telenovela Por Ti. That same year, he joined the cast of the RTP1 series Pôr do Sol. He took a break from telenovelas following the birth of his son, returning in 2024 to A Promessa (SIC) in the role of the villain Tomás Fontes Morais.

In 2023, he won the first season of the SIC programme Hell's Kitchen - Famosos.

== Personal life ==
In December 2016, Ortigão opened a restaurant, Villa Saboia, in Estoril. He also launched the digital recipe platform "Enjoy Cooking", in partnership with the Pescanova brand.

From 2010 to 2014, he was in a relationship with actress Sara Matos, with whom he co-starred in Morangos com Açúcar (Season 7).

Since late 2017, he has been in a relationship with the Portuguese-British actress and model Kelly Bailey. The couple have a son, born on 9 July 2023.

== Filmography ==
=== TV ===
Year	Title	Role	Notes	Channel
2009-2010	Morangos com Açúcar	Rui Oliveira	Protagonista	TVI
2011-2012	Remédio Santo	Miguel Coelho Borges	Main Cast	TVI
2012-2013	Doida por Ti	Alberto Lopes	Main Cast	TVI
2013-2014	Belmonte (TV series)	Lucas Belmonte	Co-Protagonist	TVI
2014	Dança com as Estrelas II	Himself	Participant	TVI
2015-2017	A Única Mulher	Luís Miguel Sacramento	Protagonist	TVI
2017-2018	A Herdeira	Vicente Villalobos	Protagonist	TVI
2019	Juntos em Festa	Himself	Presenter	TVI
2019-2020	Prisionera	Fredy Cruz	Antagonist	TVI
2024-2025	A Promessa	Tomás Fontes Morais	Protagonist	SIC

=== Cinema ===
Year	Movie	Role	Ref.
2012	Morangos com Açúcar - O Filme	Rui Oliveira	
2017	Perdidos	Vasco	
