= A Teia =

- Genre: Romance, Adventure, Drama, Crime
- Created by: André Ramalho
- Developed by: Plural Entertainment
- Starring: Diogo Morgado; Mafalda Marafusta; Joana Ribeiro (see more)
- Opening theme: Believer by Imagine Dragons
- Ending theme: Believer by Imagine Dragons
- Country of origin: Portugal
- Original language: Portuguese
- No. of seasons: 2
- No. of episodes: 175

Production
- Running time: 55min

Original release
- Network: TVI
- Release: November 19, 2018 – June 17, 2019

A Teia (English: The Web) is a Portuguese telenovela. It was produced and broadcast by TVI. It was written by André Ramalho. The telenovela premiered on November 19, 2018 and ended on June 17, 2019. It is recorded between Portugal (Porto) and Scotland (Edimburgo).

== Plot ==
In Porto, Margarida receives a message on her cell phone that makes her terrified. Without saying anything to her family or her husband, she is in secret with Antonio, whom he had not contacted for many years.

Days later, the two assault a bank using a collar-bomb to complete the coup. An absurdity, a madness that does not fit at all in the profile of each one.

=== Season 1 ===
In the Scottish Highlands, Lara Seixas (daughter of António) is a young girl from Port-au-Prince who is apprenticed to a law firm in Edinburgh.

The father inherited a desire for justice. His dream is to be a public prosecutor. Simão Rosa Neto (son of Margarida) also lives in Scotland but is far from building a successful career.

After a violent confrontation with his father (Augusto), with whom he has a difficult relationship, Simão is expelled from home and emigrates. Without resources and on the margins of everything and everyone, he plunges into an underworld of illegal struggles to subsist in a strange country.

But motivation never failed him, especially to support Inês, born of a tumultuous relationship with Mónica, who abandoned her daughter to Simão's care.

Simao is unjustly accused of ill-treatment and the child delivered to welfare services.

Lara, a perfect unknown, extends her hand and, from a cruel situation, a strong bond and unforeseen passion is born. Their connection is abruptly interrupted by terrible news: the death of their parents in shocking circumstances. Bewitched by mourning and when they least expected it, the two meet again at Porto, at the funeral of their parents.

Lara and Simão discover that their parents mysteriously died together. As they learn more Lara and Simão they move more and more into opposing camps.

The two parents were only the first victims of a sinister plan that seems to come from a sick mind, someone who takes advantage of individual weaknesses for obscure purposes.

Other deaths follow, all victims receiving a premonitory message.

Among the chosen, no one knows who will die next, though they all hide a bond that unites them.

Lara and Simão become involved in a succession of crimes whose true cause is never what it seems.

=== Season 2 ===
Simão and Lara survive an airplane explosion.

Mário rebukes Jaime and says he could not jeopardize his daughter's life. Jaime enters his office and picks up the box with his personal belongings and leaves. Cláudia and Tiago decide to give the wedding another chance.

Lara remains intrigued by the motives that led Diana to murder all those people and Simon looks away compromised, saying that it is time to care more about their lives.

At the hospital, Lara and Humberto hug each other happy, knowing that Liliana will be discharged.

Humberto tries to convince Valdemar to go to the marriage of Augusto by a matter of dignity. Valdemar is sensitized by his son's words.

Freitas blackmails Augusto, if he will not tell Valdemar that Augusto, once again, deceived him into the game.

Augusto and Isaura marry. Augusto makes a speech about Simão, making it known that he will also be part of the direction of the Warehouses. Jaime enters the car and Ricardo tries to calm him down.

Augusto asks Valdemar if he has anything to say. Before everyone, Lara's grandfather insists that Simão's father played always clean and that he a gambling addict.

Isaura tells Jaime and Cecília that she was questioned by the PJ and had to admit that Augusto was abusing Inês.

Valdemar is preparing to go to the funeral of Augusto. He tells Humberto that Simão and Jaime's father may have many faults, but he was not a pedophile.

Matilde wants to know if the father believes in grandpa's innocence and Jaime forbids the family to go to the funeral.

The funeral car with the body of Augustus advances and only Valdemar is present. Jaime watches from afar.

João Maria informs the family that helped Liliana to recover the paternity test.

Liliana reveals to Humberto that he is her biological father and they are both happy. Valdemar hears but does not manifest and comments with Reuben that the death of Augusto laid him down.

Vera informs Simão and Lara that Isaura made a statement against Simão about the death of Augusto.

Isaura says that he saw Simão beaten by Augusto, but eventually he left in fear, not imagining that he could kill his father.

Simão insists that he has nothing to do with the death of his father and Lara tries to calm him.

Mónica tries to comfort Inês, who denies that her grandfather touched her and says it's all lies.

Jaime and Isaura say that everything is going as planned. Simão goes to meet them and asks Isaura why he incriminated him.

Lara treats Simão who is angry about the accusations that he is a target. Lara asks Simão to be honest with her and he pushes her, leaving Lara hurt. Lara gets a message from Julie that says she likes to see her and she calls him.

== Cast ==
- Diogo Morgado - Simão Rosa Neto (Protagonist)
- Mafalda Marafusta - Lara Seixas (Protagonist)
- Joana Ribeiro - Diana Figueiredo (Antagonist)
- Miguel Guilherme - Augusto Rosa Neto
- Luís Esparteiro - Valdemar Seixas
- São José Correia - Isaura Seixas
- Sofia Ribeiro - Cecília Rosa Neto
- Carloto Cotta - Jaime Rosa Neto
- Patrícia Tavares - Dalila Seixas
- Pedro Teixeira - Humberto Seixas
- Julie Sergeant - Elvira Coelho
- Vitor Hugo - Ricardo Saavedra
- Marta Faial - Mónica Vieira
- Rui Santos - Paulo Cardoso
- Margarida Moreira - Joana Cardoso
- Filipe Vargas - Tiago Messias
- Madalena Brandão - Cláudia Messias
- Maria João Pinho - Vera Cardoso
- Sofia Baessa - Mayra da Silva
- Fernando Pires - Domingos Pêra
- Júlia Palha - Renata Santos
- Rodrigo Trindade - Bruno Lobão
- Rodrigo Tomás - Maximiliano «Max» Fontes
- Margarida Serrano - Inês Vieira
- Gabriela Mirza - Flor
- Matilde Serrão - Maria Messias
- Rafael Ferreira - João Maria Rosa Neto
- Beatriz Leonardo - Matilde Rosa Neto
- Inês Custódio - Patrícia Cardoso
- Miguel Cruz - Gonçalo Cardoso
- Francisco Grilo - Rúben Seixas
- Inês Ramos - Liliana Seixas
- Anamar - Margarida Rosa Neto (Guest)
- Pedro Carmo - António Seixas (Guest)
- Eunice Muñoz - Hermínia Candeias (Guest)
