= José Condessa =

Portuguese actor (born 1997)

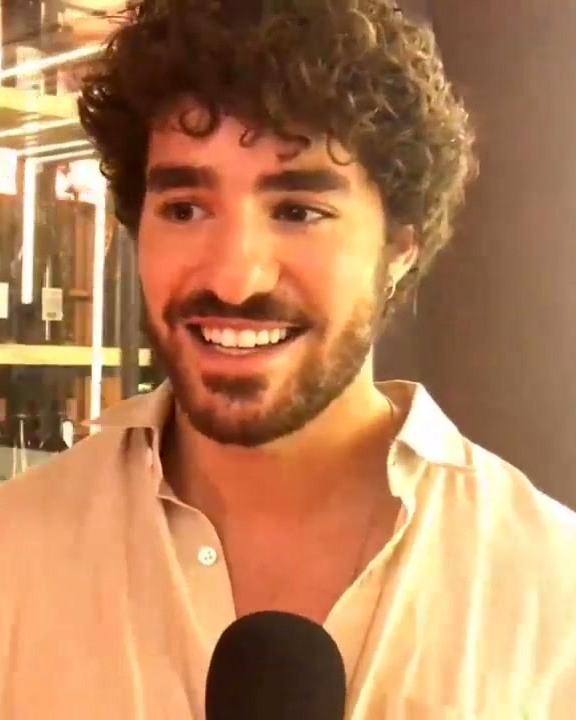
- José in 2020
- Born: José Jorge Esteves Condessa; June 6, 1997 (age 29); Lisbon, Portugal
- Occupation: Actor
- Years active: 2014–present

José Jorge Esteves Condessa (born 6 June 1997), professionally known as José Condessa or Zé Condessa is a Portuguese actor from Lisbon. He is known for his role in the Netflix series, Turn of the Tide (2023).

== Early life and career ==
Condessa was born and raised in Lisbon, Portugal. He started his acting career in local amateur theatre at the Academia de Santo Amaro. He attended the Escola Profissional de Teatro de Cascais and made his theatre debut with the Companhia do Teatro Experimental de Cascais. Condessa first featured in 2014 as Rafael in the soap opera, Jardins Proibidos.

== Personal life ==
He's a Benfica fan and a friend of footballer Ruben Dias.

== Filmography ==
=== TV ===
Year	Show	Role	Notes	Channel
2014 - 2015	Jardins Proibidos	Rafael José Silva (Rafa)	Protagonist	TVI
2015 - 2016	Santa Bárbara	Luís Fernandes	Protagonist	TVI
2016 - 2017	Rainha das Flores	Tiago Piedade	Co- Protagonist	SIC
2017	Filha da Lei	Flávio	Guest Star	RTP1
2017	Ministério do Tempo	Sancho	Guest Star	RTP1
2017 - 2018	Espelho d'Água	Vítor Gama	Protagonist	SIC
2017 - 2019	Cenas de Família	Pedro	—N/a	FOX
2017 - 2018	A Herdeira	Salvador	Main Cast	TVI
2018 - 2019	Valor da Vida	Bruno Vasconcelos	Main Cast	TVI
2018 - 2019	Dança com as Estrelas 4	Ele Próprio	Winner	TVI
2020	Salve-se Quem Puder	Juan de La Piedra	Co- Protagonist	Rede Globo
2020 - 2021	Bem Me Quer	David Quintela Trindade de Sousa	Protagonist	TVI
2021	Até que a Vida Nos Separe	Joaquim 20's	Main cast	RTP1
2021	Pôr do Sol	António	Guest Star	RTP1
2021	O Crime do Padre Amaro	Padre Amaro	Protagonist	RTP1
2023	Lúcia, a Guardiã do Segredo	Francisco Andrade	Guest Star	OPTO
2024	Cacau	Tiago Saavedra	Protagonist	TVI
2024	A Filha		Protagonist	TVI
2026	The Final Problem	Tony	Supporting	Netflix

=== Cinema ===
Year	Film	Role
2016	A Mãe É que Sabe	Ana Luísa's boyfriend
2018	A Barriga da Mariana	Francisco
2018	Gabriel	Rui
2020	O Som Que Desce na Terra	Domingos Bento
2020	O Tesouro	Egas
2025	Honeyjoon	João

=== Streaming ===
Year	Serie	Role	Notes	Streaming Service
2023	Rabo de Peixe/ Turn of the Tide	Eduardo Melo	Main Character	Netflix
