= Turn of the Tide =

Turn of the Tide may refer to:

- Turn of the Tide (film), 1935 British film
- Turn of the Tide (TV series), 2023 Portuguese TV show

== See also ==
- The Turn of the Tide, an episode of Ninjago
- Turn of the Tides, 1994 album by Tangerine Dream
