= Filippo Fiumani =

Italian visual artist

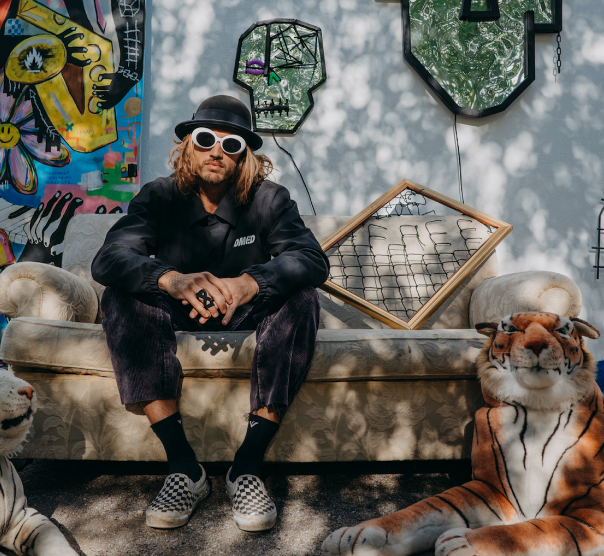
- Born: Loreto, Italy
- Style: neo expressionism, fine art, trash art. street art, digital art
- Website: www.fiumani.it

Filippo Fiumani (b. 1987) is an Italian artist, author and actor.

His work involves the combination of technology repurposed materials to create installations and fine-art pieces.

== Art practice and themes ==
Fiumani's work is multidisciplinary, including painting, photography, video, and digital art. His pieces often engage with themes of structure and disorder, consumerism, nature and technology.

Working across sculpture, painting and installation, his multidisciplinary practice explores the friction between environmental decay, digital technology, human emotion, and urban chaos.

His paintings feature vibrant colors, chaotic brushstrokes, while his sculptures use neon lights, trash and deconstructed words to challenge traditional meanings. His work often engages with digital and recycled materials, reflecting on the relationship between technology, over-consumerism, and identity.

His practice extends to product design, such as "Le Mani" a pen designed for blind people in 2014.

Fiumani has participated in artist residencies in Italy and in the United States (Memorie Urbane, Gaeta, 2022, Hustler Building, Los Angeles, 2024).

He has held solo exhibitions at Underdogs Gallery, Lisbon (2021), Songword Art Gallery (2024), LA, USA, and at Galleria Nicolau Nasoni, Porto (2026).

He has also taken part in group exhibitions with Acid Gallery, Lille, France; Zclub Gallery, Mexico City, Mexico; Cordoaria, Art Expo, Lisboa; Boom Festival, Portugal; Wheels and Waves, Biarritz, France; One Root, Paris, France; Wuum Gallery, Los Angeles, USA.

Fiumani has furthermore been invited to collaborate on artistic intervention projects such as Futurama, Serpa and Alvito, Portugal (2023–26); Kalorama Festival with Underdogs Gallery, Lisbon (2022); Iminente Festival, Lisbon (2023); Soul on the moon, Sandeman Foundation, Quinta do seixo (2022);

In 2026, Filippo Fiumani collaborated with MAAT (Museum of Art, Architecture and Technology) Lisbon, as part of “Life is the Game” , an immersive mixed reality experience conceived and directed by Paulo Furtado ( The Legendary Tigerman). The collaboration brought Fiumani’s Words/Sword book into the environment trough a selection of his anagrams and designs.

== Acting ==
He has appeared as an actor, playing "Gianluca" an Italian Mafioso on Turn of the Tide on Netflix.

He has been playing other characters on the following projects:

Belmonte, Tv series 2014; Agua de Mar, Tv series 2015; Star Sailors TV mini series 2025; A protegida, Tv series 2025.

== Other activities ==
Fiumani supports Sea Shepard, a non-profit marine conservation organization that uses direct action tactics to achieve its goals.
