= A Herdeira =

2017 Portuguese telenovela

- "O Bem tem um Preço, o Mal tem uma História" (Portuguese) "Good has a Price, Evil has a History" (English)
- Genre: Romance, Melodrama, Adventure
- Created by: Maria João Mira
- Developed by: Plural Entertainment
- Directed by: António Borges Correia
- Starring: Kelly Bailey; Rita Pereira; Lourenço Ortigão; Pedro Barroso (see more)
- Opening theme: Despacito by Luis Fonsi and Daddy Yankee
- Ending theme: Despacito by Luis Fonsi and Daddy Yankee
- Country of origin: Portugal
- Original language: Portuguese
- No. of seasons: 2
- No. of episodes: 314

Production
- Running time: 55min

Original release
- Network: TVI
- Release: September 24, 2017 – September 29, 2018

A Herdeira (English: The Gypsy Heiress) is a Portuguese telenovela broadcast and produced by TVI. It is written by Maria João Mira. The telenovela premiered on September 24, 2017, and ended on September 29, 2018. It is recorded between Portugal, Galiza and Mexico.

== Plot ==
Luz (whose birth name is Benedita) was abandoned in a river by her stepmother when she was a baby, and was found by a couple of gypsies who adopted her. Nobody ever knew her stepmother abandoned her, not even her husband. 20 years later, she lives with her adoptive father in Mexico and doesn't know she was adopted, while her real father tries everything to find her; He will go to Mexico after receiving information about a woman who can help him finding Luz, and will even meet her several times in Mexico and in Portugal as well, without even knowing that she's his daughter. Luz's return to Portugal will cause a sequel of twists and turns and many conflicts with those who are against her as well.

== Seasons ==
Season	Episodes	Originally released	
Season	Episodes	First released	Last released
1	121	September 24, 2017	February 11, 2018
2	193	February 12, 2018	September 29, 2018

== Cast ==
Actor/Actress	Role
Kelly Bailey	Luz Fuentes/Benedita Alvarenga
Rita Pereira	Madalena Alvarenga
Lourenço Ortigão	Vicente Villalobos
Pedro Barroso	Roni Raña
Joaquim Horta	Ramón Fuentes
Pedro Lamares	Duarte Alvarenga
Sofia Ribeiro	Soraya Fuentes
Miguel Guilherme	Sancho Villalobos
Paulo Pires	Joaquim Villalobos
Rita Ribeiro	Amélia Alves
Jessica Athayde	Alexa Torres/Maria Luísa Alvarenga
Mafalda Marafusta	Beatriz Rivera
José Wallenstein	Zé Avelino Videira
Gabriela Mirza	Rita Alvarenga Viegas
Marisa Cruz	Goreti Torres
Maya Booth	Marta Alvarenga Viegas
Rita Bakker	Maria Torres
Helena Costa	Lupe Romero
Pedro Granger	Dinis Videira
Ricardo Trêpa	João Domingos
Júlia Palha	Carlota Alvarenga
Leonardo Marques	Pipo Alvarenga
Vitor Hugo	Diego Ventura
Julie Sergeant	Marianinha Videira
Gany Ferreira	Vitó Carlos Bagina
Melânia Gomes	Tina Barbosa
Pedro Hossi	Javiar Tiburón González
Rodrigo Trindade	Ivan Raña
Isabela Valadeiro	Safira Monteiro
Gonçalo Diniz	Manuel Araújo
Filipa Pinto	Candy Sofia Pereira
Carolina Frias	Anita Videira
Filipe Vargas	Bernardo Viegas
Madalena Almeida	Joana Alvarenga Viegas
Alexandre Jorge	Hugo Alvarenga Viegas
Sofia Baessa	Lola Solimões
Matilde Breyner	Leonor Domingues
Daniela Melchior	Ariana Franco/Marcella Rivera Gusmano
José Condessa	Salvador
André Gago	Henrique
Lia Gama	Maria do Carmo Alvarenga
