= Cláudia Vieira =

Portuguese actress, model and television presenter

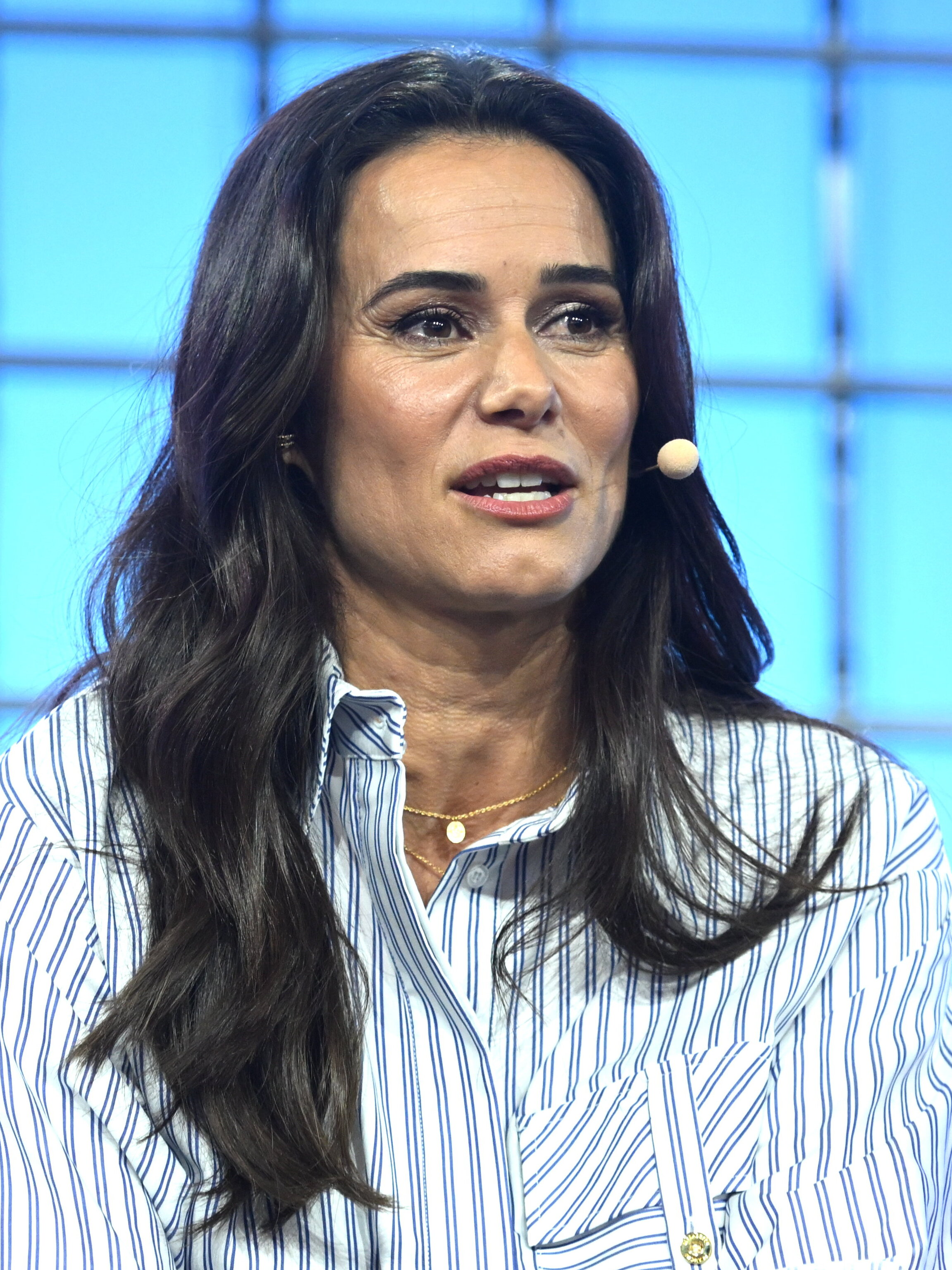
- Vieira in 2025
- Born: Cláudia Patrícia Figueira Vieira; 20 June 1978 (age 47); Loures, Portugal
- Occupations: Actress, model, television presenter
- Years active: 2005–present
- Partner(s): Pedro Teixeira (2005–14); João Alves (2014-present)
- Children: 2

Cláudia Patrícia Figueira Vieira (born 20 June 1978) is a Portuguese actress, model and television presenter.

As a model, she has appeared on the Portuguese magazine covers of FHM and GQ. Vieira has also appeared regularly in the Portuguese advertisement for French car manufacturer Renault.

== Career ==
=== 2004–2009: Breakthrough ===
Vieira's first acting role was a minor role on comedy series Maré Alta where she appeared in the show for 16 episodes.

Following her minor role in Maré Alta, Vieira received her first major lead role where she played the character of Ana Luísa Rochinha in season two of Morangos com Açúcar.

Vieira made her feature film debut in the Portuguese thriller Contrato, where she played a character called Júlia.

=== 2009–present: Ídolos and return to Telenovelas ===
Following the end of the second season of Ídolos, Vieira was announced as the new presenter for the third season of the talent show alongside João Manzarra, on the 10 August 2009. This would mark the first time that Vieira would present a television show.

In 2011, after a four-year hiatus from telenovelas, Vieira returned on soap opera Rosa Fogo where she played the character of Maria Azevedo Mayer.

After three seasons as the presenter of Ídolos, the show was cancelled as a result of SIC commissioning the Portuguese version of The X Factor in September 2013.

As of 2013, Vieira is playing the lead role in soap opera Sol de Inverno where she plays the character Andreia.

== Personal life ==
Vieira met actor Pedro Teixeira in the summer of 2004, whilst filming on the set of the second season of Morangos com Açúcar.

On 23 October 2009, Vieira and Teixeira announced that she was pregnant with the couple's first child, a girl. Vieira gave birth to her daughter with Teixeira, named Maria, on 5 April 2010 at the Hospital da Luz in Lisbon.

She gave birth to a second girl named Caetana on 1 December 2019. The father is her current boyfriend and businessman João Alves.

== Filmography ==
=== Film ===
Year	Title	Role	Notes
2009	Contrato	Júlia	
2009	Second Life	Cláudia	
2010	Dores e Amores	Bel	

=== Television ===
Year	Title	Role	Notes
2004–2005	Maré Alta	Ship Passenger	16 episodes
2004–2005	Morangos com Açúcar	Ana Luísa Rochinha	339 episodes
2006	Fala-me de Amor	Danny Foster	213 episodes
2007	Ilha dos Amores	Vera Medeiros	198 episodes
2008	Podia Acabar o Mundo	Vitória Del Pilar	1 episode
2009	A Vida Privada de Salazar	Sofia	2 episodes
2011	Gosto Disto	Bond Girl	1 episode
2011–2012	Rosa Fogo	Maria Azevedo Mayer	226 episodes
2013–	Sol de Inverno	Andreia	60 episodes
2015–2016	Coração d'Ouro	Laura Mendonça	326 episodes
2022	Cantor ou Impostor?	Herself (host)	6 episodes
2024–2025	Senhora do Mar	Francisca Medeiros	312 episodes
2025–present	Vitória	Vitória Silva Medonça	TBA

=== Theatre ===
Year	Title	Role	Notes
2009	Saia Curta e Consequência		
