= Morangos com Açúcar – O Filme =

- Directed by: Hugo de Sousa
- Based on: Morangos com Açúcar
- Produced by: TVI / Plural Entertainment
- Starring: Lia Carvalho; Lourenço Ortigão; Mafalda Portela; Ricardo Sá; Sara Matos; Sara Prata
- Release date: 30 August 2012 (Portugal)
- Running time: 142 minutes
- Country: Portugal
- Language: Portuguese
- Box office: €1,207,647.10

Morangos com Açúcar – O Filme (lit. "Morangos Com Açúcar – The Movie") is a 2012 Portuguese teen film, directed by Hugo de Sousa and based on the TV series with the same name. It stars Sara Matos, Lourenço Ortigão and others.

== Plot ==
The story takes place on a summer camp in Portugal where old friends find each other one more time to participate in a bands competition. Margarida and Rui, a couple, met a famous singer named Tatiana who is starting her career in Portugal, they developed their friendship until Tatiana falls in love with Rui, making Margarida give up on the competition.

== Cast ==
=== Main cast ===
- Sara Matos as Margarida
- Lourenço Ortigão as Rui
- Mafalda Portela as Missy M
- Ricardo Sá as Leo
- Sara Prata as Becas
- Gabriela Barros as Marta
- Lia Carvalho as Mariana
- Carolina Frias as Alice
- Filipa Areosa as Ana Rita
- David Carreira as Lourenço
- Catarina Siqueira as Anabela
- Diogo Branco as Gil
- João Secundino as Kiko
- Pedro Macedo as Tozé
- Tiago Costa as Ricardo
- João Maria Bonneville as Sebastião
- Inês Seco as Lili
- João Pcheco as Fred

=== Recurring cast ===
- Diogo Lemos as André
- Isaac Alfaiate as André
- Carlos Cunha as Diamantino
- Luke D'Eça as Ed
- Miguel Santiago as Fábio
- Ivo Lucas as Gonçalo
- Bruno Simões as Jorge
- Francisco Borges as Jota
- Nélson Patrão as Link
- Tiago Carreira as Lourenço
- Maria Henrique as Maria
- Joana Duarte as Matilde
- Jéssica Athayde as Mimi
- Helena Costa as Mónica
- Mafalda Teixeira as Patrícia
- João Catarré as Pipo
- Pedro Carvalho as Ricardo
- Guilherme Filipe as Rogério Sapinho
- David Gama as Sérgio
- Pedro Teixeira as Simão
- Rita Pereira as Soraia
- Luís Lourenço as Tiago
- Vítor Fonseca as Zé Milho

== Reception ==
As of 11 November 2012, the film had a box office gross of €1,207,647.10.
