= Turn of the Tide (TV series) =

Portuguese drama series

- Portuguese: Rabo de Peixe
- Genre: Thriller, Drama
- Created by: Augusto Fraga
- Written by: Augusto Fraga; Hugo Gonçalves; João Tordo; Filipa Amaro; Francisco Afonso Lopes
- Directed by: Augusto Fraga; Patrícia Sequeira; João Maia
- Starring: José Condessa; Helena Caldeira; André Leitão; Rodrigo Tomás; Maria João Bastos; Albano Jerónimo; Rafael Morais; Afonso Pimentel; Kelly Bailey; Pêpê Rapazote; Francesco Acquaroli; Adriano Carvalho; Marcantonio Del Carlo; Paolla Oliveira; Caio Blat
- Composers: Pedro Marques, Pedro Macedo Camacho (opening main theme)
- Country of origin: Portugal
- Original languages: Portuguese; English; Italian
- No. of seasons: 3
- No. of episodes: 19

Production
- Executive producers: Pandora da Cunha Telles; Augusto Fraga; Pablo Iraola
- Producers: Pandora da Cunha Telles; Augusto Fraga; Pablo Iraola
- Cinematography: André Szankowski
- Editors: Marcos Castiel BFE; Pedro Ribeiro
- Camera setup: Single-camera
- Running time: 41–51 minutes
- Production company: UKBAR Filmes

Original release
- Network: Netflix
- Release: 26 May 2023 – present

Turn of the Tide (Portuguese: Rabo de Peixe, [ˈʁa.βu d(ɨ) ˈpɐj.ʃ(ɨ)], lit. 'Fish Tail') is a Portuguese drama television series based on a true story, created by Augusto Fraga. It follows Eduardo, a young fisherman, and his friends who find a boat full of cocaine washed up on the shore in the Azorean village of Rabo de Peixe in São Miguel Island. They decide to sell the drug, but soon they face the wrath of the drug lord who owns it, the police who are after it, and a series of unpredictable events that put their lives at risk.

Premiered on May 26, 2023, on the streaming platform Netflix, the series reached 10th on Netflix's world top views on May 29, 2023 and 7th on May 30, 2023, being in the Top 10 in 33 countries. The show was renewed for a second season in July 2023 and renewed for a third in October 2024.

== Synopsis ==
The story takes place in the Azorean village of Rabo de Peixe, when a ton of cocaine comes ashore, completely changing the lives of the inhabitants. Eduardo, a young fisherman, and his friends start selling the cocaine. But, a ton of cocaine does not go unnoticed and our protagonists will face the owners of this drug, the police and a series of unpredictable characters in a dangerous adventure with no return.

== Connection to real-world events ==
The TV series is loosely based on a true story. In 2001, a large quantity of cocaine was found in Rabo de Peixe after a 14-meter-long Sun Kiss 47 sailboat used by cocaine traffickers suffered a broken rudder off the Azorean coast in June, carrying more than 500 kilograms of cocaine with a purity of more than 80%, worth over 150 million euros at 2023's prices.

The captain of the boat dumped the cocaine sealed in rubber packages placed in nets weighed down with anchors off the coast of the island of São Miguel, so he could take the yacht to a harbour to be repaired without arousing suspicion. However, a storm dislodged the underwater cocaine stashes and the packages began to wash up on the shore of the island.

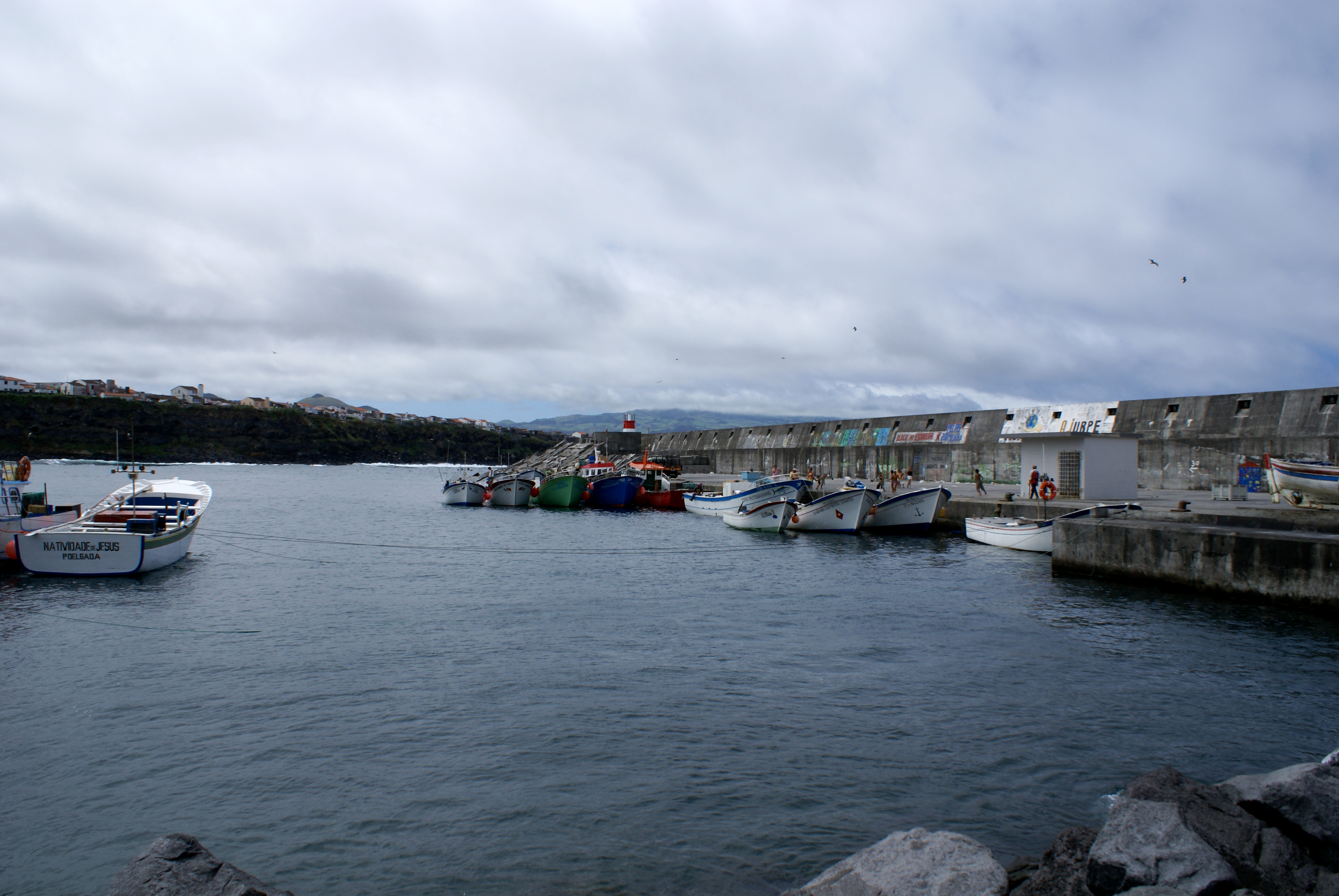
Partial view of the Port of Rabo de Peixe

Many villagers decided to try the drug. As they were not used to it and the cocaine was very pure, a significant number of people ended up in the hospital with an overdose, and some even died. Still others were selling the product for a bargain price of 25 euros per full glass of beer. Years after the incident, many inhabitants of Rabo de Peixe still remained addicted.

== Cast ==
=== Main ===
- José Condessa as Eduardo Melo
- Helena Caldeira as Sílvia Arruda
- André Leitão as Carlos / Carlinhos
- Rodrigo Tomás as Rafael Medeiros
- Maria João Bastos as the Inspector Paula Frias
- Albano Jerónimo as Arruda
- Afonso Pimentel as Ian
- Kelly Bailey as Bruna
- Pêpê Rapazote as Uncle Joe
- Francesco Acquaroli as Monti
- Adriano Carvalho as Jeremias
- Marcantonio Del Carlo as Francesco Bonino
- Paolla Oliveira as Ofélia
- Caio Blat as Fagner

=== Recurring ===
- Dinarte de Freitas as Zé do Frango
- Filippo Fiumani as Gianluca
- Salvador Martinha as Francisco
- João Pedro Vaz as Banha
- Luísa Cruz as Valentina
- David Medeiros as Lavrador
- Miguel Damião as Father António
- Benedita Pereira as Elvira
- Romeu Bairos as Sandro G
- Rafael Morais as Morcela
- José Medeiros as Prisoner
- Daniela Ruah as Fátima
- Victória Guerra as Cristina Brum
- Madalena Aragão as Mariana
- Joaquim de Almeida as João Canto Moniz
- Tomás Furtado de Melo as Police Officer #1
- Keven Santos as Police Officer #2
- Luís Henrique Matos as Marcelino
- Frederico Amaral as Ferrugem
- Maria João Falcão as Gisela
- Ana Lopes as the Reporter
- Nelson Cabral as the Hotel Clerk

== Episodes ==
Series overview
Series	Episodes	Originally released
1	7	26 May 2023
2	6	17 October 2025
3	6	10 April 2026

=== Season 1 (2023) ===
No. overall	No. in season	Title	Directed by	Written by	Original release date
1	1	"Tempestade" "Storm"	Augusto Fraga	Augusto Fraga, Hugo Gonçalves and João Tordo	26 May 2023
2	2	"Lei da Oferta e da Procura" "Supply and Demand"	Augusto Fraga	Augusto Fraga, Hugo Gonçalves and João Tordo	26 May 2023
3	3	"Terra Treme" "Earth Shakes"	Patrícia Sequeira	Augusto Fraga, Hugo Gonçalves and João Tordo	26 May 2023
4	4	"Pela Boca Morre o Peixe" "Loose Lips"	Patrícia Sequeira	Augusto Fraga, Hugo Gonçalves and João Tordo	26 May 2023
5	5	"Ninguém Foge de uma Ilha" "No One Escapes From an Island"	Augusto Fraga	Augusto Fraga, Hugo Gonçalves and João Tordo	26 May 2023
6	6	"O Canto do Cisne" "The Swan Song"	Patrícia Sequeira	Augusto Fraga, Hugo Gonçalves and João Tordo	26 May 2023
7	7	"Isto Não é a América" "This Is Not America"	Augusto Fraga	Augusto Fraga, Hugo Gonçalves and João Tordo	26 May 2023

=== Season 2 (2025) ===
No. overall	No. in season	Title	Directed by	Written by	Original release date
8	1	"Lar, Doce Lar" "Home Sweet Home"	Augusto Fraga	Filipa Amaro, Augusto Fraga and Hugo Gonçalves	17 October 2025
9	2	"O Regresso dos Mortos-Vivos" "Return of the Living Dead"	Augusto Fraga	Filipa Amaro, Augusto Fraga and Hugo Gonçalves	17 October 2025
10	3	"Amigos para Sempre" "Forever Friends"	João Maia	Filipa Amaro, Augusto Fraga and Hugo Gonçalves	17 October 2025
11	4	"Peixe Graúdo" "Big Tuna"	João Maia	Filipa Amaro, Augusto Fraga and Hugo Gonçalves	17 October 2025
12	5	"Lançar a Pedra, Esconder a Mão" "Throw a Rock, Hide your Hand"	João Maia	Filipa Amaro, Augusto Fraga and Hugo Gonçalves	17 October 2025
13	6	"Está a Chover Cocaína" "It's Raining Cocaine"	Augusto Fraga	Filipa Amaro, Augusto Fraga and Hugo Gonçalves	17 October 2025

=== Season 3 (2026) ===
No. overall	No. in season	Title	Directed by	Written by	Original release date
14	1	"TBA" "Night Vigilantes"	Augusto Fraga	Filipa Amaro, Augusto Fraga and Francisco Afonso Lopes	10 April 2026
15	2	"TBA" "Lessa's Smile"	Patrícia Sequeira	Filipa Amaro, Augusto Fraga and Francisco Afonso Lopes	10 April 2026
16	3	"TBA" "Shoot 'Em Up"	Augusto Fraga	Filipa Amaro, Augusto Fraga and Francisco Afonso Lopes	10 April 2026
17	4	"TBA" "Every Dog Has His Day"	Patrícia Sequeira	Filipa Amaro, Augusto Fraga and Francisco Afonso Lopes	10 April 2026
18	5	"TBA" "Love"	Patrícia Sequeira	Filipa Amaro, Augusto Fraga and Francisco Afonso Lopes	10 April 2026
19	6	"TBA" "The End of the World"	Augusto Fraga	Filipa Amaro, Augusto Fraga and Francisco Afonso Lopes	10 April 2026
