= Ouro Verde (TV series) =

- Genre: Romance, Melodrama, Revenge
- Created by: Maria João Costa
- Developed by: Plural Entertainment
- Directed by: Hugo de Sousa
- Starring: Diogo Morgado; Joana de Verona; Ana Sofia Martins; Sílvia Pfeifer; Luís Esparteiro (see more)
- Opening theme: I Need This Girl by Virgul
- Ending theme: I Need This Girl by Virgul
- Country of origin: Portugal
- Original language: Portuguese
- No. of episodes: 221

Production
- Running time: 55min

Original release
- Network: TVI
- Release: 8 January – 3 October 2017

Related
- A Única Mulher; A Herdeira

Ouro Verde (English: Payback) is a Portuguese telenovela broadcast and produced by TVI, written by newcomer Maria João Costa. It is filmed in Portugal and Brazil with some scenes also filmed in Madrid.

== Plot ==
=== Season 1 (2017) ===
"Jorge Monforte" (Diogo Morgado) is a Brazilian entrepreneur, owner of the Ouro Verde (Brazil) empire, one of the world leaders in the agricultural market. It has just acquired a significant stake in Banco Brandão Ferreira da Fonseca (BBFF), a family-owned company led by the powerful Portuguese banker "Miguel Ferreira da Fonseca" (Luís Esparteiro), winning a seat on the institution's board of directors. The novelty is not well received in the family of the banker, who suspect the real intentions of that foreigner. Jorge Monforte is the new identity of Zé Maria Magalhães , who was killed 15 years ago and who is now returning to take justice for the death of his family.

João Magalhães (Paulo Pires), his father, was BBFF's chief financial officer when a scandal involving the bank broke out in a complicated scheme of fraud and misappropriation of capital. John is used as a scapegoat when accused of the coup. It begins to be investigated and his name is smeared in the newspapers. To defend himself, "John" threatens "Miguel", assuring that he will denounce all the dirty schemes of the bank if they do not get him out of that situation, and "Miguel" realizes that, alive, he is a time bomb. This results in a murderer being sent to his house to fake a suicide. It turns out that his family, who had already left by chance, surprise the killer and ends up dead, with the exception of Zé Maria who, miraculously, survives.

After six months in a coma, Zé Maria wakes up. But he's very confused about the fateful night. Miguel, on learning of the incident, is apprehensive, afraid that he will remember something that might compromise him and pretends to be worried about the boy. When Zé Maria decides to return to his life, he searches for Miguel to find work and crosses up with the murderer of his family, who does not identify immediately. On that same day, he also encounters Bia Ferreira da Fonseca (Joana de Verona), but does not know that she is the daughter of Miguel. There is love at first sight, but Zé Maria has other concerns because his memory returns, he joins the pieces and realizes that Miguel is the principal of the hateful crime that killed his whole family.

He quickly realizes that he is at risk of life and decides to flee, but not without being almost killed again by the murderer and, by chance of life, be saved by Bia. Zé Maria ends up spending a few days with her, fall in love with each other, until the boy is forced to flee away and leave for Rio de Janeiro. The two suffer greatly from the separation. Already in Brazil, Zé Maria is robbed and is without the contact of Bia , losing it of sight. It is in Rio de Janeiro, in an impetus of courage, that "Zé Maria" ends up saving from a dangerous situation "Januário Cavalcantti" (Gracindo Júnior), an important colonel with vast properties in the Amazonia. This unlikely encounter will change his life, for this man, a few months later, will welcome him and help him by giving him work as a pawn on the farm.

The relationship between the two will grow, and when the colonel dies, Zé Maria , now with a new identity, Jorge Monforte , inherits all the fortune. Years later, more powerful than ever, thanks to the growth of the cattle and soy business, and already with a strong position in the BBFF, Jorge decides that it is time to return to Portugal and settle accounts with the past. Your family has to be avenged. Jorge wants to clear his father's name and do justice for the entire family that has died. He wants to see Miguel Ferreira da Fonseca in misery, with his name obscured in the newspapers. The data are released when "Jorge" is called urgently to one of his farms, where there is a strong environmental protest against the Ouro Verde group. Among the demonstrators, Jorge identifies Bia, now an environmental activist, whom he had not seen for 15 years, supposedly a tidy subject in his life. The heart of Jorge fires upon seeing her and he realizes that that passion is far from finished. Now how will he resolve the fact that she is the daughter of the man he is about to destroy? This is something she can never forgive, because the truth is that if Jorge destroys the Ferreira da Fonseca family in some way he will be doing with Bia the same as The banker did with Jorge in the past.

== Seasons ==
Season	Episodes		Originally released	
Season	Episodes		First released	Last released
1	98	65	January 8, 2017	March 28, 2017
1	98	33	March 29, 2017	May 6, 2017
2	124		May 8, 2017	October 3, 2017

== Cast ==
- Diogo Morgado – José Maria Magalhães (Zé Maria)/Jorge Monforte
- Joana de Verona – Beatriz Ferreira da Fonseca (Bia)
- Luís Esparteiro – Miguel Ferreira da Fonseca
- Ana Sofia Martins – Vera Andrade
- Sílvia Pfeifer – Mónica Ferreira da Fonseca
- Pedro Carvalho – Tomás Ferreira da Fonseca
- Dina Félix da Costa – Rita Ferreira da Fonseca
- Nuno Pardal – António Ferreira da Fonseca
- Susana Arrais – Jéssica Andrade
- Pedro Hossi – Hadjalmar Andrade (Hadja)
- Manuela Couto – Amanda Nascimento
- Inês Nunes – David/Catarina Nascimento
- Fredy Costa – Tiago Andrade
- Úrsula Corona – Valéria de Scarpa
- Sofia Escobar – Inês Santiago
- Fernando Pires – Gonçalo Santiago
- Sofia Grillo – Paula Sampaio
- Vítor D'Andrade – Lúcio Sampaio
- Mafalda Marafusta – Cátia Sampaio
- Sofia Nicholson – Judite Sampaio
- José Wallenstein – Joaquim Fernandes
- Ângelo Torres – Padre Sebastião
- Zezé Motta – D. Nénem
- Pedro Lamares – Francisco Dias Pimentel
- Adriano Toloza – Edu
- Thai Anjos – Aparecida
- Bruno Cabrerizo – Laurentino da Silva
- Cassiano Carneiro – Edson
- Nuno Homem de Sá – Otelo Monteiro
- Rodrigo Paganelli – Salvador Ferreira da Fonseca
- Mónica Duarte – Mafalda Ferreira da Fonseca
- Júlia Palha – Sancha Ferreira da Fonseca
- João Correia – Bernardo Ferreira da Fonseca
- Daniela Melchior – Cláudia Andrade
- Diogo Branco – Sérgio Sampaio
- Ema Melo – Sol Santiago
- Gonçalo Oliveira – Guilherme Simões
- Sofia Franco – Nadine Santos
- Dylan Miguel – Henrique Silva
- Paulo Pires – João Magalhães
- Fernanda Diniz – Jaciara

== Awards and nominations ==
Year	Award	Category	Nominated	Result
2018	International Emmy Award	Best Telenovela	Ouro Verde	Won
