= Ângelo Torres =

Portuguese actor (born 1968)

- Born: 14 April 1968 (age 58); Spanish Guinea
- Occupations: Actor, film director, screenwriter
- Years active: 1987–present
- Height: 1.83 m (6 ft 0 in)

Ângelo Torres (born 14 April 1968) is an actor, film director and screenwriter. Born in the Spanish Guinea to Portuguese São Tomé and Príncipe parents, he is a Portuguese national. He is best known for the roles in the films Kunta, Hay Road and Magnetick Pathways.

== Personal life ==
He was born on 14 April 1968 in Equatorial Guinea. His parents were São Toméans and Torres has 24 brothers, though only three are from the same father and mother. At the age of six, he left Equatorial Guinea and moved to Cuba, where he studied engineering until the age of 21. After seven years in Cuba, he moved to Portugal to study at a polytechnic institute in Lisbon. Later, he made his acting debut in the production Por ser preto.

He is married to a Galician–speaking Spanish woman and the couple has one daughter, Mar.

== Career ==
His maiden cinema acting came through the film A Ilha dos Escravos. He was elected the Best Secondary Actor of 2012, for the feature film Estrada de Palha. Later in the same year, he won the same award for same film at 18th Festival Caminhos do Cinema Português.

== Filmography ==
Year	Film	Role	Genre	Ref.
1987	Duma Vez por Todas		Film	
1991	O Café do Ambriz		TV mini-series	
1991	Por Mares Nunca Dantes Navegados		TV series	
1992	Xavier	Worker	Film	
1992	Mauser		TV movie	
1993	Encontros imperfeitos	Car washer	Film	
1993	O Miradouro da Lua		Film	
1994	Sozinhos em Casa		TV series	
1995	Foreign Land	Angolano 1	Film	
1996	Novacek	Eduardo	TV series	
1996	A Mulher do Sr. Ministro	Punjabi	TV series	
1996	Polícias	Jerónimo	TV series	
1996	Pensão Estrela	Mario	TV series	
1997	A Tempestade da Terra	Ningo	Film	
1997	Estado de Sítio		Video short	
1998	Ora Viva!	Cocuana	TV series	
1998	Ilunga		Film	
1999	O Fura-Vidas		TV series	
1999	Jornalistas	Immigrant	TV series	
2000	Among Us	Pedro	Short film	
2000	A Noiva		TV movie	
2000	Black & White		Short film	
2001	Querido Professor		TV series	
2002	88	Officer Vitor	TV movie	
2002	Sociedade Anónima	Guarda Antunes	TV series	
2002	La mort est rousse	Madousso	TV movie	
2002	My Voice	Yano	Film	
2002	Storia di guerra e d'amicizia		Film	
2002	Almirante Reis	Policeman	Short film	
2003	Preto E Branco	Pascoal	Film	
2003	Volpone	Castrato	TV movie	
2004	Tudo Isto é Fado	Amadeu, the crook	Film	
2004	The Murmuring Coast	Hotel Clerk	Film	
2005	Hi! Am Erica	Jimmy	Film	
2008	A Ilha dos Escravos	João	Film	
2008	Surface		Short film	
2008	Casos da Vida	Mauro	TV series	
2008	Rebelde Way	Adérito	TV series	
2008	Liberdade 21	Dr. Eduardo	TV series	
2009	O Último Condenado à Morte	Baltazar	Film	
2009	Equador	Libério	TV mini-series	
2009	Vamos Ouvir		TV series	
2010	Conta-me Como Foi	Padre Luís	TV series	
2011	Laços de Sangue		TV series	
2011	O Bar do Ti-Chico	Kudebenguela	TV movie	
2011	Nha Fala		Film	
2012	Hay Road	Américo	Film	
2012	Amareloazulpretoamarelo	Adult Lucas	Short film	
2013	Maternidade	Abel Cassamá	TV series	
2013	Bobô	Tio	Film	
2013	A Mãe do Senhor Ministro	Dos Santos	TV series	
2013	The Thorn of the Rose	Policia	Film	
2013	Estranhamento	Paquete	Short film	
2014	Fortunato: D'aqui até São Torcato		Short film	
2015	Ornamento e Crime	Arão	Film	
2016	A Pedra	Doctor	Short film	
2017	A Única Mulher	Norberto Venâncio	TV series	
2017	A Ilha dos Cães	Pera D'Aço	Film	
2017	Damned Summer	Xamã	Film	
2017	Ouro Verde	Padre Sebastião	TV series	
2017	O Fim da Inocência	Mário	Film	
2018	A Herdeira	Calu	TV series	
2018	Gabriel	Valdo	Film	
2018	Magnetick Pathways	João Lobo	Film	
2019	Para Além da Memória	Mecenas	Film	
2019	Prisioneira	Henrique Drummond	Film	
2020	The Last Bath	Edgar	Film	
2022	Nayola	The Boy	Film	
TBD	Já Te Disse Que Te Amo?	André	Short film	

== See also ==
- Cinema of Africa
- Mionga ki Ôbo, film made by Torres
- Shooting Stars Award
