= Mionga ki Ôbo =

2005 São Toméan documentary film

- Directed by: Ângelo Torres
- Written by: Ângelo Torres
- Produced by: Luis Correia; Noé Mendelle
- Cinematography: Daniel Neves
- Edited by: Vítor Alves
- Music by: Tiago Cerqueira
- Production company: LX Filmes
- Release dates: 2005 (São Tomé and Príncipe)
- Running time: 52 min.
- Country: São Tomé and Príncipe
- Language: Portuguese

Mionga ki Ôbo (Theatrically: Mionga ki Ôbo: Mar e Selva), is a 2002 São Toméan documentary film directed by Ângelo Torres and co-produced by Luis Correia and Noé Mendelle for LX Filmes.

The film deals with the amazing journey of the oldest inhabitants of the island of São Tomé: The Angolares. They are reputedly descendants of Angolan slaves who survived a 1540 shipwreck. This is one of few films filmed and documented in São Tomé and Príncipe.

== Cast ==
- Nezó as himself - Painter, Musician, Sculptor
- Vino Sr. as himself - Retired Fisherman
- João Sr. as himself - Retired Fisherman
- Baltazar Quaresma as himself - Student
- Julieta Paulina Lundi as himself - Fisherman
- Bibiano da Silva as himself - Fisherman who no longer fishes
- Fernando Sr. as himself - Merchant
- António Soares Pereira as himself - Fisherman
- Liga Liga as himself - Healer
- Dance Group of S. João dos Angolares as Themselves
- Voice of the King Group as Themselves
- Bulauê Group as Themselves
- Congo Dance Group as Themselves
- Anguené Group as Themselves
