= The Vows =

1973 film

- Directed by: António de Macedo
- Written by: Bernardo Santareno
- Produced by: Francisco de Castro; António de Macedo
- Starring: Guida Maria
- Cinematography: Elso Roque
- Edited by: António de Macedo
- Release date: 1973
- Running time: 102 minutes
- Country: Portugal
- Language: Portuguese

The Vows (Portuguese: A Promessa) is a 1973 Portuguese drama film directed by António de Macedo. It was entered into the 1973 Cannes Film Festival.

== Synopsis ==
Maria do Mar and her husband, José, are young newlyweds living in a fishing village, Palheiros de Tocha, between Aveiro and Figueira da Foz. Their intimacy is disturbed, however, by a vow of chastity they took as a result of a storm that caused the shipwreck of José's father's boat. Both live in permanent tension, caused by the presence of Labareda, a gypsy taken in by the couple following a dispute in which he was stabbed.

== Cast ==
- Guida Maria - Maria do Mar
- Sinde Filipe - Labareda
- João Mota - José
- Luís Santos - Salvador
- J. Rodrigues de Carvalho - Mário
- Fernando Loureiro - Gypsy
- Luís Barradas - Gypsy
- Fernanda Coimbra - Gypsy
- Maria - Joaquina
- Grece de Castro - Grandmother
- Xico Machado - Father João
- Agostinho Alves - Father Couto
- Celeste Alves - Maria's neighbour
