= Rabo de Peixe =

- Civil parish
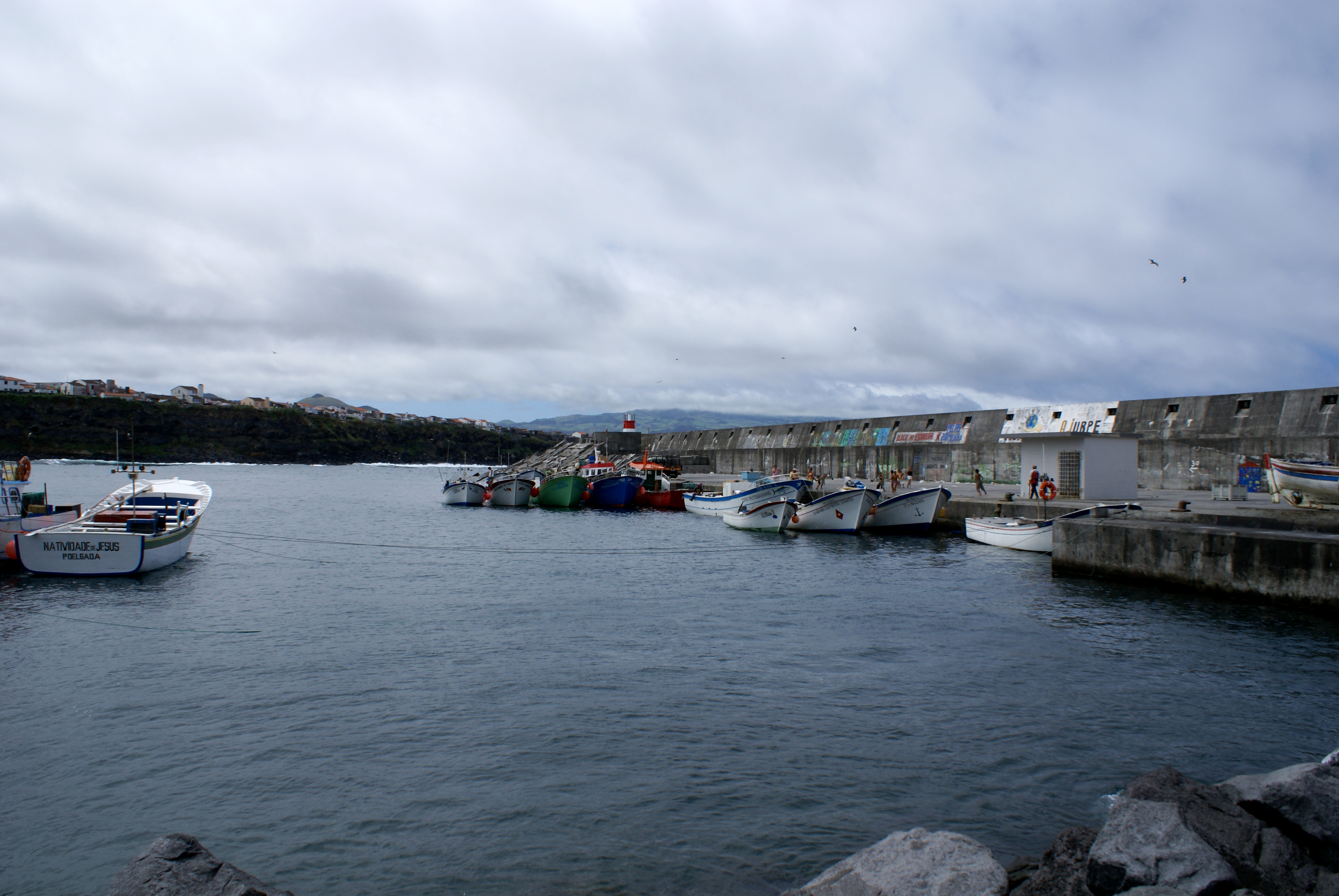
- The main harbour and port of Rabo de Peixe, the life-blood of the community

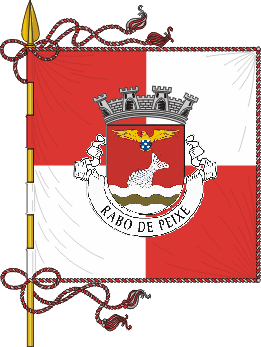
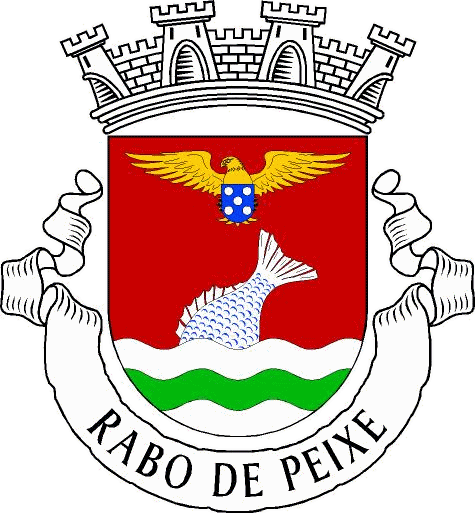
- Flag Coat of arms

- Location of the civil parish of Rabo de Peixe in the municipality of Ribeira Grande
- Coordinates: 37°48′37″N 25°35′10″W
- Country: Portugal
- Auton. region: Azores
- Island: São Miguel
- Municipality: Ribeira Grande
- Established: Settlement: c. 1500; Town: 2004

Area
  - Total: 16.96 km^{2} (6.55 sq mi)
- Elevation: 43 m (141 ft)

Population (2011)
  - Total: 8,866
  - Density: 522.8/km^{2} (1,354/sq mi)
- Time zone: UTC−01:00 (AZOT)
  - Summer (DST): UTC+00:00 (AZOST)
- Postal code: 9600-124
- Area code: 292
- Patron: Senhor Bom Jesus
- Website: www.jf-rabodepeixe.pt

Rabo de Peixe (Portuguese for "fish tail") is a civil parish in the municipality of Ribeira Grande in the Portuguese archipelago of the Azores. The population in 2011 was 8,866, in an area of 16.96 km^{2}. It is the most populous and most densely populated parish in the municipality. It contains the localities Charco, Custódio, Labardas, Nogueira, Pico da Madeira, Pico da Varanda, Pico do Bode, Pico do Refugio, Rebentão, Santana, São Sebastião, Senhora da Conceição and Tulha.

== History ==
It is uncertain when the territory was settled, although it is assumed that the settlement of Ribeira Grande may have directly affected colonization of the area. Local sources put the colonization at around the 15th century, by Flemish and Moorish settlers.

Its toponomy was first defined by Father Gaspar Frutuoso during the 16th century, who reflected on the fact that the area received its name owing to the physical topography. As he indicated, the terrestrial physiography, and specifically the land around one of its bays resembled a fish tail, or in Portuguese rabo de peixe (literally tail of the fish). Similarly, another reference by the priest and chronicler indicated that the area was also known for the discovery of the tail of a large unknown species of fish, and may have received its name from this legendary account.

The Church of Senhor Bom Jesus was constructed in the 18th century: the project was started in 1690 and concluded in 1735 in the Baroque style typical of the islands.

In the locality of Santana, a fertile plain that extends from Rabo de Peixe until the edge of the town of Ribeira Grande was used during the era of the Second World War as a military airfield. Following 1946, it was transformed into the islands first civilian airport, before being abandoned in favour of the Ponta Delgada-Nordela air strip along the southern coast.

Rabo de Peixe was elevated to the status of town on 25 April 2004.

Owing to the importance of the port the economy and life of the civil parish, on the 19 August 2012, then-regional president Carlos Cesar announced the remodelling and extension of the port facility, which includes two new wings: a 285 metres (935 ft) southern dock, and the a 45 metres (148 ft) northern dock, that runs perpendicular. The project who allow the shelter of ships and equipment within a 3.5 hectares (0.035 km^{2}) area. In addition, the port facility would include a 100 metres (330 ft) floating dock and three piers, in addition to expansion of port facilities to include ramps and docks for the repair of boats, fish-houses and a new 600 metres (2,000 ft) roadway that would circle the complex (linked to the main roadway).

== Economy ==
Essentially, the parish's economy is driven by primary resource production that includes fishing and agriculture, with secondary industries associated with these sectors, including civil construction, fish-processing and some milk-processing facilities.

== Culture ==
Owing to its history, Rabo de Peixe is an area of strong heritage and cultural traditions, that includes traditional festivals, folklore, music and a large architectural patrimony. The religious festivals are valued by the local population, and attract many visitors throughout the year. The begin immediately on the first day of the New Year, with the ‘’Festa do Senhor Bom Jesus’’, the patron saint, but also include the devotional celebrations associated with the Holy Spirit throughout the summer after Pentecosts.

The ‘’Festa da Bandeiras’’ (literally ‘’Festival of the Flags’’) is one of the more expressive celebrations and includes both the commemorations of the ‘’Festas da Beneficência’’ (associated with the ‘’Flag of Charity’’) and the ‘’Festas da Caridade’’ (analogous with the ‘’Flag of the Holy Trinity’’). Accompanying these flags are the ‘’Despensas’’ and ‘’Bailinhos’’, two dances typical of the historical Rabo de Peixe.

There are six coronations associated with the celebrations to the Holy Spirit in Rabo de Peixe: São Sebastião, São João, São Pedro, Dos Inocentes, Santíssima Trindade and Rosário.

On the first Sunday in October is the celebration of the Feast of Nossa Senhora do Rosário (‘’Our Lady of the Rosary’’), marked by a ceremonial procession through the town. The following day, there is also procession which winds through the main roads, which is comparable to the procession through the streets of Ponta Delgada during the festival of Senhor Santo Cristo dos Milagres.

Celebrations in honour of Santa Cecília and Nossa Senhora da Conceição, patron saints of the local philharmonic bands also result in processions, as well as the processions celebrating São Sebastião (on the second-to-last Sunday of January), Senhor dos Passos (third Sunday after Easter), Ramos (Sunday following Easter), Senhor Morto (evening of Good Friday), Senhor Ressuscitado (Easter Sunday), Enfermos (first Sunday after Easter) and São Pedro Gonçalves (on the sixth Sunday after Easter).

The feasts of the Holy Spirit (Portuguese: Espírito Santo) include the folkloric ‘’Despensas’’ (a local dance) that is different to the traditional dances on the island, that include the ‘’Balho dos Homens da Terra’’ and the ‘’Balho dos Homens do Mar’’, which are danced solely by men, accompanied by castanhetas. Throughout the dance women do participate, but they never begin the dance with the men.

The two philharmonic bands of Rabo de Peixe both have a century of existence: the ‘’Sociedade Filarmónica Lira do Norte’’ (founded in 1867) and the ‘’Filarmónica Progresso do Norte’’ (established in 1888).

== In popular culture ==
The Portuguese TV series Turn of the Tide was filmed in Rabo de Peixe. Rabo de Peixe is the original title of the series in Portuguese.

== Notable citizens ==
- António José Moniz ( Rabo de Peixe; 24 May 1868 - Rabo de Peixe; 26 October 1930), a Franciscan priest, orator and colonial missionary, known as Father António do Presépio (António of the Manger);
- Paul José Tavares (Rabo de Peixe; 25 January 1920 - Lisbon; 12 June 1973), priest and, later, Bishop of Macau (1967-1973), where he shifted the attention of the clergy in the Asia away from the traditional Luso-dominated conclaves to Asian-born clergy;
- Manuel António Vasconcelos (Pilar da Bretanha - Rabo de Peixe), journalist and founder of the newspapers Açoriano Oriental and O Temp;
- Ruy Galvão de Carvalho (Rabo de Peixe, 3 November 1903 — Ponta Delgada; 29 April 1991), poet, author, essayist and professor, who was notable for his biography of the life and published works of Antero de Quental, and a diverse literary collection under the pseudonym Abd-el Kader, as well as his Antologia Poética dos Açores
- António Tavares Torres (Rabo de Peixe; 13 June 1856 — Rabo de Peixe, 28 September 1936), a self-taught intellectual, journalist, poet, lyricist (responsible for the first regional anthem Autonomia dos Açores) and politician (member of the Partido Progressista, president of the Municipal Council of Ribeira Grande and Junta Geral);
- José Amaral da Luz (13 June 1879 - ), poet and recognized "King" of the Cavalhadas de São Pedro da Ribeira Seca;
- António Raposo de Amaral (born unknown - died Porto; 23 June 1987), poet, author and bibliophile;
- António Tavares Penacho (1888 - 13 November 1960), founder of the typography studio Insular e Gerente da Oficina de Artes Gráficas, printing the newspaper A Ilha;
- José Vieira (Rabo de Peixe;18 June 1913 - Ponta Delgada; 2 April 1987), a set designer responsible for constructing a large removable stage that allowed the Revistas Lanterna Mágica e Bota to travel throughout the island putting on plays, and who, along with Santo Figueira and Vítor Cruz, was responsible for the great dances in the Coliseu theatre in Ponta Delgada;
- Francisco Manuel Raposo de Almeida (17 August 1817), editor of the Tribuno do Povo (between Novembro 1838 and March 1839), who in the middle of the 19th century emigrated to Brazil, where he was involved in other newspapers, before becoming an author, playwright and historian;
