= Valor da Vida =

- "Pode o tempo voltar atrás?" (Portuguese) "Can time go back?" (English)
- Genre: Melodrama
- Created by: Maria João Costa
- Developed by: Plural Entertainment
- Directed by: Sérgio Graciano
- Starring: Rúben Gomes; Ana Sofia Martins; Dalila Carmo; Joana de Verona; Thiago Rodrigues (see more)
- Opening theme: Tudo Passou by Blaya
- Ending theme: Tudo Passou by Blaya
- Country of origin: Portugal
- Original language: Portuguese
- No. of seasons: 2
- No. of episodes: 203

Production
- Running time: 55 min

Original release
- Network: TVI
- Release: September 30, 2018 – May 20, 2019

Related
- A Herdeira; Prisioneira

Valor da Vida (English: "Value of Life") is a Portuguese telenovela broadcast and produced by TVI. It was written by Maria João Costa. The telenovela premiered on September 30, 2018, and ended on May 20, 2019. It was recorded between Guimarães, Brazil and Lebanon.

== Plot ==
"Value of Life" takes place in Lebanon, Brazil and Portugal. The story reinforces the importance of living in the present and not in the past, a mistake a lot of characters make, especially Artur and Carolina.

Artur is found in Lebanon. He wakes up without a single recollection. He has no idea who he is, what he's doing there or what happened to him, he can't even remember how his face looks like. When the police discover his identity, he finds out he has been reported dead for twenty years. The plot thickens even further when Arthur returns home and everyone realizes that despite the time passed, he hasn't aged a single day.

Carolina has spent the last eight years in a coma after being in a car accident in which her husband was driving. The doctors don't believe she would ever wake up and wanted to disconnect her from the machines that keeps her alive, but neither her husband or her sister allowed it. Suddenly, she wakes up in the exact moment when her husband and sister are about to announce their relationship.

Artur and Carolina feel completely lost in the world they wake up, having many questions to answer and struggling to leave the past behind.

== Seasons ==
Season	Episodes	Originally released	
Season	Episodes	First released	Last released
1	90	September 30, 2018	January 12, 2019
2	113	January 14, 2019	May 20, 2019

== Cast ==
Actor/Actress	Role
Rúben Gomes	Artur Bastos Moreira
Ana Sofia Martins	Carolina Folque
Dalila Carmo	Júlia Bastos Moreira Remédios
Joana de Verona	Sara Folque
Thiago Rodrigues	Vasco Folque
Carolina Kasting	Camilla Vasconcelos
Marcello Antony	Jesus Gonzaga
Isabela Valadeiro	Aisha Afonso
Pedro Barroso	Alexandre Bastos Moreira
José Pimentão	Alexandre Bastos Moreira
Daniela Melchior	Isabel Vasconcelos
Daniela Melchior	Camila (young)
Dina Félix da Costa	Jamilah Afonso
Bruna Quintas	Marta Bastos Moreira
Joaquim Horta	Vitorino Remédios
Romeu Costa	Marcelo Remédios
Laura Dutra	Raíssa Afonso
José Condessa	Bruno Vasconcelos
Nuno Pardal	Luís Ortega
Adriano Toloza	Leonardo
João Pedreiro	Jaques da Silva
Cassiano Carneiro	Eugénio Maria Bastos
Ana Saragoça	Piedade Bastos
Isaac Alfaiate	Paulo Bastos/Sri Raj Ashram
Vera Kolodzig	Ana Clara Bastos
Sílvia Rizzo	Cidália Brito
Teresa Tavares	Gabriela «Becas» Brito
Susana Arrais	Cláudia Folque
Tássia Camargo	Elisa
Isabel Figueira	Michelle Brito
Pedro Hossi	Carlos Brito
Thaiane Anjos	Dalva
Margarida Nazário	Rita Folque
Guilherme Rocha	Pedro Folque
