= Boom TV (Angola and Mozambique) =

- Broadcast area: Angola; Mozambique

Programming
- Language(s): Portuguese

Ownership
- Owner: Seven TV International
- Sister channels: Só Novelas

History
- Launched: 22 July 2014
- Closed: 30 November 2021
- Former names: DStv1 (2014-2017)

Boom TV was an Angolan and Mozambican subscription television channel programmed from Brazil operational between 2014 and 2021. The channel broadcast dubbed television series, movies and international telenovelas.

== History ==
The channel launched as DStv1 on July 22, 2014, on the DStv platform in Angola and Mozambique, as part of a joint launch of five television channels to the Portuguese-speaking packages. Plans to launch the channel in Portugal as Premium 1 by early 2015 were announced, but the channel never launched. At the launch, DStv1 claimed 120,000 subscribers.

In April 2015, it premiered A Única Mulher. TVI had previously sold the production to Televisão Pública de Angola (without specifying which channel), but its premiere on TPA was shelved for unknown reasons, causing DSTV1 to air with exclusive rights.

In December 2016, promos for the channel's rebrand as Boom TV appeared, with a rebrand date set for January 1, 2017. In November 2021, the channel announced its shutdown per DSTV's orders, and ended service on November 30, 2021.
