= João Tordo =

Portuguese writer

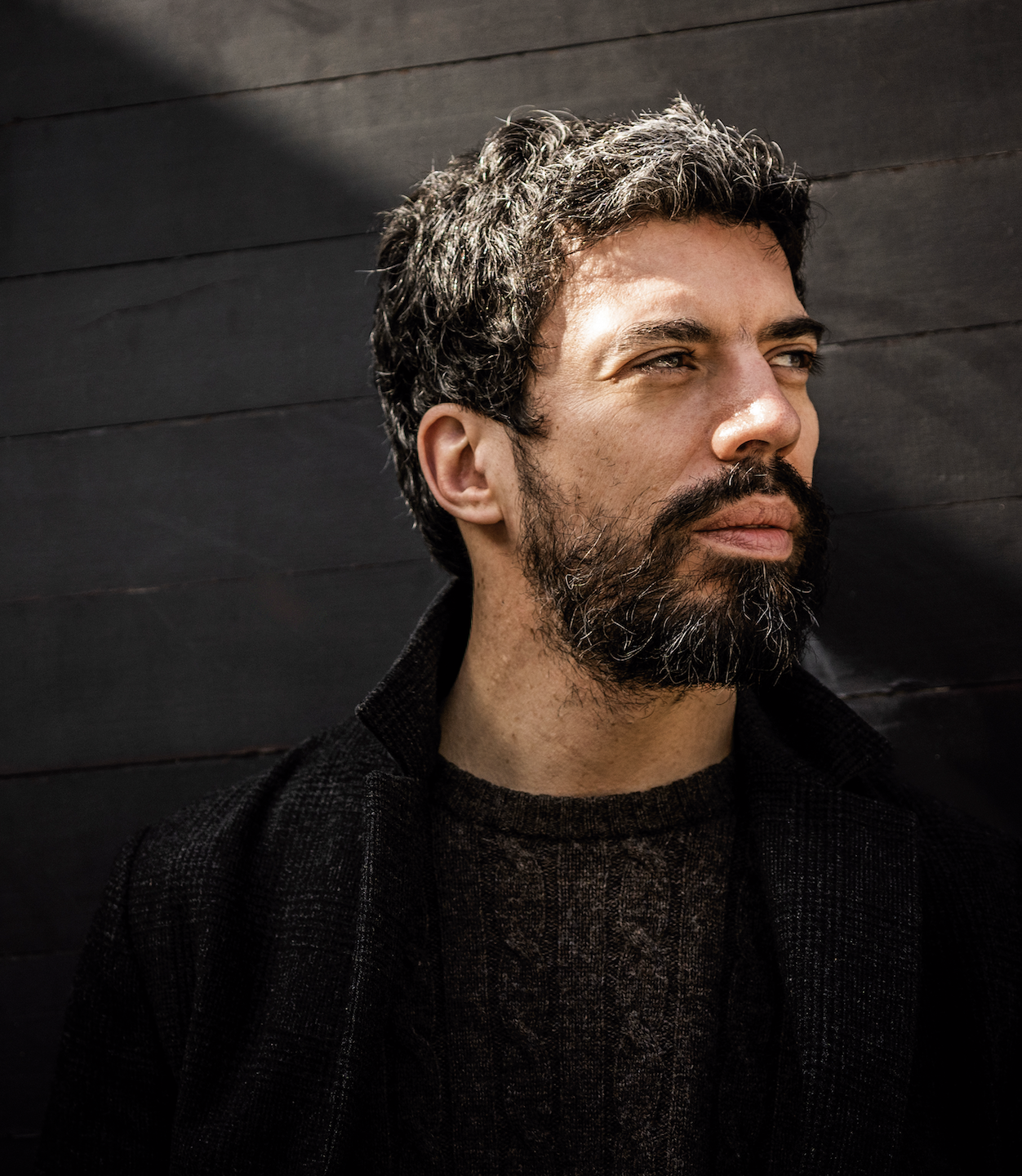

João Tordo (born 28 August 1975) is a Portuguese writer. He is son of Fernando Tordo.

== Biography ==
João Tordo was born in Lisbon on 28 August 1975 to the singer Fernando Tordo. He graduated in philosophy and studied journalism and creative writing in London and New York. His novel As Três Vidas won the José Saramago Prize in 2009. He published nine novels: The Book of Lightless Men (2004), Memory Hotel (2007), Three Lives (2009), The Good Winter (2010), The Anatomy of Martyrs (2011), The Sabbatical Year (2013) Accidental Biography Of a Love Affair (2014) Mourning Elias Gro (2015) and Eden According to Lars D. (2015).

He was shortlisted for the Portugal Telecom Prize, for the Portuguese Society for Authors Award for Narrative Fiction, the Fernando Namora Literary Prize and for the 6th edition of the European Literature Prize. He is a 2024 James Merrill House Fellow.

His books are published in many countries, such as France, Italy and Brazil.

As a screenplay writer, he participated in many television series, including O Segredo de Miguel Zuzarte (RTP), 4 (RTP) and Liberdade XXI (RTP). He still works as a chronicler and a trainer in Fiction Workshops dedicated to Creative Writind and to Novels.

== Works ==
=== Novels ===
- The Book of Lightless Men (Temas e Debates), Novembro de 2004
- Memory Hotel (Quidnovi), Fevereiro de 2007
- Three Lives (Quidnovi), Setembro de 2008, José Saramago Prize 2009
- The Good Winter (Dom Quixote), Setembro 2010
- The Anatomy of Martyrs (Dom Quixote), Novembro 2011
- The Sabbatical Year (Dom Quixote), Fevereiro 2013
- Accidental Biography of a Love Affair, Alfaguara, Abril 2014

=== Anthologies ===
- "Contos de Vampiros", Porto Editora, 2009
- "Dez História Para Ser Feliz", Dom Quixote, 2009
- "Um Natal Assim", Quidnovi, 2008
- "Contos de Terror do Homem Peixe", Chimpanzé Intelectual, 2007
- "O Homem Que Desenhava na Cabeça dos Outros", Oficina do Livro, 2006
