= Little Fruit from the Equator =

1998 film

- Directed by: Herbert Brödl
- Release dates: January 1, 1998
- Running time: +75 minutes
- Countries: Austria, Germany, São Tomé and Príncipe
- Languages: Portuguese, German

Little fruit from the Equator (Portuguese: A frutinha do Equador; German: Früchtchen - Am Äquator ist alles möglich) is a 1998 feature film, directed by Herbert Brödl. The film is an Austrian, German, and São Toméan co-production, though set and filmed entirely on the island of São Tomé. It was the first feature film produced in the country of São Tomé and Príncipe. The film is 78 minutes long. It was first released 1998, as part of that year's Hof International Film Festival and Lübeck Nordic Film Days.

The story is an allegory, combining narrative aspects of comedy films, documentary films, fairy tales, and road movies. The story starts with a dying old woman, who is calling for her distant son. Her calls take solid form in the shape of a giant breadfruit, which falls from the sky right in front of her son's residence. Realizing that this is a message from his mother, the son sets out to find her and takes the fruit with him. His trek across the island involves interactions both with people who are either amused or disturbed by his abnormal fruit, and with those to whom the fruit seems to be an answer to their "fantasies", "desires and dark longings".

This is the third film by Brödl set in areas by the Equator. He considers it part of his "Equator cycle", alongside Jaguar and Rain (1994), Goldland (1996), Bad Boy (2000), Eclipse (2002), and Flyers (2008).

== Sources ==
- Arenas, Fernando (2011), Lusophone Africa: Beyond Independence, University of Minnesota Press, ISBN 978-0-8166-6983-7
