= Filipa Areosa =

Portuguese film and television actress

- Born: July 12, 1990 (age 36); Santarem, Santarem, Portugal
- Occupations: Film, television actress
- Years active: 2011–present

Filipa Areosa (born July 12, 1990) is a Portuguese film and television actress, best known for her appearances in TV series, including O Mundo ao Contrario (2013), Morangos com Açucar (2012), Os Filhos do Rock, Aqui Tão Longe(2016), Mar Salgado(2014–2015) and Nazaré (telenovela) (2019-2020). She also has made appearances in films, including Morangos Com Açucar – O Filme, A Uma Hora Incerta and other short movies.

== Filmography ==
=== Film ===
Year	Film	Role	Notes
2012	Morangos com Açucar – o Filme	Ana Rita Soares	
2015	A Uma Hora Incerta	Deolinda	
2015	A Peça	Filipa	Short Movie
2015	Sintoma de Ausência (Absence)	Rita	Short Movie
2016	Zeus		currently in post production
2023	Bad Living	Camila	
2023	Living Bad	Camila	

=== Television ===
Year	Show	Role	Notes
2012	Morangos com Açucar	Ana Rita Soares	269 Episodes
2013	Mundo ao Contrário	Lara Malta Carvalho	146 Episodes
2014	Os Filhos do Rock	Beatriz	26 Episodes
2015	Mar Salgado	Madalena Pelicano	317 Episodes
2016	Aqui Tão Longe	Cristina Lindo	32 Episodes
2016-17	Amor Maior	Mafalda Tavares Resende	170 Episodes (On Air)
2019-20	Nazaré (telenovela)	Bárbara Soares	211 Episodes (On Air)
2022	Sequia	Rita	2 Episodes

== Trivia ==
She shaved her head for a role in Amor Maior.
