= Katya Aragão =

São Toméan filmmaker, and journalist

- Born: Katya Aragão; 1986 (age 39–40); São Tomé, São Tomé and Príncipe
- Education: Universidade Lusófona
- Occupations: Director, Producer, Journalist
- Years active: 2009–present

Katya Aragão (born 1986), is a São Toméan filmmaker, producer, journalist and TEDxSão Tomé curator. She is best known for her critics acclaimed directorial debut short film Mina Kiá.

== Personal life ==
She was born in 1986 in São Tomé and Príncipe.

== Career ==
She started her career as a journalist in Portuguese and São Tomé. In 2009, she obtained her degree in science of communication and culture at the Universidade Lusófona, Portugal. Then in 2012 she started to work with Televisão Santomense (Santomense Television - TVS) until 2015. During this period, he hosted a talk show on national television before being promoted to head of the channel's Program and Production department. In the meantime, she also worked as a writer and producer. In 2013, he introduced TEDx, the local, self-organized version of TED talks to São Tomé and she later made a platform to disseminate ideas and projects with a local impact, guide the entrepreneurs and doers.

In 2017, she made her directorial debut with the short film Mina Kiá. The film became a turning point of her career, where the film was selected for screening at many international film festivals, such as Kugoma – Mozambique Film Forum in Maputo, the São Tomé and Principe International Film Festival, FESTIN, the international Portuguese language film festival, the international women's film festival Porto Femme, the Cape Verde European Film Festival, and the African Film Week at Angola House in Brazil. Then the film was screened at a co-production of Alliance Française and UNICEF on the 29th anniversary of the Convention on the Rights of the Child.

After the success of the short, she directed a mini-series of 8 episodes broadcast on the National Television of São Tomé and Principe. In 2021, she developed the program Muncanha along with the Santomean producer, Enerlid Franca. The film later won two awards at the Yaoundé Film Lab 2021.

== Filmography ==
| Year | Film | Role | Genre | Ref. |
|---|---|---|---|---|
| 2017 | Mina Kiá | Director, Producer | Short film | |
| 2000 | The Wê Anthology | Producer, Production assistant | Documentary | |
| 2000 | One Day on Earth | Cinematographer | Documentary | |
| 2021 | Muncanha | Director | Film | |
