= Mina Kiá =

Narrative feature film about girls' status in São Tomé and Príncipe

- Directed by: Katya Aragão
- Starring: Ana Pinheiro
- Production company: Tela Digital Media Group
- Release date: September 28, 2017
- Running time: 45 minutes
- Country: São Tomé and Príncipe
- Language: Portuguese

Mina Kiá (the little housemaid) is a 2017 short drama film from São Tomé and Príncipe, the directorial debut of Katya Aragão. It tells of the hardships faced by girls in São Tomé. The film features Ana Pinheiro in the lead role. Additional participants include Ely Patrícia, Marilene Mandinga, Job do Mocho, and Djamila Costa.

== Plot summary ==
Tónia dreams of becoming a journalist. Her family sends her to live with relatives in the big city. Her relatives treat her like a housemaid, and abuse and rape her. Other girls in similar situations drop out of school and forego any professional future, but Tonya is determined to persevere and make her dreams come true.

== Background and production ==
The film was produced with funding from European External Action Service program for film development in Africa and the promotion of human rights. Filming took place in Porto Alegre and in various locations on the island of São Tomé.

Aragão created the film in order to highlight the issues facing girls in her country, to expose the taboo associated with the topic, and to promote resolution of these problems through education. The issue is recognized as a serious problem in São Tomé and Principe. Aragão has stated that violence and discrimination towards girls are the main reasons they drop out of school, and that she intentionally did not depict her main character, Tónia, as quitting her education in spite of the extreme hardships she faced. "I chose to show a young girl's empowerment through education... The film is intended to spark dialog about a subject that is taboo, and raise awareness about what's going on, so that the mentality can change, and to encourage the struggle for women's rights and gender equality, which we are far from achieving at this point."

== Release ==
The film was selected for screening at many international film festivals, mostly Portuguese language ones, including Kugoma – Mozambique Film Forum in Maputo, the São Tomé and Principe International Film Festival, FESTIN, the international Portuguese language film festival, the international women's film festival Porto Femme, the Cape Verde European Film Festival, and the African Film Week at Angola House in Brazil.

On the 29th anniversary of the Convention on the Rights of the Child, the film was screened at a co-production of Alliance Française and UNICEF, on November 23, 2018, and it was also broadcast on the international television station RTF on November 3, 2018.
