= A Única Mulher =

Portuguese telenovela

- "É impossível até acontecer" (Portuguese) "It's only impossible until it happens" (English)
- Genre: Romance, Melodrama, Mystery
- Created by: Maria João Mira; André Ramalho
- Developed by: Plural Entertainment
- Directed by: António Borges Correia
- Starring: Lourenço Ortigão; Ana Sofia Martins; Rita Pereira; Alexandra Lencastre; José Wallenstein (see more)
- Opening theme: A Única Mulher by Anselmo Ralph
- Ending theme: A Única Mulher by Anselmo Ralph
- Country of origin: Portugal
- Original language: Portuguese
- No. of seasons: 3
- No. of episodes: 561

Production
- Executive producer: José Eduardo Moniz
- Production locations: Portugal, Angola
- Running time: 50min

Original release
- Network: TVI
- Release: March 15, 2015 – January 6, 2017

A Única Mulher (English: Mara - The Only One | Spanish: La Única Mujer) is a Portuguese telenovela broadcast and produced by TVI. It is written by Maria João Mira, author of some of the biggest hits of the channel, and her son André Ramalho. The telenovela premiered on March 15, 2015 and aired at 9 pm (UTC) primetime slot. It was recorded between Lisbon (Portugal) and Luanda (Angola).

The telenovela was the second most watched program in its timeslot. After July, 2015, its ratings started increasing and had the best performance in October, regularly winning its timeslot. Its rising popularity led TVI to announce a second season one month before the ending. This is the first time that a Portuguese telenovela is split into seasons. The second season premiere hit the series' second highest score ever, becoming the most watched tv show in Portugal throughout the season and surpassing its competition. In 2016, the telenovela was renewed once again for a third season.

The debut of the new season in May made similar ratings to the second season, continuing its leading position. TVI is already debating about a possible fourth season.

Season	Episodes	Originally released		Rating	Share	Rank
Season	Episodes	First released	Last released	Rating	Share	Rank
1	189	March 15, 2015	October 17, 2015	13.9%	29.1%	#2
2	174	October 19, 2015	April 30, 2016	14.7%	30.0%	#1
3	198	May 2, 2016	January 6, 2017	TBA	TBA	#1

Note: Each percentage point of rating equals 95,000 viewers. These numbers do not include recorded or delayed viewing, only live views.

== Production ==
The telenovela was first announced in March 2014 by Maria João Mira, whose last telenovela was Doida Por Ti in 2012. By August, the telenovela received its first title, Project Angola, and the first names of the main cast: actresses Alexandra Lencastre, Rita Pereira and international Portuguese model and presenter Ana Sofia Martins. The cast would also be played by African and Brazilian actors. The plot addresses racism, xenophobia and political crisis.

"It always seems impossible until it´s done", well known quote that inspired the slogan of the telenovela

— Nelson Mandela

José Eduardo Moniz, advisor of TVI's programs, reveals Angola has one of the main sets of the telenovela, with long-run scenes, along with Portugal. Shooting between two continents was one of the essential parts of the project. Later in November 2014, A Única Mulher was revealed as the official title in an exclusive event.

"The images of Angola will be present throughout the telenovela", especially since "alongside the other protagonists, Angola is also protagonist". "It's a country with very strong traditions in Portugal, from which a very large part of Portuguese have huge nostalgia. What we do is a return to the past, crossing it with the enormous progress that this country [Angola] suffered"

— José Eduardo Moniz

He was also involved in the concept of the main plot. The project's scale gives it the title of most expensive Portuguese telenovela ever and first to have long-run scenes between two different countries and continents. A Única Mulher started being recorded in November 2014. On March 13, 2015, two days before the premiere, the official launch event was broadcast by TVI.

"It is a rare product. There is a lot of investment, a lot of commitment and there is an effort to diversify the scenarios of the telenovela that we've never did before"

— José Eduardo Moniz

The promotion of the telenovela started on February 13 and took place on television, web, exteriors, radio, newspapers and magazines and had a huge impact in the audience. Alongside, TVI was also promoting it as a "worldwide premiere", as it was the first Portuguese telenovela to be exported to another country without having debuted in Portugal. The telenovela was also featured in the 22nd anniversary celebrations of TVI.

The first scene of the telenovela begins at a mining site, where the main character Luís Miguel is taken by surprise by an explosion. This scene was recorded in Angola. The episode then rolls back to Portugal and everything is explained until the explosion took place.

== Plot ==
=== Season 2 ===
One year later, Mara and Luís Miguel's twin babies take their first steps.

Before dying, Cândida (Laurinda Chiungue) shows Vita (Maura Faial) her birth certificate which reveals that her real mother is still alive and working in Norberto Venâncio's house. At first, Neuza (Mina Andala) does not believe in it. Later, she apologizes to her daughter and shows its willingness to be her mother. But Vita is not quite what she seems; along with César (Pêpê Rapazote), pediatrician, the duo arrives to haunt and destabilize the life of Mara and Luís Miguel. Vita starts working as nanny of the twin babies and quietly seduces Luís Miguel. Betrayal is a matter of time...

With her face disfigured and attached to a wheelchair, Pilar does not conform to her life. Apart from having been deceived and robbed by António (Pedro Carmo), Luís Miguel does not forgive how much harm she did to separate him from Mara. The whole family turn their back and she attempts suicide. Her children become worried and Luís Miguel, along with Mara, tries to prevent his mother's madness. In fact, Pilar will not facilitate the live of her children and daughter in law. Leandro (Fredy Costa) is her physiotherapist and will try everything for her to not lose hope of walking again one day, forming an unlikely friendship between her and a black race man, something she despised.

Unable to overcome the death of her fiancé, Sara (Joana de Verona) closes herself in Diogo's house and gets drunk every day. Concerned about the follies of his daughter, António recruits Tânia and Radu to follow and watch over her. At that time, Sara and Leandro know each other and the two engage in a romance also unlikely. But the self destructive stage of Sara will destabilize their love.

Norberto remains in prison and is threatened and beaten several times. Ramiro, also in the same prison, will try to save the Angolan businessman of problems, but ends up being stabbed. António tries at all costs to end Norberto's life in prison, but one of his hitman is killed and the evidences against Norberto are absolved.

Now out of prison, Norberto promises revenge and will not return alone, joining forces with Pilar to reclaim what was his and end with António's life.

== Cast ==
Actor	Character	Season		
Actor	Character	1	2	3
Alexandra Lencastre	Pilar Sacramento	Main	Main	Main
José Wallenstein	Jorge Sacramento	Main	Main	Main
Rita Pereira	Luena da Silva	Main	Main	Main
Ana Sofia Martins	Mara Venâncio	Main	Main	Main
Lourenço Ortigão	Luís Miguel Sacramento	Main	Main	Main
Ângelo Torres	Norberto Venâncio	Main	Main	Main
Mina Andala	Neuza dos Anjos	Regular	Regular	
Marta Melro	Rafaela Mestre	Regular	Regular	
Leonor Seixas	Sílvia Caiado	Regular	Regular	
Pedro Lima	Pedro Caiado	Regular	Regular	
Inês Gonçalves	Mafalda Barros	Regular	Regular	
João Catarré	Ramiro Neves	Regular	Regular	
Sílvia Rizzo	Isabel Batista	Regular	Regular	
Paula Neves	Concha Albergaria	Regular	Regular	
Paulo Pires	Henrique Albergaria	Regular	Regular	
Matilde Breyner	Maria Antónia («Mitó») Borralho	Regular	Regular	
Lia Gama	Berta Vieira	Regular	Regular	
Sofia Baessa	Yolanda Gamboa	Regular	Regular	
Leandro Pires	Artur Gamboa	Regular	Regular	
Joana de Verona	Sara Sacramento	Regular	Regular	
Kelly Bailey	Francisca Sacramento	Regular	Regular	
Bruno Cabrerizo	Santiago Ortiz	Regular	Regular	
Sara Prata	Daniela Fragoso	Regular	Regular	
Nuno Homem de Sá	Albino («Bino») das Dores	Regular	Regular	
Ana Marta Ferreira	Clara Albergaria	Regular	Regular	
Ricardo de Sá	Bruno Borralho	Regular	Regular	
Alberto Magassela	Arsénio Kianda	Regular	Regular	
Gany Ferreira	Kizua Kianda	Regular	Regular	
Graciano Dias	Diogo Mendonça	Regular	Guest	
Maria Leite	Ana Maria Baptista	Regular	Guest	
André Nunes	Orlando Barros	Regular		
Orlando Costa	Sebastião Pereira	Regular		
Catarina Matos	Isaura («Isaurinha») das Dores	Regular		
Irma Ribeiro	Patrícia das Dores	Regular		
Manuel Wiborg	Inspetor Camacho	Recurring	Regular	
Pedro Carmo	António de Lucena	Recurring	Regular	
Joana Câncio	Tânia	Recurring	Regular	
João Didelet	Radu	Recurring	Regular	
Pedro Barroso	Rodrigo Dias	Recurring	Regular	
Maura Faial	Vita	Guest	Regular	
Rita Brütt	Inspetora Laura	Recurring	Guest	
Rita Cruz	Rosário Venâncio	Recurring		
Alfredo Brito	Raúl Falcão	Recurring		
Fredy Costa	Leandro		Regular	
Lídia Franco	Guilhermina («Mina») Albergaria		Regular	
Pêpê Rapazote	César Varela		Regular	

=== Children ===
- Isaac Carvalho - João da Silva - (Júnior)
- Diana Melo - Matilde Caiado
- João Fernandes - Tomás Caiado
- Maria Arrais - Joana Fragoso

== Broadcast ==
Exhibition by release date
Country	Channel	Title	Seasons	Premiere	Finale	Timeslot	Ref.
Portugal	TVI	A Única Mulher	3	March 15, 2015	January 6, 2017	Monday to Saturday, at 9.30pm	Ref.
Angola	DStv1	A Única Mulher	2	April 21, 2015	?	Monday to Friday, at 9 pm	
Mozambique	DStv1	A Única Mulher	2	April 21, 2015	?	Monday to Friday, at 10 pm	
Chile	Canal 13	La Única Mujer	1	August 30, 2015	February 19, 2016	Monday to Friday, at 5.45pm	
Cape Verde	TCV	A Única Mulher	1	October 19, 2015	?	Monday to Saturday, at 7 pm	
Paraguay	Telefuturo	La Única Mujer	1	November 30, 2015	May 27, 2016	Monday to Friday, at 7 pm	
South Africa	SABC 2	Mara - The Only One	1	2017	2018	Monday to Friday, at 12:30 pm	
Uruguay	Monte Carlo TV	La Única Mujer	1	January 4, 2016	?	Monday to Friday, at 5 pm	
Bolivia	Unitel	La Única Mujer	1	August 10, 2016	?	Monday to Friday, at 11 am	
France	Réseau France Outre-mer (RFO) (French Overseas Territories)	Mara, une femme unique	1	September 29, 2016	?	Monday to Friday, at 11 am	
Argentina	El Trece	La Única Mujer	1	2016	TBA	TBA	

Note: the telenovela was also broadcast on TVI's international channel, in over 10 countries.
