= Maria João Mira =

Portuguese screenwriter (born 1959)

Maria João Mira (born 18 September 1959 in Lisbon) is a Portuguese screenwriter who authored several successful telenovelas.

== Biography ==
Mira was the director of the Casa da Criação (House of Creation), a television writing company founded in 2001 by the production company Nicolau Breyner Produções. Her son, André Ramalho, is also a screenwriter. They have been working together on some occasions.

== Television ==
- Sonhos Traídos (2002)
- Saber Amar (2003)
- O Teu Olhar (2003–2004)
- Queridas Feras (2003–2004)
- Morangos com Açúcar (2003–2005)
- Mistura Fina (2004–2005)
- Fala-me de Amor (2006)
- Ilha dos Amores (2007)
- Flor do Mar (2008–2009)
- Anjo Meu (2011–2012)
- Doida Por Ti (2012–2013)
- A Única Mulher (2015-2017)
- A Herdeira (2017-2018)
