= Sofia Aparício =

Portuguese model and actress

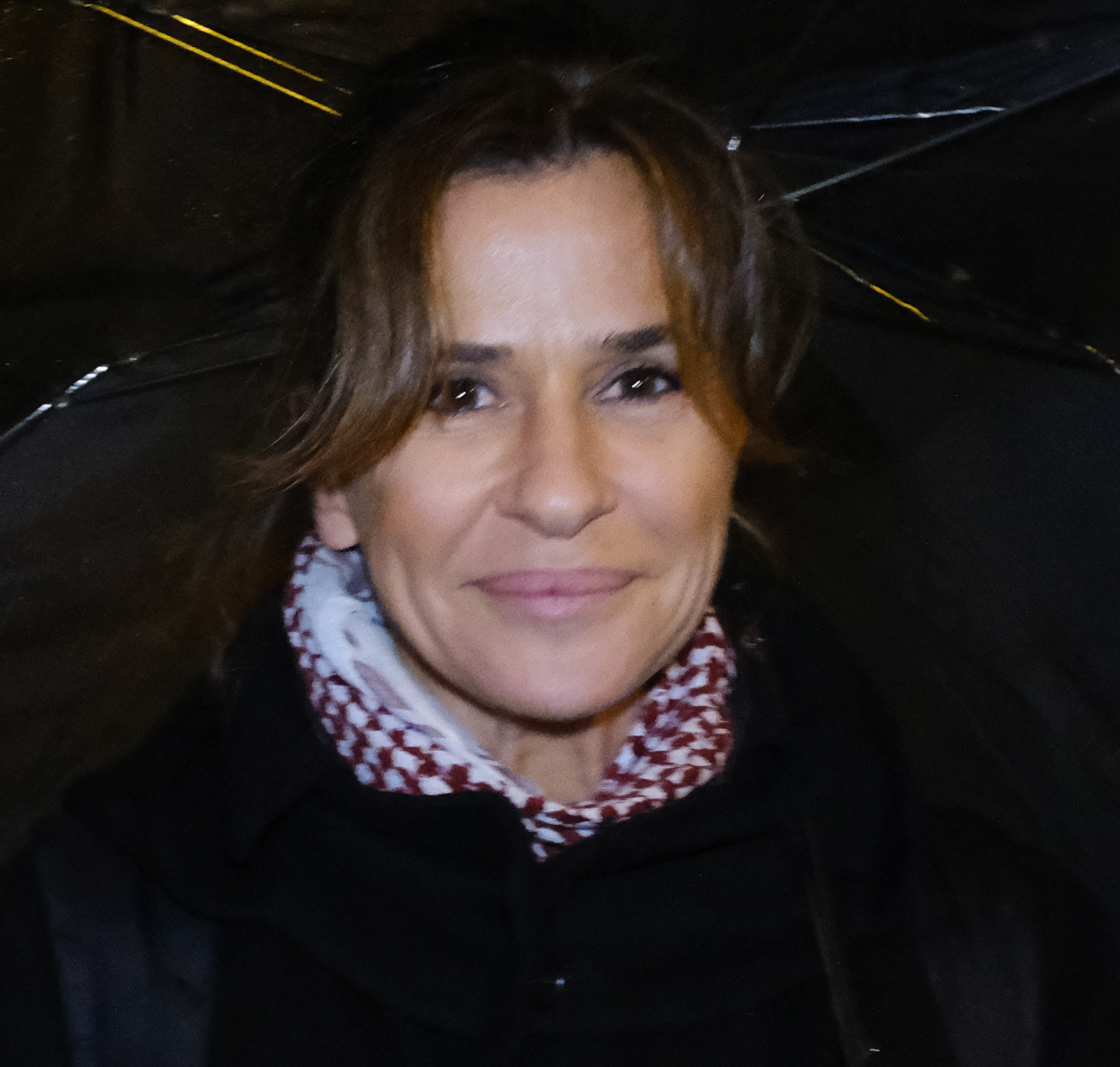
- Aparício in March 2024
- Born: Sofia Delgado Cardoso dos Santos Aparício; 2 June 1970 (age 56); Viana do Castelo, Portugal
- Modeling information
- Height: 1.76 m (5 ft 9 in)
- Hair color: Brown
- Eye color: Brown
- Agency: Just Models

Sofia Delgado Cardoso dos Santos Aparício (born 2 June 1970) is a Portuguese model and actress.

== Personal life ==
On 29 January 2017, Aparício came out as bisexual, declaring to have had relationships with both men and women.

== Activism ==
In late August 2025, Sofia Aparício joined the Global Sumud Flotilla, a civil society-led humanitarian mission aiming to break the Israeli naval blockade of the Gaza Strip. She is one of at least three Portuguese participants, along with economist and politician Mariana Mortágua and activist Miguel Duarte. Their involvement drew attention to the humanitarian crisis in Gaza and prompted calls for governmental protection of the mission.
