= Sandra Faleiro =

Portuguese actress

- Born: Sandra Maria Gonçalves Faleiro; 1 September 1972 (age 53); Lisbon, Portugal

Sandra Maria Gonçalves Faleiro (born 1 September 1972) is a Portuguese actress. Her film acting credits include the films The Domain, Um Dia Longo and Technoboss and her television credits include A Impostora and as the titular character in Madre Paula.
