= Julie Sergeant =

Portuguese television, film and stage actor

- Born: 25 January 1970 (age 55); London, England
- Occupation(s): Television, film and stage actor
- Spouse: Cassiano Carneiro (divorced)
- Children: One daughter
- Parent(s): Mike Sergeant and Guida Maria

Julie Sergeant (born 1970) is a British-born actress who works in Portugal and Brazil.

== Early life ==
Julie Sergeant was born in London on 25 January 1970. She is the daughter of the Portuguese actress Guida Maria (1950-2018) and the Scottish musician Mike Sergeant, who were married from 1969 to 1972. Maria was a pioneering actress in addressing issues of sexuality, purchasing the Portuguese rights to The Vagina Monologues by Eve Ensler, and performing the show to popular acclaim in the Lisbon area of Portugal.

== Acting career ==
Sergeant started her television acting career in 1979, at the age of 9, in a series of 12 episodes called Histórias com Pés e Cabeça (Head and foot stories). She then played in a television adaptation of the novel Os Maias by Eça de Queirós. In 1982, she participated in the series Arco Íris (Rainbow). In 1988, she played her first big role, as Rosarinho in the soap opera Passerelle, written by Rosa Lobato de Faria and Ana Zanatti. She also had a small role in Franco Zeffirelli's Young Toscanini, released in 1988. Returning to Eça de Queirós adaptations on Portuguese television, she was in the miniseries O Mandarim in 1990.

Sergeant continued to work on television throughout the following decades. In 1992 and 1993, she participated in the soap opera Cinzas on the state broadcaster RTP and also appeared in films, including Aqui d'El Rei directed by António-Pedro Vasconcelos. Further soap operas followed and she also appeared on television performing an erotic dance with the architect of Portugal's Carnation Revolution, Otelo Saraiva de Carvalho. She became known for playing the role of the evil Vera Antunes in the soap opera Fúria de Viver (2002). In the same year she participated in the Portuguese reality-show Big Brother Famosos 1.

Returning to the theatre, Sergeant played in O Romance da Raposa in 2003, premiered in November 2003 at the Teatro São Luiz in Lisbon. In 2004, she performed in a Brazilian soap opera for TV Globo, when she met the Brazilian actor Cassiano Carneiro. The couple had a daughter, who was born in 2005. They married in 2008 and their separation was announced by Sergeant in 2020. In 2006, she was in the 3rd series of the long-running Portuguese soap opera, Morangos com Açúcar (Strawberries with sugar), playing a drug addict, and was also in the 7th series, when she played the mother of two troubled children. After further performances in soap operas, Sergeant returned to the theatre with the Teatro do Bairro, before returning to further soap opera and film roles.

== Private life ==
In September 2020, Sergeant was interviewed on television for a programme called "Sex 100 Taboos". In this, she talked about masturbation and about the fact that she had had a relationship with a woman. This attracted considerable attention from the Portuguese media.

== Awards ==
- Sergeant won the Best Supporting Actress award at the Portuguese Academy of Cinema 2014 Sophia Awards, for her performance in the film Bairro.
