= Kelly Bailey (actress) =

Portuguese actress and model

Kelly Ribeiro Bailey
- Born: Kelly Ribeiro Bailey; 1997 or 1998 (age 27–28)
- Occupations: Actress, model
- Years active: 2015–present

Kelly Maria Ribeiro Bailey is a British-Portuguese actress and model.

== Biography ==
Bailey's father is English and her mother is Portuguese.

In an appearance on the watch.tm podcast, she stated that her full name is Kelly Maria Ribeiro Bailey, which she noted is not widely known.

In 2018 she participated in her first film, having the leading role in Portuguese production "Linhas de Sangue".

She played the character of Bruna in the 2023 Netflix original Turn of the Tide.
