= Golpe de Sorte season 1 =

Golpe de Sorte
- Season 1
- Starring: Maria João Abreu; Dânia Neto; Jorge Corrula
- No. of episodes: 27

Release
- Original network: SIC
- Original release: 27 May – 28 June 2019

Season chronology
- Next → Season 2

The first season of Golpe de Sorte (Lucky Break) began airing on SIC 27 May 2019 and ended on 28 June 2019. The season one of the series stars Maria João Abreu, Dânia Neto and Jorge Corrula.

== Plot ==
Céu (Maria João Abreu) is a woman who sells fruit in a market and is surrounded by a maelstrom when she wins Euromilhões.

Bruno (Ângelo Rodrigues) is one of his sons with whom he shares that moment. But Heaven has a secret. When she was only 16, she became pregnant and gave birth to a boy. Since he could not create it, he gave it to a couple of emigrants who left for France.

Leonor (Diana Chaves) is the daughter of Fernando Alves Craveiro (Rogério Samora), the businessman who was deceived by Caio (Jorge Corrula) and Sílvia (Dânia Neto) who are two had met in an orphanage in the past and was killed in a car accident shortly after learning that he had the company in bankruptcy. Leonor wants to do justice by her own hands, and she also sets up a meticulous and well-designed plan to unmask them.

== Cast ==
=== Main cast ===
Actor/Actress	Characters
Maria João Abreu	Maria do Céu Garcia
Dânia Neto	Sílvia Mira/Miriam Barbosa Sousa Vale
Jorge Corrula	Caio Amaral/Jorge Montalvão
Diana Chaves	Leonor Alves Craveiro
Isabela Valadeiro	Telma Garcia
Ângelo Rodrigues	Bruno Garcia
Manuela Maria	Preciosa Toledo
José Raposo	José Luís Toledo
Rui Mendes	Natário Garcia
Carmen Santos	Lúcia Garcia
Carolina Carvalho	Jéssica Toledo

=== Recurrent Cast ===
Actor/Actress	Characters
Vítor Norte	Horácio Toledo
Henriqueta Maya	Cremilde Reis
Helena Laureano	Rosanne Toledo
Rosa do Canto	Amália Reis
Ana Bustorff	Madre Rosário
Ana Guiomar	Patrícia Cruz
João Paulo Rodrigues	Justino «Tino» Sanganha
Oceana Basílio	Teresa Dantas
Diogo Amaral	Padre Aníbal Dantas
Pedro Laginha	Carlos Alberto Nobrega
Duarte Gomes	Cláudio Toledo
Cecília Henriques	Graciete Pompeu
António Camelier	Ricardo Assunção
João Paulo Sousa	Xavier Reis
Sara Norte	Branca Lucena
Inês Monteiro	Cíntia Novais
Adriane Garcia	Kelly Lazzaro
Elsa Valentim	Eugénia Alves Craveiro

=== Guest cast ===
Actor/Actress	Characters
Rogério Samora	Fernando Alves Craveiro
Marques d'Arede	Artur

=== Guest Star Cast ===
Actor/Actress	Characters	Episode Number
Cristina Ferreira	Herself	Episode 3
Ana Malhoa	Herself	Episódio 22
Marco Paulo	Himself	Episode 27

== Episodes ==
No. overall	No. in season	Title	Directed by	Written by	Original release date	Portugal viewers (millions)
1	1	"Episode 1"	Carlos Dante and António Gonçalo	Vera Sacramento	27 May 2019	1.36
Maria do Céu remembers the moment when she abandoned her own son. Bruno believes that the mother won the Euromillions.
2	2	"Episode 2"	Carlos Dante and António Gonçalo	Vera Sacramento	28 May 2019	1.30
Maria do Céu discovers that she is Euromillionaire!
3	3	"Episode 3"	Carlos Dante and António Gonçalo	Vera Sacramento	29 May 2019	1.16
Alvorinha stops to see Maria do Céu in Programa da Cristina. Guest star: Cristina Ferreira as herself
4	4	"Episode 4"	Carlos Dante and António Gonçalo	Vera Sacramento	30 May 2019	1.03
Sílvia arrives at Alvorinha and is determined to stay!
5	5	"Episode 5"	Carlos Dante and António Gonçalo	Vera Sacramento	31 May 2019	1.05
Sílvia presents herself as Miriam to the Garcia to revolutionize the palace of Maria do Céu.
6	6	"Episode 6"	Carlos Dante and António Gonçalo	Vera Sacramento	3 June 2019	1.16
Maria do Céu changes her look and is unrecognizable!
7	7	"Episode 7"	Carlos Dante and António Gonçalo	Vera Sacramento	4 June 2019	1.10
Maria do Céu makes an ultimatum to Preciosa!
8	8	"Episode 8"	Carlos Dante and António Gonçalo	Vera Sacramento	5 June 2019	1.09
Preciosa tries to get in touch with those responsible for the disappearance of the son of Céu!
9	9	"Episode 9"	Carlos Dante and António Gonçalo	Vera Sacramento	6 June 2019	1.19
Preciosa marks a meeting between Maria do Céu and the couple who stayed with her son.
10	10	"Episode 10"	Carlos Dante and António Gonçalo	Vera Sacramento	7 June 2019	1.08
Céu prepares to meet the couple who stole his son!
11	11	"Episode 11"	Carlos Dante and António Gonçalo	Vera Sacramento	10 June 2019	1.19
Priest Aníbal saves Teresa from committing madness.
12	12	"Episode 12"	Carlos Dante and António Gonçalo	Vera Sacramento	11 June 2019	1.09
Telma is abducted during the Benefit Gala.
13	13	"Episode 13"	Carlos Dante and António Gonçalo	Vera Sacramento	12 June 2019	0.87
Caio pretends to have saved Telma and is considered the true hero of the story.
14	14	"Episode 14"	Carlos Dante and António Gonçalo	Vera Sacramento	13 June 2019	1.03
Graciete tells Maria do Céu that her personal coach Miriam has another name.
15	15	"Episode 15"	Carlos Dante and António Gonçalo	Vera Sacramento	14 June 2019	0.97
José Luís makes a revelation to Maria do Céu that leaves her in shock!
16	16	"Episode 16 and 17a"	Carlos Dante and António Gonçalo	Vera Sacramento	17 June 2019	1.09
17a	17a	"Episode 16 and 17a"	Carlos Dante and António Gonçalo	Vera Sacramento	17 June 2019	1.09
Miriam suggests to Céu that she give him a power of attorney to deal with the boring bureaucracies.
17b	17b	"Episode 17b and 18"	Carlos Dante and António Gonçalo	Vera Sacramento	18 June 2019	1.19
18	18	"Episode 17b and 18"	Carlos Dante and António Gonçalo	Vera Sacramento	18 June 2019	1.19
The plan of Preciosa advances and Maria do Céu believes that she is within hours of meeting her son Rafael.
19	19	"Episode 19"	Carlos Dante and António Gonçalo	Vera Sacramento	19 June 2019	1.10
Cremilde catches Amália and Horácio in flagrante.
20	20	"Episode 20"	Carlos Dante and António Gonçalo	Vera Sacramento	20 June 2019	1.04
Caio catches Preciosa in flagrante to bribe Hélder and Rosa.
21	21	"Episode 21"	Carlos Dante and António Gonçalo	Vera Sacramento	21 June 2019	1.05
Preciosa is left alone and without the support of Cremilde and Lucia!
22	22	"Episode 22"	Carlos Dante and António Gonçalo	Vera Sacramento	22 June 2019	0.94
Xavier implies with Kelly the friend of Cíntia that applied for assistant of kitchen in the restaurant. Guest star: Ana Malhoa as herself
23	23	"Episode 23"	Carlos Dante and António Gonçalo	Vera Sacramento	24 June 2019	1.13
Bruno decides to suspend his marriage to Jéssica!
24	24	"Episode 24"	Carlos Dante and António Gonçalo	Vera Sacramento	25 June 2019	1.17
Graciete takes a picture of Miriam's passport and sends it to Ricardo!
25	25	"Episode 25"	Carlos Dante and António Gonçalo	Vera Sacramento	26 June 2019	1.23
Jéssica starts to lose blood and Bruno takes her to the hospital!
26	26	"Episode 26"	Carlos Dante and António Gonçalo	Vera Sacramento	27 June 2019	1.12
Bruno and Jéssica, unwittingly, end up bachelor partying together.
27	27	"Episode 27"	Carlos Dante and António Gonçalo	Vera Sacramento	28 June 2019	1.10
Bruno discovers that Jessica betrayed him to Tino. Caio shoots Ricardo but the shot hits Maria do Céu who is unconscious on the ground. Leonor changes her look and arrives to take revenge on Caio and Sílvia, titled Alice, the new doctor at the health center. Guest star: Marco Paulo as himself
