= Golpe de Sorte season 2 =

Golpe de Sorte
- Season 2
- Starring: Maria João Abreu; Dânia Neto; Jorge Corrula; Diana Chaves
- No. of episodes: 52

Release
- Original network: SIC
- Original release: 1 July – 9 September 2019

Season chronology
- ← Previous; Season 1 Next → Season 3

The second season of Golpe de Sorte (Lucky Break) began airing on SIC on 1 July 2019 and ended on 9 September 2019. The season two of the series stars Maria João Abreu, Dânia Neto, Jorge Corrula and Diana Chaves.

== Plot ==
Crime in Alvorinha! On the floor of the wide, one body. People around. We realize it's our Euromillionaire. Panic! The Garcia are in shock, crying for help ... until Carlos (Pedro Laginha) and Alice (Diana Chaves) arrive, who introduces himself to Teresa (Oceana Basílio) husband for the first time. They both try to save Céu's (Maria João Abreu) life from heaven. Will they be able to avoid tragedy?

Tragic, little Beatriz (Matilde Serrão) life. Frightened, she is in the Nobrega's house to ask Teresa to protect her from her parents. Priest Aníbal (Diogo Amaral), Teresa and Claudio (Duarte Gomes) try to solve the drama of the girl, calling Dalia (Andreia Dinis) and Serafim (Frederico Barata) but the conversation does not go well. The suspicious behavior of Bia's parents suggests a dark past...

With the guilts of the past, Jessica (Carolina Carvalho) is desolate after seeing the marriage broken. The father José Luis (José Raposo) tries to comfort her but it is Preciosa (Manuela Maria), the grandmother of the bride, who ends up having the right words. Nothing like a person full of shadows to understand each other's sins. Especially if it's a Toledo...

The Garcia saw an ambulance take Céu to the Hospital. Meanwhile, the police arrive and start questioning those present. The first is Ricardo (António Camelier), who tries to warn them about the villains Sílvia (Dânia Neto) and Caio (Jorge Corrula) but, without proof, ends up pointing the focus of guilt to himself. Realizing that they have nothing against her, Sílvia, who still has no passport, finally insinuates to the police that the abduction of Telma (Isabela Valadeiro) was orchestrated by... Ricardo. In this ping pong game, who can win?

Who does not want to lose the track to Tino (João Paulo Rodrigues) is José Luís who goes to the arrumos room to confront the lover of the daughter but finds an empty room. Tino, humbled by the situation, had fled far, eventually finding and being comforted by... Branca (Sara Norte). What can come out of the relationship of these two?

After a long time in the expectation, the Garcia know by Bruno (Ângelo Rodrigues) that the euromillionaire is stabilized thanks to the intervention of the new doctor, Alice Barreto. Heaven finally goes to the palace but... can not speak. Did our protagonist remain forever silent?

In the last plane, we see a hand with Sílvia's passport. Who could be maneuvering in silence?

== Cast ==
=== Main cast ===
Actor/Actress	Characters
Maria João Abreu	Maria do Céu Garcia
Dânia Neto	Sílvia Mira/Miriam Barbosa Sousa Vale
Jorge Corrula	Caio Amaral/Jorge Montalvão
Diana Chaves	Leonor Alves Craveiro/Alice Barreto
Isabela Valadeiro	Telma Garcia
Ângelo Rodrigues	Bruno Garcia
Manuela Maria	Preciosa Toledo
José Raposo	José Luís Toledo
Rui Mendes	Natário Garcia
Carmen Santos	Lúcia Garcia
Carolina Carvalho	Jéssica Toledo

=== Recurrent Cast ===
Actor/Actress	Characters
Vítor Norte	Horácio Toledo
Henriqueta Maya	Cremilde Reis
Helena Laureano	Rosanne Toledo
Rosa do Canto	Amália Reis
Ana Bustorff	Madre Rosário
Ana Guiomar	Patrícia Cruz
João Paulo Rodrigues	Justino «Tino» Sanganha
Oceana Basílio	Teresa Dantas
Diogo Amaral	Padre Aníbal Dantas
Pedro Laginha	Carlos Alberto Nobrega
Duarte Gomes	Cláudio Toledo
Cecília Henriques	Graciete Pompeu
António Camelier	Ricardo Assunção
João Paulo Sousa	Xavier Reis
José Carlos Pereira	Vítor «Vitinho»
Miguel Raposo	Duarte Godinho/Vasco
Ricardo Carriço	Gonçalo Vasques
Sara Norte	Branca Lucena
Inês Monteiro	Cíntia Novais
Adriane Garcia	Kelly Lazzaro
Elsa Valentim	Eugénia Alves Craveiro
Paulo Matos	Alfredo Nogueira

=== Guest Star Cast ===
Actor/Actress	Characters	Episode Number
Cláudio Ramos	Himself	Episode 34
Toy	Himself	Episode 46
Maria Botelho Moniz	Jogador	Episode 50

== Episodes ==
No. overall	No. in season	Title	Directed by	Written by	Original release date	Portugal viewers (millions)
28	1	"Episode 28"	Carlos Dante and António Gonçalo	Vera Sacramento	1 July 2019	1.21
Alice saves the life of Maria do Céu who returns to the palace without being able to speak!
29	2	"Episode 29"	Carlos Dante and António Gonçalo	Vera Sacramento	2 July 2019	1.22
Preciosa already knows the truth about Sílvia but promises to help her if she receives something in return!
30	3	"Episode 30"	Carlos Dante and António Gonçalo	Vera Sacramento	3 July 2019	1.17
Ricardo decides to tell the whole truth about Caio and Sílvia when he receives a threat and gives up the idea!
31	4	"Episode 31"	Carlos Dante and António Gonçalo	Vera Sacramento	4 July 2019	1.20
Maria do Céu decides to give up the fortune which leaves the family in shock!
32	5	"Episode 32"	Carlos Dante and António Gonçalo	Vera Sacramento	5 July 2019	0.99
Duarte, at the command of Caio and Sílvia, pretends to be the missing son of Maria do Céu!
33	6	"Episode 33"	Carlos Dante and António Gonçalo	Vera Sacramento	8 July 2019	1.22
Maria do Céu is radiant with the arrival of Vasco, but for reasons of confidence she wants to confirm that he is her son!
34	7	"Episode 34"	Carlos Dante and António Gonçalo	Vera Sacramento	9 July 2019	N/A
Vasco gets nervous with the DNA test but Sílvia/Miriam promises to handle everything!
35	8	"Episode 35"	Carlos Dante and António Gonçalo	Vera Sacramento	10 July 2019	1.04
Horácio begins to deal in the art of politics.
36	9	"Episode 36"	Carlos Dante and António Gonçalo	Vera Sacramento	11 July 2019	N/A
Vasco pretends he has nowhere to go to be in Maria do Céu's palace. Will Vasco be in Maria do Céu's palace?
37	10	"Episode 37"	Carlos Dante and António Gonçalo	Vera Sacramento	12 July 2019	1.04
Maria do Céu brings the whole family together to unravel the results of Vasco's DNA test.
38	11	"Episode 38"	Carlos Dante and António Gonçalo	Vera Sacramento	15 July 2019	1.14
Teresa and Cláudio kiss each other.
39	12	"Episode 39"	Carlos Dante and António Gonçalo	Vera Sacramento	16 July 2019	1.16
Caio spends the night with Alice.
40	13	"Episode 40"	Carlos Dante and António Gonçalo	Vera Sacramento	17 July 2019	1.20
Tino talks about Jéssica and Bruno loses his mind!
41	14	"Episode 41"	Carlos Dante and António Gonçalo	Vera Sacramento	18 July 2019	1.10
Sílvia catches Caio in bed with Alice.
42	15	"Episode 42"	Carlos Dante and António Gonçalo	Vera Sacramento	19 July 2019	1.05
Bruno and Miriam kiss each other!
43	16	"Episode 43"	Carlos Dante and António Gonçalo	Vera Sacramento	22 July 2019	N/A
Carlos assaults Cláudio ahead of Teresa!
44	17	"Episode 44"	Carlos Dante and António Gonçalo	Vera Sacramento	23 July 2019	N/A
Sílvia threatens Caio with a weapon!
45	18	"Episode 45"	Carlos Dante and António Gonçalo	Vera Sacramento	24 July 2019	N/A
Leonor implements the plan to catch the villains: Caio and Sílvia!
46	19	"Episode 46"	Carlos Dante and António Gonçalo	Vera Sacramento	25 July 2019	N/A
Ricardo and Alice/Leonor agree to unite to unmask Caio and Sílvia!
47	20	"Episode 47"	Carlos Dante and António Gonçalo	Vera Sacramento	26 July 2019	N/A
Miriam and Bruno get involved!
48	21	"Episode 48"	Carlos Dante and António Gonçalo	Vera Sacramento	29 July 2019	N/A
Caio threatens Ricardo with a knife!
49	22	"Episode 49"	Carlos Dante and António Gonçalo	Vera Sacramento	30 July 2019	N/A
Bruno assaults Vasco.
50	23	"Episode 50"	Carlos Dante and António Gonçalo	Vera Sacramento	31 July 2019	N/A
Tired of the environment in the village, Bruno leaves home!
51	24	"Episode 51"	Carlos Dante and António Gonçalo	Vera Sacramento	1 August 2019	N/A
Amália confronts Horácio.
52	25	"Episode 52"	Carlos Dante and António Gonçalo	Vera Sacramento	2 August 2019	N/A
Sílvia discovers that Leonor is deceiving Caio.
53	26	"Episode 53"	Carlos Dante and António Gonçalo	Vera Sacramento	5 August 2019	N/A
Natário tries to make Bruno make up with Vasco.
54	27	"Episode 54"	Carlos Dante and António Gonçalo	Vera Sacramento	6 August 2019	N/A
Leonor gets the information he wanted so much: Vasco is not a child of Céu!
55	28	"Episode 55"	Carlos Dante and António Gonçalo	Vera Sacramento	7 August 2019	N/A
Jéssica hides from Bruno and puts the whole dawn looking for you!
56	29	"Episode 56"	Carlos Dante and António Gonçalo	Vera Sacramento	8 August 2019	N/A
Jéssica, Bruno and Tino do DNA testing!
57	30	"Episode 57"	Carlos Dante and António Gonçalo	Vera Sacramento	9 August 2019	N/A
Jorge sees Serafim mistreating Beatriz and beats him!
58	31	"Episode 58"	Carlos Dante and António Gonçalo	Vera Sacramento	12 August 2019	N/A
Ricardo discovers that Caio, Sílvia and Vasco already knew each other!
59	32	"Episode 59"	Carlos Dante and António Gonçalo	Vera Sacramento	13 August 2019	N/A
Leonor/Alice has a plan to catch fake Detective Vasques.
60	33	"Episode 60"	Carlos Dante and António Gonçalo	Vera Sacramento	14 August 2019	N/A
Horácio or Alfredo run for election in an iron fist!
61	34	"Episode 61"	Carlos Dante and António Gonçalo	Vera Sacramento	15 August 2019	N/A
Cláudio Ramos appears in Alvorinha to pay a visit to Maria do Céu! Guest star: Cláudio Ramos as himself
62	35	"Episode 62"	Carlos Dante and António Gonçalo	Vera Sacramento	16 August 2019	N/A
Frightened by the threats of Dr. Carlos, Patrícia vent with Claudio who decides to take action!
63	36	"Episode 63"	Carlos Dante and António Gonçalo	Vera Sacramento	19 August 2019	N/A
Does Vasques tell the truth about Caio and Silvia?
64	37	"Episode 64"	Carlos Dante and António Gonçalo	Vera Sacramento	20 August 2019	N/A
Miriam catches Bruno and Jessica kissing and ends everything with the son of the Euromillionaire!
65	38	"Episode 65"	Carlos Dante and António Gonçalo	Vera Sacramento	21 August 2019	N/A
Jessica's baby DNA test result arrives at the boarding house and will end up in Miriam/Sílvia's hands!
66	39	"Episode 66"	Carlos Dante and António Gonçalo	Vera Sacramento	22 August 2019	N/A
Teresa has surgery scheduled in Paris and is filled with hope, will she ever see again?
67	40	"Episode 67"	Carlos Dante and António Gonçalo	Vera Sacramento	23 August 2019	N/A
Maria do Céu convinces Bruno to return home!
68	41	"Episode 68"	Carlos Dante and António Gonçalo	Vera Sacramento	26 August 2019	N/A
Caio and Sílvia manage to get Ricardo out of their investigation!
69	42	"Episode 69"	Carlos Dante and António Gonçalo	Vera Sacramento	27 August 2019	N/A
Bruno suspects that Vasco is not his brother and has a plan to find out the truth!
70	43	"Episode 70"	Carlos Dante and António Gonçalo	Vera Sacramento	28 August 2019	N/A
Ricardo tells Alice/Leonor that Bruno will find out the truth about Vasco and the doctor is pleased.
71	44	"Episode 71"	Carlos Dante and António Gonçalo	Vera Sacramento	29 August 2019	N/A
Sílvia has a plan to get rid of Vasco and Detective Vasques!
72	45	"Episode 72"	Carlos Dante and António Gonçalo	Vera Sacramento	30 August 2019	N/A
Bruno reveals to his family that Vasco is an impostor!
73	46	"Episode 73"	Carlos Dante and António Gonçalo	Vera Sacramento	1 September 2019	N/A
Patrícia tells Teresa that she went blind because of Dr. Carlos! Guest star: Toy as himself
74	47	"Episode 74"	Carlos Dante and António Gonçalo	Vera Sacramento	2 September 2019	N/A
Maria do Céu reveals to the family that she and José Luís are together!
75	48	"Episode 75"	Carlos Dante and António Gonçalo	Vera Sacramento	3 September 2019	N/A
Céu decides she will keep part of her fortune at home and leaves Sílvia/Miriam out of her mind!
76	49	"Episode 76"	Carlos Dante and António Gonçalo	Vera Sacramento	4 September 2019	N/A
Caio and Sílvia manage to transfer the 60 million of Maria do Céu to they account!
77	50	"Episode 77"	Carlos Dante and António Gonçalo	Vera Sacramento	5 September 2019	N/A
José Luis asks Maria do Céu to marry him!
78	51	"Episode 78"	Carlos Dante and António Gonçalo	Vera Sacramento	6 September 2019	N/A
Telma is attacked by a woman who follows her reality show. Guest star: Maria Botelho Moniz as Jogador
79	52	"Episode 79"	Carlos Dante and António Gonçalo	Vera Sacramento	8 September 2019 (Part 1) 9 September 2019 (Part 2)	TBD (Part 1) 1.51 (Part 2)
Cíntia suffers an unexpected surprise! (Part 1) Madre Rosário reveals that Caio is the son of Maria do Céu! (Part 2)
