= Golpe de Sorte season 3 =

Golpe de Sorte
- Season 3
- Starring: Maria João Abreu; Dânia Neto; Jorge Corrula; Diana Chaves
- No. of episodes: 43

Release
- Original network: SIC
- Original release: 15 September – 10 November 2019

Season chronology
- ← Previous; Season 2 Next → Season 4

The third season of Golpe de Sorte (Lucky Break) began airing on SIC on 15 September 2019 and ended on 10 November 2019. The season three of the series stars Maria João Abreu, Dânia Neto, Jorge Corrula and Diana Chaves.

== Plot ==
Persecution in Alvorinha! When the truth is finally revealed and police sirens are heard, Miriam (Dânia Neto) takes advantage of everyone's distraction and sets off. Bruno (Ângelo Rodrigues) warns the agents that the villain has fled by car but is it still time to stop Silvia?

Heaven's head doesn't stop with so much important information all at once. The euro-millionaire must warn the police that Miriam has taken her 10 million euros while concealing that agents tell her that Caio (Jorge Corrula) is innocent. When Heaven confronts Madre Rosário (Ana Bustorff) about the truth, she admits to the Euro-millionaire that Caio is indeed her son but that she intends to take him to Lisbon. However, Maria do Céu Garcia's (Maria João Abreu) idea is quite different...

Different is what happens in the house of Nobrega. Suddenly, it is Carlos who is the most. With Claudio (Duarte Gomes) injured, Teresa (Oceana Basilio) is taking care of Horace's son and expels the Director of the Health Center from his own home. Did this submission story finally come to an end?

With the end of the scammers, the Garcia remember all the blows of Silvia and Caio, dumbfounded. As they connect all the dots and realize the wickedness of the villains' actions, the whole family begins to hate Caio and Silvia... except Heaven, who seems to want to forgive her son...

Padre Aníbal (Diogo Amaral) seems to want to find an explanation for certain behaviors of Cíntia (Inês Monteiro) and seeks with Kelly (Adriane Garcia) the revelation of some secrets of Amália's (Rosa do Canto) cousin but the Brazilian is not. shows much available to unravel confessions. Will the priest ever know the whole story of the suffering Cintia?

Suffered is Caio with Madre Rosário. When she looks for him in the pension room, Heaven's son does not accept that throughout these years Rosario has not told him what he knew about his origin. Lost, Caio expels Madre Rosário and turns to drink...

Alice (Diana Chaves) can take it no longer and turns to Teresa, telling her everything she has been thinking over the last months: that Carlos is sick and has to be treated but also has to be stopped for his unacceptable behavior. The still wife of the Health Center Director agrees but asks them to give her some breathing room...

Heaven is also looking to breathe when she meets her friend "more than blood" Amália and tells her everything that happened and the discovery that Gaius is his son. After this very intimate conversation, the Euro-millionaire tells her son that she is willing to forgive him if he forgives her. But even more surprising is when Maria do Céu makes an announcement to the Garcia family that will leave everyone with their mouths open...

== Cast ==
=== Main cast ===
Actor/Actress	Characters
Maria João Abreu	Maria do Céu Garcia
Dânia Neto	Sílvia Mira/Madre Dolores
Jorge Corrula	Caio Amaral
Diana Chaves	Leonor Alves Craveiro/Alice Barreto
Isabela Valadeiro	Telma Garcia
Ângelo Rodrigues	Bruno Garcia
Manuela Maria	Preciosa Toledo
José Raposo	José Luís Toledo
Rui Mendes	Natário Garcia
Carmen Santos	Lúcia Garcia
Carolina Carvalho	Jéssica Toledo

=== Recurrent Cast ===
Actor/Actress	Characters
Vítor Norte	Horácio Toledo
Henriqueta Maya	Cremilde Reis
Helena Laureano	Rosanne Toledo
Rosa do Canto	Amália Reis
Ana Bustorff	Madre Rosário
Ana Guiomar	Patrícia Cruz
João Paulo Rodrigues	Justino «Tino» Sanganha
Oceana Basílio	Teresa Dantas
Diogo Amaral	Padre Aníbal Dantas
Duarte Gomes	Cláudio Toledo
Cecília Henriques	Graciete Pompeu
João Paulo Sousa	Xavier Reis
José Carlos Pereira	Vitinho
Sara Norte	Branca Lucena
Inês Monteiro	Cíntia Novais
Adriane Garcia	Kelly Lazzaro
Elsa Valentim	Eugénia Alves Craveiro

=== Guest cast ===
Actor/Actress	Characters
António Camelier	Ricardo Assunção
Pedro Laginha	Carlos Alberto Nobrega
Paulo Matos	Alfredo Nogueira

=== Guest Star Cast ===
Actor/Actress	Characters	Episode Number
João Baião	Himself	Episode 35

== Episodes ==
No. overall	No. in season	Title	Directed by	Written by	Original release date	Portugal viewers (millions)
80	1	"Episode 80"	Carlos Dante and António Gonçalo	Vera Sacramento	15 September 2019	1.30
Céu tells the family that Jorge is his son!
81	2	"Episode 81"	Carlos Dante and António Gonçalo	Vera Sacramento	16 September 2019	1.22
Maria do Céu and Madre Rosário confront each other!
82	3	"Episode 82"	Carlos Dante and António Gonçalo	Vera Sacramento	17 September 2019	1.25
Ricardo is found dead!
83	4	"Episode 83"	Carlos Dante and António Gonçalo	Vera Sacramento	18 September 2019	N/A
Caio is the prime suspect in Ricardo's death!
84	5	"Episode 84"	Carlos Dante and António Gonçalo	Vera Sacramento	19 September 2019	N/A
Caio and Leonor are interrogated by police.
85	6	"Episode 85"	Carlos Dante and António Gonçalo	Vera Sacramento	20 September 2019	N/A
Céu and José Luís announce the results of Caio's DNA test to the family.
86	7	"Episode 86"	Carlos Dante and António Gonçalo	Vera Sacramento	22 September 2019	N/A
Sílvia disguises herself as a nun at the institution of Madre Rosário.
87	8	"Episode 87"	Carlos Dante and António Gonçalo	Vera Sacramento	23 September 2019	N/A
Maria do Céu finds out that Leonor lied to her!
88	9	"Episode 88"	Carlos Dante and António Gonçalo	Vera Sacramento	24 September 2019	N/A
The Judiciary Police appears at the institution with a search warrant!
89	10	"Episode 89"	Carlos Dante and António Gonçalo	Vera Sacramento	25 September 2019	N/A
Leonor receives a visit from her mother who is shocked to discover that her daughter is dating Caio!
90	11	"Episode 90"	Carlos Dante and António Gonçalo	Vera Sacramento	26 September 2019	N/A
Céu and Amália get closer!
91	12	"Episode 91"	Carlos Dante and António Gonçalo	Vera Sacramento	27 September 2019	N/A
Bruno and Xavier present the accounts of the Bohemian to Céu!
92	13	"Episode 92"	Carlos Dante and António Gonçalo	Vera Sacramento	30 September 2019	N/A
Cremilde tells Branca who is the real Preciosa!
93	14	"Episode 93"	Carlos Dante and António Gonçalo	Vera Sacramento	1 October 2019	N/A
Amália tries to convince Xavier to accept the job in Porto!
94	15	"Episode 94"	Carlos Dante and António Gonçalo	Vera Sacramento	2 October 2019	N/A
Preciosa tells José Luís and Horácio the truth about Branca's mother!
95	16	"Episode 95"	Carlos Dante and António Gonçalo	Vera Sacramento	3 October 2019	N/A
Jessica is getting ready to give birth!
96	17	"Episode 96"	Carlos Dante and António Gonçalo	Vera Sacramento	4 October 2019	N/A
Bruno feels bad on his mother's wedding day!
97	18	"Episode 97"	Carlos Dante and António Gonçalo	Vera Sacramento	7 October 2019	N/A
Leonor and Cláudio inform Bruno about his health.
98	19	"Episode 98"	Carlos Dante and António Gonçalo	Vera Sacramento	8 October 2019	N/A
Silvia is panicked when she sees Father Olavo!
99	20	"Episode 99"	Carlos Dante and António Gonçalo	Vera Sacramento	9 October 2019	N/A
Céu and José Luís get married!
100	21	"Episode 100"	Carlos Dante and António Gonçalo	Vera Sacramento	10 October 2019	N/A
The glass of water is still in the mansion, but the concern for Bruno is enormous!
101	22	"Episode 101"	Carlos Dante and António Gonçalo	Vera Sacramento	11 October 2019	N/A
Xavier discovers that Horácio is your father!
102	23	"Episode 102"	Carlos Dante and António Gonçalo	Vera Sacramento	14 October 2019	N/A
Xavier leaves home and seeks comfort in Patricia!
103	24	"Episode 103"	Carlos Dante and António Gonçalo	Vera Sacramento	15 October 2019	N/A
Caio is the only donor compatible with Bruno. Will he save his brother?
104	25	"Episode 104"	Carlos Dante and António Gonçalo	Vera Sacramento	16 October 2019	N/A
Hesitant in the decision to help Bruno, Caio asks Madre for advice!
105	26	"Episode 105"	Carlos Dante and António Gonçalo	Vera Sacramento	17 October 2019	N/A
Caio blackmails Maria do Céu: the fortune in exchange for Bruno's life!
106	27	"Episode 106"	Carlos Dante and António Gonçalo	Vera Sacramento	18 October 2019	N/A
Caio recalls the abuse he suffered as a child, thinks about the blackmail he did to Maria do Céu and you feel confused.
107	28	"Episode 107"	Carlos Dante and António Gonçalo	Vera Sacramento	21 October 2019	N/A
Caio meets Sílvia before the surgery that will save Bruno's life!
108	29	"Episode 108"	Carlos Dante and António Gonçalo	Vera Sacramento	22 October 2019	N/A
Bruno is taken for surgery. Is Céu's son at risk for his life?
109	30	"Episode 109"	Carlos Dante and António Gonçalo	Vera Sacramento	23 October 2019	N/A
Céu keeps his word and prepares to leave the palace, together with his family.
110	31	"Episode 110"	Carlos Dante and António Gonçalo	Vera Sacramento	24 October 2019	N/A
Xavier refuses to continue working in the Bohemian!
111	32	"Episode 111"	Carlos Dante and António Gonçalo	Vera Sacramento	25 October 2019	N/A
Does Caio want Graciete to continue working on the palace?
112	33	"Episode 112"	Carlos Dante and António Gonçalo	Vera Sacramento	28 October 2019	N/A
Tino has a great idea to help Maria do Céu!
113	34	"Episode 113"	Carlos Dante and António Gonçalo	Vera Sacramento	29 October 2019	N/A
Everyone finds out the truth: After all, Jessica's son’s father is Bruno! How will Tino react?
114	35	"Episode 114"	Carlos Dante and António Gonçalo	Vera Sacramento	30 October 2019	N/A
João Baião is in Alvorinha! What is the reason? Guest star: João Baião as himself
115	36	"Episode 115"	Carlos Dante and António Gonçalo	Vera Sacramento	31 October 2019	N/A
Caio confronts Alice with the role that proves she is pregnant. Will she tell the whole truth?
116	37	"Episode 116"	Carlos Dante and António Gonçalo	Vera Sacramento	1 November 2019	N/A
Caio takes Leonor to the institution and introduces Madre Rosário. Does she recognize her?
117	38	"Episode 117"	Carlos Dante and António Gonçalo	Vera Sacramento	4 November 2019	N/A
Alice begins to realize that something is not right. Did he lose the baby?
118	39	"Episode 118"	Carlos Dante and António Gonçalo	Vera Sacramento	5 November 2019	N/A
Before Caio's anguish and anger, Céu does not hesitate to give him some comfort and love!
119	40	"Episode 119"	Carlos Dante and António Gonçalo	Vera Sacramento	6 November 2019	N/A
Jéssica proposes Bruno in marriage!
120	41	"Episode 120"	Carlos Dante and António Gonçalo	Vera Sacramento	7 November 2019	N/A
Madre Rosário tells Caio that Alice is not who she claims to be!
121	42	"Episode 121"	Carlos Dante and António Gonçalo	Vera Sacramento	8 November 2019	N/A
Teresa is beaten and Carlos then kills himself!
122	43	"Episode 122"	Carlos Dante and António Gonçalo	Vera Sacramento	10 November 2019	N/A
Madre shoots to kill against Céu, when Caio meddles and receives the shot.
