= Golpe de Sorte =

Portuguese TV series

- English poster for distribution
- Starring: Maria João Abreu; Dânia Neto; Jorge Corrula; Diana Chaves (seasons 2-3); Pedro Barroso (season 4); Madalena Almeida (season 4); Diogo Martins (season 4)
- Theme music composer: Rodrigo Leão
- Opening theme: "Espiral", Rodrigo Leão
- Ending theme: "Espiral", Rodrigo Leão
- Composer: Rodrigo Leão
- Country of origin: Portugal
- Original language: Portuguese
- No. of seasons: 4
- No. of episodes: 238 (list of episodes)

Original release
- Network: SIC
- Release: 27 May 2019 – 20 February 2021

Golpe de Sorte (Lucky Break) was a Portuguese series which began airing on SIC on 27 May 2019 and ended in 20 February 2021.

The series stars Maria João Abreu, Dânia Neto, Jorge Corrula, Diana Chaves (seasons 2-3), Pedro Barroso (season 4), Madalena Almeida (season 4) and Diogo Martins (season 4).

== Plot ==
The once quiet village of Alvorinha is suddenly put on the map when Maria do Céu (Maria João Abreu) wins the lottery. She is now one of the richest women in the country and everyone celebrates her victory. A hard working widow, dear to everyone in town, up until now she made a humble living selling fruit at the market, to support her two children Bruno (Ângelo Rodrigues) and Telma (Isabela Valadeiro) while helping her parents.

Telma is good-hearted but is naïve and dreams of fame. She will be ecstatic when she realizes she is rich and will be able to satisfy all her materialistic fantasies. She will fall in love with journalist Ricardo (António Camelier). Bruno is the opposite, responsible and hardworking. He will have to deal with several challenges, being the biggest girlfriend Jessica's (Carolina Carvalho) betrayal and finding out if he is the father of the child she carries.

Now that she has money, Céu's goals are to allow her family live a good life and find her missing son Rafael. As a pregnant teen the newborn was taken away from her when childhood sweetheart Zé Luís (José Raposo) and her family were manipulate by Preciosa (Manuela Maria), Zé's mother, to give up the baby for adoption.

Con artists (now Miriam (Dânia Neto) and Jorge (Jorge Corrula)) hear the news and decide their next lucky break is Maria do Céu's millions. They were raised together in a catholic foster home and became professional scammers and fortune hunters. Manipulative and masters of disguise they have been able to get away with their crimes for many years.

One of their biggest score happened in 2006, when they led Fernando Craveiro (Rogério Samora) to bankruptcy. In desperation, the businessman plans to kill the scammers, leaving a letter to his daughter Leonor (Diana Chaves), explaining everything that happened, but dies in a car accident without being able to take revenge. Leonor's world collapses with her father's death and the desire for revenge puts her on a mission to seek those who destroyed her family's life.

Thirteen years later, she finally traces them down in Alvorinha. In her new identity, she is now Alice Barreto. She will team up with Ricardo to expose the charlatans and deal with the jealousy of Miriam, as her plan of approach will be to charm Jorge.

Maria do Céu will welcome Miriam and Jorge into her world. Little does she know she is they will open a pandora's box, while burning a hole in her pocket.

== Cast ==
=== Main cast ===
Actor/Actress	Character	Season			
Actor/Actress	Character	1	2	3	4
Maria João Abreu	Maria do Céu Garcia	Main Protagonist	Main Protagonist	Main Protagonist	Main Protagonist
Dânia Neto	Sílvia Mira/Miriam Barbosa Sousa Vale/Madre Dolores	Main Antagonist	Main Antagonist	Main Antagonist	Protagonist
Dânia Neto	Andreia Mira	Absent	Absent	Absent	Main Antagonist
Jorge Corrula	Caio Amaral/Jorge Montalvã/Caio Amaral Garcia	Main Antagonist	Main Antagonist	Main Antagonist	Protagonist
Diana Chaves	Leonor Alves Craveiro/Alice Barreto	Co-Protagonist	Protagonist	Protagonist	Absent
Pedro Barroso	José Castro/José Núncio	Absent	Absent	Absent	Main Antagonist
Madalena Almeida	Lara de Jesus	Absent	Absent	Absent	Protagonist
Diogo Martins	Fábio Guerreiro	Absent	Absent	Absent	Protagonist
Manuela Maria	Preciosa Toledo	Co-Antagonist	Co-Antagonist	Co-Antagonist	Co-Protagonist
José Raposo	José Luís Toledo	Co-Protagonist	Co-Protagonist	Co-Protagonist	Co-Protagonist
Carolina Carvalho	Jéssica Toledo/Toledo Garcia	Co-Antagonist	Co-Antagonist	Co-Protagonist	Co-Protagonist
Mariana Pacheco	Rubi Ferraz	Absent	Absent	Absent	Co-Antagonist

=== Recurrent Cast ===
Actor/Actress	Character	Season			
Actor/Actress	Character	1	2	3	4
Rui Mendes	Natário Garcia	Recurrent	Recurrent	Recurrent	Recurrent
Vítor Norte	Horácio Toledo	Recurrent	Recurrent	Recurrent	Recurrent
Carmen Santos	Lúcia Garcia	Recurrent	Recurrent	Recurrent	Recurrent
Henriqueta Maya	Cremilde Reis	Recurrent	Recurrent	Recurrent	Recurrent
Helena Laureano	Rosanne Toledo	Recurrent	Recurrent	Recurrent	Recurrent
Rosa do Canto	Amália Reis	Recurrent	Recurrent	Recurrent	Recurrent
Ana Bustorff	Madre Rosário	Recurrent	Recurrent	Recurrent	Absent
Ana Guiomar	Patrícia Cruz	Recurrent	Recurrent	Recurrent	Absent
João Paulo Rodrigues	Justino «Tino» Sanganha	Recurrent	Recurrent	Recurrent	Recurrent
Oceana Basílio	Teresa Dantas	Recurrent	Recurrent	Recurrent	Absent
Diogo Amaral	Padre Aníbal Dantas	Recurrent	Recurrent	Recurrent	Absent
Pedro Laginha	Carlos Alberto Nobrega	Recurrent	Recurrent	Recurrent	Absent
Duarte Gomes	Cláudio Toledo	Recurrent	Recurrent	Recurrent	Absent
Cecília Henriques	Graciete Pompeu	Recurrent	Recurrent	Recurrent	Recurrent
António Camelier	Ricardo Assunção	Recurrent	Recurrent	Guest	Absent
João Paulo Sousa	Xavier Reis	Recurrent	Recurrent	Recurrent	Absent
José Carlos Pereira	Vítor «Vitinho»	Additional	Recurrent	Recurrent	Additional
Miguel Raposo	Duarte Godinho/Vasco	Absent	Recurrent	Absent	Additional
Ricardo Carriço	Gonçalo Vasques	Additional	Recurrent	Absent	Absent
Sara Norte	Branca Lucena	Recurrent	Recurrent	Recurrent	Additional
Inês Monteiro	Cíntia Novais	Recurrent	Recurrent	Recurrent	Recurrent
Adriane Garcia	Kelly Lazzaro	Recurrent	Recurrent	Guest	Absent
Paulo Matos	Alfredo Nogueira	Absent	Recurrent	Recurrent	Absent
Elsa Valentim	Eugénia Alves Craveiro	Recurrent	Recurrent	Recurrent	Absent
Rúben Gomes	Pedro Albuquerque	Absent	Absent	Absent	Recurrent
Martinho Silva	Nelson Farias	Absent	Absent	Absent	Recurrent
Raquel Tavares	Liliana Barroso	Absent	Absent	Absent	Recurrent
Luís Simões	Renato	Absent	Absent	Absent	Recurrent
Bernardo Lobo Faria	Paulo	Absent	Absent	Absent	Recurrent
Rui Dionisio	Rui Estrela/Guilherme Costa	Absent	Absent	Absent	Recurrent
Carolina Frias	Marina Piedade	Absent	Absent	Absent	Recurrent
Maria Ana Filipe	Alexandra «Xana» Gaspar	Absent	Absent	Absent	Recurrent
Sílvia Chiola	Sandra Nolasco	Absent	Absent	Absent	Recurrent

=== Guest cast ===
Actor/Actress	Character	Season			
Actor/Actress	Character	1	2	3	4
Rogério Samora	Fernando Alves Craveiro	Guest	Absent	Absent	Absent
Marques d'Arede	Artur Colaço	Guest	Absent	Absent	Absent
Margarida Carpinteiro	Rosa Jordão	Absent	Absent	Absent	Guest
Luís Aleluia	Padre Alexandre Bento	Absent	Absent	Absent	Guest

=== Child Cast ===
Actor/Actress	Character	Season			
Actor/Actress	Character	1	2	3	4
Elgar do Rosário	Fernando Júnior Alves Craveiro Garcia	Absent	Absent	Guest	Child
Tomás Sousa	Bruno «Bruninho» Toledo Garcia	Absent	Absent	Absent	Child
Ana Costa	Carlota Toledo Garcia	Absent	Absent	Absent	Child

=== Artistas Convidados ===
Actor/Actress	Character	Season				Episode
Actor/Actress	Character	1	2	3	4	Episode
Cristina Ferreira	Herself	check	✗	✗	✗	Episode 3
Ana Malhoa	Herself	check	✗	✗	✗	Episode 22
Marco Paulo	Himself	check	✗	✗	✗	Episode 27
Cláudio Ramos	Himself	✗	check	✗	✗	Episode 61
Toy	Himself	✗	check	✗	✗	Episode 73
Maria Botelho Moniz	Jogador	✗	check	✗	✗	Episode 78
João Baião	Himself	✗	✗	check	✗	Episode 114

== Series overview ==
Season	Episodes	Originally released	
Season	Episodes	First released	Last released
1	27	May 27, 2019	June 28, 2019
2	52	July 1, 2019	September 9, 2019
3	43	September 15, 2019	November 10, 2019
4	116	September 14, 2020	February 20, 2021
