= Golpe de Sorte season 4 =

Golpe de Sorte
- Season 4
- Starring: Maria João Abreu; Dânia Neto; Jorge Corrula; Pedro Barroso; Madalena Almeida; Diogo Martins
- No. of episodes: 116

Release
- Original network: SIC
- Original release: 14 September 2020 – 20 February 2021

Season chronology
- ← Previous; Season 3

The fourth season of Golpe de Sorte (Lucky Break) began airing on SIC on 14 September 2020. The season four of the series stars Maria João Abreu, Dânia Neto, Jorge Corrula, Pedro Barroso, Madalena Almeida and Diogo Martins.

== Cast ==
=== Main cast ===
| Actor/Actress | Characters |
|---|---|
| Maria João Abreu | Maria do Céu Garcia |
| Dânia Neto | Sílvia Mira |
| Dânia Neto | Andreia Mira |
| Jorge Corrula | Caio Amaral |
| Pedro Barroso | José Castro |
| Madalena Almeida | Lara de Jesus |
| Diogo Martins | Fábio Guerreiro |
| Isabela Valadeiro | Telma Garcia |
| Ângelo Rodrigues | Bruno Garcia |
| Manuela Maria | Preciosa Toledo |
| José Raposo | José Luís Toledo |
| Rui Mendes | Natário Garcia |
| Carmen Santos | Lúcia Garcia |
| Carolina Carvalho | Jéssica Toledo |
| Mariana Pacheco | Rubi Ferraz |

=== Recurrent cast ===
| Actor/Actress | Characters |
|---|---|
| Vítor Norte | Horácio Toledo |
| Rúben Gomes | Pedro Albuquerque |
| Henriqueta Maya | Cremilde Reis |
| Helena Laureano | Rosanne Toledo |
| Rosa do Canto | Amália Reis |
| Cecília Henriques | Graciete Pompeu |
| João Paulo Rodrigues | Justino «Tino» Sanganha |
| Martinho Silva | Nelson Farias |
| Raquel Tavares | Liliana Barroso |
| Luís Simões | — |
| Bernardo Lobo Faria | Paulo |
| Rui Dionisio | Rui Estrela |
| Inês Monteiro | Cíntia Novais |
| Carolina Frias | Marina Piedade |
| Maria Ana Filipe | Alexandra «Xana» Gaspar |
| Sílvia Chiola | Sandra Nolasco |

=== Guest cast ===
| Actor/Actress | Characters |
|---|---|
| Margarida Carpinteiro | Rosa Jordão |
| Luís Aleluia | Padre Alexandre Bento |

=== Additional cast ===
| Actor/Actress | Characters |
|---|---|
| Sara Norte | Branca Lucena |
| José Carlos Pereira | Vítor «Vitinho» |
| Diogo Carmona | Simão |
| Carlos Vieira | — |
| Elmano Sancho | — |
| Rui Luís Brás | — |
| Diana Costa e Silva | — |
| Maria Henrique | — |
| Luís Gaspar | — |
| Patrícia Bull | — |

== Episodes ==
| No. overall | No. in season | Title | Directed by | Written by | Original release date | Portugal viewers (millions) |
|---|---|---|---|---|---|---|
| 123 | 1 | "Episode 123" | Carlos Dante and António Gonçalo | Vera Sacramento | 14 September 2020 | N/A |
Zé Luís is angry with Maria do Céu on his birthday!
| 124 | 2 | "Episode 124" | Carlos Dante and António Gonçalo | Vera Sacramento | 15 September 2020 | N/A |
| 125 | 3 | "Episode 125" | Carlos Dante and António Gonçalo | Vera Sacramento | 16 September 2020 | N/A |
| 126 | 4 | "Episode 126" | Carlos Dante and António Gonçalo | Vera Sacramento | 17 September 2020 | N/A |
| 127 | 5 | "Episode 127" | Carlos Dante and António Gonçalo | Vera Sacramento | 18 September 2020 | N/A |
| 128 | 6 | "Episode 128" | Carlos Dante and António Gonçalo | Vera Sacramento | 19 September 2020 | N/A |
| 129 | 7 | "Episode 129" | Carlos Dante and António Gonçalo | Vera Sacramento | 21 September 2020 | N/A |
| 130 | 8 | "Episode 130" | Carlos Dante and António Gonçalo | Vera Sacramento | 22 September 2020 | N/A |
| 131 | 9 | "Episode 131" | Carlos Dante and António Gonçalo | Vera Sacramento | 23 September 2020 | N/A |
| 132 | 10 | "Episode 132" | Carlos Dante and António Gonçalo | Vera Sacramento | 24 September 2020 | N/A |
| 133 | 11 | "Episode 133" | Carlos Dante and António Gonçalo | Vera Sacramento | 25 September 2020 | N/A |
| 134 | 12 | "Episode 134" | Carlos Dante and António Gonçalo | Vera Sacramento | 26 September 2020 | N/A |
| 135 | 13 | "Episode 135" | Carlos Dante and António Gonçalo | Vera Sacramento | 28 September 2020 | N/A |
| 136 | 14 | "Episode 136" | Carlos Dante and António Gonçalo | Vera Sacramento | 29 September 2020 | N/A |
| 137 | 15 | "Episode 137" | Carlos Dante and António Gonçalo | Vera Sacramento | 30 September 2020 | N/A |
| 138 | 16 | "Episode 138" | Carlos Dante and António Gonçalo | Vera Sacramento | 1 October 2020 | N/A |
| 139 | 17 | "Episode 139" | Carlos Dante and António Gonçalo | Vera Sacramento | 2 October 2020 | N/A |
| 140 | 18 | "Episode 140" | Carlos Dante and António Gonçalo | Vera Sacramento | 3 October 2020 | N/A |
| 141 | 19 | "Episode 141" | Carlos Dante and António Gonçalo | Vera Sacramento | 5 October 2020 | N/A |
| 142 | 20 | "Episode 142" | Carlos Dante and António Gonçalo | Vera Sacramento | 6 October 2020 | N/A |
| 143 | 21 | "Episode 143" | Carlos Dante and António Gonçalo | Vera Sacramento | 7 October 2020 | N/A |
| 144 | 22 | "Episode 144" | Carlos Dante and António Gonçalo | Vera Sacramento | 8 October 2020 | N/A |
| 145 | 23 | "Episode 145" | Carlos Dante and António Gonçalo | Vera Sacramento | 9 October 2020 | N/A |
| 146 | 24 | "Episode 146" | Carlos Dante and António Gonçalo | Vera Sacramento | 12 October 2020 | N/A |
| 147 | 25 | "Episode 147" | Carlos Dante and António Gonçalo | Vera Sacramento | 13 October 2020 | N/A |
| 148 | 26 | "Episode 148" | Carlos Dante and António Gonçalo | Vera Sacramento | 14 October 2020 | N/A |
| 149 | 27 | "Episode 149" | Carlos Dante and António Gonçalo | Vera Sacramento | 15 October 2020 | N/A |
| 150 | 28 | "Episode 150" | Carlos Dante and António Gonçalo | Vera Sacramento | 16 October 2020 | N/A |
| 151 | 29 | "Episode 151" | Carlos Dante and António Gonçalo | Vera Sacramento | 17 October 2020 | N/A |
| 152 | 30 | "Episode 152" | Carlos Dante and António Gonçalo | Vera Sacramento | 19 October 2020 | N/A |
| 153 | 31 | "Episode 153" | Carlos Dante and António Gonçalo | Vera Sacramento | 20 October 2020 | N/A |
| 154 | 32 | "Episode 154" | Carlos Dante and António Gonçalo | Vera Sacramento | 21 October 2020 | N/A |
| 155 | 33 | "Episode 155" | Carlos Dante and António Gonçalo | Vera Sacramento | 22 October 2020 | N/A |
| 156 | 34 | "Episode 156" | Carlos Dante and António Gonçalo | Vera Sacramento | 23 October 2020 | N/A |
| 157 | 35 | "Episode 157" | Carlos Dante and António Gonçalo | Vera Sacramento | 24 October 2020 | N/A |
| 158 | 36 | "Episode 158" | Carlos Dante and António Gonçalo | Vera Sacramento | 26 October 2020 | N/A |
| 159 | 37 | "Episode 159" | Carlos Dante and António Gonçalo | Vera Sacramento | 27 October 2020 | N/A |
| 160 | 38 | "Episode 160" | Carlos Dante and António Gonçalo | Vera Sacramento | 28 October 2020 | N/A |
| 161 | 39 | "Episode 161" | Carlos Dante and António Gonçalo | Vera Sacramento | 29 October 2020 | N/A |
| 162 | 40 | "Episode 162" | Carlos Dante and António Gonçalo | Vera Sacramento | 30 October 2020 | N/A |
| 163 | 41 | "Episode 163" | Carlos Dante and António Gonçalo | Vera Sacramento | 31 October 2020 | N/A |
| 164 | 42 | "Episode 164" | Carlos Dante and António Gonçalo | Vera Sacramento | 2 November 2020 | N/A |
| 165 | 43 | "Episode 165" | Carlos Dante and António Gonçalo | Vera Sacramento | 3 November 2020 | N/A |
| 166 | 44 | "Episode 165" | Carlos Dante and António Gonçalo | Vera Sacramento | 4 November 2020 | N/A |
| 167 | 45 | "Episode 167" | Carlos Dante and António Gonçalo | Vera Sacramento | 5 November 2020 | N/A |
| 168 | 46 | "Episode 168" | Carlos Dante and António Gonçalo | Vera Sacramento | 6 November 2020 | N/A |
| 169 | 47 | "Episode 169" | Carlos Dante and António Gonçalo | Vera Sacramento | 9 November 2020 | N/A |
| 170 | 48 | "Episode 170" | Carlos Dante and António Gonçalo | Vera Sacramento | 10 November 2020 | N/A |
| 171 | 49 | "Episode 171" | Carlos Dante and António Gonçalo | Vera Sacramento | 11 November 2020 | N/A |
| 172 | 50 | "Episode 172" | Carlos Dante and António Gonçalo | Vera Sacramento | 12 November 2020 | N/A |
| 173 | 51 | "Episode 173" | Carlos Dante and António Gonçalo | Vera Sacramento | 13 November 2020 | N/A |
| 174 | 52 | "Episode 174" | Carlos Dante and António Gonçalo | Vera Sacramento | 16 November 2020 | N/A |
| 175 | 53 | "Episode 175" | Carlos Dante and António Gonçalo | Vera Sacramento | 17 November 2020 | N/A |
| 176 | 54 | "Episode 176" | Carlos Dante and António Gonçalo | Vera Sacramento | 18 November 2020 | N/A |
| 177 | 55 | "Episode 177" | Carlos Dante and António Gonçalo | Vera Sacramento | 19 November 2020 | N/A |
| 178 | 56 | "Episode 178" | Carlos Dante and António Gonçalo | Vera Sacramento | 20 November 2020 | N/A |
| 179 | 57 | "Episode 179" | Carlos Dante and António Gonçalo | Vera Sacramento | 23 November 2020 | N/A |
| 180 | 58 | "Episode 180" | Carlos Dante and António Gonçalo | Vera Sacramento | 24 November 2020 | N/A |
| 181 | 59 | "Episode 181" | Carlos Dante and António Gonçalo | Vera Sacramento | 25 November 2020 | N/A |
| 182 | 60 | "Episode 182" | Carlos Dante and António Gonçalo | Vera Sacramento | 26 November 2020 | N/A |
| 183 | 61 | "Episode 183" | Carlos Dante and António Gonçalo | Vera Sacramento | 27 November 2020 | N/A |
| 184 | 62 | "Episode 184" | Carlos Dante and António Gonçalo | Vera Sacramento | 30 November 2020 | N/A |
| 185 | 63 | "Episode 185" | Carlos Dante and António Gonçalo | Vera Sacramento | 1 December 2020 | N/A |
| 186 | 64 | "Episode 186" | Carlos Dante and António Gonçalo | Vera Sacramento | 2 December 2020 | N/A |
| 187 | 65 | "Episode 187" | Carlos Dante and António Gonçalo | Vera Sacramento | 3 December 2020 | N/A |
| 188 | 66 | "Episode 188" | Carlos Dante and António Gonçalo | Vera Sacramento | 4 December 2020 | N/A |
| 189 | 67 | "Episode 189" | Carlos Dante and António Gonçalo | Vera Sacramento | 7 December 2020 | N/A |
| 190 | 68 | "Episode 190" | Carlos Dante and António Gonçalo | Vera Sacramento | 8 December 2020 | N/A |
| 191 | 69 | "Episode 191" | Carlos Dante and António Gonçalo | Vera Sacramento | 9 December 2020 | N/A |
| 192 | 70 | "Episode 192" | Carlos Dante and António Gonçalo | Vera Sacramento | 10 December 2020 | N/A |
| 193 | 71 | "Episode 193" | Carlos Dante and António Gonçalo | Vera Sacramento | 11 December 2020 | N/A |
| 194 | 72 | "Episode 194" | Carlos Dante and António Gonçalo | Vera Sacramento | 14 December 2020 | N/A |
| 195 | 73 | "Episode 195" | Carlos Dante and António Gonçalo | Vera Sacramento | 15 December 2020 | N/A |
| 196 | 74 | "Episode 196" | Carlos Dante and António Gonçalo | Vera Sacramento | 16 December 2020 | N/A |
| 197 | 75 | "Episode 197" | Carlos Dante and António Gonçalo | Vera Sacramento | 17 December 2020 | N/A |
| 198 | 76 | "Episode 198" | Carlos Dante and António Gonçalo | Vera Sacramento | 18 December 2020 | N/A |
| 199 | 77 | "Episode 199" | Carlos Dante and António Gonçalo | Vera Sacramento | 21 December 2020 | N/A |
| 200 | 78 | "Episode 200" | Carlos Dante and António Gonçalo | Vera Sacramento | 22 December 2020 | N/A |
| 201 | 79 | "Episode 201" | Carlos Dante and António Gonçalo | Vera Sacramento | 28 December 2020 | N/A |
| 202 | 80 | "Episode 202" | Carlos Dante and António Gonçalo | Vera Sacramento | 29 December 2020 | N/A |
| 203 | 81 | "Episode 203" | Carlos Dante and António Gonçalo | Vera Sacramento | 30 December 2020 | N/A |
| 204 | 82 | "Episode 204" | Carlos Dante and António Gonçalo | Vera Sacramento | 4 January 2021 | N/A |
| 205 | 83 | "Episode 205" | Carlos Dante and António Gonçalo | Vera Sacramento | 5 January 2021 | N/A |
| 206 | 84 | "Episode 206" | Carlos Dante and António Gonçalo | Vera Sacramento | 6 January 2021 | N/A |
| 207 | 85 | "Episode 207" | Carlos Dante and António Gonçalo | Vera Sacramento | 7 January 2021 | N/A |
| 208 | 86 | "Episode 208" | Carlos Dante and António Gonçalo | Vera Sacramento | 8 January 2021 | N/A |
| 209 | 87 | "Episode 209" | Carlos Dante and António Gonçalo | Vera Sacramento | 11 January 2021 | N/A |
| 210 | 88 | "Episode 210" | Carlos Dante and António Gonçalo | Vera Sacramento | 12 January 2021 | N/A |
| 211 | 89 | "Episode 211" | Carlos Dante and António Gonçalo | Vera Sacramento | 13 January 2021 | N/A |
| 212 | 90 | "Episode 212" | Carlos Dante and António Gonçalo | Vera Sacramento | 14 January 2021 | N/A |
| 213 | 91 | "Episode 213" | Carlos Dante and António Gonçalo | Vera Sacramento | 15 January 2021 | N/A |
| 214 | 92 | "Episode 214" | Carlos Dante and António Gonçalo | Vera Sacramento | 18 January 2021 | N/A |
| 215 | 93 | "Episode 215" | Carlos Dante and António Gonçalo | Vera Sacramento | 19 January 2021 | N/A |
| 216 | 94 | "Episode 216" | Carlos Dante and António Gonçalo | Vera Sacramento | 20 January 2021 | N/A |
| 217 | 95 | "Episode 217" | Carlos Dante and António Gonçalo | Vera Sacramento | 21 January 2021 | N/A |
| 218 | 96 | "Episode 218" | Carlos Dante and António Gonçalo | Vera Sacramento | 22 January 2021 | N/A |
| 219 | 97 | "Episode 219" | Carlos Dante and António Gonçalo | Vera Sacramento | 25 January 2021 | N/A |
| 220 | 98 | "Episode 220" | Carlos Dante and António Gonçalo | Vera Sacramento | 26 January 2021 | N/A |
| 221 | 99 | "Episode 221" | Carlos Dante and António Gonçalo | Vera Sacramento | 27 January 2021 | N/A |
| 222 | 100 | "Episode 222" | Carlos Dante and António Gonçalo | Vera Sacramento | 28 January 2021 | N/A |
| 223 | 101 | "Episode 223" | Carlos Dante and António Gonçalo | Vera Sacramento | 29 January 2021 | N/A |
| 224 | 102 | "Episode 224" | Carlos Dante and António Gonçalo | Vera Sacramento | 1 February 2021 | N/A |
| 225 | 103 | "Episode 225" | Carlos Dante and António Gonçalo | Vera Sacramento | 2 February 2021 | N/A |
| 226 | 104 | "Episode 226" | Carlos Dante and António Gonçalo | Vera Sacramento | 3 February 2021 | N/A |
| 227 | 105 | "Episode 227" | Carlos Dante and António Gonçalo | Vera Sacramento | 4 February 2021 | N/A |
| 228 | 106 | "Episode 228" | Carlos Dante and António Gonçalo | Vera Sacramento | 5 February 2021 | N/A |
| 229 | 107 | "Episode 229" | Carlos Dante and António Gonçalo | Vera Sacramento | 8 February 2021 | N/A |
| 230 | 108 | "Episode 230" | Carlos Dante and António Gonçalo | Vera Sacramento | 9 February 2021 | N/A |
| 231 | 109 | "Episode 231" | Carlos Dante and António Gonçalo | Vera Sacramento | 10 February 2021 | N/A |
| 232 | 110 | "Episode 232" | Carlos Dante and António Gonçalo | Vera Sacramento | 11 February 2021 | N/A |
| 233 | 111 | "Episode 233" | Carlos Dante and António Gonçalo | Vera Sacramento | 12 February 2021 | N/A |
| 234 | 112 | "Episode 234" | Carlos Dante and António Gonçalo | Vera Sacramento | 15 February 2021 | N/A |
| 235 | 113 | "Episode 235" | Carlos Dante and António Gonçalo | Vera Sacramento | 16 February 2021 | N/A |
| 236 | 114 | "Episode 236" | Carlos Dante and António Gonçalo | Vera Sacramento | 17 February 2021 | N/A |
| 237 | 115 | "Episode 237" | Carlos Dante and António Gonçalo | Vera Sacramento | 19 February 2021 | N/A |
| 238 | 116 | "Episode 238" | Carlos Dante and António Gonçalo | Vera Sacramento | 20 February 2021 | N/A |
