= Amor Maior =

- Also known as: Maior que a Vida (season 1); Greater Than Life (season 1); Até Que a Morte nos Separe (season 2); Till Death Do Us Part (season 2)
- Created by: Inês Gomes
- Starring: Sara Matos; José Fidalgo; Inês Castel-Branco; José Mata (see more)
- Country of origin: Portugal
- Original language: Portuguese
- No. of seasons: 2
- No. of episodes: 333

Original release
- Network: SIC
- Release: 12 September 2016 – 30 September 2017

Amor Maior (More Than Love) is a Portuguese telenovela which began airing on SIC on 12 September 2016 and ending on 30 September 2017.

== Plot ==
Series	Episodes		Originally released	
Series	Episodes		First released	Last released
1	170		12 September 2016	28 March 2017
2	163	91	29 March 2017	10 July 2017
2	163	72	11 July 2017	30 September 2017

=== Season One ===
Out of love for her brothers, Clara will have to face Francisca and her stepmother. Francisca always wanted the life and fortune that her half-sister, Laura, had. She ordered her killed, married her husband, and adopted the younger stepdaughters.

Now plans to kill her husband, but Clara, Laura's eldest daughter, finds out and tries to tell her family. No one believes in Clara and her father ends up driving her and his son, Afonso, out of the house. At the same time, they struggle to work with Paulo (known as "Lobo" which translates to "Wolf"), a criminal who is making them work for him as Afonso's girlfriend lost drugs that she was selling for "Lobo". Afonso broke up with her right after, however "Lobo" never made his girlfriend work for him only Afonso and his sister Clara. However "Lobo" begins to see Clara with other eyes, falling in love with her. Clara faces a problem as she can not get custody of her sisters, Daniela and Marta, but she promised to make everything to protect them. Francisca does not facilitate the life of Clara because she falls in love with her beloved, Manel, finishing these by having an affair. But when Manel realizes that Francisca is not who he thinks, it ends soon with their relationship and goes to Clara. Clara and Manel live a beautiful love story.

Francisca, however, has not stopped loving Manel since the first day she had with him. So this will make Clara's life a living hell and do everything to separate them. Manel even knowing that Francisca is Clara's stepmother, continues with this ending even by marrying her. However, when Francisca was having an affair with Manel, she was married to Eduardo (biological father of Clara, Marta, Daniela and Afonso), and since she wanted to go with Manel and receive his inheritance, she decided to kill him at the party. Marta's birthday.

This is normal, this one stayed in the tracks because the father died at his own party. Daniela, was the only person who had ever arrived at the compound (a terrace in Alfama). As soon as she got there, Francisca was talking to her father. Francisca decided that it was a good time for her husband to die.

He threw him on the terrace and he died. Daniela, who was in the room, was shocked by what had happened. Francisca, only later did she realize that her husband had died in the presence of Daniela. From this moment, Francisca, afraid that Daniela "opened her mouth" began to give her pills to silence her and to say nothing to the authorities. Daniela is being manipulated by Francisca, and when someone asks her who killed Eduardo, she accuses Clara to Francisca.

Clara and Manel are married but Francisca does not give up on separating them, the villain discovers that his nephew Ricardo has a video of the robbery to the museum where Carlos Paiva died. The villain threatens to tell everyone that Ricardo is homosexual if she does not receive the video. Ricardo gives in to his aunt's blackmail and hands her the video. Francisca made a trip to São Tomé, where Clara and Manel were spending their honeymoon, and threatened the stepdaughter to tell Manel that he participated in the robbery of the museum and to show him the images and the police. Clara gives in and tells Manel that she was forced by the Wolf to make the assault. Manel is disillusioned with Clara and does not forgive her. Which leaves Francisca satisfied.

The villain continues to drug Daniela and turns her against the brothers. Clara asks for help to Nina, the woman who helped Daniela when she was missing, to help her gain the confidence of the girl again and Nina accepts. Daniela is very happy to see Nina and Zuzu and is happier when Nina lets her stay with the dog. When Marta tells Francisca about the judge, Francisca full of rage kills Zuzu, which leaves Daniela behind. The villain threatens Marta to do the same to a person if she goes on to say that she is a lousy mother. Francisca loses custody of Marta but stays with Daniela, who speaks well of her (because she does not want the stepmother to hurt her brothers). Francisca threatens Clara, Afonso and Marta that they will not see Daniela again.

Telmo, still feeling betrayed by Francisca to have a son who is also from Manel, goes to the palace and finds Clara to tell him the whole truth about Francisca. Telmo tells Clara that Francisca was pushing Eduardo off the terrace at Marta's party, and when Daniela was missing, Francisca planned to kidnap her. Telmo also reveals that it was Francisca who had Laura killed. Clara asks Telmo to testify against Francisca for her to pay for everything she did, but Telmo refuses because if Francisca is arrested, he goes with her. Telmo asks Clara to arrange evidence, she will have to prove that Francisca had an affair with Eduardo before Laura left for São Tomé and died. The death of Laura commissioned by Francisca leaves Afonso motivated to catch Francisca and kill her.

Manel and Clara go alone to the farm of Clara's family. On the way they agree that they will have to have a serious conversation after being able to incriminate Francisca. When they get there, Clara sees Lobo's car and is furious, thinking that this one ended with Francisca, against her will. Manel, for his part, is worried about his baby.

Without anyone knowing, Afonso is there with Lobo and they both wear the same monkey suits and put on masks. Surprised Francisca who is scared. Wolf threatens her but Afonso asks him to shoot. Clara and Manel appear and this one orders the hooded ones to drop the arms. Manel shoots Afonso.

=== Season Two ===
When Manel removes Afonso's mask, Clara is in shock and Manel is taken aback. Wolf flees from there while Manel asks Francisca for help. She examines the stepson and informs Manel and Clara that they have to take him to the hospital immediately, or he will not survive. Manel picks it up and takes it to the car.

Francisca informs Pilar of what happened. She is worried that her nephew was shot.

Manel and Clara arrive with Afonso to the hospital and this one is taken, immediately, to the operative block. Manel tries to apologize but Clara only thinks about her brother.

Pilar arrives at the hospital and hugs Clara. They still do not know anything about Afonso. Pilar feels responsible for the fact that the nephew has reached that point of revolt. Manel approaches and feels guilty but still wants to combine the testimony with Clara to avoid that Afonso is accused of attempted murder.

Afonso almost died in the operation, Afonso is in an induced coma.

Francisca returns to Lisbon and tells Teresa that there was an accident on the farm and that Afonso was shot. Teresa and Daniela get very agitated. Daniela loses her temper and explodes, accusing Francisca of having failed what she promised, of not doing any of her brothers any harm. Teresa is strange in her behavior and defends the granddaughter of her daughter's manipulations.

Manel ventured with Pilar who shot Afonso thinking that it was Wolf, admitting his desire for revenge. Pilar fears Afonso will be arrested after recovering. Jorge appears and does not bring good news, the state of Afonso is critical because he lost a lot of blood.

Manel gives his testimony to a PSP agent. It does not reveal that Clara was present nor that Afonso was armed. He claims that he thought it was Telmo and that he fired to defend a defenseless civilian. After the agent left, Manel ventured with Pilar who hated to have to lie but did it for Afonso.

Marta arrives at the hospital with Vicente and tries to understand what really happened. Clara does not reveal the truth. The surgeon who operated Afonso addresses the family and conveys, in dismay, that Afonso is alive but in an induced coma so he will not feel pain. Clara and Marta enter the room where Afonso is connected to the machines and cry when they see their brother in that situation. Clara finally tells Marta that it was Manel who struck her brother.

Wolf goes to the hospital to know what the state of Afonso and Clara reacts very badly to his presence there. However, he burst into tears in the bandit's arms, with no strength to resist.

Pilar receives Gonçalo in his house and talks with his friend about Afonso's health. Vicente also appears and is displeased to see Gonçalo again, in the house of his ex-wife. This one comes to ask explanations to Pilar about having hidden to him that Francisca is behind the death of Laura and presses it to pass him a power of attorney with the actions of Marta.

When visiting Afonso in the hospital, Lobo crosses with Manel who accuses him of being responsible for that situation. After all, Lobo assumes nothing.

Clara rushes into Francisca's house and tells her to keep quiet about Afonso. Despite her threats, Clara guarantees that she will do justice with her own hands should anything happen to Afonso.

At Francisca's house, she thanks Manel for saving her life. Manel, for his part, demands that she does nothing against Afonso under threat of reopening the investigation for Laura's death.

When Francisca arrives at the PJ to testify, Luisa sends Manel out of her room. Apprehensive, Manel observes Francisca and Luisa at a distance. Francisca keeps the story that Manel told and refuses to present a complaint against her nephew. Luisa is strange to say that it was all the result of a joke of bad taste and Manel is relieved to know that it collaborated to his lie.

Clara is furious to learn that Manel negotiated with Francisca not to reopen the investigation into Laura's death. She feels betrayed by Manel and frustrated that she can not avenge her mother's death.

Helena confronts Gonçalo and asks him some more time to be able to tell the truth to Manel about his fatherhood and he says he will not wait very long.

Pilar tells the truth about Francisca to Teresa, who was the Francisca who had Laura killed to get everything that was of the half-sister, who was the Francisca who pushed Eduardo, Eduardo and Francisca to be lovers before Laura died and Francisca Have killed Daniela's female dog Zuzu. This leaves Teresa in shock and she turns to her daughter for all the evil she did to the family and regrets what she did because if she had realized who Francisca really was, Laura would still be alive but Clara promises that Francisca will pay for Which they did.

== Cast ==
Actor/Actress	Character	Season	
Actor/Actress	Character	1	2
Sara Matos	Clara Resende Borges	Protagonist	Protagonist
José Fidalgo	Manuel Paiva	Protagonist	Protagonist
Inês Castel-Branco	Francisca Alves Borges	Antagonist	Antagonist
José Mata	Paulo Costa (Lobo)	Antagonist	Protagonist
João Reis	Gonçalo Nascimento	Guest	Co-Antagonist
Ana Padrão	Laura Resende	Guest	Co-Protagonist
Maria João Luís	Pilar Tavares	Regular	Regular
Rogério Samora	Vicente Resende	Regular	Regular
Vitória Guerra	Diana Almeida	Regular	Regular
Maria João Abreu	Dolores Matias	Regular	Regular
José Raposo	Armando Matias	Regular	Regular
Sofia Sá da Bandeira	Helena Machado Paiva	Regular	Regular
Margarida Carpinteiro	Amália Machado	Regular	Regular
Júlio César	Joel Correia	Regular	
Lia Gama	Teresa Alves Resende	Regular	Regular
Miguel Damião	Jorge Almeida	Regular	Regular
Rita Loureiro	Edite Paiva Neto	Regular	Regular
Ruben Gomes	Sebastião Araújo	Regular	Regular
Dânia Neto	Liliana Faria	Regular	Regular
Rui Unas	António Manuel Cerejo (Tomané)	Regular	Regular
Oceana Basílio	Miranda Sousa	Regular	Regular
Jorge Corrula	Raul Sousa	Guest	Regular
Tiago Teotónio Pereira	Ricardo Tavares Resende	Regular	Regular
Tiago Aldeia	Henrique Franco	Regular	Regular
Cleia Almeida	Bárbara Tavares Resende	Regular	Regular
João Jesus	Gabriel Neto	Regular	Regular
Filipa Areosa	Mafalda Tavares Resende	Regular	Regular
Ana Guiomar	Maria Preciosa Dias	Regular	Regular
João Baptista	Telmo Santos	Regular	Regular
Mariana Norton	Alice Oliveira	Regular	Regular
Diogo Valsassina	Nelson Matias	Regular	Regular
Catarina Rebelo	Marta Resende Borges	Regular	Regular
João Maneira	Afonso Resende Borges	Regular	Regular
Cecília Henriques	Gisela Torres	Regular	Regular
Hélder Agapito	Joaquim Paiva	Regular	Regular
Matamba Joaquim	Timóteo Neto	Regular	Regular
Hugo Tavares	Nuno Correia	Recurring	
Marco Mendonça	Lucas Preguiça	Regular	Regular
Miguel Costa	Alberto Cruz	Regular	Regular
Miguel Frazão	Rogério Mendes (Roger)	Regular	Regular
Samuel Alves	Miguel Almeida	Regular	Regular
Beatriz Frazão	Daniela Resende Borges	Regular	Regular
Alexandre Jorge	Alexandre Paiva	Regular	Regular
Madalena Almeida	Cátia Sousa	Regular	Regular
Miguel Monteiro	Carlos Manuel Fontes Paiva	Guest	
