= Água de Mar =

- Starring: Jorge Corrula; Mariana Monteiro; Rui Santos
- Country of origin: Portugal
- Original language: Portuguese

Production
- Running time: 40 minutes

Original release
- Network: RTP1
- Release: 14 July 2014 – May 20, 2015

Água de Mar is a Portuguese television series that premiered on 14 July 2014 on RTP1. It stars Jorge Corrula, Mariana Monteiro and Rui Santos.

== Cast ==
- Jorge Corrula
- Mariana Monteiro
- Rui Santos
