= List of Golpe de Sorte episodes =

The following is a list of episodes of the SIC television series, Golpe de Sorte, created by Vera Sacramento. The series debuted on May 27, 2019. The series follows the life of Céu, a woman who sells fruit in a market and is surrounded by a maelstrom when she wins Euromilhões.

== Series overview ==
Season	Episodes	Originally released	
Season	Episodes	First released	Last released
1	27	May 27, 2019	June 28, 2019
2	52	July 1, 2019	September 9, 2019
3	43	September 15, 2019	November 10, 2019
4	116	September 14, 2020	February 20, 2021

== Episodes ==
=== Season 1 (2019) ===
No. overall	No. in season	Title	Directed by	Written by	Original release date	Portugal viewers (millions)
1	1	"Episode 1"	Carlos Dante and António Gonçalo	Vera Sacramento	27 May 2019	1.36
Maria do Céu remembers the moment when she abandoned her own son. Bruno believes that the mother won the Euromillions.
2	2	"Episode 2"	Carlos Dante and António Gonçalo	Vera Sacramento	28 May 2019	1.30
Maria do Céu discovers that she is Euromillionaire!
3	3	"Episode 3"	Carlos Dante and António Gonçalo	Vera Sacramento	29 May 2019	1.16
Alvorinha stops to see Maria do Céu in Programa da Cristina. Guest star: Cristina Ferreira as herself
4	4	"Episode 4"	Carlos Dante and António Gonçalo	Vera Sacramento	30 May 2019	1.03
Sílvia arrives at Alvorinha and is determined to stay!
5	5	"Episode 5"	Carlos Dante and António Gonçalo	Vera Sacramento	31 May 2019	1.05
Sílvia presents herself as Miriam to the Garcia to revolutionize the palace of Maria do Céu.
6	6	"Episode 6"	Carlos Dante and António Gonçalo	Vera Sacramento	3 June 2019	1.16
Maria do Céu changes her look and is unrecognizable!
7	7	"Episode 7"	Carlos Dante and António Gonçalo	Vera Sacramento	4 June 2019	1.10
Maria do Céu makes an ultimatum to Preciosa!
8	8	"Episode 8"	Carlos Dante and António Gonçalo	Vera Sacramento	5 June 2019	1.09
Preciosa tries to get in touch with those responsible for the disappearance of the son of Céu!
9	9	"Episode 9"	Carlos Dante and António Gonçalo	Vera Sacramento	6 June 2019	1.19
Preciosa marks a meeting between Maria do Céu and the couple who stayed with her son.
10	10	"Episode 10"	Carlos Dante and António Gonçalo	Vera Sacramento	7 June 2019	1.08
Céu prepares to meet the couple who stole his son!
11	11	"Episode 11"	Carlos Dante and António Gonçalo	Vera Sacramento	10 June 2019	1.19
Priest Aníbal saves Teresa from committing madness.
12	12	"Episode 12"	Carlos Dante and António Gonçalo	Vera Sacramento	11 June 2019	1.09
Telma is abducted during the Benefit Gala.
13	13	"Episode 13"	Carlos Dante and António Gonçalo	Vera Sacramento	12 June 2019	0.87
Caio pretends to have saved Telma and is considered the true hero of the story.
14	14	"Episode 14"	Carlos Dante and António Gonçalo	Vera Sacramento	13 June 2019	1.03
Graciete tells Maria do Céu that her personal coach Miriam has another name.
15	15	"Episode 15"	Carlos Dante and António Gonçalo	Vera Sacramento	14 June 2019	0.97
José Luís makes a revelation to Maria do Céu that leaves her in shock!
16	16	"Episode 16 and 17a"	Carlos Dante and António Gonçalo	Vera Sacramento	17 June 2019	1.09
17a	17a	"Episode 16 and 17a"	Carlos Dante and António Gonçalo	Vera Sacramento	17 June 2019	1.09
Miriam suggests to Céu that she give him a power of attorney to deal with the boring bureaucracies.
17b	17b	"Episode 17b and 18"	Carlos Dante and António Gonçalo	Vera Sacramento	18 June 2019	1.19
18	18	"Episode 17b and 18"	Carlos Dante and António Gonçalo	Vera Sacramento	18 June 2019	1.19
The plan of Preciosa advances and Maria do Céu believes that she is within hours of meeting her son Rafael.
19	19	"Episode 19"	Carlos Dante and António Gonçalo	Vera Sacramento	19 June 2019	1.10
Cremilde catches Amália and Horácio in flagrante.
20	20	"Episode 20"	Carlos Dante and António Gonçalo	Vera Sacramento	20 June 2019	1.04
Caio catches Preciosa in flagrante to bribe Hélder and Rosa.
21	21	"Episode 21"	Carlos Dante and António Gonçalo	Vera Sacramento	21 June 2019	1.05
Preciosa is left alone and without the support of Cremilde and Lucia!
22	22	"Episode 22"	Carlos Dante and António Gonçalo	Vera Sacramento	22 June 2019	0.94
Xavier implies with Kelly the friend of Cíntia that applied for assistant of kitchen in the restaurant. Guest star: Ana Malhoa as herself
23	23	"Episode 23"	Carlos Dante and António Gonçalo	Vera Sacramento	24 June 2019	1.13
Bruno decides to suspend his marriage to Jéssica!
24	24	"Episode 24"	Carlos Dante and António Gonçalo	Vera Sacramento	25 June 2019	1.17
Graciete takes a picture of Miriam's passport and sends it to Ricardo!
25	25	"Episode 25"	Carlos Dante and António Gonçalo	Vera Sacramento	26 June 2019	1.23
Jéssica starts to lose blood and Bruno takes her to the hospital!
26	26	"Episode 26"	Carlos Dante and António Gonçalo	Vera Sacramento	27 June 2019	1.12
Bruno and Jéssica, unwittingly, end up bachelor partying together.
27	27	"Episode 27"	Carlos Dante and António Gonçalo	Vera Sacramento	28 June 2019	1.10
Bruno discovers that Jessica betrayed him to Tino. Caio shoots Ricardo but the shot hits Maria do Céu who is unconscious on the ground. Leonor changes her look and arrives to take revenge on Caio and Sílvia, titled Alice, the new doctor at the health center. Guest star: Marco Paulo as himself

=== Season 2 (2019) ===
No. overall	No. in season	Title	Directed by	Written by	Original release date	Portugal viewers (millions)
28	1	"Episode 28"	Carlos Dante and António Gonçalo	Vera Sacramento	1 July 2019	1.21
Alice saves the life of Maria do Céu who returns to the palace without being able to speak!
29	2	"Episode 29"	Carlos Dante and António Gonçalo	Vera Sacramento	2 July 2019	1.22
Preciosa already knows the truth about Sílvia but promises to help her if she receives something in return!
30	3	"Episode 30"	Carlos Dante and António Gonçalo	Vera Sacramento	3 July 2019	1.17
Ricardo decides to tell the whole truth about Caio and Sílvia when he receives a threat and gives up the idea!
31	4	"Episode 31"	Carlos Dante and António Gonçalo	Vera Sacramento	4 July 2019	1.20
Maria do Céu decides to give up the fortune which leaves the family in shock!
32	5	"Episode 32"	Carlos Dante and António Gonçalo	Vera Sacramento	5 July 2019	0.99
Duarte, at the command of Caio and Sílvia, pretends to be the missing son of Maria do Céu!
33	6	"Episode 33"	Carlos Dante and António Gonçalo	Vera Sacramento	8 July 2019	1.22
Maria do Céu is radiant with the arrival of Vasco, but for reasons of confidence she wants to confirm that he is her son!
34	7	"Episode 34"	Carlos Dante and António Gonçalo	Vera Sacramento	9 July 2019	N/A
Vasco gets nervous with the DNA test but Sílvia/Miriam promises to handle everything!
35	8	"Episode 35"	Carlos Dante and António Gonçalo	Vera Sacramento	10 July 2019	1.04
Horácio begins to deal in the art of politics.
36	9	"Episode 36"	Carlos Dante and António Gonçalo	Vera Sacramento	11 July 2019	N/A
Vasco pretends he has nowhere to go to be in Maria do Céu's palace. Will Vasco be in Maria do Céu's palace?
37	10	"Episode 37"	Carlos Dante and António Gonçalo	Vera Sacramento	12 July 2019	1.04
Maria do Céu brings the whole family together to unravel the results of Vasco's DNA test.
38	11	"Episode 38"	Carlos Dante and António Gonçalo	Vera Sacramento	15 July 2019	1.14
Teresa and Cláudio kiss each other.
39	12	"Episode 39"	Carlos Dante and António Gonçalo	Vera Sacramento	16 July 2019	1.16
Caio spends the night with Alice.
40	13	"Episode 40"	Carlos Dante and António Gonçalo	Vera Sacramento	17 July 2019	1.20
Tino talks about Jéssica and Bruno loses his mind!
41	14	"Episode 41"	Carlos Dante and António Gonçalo	Vera Sacramento	18 July 2019	1.10
Sílvia catches Caio in bed with Alice.
42	15	"Episode 42"	Carlos Dante and António Gonçalo	Vera Sacramento	19 July 2019	1.05
Bruno and Miriam kiss each other!
43	16	"Episode 43"	Carlos Dante and António Gonçalo	Vera Sacramento	22 July 2019	N/A
Carlos assaults Cláudio ahead of Teresa!
44	17	"Episode 44"	Carlos Dante and António Gonçalo	Vera Sacramento	23 July 2019	N/A
Sílvia threatens Caio with a weapon!
45	18	"Episode 45"	Carlos Dante and António Gonçalo	Vera Sacramento	24 July 2019	N/A
Leonor implements the plan to catch the villains: Caio and Sílvia!
46	19	"Episode 46"	Carlos Dante and António Gonçalo	Vera Sacramento	25 July 2019	N/A
Ricardo and Alice/Leonor agree to unite to unmask Caio and Sílvia!
47	20	"Episode 47"	Carlos Dante and António Gonçalo	Vera Sacramento	26 July 2019	N/A
Miriam and Bruno get involved!
48	21	"Episode 48"	Carlos Dante and António Gonçalo	Vera Sacramento	29 July 2019	N/A
Caio threatens Ricardo with a knife!
49	22	"Episode 49"	Carlos Dante and António Gonçalo	Vera Sacramento	30 July 2019	N/A
Bruno assaults Vasco.
50	23	"Episode 50"	Carlos Dante and António Gonçalo	Vera Sacramento	31 July 2019	N/A
Tired of the environment in the village, Bruno leaves home!
51	24	"Episode 51"	Carlos Dante and António Gonçalo	Vera Sacramento	1 August 2019	N/A
Amália confronts Horácio.
52	25	"Episode 52"	Carlos Dante and António Gonçalo	Vera Sacramento	2 August 2019	N/A
Sílvia discovers that Leonor is deceiving Caio.
53	26	"Episode 53"	Carlos Dante and António Gonçalo	Vera Sacramento	5 August 2019	N/A
Natário tries to make Bruno make up with Vasco.
54	27	"Episode 54"	Carlos Dante and António Gonçalo	Vera Sacramento	6 August 2019	N/A
Leonor gets the information he wanted so much: Vasco is not a child of Céu!
55	28	"Episode 55"	Carlos Dante and António Gonçalo	Vera Sacramento	7 August 2019	N/A
Jéssica hides from Bruno and puts the whole dawn looking for you!
56	29	"Episode 56"	Carlos Dante and António Gonçalo	Vera Sacramento	8 August 2019	N/A
Jéssica, Bruno and Tino do DNA testing!
57	30	"Episode 57"	Carlos Dante and António Gonçalo	Vera Sacramento	9 August 2019	N/A
Jorge sees Serafim mistreating Beatriz and beats him!
58	31	"Episode 58"	Carlos Dante and António Gonçalo	Vera Sacramento	12 August 2019	N/A
Ricardo discovers that Caio, Sílvia and Vasco already knew each other!
59	32	"Episode 59"	Carlos Dante and António Gonçalo	Vera Sacramento	13 August 2019	N/A
Leonor/Alice has a plan to catch fake Detective Vasques.
60	33	"Episode 60"	Carlos Dante and António Gonçalo	Vera Sacramento	14 August 2019	N/A
Horácio or Alfredo run for election in an iron fist!
61	34	"Episode 61"	Carlos Dante and António Gonçalo	Vera Sacramento	15 August 2019	N/A
Cláudio Ramos appears in Alvorinha to pay a visit to Maria do Céu! Guest star: Cláudio Ramos as himself
62	35	"Episode 62"	Carlos Dante and António Gonçalo	Vera Sacramento	16 August 2019	N/A
Frightened by the threats of Dr. Carlos, Patrícia vent with Claudio who decides to take action!
63	36	"Episode 63"	Carlos Dante and António Gonçalo	Vera Sacramento	19 August 2019	N/A
Does Vasques tell the truth about Caio and Silvia?
64	37	"Episode 64"	Carlos Dante and António Gonçalo	Vera Sacramento	20 August 2019	N/A
Miriam catches Bruno and Jessica kissing and ends everything with the son of the Euromillionaire!
65	38	"Episode 65"	Carlos Dante and António Gonçalo	Vera Sacramento	21 August 2019	N/A
Jessica's baby DNA test result arrives at the boarding house and will end up in Miriam/Sílvia's hands!
66	39	"Episode 66"	Carlos Dante and António Gonçalo	Vera Sacramento	22 August 2019	N/A
Teresa has surgery scheduled in Paris and is filled with hope, will she ever see again?
67	40	"Episode 67"	Carlos Dante and António Gonçalo	Vera Sacramento	23 August 2019	N/A
Maria do Céu convinces Bruno to return home!
68	41	"Episode 68"	Carlos Dante and António Gonçalo	Vera Sacramento	26 August 2019	N/A
Caio and Sílvia manage to get Ricardo out of their investigation!
69	42	"Episode 69"	Carlos Dante and António Gonçalo	Vera Sacramento	27 August 2019	N/A
Bruno suspects that Vasco is not his brother and has a plan to find out the truth!
70	43	"Episode 70"	Carlos Dante and António Gonçalo	Vera Sacramento	28 August 2019	N/A
Ricardo tells Alice/Leonor that Bruno will find out the truth about Vasco and the doctor is pleased.
71	44	"Episode 71"	Carlos Dante and António Gonçalo	Vera Sacramento	29 August 2019	N/A
Sílvia has a plan to get rid of Vasco and Detective Vasques!
72	45	"Episode 72"	Carlos Dante and António Gonçalo	Vera Sacramento	30 August 2019	N/A
Bruno reveals to his family that Vasco is an impostor!
73	46	"Episode 73"	Carlos Dante and António Gonçalo	Vera Sacramento	1 September 2019	N/A
Patrícia tells Teresa that she went blind because of Dr. Carlos! Guest star: Toy as himself
74	47	"Episode 74"	Carlos Dante and António Gonçalo	Vera Sacramento	2 September 2019	N/A
Maria do Céu reveals to the family that she and José Luís are together!
75	48	"Episode 75"	Carlos Dante and António Gonçalo	Vera Sacramento	3 September 2019	N/A
Céu decides she will keep part of her fortune at home and leaves Sílvia/Miriam out of her mind!
76	49	"Episode 76"	Carlos Dante and António Gonçalo	Vera Sacramento	4 September 2019	N/A
Caio and Sílvia manage to transfer the 60 million of Maria do Céu to they account!
77	50	"Episode 77"	Carlos Dante and António Gonçalo	Vera Sacramento	5 September 2019	N/A
José Luis asks Maria do Céu to marry him!
78	51	"Episode 78"	Carlos Dante and António Gonçalo	Vera Sacramento	6 September 2019	N/A
Telma is attacked by a woman who follows her reality show. Guest star: Maria Botelho Moniz as Jogador
79	52	"Episode 79"	Carlos Dante and António Gonçalo	Vera Sacramento	8 September 2019 (Part 1) 9 September 2019 (Part 2)	TBD (Part 1) 1.51 (Part 2)
Cíntia suffers an unexpected surprise! (Part 1) Madre Rosário reveals that Caio is the son of Maria do Céu! (Part 2)

=== Season 3 (2019) ===
No. overall	No. in season	Title	Directed by	Written by	Original release date	Portugal viewers (millions)
80	1	"Episode 80"	Carlos Dante and António Gonçalo	Vera Sacramento	15 September 2019	1.30
Céu tells the family that Jorge is his son!
81	2	"Episode 81"	Carlos Dante and António Gonçalo	Vera Sacramento	16 September 2019	1.22
Maria do Céu and Madre Rosário confront each other!
82	3	"Episode 82"	Carlos Dante and António Gonçalo	Vera Sacramento	17 September 2019	1.25
Ricardo is found dead!
83	4	"Episode 83"	Carlos Dante and António Gonçalo	Vera Sacramento	18 September 2019	N/A
Caio is the prime suspect in Ricardo's death!
84	5	"Episode 84"	Carlos Dante and António Gonçalo	Vera Sacramento	19 September 2019	N/A
Caio and Leonor are interrogated by police.
85	6	"Episode 85"	Carlos Dante and António Gonçalo	Vera Sacramento	20 September 2019	N/A
Céu and José Luís announce the results of Caio's DNA test to the family.
86	7	"Episode 86"	Carlos Dante and António Gonçalo	Vera Sacramento	22 September 2019	N/A
Sílvia disguises herself as a nun at the institution of Madre Rosário.
87	8	"Episode 87"	Carlos Dante and António Gonçalo	Vera Sacramento	23 September 2019	N/A
Maria do Céu finds out that Leonor lied to her!
88	9	"Episode 88"	Carlos Dante and António Gonçalo	Vera Sacramento	24 September 2019	N/A
The Judiciary Police appears at the institution with a search warrant!
89	10	"Episode 89"	Carlos Dante and António Gonçalo	Vera Sacramento	25 September 2019	N/A
Leonor receives a visit from her mother who is shocked to discover that her daughter is dating Caio!
90	11	"Episode 90"	Carlos Dante and António Gonçalo	Vera Sacramento	26 September 2019	N/A
Céu and Amália get closer!
91	12	"Episode 91"	Carlos Dante and António Gonçalo	Vera Sacramento	27 September 2019	N/A
Bruno and Xavier present the accounts of the Bohemian to Céu!
92	13	"Episode 92"	Carlos Dante and António Gonçalo	Vera Sacramento	30 September 2019	N/A
Cremilde tells Branca who is the real Preciosa!
93	14	"Episode 93"	Carlos Dante and António Gonçalo	Vera Sacramento	1 October 2019	N/A
Amália tries to convince Xavier to accept the job in Porto!
94	15	"Episode 94"	Carlos Dante and António Gonçalo	Vera Sacramento	2 October 2019	N/A
Preciosa tells José Luís and Horácio the truth about Branca's mother!
95	16	"Episode 95"	Carlos Dante and António Gonçalo	Vera Sacramento	3 October 2019	N/A
Jessica is getting ready to give birth!
96	17	"Episode 96"	Carlos Dante and António Gonçalo	Vera Sacramento	4 October 2019	N/A
Bruno feels bad on his mother's wedding day!
97	18	"Episode 97"	Carlos Dante and António Gonçalo	Vera Sacramento	7 October 2019	N/A
Leonor and Cláudio inform Bruno about his health.
98	19	"Episode 98"	Carlos Dante and António Gonçalo	Vera Sacramento	8 October 2019	N/A
Silvia is panicked when she sees Father Olavo!
99	20	"Episode 99"	Carlos Dante and António Gonçalo	Vera Sacramento	9 October 2019	N/A
Céu and José Luís get married!
100	21	"Episode 100"	Carlos Dante and António Gonçalo	Vera Sacramento	10 October 2019	N/A
The glass of water is still in the mansion, but the concern for Bruno is enormous!
101	22	"Episode 101"	Carlos Dante and António Gonçalo	Vera Sacramento	11 October 2019	N/A
Xavier discovers that Horácio is your father!
102	23	"Episode 102"	Carlos Dante and António Gonçalo	Vera Sacramento	14 October 2019	N/A
Xavier leaves home and seeks comfort in Patricia!
103	24	"Episode 103"	Carlos Dante and António Gonçalo	Vera Sacramento	15 October 2019	N/A
Caio is the only donor compatible with Bruno. Will he save his brother?
104	25	"Episode 104"	Carlos Dante and António Gonçalo	Vera Sacramento	16 October 2019	N/A
Hesitant in the decision to help Bruno, Caio asks Madre for advice!
105	26	"Episode 105"	Carlos Dante and António Gonçalo	Vera Sacramento	17 October 2019	N/A
Caio blackmails Maria do Céu: the fortune in exchange for Bruno's life!
106	27	"Episode 106"	Carlos Dante and António Gonçalo	Vera Sacramento	18 October 2019	N/A
Caio recalls the abuse he suffered as a child, thinks about the blackmail he did to Maria do Céu and you feel confused.
107	28	"Episode 107"	Carlos Dante and António Gonçalo	Vera Sacramento	21 October 2019	N/A
Caio meets Sílvia before the surgery that will save Bruno's life!
108	29	"Episode 108"	Carlos Dante and António Gonçalo	Vera Sacramento	22 October 2019	N/A
Bruno is taken for surgery. Is Céu's son at risk for his life?
109	30	"Episode 109"	Carlos Dante and António Gonçalo	Vera Sacramento	23 October 2019	N/A
Céu keeps his word and prepares to leave the palace, together with his family.
110	31	"Episode 110"	Carlos Dante and António Gonçalo	Vera Sacramento	24 October 2019	N/A
Xavier refuses to continue working in the Bohemian!
111	32	"Episode 111"	Carlos Dante and António Gonçalo	Vera Sacramento	25 October 2019	N/A
Does Caio want Graciete to continue working on the palace?
112	33	"Episode 112"	Carlos Dante and António Gonçalo	Vera Sacramento	28 October 2019	N/A
Tino has a great idea to help Maria do Céu!
113	34	"Episode 113"	Carlos Dante and António Gonçalo	Vera Sacramento	29 October 2019	N/A
Everyone finds out the truth: After all, Jessica's son’s father is Bruno! How will Tino react?
114	35	"Episode 114"	Carlos Dante and António Gonçalo	Vera Sacramento	30 October 2019	N/A
João Baião is in Alvorinha! What is the reason? Guest star: João Baião as himself
115	36	"Episode 115"	Carlos Dante and António Gonçalo	Vera Sacramento	31 October 2019	N/A
Caio confronts Alice with the role that proves she is pregnant. Will she tell the whole truth?
116	37	"Episode 116"	Carlos Dante and António Gonçalo	Vera Sacramento	1 November 2019	N/A
Caio takes Leonor to the institution and introduces Madre Rosário. Does she recognize her?
117	38	"Episode 117"	Carlos Dante and António Gonçalo	Vera Sacramento	4 November 2019	N/A
Alice begins to realize that something is not right. Did he lose the baby?
118	39	"Episode 118"	Carlos Dante and António Gonçalo	Vera Sacramento	5 November 2019	N/A
Before Caio's anguish and anger, Céu does not hesitate to give him some comfort and love!
119	40	"Episode 119"	Carlos Dante and António Gonçalo	Vera Sacramento	6 November 2019	N/A
Jéssica proposes Bruno in marriage!
120	41	"Episode 120"	Carlos Dante and António Gonçalo	Vera Sacramento	7 November 2019	N/A
Madre Rosário tells Caio that Alice is not who she claims to be!
121	42	"Episode 121"	Carlos Dante and António Gonçalo	Vera Sacramento	8 November 2019	N/A
Teresa is beaten and Carlos then kills himself!
122	43	"Episode 122"	Carlos Dante and António Gonçalo	Vera Sacramento	10 November 2019	N/A
Madre shoots to kill against Céu, when Caio meddles and receives the shot.

=== Season 4 (2020-21) ===
No. overall	No. in season	Title	Directed by	Written by	Original release date	Portugal viewers (millions)
123	1	"Episode 123"	Carlos Dante and António Gonçalo	Vera Sacramento	14 September 2020	N/A
Zé Luís is angry with Maria do Céu on his birthday!
124	2	"Episode 124"	Carlos Dante and António Gonçalo	Vera Sacramento	15 September 2020	N/A
125	3	"Episode 125"	Carlos Dante and António Gonçalo	Vera Sacramento	16 September 2020	N/A
126	4	"Episode 126"	Carlos Dante and António Gonçalo	Vera Sacramento	17 September 2020	N/A
127	5	"Episode 127"	Carlos Dante and António Gonçalo	Vera Sacramento	18 September 2020	N/A
128	6	"Episode 128"	Carlos Dante and António Gonçalo	Vera Sacramento	19 September 2020	N/A
129	7	"Episode 129"	Carlos Dante and António Gonçalo	Vera Sacramento	21 September 2020	N/A
130	8	"Episode 130"	Carlos Dante and António Gonçalo	Vera Sacramento	22 September 2020	N/A
131	9	"Episode 131"	Carlos Dante and António Gonçalo	Vera Sacramento	23 September 2020	N/A
132	10	"Episode 132"	Carlos Dante and António Gonçalo	Vera Sacramento	24 September 2020	N/A
133	11	"Episode 133"	Carlos Dante and António Gonçalo	Vera Sacramento	25 September 2020	N/A
134	12	"Episode 134"	Carlos Dante and António Gonçalo	Vera Sacramento	26 September 2020	N/A
135	13	"Episode 135"	Carlos Dante and António Gonçalo	Vera Sacramento	28 September 2020	N/A
136	14	"Episode 136"	Carlos Dante and António Gonçalo	Vera Sacramento	29 September 2020	N/A
137	15	"Episode 137"	Carlos Dante and António Gonçalo	Vera Sacramento	30 September 2020	N/A
138	16	"Episode 138"	Carlos Dante and António Gonçalo	Vera Sacramento	1 October 2020	N/A
139	17	"Episode 139"	Carlos Dante and António Gonçalo	Vera Sacramento	2 October 2020	N/A
140	18	"Episode 140"	Carlos Dante and António Gonçalo	Vera Sacramento	3 October 2020	N/A
141	19	"Episode 141"	Carlos Dante and António Gonçalo	Vera Sacramento	5 October 2020	N/A
142	20	"Episode 142"	Carlos Dante and António Gonçalo	Vera Sacramento	6 October 2020	N/A
143	21	"Episode 143"	Carlos Dante and António Gonçalo	Vera Sacramento	7 October 2020	N/A
144	22	"Episode 144"	Carlos Dante and António Gonçalo	Vera Sacramento	8 October 2020	N/A
145	23	"Episode 145"	Carlos Dante and António Gonçalo	Vera Sacramento	9 October 2020	N/A
146	24	"Episode 146"	Carlos Dante and António Gonçalo	Vera Sacramento	12 October 2020	N/A
147	25	"Episode 147"	Carlos Dante and António Gonçalo	Vera Sacramento	13 October 2020	N/A
148	26	"Episode 148"	Carlos Dante and António Gonçalo	Vera Sacramento	14 October 2020	N/A
149	27	"Episode 149"	Carlos Dante and António Gonçalo	Vera Sacramento	15 October 2020	N/A
150	28	"Episode 150"	Carlos Dante and António Gonçalo	Vera Sacramento	16 October 2020	N/A
151	29	"Episode 151"	Carlos Dante and António Gonçalo	Vera Sacramento	17 October 2020	N/A
152	30	"Episode 152"	Carlos Dante and António Gonçalo	Vera Sacramento	19 October 2020	N/A
153	31	"Episode 153"	Carlos Dante and António Gonçalo	Vera Sacramento	20 October 2020	N/A
154	32	"Episode 154"	Carlos Dante and António Gonçalo	Vera Sacramento	21 October 2020	N/A
155	33	"Episode 155"	Carlos Dante and António Gonçalo	Vera Sacramento	22 October 2020	N/A
156	34	"Episode 156"	Carlos Dante and António Gonçalo	Vera Sacramento	23 October 2020	N/A
157	35	"Episode 157"	Carlos Dante and António Gonçalo	Vera Sacramento	24 October 2020	N/A
158	36	"Episode 158"	Carlos Dante and António Gonçalo	Vera Sacramento	26 October 2020	N/A
159	37	"Episode 159"	Carlos Dante and António Gonçalo	Vera Sacramento	27 October 2020	N/A
160	38	"Episode 160"	Carlos Dante and António Gonçalo	Vera Sacramento	28 October 2020	N/A
161	39	"Episode 161"	Carlos Dante and António Gonçalo	Vera Sacramento	29 October 2020	N/A
162	40	"Episode 162"	Carlos Dante and António Gonçalo	Vera Sacramento	30 October 2020	N/A
163	41	"Episode 163"	Carlos Dante and António Gonçalo	Vera Sacramento	31 October 2020	N/A
164	42	"Episode 164"	Carlos Dante and António Gonçalo	Vera Sacramento	2 November 2020	N/A
165	43	"Episode 165"	Carlos Dante and António Gonçalo	Vera Sacramento	3 November 2020	N/A
166	44	"Episode 165"	Carlos Dante and António Gonçalo	Vera Sacramento	4 November 2020	N/A
167	45	"Episode 167"	Carlos Dante and António Gonçalo	Vera Sacramento	5 November 2020	N/A
168	46	"Episode 168"	Carlos Dante and António Gonçalo	Vera Sacramento	6 November 2020	N/A
169	47	"Episode 169"	Carlos Dante and António Gonçalo	Vera Sacramento	9 November 2020	N/A
170	48	"Episode 170"	Carlos Dante and António Gonçalo	Vera Sacramento	10 November 2020	N/A
171	49	"Episode 171"	Carlos Dante and António Gonçalo	Vera Sacramento	11 November 2020	N/A
172	50	"Episode 172"	Carlos Dante and António Gonçalo	Vera Sacramento	12 November 2020	N/A
173	51	"Episode 173"	Carlos Dante and António Gonçalo	Vera Sacramento	13 November 2020	N/A
174	52	"Episode 174"	Carlos Dante and António Gonçalo	Vera Sacramento	16 November 2020	N/A
175	53	"Episode 175"	Carlos Dante and António Gonçalo	Vera Sacramento	17 November 2020	N/A
176	54	"Episode 176"	Carlos Dante and António Gonçalo	Vera Sacramento	18 November 2020	N/A
177	55	"Episode 177"	Carlos Dante and António Gonçalo	Vera Sacramento	19 November 2020	N/A
178	56	"Episode 178"	Carlos Dante and António Gonçalo	Vera Sacramento	20 November 2020	N/A
179	57	"Episode 179"	Carlos Dante and António Gonçalo	Vera Sacramento	23 November 2020	N/A
180	58	"Episode 180"	Carlos Dante and António Gonçalo	Vera Sacramento	24 November 2020	N/A
181	59	"Episode 181"	Carlos Dante and António Gonçalo	Vera Sacramento	25 November 2020	N/A
182	60	"Episode 182"	Carlos Dante and António Gonçalo	Vera Sacramento	26 November 2020	N/A
183	61	"Episode 183"	Carlos Dante and António Gonçalo	Vera Sacramento	27 November 2020	N/A
184	62	"Episode 184"	Carlos Dante and António Gonçalo	Vera Sacramento	30 November 2020	N/A
185	63	"Episode 185"	Carlos Dante and António Gonçalo	Vera Sacramento	1 December 2020	N/A
186	64	"Episode 186"	Carlos Dante and António Gonçalo	Vera Sacramento	2 December 2020	N/A
187	65	"Episode 187"	Carlos Dante and António Gonçalo	Vera Sacramento	3 December 2020	N/A
188	66	"Episode 188"	Carlos Dante and António Gonçalo	Vera Sacramento	4 December 2020	N/A
189	67	"Episode 189"	Carlos Dante and António Gonçalo	Vera Sacramento	7 December 2020	N/A
190	68	"Episode 190"	Carlos Dante and António Gonçalo	Vera Sacramento	8 December 2020	N/A
191	69	"Episode 191"	Carlos Dante and António Gonçalo	Vera Sacramento	9 December 2020	N/A
192	70	"Episode 192"	Carlos Dante and António Gonçalo	Vera Sacramento	10 December 2020	N/A
193	71	"Episode 193"	Carlos Dante and António Gonçalo	Vera Sacramento	11 December 2020	N/A
194	72	"Episode 194"	Carlos Dante and António Gonçalo	Vera Sacramento	14 December 2020	N/A
195	73	"Episode 195"	Carlos Dante and António Gonçalo	Vera Sacramento	15 December 2020	N/A
196	74	"Episode 196"	Carlos Dante and António Gonçalo	Vera Sacramento	16 December 2020	N/A
197	75	"Episode 197"	Carlos Dante and António Gonçalo	Vera Sacramento	17 December 2020	N/A
198	76	"Episode 198"	Carlos Dante and António Gonçalo	Vera Sacramento	18 December 2020	N/A
199	77	"Episode 199"	Carlos Dante and António Gonçalo	Vera Sacramento	21 December 2020	N/A
200	78	"Episode 200"	Carlos Dante and António Gonçalo	Vera Sacramento	22 December 2020	N/A
201	79	"Episode 201"	Carlos Dante and António Gonçalo	Vera Sacramento	28 December 2020	N/A
202	80	"Episode 202"	Carlos Dante and António Gonçalo	Vera Sacramento	29 December 2020	N/A
203	81	"Episode 203"	Carlos Dante and António Gonçalo	Vera Sacramento	30 December 2020	N/A
204	82	"Episode 204"	Carlos Dante and António Gonçalo	Vera Sacramento	4 January 2021	N/A
205	83	"Episode 205"	Carlos Dante and António Gonçalo	Vera Sacramento	5 January 2021	N/A
206	84	"Episode 206"	Carlos Dante and António Gonçalo	Vera Sacramento	6 January 2021	N/A
207	85	"Episode 207"	Carlos Dante and António Gonçalo	Vera Sacramento	7 January 2021	N/A
208	86	"Episode 208"	Carlos Dante and António Gonçalo	Vera Sacramento	8 January 2021	N/A
209	87	"Episode 209"	Carlos Dante and António Gonçalo	Vera Sacramento	11 January 2021	N/A
210	88	"Episode 210"	Carlos Dante and António Gonçalo	Vera Sacramento	12 January 2021	N/A
211	89	"Episode 211"	Carlos Dante and António Gonçalo	Vera Sacramento	13 January 2021	N/A
212	90	"Episode 212"	Carlos Dante and António Gonçalo	Vera Sacramento	14 January 2021	N/A
213	91	"Episode 213"	Carlos Dante and António Gonçalo	Vera Sacramento	15 January 2021	N/A
214	92	"Episode 214"	Carlos Dante and António Gonçalo	Vera Sacramento	18 January 2021	N/A
215	93	"Episode 215"	Carlos Dante and António Gonçalo	Vera Sacramento	19 January 2021	N/A
216	94	"Episode 216"	Carlos Dante and António Gonçalo	Vera Sacramento	20 January 2021	N/A
217	95	"Episode 217"	Carlos Dante and António Gonçalo	Vera Sacramento	21 January 2021	N/A
218	96	"Episode 218"	Carlos Dante and António Gonçalo	Vera Sacramento	22 January 2021	N/A
219	97	"Episode 219"	Carlos Dante and António Gonçalo	Vera Sacramento	25 January 2021	N/A
220	98	"Episode 220"	Carlos Dante and António Gonçalo	Vera Sacramento	26 January 2021	N/A
221	99	"Episode 221"	Carlos Dante and António Gonçalo	Vera Sacramento	27 January 2021	N/A
222	100	"Episode 222"	Carlos Dante and António Gonçalo	Vera Sacramento	28 January 2021	N/A
223	101	"Episode 223"	Carlos Dante and António Gonçalo	Vera Sacramento	29 January 2021	N/A
224	102	"Episode 224"	Carlos Dante and António Gonçalo	Vera Sacramento	1 February 2021	N/A
225	103	"Episode 225"	Carlos Dante and António Gonçalo	Vera Sacramento	2 February 2021	N/A
226	104	"Episode 226"	Carlos Dante and António Gonçalo	Vera Sacramento	3 February 2021	N/A
227	105	"Episode 227"	Carlos Dante and António Gonçalo	Vera Sacramento	4 February 2021	N/A
228	106	"Episode 228"	Carlos Dante and António Gonçalo	Vera Sacramento	5 February 2021	N/A
229	107	"Episode 229"	Carlos Dante and António Gonçalo	Vera Sacramento	8 February 2021	N/A
230	108	"Episode 230"	Carlos Dante and António Gonçalo	Vera Sacramento	9 February 2021	N/A
231	109	"Episode 231"	Carlos Dante and António Gonçalo	Vera Sacramento	10 February 2021	N/A
232	110	"Episode 232"	Carlos Dante and António Gonçalo	Vera Sacramento	11 February 2021	N/A
233	111	"Episode 233"	Carlos Dante and António Gonçalo	Vera Sacramento	12 February 2021	N/A
234	112	"Episode 234"	Carlos Dante and António Gonçalo	Vera Sacramento	15 February 2021	N/A
235	113	"Episode 235"	Carlos Dante and António Gonçalo	Vera Sacramento	16 February 2021	N/A
236	114	"Episode 236"	Carlos Dante and António Gonçalo	Vera Sacramento	17 February 2021	N/A
237	115	"Episode 237"	Carlos Dante and António Gonçalo	Vera Sacramento	19 February 2021	N/A
238	116	"Episode 238"	Carlos Dante and António Gonçalo	Vera Sacramento	20 February 2021	N/A
