= Maria João Abreu =

Portuguese actress (1964–2021)

- Born: Maria João Gonçalves de Abreu; 14 April 1964; Lisbon, Portugal
- Died: 13 May 2021 (aged 57); Hospital Garcia de Orta, Almada, Cova da Piedade, Pragal e Cacilhas, Almada, Portugal
- Occupation: Actress
- Years active: 1983–2021

Maria João Gonçalves Abreu Soares (Lisboa, 14 April 1964 – Almada, 13 May 2021), known as Maria João Abreu, was a Portuguese film, television and stage actress. Her most notable works include Portuguese TV series Médico de Família, Aqui Não Há Quem Viva, Golpe de Sorte, and her strong presence in the typical Portuguese genre of "teatro de revista". She was famous for her uplifting roles, mostly associated with humour.

== Biography ==
Maria João Abreu was born in Lisboa on 14 April 1964.

Between 1985 and 2008, she was married to fellow actor José Raposo, with whom she had two sons: Miguel Raposo and Ricardo Raposo. Despite the divorce, the two willingly worked together in several productions and remained good friends. She married musician João Soares in September 2012.

In November 2020, she tested positive for COVID-19, but recovered. Her father, who already had lung cancer, died of the disease.

On 30 April 2021, after fainting during the recording of episodes of the Portuguese telenovela A Serra, she was admitted to Hospital Garcia de Orta, in Almada, where she was diagnosed with a ruptured brain aneurysm and put into an induced coma. After multiple surgeries and complications, Abreu died on 13 May 2021, aged 57.

== Television ==
Year(s)	Work	Channel	Role	Notes
1988	Uma Bomba Chamada Etelvina	RTP 1	-	First work for television
1989	Canto Alegre	RTP 1	-	
1990	O Posto	RTP 1	Maria dos Anjos	
1990	O Cacilheiro do Amor	RTP 1	-	
1993	Cos(z)ido à Portuguesa	TVI	-	
1994	Trapos e Companhia	TVI	-	
1994	Quem Casa Quer Casa	TVI	-	
1994–95	Isto É o Agildo	RTP	-	
1994–95	Cabaret	RTP	-	
1995	A Mulher do Senhor Ministro	RTP	Empregada	
1995	Nico D'Obra	RTP	Rapariga	
1995	Camilo & Filho Lda.	SIC	Amélia Marques	
1995	Big Show SIC	SIC	-	
1996	Os Malucos do Riso	SIC	-	
1996	Queridas e Maduras	RTP	-	
1996	Polícias	RTP	Mulher de Joaquim	
1996	Vidas de Sal	RTP	Celeste	
1998	Não Há Duas Sem Três	RTP	Branquinha	
1999	As Lições do Tonecas	RTP	-	
1998–2000	Médico de Família	SIC	Lucinda	Abreu's most popular role
2000–01	O Fura-Vidas	SIC	Graciete	
2000–01	Jardins Proibidos	TVI	Anabela Morais	
2001	A Senhora das Águas	RTP	Maria dos Prazeres	
2002	Bons Vizinhos	TVI	Margarida "Guida" Santos	
2006–08	Aqui Não Há Quem Viva	SIC	Dulce Costa	
2007–08	Morangos Com Açúcar	TVI	Marília Ferreira	
2007–10	Conta-me como foi	RTP	Clara de Jesus González	
2008	Casos da Vida	TVI	-	
2008–09	Feitiço de Amor	TVI	Sofia Reis	
2009	A Minha Família	RTP	Luísa	
2009–10	Ele é Ela	TVI	Lara Nobre	
2009–10	Sentimentos	TVI	Julieta Dias	
2010	Cidade Despida	RTP	Mãe de Alexandra	
2010	Regresso a Sizalinda	RTP	-	
2010	A Noite do Fim do Mundo	RTP	Emília	
2010–11	Espírito Indomável	TVI	Glória	
2011	Liberdade 21	RTP	-	
2011	Pai à Força	RTP	Carlota	
2011	Remédio Santo	TVI	Cândida	
2011	A Família Mata	SIC	Mónica Souda	
2011	A Casa é Minha	TVI	Estrela	Only broadcast in 2016
2013	Mundo ao Contrário	TVI	Susana	
2014	Mulheres de Abril	RTP	Elisa	
2014–15	Os Nossos Dias	RTP	Leonor Cardoso	
2014	Mar Salgado	SIC	Cremilde Santos	
2015	Donos Disto Tudo	RTP	várias personagens	
2016–17	Amor Maior	SIC	Dolores Matias	
2017–18	Paixão	SIC	Isabel Galvão	
2019	Sul	RTP	Alexandra Chambel	
2019–20	Golpe de Sorte	SIC	Maria do Céu Garcia	First main role
2020	A Máscara	SIC	herself (disguised as "O Monstro")	
2020–21	Patrões Fora	SIC	Palmira Barata	Shooting at time of death
2021	Estamos em Casa	SIC	host	
2021	A Serra	SIC	Conceição "Sãozinha" Grilo	Shooting at time of death; last work in television

== Cinema ==
- Amo-te Teresa (2000), by Ricardo Espírito Santo and Cristina Boavida
- Telefona-me! (2000), by Frederico Corado
- Call Girl (2007), by António-Pedro Vasconcelos
- A Mãe é que Sabe (2016), by Nuno Rocha
- Submissão (2019), by Leonardo António
