= Os Nossos Dias =

Portuguese telenovela

- Developed by: SP Televisão
- Directed by: Duarte Teixeira; Paulo Brito; António Figueirinha
- Starring: Pedro Laginha; Anabela Teixeira
- Country of origin: Portugal
- Original language: Portuguese
- No. of episodes: 610

Production
- Running time: 45 minutes

Original release
- Network: RTP1
- Release: September 16, 2013 – April 8, 2016

Os Nossos Dias (English: Our Days) is a Portuguese telenovela broadcast on RTP1.

== Cast ==
- Pedro Laginha
- Anabela Teixeira
- Débora Monteiro
- Carla Maciel
- Orlando Costa
- Sara Norte
- Luís Lucas
- Luís Gaspar
- Ana Guiomar
- Luís Mascarenhas
- Sandra Faleiro
- Joaquim Nicolau
- Inês Faria
- Marta Fernandes
- Helder Agapito
- Luís Vicente
- Duarte Gomes
- Sisley Dias

== Synopsis ==
A popular soap opera (or telenovela) in Portugal running from 2013 to present, Os Nossos Dias follows the daily lives of its many characters. Among the typical soap opera-esque romances featured in the show, significant social-awareness issues have also been featured, i.e., domestic violence, living with HIV, and homophobia. Despite the thoughtful, progressive, and socially responsible scripts and production of Os Nossos Dias, in 2015, RTP (the national television station airing the show), garnered widespread international criticism for censoring two scenes showing two of the major male characters, portrayed by Duarte Gomes and Sisley Dias, kissing as part of a major 'coming out' gay storyline.
