= Dânia Neto =

Portuguese actress (born 1983)

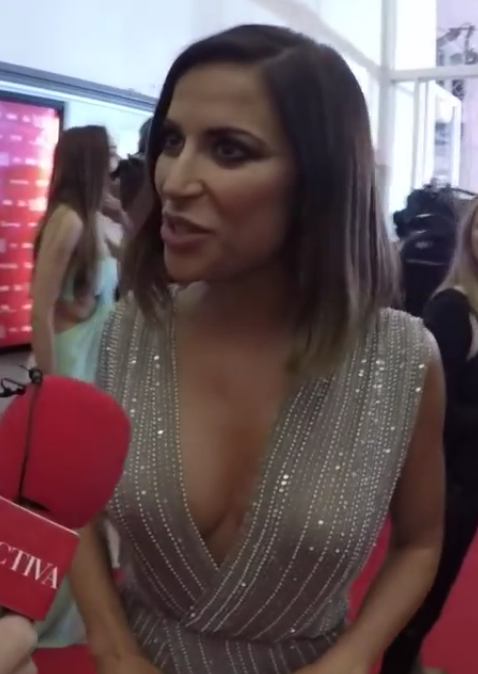
- Dânia Neto in the XXII Portuguese Golden Globes, in 2017
- Born: Dânia de Carvalho Neto; March 23, 1983 (age 43); Loulé, Portugal
- Occupations: Actress; model
- Spouse: Luís Matos Cunha (m. 2024)
- Children: 2

Dânia de Carvalho Neto (born March 23, 1983) is a Portuguese actress and model.

Born in Loulé, in Algarve region, and primarily a model, she initiated her career through several spots advertising executives and became popular with her works in television, participating in soap operas and series such as Maré Alta (2004), Morangos com Açúcar (2005), Camilo em Sarilhos (2005), Mundo Meu (2006), Tempo de Viver (2006) and Laços de Sangue (2010).

== Personal life ==
On April 13, 2024, she married dentist Luís Matos Cunha, with whom she has two children: Salvador, born on December 6, 2018 and António Maria, born on September 14, 2023.

== Filmography ==
Year	Project	Role	Notes	Channel
2004–2005	Maré Alta	Passenger	Special Participation	SIC
2005–2006	Morangos com Açúcar (Season 2)	Maria Vicente	Main Cast	TVI
2005–2006	Morangos com Açúcar (Season 3)	Maria Vicente	Main Cast	TVI
2005–2006	Mundo Meu	Laura Antunes	Main Cast	TVI
2006–2007	Tempo de Viver	Daniela Monteiro e Castro	Main Cast	TVI
2008	Olhos nos Olhos	Amante de Vítor	Additional Cast	TVI
2008	Casos da Vida	Carla Gomes	Protagonist	TVI
2008	Camilo em Sarilhos	Mónica	Main Cast	SIC
2008	Camilo em Sarilhos	Valerinha	Main Cast	SIC
2008	Floribella	Nádia	Special Participation	SIC
2008–2009	Vila Faia	Laura Afonso	Main Cast	RTP1
2009	Um Lugar para Viver	Carmen	Special Participation	RTP1
2010–2011	Laços de Sangue	Marisa Pereira	Main Cast	SIC
2011–2012	Lua Vermelha	Eva	Special Participation	SIC
2011–2012	Rosa Fogo	Glória Rufino	Main Cast	SIC
2012	Maternidade	Marisa	Additional Cast	RTP1
2013	Sinais de Vida	Dr.ª Margarida Nogueira	Main Cast	RTP1
2013	Hotel Cinco Estrelas	Joana	Protagonist	RTP1
2013	Bem-Vindos a Beirais	Vera	Additional Cast	RTP1
2013–2014	Sol de Inverno	Benedita Lage	Main Cast	SIC
2014	Vale Tudo (Season 2)	Herself	Fixed Cast	SIC
2015–2016	Poderosas	Bruna Filipa Rocha de Mamede	Main Cast	SIC
2016	Mulheres Assim	Mariana	Main Cast	RTP1
2016–2017	Amor Maior	Liliana Faria	Main Cast	SIC
2017	Vale Tudo (Season 3)	Herself	Fixed Cast	SIC
2018	Excursões Air Lino	Anita	Protagonist	RTP1
2018–2019	Alma e Coração	Francisca Frois	Co-Antagonist	SIC
2019	Golpe de Sorte	Sílvia Mira	Antagonist	SIC
2019	Golpe de Sorte	Miriam Barbosa Sousa Vale (fake name)	Antagonist	SIC
2019	Golpe de Sorte	Madre Dolores (fake name)	Antagonist	SIC
2019	Golpe de Sorte: Um Conto de Natal	Sílvia Mira	Protagonist; Telefilm	SIC
2020–2021	Terra Brava	Cândida «Candy» Santinho	Main Cast	SIC
2020–2021	Golpe de Sorte IV	Sílvia Mira	Protagonista	SIC
2020–2021	Golpe de Sorte IV	Andreia Mira	Antagonist	SIC
2021	Estamos em Casa	Herslef	Presenter, alongside Maria João Abreu, José Raposo and Jorge Corrula	SIC
2021–2022	A Serra	Paula Neto	Main Cast	SIC
2022–2023	Por Ti	Armanda Silva	Main Cast	SIC
2023–2024	Flor Sem Tempo	Mariana Campos	Co-Antagonist	SIC
2025–2026	A Herança	Inês Cardoso	Main Cast	SIC
2026	Destino Maior	Dalila Barriga	Main Cast	SIC
