= José Carlos Pereira =

Brazilian Air Force officer

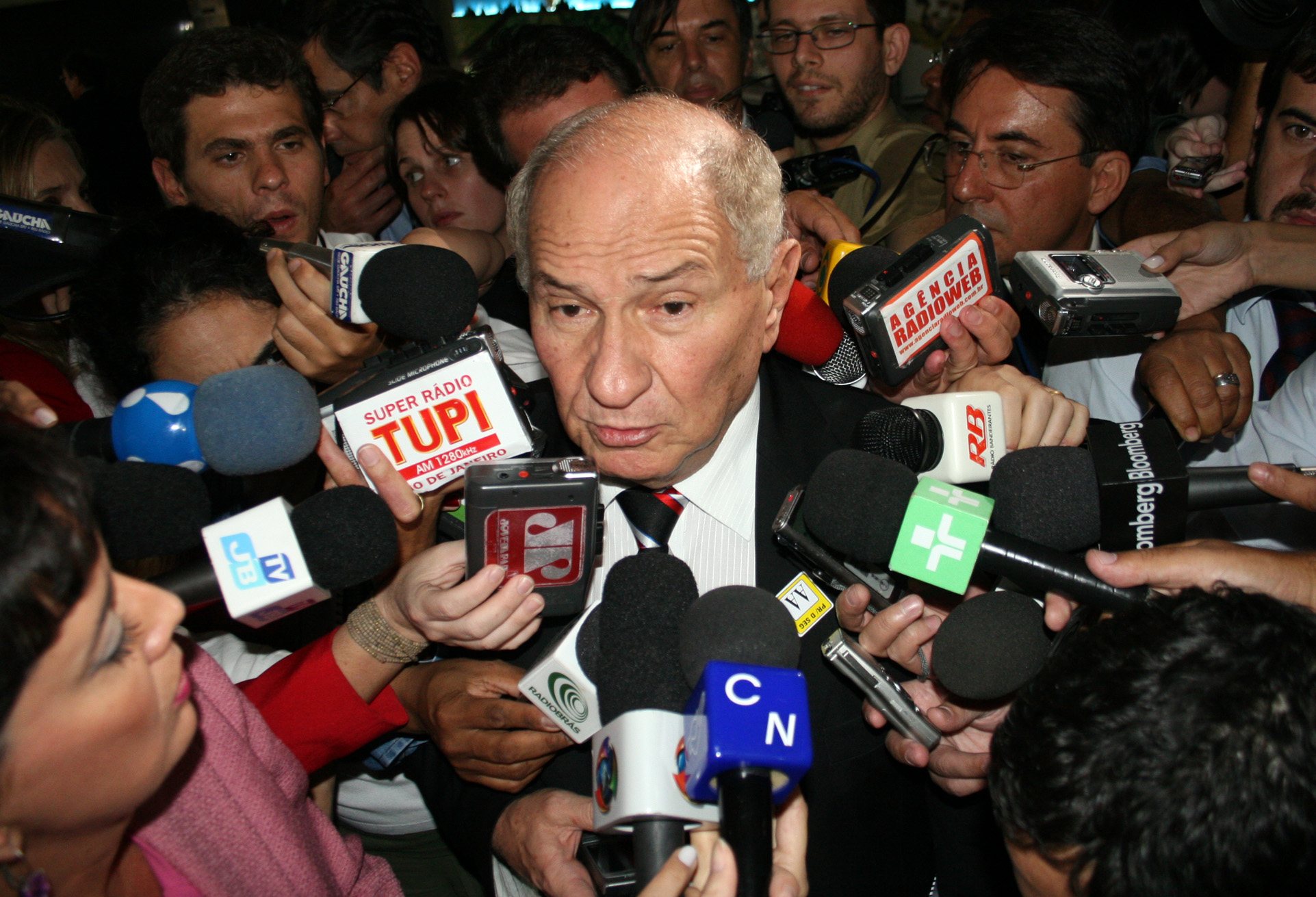
José Carlos Pereira

José Carlos Pereira was a Brazilian Air Force officer. He joined the FAB in March 1958, graduated as an officer in December 1963, and reached the rank of lieutenant brigadier general, serving as Brazil's delegate to the Inter-American Defense Board, Commander of the Air Force Academy (AFA), Commander of the Brazilian Aerospace Defense Command (Comando de Defesa Aeroespacial Brasileiro (COMDABRA)), and Commander of the General Command of Air Operations (Comando-Geral de Operações Aéreas (COMGAR)). He was also the former president of Infraero. He died on September 4, 2020.
