= Ana Malhoa =

- Born: Ana Sofia Lopes Malhoa; 6 August 1979 (age 46); São Sebastião da Pedreira, Lisbon, Portugal
- Other names: Queen of Portuguese Pop; Queen of "Pimba" Music; Lil' Queen of Reggaeton; La Bomba; La Makina; Turbinada; Ampulheta
- Occupations: Singer-songwriter, actress, tv host, businesswoman
- Years active: 1985–present
- Spouse: Jorge Moreira (m. 1998-2016)
- Children: Índia Malhoa Moreira (b. 1999)
- Musical career
- Genres: Portuguese Popular Music; Pimba; Latin pop; pop; Reggaeton
- Instrument: Vocals
- Labels: Espacial; Som Livre; Universal Music Group; Paradise Entertainment; La Dueña Records

Ana Sofia Lopes Malhoa Moreira known as Ana Malhoa (born 6 August 1979) is a Portuguese singer-songwriter, TV host, actress and businesswoman. She started her career performing with her father José Malhoa, a popular Portuguese singer, in 1985. With her father, she released seven extended plays between 1986 and 1995. At age of 15 she was cast the host of the children's variety show Buéréré, releasing albums with platinum status and becoming a pop icon in the lusophone countries. In 2000, she released her first studio album, and since then she is the best selling pop artist in Portugal, with sales of over 635,000 copies.

== Early life ==
Ana Malhoa was born in Lisbon on 6 August 1979, daughter of popular singer José Malhoa and Angelina Lopes. She has four half brothers of different mothers and two brothers of different father. She was raised by her stepmother Rosa, who died in 2012, at age of 73. She completed the secondary education as a pop star. The biological mother of Ana, Angelina Lopes, became pregnant of José Malhoa when he was already married to Rosa Malhoa. Three months after giving birth to Ana Malhoa, Angelina Lopes died. At age of 12, Ana found a photo album of Angelina and find out that Rosa was not her biological mother.

In 1998 she married her teenage boyfriend Jorge Moreira (b. 1976) She was married till 2016. She gave birth to their first child, Índia Malhoa, in 1999. Índia is also a singer in Portugal.

== Discography ==
Studio albums

- Ana Malhoa (2000)
- Por Amor (2001)
- Eu (2003)
- Eu Sou Latina (2004)
- Nada Me Pára (2007)
- Exótica (2008)
- Sexy (2009)
- Caliente (2011)
- Azucar (2013)
- Superlatina (2015)

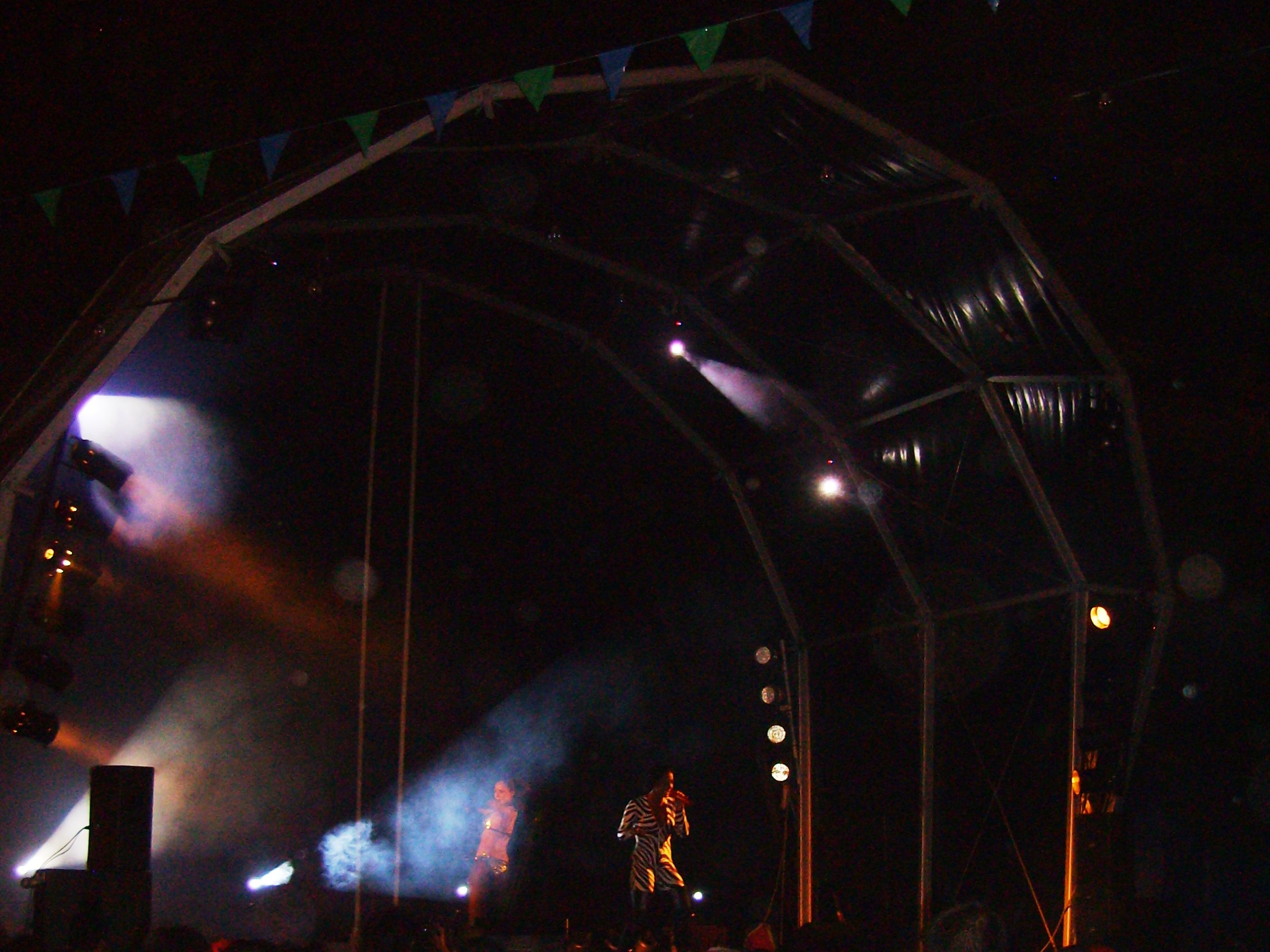
Ana Malhoa performing at Peter González Festival in Vila do Porto, Azores, 2010

== Filmography ==
Television
Year	Title	Role	Notes
1988	O Grande Pagode	Host	
1989	Natal dos Hospitais 1989	Host	
1994	Parabéns (RTP)	Herself	Episódio: "1º de janeiro de 1994"
1994–98	Buéréré	Host	
1995	Big Show SIC	Host	
1995	Globos de Ouro 1995	Host	
1996–99	Super Buéréré	Host	
1996	Globos de Ouro 1996	Host	
1997	Globos de Ouro 1997	Host	
1998	Globos de Ouro 1998	Host	
1999	Globos de Ouro 1999	Host	
2002	Domingo Fantástico	Host	
2008	Luar	Herself	Episódio: "9 de maio de 2008"
2008	VIP Manicure	Herself	Episódio: #4
2013	Destinos Cruzados	Herself	Episódios: #12 e #13
2019	Golpe de Sorte	Herself	
