= Diogo Amaral =

Portuguese actor (born 1981)

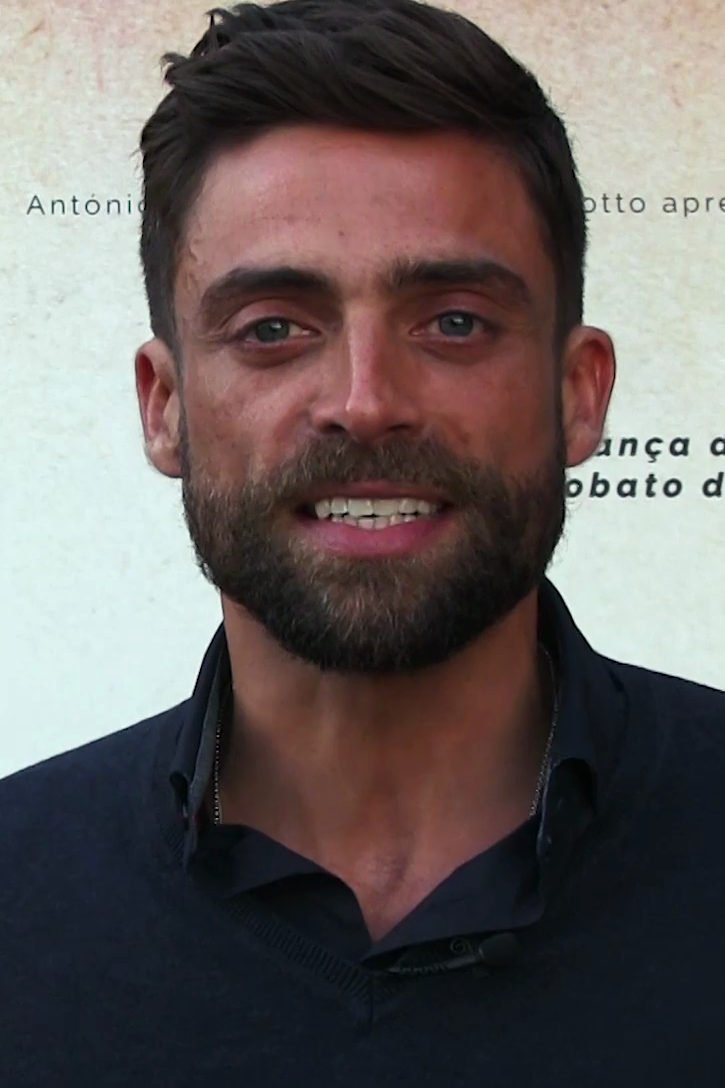
- Amaral in 2018
- Born: Diogo Maria Mendes Leal Pereira do Amaral; 26 November 1981 (age 44); Lisbon, Portugal
- Occupations: Actor; model
- Years active: 2001–present

Diogo Maria Mendes Leal Pereira do Amaral (born 26 November 1981) is a Portuguese actor and model who voices foreign media in the European Portuguese language.

== Voice roles ==
=== Television ===
- Main cast, Gustavo Martins in A Impostora, TVI 2016
- Protagonist, Eduardo Câmara in Jardins Proibidos (2014), TVI 2014/2015
- Protagonist, Pedro Belmonte in Belmonte, TVI 2013/2014
- Protagonist, Tiago in Doce Tentação, TVI 2012/2013
- Protagonist, Diogo Tavares in Sentimentos, TVI 2009/2010
- Main cast, Joaquim Carvalho e Silva in Olhos nos Olhos, TVI, 2008/2009
- Main cast, Zé Maria in Equador, TVI, 2008
- Main cast, João in Casos da Vida (O Pedido), TVI, 2008
- Main cast, Gonçalo in Casos da Vida (Primavera todo o ano), TVI, 2008
- Main cast, Leonardo in Casos da Vida (O Caso Mariana), TVI, 2008
- Protagonist, Óscar (em 1961) in Fascínios, TVI, 2007
- Special participation, Inácio in Vingança, SIC, 2007
- Special participation, Estafeta in Aqui não há quem viva, SIC, 2006
- Protagonist, Frederico Fritzenwalden in Floribella, SIC, 2006/2007
- Main cast, Guilherme Gomes in Mundo Meu, TVI, 2005
- Antagonist, Ricardo Moura Bastos in Morangos com Açúcar, TVI, 2003/2004
- Main cast, Martim Sousa in Sonhos Traídos, TVI, 2001/2002

=== Television animation ===
- The Grim Adventures of Billy & Mandy – Secondary characters (2001–2007)

=== Animated films ===
- Arthur and the Minimoys – Additional voices (2006)
- M&M's-3. Fifth Sweet – The Red Savages by nickname Ron Maggy (2012)
