= Duarte Gomes =

Portuguese football referee

- Full name: Duarte Nuno Pereira Gomes
- Born: 16 January 1973 (age 53); Funchal, Madeira, Portugal

Domestic
Years	League	Role
1997-2016	Primeira Liga	Referee

International
Years	League	Role
2002–2016	FIFA listed	Referee

Duarte Nuno Pereira Gomes (born 16 January 1973) is a Portuguese retired football referee and media personality.

He started his career as a referee in 1991 at the district levels, ascending gradually to the first national category in 1997. He became an international referee in 2002. Besides domestic competitions, he also officiated at UEFA and FIFA matches.

He participated in UEFA Euro 2012 as a goal-line official on the team led by Pedro Proença, officiating in four matches, including the final.

He retired in 2016 and dedicated to media interests. He participated in the football programme O Dia Seguinte at SIC Notícias, where he comments about controversial refereeing decisions. He previously authored the programme Ó Sr. Árbitro, also at SIC Notícias, which shed a light on refereeing in district football competitions. He is also the author of the book and website Kickoff, launched in August 2017, which aims to explain the game rules and the role of the referees to the general public.
