= Manuela Maria =

Portuguese actress

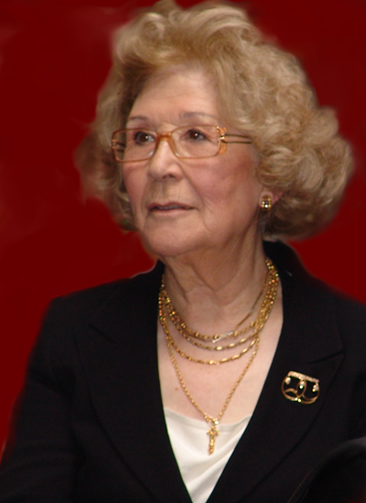
- Born: 26 January 1935 (age 91); Lisbon, Portugal
- Occupation: Actor
- Years active: 1961–present
- Notable work: A Mãe é que Sabe; Mundo ao Contrário
- Spouse: Armando Cortez (m. 1966; died 2002)

Maria Manuela Guerra Lima Cortez e Almeida (born 26 January 1935) is a Portuguese actress. She co-starred in the film A Mãe é que Sabe. Her television credits include Santa Bárbara, Doce Fugitiva, Deixa Que Te Leve, Remédio Santo and Mundo ao Contrário.

Maria was born in Lisbon.
