= José Raposo =

Portuguese actor

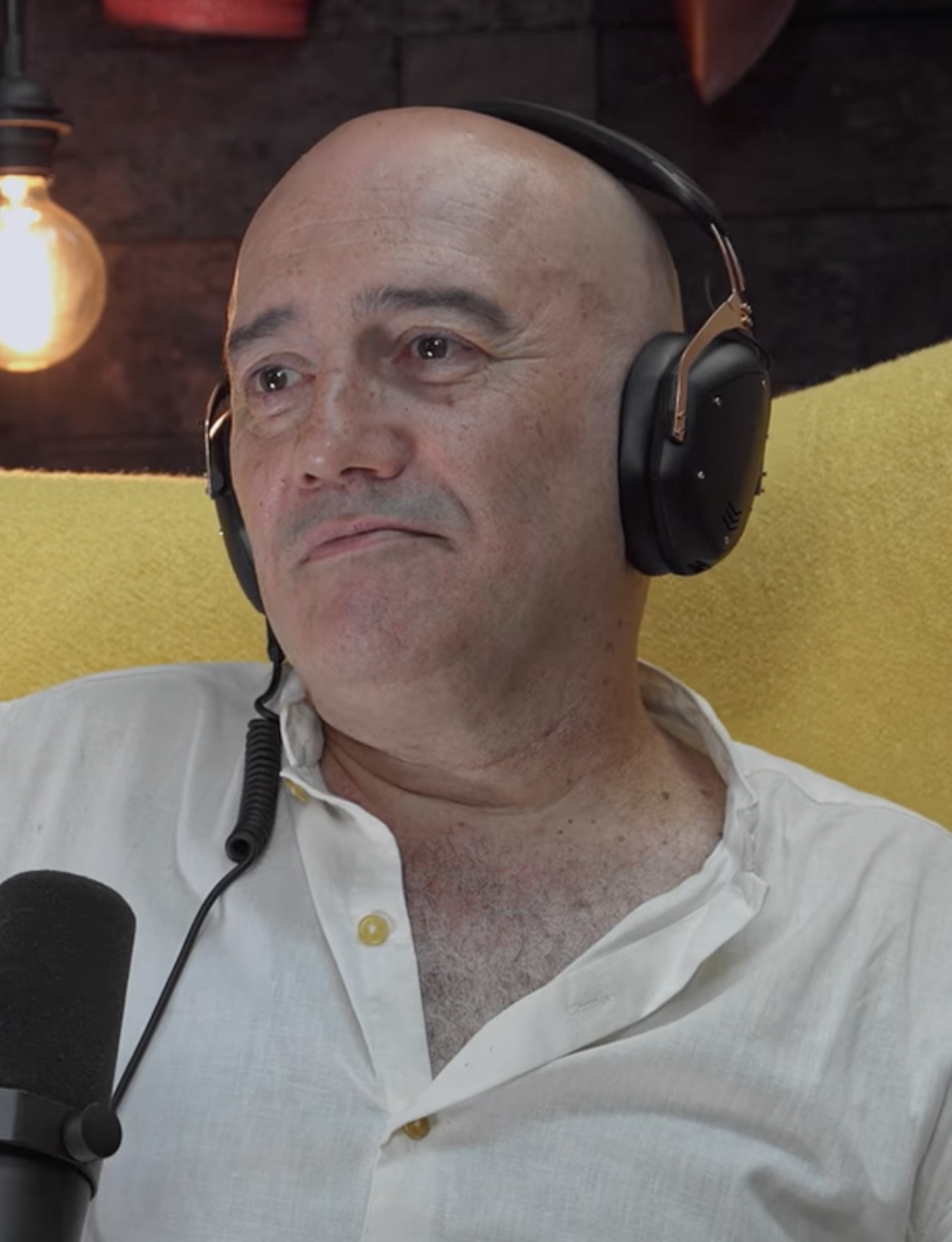
- Raposo in 2020
- Born: José Sá Raposo; 3 February 1962 (age 64); Dundo, Portuguese Angola
- Occupations: Actor; producer
- Years active: 1981–present

José Sá Raposo (born 3 February 1962) is a Portuguese actor and producer.

== Biography ==
He began in the children's theater, by the hand of Francisco Nicholson in 1981 at the Teatro AdHoc, which company he integrated. He did Teatro de Revista (light comedy theater) on the Teatro Maria Vitória, Teatro Variedades and Teatro ABC, founded with his ex-wife Maria João Abreu the production company A Toca dos Raposos, with which he staged some shows.

He played O Processo de Jesus, from Diego Fabri (Teatro da Trindade); Volpone from Ben Jonson in Teatro Aberto; O Último dos Marialvas from Neil Simon, in Casa da Comédia. He was directed by Jean Jordheuil in Germânia 3 of Heiner Müller (CCB) and by André Gago in Os Portas, from John Godber in Teatro Nacional D. Maria II. He also played in Musical Theater, and made part of Annie of Thomas Meehan, under the direction of A. Cortez in Teatro Maria Matos.

He participated in 2003 in the show Cada Dia Um a Um a Liberdade e o Reino, directed by Jorge Silva Melo and worked with Filipe La Féria in A Rainha do Ferro Velho, of Garçon Kanin in Teatro Politeama in 2004.

He did television and was part of the cast of several soap operas and TV shows (2002 – Bons Vizinhos, 1998 – Ballet Rose from Leonel Vieira, 1998 – Médico de Família, 1995 – Pensão Estrela, 1990 – O Posto, 1990 – O Cacilheiro do Amor, 2007/08, 2009 – Conta-me como foi, 2007 – Resistirei) and movies directed by Ruy Guerra, Tiago Guedes and Rita Nunes.

In cinema he was actor in some movies: Aqui na Terra (1993) from João Botelho; Sapatos Pretos (1998), Ganhar a Vida (2001) and Noite Escura (2004) from João Canijo; Os Mutantes (1998) from Teresa Villaverde; Corte de Cabelo (1995) from Joaquim Sapinho; Viúva Rica Solteira Não Fica (2006) from José Fonseca e Costa; Senhor Jerónimo (1998) from Inês de Medeiros; Camarate (2001) from Luís Filipe Rocha, A Costa dos Murmúrios (2005) from Margarida Cardoso, Filme da Treta (2006) from José Sacramento and Call Girl (2007). Participou na série O Testamento para a RTP.

Presently he plays in Filipe La Féria's recent show La Cage Aux Folles, premiered on 13 June in Teatro Rivoli, and now in Lisbon in Teatro Politeama, playing Zaza Napoli.

He won the Portuguese Golden Globe for best Theater Actor in 2009.

== Dubbing ==
- Sr.Bogus
- The Lion King
- The Hunchback of Notre Dame and The Hunchback of Notre Dame II
- Hercules
- Lady and the Tramp
- Toy Story trilogy
- Kung Fu Panda
- Cars
- Wreck-It Ralph
- Monsters University
- ChalkZone

== Television ==
- Pensão estrela – 1995 (SIC)
- Malucos do Riso – (SIC)
- Nós os Ricos – 1997 (RTP)
- Médico de Família – 1998 to 2000 (SIC)
- Bons Vizinhos – 2002 (TVI)
- O Testamento – 2007 (RTP)
- Resistirei – 2007 (SIC)
- Rebelde Way – 2008 (SIC)
- Conta-me Como Foi – 2007 to 2009 (RTP)
- Espírito Indomável – 2010 (TVI)
- Coração d'Ouro – 2015 to 2016 (SIC)
- Golpe de Sorte – 2019 (SIC)
