= Ana Guiomar =

Portuguese actress (born 1988)

- Born: Ana Guiomar Dias Reis Pereira; 26 August 1988 (age 38); Lisbon, Portugal

Ana Guiomar Dias Reis Pereira (born 26 August 1988) is a Portuguese actress, known for her character Marta Navarro in the youthful series, "Morangos com Açúcar" (2004–2006). Later she appeared in the soap opera, "Tempo de Viver" (2006–2007).
