= Jorge Corrula =

Portuguese actor and fashion model

- Born: 16 March 1978 (age 48); Portugal
- Occupation: Actor
- Years active: 2004–present

Jorge Corrula (born 16 March 1978) is a Portuguese actor and fashion model. He got his first major role in the hit teen series Morangos com Açúcar (2004). Later, was a cast member of various television productions: Resistirei (2007/08), Floribella (2006/08), Sete Vidas (2006/07), Mistura Fina (2004/05) among others.

In 2004, he was cast as the title character of the 2005 film O Crime do Padre Amaro.

== Filmography ==
- Vampiro (2005)
- O Crime do Padre Amaro (2005)

== Television ==
=== Telenovelas ===
- A Promessa (2024)
- Flor sem Tempo (2023)
- Mar de Paixão (2010)
- Flor do Mar (2008)
- Resistirei (2007)

=== Series ===
- Destino Imortal (2010)
- Uma Aventura na Casa Assombrada (2009)
- Aqui não há quem viva (2008)
- 7 Vidas (2006)
