= List of Angolan actors =

This is a list of notable actors and actresses from, or associated with, Angola.

== A ==
- Jorge Antunes

== B ==
- Tânia Burity

== C ==
- Erica Chissapa
- Fredy Costa

== D ==
- Filipe Duarte (actor)

== F ==
- Hoji Fortuna

== G ==
- Mel Gambôa

== J ==
- Heloísa Jorge

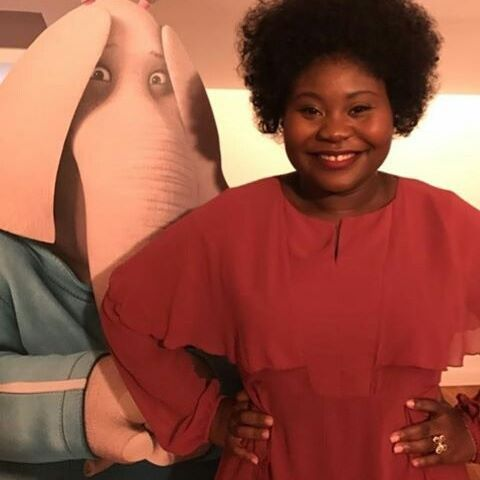
Deolinda Kinzimba, 2016

== K ==
- Deolinda Kinzimba

== L ==
- Pedro Lima

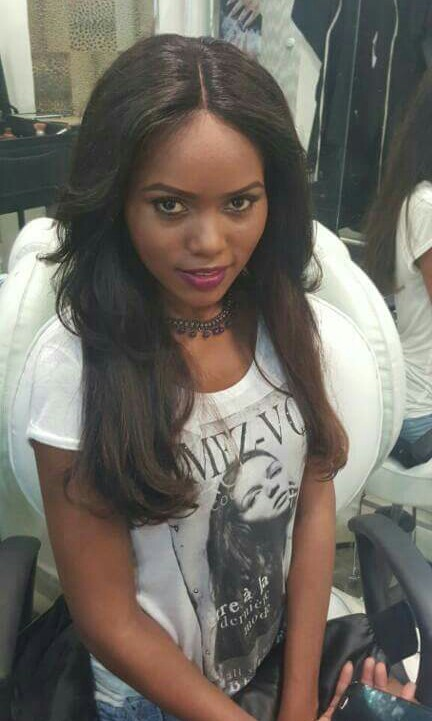
Helena Moreno, 2016

== M ==
- Helena Moreno

== N ==
- Sílvio Nascimento

== P ==
- Lesliana Pereira

== S ==
- Eric Santos
- Orlando Sérgio

== V ==
- Gilmário Vemba

== See also ==
- List of Angolans
- Cinema of Angola
