= Nazaré season 1 =

Nazaré
- Season 1
- Starring: Carolina Loureiro; José Mata; Afonso Pimentel
- No. of episodes: 211; 96 (1st phase); 115 (2nd phase)

Release
- Original network: SIC
- Original release: September 9, 2019 – July 5, 2020

Season chronology
- Next → Season 2

The first season of Nazaré began airing on SIC on September 9, 2019 and ended on July 5, 2020.

== Plot ==
=== 1st phase ===
Nazaré Gomes (Carolina Loureiro) to save her mother, she is forced to betray Duarte Blanco (José Mata), a playboy, the son of a furniture industry tycoon. He always had everything he wanted and the best money can buy. He loves fast cars, women and never worked.

Nazaré is Matilde's only daughter (Custódia Gallego). The father, Joaquim (Rogério Samora), left them when Nazaré was still small. From that time there were the memories of the successive depressions of the mother, who never conformed.

Years later, a brain tumor was diagnosed in Matilde and Nazaré is the only one who takes care of her. They only have each other. The smallest family in the world. The only thing he knows about his father is that he committed murder, ran away and left his mother in despair.

Nazaré only thinks about doing whatever it takes to save her mother. Her many researches lead her to a London surgeon, who has already been successful in cases similar to her mother's, a doctor as effective as she is expensive.

Glória Silva (Luisa Cruz), owns a restaurant. She has two children, Matias Silva (Pedro Sousa) and Toni Silva (Afonso Pimentel). Both help the mother in the family business, but they also dedicate themselves to obscure matters.

Matias dates Patricia (Aurea), but is secretly in love with Nazaré. She is assaulting Quinta dos Blanco together with her boyfriend, after he convinces her that the fire is far away. But the wind makes the fire suddenly change direction and corner them. In the midst of the panic, the two separate, and that's where Nazaré finds Duarte and takes him out of hell.

The survival alliance that the two forged that night turns them into heroes, causing intense feelings to arise.

But it all ends as suddenly as it begins. Duarte is injured and is taken to the hospital, where he remains unconscious.

An exchange of data causes it to be presumed dead. For Félix Blanco (Albano Jerónimo) and Verónica Blanco (Sandra Barata Belo) it is time to celebrate and keep the spoils of the crimes.

But the scheme of both takes an unexpected turn, when Duarte appears at funeral ceremonies, determined to assume his inheritance.

Tragedy changes you profoundly. He is not suspicious of his uncle's involvement in his father's death and continues to entrust him with the vice-presidency of Atlântida, but he wants to assume the presidency and become someone of whom António would be proud.

Félix is furious with the failure, but he knows that a new attack would raise suspicions. Afraid that Nazaré has seen more than she should, she looks for her.

At that time, he realizes that she is unaware of his involvement in the fires and realizes that Duarte's attachment to Nazaré may serve his purposes.

With that in mind, the villain makes him the offer: give him money to operate on his mother if, in return, she seduces her nephew and agrees to do whatever he says. Otherwise, it has the means to accuse Nazaré of the fire and the death of some people. Cornered, she gives in to blackmail.

The scheme to catch Duarte is designed in detail by Félix and Nazaré will follow the plan to the letter ... but it will not be as easy as she thought.

In addition to the fierce opposition from Bárbara Soares (Filipa Areosa), Duarte's girlfriend, she will also have to deal with Toni, who, without her knowing it, was one of the arsonists in the pine forest, and Matias, who will not be able to continue to hide his feelings and will fight with his brother for the same woman.

=== 2nd phase ===
Six months later, another villain appears in the story.

Nuno Saavedra (António Pedro Cerdeira) lost his wife on the day of the fire and blames Nazaré and Toni for the tragedy. This man kidnaps Nazaré and Toni, drugs them and locks them up in a car in the pine forest. The objective is to set them on fire so that they can be burned to death, like his wife, but Duarte arrives in time to save them.

Nazaré is arrested for the murder of António and almost dies in prison twice, at the behest of Verónica. But someone relieves her with the video of António's death, proving that it was Félix who killed António. It is later revealed that it was Ismael (Tiago Aldeia) who allegedly killed Félix, having been in an accident. However, it is also revealed that there were two shots and that it was someone else who killed Félix and not Ishmael.

Duarte marries Barbara and is under house arrest, suspected of Félix's death. Meanwhile, Bárbara deceives Duarte, saying that she is pregnant, so that he does not leave her to be with Nazaré and tries to take advantage of Cris's addiction (João Maneira) to get pregnant. When Duarte realizes that he has been deceived, and with his heart still beating for Nazaré, he asks for a divorce and expels his wife from home. Maddened, she swears revenge.

Barbara, masked, abducts Nazaré. She runs away and discovers that Cláudia (Liliana Santos) is not dead, after all, but in an induced coma, and saves her friend who reveals that it was Barbara who killed Félix. Nazaré tells Duarte the whole truth about Barbara and he ends up questioning whether he is with Toni again, which she denies, ending up telling him that he never stopped loving her. The two make up, but the story is still far from the happy ending.

When all of Verónica's crimes are discovered, the villain is forced to flee and is saved by Nuno and, when he is on board a yacht, the man throws Verónica into a wooden boat and leaves her on the high seas to die.

Duarte and Toni propose to Nazaré at the same time, and the fisherwoman is undecided, but chooses Duarte and tells everyone that she accepted Duarte's marriage proposal.

After everyone learns that it was Barbara who killed Félix, the villain is trapped and, in the middle of Duarte and Nazaré's marriage, tries to take the fisherwoman's life. The police appear at that moment and take her to jail, where the villain will remain until the end of her days. At the time of goodbye, Barbara declares to her ex-husband. With the arrest of Bárbara, the singer is considered innocent by the death of Félix and leaves the jail for the arms of Glória.

During the wedding of Duarte and Nazaré, Toni appears by surprise at the ceremony and tries to convince the fisherwoman to stay with him, while getting emotional. Nazaré is undecided, but she still chooses Duarte to spend the rest of her life.

The first season ends with the couple in church celebrating the bond.

== Cast ==
Actor/Actress	Characters	Phases	
Actor/Actress	Characters	1	2
Carolina Loureiro	Nazaré Maria Dos Santos Gomes Blanco	Main Protagonist	Main Protagonist
José Mata	Duarte Tavares Blanco	Protagonist	Protagonist
Afonso Pimentel	António «Toni» Augusto Silva	Protagonist	Protagonist
Albano Jerónimo	Félix Blanco	Antagonist	Guest
Sandra Barata Belo	Verónica Andrade Telles Blanco	Antagonist	Antagonist
Filipa Areosa	Bárbara Soares Blanco	Co-Antagonist	Antagonist
Rogério Samora	Joaquim Gomes/Carlos Sampaio	Co-Protagonist	Co-Protagonist
Custódia Gallego	Matilde Gomes	Co-Protagonist	Co-Protagonist
Inês Castel-Branco	Laura Vaz	Regular	Regular
Rui Unas	Heitor Carvalho	Regular	Regular
Ruy de Carvalho	Floriano Marques	Regular	Regular
Márcia Breia	Ermelinda Marques	Regular	Regular
Carlos Areia	João Pereira	Regular	Regular
Luísa Cruz	Glória Silva	Regular	Regular
Gonçalo Diniz	Gonçalo Vaz	Regular	Regular
Carla Andrino	Dolores Soares	Regular	Regular
Bárbara Norton de Matos	Sofia Carvalho	Regular	Regular
Pedro Sousa	Matias Alexandre Silva	Regular	Regular
Tiago Aldeia	Ismael Pinto	Regular	Regular
Joana Aguiar	Érica Andrade Telles Blanco	Regular	Regular
Guilherme Moura	Bernando Maria Andrade Telles Blanco	Regular	Regular
Madalena Aragão	Carolina «Carol» Carvalho	Regular	Regular
João Maneira	Cristiano «Cris» Vaz	Regular	Regular
Laura Dutra	Ana Vaz	Regular	Regular
Raquel Sampaio	Olívia Carla Dias Pereira	Regular	Regular
Filipe Matos	Luís Soares	Regular	Regular
João Diogo Ferreira	Pipo Carvalho	Regular	Regular
Liliana Santos	Cláudia Fontes	Regular	Guest
Grace Mendes	Isabel d'Aires	Absent	Regular
António Pedro Cerdeira	Nuno Saavedra	Absent	Guest
Aurea	Patrícia Finote	Guest	Absent
Martinho Silva	Rogério Castro	Guest	Absent
Virgílio Castelo	António Blanco	Guest	Absent
Gonçalo Oliveira	Tiago Castro	Guest	Absent
