= Ilha =

Ilha (Portuguese for "island") may refer to the following places in Portugal or Mozambique:

- Ilha (Santana), a parish in the municipality of Santana, Madeira
- Ilha (Pombal), a former parish in the municipality of Pombal
- Island of Mozambique, an island and populated place of the coast of mainland Mozambique
