= Castle of Pombal =

Medieval castle in Pombal, Portugal

- Castelo de Pombal
- Leiria, Pinhal Litoral, Centro in Portugal
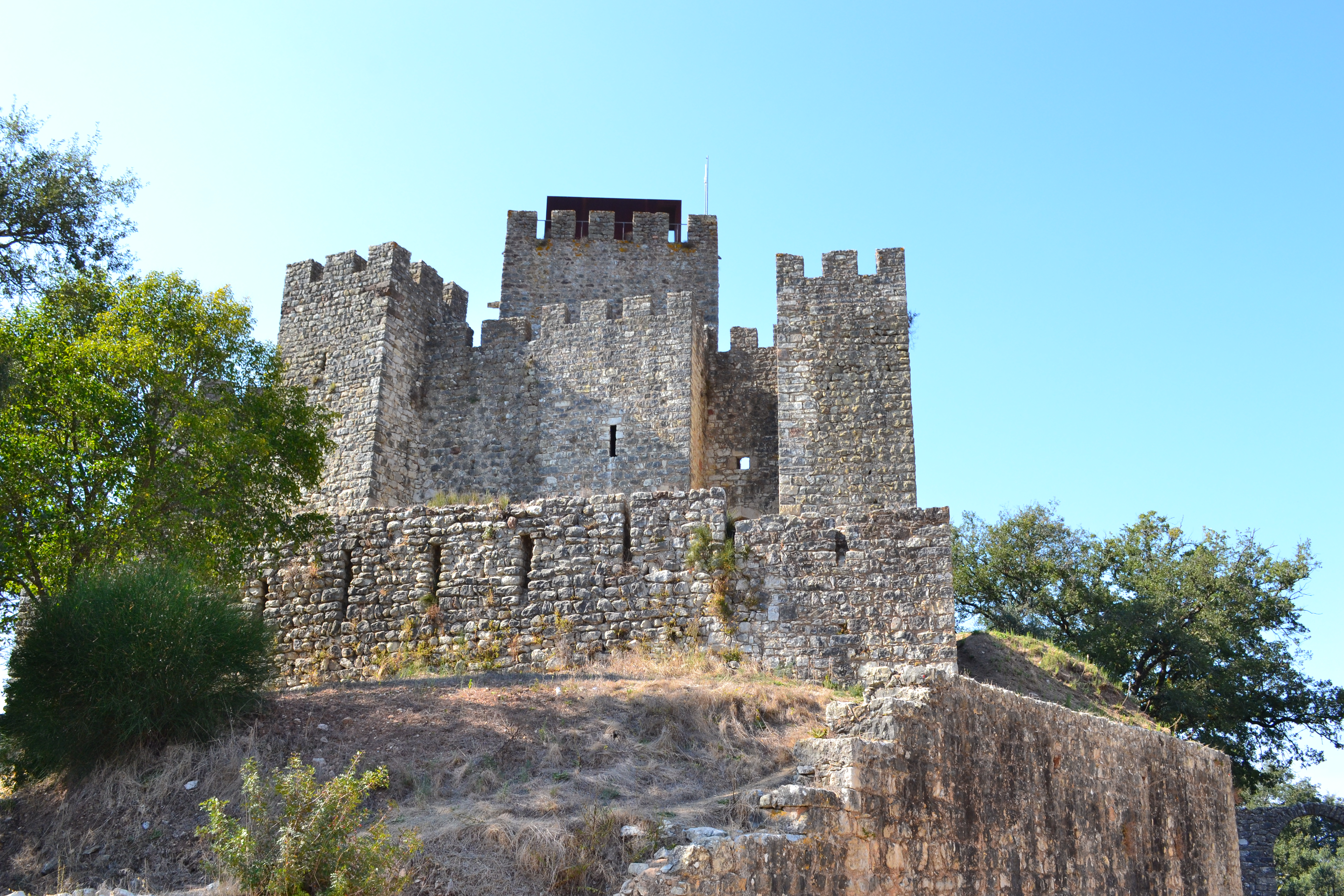
- The walls and keep of the Castle of Pombal, as seen from below the hill

Site information
- Type: Castle
- Owner: Portuguese Republic
- Operator: Câmara Municipal de Pombal
- Open to the public: Public

Location
- Coordinates: 39°54′50.14″N 8°37′29.05″W

Site history
- Built: c. 1128
- Materials: Stonework, Masonry, Concrete, Steel

The Castle of Pombal (Portuguese: Castelo de Pombal) is a medieval castle in the civil parish of Pombal, municipality of the same name in the district of Leiria in the Centre region of Portugal.

== History ==
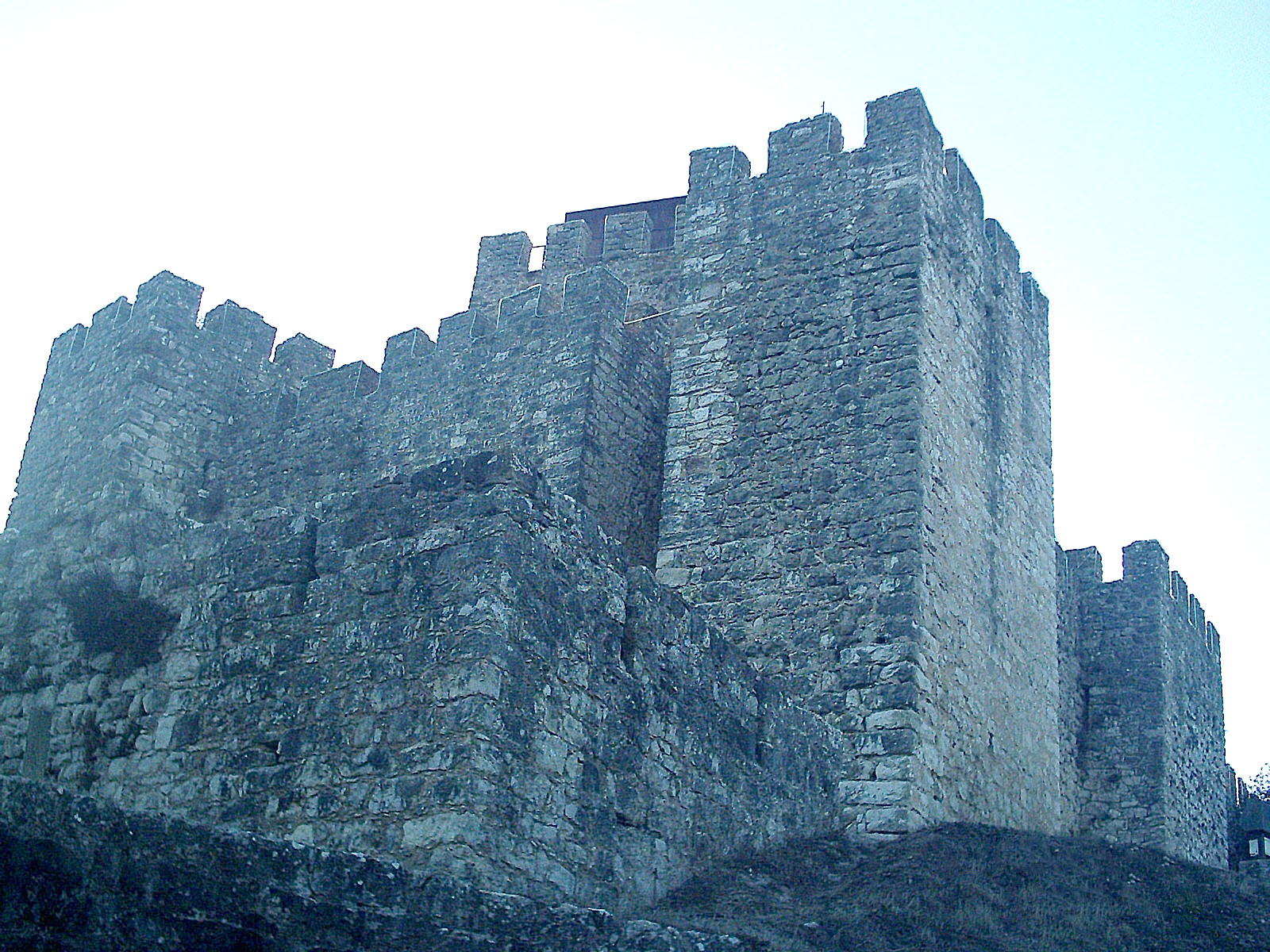
Detail of the exterior walls showing the crenellations

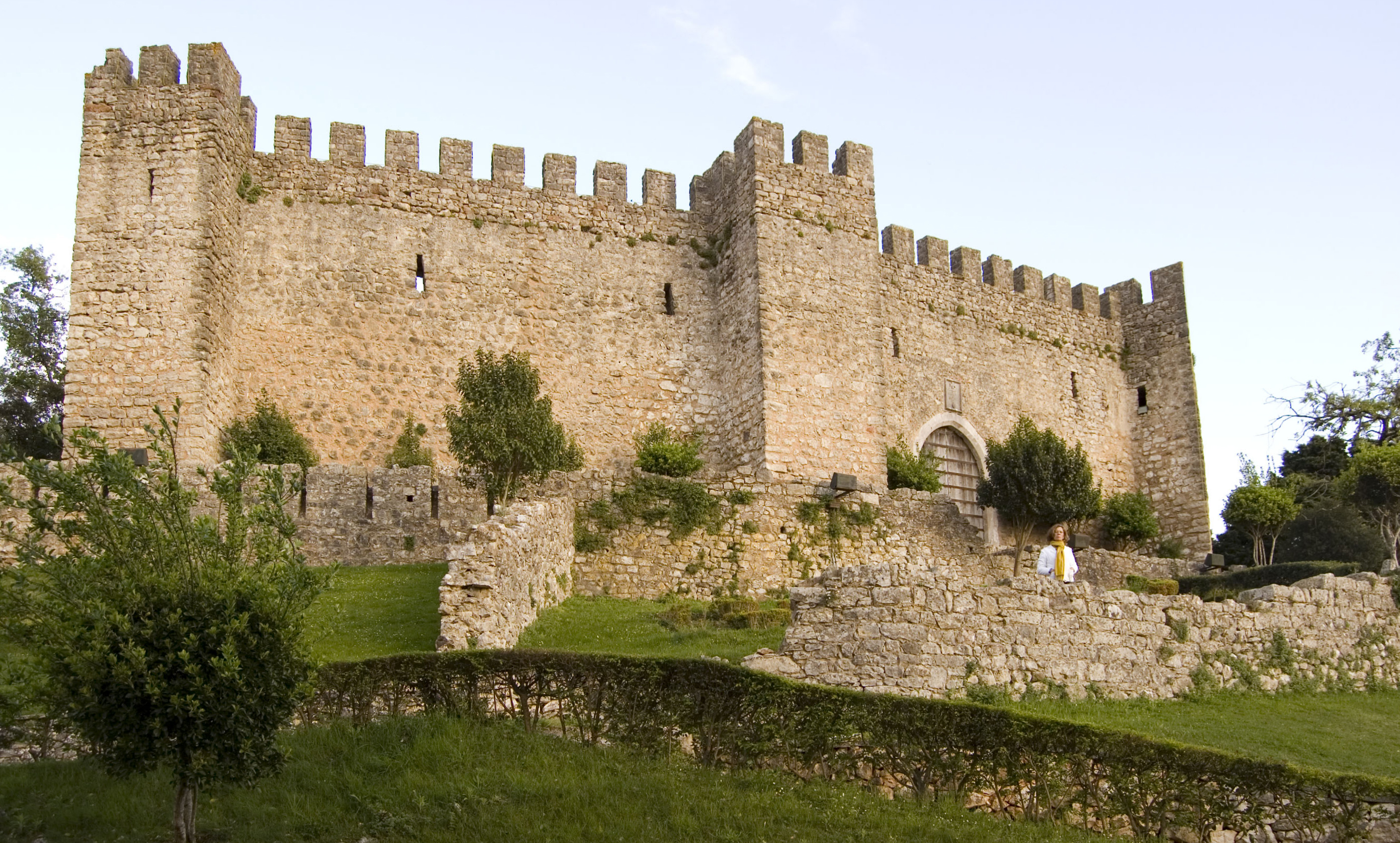
Outside the exterior walls on the sloping terrace are a second series of walls

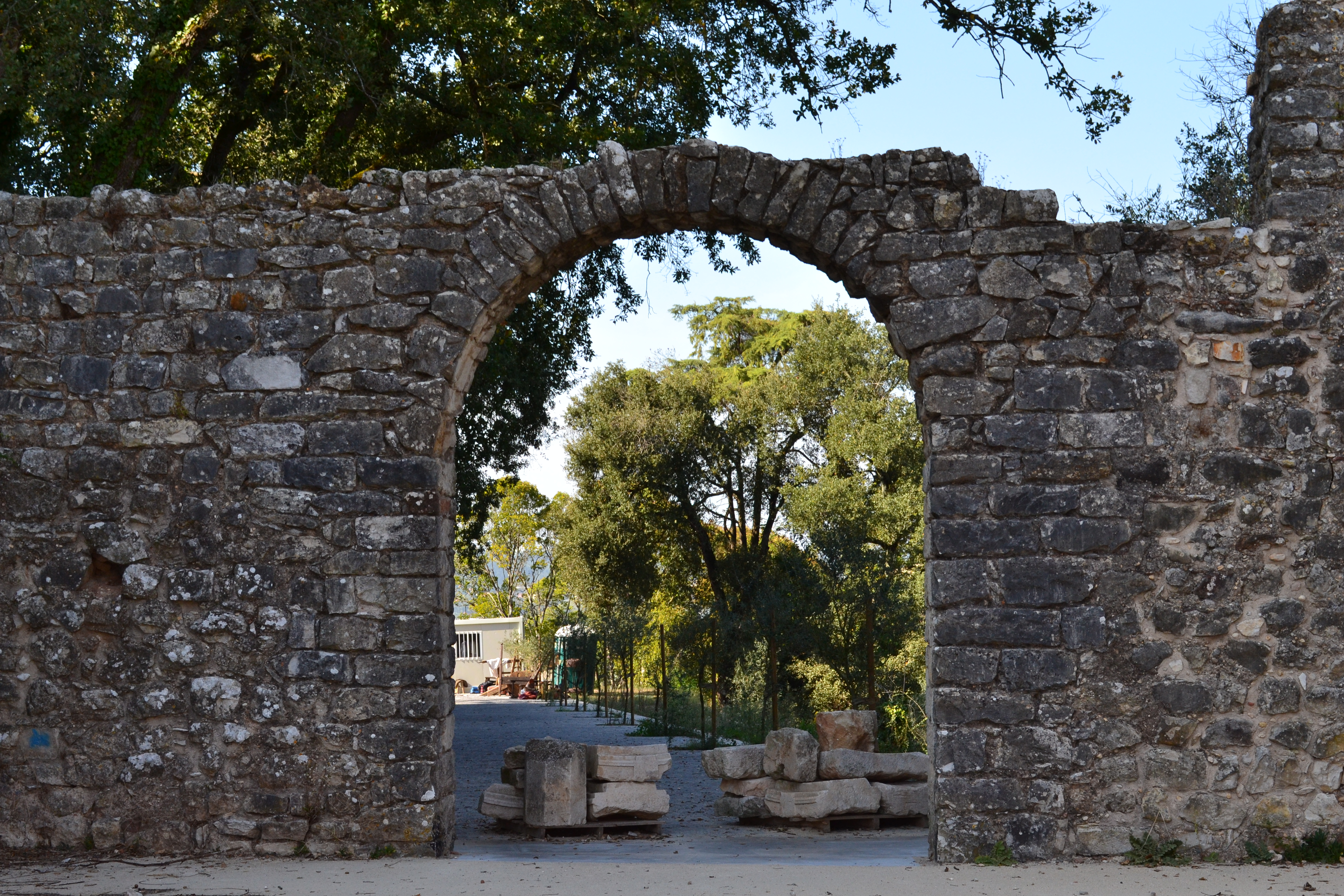
The southeast gate to the Castle of Pombal, seen from the interior

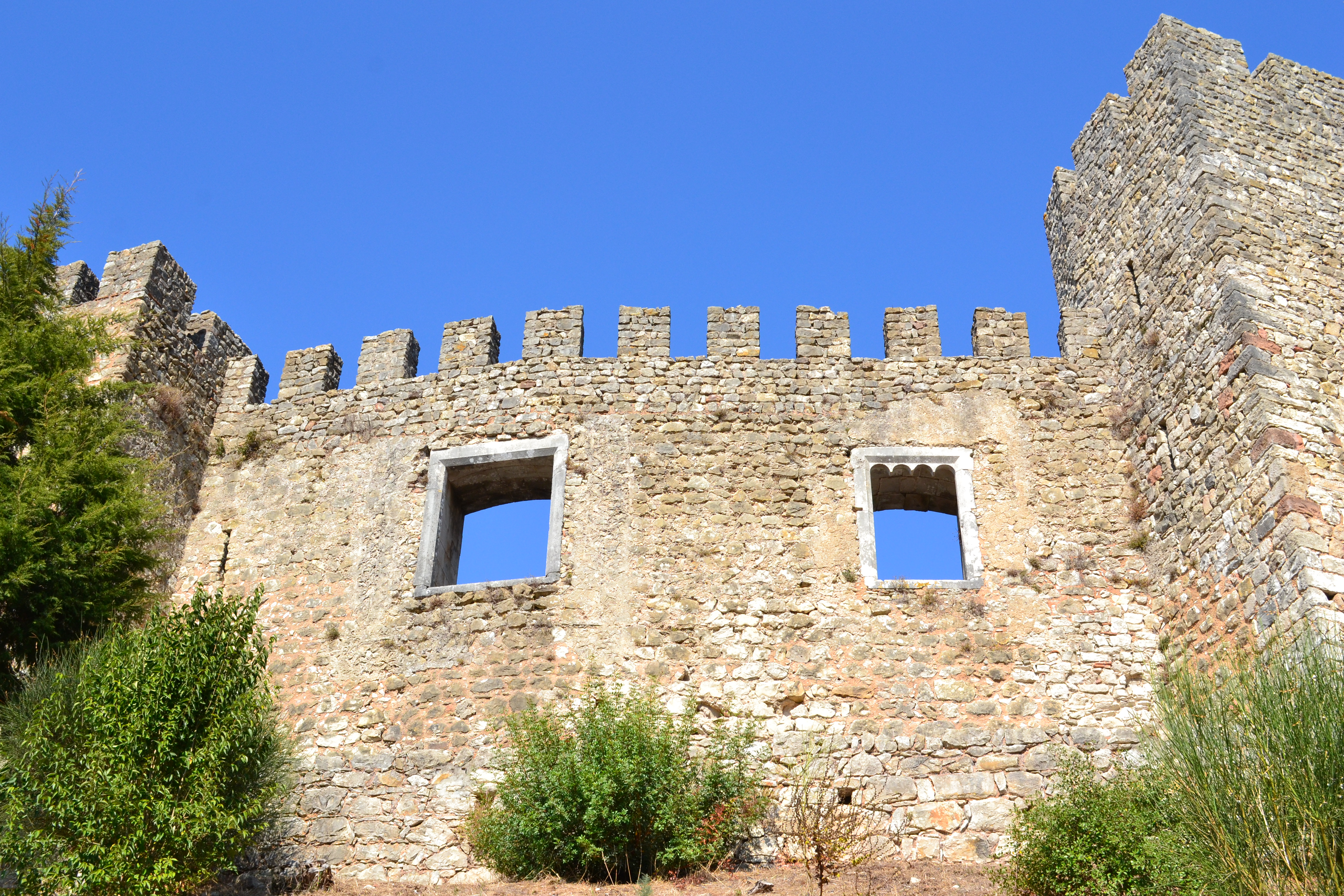
From outside the walls, two of the rectangular windows common to the late history of the castle

Around 1128, the Castle of Pombal, which was originally a former Roman castro and Arab fortress, was donated to the Knights Templar by Afonso Henriques in order to defend Coimbra and which included a vast territory of land. The transfer of its control during that period, was seen as an important military position, owing to its successive generations of fortification and disputes between Christian and Muslim forces.

The construction of the Romanesque fortress began in the middle of the 12th century (in either 1155 or 1156), and continued practically until the century's end; the construction of various towers was made to serve, stabilize and reinforce the wall, and help to repopulate the town. It is likely that work started on the encirclement of the position and later to the construction of the keep (around 1171), and includes an alambor, a defensive feature to mitigate attacks close to the walls.

In 1171, the keep was constructed in the castle courtyard; during this period of the passive Reconquista, the keep served as the last defensive bastion, acting as the Lord lieutenants personal stronghold. At the conclusion of the project an inscription was carved over the door to the keep, something promoted by D. Gualdim Pais in the medieval period, while in 1353, the castle and village were donated to the Order of Christ. The plaque was later removed and deposited in the Convent of Christ in Tomar Municipality, on request of Prince Henry the Navigator (between 1420 and 1460).

Little changed during the early Middle Ages to the Romanesque fortification, and only re-thinking of its battlements were identified in the reign of Manuel I of Portugal, which included the definition of the barbican and reinforcement of the medieval walls.

A similar reconstruction of the Church of Santa Maria do Castelo began in 1560, under the alcalde Pedro de Sousa Ribeiro, an antecedent of the Count of Castelo-Melhor, who held the governorship since the reign of Afonso V until 1834.

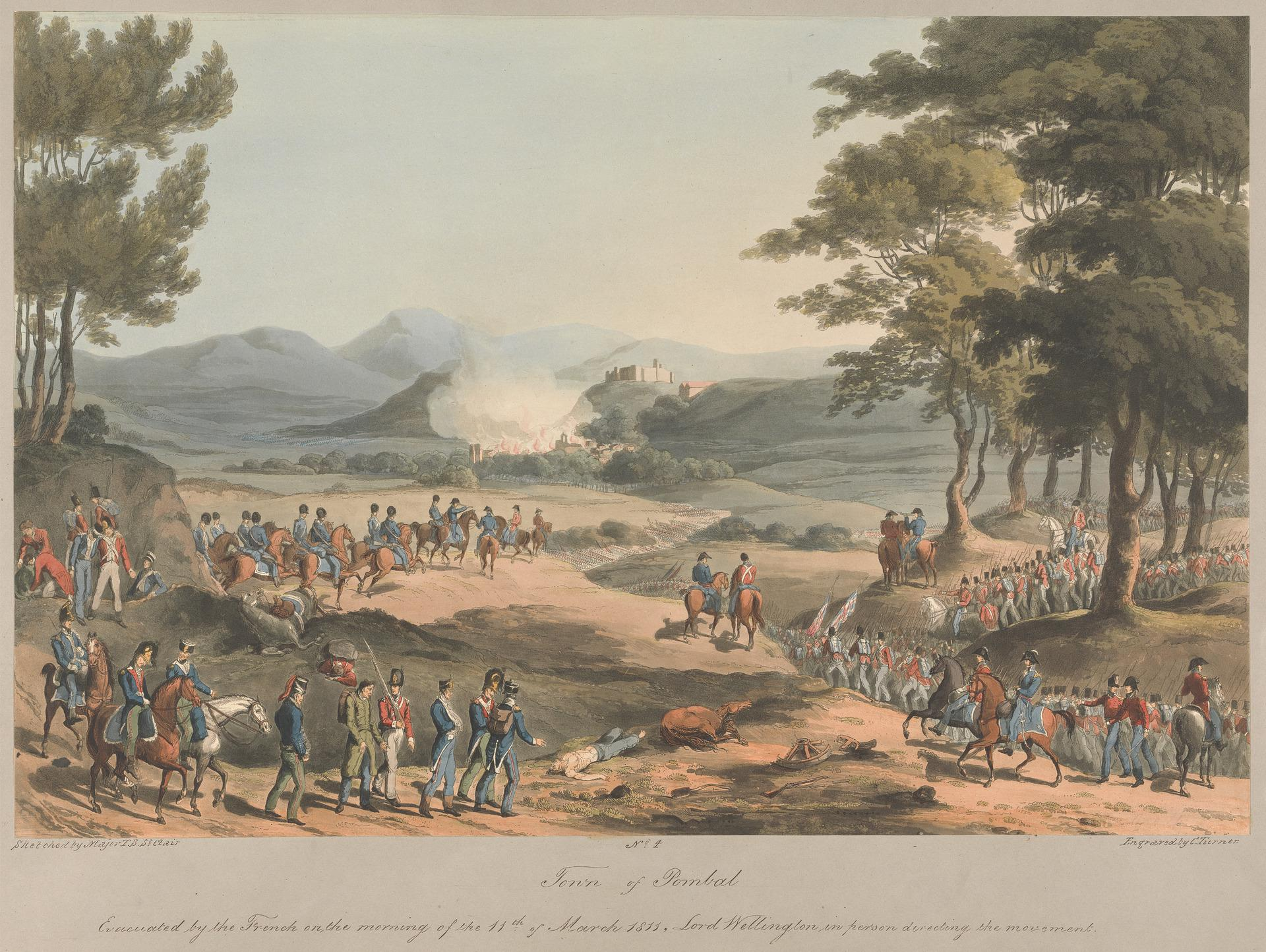
The Town of Pombal. Evacuated by the French on the Morning of 11 March 1811

The castle lost its military importance during the modern era, and was attacked by French forces during the Napoleonic Peninsular War. French troops commanded by General Ney caused sevre damage to the castle during the peninsular invasion in 1811. The following year, the baptismal fountain was transferred from the Church of Santa Maria do Castelo to the Church of São Martinho. Although partially restored in the 20th century, most of the settlement began to concentrate along the flanks of the hilltop or lowlands.

In 1923, a formal request was sent by the Municipal Council of Pombal to the Ministry of War (Portuguese: Ministério da Guerra) soliciting the transfer of the Castle to their authority. The following year, on 7 December 1924, the castle was given by the same ministry to the Núcleo da União dos Amigos dos Monumentos da Ordem de Cristo em Pombal do Castelo. The transfer included land in the village and ancillary terrains, that constituted Military Camp No.1: "in the municipal square the transfer of the ruins of the castle to the Núcleo, demarcated by 32 stone markers, numbered successively from the north to south, from the east, and numbered with the abbreviations M.G....To the Núcleo went the responsibility to conserve and guard the property, with the assistance of the Ministry of War, when necessary; the concession and title was free, with indefinite time limit, while property remained in the hands of the Ministry; the Núcleo was forbidden to perform whatsoever remodelling, even recuperations that involved demolish or new constructions in masonry, or movements of land in the esplanades, without a written license from the Ministry of War". This contract persisted until 1931, when the Núcleu was dissolved: the concession was transferred to the Comissão de Iniciativa e Turismo de Pombal (Pombal Commission for Initiatives and Turismo).

In the years preceding the Portuguese World Exposition in 1940, there were several initiatives to restore or recuperate the site. In 1933, a request to construction a roadway to connect the Castle to Pombal, which was authorized and registered by the Ministry of War. A similar request was sent to the Ministry in 1934, that proposed the planting of trees and landscaping, which was approved by the executive commission of the Municipal Council and authorized by the Conselho Superior de Belas Artes.

In 1936, the stone masonry was repaired and the walls were reconstructed to match those that existed. Similarly, in 1937, more repairs were completed on the walls, including the corners, chemin de ronde, parapets in the southern facade; reconstruction of the stoneworks, chemin de ronde, vaulted arches on the southern and western facade; construction of the roof frame in the keep; construction of pavements and staircase, between the floors of the keep; replacement of the exterior gates; and excavations in the military square. This continued into 1938 with the reconstruction of walls to a state comparable to its original construction; the complete reconstruction of the southern barbican, including the consolidation of the crenelations, battlements and staircases to better resemble its original state.

On 13 April 1939, the Castle was transferred to the Ministry of Finances (Portuguese: Ministério das Finanças). By the time of its transfer, the castle was in a state of ruin, and included an ancillary terrain, covering 25,537 square metres (274,880 ft^{2}), at the time equivalent to 200.000$00escudos. The castle included walls and barbicans, as well as the main tower/keep, marked by a public road to the north.

The site was only electrified in 1956. "Festive" lighting was installed in 1959 by the Serviços dos Monumentos Nacionais (National Monument Services), in collaboration with the Municipal Council.

The exterior and interior walls were cleaned in 1970, with cement reinforcement of the chemin de ronde, reinforcement of the joints and repairs to the main gate. Likewise, around 1975, the pavement and coverings in the keep were redone, including access stairs; repairs to the second-floor staircase and the construction of a protective covering; the second and third-floors were re-tiled; while the main floor and main gate were cleaned and repaired.

Around 2000-2001, the keep was reassessed with repairs undertaken. In 2004, the Municipal Council of Pombal presented a project to requalify and revalorize the Castle and its grounds, which at the time was being studied by the IPPAR Instituto Português do Património Arquitectónico (Portuguese Institute for Architectural Patrimony). Comparably, in 2005, the main keep was converted into a museum. In November, of the same year, a risk assessment for the castle was undertaken by the DGEMN Direcção Geral dos Edifícios e Monumentos Nacionais (General-Directorate for Buildings and National Monuments).

== Architecture ==
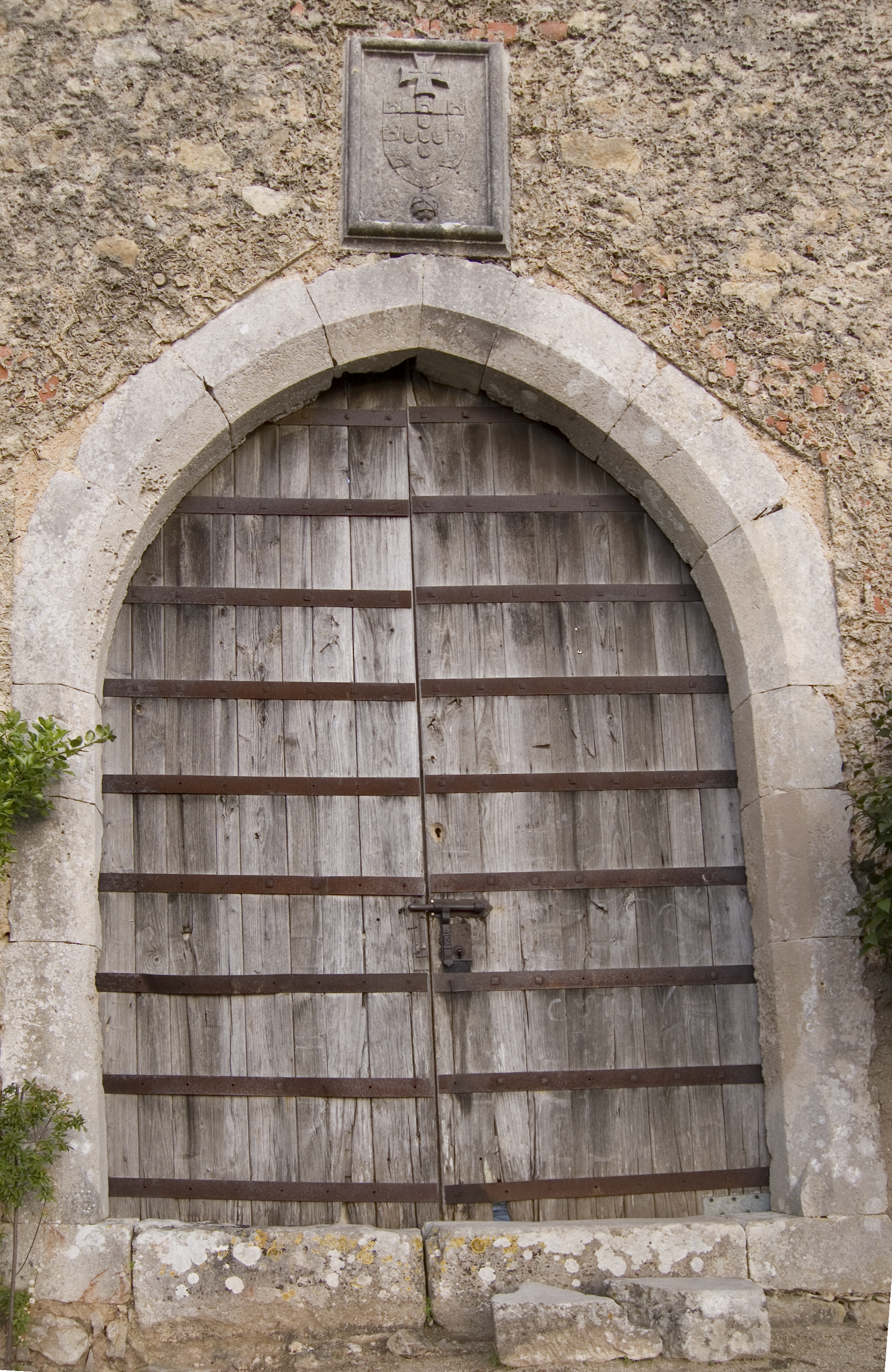
The large gate located in the northwest of the castle with royal coat-of-arms, armillary sphere and cross

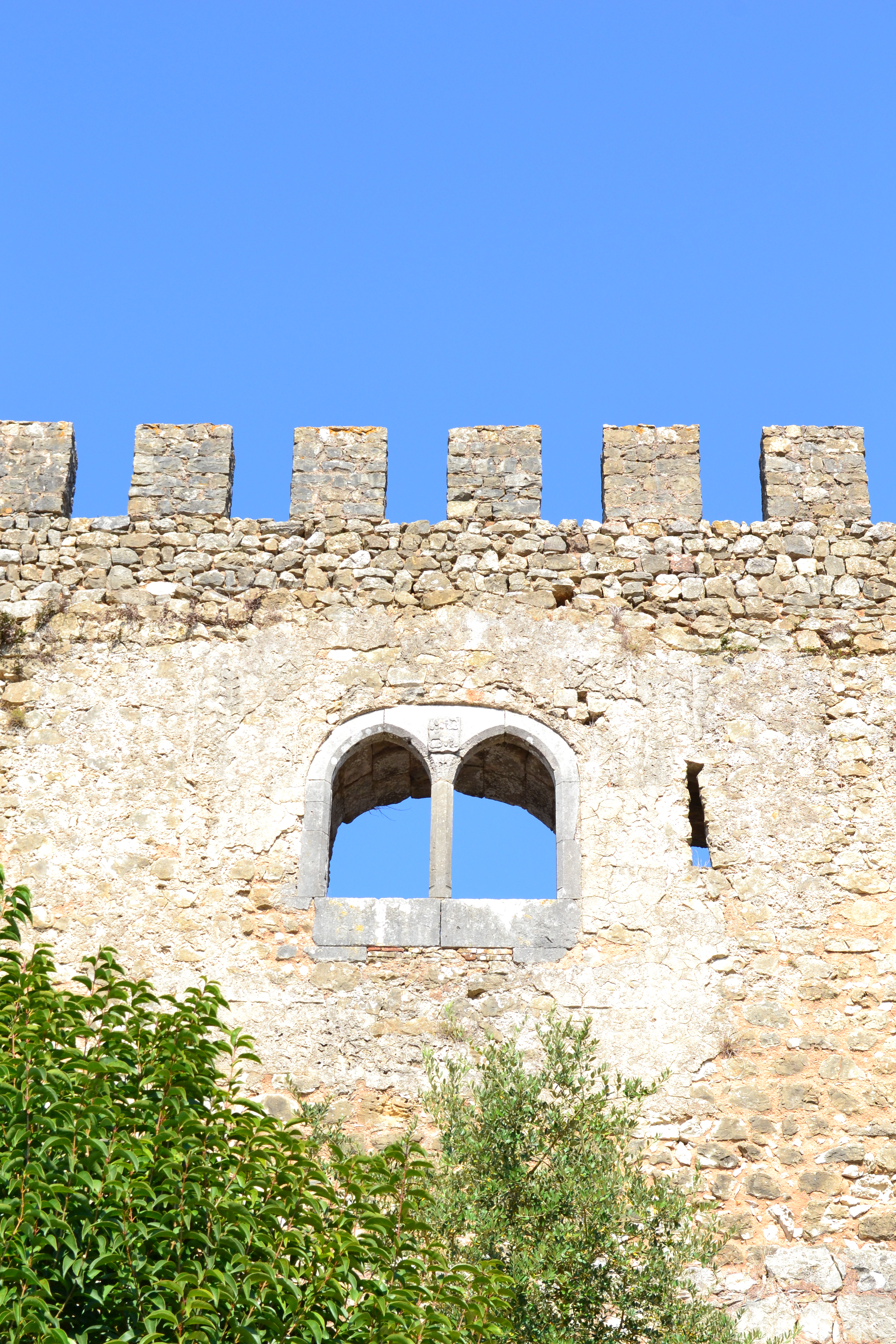
The double-window with carved coat of arms for the Sousa Ribeiro

The rural castle is located on an elevated hilltop overlooking the town of Pombal, on the right margin of the River Arunca. Alongside its accessway is also located the town's main cemetery.

The structure, in the form of a shield, is encircled by walls and chemin de ronde, broken by prismatic merlons and reinforced at its vertices and regular intervals by rectangular turrets. The principal wall is broken by two arched doors: one to the southeast between towers, and another larger door to the northwest, surmounted by a royal coat-of-arms, between armillary sphere and Christian cross.

Carved on the left-side of the ashlar wall, of the tunnel entrance is an eroded inscription carved into rock, with decorated frame. Approximately 50 × 66 centimetres (20 × 26 in), and sculpted in a square 20th century typeface, the plaque reads: A HISTÓRIA DESTE CASTELO FOI RECORDADA COM GRATIDÃO PELOS PORTUGUESES DE 1940 (The History of the Castle was Recorded with Gratitude by the Portuguese of 1940). A comparable inscription is found on the right-side of the southeast ashlar wall entrance, consisting of a semi-eroded plaque 31 × 105 centimetres (12 × 41 in), with the words: PATRIMÓNIO DO ESTADO. PRAÇA DE ARMAS (Patrimony of the State. Military Square).

The keep tower is a rectangular two-storey structure above a sloping base, close to the southeast gate. This dungeon was later transformed into an exhibition hall for the castle. In the castle courtyard are the visible foundations of other dependencies, as well as the holes of the cistern.

A limestone inscription to the Templars is recorded on a slab to the right side along the wall of one of the ruined buildings, with no frame or decoration. Consisting of a 49.5 × 79.5 × 5 centimetres (19.5 × 31.3 × 2.0 in) slab, the 20th century inscription reads: COMEMORAÇÃO DO DIA DA COMENDADORIA DE COIMBRA, RAINHA SANTA ISABEL Aos quatro dias do mês de Julho do Ano da Graça de dois mil e quatro, nesta mui nobre cidade de Pombal, na presença do seu Grão Mestre Sua Alteza Eminentíssima Don Fernando Pinto de Sousa Fontes e Grã Prioresa de Portugal Sua Alteza Sereníssima Dona Maria da Glória Pinto de Sousa Fontes, com o Alto Patrocínio do Excelentíssimo Senhor Engenheiro Narciso Ferreira Mota, Presidente da Câmara Municipal de Pombal, os actuais templários recordam e homenageiam os seus ancestrais (Commemorating the Day of the Commandeering of Coimbra, Queen [Saint] Elizabeth. The fourth day of July in the Year of Grace, two thousand and four, in this very noble city of Pombal, in the presence of Grand Master, His Most Eminent Highness D. Fernando Pinto de Sousa Fontes and Grand Prioress of Portugal His Serene Highness D.Maria da Gloria Pinto de Sousa Fontes, under the High Patronage of His Excellency Engineer Ferreira Narciso Mota, Mayor of Pombal, the current Templar remember and honor their ancestors). Some historians suggest that this inscription was actually from the Castle of Almourol and not Pombal. A recent study of the inscription, by Mário Barroca, points to the probability, owing to the font-type, technique and organization, that the inscription showed similarities to those of the Almoural Castle.

Along the southwest wall, is a double window, with which is a sculpted stone coat-of-arms of the Sousa Ribeiro clan, historical alcaldes of the castle. In front of the southeast gate, to the northwest, are the vestiges of the barbican.

Outside the exterior walls, on a lower terrace on the mountain-top, are the ruins of a second series of walls, with three rectangular towers and a chapel of the Church of Santa Maria do Castelo. The chapel is dressed in square stone, decorated in the Renaissance-style of the period. Observable in one the fragments of the grave-stones of the chapel is the 35-×-75-×-17-metre (115 × 246 × 56 ft) limestone inscription dedicating the grave to Sebastião de Almeida. Of the Renaissance retables originally located in the Church, produced by João de Ruão and Jácome de Bruges, one was relocated to the Church of São Martinho, while another to the Church of the Cardal.

An inscription commemorating the institution of an heir engraved on a stone slab bordered by a polygonal fillet, etched in shallow grooves, showing signs of erosion. Use a font-type common to the 19th century, the 66 × 65.5 × 12 centimetres (26.0 × 25.8 × 4.7 in) inscription reads: ESTA QUINTA FOI INSTITUÍDA EM MORGADO NO ANO DE 1551 PELLO VALEROSO CAPITÃO JORGE BOTELHO CAVALEIRO FIDALGO NATURAL DA VILA DE POMBAL E A TOMOU EM SUA 3ª(=TERÇA) COMO CONSTA DO SEU TESTAMENTO: ESTA MEMÓRIA MANDOU FAZER SEU UNDÉCIMO ADMINISTRADOR JORGE COELHO DE VASCONCELOS BOTELHO E SOUSA CAPITÃO MOR DA DITA VILA NO ANO DE 1818 (This Quinta was instituted in the year 1551, by the valorous Captain Jorge Botelho, Faithful Knight and Natural of the town of Pombal, from his testament: This memorial was ordered built by the eleventh Administrator Jorge Coelho de Vasconcelas Botelho e Soura, Captain-major of the said town in 1818).

== See also ==
- Knights Templar in Portugal
