= Pombal =

Pombal may refer to:

== People ==
- Marquess of Pombal, a title
  - Sebastião José de Carvalho e Melo, 1st Marquess of Pombal, an 18th-century Portuguese statesman, Master of the Kingdom (1750–1777)

== Places ==
=== Brazil ===
- Pombal, Paraíba, a city in the State of Paraíba

=== Portugal ===
- Pombal, Portugal, a municipality in the district of Leiria
  - Pombal (parish), a civil parish in the municipality of Pombal
- Pombal (Alfândega da Fé), a civil parish of the municipality of Alfândega da Fé
- Pombal (Carrazeda de Ansiães), a civil parish of the municipality of Carrazeda de Ansiães
