= Almagreira =

Almagreira may refer to the following places in Portugal:

- Almagreira (Pombal)
- Almagreira (Vila do Porto)
