= Albergaria dos Doze =

- Civil parish
- Location in Portugal
- Coordinates: 39°47′57″N 8°34′55″W
- Country: Portugal
- Region: Centro
- Intermunic. comm.: Região de Leiria
- District: Leiria
- Municipality: Pombal
- Disbanded: 28 January 2013

Area
  - Total: 22.84 km^{2} (8.82 sq mi)

Population (2011)
  - Total: 1,765
  - Density: 77/km^{2} (200/sq mi)
- Time zone: UTC+00:00 (WET)
  - Summer (DST): UTC+01:00 (WEST)

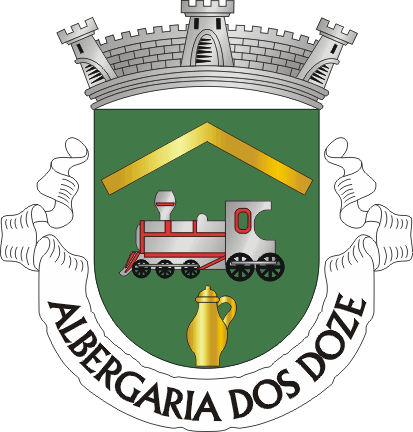

Albergaria dos Doze is a former civil parish in the municipality of Pombal, Portugal. In 2013, the parish merged into the new parish Santiago e São Simão de Litém e Albergaria dos Doze. The population in 2011 was 1,765, in an area of 22.84 km².
