= Sílvio Nascimento =

Angolan actor

- Born: Sílvio Nascimento; 11 November 1987 (age 38); Lubango, Angola
- Occupations: Actor, director, producer
- Years active: 2008–present

Silvio Emerson de Sousa Ferreira do Nascimento (born 11 November 1987), popularly known as Sílvio Nascimento, is an Angolan actor and producer. He is best known for the roles in the television serials Windeck and Jikulumessu as well as films, Njinga: Queen of Angola and Blood Lines.

== Personal life ==
He was born on 11 November 1987 in Lubango, southern Huila province, Angola.

== Career ==
Nascimento started his career with theater at the age of seven when he performed in the school play “Sé Catedral”. At 18, he joined the theater group "Os Vozes Soltas". He continued his activities at the Luanda national ballet, in 2006. In 2008, he joined the group "Henrique Artes", and worked in “Hotel Komarka”. Then he visited several countries such as Cape Verde, Brazil, Portugal, Mozambique, South Africa and the United States of America to learn acting. In the same year, he made his film debut with Reduced to Nothing directed by Jack Caleia and Divua António. In 2009, he acted in the film Assaltos em Luanda 2, and the TV program Conversas no Quinta. In 2010, he joined with the weekly TV program on the fight against HIV discrimination Stop SIDA in which he continued for two years as the main face of the program. This made his breakthrough in drama and television among the Angolan public.

In 2011, he won the “Festlip” award for best CPLP group as a member of Henrique Artes. Then in 2012, he won the National Prize for Culture and Arts in Angola. In 2013 he acted in the serial Njinga Rainha de Angola and played the role "Kasa Cangola". For the role, he won his first international film prize in Jakarta. In 2014 and 2015, he nominated for the "Moda Luanda" trophies in the category of Best Actor of Angola. Later he received the distinction of best actor by TV ZAP in the Zap News Program. In 2015 and 2016, he joined the telenovela Jikulumessu, with the character Paulo Almeida. For this role, he won the Seoul International AWARDS award in the category of best drama series.

In the meantime, Nascimento received the title of Ambassador of Angolan Youth Culture in the USA. Prior to that, he had two nominations for “Emmys International TV Festival” for the soap operas Windeck in 2014 and Jikulumessu in 2015. In 2017, he won the Luanda Fashion Award for the Best Actor. In 2018, he won the award for the Golden Globe Angola for Best Actor. In 2021, he signed an agreement with RTP-Africa to exhibit the Tellas digital platform that show films and other content of the seventh art by Angolan, Cape Verdean, Mozambican, Bissau-Guinean and Sao Tome directors. In the same year, he represented Angola at the "Berlinale" - 71st Berlin Film Festival, in Germany.

== Filmography ==
Year	Film	Role	Genre	Ref.
2013	Nzinga, Queen of Angola	Jaga Kasa Cangola	Film	
2014	Jikulumessu	Paulo	TV series	
2014	Njinga, Rainha de Angola	Jaga Kasa Cangola	TV series	
2016	Amor Maior	Augusto	TV series	
2017	Paixão	Jacob	TV series	
2018	Linhas de Sangue	Baltazar	Film	
2018	Falso Perfil	executive producer, Zé Luís	Film	
2019	Teorias da Conspiração	Romeu	TV series	
2019	Vidas Opostas	Chico Guedes	TV series	
2020	A Rede	Aristófanes Macambuzio	TV series	
2021	Até Que a Vida Nos Separe	Segurança	TV series	
2021	O Clube	Fernando Pedrosa	TV series	
2021	After Party	Mumuila	TV series	
2021	2 Duros de Roer		Film	
TBD	Um Novo Amor	Pedro Quaresma	Film	
