= Guia =

Guia may refer to:

- Guia (Albufeira), a parish in the municipality of Albufeira, Portugal
- Guia (Pombal), a parish in the municipality of Pombal, Portugal
- Guia Hill, one of the seven hills of Macau
  - Guia Fortress, a historical military fort, chapel, and lighthouse complex in the former Portuguese colony of Macau
  - Guia Circuit, a temporary race track in the streets of Macau, named after Guia Hill
    - Guia Race of Macau, an annual international touring car race held on the circuit

== See also ==
- Teve Guía, a Puerto Rican gossip and listings magazine
- Guía de Isora, a municipality in the province of Santa Cruz de Tenerife, Canary Islands
- Guia lighthouse (Cascais) a lighthouse on the outskirts of the Portuguese town of Cascais
- Santa María de Guía de Gran Canaria, commonly known as Guía, a municipality on Grand Canary island, Canary Islands
- Flor de Guía cheese, a cheese made in the Canary Islands
- Nuestra Señora de Guía, a Catholic image in the Philippines.
