= São Simão de Litém =

- Civil parish
- Location in Portugal
- Coordinates: 39°50′00″N 8°36′44″W
- Country: Portugal
- Region: Centro
- Intermunic. comm.: Região de Leiria
- District: Leiria
- Municipality: Pombal
- Disbanded: 28 January 2013

Area
  - Total: 16.03 km^{2} (6.19 sq mi)

Population (2011)
  - Total: 1,382
  - Density: 86/km^{2} (220/sq mi)
- Time zone: UTC+00:00 (WET)
  - Summer (DST): UTC+01:00 (WEST)

São Simão de Litém is a former civil parish in the municipality of Pombal, Portugal. In 2013, the parish merged into the new parish Santiago e São Simão de Litém e Albergaria dos Doze. The population in 2011 was 1,382, in an area of 16.03 km².
