= Nazaré season 2 =

Nazaré
- Season 2
- Starring: Carolina Loureiro; José Mata; Afonso Pimentel; Tiago Teotónio Pereira
- No. of episodes: 126

Release
- Original network: SIC
- Original release: July 12, 2020 – January 8, 2021

Season chronology
- ← Previous; Season 1

The second and last season of Nazaré began airing on SIC on July 12, 2020 and ended on January 8, 2021.

== Plot ==
A year has passed since the wedding of Nazaré (Carolina Loureiro) and Duarte (José Mata). And this is how the second season of the soap opera begins.

The love between them is stronger than ever and the manager even dreams of having children, making plans with his beloved, more reluctant to have lost a baby in the past.

Professional life is also going well. While he successfully takes care of Atlantis, Nazaré creates his own frozen fish company, Geliré, Congelados da Nazaré. But the harmony between the couple will not last much longer with the arrival of Rui Tavares (Tiago Teotónio Pereira) in the city.

This is Duarte's younger brother, whom he did not know, as his mother, Natália Tavares (Manuela Couto), fled her pregnant home to escape an unhappy and suffering marriage.

The return of Natália and Rui, who comes with her, promises to further deeply shake Duarte who, at the beginning, suffers an accident at sea and causes him some changes in mood.

Rui and Duarte don't understand each other and while Rui is calm and serene, Duarte is just the opposite, but everything changes when the veterinarian, Blanco's youngest profession, realizes that he is completely in love with his sister-in-law.

The vet and surfer is tired of trying to have a good relationship with his brother and decides to fight for Nazaré, promising with all his strength.

And while Nazaré gets a new lover, her husband starts having his brother as his biggest rival, now that Toni (Afonso Pimentel) has fallen in love with another girl and is expecting a child.

Toni ends up falling in love with Vânia Costa (Mikaela Lupu), Sónia's older sister (Catarina Bonnachi). Divorced, the young woman left her career as a journalist to become manager of Barbatanas, Glória's restaurant (Luísa Cruz), the mother of the fishmonger who lives happily beside Ismael (Tiago Aldeia).

Toni, with her usual lip service, conquers Vânia's heart, which makes her pregnant. When the 2nd season action begins, she is in her eighth month of pregnancy.

Happy, Toni does not want his girlfriend to make any effort not to harm the “little boy”, which is what he calls the son who is about to be born.

In addition to this exaggerated protectionism, there are two other things that make Vânia very confused. One is to be pregnant without having an engagement ring, the other is ... Nazaré! She doesn't understand why Toni still calls her old girlfriend "bae".

It is not just the personal part that Nazaré has turned inside out again. As a businesswoman, the path you have to travel is also arduous.

Geliré becomes a successful factory that the old fisherwoman manages with an iron fist and a lot of effort, but in creating it she makes a new enemy: Adolfo Frisado (Miguel Costa).

Until now, he was the owner and lord of the region's frozen foods, managing the biggest and most profitable company in Nazaré, however, the arrival of the beautiful brunette to the market causes the heir of Frisado to lose customers and a lot of money to his rival.

A man of few scruples, he will try to do everything to end the Nazaré factory and the discussions will take place between them, with Adolfo entering Geliré to confront the new manager in the first episodes.

However, Nazaré barely met Alice Moreira (Margarida Serrano), a girl who lost her parents and is being raised by her grandfather, a former fisherman with several health problems, and has already been enchanted by her.

In fact, it reveals itself in its way of being pesky, untimely and full of energy. Alice adores her too, looking at her as her idol. Josué Moreira's granddaughter (Joel Branco) becomes the home of Nazaré and Duarte, who are concerned about the girl's future.

Josué has taken care of the girl since her parents died in an accident when she was a baby. His health problems make him unsure about his granddaughter's future.

At some point, Alice will live with Nazaré and Duarte due to Josué's health problems, but in the short term, because as soon as her grandfather can recover she returns to him, becoming his legal tutors.

Júlia Neves (Oceana Basílio), married to Roberto Neves (Fernando Nobre), the accountant of Cortez's criminal organization, arrives in Nazaré. Julia lives at the expense of her husband, but everything will change when Roberto disappears without a trace. After the disappearance of her husband, Roberto, Júlia became involved with Nuno (António Pedro Cerdeira), until the deceased returned ... He was shot, but now that he is well, he wants to recover what is his. And that's where a less sweet and capable Julia of everything comes in.

Amelia Marques (Rita Lello) is also the one who comes to recover what she believes to be hers and avenge her sister's death. The successful lawyer and always on the path to justice, makes a detour to make life miserable for her brother-in-law, Nuno, who hates and always wanted to see far from Joana. She believes he was the one responsible for the death of Joana, otherwise he would not have been involved with Verónica (Sandra Barata Belo). Promises not to rest until you taste it. Putting him in prison is his goal, as is recovering part of the family farm that his brother-in-law inherited from his wife.

== Cast ==
Actor/Actress	Characters
Carolina Loureiro	Nazaré Maria dos Santos Gomes Blanco
José Mata	Duarte Tavares Blanco
Afonso Pimentel	António «Toni» Augusto Silva
Tiago Teotónio Pereira	Rui Tavares Blanco
Rogério Samora	Joaquim Gomes
Custódia Gallego	Matilde dos Santos Gomes
Manuela Couto	Natália Tavares Blanco
Rita Lello	Amélia Marques
Miguel Costa	Adolfo Frisado
Oceana Basílio	Júlia Neves
António Pedro Cerdeira	Nuno Saavedra
Ruy de Carvalho	Floriano Marques
Márcia Breia	Ermelinda Marques
Carlos Areia	João Pereira
Luísa Cruz	Glória Silva
Joel Branco	Josué Moreira
Carla Andrino	Dolores Soares
Tiago Aldeia	Ismael Pinto
Mikaela Lupu	Vânia Costa
Guilherme Moura	Bernardo Maria Andrade Telles Blanco
Raquel Sampaio	Olívia Carla Dias Pereira
Igor Regalla	Gilberto «Gil» Fragoso
Joana Aguiar	Érica Andrade Telles Blanco
João Maneira	Cristiano «Cris» Vaz
Laura Dutra	Ana Vaz
Catarina Bonnachi	Sónia Costa
Margarida Serrano	Alice Moreira

=== Guest ===
Actor/Actress	Characters
Sandra Barata Belo	Verónica Andrade Telles Blanco
Fernando Nobre	Roberto Neves
