= Carolina Loureiro =

Portuguese actress

- Born: Carolina Silva Loureiro; 23 June 1992 (age 34); Mata Mourisca, Pombal, Portugal
- Occupations: Actress; Presenter; Model
- Known for: Nazaré

Carolina Loureiro (born in Pombal, Mata Mourisca, on 23 June 1992) is a Portuguese actress, model and presenter, best known for playing Nazaré Gomes in SIC's soap opera Nazaré.

== Biography ==
Carolina Loureiro lived until the age of 17 in the parish of Guia, Pombal.

At the age of 17, she made her debut in the series "Morangos com Açúcar", playing the character Sara Reis, in 2011. In 2013, still on TVI, she joined the main cast of the soap opera Mundo ao Contrário. In 2014, she joined the cast of the soap opera O Beijo do Escorpião, also on TVI, as participation.

In 2015, she starred in the SIC Radical series Aposta Que Amas and currently plays "Nazaré Gomes" in the SIC soap opera Nazaré as the protagonist.

She was the presenter of SIC's Fama Show between 2016 and 2020.

=== Personal life ===
She dated singer David Carreira from 2015 to 2017, having starred in his music video "Primeira Dama", "In Love", "Não Foi Eu" and "Diz Que É Só Comigo". She is currently dating Brazilian singer Vitor Kley.

== Filmography ==
=== Television ===
Year	Title	Character	Channel	Paper
2011—2012	Morangos com Açúcar	Sara Reis	TVI	Main cast
2013	Mundo Ao Contrário	Maria Jardim Malta	TVI	Antagonist
2014	O Beijo do Escorpião	Natacha	TVI	Antagonist
2015	Aposta que Amas	Matilde	SIC Radical	Protagonist
2016—2020	Fama Show	Ela mesma	SIC	Presenter
2019—2021	Nazaré	Nazaré Gomes Blanco	SIC	Protagonist
2020—2022	A Máscara	Ela mesma	SIC	sworn
2020	Domingão	Ela mesma	SIC	Presenter
2021	Estamos em Casa	Ela mesma	SIC	Presenter
2021	A Lista	Patrícia	OPTO/SIC	Participação especial
2022	Lua de Mel	Nazaré Gomes Blanco	SIC	Protagonist
