= 1987 Carriço shooting =

Mass shooting in Portugal

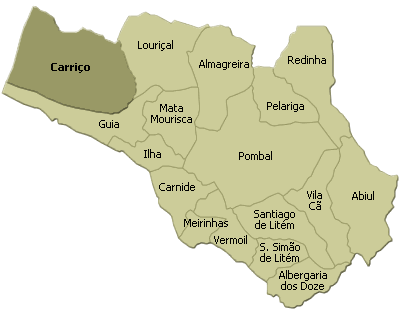
- Location: Carriço, Portugal
- Date: March 1, 1987
- Attack type: Femicide, mass murder, mass shooting, stabbing
- Weapons: Shotgun; Pistol; Knife
- Deaths: 7
- Injuries: 1
- Perpetrator: Vítor Jorge

Vítor Jorge (November 2, 1949 – Corsica, January 5, 2019), known as "Mata-sete" (Seven Killer), was a Portuguese mass murderer who killed seven people and attempted to kill one more. His victims were killed with blows from clubs, knives, and gunshots; among them were his wife, daughter, and lover. Investigators believe the crime had religious and misogynistic motives.

The case was called the Osso da Baleia Beach Massacre because some of the murders occurred on the beach of the same name. Vítor Jorge was sentenced to the maximum penalty at the time, 20 years, however he only served 14 due to good behavior and was then released.

== Biography ==
Vítor Jorge was born on November 2, 1949. After his birth, he was abandoned by his parents and raised by his grandparents. At age 5, he witnessed his uncle drowning his two baby daughters. At age 8, his mother took him in, and Vítor went to live in Lisbon. His mother was a prostitute, and since there was only one room, Vítor was forced to watch the sexual acts she performed with clients. Years later, as an adult, Vítor physically assaulted his mother after she brought a man home, accusing her of undermining their relationship.

He met his wife, Carminda, in 1968 and they had three children, two daughters and a son. According to neighbors' testimonies, Carminda was a victim of domestic violence, and Vítor had several mistresses, one of whom was Leonor dos Santos Tomás, one of his future victims. Professionally, Vítor was a banker at Banco Espírito Santo e Comercial de Lisboa and part-time a wedding and christening photographer.

== Crimes ==
On March 1, 1987, Vítor Jorge murdered 7 people, one by beating them with a stick, two by stabbing them, and four others by shooting them. Among the victims were his wife, eldest daughter, and 5 young people between the ages of 17 and 24. He even tried to murder his middle daughter.

=== Massacre at Osso da Baleia Beach ===
One of Vítor's lovers, Leonor dos Santos Tomás (24 years old), and 4 of her friends - Luís Teixeira (17), Maria do Céu Araújo (20), Isabel Moreia (21) and José Pacheco (22) - had celebrated Leonor's birthday the day before. After the festivities, in the early hours of the following day, the young people went to a local train station, hitching a ride with Vítor Jorge, who had been hired to photograph the party. However, he convinced them to go to Osso da Baleia Beach.

When they arrived at the beach, Vítor took out a shotgun and shot José, killing him first, as he was from the Portuguese Armed Forces and therefore could stand up to him. Then, he shot and killed Leonor, Luís, and Maria, in that order. Isabel, the last member of the group, manages to escape momentarily, but in a panic she couldn't remain silent, and Vítor Jorge followed her by the sound and beat her to death with a piece of pine wood. Later, the police found a note next to Leonor's body that read: "This was because you wanted it. The others were dragged along."

=== Family Crime ===
After massacring the five young people on Osso da Baleia Beach, the criminal goes to his house, where the massacre began. From his own family. First, he took his wife (36 years old) to a pine forest, under the pretext that she had run over a man and needed help, and stabbed her five times in the back. Then, he took his eldest daughter, Anabela (16), who suffered the same fate. Finally, he took his middle daughter, Sandra (14), but she saw the bodies of her mother and sister and fought with her father in an attempt to grab the knife, eventually escaping. The youngest son, 10 years old, was sleeping at home during the entire incident.

Sandra, wounded from the fight with her father, went to call for help. A man who was passing by in a car took her in and called the National Republican Guard. The search for the fleeing mass murderer begins, only ending two days later when a former neighbor of Vítor Jorge finds him hiding in a ruined shack. He was arrested and taken to the hospital because he had a fever and a leg injury.

== Diary ==
Vítor Jorge kept a diary where he wrote mainly about his afflictions and criminal fantasies.

In his diary, Vítor Jorge planned various types of massacres, from destroying the Braço de Prata war material factory to planting explosive devices in nightclubs. He also wrote a murder-suicide plan, which included a list of 12 people he wanted to kill. Of those, he only managed to kill two: his lover and his daughter. Vítor Jorge even tried to predict the headlines newspapers would give to his crimes: "Disjointed messages and madness cause great tragedy," "Desperate man, after murdering several people, ends his life," and "Insanity causes horrific crimes."

A common theme in the diary was the blaming of women; he said they lived only for carnal pleasure, luxury, and ostentation. He accused his mother of being unfaithful and forcing him to watch her prostitution, his wife of not marrying as a virgin, and his daughter Anabela of dating an older man who already had a child. He justified the murder of his family with the following pretext: "I kill my wife because she wasn't a virgin when she got married, I kill my daughters so they won't be prey to the pleasures of the world."

== Trial and Conviction ==
Vítor Jorge was subjected to numerous psychiatric examinations, tests, and evaluations to ascertain his guilt; there were differing opinions regarding Vítor Jorge's mental state. On one hand, Eduardo Cortesão, director of the Miguel Bombarda Hospital, argued that Vítor Jorge suffered from a "serious mental illness," while newspapers claimed it was schizophrenia. On the other hand, psychiatrist Guilherme Wilson stated that psychotic symptoms were not present, only some minor personality changes. The latter won the debate, and therefore Vítor Jorge could be found guilty of his crimes.

The trial began on December 15th in Leiria, with a jury of eight people, presided over by Judge Gregório Simões. Vítor Jorge was defended by Mário Ferreira. On January 20, 1988, Vítor Jorge was sentenced to pay compensation of 1,350 Portuguese escudos to his two surviving children, should they claim it, and to a prison sentence of 17 years for each homicide, totaling 119 years. However, due to changes in the Portuguese Code of Criminal Procedure, which came into effect on January 1st, the maximum sentence was reduced from 25 to 20 years, and Vítor Jorge was sentenced to 20 years of effective imprisonment at the Coimbra Prison.

On October 3, 2001, Vítor Jorge was released on parole for good behavior, after serving 14 years and 6 months of his sentence. He moved to his son's house in England. Later, he emigrated to the French island of Corsica, where he died at the age of 69, after several suicide attempts.
