= Mata Mourisca =

- Civil parish
- Location in Portugal
- Coordinates: 39°56′56″N 8°45′11″W
- Country: Portugal
- Region: Centro
- Intermunic. comm.: Região de Leiria
- District: Leiria
- Municipality: Pombal
- Disbanded: 28 January 2013

Area
  - Total: 24.78 km^{2} (9.57 sq mi)

Population (2011)
  - Total: 1,835
  - Density: 74/km^{2} (190/sq mi)
- Time zone: UTC+00:00 (WET)
  - Summer (DST): UTC+01:00 (WEST)

Mata Mourisca is a former civil parish in the municipality of Pombal, Portugal. In 2013, the parish merged into the new parish Guia, Ilha e Mata Mourisca. The population in 2011 was 1,835, in an area of 24.78 km^{2}.
