= Miguel Hurst =

Angolan actor (born 1967)

- Born: Miguel João de Andrade Hurst; 6 June 1967 (age 59); Freiburg im Breisgau, Germany
- Occupations: Actor, director, producer
- Years active: 1993–present

Miguel João de Andrade Hurst (born 6 June 1967), popularly known as Miguel Hurst, is an Angolan actor and director of German and Portuguese descent. He is best known for the roles in the films Foreign Land, Le pacte du Silence and Filhos do Vento.

== Personal life ==
He was born on 6 June 1967 in Freiburgo, Germany and raised until nine years. From 1977 to 1979, he lived in Guinea Bissau and then moved to Lisbon, Portugal from 1979 to 2003. During that period, he studied at the Lisbon Theater and Film School and later founded the Pau Preto Theater Group in Lisbon. In 2003, he moved to Luanda, Angola and appointed as the director of the Angolan Institute of Audiovisual and Multimedia Cinema (IACAM).

== Career ==
In 1995, he joined the cast of Teatro Nacional D.Maria II-Lisboa. In 2007, he worked as a teacher in the discipline Introduction to Artistic Expressions at Universidade Independente, Luanda. Then from 2005 onwards, he worked on Theater History at the National Institute for Artistic Training for one year.

Between 2010 and 2016, he worked at the Goethe-Institut Angola (Instituto Cultural Alemao), where he later proposed a project to the director Christiane Schulte about documenting Angola's cinema culture. He was the artistic director at Semba Comunicação, acting in the television series Fora de Série. Later he joined with several soap operas such as Sede de Viver, O Comba, O Testamento and Minha Terra Minha Mãe. Meanwhile, in 2015, he released the book, Angola Cinemas, in collaboration with photographer Walter Fernandes.

As the founder, director and production director of the Pau Preto Theater Group, he producer several theater plays including; Os Condenados, Museu do Pau Preto, Cabral, Alimária, Idéia Karapinha, Quem, The Singing Turtle and Woza Albert.

== Filmography ==
Year	Film	Role	Genre	Ref.
1993	Encontros imperfeitos	António	Film	
1993	A Banqueira do Povo	António	TV series	
1994	Sozinhos em Casa	Ernesto	TV series	
1994	Um Sabor a Mel	Jimmy	TV series	
1994	Os Andrades	Rui	TV series	
1995	Foreign Land	Angolano 3	Film	
1997	Afro Lisboa		Film	
1997	Filhos do Vento	Arthur	TV series	
1997	Riscos	Zeca	TV series	
1998	Far from One's Eyes	Prisoner in Hospital	Film	
1998	Terra Mãe	Hugo	TV series	
1999	Jornalistas		TV series	
1999	Esquadra de Polícia		TV series	
1999	A Lenda da Garça	Guilherme	TV series	
2001	Jardins Proibidos	Adolfo	TV series	
2002	Super Pai	Doctor	TV series	
2003	Le pacte du silence	L'interne	Film	
2004	The Hero	Doctor Luís	Film	
2010	Regresso a Sizalinda	Adolfo	TV series	
2011	Voo Directo	Vitor	TV series	
2013	Njinga, Queen of Angola	Njali	Film	
2014	Jikulumessu	Walter Nambe	TV series	
2014	Njinga, Rainha de Angola	Njali	TV series	
2017	A Ilha dos Cães	Pedro Mbala	Film	
