= Nazaré (TV series) =

- Promotional poster/English poster for distribution
- Starring: Carolina Loureiro; José Mata; Afonso Pimentel; Tiago Teotónio Pereira (season 2)
- Country of origin: Portugal
- Original language: Portuguese
- No. of seasons: 2
- No. of episodes: 334 + 3 christmas special

Original release
- Network: SIC
- Release: September 9, 2019 – January 8, 2021

Related
- Alma e Coração; Amor Amor

Nazaré is a Portuguese telenovela which began airing on SIC on 9 September 2019 and ending on 8 January 2021.

== Plot ==
Nazaré is a force of nature. Young, determined, strong and willing to do almost anything to save her mother's life, which depends on an expensive surgery.

At the fisherman's village, blessed with the big waves, where Nazaré lives, she does some hard work to save up some money. Boyfriend and childhood sweetheart Toni is always there to back her up.

Wood industry mogul and owner of Atlantida, António Blanco, will discover his brother and business partner Félix is stealing money from the company. From confidence to complete distrust, António will order his brother to move out of his home and leave the business. But Félix and wife Verónica have a plan: they order a forest fire that will impact everyone's lives.

One love is forged by fire and one death will change everything.

Toni knows that the fire will happen. He was hired to set it. He also knows that the Blanco's house will be empty so he convinces Nazaré to come along with him to loot whatever they can, and she ends up being caught by surveillance cameras...

During the robbery, and in the middle of the fire, Nazare ends up saving Duarte's life, the spoiled playboy of the family, whom Felix wanted to kill along with his father, once he would (and will) inherit the company's presidency.

The closeness between Nazaré and Duarte will become the perfect motto for Felix to make Nazaré an offer she can't refuse: to befriend Duarte in exchange for her mother's treatments.

== Cast ==
Actor/Actress	Characters	Seasons		
Actor/Actress	Characters	1		2
Actor/Actress	Characters	1.1	1.2	2
Carolina Loureiro	Nazaré Gomes Blanco	Main Protagonist	Main Protagonist	Main Protagonist
José Mata	Duarte Tavares Blanco	Protagonist	Protagonist	Protagonist
Afonso Pimentel	António «Toni» Augusto Silva	Protagonist	Protagonist	Protagonist
Tiago Teotónio Pereira	Rui Tavares Blanco	Absent	Absent	Antagonist
Manuela Couto	Natália Tavares Blanco	Absent	Absent	Co-Protagonist
Sandra Barata Belo	Verónica Andrade Blanco	Antagonist	Antagonist	Guest
Albano Jerónimo	Félix Blanco	Antagonist	Guest	Absent
Filipa Areosa	Bárbara Soares Blanco	Co-Antagonist	Antagonist	Absent
Custódia Gallego	Matilde dos Santos Gomes	Regular	Regular	Regular
Rogério Samora	Joaquim Gomes/Carlos Sampaio	Regular	Regular	Regular
Carla Andrino	Dolores Soares Gomes	Regular	Regular	Regular
Joana Aguiar	Érica Andrade Blanco	Regular	Regular	Regular
Guilherme Moura	Bernardo Andrade Blanco	Regular	Regular	Regular
Raquel Sampaio	Olívia Pereira	Regular	Regular	Regular
Ruy de Carvalho	Floriano Marques	Regular	Regular	Regular
Márcia Breia	Ermelinda Marques	Regular	Regular	Regular
Carlos Areia	João Pereira	Regular	Regular	Regular
Luísa Cruz	Glória Silva	Regular	Regular	Regular
Tiago Aldeia	Ismael Pinto	Regular	Regular	Regular
João Maneira	Cristiano «Cris» Vaz	Regular	Regular	Regular
Laura Dutra	Ana Vaz	Regular	Regular	Regular
António Pedro Cerdeira	Nuno Saavedra	Absent	Guest	Regular
Oceana Basílio	Júlia Neves	Absent	Absent	Regular
Rita Lello	Amelia Marques	Absent	Absent	Regular
Miguel Costa	Adolfo Frisado	Absent	Absent	Regular
Catarina Bonnachi	Sónia Costa	Absent	Absent	Regular
Mikaela Lupu	Vânia Costa	Absent	Absent	Regular
Margarida Serrano	Alice Moreira	Absent	Absent	Regular
Joel Branco	Josué Moreira	Absent	Absent	Regular
Inês Castel-Branco	Laura Vaz	Regular	Regular	Absent
Gonçalo Diniz	Gonçalo Vaz	Regular	Regular	Absent
Rui Unas	Heitor Carvalho	Regular	Regular	Absent
Bárbara Norton de Matos	Sofia Carvalho	Regular	Regular	Absent
Pedro Sousa	Matias Alexandre Silva	Regular	Regular	Absent
Madalena Aragão	Carolina «Carol» Carvalho	Regular	Regular	Absent
João Diogo Ferreira	Pipo Carvalho	Regular	Regular	Absent
Filipe Matos	Luís Soares	Regular	Regular	Absent
Liliana Santos	Cláudia Fontes	Regular	Guest	Absent
Grace Mendes	Isabel d'Aires	Absent	Guest	Absent
Fernando Nobre	Roberto Neves	Absent	Absent	Guest
Aurea	Patrícia Finote	Guest	Absent	Absent
Martinho Silva	Rogério Castro	Guest	Absent	Absent
Gonçalo Oliveira	Tiago Castro	Guest	Absent	Absent
Virgílio Castelo	António Blanco	Guest	Absent	Absent

== Series overview ==
Phases	Episodes		Originally released	
Phases	Episodes		First released	Last released
1	211	96	September 9, 2019	January 24, 2020
1	211	115	January 27, 2020	July 5, 2020
2	126		July 13, 2020	January 8, 2021
