= Meirinhas =

- Civil parish
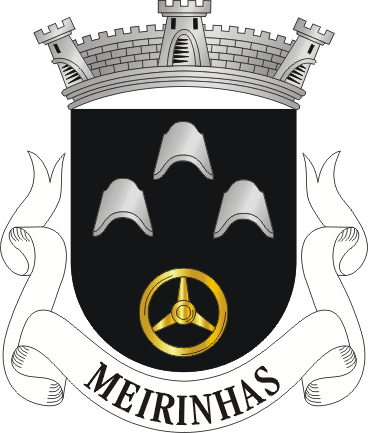
- Coat of arms

- Location in Portugal
- Coordinates: 39°50′44.93″N 8°42′36.51″W
- Country: Portugal
- Region: Centro
- Intermunic. comm.: Região de Leiria
- District: Leiria
- Municipality: Pombal

Area
  - Total: 8.88 km^{2} (3.43 sq mi)

Population (2021)
  - Total: 1,649
  - Density: 186/km^{2} (481/sq mi)
- Time zone: UTC+00:00 (WET)
  - Summer (DST): UTC+01:00 (WEST)
- Patron: San Francisco
- Website: https://jf-meirinhas.pt/ https://www.meirinhas.com/

Meirinhas is a civil parish in the municipality of Pombal, Portugal. The population in 2021 was 1,649, in an area of 8.88 km².

It was part of the parish of Vermoil until the creation of Meirinhas on December 31, 1984.

On 28 January 2026, Storm Kristin caused a catastrophic impact in Meirinhas with losses exceeding €500 million and nearly all homes and businesses suffering damage.

== Population ==
Population of the parish of Meirinhas

Year	Pop.	±%
1991	1,338	—
2001	1,732	+29.4%

Year	Pop.	±%
2011	1,775	+2.5%
2021	1,649	−7.1%
