= Carnide (Pombal) =

- Civil parish
- Location in Portugal
- Coordinates: 39°53′16″N 8°43′44″W
- Country: Portugal
- Region: Centro
- Intermunic. comm.: Região de Leiria
- District: Leiria
- Municipality: Pombal

Area
  - Total: 22.93 km^{2} (8.85 sq mi)

Population (2011)
  - Total: 1,647
  - Density: 72/km^{2} (190/sq mi)
- Time zone: UTC+00:00 (WET)
  - Summer (DST): UTC+01:00 (WEST)

Carnide is a civil parish in the municipality of Pombal, Portugal. The population in 2011 was 1,647, in an area of 22.93 km².
