= Grace Mendes =

Portuguese actress (born 1974)

- Born: 15 August 1974 (age 51); Lisbon, Portugal
- Occupation: Actress
- Years active: 2001–present

Grace Mendes (born 15 August 1974) is a Portuguese actress of Angolan background, famous for her performance as Sandra on the telenovela Ninguém como Tu. She is also well known for playing Marlene on Makemba Hotel, Rosa Bittencourt on Windeck, Nayr on Jikulumessu, and Yolanda on Maison Afrochic.

Mendes began acting at age 19, with her being part of the cast in theatre and TV productions. Her first role was in the telenovela Ganância, where she played the wife of the character Cardeal, played by Francisco Nicholson. She went on to play in various telenovelas afterwards in Angola and Portugal. In addition to acting, she has also done humanitarian work in Angola, such as with opening free health clinics in Luanda.

Mendes dated Angolan actor Fredy Costa from 2013 to 2020.

== Filmography ==
Year	Show	Role	Notes	Channel
2001	Ganância	Cardeal's wife (character interpreted by Francisco Nicholson)	Additional cast	SIC
2001	Danza Café	Herself	Dancer	RTP1
2003	Operação Triunfo	Herself	Juror	RTP1
2004	Morangos com Açúcar		Additional cast	TVI
2009	Makamba Hotel	Marlene	Additional cast	TV Zimbo
2013	Windeck	Rosa Bettencourt	Antagonist	TPA
2014–2015	Jikulumessu	Nayr Cange	Additional cast	TPA
2016	A Impostora		Additional cast	TVI
2017–2018	Maison Afrochic	Yolanda	Protagonist	Fox
2020	Nazaré	Isabel d’Aires	Special participation	SIC
