= Santiago e São Simão de Litém e Albergaria dos Doze =

- Civil parish
- Location in Portugal
- Coordinates: 39°49′22.58″N 8°36′53.39″W
- Country: Portugal
- Region: Centro
- Intermunic. comm.: Região de Leiria
- District: Leiria
- Municipality: Pombal

Area
  - Total: 69.89 km^{2} (26.98 sq mi)

Population (2011)
  - Total: 5,384
  - Density: 77/km^{2} (200/sq mi)
- Time zone: UTC+00:00 (WET)
  - Summer (DST): UTC+01:00 (WEST)

Santiago e São Simão de Litém e Albergaria dos Doze is a civil parish in the municipality of Pombal, Portugal. It was formed in 2013 by the merger of the former parishes Santiago de Litém, São Simão de Litém and Albergaria dos Doze. The population in 2011 was 5,384, in an area of 69.89 km^{2}.
