= Guia, Ilha e Mata Mourisca =

- Civil parish
- Location in Portugal
- Coordinates: 39.947°N 8.785°W
- Country: Portugal
- Region: Centro
- Intermunic. comm.: Região de Leiria
- District: Leiria
- Municipality: Pombal

Area
  - Total: 80.37 km^{2} (31.03 sq mi)

Population (2011)
  - Total: 6,489
  - Density: 81/km^{2} (210/sq mi)
- Time zone: UTC+00:00 (WET)
  - Summer (DST): UTC+01:00 (WEST)

Guia, Ilha e Mata Mourisca is a civil parish in the municipality of Pombal, Portugal. It was formed in 2013 by the merger of the former parishes Guia, Ilha and Mata Mourisca. The population in 2011 was 6,489, in an area of 80.37 km².
