= Tânia Burity =

Angolan actress and journalist (born 1978)

- Born: Tânia Cefira Gomes Burity; September 28, 1978 (age 47); Luanda, Angola
- Education: Instituto Médio de Economia de Luanda, Instituto Superior Privado de Angola
- Occupations: Actress, journalist, radio host, model
- Years active: 2001-present

Tânia Cefira Gomes Burity (born 28 September 1978) is an Angolan actress, journalist, radio host, and model.

== Biography ==
Burity was born in Luanda, Angola. She graduated with a degree in journalism from the Instituto Médio de Economia de Luanda (IMEL) and later studied communicationas at the Instituto Superior Privado de Angola. Burity worked in the sales and journalism fields until she reached the artistic world.

From 2001 to 2004, she was the host of the TV show Angola dá Sorte. In 2001, Burity starred in the TV series Vidas Ocultas. The following year, she played the student Djamila in Reviravolta. In 2005, Burity portrayed Cláudia, the protagonist of the soap opera Sede de Viver. From 2005 to 2006, she played Eugénia in the miniseries 113. Burity was the announcer and journalism editor for the radio show Boa Noite Angola from 2005 to 2006. In 2007, the actor Fredy Costa physically attacked Burity, causing her to not work for two months. Costa was sentenced to six months in prison, while his ex-wife Yola Araújo was acquitted.

In 2009, Burity played the businesswoman Camila in Minha Terra, Minha Mãe. Between 2010 and 2012, she served as the announcer and director of the children's radio program Karibrinca na Rádio. Burity has also worked as a runway model and was a presenter at Miss Luanda 2011. She portrayed the fashion advisor Ofélia in Windeck in 2012. in 2014, she was a host of Big Brother Angola. In 2016, Burity chaired the juries for Casting JC Models and Casting para Actores Agência Útima.

Her sister is the TV presenter Dicla Burity. Tânia Burity lives in Lisbon and has two daughters.

== Filmography ==
Year	Title	Role	Notes
2001	Vidas Ocultas		Special participant
2002	Reviravolta	Djamila	Special participant
2005	Sede de Viver	Cláudia	
2005-2005	113	Eugénia	
2007	Entre o Crime e a Paixão		
2009	Minha Terra, Minha Mãe	Camila	Antagonist
2012	Windeck	Ofélia Voss	Secondary antagonist
2014	Big Brother Angola	Special presenter	Participant
