= Helena Moreno (actress) =

Angolan actress

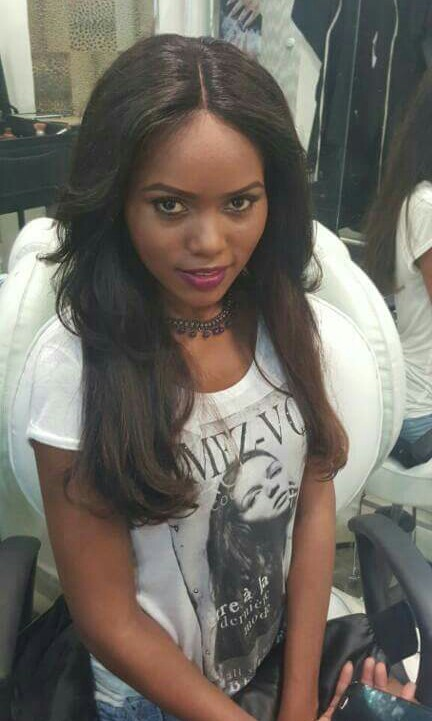
- Moreno in 2016
- Born: Angola
- Other names: Helen Morena
- Occupation(s): Actress, teacher
- Partner: Milton Miguel

Helena Moreno also known as Helena Morena, is an Angolan actress who has appeared in several Angolan telenovela series. Outside of entertainment, she has worked as a Portuguese language teacher.

== Career ==
Helena Moreno was born on 28 February 1989 in Luanda, Angola. Her family was poor, and her childhood home was a shack without windows in a shanty town. Despite this, she has stated that her childhood was happy.

Her first television appearance was in 2002, when she had a walk on part in the Angolan telenovela Revira Volta. She appeared again in a telenovela, but this time in an ongoing capacity as Weza Henriques Pereira in Sweet Pitanga. This led to radio work as a presenter for the show Bombástico. Further genre work followed, when in 2012 she was cast as Marisa Lemos in Windeck. She was honoured during a 2014 celebration of Angolan women, alongside Maria do Rosário Amadeu and Nadir Taty for working to improve Angolan culture in the arts.

Outside of entertainment, Moreno has also worked as teacher in the Portuguese language at an American school at both the primary and secondary levels.

== Personal life ==
Moreno announced in 2016 that she was pregnant with her boyfriend Milton Miguel, and at the baby shower in August, that she was expecting a boy. She said that the name of the child, Helton, was a portmanteau of Helena and Milton.
