= Eric Santos =

Angolan actor and writer

- Born: Eric Santos; January 31, 1972 (age 54); Luanda, Angola
- Occupations: Actor, writer
- Years active: 1996–present

Eric Santos (born 31 January 1972), is an Angolan-Portuguese actor and writer. He is best known for the roles in the films Scoundrel, The Compass, Jikulumessu and Kaminey.

== Career ==
Santos started his career in 1996 with the television serial Praça da Alegria. Since then he has participated in plays, films, series, and soap operas in both Angola and Portuguese.

He is the founder and CEO of 'Cast 39', a talent agency based in Portugal.

== Filmography ==
Year	Film	Role	Genre	Ref.
1998	Terra Mãe	Cliente do Periscópio	TV series	
1998	Os Lobos	Pereira	TV series	
1999	Le portrait	Eusébio	TV movie	
2001	Super Pai	Police Officer	TV series	
2001	Bastidores	Raúl	TV series	
2001	Nunca Digas Adeus	Sérgio	TV series	
2002	Fábrica de Anedotas	Delegado	TV series	
2002	Sociedade Anónima	Teacher	TV series	
2002	Bons Vizinhos	Tomás	TV series	
2002	A Jóia de África	Domingos Ferreira	TV series	
2003	I'm Staying!	Gilberto Garrincha	Film	
2003	Crimes en série	Barman	TV series	
2004	Uma Aventura	Edgar	TV series	
2005	Two Drifters	Álvaro Costa	Film	
2005	Inspector Max	Simão	TV series	
2006	O Bando dos Quatro	Mário	TV series	
2007	O Quinto Poder	Carlos	TV series	
2008	Casos da Vida	Francisco	TV series	
2008	A Outra	Jair Santos	TV series	
2008	The Compass	Eric	Film	
2009	Scoundrel	Ragos	Film	
2009	Sentimentos	Vilela	TV series	
2009	Acabou: Até te Esquecer	Eric Santos	Video short	
2010	Meu Amor	Inspector Matias	TV series	
2010	Regresso a Sizalinda	Rolha	TV series	
2010	Disquiet	Homem Negro no Bar	Film	
2010	Quero Ser Uma Estrela	António Jorge	Film	
2011	Voo Directo	Médico	TV series	
2011	Morangos com Açúcar	Sérgio	TV series	
2012	Windeck	Wilson Voss	TV series	
2012	Jorge	Ambrósio	TV movie	
2013	Dancin' Days		TV series	
2013	The Thorn of the Rose	Alberto Lunga	Film	
2013	Sol de Inverno	Raul	TV series	
2014	Jikulumessu	Ivo Kapala	TV series	
2014	I Love It	Arnaldo	TV series	
2015	A Única Mulher	Américo	TV series	
2015	Une famille formidable	Ambassadeur	TV series	
2016	Coração d'Ouro	Médico	TV series	
2016	Poderosas	Cúmplice José Maria	TV series	
2016	L'Araignée Rouge		TV series	
2017	Sim, Chef!	Bruno Falcão	TV series	
2018	Querida Preciosa	Papoite	TV series	
2018	Jogo Duplo	Zé Lenka	TV series	
2018	Alma e Coração	Saraiva	TV series	
2019	Valor da Vida	Enfermeiro	TV series	
2019	Golpe de Sorte	Francisco	TV series	
2019	South	Segurança Pastor	TV series	
2020	Na Corda Bamba	Padre	TV series	
2020	Ai a minha vida		TV series	
