= Almagreira (Pombal) =

- Civil parish
- Location in Portugal
- Coordinates: 39°59′34″N 8°39′44″W
- Country: Portugal
- Region: Centro
- Intermunic. comm.: Região de Leiria
- District: Leiria
- Municipality: Pombal

Area
  - Total: 43.18 km^{2} (16.67 sq mi)

Population (2011)
  - Total: 3,076
  - Density: 71/km^{2} (180/sq mi)
- Time zone: UTC+00:00 (WET)
  - Summer (DST): UTC+01:00 (WEST)

Almagreira is a civil parish in the municipality of Pombal, Portugal. The population in 2011 was 3,076, in an area of 43.18 km².
