= Mel Gambôa =

Romanian-Angolan actress, show host and producer

- Born: Melakrini Olavo Gamboa; 23 May 1984 (age 41); Bucharest, Romania
- Occupations: Actress, journalist, television producer

Mel Gambôa (born 23 May 1984) is a Romanian-Angolan actress, journalist, and television producer.

== Biography ==
Gambôa was born in 1984 in Bucharest, Romania. The daughter of an Angolan father and a Romanian mother, she began performing in the theater in 1998, joining the theater group Horizonte Nzinga Mbandi as an extracurricular activity. Between 2001 and 2003, Gambôa lived in Madrid and joined the theater group Los Sobrinos del Mago de Oz as an actress and assistant director of the children's plays "El Gnomo Jeromo" and "Los Evangelios Apócrifos" by Frank Huesca.

In 2004, she returned to Luanda and dedicated herself to the theater, participating in several workshops and taking courses in the performing arts. Gambôa joined the contemporary African dance and percussion company Manésema in 2006 as the group's public relations director and master of ceremonies. In 2007, she began her career in television. In 2010, Gambôa founded the multimedia company Together Now, which, in addition to providing photography and video services, created training programs for actors and the "Photography Angola" course.

Gambôa served as the presenter of the entertainment program Tchilar on Channel 2 of Public Television in Angola. In 2012, she began hosting the radio show called Show da Mel on Rádio Despertar 91.0 FM.

In 2017, Gambôa moved to Los Angeles to complete her education in cinema. Due to financial difficulties, she was forced to use social media to raise funding for herself.

Gambôa is a feminist activist and has opined that citizens are not able to know what is actually happening in Angolan politics. She practices tantra yoga and photography and has studied books on Buddhism.

== Filmography ==
- 2008: Viagens
- 2018: Prego (short film)
