= Jikulumessu =

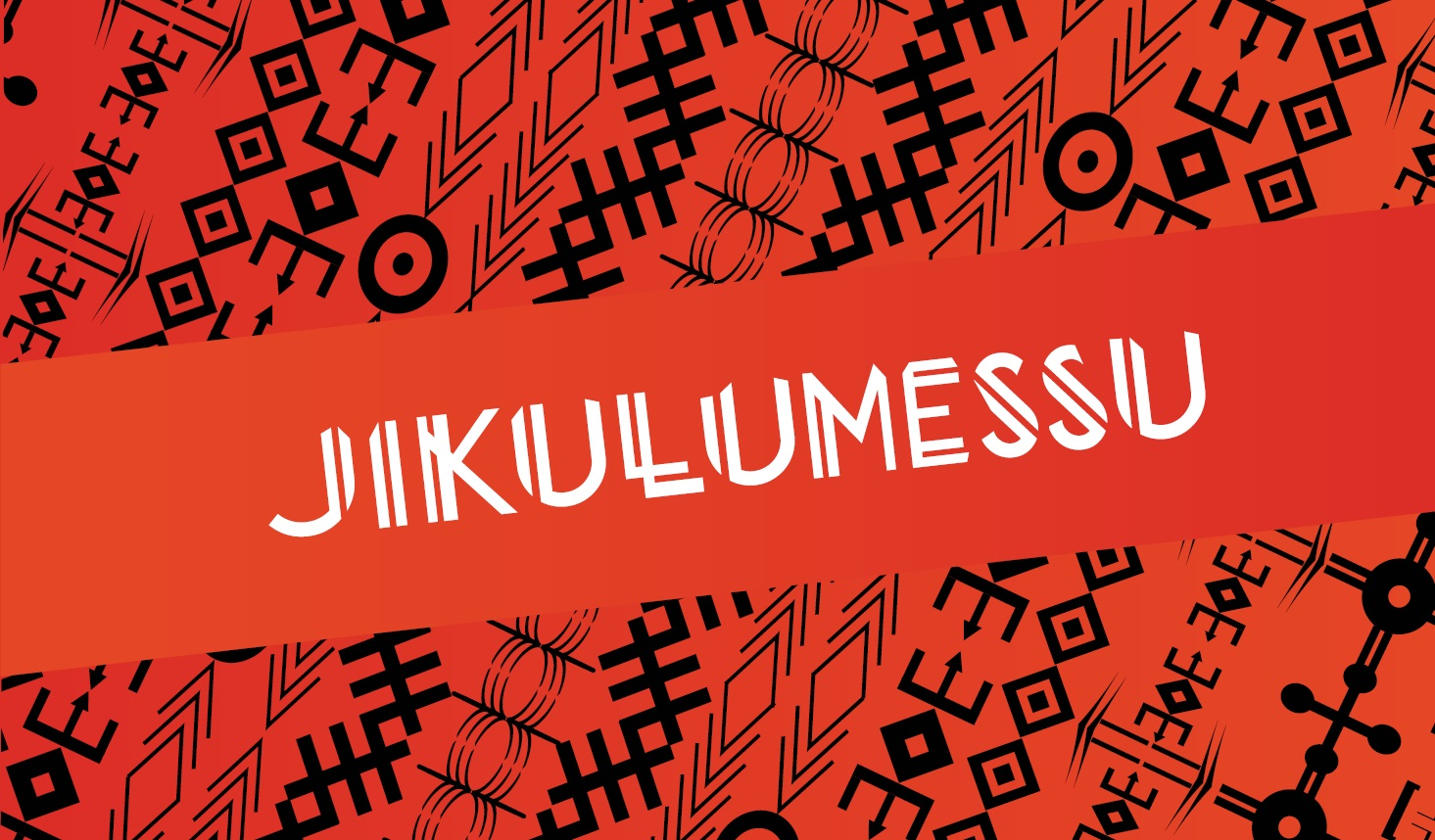
- Also known as: Jikulumessu: Abre o Olho; Jikulumessu: Open Your Eyes
- Genre: Telenovela
- Created by: Coréon Dú
- Written by: Coréon Dú; Alexandre Castro; Isilda Hurst; Divaldo Martins; Ana Sofia Fernandes; Andreia Vicente Martins; Erikson Pacheco Rodrigues; Joana Jorge; Luisa Sampaio; Noé João; Pedro Barboa da Silva
- Directed by: Marisa Tavares
- Starring: Eric Santos; Yaritsa Resende; Celso Roberto
- Opening theme: "Meu Negócio" by Manda Chuva and Fogo de Deus
- Country of origin: Angola
- Original language: Portuguese
- No. of episodes: 120

Production
- Production company: Semba Comunicação

Original release
- Network: TPA
- Release: 20 October 2014 – 10 May 2015

Jikulumessu: Abre o Olho is an Angolan telenovela produced by Semba Comunicação and which was broadcast in Angola from 20 October 2014 to 10 May 2015. The series had 175 episodes and aired at 21:00 local time.

The show was written by Coréon Dú, Alexandre Castro, Isilda Hurst, Divaldo Martins, Ana Sofia Fernandes, Andreia, Vicente Martins, Erikson Pacheco Rodrigues, Joana Jorge, Luisa Sampaio, Noé João, and Pedro Barbosa da Silva, and was directed by Marisa Tavares.

In Brazil, it was broadcast on TV Brasil from 25 May to 9 November 2017 at 20:30 local time.

The Angolan production was critically acclaimed internationally and was broadcast throughout Africa with English and French dubs done through channels such as Canal+ and Africa Magic, as was the case with the transmission in France and its territories through France Telévisions.

== Plot ==
The story begins in 1998 with 17-year old Joel Kapala. The teenager is accepted into one of the most prestigious Luanda schools so that he could complete his pre-tertiary studies, which provokes conflict within the Kapala family, primarily between his mother Laura and father Ivo, the owner of a car repair shop.

== Awards ==
Year	Award	Category	Result
2015	Seoul International Drama Awards	Best Drama Series	Won
2015	International Emmy	Best Telenovela	Nominated
2017	FESPACO	Best Television Series in Africa	Nominated
2017	Écrans noirs	Best TV Series	Nominated

== Cast ==
Role	Actor/Actress
Joel Kapala	Fernando Mailoge / Borges Macula
Djamila Pereira	Sandra Gomes / Heloísa Jorge
Ivo Kapala	Eric Santos
Laura Kapala	Ana Karina
Nina Kapala	Nicole Júlio / Canícia
Ruth Kapala	Erica Chissapa
Jordão Kapala	Mateus Cabaça
Bruno Maieco	Celso Roberto
Roberto Cabral	Ery Costa
Maria Cabral	Josefa Ferraz
Elisa Cabral	Constância Lopes
Lemba Cabral	Carla Aragão / Edusa Chindecasse
Nzola Cabral	Ana Almeida
Nayr Cange	Grace Mendes
Gerson Kapala	Rafael Almeida / Lialzio Almeida
José Loca	Orlando Sérgio
Flor Loca	Sónia Neves
Vanessa Loca	Filomena Reis / Henesse Cacoma
Daniel Nambe	Kiary Carneiro
Ana Nambe	Edna Gama
Carlos Nambe	Rui Orlando / Pedro Hossi
Bianca Nambe	Yaritssa Resende / Marta Faial
Walter Nambe	Miguel Hurst
Soraia Nambe	Isabel Silva
Emanuel Kiala	Daniel Martinho
Jurema Kiala	Isalina Gonçalves
Gregório Kiala	João Chaves / Fredy Costa
Pedro Kiala	Xavier António / Yuri de Sousa
Rui Paca	MacGonel
Elena Paca	Dinamene Boornois
Sara Paca	Elisângela Gomes / Maura Faial
Margarita Estevão	Maueza Monteiro
Felipe Estevão	Lélis Twevekamba
Weza Estevão	Sofia Buco
William Costa	Délcio Rodrigues / Emanuelson Manuel
Celso Capita	Joel Benoliel
Bento Machado	Kitemgo Kunga
Priscila Silva	Jesuina Silva
Nuno Nassoma	Joicelino Bembo / Jaime Joaquim
Hilário Nakombe	Adelino Caracol
Paulo Almeida	Sílvio Nascimento
Cândida Pereira	Ilda Costa
Kleyde Miranda	Henza Benchimol / Maya Zuda
Sheila Gaspar	Vanda Pedro
Cláudia Rodrigues	Lesliana Pereira
Lao Kim	Jani Zhao

== International broadcasts ==
Country	Broadcaster	Title
Angola	TPA Internacional	Jikulumessu - Abre O Olho
Portugal	RTP1	Jikulumessu - Abre O Olho
Brazil	TV Brasil	Jikulumessu
France	A+	Jikulumessu
Nigeria	Africa Magic	Jikulumessu
