= Pinhal Litoral =

Coordinates: 39°46′N 8°53′W

Map showing the location of the Pinhal Litoral subregion

Pinhal Litoral (Portuguese pronunciation: [piˈɲal lituˈɾal]) is a former NUTS3 subregion of Portugal integrating the Centro Region. It was abolished at the January 2015 NUTS 3 revision. It covered an area of 1,741 km^{2}, a population of 261,665 (as of 2005) and a density of 150 inhabitants/km^{2}. It has a diversified economic activity, mainly glass, plastics, wood and agriculture.

== Cities and towns ==
The main city is Leiria (pop. 50,176; {63,000 in urban area}. Other cities are Marinha Grande (29,000) and Pombal (18,000).

== Municipalities ==
It covers 5 municipalities:

- Batalha [town]
- Leiria [city] Capital of the urban community and Leiria-Fátima Diocese
- Marinha Grande [city]
- Pombal [city]
- Porto de Mós [town]
