= Guia (Pombal) =

- Civil parish
- Location in Portugal
- Coordinates: 39°56′48″N 8°47′05″W
- Country: Portugal
- Region: Centro
- Intermunic. comm.: Região de Leiria
- District: Leiria
- Municipality: Pombal
- Disbanded: 28 January 2013

Area
  - Total: 37.91 km^{2} (14.64 sq mi)

Population (2011)
  - Total: 2,672
  - Density: 70/km^{2} (180/sq mi)
- Time zone: UTC+00:00 (WET)
  - Summer (DST): UTC+01:00 (WEST)

Guia is a former civil parish in the municipality of Pombal, Portugal. In 2013, the parish merged into the new parish Guia, Ilha e Mata Mourisca. It had a population of 2,726 (2001) and an area of 37.91 km^{2}.
