= Carriço =

- Civil parish
- Location in Portugal
- Coordinates: 39°58′57″N 8°48′26″W
- Country: Portugal
- Region: Centro
- Intermunic. comm.: Região de Leiria
- District: Leiria
- Municipality: Pombal

Area
  - Total: 84.83 km^{2} (32.75 sq mi)

Population (2011)
  - Total: 3,653
  - Density: 43.06/km^{2} (111.5/sq mi)
- Time zone: UTC+00:00 (WET)
  - Summer (DST): UTC+01:00 (WEST)

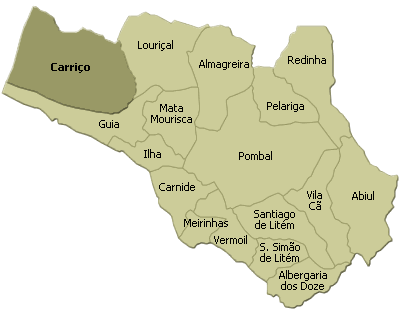
location of carriço in the parish of pombal

Carriço is a civil parish in the municipality of Pombal, Portugal. The population in 2011 was 3,653, in an area of 84.83 km².
