= Fredy Costa =

Angolan actor (born 1980)

- Born: 9 September 1980 (age 45); Luanda, Angola
- Occupations: actor; businessman; model
- Years active: 1999–present
- Spouse: Carmen Mouro (m. 2020)
- Children: 5

Fredy Costa (born 9 September 1980) is an Angolan-French actor, known for his roles in telenovelas such as Windeck and A Única Mulher. He was born in Luanda and raised in Paris, France.

He began his career as a model in 1999, having modeled for such companies as Unitel and Angola Telecom. He became the face of Martini in Angola in 2016.

He debuted on television with the TPA series Vidas Ocultas. He later had roles in the Angolan telenovelas Reviravolta, Sede de viver, Entre o Crime e a Paixão, Doce Pitanga and Voo Direto. In 2012, he took part in the telenovela Windeck, which was nominated for an Emmy Award in 2014, as Artur Domingos. He made his debut on Brazilian television in O Caçador. He later took part in the Emmy-nominated series Jikulumessu. In 2015, he was cast as Leandro Nascimento in the Portuguese telenovela A Única Mulher, and as Tiago Andrade in Ouro Verde, which won an Emmy in 2018. He also took part in the Brazilian telenovela Apocalipse, as well as the Portuguese-made productions A Teia and Quer o Destino.

Costa has 5 children, including 2 with singer Yola Araújo, Ayani and Jason. Costa dated Angolan-Portuguese actress Grace Mendes from 2013 to 2020. Later in 2020, he married Carmen Mouro. In 2007, he was sentenced to 6 months in prison for physically attacking actress Tânia Burity.

== Filmography ==
Year	Title	Broadcaster	Role
2001	Vidas Ocultas	TPA	
2002	Reviravolta	TPA	
2004	Sede de Viver	TPA	João Jorge
2006	Entre o Crime e a Paixão	TPA	
2008	Doce Pitanga	TPA	
2010	Voo Direto	TPA	Lourenço
2010	Voo Direto	RTP1	Lourenço
2012	Windeck	TPA	Artur Domingos
2014	O Caçador	Rede Globo	Haitian
2014	Jikulumessu	TPA	Gregório Kiala
2014	Jikulumessu	RTP1	Gregório Kiala
2015	A Única Mulher	TVI	Leandro Nascimento
2017	Ouro Verde	TVI	Tiago Andrade
2017	Apocalipse	RecordTV	Diogo Ferreira
2017	Maison Afrochic	Mundo Fox	
2019	A Teia	TVI	Danilo
2020	Terra Brava	SIC	Padre Casimiro
2020	Quer o Destino	TVI	Álvaro Freitas
2022	After Party	Mundo Fox	

== Awards ==
Year	Prize	Category	Nomination	Result
2001	Prémio Melhor Manequim Masculino			Won
2001	Revista Tropical			Won
2002	Moda Luanda			Won
2003	EXPO			Won
2004	Moda Luanda			Won
2005	Nagoya - Japão			Won
2010	Moda Luanda			Won
2012	Moda Luanda			Won
2013	FENAPRO			Won
2015	Moda Luanda			Won
2016	Moda Luanda			Won
2018	Prémio Melhor Ator	Best Drama Actor of 2018	Apocalipse	Won
