= Windeck (TV series) =

- Developed by: Semba Comunicação
- Directed by: Paulo Brito; Sérgio Graciano; Luís Pamplona; Paulo Rosa
- Starring: Tânia Burity; Micaela Reis; Raul Cachombo; Fredy Costa; Celso Roberto; Nádia Silva; Edusa Chindecasse
- Country of origin: Angola
- Original language: Portuguese
- No. of seasons: 1
- No. of episodes: 104

Original release
- Network: TPA 2
- Release: 2012 – 2013

Windeck is an Angolan television telenovela produced by Semba Comunicação and broadcast in Angola on RTP1, between April 8, 2013, and December 31, 2013, with a repeat of the last episode on January 2, 2014. The telenovela was nominated in 2013 for the International Emmy Awards for Best Telenovela with Avenida Brasil and Side by side, both from Rede Globo, and with 30 Vies, from Canada.

== Main Plot ==
Vittoria Kajibanga, an ambitious young girl from Moxico Province, Angola, uses her charm to achieve her goals. On the other hand, his older sister, Ana Maria, is simple and honest. Working at Divo, a major fashion magazine in Angola as a photographer, she has a crush on Kiluanji Voss, one of the heirs of the company.

The plot begins with Victoria's arrival in Luanda. Knowing her seductive nature and jealous of her beauty, Anna-Maria is particularly hostile towards her, and seeks to send her back to Moxico. However, she is not the only one who wants such a thing. Kassia Betancour, Kiluanji's suitor, and her mother Rosa also want to have her outside of Luanda, feeling threatened in the quest for the Voss fortune that they covet.

Thanks to her beauty and her sense of strategy and manipulation, Victoria conquers the heart of Xavier, the boss of Divo and father of Kiluanji and Luena, going so far as to rise to the position of intern at Divo with Kiluanji. She befriends Enda, a magazine journalist who later becomes her faithful accomplice, and moves in with him after Ana Maria kicks her out of her home. Over time, she tries to sympathize with Kiluanji, shows him the true side of Rosa and Kassia and even located Isaura, his missing mother by eavesdropping on Luena's phone call with her. After Ana Maria moves away from Kiluanji upon learning of Kassia's pregnancy which is actually false, Vittoria then takes a chance with him, and ends up becoming his girlfriend. However, Kiluanji still seems to be in love with Ana Maria. When he learns that she is leaving for China with a new suitor, he seeks to renew ties with her, even if it means breaking those that bind him to Vittoria. To win back his love, she orchestrates a car accident targeting Ana Maria, but ends up becoming the victim by saving her sister at the last minute, the plan worked, and Kiluanji is now beholden to Vittoria and gets engaged with her.

During Kiluanji's engagement party, Isaura returns from the shadows after a plan crafted by her and Luena and exposes to everyone a dark revelation regarding Xavier, who later is killed by an unknown person. With Xavier gone, Isaura provided evidence of Xavier's crimes to the authorities and helps facilitate the transfer of all Voss family assets to Wilson, with Isaura and her offspring receiving a smaller portion of the inheritance as well, including the mansion. Ofelia threatens to kick Isaura and her kids out of the Voss mansion, but Wilson reels her in, after reminding her of the background she came from.

Meanwhile, the thug that Vittoria hired for the hit-and-run attack returns to blackmail her. This puts a massive dent in her plans regarding Kiluanji as he begins to grow suspicious of her actions. He enlists Artur to pick up the thug who then meets Vittoria and Kiluanji at the Voss mansion, where he exposes her role in the incident. With Vittoria's true colors revealed, an enraged Kiluanji eventually kicks Vittoria out of his house. A massive shake-up at Divo occurs, with Wilson, now the new head of Divo expelling Rosa from the company. Rosa later then lured Isaura into Divo and tried to have her killed by setting a fire in the building, but Isaura gets rescued, and Rosa gets arrested by the police.

With Ana Maria on the verge of leaving for Rome to pursue a job offer, Kiluanji makes one final chance to win her back, and eventually catches up with her on her flight a few minutes before departure. He then apologized for his previous actions that ended up pushing her away from him and proposes to her, which she eventually says yes to. They both disembark from the plane and head back to the city, with the wedding also taking place later in the day. Vittoria and an increasingly disillusioned Enda plan a heist on the Vosses by stealing jewelry from their safe in the house, but were thwarted by Luena who calls the police, Enda escapes, but Vittoria gets arrested and incarcerated. With both Vittoria and Rosa out of their lives, both Kiluanji and Ana Maria begin a new life together.

== Secondary Plot ==
The series addresses other, darker issues in society through secondary characters. We have an employee of a catering agency, Jahir, victim of childhood violence by his mother. There's also Nadir, Divo's gossipy receptionist, who also faces domestic violence while living with her abusive fiancé later in the series.

This series also put emphasis on racial discrimination and prejudice, as Kiluanji's aunt, Ofelia had a fling with a European man in a previous affair which led to an early pregnancy that was discovered by her mate who then abandoned her to bear this on her own. As a result, she developed resentment for white people, and heavily despised of the idea of her daughter Luena dating a white man from her school named Pedro, who lives with his father Giorgio and his stepmother Mariza, the makeup artist in Divo who is also Ana Maria's best friend.

The series also talks about adoption. Yuri, Ofélia's illegitimate son, lives with Samsao and Nazaré, and works as a caterer for Girogio's business and as a part-time model in Divo. Until the end of the show, he was not aware of who his biological mother was. Furthermore, Xavier Voss also turns out to be adopted, and has usurped the family inheritance from Wilson, the legitimate son. When his ex-wife returns to expose the truth to everyone at their son's engagement, he is accidentally killed by Ofélia, who is furious at having been deceived.

== Cast ==
=== Main characters ===
- Micaela Reis as Vittoria Kajibanga
- Nádia Silva as Ana Maria Kajibanga
- Celso Roberto as Kiluanji Voss

=== Secondary characters ===
- Ery Costa as Xavier Voss
- Edusa Chindecasse as Luena Voss
- Eric Santos as Wilson Voss
- Tânia Burity as Ofélia Voss
- Grâce Mendès as Rosa Bettencourt
- Solange Hilario as Kassia Bettencourt
- Helena Moreno as Mariza Lemos Vasconcelos
- Raul Cachombo
- Vanda Pedro
- Yolanda Viegas
- Enoque Caraco

== Sequel ==
Windeck: Origins follows the show, acting as a prequel to the first season. The story centers on the previous generation, that of the youth of Xavier Voss, his brother Wilson, his wife Isaora and his accomplice and lover, Rosa Betancourt. She is also the narrator of this story, with Grace Mendès voice-over.
