= Pombal (parish) =

- Civil parish
- Location in Portugal
- Coordinates: 39°54′50″N 8°37′39″W
- Country: Portugal
- Region: Centro
- Intermunic. comm.: Região de Leiria
- District: Leiria
- Municipality: Pombal

Area
  - Total: 97.61 km^{2} (37.69 sq mi)

Population (2011)
  - Total: 17,187
  - Density: 180/km^{2} (460/sq mi)
- Time zone: UTC+00:00 (WET)
  - Summer (DST): UTC+01:00 (WEST)

Pombal is a civil parish in the municipality of Pombal, Portugal. The population in 2011 was 17,187, in an area of 97.61 km².
