= Pombal, Portugal =

Pombal
- Municipality
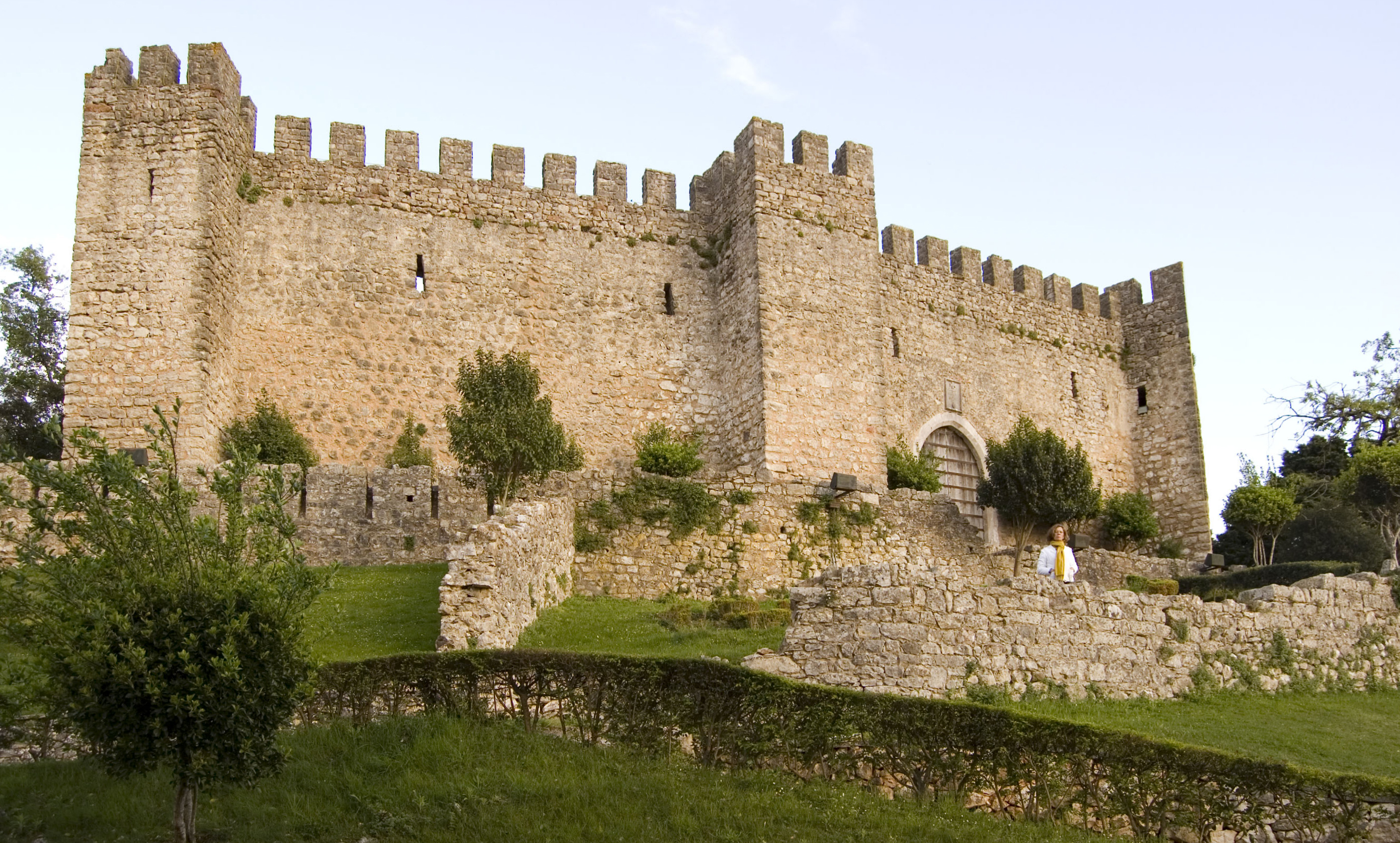
- Castle of Pombal

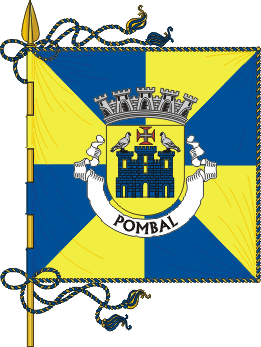
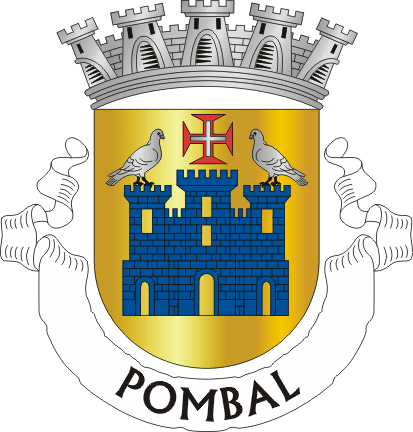
- Flag Coat of arms
- Interactive map of Pombal
- Coordinates: 39°54′58″N 08°37′41″W
- Country: Portugal
- Region: Centro
- Intermunic. comm.: Região de Leiria
- District: Leiria
- Parishes: 13

Government
  - President: Pedro Pimpão (PSD)

Area
  - Total: 626.00 km^{2} (241.70 sq mi)

Population (2011)
  - Total: 55,217
  - Density: 88.206/km^{2} (228.45/sq mi)
- Time zone: UTC+00:00 (WET)
  - Summer (DST): UTC+01:00 (WEST)
- Local holiday: St. Martin's Day; November 11
- Website: https://www.cm-pombal.pt/

Pombal (Portuguese pronunciation: [põˈbal]) is a city and a municipality located in the historical Beira Litoral province and in the região de Leiria of the Leiria district. The population in 2011 was 55217, in an area of 626.00 km^{2}. The population of the city of Pombal proper is about 18000 inhabitants.

The municipality is served by a railway station which is part of the Linha do Norte, the main Portuguese railway line that connects its two largest cities, Lisbon and Porto.

The Mayor is Luís Diogo de Paiva Morão Alves Mateus since 2013, elected by the Social Democratic Party. The municipal holiday is November 11 and celebrates St. Martin's Day.

In 2017, an 82-foot-long skeleton of a possible sauropod dinosaur was uncovered in a Pombal property owner's backyard.

In January 2026, Storm Kristin caused a catastrophic impact in the municipality of Pombal.

== Parishes ==
Administratively, the municipality is divided into 13 civil parishes (freguesias):

- Abiul
- Almagreira
- Carnide
- Carriço
- Guia, Ilha e Mata Mourisca
- Louriçal
- Meirinhas
- Pelariga
- Pombal
- Redinha
- Santiago e São Simão de Litém e Albergaria dos Doze
- Vermoil
- Vila Cã

== Heritage sites ==
- Castle of Pombal
- House of the Marquis of Pombal

== Sports ==
Sporting Clube de Pombal is the major sports club in Pombal. It was established on 20 October 1922 as the branch number 10 of Sporting Clube de Portugal (Sporting CP).

== Notable people ==
- Sebastião José de Carvalho e Melo, 1st Marquis of Pombal (1699-1782 in Pombal) a Portuguese statesman and diplomat, chief minister to King Joseph I, 1750 to 1777
- Pedro Roma (born 1970 in Pombal) a football goalkeeper with 386 club caps, mainly for Académica
- Carlos Mota Pinto (born 1936 in Pombal) a politician and the 7th Prime Minister of the Third Portuguese Republic
