= Bard College =

College in Annandale-on-Hudson, New York

- Former name: St. Stephen's College (1860–1934)
- Motto: Dabo tibi coronam vitae (Latin)
- Motto in English: I shall give thee the crown of life (Revelation 2:10)
- Type: Private liberal arts college
- Established: March 1860; 166 years ago
- Religious affiliation: Episcopal Church
- Academic affiliations: Annapolis Group
- Endowment: $1,064,525,802
- President: Jonathan Becker (acting)
- Provost: Deirdre d'Albertis
- Faculty: 231 FT/ 142 PT
- Students: 2,387 (2026, Main Annandale Campus); 6,515 (2026, Total)
- Undergraduates: 2,186 (2026, Main Annandale Campus); 340 (Bard Berlin Campus); 252 (Bard Jerusalem Campus)
- Postgraduates: 201 (2026, Main Annandale Campus); 108 (BardNYC Campus); 20 (Bard Graduate Center Campus)
- Doctoral students: 10 (Bard Graduate Center Campus)
- Other students: 2,780 (Bard College Early High School Campuses); 300 (Bard Prison Initiative); 184 (Simon's Rock Campus); 100 (Bard Microcollege Campuses); 34 (Bard NYC Undergraduate Exchange Program)
- Location: Annandale-on-Hudson, New York, United States; 42°1′13″N 73°54′36″W
- Campus: Rural, 1,260 acres (510 ha)
- Colors: Red and white
- Nickname: Raptors
- Sporting affiliations: NCAA Division III; Liberty League
- Website: bard.edu
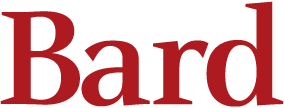

Bard College is a private liberal arts college in Annandale-on-Hudson, New York, United States. The campus overlooks the Hudson River and Catskill Mountains within the Hudson River Historic District and is a National Historic Landmark.

Founded in 1860, the institution consists of a liberal arts college and a conservatory. The college offers undergraduate and graduate programs. It participates in a network of many affiliated programs internationally.

== History ==
=== Origins and early years ===
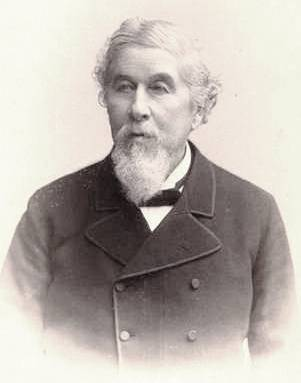
John Bard, founder of St. Stephen's College

During much of the nineteenth century, the land since owned by Bard was mainly composed of several country estates. These estates were called Blithewood, Bartlett, Sands and Ward Manor/Almont.

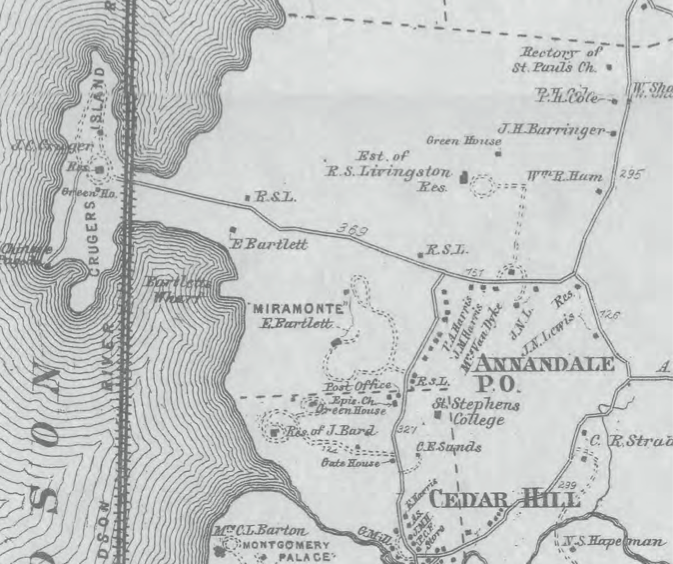
A map c. 1867 showing the various estates in the Town of Red Hook

In 1853, John Bard and Margaret Bard purchased a part of the Blithewood estate and renamed it Annandale. John Bard was the grandson of Samuel Bard, a prominent doctor, a founder of Columbia University's medical school, and physician to George Washington. John Bard was also the nephew of John McVickar, a professor at Columbia University. The family had strong connections with the Episcopal Church.

The following year, in 1854, John and Margaret established a parish school on their estate in order to educate the area's children. A wood-frame cottage, known today as Bard Hall, served as a school on weekdays and a chapel on weekends. In 1857, the Bards expanded the parish by building the Chapel of the Holy Innocents next to Bard Hall. During this time, John Bard remained in close contact with the New York leaders of the Episcopal Church. The church suggested that he found a theological college.

With the promise of outside financial support, John Bard donated the unfinished chapel, and the surrounding 18 acres (7.3 ha), to the diocese in November 1858. In March 1860, "St. Stephen's College" was founded. In 1861, construction began on the first St. Stephen's College building, a stone collegiate Gothic dormitory called Aspinwall, after early trustee John Lloyd Aspinwall, brother of William Henry Aspinwall. During its initial years, the college relied on wealthy benefactors, like trustee Cornelius Vanderbilt, for funding.

The college began taking shape within four decades. In 1866, Ludlow Hall, an administrative building, was erected. Preston Hall was built in 1873 and used as a refectory. A set of four dormitories, collectively known as Stone Row, were completed in 1891. And in 1895, the Greek Revival Hoffman Memorial Library was built. The school officially changed its name to Bard College in 1934 in honor of its founder.

=== 20th century growth and secularization ===
In the 20th century, social and cultural changes amongst New York's high society would bring about the demise of the great estates. In 1914, Louis Hamersley purchased the fire-damaged Ward Manor/Almont estate and erected a Tudor style mansion and gatehouse, or what is today known as Ward Manor. Hamersley expanded his estate in 1926 by acquiring the abandoned Cruger's Island estate. That same year, after Hamersley's combined estate was purchased by William Ward, it was donated to charity and served as a retirement home for almost four decades.

By the mid-1900s, Bard's campus significantly expanded. The Blithewood estate was donated to the college in 1951, and in 1963, Bard purchased 90 acres (36 ha) of the Ward Manor estate, including the main manor house. The rest of the Ward Manor estate became the 900-acre (360 ha) Tivoli Bays nature preserve.

In 1919, Bernard Iddings Bell became Bard's youngest president at the age of 34. His adherence to classical education, decorum, and dress eventually clashed with the school's push towards Deweyism and secularization, and he resigned in 1933.

In 1928, Bard merged with Columbia University, serving as an undergraduate school similar to Barnard College. Under the agreement, Bard remained affiliated with the Episcopal Church and retained control of its finances. The merger raised Bard's prestige; however, it failed to provide financial support to the college during the Great Depression. So dire was Bard's financial situation that in 1932, then-Governor of New York and College trustee Franklin D. Roosevelt sent a telegram to the likes of John D. Rockefeller Jr., George Eastman, and Frederick William Vanderbilt requesting donations for the college.

On May 26, 1933, Donald Tewksbury, a Columbia professor, was appointed dean of the college. Although dean for only four years, Tewksbury had a lasting impact on the school. Tewksbury, an educational philosopher, had extensive ideas regarding higher education. While he was dean, Tewksbury steered the college into a more secular direction and changed its name from St. Stephen's to Bard. He also emphasized the arts, something atypical of colleges at the time, and set the foundations for Bard's Moderation and Senior Project requirement. While Tewksbury never characterized Bard's curriculum as "progressive," the school would later be considered an early adopter of progressive education. In his 1943 study of early progressive colleges, titled General Education in the Progressive College, Louis T. Benezet used Bard as one of his three case studies.

During the 1940s, Bard provided a haven for intellectual refugees fleeing Europe. These included Hannah Arendt, the political theorist, Stefan Hirsch, the precisionist painter; Felix Hirsch, the political editor of the Berliner Tageblatt; the violinist Emil Hauser; the linguist Hans Marchand; the noted psychologist Werner Wolff; and the philosopher Heinrich Blücher. Arendt is buried at Bard, alongside her husband Heinrich Blücher, as is eminent novelist Philip Roth.

In 1944, as a result of World War II, enrollment significantly dropped putting financial stress on the college. In order to increase enrollment, the college became co-educational, thereby severing all ties with Columbia. The college became an independent, secular, institution in 1944. Enrollment more than doubled, from 137 students in 1944, to 293 in 1947.

Donald Fagen and Walter Becker's experiences at Bard prompted them to write the 1973 song "My Old School" for their rock group, Steely Dan. The song was motivated by the 1969 drug bust at Bard in which the college administration colluded. Fagen and Becker wrote another Steely Dan song, "Rikki Don't Lose That Number", about novelist, artist and former Bard faculty spouse Rikki Ducornet.

=== 21st century ===
In 2020, Bard College and Central European University became the founding members of the Open Society University Network, a collaborative global education initiative endowed with US$1 billion. As part of this new initiative, the college received a US$100 million gift from the Open Society Foundations which ranks among the largest financial contributions to a U.S. institution in recent history. In 2021, philanthropist George Soros made a $500 million endowment pledge to Bard College. It is one of the largest pledges of money ever made to higher education in the United States.

In June 2021, Bard College was declared an "undesirable organization" in Russia, becoming the first international higher education organization to be branded with this designation. Bard president Botstein hypothesized that this tag was due to their association with and funding from the Open Society Foundations which was also classified as undesirable in Russia and related conspiracy theories about George Soros.

Throughout the early 2010s, Bard College president Leon Botstein maintained a relationship with financier, child sex offender, and human trafficker Jeffrey Epstein, from whom he received gifts and donations to Bard totaling $150,000. Epstein repeatedly visited Bard by helicopter. Epstein had presented himself as a philanthropist interested in Bard's educational programs, particularly its arts and music programs, as well as taking an interest in Bard's high school early college model. Epstein made a $125,000 gift to Bard High School Early College in Queens, which added 30% to the high school's endowment.

In response, more than one hundred Bard alumni, including Fergie Chambers, the son of the then chair of the Bard College Board of Trustees James Cox Chambers, called on Botstein to resign as president. The scandal resulted in the resignation of Chambers as chairman and interest from the House Judiciary Committee. Botstein retired as president of Bard College on June 30, 2026, the end of his 51st academic year leading the institution.

Executive Vice President Jonathan Becker was appointed to serve as acting president beginnning in July 2026, with a term ending June 2027, at which point Marvin Krislov is planned to take on a three year term as interim president.

=== College leaders ===
At various times, the leaders of the college have been titled president, warden or dean. They are listed below:

1. George Franklin Seymour (1860–1861)
2. Thomas Richey (1861–1863)
3. Robert Brinckerhoff Fairbairn (1863–1898)
4. Lawrence T. Cole (1899–1903)
5. Thomas R. Harris (1904–1907)
6. William Cunningham Rodgers (1909–1919)
7. Bernard Iddings Bell (1919–1933)
8. Donald George Tewksbury (1933–1937)
9. Harold Mestre (1938–1939)
10. Charles Harold Gray (1940–1946)
11. Edward C. Fuller (1946–1950)
12. James Herbert Case Jr. (1950–1960)
13. Reamer Kline (1960–1974)
14. Leon Botstein (1975–2026)
15. Jonathan Becker (2026–present, acting)
16. Marvin Krislov (incoming, interim, 2027–2030)

== Campus ==
The campus of Bard College is in Annandale-on-Hudson, a hamlet in Dutchess County, New York, United States, in the town of Red Hook. It contains more than 70 buildings with a total gross building space of 1,167,090 sq ft (108,426 m^{2}) and was listed as a census-designated place in 2020. Campus buildings represent varied architectural styles, but the campus remains heavily influenced by the Collegiate Gothic and Postmodern styles.

Bard's historic buildings are associated with the early development of the college and the history of the Hudson River estates (see Bard College History). During a late twentieth-century building boom, the college embraced a trend of building signature buildings designed by prominent architects like Venturi, Gehry, and Viñoly.

In January 2016, Bard purchased Montgomery Place, a 380-acre (150 ha) estate adjacent to the Bard campus, with significant historic and cultural assets. The estate consists of a historic mansion, a farm, and some 20 smaller buildings. The college purchased the property from Historic Hudson Valley, the historical preservation organization that had owned Montgomery Place since the late 1980s. The addition of this property brings Bard's total campus size to nearly 1,000 acres (400 ha) along the Hudson River in Annandale-on-Hudson, New York.

In late 2023, Bard purchased 260 acres of land adjacent to the Montgomery Place campus in Barrytown, which used to be the campus of the Unification Theological Seminary. The property, originally owned by the Livingston and later Aspinwall families, features a mansion designed by William Appleton Potter. It was acquired by the De La Salle Brothers in 1928, who completed a large seminary and normal institute there in 1931. In turn, the property was sold in 1974 to the Unification Church. Bard College at Simon's Rock announced that it would be moving into the property in fall 2025. The purchase of the property brings Bard's total acreage to 1260 acres (510 ha).

The area around the campus first appeared as a census-designated place (CDP) in the 2020 Census, with a population of 358.

The college has some housing for faculty members. School-age dependents in this faculty housing are in the Red Hook Central School District.

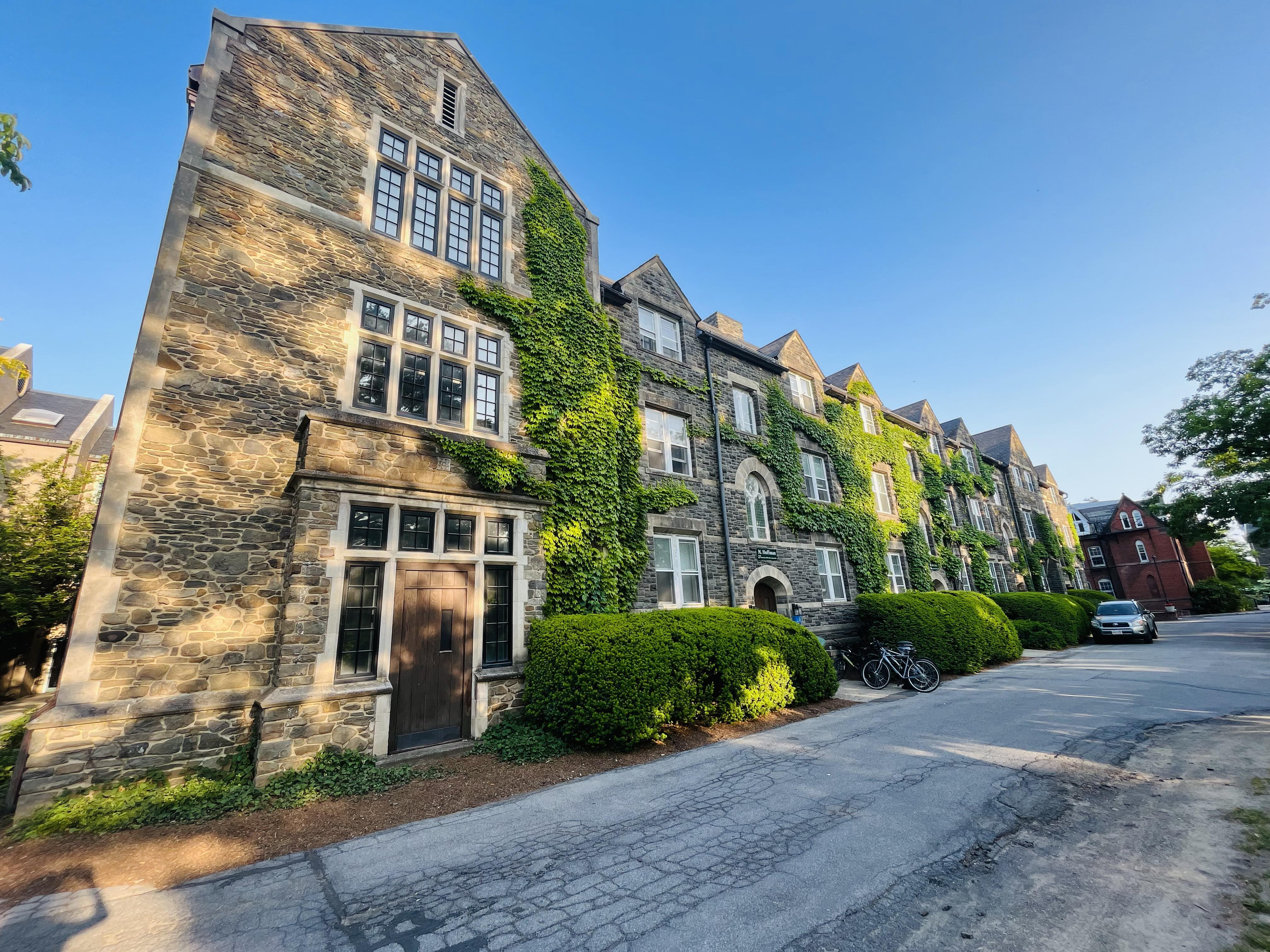
Stone Row, a dormitory built in 1891

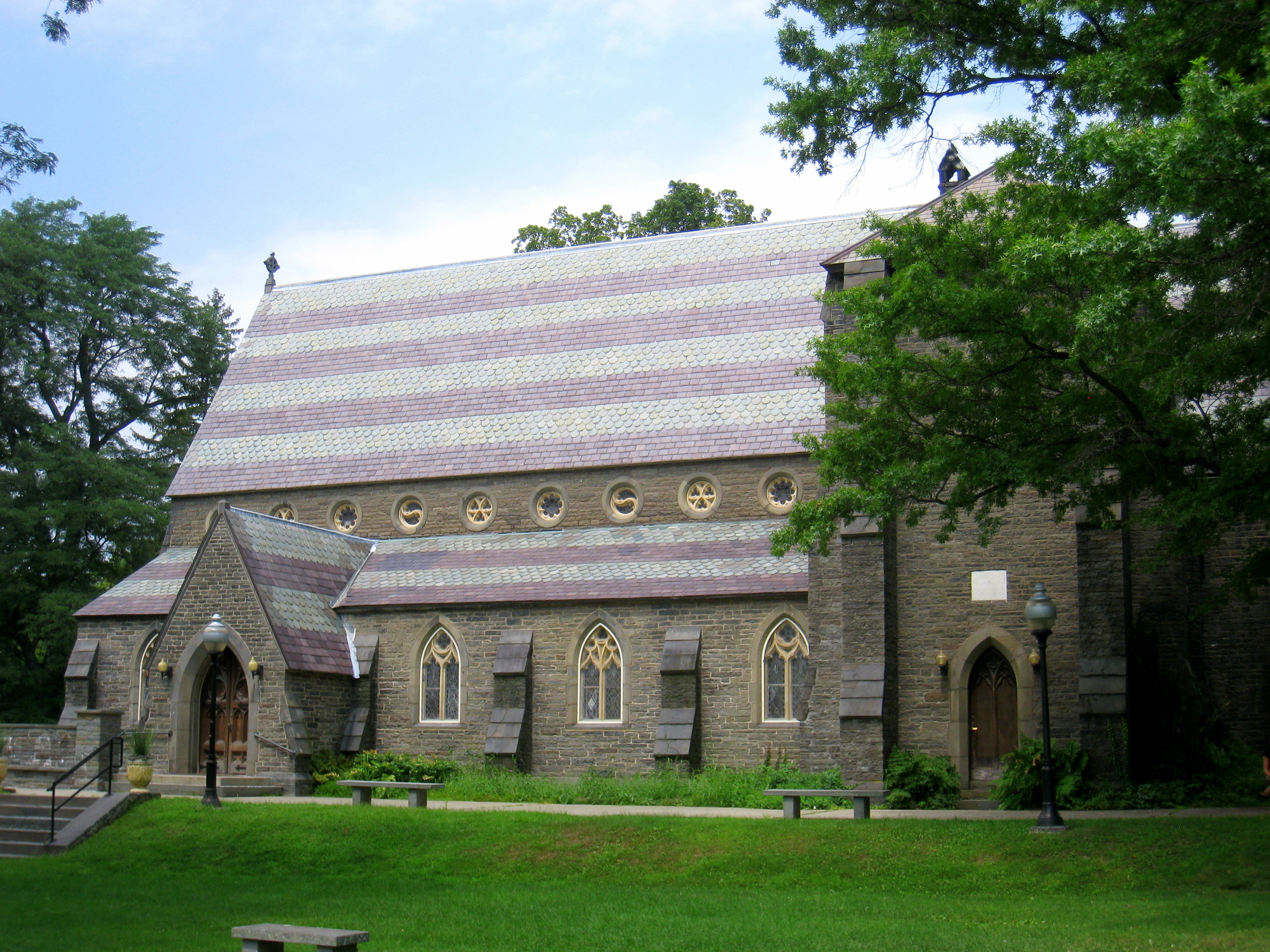
The Chapel of the Holy Innocents, built in 1857, serves several denominations on campus.

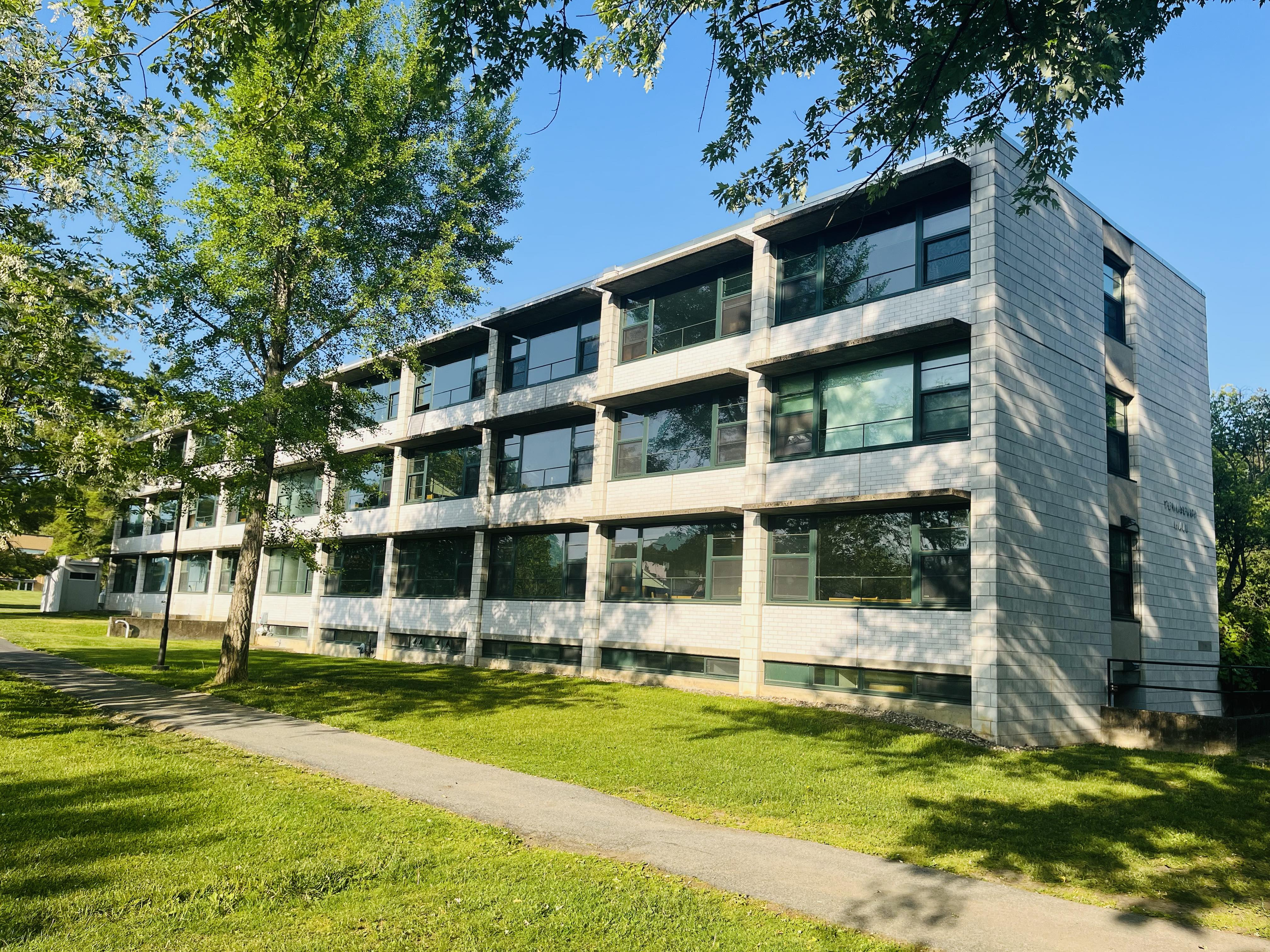
Tewksbury Hall, a dormitory

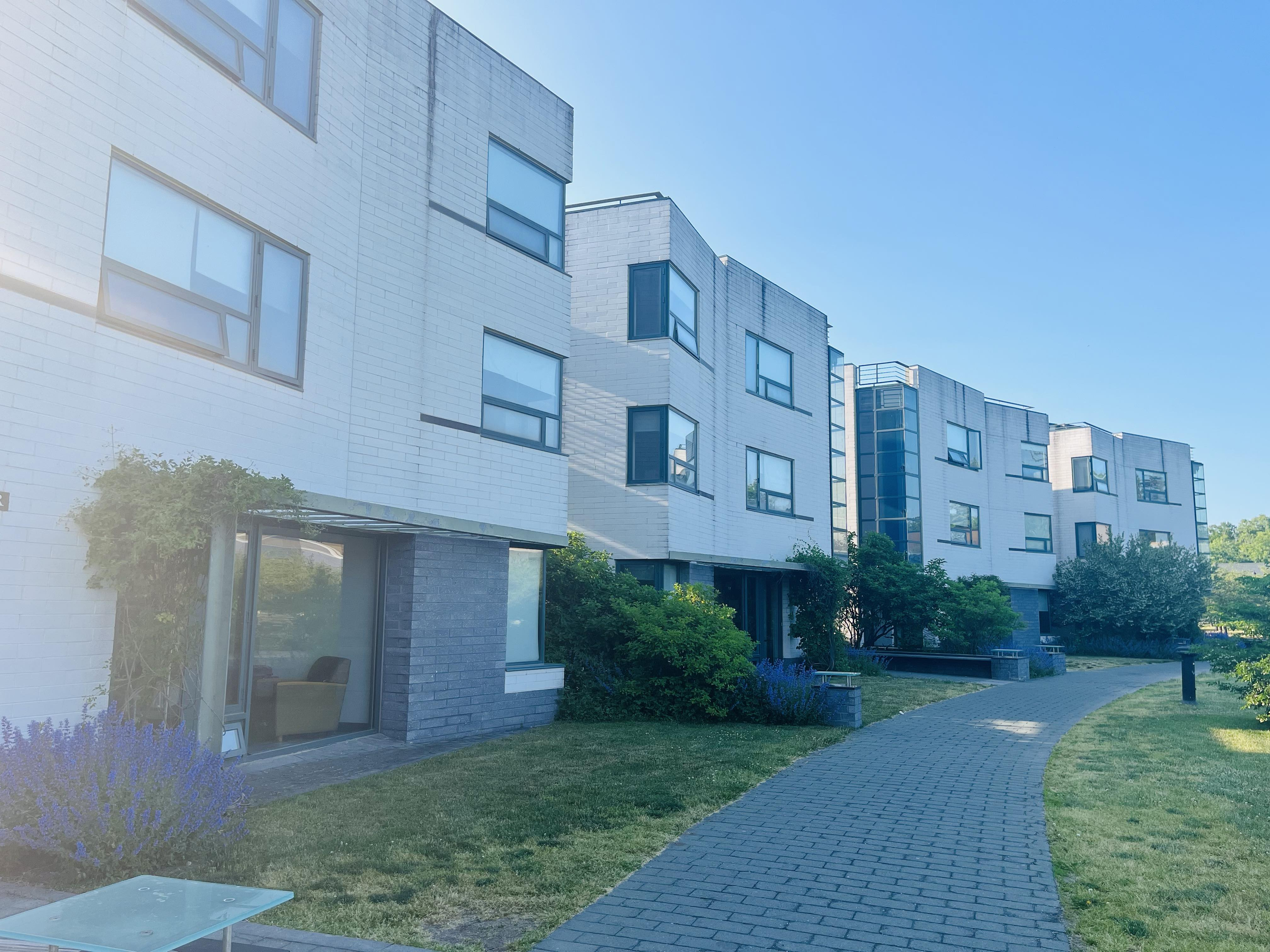
The Ravines, dormitories

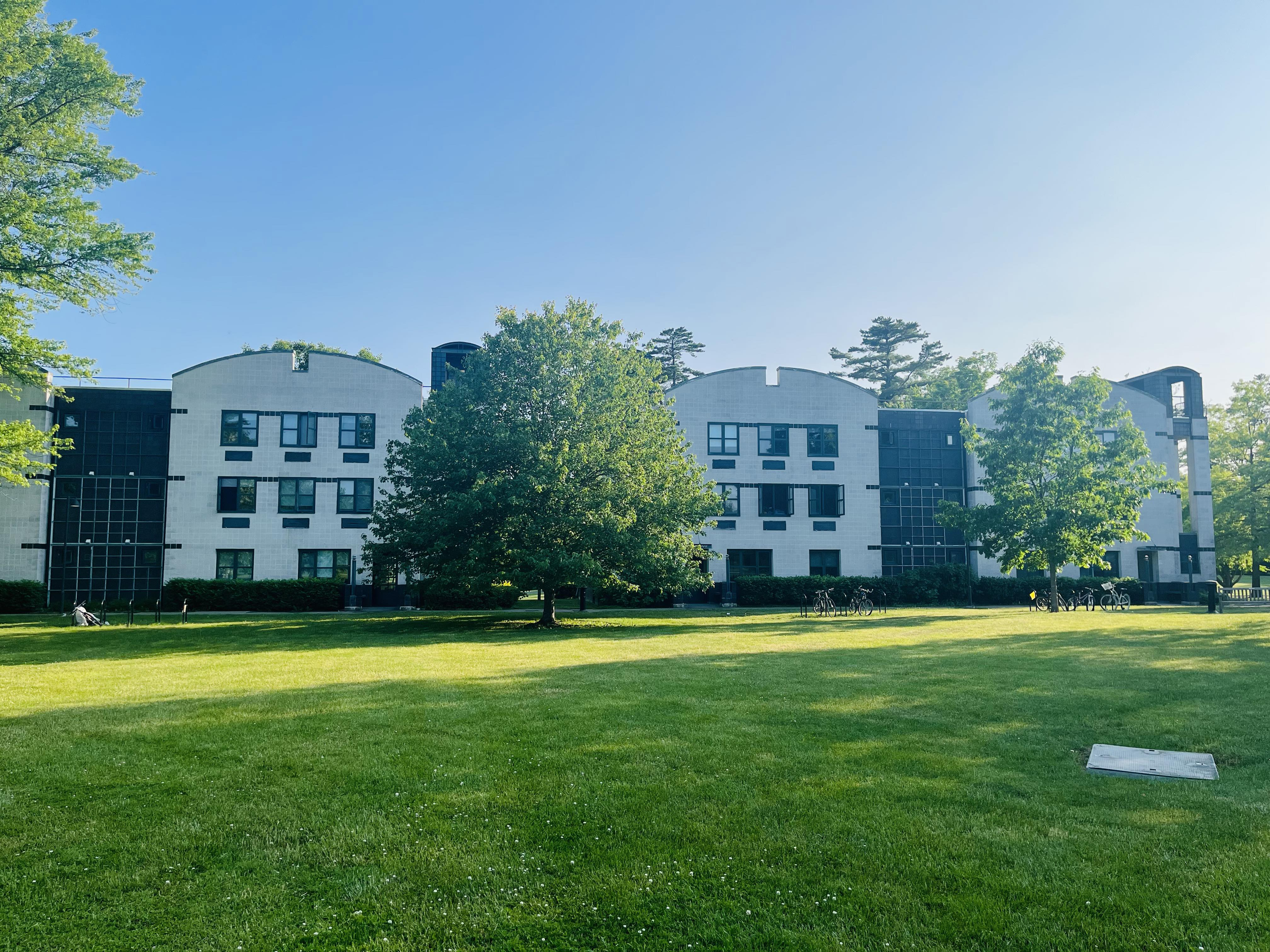
Alumni Houses, dormitories

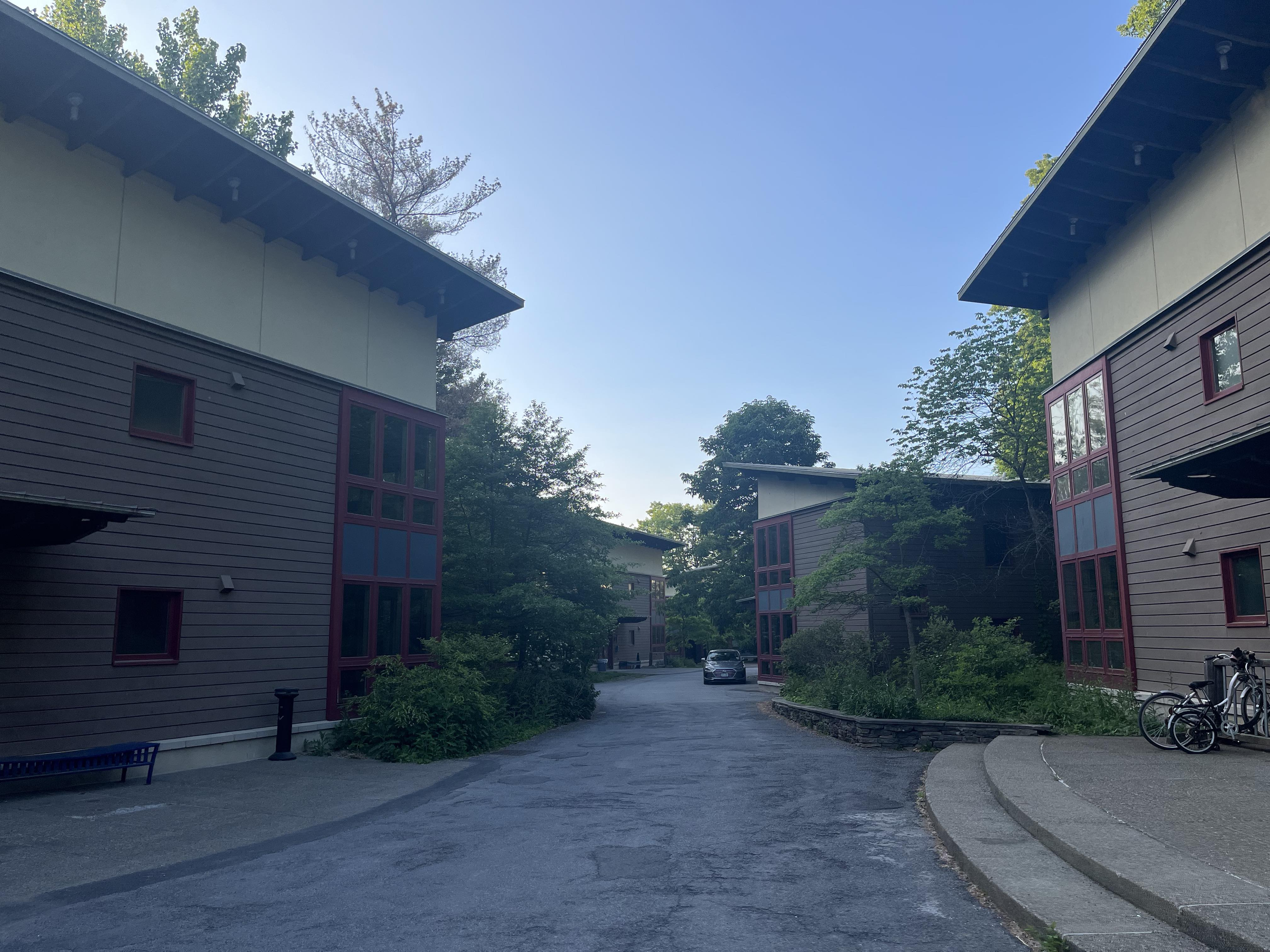
Stewart and Lynda Resnick Commons, a residential village with dormitories

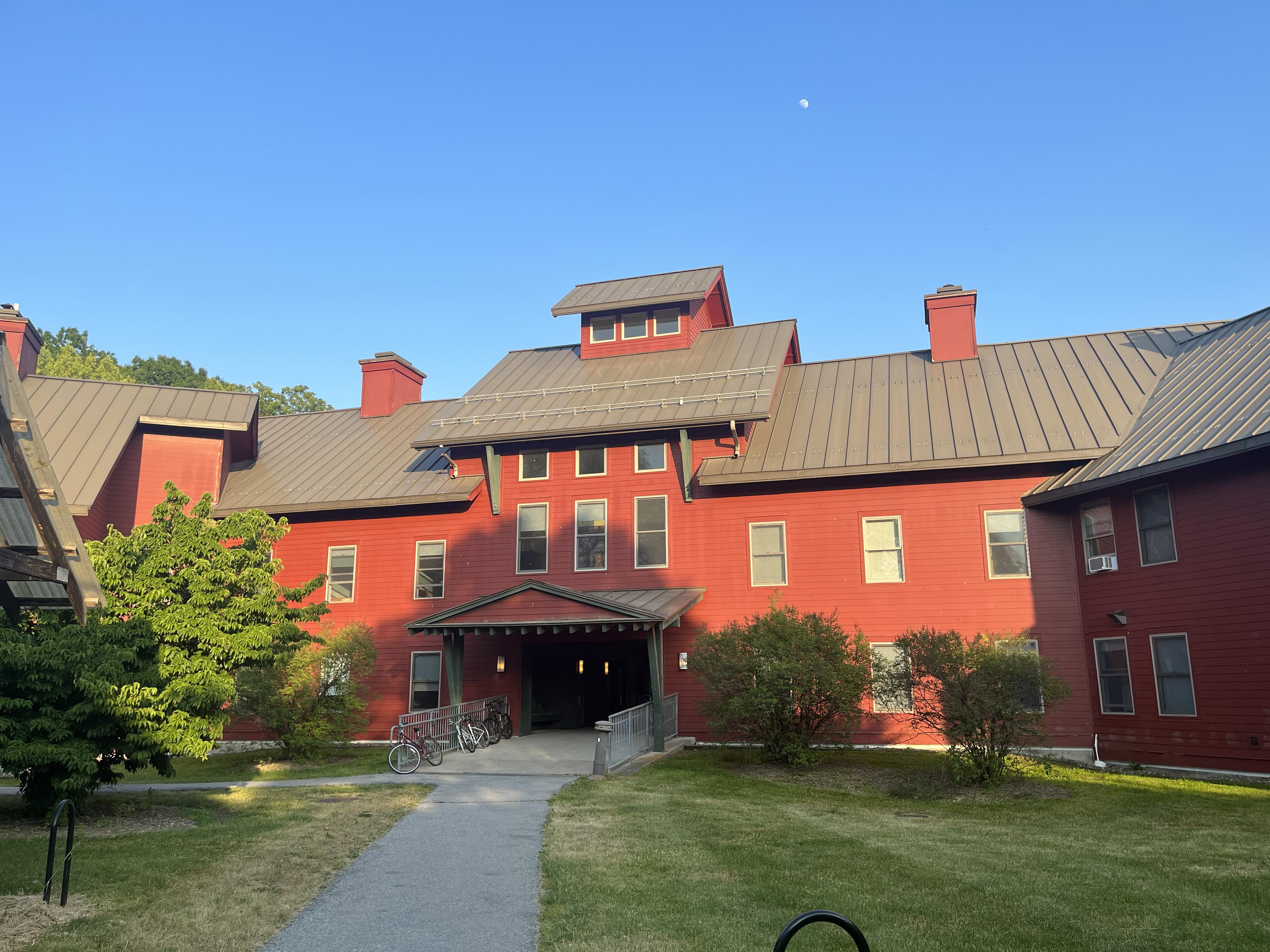
Cruger Hall, a dormitory

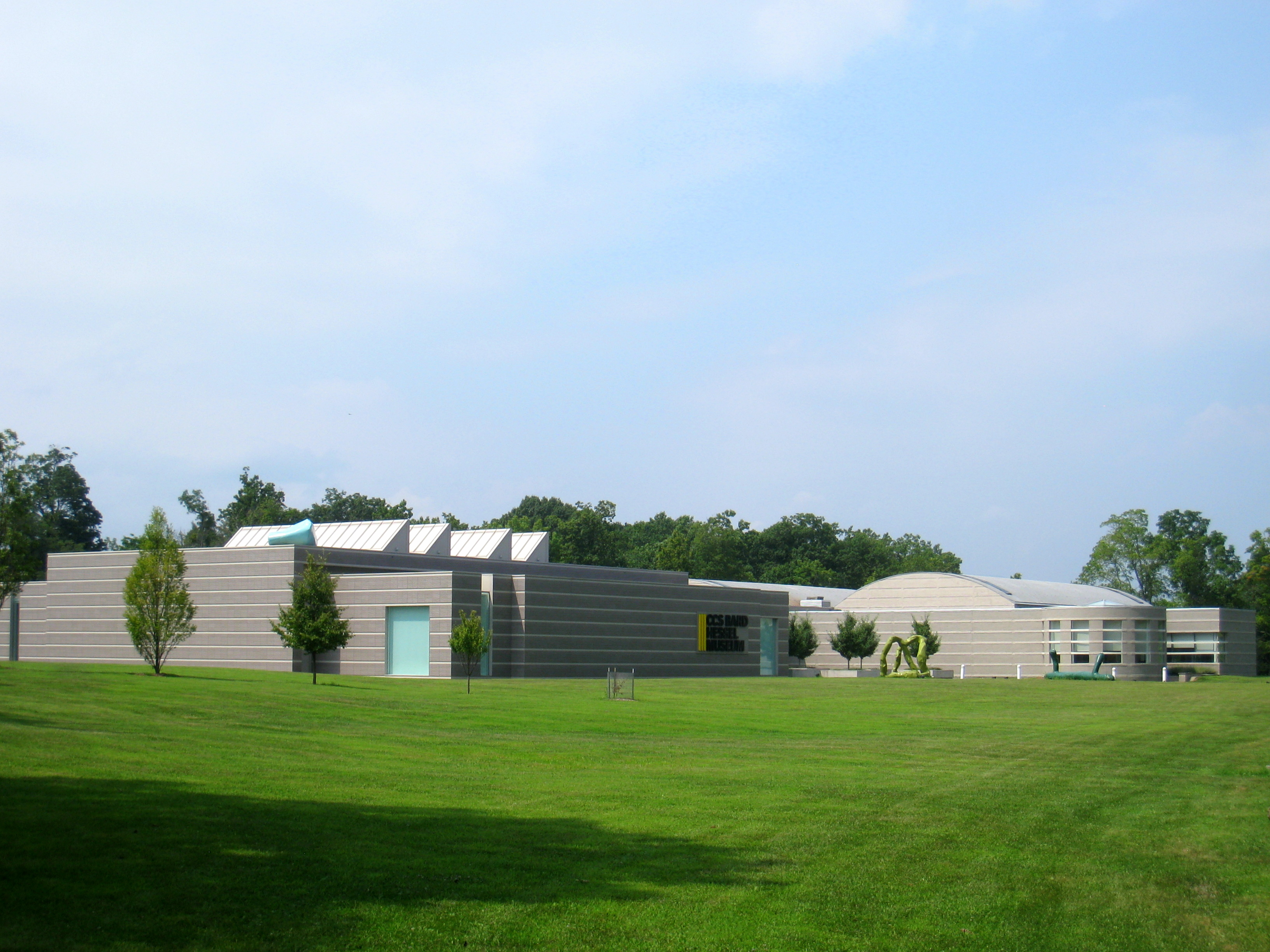
Hessel Museum, museum of contemporary art

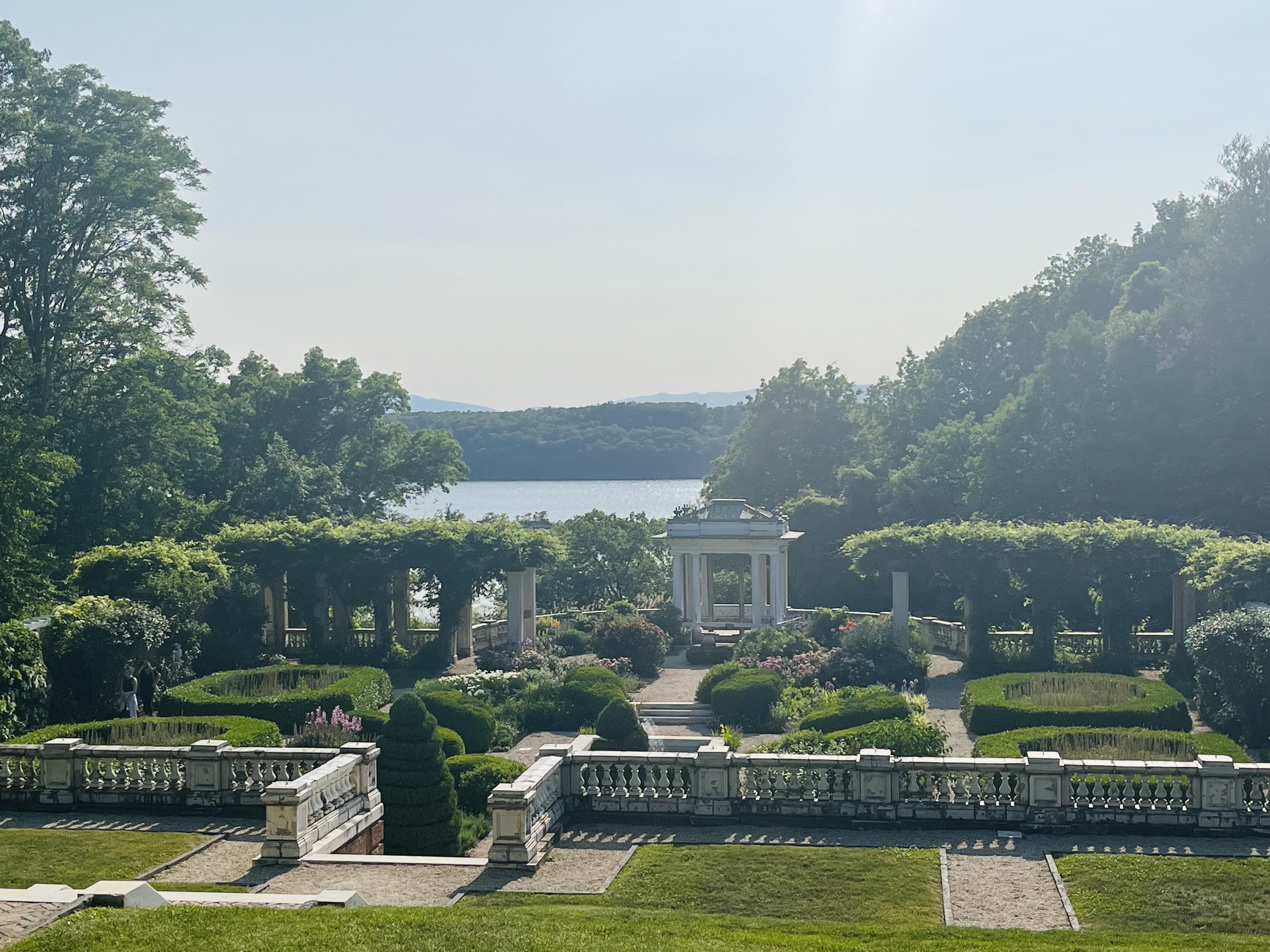
Blithewood Garden, Italianate walled garden

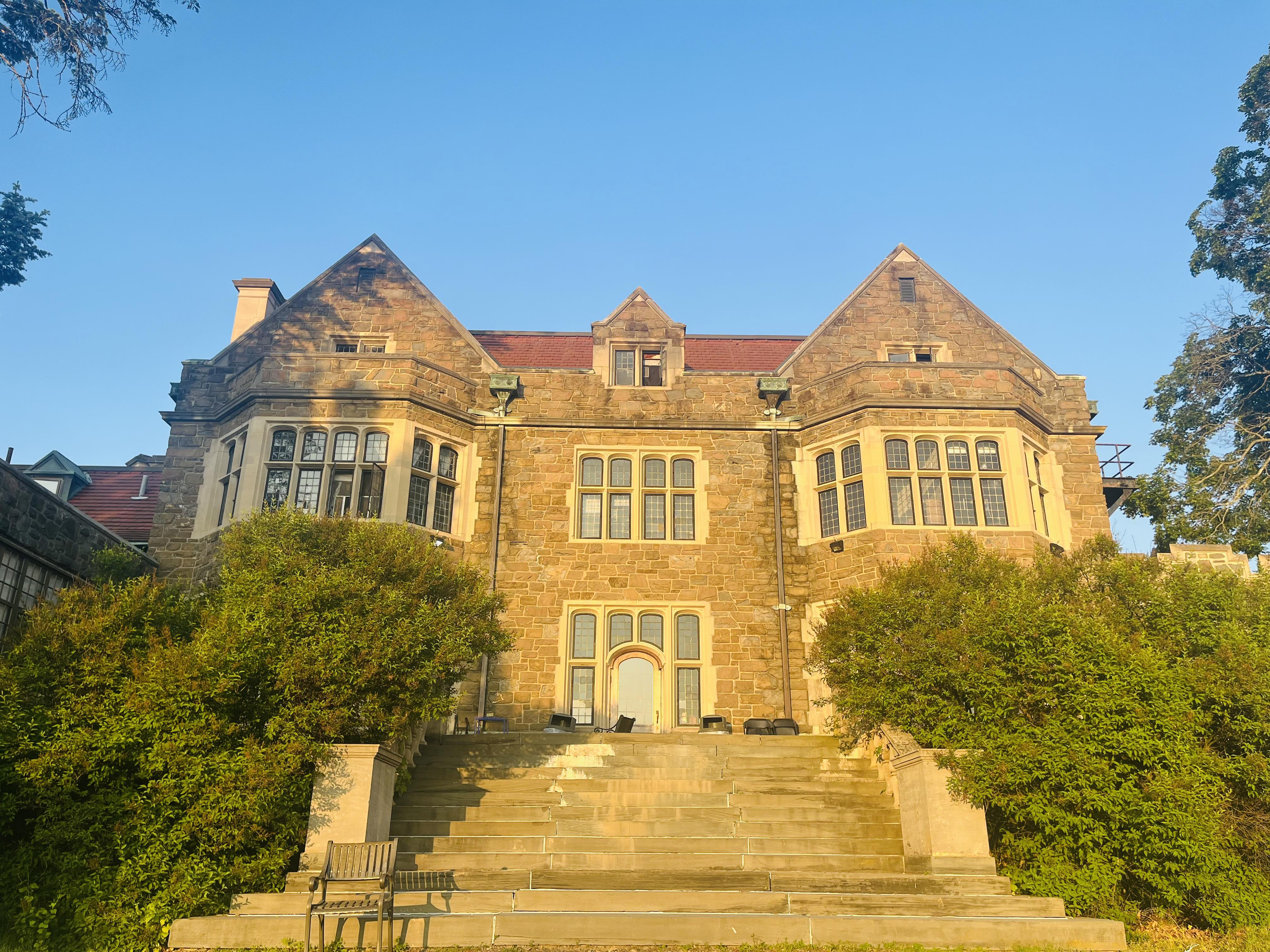
Ward Manor, built in 1918 and now used as a dormitory

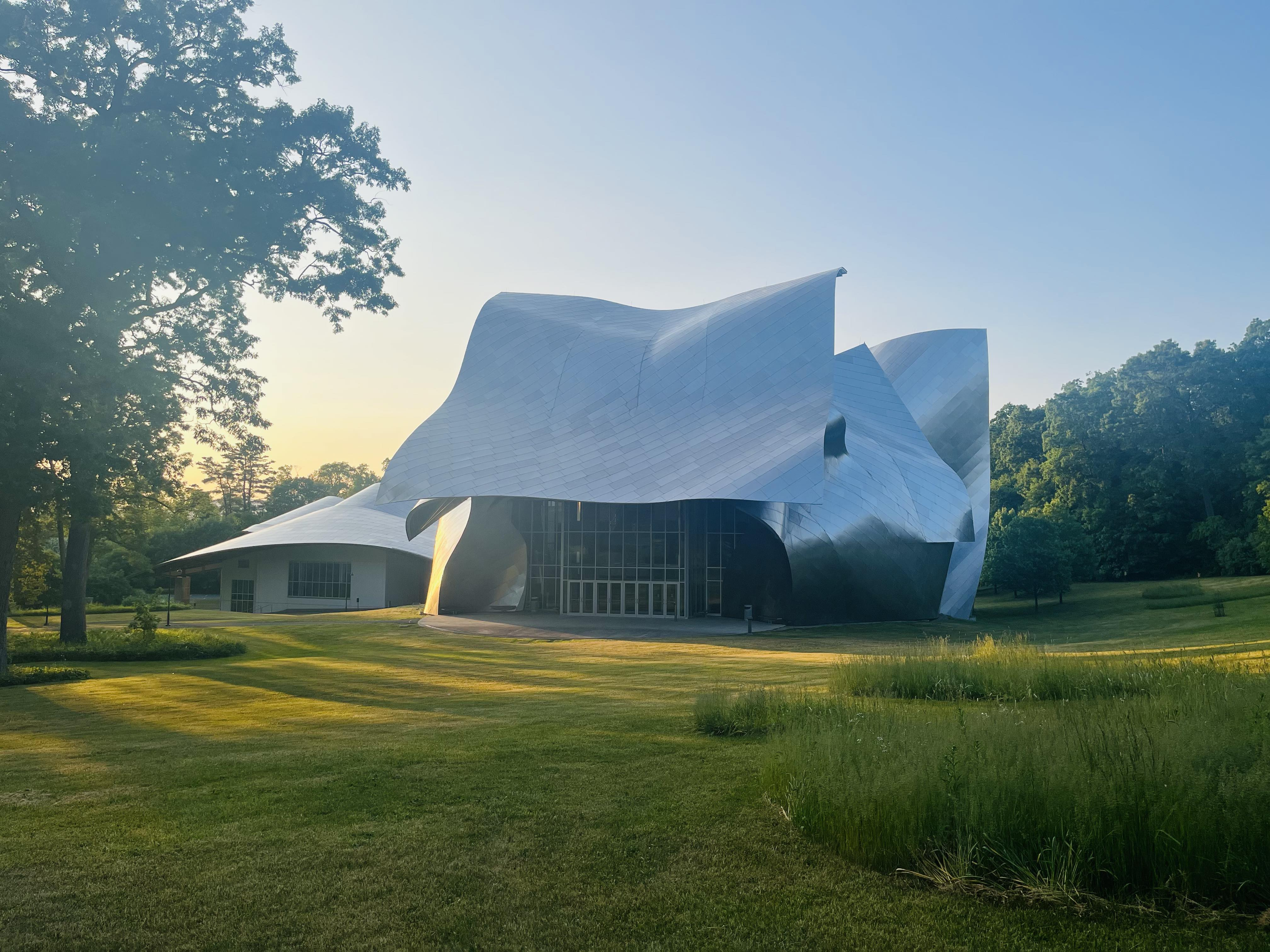
Fisher Center at Bard, performance hall designed by Frank Gehry

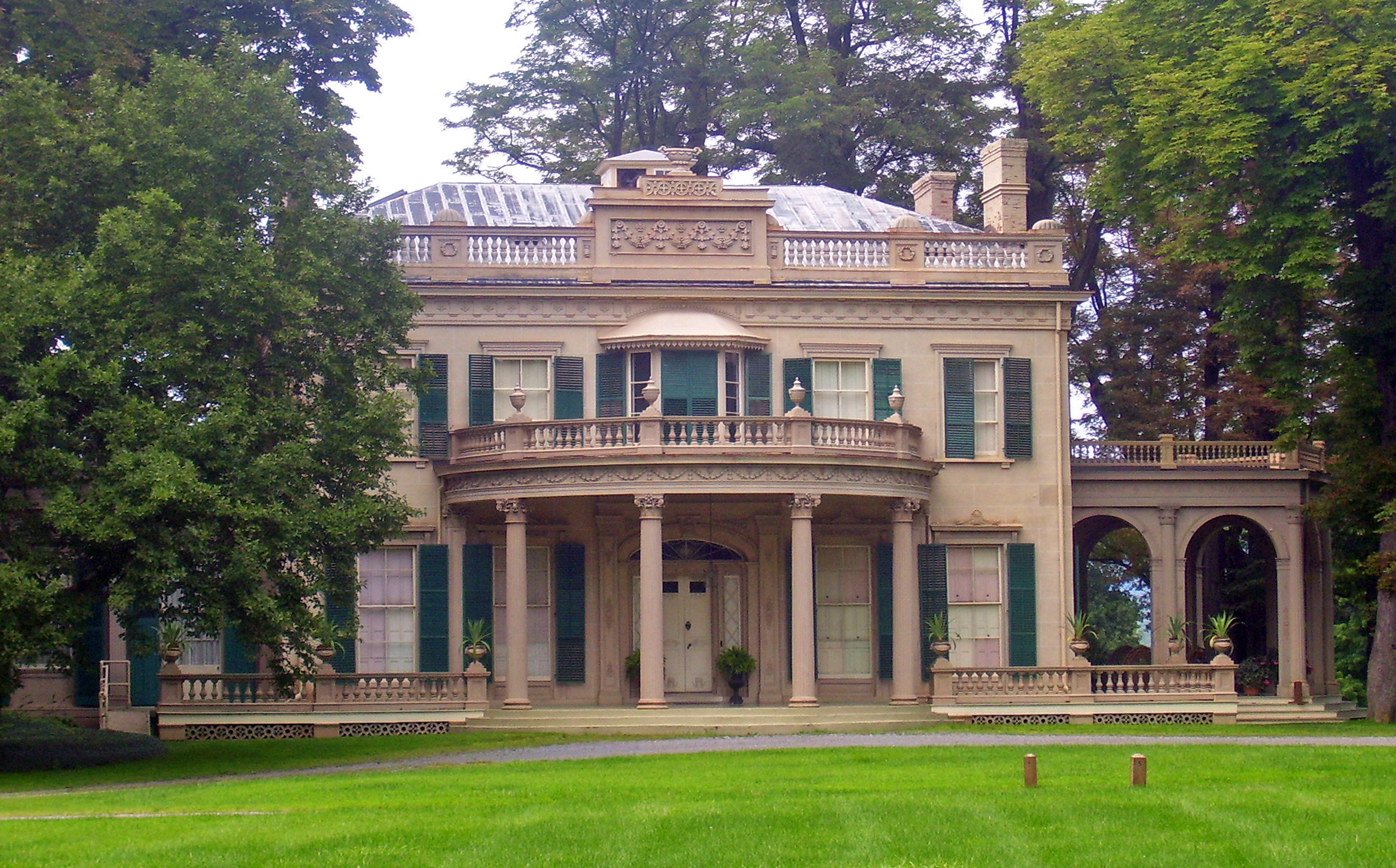
Montgomery Place, a historic mansion purchased by the college in 2016

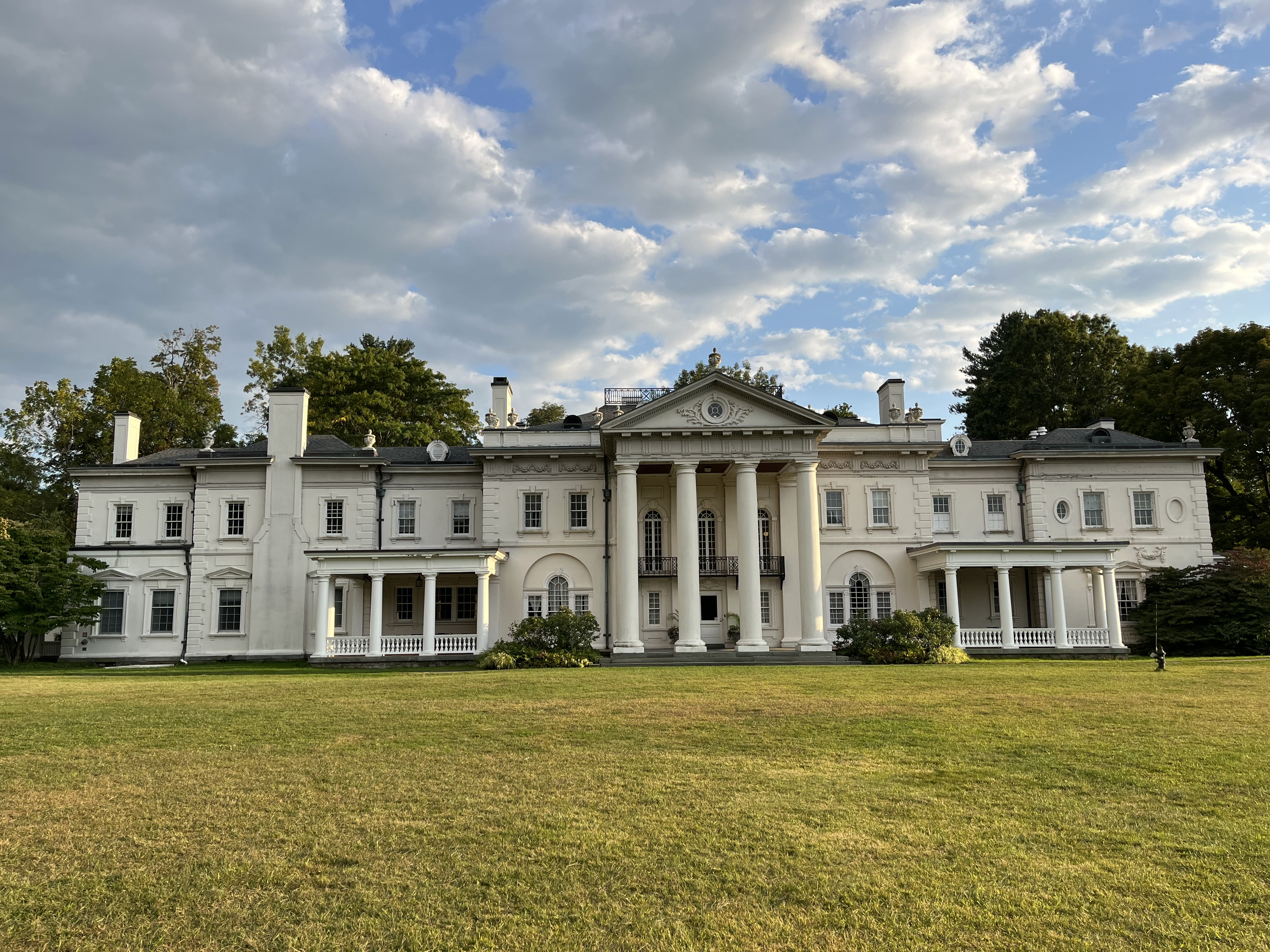
Blithewood Manor, a historic estate housing the Levy Economics Institute dating to 1899

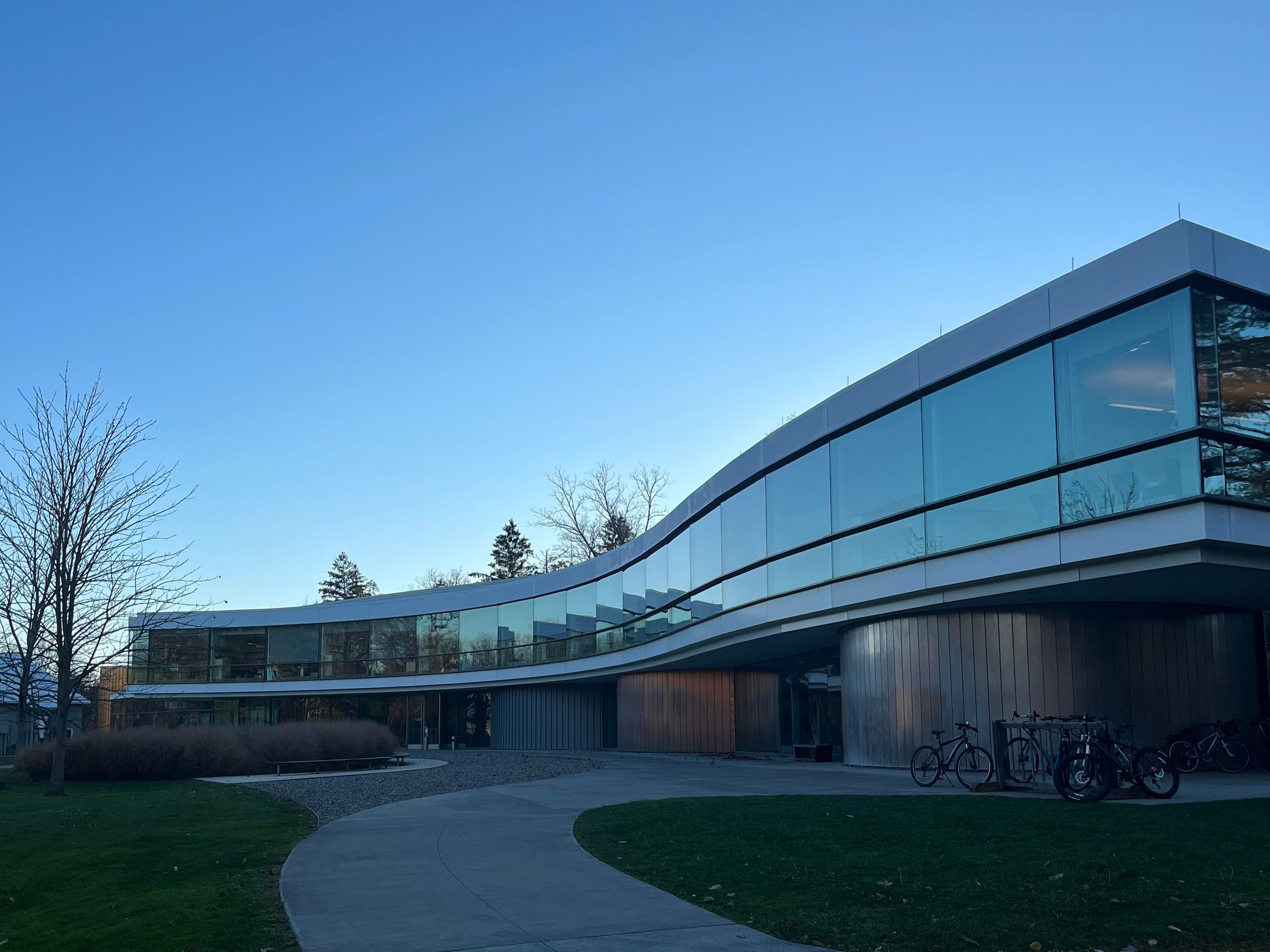
Reem-Kayden Center for Science and Computation

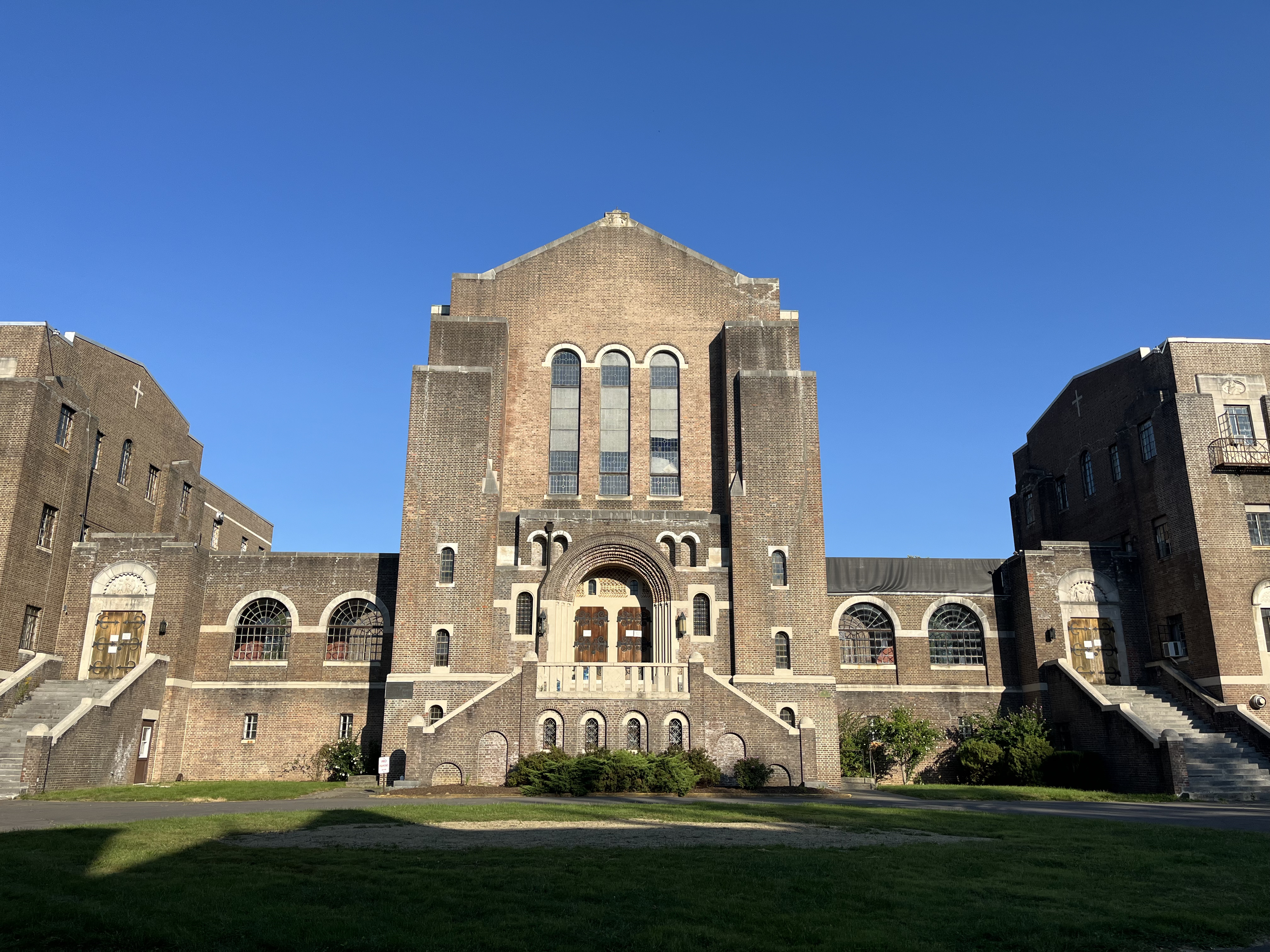
The Massena complex, currently home to Simon's Rock at Bard College

== Academics ==
=== Rankings and awards ===
Academic rankings

Liberal arts
- U.S. News & World Report: 71
- Washington Monthly: 50

National
- Forbes: 230
- WSJ/College Pulse: 264

In its 2025 edition of college rankings, U.S. News & World Report ranked Bard 71st overall, 5th in "Most Innovative Schools", tied at 33rd for "Best Undergraduate Teaching", tied at #38 in "Top Performers on Social Mobility", tied at #19 in "First-Year Experiences", and 19th for "Best Value" out of 211 "National Liberal Arts Colleges" in the United States. In 2024, Washington Monthly ranked Bard 50th among 194 liberal arts colleges in the U.S. based on its contribution to the public good, as measured by social mobility, research, and promoting public service.

Bard's Master of Fine Arts program was ranked one of ten most influential Master of Fine Arts programs in the world by Artspace Magazine in 2023.

Bard has been named a top producer of U.S. Fulbright Scholars. Many Bard alumni have also been named Watson Fellows, Critical Language Scholarship recipients, Davis Projects for Peace winners, Rhodes Scholars, Marshall Scholars, and Peace Corps fellows, among other postgraduate awards.

=== Undergraduate programs ===
In the undergraduate college, Bard offers Bachelor of Arts and Bachelor of Science degrees. There are 23 academic departments that offer over 40 major programs, as well as 12 interdisciplinary concentrations. The college was the first in the nation to offer a human rights major. Its most popular undergraduate majors, based on 2021 graduates, were: Fine/Studio Arts (106), English Language and Literature/Letters (81), and Biological and Physical Sciences (80).

=== Admissions ===
Bard's overall undergraduate acceptance rate stands at 41.7% with an enrollment yield of 22.9% for the most recent entering class of 460 students. For undergraduate admissions the immediate decision plan acceptance rate stands at 89.4% and the early decision acceptance rate stands at 65.6%. Admission rates to graduate programs at Bard are typically more selective with an acceptance rates of 5.7% for CCS Bard Masters in Curatorial Studies, 7.6% for Bard's low residency MFA, 25.0% for the Levy Economics Institute, 56.8% for the MA in Teaching program, 18.2% for the MBA in sustainability, 35.5% for the masters program at the Center for Environmental Policy, and 6.8% for the Bard Graduate Center in Manhattan. The acceptance rate to the conservatory of music stands at 13.6%. Of the incoming undergraduate students 77% receive some form of institutional financial aid, 23% are full tuition paying students, and 24% are Pell Grant recipients. Bard does not require applicants to submit SAT or ACT test scores in order to apply. As an alternative, applicants may take an examination composed of 19 essay questions in four categories: Social Studies; Languages and Literature; Arts; and Science, Mathematics, and Computing, with applicants required to complete three 2,500-word essays covering three of the four categories. For admitted students who submitted test scores, 50% had an SAT score between 1296 and 1468 or an ACT score between 28 and 33, with a reported average GPA of 3.79. Admissions officials consider a student's GPA a very important academic factor. Honors, AP, and IB classes are important, an applicant's high school class rank is considered, and letters of recommendation are considered very important for admissions officials at Bard.

=== Graduate programs ===
Bard College offers a range of postgraduate degree programs, including the Bard MFA, Bard Graduate Center, Center for Curatorial Studies, Center for Human Rights and the Arts, Center for Environmental Policy, Bard MBA in Sustainability, Levy Economics Institute, the Master of Arts in Teaching, and the Master of Arts in Global Studies.

=== Bard MFA ===
Milton Avery Graduate School of the Arts is a nontraditional graduate school for interdisciplinary study in the visual and creative arts. The program takes place over two years and two months, with students residing on campus during three consecutive summers, and two winter sessions of independent study completed off campus. Notable artists and writers that have been affiliated with the Bard MFA as faculty and visiting artists include Marina Abramovic, Eileen Myles, Paul Chan, Robert Kelly, Tony Conrad, Okkyung Lee, Yto Barrada, Carolee Schneemann, Lynne Tillman, and Ben Lerner.

==== Bard Graduate Center ====
The Bard Graduate Center: Decorative Arts, Design History, Material Culture is a graduate research institute and gallery located in New York City. Established in 1993, the institute offers a two-year MA program and a PhD program that began in 1998. The institute's facilities include a gallery space at 18 West 86th Street and an academic building with a library at 38 West 86th Street.

==== Center for Curatorial Studies ====
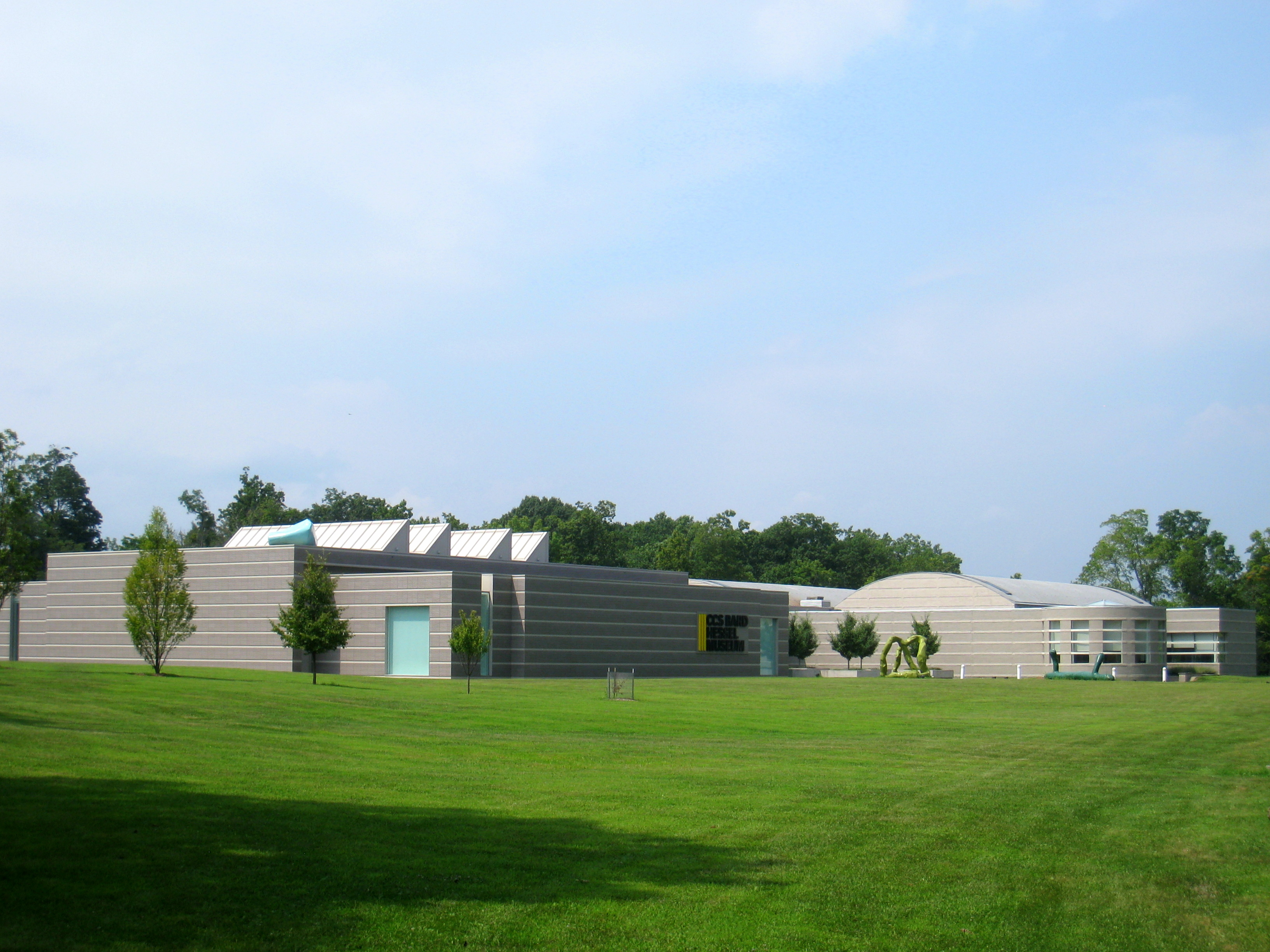
CCS Bard and Hessel Museum

The Center for Curatorial Studies, Bard College (CCS Bard) established in 1990, is a museum and research center dedicated to the study of contemporary art and exhibition practices from the 1960s to the present. In 1994, CCS Bard launched its (MA) Master of Arts in Curatorial Studies program. The center also hosts public events throughout the year including lectures and panel discussions on topics in contemporary art.

The museum, spanning an area of 55,000 square feet, offers a variety of exhibitions accessible to the general public throughout the year. It houses two distinct collections, the CCS Bard Collection and the Marieluise Hessel collection, which has been loaned to CCS Bard on a permanent basis. Artists such as Keith Haring, Julian Schnabel, Wolfgang Tillmans, Stephen Shore, and Cindy Sherman, among numerous others, are featured within these collections.

The CCS Bard Library is a research collection for contemporary art with a focus on post-1960s contemporary art, curatorial practice, exhibition histories, theory, and criticism. in 2023 historian Robert Storr donated over 25,000 volumes to the Center for Curatorial Studies, Bard College, nearly doubling the total collection size to 63,000 volumes.

In 2022 CCS Bard received $50 million from a $25 million donation from the Gochman Family Foundation to form a Center for American and Indigenous Studies at CCS Bard and a matching donation of $25 million from George Soros. This followed two 2021 gifts of $25 million, one from Marieluise Hessel and a matching donation from Soros.

==== Levy Economics Institute ====
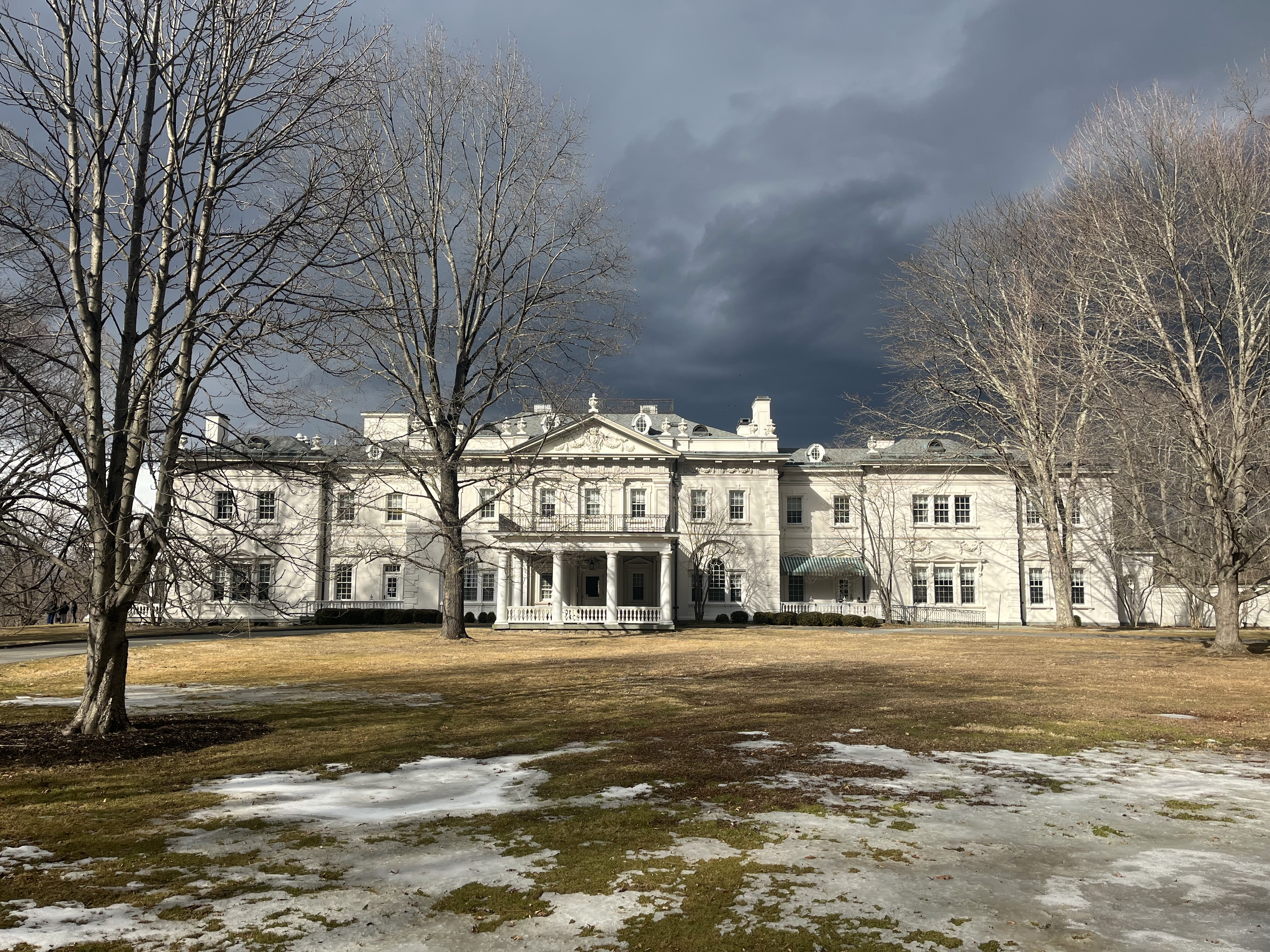
Blithewood Manor houses the Levy Economics Institute

Levy Economics Institute is a public policy think tank focused on generating public policy responses to economic problems. Through research, analysis, and informed debate, the institute aims to enable scholars and leaders from business, labor, and government to collaborate on common interest issues.

== Endowment ==
Bard has access to multiple, distinct endowments. Bard, along with Central European University, is a founding member of the Open Society University Network, endowed with $1 billion from philanthropist George Soros, which is a network of universities to operate throughout the world to better prepare students for current and future global challenges through integrated teaching and research. As of 2025 Bard maintained its own endowment of approximately $395,986,151. In July 2020, Bard received a gift of $100 million from the Open Society Foundations, which will dispense $10 million yearly over a period of ten years. In April 2021, Bard received a $500 million endowment challenge grant from George Soros. On January 21 2026 the Open Society Foundation and Bard College published a joint newsletter signaling the successful completion of the endowment drive, Bard raised $520 of the $500 million over 5 years meeting the pledge amount set by George Soros and the Open Society Foundation, creating the first institutional endowment in the college's history. As of 2026 Bard College's endowment is $1,064,525,802.

== Programs, centers, and associated institutes ==
Bard has developed several graduate programs and research institutes, including the Milton Avery Graduate School of the Arts, the Levy Economics Institute which began offering a Masters of Science in Economic Theory and Policy in 2014, the Center for Curatorial Studies and Art in Contemporary Culture, the Bard Center for Environmental Policy, the Bard College Conservatory of Music, the ICP-Bard Program in Advanced Photographic Studies in Manhattan, the Master of Arts in Teaching Program (MAT), the Bard College Clemente Program, and the Bard Graduate Center in Manhattan.

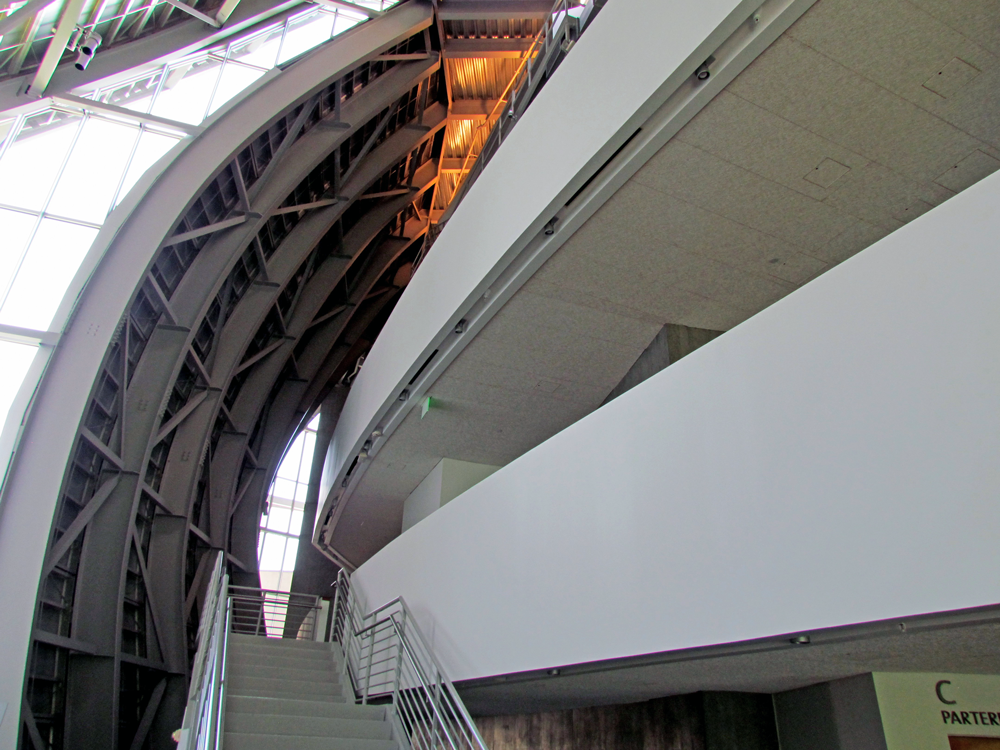
Interior view of the Gehry-designed Fisher Center

In 1990, Bard College acquired, on permanent loan, art collector Marieluise Hessel's substantial collection of important contemporary artwork. In 2006, Hessel contributed another $8 million (USD) for the construction of a 17,000-square-foot addition to Bard's Center for Curatorial Studies building, in which the collection is exhibited.

The Bard Prison Initiative (BPI) provides a liberal arts degree to incarcerated individuals (prison education) in seven prisons in New York State, and enrolls over 400 students.

In February 2009, Bard announced the first dual degree program between a Palestinian university and an American institution of higher education. The college entered into a collaboration with Al-Quds University involving an honors college, a master's program in teaching and a model high school. In August 2023, Bard entered a partnership with Parami University. to award dual bachelor degree to Parami undergraduate students.

In accordance with AlQuds-Bard requirements, students are not allowed to decide their major during the first year of their studies; instead, as a liberal arts college, students are advised to diverge in different classes that would allow them to decide what program they would like to take interest in as in the following year.

In June 2011, Bard acquired the Longy School of Music in Cambridge, Massachusetts, and in November 2011, Bard took ownership of the European College of Liberal Arts in Berlin, Germany, to become Bard College Berlin.

== Student life ==
Over 120 student clubs are financed through Bard's Convocation Fund, which is distributed once a semester by an elected student body and ratified during a public forum. Bard College has one print newspaper, the Bard Free Press, which was awarded a Best in Show title by the Associated Collegiate Press in 2013. In 2003, the Bard Free Press won Best Campus Publication in SPIN Magazine's first annual Campus Awards.

College radio station WXBC was founded in 1947. In 2006, it was nominated for "Station of the Year" and "Biggest Improvement" in the CMJ College Radio Awards.

== Athletics ==
Bard athletics wordmark

Bard College teams (nicknamed the Raptors) participate as a member of the National Collegiate Athletic Association's Division III. The Raptors are a member of the Liberty League. Prior conference affiliations include the Skyline Conference and the former Hudson Valley Athletic Conference. Women's sports include basketball, cross country, lacrosse, soccer, swimming & diving, tennis, track & field, volleyball and squash. Men's sports include baseball, basketball, cross country, soccer, squash, swimming & diving, tennis, track & field and volleyball.

Bard College Rugby Football Club fields men's and women's teams that compete in the Tristate Conference, affiliated with National Collegiate Rugby. Additional club sports include: ultimate frisbee, fencing, and equestrian.

== Alumni and faculty ==
=== Notable alumni ===
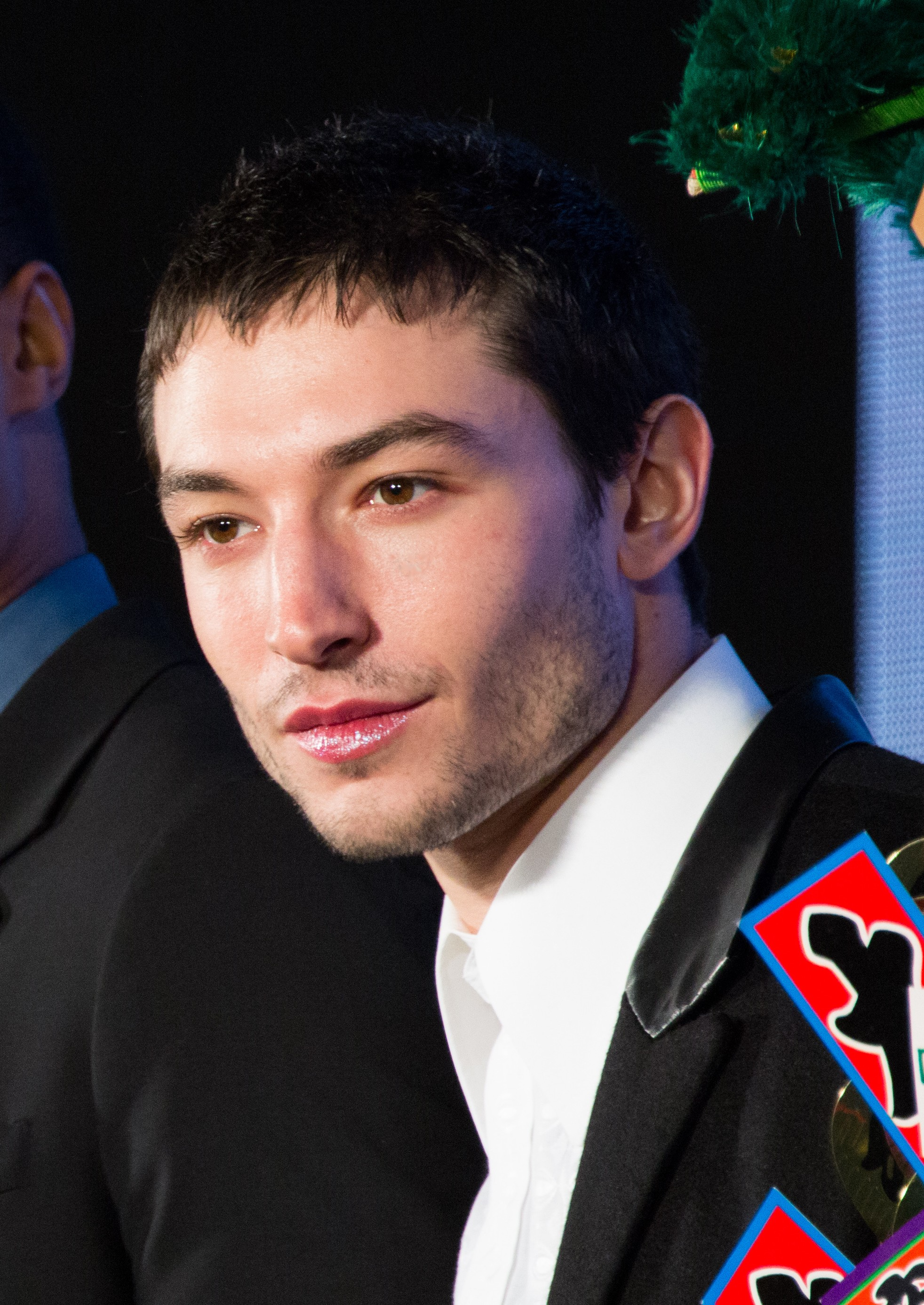
Ezra Miller, actor

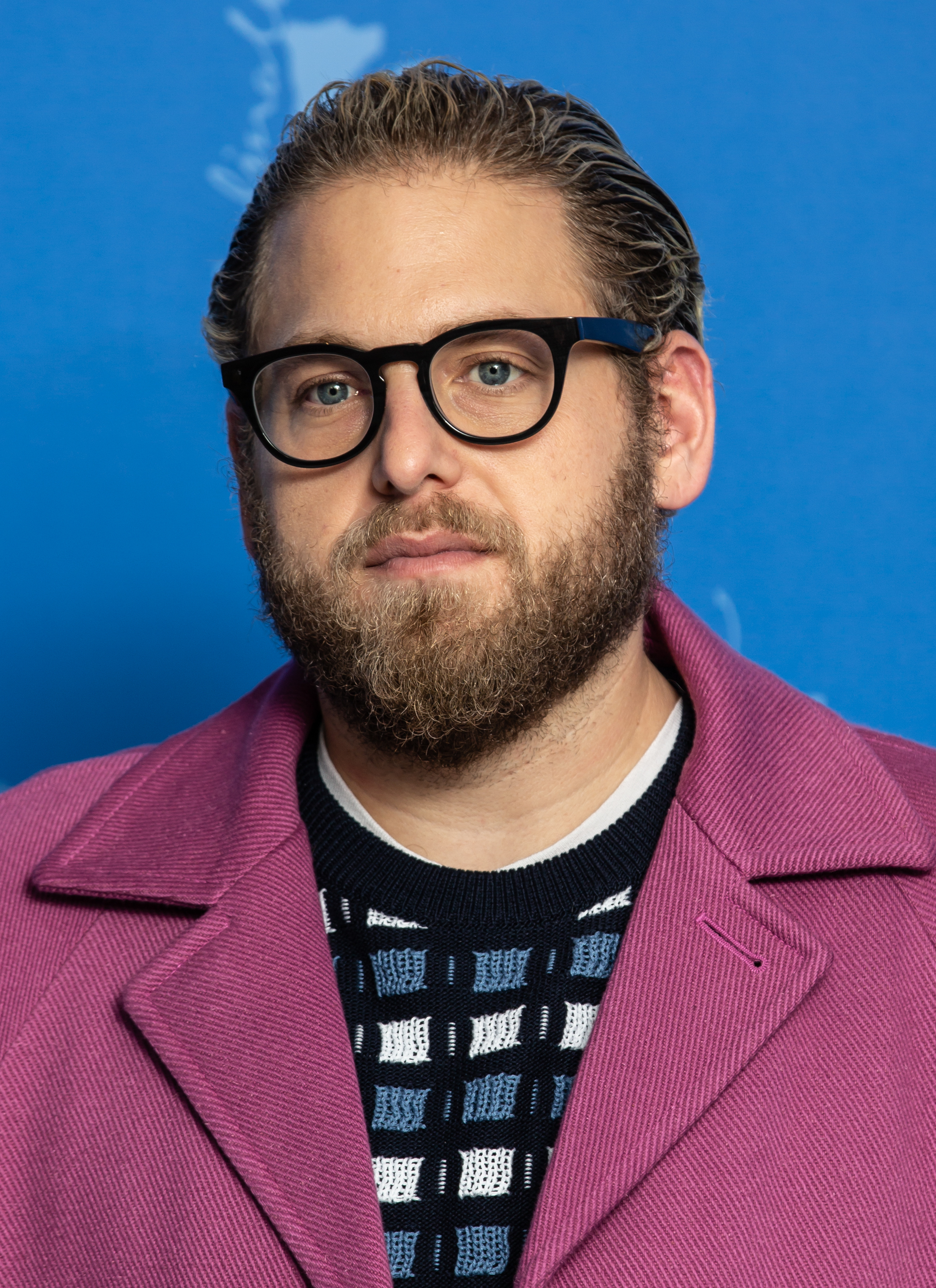
Jonah Hill, actor

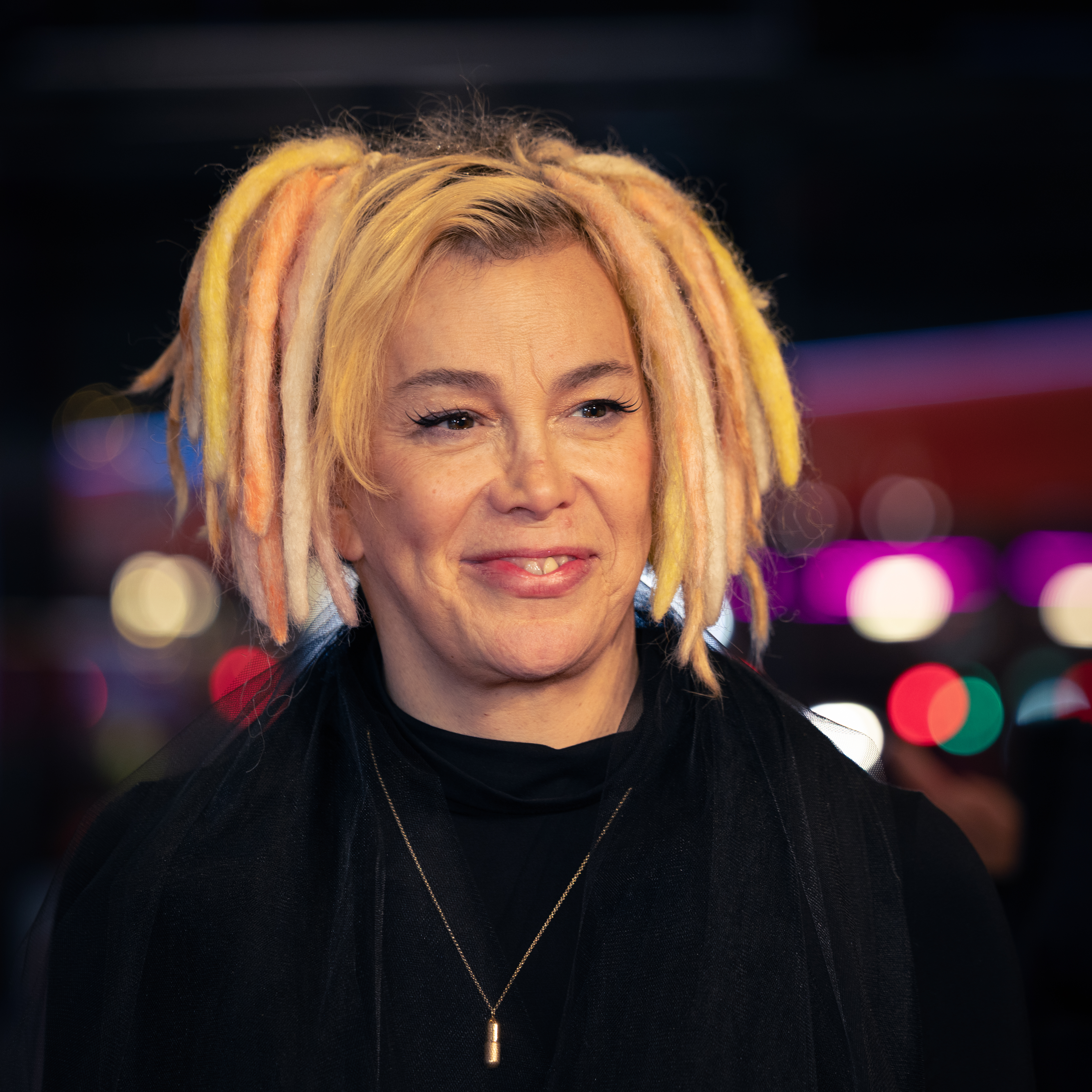
Lana Wachowski, filmmaker

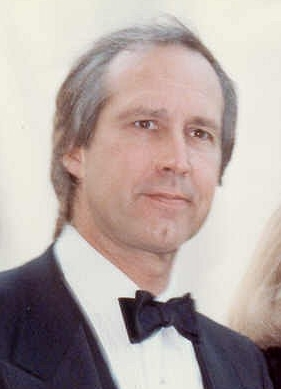
Chevy Chase, actor

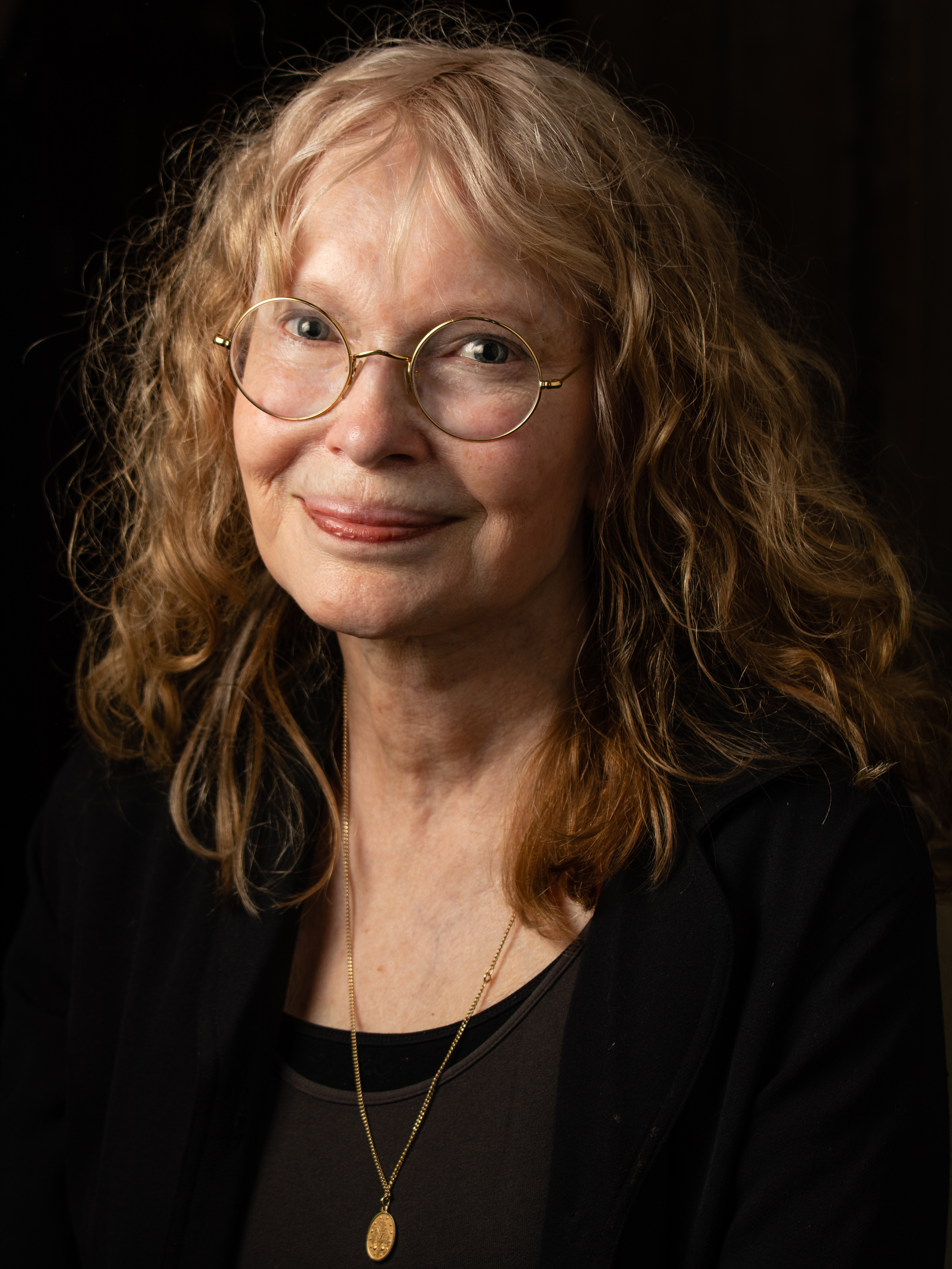
Mia Farrow, actress

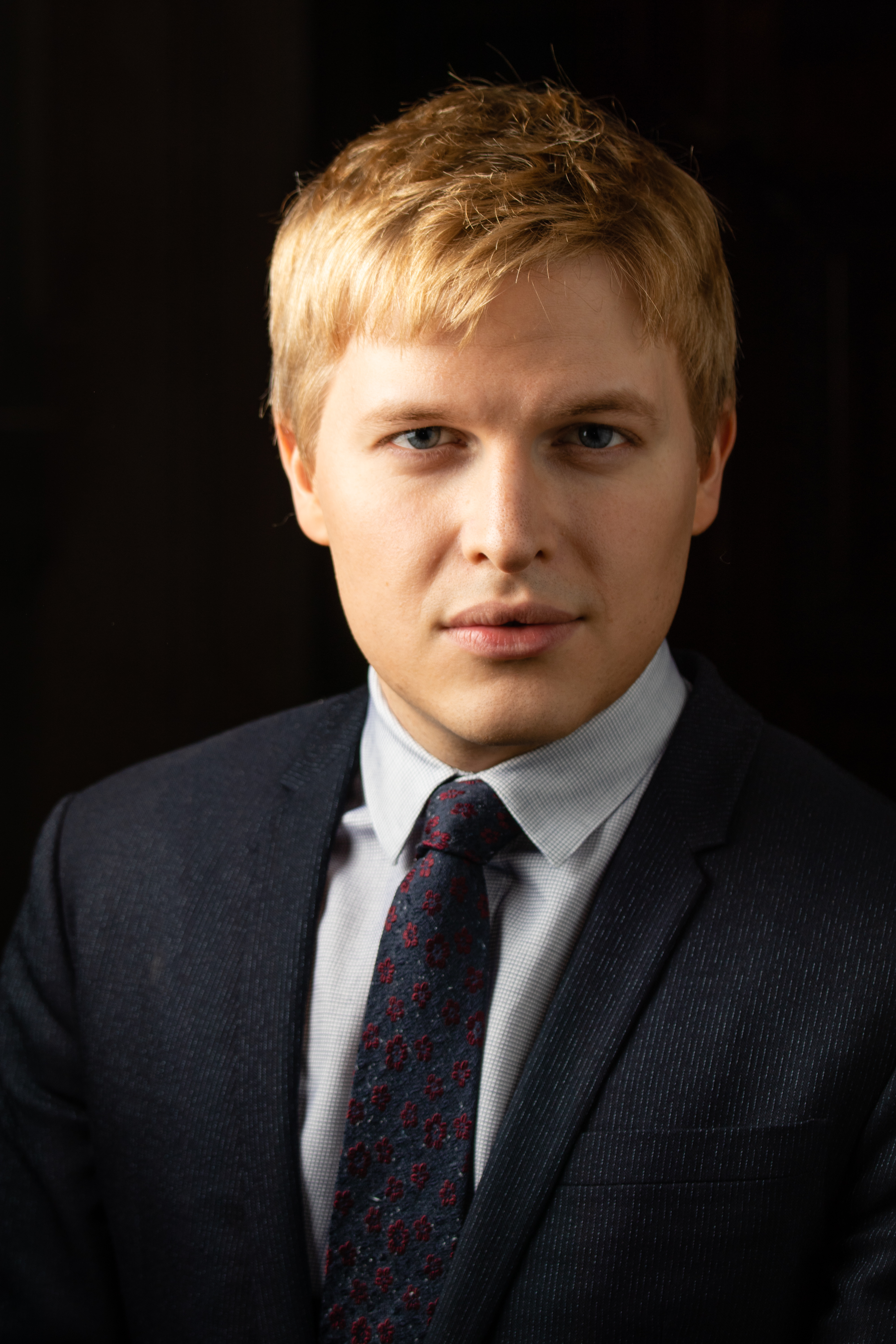
Ronan Farrow, journalist

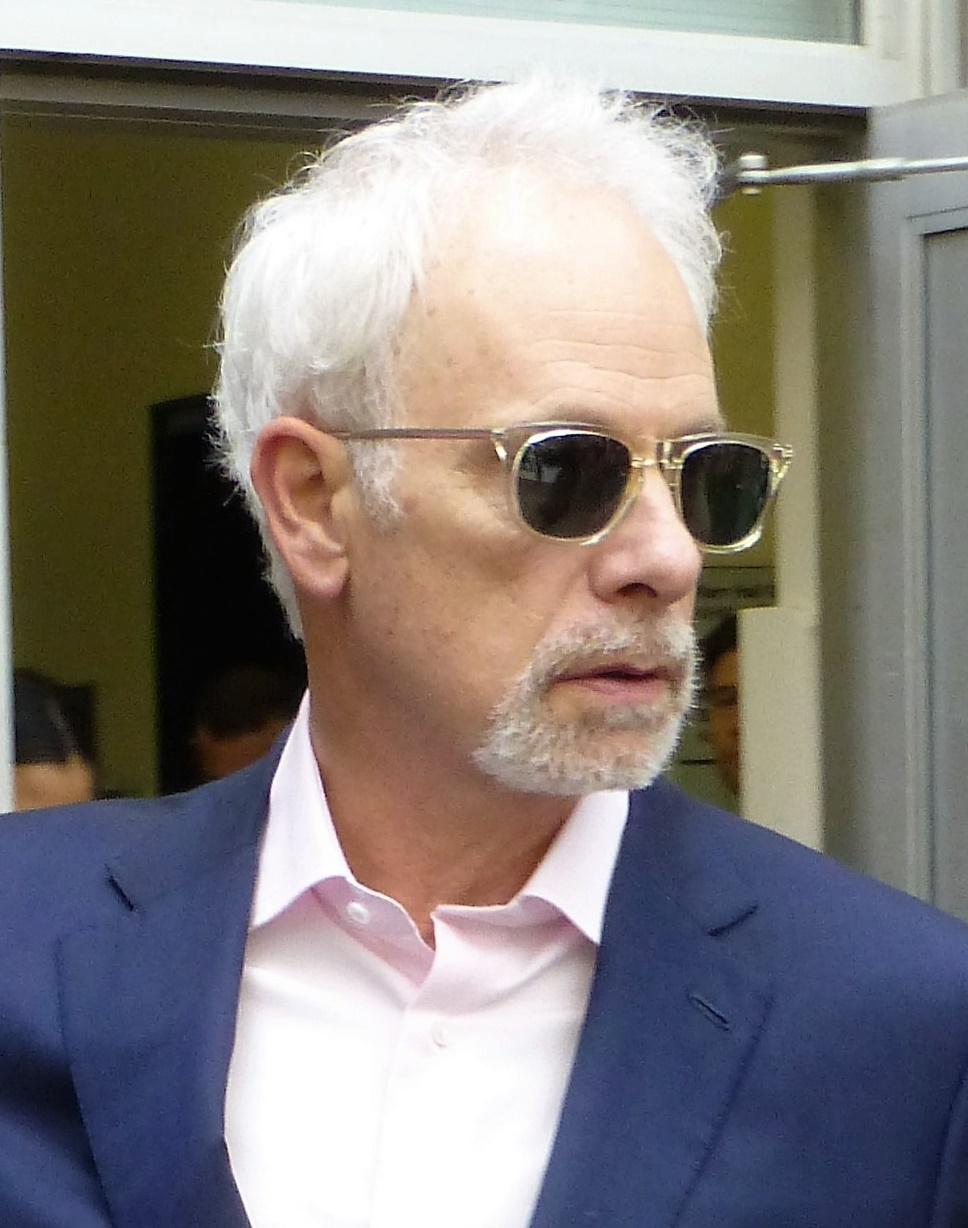
Christopher Guest, film director

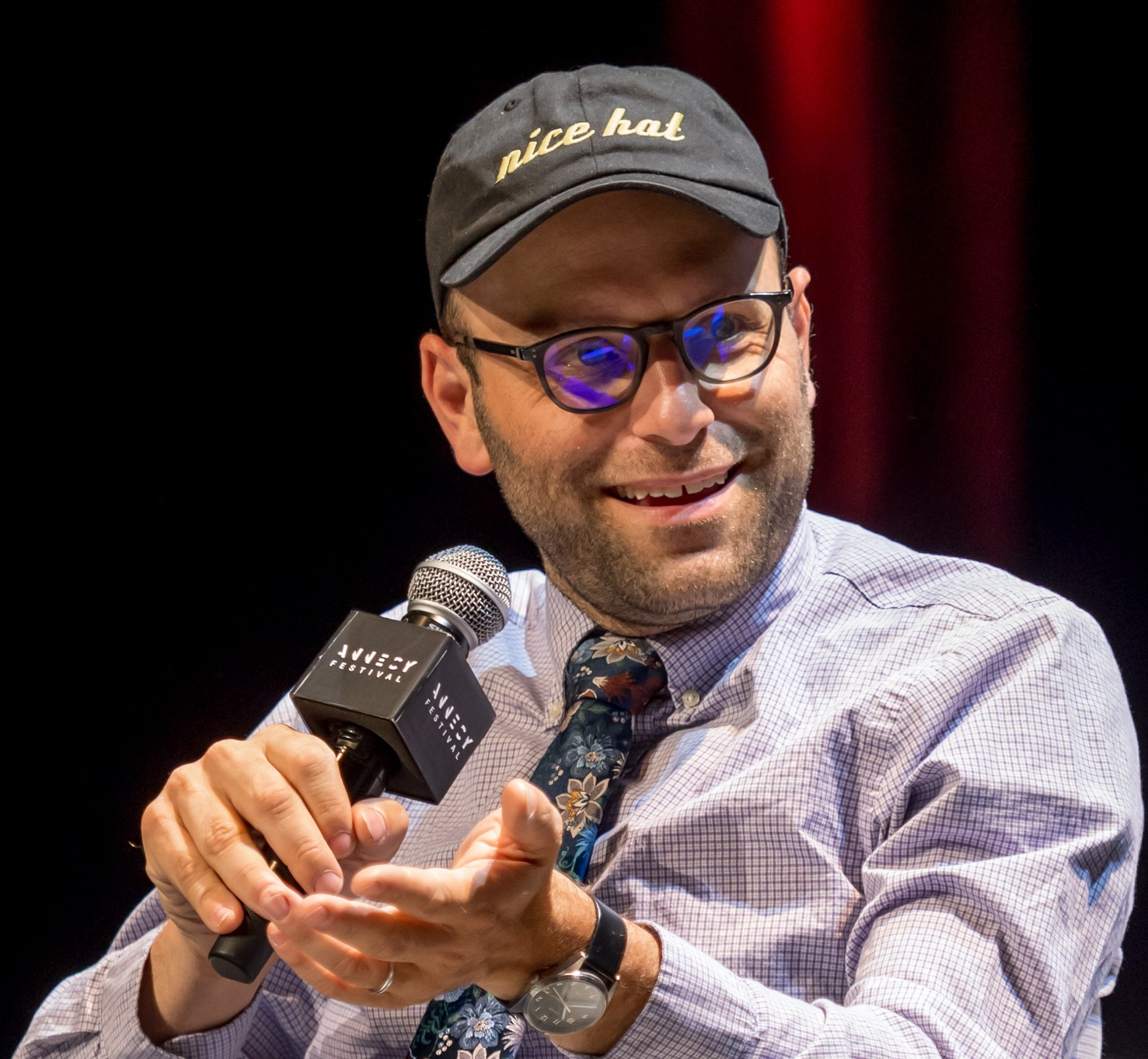
Raphael Bob-Waksberg, television producer

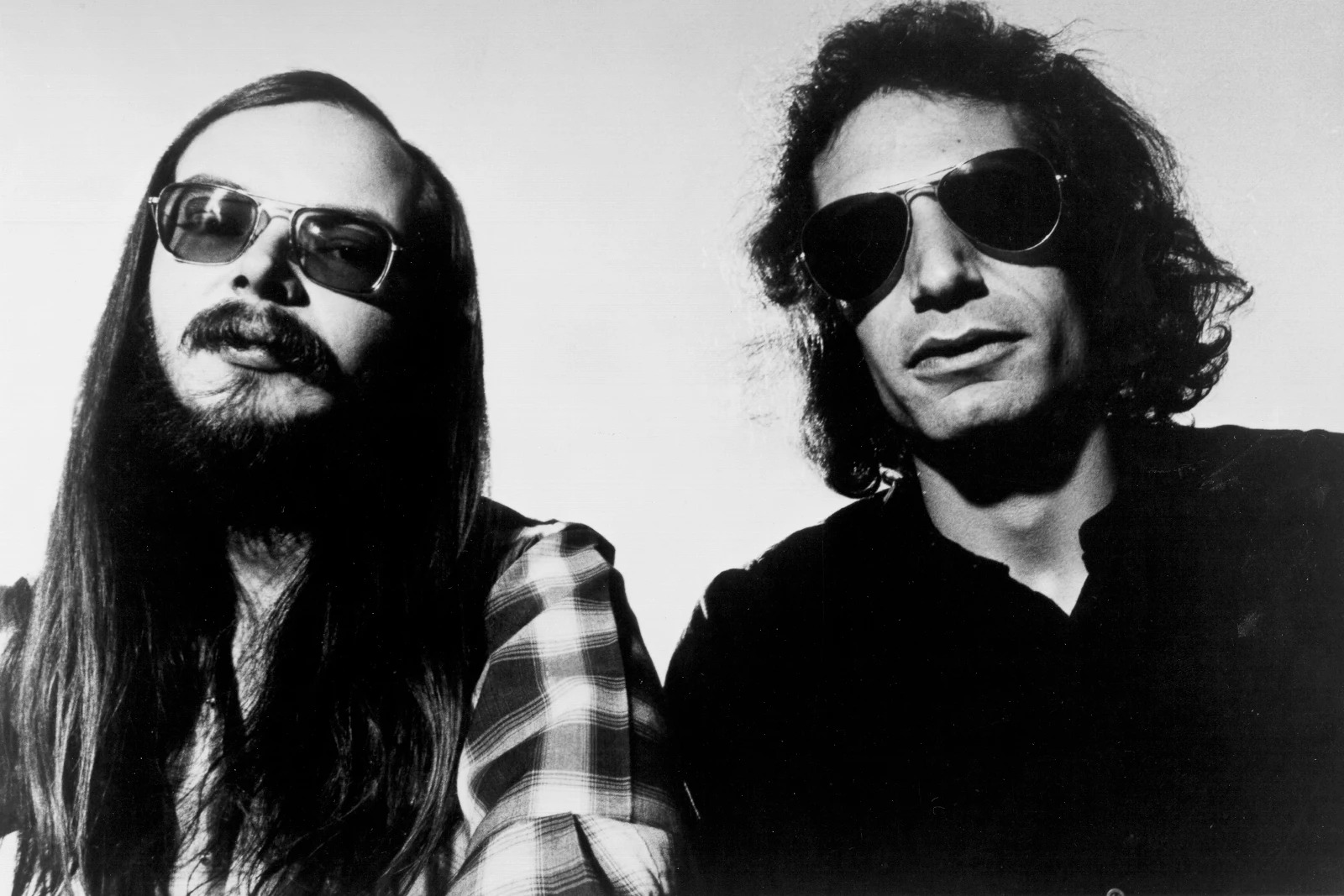
Steely Dan, rock band

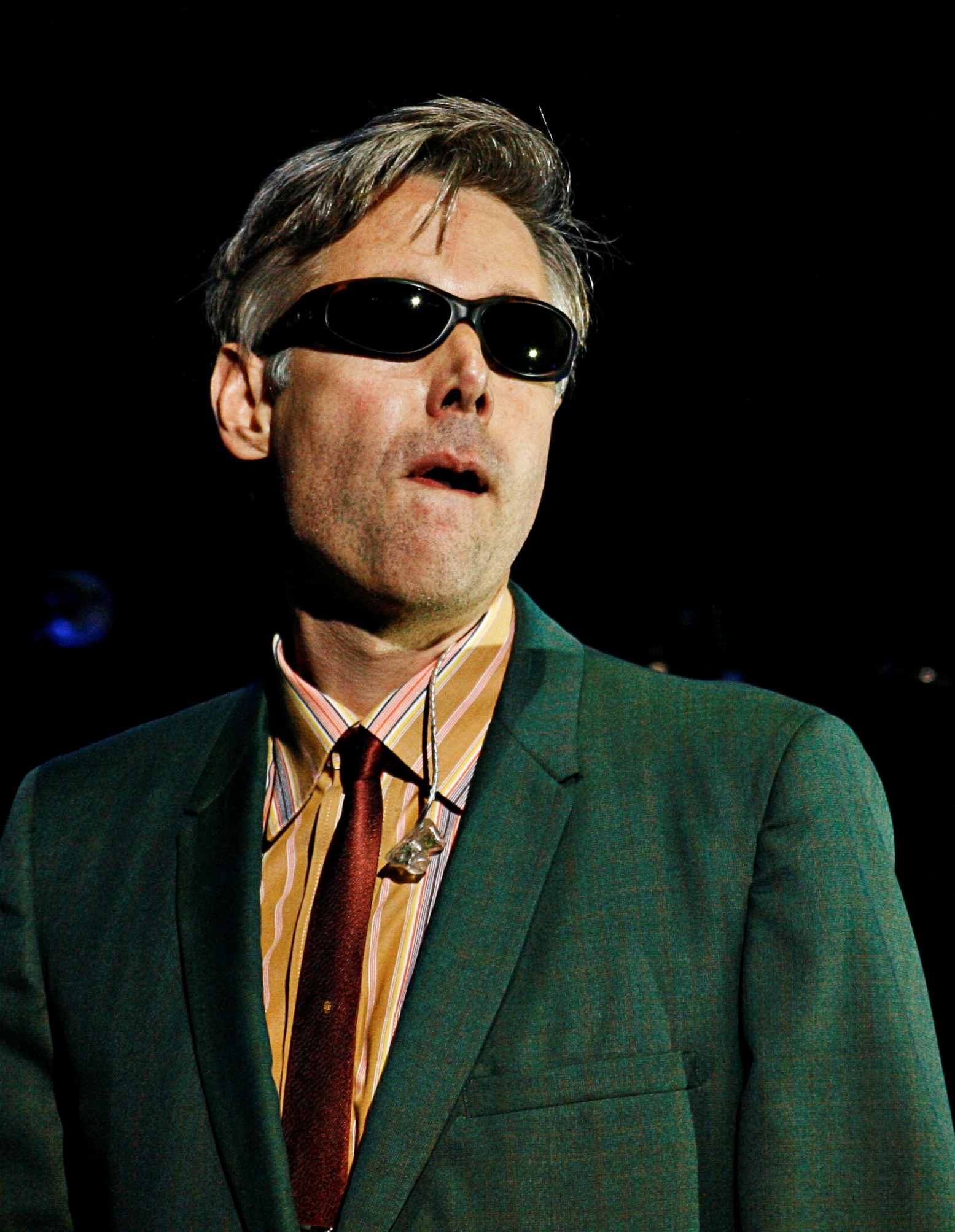
Adam Yauch, musician

=== Notable current faculty ===
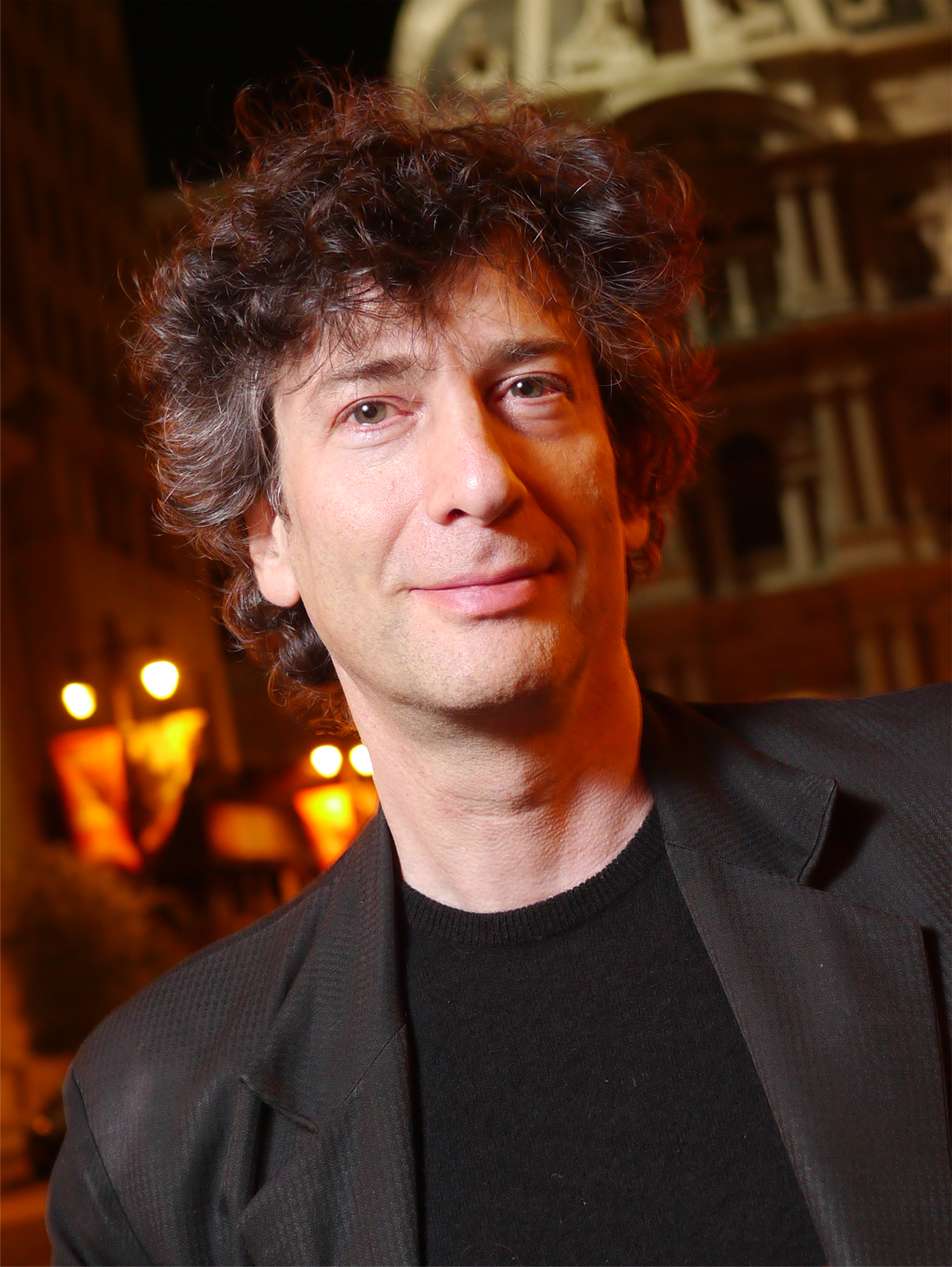
Neil Gaiman, writer

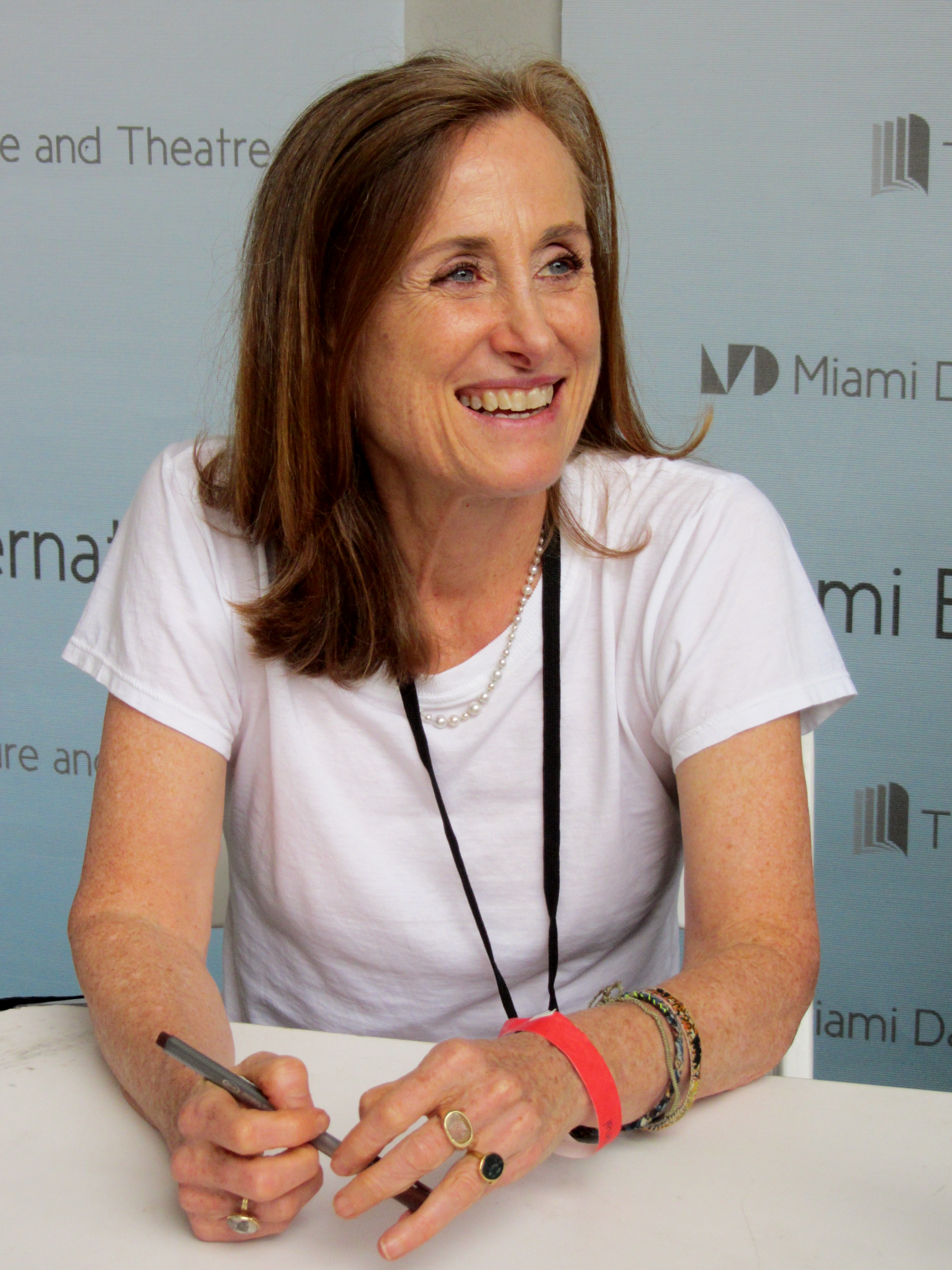
Mona Simpson, novelist

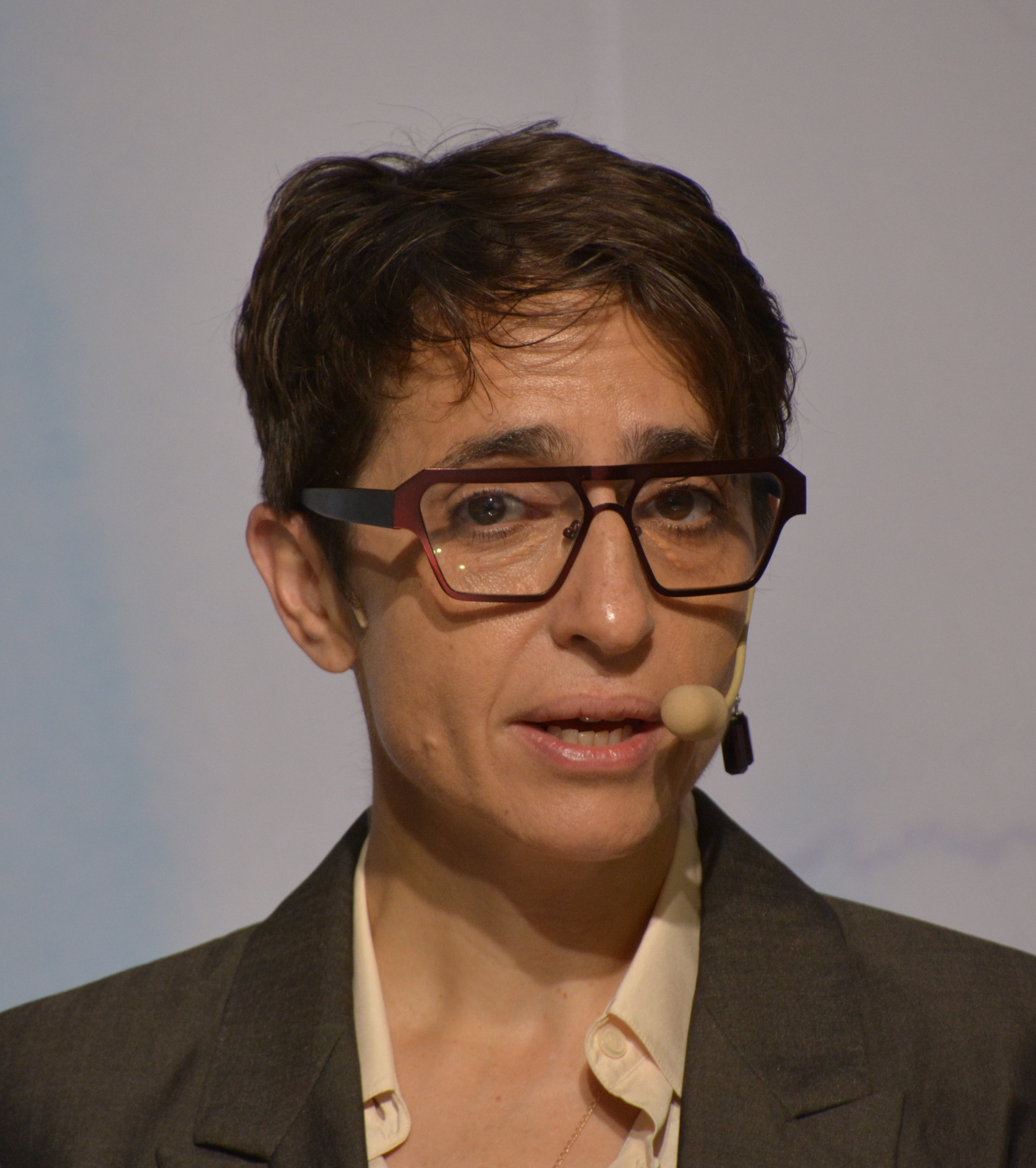
M. Gessen, journalist and activist

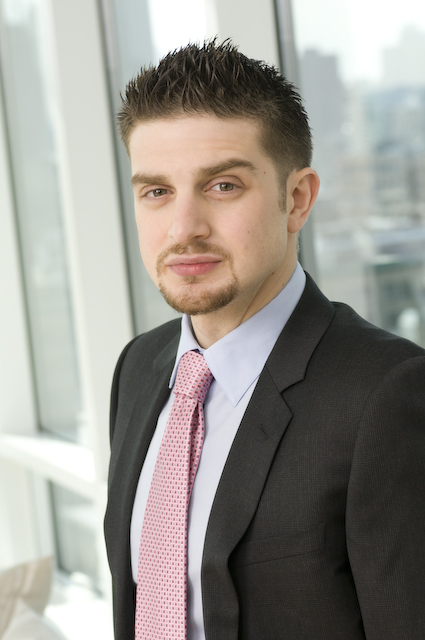
Alexander Soros, philanthropist

Anne Carson, poet and Nobel Laureate

Stephen Shore, Photographer

Walter Russell Mead, academic

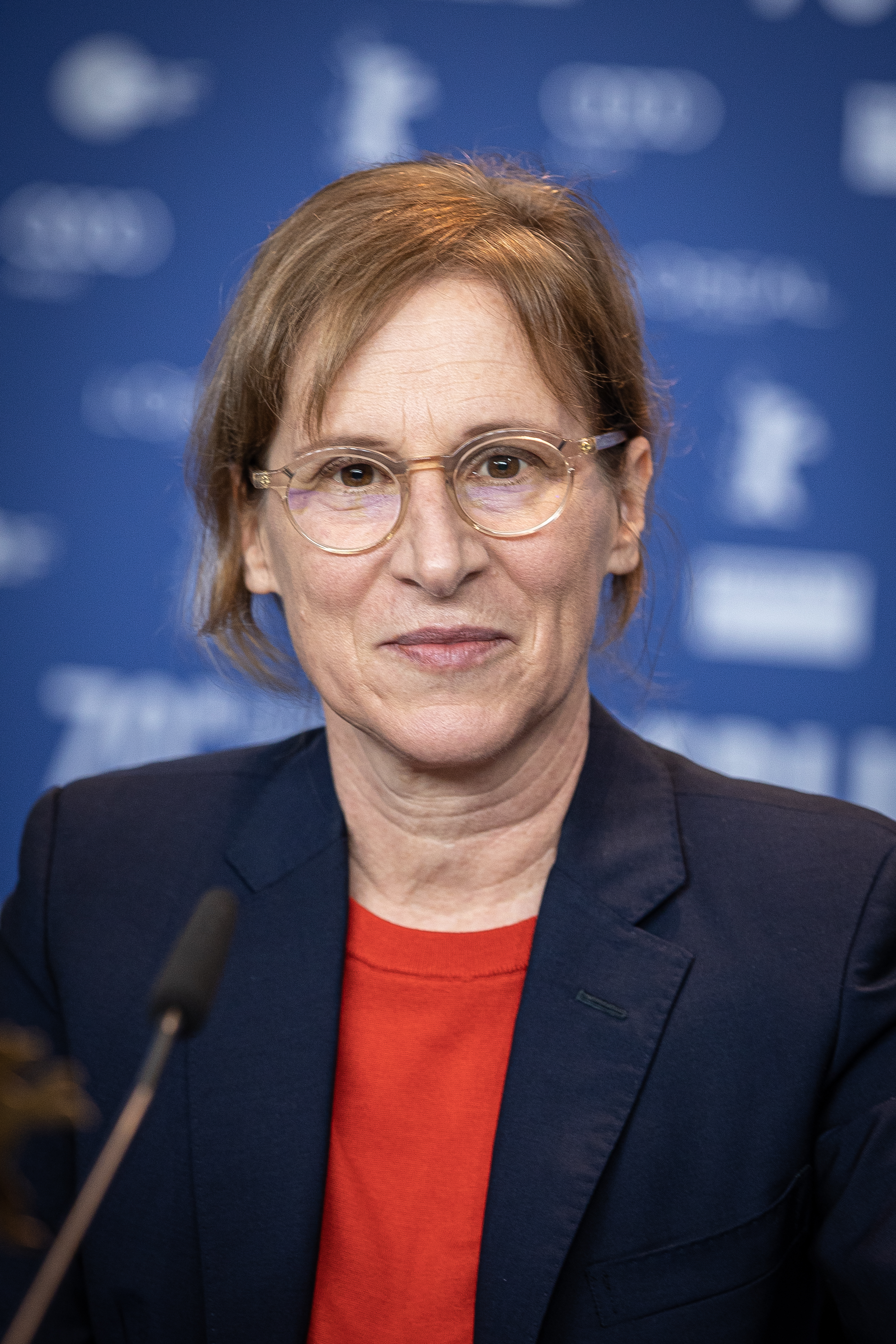
Kelly Reichardt, film director

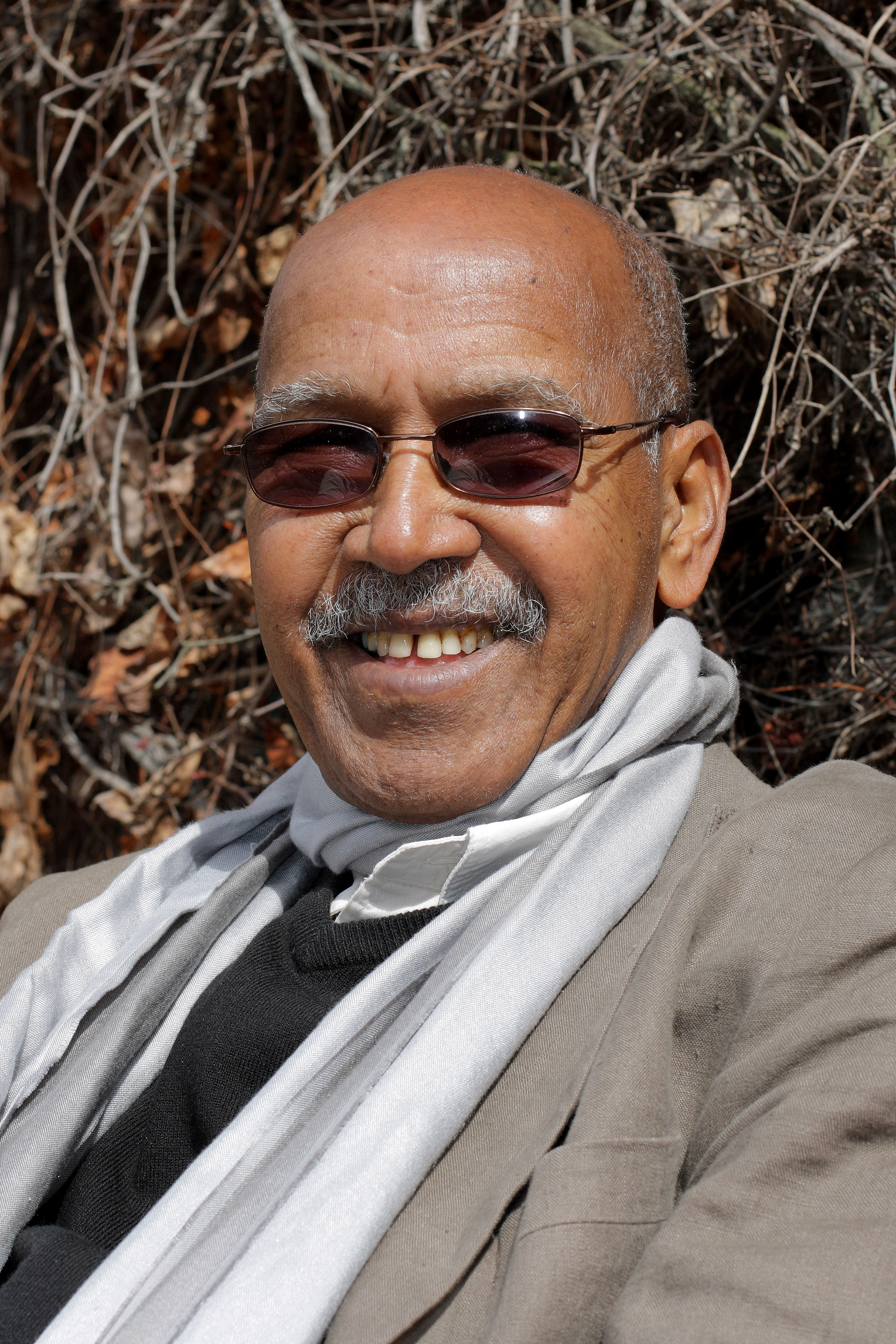
Nuruddin Farah, novelist

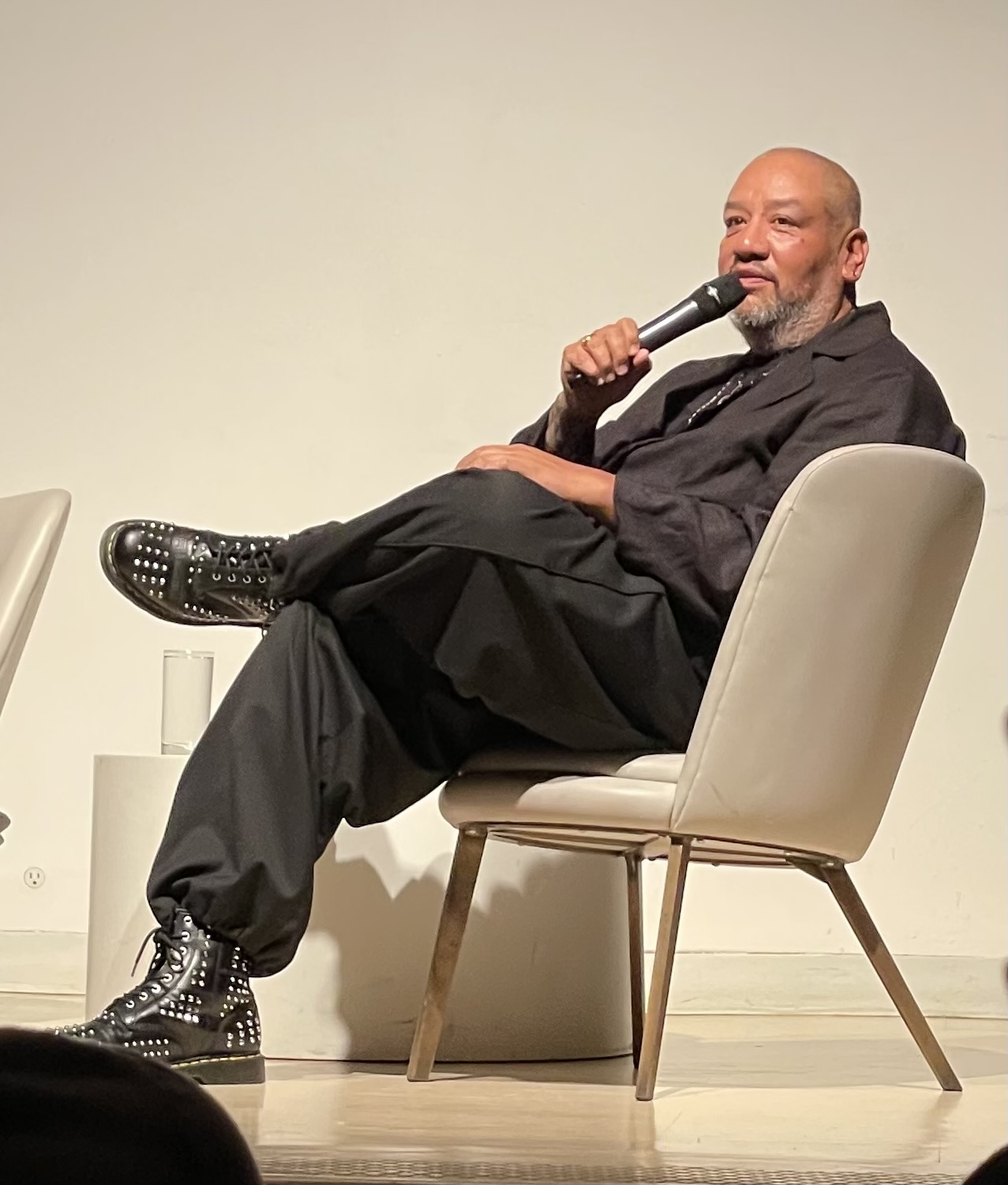
Jeffrey Gibson, artist

=== Notable former faculty ===
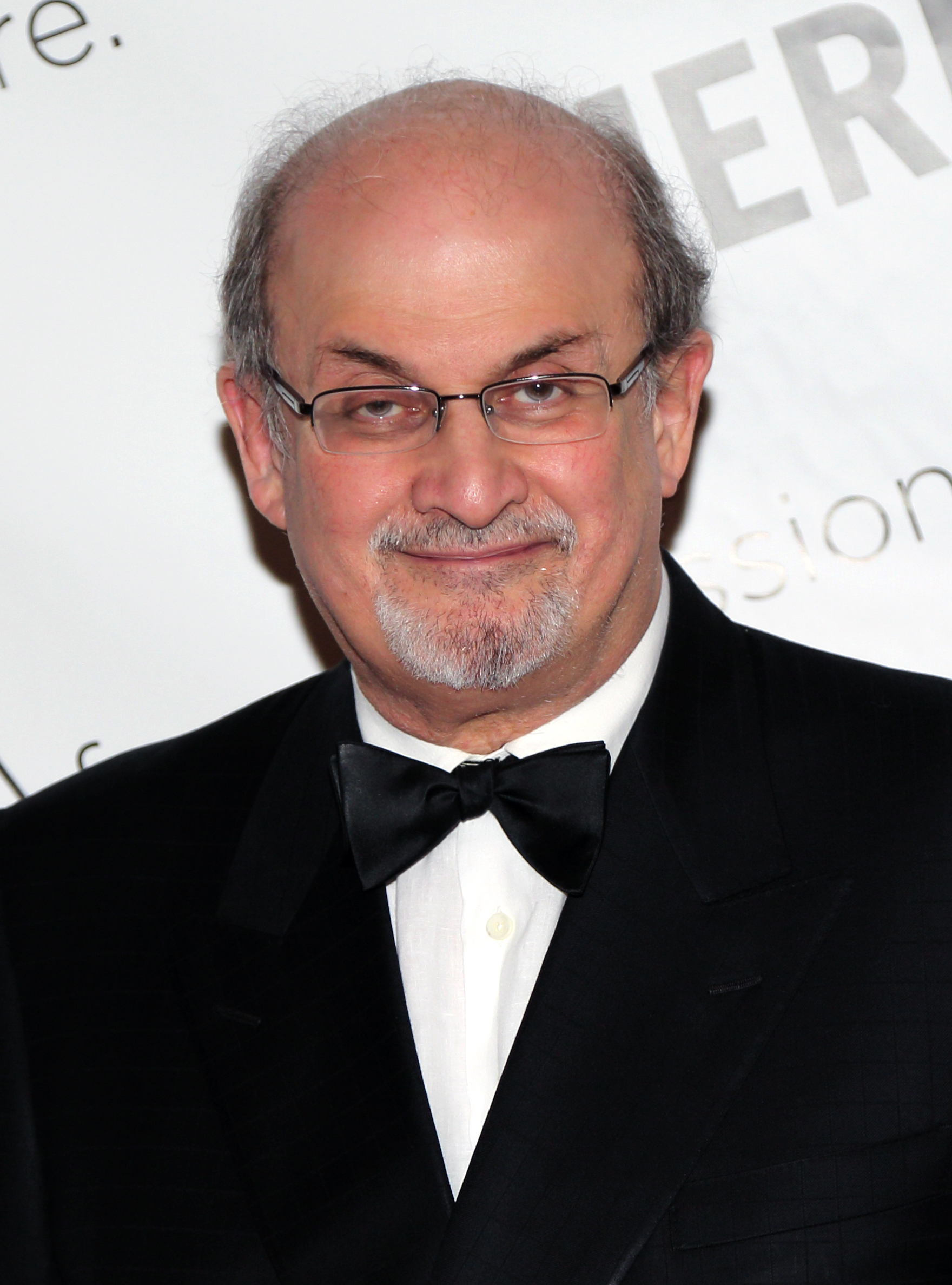
Salman Rushdie, novelist

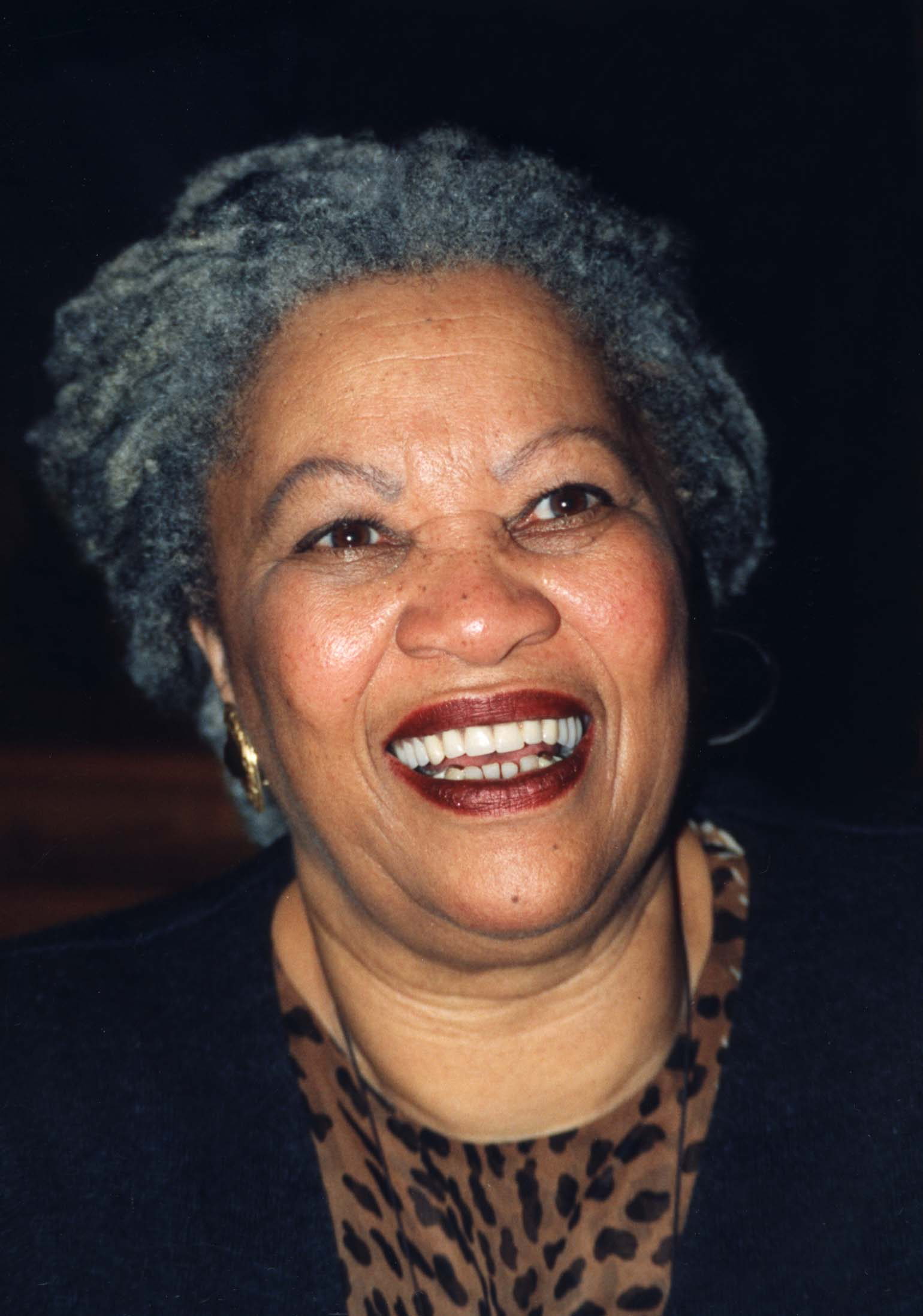
Toni Morrison, novelist and Nobel Laureate

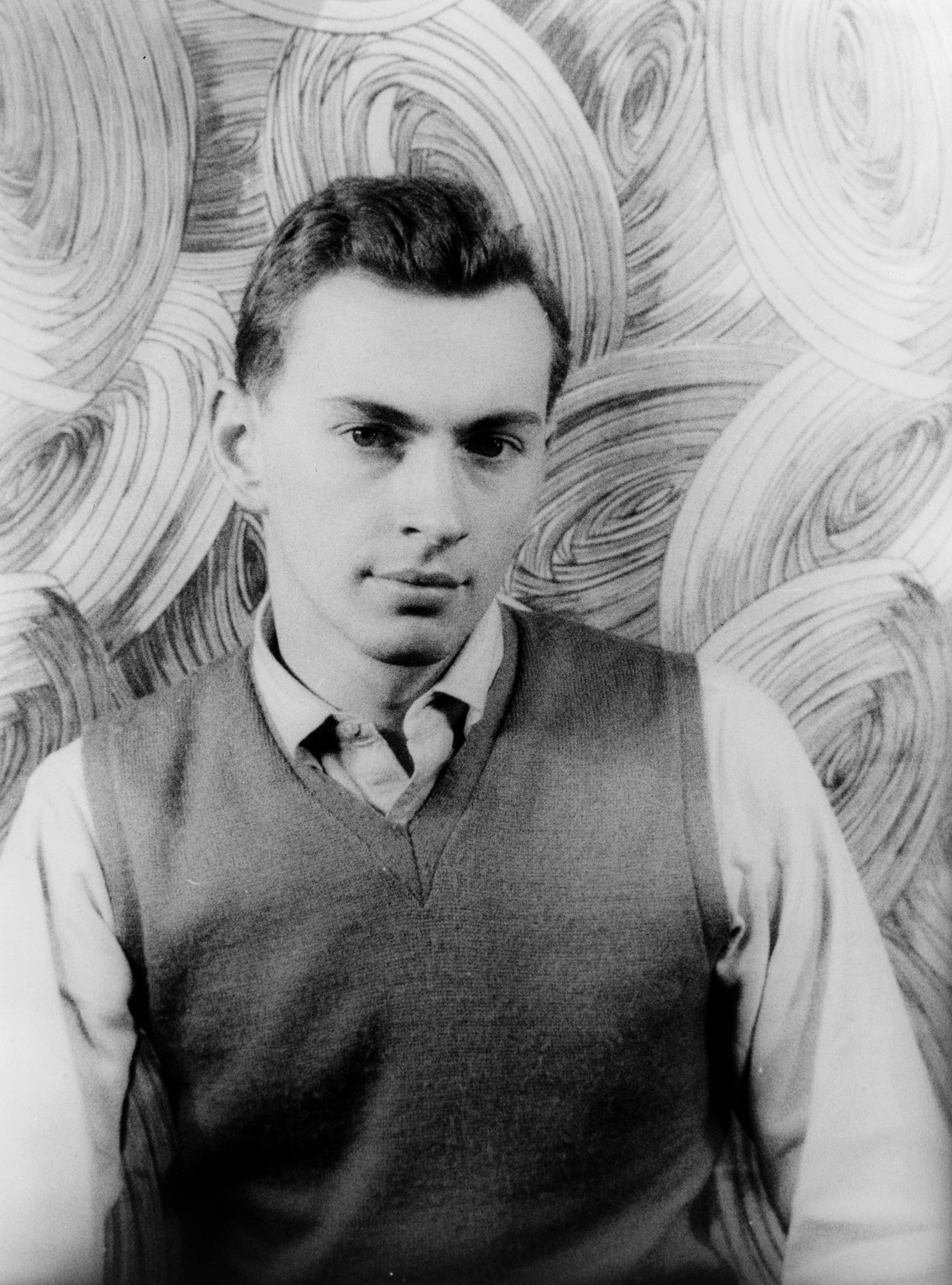
Gore Vidal, writer

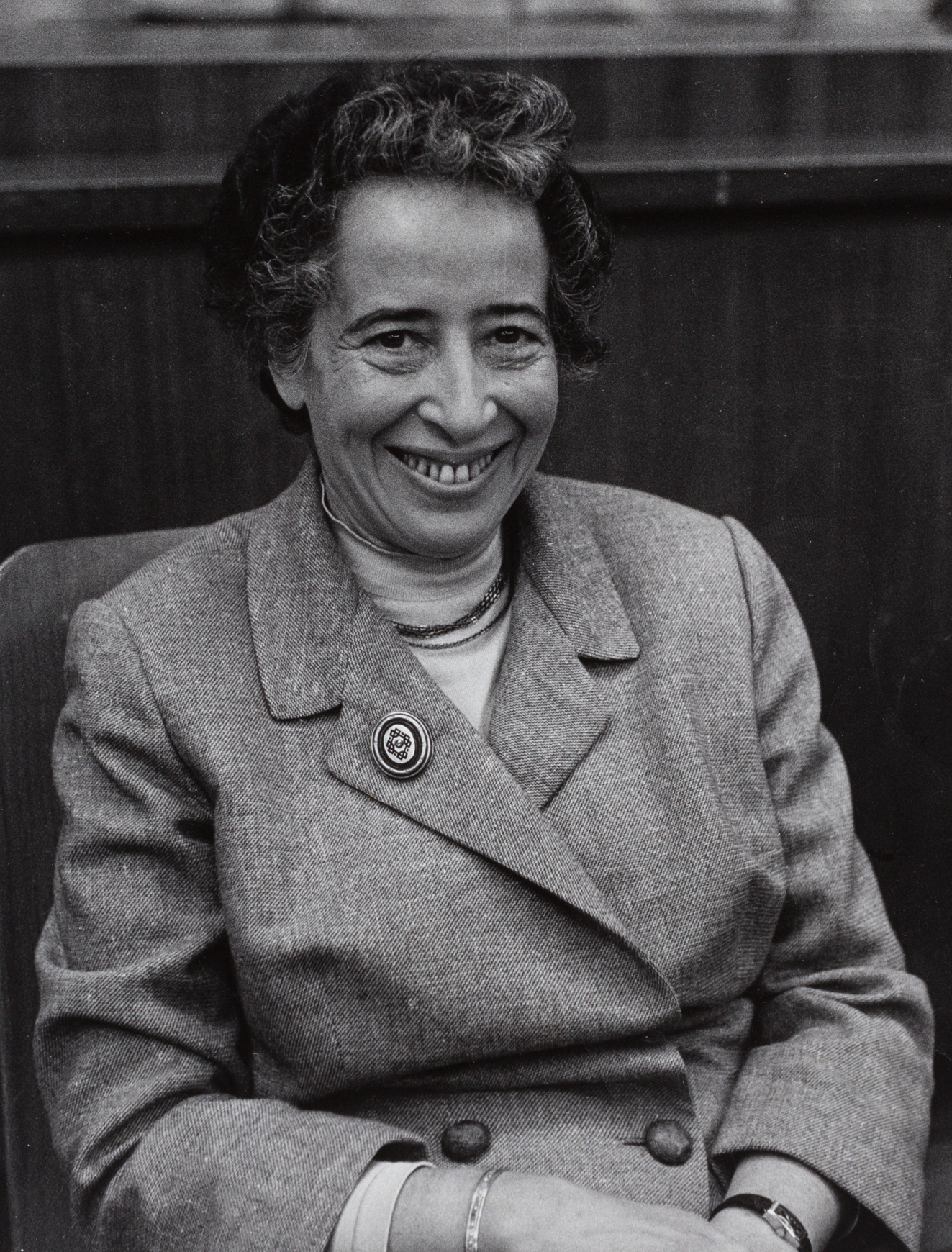
Hannah Arendt, philosopher

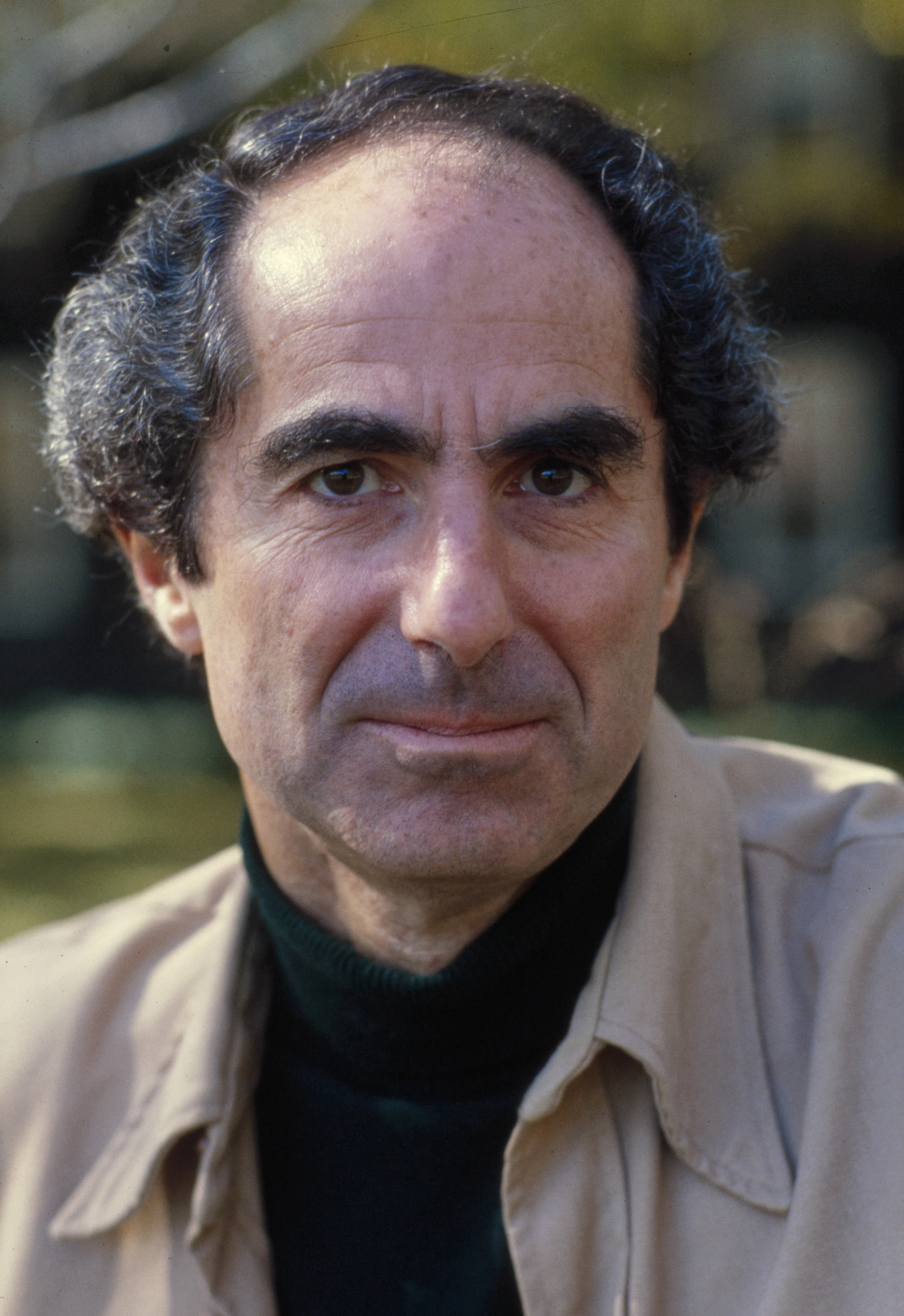
Philip Roth, novelist

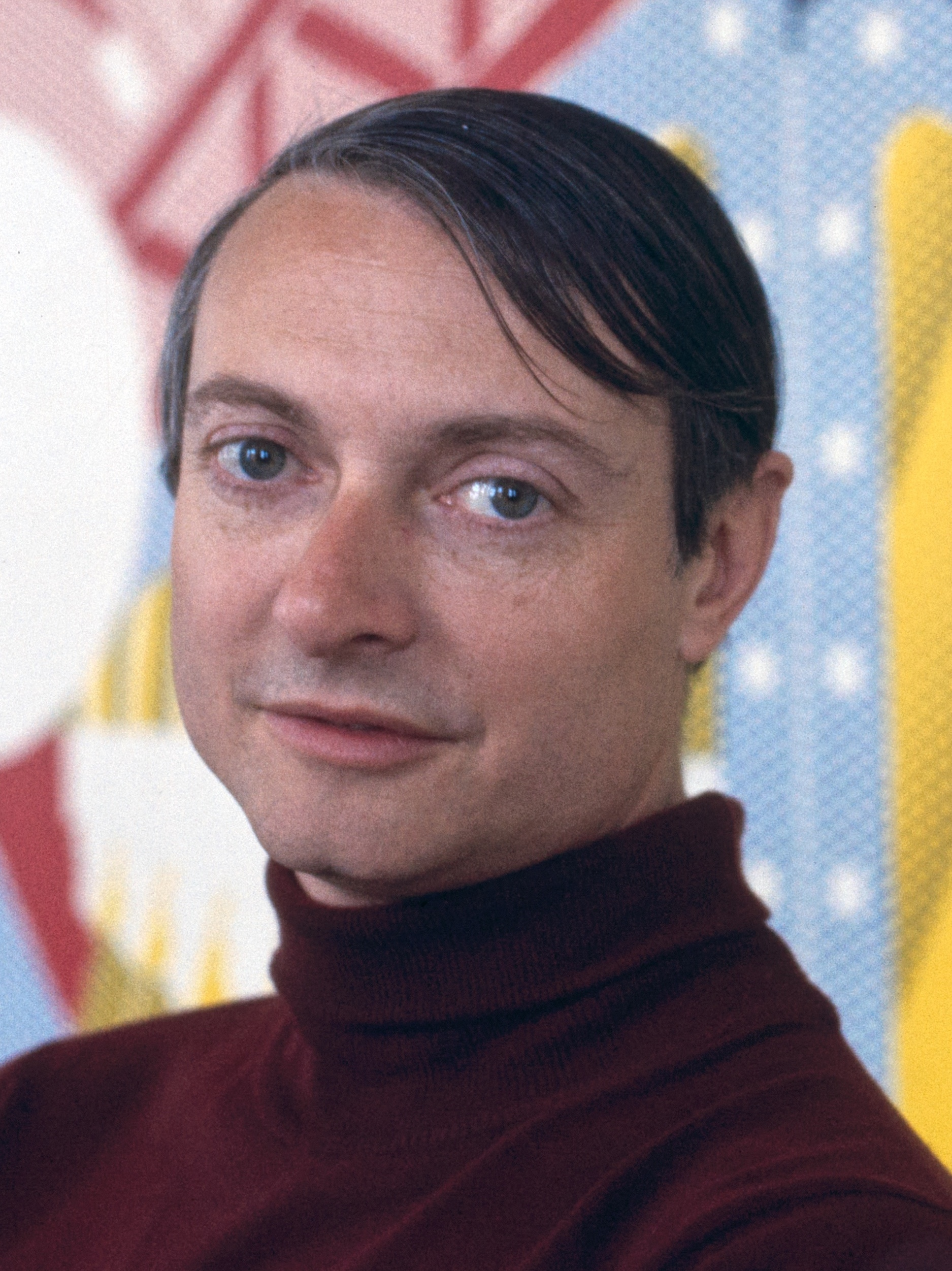
Roy Lichtenstein, pop artist

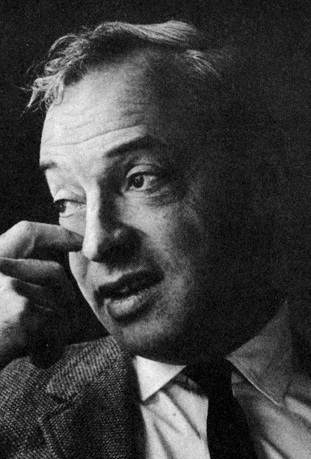
Saul Bellow, writer and Nobel Laureate

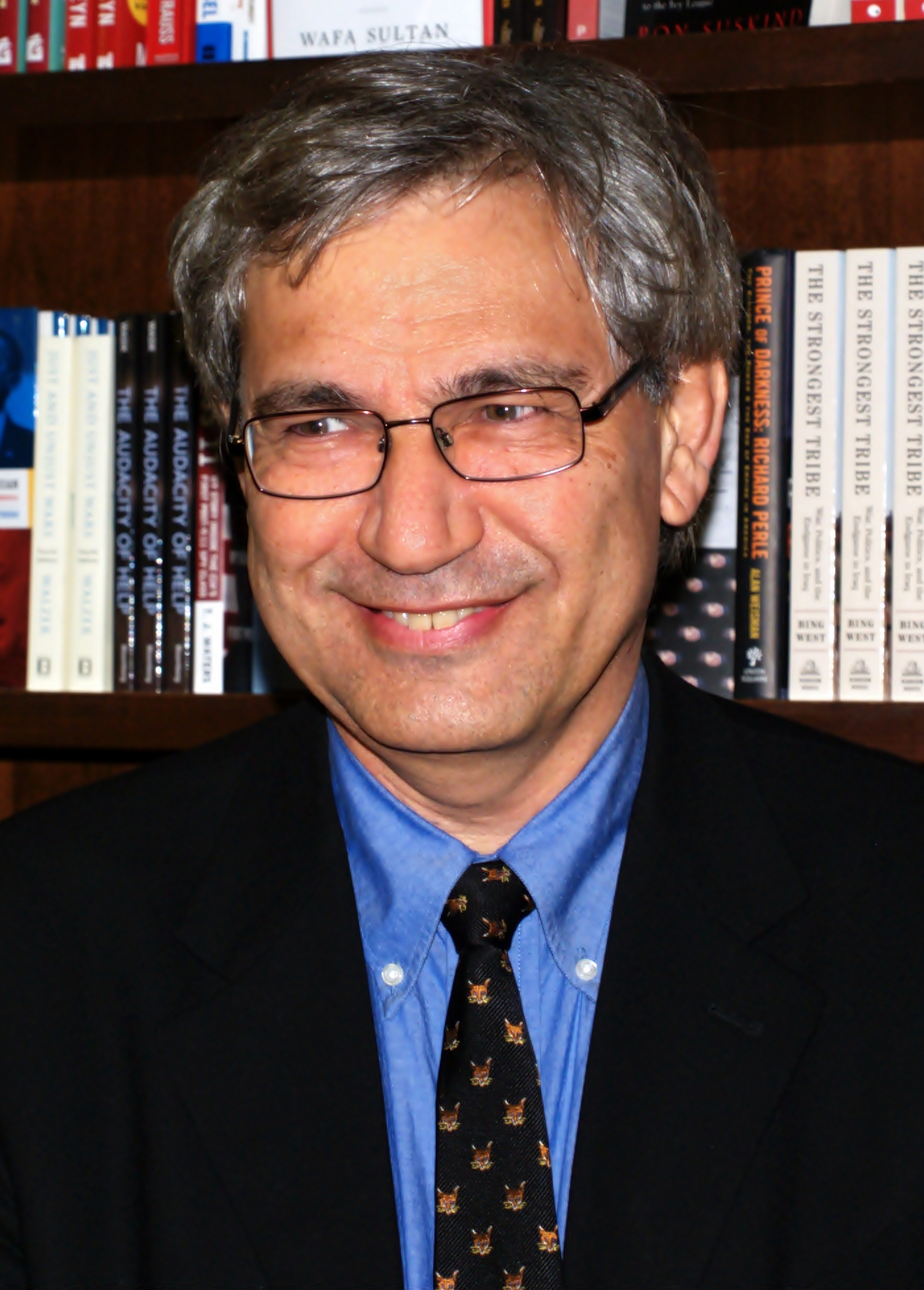
Orhan Pamuk, novelist and Nobel Laureate

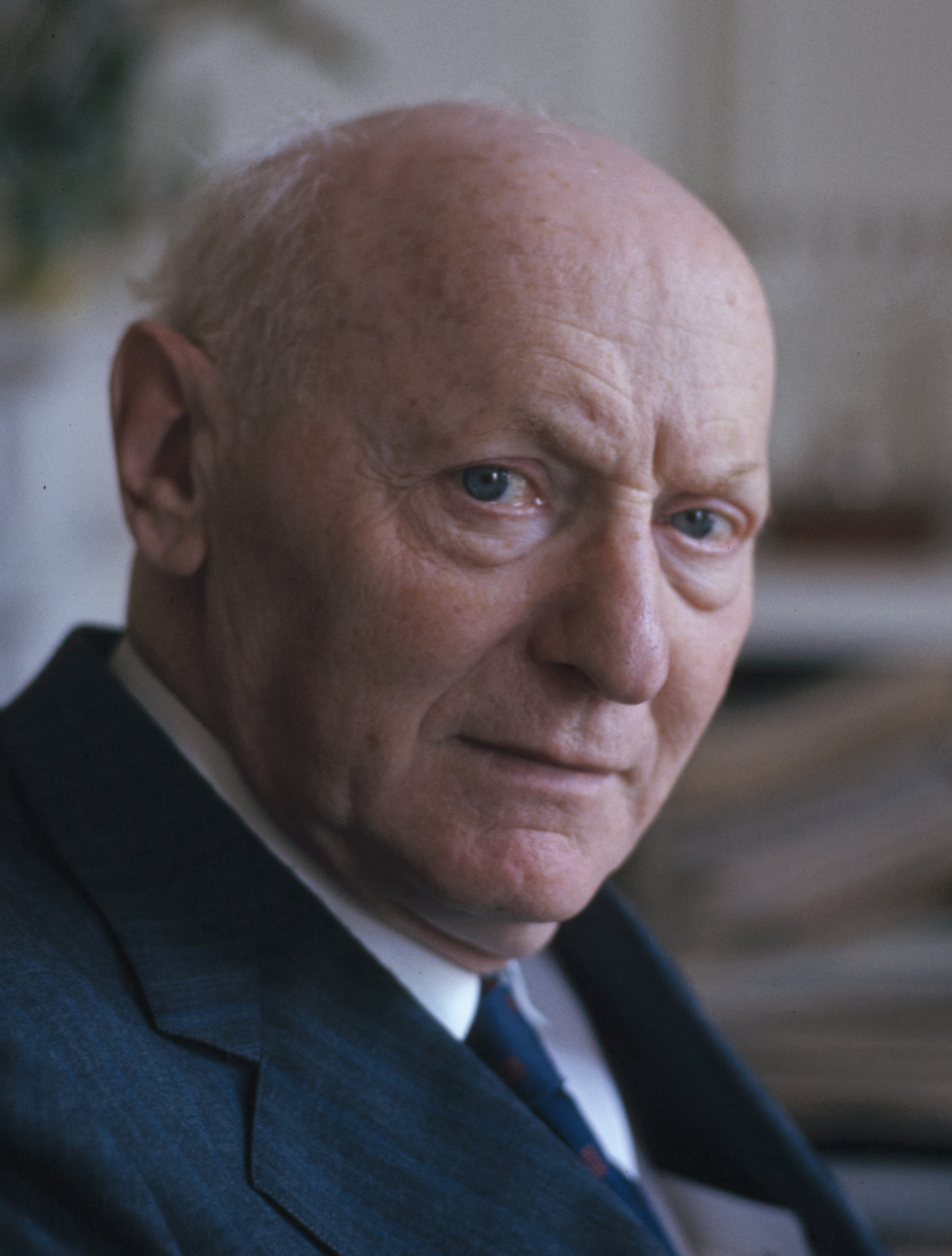
Isaac Bashevis Singer, author and Nobel Laureate

José Saramago, novelist and Nobel Laureate
