= Bob Gottlieb =

American basketball coach (1940–2014)

Biographical details
- Born: January 20, 1940
- Died: November 23, 2014 (aged 74)
- Education: Ohio State University; Columbia University

Coaching career (HC unless noted)
- 1967–1968: Fair Lawn HS
- 1968–1969: Quinnipiac (freshmen)
- 1969–1971: Creighton (freshmen)
- 1971–1973: Kansas State (assistant)
- 1973–1975: Jacksonville
- 1975–1980: Milwaukee
- 1981–1983: Long Beach State (assistant)
- 1983–1986: Oregon State (assistant)

Head coaching record
- Overall: 97–91 (.516)

Robert Henry Gottlieb (January 20, 1940 – November 23, 2014) was an American basketball coach for the NCAA Division I University of Wisconsin–Milwaukee team from 1975 to 1980, and was also the head coach of Jacksonville University for two years prior. He was the father of basketball analyst and sports talk radio host Doug Gottlieb and college basketball coach Gregg Gottlieb.

Gottlieb attended and played basketball at George W. Hewlett High School in Hewlett Bay Park, New York. He next attended Ohio State University where he was reported to have played for the Ohio State Buckeyes men's basketball team, specifically the 1960 NCAA Division I championship team, although he does not appear in the statistical record of the program or on the roster of the championship team.

In 1967, after coaching high school basketball for two years in Ohio and one in California, Gottlieb was named the basketball coach at Fair Lawn High School in Fair Lawn, New Jersey, replacing future Hall of Fame coach Hubie Brown. Gottlieb coached at Fair Lawn for one season and led the team to a 7–13 record.

The following academic year, he took a job coaching freshman basketball and baseball for the Quinnipiac Bobcats. After one year at Quinnipiac, he was named the freshman basketball coach at Creighton. In two seasons at Creighton, Gottlieb led the team to a 34–6 record. After earning his master's degree in physical education from Columbia University, Gottlieb was named an assistant to coach Jack Hartman at Kansas State in 1971. He was also the head recruiter at Kansas State.

In May 1973, Gottlieb was hired as the head coach of the Jacksonville Dolphins men's basketball team. Gottlieb inherited a team which was a national power at the time but which stood to be sanctioned by the NCAA for recruiting violations. For that reason, Jacksonville's first choice for the job, Howie Landa, resigned two days after having been hired as the head coach earlier that same offseason. In two seasons at Jacksonville, Gottlieb led the team to a 35–21 record. He resigned following the 1974–75 season, however; Gottlieb had sought a three-year contract extension from Jacksonville but was offered only one additional year.

In 1975, he was hired as the head men's basketball coach and Assistant Athletic Director at the University of Wisconsin–Milwaukee. He compiled a 62–70 record (.470) in five seasons as coach of the Panthers, a transitioning NCAA Division I Independent at the time. The program moved back to NCAA Division III competition for the 1980–81 season following his departure.

Bob Gottlieb had over 100 wins as a head coach at the Division I level, including wins over Gonzaga, Cincinnati, Florida State, Auburn, Illinois, Western Kentucky, Vanderbilt, and the University of Tulsa.

After spending a year in the business world, Gottlieb and Jessie Evans were hired as assistant coaches under Tex Winter at Long Beach State. In 1983, he was hired as an assistant coach on Ralph Miller's staff at Oregon State.

By 1987, Gottlieb was reported to have entered the professional basketball world as the head coach and general manager of a planned Southern California team in what was then known as the International Basketball Association, an independent league which enforced a height limit for its players. Before the league was scheduled to begin play in 1988, however, it downsized dramatically and Gottlieb's team, which would have been called the Orange Crush, was one of at least four which was dropped from the league. What remained was renamed the World Basketball League.

For his last 10 years he operated a leading year-round basketball development program for offensive basketball skills in Southern California, Branch West Basketball Academy.

Gottlieb died on November 23, 2014, at the age of 74 after a three-year battle with melanoma.

In 2018 he was inducted into the Southern California Jewish Sports Hall of Fame.

== Head coaching record ==
Record table
Season	Team	Overall	Conference	Standing	Postseason
Jacksonville Dolphins (Independent) (1973–1975)
1973–74	Jacksonville	20–10			NIT Semifinals
1974–75	Jacksonville	15–11			
Milwaukee Panthers (Independent) (1975–1980)
1975–76	Milwaukee	11–15			
1976–77	Milwaukee	19–8			
1977–78	Milwaukee	15–12			
1978–79	Milwaukee	8–18			
1979–80	Milwaukee	9–17			
Total:		97–91			
National champion Postseason invitational champion Conference regular season champion Conference regular season and conference tournament champion Division regular season champion Division regular season and conference tournament champion Conference tournament champion
