= Deaf News =

Deaf News is an important part of Deaf literature. It reflects the current events that are relevant to the Deaf community.

== Silent News ==
In January 1969 the first newspaper directed towards a deaf audience was created. It was founded by Julius Wiggins. It was from this newspaper that deaf news was born. The paper struggled to survive, and finally ceased publication but when it was in a competition with DeafNation and Newswaves it out lived both of them. They no longer distribute to subscriber's houses but they did change into an easily accessible website called SIGNews.

== The Buff and Blue ==
The Buff and Blue is the school newspaper for Gallaudet University, a federally chartered private university for the education of the deaf and hard of hearing. It was established on November 1, 1892. Initially printed solely as a printed hard copy magazine, its current incarnation is a website that provides content covering current events occurring both on and off campus, as well as news relating to the Deaf community.

== SIGNews ==
SIGNews is a newspaper that was established in October 2003 by Communication Service for the Deaf, Inc (CSD). The reader base is typically individuals that are involved in the deaf community and the newspapers are sent to people's houses on a monthly basis across the United States. The articles are written by both Deaf regulars and guest writers and each issue has a specific topic such as Deaf education, Deaf culture, American Sign Language.

== iDeafNews ==
iDeafNews is a news website run by MSM Productions, which is headquartered in Rochester, New York. The website covers news that affects deaf individuals in the United States and provides this in five organized parts; People, Education, Communications, the Arts, and Nationwide news.

== Deaf News Network ==
Deaf News Network (DNN) is a news channel that focuses on select local and nationwide news gathered through the crowd-source method. It had a soft launch on June 10, 2013, and had its grand opening on July 4 of the same year. The channel is headquartered in Surprise, Arizona and run by two Rochester Institute of Technology graduates.

== The Daily Moth ==
The Daily Moth is a news channel created and run by Alex Abenchuchan that began airing in August 2015. The channel delivers news in American Sign Language and typically covers trending news stories with an emphasis on deaf related topics. Videos are posted Monday through Friday on the channel's website, YouTube channel, and Facebook page.

== Sign1news ==
Sign1News is a digital network partnered with CNN that offers news in American Sign Language. It offers equal access to local, regional and national news and information to the Deaf and hard-of-hearing community via a daily post-produced broadcast.
