= Benjamin Yudin =

American rabbi (born 1944)

Rabbi Benjamin Yudin
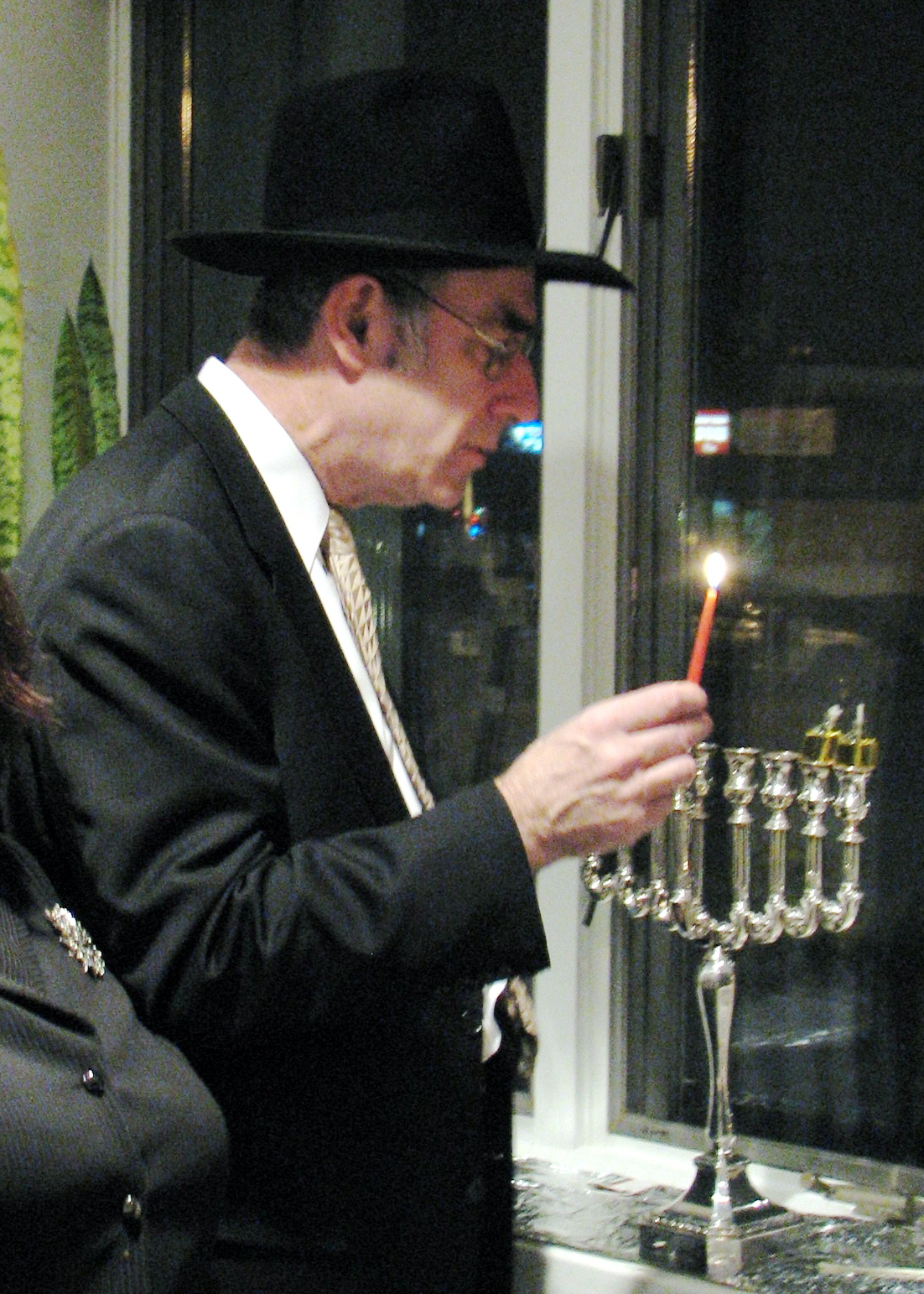
- Rabbi Yudin lighting the Chanukah Menorah

Personal life
- Born: 1944 (age 81–82)
- Education: Yeshiva University

Religious life
- Religion: Judaism
- Denomination: Orthodox

Jewish leader
- Position: Rabbi Emeritus
- Synagogue: Shomrei Torah
- Yeshiva: Yeshiva University
- Residence: Fair Lawn, New Jersey
- Semikhah: RIETS

Benjamin Yudin (/ˈjuːdɪn/ born in 1944) is an American rabbi and important figure in the New Jersey Jewish community.

== Biography ==
Rabbi Yudin lives in Fair Lawn, New Jersey, where he is the rabbi of Congregation Shomrei Torah. He is an instructor of Talmud, Bible, and Jewish Law at the Mechina program of the James Striar School of Yeshiva University's Undergraduate Jewish Studies program, where he formerly served as dean.

Rabbi Yudin received ordination from the Rabbi Isaac Elchanan Theological Seminary of Yeshiva University, where he was also awarded a master's degree in Jewish History.

== Activities ==
Rabbi Yudin and his wife Shevi are well known in Bergen County and beyond for their extensive communal and charitable work. He is a senior member of the Rabbinical Council of Bergen County (RCBC). As one of the first rabbis to serve in Bergen County, he was instrumental in developing the Orthodox Jewish communal infrastructure there, including a synagogue, mikveh, and Yeshivat Noam in Paramus, New Jersey. In 2007, he was appointed by Governor Jon Corzine to the New Jersey-Israel Commission.

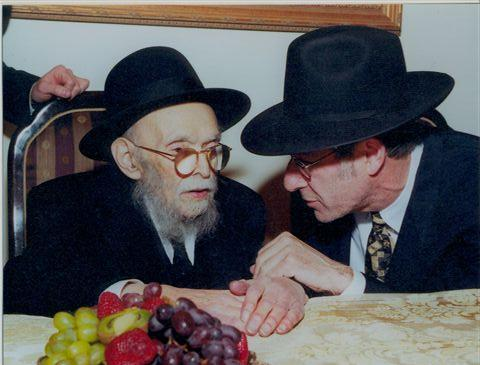
Rabbi Avraham Yaakov Pam (left) and Rabbi Yudin (right)

Rabbi Yudin gives a weekly radio address (drasha) regarding ethical messages from the weekly Parsha (Torah portion) to an audience of over 50,000 in the New York Metropolitan Area on the radio program JM in the AM on WFMU. His publications include a book "Rabbi Benjamin Yudin on the Parsha" by Mosaica Press, an introduction and explanatory essays to the Artscroll Transliterated Linear Siddur and regularly published online essays.

== See also ==
- List of Orthodox Rabbis
