= Anthony Campanile =

American football coach (born 1982)

Jacksonville Jaguars
- Title: Defensive coordinator

Personal information
- Born: August 18, 1982 (age 44); Fair Lawn, New Jersey, U.S.
- Listed height: 6 ft 1 in (1.85 m)
- Listed weight: 222 lb (101 kg)

Career information
- Positions: Safety, linebacker
- High school: Fair Lawn (NJ)
- College: Rutgers (2001–2004)

Career history
- Fair Lawn HS (NJ) (2006) Linebackers coach; Don Bosco Prep (NJ) (2007–2009) Defensive coordinator; Don Bosco Prep (NJ) (2010–2011) Offensive coordinator; Rutgers (2012–2015); Defensive assistant (2012); Tight ends coach (2013-2014); Wide receivers coach (2014-2015); Boston College (2016–2018); Defensive backs coach (2016-2017; Co-defensive coordinator & defensive backs coach (2018); Michigan (2019) Linebackers coach; Miami Dolphins (2020–2023) Linebackers coach; Green Bay Packers (2024) Linebackers coach & run game coordinator; Jacksonville Jaguars (2025–present) Defensive coordinator
- Coaching profile at Pro Football Reference

Anthony Campanile (born August 18, 1982) is an American professional football coach who is the defensive coordinator for the Jacksonville Jaguars of the National Football League (NFL). He previously served as the linebackers coach and running game coordinator for the Green Bay Packers.

Campanile played college football at Rutgers and previously served as an assistant coach for the Miami Dolphins, the University of Michigan, Boston College and Rutgers University.

== Early life ==
Campanile grew up in Fair Lawn, New Jersey and attended Paramus Catholic High School and graduated from Fair Lawn High School. Anthony would end up playing safety and linebacker for Rutgers from 2001 to 2004.

== Coaching career ==
=== Early career ===
Campanile started coaching as a student assistant coach for Rutgers in 2005. He then went on to his alma mater, Fair Lawn High School, for one season. Anthony served as offensive coordinator after 3 years as the linebackers coach and defensive coordinator for the high school powerhouse Don Bosco Preparatory High School in Ramsey, New Jersey, leading the Ironmen to NJSIAA Group IV State Championships in 2010 and 2011. Don Bosco's 2011 squad compiled an 11–0 record and earned a No. 1 national ranking in several polls, including that of USA Today.

=== Rutgers ===
Anthony returned to Rutgers in 2012, as a defensive assistant. Campanile helped coach a unit that finished fourth in the nation in scoring defense (14.15 points allowed per game), tied for ninth in turnovers gained (32) and 10th in total defense (311.62 yards allowed per game). In 2013, Campanile became the team's wide receivers and tight ends coach. He helped mentor tight end, Tyler Kroft to SI.com Honorable Mention All-American and First Team All-American Athletic Conference. Kroft led the team in receiving yards (573) and receptions (43). Kroft was the only Scarlet Knight to record at least one reception in all 13 games and earned John Mackey National Tight End of the Week after racking up six catches, 133 yards and a touchdown versus Arkansas.

=== Boston College ===
On January 13, 2016, Campanile was hired as the defensive backs coach at Boston College. As the co-defensive coordinator for the Boston College football team, Campanile's defensive unit ranked 65th in total defense, 93rd in total passing yards defense, 49th in total rushing yards defense, and 29th in defensive efficiency.

=== Michigan ===
On January 11, 2019, Campanile was hired by the Michigan to become the new linebackers position coach and serve as a defensive assistant. He only ended up being there for one season.

=== Miami Dolphins ===
On January 16, 2020, Campanile was hired by the Miami Dolphins as the team's linebackers coach.

=== Green Bay Packers ===
On March 12, 2024, Campanile was hired by the Green Bay Packers as their linebackers coach and running game coordinator.

=== Jacksonville Jaguars ===
On January 30, 2025, Campanile was hired by the Jacksonville Jaguars as their defensive coordinator under new head coach Liam Coen.

On January 27, 2026, following interest from the Arizona Cardinals for their head coaching position, Campanile agreed to a contract extension to remain with Jacksonville.

== Personal life ==
Anthony and his wife, Tracey, have two daughters and a son.

Campanile's family is full of football coaches, and grew up watching their father, Mike coach at Paramus Catholic High School in New Jersey for 10 years. Anthony's brother Vito is the current head coach at Bergen Catholic High School, while his brother Nunzio is offensive coordinator for the University of Connecticut Huskies. His other brother Nicky is the Head Coach at DePaul Catholic High School.
