= Garretson Forge and Farm =

- Peter Garretson House
- U.S. National Register of Historic Places
- New Jersey Register of Historic Places
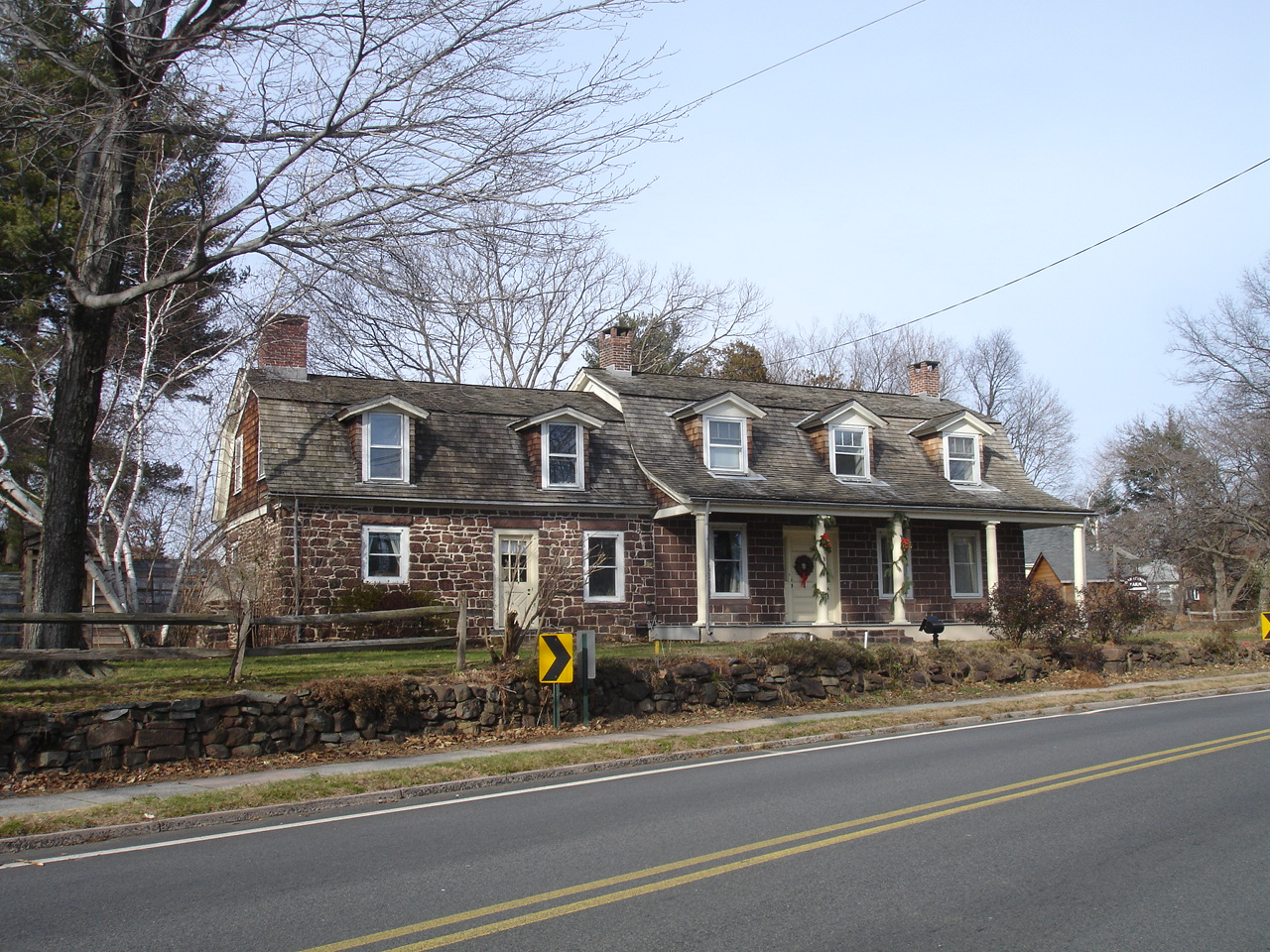
- The Peter Garretson Farmhouse in Winter 2011

- Location within Bergen County, New Jersey Location within New Jersey Location within the United States
- Location: 4-02 River Road, Fair Lawn, New Jersey
- Coordinates: 40°55′26″N 74°7′50″W
- Area: 1.8 acres (0.73 ha)
- Built: 1720
- MPS: Stone Houses of Bergen County TR
- NRHP reference No.: 74001153
- NJRHP No.: 480

Significant dates
- Added to NRHP: November 19, 1974
- Designated NJRHP: October 4, 1974

Garretson Forge and Farm is a farm owned by the Garretson Family since 1719. Located in Fair Lawn, Bergen County, New Jersey, United States, it is one of the oldest historic sites in the county. The Peter Garretson House (also known as Garretson-Brocker Home) was built in 1720 and was added to the National Register of Historic Places on November 19, 1974.

== History ==
The history of Garretson Forge and Farm began during the 17th century, with the immigration of three Dutch emigres: Gerrit Gerritse, his wife Annetje Hermansse, and their son Gerrit. In 1719, Gerrit purchased a huge plot of land known as the Slooterdam Patent from a businessman named David Daniellse. This plot of land was very large, encompassing many towns that are now in Bergen and Passaic, one of these towns being Fair Lawn. Gerrit's son Peter started construction shortly after the land purchase, and the history of Garretson Forge and Farm began. Originally called "The Garretson-Brocker home", Garretson Forge and Farm housed six generations of Garretsons for over 100 years.

During its early existence, Garretson Forge and Farm was a large plantation that grew various types of crops and also housed multiple slaves. Over the years, however, pieces of Garretson Forge and Farm were sold off. Currently, the property is just under 2 acres. Many additions were made to Garretson Forge and Farm throughout the years including the construction and renovation of the main estate, which is part of the living museum. In 1902, major changes were made to the manor house, adding a second floor, outside porch, and a new roof. These 1902 renovations made Garretson Forge and Farm look like what it does today.

== Location ==
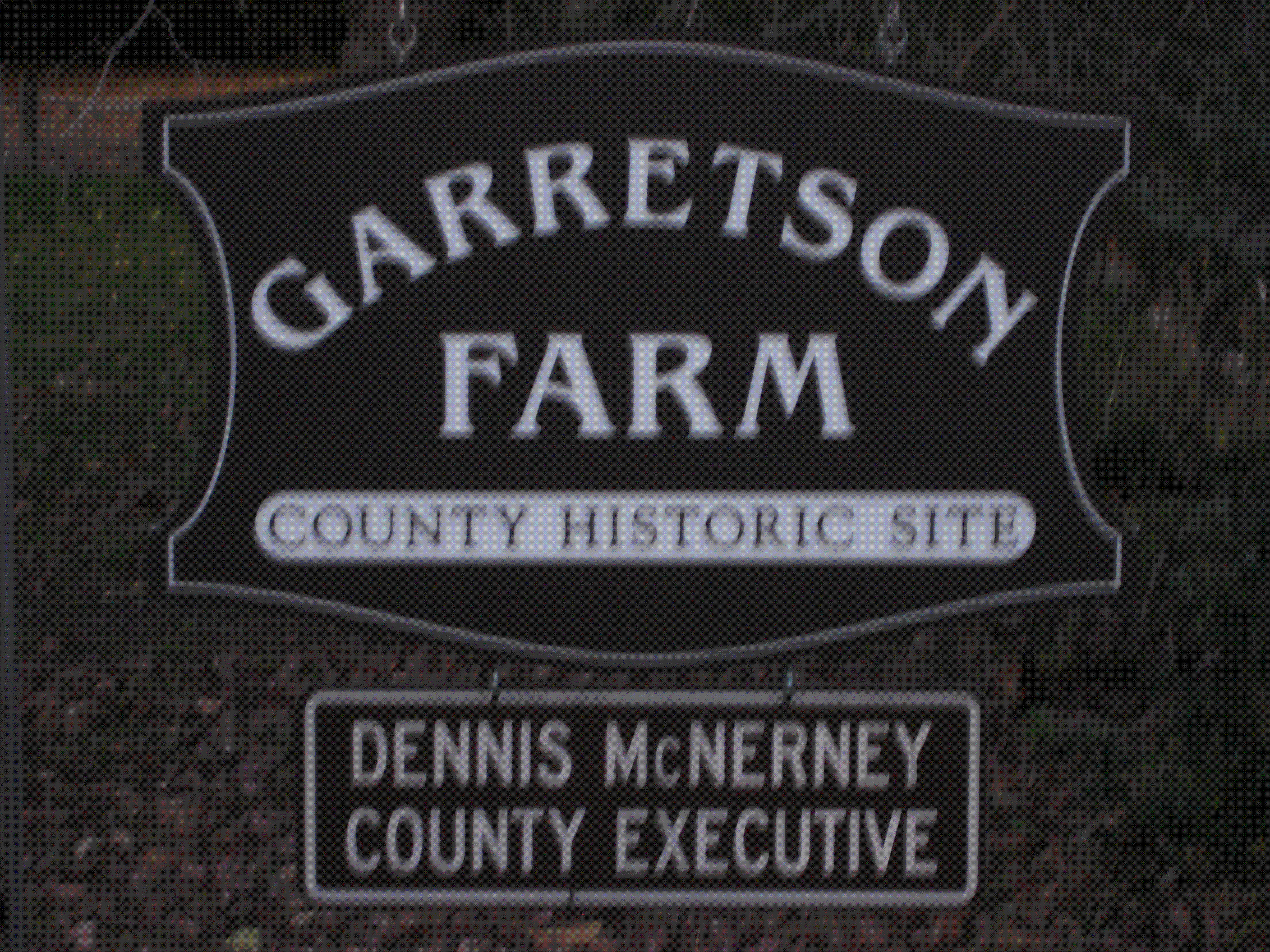
Garretson Forge and Farm Sign

Garretson Forge and Farm is located in Fair Lawn, New Jersey on 4-02 River Road. It is also in very close proximity to the Passaic River. Water from the river was used to make bricks in the early stages of construction of Garreston Forge and Farm. Numerous Lenape artifacts have also been found on the property. The region around the Passaic River was the territory of the Acquackanonk and Hackensack.

== Living museum and garden ==
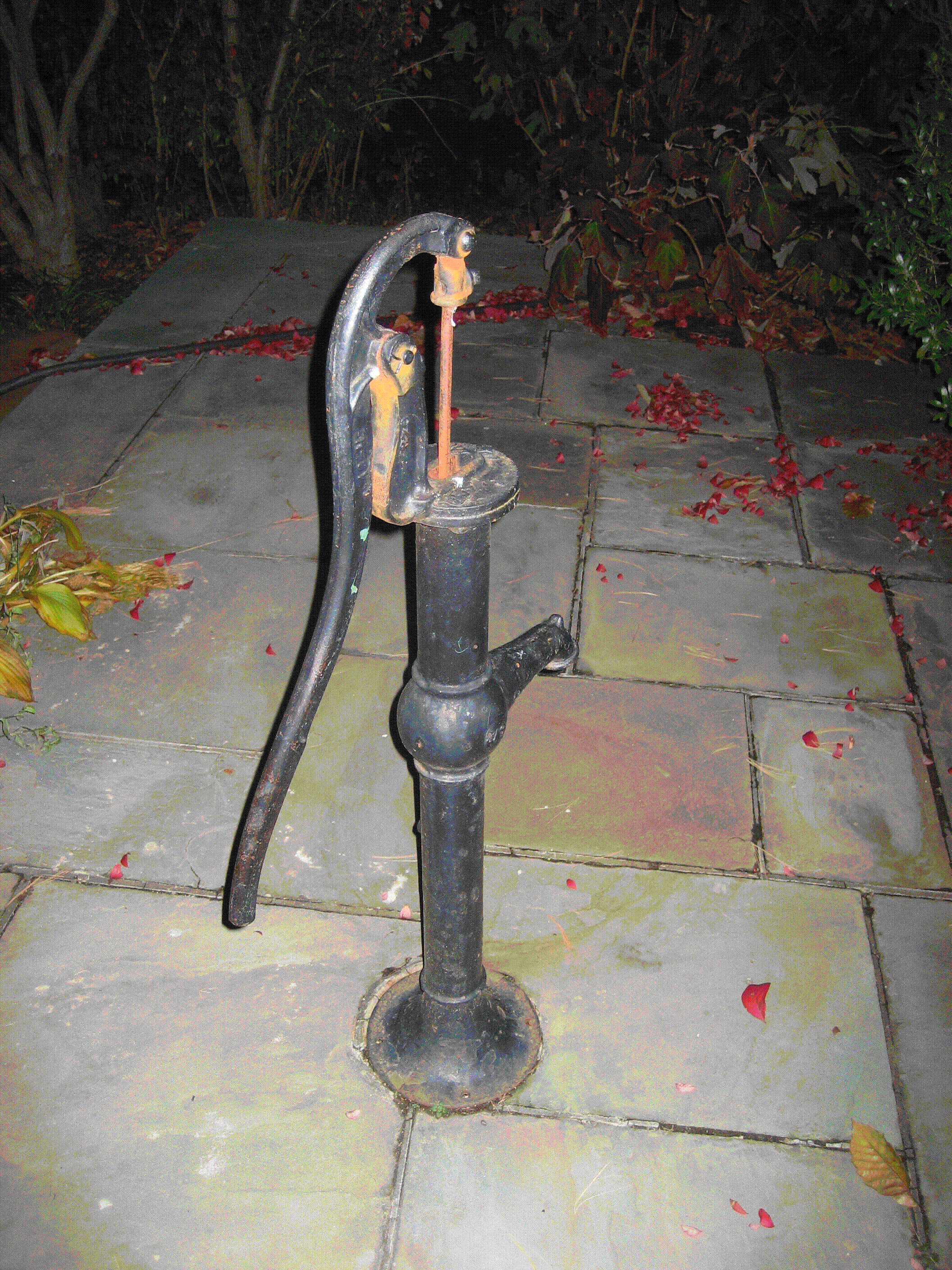
Garretson Water Pump

Today, patrons can visit Garretson Forge and Farm to explore the outdoor living museum as well as the extensive garden. The living museum contains numerous historic buildings and artifacts which patrons can explore and interact with. The main estate contains a rustic kitchen that was used by the Garretson Family. Outside the main estate, is an authentic water pump which was used until renovations brought running water into the house. There are numerous buildings around the property that are used to store farm equipment for the garden as well.

Originally, Garretson Forge and Farm was used to grow a variety of herbs and vegetables. Commercial crops were grown as late as 1970 by the Garretson Family. Currently, the garden is mainly used to grow a wide a variety of herbs. The garden consists of over 50 herbs and spices, and also contains a butterfly garden and fruit orchard. Patrons who come to visit can participate in the cultivation and upkeep of the Garretson Forge and Farm garden.

== Community ==
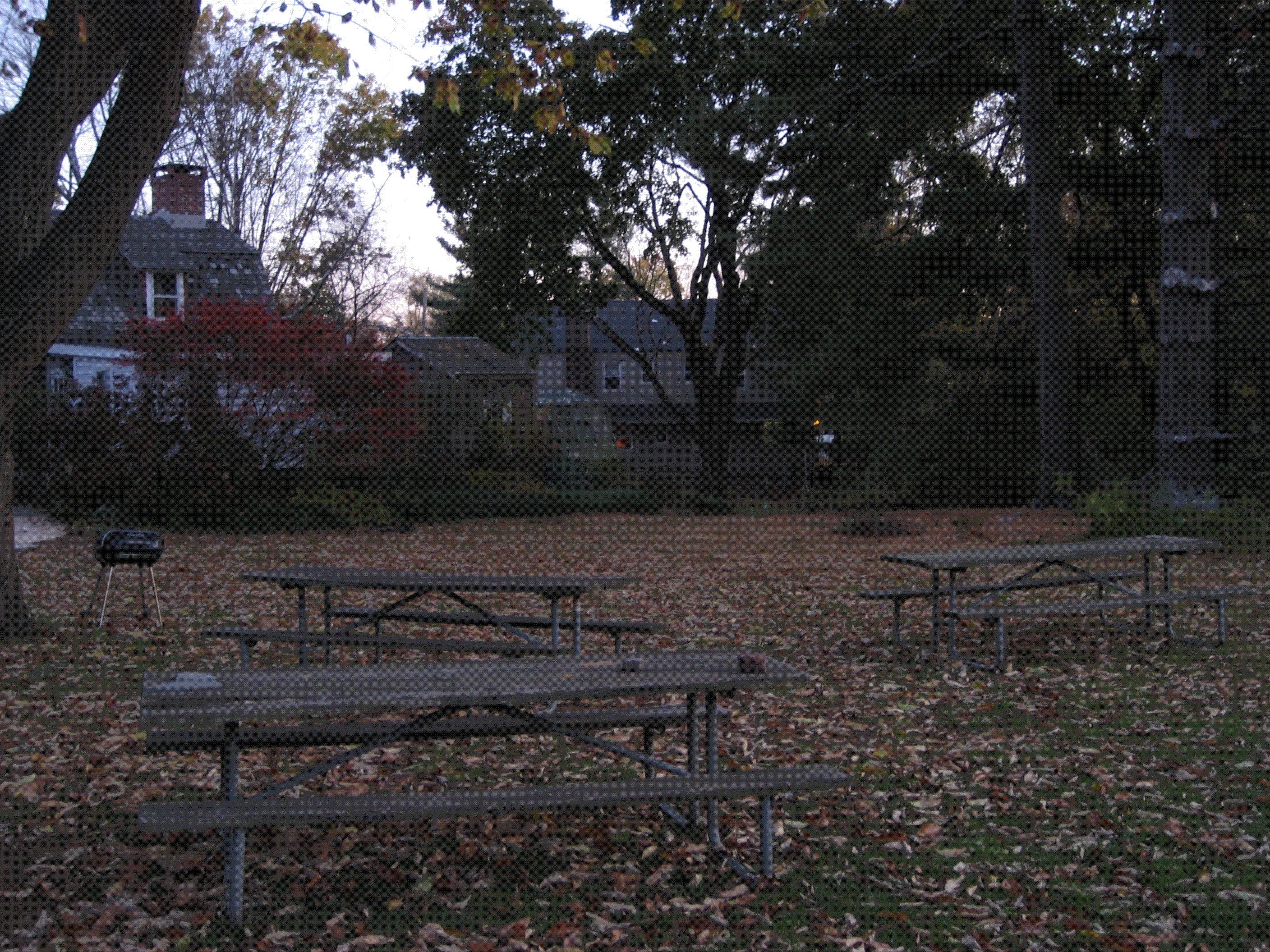
Garretson Picnic and Recreation Area

Garretson Forge and Farm provides a role in the local community as well as being a living museum and garden. The local community uses the outdoor picnic and recreation area to hold town meetings and to have guest speakers. There are also various activities that go on throughout the year, such as the Dutch Christmas celebration, that the community can participate in. Furthermore, Garretson Forge and Farm is run by the community who volunteers as tour guides, gardeners, and other useful jobs pertaining to the upkeep of the garden and living museum. There is a local elementary school in the area that hosts annual field trips to the Garretson Forge and Farm. Students from the school get a specialized tour of the grounds, and participate in various activities around the farm.

== See also ==
- National Register of Historic Places listings in Bergen County, New Jersey
