= Cadmus-Folly House =

Historic house in New Jersey, US

- U.S. National Register of Historic Places
- New Jersey Register of Historic Places
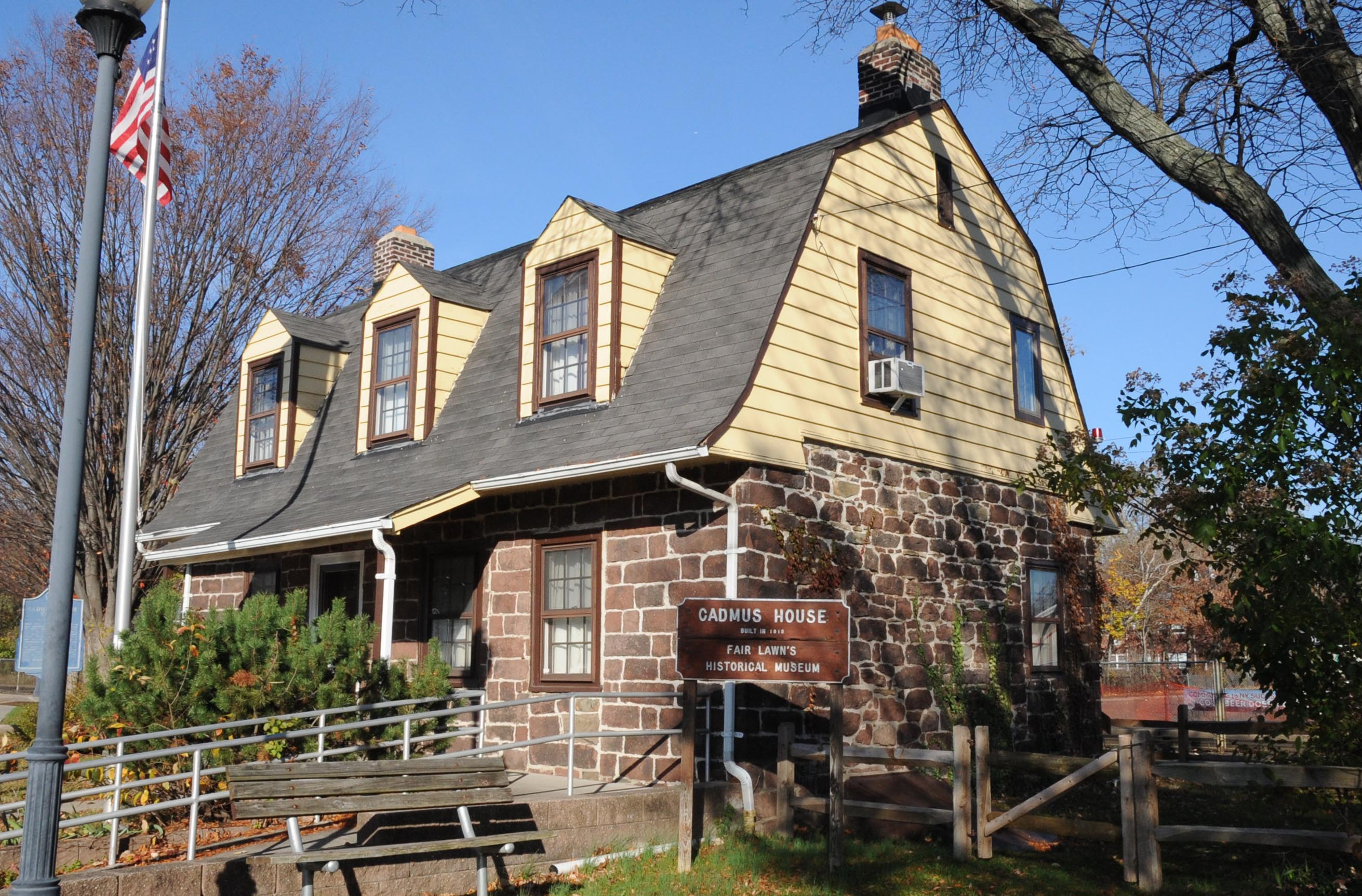

- Location within Bergen County, New Jersey Location within New Jersey Location within the United States
- Location: 19-21 Fair Lawn Avenue, Fair Lawn, New Jersey
- Coordinates: 40°56′19″N 74°7′24″W
- Area: less than one acre
- MPS: Stone Houses of Bergen County TR
- NRHP reference No.: 83001479
- NJRHP No.: 479

Significant dates
- Added to NRHP: January 10, 1983
- Designated NJRHP: October 3, 1980

Cadmus-Folly House is located in Fair Lawn, Bergen County, New Jersey, United States. The house was added to the National Register of Historic Places on January 10, 1983.

== See also ==
- National Register of Historic Places listings in Bergen County, New Jersey
