= Bruce Jankowski =

American football player (born 1949)

No. 41, 28
- Position: Wide receiver

Personal information
- Born: August 12, 1949 (age 77); Paterson, New Jersey, U.S.
- Listed height: 5 ft 11 in (1.80 m)
- Listed weight: 185 lb (84 kg)

Career information
- High school: Fair Lawn (Fair Lawn, New Jersey)
- College: Ohio State (1967–1970)
- NFL draft: 1971: 10th round, 250th overall pick

Career history
- Kansas City Chiefs (1971–1972); Chicago Fire (1974)*; Houston Texans/Shreveport Steamer (1974); Kansas City Chiefs (1975)*
- * Offseason or practice squad member only

Awards and highlights
- 2× National champion (1968, 1970); Second-team All-Big Ten (1968)
- Stats at Pro Football Reference

Bruce David Jankowski (born August 12, 1949) is an American former professional football wide receiver who played two seasons with the Kansas City Chiefs of the National Football League (NFL). He played college football at Ohio State University. He also played for the Houston Texans/Shreveport Steamer of the World Football League (WFL).

== Early life ==
Bruce David Jankowski was born on August 12, 1949, in Paterson, New Jersey. He attended Fair Lawn High School in Fair Lawn, New Jersey.

== College career ==
Jankowski was on the Ohio State Buckeyes freshman team in 1967 and a three-year letterman from 1968 to 1970. He caught 30 passes for 326 yards and three touchdowns in 1968, earning Associated Press second-team All-Big Ten honors. The 1968 Buckeyes went 10–0 that season and were named consensus national champions. Jankowski recorded 23 receptions for 404 yards and five touchdowns in 1969. In 1970, he caught 12 passes for 235 yards and one touchdown as the Buckeyes were named consensus national champions.

== Professional career ==
Jankowski was selected by the Kansas City Chiefs in the tenth round, with the 250th overall pick, of the 1971 NFL draft. He played in five games for the Chiefs in 1971 but did not record any statistics. He appeared in four games, starting two, during the 1971 season, totaling two receptions for 24 yards. He was released by the Chiefs in 1973.

Jankowski signed with the Chicago Fire of the World Football League (WFL) on February 20, 1974, but did not play in any games for them. He instead played for the Houston Texans/Shreveport Steamer during the 1974 WFL season, catching five passes for 152 yards, returning two punts for two yards, and rushing once for four yards. In May 1975, he was selected by the San Antonio Wings of the WFL in an expansion draft but never played for them.

Jankowski was re-signed by the Chiefs in 1975 but later released.
