= Silent News =

Canadian newspaper for the deaf

- Type: Daily newspaper (until 2003)
- Founder(s): Julius Wiggins
- Founded: 1969; 56 years ago
- Ceased publication: 2003
- Country: Canada
- OCLC number: 4979221
- Website: silentnews.ca

Silent News was the premier national newspaper for the deaf. Founded by Julius Wiggins (1928-2001), Silent News was published from January 1969 until 2003.

Wiggins and his family moved from Toronto, Ontario, Canada to a home in Fair Lawn, New Jersey, where they began development of a newspaper for the deaf that was launched in January 1969.

== See also ==
- The Silent Worker
