= Fair Lawn, New Jersey =

Borough in Bergen County, New Jersey, US

- Borough
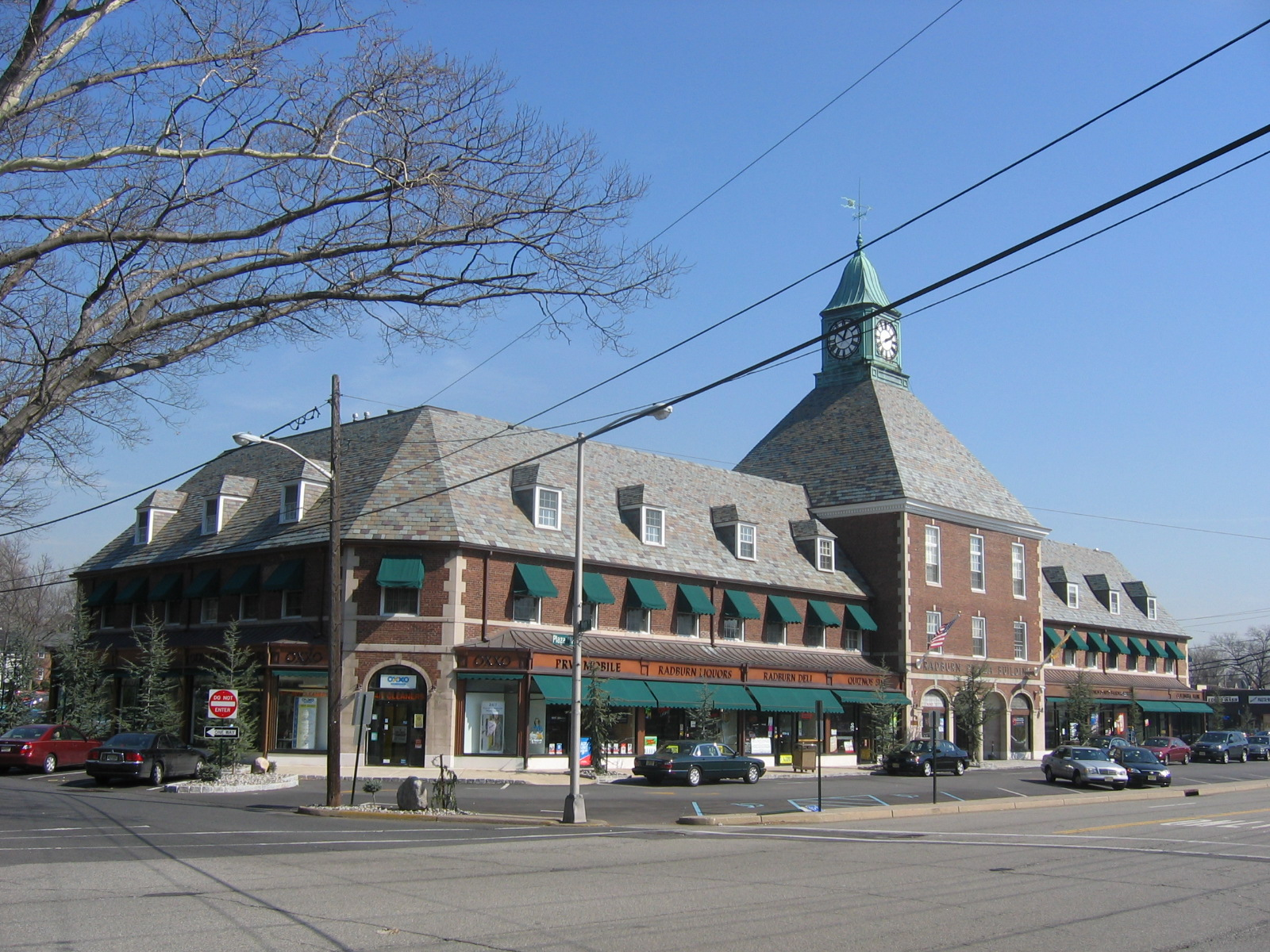
- Radburn Plaza

- Seal
- Motto(s): "A great place to visit and a better place to live."
- Location of Fair Lawn in Bergen County highlighted in red (left). Inset map: Location of Bergen County in New Jersey highlighted in orange (right).

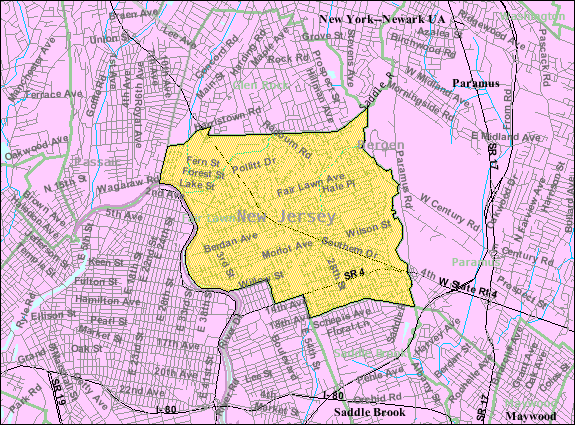
- Census Bureau map of Fair Lawn, New Jersey
- Interactive map of Fair Lawn, New Jersey
- Location in Bergen County Location in New Jersey Location in the United States
- Coordinates: 40.935833°N 74.117504°W
- Country: United States
- State: New Jersey
- County: Bergen
- Incorporated: March 6, 1924
- Named for: David Acker's estate, Fairlawn

Government
  - Type: Faulkner Act (council–manager)
  - Body: Borough Council
  - Mayor: Gail Friedberg Rottenstrich (D, acting mayor for term ending December 31, 2025)
  - Manager: Kurt Peluso
  - Municipal clerk: Nicholas Magarelli

Area
  - Total: 5.22 sq mi (13.53 km^{2})
  - Land: 5.14 sq mi (13.30 km^{2})
  - Water: 0.089 sq mi (0.23 km^{2}) 1.53%
  - Rank: 271st of 565 in state 11th of 70 in county
- Elevation: 69 ft (21 m)

Population (2020)
  - Total: 34,927
  - Estimate (2023): 35,564
  - Rank: 68th of 565 in state 4th of 70 in county
  - Density: 6,801.8/sq mi (2,626.2/km^{2})
  - Rank: 71st of 565 in state 21st of 70 in county
- Time zone: UTC−05:00 (Eastern (EST))
  - Summer (DST): UTC−04:00 (Eastern (EDT))
- ZIP Code: 07410
- Area code: 201 exchanges: 398, 475, 703, 791, 794, 796, 797
- FIPS code: 3400322470
- GNIS feature ID: 0885214
- Website: www.fairlawn.org

Fair Lawn is a borough in Bergen County, in the U.S. state of New Jersey, and a bedroom suburb located 12 miles (19 km) northwest of New York City. As of the 2020 United States census, the borough's population was 34,927, an increase of 2,470 (+7.6%) from the 2010 census count of 32,457, which in turn reflected an increase of 820 (+2.6%) from the 31,637 counted in the 2000 census.

Fair Lawn was incorporated as a borough by an act of the New Jersey Legislature on March 6, 1924, as "Fairlawn", from portions of Saddle River Township. The name was taken from Fairlawn, David Acker's estate home, that was built in 1865 and later became the Fair Lawn Municipal Building. In 1933, the official spelling of the borough's name was split into its present two-word form as "Fair Lawn" Borough.

Radburn, one of the first planned communities in the United States, is an unincorporated community located within Fair Lawn and was founded in 1929 as "a town for the motor age." Fair Lawn is home to a large number of commuters to New York City, to which it is connected by train from two railroad stations on NJ Transit's Bergen County Line, the Radburn and Broadway stations.

Fair Lawn's motto is "A great place to visit and a better place to live."

== History and historical significance ==
The first settlers of Fair Lawn were members of the Lenape tribe, of Native Americans, a group of hunter gatherers who eventually sold their land to incoming Dutch and Irish settlers and migrated to Pennsylvania. The new colonists turned the region, part of the New Barbadoes Township, into five large farm lots, conjoined by two main roads—Paramus and Saddle River—and named it "slooterdam" (after a V-shaped sluice-like fishing weir built in the Passaic River by the Lenni Lenape). The name stuck until 1791. In the 1800s, these five lots became nine smaller lots, and three new roads—Fair Lawn Avenue, Lincoln Avenue, and Prospect Street—were constructed to encourage mobility between them. Eighty houses were built by 1861, and the renamed Small Lots, now a part of the Saddle River Township and home to multiple vegetable and fruit farms and dairies, became an agricultural community. Berdan Avenue, a new road located near five Berdan family farms, was soon added and Victorian homes were built alongside it and in nearby areas. The grandest of the estates, perched atop a hill by Small Lots Road was David Acker's estate "Fairlawn", from which the township gets its name (Images of America, Page 7) and is now the site of the borough's library.

Rapid suburban development of the town occurred in three sections: the River Road–Fair Lawn Avenue area known as "Memorial Park", the area at Lincoln Avenue and Wagaraw Road known as "Columbus Heights", and the area east of the railroad and south of Broadway, known as Warren Point. The development of this section was catalyzed by the "establishment of a post office, a railroad station, and a trolley to the Hudson River" (Images of America, Page 8).

In the 1900s, Fair Lawn residents were displeased about the schooling situation as part of Saddle River Township; the schools were either dilapidated or too far away for Fair Lawn residents, and citizens felt that they were not getting schools comparable to the tax money they were paying. As such, a movement to separate from Saddle River Township was born. Fair Lawn residents petitioned to the state, asking to incorporate as an independent borough, and in April 1924, the borough of Fair Lawn was voted into existence.

Fair Lawn is home to the following eight sites listed on the National Register of Historic Places:

- Peter Garretson House, 4-02 River Road (1974)
- Irregular pattern between Radburn Road and the Erie Rail Road tracks in Radburn (1975)
- G.V.H. Berdan House, 1219 River Road (1983)
- Richard J. Berdan House, 2407 Fair Lawn Avenue
- Cadmus-Folly House, 19-21 Fair Lawn Avenue
- Naugle House, 42-49 Dunkerhook Road – Built in the 1750s, the house was acquired by the borough.
- Jacob Vanderbeck Jr. House, 41-25 Dunkerhook Road – Constructed in 1754, the house was named by Preservation New Jersey as one of New Jersey's 10 most endangered historic places
- Radburn station, Pollitt Drive (1984)

Other sites, in addition to those listed above, are also considered historic by the Historic Sites Survey Committee of the Bergen County Historic Sites Advisory Board, including:

- Henry A. Hopper House
- George Washington School (Recommended as a National Register possibility, but needs further documentation)
- Fair Lawn, Berdan, and Prospect Avenues, Plaza and Radburn Roads
- Peter Demarest House on Fair Lawn Avenue
- Warren Bronze and Aluminum Factory on Second Street

In July 1982, an NJ Transit train derailed and crashed into a pasta factory, killing the train's engineer. The derailment resulted from a group of teens who had tampered with the tracks. Two of the five youths charged with the crime were convicted of manslaughter for their roles in the incident and were given five-year sentences in a state correctional facility.

== Geography ==
According to the United States Census Bureau, the borough had a total area of 5.22 square miles (13.53 km^{2}), including 5.14 square miles (13.30 km^{2}) of land and 0.09 square miles (0.23 km^{2}) of water (1.70%).

The borough borders Paterson (in Passaic County, across the Passaic River) to the west; Hawthorne across Lincoln Avenue to the West; Glen Rock across Harristown Road, Maple Avenue, the northern border of the former Nabisco plant and its extension north of Garwood Road and Naugle Drive to the north; Ridgewood across the Saddle River to the northeast; Paramus across the Saddle River to the east; Rochelle Park across another point in the Saddle River to the southeast; with Saddle Brook across the two longer portions of South Broadway and their extensions through Rosario Court to the south; and Elmwood Park across the Bergen County Line, New Jersey Route 4 (Broadway), Cyril Avenue and Willow Street to the south. The hills of Wyckoff are visible from the northern neighborhoods of Fair Lawn.

=== Neighborhoods ===
Fair Lawn is an incorporated collection of diverse neighborhoods, each with its own distinct character and vibe. Unincorporated communities, localities and place names located partially or completely within the borough include:

- Berdan Grove, a residential neighborhood of single-family homes behind Thomas Jefferson Middle School, surrounding Berdan Grove Park on Berdan Avenue. This neighborhood is home to the borough's highest concentration of Asian Americans and includes Milnes Elementary School.
- Broadway District contains the major commercial thoroughfare of Broadway and houses the Broadway District commuter stop for NJ Transit's Bergen County Line train. Roughly located around the Warren Point and Lyncrest areas, the district also extends as far as Morlot Avenue along the tracks, roughly around or a little after Glen Rock Lumber, housing many industries on Banta Place. The Broadway District is mainly a shopping district as it contains many stores, eateries, hobby centers, salons, and other businesses. Not only is it the largest stretch of stores within Fair Lawn, it also houses one of the highest densities of nail and beauty salons in the United States. The Broadway District stretches from the Route 4 split with Route 208 and continues all through Fair Lawn and includes a few blocks of Elmwood Park. Broadway also hosts the route of local Paterson-New York Spanish Transportation minibuses, known locally as guaguas, as a cheaper alternative for commuters to and from New York. It is one of only a handful of Bergen-Passaic-Hudson districts that even offers this service.
- Central Fair Lawn is bounded by Morlot and Fair Lawn Avenues on the south and north, respectively, by River Road on the west, and Route 208 on the east and northeast. The borough's Municipal Complex, which houses its administrative, legal, financial, and police divisions, is located in this neighborhood, as are the Fair Lawn Public Library, Fair Lawn High School, and John A. Forrest Elementary School.
- Dunkerhook, the Dark Corner (Donckerhoek in old Dutch), is on both sides of a former bridge over the Saddle River, in Fair Lawn and Paramus, near Fair Lawn Avenue. The Vanderbeck and Naugle houses there are both from the 18th century.
- The Heights, more precisely known as "Columbia Heights", is located near Hawthorne's industrial section along the Passaic River on Wagaraw Road and Hawthorne's residential area at Lincoln Avenue as well as bordering Bunker Hill in Paterson. This well-maintained neighborhood houses some local industry outside of the McBride Industrial District that borders Glen Rock and is known by some of its residents as the "Bunker Hill Extension" or the "Walsh Area".
- Hendersonville, also referred to as "Riverside East". This diverse neighborhood, located between Columbia Heights and the Municipal Complex within the "Westmoreland District", as well as sharing Route 208 with the neighboring borough of Glen Rock, is a mostly residential community of two-family Cape Cod-style houses located down the stretch of Henderson Boulevard curving around to 11th Street. Distinct to this neighborhood in comparison with other two-family districts and sections is that each Cape Cod has two doors in the front so each residing family has its own entrance into its respective quarters, a blueprint that was abandoned shortly after being built in favor of a "one door, two entrances" model. Westmoreland Elementary School is located in this neighborhood.
- Lyncrest neighborhood, located south of Morlot Avenue, in alignment with Paterson's 33rd Street split into that city's Upper Eastside and Eastside neighborhoods, is an extension of the Eastside and notable for its older, stone houses in the footsteps of homes once owned by Paterson's former silk barons. This community is also diverse, with immigrants from Europe, Asia, the Middle East, as well as various parts of the Americas. It is home to many Orthodox Jewish, Indian American, and Russian American families, among other ethnic and religious groups. Lyncrest streets "1st-6th" are also known by the name of "Rivercrest" by locals, due to the split level and Cape Cod-style architecture of housing located in the "River Dip" adjacent to Memorial Park. Lyncrest Elementary School is located in this neighborhood.
- McBride Industrial District is the area incorporating the McBride Industrial Park located between Fair Lawn Borough's border with Glen Rock and the Chandler Houses and Fair Lawn Commons communities. It currently houses the former Nabisco cookie factory, which has played a major role in not only Fair Lawn's identity itself, but also Glen Rock, Ridgewood, Paterson, Prospect Park, Haledon, Hawthorne, and Western Paramus near the Dunkerhook and Saddle River Areas, causing those venturing throughout these areas to coin the nickname "Cookie-City" as a general area term, describing the fragrance of freshly baked cookies that filled these areas on baking days. In the past, the McBride Industrial District took up both sides of Route 208, stretching from Fair Lawn Avenue to the intersection at Maple Avenue and Harristown Road, running up to the Bergen County Line train tracks via the Radburn District, and housing companies such as Nabisco, Kodak, Maxell, and others. More recently the district has been in the process of deindustrialization and corporate gentrification, as older companies fold or move out, replacing industrial properties with residential-commercial "mini-cities", as well as the headquarters of New Jersey's Columbia Savings Bank.
- Memorial Park, a working-class neighborhood (sometimes called the "River Dip", "East River Area","Eastside Dip", "Riverside", or the more modern "Yang"; the aerial view of the neighborhood makes a "Ying Yang" symbol with neighboring East Side Park) within and around the River Road Improvement District with street addresses aligned with the corner of 33rd Street and Martin Luther King Way (Broadway) in neighboring Paterson. The Memorial Park neighborhood borders the Passaic River and contains the park next to Memorial Middle School named Memorial Park which houses a World War II Memorial commemorating those who fought in the war. The park is the terminus of the annual Memorial Day parade and the site of the Memorial pool and beach as well as the Independence Day fireworks show. Residential gentrification is occurring with the leveling of two-family rental housing for more modern single-family housing in this area.
- Radburn is a planned community also housing the landmark Radburn Plaza building, which was destroyed in a fire in 2002 and subsequently rebuilt. With its safe and easy access to local businesses and schools, and Fair Lawn's largest U.S. Postal Service branch, this neighborhood also offers commuter trains from Radburn station to the Secaucus Junction rail transfer station as well as to the PATH train in Hoboken, both of which provide rail connections to New York City. This neighborhood includes Radburn Elementary School and Daly Field. An annual street fair is held here in June.
- Radrock Estates is a small neighborhood around two streets, Well Drive and Split Rock Road, with a private park within the block they enclose, reminiscent of nearby Radburn but a separate development built about 1940. The entrance street from Fair Lawn Avenue has an entrance pillar on each side displaying the name. The surrounding area to the north and east, while built after World War II, is considered to be an extended part of Radrock Estates. Although it is a very diverse residential section, this neighborhood shares the conveniences of living in Radburn including dining, retail access, as well as rail access from Radburn Station.
- The River Road District, with an annual street fair in autumn, houses many functional businesses, including numerous banks, ethnic restaurants and supermarkets, small offices, retail telecommunications outlets, both a United Parcel Service store and a U.S. Post Office branch, and the landmark Joker's Child comic book store. River Road in this district is also zoned for apartments located above businesses.
- Warren Point, a residential area located near the Broadway District. Bordering Saddle Brook and Elmwood Park, it has many stores, big and small, and many eateries. The neighborhood also offers commuter trains from Broadway station to Hoboken's PATH and to Secaucus Junction via the Bergen County Line, as well as to the George Washington Bridge Bus Station in Washington Heights, Manhattan, via jitney buses. Warren Point Elementary School and the private St. Anne School are located in this neighborhood. Warren Point also is home to a small World War I monument honoring men from the neighborhood who fought in and died during the war.

Other neighborhoods in the borough include "Fair Lawn Commons" (The Commons) off Route 208, located within the Radburn Historical District; Radburn's El Dorado Village, which is known for its Eastern European immigrant residents; and just to its west, the "Chandler Houses". Fair Lawn's newest neighborhood is Fair Lawn Promenade (The Promenade), a mixed-use development extending northward from The Commons along Route 208 North, consisting of apartments, shops, offices and restaurants.

== Ethnic diversity ==
Fair Lawn has a longstanding tradition of ethnic diversity and a tolerance for people of different ethnicities and religious faiths. Continuing steady immigration from Eurasia, Asia, Europe, and Latin America has transformed Fair Lawn into an international melting pot, and over 50 languages and dialects are spoken in the borough.

=== History of ethnic diversity ===
Fair Lawn has been a center for Jewish culture over a period spanning several decades. Since the early 2000s, the Orthodox Jewish population has been increasing significantly and has replaced the earlier decreases in members of the non-Orthodox Jewish sects. After the collapse of the Soviet Union in 1991, Russian Jews began to migrate to Fair Lawn. Fair Lawn's Jewish American population has therefore maintained an at least one-third presence overall for several decades. Russian Jews were then followed by Russian Orthodox Christians.

Over 10% of the borough's population is of Russian descent, the highest of any community in New Jersey, and increasing with continued migration of Russian Americans from Brooklyn. The size of Fair Lawn's Russian American presence prompted a 2014 April Fool's satire titled, "Putin Moves Against Fair Lawn", which erroneously claimed the Russian country was sending its troops directly to Fair Lawn. Fair Lawn also has the largest Israeli American community in Bergen County. On November 22, 2015, the Jewish Historical Society of North Jersey celebrated the grand opening of a permanent home at 17-10 River Road in Fair Lawn, after being housed at various locations, mostly in neighboring Paterson, for decades.

Fair Lawn has historically had a large Italian American population, 19.7% in 2000, but this number is decreasing as the descendants of the original Italian immigrants are being displaced by immigrants from around the globe.

Fair Lawn's reputable school district, safe and well-policed neighborhoods, and the borough's convenient access to commercial centers and hospitals, a complex network of highways, transit lines, New York City, and Newark Liberty International Airport, have all made Fair Lawn a magnet for new immigrants from several regions around the world. The 2012 American Community Survey conducted by the Census Bureau showed a significant increase in the Asian American population, including the Asian Indian, Filipino American, Chinese American, Korean American, and Vietnamese American populations, and the Polish American population is also growing. The public library in Fair Lawn holds storytelling programs in Hindi and Hebrew languages, while Mandarin Chinese has been taught in the school district since the 2007–2008 school year. Fair Lawn's first annual Hindu Holi festival was held in 2022.

A number of places for congregation cater to different nationalities in Fair Lawn, including three Korean churches, one Taiwanese church, Young Israel of Fair Lawn, Saint Leon Armenian Church, and the (Italian American) Cosmos Club of Fair Lawn. Several Filipino organizations are based in Fair Lawn. Between the 2010 Census and the 2013–2017 American Community Survey, Fair Lawn's Filipino population was estimated to have increased by more than 50% (from 626 in 2010 to 952 in 2013–2017).

==== Immigrants from former Soviet Union ====
Given the established presence of Russian Americans in the borough, immigrant nationalities native to other republics of the Former Soviet Union, including Ukrainian Americans, Georgian Americans, Armenian Americans, and Uzbek Americans have also established an increasing presence in Fair Lawn.

As a suburb of New York City, Fair Lawn has a diverse population. The town has a high Jewish immigration population, as well as Muslim immigrants, including Albanian Americans and Macedonian Americans, as well as Latino Americans, including Peruvian Americans and Stateside Puerto Ricans, have settled in Fair Lawn's western flank, in the Memorial Park neighborhood between the River Road Improvement District and the Passaic River, where there is also a small but stable African American population.

== Demographics ==
Historical population
Census	Pop.	Note	%±
1900	756		—
1910	1,178		55.8%
1920	2,026		72.0%
1930	5,990		195.7%
1940	9,107		52.0%
1950	23,885		162.3%
1960	36,421		52.5%
1970	37,975		4.3%
1980	32,229		−15.1%
1990	30,548		−5.2%
2000	31,637		3.6%
2010	32,457		2.6%
2020	34,927		7.6%
2023 (est.)	35,564	▲	1.8%
Population sources: 1930 1900–2020; 2000 2010 2020

=== Racial and ethnic composition ===
Fair Lawn borough, Bergen County, New Jersey – Racial and ethnic composition Note: the US Census treats Hispanic/Latino as an ethnic category. This table excludes Latinos from the racial categories and assigns them to a separate category. Hispanics/Latinos may be of any race.
Race / Ethnicity (NH = Non-Hispanic)	Pop 2000	Pop 2010	Pop 2020	% 2000	% 2010	% 2020
White alone (NH)	27,737	25,151	23,305	87.67%	77.49%	66.72%
Black or African American alone (NH)	208	464	784	0.66%	1.43%	2.24%
Native American or Alaska Native alone (NH)	10	14	24	0.03%	0.04%	0.07%
Asian alone (NH)	1,549	3,130	4,468	4.90%	9.64%	12.79%
Native Hawaiian or Pacific Islander alone (NH)	1	1	10	0.00%	0.00%	0.03%
Other race alone (NH)	39	60	190	0.12%	0.18%	0.54%
Mixed race or Multiracial (NH)	349	341	777	1.10%	1.05%	2.22%
Hispanic or Latino (any race)	1,744	3,296	5,369	5.51%	10.15%	15.37%
Total	31,637	32,457	34,927	100.00%	100.00%	100.00%

=== 2020 census ===
As of the 2020 census, Fair Lawn had a population of 34,927. The median age was 42.1 years. 22.7% of residents were under the age of 18 and 18.4% of residents were 65 years of age or older. For every 100 females there were 94.4 males, and for every 100 females age 18 and over there were 91.1 males age 18 and over.

100.0% of residents lived in urban areas, while 0.0% lived in rural areas.

There were 12,243 households in Fair Lawn, of which 36.3% had children under the age of 18 living in them. Of all households, 62.9% were married-couple households, 11.8% were households with a male householder and no spouse or partner present, and 21.5% were households with a female householder and no spouse or partner present. About 19.6% of all households were made up of individuals and 10.7% had someone living alone who was 65 years of age or older.

There were 12,649 housing units, of which 3.2% were vacant. The homeowner vacancy rate was 1.0% and the rental vacancy rate was 4.0%.

=== 2010 census ===
The 2010 United States census counted 32,457 people, 11,930 households, and 8,971 families in the borough. The population density was 6,315.4 per square mile (2,438.4/km^{2}). There were 12,266 housing units at an average density of 2,386.7 per square mile (921.5/km^{2}). The racial makeup was 84.36% (27,380) White, 1.75% (567) Black or African American, 0.06% (20) Native American, 9.72% (3,154) Asian, 0.00% (1) Pacific Islander, 2.35% (762) from other races, and 1.77% (573) from two or more races. Hispanic or Latino of any race were 10.15% (3,296) of the population.

Of the 11,930 households, 33.3% had children under the age of 18; 62.7% were married couples living together; 9.1% had a female householder with no husband present and 24.8% were non-families. Of all households, 21.3% were made up of individuals and 10.7% had someone living alone who was 65 years of age or older. The average household size was 2.70 and the average family size was 3.17.

22.0% of the population were under the age of 18, 6.8% from 18 to 24, 24.0% from 25 to 44, 30.8% from 45 to 64, and 16.3% who were 65 years of age or older. The median age was 43.1 years. For every 100 females, the population had 92.2 males. For every 100 females ages 18 and older there were 88.9 males.

The Census Bureau's 2006–2010 American Community Survey showed that (in 2010 inflation-adjusted dollars) median household income was $92,727 (with a margin of error of +/− $4,701) and the median family income was $112,650 (+/− $5,760). Males had a median income of $70,990 (+/− $3,246) versus $54,358 (+/− $2,815) for females. The per capita income for the borough was $40,146 (+/− $1,700). About 2.1% of families and 3.4% of the population were below the poverty line, including 4.3% of those under age 18 and 6.3% of those age 65 or over.

Same-sex couples headed 64 households in 2010, an increase from the 49 counted in 2000.

=== 2000 census ===
As of the 2000 United States census there were 31,637 people, 11,806 households, and 8,901 families residing in the borough. The population density was 6,121.0 inhabitants per square mile (2,363.3/km^{2}). There were 12,006 housing units at an average density of 2,322.9 per square mile (896.9/km^{2}). The racial makeup of the borough was 91.54% Caucasian, 4.92% Asian, 0.74% Black or African American, 0.04% Native American, 1.37% from other races, and 1.38% reporting two or more races. Hispanics or Latinos of any race were 5.51% of the population.

There were 11,806 households, out of which 33.4% had children under the age of 18 living with them, 63.5% were married couples living together, 9.0% had a female householder with no husband present, and 24.6% were non-families. 21.3% of all households were made up of individuals, and 12.3% had someone living alone who was 65 years of age or older. The average household size was 2.67 and the average family size was 3.12.

In the borough the population was spread out, with 22.8% under the age of 18, 6.0% from 18 to 24, 26.9% from 25 to 44, 25.6% from 45 to 64, and 18.7% who were 65 years of age or older. The median age was 42 years. For every 100 females, there were 90.6 males. For every 100 females age 18 and over, there were 87.7 males.

The median income for a household in the borough was $72,127, and the median income for a family was $81,220. Males had a median income of $56,798 versus $41,300 for females. The per capita income for the borough was $32,273. About 2.6% of families and 3.7% of the population were below the poverty line, including 2.7% of those under age 18 and 6.9% of those age 65 or over.

== Economy ==
Businesses headquartered or located in Fair Lawn include:

A major cookie/bakery/office operation of Nabisco/Mondelēz International, located along Route 208 North, had been the borough's largest employer and taxpayer for more than 60 years, until its shutdown was announced in 2021 when the company sent termination notices to employees. Demolition of the plant, which had opened in 1958 and produced as many as 175 million pounds (79 million kilograms) of cookies annually, began in January 2023.

U.S. Technologies, a high-precision electronics corporation, is headquartered in Fair Lawn.

Columbia Bank (New Jersey), the fourth largest mutual financial institution in the United States, and the largest mutual bank domiciled within the State of New Jersey, is also headquartered in Fair Lawn.

Thermal energy storage company CALMAC of Fair Lawn had performed about 4,000 commercial air-cooling installations in 37 countries by 2014.

Danbee Investigations, a global detective agency, is based in Fair Lawn.

A. Zerega's Sons Inc., founded in 1848 in Brooklyn and currently based in Fair Lawn, describes itself as the fifth-largest pasta maker in the United States, producing 100 million pounds of pasta annually.

The Filipino American Festival, a non-profit corporation describing its mission to include educating Filipino Americans to engage in community partnership, is headquartered in Fair Lawn. The company presents the annual Filipino-American Festival in Bergenfield in eastern Bergen County.

Kuiken Brothers, a major supplier of residential and commercial building materials in the New York City metropolitan area, is headquartered in Fair Lawn.

Fair Lawn Promenade is a mixed-use retail / residential / business complex that opened on April 1, 2014. It has shops, restaurants, condominium rooms, and offices. Businesses there include the first East Coast location of The Habit Burger Grill.

== Sports ==
Fair Lawn has one of the original organized street hockey/DekHockey programs in the state. The Fair Lawn Flyers competed in the first national street hockey championships in 1976 in Leominster, Massachusetts.

Fair Lawn Lanes includes 32 bowling lanes, an arcade, and a lounge.

== Parks and recreation ==
Parks in Fair Lawn include:

- Memorial Park – located on 1st Street, which has an inline skating rink, playing fields, basketball courts, and a beach park.
- Berdan Grove Park – located on Berdan Avenue, home of the John Alaimo Field for baseball, basketball courts, walking paths, and a playground.
- Gregory Park – located on 28th Street, which has a basketball court, playground, baseball field, and a walking path.
- Cresthill Park – located on Godwin Avenue, which has a playground, and a basketball court.

Dietch's Kiddie Zoo was a children's zoo that opened in 1951. It also included kiddie rides and a train ride. The zoo closed in 1967.

== Government ==
=== Local government ===
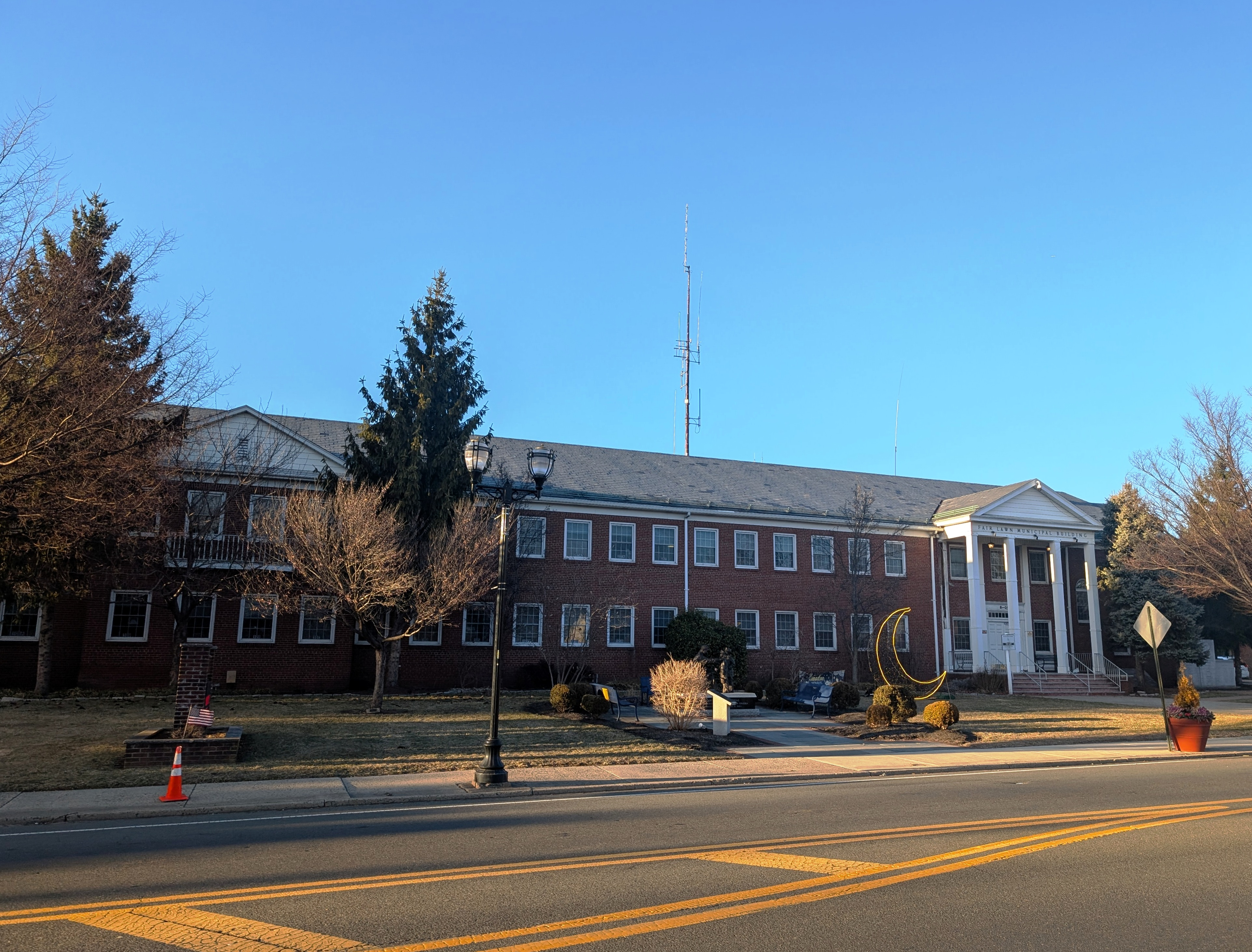
Fair Lawn Municipal Building

Fair Lawn operates within the Faulkner Act (formally known as the Optional Municipal Charter Law) under the Council-Manager plan E form of New Jersey municipal government, as implemented as of January 1, 1986, based on direct petition. The borough is one of 42 municipalities (of the 564) statewide that use this form of government. The governing body is comprised of a five-member borough council. Members of the Borough Council serve four-year terms in office and are elected at-large in partisan elections in odd-numbered years on a staggered basis, with either two or three seats coming up for election every other year as part of the November general election. All policy making power is concentrated in the council. At an annual reorganization meeting held after each election, the council selects a mayor, a deputy mayor, and a deputy mayor for community affairs from among its members. The mayor presides over its meetings with no separate policy-making power. A borough manager is appointed by the council to serve as the municipal chief executive and administrative official.

As of 2024, the members of the Borough Council are acting Mayor Gail Friedberg Rottenstrich (D, term as mayor and on committee ends December 31, 2025), Deputy Mayor Cristina Cutrone (D, term on council ends 2027; term as deputy mayor ends 2025), Deputy Mayor of Community Affairs Joshua Reinitz (D, term on council and as deputy mayor ends 2025), Kris Krause (D, 2027) and Nathalie Salinas (D, 2027; appointed to serve an unexpired term).

Kurt Peluso stepped down from office in February 2024 to take office as borough manager at a salary of $175,000; in his place, Deputy Mayor Cristina Cutrone took over as acting mayor. Gail Friedberg Rottenstrich was appointed as mayor in March 2024 and will serve the balance of the term of office as a mayor while Nathalie Salinas was appointed to fill the seat expiring in December 2027 that had been held by Peluso until his resignation; Peluso will serve on an interim basis until the November 2024 general election when voters will choose a candidate to serve the remainder of the term of office.

In May 2018, the borough council appointed Cristina Cutrone to fill the seat expiring in December 2019 that was vacated by Mayor Lisa Swain when she took office in the General Assembly; Kurt Peluso replaced Swain as mayor and in turn Gail Rottenstrich replaced him as deputy mayor. Cutrone served on the council on an interim basis until the November 2018 general election, when she was elected to serve the balance of the term of office. Regular Borough Council meetings are televised on local cable TV when held in the council chambers in the Fair Lawn Municipal Building. Work sessions, where laws are discussed and prepared for adoption, are not usually televised.

==== Boards and commissions ====
Fair Lawn's government extends beyond the council and departments in the form of the following boards and commissions, which are generally staffed by volunteers appointed by the mayor and council:

- Alliance for Substance Abuse Prevention
- American with Disabilities Advisory Committee
- Arts Council
- Broadway Special Improvement District
- Cadmus House Museum
- Environmental Commission
- Garden Committee
- Green Team Advisory Committee
- Historic Preservation Commission
- Open Space Committee
- Planning Board
- Property Maintenance
- Rent Leveling Board
- River Road Improvement Corporation
- Shade Tree Advisory Committee
- Zoning Board

=== Federal, state and county representation ===
Fair Lawn is located in New Jersey's 5th Congressional District and is part of New Jersey's 38th state legislative district.

For the 119th United States Congress, New Jersey's 5th congressional district is represented by Josh Gottheimer (D, Wyckoff). New Jersey is represented in the United States Senate by Democrats Cory Booker (Newark, term ends 2027) and Andy Kim (Moorestown, term ends 2031).

For the 2026–2027 session, the 38th legislative district of the New Jersey Legislature is represented in the State Senate by Joseph Lagana (D, Paramus) and in the General Assembly by Lisa Swain (D, Fair Lawn) and Chris Tully (D, Bergenfield).

Bergen County is governed by a directly elected County Executive, with legislative functions performed by a Board of County Commissioners comprised of seven members who are elected at-large to three-year terms in partisan elections on a staggered basis, with either two or three seats coming up for election each November; a Chairman and Vice Chairman are selected from among its seven members at a reorganization meeting held every January. As of 2025, the county executive is James J. Tedesco III (D, Paramus), whose four-year term of office ends December 31, 2026.

Bergen County's Commissioners are Chair Mary J. Amoroso (D, Mahwah, 2025), Vice Chair Steven A. Tanelli (D, North Arlington, 2027), Chair Pro Tem Joan Voss (D, Fort Lee, 2026), Rafael Marte (D, Bergenfield, 2026), Germaine M. Ortiz (D, Emerson, 2025), Thomas J. Sullivan Jr. (D, Montvale, 2025) and Tracy Silna Zur (D, Franklin Lakes, 2027).

Bergen County's elected constitutional officials are Clerk John S. Hogan (D, Northvale, 2026), Sheriff Anthony Cureton (D, Englewood, 2027) and Surrogate Michael R. Dressler (D, Cresskill, 2026).

=== Politics ===
As of March 2011, there were a total of 20,302 registered voters in Fair Lawn, of which 7,150 (35.2% vs. 31.7% countywide) were registered as Democrats, 3,613 (17.8% vs. 21.1%) were registered as Republicans and 9,528 (46.9% vs. 47.1%) were registered as Unaffiliated. There were 11 voters registered as Libertarians or Greens. Among the borough's 2010 Census population, 62.6% (vs. 57.1% in Bergen County) were registered to vote, including 80.2% of those ages 18 and over (vs. 73.7% countywide).

Gubernatorial election results for Fair Lawn
Year	Republican		Democratic		Third party(ies)	
Year	No.	%	No.	%	No.	%
2025	6,328	45.08%	7,636	54.40%	73	0.52%
2021	5,269	46.19%	6,079	53.29%	60	0.53%
2017	3,630	40.53%	5,153	57.53%	174	1.94%
2013	5,377	57.15%	3,932	41.79%	100	1.06%
2009	4,590	42.96%	5,503	51.50%	592	5.54%
2005	4,029	37.98%	6,330	59.67%	249	2.35%

In the 2016 presidential election, Democrat Hillary Clinton received 8,993 votes (53.6% vs. 54.2% countywide), ahead of Republican Donald Trump with 7,062 votes (42.1% vs. 41.1%) and other candidates with 709 votes (4.2% vs. 4.6%), among the 16,875 ballots cast by the borough's 22,745 registered voters, for a turnout of 74.2% (vs. 72.5% in Bergen County). In the 2012 presidential election, Democrat Barack Obama received 8,374 votes (54.1% vs. 54.8% countywide), ahead of Republican Mitt Romney with 6,815 votes (44.0% vs. 43.5%) and other candidates with 188 votes (1.2% vs. 0.9%), among the 15,473 ballots cast by the borough's 21,563 registered voters, for a turnout of 71.8% (vs. 70.4% in Bergen County). In the 2008 presidential election, Democrat Barack Obama received 8,834 votes (53.2% vs. 53.9% countywide), ahead of Republican John McCain with 7,464 votes (45.0% vs. 44.5%) and other candidates with 147 votes (0.9% vs. 0.8%), among the 16,595 ballots cast by the borough's 21,378 registered voters, for a turnout of 77.6% (vs. 76.8% in Bergen County). In the 2004 presidential election, Democrat John Kerry received 8,745 votes (54.3% vs. 51.7% countywide), ahead of Republican George W. Bush with 7,177 votes (44.6% vs. 47.2%) and other candidates with 118 votes (0.7% vs. 0.7%), among the 16,102 ballots cast by the borough's 20,372 registered voters, for a turnout of 79.0% (vs. 76.9% in the whole county).

Presidential elections results
Year	Republican	Democratic
2024	48.0% 8,699	48.7% 8,826
2020	42.6% 8,342	55.7% 10,912
2016	42.1% 7,062	53.6% 8,993
2012	44.0% 6,815	54.1 8,374
2008	45.0% 7,464	53.2% 8,834
2004	44.6% 7,117	54.3% 8,745

In the 2013 gubernatorial election, Republican Chris Christie received 57.1% of the vote (5,377 cast), ahead of Democrat Barbara Buono with 41.8% (3,932 votes), and other candidates with 1.1% (100 votes), among the 9,642 ballots cast by the borough's 20,718 registered voters (233 ballots were spoiled), for a turnout of 46.5%. In the 2009 gubernatorial election, Democrat Jon Corzine received 5,503 ballots cast (51.1% vs. 48.0% countywide), ahead of Republican Chris Christie with 4,590 votes (42.6% vs. 45.8%), Independent Chris Daggett with 521 votes (4.8% vs. 4.7%) and other candidates with 71 votes (0.7% vs. 0.5%), among the 10,763 ballots cast by the borough's 20,714 registered voters, yielding a 52.0% turnout (vs. 50.0% in the county).

United States Senate election results for Fair Lawn1
Year	Republican		Democratic		Third party(ies)	
Year	No.	%	No.	%	No.	%
2024	7,871	46.34%	8,613	50.71%	500	2.94%
2018	5,173	42.22%	6,707	54.74%	372	3.04%
2012	5,684	40.37%	8,142	57.82%	255	1.81%
2006	4,084	40.42%	5,873	58.13%	146	1.45%

United States Senate election results for Fair Lawn2
Year	Republican		Democratic		Third party(ies)	
Year	No.	%	No.	%	No.	%
2020	7,959	41.73%	10,721	56.21%	393	2.06%
2014	3,435	40.06%	5,028	58.64%	111	1.29%
2013	2,412	39.64%	3,616	59.42%	57	0.94%
2008	5,851	39.08%	8,916	59.56%	203	1.36%

== Education ==
The Fair Lawn Public Schools serves students in pre-kindergarten through twelfth grade. As of the 2022–23 school year, the district, comprised of nine schools, had an enrollment of 5,529 students and 458.4 classroom teachers (on an FTE basis), for a student–teacher ratio of 12.1:1. Schools in the district (with 2022–23 enrollment data from the National Center for Education Statistics.) are Thomas Edison School for preschool, John A. Forrest Elementary School with 269 students in grades K-4, Lyncrest Elementary School with 207 students in grades K-4, Henry B. Milnes Elementary School with 428 students in grades K-4, Radburn Elementary School with 393 students in grades K-4, Warren Point Elementary School with 392 students in grades K-4, Westmoreland Elementary School with 393 students in grades PreK-4, Memorial Middle School with 626 students in grades 5-8, Thomas Jefferson Middle School with 1,134 students in grades 5-8 and Fair Lawn High School with 1,624 students in grades 9-12. The National Blue Ribbon Schools Program has recognized Fair Lawn High School (in 1991 and 1998), Lyncrest Elementary School (2016) and Henry B. Milnes Elementary School (2020) as Blue Ribbon Schools.

Public school students from the borough, and all of Bergen County, are eligible to attend the secondary education programs offered by the Bergen County Technical Schools, which include the Bergen County Academies in Hackensack, and the Bergen Tech campus in Teterboro or Paramus. The district offers programs on a shared-time or full-time basis, with admission based on a selective application process and tuition covered by the student's home school district.

St. Anne School is a Catholic elementary school that operates under the supervision of the Roman Catholic Archdiocese of Newark.

== Emergency services ==
Fair Lawn has an all-volunteer fire department. The department has four stations—Company 1 on George Street, Company 2 at Route 208 South (before Maple Avenue Bridge), Company 3 located at the corner of Plaza Road and Rosalie Street and Company 4 on Radburn Road. Fair Lawn residents are served by the all volunteer Fair Lawn Volunteer Ambulance, Inc., which provides 24/7 emergency medical services. This service is equipped with four state of the art ambulances stocked with all necessary supplies to handle any medical emergency. Fair Lawn is also served by the all-volunteer Fair Lawn Rescue Squad. The squad provides heavy rescue and hazardous materials (HAZMAT) services to the residents and businesses of the borough.

Fair Lawn also has a police department that was founded in 1930. In 2014, the department responded to over 400 calls.

== Transportation ==
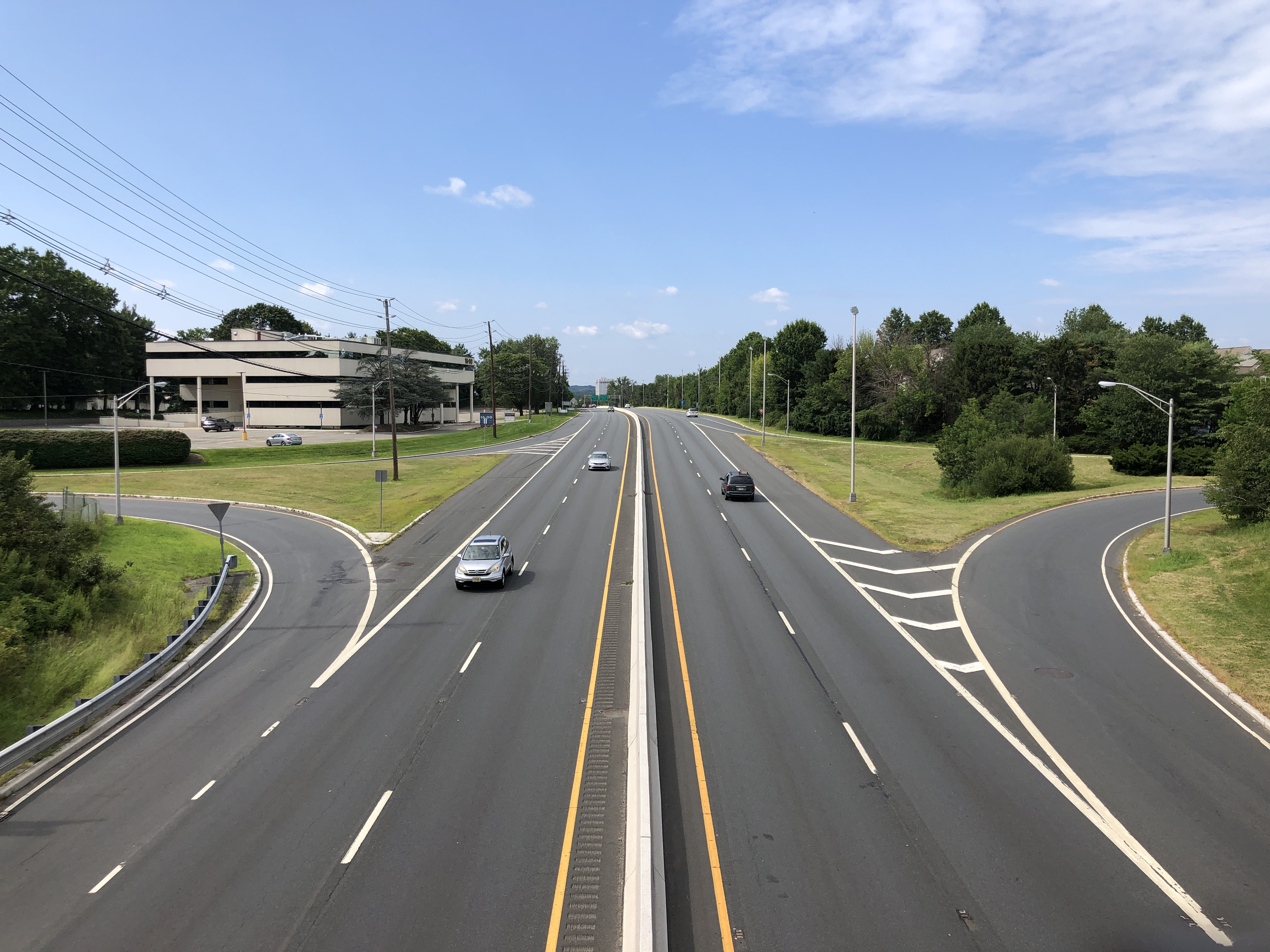
Route 208 in Fair Lawn

=== Roads ===
Fair Lawn is interwoven by a robust network of roads. As of May 2010, the borough had a total of 99.60 miles (160.29 km) of roadways, of which 84.00 miles (135.18 km) were maintained by the municipality, 11.13 miles (17.91 km) by Bergen County and 4.47 miles (7.19 km) by the New Jersey Department of Transportation.

Fair Lawn is traversed by two state highways, New Jersey Route 4, which connects Fair Lawn to New York City via the George Washington Bridge, and New Jersey Route 208, which links Fair Lawn to the New York City bypass highway Interstate 287.

Fair Lawn has several main roads crossing through it forming a rough 3x3 grid. Running north–south are Saddle River Road, Plaza Road, and River Road (County Route 507) while Broadway, Morlot Avenue, and Fair Lawn Avenue run east–west, and Route 208 runs northwest–southeast. Running east–west between and parallel to Morlot and Fair Lawn Avenues is Berdan Avenue, a residential thoroughfare which is bisected by Route 208 into two discontinuous segments, the western one of which contains Fair Lawn High School.

Broadway becomes Route 4 heading into Paramus and is less than 10 miles (16 km) from the George Washington Bridge.

Fair Lawn Avenue is considered the borough's main street, containing its borough hall, police station, and public library. The road goes west over the Passaic River into Paterson, and on the east, Fair Lawn Avenue ends at Saddle River Road, which through Dunkerhook Park becomes Dunkerhook Road, and becomes Century Road once in Paramus, at Paramus Road. The intersection of Fair Lawn Avenue and Plaza Road form what could be considered a "town center", with several shopping plazas and the Radburn train station all within walking distance. In October 2015, a community meeting was held to discuss a vision for this corridor. Other commercial areas include Broadway and River Road.

Route 208 has its southern terminus in Fair Lawn and bisects the borough from the northwest to the southeast, where it eventually merges with Broadway to become Route 4 just west of Fair Lawn's border with Paramus. Taken the other direction, Route 208 flows northwest to Interstate 287 in Oakland. Numerous commercial establishments and office buildings line Route 208 along the northwestern half of this limited access highway's trajectory through Fair Lawn.

South of Route 4, Saddle River Road goes through the eastern side of Fair Lawn and into Saddle Brook, where it provides a link to both the Garden State Parkway and Interstate 80. North of Route 4, Saddle River Road provides a link to Glen Rock.

==== Grid-based address system ====
Fair Lawn uses a street address numbering system in which most Fair Lawn addresses are given hyphenated numbers. The address of the borough's public library, for example, is 10-01 Fair Lawn Ave. Less than 1% of addresses in New Jersey use this kind of numbering system and Fair Lawn's nearly 10,000 hyphenated addresses account for nearly half of them. This numbering system is also used in Queens, New York City. Exceptions to this numbering system generally exist on the Glen Rock, Hawthorne, and Saddle Brook sides of Fair Lawn and within the Radburn development. The system, dating at least as far back as the 1930s, was designed to allow emergency personnel to quickly locate addresses.

The first numbers (before the dash) correspond to block-distances from Broadway (on streets that run North-South) and to the numbered streets in the borough (example: 2nd Street, 17th Street, etc.) on the streets that run East-West; with the highest numbers being in the low 40s, and the lowest numbers being 0–30, etc. Addresses south of Broadway / Route 4 start with a zero and a hyphen, which can cause confusion with those unfamiliar with the grid system. Most GPS systems and online address entry forms do not accept the dash, though addresses entered without the dash are typically handled properly.

=== Public transportation ===
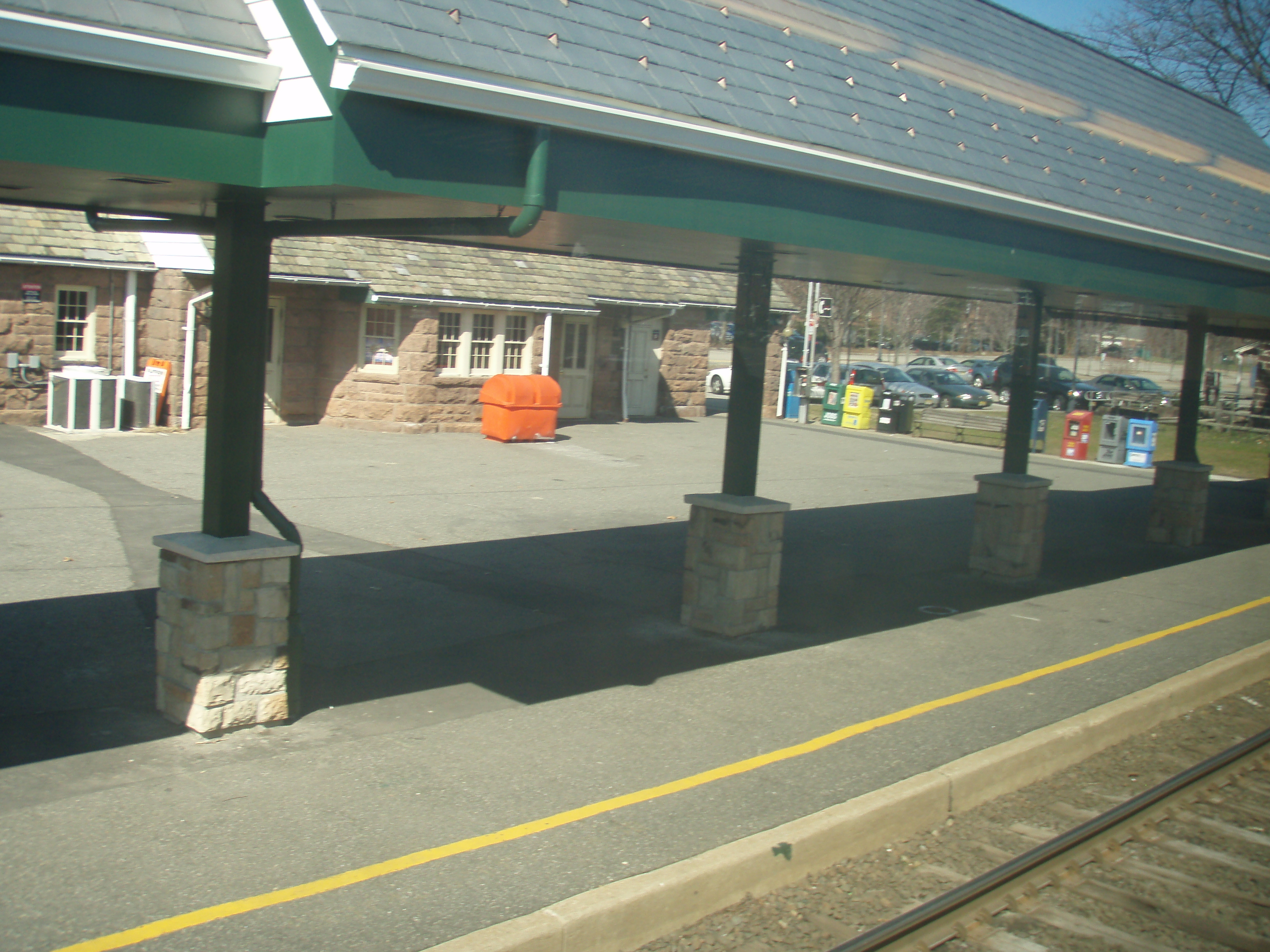
Radburn train station in Fair Lawn

Fair Lawn is served by the Radburn and Broadway train stations on the NJ Transit Bergen County Line, which offers service to Lower Manhattan via the Hoboken Terminal, and connections at Secaucus Junction to New York Penn Station in Midtown Manhattan and to most other NJ Transit train lines.

NJ Transit buses include the 144, 145, 148, 160, 164 and 196 routes to the Port Authority Bus Terminal in Midtown Manhattan; the 171 and 175 to the George Washington Bridge Bus Terminal; and the 746, 758 and 770 lines, offering local service.

Spanish Transportation and its jitney buses / guaguas operate out of its terminal located one block from the NJ Transit Paterson Terminal on Broadway in downtown Paterson. The two lines, the Broadway and Main Street jitneys, begin at its respective Main Terminal on Broadway, with the Broadway-Washington Heights line heading west on Broadway with frequent local stops then continuing onto Route 4 before crossing the George Washington Bridge and dropping commuters off in front of the George Washington Bridge Bus Terminal with access to the A Train. The Main Street-42nd Street route heads south down Main Street and makes frequent local stops through Clifton and Passaic, then makes sporadic non-local stops until undergoing the Lincoln Tunnel, dropping commuters off via 42nd Street in front of the Port Authority Bus Terminal.

=== Aviation ===
Fair Lawn lies 20 miles (32 km) north of Newark Liberty International Airport, approaches to which are directly over Fair Lawn, and 8 miles (13 km) northwest of Teterboro Airport. John F. Kennedy International Airport is 30 miles (48 km) away and LaGuardia Airport is located 22 miles (35 km) to the east, both located in New York City.

== Popular culture ==
- In the 1976 film Taxi Driver, when Travis Bickle (Robert De Niro) is talking to a Secret Service agent, he provides a false name (Henry Krinkle), and a false address (154 Hopper Avenue, Fair Lawn, New Jersey). There is a Hopper Avenue in Fair Lawn, but 154 Hopper Avenue does not exist, and the ZIP Code he provides is also incorrect (61045, which is actually in Kings, Illinois).
- In 1981 punk rock band The Misfits, who later became one of the original pioneers of hardcore punk, recorded their studio demo titled "The Fairlawn Sessions" at New Found Sound Studio with original singer Glen Danzig.
- In the 1996 Mel Gibson movie Ransom, Fair Lawn is seen when Gibson is told to turn from Route 4 onto Saddle River Road (Fair Lawn) and into the rock quarry (which is actually located in Haledon, New Jersey).
- In the 2004 movie Taxi, Fair Lawn can be seen on the map that Detective Washburn (Jimmy Fallon) is reading. The map is fake, since it shows a fictional uncompleted highway off the Garden State Parkway in Oradell.
- At the beginning of the "Pine Barrens" episode of the television series The Sopranos, Mob boss Tony Soprano tells Paulie Walnuts and protege Christopher Moltisanti to visit a Russian mobster, Valery, in Fair Lawn. However, this scene was shot in Paterson. A scene in the episode "The Happy Wanderer" was filmed in front of the historic Radburn Building.
- Fair Lawn was featured in the movie The Other Guys starring Will Ferrell and Mark Wahlberg. The two main characters travel to Fair Lawn, New Jersey to get accounting files.

== Notable people ==
People who were born in, residents of, or otherwise closely associated with Fair Lawn include:

- Tom Acker (1930–2021), former Major League Baseball pitcher who played for the Cincinnati Reds
- Matt Ahearn (born 1959), former member of the New Jersey General Assembly who represented the 38th Legislative District from 2002–2004
- Ian Axel (born 1985), singer-songwriter, pianist, and member of the band A Great Big World
- Jeffrey Boam (1946–2000), screenwriter best known for Indiana Jones and the Last Crusade and Lethal Weapon 2 and 3
- Steve Bornstein (born 1952), President and CEO of the NFL Network
- Brendan Burke (born 1984), sportscaster for the Utica Comets
- Anthony Campanile (born 1982), linebackers coach for the Miami Dolphins and former defensive backs coach for Boston College
- Nunzio Campanile, football coach who is the offensive coordinator for the UConn Huskies football team
- Robbie Chosen (born 1993), former NFL wide receiver
- Gérard Debaets (1899–1959), Belgian racing cyclist
- Russell Dermond (1936–2015), sprint canoer who competed in the 1956 and 1960 Olympics
- John E. Dohms (1948–2012), researcher of the pathology of avian diseases
- Barry Edelstein (born 1965), theatre director, author, and educator who serves as Artistic Director of the Old Globe Theatre in San Diego, California
- W. Cary Edwards (1944–2010), politician who served as the Attorney General of New Jersey from 1986 to 1989
- Steven Ehrlich (born 1946), architect who is the founding partner of the practice Ehrlich Yanai Rhee Chaney Architects, formerly known as Ehrlich Architects
- Tracy Eisser (born 1989), rower who won the gold medal in the quad sculls at the 2015 World Rowing Championships and competed at the Olympics
- Peter Elbow (1935–2025), academic who was a professor of English at the University of Massachusetts Amherst
- Philip Ettinger (born 1985), actor known for his roles in First Reformed (2017), Tyrel (2018) and in the 2020 film The Evening Hour
- Donald Fagen (born 1948), singer-songwriter and co-founder and lead singer of Steely Dan
- Nicholas Felice (1927–2021), politician who served in the New Jersey General Assembly and was mayor of Fair Lawn
- Jim Finn (born 1976), football player with the New York Giants
- Helene Fortunoff (1933–2021), businessperson who headed Fortunoff
- David Gewirtz, CNN columnist, cyberterrorism adviser and presidential scholar
- Robert M. Gordon (born 1950), member of the New Jersey Senate since 2008, who served in the New Jersey General Assembly from 2004 to 2008 and was mayor of Fair Lawn from 1988 to 1991
- Neal Gottlieb (born 1977), ice cream entrepreneur who founded Three Twins organic ice cream
- Boris Gulko (born 1947), International Grandmaster and former winner of the U.S. Chess Championship
- Larry Hochman (born 1953), orchestrator and composer who won four Emmy Awards for his original music on the TV series Wonder Pets! and a Tony Award for his orchestrations for The Book of Mormon
- Šaćir Hot (born 1991), soccer player for the New York Red Bulls, the United States U-20 team, and Boston College; attended Fair Lawn High School
- Bruce Jankowski (born 1949), retired wide receiver who played in the NFL for the Kansas City Chiefs
- Allen Kay (1945–2022), advertising executive
- Julia Knitel (born 1993), actress and singer, best known for her work in the theatre
- Sally Kornbluth (born 1960), cell biologist and academic administrator, serving as the 18th president of the Massachusetts Institute of Technology
- Naomi Kutin (born 2001), world record-setting powerlifter
- George Lefferts (1921–2018), writer, producer, playwright, poet, and director
- Steve Malzberg (born 1959), radio host
- Pellegrino Matarazzo (born 1977), professional soccer coach who is currently the manager of VfB Stuttgart
- Mike Meola (1905–1976), pitcher in Major League Baseball who played between the 1933 and 1936 seasons
- Lee Meredith (born 1947 as Judi-Lee Sauls), actress who appeared in The Producers, Hello Down There and The Sunshine Boys
- The Kid Mero (born 1983), Writer, comedian, TV personality, voice actor, YouTube personality, music blogger and Twitter personality
- Jillian Morgese (born 1989), actress
- Mary Gordon Murray (born 1953), actress and singer who was nominated for a Tony Award for Best Actress in a Musical for Little Me
- Millie Perkins (born 1938), actress, who played the title role in her first film as the star of The Diary of Anne Frank
- Ron Perranoski (1936–2020), Major League Baseball pitcher from 1961-1973
- Philip Plotch (born 1961), author, professor and transportation planner
- Billy Price (born 1949), soul singer
- Maurice Purtill (1916–1994), drummer in the Big Band era, most notably the Glenn Miller Orchestra
- Sarah-Nicole Robles (born 1991), actress and voice actress, best known for providing the voice of Luz Noceda in the Disney Channel animated series The Owl House
- Roberta Rogow (born 1942), writer of speculative fiction and fan fiction, and a filk music singer-songwriter
- Steve Rothman (born 1952), Congressman who represented New Jersey's 9th congressional district from 1997–2013
- Ira Rubin (1930–2013), world champion professional contract bridge player
- C. Gus Rys (c. 1912–1980), politician who was mayor of Fair Lawn and served three terms in the New Jersey General Assembly
- Amy Scheer, professional sports executive who is Senior Vice President of Business Operations for the Professional Women's Hockey League
- Charlie Schlatter (born 1966), actor
- Loren Schoenberg (born 1958), jazz musician, conductor and educator who is founding director of the National Jazz Museum in Harlem
- Dave Sime (1936–2016), sprinter who won a silver medal in the 100m dash at the 1960 Summer Olympics in Rome
- Regina Spektor (born 1980), singer
- Brendan Suhr (born 1951), Director of Program Development for the UCF Knights men's basketball team and former NBA scout and assistant coach
- Lisa Swain (born 1958), former mayor of Fair Lawn who has represented the 38th Legislative District in the New Jersey General Assembly since 2018
- Steve Swallow (born 1940), jazz double bassist and bass guitarist
- Helen Van Wyk, (1930-1994), Artist, author and PBS television host
- Donna Vivino (born 1978), stage and screen actress, who has performed the starring role of Elphaba in the Broadway National Tour production of Wicked
- Reginald Weir (1911–1987), African-American tennis player and physician
- Julius Wiggins (1928–2001), publisher and founder of Silent News, the first newspaper for the deaf
- Ben Younger (born 1977), screenwriter and director of films including Boiler Room, Bleed for This and Prime
- Benjamin Yudin (born 1944), Rabbi and founder of Congregation Shomrei Torah in Fair Lawn
- Herb Zarrow (1925–2008), magician who created the Zarrow shuffle

== Historic sites ==
The Passaic River Fishing Weir is a prominent archaeological feature just north of the Fair Lawn Avenue Bridge. It was constructed by Lenape tribe members and is the best-preserved of several such weirs on the Passaic River.

Fair Lawn is home to the following locations on the National Register of Historic Places:

- G. V. H. Berdan House – 1219 River Road (added 1983)
- Richard J. Berdan House – 24-07 Fair Lawn Avenue (added 1983): Purchased by Richard J. Berdan in 1808, the home was constructed for the Bogert family c. 1750.
- Cadmus-Folly House – 19-21 Fair Lawn Avenue (added 1983)
- Peter Garretson House – 4-02 River Road (added 1974): With a homestead that dates back to 1719, the sandstone house is one of the oldest surviving structures in Bergen County. The Garretson Forge and Farm Restoration operates the site, owned by the county, as a farm museum.
- Naugle House – 42-49 Dunkerhook Road (added 1983): Constructed in 1776, the home was visited by the Marquis de Lafayette. The site was purchased by the borough in 2010 for $1.7 million, and a plan has been formulated to repair the home and preserve the grounds as open space.
- Radburn – Irregular pattern between Radburn Road and Erie RR. tracks (added 1975)
- Radburn station – Pollitt Drive (added 1984)
- Jacob Vanderbeck Jr. House – 41-25 Dunkerhook Road (added 1983): Constructed in Dutch stone by Jacob Vanderbeck in the 1750s, the house has had a number of prominent owners, including Fair Lawn mayor and Assemblyman Richard Vander Plaat. Owned by a developer who has sought to use the site to construct a large-scale assisted-living facility, the house has been listed on Preservation New Jersey's 2013 list of the 10 Most Endangered Historic Places in New Jersey.

Fair Lawn also has a close association with two historic areas along the Saddle River in Paramus. One is the Easton Tower, a Bergen County historic site that consists of a stone tower and a small dam which mark the site of the colonial-era Jacob Zabriskie mill and the 19th–20th centuries-era Arcola community park. Another is the Dunkerhook community, focused around the New Jersey designated historic road, Dunkerhook Road. The western section of the community includes the Naugle House and the Jacob Vanderbeck Jr. House, and the eastern section included a slave and free-African American community that consisted of a school, a cemetery, a church, and houses including the now-demolished Zabriskie Tenant House.
