= Julius Wiggins =

Julius H. Wiggins (September 19, 1928 – October 13, 2001) was the founder of Silent News, the first newspaper for the deaf.

== Personal life ==
He was born in North York, Ontario, Canada, and attended Belleville School for the Deaf in Belleville, Ontario. Later he transferred to a vocational school focusing on tailoring skills. Once he was at the trade school, his father who was in the fur business saw much potential in Julius. His father then took him under his wing and they began working alongside another. Later he met Harriet Berkowitz in New York City at a deaf event; he then asked for her hand in marriage. They married on March 23, 1952. Harriet and Julius worked hand in hand in the production of Silent News. They were married for 49 years and had three children. He loved to travel with his family. Throughout his life, they explored many different countries. He believed that high visibility was key to gathering information for the newspaper (Trudy). He was active in promoting organizations to the deaf community. The organizations he was a part of include "Temple Beth Or of the Deaf in Queens New York", the Philadelphia Hebrew Association of the Deaf, New York Hebrew Association of the Deaf, and Brooklyn Hebrew Society of the Deaf. He was not only active in the organizations listed above he was also a member of the National Association of the Deaf and the National Fraternal Society of the Deaf.

== Career ==
At 20 years of age, Wiggins moved to New York City to further his career in the fur business and worked at the Manhattan fur district. It was hard for him as a deaf man to have equal opportunities in the workplace. But with his dedication and determination, he worked his way to the top of his company. Once the fur market plummeted, he became unemployed. Later he found a job at a postal service. He found the job to be tedious and was ridiculed by his hearing co-workers. It was not until he took a family trip that his career path dramatically changed. On the family vacation, he saw a sign that said, "Who, What, Where, and Why." That inspired him with ideas for the future of the deaf community. He was able to get 10 of his closest deaf friends together to organize and fund a paper company geared towards the deaf and hard of hearing community that would soon be known as Silent News. Each invested $250.00 into the company (Rachel). Soon after, Silent News was born in January 1969. Each issue was 15 cents. His family played a vital role in the production of the newspaper in the first year. The headquarters for the newspaper were in Mount Laurel, New Jersey. Wiggins held a huge role in connecting the deaf community and allowing them to be aware of upcoming events and news. The newspaper brought national and international news, latest technology, health and sports, and stories about successful and up in coming deaf people. Later he wrote an autobiography called No Sound, published in 1972, which recounted in depth about many hardships he encountered with hearing individuals and the oppression he felt throughout his life (Trudy). Silent News has left an everlasting footprint for the future of the deaf community. In the 1990s due to his failing health the newspaper was sold to Adele Wiggins. Soon after he died on October 13, 2001.

=== Silent News ===
Wiggins and his family moved from North York, Ontario to a home in Fair Lawn, New Jersey, where they intended to start a newspaper for the deaf. The first issue of Silent News was launched on January 1, 1969, its focus being to bring awareness to events, news, sports, etc. for the deaf. The newspaper would have about 7,000 subscribers per month but in actuality more than 30,000 would be reading (Jamie). This was due to people passing around the paper. This hindered the newspaper greatly; it did not allow the newspaper he profit to succeed. Even though the newspaper struggled throughout the years it managed to survive and outlast its competition. With the technological advances, Silent News began to expand to the web. The subscribers decreased soon after and in return Silent News came to an end. Silent News changed the life of many deaf people throughout the years. It was an iconic media device. It was the first media outlet geared towards the deaf, opening the door to many other media outlets for the deaf.
