= Fair Lawn High School =

High school in Bergen County, New Jersey, US

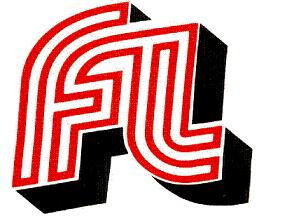

Location
- 14-00 Berdan Avenue; Fair Lawn, Bergen County, New Jersey 07410; United States; 40.93266°N 74.125372°W

Information
- Type: Public high school
- Established: September 1943
- NCES School ID: 340498000410
- Principal: Paul Gorski
- Faculty: 124.7 FTEs
- Enrollment: 1,687 (as of 2024–25)
- Student to teacher ratio: 13.5:1
- Colors: Crimson and Gray
- Athletics conference: Big North Conference (general); North Jersey Super Football Conference (football)
- Mascot: Captain Cutter
- Team name: Cutters
- Newspaper: Crimson Crier
- Yearbook: Crimson Tide
- Website: flhs.fairlawnschools.org

Fair Lawn High School is a four-year comprehensive public high school serving students in ninth through twelfth grades, located in Fair Lawn, Bergen County, in the U.S. state of New Jersey, operating as the lone secondary school of the Fair Lawn Public Schools.

As of the 2024–25 school year, the school had an enrollment of 1,687 students and 124.7 classroom teachers (on an FTE basis), for a student–teacher ratio of 13.5:1. There were 168 students (10.0% of enrollment) eligible for free lunch and 190 (11.3% of students) eligible for reduced-cost lunch.

== History ==
Approved in June 1941, construction of the building was delayed due to World War II and the challenges it caused in obtaining the materials needed to complete the project. The school, constructed at a cost of $700,000 (equivalent to $13 million in 2025), opened in September 1943 with nearly 900 students in seventh through eleventh grades in a building with 29 classrooms and a capacity to serve a maximum enrollment of 1,070 students. Those students from Fair Lawn in twelfth grade who had previously attended Hawthorne High School, Paterson Central High School or Ridgewood High School completed their studies at their receiving school through graduation.

== Awards, recognition and rankings ==
For the 1990–91 and 1997–98 school years, Fair Lawn High School received the National Blue Ribbon Award of Excellence from the United States Department of Education, the highest honor that an American school can achieve.

In 1998, the school's principal was named the State Principal of the Year by the New Jersey Principals and Supervisors Association in recognition of her work, which included being the principal of the only public high school in New Jersey (as of that time) to have won two Blue Ribbon Awards for Excellence.

In its 2013 report on "America's Best High Schools," The Daily Beast ranked the school 876th in the nation among participating public high schools and 66th among schools in New Jersey. In 2012, Newsweek ranked FLHS in the top 4% of high schools in the nation based on how hard schools challenge their students with Advanced Placement and college level courses. In the 2011 "Ranking America's High Schools" issue by The Washington Post, the school was ranked 58th in New Jersey and 1,691st nationwide. In Newsweek's May 22, 2007, issue, ranking the country's top high schools, Fair Lawn High School was listed in 808th place, the 19th-highest ranked school in New Jersey.

The school was the 70th-ranked public high school in New Jersey out of 339 schools statewide in New Jersey Monthly magazine's September 2014 cover story on the state's "Top Public High Schools," using a new ranking methodology. The school had been ranked 65th in the state of 328 schools in 2012, after being ranked 76th in 2010 out of 322 schools listed. The magazine ranked the school 81st in 2008 out of 316 schools. The school was ranked 62nd in the magazine's September 2006 issue, which included 316 schools across the state. Schooldigger.com ranked the school tied for 72nd out of 381 public high schools statewide in its 2011 rankings (a decrease of 7 positions from the 2010 ranking) which were based on the combined percentage of students classified as proficient or above proficient on the mathematics (89.3%) and language arts literacy (96.8%) components of the High School Proficiency Assessment (HSPA).

== Clubs ==
Fair Lawn High School has an active extracurricular program encompassing diverse interests. The school has an award-winning musical theater program, as well as shows performed by the Masques (drama group), the Boptones (school rock band), and the orchestra.

The Fair Lawn High School musical won a Rising Star Award for Best overall production in 2004 for their production of Company. In 2009, the school also received the Metropolitan High School Theatre Award for their production of Thoroughly Modern Millie.

On November 11, 2006, the Fair Lawn High School Marching Band and Color Guard won the Class IV national championship in percussion at the 2006 United States National Marching Band Championships held in Annapolis, Maryland, at the Navy–Marine Corps Memorial Stadium. The color guard also placed fourth. The team finished third overall in Group IV with a score of 94.225.

Both Junior and Senior Math Leagues do well in state and national competitions. The Senior Math League swept the Bergen County Math League earning the first, second, and third place individual scores in 1999-2000. Other successful teams include the Chemistry League, Academic Decathlon, Debate Team, and Computer League.

Another club in the school is Future Business Leaders of America (FBLA). Many students represent Fair Lawn High School at conferences around the nation every year and bring back many awards. Fair Lawn High School is known to be a strong FBLA chapter and students run for NJ FBLA state office consistently.

The Model United Nations delegation of Fair Lawn High School is one of the top delegations in New Jersey, and has named the Best Delegation at the AMUN Conference the last six years. Unlike other clubs, Model UN is solely funded through the delegates.

The Student Government is a large part of all student activities and is at the base of many school-sponsored events.

== Marching band ==
The Fair Lawn High School Marching Band placed third at the United States National Marching Band Championships in Annapolis, Maryland in 2006, winning Best Percussion.

== Athletics ==
The Fair Lawn High School Cutters compete in the Big North Conference, which is comprised of public and private high schools in Bergen and Passaic counties, and was established following a reorganization of sports leagues in Northern New Jersey by the New Jersey State Interscholastic Athletic Association (NJSIAA). On an interim basis, the school competed in the North Jersey Tri-County Conference for the 2009-10 season. Prior to the realignment, the school participated in the North Bergen Interscholastic Athletic League (NBIL/NBIAL). With 1,102 students in grades 10-12, the school was classified by the NJSIAA for the 2019–20 school year as Group IV for most athletic competition purposes, which included schools with an enrollment of 1,060 to 5,049 students in that grade range. The football team competes in the Ivy White division of the North Jersey Super Football Conference, which includes 112 schools competing in 20 divisions, making it the nation's biggest football-only high school sports league. The football team is one of the 12 programs assigned to the two Ivy divisions starting in 2020, which are intended to allow weaker programs ineligible for playoff participation to compete primarily against each other. The school was classified by the NJSIAA as Group IV North for football for 2024–2026, which included schools with 893 to 1,315 students.

The school participates as the host school / lead agency for a joint ice hockey team with Bergenfield High School and Dumont High School. The co-op program operates under agreements scheduled to expire at the end of the 2023–24 school year.

Teams marked with an asterisk (*), although they officially compete and score as separate teams, usually have their events and practices with each other. Depending on the sport, there is at most a Varsity, Junior Varsity, and Freshman team. Some sports do not have all three levels.

- Fall sports teams: Cheerleading, Cross country (boys/girls)*, Football, Soccer (boys/girls), Tennis (girls), and Volleyball (girls)
- Winter sports teams: Cheerleading, Basketball (boys/girls), Bowling (boys/girls)*, Ice hockey, Swimming (boys/girls)*, Track (boys/girls)*, Wrestling and Fencing (boys/girls)*, Dance
- Spring sports teams: Baseball (boys), Softball (girls), Track (boys/girls)*, Tennis (boys), Lacrosse (boys/girls), Volleyball (boys)

The girls volleyball team won the Group IV state championship in 1985 (against runner-up Hackensack High School in the final match), 1989 (vs. Paramus Catholic High School) and 1997 (vs. Immaculate Heart Academy), and in Group III in 2007 (vs. West Morris Mendham High School). The 1985 team won the Group IV title with a 15–9, 15–9 win against a Hackensack team that came into the finals undefeated. Entering the 2007 Group III tournament as the 11th seed, the team won the final match in three sets against West Morris Mendham.

The wrestling team won the North I Group IV state sectional title in 1987-1990, 1992, 2000 and 2001. The boys wrestling team was started in 1947 by Frank Bennett, who also founded the wrestling program at Washington High School (now Warren Hills Regional High School) and has been inducted in the National Wrestling Hall of Fame.

The boys volleyball team won the state championship in 1995 (defeating Bridgewater-Raritan High School in the final match of the tournament), 2011 (vs. Southern Regional High School) and 2012 (vs. Southern Regional). The program's three state titles are tied for fourth-most in the state. The boys volleyball team won its first-ever NJSIAA state championship in 1995, finishing with a 25–1 record. The No. 2 seeded Cutters defeated No. 1 and previously undefeated Bridgewater-Raritan High School, in Bridgewater, 2–1 (15–13, 13–15, 15–13), making it the first North Jersey team to ever win the state title. The 2011 team was top-ranked in the state by The Star-Ledger and won the state title, defeating Southern Regional High School in straight sets by scores of 25–17 and 25–23.

The ice hockey team won the McMullen Cup in 2003. Since the ice hockey team's inception in 2001, they have compiled an overall record of 152-72-27. They have qualified for the state playoffs in every single season and in 2008 they were the #1 ranked public school in the state of New Jersey.

The boys tennis team won the 2007 North I, Group III state sectional championship with a 3–2 win over Ramapo High School.

== Administration ==
As of 2025, the school's principal is Paul Gorski. His administration team includes a vice principal, two assistant principals and the athletic director.

== Notable alumni ==
- Tom Acker (1930–2021, class of 1948), Major League Baseball (MLB) pitcher who played for the Cincinnati Reds
- Ian Axel (born 1985, class of 2003), singer-songwriter, pianist and member of A Great Big World
- Anthony Campanile (born 1982, class of 2001), National Football League (NFL) and NCAA football positional coach, who coached the Fair Lawn HS football team in 2006
- Ben Davis (born 1945), professional American football cornerback and return specialist for ten years in the NFL
- John E. Dohms (1948-2012, class of 1966), researcher of the pathology of avian diseases and a faculty member of the University of Delaware
- Barry Edelstein (born 1965, class of 1982), theatre director, author, and educator who serves as artistic director of the Old Globe Theatre in San Diego, California
- Tracy Eisser (born 1989), rower who won the gold medal in the quad sculls at the 2015 World Rowing Championships and was selected to compete as part of the United States team at the 2016 Summer Olympics
- Helene Fortunoff (1933–2021), businessperson who headed Fortunoff
- Šaćir Hot (born 1991), former professional soccer defender who is head coach of FC Motown of the National Premier Soccer League and USL League Two
- Bruce Jankowski (born 1949), wide receiver who played for the Kansas City Chiefs from 1971 to 1972
- Allen Kay (1945–2022), advertising executive and businessman who created the "If You See Something, Say Something" advertising campaign for the Metropolitan Transportation Authority
- Julia Knitel, actress and singer, best known for her work in the theatre
- Sally Kornbluth (born 1960), cell biologist and academic administrator, serving as the 18th president of the Massachusetts Institute of Technology
- Pellegrino Matarazzo (born 1977, class of 1995), professional soccer coach
- Jillian Morgese (born 1989, class of 2007), actress who appeared in the 2002 film Much Ado About Nothing
- Millie Perkins (born 1938), actress best known for playing the title role in the 1959 movie The Diary of Anne Frank
- Ron Perranoski (1936–2020), MLB pitcher and coach, mostly for the Los Angeles Dodgers
- Amy Scheer, professional sports executive who is general manager of the Connecticut Whale of the Premier Hockey Federation
- Charlie Schlatter (born 1966, class of 1984), actor who has played in 18 Again! and as a regular in Diagnosis: Murder
- Loren Schoenberg (born 1958), jazz musician, conductor and educator who is founding director of the National Jazz Museum in Harlem
- Dave Sime (1936-2016, class of 1954), sprinter who won a silver medal in the 100-meter dash at the 1960 Olympic Games
- Regina Spektor (born 1980, class of 1998), singer-songwriter and pianist
- Donna Vivino (born 1978), Broadway actress who has played the role of Elphaba in the national tour of Wicked

== Notable faculty ==
- Hubie Brown (born 1933), NBA basketball coach, who coached the school's basketball team in the 1960s
- Bob Gottlieb (1940–2014), NCAA basketball coach, who coached the school's basketball team in the 1967–68 school year
