= Ma'ayanot Yeshiva High School =

Private high school in Bergen County, New Jersey, United States

Location
- 1650 Palisade Avenue; Teaneck, Bergen County, New Jersey 07666; United States
- 40.907202°N 74.002355°W

Information
- Type: Private High School, Yeshiva
- NCES School ID: A1101504
- Faculty: 37.5 FTEs
- Grades: 9-12
- Enrollment: 311 (as of 2021–22)
- Student to teacher ratio: 8.3:1
- Team name: Rapids
- Tuition: $26,450 (for 2024–25)
- Affiliation: Modern Orthodox Judaism
- Website: www.maayanot.org

The Ma'ayanot Yeshiva High School for Girls is a private Jewish day school for young women in grades nine through twelve, located in Teaneck, in Bergen County, in the U.S. state of New Jersey, serving the Orthodox communities of Bergen County and neighboring areas. The school has been accredited by the Middle States Association of Colleges and Schools Commission on Elementary and Secondary Schools since 2002 and is accredited through July 2027.

The school was started in 1996 and has the stated aim of inculcating values of Ahavat Torah (love of Torah) and Yirat Shamayim (fear of God). The founding principal was Esther Krauss and the current principal is CB Neugroschl.

As of the 2021–22 school year, the school had an enrollment of 311 students and 37.5 classroom teachers (on an FTE basis), for a student–teacher ratio of 8.3:1. The school's student body was 100% White.

== Notable alumnae ==
- Naomi Kutin (born 2001), powerlifter who has set numerous records in the sport at several weight classes since starting her career at the age of 8.
