= Naomi Kutin =

American powerlifter (born 2001)

Naomi Chaya Kutin (born September 23, 2001 in Mount Kisco, New York) is an American powerlifter who has set numerous records in the sport at several weight classes since starting her career at the age of 8. Her accomplishments as a Modern Orthodox Jewish woman in a field predominantly populated by men was the subject of the 2016 documentary Supergirl.

== Early life ==
Raised in Fair Lawn, New Jersey, Kutin is the daughter of Ed Kutin, a fellow powerlifter of Ashkenazi Jewish background, and Neshama (Weber) Kutin, a Colorado native of English, Irish, Scottish, Welsh, and German background. Kutin's mother, who was raised Pentecostal Christian before converting to Judaism in adulthood, wanted her daughter to participate in activities like powerlifting that would make her an empowered woman.

Kutin attended Yeshivat Noam in Paramus, New Jersey and was a member of the class of 2019 at Ma'ayanot Yeshiva High School in Teaneck. She speaks English and Hebrew. Kutin, after high school, spent one year studying abroad on a gap year program in Israel by the name of Machon Maayan; she took a year to focus on personal growth before attending Rutgers University in New Brunswick, NJ. She is currently a graduate student at Rutgers University.

== Powerlifting ==
Kutin began powerlifting at the age of 8 while attending Yeshivat Noam. At the age of 9 and weighing 88 pounds (40 kg), Kutin broke the world record for the 97 pounds (44 kg) weight class when she squatted 205 pounds (93 kg).

A documentary film about her, titled Supergirl, premiered in 2016 at the Hamptons International Film Festival. Director Jessie Auritt was drawn to her story after reading about her accomplishments as an Orthodox Jewish woman in a male-dominated sport. The documentary depicts Kutin's training regimen, religious life (including her bat mitzvah), chronic migraines, and learning to deal with high expectations. In December 2017, it made its U.S. television debut as part of the long-running PBS documentary series Independent Lens.

As of December 2017, she has "current personal bests of a 321 lbs Squat, 127 lbs bench and 363 lbs deadlift," per Auritt.

As of 2021, Kutin is an active member of the powerlifting team at Rutgers University.
