= John E. Dohms =

John Edward Dohms, Ph.D. (April 5, 1948, New York City - September, 2012, Newark, Delaware) was a researcher of the pathology of avian diseases and a faculty member of the University of Delaware.

Dohms was the son of Herbert S. and Jean E. (née Pardee) Dohms of Crystal Falls, Michigan. He grew up in Fair Lawn, New Jersey and graduated from Fair Lawn High School in 1966. He then studied at and graduated from Bowling Green State University with B.S. (1970) and M.S. (1972) degrees in biology and went on to earn his Ph.D. in Veterinary Microbiology from Ohio State University in 1977, writing a thesis under the direction of Y. M. Saif. He was a member of the faculty in the Department of Animal and Food Sciences at the University of Delaware from 1977 to 2009 and held the rank of Professor of Microbiology of Infectious Diseases.

== Personal life ==
Dohms was an avid athlete and outdoorsman, and an All-American lacrosse player while a student at Bowling Green State University.

== Disappearance and death ==
Suffering from a form of dementia, Dohms disappeared from his home in Newark, Delaware, on September 13, 2012. Despite an exhaustive police search, Dohms could not be located. A hiker discovered human remains in a wooded area on February 28, 2014, that were identified as belonging to Dohms. He was remembered by his former colleagues who arranged for the placement of a memorial marker near the location where his remains were discovered.

== Publications ==
Dohms' research focused on the pathology of avian disease, including the study of avian mycoplasm.

- [Ph.D. thesis]. 1977. Studies on the metabolism and passive transfer of immunoglobulins in the domestic turkey. Ohio State University. Department of Poultry Science. Under the direction of Y. M. Saif.
- 1991. Dohms, John E., and Alan Metz. "Stress—mechanisms of immunosuppression." Veterinary Immunology and Immunopathology 30.1:89-109.
- 1996. Keeler, C. L., et al. "Cloning and characterization of a putative cytadhesin gene (mgc1) from Mycoplasma gallisepticum." Infection and immunity 64.5:1541-1547.
- 2005. Travis W Bliss, John E Dohms, Marlene G Emara, Calvin L Keeler. "Gene expression profiling of avian macrophage activation." Veterinary Immunology and Immunopathology 105.3-4:289-99.
- 2006. Cynthia M Boettger, John E Dohms. "Separating Mycoplasma gallisepticum field strains from nonpathogenic avian mycoplasmas." Avian Disease 50.4:605-7.
- 2008. Miha Lavric, Michele N Maughan, Travis W Bliss, John E Dohms, Dusan Bencina, Calvin L Keeler, Mojca Narat. 2008. "Gene expression modulation in chicken macrophages exposed to Mycoplasma synoviae or Escherichia coli." Veterinary Microbiology 126.1-3:111-21.
- Contributor to Y. M. Saif Diseases of Poultry 12th edition.
