= Helene Fortunoff =

American businesswoman (1933–2021)

Helene Fortunoff (March 2, 1933 – November 8, 2021) was an American businessperson who headed Fortunoff.

== Life and career ==
Helene Fortunoff was born as Helene Finke in Paterson, New Jersey on March 2, 1933, to Tillie Finke, a homemaker, and, Samuel Finke, who worked in the HVAC wholesale industry. She was of Jewish ancestry and grew up in nearby Fair Lawn. At the age of 13, she began doing after-school jobs for his father. She graduated from Fair Lawn High School.

Fortunoff started out at Syracuse University, but after two years she switched to NYU's School of Commerce (which has been renamed as New York University Stern School of Business). In 1953, she earned a bachelor's degree in business administration with highest honors.

In 1953, Fortunoff began her career by joining the family retail operation, Fortunoff, run by her husband, Alan Fortunoff's family in Brooklyn. Four years later, in 1957, she recommended expanding the company into the jewelry industry and led the charge. Under her leadership, Fortunoff became one of the largest retailer in the state.

In 2000, Fortunoff became the president of Fortunoff Fine Jewelry & Silverware after the death of her husband.

She retired in 2005, after the Fortunoff family had sold off most of the company to outside investors.

== Awards ==
- National Jeweler Award
- Jewelers of America's Gem Award
