= Fair Lawn Public Schools =

School district in Bergen County, New Jersey, US

Address
- 37-01 Fair Lawn Avenue Fair Lawn, Bergen County, New Jersey, 07410; United States
- Coordinates: 40.94307°N 74.10667°W

District information
- Grades: PreK-12
- Superintendent: Rui Dionisio
- Business administrator: Danielle Mancuso
- Schools: 9

Students and staff
- Enrollment: 5,529 (as of 2022–23)
- Faculty: 458.4 FTEs
- Student–teacher ratio: 12.1:1

Other information
- District Factor Group: GH
- Website: www.fairlawnschools.org
Ind.	Per pupil	District spending	Rank (*)	K-12 average	%± vs. average
1A	Total Spending	$19,430	68	$18,891	2.9%
1	Budgetary Cost	15,866	77	14,783	7.3%
2	Classroom Instruction	9,329	76	8,763	6.5%
6	Support Services	2,541	69	2,392	6.2%
8	Administrative Cost	1,809	97	1,485	21.8%
10	Operations & Maintenance	1,729	59	1,783	−3.0%
13	Extracurricular Activities	330	84	268	23.1%
16	Median Teacher Salary	71,390	81	64,043
Data from NJDoE 2014 Taxpayers' Guide to Education Spending. *Of K-12 districts with more than 3,500 students. Lowest spending=1; Highest=103

The Fair Lawn Public Schools is a comprehensive community public school district serving students in pre-kindergarten through twelfth grade from Fair Lawn in Bergen County, in the U.S. state of New Jersey.

As of the 2022–23 school year, the district, comprised of nine schools, had an enrollment of 5,529 students and 458.4 classroom teachers (on an FTE basis), for a student–teacher ratio of 12.1:1.

The district is classified by the New Jersey Department of Education as being in District Factor Group "GH", the third-highest of eight groupings. District Factor Groups organize districts statewide to allow comparison by common socioeconomic characteristics of the local districts. From lowest socioeconomic status to highest, the categories are A, B, CD, DE, FG, GH, I and J.

== Awards and recognition ==
In both the 1990–91 and 1997-98 school years, Fair Lawn High School received the National Blue Ribbon Award of Excellence from the United States Department of Education, the highest honor that an American school can achieve.

In 2016, Lyncrest Elementary School was one of ten schools in New Jersey recognized as a National Blue Ribbon School by the United States Department of Education, a recognition celebrating excellence in academics.

Henry B. Milnes Elementary School was one of nine schools in New Jersey honored in 2020 by the National Blue Ribbon Schools Program.

== History ==
In December 2014, Fair Lawn voters approved by a greater than 2-to-1 margin a $12.8 million expansion and capital improvement referendum to be implemented by the district. The referendum funded the initiation within two years of a full-day kindergarten in the district, a program offered by most districts countywide, as well as a roof replacement program at six schools. The expenditures were covered by $2.2 million in state aid, with the remaining $10.6 million covered by bonds issued by the school system. The full-day kindergarten program was slated to begin in September 2016.

== Schools ==
Schools in the district (with 2022–23 enrollment data from the National Center for Education Statistics.) are:

Preschool

- Thomas Edison School for preschool

Elementary schools

- John A. Forrest Elementary School with 269 students in grades K-4
  - Damon Placenti, principal
- Lyncrest Elementary School with 207 students in grades K-4
  - Kelly Diee, principal
- Henry B. Milnes Elementary School with 428 students in grades K-4
  - Stephanie Primavera, principal
- Radburn Elementary School with 393 students in grades K-4
  - Jill Lindsay, principal
- Warren Point Elementary School with 392 students in grades K-4
  - Sue Gons, principal
- Westmoreland Elementary School with 393 students in grades PreK-4
  - Christine Dell'Aglio, principal

Middle schools

- Memorial Middle School with 626 students in grades 5-8
  - Nancy Schwindt, principal
- Thomas Jefferson Middle School with 1,134 students in grades 5-8
  - Michael Weaver, principal

High school

- Fair Lawn High School with 1,624 students in grades 9-12
  - Paul Gorski, principal

== Administration ==
Core members of the district's administration are:

- Rui Dionisio, superintendent
- Danielle Mancuso, business administrator and board secretary

== Board of education ==
The district's board of education, comprised of nine members, sets policy and oversees the fiscal and educational operation of the district through its administration. As a Type II school district, the board's trustees are elected directly by voters to serve three-year terms of office on a staggered basis, with three seats up for election each year held (since 2012) as part of the November general election. The board appoints a superintendent to oversee the district's day-to-day operations and a business administrator to supervise the business functions of the district. As of 2026, the Board of Education members are Julie Mahan (president), Edward Bertolini (vice president), Jeanne Browne, Anthony Elia, Rita Fayvelevich, Lyudmila Koroleva, Julie Kossoy, Michael Rosenberg and Wilkin Santana .

In August 2023, the district announced the hiring of Rui Dionisio, superintendent of the Ramapo Indian Hills Regional High School District, who took office as Fair Lawn superintendent in November 2023.
