= St. Anne School (Fair Lawn, New Jersey) =

Coordinates: 40.9222°N 74.1193°W

- 1-30 Summit Avenue; Fair Lawn, NJ 07410

Information
- Type: Catholic school
- Established: 1949
- School district: Roman Catholic Archdiocese of Newark
- Principal: Jason Feliciano
- Faculty: 25.0 (on FTE basis)
- Grades: PreK - 8
- Enrollment: 124 (as of 2019-20)
- Student to teacher ratio: 12.7
- Colors: Blue and White
- Information: 201-796-3353
- Website: School website

St. Anne School, was a private, parochial elementary school serving grades pre-Kindergarten through eighth, located in Fair Lawn, New Jersey. St. Anne's was part of the Roman Catholic Archdiocese of Newark. St. Anne's had been accredited by Middle States Association of Colleges and Schools and was last credited April 2007. The school served the surrounding towns in Bergen County, New Jersey, such as Fair Lawn, Elmwood Park, Saddle Brook, Paterson, and others.

As of the 2005-06 school year, the school had an enrollment of 318 students (plus 45 students in PreK) and 25.0 classroom teachers (on an FTE basis), for a student-teacher ratio of 12.7.

St. Anne's was permanently shut down towards the end of the 2020 school year after the archdiocese decided to close multiple schools due to financial losses from the pandemic.
