= The Silent Worker =

19th and 20th century newspaper

- School: New Jersey School for the Deaf
- Founded: 1888; 137 years ago
- Country: United States

The Silent Worker was a newspaper published in the United States serving the deaf community. Originally published in 1888 as the Deaf Mute Times, the paper was renamed that year to The Silent Worker. The paper was published monthly from fall through spring by the New Jersey School for the Deaf The silent Worker published articles, primarily written by deaf authors, highlighting the abilities and achievements of the deaf community, particularly in industry.

During the early 20th century, when most school administrations were transitioning away from the use of American Sign Language in favor of the oral method of instruction, the silent worker generally advocated a dissenting view. The publication ceased in June 1929 following the dismissal of its editor, George Porter.

A new edition of the Silent Worker was published by the National Association for the Deaf from 1948 to 1966.

== See also ==
- Silent News
- Elizabeth English Benson, featured 1906
