= Three Twins =

American ice cream company

Three Twins Ice Cream
- Company type: Private
- Industry: Ice cream shop and manufacturer
- Founded: 2005; 21 years ago in Terra Linda, San Rafael, California
- Founder: Neal Gottlieb
- Defunct: April 17, 2020; 6 years ago
- Fate: Closure as result of Covid-19 pandemic
- Headquarters: Petaluma, California, US
- Number of locations: 7 (at peak in 2017)
- Area served: California
- Products: Organic gourmet ice cream
- Owner: Neal Gottlieb
- Website: Archive of company's official website

Three Twins Ice Cream was an American organic ice cream company based in California, established in 2005. Three Twins owned and operated three brick and mortar ice cream shops in Northern California and was a nationwide wholesaler of ice cream products. It closed in April 2020.

== History ==
Three Twins was established in 2005 in Terra Linda, San Rafael, California. It was started by Cornell University graduate Neal Gottlieb and was named for Gottlieb, his twin brother, and his brother's wife, who is also a twin. It was the first organic ice cream shop chain in the U.S. The company began distributing its products nationally after Whole Foods found them selling their ice cream at the Berkeley Farmers Market.

Three Twins opened a factory in Petaluma, California in 2010. In mid-2019 it moved all manufacturing operations to the former plant of Zurheide Ice Cream in Sheboygan, Wisconsin (which it had purchased in 2014); its corporate headquarters remained in Petaluma.

On April 17, 2020, the company announced it was closing due to financial problems compounded by the coronavirus pandemic.

== Locations ==
By November 2017, the company owned and operated four shops, in San Francisco, Larkspur, and Napa in addition to San Rafael, and licensed stores in Berkeley, Santa Monica, and at the San Francisco airport, and was exporting to South Korea. A licensed location at Fisherman's Wharf had closed. The San Francisco shop, in the Lower Haight, closed in January 2018. By April 2020, the Santa Monica location had also closed and the company had licensed/franchise locations in Tokyo and Seoul.

== Products ==
Three Twins' flavors rotated between core offerings such as Mint Confetti (mint ice cream with flecks of dark chocolate) and Strawberry Je Ne Sais Quoi (strawberry with a hint of balsamic vinegar), and specialty flavors such as Cookie Jar (vanilla with three types of cookies). Its original shop garnered attention with some offbeat offerings, such as Mutton Vindaloo and the "most expensive sundae in the world" (no takers yet) and a "Sergio Romo Mexican Chocolate" flavor with the motto "It only tastes illegal." The expensive dessert was an Absurdity Sundae that cost $3,333.33 and included banana split drenched in syrups from rare dessert wines (German Trockenbeerenauslese, 1960s vintage port, and a Chateau D’Yquem).
