= Zabriskie =

Zabriskie is a surname, anglicized from Polish Zaborowski or Zabrzyski. Notable people with the surname include:

== People ==
- Albert Zabriskie, originally Albrycht Zaborowski (1638–1711), American colonial settler
- Andrew C. Zabriskie (1853–1916), American businessman
- Chris Zabriskie (born 1982), American composer
- Christian Brevoort Zabriskie (1864–1936), American businessman
- David Zabriskie (born 1986), American wrestler
- David Zabriskie (born 1979), American cyclist
- Frank Zabriskie (1933–2021), Scottish astronomer
- George Zabriskie Gray (1837–1889), American priest
- Grace Zabriskie (born 1941), American actress
- Louise Zabriskie (1872–1957), American nurse
- Oothout Zabriskie Whitehead (1911–1998), American actor
- Steve Zabriskie (born 1947), American sports announcer
- Stewart Clark Zabriskie (1937–1999), American bishop
- Virginia M. Zabriskie (1927–2019), American art dealer

== Places ==
- Ackerman-Zabriskie-Steuben House, River Edge, New Jersey
- Albert J. Zabriskie Farmhouse, Paramus, New Jersey
- Edgar Zabriskie Residence, Omaha, Nebraska
- Garret Zabriskie House, Haworth, New Jersey
- Nicholas Zabriskie House, Washington Township, New Jersey
- Rathbone-Zabriskie House, Ridgewood, New Jersey
- Zabriskie-Christie House, Dumont, New Jersey
- Zabriskie Gallery, New York, New York
- Zabriskie House (Bard College), Cambridge, Massachusetts
- Zabriskie House (Ho-Ho-Kus, New Jersey)
- Zabriskie-Kipp-Cadmus House, Teaneck, New Jersey
- Zabriskie Point (disambiguation)
- Zabriskie Quartzite, California
- Zabriskie Tenant House, Paramus, New Jersey
- Zabriskie House (disambiguation)

== See also ==
- Zborowski
- Elliott Zborowski (1858–1903), American racing driver
- Louis Zborowski (1895–1924), English racing driver
