= Zabriskie House =

Zabriskie House may refer to:

== Nebraska ==
- Edgar Zabriskie Residence, Omaha, Nebraska

== New Jersey ==
- Zabriskie-Steuben House, River Edge, New Jersey
- Albert J. Zabriskie Farmhouse, Paramus, New Jersey
- Garret Zabriskie House, Haworth, New Jersey
- Nicholas Zabriskie House, Washington Township, New Jersey
- Rathbone–Zabriskie House, Ridgewood, New Jersey
- John A. L. Zabriskie House, Ridgewood, New Jersey
- Van Voorhees–Quackenbush House, Wyckoff, New Jersey
- Zabriskie House (Ho-Ho-Kus, New Jersey), Ho-Ho-Kus, New Jersey
- Zabriskie-Christie House, Dumont, New Jersey
- Zabriskie-Kipp-Cadmus House, Teaneck, New Jersey
- Zabriskie Tenant House, Paramus, New Jersey

== See also ==
- Zabriskie, a surname
