= Naugle House =

Historic house in New Jersey, United States

- U.S. National Register of Historic Places
- New Jersey Register of Historic Places
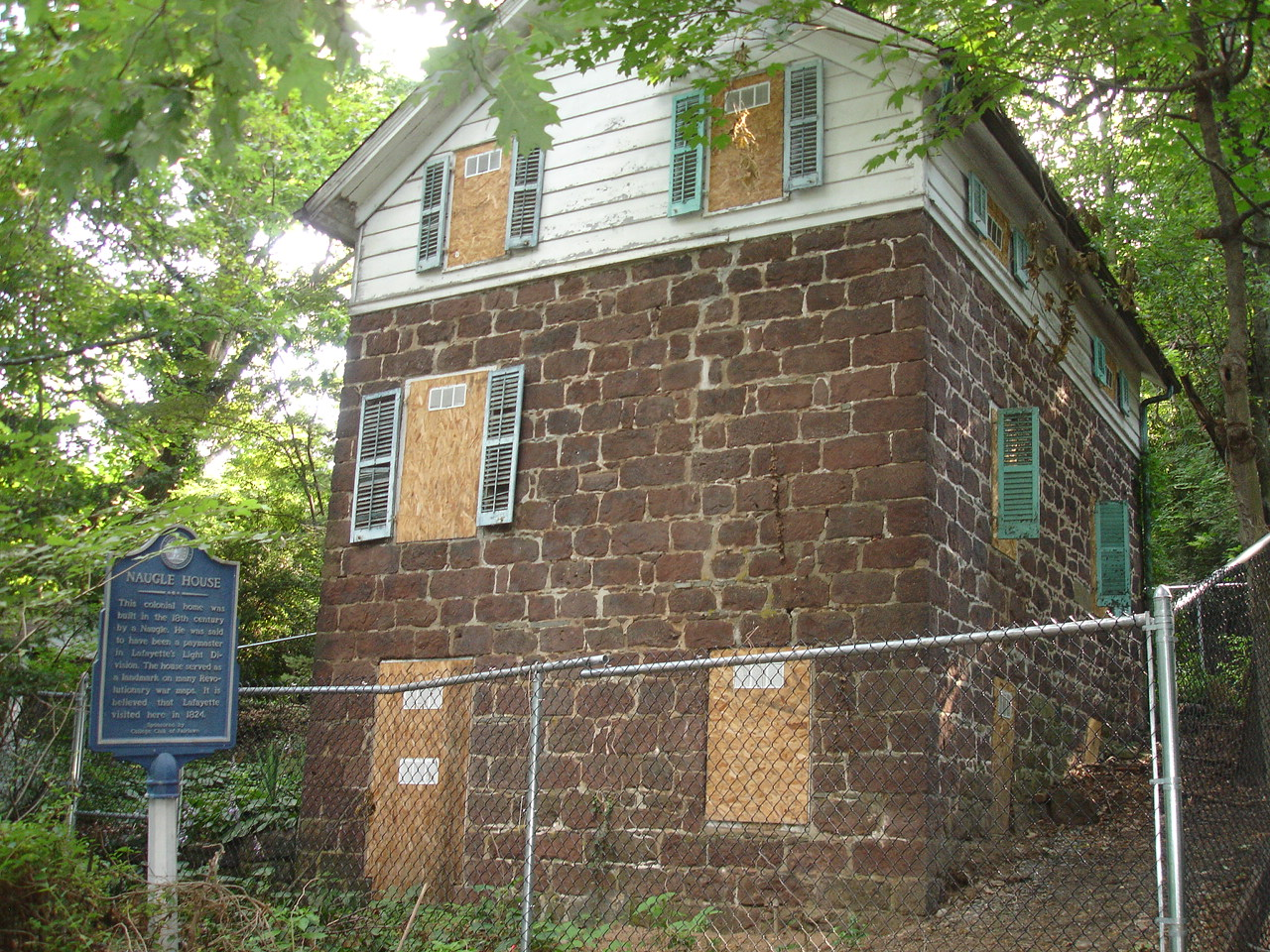
- Naugle House in 2011.

- Location within Bergen County, New Jersey Location within New Jersey Location within the United States
- Location: 42-49 Dunkerhook Road, Fair Lawn, New Jersey
- Coordinates: 40°56′44″N 74°5′58″W
- Area: 1.1 acres (0.45 ha)
- MPS: Stone Houses of Bergen County TR
- NRHP reference No.: 83001536
- NJRHP No.: 481

Significant dates
- Added to NRHP: January 9, 1983
- Designated NJRHP: October 3, 1980

The Naugle House is a historic house of the Dutch Colonial style on Dunkerhook Road in Fair Lawn, New Jersey, adjacent to the Saddle River County Park. It was constructed around 1745 on a small hillside along the Saddle River (Passaic River) and is approached from Dunkerhook Road via a roadway that permits access to the park. The National Park Service Heritage Documentation Programs Historic American Buildings Survey took photographs and made architectural drawings of the house in 1938, and the National Park Service added the Naugle House to the National Register of Historic Places on January 9, 1983.

Since its construction, the Naugle House has been a neighbor to the Jacob Vanderbeck Jr. House; Jacob Vanderbeck Sr. constructed both houses. It is typical of the Dutch Colonial architecture of the region in featuring coursed ashlar sandstone block walls, but is unique in having been built into the side of a hill, giving it two and a half stories. The lowest level was a kitchen, and its top floor is wooden frame construction. Its plan and appearance are remarkably similar to the now-demolished Zabriskie Tenant House, which sat a short distance away from the Naugle House on Dunkerhook Road across the Saddle River in Paramus. Its small size, unique appearance, and configuration near one of the entrances to the Saddle River County Park have made it a recognizable and beloved landmark building in Fair Lawn. The Naugle House may have a further historical link, having possibly been visited by the Marquis de Lafayette, a Continental Army leader and close associate of George Washington and Alexander Hamilton, in 1784.

In 2010, Fair Lawn purchased the Naugle House for $1,700,000, a combination of borough funds and monies from the Bergen County and State of New Jersey Open Space and Green Acres funding programs, in order to protect the house and to create a greenspace of trees and lawns around the house in perpetuity. That purchase followed plans for the construction of town houses on the Naugle House's property. Although Fair Lawn and Bergen County held a dedication ceremony for the house in the fall of 2011, the year that the historic preservation organization Preservation New Jersey placed the house on its "Ten Most Endangered" List, the Naugle House has come under pressure of demolition or neglect by nature of development plans for the Jacob Vanderbeck Jr. House that involve the construction of parking lots and driveways completely around the Naugle House, thereby endangering its structural and historic landscape integrity. A group of preservationists and concerned citizens continue to fight for its preservation for future generations.
