= Andrew C. Zabriskie =

American heir and real estate investor (1853–1916)

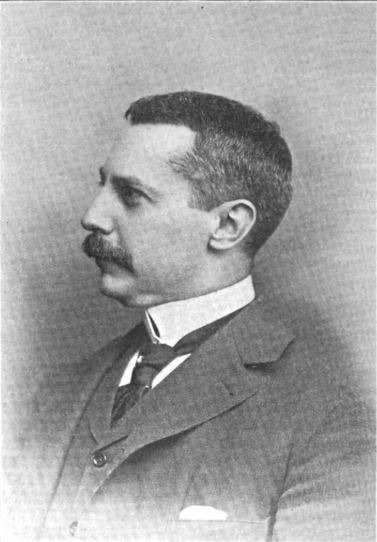
- Born: Andrew Christian Zabriskie; May 30, 1853; New York City, New York, U.S.
- Died: September 15, 1916 (aged 63); Annandale-on-Hudson, New York, U.S.
- Education: Columbia University
- Spouse: Frances Hunter (m. 1895)
- Children: 2
- Relatives: Alister Greene (cousin); Eliot Zborowski (cousin)

Andrew Christian Zabriskie (May 30, 1853 – September 15, 1916) was an American heir and real estate investor.

== Early life ==
Zabriskie was born in New York City on May 30, 1853. He was the son of Sarah Jane (née Titus) Zabriskie (1822–1892) and Christian Andrew Zabriskie (1806–1879), who was prominent in Episcopal church circles in Bergen County, New Jersey. His father never engaged in business, instead preferring the "quiet enjoyments of county life."

His paternal grandparents were Mary (née Ryerson) Zabriskie, a direct descendant of Joris Jansen Rapelje, and Andrew Christian Zabriskie, who was born in Paramus at the ancestral homestead. Besides his father, his paternal uncles were Martin, John, and John Jacob Zabriskie, (Note: His uncle, John Jacob Zabriskie, owned a cotton mill in Ho-Ho-Kus, New Jersey and built what is today known as the Zabriskie House there.) all descended from Albrycht Zaborowski, who left Ducal Prussia after the Thirty Years' War, and came to New Amsterdam on the Dutch ship De Vos ship in 1662. Through his paternal aunt, Matilda Mary (née Zabriskie) Greene, he was a first cousin of Alister Greene, who served as Zabriskie's best man at his 1895 wedding. Through his uncle Martin, (Note: His uncle, Martin Zabriskie, changed his surname to the original Zborowski. His daughter, Anna, who married Charles de Montalbon, Baron de Fontenoy (or the Comte de Montsaulnin).) he was also a first cousin of Eliot Zborowski, who married Margaret Astor Carey, a granddaughter of William Backhouse Astor, Sr. His maternal grandparents were Captain William M. Titus, who served in the War of 1812, and Maria (née Gardner) Titus.

Zabriskie was educated in private schools and, later, graduated from the School of Mines at Columbia University.

== Career ==
Zabriskie was one of the largest real estate owners in New York City and devoted much of his time to managing the estate. His office was located at 52 Beaver Street in a building built by his grandfather, William M. Titus, on land once owned by his great-grandfather, Thomas Gardner, "a wealthy resident of Paramus, and who was somewhat eccentric in disposition." He also served as president of the Bergen Turnpike, which was originally incorporated in 1802 with Colonel John Stevens as its first president.

After joining the American Numismatic and Archaeological Society in 1874, he became a life member in 1894, served as third vice-president from 1880 to 1883 and then as first vice-president from 1884 to 1896, and lastly, the president for ten years beginning in 1896. He resigned in protest in December 1904 (and was succeeded by Archer M. Huntington) following a financial crisis where he advocated for the merger of the Society with the New-York Historical Society, but was rejected by the membership.

=== Military service ===
In 1873, he joined Company B of the 7th Regiment, N.Y.N.G. and served as Inspector of Rifle Practice for the 71st Regiment, where he served as Captain of Company C until his resignation in 1897. He was known as Captain Zabriskie for the rest of his life. Zabriskie donated a bronze trophy, known as the Zabriskie Trophy, "which is annually shot for by the various companies of the 71st Regiment."

=== Political career ===
In Duchess County, he was a member of the Democratic State Executive Committee and chairman of the Duchess County Board of Supervisors. In 1879, he served as treasurer of the Independent Republicans in the "revolt against Governor Cornell's reelection."

In 1908, he was nominated as the Democratic candidate to represent the 21st District of New York in the U.S. Congress. He ran against the sitting Assistant Treasurer of the United States, Hamilton Fish II, who was a son of former U.S. Senator and Secretary of State Hamilton Fish. Also from his district was neighbor and the incumbent Democratic Lt. Gov., Lewis Stuyvesant Chanler, who was running for Governor against the incumbent Republican, Charles Evans Hughes (later the Secretary of State and Chief Justice of the United States). Both Zabriskie and Chanler lost in their bids. Fish received 22,832 votes to Zabriskie's 19,725 votes.

== Personal life ==
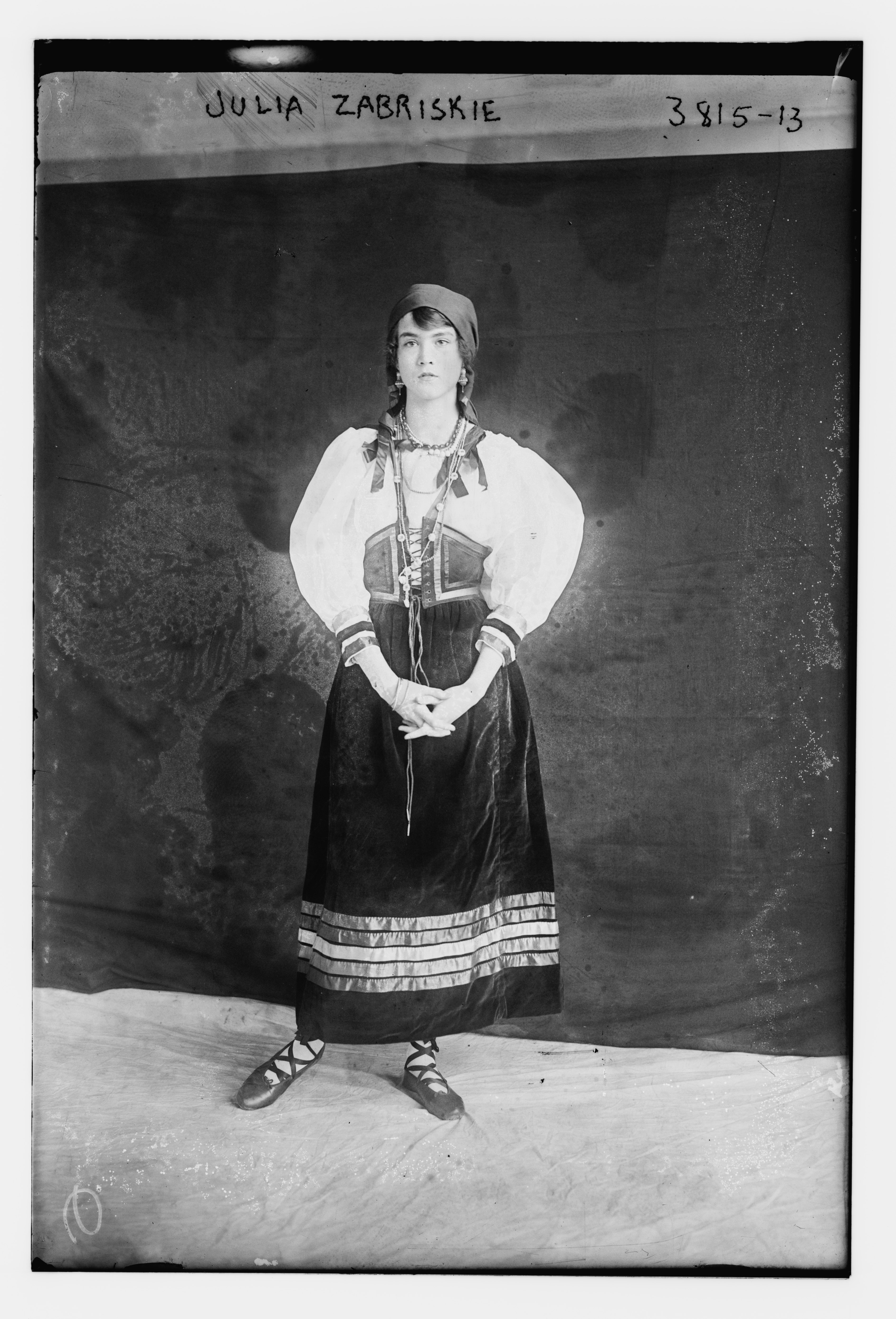
Zabriskie's daughter, Julia Zabriskie, in costume in 1915

In June 1895, Zabriskie was married to Frances Hunter (1866–1951) at the Madison Square Presbyterian Church. Frances was the daughter of Juliana M. W. (née Zabriskie) Hunter and Charles Frederick Hunter, former president of the People's Bank of New York. Frances' maternal grandparents were George Zabriskie and Susan Van Campen (née Romeyn) Zabriskie. (Note: Through her maternal aunt, Susan Maria (née Zabriskie) Gray (1814–1904), Frances was a first cousin of John Clinton Gray and George Zabriskie Gray.) Together, were the parents of two children:

- Julia Romeyn Zabriskie (1897–1931), a débutante who married Edward Powis Jones (1880–1927), a Harvard Law School educated lawyer, in 1918.
- Christian Andrew Zabriskie (1899–1970), a noted bibliophile and collector of art. In 1937, he donated a Mortlake tapestry known as "The Seizure of Cassandra by Ajax from a set of The Horses", c. 1650-70 to the Metropolitan Museum of Art.

He was a noted collector of medals, giving speeches and writing a book on the topic. He was "particularly proud of his collection of medallions of Abraham Lincoln." Zabriskie was a member of the St. Nicholas Society, the Holland Society, the Society of Colonial Wars, the Military Society of the War of 1812, the Union Club of the City of New York, the Army and Navy Club, the Riding Club the Aero Club of America, and the Metropolitan Club.

On September 15, 1916, Zabriskie died at Blithewood, his country home in Annandale-on-Hudson, New York. He was buried at Woodlawn Cemetery in the Bronx. His estate, consisting mainly of an estimated $5,000,000 to $10,000,000 of real estate, was left entirely to his widow. After the death of his widow in 1951, Zabriskie's son donated 825 acres of the Blithewood estate, including its manor house, seven other houses, three barns, and two garages on the property, to Bard College, in exchange for $1. Today Blithewood is home to the Levy Economics Institute.

=== Residences ===
In New York City, the Zabriskies variously lived at 12 East 30th Street, 2 West 56th Street and 34 West 53rd Street. In addition, the Zabriskie's owned two country estates, Province Island on Lake Memphramagog and Blithewood at Annandale-on-Hudson, New York.

Province Island, at 77 plus acres, is the largest island on Lake Memphremagog and is located mostly in Magog, Quebec, Canada with 7 acres at the southern tip located in Newport, Vermont. Around 1886, Zabriskie built a large mansion, a boathouse, and wharf on the Canadian side and the island was known as Zabriskie's Island. Zabriskie kept his steam yacht Dodo docked at the island. In 1917, after his death, the island was bought by Benjamin Howard, father of Canadian Senator Charles Benjamin Howard and was renamed Howard's Island. Around 1968, the residence built by Zabriskie was demolished due to the cost of its maintenance.

In 1899, Zabriskie purchased Blithewood from John Bard's 1,000-acre estate and commissioned Francis L. V. Hoppin, a McKim, Mead and White alumnus, to tear down the old home and build a new 42-room Georgian-style manor house in the Beaux-Arts style. Bard had purchased Blithewood in 1853 from Robert Donaldson Jr., who had hired landscape designer Andrew Jackson Downing to transform the grounds upon his 1835 purchase of the 92-acre estate, then known as Annandale (owned by John Church Cruger, the father of Stephen Van Rensselaer Cruger and son-in-law of Stephen Van Rensselaer).
