= Jacob Vanderbeck Jr. House =

Historic house in New Jersey, United States

- U.S. National Register of Historic Places
- New Jersey Register of Historic Places
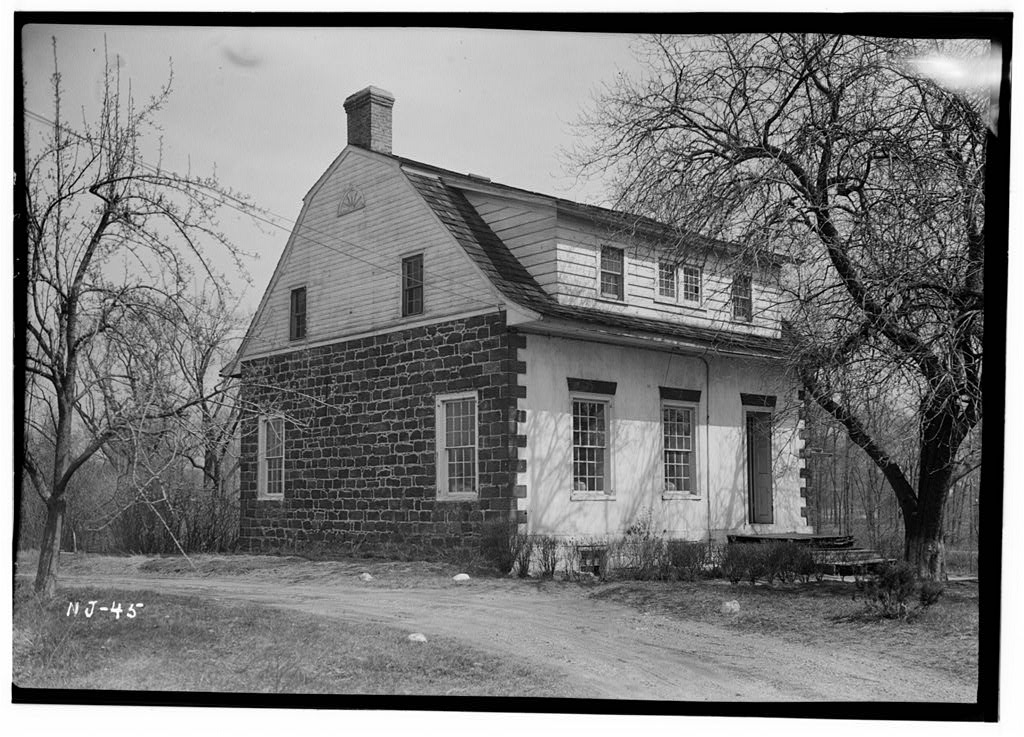
- Vanderbeck House in 1945

- Location within Bergen County, New Jersey Location within New Jersey Location within the United States
- Location: Barrister Ct., Fair Lawn, New Jersey
- Coordinates: 40°56′46″N 74°6′2″W
- Area: 2.9 acres (1.2 ha)
- Architects: Vanderbeck, Jacob
- MPS: Stone Houses of Bergen County TR
- NRHP reference No.: 83001566
- NJRHP No.: 484

Significant dates
- Added to NRHP: January 9, 1983
- Designated NJRHP: October 3, 1980

The Jacob Vanderbeck Jr. House, in Fair Lawn, Bergen County, New Jersey, United States, is a typical historic house of the American colonial architecture style called Dutch Colonial on Dunkerhook Road, adjacent to the Saddle River County Park. It sits on a bluff above the Saddle River (Passaic River) and is approached from Dunkerhook Road via Barrister Court, a condominium development it is now part of. The house was added to the National Register of Historic Places on January 9, 1983.

Jacob Vanderbeck Sr., who also built the neighboring Naugle House, built the original section of the house in 1754; it was a small, wooden-framed home on to which a larger wing, to the west, featuring coursed ashlar sandstone walls and one and a half stories under a gambrel roof, was added in the 1780s. Shortly after the National Park Service Heritage Documentation Programs Historic American Buildings Survey took photographs and made architectural drawings of the house in 1938, the house's owners, the Walter Squires, replaced the original east wing of the house with an architecturally compatible addition with sandstone blocks and a gambrel roof that updated the house and significantly increased the home's size. The interior of the house retains many of its original features.

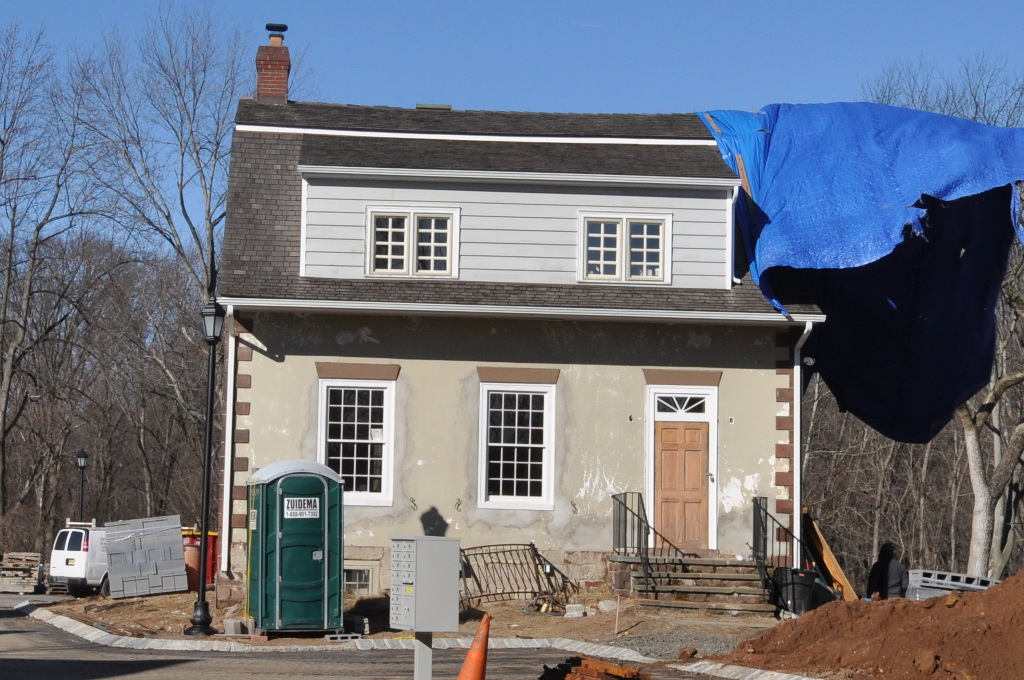
The house, undergoing renovation and enlargement in 2019

After the death of its most recent owner, Henrietta Vander Platt, developers showed interest in demolishing the house, removing all of the trees, and placing on the lot an assisted living facility. A group of devoted preservationists and citizens engaged in an effort to save the Vanderbeck House, bolstered by its listing as one of 2013's "Ten Most Endangered" historic properties by the Trenton-based historic preservation organization Preservation New Jersey.

== See also ==
- National Register of Historic Places listings in Bergen County, New Jersey
