= Bard Free Press =

Bard College student newspaper

The Bard Free Press
- Type: Monthly newspaper
- Format: Tabloid
- Owner: Independent
- Founded: 2000
- Language: English
- Headquarters: Annandale-on-Hudson, New York
- Circulation: 2,000
- Price: Free
- Website: issuu.com/bardfreepress/

The Bard Free Press (the Free Press) was a monthly college newspaper published by students of Bard College, a private liberal arts college in Annandale-on-Hudson, New York.

The paper was founded in 2000, by former student editors of The Observer, Bard's original college newspaper. The Free Press and the Bard Observer merged in 2008. The Free Press ceased publishing in 2020, in the wake of the COVID-19 pandemic. The Bard Observer, which had gone dormant in the wake of the 2008 merger with the Free Press, was reestablished in 2023.

The paper has a circulation of about 2,000 and was the only printed student newspaper at Bard.

The Free Press was run entirely by Bard College undergraduates, and had no faculty advisor. All decisions on its content and operations are made by editors.

== History ==
The first issue of the Bard Free Press was printed on March 14, 2000. At the time, another student newspaper already existed, The Observer, which had been a campus publication since 1961. According to the Free Press Mission of Purpose, the paper "was founded by former members of the Bard Observer staff––the managing editor, section editors and contributors––who were dissatisfied with the quality of student journalism at Bard." Initially, the Free Press focused on world news, U.S. politics, and student editorials. In 2003, SPIN Magazine recognized the Free Press as the “Best Campus Publication” in their First Annual SPIN Campus Awards.

The Free Press merged with the Observer in 2008, in conjunction with a major redesign that departed from a traditional tabloid format.

== Awards ==
In 2013, the Bard Free Press won a Best in Show title from the Associated Collegiate Press. In 2014, the Free Press received first place for design and second place for feature story by the New York Press Association awards.

== Format ==
The Free Press began as a newspaper, then shifted towards a tabloid format. In March 2016, the Free Press became a glossy magazine. Beginning in February 2017, the publication abandoned recurring columns and sections in favor of a more fluid structure that varied issue by issue. The paper was published once a month, and distributed throughout Bard's campus, and nearby in Tivoli and Red Hook, New York.

== Funding ==
The newspaper did not accept outside advertisements or announcements from student clubs or programs. The newspaper was financed through Bard's Convocation Fund, a collective percentage of each student's tuition. Like all charter clubs at the college, the paper's budget was determined annually by the elected student body, and could not be reduced during the biennual budget forum.
