= Alister Greene =

American soldier

- Born: September 28, 1854; New York City, New York, U.S.
- Died: March 8, 1923 (aged 68); New York City, New York, U.S.
- Education: Columbia College; Columbia Law School
- Parent(s): Martin E. Greene; Matilda Zabriskie Greene
- Relatives: Eliot Zborowski (cousin); Andrew C. Zabriskie (cousin)

Alister Greene (September 28, 1854 – March 8, 1923) was an American soldier and social leader during the Gilded Age.

== Early life ==
Greene was born in New York City on September 28, 1854. He was the son of Martin E. Greene (1826–1907) and Matilda Mary (née Zabriskie) Greene (d. 1898), who had been well known in the older New York society.

His maternal grandparents were Mary (née Ryerson) Zabriskie and Andrew Christian Zabriskie, and the Zabriskie family descended from Albrycht Zaborowski, a Polish immigrant from Angerburg (Węgorzewo) in Ducal Prussia, who settled in New Jersey in 1662 alongside a Dutch community. His cousin, Andrew Christian Zabriskie was married to Frances Hunter in 1895, and Alister served as best man. Another cousin, Eliot Zborowski, was married to Margaret Astor Carey, a niece of William Astor Jr., Caroline Astor, and granddaughter of William Backhouse Astor, Sr. of the prominent Astor family.

He was a graduate of Columbia College and Columbia Law School.

== Career ==
After Greene graduated from law school, he "devoted his life to study and research in law" but never actually practiced law.

He was also a volunteer with the 10th company of New York's 7th Regiment, which was referred to as the "silk stocking" regiment or "Blue-Bloods", due to the disproportionate number of its members who were part of New York City's social elite,

=== Society life ===
In 1892, Greene, who was well known in the "New York club and society worlds," was included in Ward McAllister's "Four Hundred", purported to be an index of New York's best families, published in The New York Times. Conveniently, 400 was the number of people that could fit into Mrs. Astor's ballroom.

He was a member of the New York Genealogical and Biographical Society, serving on its executive committee, a life member of the New-York Historical Society (since 1896), and was a member of the Union Club of the City of New York, the Metropolitan Club, the University Club, the Army and Navy Club, the New York Yacht Club, and the American Bar Association.

== Personal life ==
Greene, who did not marry, lived at 65 East 72nd Street in New York City, one of two four story (and basement) dwellings, covering a plot 40 ft. by 102 ft along with 63 East 72nd Street which was owned by his father.

Greene died of pneumonia at his New York residence on March 8, 1923. His funeral was held at the Church of the Incarnation on Madison Avenue. A month after his death, the heirs of his and his later father's estates sold the East 72nd Street properties. In November 1923, his estate sold additional property owned by Greene at 102 Franklin Street (in the modern neighborhood of Tribeca) which consisted of a five-story and basement building on a lot of 25 by 100 feet.
