= Ho-Ho-Kus Brook =

Tributary of the Saddle River, New Jersey

Coordinates: 40°58′11″N 74°06′32″W

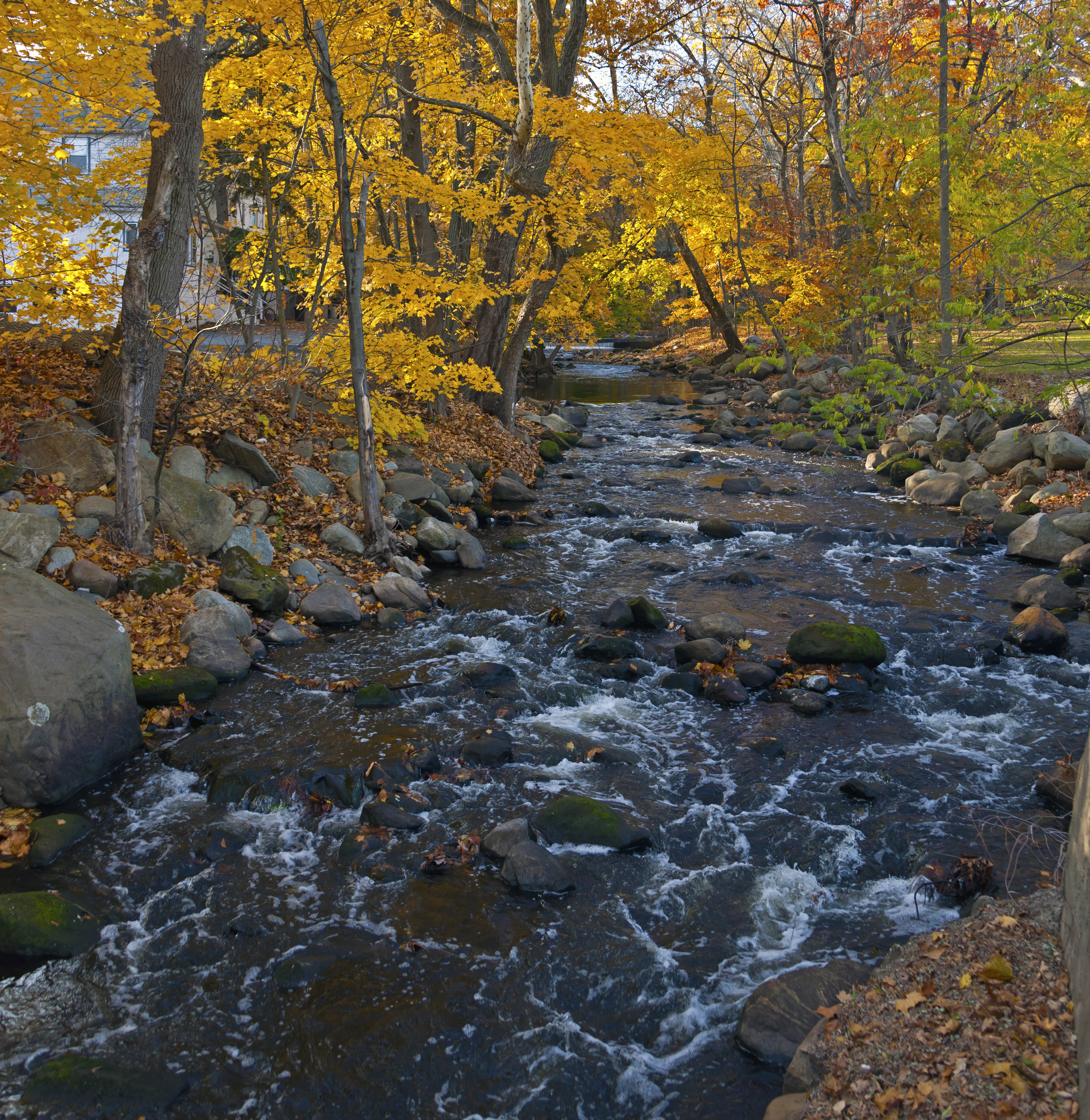
Ho-Ho-Kus Brook flowing through downtown Ho-Ho-Kus

Ho-Ho-Kus Brook is a tributary of the Saddle River (which is itself a tributary of the Passaic River) in Bergen County, New Jersey, in the United States.

The brook originates in Mahwah.

Ho-Ho-Kus Brook joins the Saddle River at the Dunkerhook area of Saddle River County Park. Their confluence marks the border of four Bergen County communities: Ridgewood, Paramus, Glen Rock, and Fair Lawn.

While it flows it marks the border between Mahwah and Wyckoff.

== Communities ==
These are the communities that the Ho-Ho-Kus Brook passes along:

- Mahwah
- Franklin Lakes
- Wyckoff
- Allendale
- Waldwick
- Ho-Ho-Kus
- Ridgewood
- Glen Rock

== See also ==
- List of rivers of New Jersey
