= Zaborowski =

Zaborowski (feminine: Zaborowska; plural: Zaborowscy) is a Polish surname. Notable people include:

- Albrycht Zaborowski (1638–1711), Polish nobleman of Ducal Prussia
- Cathrine Zaborowski (born 1971), former Norwegian football player
- Filip Zaborowski (born 1994), Polish swimmer
- Ignacy Zaborowski (1754–1803), Polish mathematician and geodesist
- Tymon Zaborowski (1799–1828), Polish poet
- Zbyszek Zaborowski (born 1958), Polish politician

== See also ==
- Glinik Zaborowski, village in the administrative district of Gmina Strzyżów, within Strzyżów County, Subcarpathian Voivodeship, in south-eastern Poland
- Zabriskie, a surname
