= Clinton Hill (artist) =

American abstract artist (1922–2003)

Clinton Hill (1922–2003) was an American abstract artist who created abstract color compositions on canvas, constructions made from wood and canvas, wood and plastic relief sculptures, collage, woodblock prints and unique assemblages of handmade paper.

== Life and work ==
Born in Payette, Idaho, and raised on a working ranch, Clinton Hill served in the navy during World War II as commander of a minesweeper in the Pacific. Upon his return from service, Hill attended the University of Oregon from which he graduated in 1947. He then moved to New York City, where Hill attended the Brooklyn Museum Art School from 1949 to 1951."The work of Clinton Hill is characterized by a lyrical abstraction which is derived from the painterly tradition of the New York School" In 1951 he left for Paris where he furthered his art studies on the GI Bill at the Academie de la Grande Chaumiere and then on to Florence, Italy where Hill studied painting at the Instituto d'Art Statale."Clinton's Hill's first important works were made in the period after 1950s." Upon returning to NY, Hill prepared for his first solo exhibition at the Zabriskie Gallery. His friend Mark Rothko suggested the name of the show "Ladders and Windows;" and from that exhibit in 1955 forward, Hill had numerous one man shows in both the US and Europe. Clinton Hill has been a part of almost 100 exhibitions over a 55-year period."Hill would expand his interest in physically assertive surfaces and outline into outright sculptural relief" In 1958 Hill traveled to India on a Fulbright scholarship."Since the late eighties he produced pieces with a linear element running through the handmade paper, and sculptural forms utilizing wood, charcoal and oil, sometimes attached to canvas and sometimes freestanding pieces, using similar color balances" For over 20 years he was Professor of Painting at Queens College of the City University of New York.
