= Easton Tower =

- Location: Intersection of Red Mill & Paramus roads, Paramus, New Jersey
- Coordinates: 40°55′30″N 74°05′25″W
- Built: 1899

New Jersey Register of Historic Places
- Designated: February 7, 2007

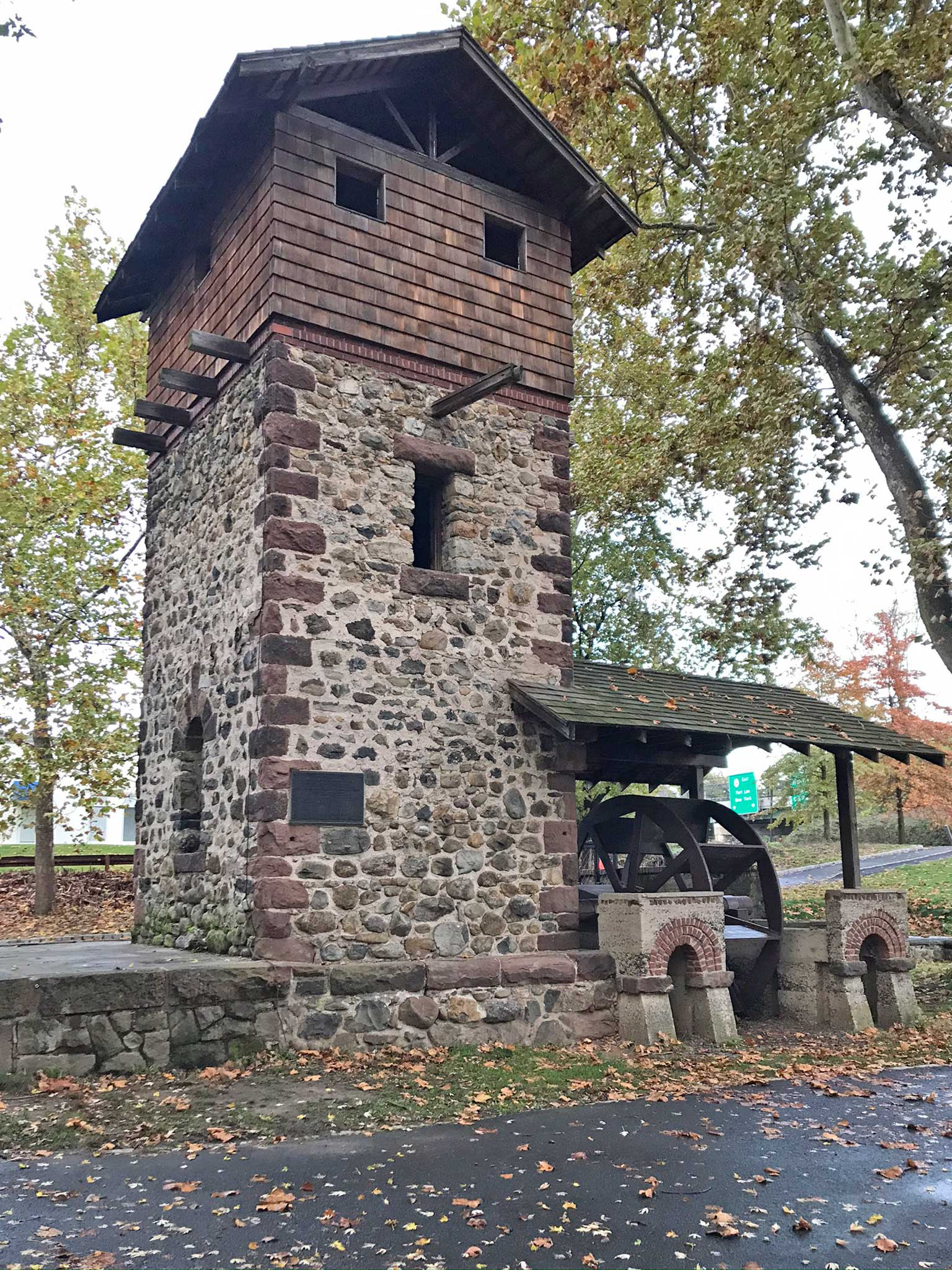
Easton Tower, 2020

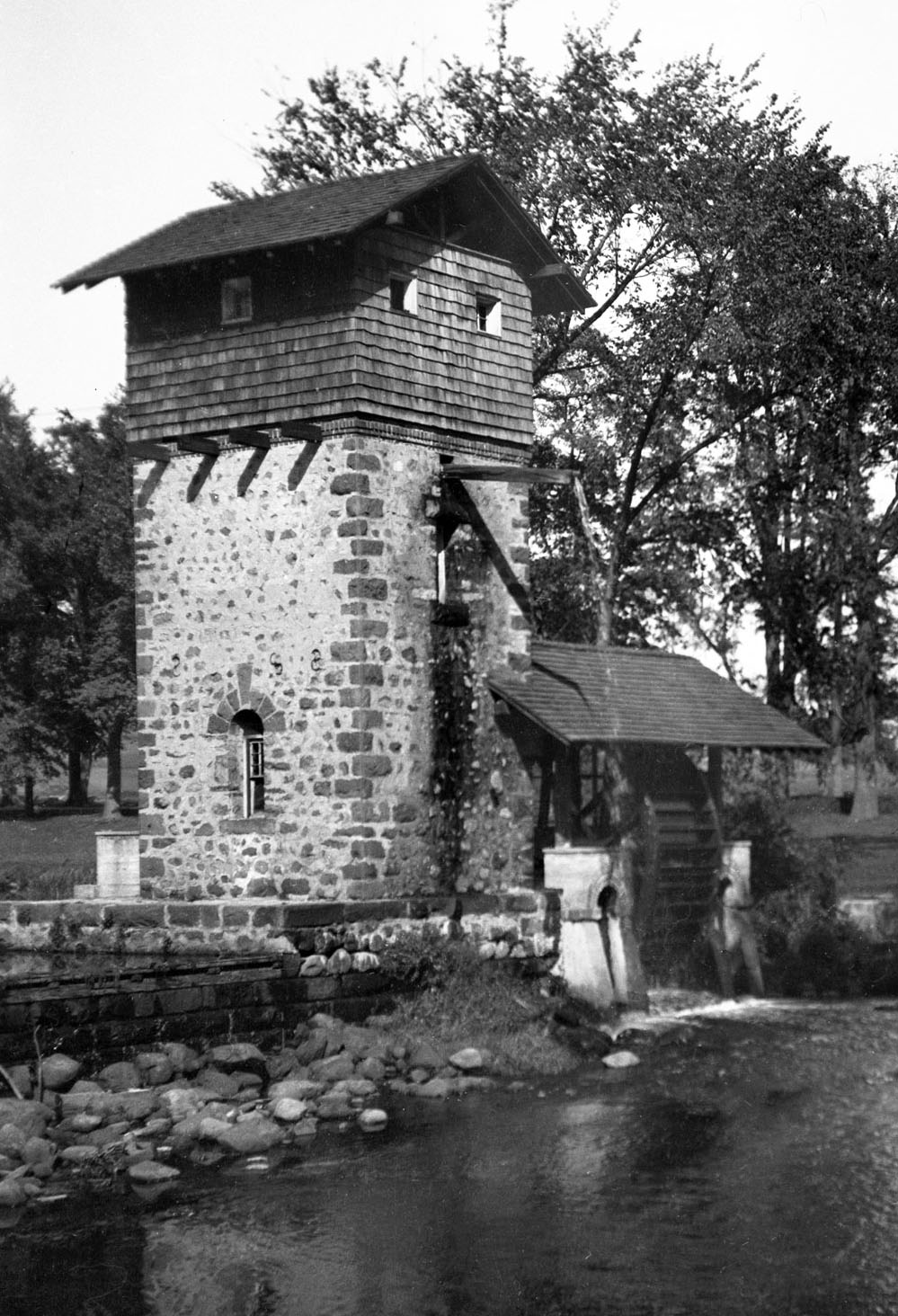
Photograph of Easton Tower taken by Charles Warren Eaton, early 1900s. Priscilla Douglas Polkinghorn Collection, Historical Society of Bloomfield (New Jersey)

Easton Tower is a historic building located in the Arcola area of Paramus, New Jersey, and originally used as the housing for a water pump on the estate of businessman Edward D. Easton. It was built in 1899 and is located next to the Saddle River at the intersection of Red Mill & Paramus roads.
