= Marja Vallila =

American artist (1950–2018)

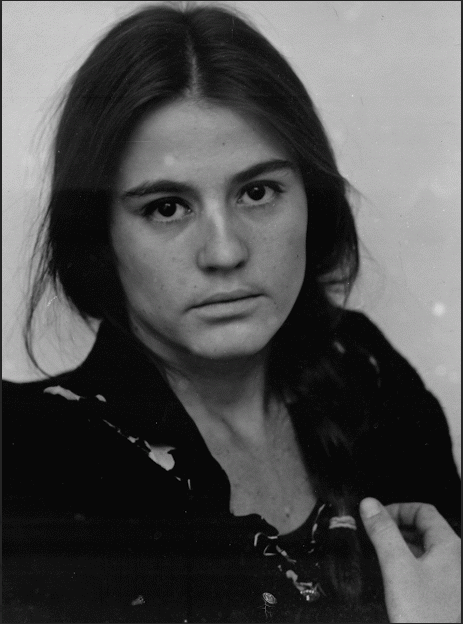
- Artist Marja Vallila
- Born: October 20, 1950; Prague, Czechoslovakia.
- Died: December 23, 2018 (aged 68)
- Occupation: Sculptor

Marja Vallila (October 20, 1950 – December 23, 2018) was an American artist, painter, ceramicist and sculptor.

== Biography ==
Marja Vallila was born in Prague, Czechoslovakia to a Finnish father, diplomat Olli Vallila, and a mother of Czech descent, Rúzena (Rose) Stepánka. She later moved to Geneva (Switzerland), then Finland, and finally settled in Washington DC where she learned a fourth language and attended Western High school, renamed (1974) Duke Ellington School of the Arts in the Georgetown neighborhood. She pursued her education at Cornell University (master of fine arts), (Fulbright grantee) and participated in exhibitions at the Herbert F. Johnson Museum of Art.

She found a place in a warehouse in SoHo, Manhattan that was spacious enough to accommodate both a studio and living space. She then met sculptor James W. Buchman, whom she married, and started teaching as a professor in the art department at SUNY, University at Albany.

In 1992, she spent a year of residency in France, Centre culturel de la Villedieu.

Her early researches often led to large outdoors architectonic sculptures made of steel, sometimes with the addition of granite, cement or wood. She then went through a period of small-scale metal sculptures, already incorporating objects of daily life in her carving and casting processes, paradoxically resulting in a precious like object. It is only after a visit to Deruta, Italy that she started exploring again, in a unique way, combining trivial objects, the many possibilities of slip-cast ceramics, a medium often used in decorative arts but seldom attached to High Art. Art critics spoke about these overlapping, textured, dynamic, three dimensional collages that offer "final forms [...] almost amphibian-looking biomorphic creations that "verge on the vessel yet avoid a central, open void," according to John Perreault. Polychromatic with layered transparencies, "the exuberant yet intricate looping shapes merge back again into an indescribable whole," said Milan Hlaveš.

As her health deteriorated, she moved to Memphis, Tennessee where, though locked in silence, she continued to work on paintings and ceramics.

Marja Vallila deeded her parents' estate (spared during postwar and Soviet times thanks to the presence of a Finnish flag in the window and diplomatic plaque on the building) in Červený Újezd, near Prague, to be used by the community as a special education center.

== Major shows ==
- Zabriskie Gallery (1977), solo
- Newark Museum (1979), solo, (1991), "Book Series", sculpture
- Springfield Museum (1979), solo
- Seoul Arts Center (2001), solo
- U Prestenu Gallery (2001), solo
- Nancy Margolis Gallery (2000), solo
- Chodovska Tvrz, Czech Republic, (2003) solo

Her work was included in the show "Study in Materials" at Storm King Art Center in 1978 along with Nevelson, Smith, Lassaw, Calder, Hesse and Saul Baizerman as well as in the show "The Box: From Duchamp to Horn" in 1994 at Ubu Gallery. Her digital films, about the elements in her sculptures and their associations, have been screened at Millenium (2003/2004), Two Boots Pioneer Theater (2003/2004), and Zabriskie Gallery (2002).

- Tops Gallery, Memphis, Tennessee (2017)

== Permanent collections ==
- Everson Museum of Art, Syracuse, (NY): Gateway, (sculpture), wood, steel, and granite
- Kohoutov, Ceramics school: Czech Republic
- Herbert F. Johnson Museum of Art, Ithaca, (NY): Column No. 5, (sculpture) - wood, steel, stone, and concrete
- John F. Kennedy International Airport, Jamaica, (New York): Elevated Plaza, (sculpture), steel and copper
- Hampshire College Art Gallery, Amherst, (MA): Untitled, (sculpture), welded steel
- Smith College Museum of Art, Northampton, (MA): Dancing Goober, (sculpture), ceramic and platinum

== See also ==
- Ceramic art
- Assemblage (art)
