= Albert J. Zabriskie Farmhouse =

Historic house in New Jersey, United States

- U.S. National Register of Historic Places
- New Jersey Register of Historic Places
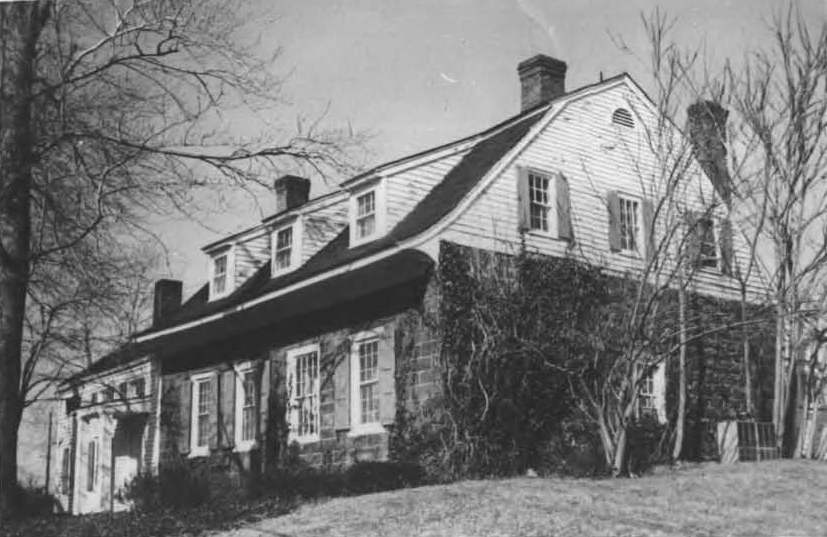
- Southern view (c.1977)

- Location within Bergen County, New Jersey Location within New Jersey Location within the United States
- Nearest city: Paramus, New Jersey
- Coordinates: 40°58′12″N 74°4′39″W
- Area: 0.5 acres (0.2 ha)
- Built: 1805
- Architectural style: New Jersey Dutch
- NRHP reference No.: 77000847
- NJRHP No.: 621

Significant dates
- Added to NRHP: November 7, 1977
- Designated NJRHP: March 28, 1977

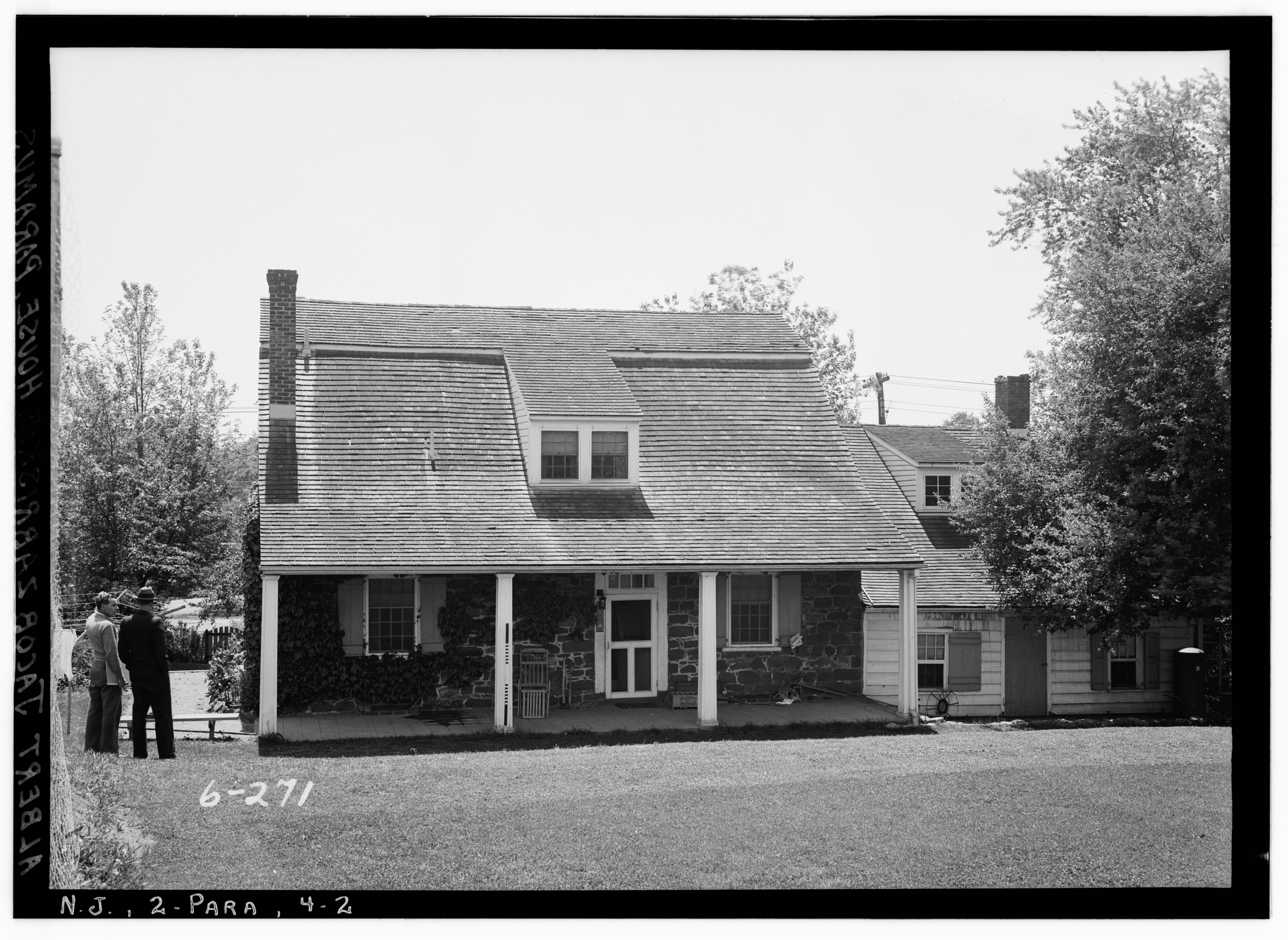
Northern view (1936)

First floor plan (1936)

The Albert J. Zabriskie Farmhouse is located at the current address of 7 East Ridgewood Avenue in Paramus, Bergen County, New Jersey, United States, just east of New Jersey Route 17. This is one of several Zabriskie historic sites associated with the descendants of prominent settler Albrycht Zaborowski (1638–1711). This stone house was built in 1805 by Albert Jacob Zabriskie (1760–1835) in the New Jersey Dutch style, owned by four generations of the family until 1924, and added to the National Register of Historic Places on November 7, 1977. Due to confusion from the street name and handwritten notes on one page of the NRHP nomination, the building is sometimes mistakenly listed as being in Ridgewood, New Jersey.

== History ==
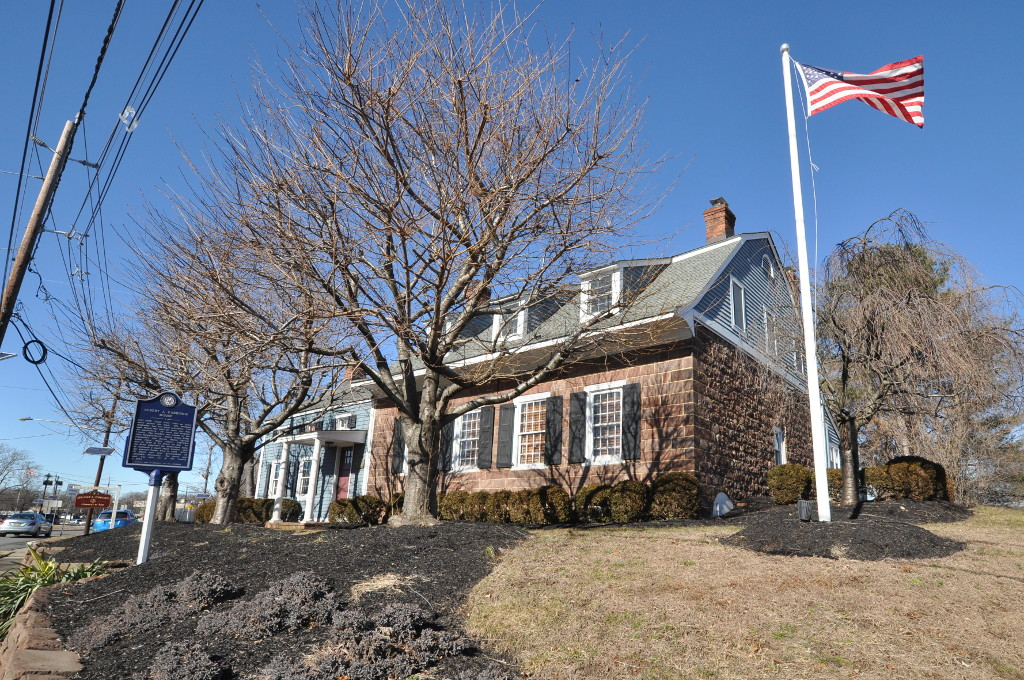
The house in 2019, then a law office

Today's East Ridgewood Avenue was once a colonial road linking the Saddle River (to the west) and the Hackensack River (to the east). Generations of the prolific Zabriskie family would raise children and crops and livestock in the area for over 200 years. Albert Jacob Zabriskie, a great-grandson of patriarch Albrycht, inherited one-third of his father's 225 acres in 1796, and built the 1805 house using materials salvaged from his father's home directly across the road. Albert Jacob left the house to his son Peter Albert Zabriskie in 1835, who left it to his own son Albert Peter Zabriskie in 1875, who left it to his niece Anna Zabriskie in 1904, who finally sold it in 1924 after 119 years of family ownership. Since then, the historic home was remodeled into professional offices, the lot was subdivided to a half-acre, and the surrounding land was converted into the Fashion Center shopping complex and a suburban housing development and NJ Route 17. Still, despite the many changes over the years, the 1805 stone farmhouse has kept virtually the same appearance from the road, and remains one of Bergen County's best-preserved examples of its Dutch Colonial heritage.

== See also ==
- National Register of Historic Places listings in Bergen County, New Jersey
