= Zabriskie Tenant House =

Historic house in New Jersey, United States

- U.S. National Register of Historic Places
- New Jersey Register of Historic Places
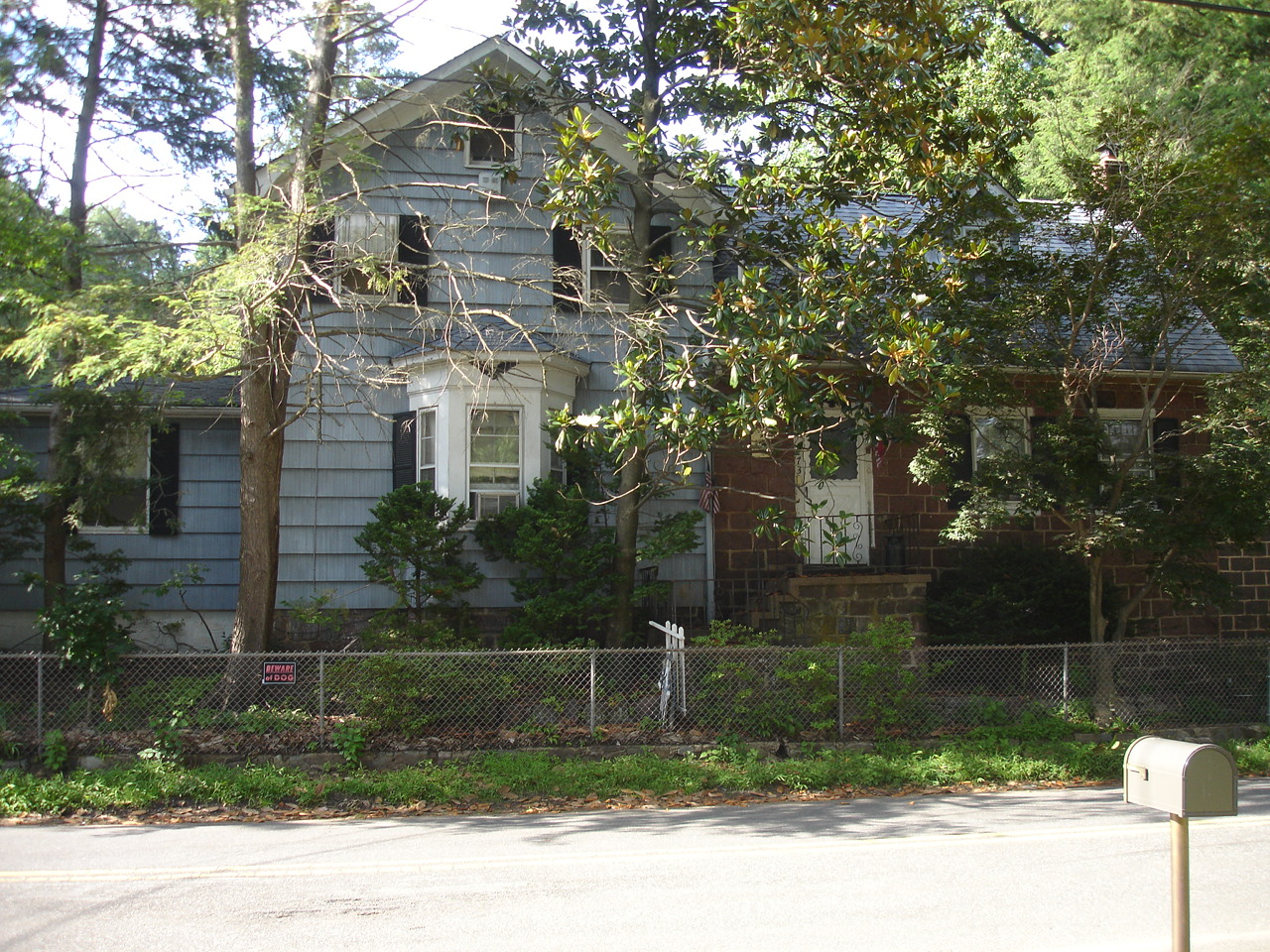
- The Zabriskie Tenant House in summer 2011

- Location within Bergen County, New Jersey
- Location: 273 Dunkerhook Road, Paramus, New Jersey
- Coordinates: 40°56′53″N 74°5′50″W
- Area: 1.2 acres (0.49 ha)
- Demolished: July 13, 2012
- MPS: Stone Houses of Bergen County TR
- NRHP reference No.: 84002602
- NJRHP No.: 623

Significant dates
- Added to NRHP: July 24, 1984
- Designated NJRHP: October 3, 1980

The Zabriskie Tenant House was a historic house of the American colonial architecture style called Dutch Colonial on Dunkerhook Road in Paramus, in Bergen County, New Jersey, United States, adjacent to the Saddle River County Park. The Zabriskie family, who farmed much of the area to the east of the Saddle River (Passaic River), built the home to house their domestic workers. It was one of the few structures left in New Jersey directly related to free African American communities in the state, and was a remnant of an African American Dunkerhook community that (until the early 20th century) included several homes and an A.M.E. Zion Church. The house was added to the National Register of Historic Places on July 24, 1984, as part of the Early Stone Houses of Bergen County Multiple Property Submission (MPS), for its significance in exploration/settlement and architecture.

== History and description ==
Developers Sal and Marcello Petruzella made a proposal to demolish the house and subdivide the land for the development of larger stylized houses with no reference to the historical community. In spite of the house's listing on the National Register of Historic Places, the New Jersey Register of Historic Places, and Paramus's own listing of historic resources, the Paramus Planning Board approved the demolition in late April, 2011, and the house was scheduled to be demolished in June, 2011. Preservation New Jersey, the state's historic preservation advocacy group, put the house on its 2012 Most Endangered Historic Properties List. Local historians and preservationists, including Peggy Norris, Ted Manvell, and H. Michael Gelfand, worked out a plan to move the house to Bergen Community College for an educational adaptive reuse. This plan was supported by the County's Board of Chosen Freeholders, the Bergen County Executive, and the administration of Bergen Community College. The college's campus was also a part of the Zabriskie landholdings, and began to draw up plans for the placement of the house and its use in an educational function. The county was in the process of petitioning the state for funds to move and rehabilitate the structure when on July 13, 2012, the developers Sal and Marcello Petruzella demolished the Zabriskie Tenant House.

The demolition was a significant loss for the future understanding of the history of Dutch agricultural settlers in the 17th and 18th centuries, African Americans as slaves and freed peoples in New Jersey, and the rural nature of Bergen County that gave way to the massive suburban development after World War II. The house was of a similar plan as the Naugle House, across the Saddle River in the Borough of Fair Lawn, which utilized open space funds to purchase the Naugle House. The Borough of Paramus failed to make such an effort, but in 2013 seated a Historic Preservation Commission to prevent the loss of other historic resources in the borough. That commission, however, was never legally empowered or given voice in borough decisions and so has had no positive impact on historic preservation in a construction-friendly municipality.

== See also ==
- National Register of Historic Places listings in Bergen County, New Jersey
