= Virginia M. Zabriskie =

American art dealer and gallerist (1927–2019)

- Born: Virginia Ione Marshall; July 15, 1927; New York City
- Died: May 7, 2019 (aged 91); New York City
- Occupations: Art dealer, gallerist

Virginia Marshall Zabriskie (July 15, 1927 – May 7, 2019), born Virginia Marshall, was an American art dealer and gallerist, owner of New York's Zabriskie Gallery from 1954 to 2010.

== Early life and education ==
Virginia Ione Marshall was born in New York City, the daughter of Arthur Albert Marshall and Agnes Ione Watters Marshall. Her father ran a restaurant; her mother had been an actress.

She earned a bachelor's degree in art history at New York University in 1949, with a senior thesis on Marcel Duchamp, Jacques Villon, and Raymond Duchamp-Villon. She met modern art promoter Walter Pach while she was a college student; through him, she met Marcel Duchamp, Edward Hopper, and other contemporary artists in New York. She pursued further art studies in Paris, where she was also the first American to serve as an English-language docent at the Louvre.

== Career ==
Zabriskie owned and ran Zabriskie Gallery in New York from 1954 to 2010, and Galerie Zabriskie in Paris from 1977 to 1998. Her shows featured sculptors Elie Nadelman and Mary Frank, and painters Pat Adams, Lester Johnson, Nell Blaine and Miyoko Ito. She also mounted historical shows at Zabriskie, including "Surrealism 1936: Objects, Photographs, Collages and Documents" (1986). The Paris gallery emphasized photography in its shows, and included a bookstore. She was first to show a group of abstract ink drawings by sculptor Richard Stankiewicz after they were discovered in the 1980s. She preferred the occupational title "gallerist" to art dealer, saying "My work is less about showing any given client a work of art for sale, but rather presenting an artist's work."

She received La Medaille de la Ville de Paris from the mayor of Paris in 1999. In 2004, a collection of essays titled Zabriskie: Fifty Years marked a milestone in her work.

== Personal life ==
Virginia Marshall married twice, to George Zabriskie in 1952 and to Arthur Cohen in 1970. Both marriages ended in divorce. She had dystonia, a neurological condition that affected her speech and the use of her hands. She died in 2019, aged 91, at her home in New York City. She donated many of the Zabriskie Gallery records to the Archives of American Art at the Smithsonian Institution, and other materials to the University of Delaware.

In November 2019, CHART, a gallery in Tribeca, presented After Virginia, an exhibition that revisited Zabriskie's 1999 show, Abstraction in Photography.
