= Zabriskie Gallery =

Art gallery in Manhattan, New York

- Location of Zabriskie Gallery in New York City
- Established: 1954
- Location: 41 East 57th Street, 4th Floor, Manhattan, New York City, United States
- Coordinates: 40°45′29″N 73°57′46″W
- Website: www.zabriskiegallery.com

The Zabriskie Gallery was a gallery founded in New York City by Virginia Zabriskie in 1954.

== Early years ==
Virginia Zabriskie started the art gallery with a one-dollar down payment. It had formerly been the Korman Gallery, a cooperative that included the painters Pat Adams and Clinton Hill (a New York School artist).

== Zabriskie Gallery, France ==
By the 1980s, Zabriskie had two galleries in New York (one for painting and one for sculpture) and another in Paris. The Paris gallery focused on photography and allowed for a "lively exchange" between American and French artists during the 1980s and 1990s. She was honored in 1999 with the Medaille de la Ville de Paris.

== Artists ==
Artists who have exhibited in the Zabriskie Gallery include Abraham Walkowitz (Zabriskie held his correspondence and papers). Zabriskie was a supporter of the work of Elie Nadelman and is credited with "rescuing him from neglect." Pat Adams held her first solo show there, and her 2005 exhibition Pat Adams Paintings 1954–2004, held in early 2004 at the Zabriskie Gallery, cemented Adams's reputation as "one of the most important abstract painters." The gallery has also worked with Ansel Adams, Harry Callahan, Alexander Archipenko, Alfred Stieglitz, Dorothea Tanning, Marsden Hartley, Marja Vallila among others.

== Current ==
The gallery was located at 57th St and 1st Ave in New York City. The Paris location closed in 1998. The New York location closed in 2010. Between the years 1992 and 2011 Virginia Zabriskie donated the papers to the Smithsonian Archives of American Art.
