= Pat Adams =

American modernist painter (born 1928)

- Born: July 8, 1928 (age 97); Stockton, California, U.S.
- Education: University of California, Berkeley (BA 1949); California College of the Arts; University of the Pacific; School of the Art Institute of Chicago; Brooklyn Museum Art School
- Known for: Painting
- Awards: Fulbright Scholarship (1956), Jimmy Ernst Award (1996)

Pat Adams (born July 8, 1928) is an American modernist painter and mixed-media artist. She is a member of the National Academy of Design.

== Biography ==
Adams was born in Stockton, California. She received a Bachelor of Arts degree from the University of California, Berkeley in 1949, after which she took courses at the California College of Arts and Crafts, University of the Pacific and the Art Institute of Chicago. In 1950 she moved to New York City and enrolled in the art program at the Brooklyn Museum Art School where she studied under Max Beckmann, John Ferren and Reuben Tam.

In 1956 she won a Fulbright scholarship to study in France, where she traveled with her husband, Vincent Longo, who is also a painter and printmaker. Adams taught at Bennington College from 1964 to 1993, and was appointed Visiting Professor of Art to Yale University's Master of Fine Arts program from 1990 to 1994.

== Style ==
Her style, a mixture of modernism and abstraction, is described by Adams as "yield[ing] more to qualities than ideas, more to matter than its naming". She continues, "...I sense a release of potentiality, a release of more than we know....I conclude that of whatever else the artist's effort may consist, it abounds in restless projective extension; innately it bounds toward the vision of an anticipatory not-as-yet."

== Exhibitions ==
Adams's first solo exhibition was in 1954 at the Korman Gallery, later renamed the Zabriskie Gallery, under the ownership of Virginia Zabriskie. Adams had 20 solo exhibitions at the Zabriskie Gallery between 1954 and 1997. Additionally, her art was featured at various other venues including the Fleming Museum at the University of Vermont, Burlington (1977), the Rutgers University Art Gallery in New Brunswick, New Jersey (1978), and the Jaffe/Friede/Strauss Gallery, Dartmouth College, New Hampshire. In 1993 she was made a member of the National Academy of Design. In 1994, she exhibited at Dartmouth College's Art Gallery.

== Collections ==
Whitney Museum, New York; Hirshhorn Museum and Sculpture Garden, Washington, D.C.; Yale University, New Haven, Connecticut; Berkshire Museum, Pittsfield, Massachusetts; New Britain Museum of American Art, Connecticut; Fleming Museum, University of Vermont-Burlington; Bennington College, Vermont; University of North Carolina, Greensboro; University of California, Berkeley; University of Arizona, Tucson; Rutgers University, New Brunswick, New Jersey: Palm Springs Desert Museum, California; Corcoran Gallery, Washington, D.C.; National Academy of Art, New York; Brooklyn Museum of Art, Montclair Museum, New Jersey.

== Reviews ==
Her first solo exhibition at Zabriskie was described in the New York Times as "quiet, but intense," while simultaneously abstract and "filled with lyrical allusions". Among the exhibited works was, Ribbons of Breath (1954), which used brightly colored, intertwining shapes in gouache and watercolor. Adams work was later characterized as "suggest[ing] a desire to assert the tangible actuality of what appears before the eye".

In 1960, Dore Ashton asserted that Pat Adams's works detail her "visual experiences of nature and her spiritual insights about the cosmos". Ashton places Adams in the same category as artists like Odilon Redon and Mark Tobey, in that they each "seek to find what is 'within' the inmost secrets of the universe". Hilton Kramer further noted that Adams has a "mystical temperament" and is "extraordinarily inventive in conjuring up a world of delicate perceptions and inward feelings". Kramer also notes that her "paintings fill the eye with an almost hypnotic bath of completely delightful visual detail".

In 2003, Adams exhibited a collection of new paintings at the Zabriskie Gallery including both small and larger works. Zabriskie describes this collection as "build[ing] gritty encrustations over rudimentary patterns and shapes...result[ing] in a friction between the particular and the universal". Some paintings included in this exhibition were Into the Garden (2003), Situation (2002), Following From (2002), and What Follows (2003). What Follows, in particular, has been described as "a soft, dusty mist vibrat[ing] through the space...almost impossibly, shift[ing] on occasion into liquid, giving buoyancy to the dot-filled oval and the circles in its field".

A 50th anniversary exhibition of her first show at Zabriskie and the start of her relationship with dealer Virginia Zabriskie was held 2005. Martica Sawin's essay accompanied this exhibition, in which she describes Adams's paintings Arriving, (1994) and Late, New, Again, Round (1985) in the same in much of the same context as Ribbons of Breath. Adams's Sweetness (1990) "offers a microcosm of the many divergent possibilities one might encounter traversing the cosmos of the mind's eye", and one of her newer paintings Be/Hold (2004) "has the power to draw the eye toward the minutiae of its variegated surfaces". Overall, Pat Adams's work has been well-received, and she's even been called "one of the most important abstract painters working today".

== Awards ==
In 1995 she won the Vermont Governor's Award for Excellence in the Arts.

== Publications ==
- "Remarks on Their Medium by Four Painters" in Artforum, 1975
- "On Working" in Quadrille, Fall 1977
- Interview with Robert Boyers in Bennington Review, 1977
- "Subject and Being" in Art Journal, Spring, 1982
