= Zabriskie Point (disambiguation) =

Zabriskie Point is a place in the Death Valley National Park, United States.

Zabriskie Point also may refer to:

- Zabriskie Point (film), 1970 film by Michelangelo Antonioni
- Zabriskie Point (album), soundtrack album from the titular film
