= Annandale-on-Hudson, New York =

- Hamlet
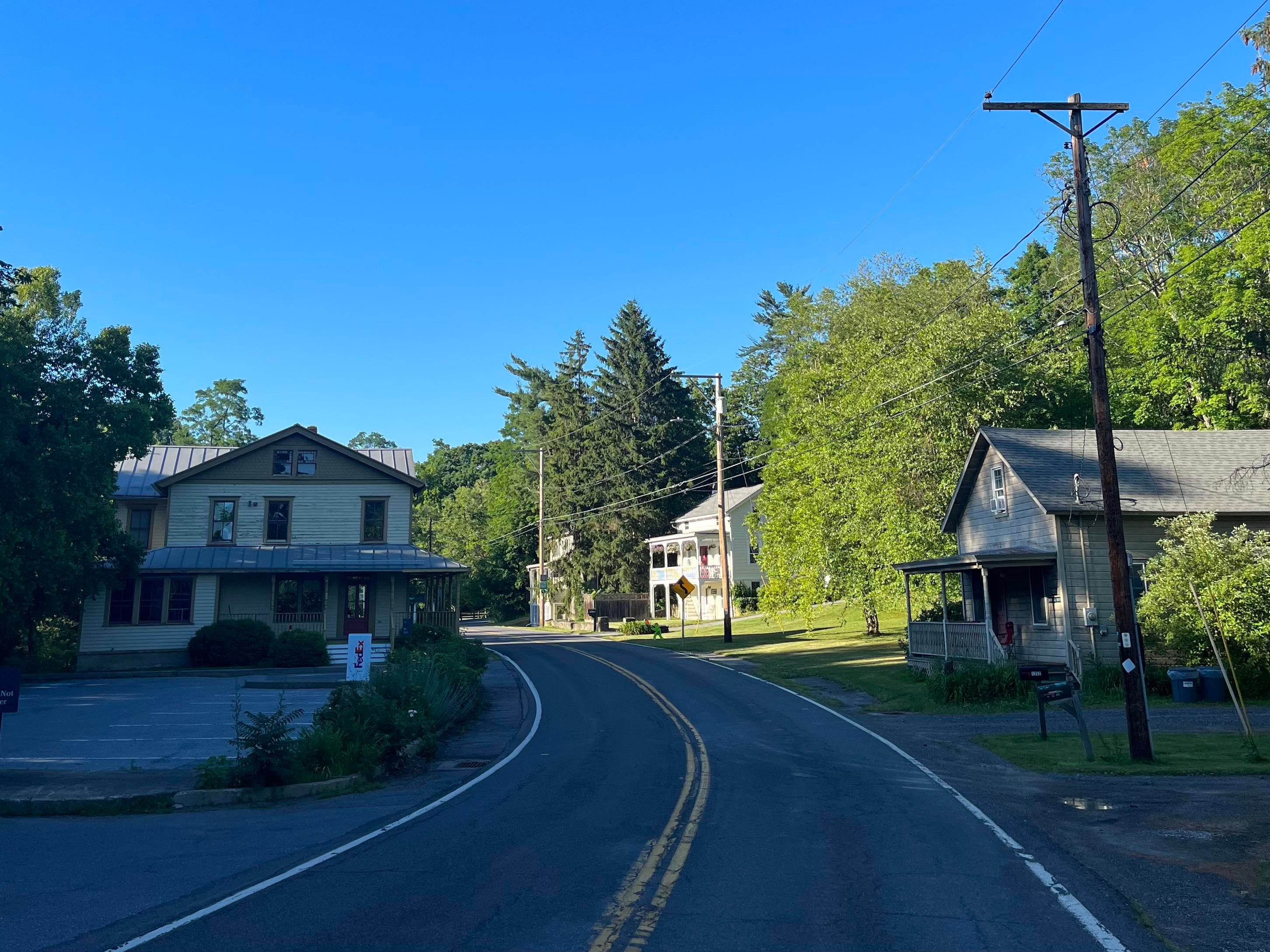
- Annandale Road

- Location in New York state
- Coordinates: 42°0′46.08″N 73°54′29.52″W
- Country: United States
- State: New York
- County: Dutchess
- Town: Red Hook
- Elevation: 154 ft (47 m)
- Time zone: UTC-5 (Eastern (EST))
  - Summer (DST): UTC-4 (EDT)
- ZIP code: 12504
- Area code: 845
- GNIS feature ID: 942492

Annandale-on-Hudson is a hamlet in Dutchess County, New York, United States, located in the Hudson Valley town of Red Hook, across the Hudson River from Kingston. The hamlet consists mainly of the Bard College campus.

== History ==
The Munsee and Muhheaconneok people were the original inhabitants of this area and, due to forced migration, now reside in Northeast Wisconsin and are known as the Stockbridge–Munsee Community.

The town takes its name from an estate donated by John Bard and his wife to Columbia University so that a college could be formed there. Today, Bard College stands on the land that John Bard donated. Bard College houses the only post office for Annandale-on-Hudson's ZIP code, 12504. The land comprising Annandale-on-Hudson, sometimes abbreviated to "Annandale", is mostly owned by Bard College. There are also a few private residences, small businesses, and undeveloped land controlled by the New York State Department of Environmental Conservation.

Annandale-on-Hudson, despite its size, has a significant history. Blithewood, a mansion designed by Francis L. V. Hoppin, an alumnus of the architectural firm of McKim, Mead and White for Andrew C. Zabriskie in 1899, replaced an earlier mansion by the same name remodeled for Robert Donaldson Jr. by architect Alexander Jackson Davis. The current Blithewood was donated to Bard College in 1951 by the Zabriskie family and, today, houses the Levy Economics Institute at Bard College. The Estate was originally part of a 1660 land transfer from Native owners to Peter Schuyler. The Manor Estate is another historical mansion located on campus.

Bard College's resident archaeologist Christopher Lindner has extensively researched the history of this area.

== Municipal services ==
Emergency services at Annandale-on-Hudson are provided by the municipal Red Hook Police Department, the Dutchess County Sheriff's Office, New York State Police, Red Hook Volunteer Fire Company, and Tivoli Volunteer Fire Company. Students, faculty, and staff of Bard College also receive on-campus emergency assistance from Bard College Safety and Security and the student-run Bard EMS.

== In popular culture ==
- Annandale-on-Hudson is the hometown of the fictional Marvel Comics character Jean Grey of the X-Men. Chris Claremont, best known for his run on the X-Men comic book, attended Bard.
- Annandale-on-Hudson is referenced in the Steely Dan song "My Old School"; members Donald Fagen and Walter Becker met while attending Bard College, and the song recounts a drug bust at Bard in 1969 in which Fagen was implicated.

== Gallery ==
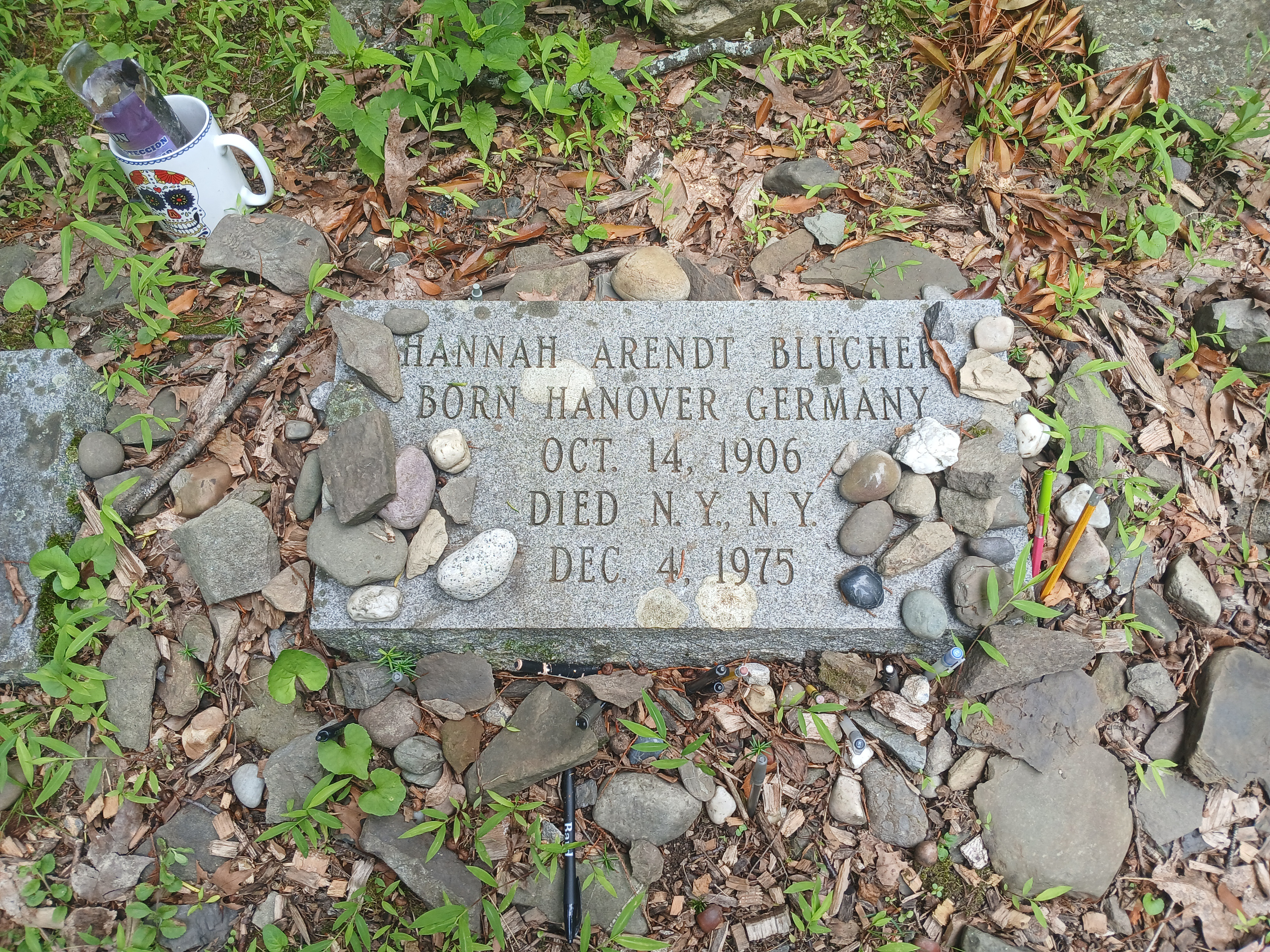
Hannah Arendt's gravestone from the Bard College cemetery
