= Edgar Zabriskie Residence =

Historic house in Nebraska, United States

- Edgar Zabriskie Mansion
- U.S. National Register of Historic Places
- Omaha Landmark
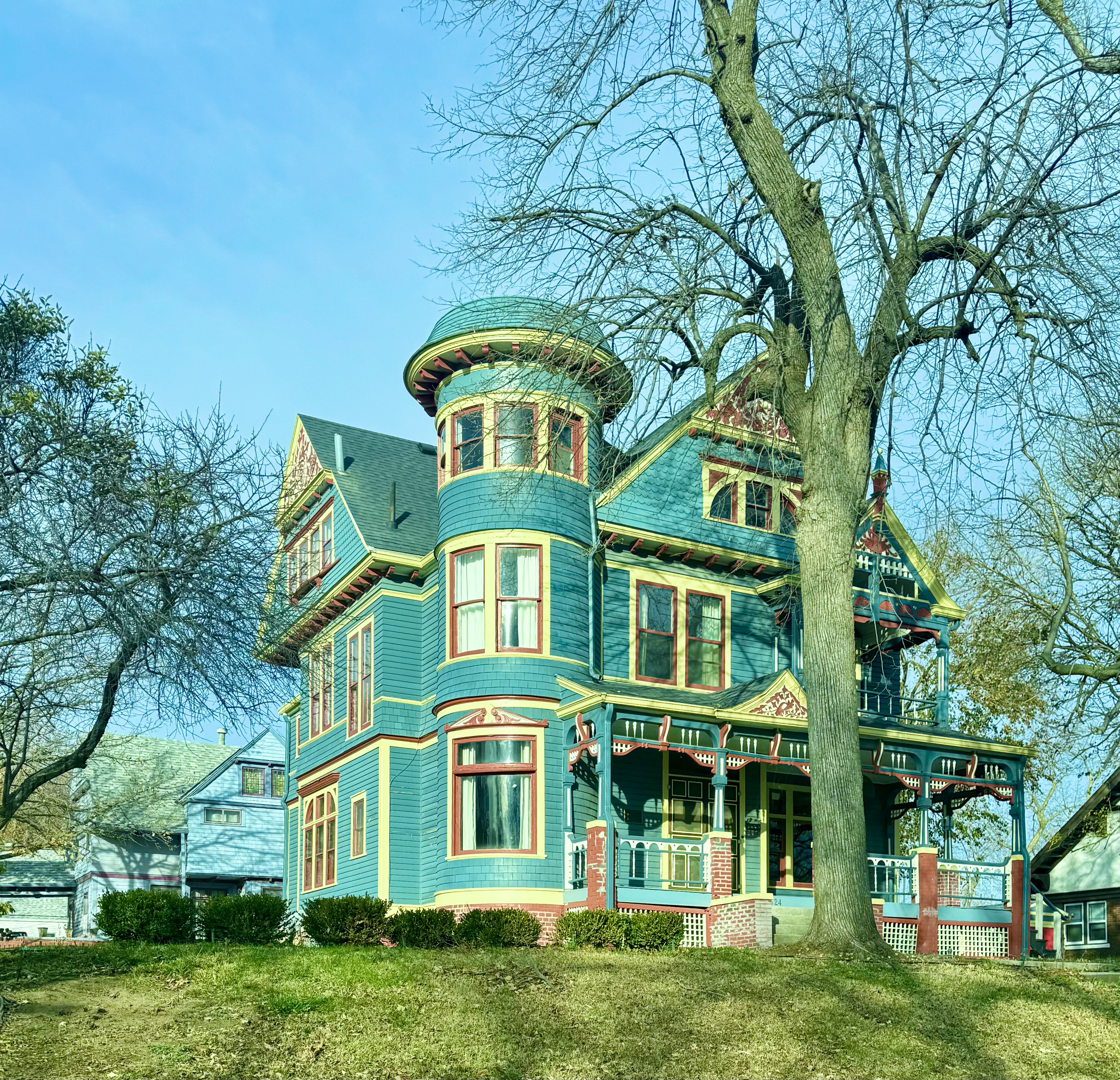
- Edgar Zabriskie Mansion - December, 2024

- Location within Nebraska Location within the United States
- Location: Omaha, Nebraska
- Coordinates: 41°16′13″N 95°57′57″W
- Built: 1889
- Architect: Fowler & Beindorff
- Architectural style: Stick/eastlake, Queen Anne
- NRHP reference No.: 78001697

Significant dates
- Added to NRHP: November 28, 1978
- Designated OMAL: October 14, 1980

The Edgar Zabriskie Residence is located at 3524 Hawthorne Avenue in the Bemis Park neighborhood of Omaha, Nebraska, United States. It was built in 1889 as one of the first homes in Bemis Park. The house was listed on the National Register of Historic Places in 1978 and was designated an Omaha Landmark in 1980.

== About ==
The Zabriskie Residence is regarded as one of the finest Queen Anne style structures in Omaha. Edgar Zabriskie was a ship officer, American Civil War veteran, Union Pacific general agent and accountant. He was one of the first purchasers of a lot in Bemis Park, a new residential suburb in the 1880s. The house was designed by a firm operated by Benjamin Fowler and Charles Beindorff, who also designed a number of important civic buildings throughout the city. After it was built the Zabriskie Residence and carriage house sat alone on a hill overlooking the Bemis Park development for nearly a decade. Not until the early 20th century did the development grow.

The Zabriskie Mansion has multiple wall surfaces, high multiple rooftops, a round turret, straight and round-arched windows and prominent gables and chimneys. The house is currently in excellent condition, including still-functioning original gas lamps throughout the house.

== See also ==
- Landmarks in Omaha
