= Zabriskie-Christie House =

Historic house in New Jersey, United States

- U.S. National Register of Historic Places
- New Jersey Register of Historic Places
- Location within Bergen County, New Jersey Location within New Jersey Location within the United States
- Location: 2 Colonial Court, Dumont, New Jersey
- Coordinates: 40°56′32″N 74°0′27″W
- Area: less than one acre
- MPS: Stone Houses of Bergen County TR
- NRHP reference No.: 83001595
- NJRHP No.: 461

Significant dates
- Added to NRHP: January 9, 1983
- Designated NJRHP: October 3, 1980

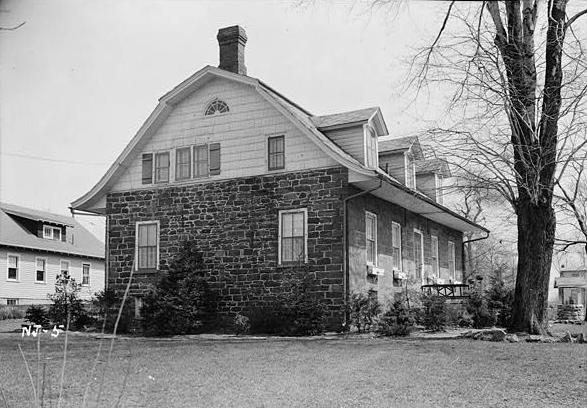
ZabriskieChristieHouse Cropped.jpg

The Zabriskie-Christie House is located in Dumont, Bergen County, New Jersey, United States. The house was added to the National Register of Historic Places on January 9, 1983.

== See also ==
- National Register of Historic Places listings in Bergen County, New Jersey
