= Zabriskie-Kipp-Cadmus House =

Historic house in New Jersey, United States

- U.S. National Register of Historic Places
- New Jersey Register of Historic Places
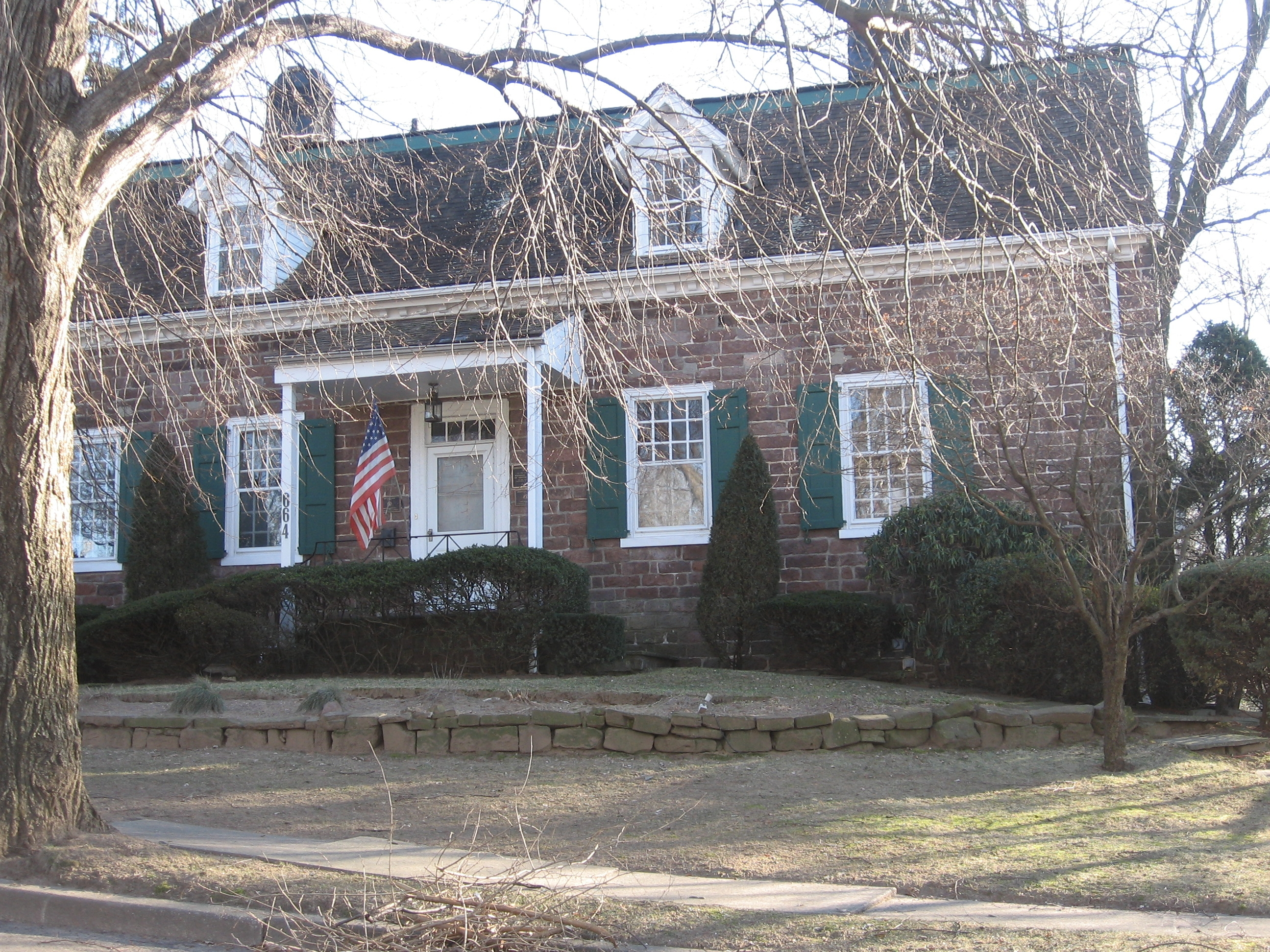

- Location within Bergen County, New Jersey Location within New Jersey Location within the United States
- Location: 664 River Road, Teaneck, New Jersey
- Coordinates: 40°53′17″N 74°1′55″W
- Area: 0.1 acres (0.040 ha)
- Built: 1751
- Architectural style: Colonial, Dutch Colonial
- NRHP reference No.: 78001741
- NJRHP No.: 702

Significant dates
- Added to NRHP: December 13, 1978
- Designated NJRHP: July 12, 1978

The Zabriskie-Kipp-Cadmus House is located in Teaneck, Bergen County, New Jersey, United States. The house was built in 1751 and added to the National Register of Historic Places on December 13, 1978.

== See also ==
- National Register of Historic Places listings in Bergen County, New Jersey
