= Seven Chimneys =

Historic house in New Jersey, United States

- U.S. National Register of Historic Places
- New Jersey Register of Historic Places
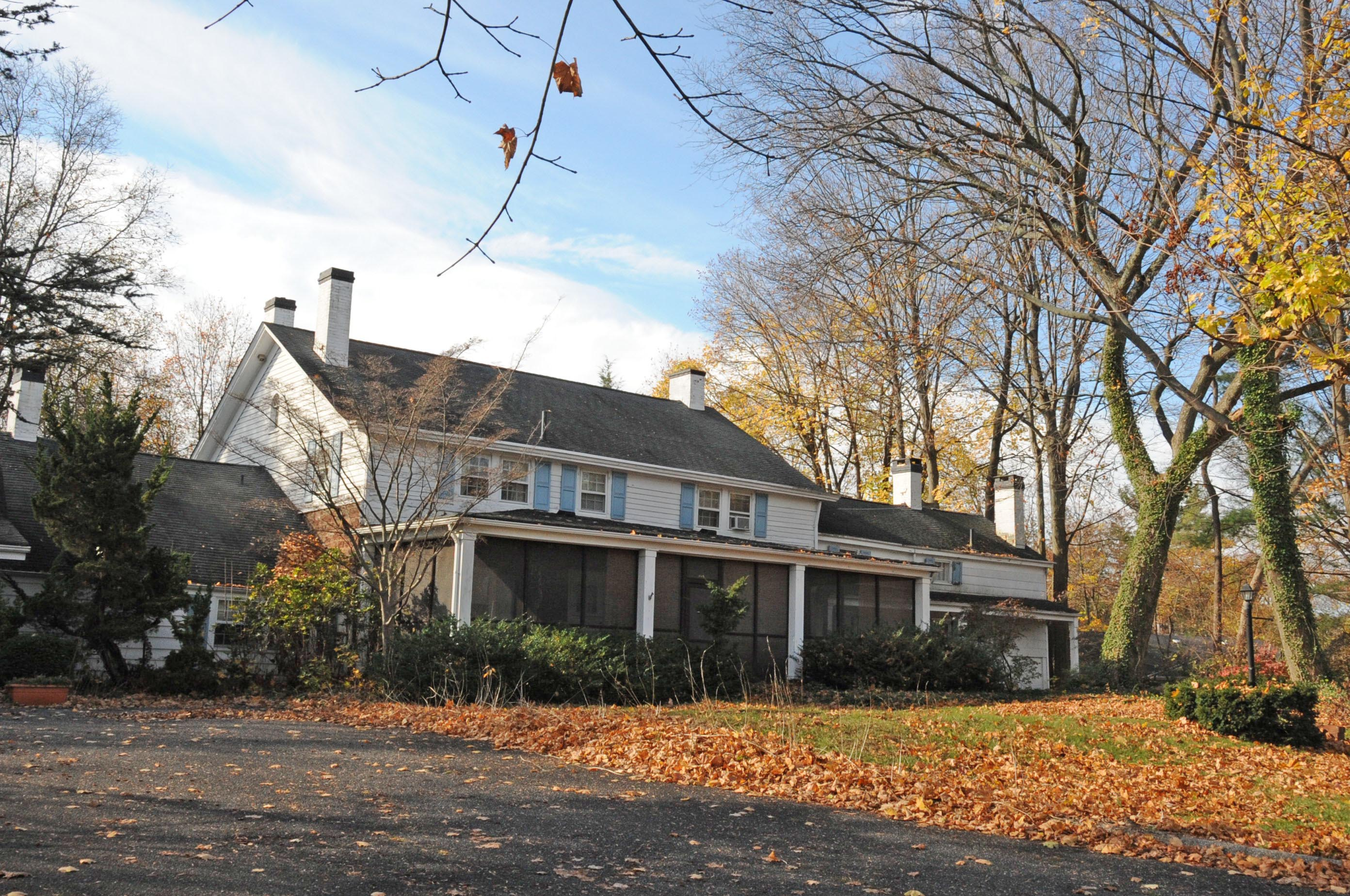
- Seven Chimneys, Township of Washington, NJ

- Location within Bergen County, New Jersey
- Location: 25 Chimney Ridge Court, Washington Township, Bergen County, New Jersey
- Coordinates: 40°58′57″N 74°3′56″W
- Area: 1 acre (0.40 ha)
- Built: 1750
- Architect: Nicholas Zabriskie
- NRHP reference No.: 71000494
- NJRHP No.: 720

Significant dates
- Added to NRHP: August 12, 1971
- Designated NJRHP: May 6, 1971

Seven Chimneys, also known as the Nicholas Zabriskie House, was built between 1745 and 1750 by Nicholas Zabriskie, an early Dutch settler in the Hudson Valley. It is the oldest house in Washington Township, Bergen County, New Jersey. Notable visitors include Theodore Roosevelt. The house was used as a stop on the Underground Railroad. Seven Chimneys was placed on the National Register of Historic Places in 1971. (Note: The Seven Chimneys house also appears in a duplicate 1983 entry on the register with the name Nicholas Zabriskie House, reference number 83001599.)

== History ==
Seven Chimneys was built between 1745 and 1750 by Nicholas Zabriskie, and was part of a 500-acre (200 ha) farm. The house is noted on the Erkine maps used by George Washington's army. For its first 158 years, Seven Chimneys remained part of the Zabriskie and extended Zabriskie family, claiming the Ackermans, Harings, and Van Emburghs as its residents, all prominent families in the area and in local history.

In 1915, William B. Howland, publisher of the Independent and Outlook, purchased Seven Chimneys as his country house. During the summers 1915 to 1917, Theodore Roosevelt visited, where he stayed in the west wing and wrote articles for Howland's publications.

In 1920, Willie Curtis Foster purchased Seven Chimneys from William Howland's son. For the next 45 years, Seven Chimneys was a working farm.

In 1965, the Fosters sold Seven Chimneys to the Reid construction company, which built the neighborhood around it. The neighborhood's cul-de-sac, Chimney Ridge Court, is named after the distinct seven chimneys of the home.

In 1965, Francis and Mary Burde purchased Seven Chimneys and lived there until 2001.

== Architecture ==
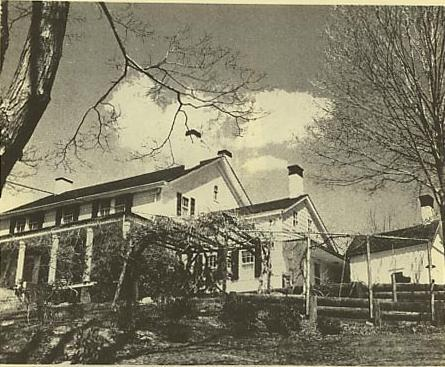
The house in 2008

Seven Chimneys is one of a dozen or so remaining examples of the original Dutch settler style located throughout the Hudson Valley region of New Jersey and lower New York state.

The foundation of Seven Chimneys is built of rough stone and lime mortar. The handcut beam frame of the original house is constructed without nails, utilizing pegged mortise and tenon joints. The exterior is constructed of hand-chiseled Hudson River sandstone. Typical of the Dutch construction of this time period, the stone is cut and finished on three sides, and unfinished, rough sandstone on the north. The north and south entrances feature matching split Dutch doors. Interior lath walls are finished with horse hair and plaster. Floors are random, original growth pine ranging from 12 to 22 inches (300 to 560 mm) in width fastened with handmade square nails. In 1770, the left and right wings were added . In 1812, the second story was added, which might explain its Federal style roof line, uncommon to Dutch houses of this period.

In 1978, a great room addition to the east wing was added, joining the detached slave kitchen to the rest of the house.

Outbuildings at Seven Chimneys include a working wellhouse and 300-foot-deep (91 m) well, and a smokehouse thought to have been built sometime in the late 17th or early 18th century.

== See also ==
- National Register of Historic Places listings in Bergen County, New Jersey
