= Garret Zabriskie House =

Historic house in New Jersey, United States

- U.S. National Register of Historic Places
- New Jersey Register of Historic Places
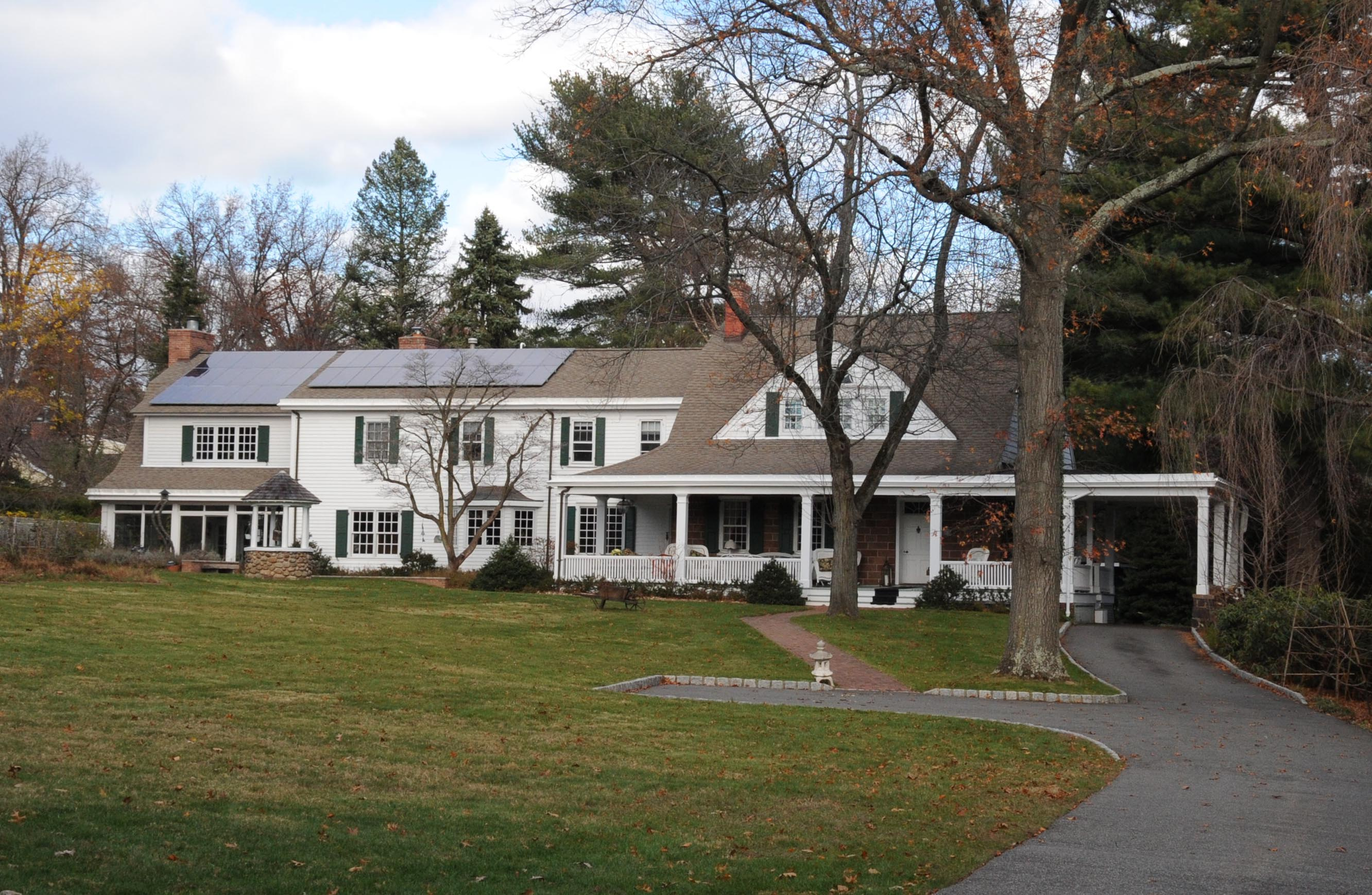
- Garret Zabriskie House in 2015

- Location within Bergen County, New Jersey Location within New Jersey Location within the United States
- Location: 317 Massachusetts Avenue, Haworth, New Jersey
- Coordinates: 40°57′19″N 73°59′25″W
- Area: 2.7 acres (1.1 ha)
- Built: 1818
- MPS: Stone Houses of Bergen County TR
- NRHP reference No.: 83001596
- NJRHP No.: 632

Significant dates
- Added to NRHP: January 9, 1983
- Designated NJRHP: October 3, 1980

Garret Zabriskie House is located in Haworth, Bergen County, New Jersey, United States. The house was built in 1818 and was added to the National Register of Historic Places on January 9, 1983.

== See also ==
- National Register of Historic Places listings in Bergen County, New Jersey
