= Zabriskie House (Ho-Ho-Kus, New Jersey) =

Historic house in New Jersey, United States

- U.S. National Register of Historic Places
- New Jersey Register of Historic Places
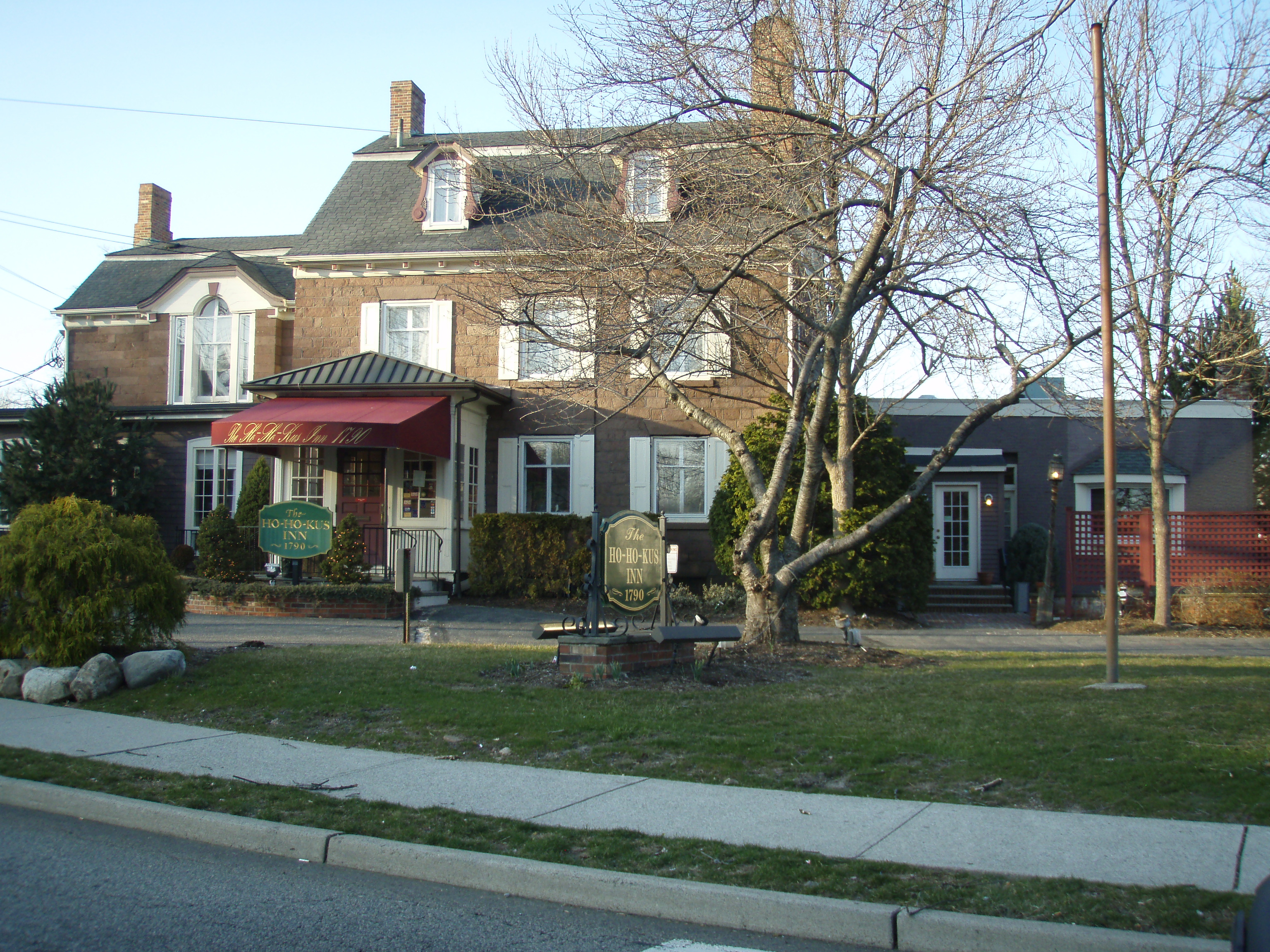
- Zabriskie House in 2008

- Location within Bergen County, New Jersey
- Location: Franklin Turnpike & Sheridan Avenue, Ho-Ho-Kus, NJ
- Coordinates: 40°59′51″N 74°6′37″W
- Built: 1796
- Architectural style: Late Victorian
- MPS: Stone Houses of Bergen County TR
- NRHP reference No.: 83001598
- NJRHP No.: 542

Significant dates
- Added to NRHP: January 10, 1983
- Designated NJRHP: October 3, 1980

The Zabriskie House, also known as the Hohokus Inn, is located in Ho-Ho-Kus, Bergen County, in the U.S. state of New Jersey. The house was added to the National Register of Historic Places on January 10, 1983.

== History ==
The home was built in 1796 by Andrew Zabriskie as a home for his son John Zabriskie. The home was later used as a parsonage. In 1890 the home was converted into a tavern. The borough of Ho-Ho-Kus purchased the home in 1941 and began leasing the home as a restaurant in 1953.

== Ho-Ho-Kus Inn ==
The Ho-Ho-Kus Inn is a restaurant that is operated within the Zabriskie House.

== See also ==
- National Register of Historic Places listings in Bergen County, New Jersey
