= Saddle River County Park =

County park in Bergen County, New Jersey

Coordinates: 40.95634°N 74.09832°W

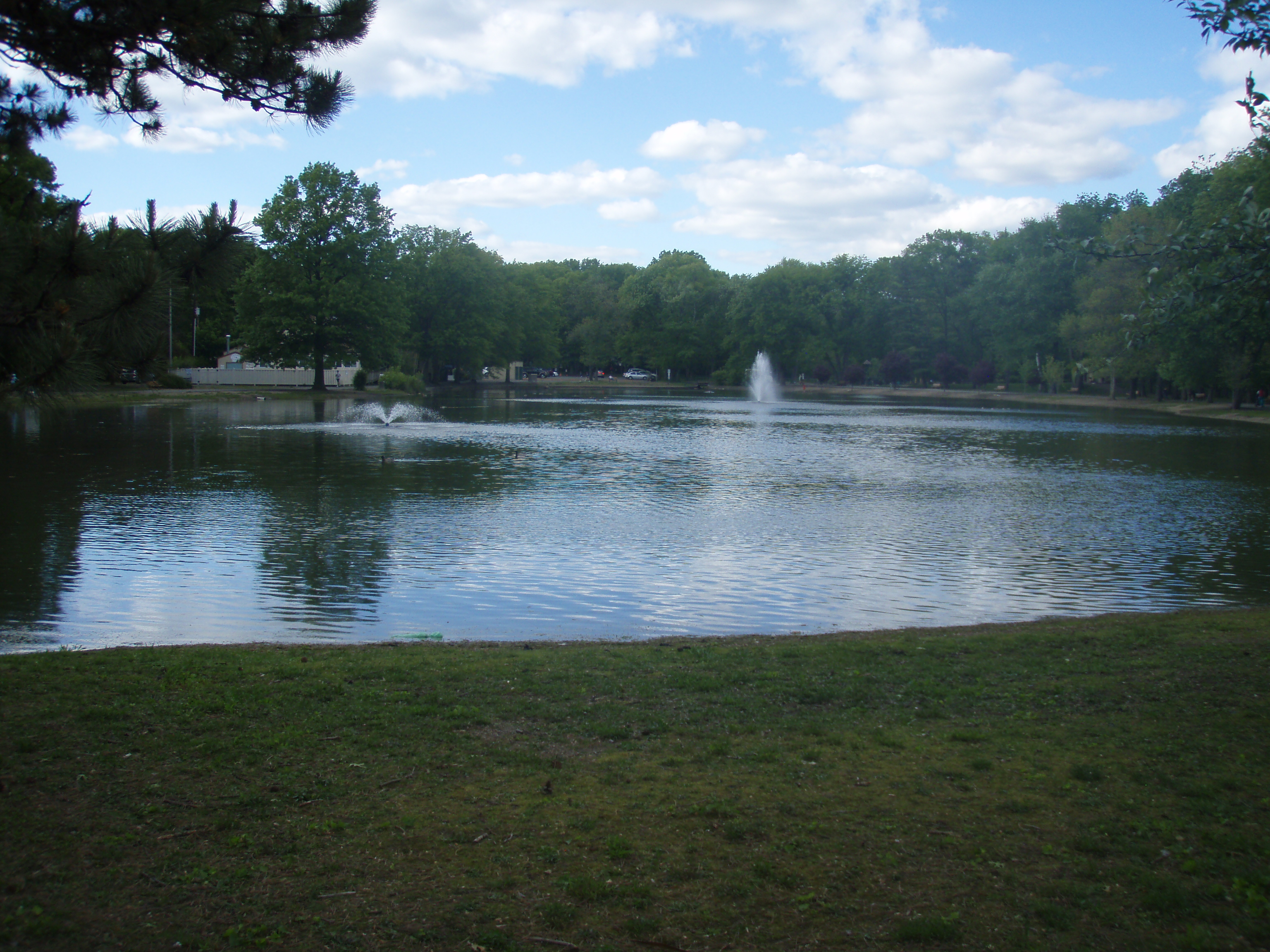
Duck Pond Area

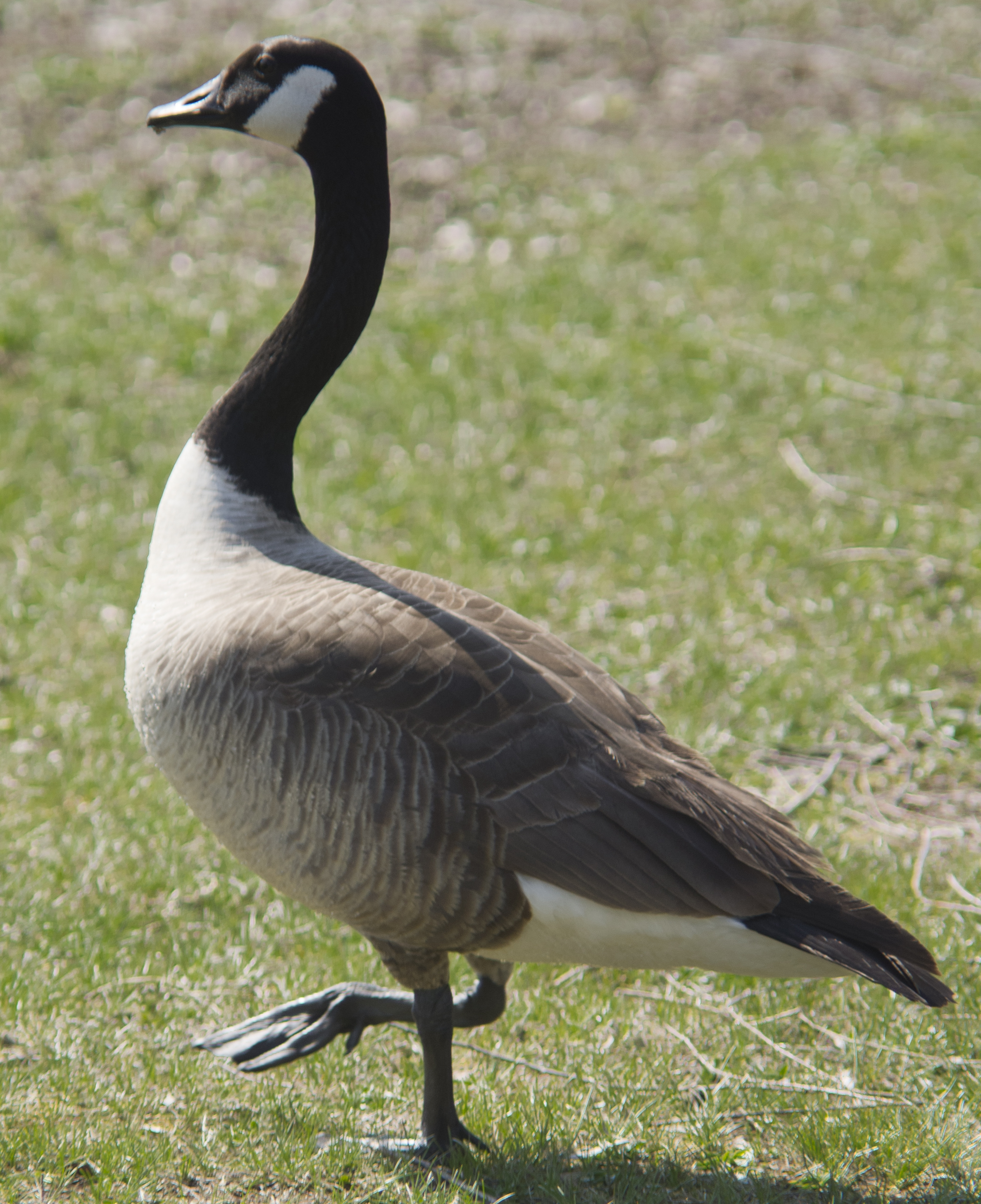
A Canada goose near the duck pond.

Saddle River County Park is a 596-acre (2.41 km^{2}) county park in Bergen County, New Jersey, United States, stretching from Ridgewood to Rochelle Park, and extends out to Glen Rock. The park is located along the Saddle River and consists of five sections, all of which are connected by a paved path that is open to both pedestrians and bicyclists.

== Sections ==
Listed from north to south:

Wild Duck Pond: located on Ridgewood Ave in Ridgewood, this area features a pond with picnic areas, a dog run, and playgrounds.

Glen Rock Area: located off Prospect Street in Glen Rock, features a pond with picnic areas, playgrounds, and tennis courts.

Dunkerhook Area: located in Paramus and Fair Lawn on Dunkerhook Road which can either be accessed from Paramus Road or Century Road, features picnic areas, playgrounds, and tennis courts. The section also contains a waterfall in the river.

Otto Pehle Area: located on Saddle River Road in Saddle Brook, features a lake with picnic areas, a softball field, basketball courts, and tennis courts.

Rochelle Park Area: located on Railroad Ave in Rochelle Park, features picnic areas, a softball field, playground, basketball courts, tennis courts, and a roller hockey rink.

== Walking/cycling trail ==
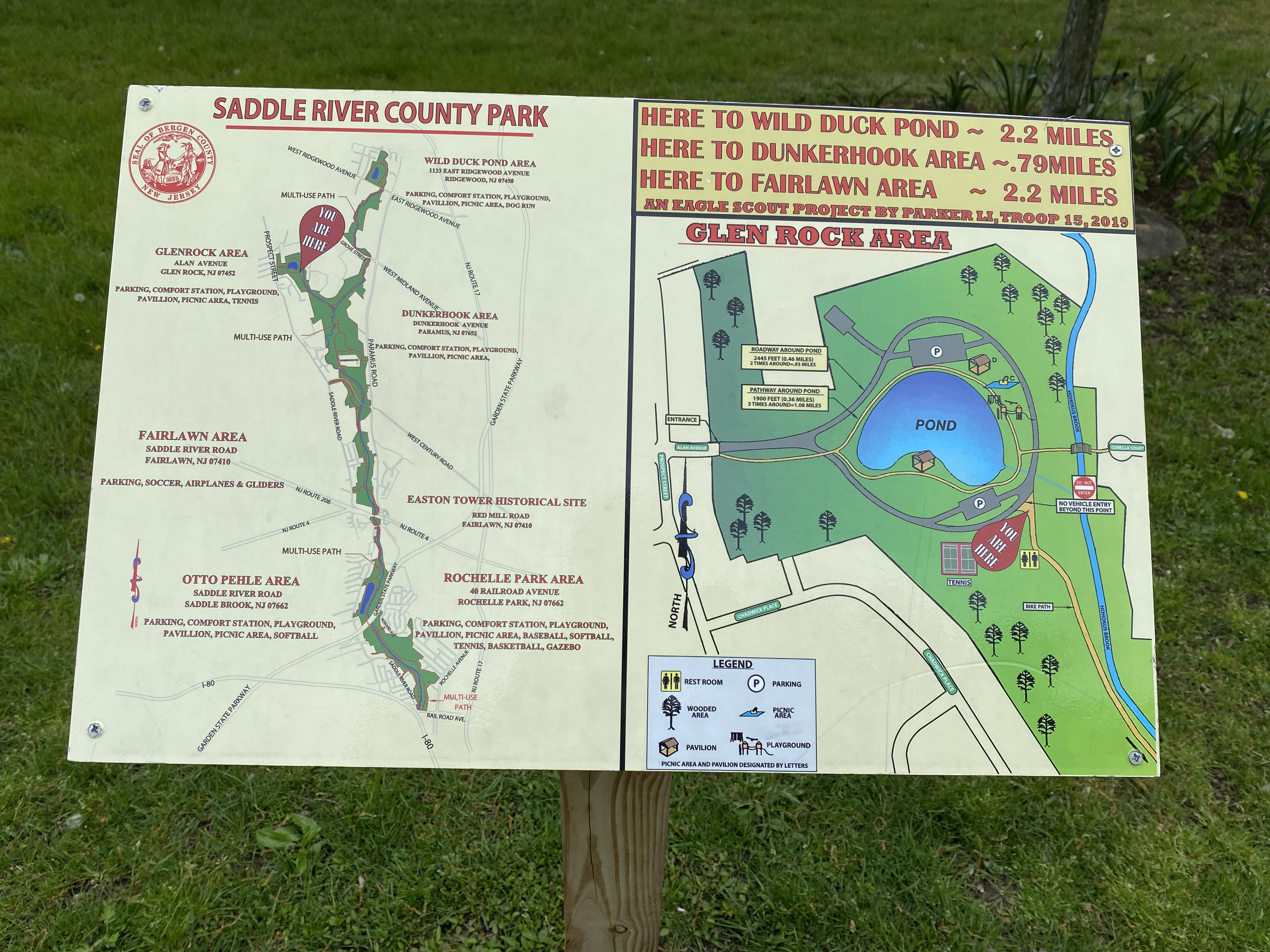
A map posted in Glen Rock outlining the park trail (left) and the Glen Rock Area (right)

The walking/cycling trail consists of 6.8 miles of paved concrete trails, stretching from either Ridgewood Duck Pond to Rochelle Park (6 miles total), or from Glen Rock Duck Pond to Rochelle Park (5 miles total). The trail is completely without cars, and prohibits all motorized vehicles, aside from electronic wheelchairs and other medical devices. There are benches laid out frequently on the trail, and water fountains and bathrooms in each of the parks. The trail has numerous path features, including 5 underpass bridges, which pass under existing roadways, and 5 bridges, which cross over various bodies of water.

The park also has several off-road trails for hiking/mountain biking which branch off the main walking trail into the woods, on dirt paths. The longest of these trails is about 2 miles long, and stretches from Fair Lawn to Paramus, and follows along the existing paved trail but on the other side of the Saddle river.

== Landmarks ==
The Saddle River County Park Trail has numerous referable landmarks aside from the 5 parks. These include:

The Waterfall: This is a small waterfall that exists in the Glen Rock section of the trail, directly after the Glen Rock path merges with the Ridgewood - Rochelle Park section of the trail. This is approximately half a mile from the Glen Rock Duck Pond, and a tenth of a mile from Dunkerhook.

Easton Tower: Also known as "The Tower" or "The Mill", this is a 20 foot high rotary mill that exists directly under Route 4 and the Paramus section of the park. This branches out of the main trail and is a popular spot for photos.

The "Hill": The "Hill", as it is referred to, is the steepest part of the trail. It is an approximately 20 foot high drop or climb (depending on the direction) at an 8% grade. This hill is in between the waterfall and Easton Tower, in Fair Lawn.

== Fishing ==
The County Park waters are stocked with trout and bass, notably at these following spots.

Glen Rock Duck Pond: The Glen Rock Duck Pond primarily has bass and sunfish, although people have caught carp and even catfish here.

Waterfall Area: This is the most popular fishing spot in the County Park. The area directly downstream of the waterfall has fast moving water, bubble water, in which people catch stocked trout and bass. The area also has sunfish, carp, and white suckers. The waterfall is specifically the widest spot to fish on the Saddle River, which follows along this trail. There are other spots along the Saddle River to fish on, but none as open as this spot.

Otto Pehle: The Otto Pehle lake primarily has bass and sunfish, although some people have caught carp and catfish here. Can get bloated on the weekends.

Ridgewood Duck Pond: The Ridgewood Duck Pond was formerly a fishing spot, but in recent years the pond has dried up substantially and there are either a few or no fish left.
