= Albrycht Zaborowski =

Polish nobleman and migrant to the Thirteen Colonies (1638–1711)

Albert Zaborowski
- Born: 1638 (possibly 1639); Angerburg (Węgorzewo)
- Died: Sep. 1, 1711; Province of New Jersey
- Other names: Albert Zabriskie, Albrecht Saborowski, Albert Saboriski
- Spouse: Machtelt Vanderlinde (m. 1677)
- Children: 5

Albrecht Zaborowski (also rendered Saborowski; anglicized as Albert Zabriskie; 1638–1711) was a Polish emigrant, one of the pioneers of European colonization in what is now New Jersey, who settled there on August 31, 1662.

== Early life and emigration ==
Saborowski, a Polish Lutheran nobleman, was born in 1638, in Angerburg (Węgorzewo) in Ducal Prussia, a vassal duchy of the Kingdom of Poland. After the Thirty Years' War upheavals in Europe, he decided to emigrate to America, to escape being drafted into army, as one of the pioneers of European colonization within the area of present-day New Jersey. In 1662 "Albert Saboriski, from Enghestburgh Prussia" arrived on board the Dutch ship De Vos (The Fox) to New Amsterdam (present-day New York City).

== Later life and death ==
Due to his good knowledge of Native American languages, mostly Lenape languages, he became a translator and mediator in negotiations between the colonists and Native American tribes, specifically the Lenape. He came into possession of a large estate within the Province of New Jersey and built a family residence in Hackensack (11,007 acres of land).

== Family ==
His marriage to Machtelt Vanderlinde on January 8, 1677 (banns on December 17, 1676) produced five children.

- Jacob Albert Zabriskie (1679–1758)
- Jan Zabriskie (1682–1766)
- Joost Zabriskie (1692–1756)
- Christian Zabriskie (1694–1774)
- Hendrikus Zabriskie (1696–?)

Jacob, the oldest son who was born in 1679 in present day Bayonne, married Antje Terhune. They had 10 children: Hendricktje, Fytje (Sophia), Marritje, Albert, Jan, Jannetje, Rachel, Machtelt, Stephen and Jacob. Jan, Joost, Christian and Hendrick, and possibly a daughter, named Matilda, who married Sylvester Earle.

Albert died in 1711 and was buried in Hackensack (now Tenafly, New Jersey).

He originated America's Zabriskie family, described as one of "the oldest Polish families in America" which produced several eminent descendants, such as Peter Zabriskie son of Jan Zabriskie, Albrecht's second son. Peter Zabriskie (1721-1791) opened his home to General George Washington as the Revolutionary Army retreated across the Hudson River from the battle of New York City. Peter Zabriskie served as a Colonel in the Revolutionary Army and was captured by the British Army. Legend has it that he said to the British upon hearing one of them exclaim, "Long live King George," "Yes, indeed! Long Live King George Washington!" Peter escaped his captors and lived on to be a Judge for Bergen County, New Jersey and moreover one of three Ratifying Signers of the United States Constitution representing Bergen County, New Jersey.
