= Saddle River (Passaic River tributary) =

River in New Jersey and New York, United States

Coordinates: 40°57′24″N 74°06′13″W

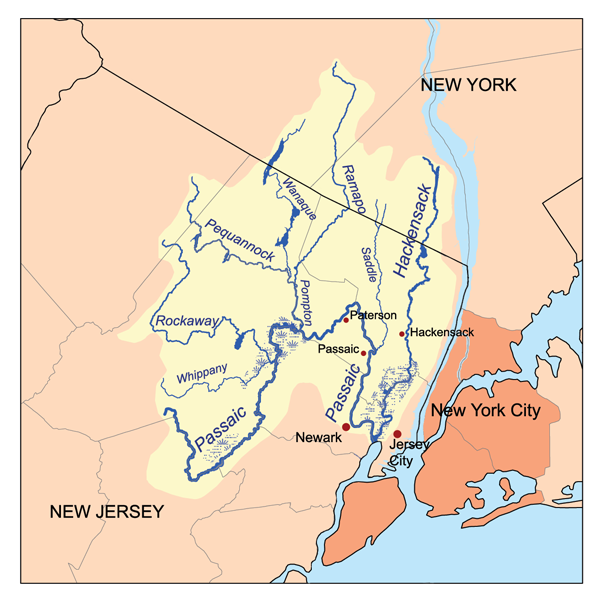
Map of the Passaic/Hackensack watershed.

The Saddle River is a tributary of the Passaic River located in the U.S. states of New Jersey and New York. It runs through densely populated suburban areas for much of its course. The river takes its name from the river near Saddell in Argyll and Bute in Scotland.

The headwaters of the Saddle River are in the piedmont terrain of Rockland County in southern New York. Streams from this area flow south, forming the Saddle River at their confluence, two miles south of the New York state border, in the town of Upper Saddle River, New Jersey.

From its feeder streams in Upper Saddle River and the source in Airmont, New York, the Saddle River continues south through much of Bergen County, New Jersey, for 16.3 miles, passing through the towns of Saddle River, Waldwick, Ho-Ho-Kus, Ridgewood, Glen Rock, Paramus, Fair Lawn, Rochelle Park, Saddle Brook, Lodi, Garfield, and Wallington.

The Ho-Ho-Kus Brook, a major tributary, joins the Saddle River at the Dunkerhook area of Saddle River County Park. Their confluence marks the border of four Bergen County towns: Ridgewood, Paramus, Glen Rock and Fair Lawn.

The terminus of the Saddle River is at Garfield and Wallington, where the waterway empties into the Passaic River. The Passaic River drains at Newark Bay and via Arthur Kill and Kill van Kull to the Atlantic Ocean. The northern part of the Saddle River watershed drains an area between the Ramapo River watershed to the west, and the Hackensack River watershed to the east.

Fish species in the Saddle River include largemouth bass, Brown bullhead, yellow bullhead, longnose dace, white sucker, tessellated darter, blacknose dace, various species of sunfish, American eel, carp and different varieties of trout. Most of the trout are stocked by the New Jersey Division of Fish and Wildlife, although the uppermost reaches of the river and some of its tributaries hold wild brown trout. These wild trout are threatened by increased residential use of lawn fertilizer which contributes to algae and weed growth.

== Tributaries ==
- Ho-Ho-Kus Brook

== See also ==
- List of rivers of New Jersey
