= De Niro (surname) =

De Niro is an Italian surname. People with the surname include:

- Drena De Niro (born 1967), American actress and film producer
- Grace Hightower De Niro (born 1955), American philanthropist, socialite, actress, and singer
- Raphael De Niro (born 1976), New York City real estate broker
- Robert De Niro (born 1943), American actor, director and producer
- Robert De Niro Sr. (1922–1993), American abstract expressionist painter
- Virginia De Niro alias Virginia Admiral (1915–2000), American painter and poet
