= Stadlen =

Stadlen is a surname. Notable people with the surname include:

- Hedi Stadlen, Austrian Jewish philosopher, political activist, and musicologist, better known in Sri Lanka as Hedi Keuneman
- Lewis J. Stadlen, American stage and screen character actor
- Nicholas Stadlen, British former High Court judge, son of Hedi and Peter
- Peter Stadlen, Austrian composer, pianist, and musicologist
- Allen Swift, professional name of Ira Stadlen, American actor and writer
