= Evelina Pereira =

Portuguese actor and model (born 1978)

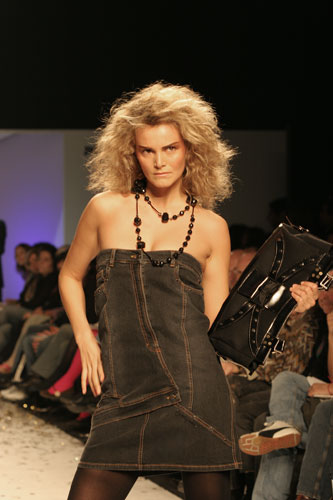
- Pereira on 4 April 2015
- Born: 11 May 1978 (age 48); Porto, Portugal
- Occupations: Actress; model; singer
- Years active: 1995–present
- Notable work: Backlight; Friends with Benefits
- Title: Best Model of the World
- Term: 2002 (with Kıvanç Tatlıtuğ)
- Predecessor: Şenay Akay; Sylvain Larochell
- Successor: Yuliya Lishchuk; Stefan Alie
- Height: 1.80 m (5 ft 11 in)
- Beauty pageant titleholder
- Title: Best Model of the World 2002
- Hair colour: Blonde
- Eye colour: Brown
- Major competitions: Best Model of the World (winner)

Evelina Pereira (born 11 May 1978) is a Portuguese film, television, and stage actress, singer, and top model who was crowned Best Model of the World in 2002. As the 22nd holder of the title, she became the first woman and second person from Portugal to win Best Model of the World.

She studied singing, piano, and violin at the Porto Music Conservatory. In 1999, she was a lead singer in the pop girl group Antilook with fellow models Luísa Beirão, Raquel Loureiro, Rute Marques, and Vera Deus.

She has played roles in a variety of films and television series, including the 2003 Portuguese drama film The Fascination, 2007 American comedy heist film Ocean's Thirteen, 2007 American martial arts–buddy action comedy film Rush Hour 3, 2009 Portuguese short drama film Eu, Ofélia, 2010 Portuguese–American mystery and action drama film Backlight, and the 2011 American romantic comedy film Friends with Benefits starring Justin Timberlake and Mila Kunis. Backlight, in which Evelina Pereira played the lead character Helena, was the second highest-grossing Portuguese film in 2010.

Her television work includes appearances in Made in Portugal (1995), Herman 98 (1998), O Amigo Público (1998), Gala Portugal Fashion (1999), Mundo VIP (2001), Só Visto (2005), Nip/Tuck (2006), Fama Show (2009), Entourage (2009), DeLuxe (2010), As Tardes da Júlia (2010) 5 Para a Meia-Noite (2010), A Última Ceia (2010), and Destino Imortal (2010).

Pereira lived in Italy, England, France, Greece, Spain, and Brazil. She speaks fluent English, French, Italian, and Spanish in addition to her native language Portuguese. In 2015, she moved to New York City and is currently living in Los Angeles County, California.

== Early life ==
Evelina Pereira was born on 11 May 1982 in Porto, northwestern Portugal, to a family of artists. She got involved in theatre productions, ballet, and jazz dance at a very young age. She studied singing, piano, and violin at the Porto Music Conservatory. She was a lead singer in the all-female band Antilook that consisted of four other models, Vera Deus, Rute Marques, Raquel Loureiro, and Luísa Beirão.

== Pageantry ==
=== Best Model of the World ===
Pereira competed in the 15th Best Model of the World pageant and won the title "Best Model of the World" on 30 November 2012, succeeding Best Model of the World 2011 Şenay Akay of Turkey. As the 22nd holder of the title, she became the first woman from Portugal to win Best Model of the World. This is the second time that Portugal has won the title, after Miguel Teixeira won the male division in 1996.

== Acting career ==
She has played roles in a variety of films and television series.

Her debut film role was in the 2003 Portuguese drama film The Fascination. She has acted in American and Portuguese films, including the 2007 American comedy heist film Ocean's Thirteen, 2007 American martial arts–buddy action comedy film Rush Hour 3, 2009 Portuguese short drama film Eu, Ofélia, 2010 Portuguese–American mystery and action drama film Backlight, and the 2011 American romantic comedy film Friends with Benefits starring Justin Timberlake and Mila Kunis.

Backlight, in which Evelina Pereira played the lead character Helena, was the second highest-grossing Portuguese film in 2010.

Her television work includes appearances in Made in Portugal (1995), Herman 98 (1998), O Amigo Público (1998), Gala Portugal Fashion (1999), Mundo VIP (2001), Só Visto (2005), Nip/Tuck (2006), Fama Show (2009), Entourage (2009), DeLuxe (2010), As Tardes da Júlia (2010) 5 Para a Meia-Noite (2010), A Última Ceia (2010), and Destino Imortal (2010).

== Filmography ==
=== Film ===
Year	Title	Role	Notes
2003	The Fascination	Journalist Patrícia Neves	
2007	Ocean's Thirteen	Informer	
2007	Rush Hour 3	Foreign Minister	
2009	Eu, Ofélia		Short film
2010	Backlight	Helena	
2011	Friends with Benefits	Belgian	

=== Television ===
Year	Title	Role	Notes
1995	Made in Portugal	Herself	
1998	Herman 98	Herself	Episode: "1.13"
1998	O Amigo Público	Herself (as Antilook)	
1999	Gala Portugal Fashion	Herself	Television film
2001	Mundo VIP	Herself	
2005	Só Visto	Herself	
2006	Nip/Tuck	Muse	
2009	Fama Show	Herself	Episode: "17 May 2009"
2009	Entourage	Bianca	
2010	DeLuxe	Herself	Episode: "16 January 2010"
2010	As Tardes da Júlia	Herself	Episode: "22 January 2010"
2010	5 Para a Meia-Noite	Herself	Episode: "27 January 2010"
2010	A Última Ceia	Herself	
2010	Destino Imortal	Valentina	
