= List of Portuguese films of 2004 =

A list of Portuguese films that were first released in 2004.

| Release date | Title | Director | Cast | Genre | Notes | Ref |
|---|---|---|---|---|---|---|
| January 29 | Portugal S.A. | Ruy Guerra | | | 20,121 admissions; Entered into the 26th Moscow International Film Festival | |
| April 1 | Out There | Fernando Lopes | | | 9,364 admissions | |
| April 1 | Tudo Isto É Fado | Luís Galvão Teles | | | 6,766 admissions | |
| April 8 | Daqui Prá Alegria | Jeanne Waltz | | | 352 admissions | |
| April 29 | Maria e as Outras | José de Sá Caetano | | | 5,418 admissions | |
| May 13 | The Miracle According to Salomé | Mário Barroso | Ana Bandeira, Nicolau Breyner | | 20,232 admissions | |
| May 27 | Desassossego | Catarina Mourão | | | 375 admissions | |
| September 16 | André Valente | Catarina Ruivo | | | 2,197 admissions | |
| October 21 | In the Darkness of the Night | João Canijo | | | 13,060 admissions | |
| October 21 | Querença | Edgar Feldman | | | 78 admissions | |
| November 4 | Kiss Me | António da Cunha Telles | | | 18,693 admissions | |
| November 25 | A Costa dos Murmúrios | Margarida Cardoso | | | 12,231 admissions | |
| December 2 | Autografia | Miguel Gonçalves Mendes | | | | |
| December 9 | Sorte Nula | Fernando Fragata | | | 48,968 admissions | |

== See also ==
- 2004 in Portugal
