= Videira (surname) =

Videira is a surname. Notable people with the surname include:

- Amélia Videira (born 1945), Portuguese actor
- Joaquim Videira (born 1984), Portuguese fencer
- Michael Videira (born 1986), American soccer player
- Patrick Videira (born 1977), French football manager

== See also ==
- Vieira
