= Stodolsky =

Stodolsky is a surname. Notable people with the surname include:

- Catherine Stodolsky (1938–2009), Jewish-American historian and teacher
- Leo Stodolsky, former director of the Max Planck Institute for Physics
