= Fragata (surname) =

Fragata is a surname. Notable people with the surname include:

- Fernando Fragata (1965–2024), Portuguese film director
- Gaspar Fragata (born 1972), Angolan swimmer
