= Catherine Stodolsky =

Catherine Sylvie Stodolsky (née Ekstein; August 26, 1938 in Paris, France – January 31, 2009 in Munich, Germany) was a Jewish-American historian and teacher whose Ph.D thesis was about German female schoolteachers in the 1800s. She is remembered most for her work chronicling her family's tribulations in the Nazi period, most notably the resistance fighter and author Lisa Fittko and the painter Malva Schalek, both of whom have attained considerable fame. She is a member of the Simon-Schalek-Ekstein family and was writing a family biography based on three generations of women of this family of independent thinkers, artists and intellectuals. Her efforts at consolidating her considerable groundbreaking research on these and other historical figures of the time (Hans Fittko for example) in a book was cut short by her death in 2009. So far, it seems no efforts have been made to complete her work although she was almost ready to be published at the time of her death.

She had two sons and a husband.
