= Defying the Law =

1924 film

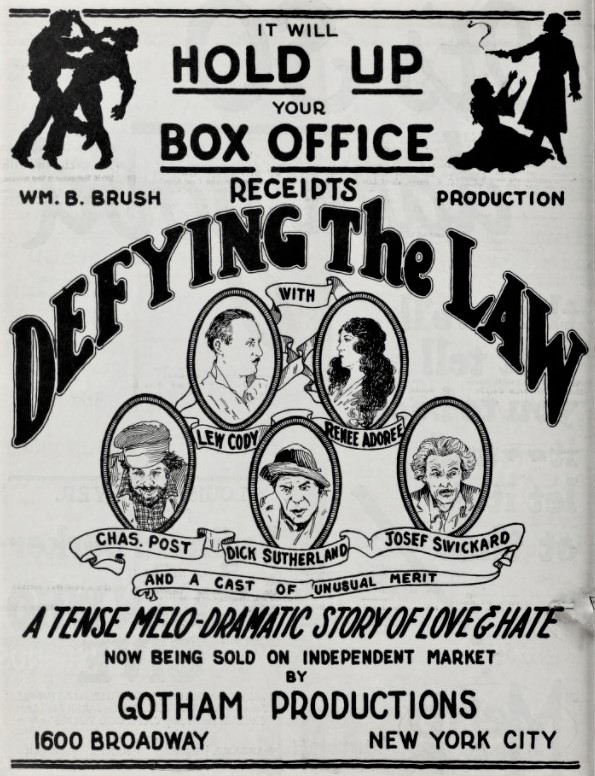
- Directed by: Bertram Bracken
- Written by: Andrew Bennison; Bertram Bracken; John T. Prince
- Starring: Lew Cody; Renée Adorée; Josef Swickard
- Cinematography: Gordon Pollock
- Edited by: Leonard Wheeler
- Production company: Gotham Pictures
- Distributed by: Lumas Film Corporation
- Release date: June 3, 1924
- Running time: 50 minutes
- Country: United States
- Language: Silent (English intertitles)

Defying the Law is a 1924 American silent drama film directed by Bertram Bracken and starring Lew Cody, Renée Adorée, and Josef Swickard.

== Cast ==
- Lew Cody as Pietro Savori
- Renée Adorée as Lucia Brescia
- Josef Swickard as Michelo Brescia
- Charles A. Post as Francisco
- Naldo Morelli as Guido Savori
- Dick Sutherland as Luigi Bevani
- James B. Leong as Dr. Chong Foo
- Evelyn Adamson as Maria Baretto
- Kathleen Chambers as Sylvia Baretto
- Marguerite Kosik as Alicia Bevani

== Bibliography ==
- Munden, Kenneth White. The American Film Institute Catalog of Motion Pictures Produced in the United States, Part 1. University of California Press, 1997.
