= Les Unwanted de Europa =

- Italian poster
- Gli Insdesiderati D'Europa
- Directed by: Fabrizio Ferraro
- Written by: Fabrizio Ferraro (from an idea by Claudia Landi)
- Produced by: Lluís Miñarro, Fabio Parente
- Cinematography: Giancarlo Leggeri, Simone Borgna
- Edited by: Fabrizio Ferraro
- Music by: John Cage
- Production companies: Eddie Saeta, Passepartout Cooperativa Sociale
- Release date: 26 January 2018 (International Film Festival Rotterdam)
- Running time: 112 minutes
- Countries: Italy; Spain
- Languages: French, Catalan, German

Les Unwanted de Europa (Italian: Gli indesiderati d'Europa) is a 2018 Spanish-Italian historical black and white film directed by Fabrizio Ferraro.

== Synopsis ==
The film depicts the final journey of philosopher Walter Benjamin across the Pyrenees in September 1940, during which Benjamin was guided by Lisa Fittko along a trail (the Route Lister) along which Catalans and internationalist militants had previously fled the Franco regime into France during the Spanish Civil War; six months after, Benjamin was amongst the first of a number of groups of Jews, communists and dissidents fleeing Nazi-occupied France into Spain. Upon arrival in Portbou, the Spanish police threatened to turn back the refugees, and Benjamin committed suicide overnight. The film does not show his death, instead depicting the journey itself in the style of Slow Cinema, with minimal dialogue (selections from Benjamin's writings and conversations between the travellers, as well as between Benjamin and a librarian at the Bibliothèque Nationale, discussing Nietzsche) and sporadic use of music (by John Cage). Benjamin's journey is intercut with a journey along the reverse route by three anti-fascist militiamen in February 1939. The film ends with Benjamin calling out "Blanqui! Blanqui! Talk to me, I'm listening! I hear you" and a long, unmoving shot of Benjamin asleep on the ground.

== Production ==
The film stars Euplemio Macrì as Walter Benjamin and Catarina Wallenstein as Lisa Fittko. Author, musician and artist Pau Riba also features as one of the militiamen. Dialogue is predominantly French, including selections from Benjamin's writings, as well as Catalan and German. Music selections are taken from John Cage's Quartets.

The film was shot in Lazio, Italy; Barcelona, Spain; Banyuls-sur-Mer, Pyrénées-Orientales, France; Portbou, Girona, Catalonia, Spain; and La Vajol, Girona, Catalonia, Spain.

The film premiered on 26 January 2018 at the Rotterdam International Film Festival. It was subsequently released on 24 April 2018.

The film is an Italian-Spanish co-production between Passepartout, Eddie Saeta and Rai Cinema, in collaboration with the Jean Vigo-Cinémathèque Euro-regional Institute of Perpignan.

== Cast ==
- Euplemio Macrì as Walter Benjamin
- Catarina Wallenstein as Lisa Fittko
- Raphaël Bismuth-Kimpe as Joseph Gurland
- Marta Reggio as Henny Gurland
- Vicenç Altaió as Librarian
- Marco Teti as Militiaman
- Pau Riba as Militiaman
- Bruno Duchêne as Militiaman

== Reception ==
The film has received a relatively limited theatrical release, though it was shown on the streaming website MUBI in January 2019. It has received some critical discussion in Italian-language film journals, notably by critic Valerio Carando, who praises Ferraro's use of "openings, uncertainties, those that for institutional cinema are only imperfections, fragility to be discarded." Meanwhile, academic and critic Roberto Pittaluga discusses the film in the context of the European migrant crisis and the rise of Fascism in the 21st century, as well as Benjamin's own thought, writing: "Les unwanted de Europa is a film about migration and exile at the time they happen, neither before nor after but in that time and that space between, the spacetime of the no longer and the not yet. And Ferraro intends, in a very Benjaminian way, to show that time and that space."
