= Destino Imortal =

2010 Portuguese TV series

- Also known as: Immortal Destiny
- Written by: Artur Ribeiro
- Directed by: António Borges Correia, José Manuel Fernandes and Artur Ribeiro
- Starring: Pedro Barroso; Catarina Wallenstein; Rogério Samora; Maria João Luís; Evelina Pereira; Jorge Corrula
- Country of origin: Portugal
- Original language: Portuguese

Production
- Producers: Artur Ribeiro; António Borges Correia; José Manuel Fernandes
- Running time: 110 minutes

Original release
- Release: 24 January 2010

Destino Imortal (Immortal Destiny) is a Portuguese six-episode mini-series whose plot unfolds in a vampire universe. Broadcast by TVI, the miniseries debuted on January 24, 2010. The miniseries was written by Artur Ribeiro and directed by António Borges Correia, José Manuel Fernandes, and Artur Ribeiro.

== Plot summary ==
Miguel (Pedro Barroso) and his mother suffer a car accident; Miguel's mother dies, but the boy miraculously survives without any injuries. Given that his father died before he was born, he goes on to live with his grandmother in Sintra. There he is reunited with Carlos (Pedro Caeiro), his best childhood friend. Miguel asks for a transfer to the local university in Sintra and pursues a degree in history. On the first day of lectures, before entering the Medieval History classroom, Miguel watches someone approach. A girl walks in his direction, and as she enters their eyes immediately meet. Her name is Sofia (Catarina Wallenstein). Miguel and Sofia immediately feel an explosive and overwhelming attraction. The presence of Sofia will also awaken unknown abilities in Miguel, both physically and mentally.

Though Miguel and Sofia do not know it, their destinies are connected. Sofia is a vampire that belongs to the family of Hector (Rogério Samora), Lídia (Maria João Luís), and the provocative Valentina (Evelina Pereira). Sofia is not a mere vampire; she is the next step in vampiric evolution, because she is immune to sunlight. Therefore, she is protected by Hector and Lídia, envied by Valentina and coveted by Hector's creator, the deadly Victor (Jorge Corrula). Like Sofia, Miguel is not a mere human. The first episode suggests that he may be the son of the vampire Charles, which makes him a dhampir and, consequently, gives him powers against the vampires. This is explained by the fact that damphyrs inherit the powers of vampires, but none of their weaknesses.

== Main cast ==
- Pedro Barroso - Miguel Nabuco
- Catarina Wallenstein - Sofia Wagner
- Pedro Caeiro - Carlos (character)
- Jorge Corrula - Victor (character)
- Filipe Crawford - Professor Lopes
- Maria d'Aires - Julieta (personagem)
- Duarte Gomes - Gonçalo (character)
- Catarina Gouveia - Carolina (character)
- Eurico Lopes - Faustino (character)
- Maria João Luís - Lídia (character)
- Gracinda Nave - Professora Regina
- Evelina Pereira - Valentina (character)
- Rogério Samora - Hector Bettencourt
- Rodrigo Saraiva - Luís (character)
- Jorge Silva - Comandante Hilário
- Amélia Videira - Antónia (character)

== Additional cast ==
- Francisco Macau - Viegas
- Simão Biernat - João (character)
- Joana Palet - Filipa (character)
- Emanuel Arada - Lúcio Loureiro
- Pedro Rodil - Tosso
- Filipe Leroux - Inspector Tiago Varte
- Wagner Borges -
- José Neto - Inspector Samuel Martins

== Episodes ==
- 1 e 2: 24 January 2010
- 3 e 4: 31 January 2010
- 5 e 6: 7 February 2010

== See also ==
- Vampire film
- List of vampire television series
