= Beirão =

Beirão can refer to people or things from Beira, Portugal (a region) or Beira, Mozambique (a city). It translates as "Beiran".

People with the surname:

- Luísa Beirão, a Portuguese fashion model

Things with the name:

- Licor Beirão, a Portuguese liqueur
