= Viegas =

Viegas (or Viégas) is a Portuguese surname of visigothic origin. Notable people with the surname include:

- Acacio Gabriel Viegas (1856–1933), Goan physician
- Ariel Viegas, Argentinian footballer
- Ana Viegas (born 1992), Portuguese footballer
- Brás Viegas (1553–1599), Portuguese Jesuit
- Carlos Viegas Gago Coutinho, Portuguese geographer
- Eba Viegas (born 1991), Portuguese football player
- Edon Júnior Viegas Amaral (born 1994), Brazilian-Portuguese footballer
- Edmilson Viegas (born 1996), Santomean football player
- Elizabeth Viegas (born 1985), Angolan handball player
- Douglas Viegas (born 1979), Brazilian coach, politician and internet personality
- Fabiano Cezar Viegas (born 1975), Brazilian footballer
- Fernanda Viégas (born 1971), Brazilian information scientist
- Inez Viegas, Brazilian actress
- Maria Terezinha Viegas (born 1964), East Timorean politician
- Maria Ângela Guterres Viegas Carrascalão (born 1951), East Timorean politician
- Mário Viegas Carrascalão (1937-2017), East Timorean politician
- Mário Viegas (1948-1996), Portuguese actor
- Moninho Viegas, o Gasco (born 950), Portuguese knight
- Manuela Viegas (born 1957), Portuguese film director and editor
- João Viegas Carrascalão (1945–2012), East Timorese politician
- Joelma Viegas (born 1986), Angolan handball player
- José Viegas Filho (born 1942), Brazilian diplomat
- Ricardo Viegas (born 1992), Portuguese footballer
- Rui Pedro Viegas Silva Gomes Duarte (born 1978), former Portuguese footballer
- Osvi Viegas, Indian singer and composer
- Savia Viegas, Indian artist
- Vicente Viegas (born 13th century), Portuguese lord
- Venzy Viegas, Indian politician
