= Piano Concerto (Schoenberg) =

1942 composition by Arnold Schoenberg

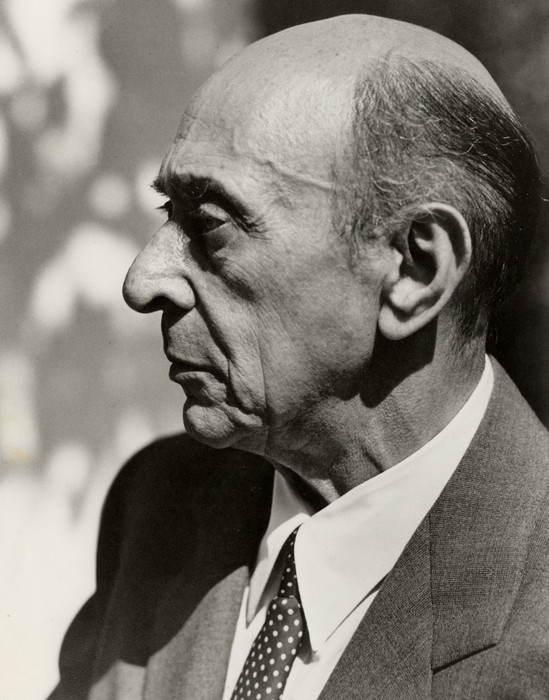
Arnold Schoenberg in Los Angeles, 1947

Arnold Schoenberg's Piano Concerto, Op. 42 (1942) is one of his later works, written during his exile in the United States. It consists of four interconnected movements: Andante (bars 1–175), Molto allegro (bars 176–263), Adagio (bars 264–329), and Giocoso (bars 330–492).

The concerto was initially the result of a commission from Oscar Levant. Around 20 minutes long, its first performance was given on February 6, 1944, at NBC Orchestra's Radio City Habitat in New York City by Leopold Stokowski and the NBC Symphony Orchestra with Eduard Steuermann at the piano. The first UK performance was on 7 September 1945 at the BBC Proms with Kyla Greenbaum (piano) conducted by Basil Cameron. The first German performance took place at the Darmstadt Summer School on 17 July 1948 with Peter Stadlen as the soloist.

== Twelve-tone technique ==
Opening melody (mm. 1–8), constructed from a statement of the tone row (P0). Note the repetition of pitches nine through eleven (t, 6, 8). Play (MIDI)

The piece features consistent use of the twelve-tone technique and only one tone row ("the language is very systematic, it's the true dodecaphonic Schoenberg",) though not as strictly as Schoenberg once required (for example, the ninth, tenth and eleventh tones of the series are repeated before the twelfth tone is first heard).

The opening melody is 39 bars long and presents all four modes of the tone row in the following order: basic set, inversion of retrograde, retrograde, and inversion. Both of the inversions are transposed. Four different types of row partitioning are evident: linear, by dyads or tetrachords, free, and by trichords. Linear presentations are ordered, strict presentations of either complete rows or component hexachords, and dominate the Andante and Giocoso movements.

The second type symmetrically divides the twelve-tone aggregate into either six dyads or three tetrachords, and is found in the Molto allegro. The third type consists of irregular presentations of segments or fragments of the row, and is used mainly in the Adagio section. The last type, trichordal partitioning, is found throughout the concerto, and is a two-dimensional design created from the discrete trichords of complexes made from pairs of inversionally combinatorial rows.

== Programmatic aspects ==
To aid Oscar Levant, for whom the Piano Concerto was originally composed, Schoenberg provided what he called "a few explanatory essays":

Life was so easy
Suddenly hatred broke out
A grave situation was created
But life goes on

Although this program was not included in the published score, Schoenberg told his student Marion Bauer that "for sometime [sic] I have not been against program music".

== Neoclassicism and form ==
Former Schoenberg student Lou Harrison said, "One of the major joys ... is in the structure of the phrases. You know when you are hearing a theme, a building or answering phrase, a development or a coda. There is no swerving from the form-building nature of these classical phrases. The pleasure to be had from listening to them is the same that one has from hearing the large forms of Mozart. ... This is a feeling too seldom communicated in contemporary music, in much of which the most obvious formal considerations are not evident at all. ... The nature of his knowledge in this respect, perhaps more than anything else, places him in the position of torch-bearer to tradition in the vital and developing sense". The concerto has been compared with the music of Johannes Brahms by Mitsuko Uchida, Sabine Feisst and AllMusic.

Aimard described the sections as follows:

1. "very Viennese," containing a "waltz"
2. full of, "anxious fragmentation," and the "sort of free Expressionist gestures that fueled his middle period"
3. "very expressive, sombre and tragic," "slow," containing a "Funeral March"
4. "very ironic and very varied in terms of character"

Stravinsky has criticized the piano writing in the concerto. Mitsuko Uchida, describing the work as very difficult for the pianist, points out that Schoenberg did not play the piano very well and that he "had no intention of writing effectively, or comfortably" for the instrument.
