= Backlight (film) =

- Portuguese: Contraluz
- Directed by: Fernando Fragata
- Written by: Fernando Fragata
- Produced by: Fernando Fragata; Sandra Menino
- Starring: Joaquim de Almeida; Evelina Pereira; Scott Bailey
- Cinematography: Fernando Fragata; Daniel Herman
- Edited by: Fernando Fragata; Olena Kuhtaryeva
- Music by: Nuno Malo
- Production company: Virtual Audiovisuais
- Release date: 22 July 2010 (Portugal)
- Running time: 90 minutes
- Countries: Portugal, United States
- Language: English
- Budget: $4 million
- Box office: € 378.809,36

Backlight (Portuguese: Contraluz) is a 2010 Portuguese–American mystery and action drama film directed by Fernando Fragata. It stars Joaquim de Almeida, Evelina Pereira, and Scott Bailey.

Backlight was the second highest-grossing Portuguese film in 2010.

== Cast ==
- Joaquim de Almeida – Jay
- Evelina Pereira – Helena
- Scott Bailey – Matt
- Michelle Mania – Lucy's mother
- Skyler Day – Lucy
- Joseph Hagler (as Joey Hagler) – Daniel
- Donovan Scott – Old farmer
- Ana Cristina de Oliveira – Motel Receptionist
