= Rogério Samora =

Portuguese film and television actor (1958–2021)

- Born: José Rogério dos Anjos Filipe da Conceição Samora; 28 October 1958; Lisbon, Portugal
- Died: 15 December 2021 (aged 63); Amadora, Portugal
- Occupation: Actor
- Years active: 1980–2021

José Rogério dos Anjos Filipe da Conceição Samora (28 October 1958 – 15 December 2021) was a Portuguese film, television and stage actor.

== Biography ==
He appeared in more than one hundred films since 1980.

On 20 July 2021, Rogério Samora suffered two cardiorespiratory arrests during recordings of SIC's soap opera Amor Amor. Subsequently, he was hospitalized in a coma. He died on 15 December 2021, at the age of 63.

== Career ==
=== Selected filmography ===
Film
Year	Title	Role	Notes
2009	Eccentricities of a Blonde-haired Girl		
2007	The Lovebirds		
2002	Two		
2001	Who Are You?		
2000	April Captains		
1996	Party		
1994	The Lion King	Scar (voice, Portuguese dub)	
1993	Abraham's Valley		
1989	Solidão, Uma Linda História de Amor		
1988	The Cannibals		

TV
Year	Title	Role	Notes
2011–2012	Rosa Fogo		
2010	Destino Imortal		
2010	Mar de Paixao		
2006-2007	Jura		
1993	A Banqueira do Povo		
