= Beauty and the Paparazzo =

Beauty and the Paparazzo (Portuguese: A Bela e o Paparazzo) is a 2010 Portuguese movie directed by António-Pedro Vasconcelos starring Soraia Chaves and Marco d'Almeida. It was the highest-grossing Portuguese film in 2010.
