= Catarina Wallenstein =

Portuguese actress

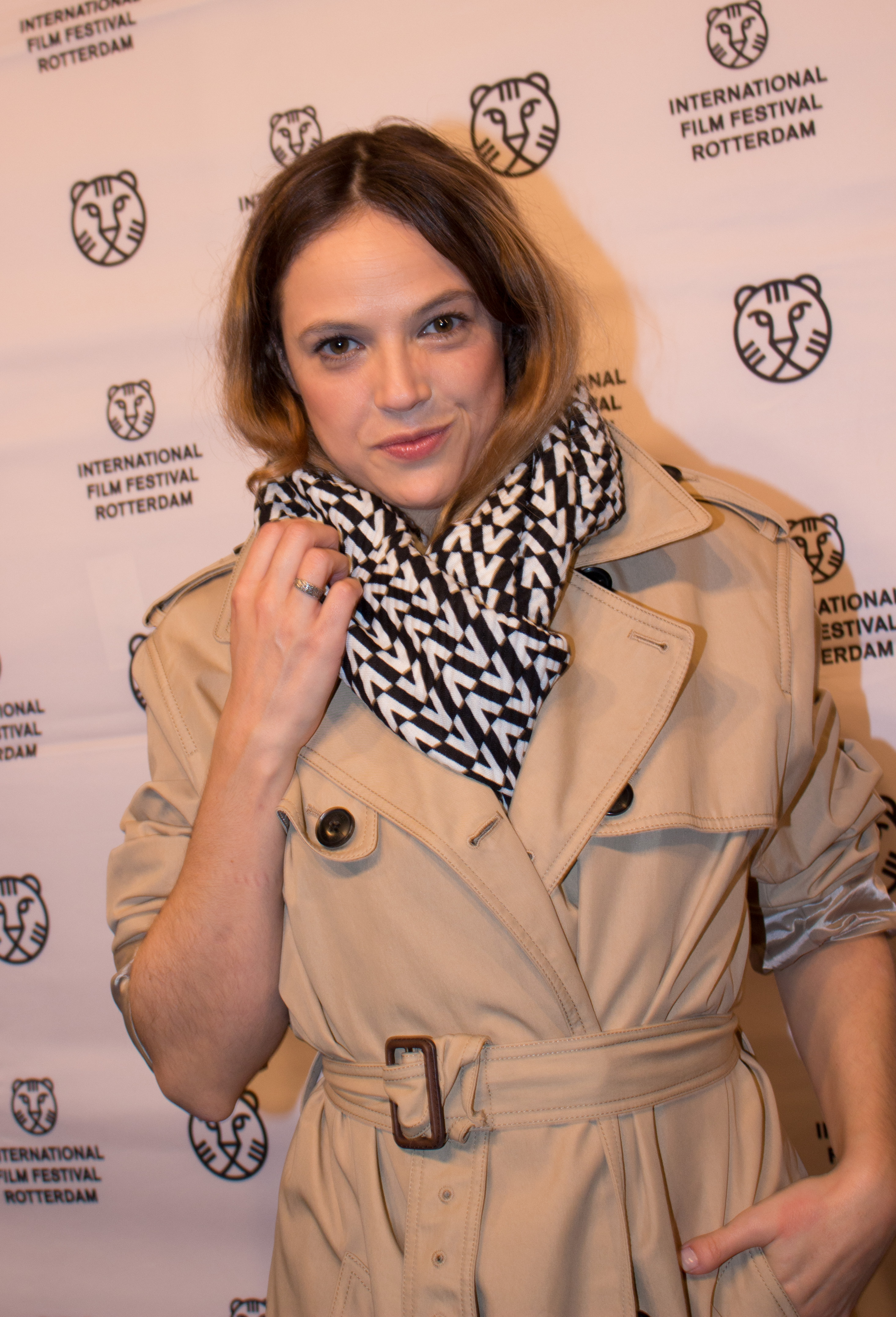
- Catarina Wallenstein at the International Film Festival Rotterdam 2020
- Born: Catarina de Lemos Wallenstein; 23 August 1986 (age 39); London, England
- Occupation: Actress
- Years active: 2004–present

Catarina de Lemos Wallenstein (born 23 August 1986) is a Portuguese actress. She has appeared in more than twenty films since 2004.

== Biography ==
Wallenstein was born in London, daughter of Pedro Franco Wallenstein Teixeira, double bass player of the Portuguese Symphonic Orchestra, and Lúcia de Castro Cardoso de Lemos, a lyric singer. Her family settled in Lisbon when she was still a child. On the paternal side, she is the granddaughter of the poet and actor Carlos Wallenstein and the actress, teacher and director Maria Wallenstein and niece of the actor José Wallenstein. She studied at the Lisbon Theatre and Film School.

She joined the choir of the Children's Music Foundation, where she also studied cello and choral singing. The same foundation led her to participate in the children's ensembles of operas such as Tosca, La Bohème, Carmen, in the National Theatre of Saint Charles.

In 2009, she appeared in Eccentricities of a Blonde-Haired Girl, a film directed by Manoel de Oliveira. She won a Portuguese Golden Globe for her performance. She took a regular role in the soap opera Santa Bárbara in 2015.

== Selected filmography ==
Film
Year	Title	Role	Notes
2017	Peregrinação		
2009	Eccentricities of a Blonde-Haired Girl		
2008	Doomed Love		
2018	Les Unwanted de Europa	Lisa Fittko	

TV
Year	Title	Role	Notes
2010	Destino Imortal	Sofia Wagner	Protagonist
2015	Santa Bárbara	Júlia Montemor	Secondary

== Awards and nominations ==
Year	Award	Category	Work	Result
2009	Portuguese Golden Globes	Best Actress	Lobos	Nominated
2010	Portuguese Golden Globes	Best Actress	Eccentricities of a Blonde-Haired Girl	Won
