= The Lovebirds (2007 film) =

2007 USA-Portugal film production

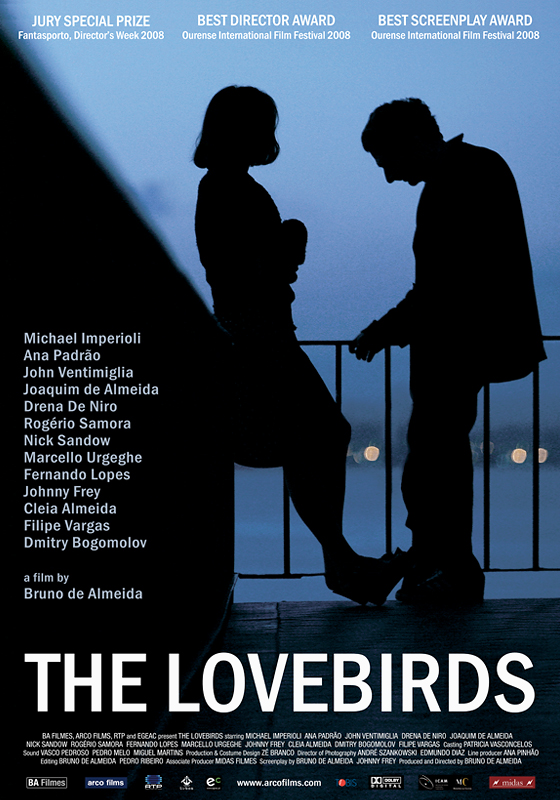
- Directed by: Bruno de Almeida
- Screenplay by: Bruno de Almeida; John Frey
- Produced by: Bruno de Almeida
- Starring: Michael Imperioli; Ana Padrão; John Ventimiglia; Joaquim de Almeida; Drena De Niro; Rogério Samora; Nick Sandow; Marcello Urgeghe; Fernando Lopes; John Frey; Cleia Almeida; Filipe Vargas; Dmitry Bogomolov
- Cinematography: André Szankowski
- Edited by: Bruno de Almeida; Pedro Ribeiro
- Release date: 18 June 2007
- Running time: 83 minutes
- Countries: Portugal; United States
- Languages: English; Portuguese

The Lovebirds is a 2007 Portuguese feature drama film directed by Bruno de Almeida, starring Michael Imperioli, John Ventimiglia, Joaquim de Almeida, Drena De Niro, Nick Sandow and Rogério Samora.

== Synopsis ==
The Lovebirds intertwines six stories in the course of one night in Lisbon. An artist pursues a girl through the old cobblestone streets bewitched by the resemblance she has to his dead wife; two small-time crooks break into an apartment as they argue about a lover that tries to divide them; an aging director shooting a boxing film struggles with a movie star and a boxer who has too much pride to be knocked out; an alienated taxi driver brutally kills a prostitute but when he picks up a pregnant woman he may unexpectedly find redemption; a pilot's weekend affair with a fashion designer goes haywire when her overprotective dog exposes certain trivialities in their relationship; an archaeologist refuses to come out of a work pit where his obsessions may be a cover up for something deeper. A mix of lovable off-beat characters dealing with love, friendship, passion, solitude and hope.

== Cast ==
- Michael Imperioli as Vincent
- Ana Padrão as Rosa
- John Ventimiglia as John Constantin
- Joaquim de Almeida as Marco Correia
- Drena De Niro as Stella Clark
- Rogério Samora as Vitor
- Fernando Lopes as The Director
- Nick Sandow as Lenny
- Marcello Urghege as Romeo
- John Frey as Oscar
- Cleia Almeida as Sandra
- Dmitry Bogomolov as Drago
- Suzie Peterson as Vera
- Ivo Canelas as Pedro
- Filipe Vargas as Miguel

== Awards ==
- Jury Special Prize Fantasporto Film festival, Director's week, Oporto Portugal 2008
- Best Director Award Ourense International Film Festival, Ourense Spain 2008
- Best Screenplay Award Ourense International Film Festival, Ourense Spain 2008
