= Lisa Fittko =

Hungarian resistance fighter (1909–2005)

Lisa Fittko in 1942

Lisa Fittko (born Elizabeth Eckstein, Hungarian: Eckstein (Ekstein) Erzsébet; 1909 – March 12, 2005) helped many escape from Nazi-occupied France during World War II. The author of two memoirs about wartime Europe, Fittko is also known for her assisting German philosopher and critic Walter Benjamin in getting out of France to escape the Nazis in 1940.

== Biography ==
Lisa Fittko was born into an international Jewish family (Simon, Ekstein) in 1909 in Uzhhorod, Ung County, Kingdom of Hungary. Her large family was active in many spheres of cultural and economic life of the Austro-Hungarian Empire. One branch of her family was active in the Czech national movement, others were prominent industrialists and patrons of the arts. Johann Strauss II, the "Waltz King" was an in-law. She grew up in the company of her aunt Malva Schalek.

After her family moved to Berlin, she witnessed the Nazi rise to power, and became involved in anti-fascist politics. She worked as an underground resistance fighter in Berlin, Prague (where she met her husband and comrade Hans Fittko), Zurich, Amsterdam, Paris, Marseilles and finally, in the Pyrenees where from 1940 to 1941, she escorted refugees into Spain. In Banyuls-sur-Mer she was asked by the Socialist mayor, Azéma to assist émigrés in crossing the border, and in creating a network of information so that the "new route would be known by those who came after".

Fittko was an émigré herself wanting to get to Portugal, to be able to take a boat to escape to the U.S. but she remained in Banyuls-sur-Mer to participate in Varian Fry's "border project" (Emergency Rescue Committee) and help many others. Her route became the "new route" and the alternative to the fascist controlled coastal path from Cerbere to Portbou. This same route was called the Lister Route in 1939 (named after the Spanish Republican general who led his troops out of Spain at the end of the Spanish Civil War) and then later, in 1940 it was coined the F-Route by Fry.

Perhaps the best-known refugee she was able to help was Walter Benjamin, who reached Portbou, Spain, on September 25, 1940. She took Benjamin into Spain following verbal instructions, and a small drawing of the route that mayor Azéma had drawn for her. This was the first of her many walks over the Pyrenees. Benjamin was found dead in the small hotel in the border town of Port-Bou, where they had arrived on the morning after the Spanish police threatened to turn the small group of émigrés he was with back to occupied France. After Benjamin's death, the rest of his group was subsequently allowed to proceed. According to Fittko, Benjamin carried with him a heavy briefcase which he claimed to be more important than his life. This story was not confirmed by other accounts, causing some controversy. Authorities such as Chimen Abramsky, who was among the first to hear the story and from Fittko herself, give Fittko's account credibility. A briefcase was mentioned in the Spanish police records, but its contents mention only "newspapers and various other papers of unimportant content". Speculations as to its contents have been the subject of scholarly articles and artistic works inspired by Benjamin's story and Lisa Fittko's account of it in her books.

With her husband Hans, she escaped to Cuba, and from there entered the United States. She came to international recognition over forty years later through her two widely translated memoirs, in which she describes her actions.

Hedi Stadlen was her second cousin and the former's son, Sir Nicholas Stadlen, was Fittko's second cousin once removed.

She died in Chicago at the age of 95 on March 12, 2005.

== Selected works ==
- Lisa Fittko, Escape through the Pyrenees, Northwestern University Press, ISBN 0-8101-1803-3.
- Lisa Fittko, Solidarity and Treason: Resistance and Exile, 1933-1940, translated by Roselyn Theobald in collaboration with the author Evanston, Illinois, Northwestern University Press, 1993

== Films ==
- Les Unwanted de Europa, Directed by Fabrizio Ferraro, Lisa Fittko played by Catarina Wallenstein, 2018.
- Transatlantic, TV series, Lisa Fittko played by Deleila Piasko, 2023.
