= Hedi Stadlen =

Austrian Jewish philosopher, political activist, and musicologist

- Born: Hedwig Magdalena Simon; 6 January 1916; Vienna
- Died: 21 January 2004 (aged 88)
- Education: Newnham College, Cambridge
- Occupation: Teacher at Ceylon University College
- Notable work: "Under Nazi Rule"
- Political party: Communist Party of Great Britain (CPGB). United Socialist Party (USP)
- Spouse(s): Pieter Keuneman; Peter Stadlen
- Children: Sir Nicholas Stadlen
- Parents: Hans Simon (father); Else Reis (mother)
- Relatives: Malva Schalek (first cousin once removed); Julius Epstein (second cousin); Lisa Fittko (second cousin); Johann Strauss II (great-uncle)

Hedi Stadlen (6 January 1916 – 21 January 2004), better known in Sri Lanka as Hedi Keuneman, was an Austrian Jewish philosopher, political activist, and musicologist. She was one of a handful of European Radicals in Sri Lanka.

== Vienna ==
She was born Hedwig Magdalena Simon in Vienna to Else Reis and Hans Simon, an eminent economist and banker. She was one of those whose life was deeply affected by the spread of virulent fascism in Europe in the 1930s. Both her parents were assimilated, non-observant Jews; her father had Hedi baptised to make sure that she would have protection from antisemitic shopkeepers during the starvation caused by the First World War.

She was sent to a progressive school in Vienna founded by the Polish-Jewish feminist Eugenia Schwarzwald, at whose home Hedi met such figures as the painter Oskar Kokoschka and the architect Adolph Loos.

She studied philosophy at the University of Vienna. One of her lecturers, Professor Moritz Schlick was shot by a deranged student. The student was later paroled, acclaimed as a 'heroic Aryan' and, became a member of the Austrian Nazi party after the Anschluss.

Incidents such as this caused Dr. Simon to leave Vienna and take his family to Switzerland and later to the USA.

== Cambridge ==
Through contacts in Whitehall, Dr Simon sent his daughter to Newnham College, Cambridge, where she continued her studies, but switched to Moral Sciences (philosophy) under Ludwig Wittgenstein.

She spent her weekends in London, working for the cause of Indian freedom in Krishna Menon's India League, with Indira Gandhi among others. She later explained that "the racial discrimination suffered by the Jews in Austria made me feel sympathetic to the victims of colonial rule and strengthened my determination to identify with the fight for the freedom and independence of colonial peoples."

The capitalist crisis, fascism and the Spanish Civil War attracted her to the Communist Party of Great Britain. The historian Eric Hobsbawm fell in love with Hedi Simon, but she, in turn fell in love with another communist undergraduate, Pieter Keuneman, who was President of the Cambridge Union and editor of the student magazine Granta. He was the son of a Dutch Burgher Supreme Court justice in Ceylon.

Hedi Simon graduated with first class honours in 1939, but as a woman was excluded under university rules from the award of her degree. She married Pieter Keuneman in Switzerland in September 1939. The next year they went to Ceylon.

== Colombo ==
In Ceylon, the left had split in 1940, when the Trotskyists in the Lanka Sama Samaja Party expelled the pro-Moscow faction, which formed the United Socialist Party (USP). The Keunemans joined the USP, which was fiercely anti-colonial until the invasion by Hitler of the Soviet Union, thereafter advocating co-operation with the colonial regime against the common enemy, fascism.

Hedi Keuneman was elected president of one of the co-operative societies were formed to distribute affordable food, following the outbreak of war. She monitored food stocks and prices in central Colombo, popularising cheaper, local food cereals such as bajiri, a locally grown sticky grain, earning herself the nickname bajiri nona ('bajiri lady').

Between 1940 and 1942, Hedi Keuneman taught at University College, Colombo and at the Modern School initiated by another communist emigrant and India League veteran, Doreen Young Wickremasinghe.

She was active in the Friends of the Soviet Union and, with shoulder-length black hair and sometimes barefoot in a red sari, distributed pro-communist literature and addressed meetings among English-speaking supporters. She also wrote a pamphlet publicising Hitler's tyranny, Under Nazi Rule.

In 1943 when the USP was dissolved and became the Communist Party of Ceylon, Pieter became its first general secretary. He and Hedi subsisted on boiled breadfruit and sambol, living modestly near the CP office in Borella.

== London ==
Following end of the war in 1945, Hedi Keuneman returned to Europe to meet her mother—as a communist, she was barred from entering the United States (where her father had died in 1942). In London in 1946 she met an old friend from Vienna, Peter Stadlen a distinguished concert pianist who had premiered the Webern Opus 27 Variations. She chose not to return to Ceylon, and divorced Pieter. While Hedi Stadlen never rejoined a communist party, she never renounced her socialist convictions.

She subsequently married Stadlen, with whom she lived in Hampstead. In 1956, a hand injury obliged Stadlen to turn to music criticism, chiefly for The Daily Telegraph, and academic study. Hedi collaborated with him, possibly influenced by her musical heritage, as grandniece of Johann Strauss. They produced conclusive evidence that extensive sections of Anton Schindler's Beethoven conversation books were forgeries. She also played a crucial role in Stadlen's study of Beethoven's intentions with his metronome markings.

On Stadlen's death on 20 January 1996, Hedi lied about her age and joined the charity Volunteer Reading Help, and for six years helped disadvantaged children in a North London primary school to strengthen their reading. She also worked with Annette Morreau on a biography of the Viennese cellist Emmanuel Feuermann.

In 2002 she returned to Cambridge to receive the degree denied to her over five decades previously. At the same ceremony her son Nicholas received his M.A. and her grandson, Matthew, was awarded his B.A.

Hedi Stadlen was survived by her sons Nicholas, a High Court judge (who holds the record for the longest speech in British legal history—119 days), and Godfrey, a senior civil servant in the Home Office.

== See also ==
- List of Austrians in music
- Women in musicology
