= Virados do Avesso =

- Film poster
- Directed by: Edgar Pêra
- Starring: Diogo Morgado; Nicolau Breyner; Rui Unas
- Production company: Cine Cool
- Distributed by: NOS Lusomundo Audiovisuais
- Release date: 27 November 2014
- Running time: 96 minutes
- Country: Portugal
- Language: Portuguese
- Box office: €573,149.88

Virados do Avesso is a 2014 Portuguese comedy film directed by Edgar Pêra. It was released on 27 November 2014.

== Cast ==
- Diogo Morgado
- Nicolau Breyner
- Rui Unas
- Nuno Melo
- Rui Melo

== Reception ==
As of 11 January 2015, it was the second highest-grossing Portuguese film of 2014 at the Portuguese box office, with €550,441.04, and also the second with most admissions, with 106,736. Also, as of 14 January 2015, it was the 10th highest-grossing Portuguese film at the Portuguese box office since 2004, with €573,149.88, and the 11th with most admissions, with 111,144.

On Público, Jorge Mourinha gave the film a grade of "mediocre".
