= Diahnne Abbott =

American actress (born 1945)

- Born: May 1, 1945 (age 81)
- Other name: Diahnne Déa
- Occupation: Actress
- Years active: 1976–present
- Spouse: Robert De Niro (m. 1976; div. 1988)
- Children: Drena; Raphael
- Relatives: Gregory Abbott (cousin)

Diahnne Abbott (born May 1, 1945) is an American actress.

== Personal life ==
Abbott married actor Robert De Niro in 1976. That same year, they had a son, Raphael, who was named after the hotel in Rome where he was conceived. De Niro adopted Drena, Abbott's daughter from a previous relationship. De Niro and Abbott divorced in 1988.

== Career ==
Abbott portrayed the pornographic movie theatre concession clerk in Martin Scorsese's Taxi Driver (1976) opposite De Niro. She has a memorable cameo in the 1977 film New York, New York, in which she sings Fats Waller's song, "Honeysuckle Rose".

She also played the object of De Niro's affections in Scorsese's 1982 film, The King of Comedy, as well as roles in the television series Crime Story (the character of Sonia) and the 1986 film Jo Jo Dancer, Your Life Is Calling (Mother). She is the cousin of singer Gregory Abbott, known for his 1986 song "Shake You Down".

== Filmography ==
=== Film ===
Year	Title	Role	Notes
1976	Taxi Driver	Concession Girl	
1976	Welcome to L.A.	Jeanette Ross	
1977	New York, New York	Harlem Club Singer	
1982	The King of Comedy	Rita Keane	
1984	Love Streams	Susan	
1986	Jo Jo Dancer, Your Life Is Calling	Mother	
2000	Before Night Falls	Blanca Romero	
2002	Soliloquy	Leah	

=== Television ===
Year	Title	Role	Notes
1988	Crime Story	Sonia	Three episodes
