= List of highest-grossing Portuguese films =

The following is a list of highest-grossing Portuguese films at the Portuguese box office. It only includes films released since 2004.

== List ==
The following are the films with the most admissions in Portugal since 2004 as of 15 Nov 2026

Background colour indicates films currently in cinemas.

Rank	Title	Year	Admissions	Gross
1	The Gilded Cage	2013	761,113	€3,892,220.88
2	O Pátio das Cantigas	2015	608,376	€3,100,136.47
3	O Crime do Padre Amaro	2005	380,671	€1,643,842.88
4	7 Pecados Rurais	2013	324,174	€1,676,941.20
5	Curral de Moinas - Os Banqueiros do Povo	2022	316,626	€1,784,810.74
6	Variações	2019	279,510	€1,491,310.54
7	Filme da Treta	2006	278,956	€1,092,404.73
8	Balas & Bolinhos - O Último Capítulo	2012	256,179	€1,298,127.98
9	Balas & Bolinhos: Só Mais uma Coisa	2024	248,950	€1,569,648.18
10	Santo António - O Casamenteiro de Lisboa	2026	242,578	€1,662,439.18
11	Morangos Com Açúcar - O Filme	2012	238,323	€1,233,020.50
12	Call Girl	2007	232,581	€1,034,687.00
13	Corrupção	2007	230,741	€1,010,974.84
14	Amália - O Filme	2008	214,740	€929,680.74
15	O Leão da Estrela	2015	198,966	€1,014,754.24
16	A Canção de Lisboa	2016	188,289	€946,066.80
17	Uma Aventura na Casa Assombrada	2009	124,938	€558,477.96
18	Os Maias	2014	123,085	€599,505.29
19	Pôr do Sol: O Mistério do Colar de São Cajó	2023	118,721	€693,291.63
20	Virados do Avesso	2014	113,245	€580,017.25
21	Podia Ter Esperado por Agosto	2024	104,151	€637,854.97
22	A Bela e o Paparazzo	2010	99,117	€435,415.19
23	Os Gatos não Têm Vertigens	2014	94,676	€478,401.29
24	Second Life	2009	90,194	€403,962.49
25	Bem Bom	2021	89,232	€483,905.66
26	Contraluz	2010	83,724	€378,809.36
27	SNU	2019	83,210	€438,350.70
28	O Fim da Inocência	2017	81,993	€439,713.50
29	The Domain	2019	74,885	€387,491.03
30	Sorte Nula	2004	74,095	€305,951.83
31	O Pátio da Saudade	2025	70,137	€447,925.64
32	Sei Lá	2014	61,730	€315,425.90
33	O Sonho de uma Noite de São João	2005	58,919	€233,897.88
34	Night Train to Lisbon	2013	58,903	€306,162.69
