= Marco d'Almeida =

Mozambique-born Portuguese actor

- Born: 27 April 1975 (age 50); Mozambique
- Occupation: Actor

Marco d'Almeida is a Mozambique-born Portuguese actor born on April 27, 1975. He was the male star in Beauty and the Paparazzo, the highest-grossing Portuguese film in 2010.
