= Scott Bailey (actor) =

American actor

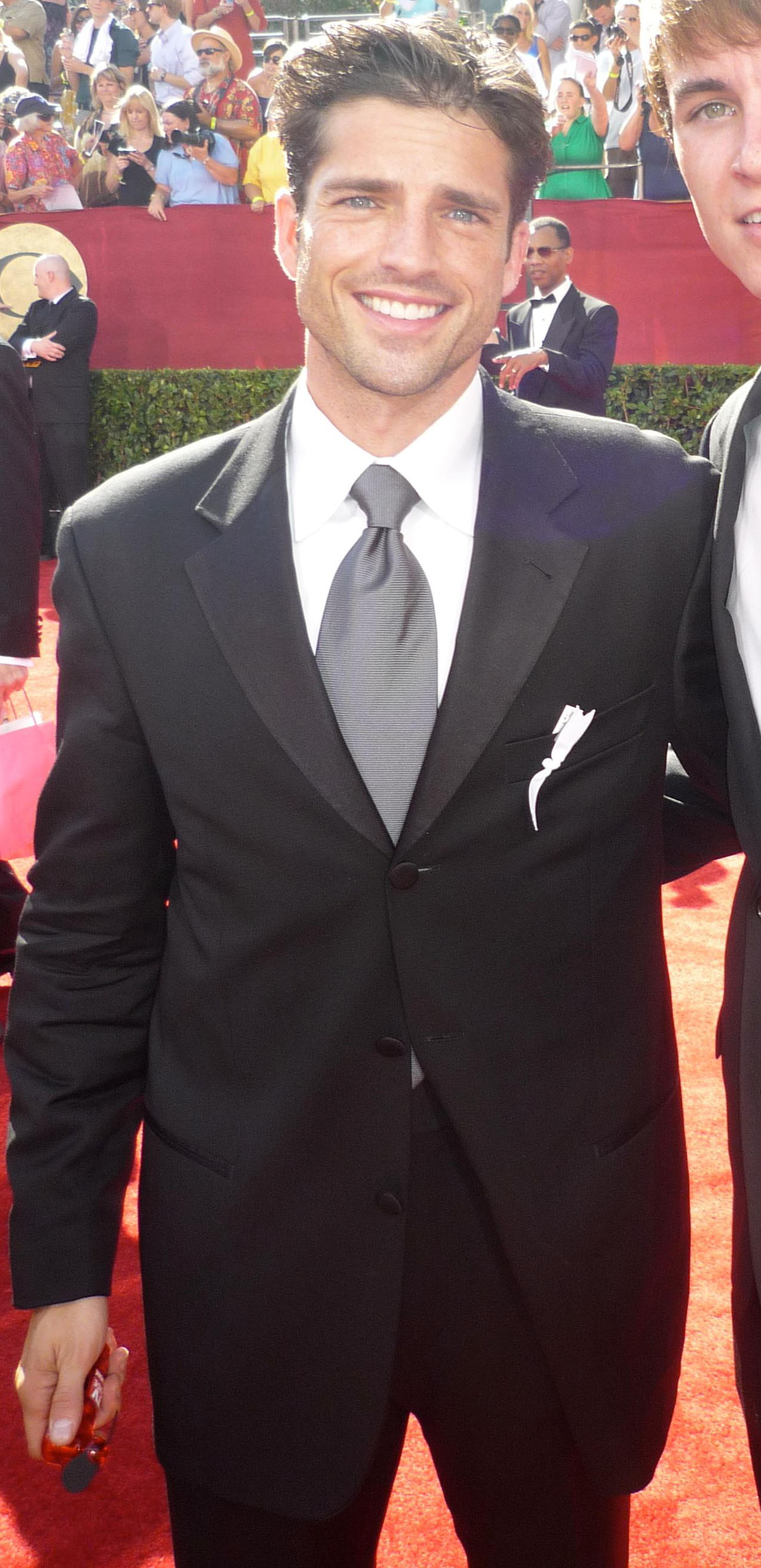
- Born: Scott Bailey; Florissant, Missouri, U.S.
- Years active: 1999–present
- Spouse: Adrienne Frantz (2011–present)
- Children: 3

Scott Bailey is an American actor. He is known for playing the character of Sandy Foster on the CBS soap opera Guiding Light, the character of Roman Martin on the MyNetworkTV limited-run serial Saints & Sinners and the character of Greg Cooper in an episode of the TV series Femme Fatales.

== Background ==
Bailey was born in Florissant, Missouri. He spent seven years of his childhood residing in Europe. Due to having lived in Europe, Bailey is fluent in German and Spanish (and sign language). He has an elder sister, Lisa, and his mother worked as an Army nurse for the Government. He earned a degree in mechanical engineering from New Mexico State University, where he was a member of the Pi Kappa Alpha fraternity and was an ASNMSU (Associated Students of New Mexico State University) senator. Bailey has also worked for the U.S. Department of Energy. Acting was not Scott Bailey's first choice of occupation; it was merely just a hobby. He eventually decided to pursue a career in acting while working on his doctoral degree at UCLA.

== Career ==
Bailey started on Guiding Light in August 2003 as Sandy Foster and his radio's alter ego, "The Mole", and played the part until March 2006, when he chose not to renew his contract and his character was killed off. He also made a brief appearance on an MTV comedy and drama series Undressed, where he played Stan during the show's third season. He most recently played two roles the CW4Kids series Kamen Rider Dragon Knight; James Trademore a.k.a. JTC, a human villain, and his heroic Ventaran double Price. Both were able to transform into Kamen Rider Strike. He also appeared in a television movie in 2001 called Just Ask My Children. As well as that, Bailey also starred in an episode of the American television series Chicken Soup for the Soul as the character of Mac’. In 2012, Bailey won a Best Supporting Actor award at the Hollywood Reel Independent Film Festival for the character of Kyle in the film Bank Roll.

In 2006, after the completion of his role as Sandy Foster in Guiding Light, Scott Bailey made a guest appearance on Law & Order: Special Victims Unit in 2006. While being a soap opera actor, Bailey also worked in the film industry with Universal Studios on several action shows including Terminator 2: 3D and Spider-Man. He also starred in several other theatre productions in which he played the lead role including: The Problem, Zoo Story and Key Exchange. In January 2009 Bailey starred in the film Prayers for Bobby alongside co-star Ryan Kelley.

In 2009, Scott Bailey featured in Old Spice commercials as a Centaur. This piece attracted a lot of attention towards Bailey since his performance as a gay character in the 2009 movie Prayers for Bobby.

In 2011 Scott Bailey guest starred as the character Greg Cooper in an episode of the TV series Femme Fatales.

Alongside acting Bailey has also done voice overs for commercials, TV narrations and Documentary narrations. In the past Bailey has represented DPN (Danis, Panaro, Nist) Talent Agency as a Voice Over Artist. Bailey also made an appearance for the Covergirl Magazine promotional tour. Behind the camera Scott Bailey has worked with a number of charities as well as hosting several of their charity events. His other hosting positions include segments of home improvement shows, science and engineering shows and environmental segments.

== Personal life ==
In January 2010 it was announced that Bailey was engaged to Adrienne Frantz. The two married on November 11, 2011 in California. They have three children: a daughter, Amélie, born December 1, 2015, and sons Lion, born June 19, 2020 and Killian, born in March 2022.

== Filmography ==
- Walker Texas Ranger as Danny (1999)
- Just Ask My Children (2001)
- Guiding Light as Sandy Foster (2003–2006)
- Saints & Sinners as Roman Martin (2007)
- Prayers for Bobby as David (2009)
- Kamen Rider: Dragon Knight as JTC, Price/Kamen Rider Strike (2009)
- Backlight as Matt (2010)
- Femme Fatales as Greg Cooper (2011)
- The Perfect Girlfriend as Trevor, (2015)
- Dispatch (2016)
- Home by Spring (2018)
- Maternal Instinct as Jonathan (2019)
- From Zero to I Love You (2019)
