= Joyce Pensato =

American painter (1941–2019)

- Pensato in 2016
- Born: August 20, 1941; Brooklyn, New York, US
- Died: June 13, 2019 (aged 77); Manhattan, New York, US
- Education: Art Students League of New York, New York Studio School
- Known for: Painting

Joyce Marie Pensato (August 20, 1941 – June 23, 2019) was an American painter. Born in Brooklyn, New York, she studied at the Art Students League of New York and the New York Studio School. Pensato was known for her painted interpretations of pop culture and cartoon characters such as Batman, Mickey Mouse, Felix the Cat and Homer Simpson.

Pensato was the recipient of a Guggenheim Fellowship, the Anonymous Was A Woman Award and the Robert De Niro Sr. Prize. Her work is included in the collections of the Whitney Museum of American Art, the Museum of Modern Art in New York, the Centre Pompidou, the Hammer Museum in Los Angeles and the San Francisco Museum of Modern Art.

Pensato died in Manhattan on June 13, 2019, after complications with pancreatic cancer.
