= Raphael De Niro =

American real estate broker (born 1976)

- Born: Raphael Eugene De Niro; November 9, 1976 (age 50); Los Angeles, California, U.S.
- Occupation: Real estate broker
- Years active: 1980–2013 (actor); 2003–present (real estate broker)
- Spouses: Claudine DeMatos (m. 2008; div. 2020) Hannah Carnes (m. 2020)
- Children: 3
- Parents: Robert De Niro (father); Diahnne Abbott (mother)
- Relatives: Drena De Niro (half sister); Virginia Admiral (grandmother); Robert De Niro Sr. (grandfather)

Raphael Eugene De Niro (born November 9, 1976) is an American real estate broker and former actor. He often works with celebrity clients, including Jon Bon Jovi, Renée Zellweger, Travis Kalanick and Kelly Ripa. De Niro is the son of actor Robert De Niro and actress Diahnne Abbott. He has also appeared in several films: Love Streams (1984); West 4th (2007); James Abbott is Gone (2013); Raging Bull (1980); and Awakenings (1990). De Niro is a licensed associate real estate broker at Brown Harris Stevens, which he joined in early 2026 after departing Douglas Elliman. He was ranked first in The Real Deal's Manhattan top residential agents in 2017.

== Early life and education ==
De Niro was born on November 9, 1976, in Los Angeles, but grew up in New York City. He worked at various summer jobs growing up, including in a Persian rug store, as a doorman, a production assistant on movie sets for his father, and as a busboy at his father’s restaurant, Nobu. He attended New York University but did not graduate.

== Career ==
=== Acting ===
He appeared in films which also starred his father, including Awakenings and Raging Bull. He produced James Abbott is Gone (2013), the documentary West 4th (2007), and appeared in Love Streams (1984).

=== Real estate ===
Partly because De Niro's grandmother Virginia Admiral invested in real estate, participating in some of SoHo's first warehouse-to-residential conversions in the 1960s and 1970s, and later his father's involvement, he decided in 2003 to get a real estate broker's license. During his first six years in real estate, De Niro sold a total of $600 million in properties, becoming one of the top ten sellers each year at Douglas Elliman. He is the head of the "De Niro Team", which is ranked as a top-producing sales team in New York City and in the U.S. He is a partner with his father Robert De Niro in a five-star boutique hotel in Tribeca, the Greenwich Hotel, launched in 2008. In 2015, De Niro made headlines, along with fellow Elliman broker Sabrina Saltiel, for holding the listing for New York City's most expensive listing at the time; a trio of townhouses on East 42nd Street, listed as a package for $120 million.

De Niro is a member of the board of directors of the Tribeca Film Institute.

== Personal life ==
De Niro married Claudine DeMatos in March 2008. They separated in 2015 and their divorce was finalized in January 2020. They have three children together. De Niro married fashion stylist Hannah Carnes in March 2020.
