= Ricardo Viegas =

Portuguese footballer

Personal information
- Full name: Ricardo Alexandre de Almeida Viegas
- Date of birth: 1 May 1992 (age 34)
- Place of birth: Lisbon, Portugal
- Height: 1.77 m (5 ft 10 in)
- Position: Forward

Team information
- Current team: Os Belenenses

Youth career
- 2001–2007: Benfica
- 2008–2011: Belenenses

Senior career*
Years	Team	Apps	(Gls)
2011–2012	Belenenses	6	(0)
2012–2013	Mafra	14	(2)
2013–2014	Torreense	31	(4)
2014–2015	União Montemor	27	(5)
2015–2016	Atlético Malveira	13	(0)
2016–2017	Casa Pia	7	(0)
2017–2018	Pêro Pinheiro	10	(2)
2018–	Os Belenenses	29	(22)
- * Club domestic league appearances and goals as of 1 August 2021

Ricardo Alexandre de Almeida Viegas (born 1 May 1992) is a Portuguese footballer who plays for Os Belenenses as a forward.

== Career ==
In 2008, aged 16, Viegas joined Belenenses' youth system. He was promoted to the first team for 2011–12, with the Lisbon side in the second division.

Viegas made his official debut with the main squad on 31 July 2011, playing 22 minutes in a 0–0 away draw against Penafiel for the season's Portuguese League Cup.
