= Drena De Niro =

American actress (born 1967)

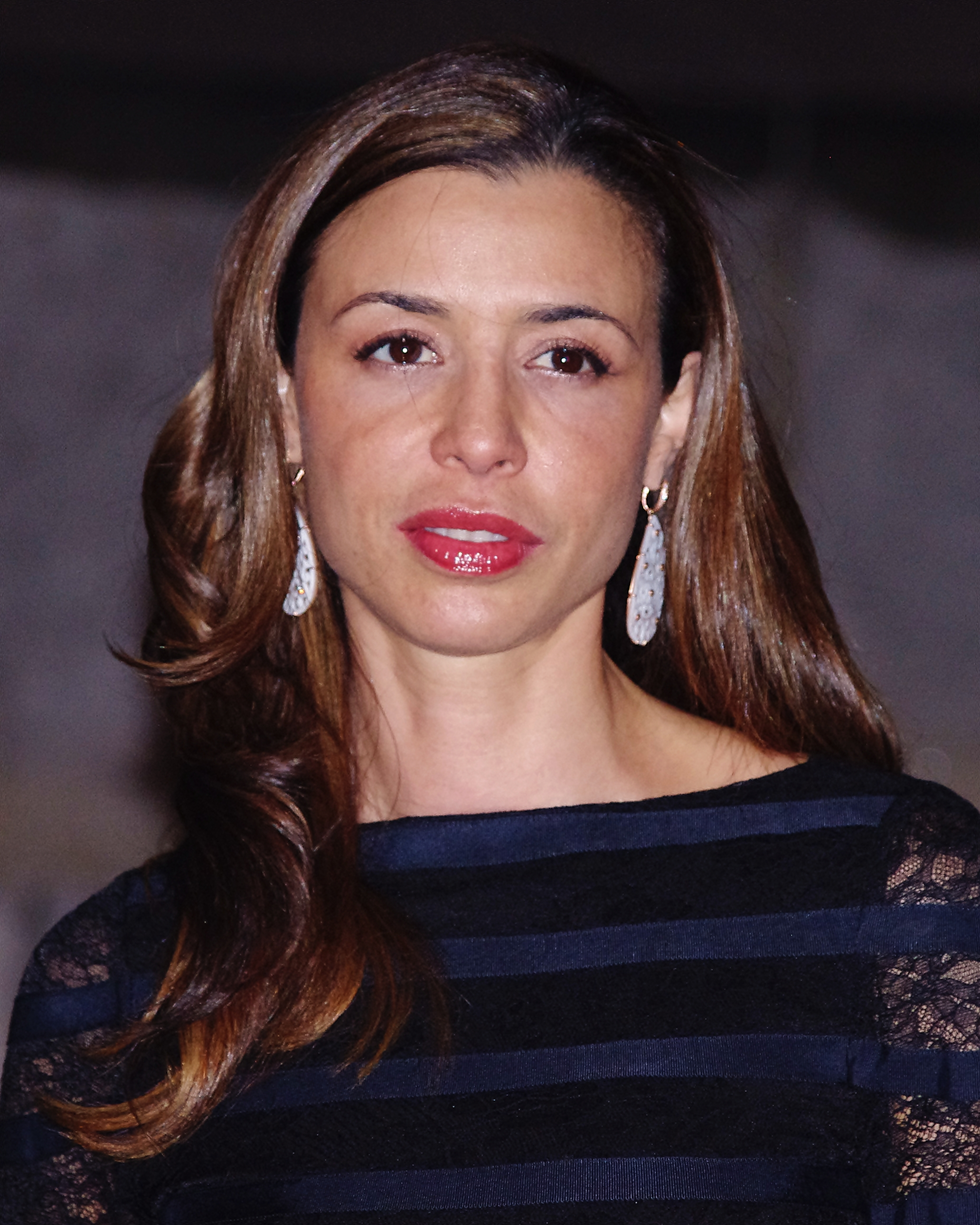
- De Niro at the 2012 Tribeca Film Festival Vanity Fair party
- Born: September 3, 1970 (age 56); New York City, U.S.
- Occupation: Actress
- Years active: 1996–present
- Children: 1 (deceased)
- Parent(s): Robert De Niro (adoptive father); Diahnne Abbott (mother)
- Relatives: Raphael De Niro (half brother); Virginia Admiral (adoptive grandmother); Robert De Niro Sr. (adoptive grandfather)

Drena De Niro (born September 3, 1970) is an American actress and filmmaker who is the daughter of Diahnne Abbott and the adoptive daughter of Robert De Niro after their marriage in 1976.

== Life and career ==
De Niro is the daughter of actress Diahnne Abbott, and the daughter of actor Robert De Niro, whose last name she took upon her mother's marriage to him in 1976.

De Niro had a bohemian upbringing and divided her time living in New York City, Los Angeles, and Italy. The transient lifestyle is said to have been a factor in her choice to work in the arts. After high school she began her career in the entertainment industry working as a model. Having interests in fashion and music she became a DJ and fashion consultant. It led to working as a musical supervisor for Giorgio Armani creating and coordinating runway shows.

Her transition to the field of acting began with her role in Allison Anders' Grace of My Heart. Since then De Niro has worked with and trained under Larry Moss, author of the acting guide, Intent to Live, and Susan Batson of The Black Nexxus Acting Studio. After 2000 De Niro wrote and directed her first film, Girls and Dolls. The documentary examined a young stylist's obsession with her dolls, and she won the Best Directorial Debut Award at the New York Independent Film/Video Festival in 2001. She has appeared in several of her father's films, including Showtime (2002), Wag the Dog (1997), City by the Sea (2002) and The Intern (2015).

Recently De Niro's endeavors have led her back to Italy, where she worked on her latest film. Since 2006, she has been the spokesperson for the Kageno Orphan Sponsorship Program, which helps provide care for orphaned children in Kageno villages. De Niro currently lives in New York City. In July 2023, De Niro announced that her son Leandro had died aged 19. It was later revealed to be due to accidental fentanyl poisoning.

== Filmography ==
=== Film ===
Year	Title	Role	Notes
1996	Grace of My Heart	Receptionist #1	
1997	Wag the Dog	Gate Stewardess	
1998	Too Tired to Die	Waitress	
1998	Great Expectations	Marcy	
1999	At First Sight	Caroline	
1999	On the Run	Rita	
1999	The 24 Hour Woman	Lori	
1999	Personals	Sherie	
1999	Entropy	Waitress	
2000	The Adventures of Rocky and Bullwinkle	RBTV Lackey	
2001	Freewheeling in Roma	Keechie	
2002	Showtime	Annie	
2002	Ghetto Dawg	Semi	
2002	City by the Sea	Vanessa Hansen	
2002	Soliloquy	Kara	
2003	Death of a Dynasty	Female Staff Writer	
2005	Freezerburn	Nada, The Handler	
2005	The Collection	Various	
2007	The Lovebirds	Stella Clark	
2009	Karma, Confessions and Holi	Megan	
2009	ExTerminators	Dr. Press	
2009	A Day in the Life	'P'	
2011	New Year's Eve	Ahern Waitress – Ahern Party	
2014	Welcome to New York	Executive Assistant	
2015	The Intern	Hotel Manager	
2015	Joy	Cindy	
2016	Hands of Stone	Adele	
2018	Furlough	Linda	
2018	A Star Is Born	Paulette Stone	

=== Television ===
Year	Title	Role	Notes
1998	Witness to the Mob	Girl In Beauty Shop	
2002	The Groovenians	Glindy (voice)	TV short
2012	NYC 22	SVU Detective Irma Bolland	Episode: "Block Party"
