= Malva Schalek =

Czech-Jewish painter

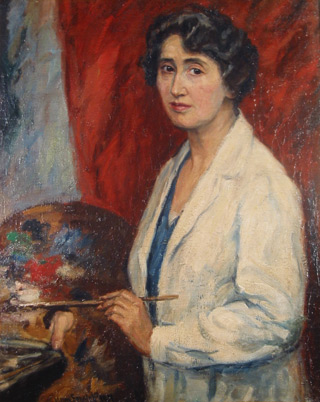
- Self-portrait
- Born: Malvina Schalková; 18 February 1882; Prague, Czechoslovakia
- Died: 24 May 1944 (aged 62); Auschwitz-Birkenau, German-occupied Poland
- Known for: Painting
- Family: Lisa Fittko (niece); Hedi Stadlen (first cousin once removed); Sir Nicholas Stadlen (first cousin twice removed)

Malva Schalek, aka Malvina Schalková (18 February 1882 – 24 May 1944 or 24 March 1945), was a Czech-Jewish painter. Trained in Prague, she went on to work in Vienna as a painter. From 1942 to 1944 she was imprisoned in the Theresienstadt concentration camp. In 1944 she was moved to the Auschwitz concentration camp, where she was murdered. Many of her works are held in the Ghetto Fighters' House in Israel.

== Life ==
Malva Schalek was born in Prague to a German-speaking Jewish intellectual family active in the Czech national movement. She went to school in Prague, Vrchlabi (Hohenelbe), and studied art, first at the Frauenakademie in Munich and then privately in Vienna. She earned her living as a painter in Vienna, in her studio above the Theater an der Wien, until July 1938, when she was forced to flee from the Nazis, leaving her paintings behind. Only some 30 works from this period have been recovered; two were found in the Historisches Zentrum von Wien.

Schalek was deported to the Terezin (Theresienstadt) ghetto in February 1942, where she produced more than 100 drawings and watercolors portraying fellow inmates and their life there. Because of her refusal to portray a collaborationist doctor, she was deported to Auschwitz on 18 May 1944, where she was murdered.

== Work ==
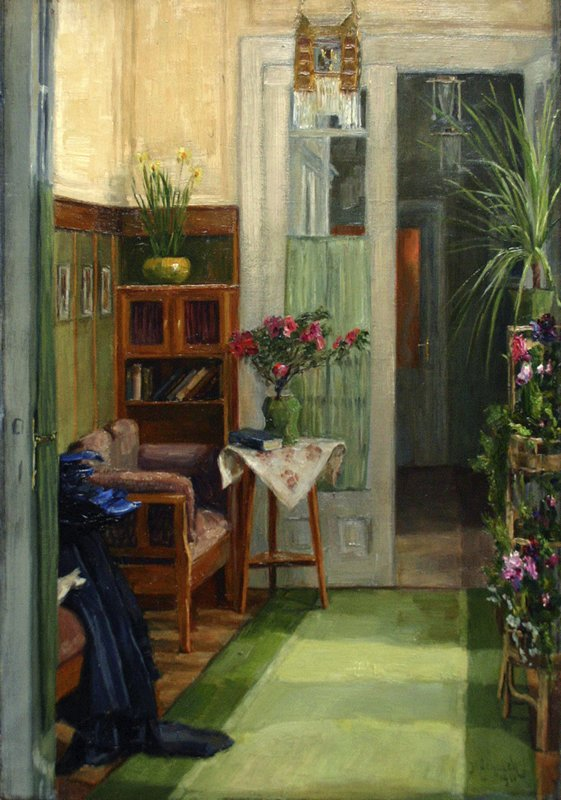
Interior, 2d january, 1920.

Her work, especially her drawings of the camp at Theresienstadt, is characterized by a sober realism. These drawings have been described by Tom L. Freudenheim, director of the Baltimore Museum of Art, as "perhaps the finest and most complete artistic oeuvre to survive the Holocaust." Recovered after the liberation, most are in the art collection of the Ghetto Fighters' House museum at kibbutz Lohamei HaGeta'ot in Israel.
