= Variations for piano (Webern) =

1936 composition by Anton Webern

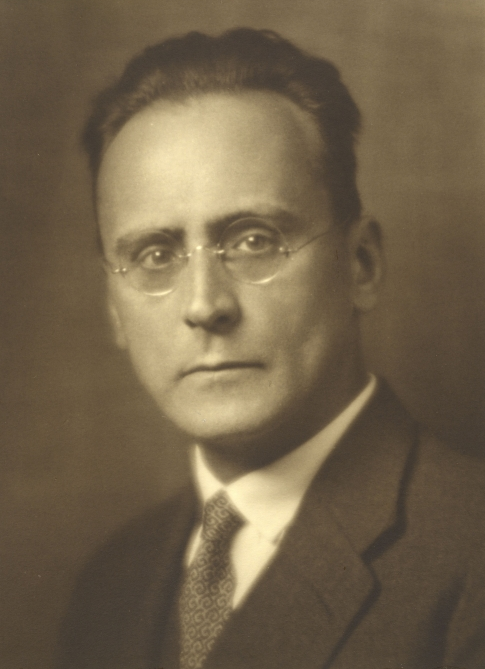
Webern, 1927, portrait by Georg Fayer

Variations for piano, Op. 27, is a twelve-tone piece for piano composed by Anton Webern in 1936. It consists of three movements:

1. Sehr mäßig (Very moderate)
2. Sehr schnell (Very fast)
3. Ruhig fließend (Calmly flowing)

Webern's only published work for solo piano, the Variations are one of his major instrumental works and a signal example of his late style. Webern dedicated the work to pianist Eduard Steuermann. It was premiered, however, (after months of coaching from Webern) by Peter Stadlen on 26 October 1937 in Vienna. Much later Stadlen produced the definitive interpretive edition of Op. 27, published by Universal Edition in 1979.

== History of composition ==
By the early 1930s, Webern was one of the composers and artists criticised by the Nazi Party, which was rapidly gaining power. By 1934, Webern's conducting career, a major source of income for the composer, was practically over, and he earned his living by teaching composition to a few private pupils. Despite the considerable financial disadvantages of this situation, the lack of a stable job provided Webern with more time to compose.

Opus 27 took Webern about a year to complete. The three movements were not composed in the order they appear in the work:

- Third movement: begun 14 October 1935, completed 8 July 1936
- First movement: begun 22 July 1936, completed 19 August 1936
- Second movement: begun 25 August 1936, completed 5 November 1936

The piece is the only work for piano solo that was published by the composer and assigned an opus number. It was also the last work by Webern to be published by Universal Edition during his lifetime.

== Analysis ==
=== Structure ===
All three movements of the work are 12-tone pieces based on the following row (as found at the beginning of the second movement):

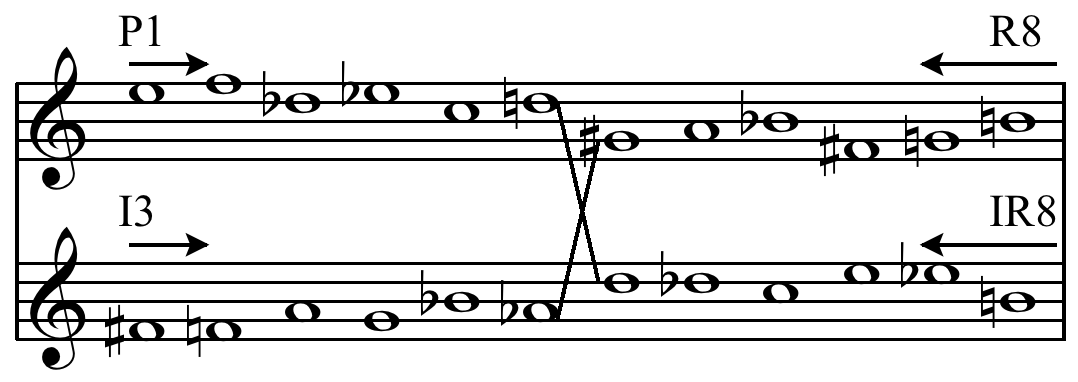
Principal forms of Webern's tone row from movement 1. The first simultaneous pairing of row forms is P1 and R8, and as with the principal forms, each hexachord fills in a chromatic fourth, with B as the pivot (end of P1 and beginning of IR8), and thus linked by the prominent tritone in the center of the row.

The work's title, Variations, is ambiguous. In a letter dated 18 July, Webern wrote: "The completed part is a variations movement; the whole will be a kind of 'Suite'". Only the third movement was completed at the time, and it is clearly a set of variations. The form of the other two movements conforms to the "Suite" plan: the first movement is a ternary form, A–B–A, and the second is a binary form. However, to refer to an entire work by the form of its last movement is very unusual, and numerous attempts have been made to explain the title.

Webern scholar Kathryn Bailey outlined three possible views on the structure of the piece. Webern's Variations may be considered any of these:

1. A three-movement sonata: sonata form – binary scherzo – variations
2. A three-movement suite: ternary movement – binary movement – variations
3. A set of variations, in which the first two movements have little connection to the third

One of the earliest explanations was offered by René Leibowitz, who in 1948 described the first movement as a theme and two variations, the second movement as a theme with a single variation, and the third movement as five variations of yet another theme. Willi Reich, a member of Arnold Schoenberg's circle, described the work as a sonatina which begins with a set of variations (first movement) and ends with a sonata form (third movement). Reich claimed his explanation was identical to Webern's and stemmed from the two men's conversations, however, the authenticity of this claim has been questioned.

Yet another explanation was provided by Friedhelm Döhl (who published Reich's analysis, but did not find it satisfactory), who viewed each of the fourteen phrases in the first movement as a variation of the prime/retrograde idea, and found the same structure in the second movement. Robert U. Nelson published a similar analysis in 1969. Finally, Kathryn Bailey's analysis suggests that the first movement is a sonata form, her ideas supported by Webern's own remarks in the original manuscript, published in 1979 by Peter Stadlen.

=== Symmetry ===
First tone row of the third movement

A particularly notable feature of Variations is symmetry, which is featured throughout the work. Horizontal symmetry can be observed, for example, in successive phrases of the first movement: bars 1–18 comprise four phrases, each built from the normal row and its retrograde stated simultaneously, and the second half of the phrase is always a reverse of the first. Each phrase is therefore a palindrome, though only the first pair of rows in the beginning of the movement is perfectly palindromic. Vertical symmetry pervades the second movement, which is a canon. The pitches are arranged around the pitch axis of A4. Each downward reaching interval is replicated exactly in the opposite direction.

== Notes ==
Sources

- Bailey, Kathryn (1991). The Twelve-note Music of Anton Webern: Old Forms in a New Language. Cambridge and New York: Cambridge University Press. ISBN 978-0-521-39088-0. Paperback reprint 2006. ISBN 978-0-521-54796-3.
- Bailey, Kathryn (1998). The Life of Webern. Cambridge University Press. ISBN 978-0-521-57566-9.
- Burge, David (December 1980). "Review: Variationen für Klavier, Op. 27 by Anton Webern, Peter Stadlen". Notes. Second Series. 37 (2): 405–406. doi:10.2307/939520. JSTOR 939520.
- Leeuw, Ton de (2005). Music of the Twentieth Century: A Study of Its Elements and Structure. Translated by Stephen Taylor. Amsterdam: Amsterdam University Press. ISBN 90-5356-765-8. Translation of Muziek van de twintigste eeuw: een onderzoek naar haar elementen en structuur. Utrecht: Oosthoek, 1964. Third impression, Utrecht: Bohn, Scheltema & Holkema, 1977. ISBN 90-313-0244-9.
- Nelson, Robert U. (Spring–Summer 1969). "Webern's Path to the Serial Variation". Perspectives of New Music. 7 (2): 73–93. doi:10.2307/832295. JSTOR 832295.
- Nolan, Catherine (Spring 1995). "Structural Levels and Twelve-Tone Music: A Revisionist Analysis of the Second Movement of Webern's 'Piano Variations Op. 27'". Journal of Music Theory. 39 (1): 47–76. doi:10.2307/843898. JSTOR 843898.
- Wason, Robert W. (1987). "Webern's 'Variations for Piano', Op. 27: Musical Structure and the Performance Score". Intégral. 1: 57–103.
- Webern, Anton (1937). Variationen für Klavier, Op. 27. Vienna: Universal Edition. UE 10881.
