= Gordon Pollock =

British barrister (1943–2019)

Alan Gordon Seton Pollock (1943–2019) was a British barrister.

== Early life and education ==
Born in London, he was the eldest child of Alan and Kathleen Pollock. His father's career in the tobacco industry led the family to live in Johannesburg and Toronto. Pollock was educated at Glenalmond College in Scotland and Upper Canada College, where he was a cricketer for the Canadian under-21 team.

Later, Pollock attended Trinity College, Cambridge, to study law. Despite being offered a fellowship at Jesus College, he missed this opportunity due to a delay in finding the offer letter. His academic career included teaching law at the University of Chicago and starting postgraduate studies in Paris, which he could not complete due to financial reasons.

Pollock married Karen Philippson, a pupil in his chambers, in 1975, and the couple had two children.

== Career ==
In 1969, Pollock was called to the Bar from Gray's Inn, and by 1978 he had become a Queen's Counsel.

Pollock's legal career focused on commercial law. He appeared in several notable cases reported in The Times, dealing with issues ranging from contract breaches to maritime losses and media law. In 1992, he became the head of chambers at 4 Essex Court, a position he held for 21 years, during which he played a major role in its transformation to Essex Court Chambers and its relocation to Lincoln's Inn Fields.

In court, Pollock was involved in several major cases, including the collapse of the International Tin Council and disputes involving high-profile clients such as Apple Inc., Elton John, and George Michael. His handling of the BCCI case against the Bank of England was particularly noteworthy, although it ended in 2005 without resolution in favor of the bank's creditors. In 2004 at the Royal Courts of Justice Pollock made the longest speech in English legal history, speaking for eighty days while representing creditors and liquidators of BCCI, seeking compensation worth £850m against the Bank of England. His record was broken in 2005 by the leading counsel for the Bank of England, Nicholas Stadlen, speaking in the same case for 119 days.
