= Nicholas Stadlen =

British judge (1950–2023)

Sir Nicholas Felix Stadlen (3 May 1950 – 5 October 2023) was a British judge who served on the High Court of England and Wales. He was appointed to the High Court's Queen's Bench Division on 2 October 2007 and retired early, on 21 April 2013. Stadlen is the father of political commentator Matthew Stadlen.

He was a first cousin twice removed of Malva Schalek, and second cousin once removed of both Lisa Fittko and Julius Epstein. His great-granduncle (by marriage) was Johann Strauss II.

== Biography ==
Nicholas Felix Stadlen was born in Hampstead, London on 3 May 1950. His parents were political activist Hedi Stadlen and pianist and musicologist Peter Stadlen. He was educated at St Paul's School, London and Trinity College, Cambridge, where he read history and classics and was president of the Cambridge Union in 1970.

Stadlen was working as a busboy in New York's Times Square on 4 April 1968, when the assassination of Martin Luther King Jr. happened in Memphis, and travelled to the south to witness the extraordinary events following his death. This awakened him to the issue of racism, which led to a lifelong interest.

In 1972 he married Frances Edith Howarth. He was called to the bar in 1976 and became a QC in 1991, and was a member of Fountain Court Chambers.

From 2006 to 2007 he conducted a series of interviews with well-known figures (Gerry Adams, Desmond Tutu, F. W. de Klerk, Simon Peres, Hanan Ashrawi, Tony Benn and David Blunkett) which were podcast by The Guardian.

In 2005 at the Royal Courts of Justice Stadlen made the longest speech in English legal history when he spoke for 119 days while representing the Bank of England in its defence of a compensation claim worth £850m made by creditors and liquidators of the Bank of Credit and Commerce International. In beginning his speech, Stadlen said "After six months, the empire strikes back." The previous record had bern held by the other side's leading counsel, Gordon Pollock QC, speaking in the same case.

Stadlen was appointed a High Court Judge and knighted in 2007. From his retirement in 2013, Stadlen researched the history of the anti-apartheid struggle in South Africa and was writing a book on the Rivonia Trial, which led to Nelson Mandela's imprisonment. In 2015–2016 he was awarded the Alistair Horne Visiting Fellow Fellowship, an "annual fellowship designed to encourage the completion of works in modern history and biography which combine academic scholarship and a wider public appeal", at St Antony's College, Oxford, to work on his book Bram Fischer QC and the Unsung Heroes of the Struggle Against Apartheid 1960–1966 (as of April 2019 unpublished).

In 2015 he appeared on the BBC Radio 4 programme Great Lives, nominating anti-apartheid lawyer Bram Fischer.

In 2017, Stadlen directed a documentary film entitled Life is Wonderful, featuring the then remaining survivors of the Rivonia trial, Denis Goldberg, Andrew Mlangeni and Ahmed Kathrada, along with lawyers Joel Joffe, George Bizos and Denis Kuny, which tells the story of the Rivonia trial. The title reflects Goldberg's words to his mother at the end of the trial on hearing that he and his comrades had been spared the death sentence, and Sir Nicholas said that he was inspired to make the film after spending a day with Goldberg.

Sir Nicholas Stadlen died from mesothelioma on 5 October 2023, at the age of 73.
