= 5 Para A Meia-Noite =

- Genre: Comedy
- Created by: Videomedia and RTP
- Starring: Filomena Cautela
- Country of origin: Portugal
- Original language: Portuguese
- No. of seasons: 21
- No. of episodes: 1365

Production
- Production location: Lisbon
- Running time: 105-120 minutes
- Production companies: Videomedia (2009-2013); Estúdios Valentim de Carvalho (2013-2015); Eyeworks Portugal (2013-2015); Warner Bros. International Television Production Portugal (2015-2016); RTP Produção (2009-present)

Original release
- Network: RTP2 (2009-2011); RTP1 (2012-)
- Release: June 22, 2009 – present

5 Para A Meia-Noite (5 to Midnight) is a late-night talk show that airs on Thursdays on the Portuguese TV channel RTP1 (formerly on RTP2). Its format is based on several American late-night talk shows.
