= Sorte Nula =

2004 film by Fernando Fragata

Sorte Nula is a Portuguese film directed by Fernando Fragata. It stars António Feio and was the highest-grossing Portuguese film in 2004.

Sorte Nula was released in December 9, 2004 and in 2005 the film won an award for Best Cinematography at the Boston International Film Festival.
