= Balas & Bolinhos: O Último Capítulo =

Balas & Bolinhos - O Último Capítulo
- Directed by: Luís Ismael
- Starring: Jorge Neto; Luís Ismael
- Release date: 6 September 2012
- Running time: 129 minutes
- Country: Portugal
- Language: Portuguese

Balas & Bolinhos - O Último Capítulo is a 2012 Portuguese action film directed by Luis Ismael.

== Plot ==
Tone, the leader of the gang, returns home after sometime abroad, to try to save his father's life that is on the verge of death, and needs a liver transplant to survive. For this task he needs the help of his gang, once again.

== Cast ==
- Jorge Neto - Rato
- Luís Ismael - Tone
- J.D. Duarte - Culatra
- João Pires - Bino
- Fernando Rocha - Faísca
