= Edmílson Viegas =

Santomean footballer

Personal information
- Full name: Edmílson Domingos Lima Viegas
- Date of birth: 29 October 1996 (age 30)
- Place of birth: São Tomé, São Tomé and Príncipe
- Height: 1.73 m (5 ft 8 in)
- Position: Winger

Team information
- Current team: Höttur/Huginn

Youth career
- 2006–2009: Alcabideche
- 2009–2011: Vendas Novas
- 2011–2016: Estoril
- 2016: Odemirense

Senior career*
Years	Team	Apps	(Gls)
2016–2017	Gafetense	7	(0)
2017–2018	Rebordosa	15	(0)
2018–2019	Estoril B	10	(2)
2019–2021	Resende	32	(2)
2021–2023	Paniliakos	2	(0)
2023	Estoril B		
2024–	Höttur/Huginn	1	(0)

International career^{‡}
2020–	São Tomé and Príncipe	2	(0)
- * Club domestic league appearances and goals as of 15 July 2024 ‡ National team caps and goals as of 00:11, 26 March 2021 (UTC)

Edmílson Domingos Lima Viegas (born 29 October 1996) is a Santomean footballer who plays as a winger for Höttur/Huginn and the São Tomé and Príncipe national team.

== International career ==
Neves made his professional debut with the São Tomé and Príncipe national team in a 2–0 2021 Africa Cup of Nations qualification loss to South Africa on 13 November 2020.
