= Robert De Niro Sr. =

American expressionist painter (1922–1993)

Bob De Niro
- Born: Robert Henry De Niro; May 3, 1922; Syracuse, New York, U.S.
- Died: May 3, 1993 (aged 71); New York City, U.S.
- Burial place: Kensico Cemetery
- Occupation: Painter
- Years active: 1932–1993
- Movement: Abstract expressionism
- Spouse: Virginia Admiral (m. 1942; div. 1945)
- Partner: Robert Duncan (1944–1950)
- Children: Robert De Niro
- Relatives: Drena De Niro (adoptive granddaughter); Raphael De Niro (grandson)

Robert Henry De Niro (May 3, 1922 – May 3, 1993), better known as Robert or Bob De Niro Sr., was an American painter and the father of actor Robert De Niro.

== Life and early career ==
Bob De Niro was born in Syracuse, New York, to an Irish-American mother, Helen M. (née O'Reilly; 1899–1999). Helen's mother was Mary E. Burns (born to John and Mary Burns) and her father was Dennis Francis O'Reilly, born to Dundrum's Ellen Hall, the second wife of Edward O'Reilly. There was previous confusion about Dennis' maternity, his mother previously thought to be Edward's second wife Margaret.

De Niro's Italian-American father, Henry Martin De Niro (1897–1976), was born to parents who emigrated from Ferrazzano in 1887, Angelina Mercurio and Giovanni Di Niro.

Bob was the eldest of three children; he and siblings John and Joan were raised in Syracuse. De Niro studied at Black Mountain College under Josef Albers from 1939 to 1940. While Albers' highly analytical approach to painting did not appeal to De Niro's more instinctive style, the experience and international perspective of the Bauhaus master nonetheless left a lasting impression. De Niro studied with Hans Hofmann at his Provincetown, Massachusetts, summer school. Hofmann's teaching on Abstract Expressionism and Cubist formalism had a strong influence on De Niro's development as a mature artist.

At Hofmann's summer school, he met fellow student Virginia Admiral, whom he married in 1942. The couple moved into a large, airy loft in New York's Greenwich Village, where they were able to paint. They surrounded themselves with an illustrious circle of friends, including writers Anaïs Nin and Henry Miller, playwright Tennessee Williams, and the actress and famous Berlin dancer Valeska Gert. Admiral and De Niro separated shortly after their son Robert Anthony De Niro was born in August 1943 after De Niro Sr. came out as gay. In 1944, De Niro had a relationship with the poet Robert Duncan.

After studying with Hans Hofmann in New York and Provincetown and Josef Albers at Black Mountain College, North Carolina in the late 1930s and early 1940s, De Niro worked for five years at Hilla Rebay's legendary Museum of Non-Objective Art. In 1945, he was included in a group show at Peggy Guggenheim's Art of This Century in New York, which was a leading gallery for the art of both established European modernists and members of the emerging Abstract Expressionist group like Jackson Pollock, Mark Rothko, Robert Motherwell, and Clyfford Still. De Niro had his first solo exhibition at Guggenheim's gallery in April and May of the following year. At that point, he was primarily working in an abstract manner, often with figural references. Much of his work from this period was lost in a studio fire in 1949.

De Niro Sr.'s Flowers in a Blue Vase, 1966

De Niro had a series of solo exhibitions in the 1950s at the Charles Egan Gallery in New York, which exhibited the work of Willem de Kooning and other early abstract expressionist artists. Critics praised DeNiro's compositions filled with improvised areas of vibrant color that gave way to loosely painted still lifes and curvaceous nudes. By the mid-1950s, De Niro was regularly included in important group exhibitions such as the Whitney Annual, the Stable Annual, and the Jewish Museum. He was awarded a Longview Foundation award in 1958.

From 1961 to 1964, De Niro traveled to France to paint in Paris and in the surrounding countryside. Collector Joseph Hirshhorn purchased a number of the artist's paintings and works on paper during this period through De Niro's gallerist, Virginia Zabriskie, which are now in the permanent collection of the Hirshhorn Museum and Sculpture Garden in Washington, DC. In 2015, a number of De Niro paintings were sold at Christie's auction house by the order of the trustees of the Hirshhorn Museum and Sculpture Garden to benefit its acquisition program. In 1968, he was awarded a Guggenheim Fellowship.

== Later career ==
Throughout the 1970s and 1980s, De Niro continued to exhibit in museums and galleries throughout the United States, including New York, San Francisco, Kansas City, Los Angeles, and Washington, D.C. He taught at several art schools and colleges including the New York Studio School, the Cooper Union, the New School for Social Research and the School of Visual Arts. De Niro was a visiting artist at Michigan State University's Department of Art in the spring of 1974.

His work is included in several museum collections including: Albright-Knox Art Gallery, Arkansas Arts Center, Brooklyn Museum, Baltimore Museum of Art, The Butler Institute of American Art, Corcoran Gallery of Art, Crocker Art Museum, The Denver Art Museum, The Heckscher Museum of Art, Hirshhorn Museum and Sculpture Garden, Kansas City Art Institute, the Metropolitan Museum of Art, the National Academy Museum, Mint Museum, Parrish Art Museum, Provincetown Art Association and Museum, Smithsonian American Art Museum, Wadsworth Atheneum, Weatherspoon Art Museum, Whitney Museum of American Art, Yale University Art Gallery, and the Yellowstone Art Museum.

== Death and legacy ==
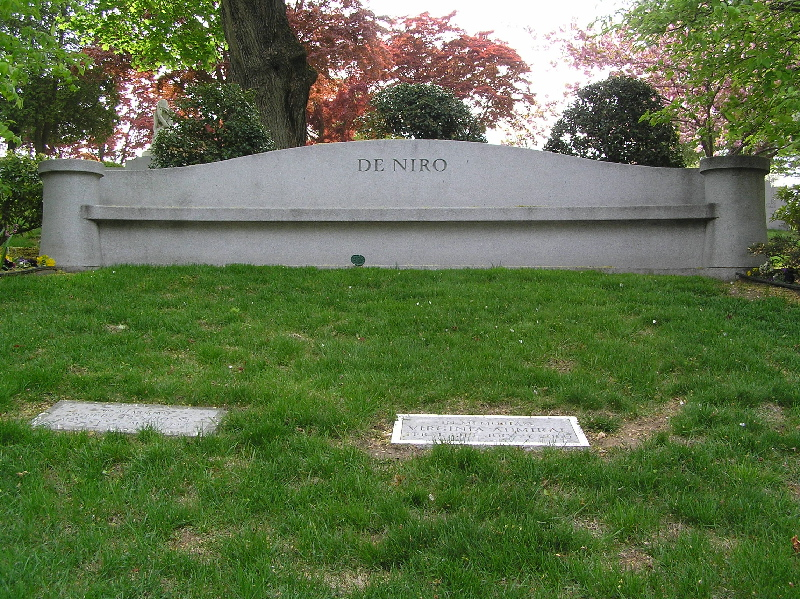
The De Niro family grave in Kensico Cemetery

De Niro Sr. died of cancer on the morning of May 3, 1993 (his 71st birthday), at his Manhattan home. He is interred at Kensico Cemetery in Valhalla, New York.

The 1993 film A Bronx Tale was dedicated to De Niro after his death; it was the directorial debut of his son, Robert Anthony De Niro.

In 2010, Robert Anthony De Niro announced the creation of the Robert De Niro Sr. Prize, an annual $25,000 prize administered by the Tribeca Film Institute and funded by Robert Anthony De Niro that "focuses on a mid-career American artist devoted to the pursuit of excellence and innovation in painting." Past winners include Stanley Whitney, Joyce Pensato, Catherine Murphy and Laura Owens.

De Niro Sr. is the subject of the 2014 short documentary Remembering the Artist. According to Robert Anthony De Niro, "The thought of what he's done, all his work, I can't not but make sure that it's held up and remembered... So I just want to see him get his due. That's my responsibility and he used to always say that artists are always recognized after they're long gone."
