= Virginia Admiral =

American painter and poet (1915–2000)

- Born: Virginia Holton Admiral; February 4, 1915; The Dalles, Oregon, U.S.
- Died: July 27, 2000 (aged 85); New York City, U.S.
- Occupation: Painter
- Years active: 1932–2000
- Spouse: Robert De Niro Sr. (m. 1942; div. 1945)
- Children: Robert De Niro
- Relatives: Drena De Niro (adoptive granddaughter); Raphael De Niro (grandson)

Virginia Holton Admiral or Virginia De Niro (February 4, 1915 – July 27, 2000) was an American painter and poet. She was also the mother of actor Robert De Niro. Admiral studied painting under Hans Hofmann in New York, and her work was included in the Peggy Guggenheim collection.

== Life and work ==
Admiral was born in Oregon, to Alice Caroline (née Groman), a school teacher, and Donald Admiral, a grain broker. Admiral was raised as a Presbyterian but later became an atheist during her adulthood. Her father had English, French, and Dutch ancestry, and her mother was of German descent. In 1920, she was residing in Danville, Illinois, according to the census, with her parents and younger sister, Eleanor. By 1930, Virginia's parents had divorced and she was living with her mother and sister in Berkeley, California. While in Berkeley, her mother became a school teacher.

From 1932 to 1935, Admiral was an undergraduate at Coe College in Cedar Rapids, Iowa, where she majored in journalism. Admiral studied at the Art Institute of Chicago under Hans Hofmann. In 1938, she worked on the Federal Art Project, in Oakland, California. While living in Berkeley, California, she had been part of an off-campus art, socialist, and literary scene. Having traveled together from California to Greenwich Village, New York, Admiral was an intimate friend of poet Robert Duncan throughout the 1940s as well as other artists and writers in the Village scene. Among them were Anaïs Nin and Kenneth Patchen. With Duncan, she produced an issue of the magazine Epitaph (later renamed The Experimental Review).

Admiral, a painter, met Robert De Niro Sr., an aspiring artist, at one of Hans Hofmann's painting classes in Provincetown, Massachusetts. They first moved into a loft apartment on E. 14th Street, later to an apartment on 8th Street, and then settled into one on Bleecker Street in Greenwich Village. They married in December, 1942. In August, 1943, Virginia gave birth to their son, actor and director Robert De Niro Jr.

For a time, Admiral worked as a typist for Anaïs Nin. Both she and husband Robert wrote erotica briefly for Nin. She and Robert De Niro divorced in 1945, but remained close throughout their lives. When Robert Sr. was stricken with cancer, she took him in during his last years. Later, in New York, she wrote for True Crimes magazine.

In 1942, Admiral exhibited her art in the Springs Salon for Young Artists at Peggy Guggenheim's "Art of This Century Gallery" in Manhattan. The same year, she sold a painting to the Museum of Modern Art for $100. She was the first of her artist cohort to sell a painting to the Modern; Jackson Pollock had his first sale to the museum two years later. She had a solo show at the same gallery in 1946 and her work was included in the Peggy Guggenheim Collection at the Venice Biennale in 1947. In later years, from 1973 to 1980, her art showed at Buecker & Harpsichords gallery.

Admiral was active in political movements against American involvement in the Vietnam War and for the rights of artists and the poor. In the 1960s, she was instrumental in obtaining low-cost housing for artists working in the SoHo area of New York. Her work is in the permanent collections of the Metropolitan Museum of Art and the Museum of Modern Art in New York and the Peggy Guggenheim Collection in Venice. Additionally, her papers are held in the Archives of American Art at the Smithsonian Institution.
