= Peter Stadlen =

Austrian pianist, musicologist and critic

Peter Stadlen (14 July 1910 – 21 January 1996) was an Austrian pianist, musicologist and critic, specialising in the study and interpretation of Beethoven and the composers of the Second Viennese School.

Stadlen, who was born in Vienna, initially studied piano there with Felix Weingartner and composition with Joseph Marx and Max Springer (1877–1954). He then continued his piano studies in Berlin between 1929 and 1933 with Leonid Kreutzer. By 1934 he had embarked on a career as concert pianist. Stadlen premiered the Variations for piano, Op. 27 by Webern on 26 October 1937 in Vienna under the direction of the composer. (Much later he edited the definitive interpretive edition, published by Universal Edition in 1979). Stadlen was also the soloist in the German premiere of Schoenberg’s Piano Concerto at the Darmstadt Summer School on 17 July 1948.

After the Anschluss, Stadlen left Austria and sought refuge in Britain in 1938. However, two years later he was interned and deported to Australia (between 1940 and 1942). Back in Britain he resumed performances at the National Gallery Concerts (organised by Myra Hess) with the Austrian Musicians Group, and in regular contemporary music broadcasts with the BBC. Eventually, however, a neurological finger malfunction caused him to give up performing, and he became a music critic, serving the Daily Telegraph for 26 years (the last decade as chief music critic, succeeding Martin Cooper). He retired in 1985. He became increasingly disillusioned with serial music and this was reflected in his criticism of contemporary music.

Stadlen spent many years trying to track down Beethoven's metronome, an invention which Beethoven had commissioned. It was believed that the weight on his metronome was faulty as some of the speeds written on his pieces seemed incorrect. He wished to ascertain the make-up of this weight and to see the correct speeds which Beethoven himself had intended. He finally tracked it down to a small antiques shop only to discover that, although the metronome itself was intact, the weight itself was missing.

Stadlen was a lecturer in music at the University of Reading (1965–1969) and visiting fellow of All Souls College, Oxford (1967–1968). He was married to the philosopher, political activist and musicologist Hedi Stadlen, with whom he lived in Hampstead. There were two sons: Nicholas (who became a High Court judge) and Godfrey (a civil servant in the Home Office). He died in London. His archive and scores are preserved by the Gesellschaft der Musikfreunde in Vienna.

== Publications ==
- 'Serialism Reconsidered', The Score, No.22, February 1958
- Letter to the Editor, Tempo, New Ser., No. 88 (Spring, 1969), p. 57
- 'Schindler's Beethoven Forgeries', The Musical Times, Vol. 118, No. 1613. (July 1977), pp. 549–552.
- 'The aesthetics of popular music', in British Journal of Aesthetics 2 (4) (1962), pp. 351–361.
