= Love Streams (film) =

1984 film by John Cassavetes

- Directed by: John Cassavetes
- Screenplay by: Ted Allan; John Cassavetes
- Based on: Love Streams by Ted Allan
- Produced by: Menahem Golan; Yoram Globus
- Starring: Gena Rowlands; John Cassavetes; Diahnne Abbott; Seymour Cassel
- Cinematography: Al Ruban
- Edited by: George C. Villaseñor
- Music by: Bo Harwood
- Distributed by: Cannon Films
- Release date: August 24, 1984
- Running time: 141 minutes
- Country: United States
- Language: English

Love Streams is a 1984 American film directed by John Cassavetes, in what would be his final independent feature and penultimate directorial project. The film tells the story of a middle-aged brother (Cassavetes) and sister (Gena Rowlands) who find themselves relying on one another after being abandoned by their loved ones.

The film was entered into the 34th Berlin International Film Festival where it won the Golden Bear.

== Plot ==
Undergoing a messy divorce from a husband, and daughter, who are tired of her continuously overwrought emotional states, Sarah Lawson visits her brother Robert Harmon, an alcoholic playboy and writer. Robert is in a tenuous relationship with Susan, a professional singer, although he carefully avoids any real emotional commitment to anyone. Robert, who has not seen his son since birth, is visited by his ex-wife, who forces him to take care of their eight-year-old for 24 hours.

Robert's son is terrified by the hedonistic, decadent, womanizing world of his father and begs to be taken home following an overnight trip to Las Vegas filled with gambling and prostitutes. After dropping him off, Robert is beaten up by the boy's stepfather, after which his son testifies his love for Robert.

Fleeing the scene, Robert returns home to take care of his sister, his "best friend." Sarah tries with some success to curb the nihilistic self-destruction of Robert's life and simultaneously deal with her own depression and divorce. She buys him some farm animals in the hope he can give his love to them; Robert struggles between his intense desire to protect his sister and the challenge of accepting her freedom as the necessary cost of love. Finally, after a bizarre dream of being in an opera with her husband and daughter, Sarah feels ready to resume her life and possibly even get her family back, or not. Before Sarah walks away from the house in the middle of a storm as Robert looks on, he hallucinates that the dog she gave him has turned into a naked man. Robert laughs hysterically.

== Cast ==
- Gena Rowlands as Sarah Lawson
- John Cassavetes as Robert Harmon
- Diahnne Abbott as Susan
- Seymour Cassel as Jack Lawson
- Margaret Abbott as Margarita
- Jakob Shaw as Albie Swanson
- Eddy Donno as Stepfather Swanson
- Joan Foley as Judge Dunbar
- Al Ruban as Milton Kravitz
- Tom Badal as Sam the lawyer
- Doe Avedon as Mrs. Kiner
- Leslie Hope as Joanie

== Production ==
Love Streams is based on the 1980 play of the same name by Ted Allan, but the correlation between the screenplay and the play is minimal. In the stage production, the role of Robert Harmon was played by Jon Voight; Cassavetes took this role for the film version.

The visual style of the film is decidedly different from Cassavetes's other works; it contains no hand-held camera work (a trademark of his visual style). Much of it was shot inside Cassavetes' home.

== Release ==
Love Streams was originally released with a running time of 141 minutes. It was briefly available on videotape in the mid 1980s in a version cut to 122 minutes by the distributor; one scene was edited and several unusual visual effects (the insertion of black leader and jump cuts) were removed. In 2003, it was released on DVD in France (along with A Child Is Waiting) in its entirety. The 141-minute version received an American DVD and Blu-ray release for the first time in 2014 as part of The Criterion Collection.

== Awards ==
The film was entered into the 34th Berlin International Film Festival where it won the Golden Bear.

== Reception ==
On the review aggregator website Rotten Tomatoes, 100% of 19 critics' reviews are positive, with an average rating of 8/10.

Japanese film director Shinji Aoyama listed Love Streams as one of the Greatest Films of All Time in 2012. He said, "When I think about Cassavetes, I always feel happy. I feel glad that I like movies. I'm sure I will always feel this way until the day I die, and I intend to feel this way too. At the end of Love Streams, Cassavetes smiles as he sees the dog next to him, which turned into a naked man. I live my life always wishing I can smile like that."

Roger Ebert gave the film 4 out of 4 stars, noting: "Viewers raised on trained and tame movies may be uncomfortable in the world of Cassavetes; his films are built around lots of talk and the waving of arms and the invoking of the gods... Sometimes (as in Husbands) the wild truth-telling approach evaporates into a lot of empty talk and play-acting. In Love Streams, it works."

In 2015, the BBC named the film the 63rd greatest American movie ever made.

== See also ==
- I'm Almost Not Crazy: John Cassavetes, the Man and His Work
