= Amélia Videira =

Portuguese actor

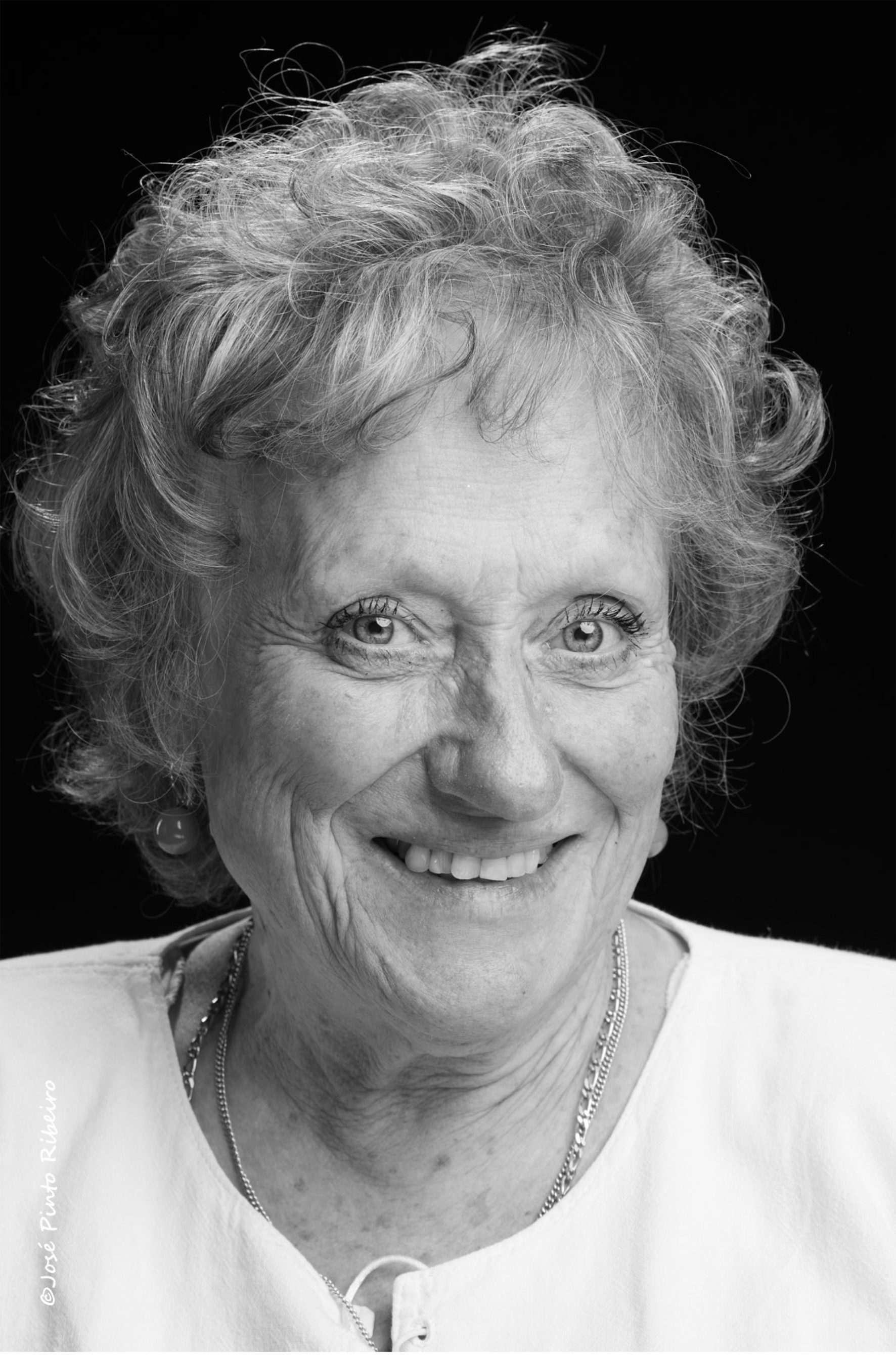
- Born: Maria Amélia da Cruz Lobo Videira; 18 June 1945; Lisbon, Portugal
- Occupation: Actor
- Years active: 43 (as of 2021)
- Awards: Prémio Femina 2010

Amélia Videira is a Portuguese actress, particularly known for her roles in soap operas and films on Portuguese television.

Maria Amélia da Cruz Lobo Videira was born in the Portuguese capital of Lisbon on 18 June 1945. She wanted to be an actress from a young age but this was vetoed by her mother who would not allow her to attend the National Conservatory of Lisbon to train as an actor. Instead, she studied at the Lisbon Theatre and Film School, obtaining a master's degree in theatre studies and followed this with a course at the University of Minho to be a specialist trainer. She then took continuing education courses at the Faculty of Medicine of the University of Lisbon. She received training in Movement Analysis, Psychodrama, Dance and Disability, Dance Therapy, Mime, Psychomotricity and Relaxation, and other subjects.

== Acting career ==
Because of her mother's opposition, Videira did not begin her acting career until 1978, after she had married at the age of 32. Between that year and 1981 she worked with Lisbon's Teatro Ádóque theatre cooperative with the director, Francisco Nicholson. She then joined the Comuna Teatro de Pesquisa in Lisbon, with the director João Mota. She continued performing in live theatre until 2007. Her first television performance was with the series Histórias com Pés e Cabeça (Stories with Feet and Head), a children's programme. Other series she performed in included Lá em Casa Tudo Bem (Back at home everything is fine), Clube das Chaves (Club of Keys), A Minha Sogra é uma Bruxa (My mother-in-law is a witch), Querido Professor (Dear Professor), Destino Imortal, and Chiquititas. She also made seven films and has appeared on television programmes on many occasions as herself. She continues to act and was working on a TV film in 2021.

== Other activities ==
Videira took many courses to become a specialist trainer in Continuing Education for teachers. She also participated, either as a trainer or as a speaker, in colloquia, seminars and congresses linked to the areas of art education, and intellectual disability.

== Awards and honours ==
- Videira was awarded the 2010 Femina Prize for merit in the Performing Arts.
