= Fabrizio Ferraro =

Italian researcher

- Born: March 9, 1971 (age 55); Naples
- Citizenship: Italian
- Education: Università degli studi di Napoli-Federico II; Stanford University (M.A., Ph.D.)
- Occupations: Researcher and professor
- Employer: IESE Business School

Fabrizio Ferraro (Naples, 9 March 1971) is an organization theorist, known for his work on performativity, responsible investment, and robust action. He is the academic director of the Institute for Sustainable Leadership, and professor of Strategic Management at the IESE Business School.

== Academic and professional career ==
Ferraro has a PhD in Management Science from Stanford University, where he also obtained a master's degree in sociology. He also holds a degree in economics from the Università degli studi di Napoli-Federico II.

A member of the academic faculty at IESE, he is the academic director of the Institute for Sustainability Leadership and teaches classes on strategic leadership, strategy execution and responsible investment. He was a member (and Chairman) of the Academic Advisory Committee of the United Nations' Principles for Responsible Investment (PRI), the main international network of responsible investors. He is a member of the editorial boards of several academic journals, including Administrative Science Quarterly,Organization Studies, and Academy of Management Discoveries.

== Research ==
Ferraro's research in the field of organizational theory focuses on the emergence and institutionalization of new organizational practices. Their seminal articles (2005, 2009) argue that economic language and assumptions, when widely adopted, can become self-fulfilling prophecies, shaping management practices and organizational behavior. This work broadened the debate on the performativity of social theories, showing how they not only describe, but also shape the realities they study.

Ferraro has also contributed to our understanding of the emergence and institutionalization of responsible investment. His research, in collaboration with Shipeng Yan and John Almandoz, has examined how the integration of environmental, social and governance (ESG) criteria into traditional investment practices navigates the complex interplay between financial and social logics. Their work explores how institutional entrepreneurs are shaping the field of ESG and impact investing, contributing to a deeper understanding of the tensions between profit maximization and the pursuit of social goals.

Ferraro developed the robust action framework, an innovative approach to tackling grand challenges such as climate change and poverty. This framework emphasizes participatory architecture, multivocal inscriptions and distributed experimentation as strategies for addressing complex and large-scale social problems. His work on robust action has provided new theoretical and practical approaches to address global challenges.

== Awards and recognition ==
Between 2011 and 2015, Ferraro received a grant from the European Research Council (ERC) to study the emergence of responsible investment. He has received several awards, including the IESE Research Excellence Award in 2006, the Academy of Management Review award for best article in 2005, and the Roland Calori award for best article published in Organization Studies in 2017.

== Academic publications ==
His articles, published in recognized academic journals, including Administrative Science Quarterly, Academy of Management Review, Academy of Management Journal, Organization Science, and Organization Studies, have received more than 6,000 citations on Google Scholar. The most cited articles are:

- Ferraro, Fabrizio, Jeffrey Pfeffer, and Robert I. Sutton. 2005. “Economics Language and Assumptions : How Theories Can Become Self-Fulfilling.” Academy of management review 30(1): 8–24.
- Ferraro, F., Etzion, D., & Gehman, J. (2015). Tackling Grand Challenges Pragmatically: Robust Action Revisited. Organization Studies, 36(3), 363–390. (Original work published 2015)
- O'Mahony, S. and Ferraro, F. 2007: “The Emergence of Governance in an Open Source Community” Academy of Management Journal, 50 (5), 1079 - 1106.
- Ferraro, F. and Dror, E. 2010.”The Role of Analogy in the Institutionalization of Sustainability Reporting.” Organization Science, 21 (5), 1092 - 1107.
