= Luísa Beirão =

Portuguese model

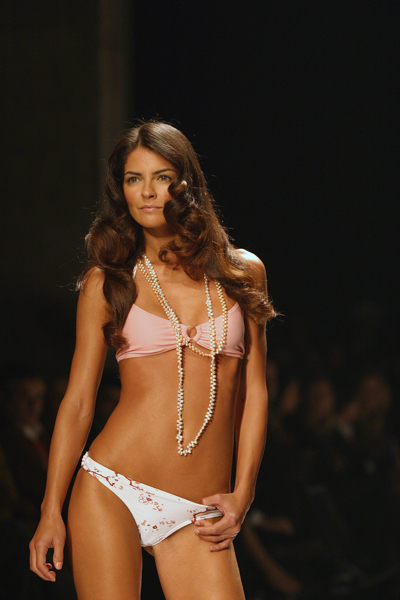
- Portuguese model Luísa Beirão at Portugal Fashion (2004)
- Born: 29 August 1977 (age 49); Sever do Vouga, Portugal
- Spouse: Miguel Pedrosa (June 1999–March 2011)
- Modeling information
- Height: 1.77 m (5 ft 10 in)
- Hair color: Dark brown
- Eye color: Brown

Luísa Beirão (born 29 August 1977 in Sever do Vouga) is a Portuguese model. She was a spokesmodel of Nivea and Coca-Cola in Portugal.

== Private life ==
Luísa married Portuguese football player Miguel Pedrosa in June 1999. The couple is now divorced. Beirão has since been in a relationship with Gonçalo Santana Lopes, the oldest son of former Portuguese Prime Minister Pedro Santana Lopes.

== See also ==
- Geraldes, Ivo (29 January 2016). "Luísa Beirão em forma na 'Men's Health'" (in Portuguese). Diário de Notícias.
- Andrade, Sara (17 October 2016). "Portugal fashion em 125 imagens" (in Portuguese). GQ Portugal.
- "Luísa Beirão profile" (in Portuguese). Lux. 16 August 2016.
- Pinheiro, Maria João (16 October 2016). "Luísa Beirão troca a moda pelo desporto" (in Portuguese). MOVE NOTICIAS.
