= Fernando Fragata =

Portuguese film director (1965–2024)

Fernando Fragata (1965 – 8 November 2024) was a Portuguese film director.

== Life and career ==
Fragata started his career in Portugal with the short film Love & Alchemy, which won him several International awards for best short film and best director. His other Portuguese films include the romantic comedy Sweet Nightmare and the critically acclaimed action comedy Chasing Life (Pulsação Zero). In 2004 he wrote and directed the mystery crime The Trunk (Sorte Nula), which became the top grossing Portuguese film of that year. Backlight came in 2010 and again broke box office records in his home country.

Fragata died on 8 November 2024, at the age of 58.

== Filmography ==
- Love & Alchemy (1995)
- Sweet Nightmare (1998)
- Chasing Life (2002)
- Sorte Nula (2004)
- Backlight (2010)
