= Mass media in Portugal =

Mass media in Portugal includes a variety of online, print, and broadcast formats, such as radio, television, newspapers, and magazines. During most of the 20th century, the Portuguese government censored the media until the "1976 constitution guaranteed freedom of the press."

== Newspapers ==
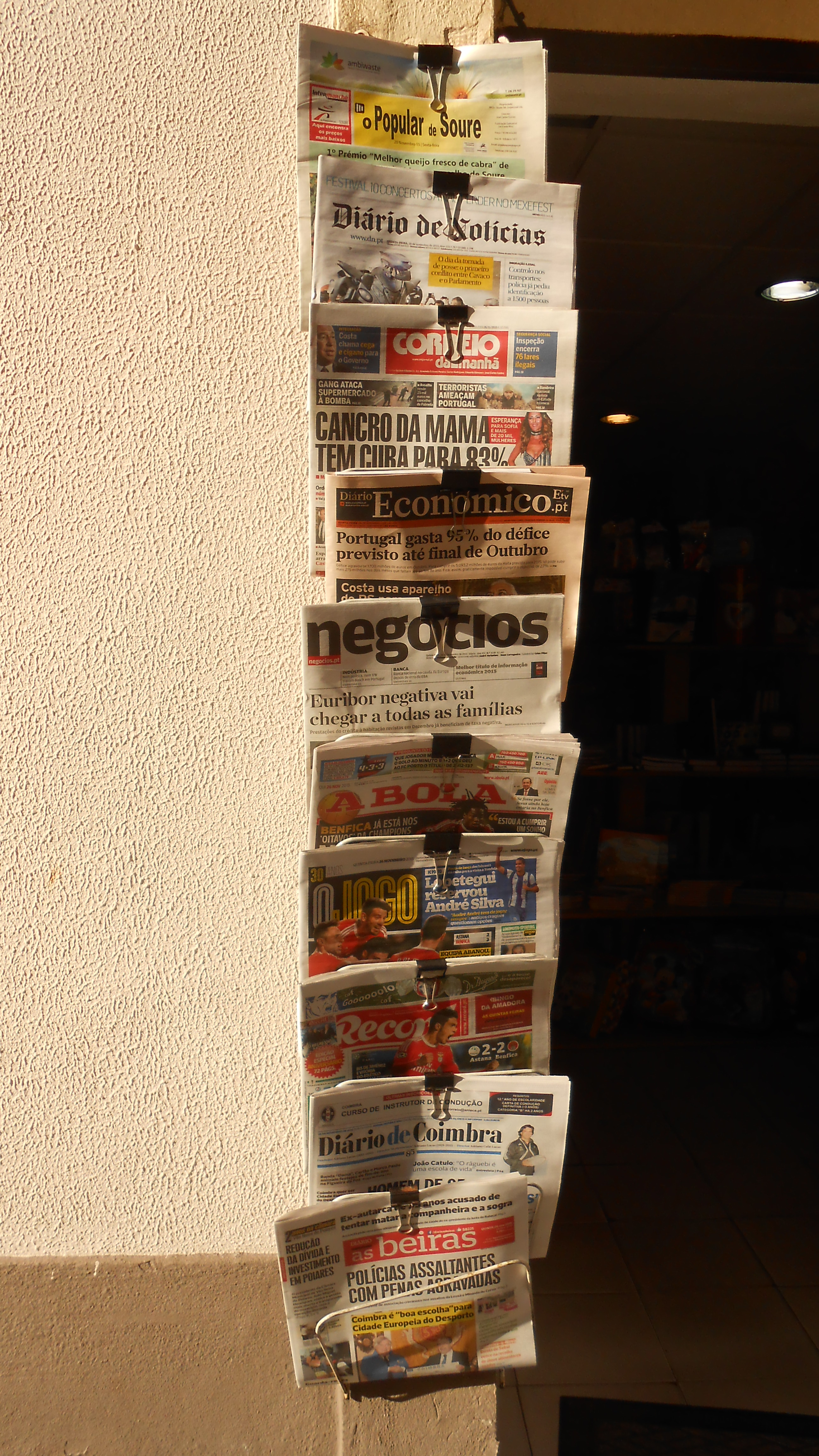
Newspaper stand, during 2015.

As of 2017 major newspapers in Portugal include Correio da Manhã, Expresso, Jornal de Notícias, Observador (online only) and Público. The 5 most read newspapers in Portugal, by the second quarter of 2026: (Note: Not all newspapers report their circulation numbers.)

5 most read newspapers
Position	Station	Group (Owner)	Circulation (Note: Digital+Printed)
1	Expresso	Impresa	82,196
2	Público	Sonae	63,294
3	Correio da Manhã	Medialivre	31,808
4	Record	Medialivre	20,406
5	Jornal de Notícias	Global Media Group	16,602

== Magazines ==
The 5 most read magazines in Portugal, by the second quarter of 2026: (Note: Not all magazines report their circulation numbers.)

5 most read magazines
Position	Station	Group (Owner)	Circulation (Note: Digital+Printed)
1	TV 7 Dias	Impala	21,619
2	Maria	Impala	19,618
3	Nova Gente	Impala	19,362
4	TV Guia	Medialivre	17,999
5	Sábado	Medialivre	17,120

== Radio ==
Monthly radio audience shares in September 2026 of the 5 main radio stations in Portugal:

5 most heard radio stations
Position	Station	Group (Owner)	Share of total audience (%)
1	Rádio Comercial	Bauer Media Audio Portugal	25.9%
2	RFM	Grupo Renascença	20.0%
3	Rádio Renascença	Grupo Renascença	9.4%
4	M80 Radio	Bauer Media Audio Portugal	7.9%
5	RTP Antena 1	RTP	4.4%

== Television ==
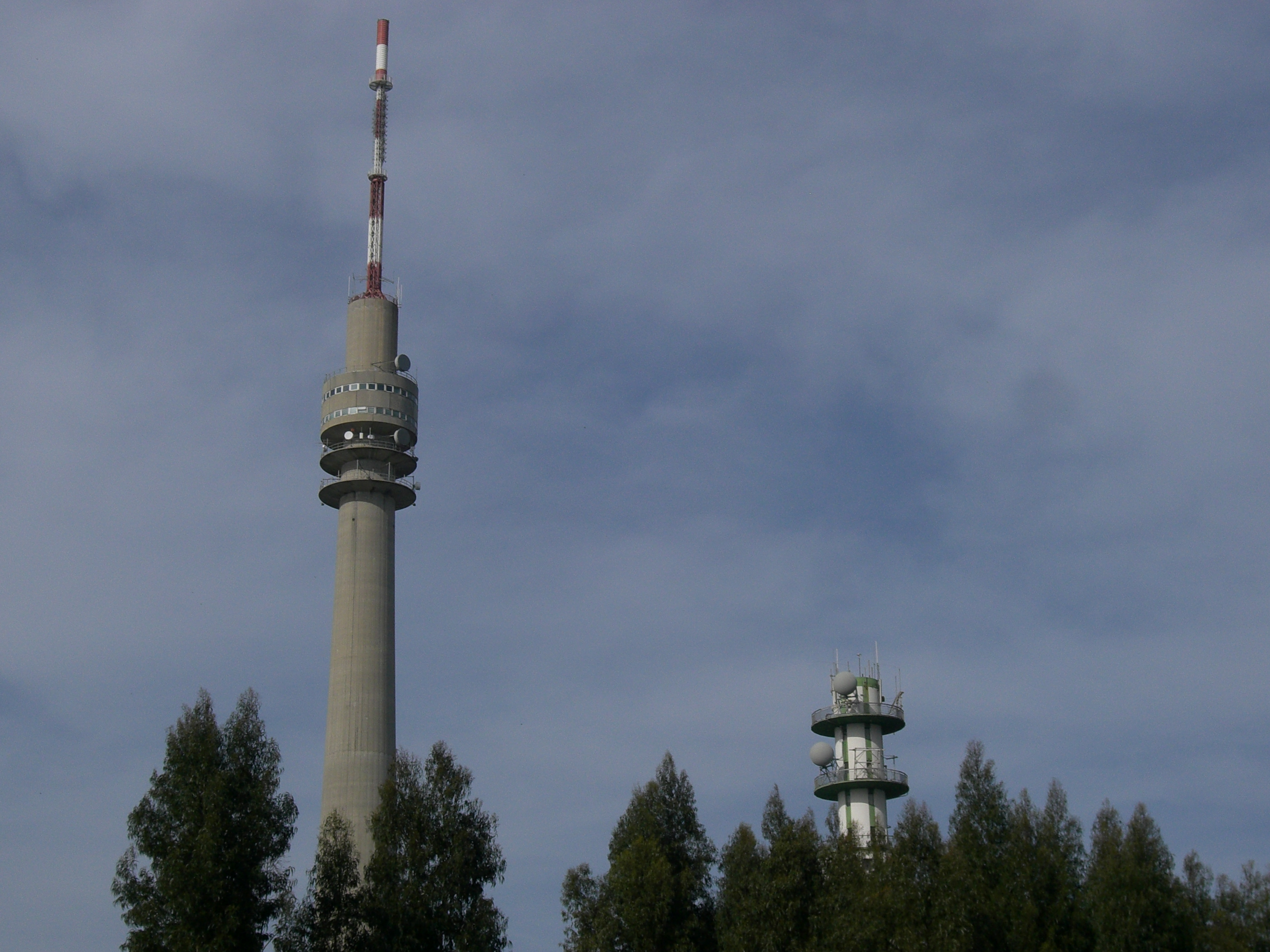
RTP Porto TV tower in Vila Nova de Gaia

Monthly viewing shares in October 2026 of the 5 main TV channels in Portugal:

5 most viewed TV channels
Position	Channel	Group (Owner)	Share of total viewing (%)
1	SIC	Impresa	14.1%
2	TVI	Media Capital	13.4%
3	RTP1	RTP	11.9%
4	CMTV	Medialivre	5.7%
5	CNN Portugal	Media Capital	2.6%

== See also ==
- Telecommunications in Portugal
- Autoridade Nacional de Comunicações (est. 1981)
- Cinema of Portugal
- Portuguese literature

== Bibliography ==
=== in English ===
- Traquina, Nelson (1990) Media Concentration in Portugal, European Institute for the Media files, Manchester.
- Helena Sousa (1994), Portuguese media: new forms of concentration, University of Minho, hdl:1822/1620
- Manuel Pinto; Helena Sousa (2004). "Portugal". In Euromedia Research Group; Mary Kelly; et al. (eds.). Media in Europe (PDF) (3rd ed.). SAGE Publications. pp. 180–190. ISBN 978-0-7619-4132-3.
- Paulo Faustino. "Media Concentration, Market Dynamics and Pluralism of Information: the Portuguese case" (PDF). International Political Science Association. Archived from the original (PDF) on 2016-03-04. 2009?
- Anabela Carvalho (2010). "Portugal: Media System" (PDF). International Encyclopedia of Communication. Wiley-Blackwell.
- Douglas L. Wheeler; Walter C. Opello Jr. (2010). "Media". Historical Dictionary of Portugal (3rd ed.). Scarecrow Press. ISBN 978-0-8108-7075-8.

=== in Portuguese ===
- Artur Anselmo [in Portuguese] (1981). Origens da imprensa em Portugal (in Portuguese). Imprensa Nacional-Casa da Moeda. ISBN 9789729101090. OCLC 927856821.
- Agee, Warren K. and Nelson Traquina (1984) O Quarto Poder Frustrado: Os Meios de Comunicação Social no Portugal Pós-Revolucionário [Media in Post-Revolutionary Portugal], Lisboa, Vega.
