= List of radio stations in Portugal =

The following is an list of radio stations in Portugal.

== National radio stations ==
Rádio e Televisão de Portugal

- RTP Antena 1 (news, light music)
- RTP Antena 2 (jazz, classical music, culture)
- RTP Antena 3 (alternative music, promotion of portuguese bands)

Grupo Renascença

- Rádio Renascença (news, pop music, oldies)
- RFM (pop music)
- Mega Hits (pop Music, R&B, dance)

Bauer Media Audio Portugal

- Rádio Comercial (pop music)
- M80 Radio (oldies music - 1970s, 1980s, 1990s and 2000s)
- Cidade FM (R&B, dance music)
- Smooth FM (jazz, blues, soul, bossa nova)
- Batida FM (indie, alternative rock, portuguese music)

Global Media Group

- TSF (news, contemporary music)

Grupo Música no Coração

- Sudoeste (R&B, dance music)
- Rádio Marginal (adult contemporary music)
- Rádio Amália (fado music)
- Rádio Nova Era (R&B, dance music, house)

Medialivre

- CM Rádio (news)

Grupo Everything is New

- Rádio Radar (alternative music, rock)
- Oxigénio (R&B, dance music)

Associação Rádio Maria Portugal

- Radio Maria (Christian music, Catholic Church devotions and prayers)

Other radios

- Radio Observador (news)
- Estação Orbital (dance music)
- Rádio NoAr (portuguese popular music)
- Rádio Hiper FM (R&B, dance music)
- Nove3Cinco (dance music, house)
- Rádio 105.4 FM (Rock)
- Rádio Nova (news, adult contemporary music)

For more detailed listings, please see FMLIST or FMSCAN

== Digital radio stations ==
Rádio e Televisão de Portugal

- RTP Lusitânia (portuguese music)
- RTP Zig Zag (children's programmes)
- RTP Fado (fado music)
- RTP Ópera (opera music)
- RTP Jazz in (jazz music)

Grupo Renascença

- Rádio Renascença Rock in Rio (rock music)
- Rádio Renascença Hotel Califórnia (rock music)
- Rádio Renascença Ponto PT (portuguese music)
- Rádio Renascença Non-Stop (music)
- 80's RFM (80's music)
- 90's RFM (90's music)
- 00's RFM (2000's music)
- RFM Jazzy (jazz music)
- RFM Novas (music)
- RFM Dance It (dance music)
- RFM Latinas (latin music)
- RFM Oceano Pacifico (disco music)
- RFM Rocks (rock music)
- RFM Toca Portugal (portuguese music)
- Mega Hits Dance (dance music)
- Mega Hits Hot N Slow (music)
- Mega Hits Fresh (music)

Bauer Media Audio Portugal

- Comercial Rock (rock music)
- Comercial Dance (dance music)
- Comercial by Night (music)
- Comercial One Hit Wonders (music)
- Comercial Portugal (portuguese music)
- Comercial Brasil (brazilian music)
- Comercial 90s (90's music)
- Comercial 2000s (2000's music)
- Comercial Santos Populares (religion music)
- M80 60's (60's music)
- M80 70's (70's music)
- M80 80's (80's music)
- M80 90's (90's music)
- M80 Rock (rock music)
- M80 Ballads (ballads music)
- M80 Pop (pop music)
- M80 Dance (dance music)
- M80 Indie (indie music)
- M80 Portugal (portuguese music)
- M80 Brasil (brazilian music)
- M80 Disco (disco music)
- M80 Soul (soul music)
- M80 Top One (music)
- Cidade Hip Hop (hip-hop music)
- Cidade Latina (latin music)
- Cidade Funk (funk music)
- Smooth FM Vocal Jazz (jazz music)
- Smooth FM Soul (soul music)
- Smooth FM Blues (blues music)
- Smooth FM Bossa Nova (bossa nova music)
- Smooth FM Jazz (jazz music)
- Smooth FM Cool (music)

== Most-listened radio stations ==
Monthly radio audience shares in September 2026:

Position	Station	Group (Owner)	Share of total audience (%)
1	Rádio Comercial	Bauer Media Audio Portugal	25.9%
2	RFM	Grupo Renascença	20.0%
3	Rádio Renascença	Grupo Renascença	9.4%
4	M80 Radio	Bauer Media Audio Portugal	7.9%
5	RTP Antena 1	RTP	4.4%
6	Cidade FM	Bauer Media Audio Portugal	3.7%
7	TSF	Global Media	3.4%
8	Mega Hits	Grupo Renascença	3.3%
9	Rádio NoAr	Jornal da Trofa, Lda.	2.4%
10	Smooth FM	Bauer Media Audio Portugal	1.9%
11	Radio Observador	Observador On Time, S.A.	1.8%
12	RTP Antena 3	RTP	1.4%
13	Rádio Nova Era	Música no Coração	1.3%
14	RTP Antena 2	RTP	0.3%
15	Estação Orbital	Publidifusão Lda	0.3%
Other Radio Stations (national, regional, others)			12.5%

== Defunct radio stations ==
- RCP - Rádio Clube Português (oldies music, news)
- Rádio Sim (oldies music -1970s, 1980s and 1990s, Church services)
- Mix FM (dance music, techno, electro, house)
- Best Rock FM (punk rock, hard rock, alternative rock, pop rock, metal)
- Rádio Capital (news, traffic news, rock)

== See also ==
- Mass media in Portugal
- List of newspapers in Portugal
- Television in Portugal
- Telecommunications in Portugal
