= Sandra Felgueiras =

Portuguese TV presenter and journalist (born 1977)

- Born: 1977 (age 48–49); Porto, Portugal
- Education: NOVA University Lisbon (communication sciences)
- Occupations: Journalist; TV presenter
- Years active: 1999–present
- Employers: RTP (2000–2021); Cofina (2022); TVI / CNN Portugal (2022–present)

Sandra Felgueiras (born 1977) is a Portuguese television presenter and journalist. She worked at RTP from 2000 to 2021, and for nine years coordinated and presented the investigative program Sexta às 9. She covered the disappearance of Madeleine McCann and interviewed the child's parents. After directing the news magazine Sábado for a brief period in 2022, she joined TVI, where she presents the investigative segment Exclusivo. In 2023, she broke the story of the "Luso-Brazilian twins case" and gave evidence to the subsequent parliamentary inquiry in 2025.

== Early life and education ==
Sandra Felgueiras was born in Porto, Portugal, in 1977. Her mother is the politician Fátima Felgueiras. She holds a degree in communication sciences from NOVA University Lisbon.

== Career ==
After a short stint at Barcelona Television in Spain in 1998, Felgueiras interned at SIC and Expresso in 1999. She joined RTP in 2000 and spent 21 years there, nine of them coordinating and presenting the investigative program Sexta às 9 on RTP1. In 2007, she covered the disappearance of Madeleine McCann in the Algarve, Portugal, and interviewed the child's parents, Kate and Gerry McCann. She later appeared in the 2019 Netflix docu-series The Disappearance of Madeleine McCann. Sexta às 9 first aired in 2012. In November 2016, Felgueiras interviewed Pedro Dias, a fugitive later convicted of the Aguiar da Beira killings, for the program. RTP filmed his surrender to the Polícia Judiciária after the interview. She left RTP in November 2021. Her departure was controversial, with journalists in her team accusing the network's news management of cancelling the program without consulting them.

In January 2022, she became the director of the news magazine Sábado, published by Cofina. She also served as deputy editorial director-general, overseeing investigative journalism at Correio da Manhã, CMTV, and Sábado. At Sábado, she launched the program Investigação Sábado, broadcast on CMTV. In May 2022, the magazine Executiva ranked her 20th in its list of the most influential women in Portugal in 2021.

In September 2022, she joined TVI. She presents Exclusivo, an investigative segment on the channel's Jornal Nacional. In November 2023, she broke the story of Luso-Brazilian twin girls with spinal muscular atrophy who had received one of the world's most expensive medicines at Santa Maria Hospital in Lisbon in 2020. She said her investigation examined whether there had been political interference in access to the national health service. On 21 January 2025, she gave evidence to the parliamentary inquiry into the case. She said that President Marcelo Rebelo de Sousa had handled the request for help differently from other such requests he had received.
