= Mobile =

Mobile may refer to:

== Places ==
- Mobile, Alabama, a U.S. port city
- Mobile County, Alabama
- Mobile, Arizona, a small town near Phoenix, U.S.
- Mobile, Newfoundland and Labrador

== Arts, entertainment, and media ==
=== Music ===
==== Groups and labels ====
- Mobile (band), a Canadian rock band
- Mobiles (band), a 1980s British band

==== Other uses in music ====
- Mobile (album), a 1999 album by Brazilian Paulinho Moska
- "Mobile" (song), a 2003 song by Avril Lavigne from Let Go
- "Mobile", a song by Gentle Giant from the album Free Hand

=== Other uses in arts, entertainment, and media ===
- Mobile (sculpture), a kinetic sculpture constructed to take advantage of the principle of equilibrium
- Mobile (TV series), a British ITV drama
- "Mobile", a short story by J. G. Ballard, later renamed "Venus Smiles"
- Mobile, a feature of the game GunBound
- Mobile Magazine, a publication on portable electronics
- TVMobile, a defunct Singaporean television channel
- RTP Mobile, a defunct Portuguese television channel

== Military and law enforcement ==
- Garde Mobile, historic French military unit
- Mobile Brigade Corps (Brimob), the special police force of Indonesia
- Mobile forces, especially:
  - Motorized infantry
  - Mounted infantry
- Operation Mobile, Canadian Forces operations in the 2011 military intervention in Libya

== Science ==
- Motility, the ability to move using metabolic energy
- Motion (physics), the ability to move or be moved

== Technology ==
- Mobile computing, a generic term describing one's ability to use technology in mobile environments
- Mobile device, such as a smartphone, tablet, or computer designed for mobile computing
- Mobile game, a video game played on a mobile phone, smartphone, PDA or handheld computer
- Mobile network operator, a company which provides mobile phone network access and services
- Mobile operating system, the various underlying systems to power and run phones
- Mobile phone, a portable telephone that can make and receive calls
- Mobile radio, wireless communications systems and devices which are based on radio frequencies
- Mobile rig
- Mobile station, user equipment and software needed for communication with a wireless telephone network
- Mobile Web, the World Wide Web as accessed from mobile devices using Mobile Web Browser
- Mobile TV, TV services viewed via a mobile device

== See also ==
- Mabila, a Native American people of Alabama
- Mauvilla (disambiguation)
- Mavilla (disambiguation)
- Mobil, a major oil company
- Mobile station (disambiguation)
- Mobility (disambiguation)
