= Rádio Amália =

- Lisbon; Portugal
- Broadcast area: Lisbon metropolitan area and Porto
- Frequencies: 92.0 MHz (Lisbon); 100.6 MHz (Setúbal); 91.0 MHz (Porto)

Programming
- Format: Fado music

Ownership
- Owner: Música no Coração

History
- First air date: 6 October 2009; 17 years ago

Links
- Webcast: Rádio Radar Webcast
- Website: radarlisboa.fm

Rádio Amália is a Portuguese fado radio station founded in 2009 by Música no Coração, owned by Luís Montez. The station was named after Amália Rodrigues and started broadcasting on the tenth anniversary of her death.

== History ==
Luís Montez had planned a fado radio station in 2001; it took eight years for the license to come true.

Rádio Amália started broadcasting on 92.0 MHz in Lisbon on 6 October 2009. Symbolically, its launch coincided with the tenth anniversary of the death of Amália Rodrigues, its launch day was marked by fourteen live performances from new and established fado singers. In principle, the station was meant to have a target of listeners over the age of 55, but Luís Montez denied these claims and said that, at launch day, a substantial number of listeners at age 35 were listening to the station.

On 23 June 2010, Rádio Amália established a partnership with Rádio Voz de Setúbal, enabling its expansion to the Setúbal region. During its first year, the station became a favorite among taxi drivers.

On 1 October 2024, the station started broadcasting to Porto, replacing Rádio SBSR's local frequency; Medialivre, which had acquired the Lisbon license to set up CM Rádio, acquired Rádio Festival to cover the Porto area.

== See also ==
- List of radio stations in Portugal
