= RTP Antena 1 =

Portuguese radio station

- Portugal
- Frequencies: 87.7 – 106.7 MHz, 630 - 1287 kHz

Programming
- Format: Full-Service, AC

Ownership
- Owner: Rádio e Televisão de Portugal

History
- First air date: 4 August 1935
- Former names: Emissora Nacional Programa 1 (1935–1975); RDP Programa 1 (1976–1981)

Technical information
- Transmitter coordinates: 38.75966294°N 9.11785305°W

Links
- Webcast: RTP Play
- Website: www.rtp.pt/antena1/

Antena 1's eighth and previous logo from 2004 to 2016

Antena 1's ninth and previous logo from 2016 to 2026

RTP Antena 1 is one of the three national radio channels produced by the Portuguese public broadcasting entity Rádio e Televisão de Portugal, the others being RTP Antena 2 and RTP Antena 3.

Antena 1 has a generalist programming policy focusing mainly on news, current affairs and sport, as well as the discussion of contemporary social issues. Musically, Antena 1 is an AC station with a strong emphasis on Portuguese popular music.

The Macanese radio and television company Teledifusão de Macau relays Antena 1's programmes overnight between 20.00 and 7.00 (8.00 on Saturdays and Sundays) Beijing Time (UTC+8).

In December 2019, it had a weekly reach share of 10.9%.

== History ==
=== 1930s ===
In 1930, the Radioelectricity Council was created, which led to the interest of the government in establishing its own radio station. In November 1931, a project was approved for the establishment of Emissora Nacional de Radiodifusão. Test broadcasts started in the spring of 1932, later from August 1933, a one-year trial period began, in order to solidify its technical body. Official broadcasts did not start until 1 August 1935, with its inauguration, even though its official founding was on 4 August. Its initial facilities were located at Rua do Quelhas, number 2.

In its early years, Emissora Nacional was not under the direct control of the National Propaganda Service, but was dependent on the Ministry of Public Work and Communications. Unlike other European dictatorships at the time, Salazar did not have the same motivation as his counterparts to mobilize masses over the radio with his ideologies. Its first director, Henrique Galvão, was appointed by Salazar in June 1934, before regular broadcasts started.

Upon its founding in 1935, Emissora Nacional broadcast nine hours a day, during the lunch, late afternoon and evening periods. Content included music (especially recorded music, given the cuts to orchestras), talks (aligned with the views of the regime), children's programs, readings, rural propaganda, "on this day"-style ephemera, stock prices, the government's briefing, newspaper headlines (even though news was not a central pillar) and women's interest programs. The station was aligned with the five pillars of the government's viewpoint: God, Homeland, Authority, Family and Work. There were plans to begin shortwave broadcasts in order to reach all overseas colonies, but the government did not invest in a transmitter for that end. Instead, it opted for a 5KW transmitter built by its staff, which was put into service in 1936. The following year, the number of shortwave hours increased, with the arrival of Meia-Hora da Saudade, aimed at the diaspora. The program's success led to its doubling in length in 1939, becoming A Hora da Saudade, with at least four separate editions catering separate beams: Africa, Africa and Asia, Brazil and North America. There was, however, criticism on the excess in talk-related programming and classical music. This led to a restructuring of its nine orchestras in 1938, which enabled the playing of a wider range of music styles.

Football broadcasts started in 1938, but was seen with concern from FPF, who thought that the mere broadcast of a match between Sporting and Benfica would lure listeners away from stadiums. The ban was lifted in 1940, due to government intervention. Still in 1938, EN made its first overseas coverage, of the Portuguese national football team playing against the German and Swiss counterparts. Throughout October, the station delivered programs to incite listeners to vote for the National Assembly elections, where Salazar pledged to maintain its neutrality facing a possible international conflict.

=== 1940s ===
During World War II, messages of "conformism" were broadcast in order to maintain order and belief in the national pillars. EN and the National Propaganda Service had frequent exchanges with German radio under Nazi occupation. Its Portuguese service could be heard in the Portuguese mainland and its colonies; however, the BBC's similar service could be heard well with a considerable impact. An organic law was passed on 14 September 1940, with the need of developing a National Broadcasting Plan (Plano Nacional de Radiodifusão). It now had a 20KW medium wave transmitter and a 10KW shortwave transmitter, the latter being homemade, like its predecessor. The plan involved the installation of more powerful transmitters (a 50KW national transmitter, a 40KW imperial shortwave transmitter and two relay transmitters in Porto and Coimbra). EN's staff grew in the 1940s: by 1949, its staff was of 600 against 30 in 1935. Its continued support of the national values continued well into the 1940s, with the state propaganda exhalting the 800th anniversary of the state of Portugal and the 300th of the restoration of its independence and the founding of the National Stadium at Jamor on 10 June 1944 being two key events. Afonso Ferro was appointed its director on 26 May 1941, where he suggested a new lightweight programming model giving more prevalence to light entertainment, as well as increasing the amount of Portuguese music played. Two new transmitters were installed (a medium wave one and a shortwave one), in Barcarena and Castanheira do Ribatejo, following the February 1941 cyclone, while on 26 May, the Azorean station opened. In the case of Castanheira do Ribatejo, the 1935 transmitter was replaced in 1945. A regional studio for Porto started in 1943, alongside its transmitter. The Overseas Broadcasting Center (Centro Emissor Ultramarino) was created in 1948 to include 22 stations from the Far East to Newfoundland, two 100KW transmitters and its respective set of buildings. In 1949, the ninth transmitter in Faro opened.

=== 1950s ===
In the 1950s, while its other European counterparts were already including democratic elements, EN was still following the model of a state radio station. This coincided with the golden age of Portuguese radio. Official broadcasts for Macao, Timor, Goa, Daman and Diu started in early 1951; the death of Marshall Carmona on 18 April led to a cut in its airtime due to national mourning and the airing of his funeral. In April 1952, new facilities for Coimbra were built, accompanied by a new transmitter, as well as the building of a transmitter in Viseu.

FM broadcasts in Lisbon and Porto began in 1955. In 1956, its programs stopped carrying 78 rpm discs. Faced with the prospect of the start of television, EN was planning its new headquarters. The hours with more listeners were the Sunday sports broadcasts, normally from 15:00 to 17:00, when the football matches were aired, and on weekdays between 21:00 and 22:00.

=== 1960s ===
Following the exit of Eça de Queirós from its directorate in 1959, the post was taken over by Jaime Ferreira, where he remained until 1963. One of his moves was the abolition of the afternoon break, delivering a continuous 17-hour schedule from 07:00 to 00:00 and increasing its dependence on music. On 25 November 1960, Rádio-Escolar began, airing two times a week. In 1964, the effects of the new schedule had a good impact on its listeners: the hours with more listeners on weekdays were 07:00 to 10:00, 12:00 to 14:30 and 19:00 to 21:30, and on Sundays, from 14:00 to 20:00. In the early 60s, the two EN stations broadcast the most news bulletins, delivering its official stance of the Overseas War. Solari Allegro replaced Jaime Ferreira, even though she did not start her official career in 1964. The aim was to increase propaganda during the war. 1967 was marked by the move of Rádio Universidade (created in 1950) from the second network to the first network.

=== 1968-1974: last years of the New State and Marcelist Spring ===
Emissora Nacional's team carried the demonstrations held by students against the regime on 17 April 1969, but the recordings were not publicly released until the fall of the New State. In 1968, some of its news bulletins were preceded by Notas do Dia, from the head of EN's news division, which mainly concerned Portugal's internal and external policy with its overseas colonies. The National Assembly elections of October 1969 were faced with mass adversity. When Marcelo Caetano was elected ANP president, the note for 23 February 1970 gave the notion that Portugal would follow two paths: that of "maintaining order and progress" or "anarchy and subversion".

FM stereo broadcasts began on 14 March 1968, with an opera from Teatro Nacional São Carlos. The penetration of television (even with weak programming) hampered radio's success during primetime hours. The success of foreign music, especially on Rádio Clube Português and Rádio Renascença, was left out by Emissora Nacional, which remained with its own mindset. Its microphones shared the top names of Portuguese radio with the top names of Portuguese music. Like what happened throughout the 1960s, EN was facing stagnation. In 1969, under the control of Carlos Silva Gonçalves, Lisboa 1 started broadcasting 24 hours a day.

When Salazar died in July 1970, social pressure and inflation emerged. This also affected Emissora Nacional's finances. Around this time, Emissora Nacional aimed more towards entertainment. A new time server was installed in August 1973, giving more precision for its time signal.

=== Effects of 25 April ===
Emissora Nacional did not have a central role in the Carnation Revolution of 25 April 1974, but rather in the early events of PREC. The facilities were occupied overnight, and was later occupied by the Armed Forces Movement. When EN resumed its broadcasts, there was massive confusion, censorship practices ended and the station started experiencing massive changes. An ad-hoc military directorate was put into place from 28 April to 29 May, when it was given to Lieutenant-Colonel José Calvão Borges, and, from 2 January 1975, Lieutenant-Colonel Raul Martins. The opening of Portuguese society gave EN pressure from ideological factions, in order to control the company's orientation. Around this time, the 13:00 and 20:00 news bulletins started lasting for one hour. On 25 November 1975, the day of the failed coup attempt, EN, like RTP, broadcast from Porto.

On 2 December 1975, Rádiodifusão Portuguesa (RDP) was created from the forced nationalization of several private radio stations. Most of the "revolutionary" and "reactionary" staff left under the new directives. The new RDP name appeared in February 1976. The former main Emissora Nacional station was renamed Programa 1. It was RDP's most listened-to radio station, reporting 2,582,000 listeners. 40% of its line-up consisted of Portuguese music.

=== 1980s ===
Antena 1 (name adopted in 1981) restored commercial advertising in 1982, alongside its shortwave counterpart, with a maximum length of six minutes per hour. However, the goal was not profit, but rather social benefits, according to the regulations. The agreement that led to Portugal and Spain's entrance in the European Economic Community on 12 June 1985 was marked by a special broadcast shared with Radio Nacional de España. The international correspondent network begins to solidify, as well as making its news operation a pillar of the network. The sports news unit was improved. All major events were covered by Antena 1 at this phase.

In 1983, a medium wave output started carrying a four-hour opt-out service airing music instead of football matches. A relevant change to its schedule took place in 1984, with the aim of reverting the decrease in ratings it suffered since the start of the decade, with the increase of the ratings of Rádio Comercial and Rádio Renascença. In 1987, the medium wave station started carrying generalist programming, while the FM station prioritized musical programming, given its stereo capabilities. It was also the year of the first Pirilampo Mágico campaign in association with FENACERCI, which aims to help children with disabilities.

=== 1990s ===
Commercial advertising was last broadcast by Antena 1 on 31 December 1992, due to the privatization of Rádio Comercial and the restructuring of RDP. In order to distance itself from the competition, the station adopted RDP 1 as its new name. In June 1993, the AM and FM networks began airing eight hours of separate programming. In 1994, the former name (Antena 1) was restored. Still in 1994, a traffic line for listeners opened. In 1996, the amount of news-related content, especially in the morning program (07:00 to 10:00) increased.

=== 2000s ===
Its journalist José Manuel Rosende was detained in Cizre during its coverage of the Iraq War.

=== 2020s ===
On 30 March 2026, the station has been renamed RTP Antena 1 after the adoption of a single branding strategy on 18 February 2026. The rebranding was designed by Ivity Brand Corp, a Portuguese design agency responsible for RTP corporate rebrand.

== Radio stations ==
=== MW ===
- Bragança 666 kHz
- Castelo Branco District 720 kHz
- CEN 666 kHz
- Coimbra 630 kHz
- Covilhã 666 kHz
- Elvas 720 kHz
- Guarda 720 kHz
- Lamego 756 kHz
- Miranda do Douro 630 kHz
- Mirandela 720 kHz
- Monte das Cruzes (Azores) 828 kHz
- Portalegre 1287 kHz
- Valença 666 kHz
- Vila Real 666 kHz
- Viseu 666 kHz

=== FM ===
==== Mainland ====
- Alcoutim 88.9
- Arestal 106.7
- Banática 99.4
- Bornes 92.8
- Braga 91.3
- Bragança 96.4
- Castelo Branco 89.9
- Coimbra 94.9
- Elvas 103.8
- Faro 97.6
- Gardunha 96.4
- Grândola 99.2
- Gravia 104.5
- Guarda 94.7
- Janas 96.9
- Leiria 98.7
- Lousã 87.9
- Manteigas 104.8
- Marão 95.2
- Marofa 97.2
- Mendro 87.7
- Mértola 90.9
- Minhéu 94.9
- Miranda do Douro 90.3
- Moledo 102.9
- Monchique 88.9
- Monsanto 95.7
- Montargil 93.6
- Monte da Virgem 96.7
- Montejunto 98.3
- Muro 88.3
- Paredes de Coura 102.9
- Portalegre 97.9
- Rendufe 89.2
- S.Domingos 87.9
- Santarém 98.8
- Serra de Ossa 88.4
- Tróia 106.7
- Valença 98.2
- Viseu 88.2

==== Azores ====
- Arrife 94.5
- Cabeço Gordo 88.9
- Cabeço Verde 98.1
- Cascalho Negro 92.2
- Espalamaca 93.8
- Fajãzinha 100.4
- Furnas 93.6
- Lajes das Flores 102.6
- Lajes do Pico 96.5
- Macela 87.6
- Monte das Cruzes 99.8
- Morro Alto 93.5
- Nordeste 104.6
- Nordestinho 103.7
- Pico Alto Sta. Maria 96.7
- Pico Bartolomeu 92.7
- Pico da Barrosa 97.9
- Pico das Éguas 89.5
- Pico do Geraldo 103.7
- Pico do Jardim 97.0
- Ponta Delgada 94.1
- Ponta Ruiva 87.6
- Povoação 102.8
- S. Mateus 103.4
- Serra do Cume 99.7
- Sta. Bárbara 90.5

==== Madeira ====
- Achadas da Cruz 104.3
- Cabo Girão 96.7
- Calheta 105.4
- Caniço 101.6
- Encumeada 93.1
- Funchal (Monte) 104.6
- Gaula 98.5
- Maçapez 92.0
- Paúl da Serra 101.9
- Pico do Areeiro 95.5
- Pico do Facho 93.1
- Ponta do Pargo 90.2
- Porto Santo 100.5
- Ribeira Brava105.6
- Santa Clara 104.6

==== East Timor ====
- Dili 103.1

== See also ==
- List of radio stations in Portugal
- RTP Antena 1 Açores
- RTP Antena 1 Madeira
- RTP Lusitânia
