= RTP Antena 3 =

Portuguese public broadcasting radio station

- Portugal
- Broadcast area: Portugal - National FM
- Frequencies: 92.3 – 107.9 MHz (mainland Portugal)

Programming
- Format: Talk, contemporary music

Ownership
- Owner: Rádio e Televisão de Portugal

History
- First air date: 26 April 1994; 32 years ago

Technical information
- Transmitter coordinates: 38.75966294°N 9.11785305°W

Links
- Webcast: RTP Play
- Website: www.rtp.pt/antena3

RTP Antena 3 is one of the three national radio channels produced by the Portuguese public broadcasting entity Rádio e Televisão de Portugal, the others being RTP Antena 1 and RTP Antena 2. Inaugurated on 26 April 1994, RTP Antena 3 is distinguished by its promotion of new Portuguese music. The station has discovered and promoted some of the most important contemporary Portuguese bands.

The channel specializes in contemporary and alternative music, focusing on showcasing new artists, and features live concerts, news and chart countdown programmes.

== History ==
Antena 3 logo from 2004 to 2016.

Antena 3 originated from the 1985 attribution of a third national FM network; however it took until the privatization of Rádio Comercial in 1993 to materialize.

Early plans included a service similar to TSF, which eventually became Antena 1's format. The aim was to recoup audiences lost to Rádio Renascença and Correio da Manhã Rádio. RDP also owned local stations, but the end of advertising on RDP at the end of 1992 hurt their income. This caused RDP to use some of its frequencies as a potential target for Antena 3.

Test broadcasts of the new station, the stop-gap service RDP FM, began in June 1993 on two frequencies, one in Lisbon and one in Porto, being followed by a third one in Braga. When RDP's administration changed in early 1994, plans to make an official launch for the station were underway.

Gradually, during the summer of 1994, its nationwide reach expanded, with the station receiving 60% of RDP's audience. A protocol with MTV gave exclusive access to concerts and interviews with international stars. It also covered events ignored by like-minded radio stations, such as U2's first post-war concert in Sarajevo in 1997. For a while in 1999, with the escalation of violence in Timor, the station dedicated one third of its programming to mobilize its listeners for the Timorese cause. In 2001, with the appearance of Mega FM and with the growth of Rádio Comercial and RFM, the station was suffering from a decrease in its ratings, causing a new directorate to change its format.

Antena 3 logo from 2016 to 29 March 2026.

In 2015, the station was rebranded as "the entrance door of pop culture in the RTP universe". Over the years, Antena 3 has been controlled by Jorge Alexandre Lopes, Luís Montez, José Mariño, Rui Pêgo and (currently) Nuno Reis.

In December 2019, it had a weekly reach share of 5.7%.

On 30 March 2026, the station has been renamed RTP Antena 3 after the adoption of a single branding strategy on 18 February 2026. The rebranding was designed by Ivity Brand Corp, a Portuguese design agency responsible for RTP corporate rebrand.

== The Team ==
Some of the house names are:

- Álvaro Costa (One of the biggest names in Portuguese radio)
- Ana Galvão
- António Freitas (Metal presenter of "Alta Tensão")
- Augusto Seabra
- Catarina Limão
- DJ Vibe (weekend nights DJ)
- Família Fazuma (Reggae presenter "Música Enrolada")
- Fernando Alvim (Presenter of "Prova Oral")
- Henrique Amaro (One of the biggest specialists in Portuguese music producer of programs like "100%" e "Portugália")
- João Moreira (under the pseudonym/character Bruno Aleixo, along with his "friends", who present humorous skits in two programs titled "Aleixo FM" and "Aleixo Amigo")
- José Paulo Alcobia (Cinema critic)
- Luís Oliveira
- Miguel Quintão (With Álvaro Costa presents "Bons Rapazes")
- Mónica Mendes (The voice of M and many TV advertisements, never showing her face)
- Nuno Calado (Disciple of António Sérgio, author of "Clandestino" and "Indigente")
- Nuno Reis (Author "Caixa de Ritmos")
- Paulo Castelo ("the traffic boy")
- Pedro Costa (author of "Coyote")
- Raquel Bulha (author of "Planeta 3", "Terra à Vista", "Borda d'água" and presenter of "Hora do Sexo" with the psychologist Quintino Aires)
- Ricardo Sérgio (The news men of "info-3" and summer festivals, also music critic on the newspaper diary "DN" and magazine "Op")
- Rui Estêvão
- Rui Miguel Abreu (author of "Nação Hip-Hop" and founder of the record label Loop Recordings)
- Rui Vargas (Lux DJ, Friday nights on Antena 3)

== See also ==
- List of radio stations in Portugal
- RTP Antena 3 Madeira
