= Loureiro =

Loureiro may refer to:

== People ==
- Artur Loureiro (1853–1932), Portuguese painter
- Bruno Loureiro (born 1989), Portuguese footballer
- Claudio Loureiro, Brazilian advertising executive and entrepreneur
- Cleber Santana Loureiro (1981–2016), Brazilian footballer
- Daniel Pedrosa Loureiro (born 1996), Spanish footballer
- Fábio de Souza Loureiro (born 1980), Brazilian footballer
- Felipe Jorge Loureiro (born 1977), Brazilian football player and coach
- João de Loureiro (1717–1791), Portuguese Jesuit missionary and botanist
- João Loureiro (born 1963), Portuguese football administrator
- José Jorge Loureiro (1791–1860), Portuguese soldier and politician
- Kiko Loureiro (born 1972), Brazilian guitarist
- Lino Sousa Loureiro, 2025 Mulhouse stabbing attack victim
- Luís Loureiro (born 1976), Portuguese football player and coach
- Luís Miguel Loureiro, Portuguese television journalist
- Manel Loureiro, Spanish author
- Miguel Loureiro (born 1996), Spanish footballer
- Nuno Loureiro (1977-2025), Portuguese plasma physicist
- Oswaldo Loureiro (1932–2018), Brazilian film and television actor
- Valentim Loureiro (born 1938), Portuguese politician, football chairman
- Javier Loureiro (born 2003), Spanish software engineer

== Places ==
- Loureiro, a civil parish in the municipality of Oliveira de Azeméis, Portugal
- Loureiro, a civil parish in the municipality of Peso da Régua, Portugal

== Other ==
- Loureiro (grape), a grape variety
