= Pirilampo Mágico =

Portuguese charity campaign

- Industry: Solidarity campaign
- Founded: May 10, 1987 (39 years ago)
- Area served: Portugal
- Products: Pirilampos Mágicos; Lapel pins T-shirts; Mugs; Teacups; Bags; Vinyl records
- Parent: Fenacerci
- Website: fenacerci.pt/pirilampo-magico

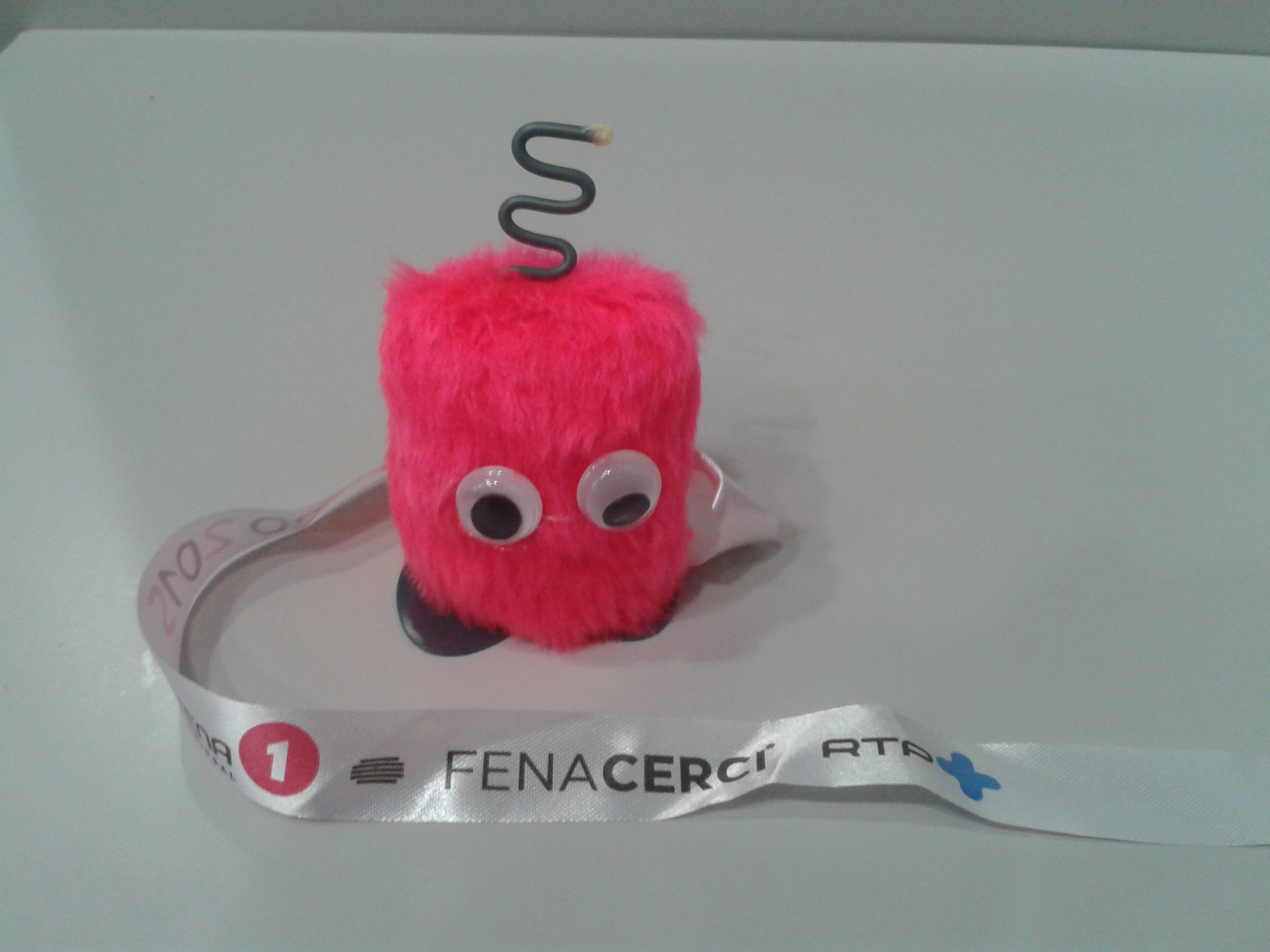
Pirilampo Mágico 2015

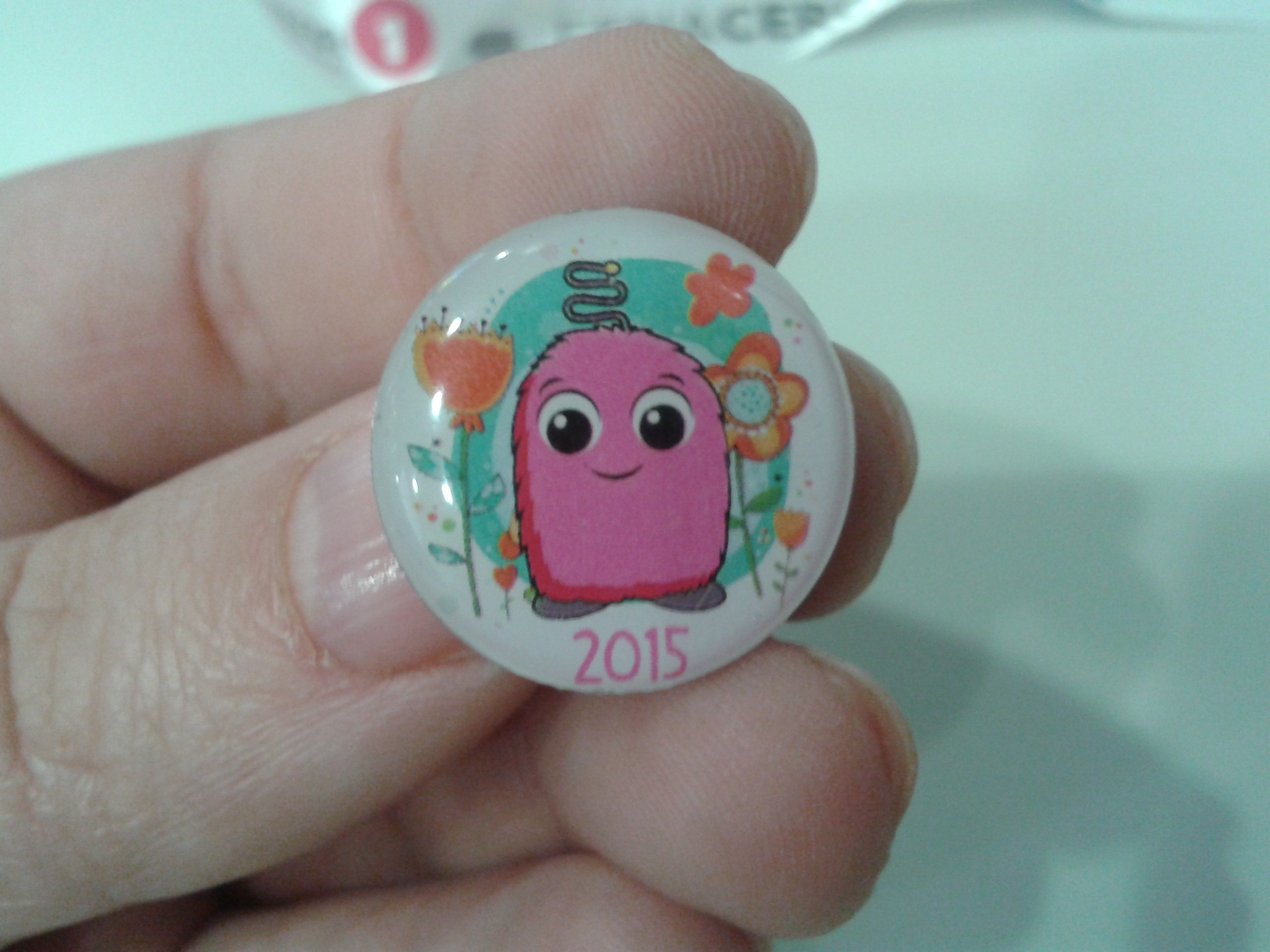
Pirilampo Mágico 2015 lapel pin

Pirilampo Mágico (English: "Magic Firefly") is a Portuguese annual charity campaign, aimed at raising funds for the CERCI cooperatives that support children with Intellectual disability and economic hardship. This campaign has taken place every year in May since 1987. As a means of fundraising, stuffed toys representing fireflies are sold. In 2012, the campaign celebrated its 25th anniversary. Up to 2012, approximately 16.5 million euros were raised.

== History ==
The doll was conceived by the graphic designer Mário Jorge Fernandes, then working at Radiodifusão Portuguesa. At a time when the CERCI were facing financial difficulties, Jaime Calado, then president of CERCI Lisboa, took part in the radio program "A Arte de Bem Madrugar" on Antena 1, where journalist José Manuel Nunes mentioned a national charity campaign in the United Kingdom "associated with a friendly creature". As a result, the idea emerged to design a campaign that would create "a symbol that appealed to a childlike dimension of charity, but that had some meaning" with the keywords "magic", "solidarity" and "light", according to Rogério Cação, vice-president of the Federação Nacional de Cooperativas de Solidariedade Social.

In 1999 along with the traditional Pirilampo Mágico, a female version known as "Miss Pirilampo Mágico", in a different colour and featuring a paper bow, was sold. The following year, the miss was sold again, but with a fabric bow. There have been no further editions in which two different pirilampos were sold.

In 2018 the Pirilampo Mágico campaign faced delays due to changes in the manufacturing of the pirilampos, which began to be made of rubber. Consequently, a second sales phase was held in October for the first time. The following year, the design of the rubber pirilampos was updated.

In 2020 the campaign was postponed due to the COVID-19 pandemic. The pirilampos were produced but were only sold in October 2021, although they were dated 2020. The 2022 campaign also took place in October and, for accounting purposes, the pirilampos from that year are dated 2021/22. It was only in 2023 that the campaign returned to being held in May.

=== Sales ===
In the first edition about 92,000 pirilampos mágicos were sold; in 2012, around 800,000 were sold, and in 1995 and 2000 sales exceeded 1 million. From the first campaign until that of 2019, a total of 23,264,139 pirilampos were sold.

== Editions ==
#	Year	Body	Feet and Antenna	Sponsorship	Price
1st	1987	Blue-green	Black	Antena1, Cerci's	
2nd	1988	Yellow-orange	Black	Antena1, Cerci's	
3rd	1989	Dark purple	Black	Antena1, Cerci's	
4th	1990	Fuchsia pink	Black	Antena1, Cerci's	
5th	1991	Yellow	Black	Antena1, Fenacerci	
6th	1992	Blue	Black	Antena1, Fenacerci	300$
7th	1993	White	Black	RDP1, Fenacerci	
8th	1994	Red	Black	Antena1, Fenacerci	
9th	1995	Light blue	Black	Antena1, Fenacerci	300$
10th	1996	Green	Black	RDP Antena1, Fenacerci	300$
11th	1997	Black	Yellow (antenna) Red (feet)	RDP Antena1, Fenacerci	300$
12th	1998	Dark blue	White (antenna) Yellow (feet)	RDP Antena1, Fenacerci	
13th	1999	Pink Dark blue (miss)	Dark blue White (antenna) Yellow (feet and bow)	RDP Antena1, Fenacerci	350$
14th	2000	Gray Dark gray (miss)	Dark blue Red (antenna, feet and bow)	RDP Antena1, Fenacerci	
15th	2001	Bright orange	Black	RDP Antena1, Fenacerci	
16th	2002	Dry orange	Black	RDP Antena1, Fenacerci	2€
17th	2003	Dark green	Yellow	RDP Antena1, Fenacerci	2€
18th	2004	Dark green (front) Red (back)	Yellow	Antena1, Fenacerci	2€
19th	2005	Dark blue (front) Fuchsia pink (back)	Yellow	Antena1, Fenacerci	2€
20th	2006	Dark red (main) Golden (secondary)	Yellow	Antena1, Fenacerci	2€
21st	2007	Yellow (main) Golden (secondary)	Yellow	Antena1, Fenacerci	2€
22nd	2008	Light green	Sky blue	Antena1, Fenacerci	2€
23rd	2009	Purple	Yellow	Antena1, Fenacerci	2€
24th	2010	Salmon	Red	Antena1, Fenacerci	2€
25th	2011	White (main) Silver (secondary)	Black	Antena1, Fenacerci	2€
26th	2012	Sky blue	Brown	Antena1, Fenacerci	2€
27th	2013	Turquoise	Dark blue	Antena1, Fenacerci	2€
28th	2014	Lilac	Dark purple	Antena1, Fenacerci	2€
29th	2015	Vivid pink	Dark gray	Antena1, Fenacerci, RTP+	2€
30th	2016	Lettuce green	Gray	Antena1, Fenacerci, RTP+	2€
31st	2017	Roasted yellow (front) Dark blue (back)	Dark blue	Antena1, Fenacerci, RTP+	2€
32nd	2018	Light blue-green (top) Dark blue-green (bottom)	Dark blue-green (antenna) White (feet)	Fenacerci, Antena1, RTP+	2€
33rd	2019	Roasted yellow (top) Orange (bottom)	Orange	Fenacerci, Antena1, RTP+	2€
34th	2021	Red	Red	Fenacerci, Antena1, RTP+	2€
35th	2022	Dark blue	Dark blue	Fenacerci, Antena1, RTP+	2€
36th	2023	Green	Green	Fenacerci, Antena1, RTP+	2€
37th	2024	Yellow (top) White (bottom)	White	Fenacerci, Antena1, RTP+	2.20€
38th	2025	Purple (top) Violet (bottom)	Violet	Fenacerci, Antena1, RTP+	2.50€
39th	2026	Light brown (top) Dark brown (bottom)	Dark brown	Fenacerci, Antena1, RTP+	2,50€

== Music ==
- 1993 – Pirilampo Mágico 93 (CD, SPA, 4 tracks) also includes themes from 1991, 1992 and an instrumental from 1993.
  Guest artists: Adelaide Ferreira, Ministars, Onda Choc, Popeline, Sandra & João.
- 1999 – Pirilampo Mágico 99 (CD, EMI – Valentim de Carvalho, 2 tracks) includes "O Pirilampo Mágico" and "Pirilampo rap".
  Guest artists: Carlos Ramon (autor), Pedro Magalhães, João Canto e Castro, António Machado, Miguel Velez.
- 2006 – Hino do Pirilampo Mágico 2006 (CD) (20 anos do Pirilampo Mágico)
  Guest artists: Maria Ana Bobone (interpretação), Alexandre Honrado (letra) and Zé da Ponte (música e direcção).
