= Lusitânia =

Lusitânia may refer to:

- Lusitânia, Portuguese name of Lusitania, an ancient Iberian Roman province located where modern Portugal and part of western Spain lie.
- Lusitânia, proper name of star HD 45652, in the constellation of Monoceros.
- RTP Lusitânia, a Portuguese radio station
