= Rádio Sim =

- Portugal

Programming
- Format: Oldies

Ownership
- Owner: Rádio Renascença Multimédia
- Sister stations: Rádio Renascença; RFM; Mega Hits

History
- First air date: 4 August 2008

Rádio Sim was a Portuguese music radio station owned by Rádio Renascença Multimédia. The station played old music and fado, aiming at a senior age range. Broadcasts started on 8 August 2008, replacing the former Renascença regional stations established in the 1980s. Its closure was announced in 2020, leading to the end of all production and operating under a skeleton service until 2021, when it closed down for good.

== History ==
Rádio Sim started broadcasting on 4 August 2008 as the group's fourth radio station. In addition to the airing of vintage music, it also aired the 6:30pm rosary and the special rosary on the first Saturday of each month at 9pm. It also relayed Renascença's news bulletins, the editions of sports news program Bola Branca and some of its football matches. The station, however, did not have its formal presentation until 1 October, with a special event at Casa do Artista in Lisbon. One of the launch programs, Luso Fonias, received collaborations from like-minded Catholic radio stations in Lusophone countries.

In November 2011, the network began broadcasting to Viseu upon taking over Rádio Noar's license.

On 3 January 2020, Rádio Sim announced the immediate cessation of new programming as the group noted that the network did not find financial sustainability after eleven years, while reframing the target audience to content on Rádio Renascença. This quickly gained the attention of the Archbishop of Braga, who thought that its closure would lead to the downsizing of the Catholic Church's presence on national radio.

The remains of the network were acquired by Radio Maria, who launched the Portuguese version on 13 May 2021, bringing an end to Rádio Sim.
