= Rádio Fóia =

Monchique; Portugal
- Frequency: 97.1 MHz

Programming
- Format: Portuguese music

History
- First air date: 30 March 1989; 36 years ago
- Last air date: 22 July 2024; 18 months ago (after 35 years, 114 days)

Rádio Fóia was a local radio station in Monchique, broadcasting from Fóia, the highest point of Algarve in southern Portugal, broadcasting on 97.1 FM with an ERP of 500W. The station was shut down in 2024 and replaced by a relay of Mega Hits.

== History ==
The station started broadcasting on 30 March 1989, at a time where local radio stations in Portugal were being legalized. On 14 April 2009, the station's license was renewed for a further ten years.

In early July 2024, Rádio Fóia announced that the station would be replaced by a relay of Rádio Renascença Multimédia's youth network Mega Hits, with effect from 22 July. The ERC license demanded that the remaining elements of the Rádio Fóia CRL team would produce three daily news bulletins (11am, 3pm, 9pm) opting out from the national service. The request was submitted to ERC on 6 September 2023 and received the green light ten months later. The new tenant has a different musical profile than Fóia, which specialized primarily in Portuguese popular music, like what most local radio stations did. Paulo Rosa, director of the station, believed that the station "didn't die and won't die", and that the decision was taken to ease the financial burden, with the possibility of restarting its operations soon.

Shortly after midnight on 22 July 2024, the station shut down and handed over to Mega Hits.
