= Antena 1 Madeira =

RTP Antena 1 Madeira
- Portugal
- Broadcast area: Madeira - FM
- Frequency: 90.2 MHz

Programming
- Format: Full-Service, AC

Ownership
- Owner: Rádio e Televisão de Portugal

History
- First air date: 22 October 1967; 58 years ago
- Former names: Antena 1 Madeira (1996-2026)

Links
- Webcast: RTP Play
- Website: madeira.rtp.pt

RTP Antena 1 Madeira is a radio station owned by Rádio e Televisão de Portugal catering Madeira. The station has heavy amounts of local programming, supplemented by relays from the mainland station. Antena 3 has a local station; Antena 2 is relayed from Lisbon.

== History ==
The station started broadcasting on 22 October 1967, 26 years after the Azores, as Emissor Regional da Madeira. The station competed with two private stations that emerged before: Posto Emissor de Radiodifusão do Funchal and Rádio Madeira. Like what happened in the Azores, the station had independent programming, on AM and later also FM.

The line-up of the first day featured:

- 12:00 - opening note from the president of Emissora Nacional's directive
- 12.05 - Escolha uma Canção
- 13:00 - Diário Sonoro
- 13:30 - Vamos Ouvir o Trio Odemira
- 13:52 - Football: fifth matchweek of the national championship
- 17:10 - Onda Musica
- 18:10 - História que os Portugueses não Devem Esquecer
- 18:45 - Festival 67
- 19:30 - Acro-íris
- 20:05 - ballet music
- 20:30 - Diário Sonoro
- 21:00 - Noite de Teatro, with an staging of Almeida Garrett's play Frei Luís de Sousa
- at closing - news summary and closedown.

The base transmitter was finished a few months later, and only after that, the 10 kilowatt medium wave transmitter and the FM transmitter were operational.

In 1982, technical improvements were conducted, like the mainland.

On 29 May 1994, the station started broadcasting Saudades da Madeira, later renamed Abraço da Madeira, alongside RDP Internacional, to cater to the Madeiran diaspora. Originally a one-hour program, it doubled its length to two hours in 2001.

In 2013, it made its first broadcast from the Desertas Islands.

== See also ==
- List of radio stations in Portugal
