= Antena 1 Açores =

RTP Antena 1 Açores
- Portugal
- Broadcast area: Azores - FM
- Frequency: 99.8 MHz

Programming
- Format: Full-Service, AC

Ownership
- Owner: Rádio e Televisão de Portugal

History
- First air date: 26 May 1941; 84 years ago
- Former names: Antena 1 Açores (1996–2026)

Links
- Webcast: RTP Play
- Website: acores.rtp.pt

RTP Antena 1 Açores is a radio station owned by Rádio e Televisão de Portugal catering the Azores. The station has heavy amounts of local programming, supplemented by relays from the mainland station.

== History ==
The station started broadcasting on 26 May 1941. During the old regime, the station competed with Clube Asas do Atlântico, Rádio Clube de Angra and the AFRTS station in Lajes. When Emissora Nacional was nationalized, the decision only affected its Azorean station, not the competitors.

In 1984, the station increased the quality of its coverage and added programs from other Azorean islands. In 1996, it increased its microwave FM network, while on April 7, 1998, it moved to new, purpose-built facilities. As of 2000, it was the only radio station available in Flores.

== See also ==
- List of radio stations in Portugal
