= Telecommunications in Portugal =

Portugal has a modern and flexible telecommunications market and a wide range of varied media organisations. The regulatory body overseeing communications is called ANACOM.

The country has one of the highest mobile phone penetration rates in the world (the number of operative mobile phones already exceeds the population). This network also provides wireless mobile Internet connections as well, and covers the entire territory. As of 2023, 94% of households had high-speed Internet services and 97% of companies had Internet access. Most Portuguese watch television through fibre-optic (2023: 66.2% of households). Paid Internet connections are available at many cafés, as well as many post offices. One can also surf on the Internet at hotels, conference centres and shopping centres, where special areas are reserved for this purpose. Free Internet access is also available to Portuguese residents at "Espaços de Internet" across the country.

== Broadband overview ==
Portugal has a mid-sized but advanced telecoms market, with a steadily growing broadband subscriber base well served by cable, DSL and the emerging FTTx platforms. Mobile penetration is far above the European Union average, while the development of digital TV services has progressed under cautious regulatory guidance. The progressive liberalisation of the Portuguese market began at the beginning of the 1990s through the creation of the Portuguese Institute for Communications (ICP). Through a combination of specific deadlines for liberalisation and entry mechanisms for new market players, Portugal's telecoms scene was successfully opened up to competition. The country's broadband market showed accelerated growth in 2010 not least due to its widespread cable and DSL networks, but also due to aggressive fibre deployment. Broadband services with up to 100 Mbit/s, 200 Mbit/s and even 1 Gbit/s speeds were launched in 2009. The country's leading telecom operators have partnered up to build high speed next generation networks. The government's broadband initiative for 2009-2010 had the following two aims: (i) the connection of up to 1.5 million homes and businesses to the new fibre networks enabling them to benefit from improvements in high-speed Internet, TV and voice services; (ii) the achievement of 50 per cent broadband penetration among households by 2010. Both aims were reached. At the end of 2023, the number of households connected to the fibre-optic networks (FTTH/B) by all operators stood at 3.24 million. The number of households with access by cable totalled 1.3 million. Nearly the totality of family households now have access to at least one high-speed network.

Telephones - main lines in use: 5.5 million (2024)

Telephones - mobile cellular: 13.6 million (2023) Cell Networks(2G/3G/3.5G/4G): MEO - (2G to 4G licence); UZO (Virtual Carrier, owned by MEO); Moche (Virtual Carrier, runs under MEO prefix); Vodafone (2G to 4G licence); Yorn (Virtual Carrier, runs under Vodafone prefix); NOS (2G to 4G licence); WTF (Virtual Carrier, runs under NOS prefix); Phone-ix (Virtual carrier owned by CTT and operated by the MEO network) and Continente Mobile (operated by Optimus and hypermarket chain, Continente).

Telephone system:
general assessment: Portugal's telephone system has achieved a state-of-the-art network with broadband, high-speed capabilities and a main line telephone density of 53%
domestic: integrated network of coaxial cables, open-wire, microwave radio relay, and domestic satellite earth stations
international: 6 submarine cables; satellite earth stations - 3 Intelsat (2 Atlantic Ocean and 1 Indian Ocean), NA Eutelsat; tropospheric scatter to Azores; note - an earth station for Inmarsat (Atlantic Ocean region) is planned

== Radio ==
Radio broadcast stations: 346 AM and FM (many are repeaters) (2024)

Radios: 3.02 million (1997)

== Television ==
Television broadcast stations: 170 (plus repeaters) (2024)

Television paid subscriptions: 4.6 million (2023)

Free-to-air television networks:

Rádio e Televisão de Portugal:

- RTP1
- RTP2
- RTP3
- RTP Memória

Free-to-air national coverage stations:

- SIC
- TVI

Regional Stations:

- Porto Canal
- RTP Açores
- RTP Madeira

International:

- RTPi (sat/cable)
- RTP África (sat/cable/on-air)
- SIC Internacional (sat/cable)

Analog TV system:

- PAL (625 line, 50 Hz.)

Digital TV system:

- DVB-T (MPEG4 for SD and HD broadcasts.)

NOTE: Most TV Networks/stations have specific interactive TV(cable) oriented services.

== Internet ==
Internet Users: 8.84 million (2024)

Internet Hosts: 1.858 million (2007)

Internet Service Providers (ISPs): 4 (2024)

Country code (Top level domain): .pt

== See also ==
- Media of Portugal:
  - List of radio stations in Portugal
  - Television in Portugal
  - List of newspapers in Portugal
