= RTP Antena 2 =

Portuguese radio station

- Portugal
- Broadcast area: Portugal - National FM
- Frequencies: 88.0 – 106.8 MHz (mainland Portugal)

Programming
- Format: Classical and world music, culture

Ownership
- Owner: Rádio e Televisão de Portugal

History
- First air date: 2 May 1948; 78 years ago
- Former names: Emissora Nacional Programa 2 (1948–1975); RDP Programa 2 (1976–1990)

Technical information
- Transmitter coordinates: 38.75966294°N 9.11785305°W

Links
- Webcast: RTP Play
- Website: www.rtp.pt/antena2/

RTP Antena 2 is one of the three national radio channels produced by the Portuguese public broadcasting entity Rádio e Televisão de Portugal, the others being RTP Antena 1 and RTP Antena 3.

The channel specializes in the broadcasting of classical and world music as well as other programmes of a cultural nature.

In December 2019, it had a weekly reach share of 1.4%.

== History ==
Antena 2 logo from 2004 to 2016.

The station has its origins in a second medium wave transmitter near Lisbon, in Barcarena, known as Lisboa 2. In the 1950s, its power had increased to 135KW. Its 1955 plans led to the creation of a second FM transmitter in Lisbon after Lisboa 1 (which had its transmitter located in Castanheira do Ribatejo) started FM broadcasts. In the 1960s, the network was renting out slots to independent production houses, which were criticized by the amount of talk and advertising. From 1950 to 1957, Lisboa 2 broadcast Rádio Universidade, which later moved to Lisboa 1.

In the early 1960s, the network broadcast eight hours a day, with an afternoon period from 12:00 to 15:00, and an evening period from 19:00 to 00:00. Under Emissora Nacional, the network broadcast from two medium wave transmitters (Lisboa 2 and Porto 2).

In 1976, the network, following the creation of RDP, was renamed Programa 2. The station broadcast 17 hours a day and reported 198,000 listeners in 1978.

In mid-1981, Programa 2 reached 60% of the population using its FM transmitting network. The concept of a cultural radio station broadened beyond its conventional erudite content, this time including areas such as jazz, popular music, cinema, biology, among others. The elitist format of the station was being replaced by a more formative one, in order to increase its listener base. In 1985, medium wave broadcasts ended, with its transmitter being given to Rádio Comercial. In the wake of this decision, station director José Atalaya quit. The closure of its MW transmititer was a source of criticism from RDP employees, with some believing that it alienated some of its audience. In 1988, 24-hour broadcasts started; shortly afterwards, the station started playing tracks from CDs. It also produced a live satellite broadcast in collaboration with France Musique. The 1988 Portugal-France experiment later paved way for the broadcast of the EBU's classical concert season.

In the early 90s, the station was renamed RDP 2, later Rádio Cultura. In 1994, it was renamed Antena 2. José Manuel Nunes became its new director, increasing its news operation, including traffic updates, but cutting on opera and speech.

Antena 2 logo used from 2016 to 29 March 2026.

On 30 March 2026, the station has been renamed RTP Antena 2 after the adoption of a single branding strategy on 18 February 2026. The rebranding was designed by Ivity Brand Corp, a Portuguese design agency responsible for RTP corporate rebrand.

== See also ==
- List of radio stations in Portugal
