= Rádio Radar =

Almada; Portugal
- Broadcast area: Lisbon metropolitan area
- Frequency: 97.8 MHz

Ownership
- Owner: Everything is New

History
- First air date: 25 June 2002; 22 years ago

Links
- Webcast: Rádio Radar Webcast
- Website: radarlisboa.fm

Rádio Radar is a Portuguese local radio station based in Almada, which broadcasts in the Lisbon metropolitan area. It focuses on alternative and indie music.

The station started broadcasting on 25 June 2002. Its inaugural day was dedicated to Radiohead, in anticipation of the band's upcoming concerts in Portugal in July of that year.

In 2017, the station was bought by Everything is New alongside Radio Oxigénio. The two stations were formerly owned by Música no Coração.

== See also ==
- List of radio stations in Portugal
