= Rádio Festival =

- Porto; Portugal
- Frequency: 94.8 MHz

Programming
- Format: Portuguese music

Ownership
- Owner: Música no Coração (until 2024); Medialivre (March-November 2024)

History
- First air date: 2 April 1986; 39 years ago
- Last air date: 11 November 2024; 16 months ago (after 38 years, 223 days)

Rádio Festival was a Portuguese radio station, covering the Porto metropolitan area and broadcasting from Porto.

Launched on April 11, 1986, its name was derived from a program that was aired on the now-defunct Emissores do Norte Reunidos in the 1960s and 70s. The station promoted Portuguese music throughout its existence, especially popular music and fado. It was reported in 2006 that Luís Montez, of the Música no Coração group, hadn't paid part of the sale clauses since December 2002, being put on trial on May 23, 2006. Montez was absolved in October.

In March 2024, ERC authorized Medialivre to buy the station in order to grant a frequency for Correio da Manhã Rádio in the Porto area. The station winded down operations in November 11, 2024, becoming a relay of CM Rádio.
