= News Now =

Portuguese TV news channel

- Country: Portugal
- Broadcast area: Portugal

Programming
- Language: Portuguese
- Picture format: 16:9 576i (SDTV); 16:9 1080i (HDTV)

Ownership
- Owner: Medialivre
- Sister channels: CMTV

History
- Launched: June 17, 2024; 2 years ago

Links
- Website: www.nowcanal.pt

News Now, or just Now, is a Portuguese news channel, owned by the Medialivre group. It competes against RTP Notícias, SIC Notícias and CNN Portugal. The channel launched on 17 June 2024.

== History ==
Medialivre applied to the National Institute of Industrial Property (INPI) on February 20 for registration that was "awaiting opposition". The process was set to be completed by May 2.

On March 5, Medialivre opened a new studio with the aim of creating a new television channel, tentatively named Canal 9. By mid-April, Medialivre had bought a studio to accommodate the channel. The brand was registered on February 20, pending opposition from ERC.

The channel was presented to the public on May 3, 2024. In that same presentation, the News Now logo was revealed. The O of the logo resembles the logo that the defunct Canal Nou had between 2005 and October 2013, as well as the O of the Italian channel Nove.

The Now channel started "in the first half of the year" according to Luís Santana, who explained the reason for the name, which took position nine on the MEO, NOS and Vodafone Portugal platforms. The news bulletins were initially supposed to have a length of fifteen minutes.

Now signed an agreement with Euronews in early June 2024 for the broadcast and production of news items between both channels. The channel also removed the word "News" from its logo ahead of launch.

== Programs ==
- News Now Todas as Manhãs
- News Now Todas as Tardes
- News Now Meia Noite
- News Now Todas as Noites
- Jornal do Mundo
- Liberdade de Expressão
- Negócios
- Jornal às 12
- Record na Hora
- Jornal às 20
- Informação Privilegiada
- Global 5.0
- Frente a Frente
- Sábado Viajante
- Máxima
- Repórter Sábado
- GPS
- Otimista (with António Costa)

== Criticism ==
In the early hours of 14 July 2024, during its coverage of the attempted assassination of Donald Trump, Now aired a photo of Italian sports commentator Marco Violi. He was believed to be the author of the attack, which wasn't the case.
