= Jeux sans frontières season 20 =

Jeux sans frontières
- Season 20
- No. of teams: 5 countries
- Winner: (Portugal) Azores
- Runner-up: (Italy) Monte Argentario
- Head referee: Guido Pancaldi
- No. of episodes: 9

Release
- Original network: RTBF1; Antenne 2; Raiuno; RTP1
- Original release: June 1989 – September 1989

Season chronology
- ← Previous; Season 19 Next → Season 21

The 20th season of the international television game show Jeux sans frontières was held in the summer of 1989. Broadcasters from Belgium, France, Italy, Portugal, and San Marino participated in the competition coordinated by the European Broadcasting Union (EBU). The different heats were hosted by each of the participant broadcasters in locations in their countries such as Castiglione delle Stiviere (Italy), Tomar (Portugal), Nice (France), and Brussels (Belgium). The grand final was held in Funchal (Portugal). The head international referees in charge of supervising the competition was Guido Pancaldi.

For each heat, each broadcaster sent a mixed team of twelve members (six men and six women) from a city or town from its country that competed against each other in a series of games –funny physical games played in outlandish costumes, though none-the-less technically difficult– themed in the specific topic of the episode. After the eight heats, the most successful team from each country competed in the grand final. Each of the episodes was presented by the host broadcaster in its own language. Each of the participating broadcasters had their own presenters who did some on-site presentations for their audience and commented on the competition in their language. Due the complexity of the production, and that each broadcaster had its own personalized coverage, the episodes were filmed first and each broadcaster broadcast them at their convenience later.

The season was won by the team from Azores, Portugal, being the runner-up the team from Monte Argentario, Italy.

== Participants ==
Country	Broadcaster	Code	Colour
Belgium	RTBF	B	Yellow
France	Antenne 2	F	Green
Italy	RAI	I	Light blue
Portugal	RTP	P	Orange
San Marino	–	SM	Red

== Heats ==
=== Heat 1 ===
Heat 1 was hosted by RAI in Castiglione delle Stiviere, Italy.

Place	Country	Town	Points
1	I	Recoaro Terme	48
2	B	Walcourt	46
3	P	Viseu	45
3	SM	Mercatale	45
5	F	Levallois-Perret	35

=== Heat 2 ===
Heat 2 was hosted by RTP in Tomar, Portugal.

Place	Country	Town	Points
1	P	Azores	56
2	I	Riccione	49
3	B	Rochefort	38
4	F	La Roche-sur-Yon	36
4	SM	Acquaviva	36

=== Heat 3 ===
Heat 3 was hosted by Antenna 2 in Nice, France.

Place	Country	Town	Points
1	P	Guimarães	52
2	F	Nice	51
3	SM	Domagnano	49
4	I	Castellana Grotte	38
5	B	Huy	35

=== Heat 4 ===
Heat 4 was hosted by RTBF on the Heysel/Heizel Plateau in Brussels, Belgium.

Place	Country	Town	Points
1	P	Águeda	50
2	SM	Fiorentino	46
3	B	Brussels	42
4	F	Saint-Amand-les-Eaux	40
5	I	Ercolano	33

=== Heat 5 ===
Heat 5 was hosted by RAI in Castiglione delle Stiviere, Italy.

Place	Country	Town	Points
1	B	Marche-en-Famenne	54
2	I	Castiglione delle Stiviere	51
3	F	Arcachon Bay / Gujan-Mestras	43
4	P	Figueira da Foz	39
5	SM	Serravalle	34

=== Heat 6 ===
Heat 6 was hosted by RTP in Tomar, Portugal.

Place	Country	Town	Points
1	P	Tomar	48
2	I	Brebbia	44
3	F	Suresnes	43
4	B	Visé	40
5	SM	Chiesanuova	38

=== Heat 7 ===
Heat 7 was hosted by Antenne 2 in Nice, France.

Place	Country	Town	Points
1	I	Monte Argentario	48
1	SM	Faetano	48
3	B	Fleurus	43
4	F	Nice	37
4	P	Alto Minho	37

=== Heat 8 ===
Heat 8 was hosted by RTBF on the Heysel Plateau in Brussels, Belgium.

Place	Country	Town	Points
1	P	Madeira	56
2	F	Boulogne-Billancourt	48
3	I	Cefalù	45
4	SM	Montegiardino	38
5	B	Brussels	32

== Final ==
The final was hosted by RTP in Funchal, Portugal.

Place	Country	Town	Points
1	P	Azores	54
2	I	Monte Argentario	49
3	F	Nice	47
4	B	Marche-en-Famenne	41
4	SM	Faetano	41

== Broadcasts ==
Broadcasters and commentators in participating countries
Country	Broadcaster(s)	Channel(s)	Local presenter(s)/Commentator(s)	Ref.
Belgium	RTBF	RTBF1	Sylvie Rigot; Thierry Tinlot	
France	Antenne 2		Marie-Ange Nardi; Fabrice	
Italy	RAI	Raiuno	Claudio Lippi	
Portugal	RTP	RTP1	Eládio Clímaco; Ana do Carmo	
