= Jornal de Negócios =

Portuguese business newspaper

- Type: Business newspaper
- Format: Tabloid
- Owner: Cofina
- Publisher: Mediafin-Sociedade Editora
- Founded: 1998; 28 years ago
- Language: Portuguese
- Headquarters: Lisbon
- Circulation: 10,501 (2010)
- Sister newspapers: Correio da Manhã
- Website: www.jornaldenegocios.pt

Jornal de Negócios (meaning Business Newspaper in English) is a Portuguese language business newspaper published in Lisbon, Portugal.

== History and profile ==
Jornal de Negócios was started in 1997 as a finance website, being the first in the country. In 1998 it became a business newspaper and on 8 May 2003 it began to be published daily.

Jornal de Negócios is owned by Cofina and is based in Lisbon. Its sister newspaper is Correio da Manhã, also owned by Cofina. Both papers are published in tabloid format. The publisher of Jornal de Negócios is Mediafin-Sociedade Editora.

== Circulation ==
In 2003 Jornal de Negócios had a circulation of 10,000 copies. Its 2004 circulation was 8,000 copies. In 2007 the paper had a circulation of 8,000 copies. The circulation of the paper was 10,668 copies in 2009 and 10,501 copies in 2010.
