= Bruno Aleixo =

Portuguese animated character

Bruno Aleixo is a Portuguese animated character that gained popularity between 2010 and 2012. Created by the collective GANA (Guionistas e Argumentistas Não-Alinhados (Non-aligned Scriptwriters and Screenwriters)), Bruno Aleixo was featured in a series of programs titled The Aleixo Show. Originally envisioned as an ambiguous mix of a bear and a dog, Aleixo's appearance was soon changed due to his resemblance to the copyrighted Ewok characters of the Star Wars franchise. Raised in Coimbra, Aleixo also has Brazilian heritage.

Aleixo became popular through a series of internet videos titled Os Conselhos Que Vos Deixo ["The Advice that I Leave You"], and through an appearance with Nuno Markl in Os Incorrigíveis [The Incorrigibles].

== Creation ==
The character first appeared in a format resembling an Ewok in early 2008 (50 pratos, 49 são iguarias), creating a cult following. In November 2008 the first television series (O Programa do Aleixo) appeared, followed by further web series. One of those series was a supposed Uruguayan rip-off, El Circo Bueno, which was produced in Brazil. By then, Bruno Aleixo's videos became popular in Brazil. The creators thought that Bruno Aleixo was a niche production, but its success in 2008 alone caused the creation of new projects that had financial compensation.

== Characters ==
These characters appeared gradually in season 1 of O Programa do Aleixo.

- Busto: co-host of The Aleixo Show in season 1, a personification of a Napoleon Bonapart bust.
- Dr. Ribeiro: a medical doctor who has been invisible since the age of 34. Ribeiro works at the University Hospital of Coimbra and has a slight drinking problem. Occasionally, when drunk, he will walk naked through the hospital, which people only realize because they see his liquor bottle floating through the halls.
- Nelson Miguel Rodrigues Pinto: doorman of Aleixo's building; he hails from Figueira da Foz and is depicted as somewhat dim-witted.
- Renato Alexandre: a personification of the film character, the Gill-Man from Creature from the Black Lagoon. He is an engineering student who studied for a time in the Czech Republic under the auspices of the European Erasmus Programme. Renato is presumed to be a recovered drug addict, having taken methadone at some time in the past.
- Velhadas: An old man (resembling Charles Darwin), he was introduced in one of the "A Friend of Mine" segments, and then reported missing. He was mentioned in the New Year special that concluded the first season, he was sleeping.
- Busto's cousin: appeared as a co-host for one half of an episode, when Busto was said to have gone to the doctor. Like Busto, Busto's cousin is also a bust, this time of Beethoven. Like Beethoven, Busto's cousin is hard of hearing, comically mishearing things, and always tells the same stories, which always begin with "one time..."
- Bussaco man: hailing from Serra do Buçaco, Bussaco man is portrayed as prehistoric, with diction so poor that captions are required to understand what he is saying.

== The Aleixo Show ==
Starting on November 9, 2008, Bruno Aleixo starred in his own program on Portuguese television channel SIC Radical where he presented (alongside a bust of Napoleon called, simply, "Busto" ["Bust"]) various skits which formed, according to him, a talk show. The first season consisted of seven episodes, six regular episodes plus a New Year special.

In June 2009, the program returned in repeats on SIC Radical, and a teaser for a spin-off called "Aleixo the Tourist" set to be aired in 2010 was released on the internet.

A second season premiered in November 2012, also consisting of seven episodes.

=== Skits ===
The show featured various regular skits such as:

- "Press Review": Aleixo and Busto discuss various headlines from the fictitious local newspaper Gazeta de Coimbra;
- "A Friend of Mine": Aleixo introduces his various quirky friends;
- "Civil Opinion": a satire of public opinion programs and forums;
- "Urban Myths": Busto presents various urban myths and Aleixo tells whether it is true or not;
- "Interview": Interviews with public figures, in the style of a conversation between friends, often featuring embarrassing episodes from their personal lives or jokes
  - Interviewees in the first season included Paulo Furtado, José Luís Peixoto, Fernando Alvim, Rui Pedro Tendinha, Miguel Guilherme, Fernando Martins and Manuel João Vieira.
- "Mister Cimba": A fictional sponsor satirizing excursion and shopping companies;
- "Home Game": Home audience participation segment featuring home hobbies, with offbeat prizes to the participants;
- "Animatography": Aleixo and Bruno make humorous comments on movie trailers, mostly from the mid-20th century.

All episodes end with a piano version of a hit tune (without any apparent connection to the theme of the show), sung by Aleixo and Busto.

== Aleixo Psi ==
Aleixo Psi is a 2017 follow up series of the Aleixo Show.

Due to unpredictable and unforeseeable life events, Bruno Aleixo is mandated to undergo psychological counselling by a court order. Throughout the 6 episodes of Aleixo Psi, we follow Mr. Aleixo in a journey of self-discovery and confrontation with his unresolved issues and past. We are aided by his characteristic honest and self-critical personality, his full commitment to truth, eagerness for self-improvement, and of course, the guidance of the co-star of this series, the Psychologist. Aleixo Psi unveils many important details about the mysterious past of the talented Bruno Aleixo, how he came to be the well educated dilettante and self-made man we all admire, and what he had to sacrifice to accomplish so much with sparse resources and in such a short timespan.

== Spin offs ==
The Aleixo Show spawned a number of spin-offs that were released exclusively online, including:

- Aleixo in the Hospital
- Busto at Work
- Aleixo in Brazil
- Aleixo at School
- My Advice to You
- Mister Cimba
- 7 Arts
- The Gang

In November 2009, SIC Radical broadcast the 7 Arts and The Gang episodes, and Aleixo in Brazil and Busto at Work were broadcast in 2010. Bussaco Man won a spot in the RTP2 program 5 Para A Meia-Noite.

== Radio broadcast ==
Bruno Aleixo made his radio debut on December 2, 2009, at the top of the daily program Aleixo FM on the Portuguese radio station Antena 3. The program consisted of small segments of two to three minutes each, with Aleixo and Busto discussing various current events and giving suggestions for leisure-time activities. The two regulars were often joined by characters from The Aleixo Show.

After 104 episodes, the Aleixo FM program ended March 26, 2010. Later, the radio show returned in September 2015 airing on Wednesday's mornings. In September 2016, a new Monday radio show named "Aleixopédia" was debuted. It's a show that uses the classic Aleixo FM radio show format yet focuses on Music trivia.
