= TV Guia =

Weekly television magazine in Portugal

- Categories: Television magazine
- Frequency: Weekly
- Founded: 1979; 47 years ago
- Company: Cofina
- Country: Portugal
- Based in: Lisbon
- Language: Portuguese

TV Guia is a Portuguese language weekly television magazine published in Portugal. It has been in circulation since 1979.

== History and profile ==
TV Guia was established in 1979. The magazine is part of the Cofina, which acquired it in 2002. It is published on a weekly basis and offers news about television programs and social events. Until June 2013 the magazine had a supplement, TV Guia Novelas.

The circulation of TV Guia was 70,000 copies in 2007. Its circulation was 74,891 copies in 2010. It rose to 75,004 copies in 2011. It was 70,871 copies in 2012. The magazine had a circulation of 65,012 copies between September and October 2013.

== See also ==
- List of magazines in Portugal
