= RTP Mobile =

- Country: Portugal
- Broadcast area: Portugal

Programming
- Picture format: 4:3 SDTV

History
- Launched: 27 July 2006
- Closed: 2012
- Replaced by: RTP Play

RTP Mobile was a Portuguese television channel owned and operated by state-owned public broadcaster Rádio e Televisão de Portugal (RTP). The service was available exclusively on mobile TV services provided by the three telecommunications companies (Optimus, Vodafone and TMN) as well as on RTP's website. It started broadcasting in 2006 and silently closed in 2012.

== History ==
In July 2006, RTP announced the creation of a full RTP Mobile channel by September. RTP had already distributed content to Optimus, Vodafone and TMN's multimedia portals, but started a full channel as part of a new strategy involving themed radio services, online TV and podcasts. At launch, the channel was set to be received by one million 3G cellphone users and planned to include a full schedule aggregating content produced for the several RTP channels. Negotiations to air football matches on the service were underway. The channel would not be financed by commercial advertising. Broadcasts began on 27 July 2006. During its early months, it aired eight to ten live programs a day, including Telejornal.

In April 2007, the channel's first original program, Quinze, launched, produced by Produções Fictícias. The name was justified on its fifteen suggestions in the cultural sector. By then, the service had 500,000 viewers.

On 8–10 May 2008, it launched a pop-up channel to cover the 2008 Portugal Rally, exclusive to Vodafone. Subscribers of other networks had access to tape-delayed coverage. For the 2008 Summer Olympics, it did the same, but on TMN.

Coverage of Portuguese league matches began in January 2009, using the matches broadcast on RTP1. This was extended for the 2009–10 season.

RTP Mobile was last active officially for the 2012 Summer Olympics. It subsequently shut down following the creation of mobile RTP Play apps.
