= Mauvilla =

Mauvilla or similar terms may refer to:

- variant of Mabila, a Mississippian fortress town
- the origin of the name for Mobile, Alabama
- the Bahia de la Mobila, which was named in English Mobile Bay
- Mobilian, a tribe in Alabama
- the towboat Mauvilla in the 1993 Big Bayou Canot train wreck
- the Mavilla Bridge in Puerto Rico
- Mavilla, Vega Alta, Puerto Rico, a barrio
