= Sábado (magazine) =

Portuguese magazine

- Frequency: Weekly
- Circulation: 57,261 (September–October 2013)
- Publisher: Cofina
- Founded: 1988; 37 years ago
- Country: Portugal
- Based in: Lisbon
- Language: Portuguese
- Website: www.sabado.pt

Sábado is a Portuguese weekly news magazine published in Portugal. It is the first modern news magazine in the country.

== History and profile ==
Sábado was established in 1988 and closed down in 1993. The magazine was relaunched by Cofina on 7 May 2004. It is published on a weekly basis and covers news on politics, society, culture, sports and leisure.

The 2005 circulation of Sábado was 48,737 copies. The weekly had a circulation of 65,000 copies in 2007. Its circulation was 76,924 copies in 2010 and 74,431 copies in 2011. It was 66,456 copies in 2012. The magazine had a circulation of 57,261 copies between September and October 2013.

== See also ==
- List of magazines in Portugal
