= Luís Miguel Loureiro =

Luís Miguel Loureiro is a Portuguese state television (Rádio e Televisão de Portugal) journalist and media researcher at the University of Minho in Braga.

He conducted live reporting for RTP television and RDP national radio from Beirut, and Tyre, Lebanon during the final two weeks of the 2006 Israel-Hezbollah War until after the UN negotiated ceasefire. He was also awarded two honourable mentions at the 2006 UNESCO Journalism for Human Rights Prize and the AMI Foundation Journalism Against Indifference Prize for his in-depth journalistic reporting on social issues such as long-lasting drug abuse and its effects on human dignity, public health, and society.

== Career in journalism ==
Loureiro started as a professional journalist in 1992, at the Porto-based Rádio Nova. Some of his missions included special reporting during the historical Portugal: Que Futuro? national Congress, April 1994 and the 1st Portuguese/Morocco Political Summit in Rabat, Morocco, June 1994. He was also one of the radio's early morning newscasters, between 1992 and 1994. His 1993 investigation on the transfer of a renowned football player, Paulo Futre, to the Portuguese club Benfica, indirectly paid by national public TV broadcaster RTP, led to the exoneration of the latter Executive Board.

In 1994 he joined the national Radio Comercial Porto newsroom. The assignment for Spain's 1996 national elections and an investigation on the role of political marketing during the Portuguese 1995 national elections (who led to the fall of the entire marketing team of the social-democrat party (PSD).

From 1997 on he works mainly as a reporter for the national TV public broadcaster RTP. From 1998 to 2000 he anchored the public service program "Consultório", an audience-forum broadcast, on environmental and sustainability issues, presenting the first-ever debate on one of the would-be polemics of Portugal's new millennium politics:.

His main assignments as a national TV senior reporter were being a war correspondent in Beirut and Tyre (Lebanon) during the 2006 Israel-Hezbollah War, special reporting from Phuket and Khao Lak areas on the effects and recovery process from the 2004 Asian tsunami catastrophe in Thailand, and an in-depth report on the living conditions in the village of Båtsfjord in Finnmark county, Norway, a far-north cod-fishing community. He authored several in-depth breakthrough stories on themes such as the post-traumatic stress disorder on Portuguese colonial war veterans, the increasing phenomenon of Portuguese medical students going abroad (in the Czech Republic and Spain) and the multi-awarded special report "Flutuantes", on the effects of long-lasting drug abuse on middle-aged Portuguese homeless addicts.

Luis Miguel Loureiro is now also a communication sociology PhD student and journalism teacher at the University of Minho Institute of Social Sciences, in Braga, Portugal. He is currently one of the promoters of the digital newspaper De Norte a Sul (From North to South), covering news from Galicia and Portugal, launched on 25 April 2026, in which he serves as director.
