= Correio da Manhã Rádio =

Radio station in Portugal

- Type: Radio network
- Country: Portugal
- First air date: 1987; 39 years ago (original); 11 November 2024; 18 months ago (current)
- Radio stations: 2
- Headquarters: Lisbon and Porto
- Broadcast area: Nationwide
- Owner: Medialivre
- Dissolved: 1993; 33 years ago (original)
- Official website: Official website
- Language: Portuguese
- Replaced: SBSR in Lisbon and Rádio Festival in Porto

Correio da Manhã Rádio, branded as CM Rádio is a Portuguese radio network owned by Medialivre. A station with the same name existed from the late 1980s until 1993. The station is a partial simulcast of sister channel CMTV, as well as having its own programming.

== History ==
=== First CMR ===
The first CMR existed in 1987 on 101.5 FM in Lisbon. In its early months the station was known for playing albums in their entirety, with no interruptions for announcers. By the middle of the year, the station began to formally promote itself, using the name Correio da Manhã Rádio. In this phase, CMR started to build its identity, programming and presenter base. Weekdays from 07:00 to 20:00, the station provided a mix of music and news; at night and on weekends, the station prioritized author programming. The format changed in 1990 to compete against TSF by adding live football commentary and political debates. In March 1993 Rádio Comercial, which used to be under the aegis of Radiodifusão Portuguesa, was privatized. CMR's parent company bought Rádio Comercial, leading to the shutdown of the network.

=== Second CM Rádio ===
In 2024, Medialivre bought SBSR FM in Lisbon and Rádio Festival in Porto. Both stations were owned by Luís Montez's Música no Coração group. After the last broadcast of SBSR from its studios on September 30, 2024, Medialivre publicly appointed the team for its radio station. The team consists of 27 members.

Its public presentation was held on 24 October, where it was revealed that CM Rádio's launch date was November 11. Programming will include radio simulcasts of CMTV's Noite das Estrelas, Mercado, Manhã CM and Liga d'Ouro, as well as radio news bulletins, traffic updates and humor segments driven by current events. Portuguese singer Toy composed the new station's theme song. FM coverage will be limited to Lisbon and Porto, with the rest of the country receiving its signals from digital platforms. The station aims to target a possible leadership in the sector, and has plans to expand outside of the "polticial-media bubble" of Lisbon and Porto, where the station has its initial frequencies.

On November 1, 2024, the station started sponsoring Estrela da Amadora's tees.

The station started its services at 5:45am on November 11, 2024.

== Frequencies ==
City	Frequency	Replaced
Lisbon	90.4	SBSR FM
Porto	94.8	Rádio Festival
