= Mobile station (disambiguation) =

A mobile station is a system in telecommunications comprising all user equipment and software needed to communicate with a mobile network.

Mobile station may also refer to:

- Mobile station (Amtrak), an Amtrak station in Mobile, Alabama
- Gulf, Mobile and Ohio Passenger Terminal, a former train station in Mobile, Alabama
- Mobile radio station, a radio station used in motion
