= Claudio Loureiro =

Brazilian advertising executive

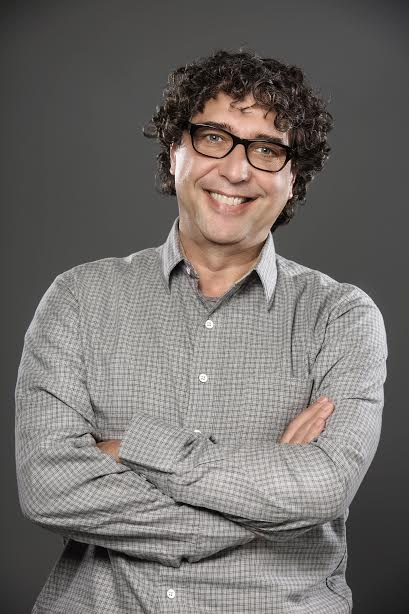
- Occupations: CEO and founder of Heads agency

Claudio Loureiro is a Brazilian advertising executive and entrepreneur, born in Curitiba. He is the founder and CEO of Heads, the largest privately held advertising agency in Brazil. The agency has clients such as Petrobrás, Grupo Boticário, 3M, Positivo Informática, Caixa Seguradora, Caixa, and Arbor.

Loureiro studied Law as an undergraduate at University Pontífica at Paraná. In 1997, Loureiro won the Colunistas Award as the Best advertising professional of the year.

He was one of the associate producers of the film Rio, I Love You. Loureiro is also a producer for Broadway musical “A Night with Janis Joplin”. In 2010, he took part in negotiations to bring Woody Allen to shoot in Rio de Janeiro. It would be Allen’s first film in Latin America.

In 2011, Loureiro was a speaker at TEDx. Loureiro won the CRPcom creation award in the category of social responsibility in 2013. He is also a member of the Brazilian branch of Young Presidents' Organization (YPO), a global network of chief executives and business leaders.
