= CMTV =

Portuguese TV news channel

- Country: Portugal
- Broadcast area: Portugal; Angola; Canada; Mozambique

Programming
- Picture format: 16:9 576i (SDTV); 16:9 1080i (HDTV)

Ownership
- Owner: Medialivre
- Sister channels: News Now

History
- Launched: 17 March 2013; 13 years ago

Links
- Website: CMTV

Correio da Manhã TV (CMTV) is a private Portuguese generalist channel, with a strong focus on news - specially crime and sensationalist subjects - and football. It is operated by Medialivre, owner of Correio da Manhã, a notable Portuguese tabloid and the most read newspaper in Portugal. It is available in basic fiber and satellite. The channel launched in March 2013 as an exclusive in Portugal to MEO.

CMTV aims to expand to other platforms as the exclusivity contract expires. Despite this, it reached the top 30 channels in Portugal. In late 2015 CMTV reached an agreement with NOS to be available in this subscription TV provider from 14 January 2016. With this agreement CMTV reached over 80% of the paid TV subscribers in Portugal. As of 2017, the channel is the 5th most watched in Portugal.

At the end of April 2022, the CMTV journalist Marta Louro, 27 years old, died during a motorcycle accident while on the way to report the news live.

== History ==
Correio da Manhã was behind the failed bid for TV1 in 1991, when the private television networks were being set up. The network's license was rejected on 6 February 1992, after the licenses were awarded to SIC and TVI.

On 29 June 2012, Cofina announced the launch of Correio da Manhã TV exclusively on MEO, launching next year, after a partnership between the two parties. Initially, it was set to launch in February 2013. José Carlos Castro, up until then working for TVI, was appointed the newspaper's director two weeks after the announcement of the channel's launch, on 12 July 2012.

Its first day on air was followed by 8,300 viewers. In September, it struck an agreement with S.L. Benfica to air the pre-match and the first five minutes of its matches.

== International ==
The channel expanded its broadcast to Angola and Mozambique in 2014.

A Canadian affiliate launched on Bell Fibe TV in July 2017, offering 3 hours of locally-produced programming daily. It is headed by Eduardo Vieira, who been publishing a localized version of the newspaper in the country since 2012. A recap series Correio Da Manhã Em Destaque began airing on Citytv in 2019. In 2022, the channel became available through the toober streaming platform, with a launch on Rogers and Shaw services in 2024. In 2023, CMCTV Canada acquired the rights to air Primeira Liga matches.
