= RTP Lusitânia =

Portuguese all-digital radio station

- Logo used since 30 March 2026
- Portugal
- Broadcast area: Portugal
- Frequency: Online

Programming
- Format: Portuguese music

Ownership
- Owner: Rádio e Televisão de Portugal

History
- First air date: 2 April 2008; 18 years ago
- Former names: Radio Lusitânia (2008–2016); Antena 1 Lusitânia (2016–2026)

Links
- Webcast: RTP Play

RTP Lusitânia (Rádio Lusitânia until 2016 and Antena 1 Lusitânia from 2016 to 2026) is RTP's first permanent all-digital radio station, created in 2008, initially available online followed later by an agreement with ZON (currently NOS). The station broadcasts a playlist of Portuguese music.

== History ==
Rádio Lusitânia started broadcasting on 2 April 2008 at the initiative of Guilherme Costa, who planned the launch of two further online-only stations by the end of the year. It became the first RTP radio station to focus entirely on Portuguese music. The station had programs, but without airing on fixed timeslots, as well as a two-hour schedule featuring the tracks that were played and were set to play. It had no team of its own, instead resorting to staff already working at RTP.

From April 2008 to May 2009, the station registered 200,000 contacts and an average of 90,000 unique listeners. By early 2009, it was already available on Zon TV Cabo's system, becoming the first online station to do so.

During its early years as Rádio Lusitânia, it had its own microsite within the RTP website, which, in addition to featuring the live stream and playlist, also featured polls.

== See also ==
- List of radio stations in Portugal
