= Rádio Renascença =

Portuguese radio station

- Portugal
- Broadcast area: Portugal

Programming
- Language: Portuguese

Ownership
- Owner: Grupo Renascença Multimédia
- Sister stations: RFM; Mega Hits

History
- First air date: 10 April 1936; 90 years ago

Links
- Webcast: Emissaopub
- Website: rr.pt

Rádio Renascença, also known as RR or just 'Renascença' (lit. 'Renaissance'), is a private, commercial radio station in Portugal, owned by various organizations within the Portuguese Catholic Church: among others, the Patriarchate of Lisbon. Founded in 1934, it began broadcasting in 1936. Renascença owns another three stations: RFM (the most listened-to radio station in the country), Mega Hits FM (most current hit charts), and until 2020, Rádio Sim (a channel aimed at listeners over 55).

Some programs, notably newscasts and religious events, are broadcast simultaneously on both Rádio Renascença and Rádio Sim.

Rádio Renascença is available in mainland Portugal on FM. Rádio Sim was available on medium wave, covering most of mainland Portugal, as well as on FM in some regions.

RR (Rádio Sim)'s most powerful medium-wave transmitter – operating on a frequency of 594 kHz with a power of 100 kW (although currently using 60 to 80 kW) – is situated near the village of Muge, some 75 km north-east of Lisbon. It is a 259-meter-high guyed mast radiator and also Portugal's tallest structure.

== History ==
Founded by Monsignor Lopes da Cruz, trial broadcasts began in June 1936 with a transmitter installed in Lisbon, broadcasting for one hour a day from 21:00 to 22:00 in shortwave. Regular broadcasting began on 1 January in the following year. A month after the start of daily broadcasts, the studios were ready at Rua Capelo and Radio Renascença settled there where it still remains. The name Renascença comes from a magazine of the same name (A Renascença), founded on 12 April 1931, which in 1933 demanded the creation of the station thanks to support from its readers, at a time when Lisbon already had its fair share of radio stations, but none of them had Catholic owners. The station was inserted within the structure of the Secretariat of Cinema and Radio on 9 March 1938. Two days later, Manuel Lopes da Cruz was appointed director of the secretariat. With the approval given by the regulatory bases on 10 April, the station was officially founded as an organ of Catholic action.

Renascença was a founding shareholder of Rádiotelevisão Portuguesa in 1955, as its second-largest shareholder after the first iteration of Rádio Clube Português.

Prior to 1974, Renascença was Catholic in orientation, but religious programming was limited, with a strong conservative political orientation. The station refused to cover doctrines of the Second Vatican Council, which begged for reforms.

Just after midnight on 25 April 1974 the station broadcast the banned song Grandola, Vila Morena as a signal to the revolutionary Armed Forces Movement (MFA) to commence operations against Portugal's authoritarian government in what became known as the Carnation Revolution: for this reason, the song later became famous as the anthem of the revolution.

In 1975 the radio station was occupied by workers, but in December of the same year it was returned to the Catholic Church and, unlike almost every other radio station in Portugal, Renascença was never nationalized. The station started carrying normal religious events, which the previous management was against, and during the 1975 crisis, was even denounced by Pope Paul VI, owing to concerns facing a potential shutdown which never happened.

1980 saw the creation of two of its long-running programs, the morning program Despertar (António Sala and Olga Cardoso, ended in 2000) and the sports news service Bola Branca (still on air). Despertar was also known for airing the first traffic service on Portuguese radio (presented by José Relvas) and its special editions outside the studio, either abroad or within Portugal, in less-conventional locations such as a cruise ship or a prison. The network started regionalizing itself in 1985, with the first station, in Évora, starting on 10 April, in conjunction with its 48th anniversary; other stations followed over time. The Évora station had been conducting test broadcasts since October 1984, which became regular in January 1985.

In 1986 Radio Renascença began to air two distinct program schedules, 24 hours a day: from Radio Renascença (nationwide on MW and FM) and from RFM (nationwide on FM). More recently, in 1998, Mega FM was created in order to reach a younger target audience.

On 4 March 2026, Renascença introduced a new identity, changing its logo (its logos for decades depicted two Rs) to a single, four-segmented R, as well as a new package of jingles.

== Frequencies ==
- Lisbon - 103.4 MHz
- Porto - 93.7 MHz
- Lousã (Coimbra / Leiria / Aveiro) - 106.0 MHz
- Montejunto (Santarém / Leiria) - 90.2 MHz
- Arrábida (Setúbal) - 105.8 MHz
- Mendro (Évora/Beja) - 96.5 MHz
- Portalegre - 95.3 MHz
- Gardunha (Castelo Branco) - 103.4 MHz
- Guarda - 90.2 MHz
- Bragança - 105.7 MHz
- Bornes - 89.6 MHz
- Minhéu - 89.8 MHz
- Marofa - 94.2 MHz
- Muro (Viana do Castelo / Braga) - 103.4 MHz
- Faro - 103.8 MHz
- Fóia (Serra de Monchique) - 98.6 MHz
- Lamego (Vila Real) - 98.6 MHz
- Sintra - 105.0 MHz
- Serra d' Ossa (Évora) - 98.5 MHz
- São Miguel (Azores) - 95.2 MHz
- Madeira island - 88.0 MHz
- Valença - 100.0 MHz
- Vouzela - 93.8 MHz
- Aveiro - 102.5 MHz

== See also ==
- Radio Maria
