= RFM (Portuguese radio station) =

- Portugal
- Broadcast area: Portugal - National FM
- Frequencies: 89.6 – 107.7 MHz (mainland Portugal), Madeira: 93.6 MHz, Azores (S. Miguel): 100.0 MHz 104.1MHz

Programming
- Format: Contemporary music

Ownership
- Owner: Grupo Renascença Multimédia
- Sister stations: Mega Hits; Rádio Renascença

History
- First air date: 1 January 1987; 39 years ago

Links
- Website: rfm.pt

RFM (from Renascença FM) is a Portuguese music radio station which belongs to r/com (Rádio Renascença group). The station plays mainly contemporary pop music, especially national and international hits. The station opened in its current guise on 1 January 1987.

== Coverage ==
RFM has an extensive FM national network which covers most of the population living in Portugal mainland. Additionally, the station has a transmitter in São Miguel island (Azores), reaching both São Miguel and Santa Maria islands, and a transmitter located in Madeira, covering not only that island, but also Porto Santo.
