= Correio da Manhã (Portugal) =

Portuguese newspaper

- The 26 December 2007 front page of Correio da Manhã
- Type: Daily newspaper
- Format: Tabloid
- Owner: Cofina
- Founded: 1979; 47 years ago
- Language: Portuguese
- Headquarters: Lisbon
- Circulation: 105,519 (January–August 2015)
- Sister newspapers: Jornal de Negócios
- ISSN: 0870-192X
- Website: www.correiomanha.pt

Correio da Manhã (Portuguese pronunciation: [kuˈʁɐju ðɐ mɐˈɲɐ̃], lit. 'Morning Post') is a Portuguese daily newspaper from Portugal. Published in Lisbon, it is the most circulated daily newspaper in Portugal.

== History and profile ==
Correio da Manhã was established in 1979. The paper is based in Lisbon. It is owned by the Cofina group and is published by its subsidiary. The company acquired the paper in 2000. Its sister newspaper is Jornal de Negócios. Both papers are published in tabloid format.

The newspaper focuses mainly on crime, scandals and attention-grabbing headlines. It has a populist stance.

== Circulation ==
Correio da Manhã is regarded as the most read general newspaper in the country. In the period of 1995–1996 the paper had a circulation of 69,000 copies, making it the best-selling paper in the country.

Between January and March 2003 the paper had a circulation of 118,000 copies. In 2003 it was the best selling newspaper in Portugal with a circulation of 107,000 copies. Its 2004 circulation was more than 100,000 copies. Next year its circulation was 119,431 copies.

Correio da Manhã had a circulation of 111,585 copies in 2006. In 2007 the daily was the best-selling newspaper in Portugal with a circulation of 115,000 copies. Its 2008 circulation rose to 122,090 copies. In 2009 it was also the best-selling newspaper in the country.

Between September and October 2013 Correio da Manhã had a circulation of 116,821 copies. It was 105,519 copies between January and August 2015.

== Sports club ==
In 1981 the employees of Correio da Manhã founded a sporting club whose futsal team won the Portuguese Futsal League twice.

== See also ==
- List of newspapers in Portugal
