= Mega Hits =

Portuguese radio station

- Portugal

Programming
- Language: Portuguese
- Format: Contemporary hit radio

Ownership
- Owner: Grupo Renascença Multimédia
- Sister stations: RFM; Rádio Renascença

Links
- Website: megahits.fm

Mega Hits is a Portuguese radio station and part of the r/com Group of the Portuguese Catholic Church. Established in 1998 and named Mega FM, it was renamed Mega Hits FM in 2009 due to a nationwide expansion. The station caters to the youth demographic.

Mega Hits FM mainly broadcasts dance music, pop music and rock.

== Frequencies ==
- Lisbon – 92.4 FM
- Porto – 90.6 FM
- Coimbra – 90.0 FM
- Sintra – 88.0 FM
- Aveiro – 96.5 FM
- Braga – 92.9 FM
- Viseu – 106.4 FM
- Algarve – 97.1 FM

== Schedule ==
- Snooze: Maria Correia Conguito and Mafalda Castro (6 AM-10 AM)
- Teresa Oliveira (10 AM-2 PM)
- Diogo Pires (2 PM-5 PM)
- Drive In: Catarina Palma and Inês Andrade (5 PM-8 PM)
- Ana Pinheiro (8 PM-11 PM)
- Hot n' Slow (11 PM-Midnight)
- Fresh: Nelson Cunha (Fridays, 8 PM-9 PM)
- The Listening: Teresa Oliveira (Saturdays, 1 PM-2 PM)
- Top 10 às 10: Diogo Pires (Sundays, 10 AM - 12 PM)
- Mega Hits TikTok Radioshow: Maria Correia (Sundays, 12 PM - 2 PM)

== Broadcasters ==
- Maria Correia
- Teresa Oliveira
- Catarina Palma
- Ana Pinheiro
- Mafalda Castro
- Luís Pinheiro
- Inês Nogueira
- Conguito (Fábio Lopes)
- Alexandre Guimarães
- Diogo Pires
- Inês Andrade
- Nelson Cunha
