= Medialivre =

Portuguese media conglomerate

Medialivre S.A.
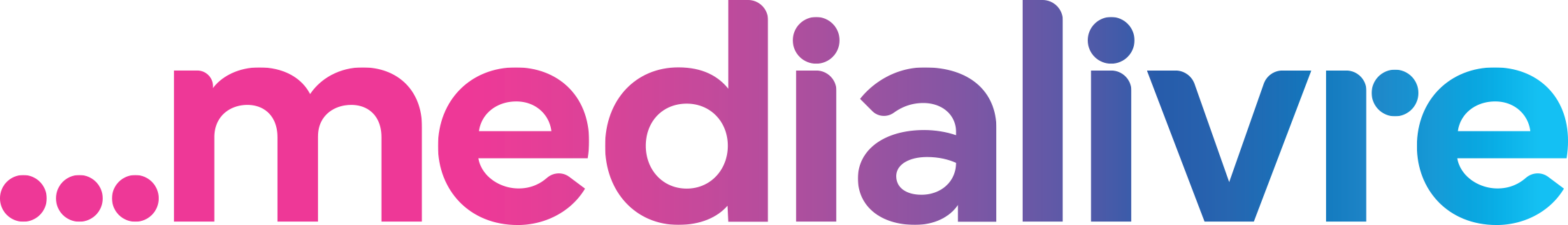
- Type: Sociedade aberta
- Industry: Media
- Founded: 1995 (as Cofina Media); 2023 (as Medialivre)
- Headquarters: Lisbon, Portugal
- Key people: Domingos José Vieira de Matos
- Products: Radio, TV stations, Magazines, Newspaper, Internet
- Subsidiaries: Expressão Livre
- Website: www.medialivre.pt

Medialivre S.A. (formerly Cofina Media) is a Portuguese media conglomerate. The company was established in 1995. It has its headquarters in Porto.

== Group brands ==
Medialivre publishes four newspapers: Correio da Manhã, Record, Jornal de Negócios, Destak.

Medialivre also publishes two printed magazines: Sábado and TV Guia as well as two online People magazines: Flash! and Máxima.

Medialivre also owns two television channels: CMTV and News Now. CMTV is the fourth largest generalist channel in Portugal. and News Now is the fourth largest news channel in Portugal. In November 2024, CM Rádio launched.

== History ==
Since October 26, 2023, the new owners of Medialivre are a group of investors that include Cristiano Ronaldo through Portuguese company Expressão Livre.

On December 14, 2023, the new Medialivre brand was officially launched with a new logo to reflect the values of a sustainable and people-focused company. Cristiano Ronaldo is among the group of investors that bought Cofina Media on October 26, 2023.
