= Rádio e Televisão de Portugal =

Portuguese broadcasting company

Rádio e Televisão de Portugal, S.A.
- Logo used since 2026, removal of antenna symbol, which has been part of RTP's identity in various incarnations for more than nearly 70 years since the start of RTP logo in 1957.

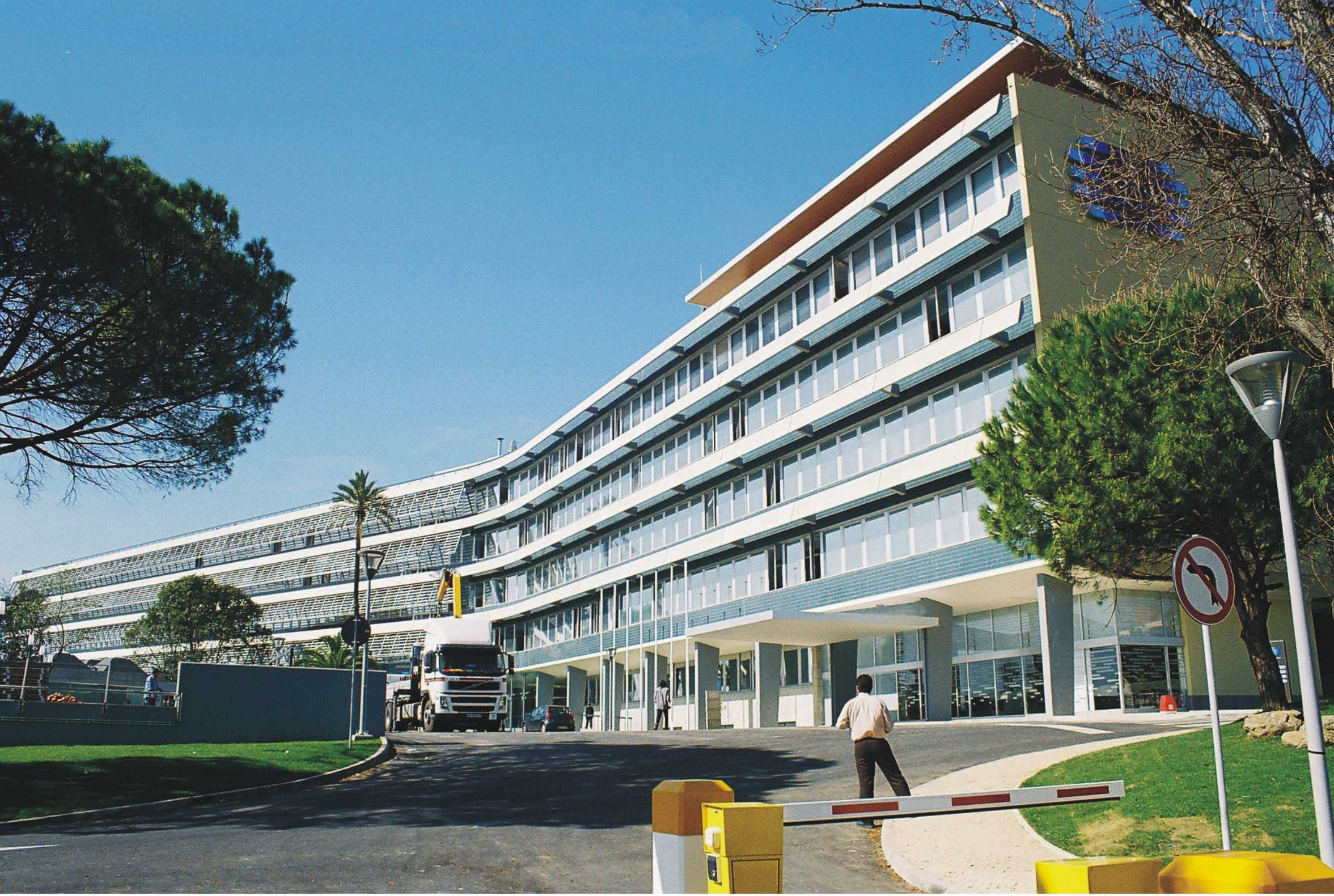
- RTP headquarters in Cabo Ruivo, Lisbon
- Type: Sociedade anónima
- Industry: Mass media
- Genre: Public service broadcasting
- Predecessors: Emissora Nacional / Radiodiffusão Portuguesa (1935–2004); Radiotelevisão Portuguesa (1955–2004)
- Founded: 1935; 91 years ago (as Emissora Nacional); 1955; 71 years ago (as Radiotelevisão Portuguesa); 2004; 22 years ago (as Rádio e Televisão de Portugal)
- Headquarters: Cabo Ruivo, Lisbon, Portugal; 38°45′34.63″N 9°7′3.17″W
- Area served: Portugal
- Key people: Nicolau Santos, Chairman of the Board
- Services: Television; radio; online
- Revenue: €235.154 million (2023)▲
- Owner: Government of Portugal
- Number of employees: 1809 (2023)
- Subsidiaries: (List of radio stations); (List of television channels)
- Website: rtp.pt

Rádio e Televisão de Portugal (Note: Pronounced [ˈʁaðju i tɨlɨviˈzɐ̃w dɨ puɾtuˈɣal]; lit. "Radio and Television of Portugal".) (RTP) is the public service broadcasting organisation of Portugal. It operates four national television channels and three national radio stations, as well as several satellite and cable offerings.

The current company dates from 2007, with the merger of two previously separate companies Radiodifusão Portuguesa (RDP; the radio broadcaster) and Radiotelevisão Portuguesa (television broadcaster), although they had been grouped under a single holding company and common branding since 2004.

RTP is funded by a broadcasting contribution tax which is incorporated in electricity bills, and by advertising revenues.

== History ==
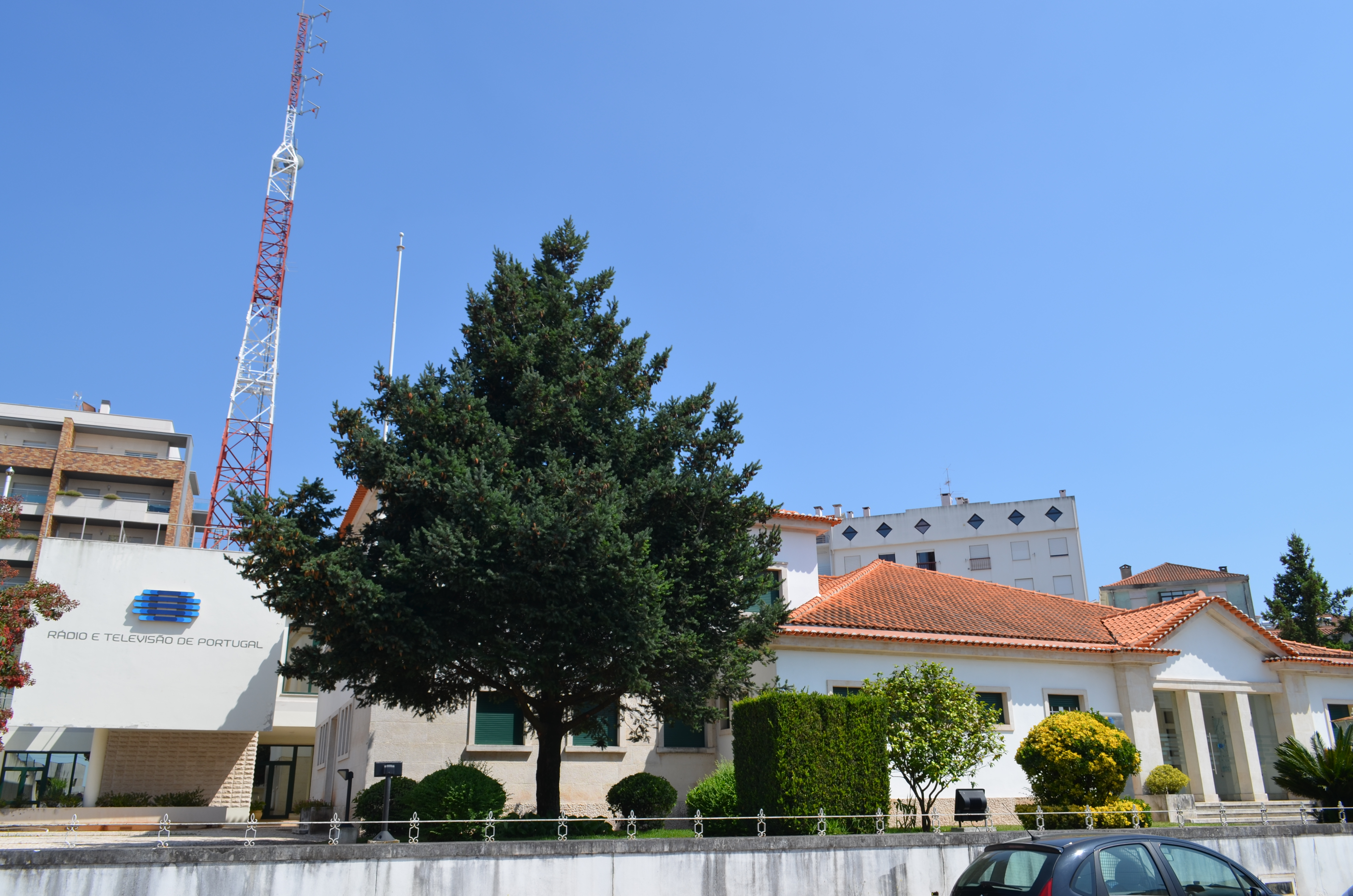
RTP branch at Coimbra.

=== Radio ===
The Emissora Nacional de Radiodifusão, usually referred to by its abbreviated designation Emissora Nacional (EN), was established on 4 August 1935 as the public national radio broadcaster, inheriting the previous broadcasting operations of the Portuguese postal service (CTT). Five years later, EN became independent of the CTT.

Emissora Nacional was one of the 23 founding broadcasting organisations of the European Broadcasting Union in 1950. Following the Carnation Revolution, EN was reorganised and in 1976 changed its name to Radiodifusão Portuguesa (RDP). During this process, several previously private radio stations – such as Rádio Clube Português (RCP) – were nationalised and integrated into RDP.

In 1979, the RCP network was rebranded as Rádio Comercial, and was later privatised in 1993. At the same time, RDP launched the youth-oriented radio station Antena 3 and abolished advertising from all of its stations, so that the aforementioned broadcasting contribution tax became its sole source of funding.

=== Television ===
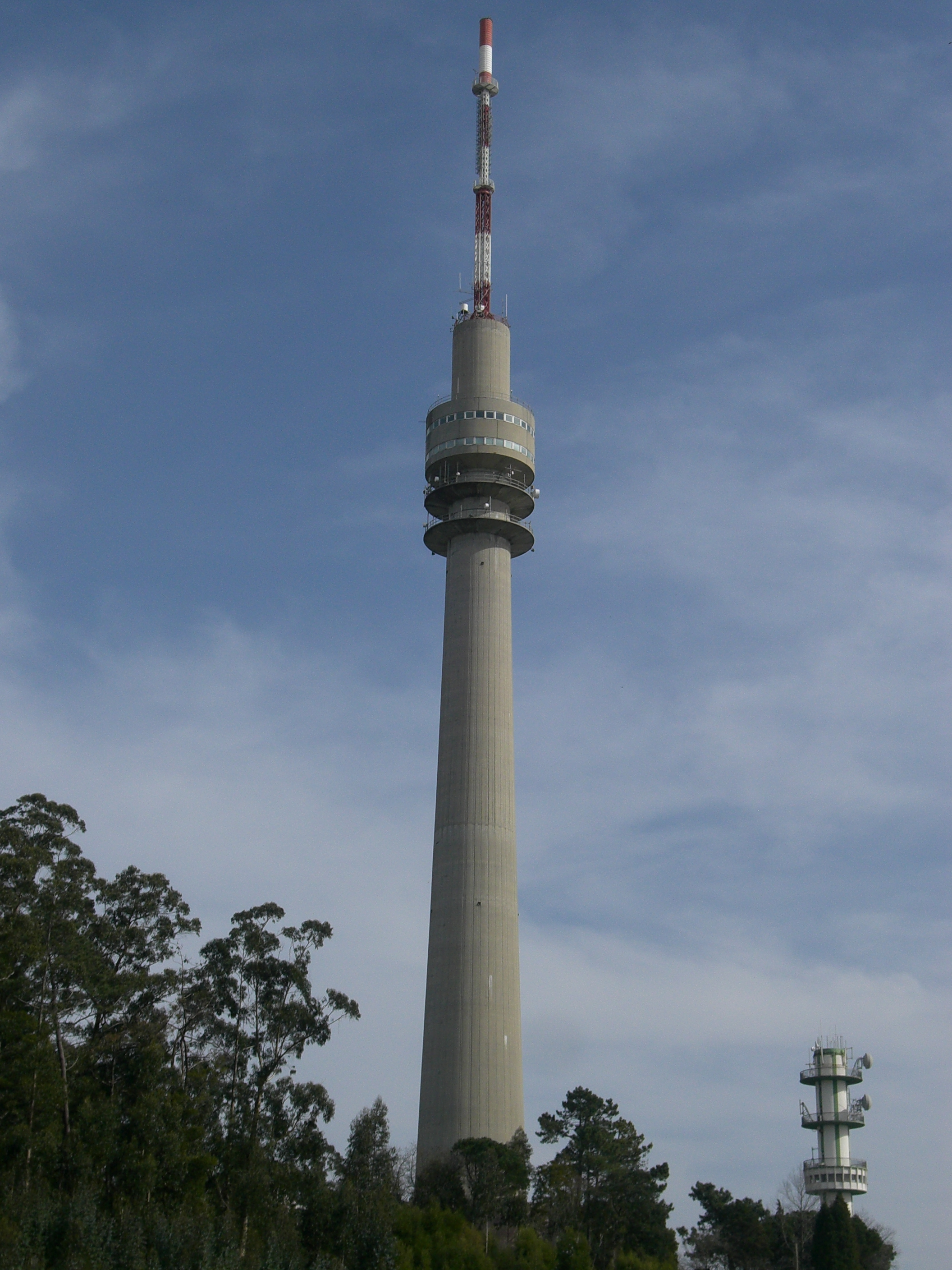
TV tower of RTP Porto studios in Monte da Virgem, Vila Nova de Gaia.

In 1953, a group on behalf of Emissora Nacional de Radiodifusão (later RDP) was set up examining the feasibility of a television service in Portugal. The group started a preliminary work for a network of television signals, with a budget on the order of 500,000 escudos. A foreign company had a proposal for the setup of the television network, including the possibility by a foreign company, with high foreign capital, tasking up a proposal for the building of the network and having the exclusive rights of the selling of television sets in the country for a determined period of time. In July 1954, their report A Televisão em Portugal (Television in Portugal) was published and was built upon the following pillars:

1. The current status of TV and the opportunity for its introduction in Portugal
2. The operating system to be adopted
3. The solution that seems possible
4. Outline of an initial plan and related charges
5. Economic study
6. List of work already carried out by ENR.

Without suspending the activity of the Television Studies Group (while entering a new phase of activity, evolving naturally on the data set gathered), it was nevertheless necessary to wait 6 months for a decisive impulse given to the preliminary work for the installation of the national TV network: a Commission, appointed by Order, was responsible for coordinating and commenting on the studies carried out or to be carried out and defining the scenario in which future broadcasts should take place. This Commission was made up of:

- Brigadier Luís de Pina (former military attaché to the embassies in Washington and London), who presided over it
- António Eça de Queirós
- Engineer Manuel Bivar
- Dr. Stichini Vilela, for Emissora Nacional
- Major Jorge Botelho Moniz, for the private radio stations
- Engineer Carlos Ribeiro
- Dr. Fernando Elói, for the General Administration of Posts, Telegraphs and Telephones

Radiotelevisão Portuguesa (RTP) was established on 15 December 1955 as the national television service, under Article 1 of Decree nº 40 341, as a government limited liability company, under the name of RTP – Radiotelevisão Portuguesa, SARL, with the minimum capital provided for by law, in the amount of 60 million escudos, divided into thirds that fell to the State, the private broadcasters and to the public – this part to be subscribed in shares of 1 000 escudos, for which several banking institutions immediately became responsible.

The following radio stations had shares in RTP (values in thousands of escudos):

- Rádio Clube Português: 9,260
- Rádio Renascença: 4,630
- Emissores do Norte Reunidos: 2,310
- Rádio Clube de Moçambique: 2,310
- Emissores Associados de Lisboa: 1,400
- Rádio Ribatejo: 30
- Rádio Pólo Norte: 30
- Posto Emissor de Radiodifusão do Funchal: 20
- Rádio Clube de Angra: 20

Experimental broadcasts began on 4 September 1956 from the Feira Popular (an entertainment park) experimental studios in Lisbon. Twenty monitors were installed in the park, but crowds gathered in shops around the city. The broadcast was received within a range of about 20 km. Around 1,000 TV sets are sold within a month. The first broadcast was made in association with the O Século newspaper. Intense work was done in the two weeks leading up to the first experimental broadcast.

On 5 December 1956, a contract was signed for the installation of the five transmitters to be built in the first phase of the national television network (dates implied are date of first operation):

- Monsanto (3 December 1956)
- Monte da Virgem (31 December 1957)
- Lousã (23 November 1957)
- Monchique (25 April 1958)
- Montejunto (10 March 1958)

RTP's first yearly report (in 1956) stated that there were difficulties in receiving the terrain to install the television transmitters, a goal RTP wanted to achieve by March 1957.

Regular broadcasting, however, did not start until 7 March 1957, by which time coverage had reached approximately 65% of the Portuguese population. By the end of 1958 the total number of sets in Portugal was around 32,000.

RTP was accepted as a full active member of the European Broadcasting Union (EBU), in 1959.

By the mid-1960s, RTP had become available throughout the country. Robert Farnon's "Derby Day" was extensively used as RTP's fanfare to open the programming since the very first day, and over the decades it has become RTP's official anthem.

A second television channel, RTP2, began operation on 25 December 1968. Two new regional channels were created in 1972 and 1975, for the Portuguese archipelagos of Madeira (opening on 6 August 1972) and the Azores (10 August 1975).

Before the Carnation Revolution, RTP was essentially a mouthpiece of the regime, and famously opened the newscast of 20 July 1969 – the day of the first Moon landing – with a segment showing president Américo Thomaz opening a concrete factory. However, like many other broadcasters, it did broadcast live the landing of the man on the Moon during the night.

The first colour broadcast was made in 1975, with the live coverage of the first parliamentary elections after the Carnation Revolution. However, due to the political turmoil and the economic situation of the country, the colour regular broadcast was delayed several times for nearly 5 years. During that time, RTP started to purchase some colour equipment and make the occasional colour recording. But the pressure kept going as the black and white equipment was getting old and very hard to repair, so in 1978 and 1979, a massive investment into colour broadcasts, supported by a foreign loan, gave RTP the opportunity to replace all the B/W to increase the current amount of equipment and to be updated with the most advanced broadcast technologies available at the time. Despite this, only in February 1980, the government finally authorised the regular colour broadcast and two weeks after, on 7 March, RTP started the regular colour broadcast, with more than 70% of the programmes being already in colour. Also, RTP moved its headquarters to a brand new building. The building was originally built to be converted to a hotel, but the owner decided to leave it untouched and reached an agreement with RTP for the purchase and converted the interior for office use. RTP moved to more adequate headquarters and sold the building in 2003 and the new owner converted into what is today the VIP Grand Lisboa.

The introduction of private television caused great concern within RTP, as it was believed that by losing the monopoly, the corporation was going to lose ad revenue. Numerous female presenters (Maria Elisa, Margarida Marante and Maria Antónia Palla) were fired and caused huge repercussions in the media industry.

Until 1991, RTP owned its transmitter network, which was transferred to a state-owned enterprise which, through a series of mergers, became part of Portugal Telecom. RTP held the television monopoly until 1992, the year when the private SIC (backed by Impresa, TSF, Rádio Comercial, Lusomundo, Expresso, Impala Editores, and the largest commercial TV network in Latin America TV Globo) started broadcasting. Over the years, RTP's audience share has constantly reduced in favour of the private channels. 2007 was an exception to this tendency, and RTP1 became the second most watched channel in Portugal, only behind TVI, a rarity which occurred again in 2009 and 2010.

In 2004, RTP and RDP were organized under a new company and became part of a larger state-owned holding, named Rádio e Televisão de Portugal, SGPS, and inaugurated the new headquarters near Parque das Nações, in Lisbon. In the same year, the second channel was rebranded as '2:', promoting itself as the civil society service. Later in March 2007, 2: became 'RTP2' again. In February 2007 Radiotelevisão Portuguesa SA (the former RTP) and Radiodifusão Portuguesa SA (RDP) were merged into the new Radio e Televisão de Portugal SA, ceasing to be independent entities.

Due to the financial crisis Portugal faced, RTP was to be heavily restructured as part of the Portuguese government's austerity plan between 2011 and 2015 and would have included the sale of one of the free to air channel licenses. However, due to pressure from the public and other organisations, the planned channel privatization never came into effect, although some restructuring took place, namely the phasing out of the international shortwave radio channels.

RTP has 16 regional offices spread all over the country, as well as international bureaus in Washington D.C., Brussels, Moscow, Brazil and several other locations.

RTP aired the 2008 Olympic Games in HD through the ZON TV Cabo satellite and cable platform. On 30 September 2009, RTP 1 HD returned in an experimental broadcast.

As full member of the EBU, RTP is eligible to participate in the Eurovision Song Contest representing Portugal. It took part in the contest for the first time in its ninth edition in 1964. RTP stages Festival da Canção every year to select its entry for the international contest. It has won the competition once: in 2017 with "Amar pelos dois", written by Luísa Sobral and performed by Salvador Sobral. Following this win, RTP staged the 63rd edition, at the Altice Arena in Lisbon on 8, 10, and 12 May 2018. RTP also took part in fifteen (1979–1982 and 1988–1998) of the thirty seasons of the EBU's competition Jeux sans frontières with mixed teams from towns across the country. It won the competition five times: in 1980, 1981, 1988, 1989, and 1997; and staged many heats in outdoor locations around Portugal.

RTP was also member of the Organização da Televisão Ibero-americana (OTI), so it was eligible to participate in the OTI Festival representing Portugal. It took part in the festival for the first time in its first edition in 1972, and participated in twenty-two of the twenty-eight editions. Although it never won the competition, it staged the 16th edition at Teatro São Luiz in Lisbon on 24 October 1987.

=== Post-merger ===
The use of original full names of the radio and television departments (Radiodifusão Portuguesa and Radiotelevisão Portuguesa, respectively) was phased out. The acronym RTP (previously used by the television department) was kept to designate both the whole organization resulting from the merger, as well as to continue to designate its several TV channels. Until 2026, the acronym RDP (previously used by the radio department) was kept by the international radio services (RDP Internacional and RDP África) and regional radio centres (RDP Norte, RDP Centro, RDP Lisboa, RDP Sul, RDP Açores and RDP Madeira).

The new RTP website went live in June 2004.

In 2026, RTP announced that it would phase out the acronym "RDP" used by radio stations and adopt a single "RTP" brand across radio, television, and digital services. The announcement saw the rebranding of RTP Internacional (for television service) and RDP Internacional (for radio service) as RTP Mundo for both radio and television services, while expanding the name of RTP África originally used by television channel to its radio service previously named as RDP África. The rebranding officially took effect on 30 March 2026 at 6:00 a.m. WEST, and saw the removal of antenna symbol, which has been part of RTP's identity in various incarnations since 1957. Ivity Brand Corp, a Portuguese design agency founded by Carlos Coelho, was selected as a agency who designed the rebranding of RTP in November 2024, with the cost of the project was revealed on 6 January 2025 at €70,000, combined with additional cost of €19,000 for the RTP Notícias branding campaign revealed on 21 January 2026, totalling at €89,000. RTP Notícias is the first channel to implement the then-upcoming new logo as part of its rebranding from RTP3 on 12 October 2025. Meanwhile, all radio stations began to include "RTP" prefix on their branding, digital radio stations are remove "Antena 1" and "Antena 2" brands from their respective stations, and RTP's social responsibility RTP+ changed its name as RTP Solidária.

The implementation of the new brand has been criticized by radio staff as an "attack against our identity" (namely RDP's identity), by withdrawing the RDP brand name after fifty years. A protest by RTP radio workers against the phase out of "RDP" branding was held on 30 March 2026.

== Logo history ==
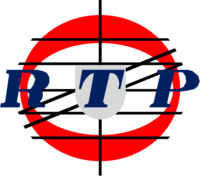
RTP's first, original and old logo used from 7 March 1957 to 1959.

First phase of RTP's second logo used from 1959 to 24 December 1968.

Second phase of RTP's second logo used from 25 December 1968 to 1982.

Third and final phase of RTP's second logo used from 1982 to 29 April 1996.

RTP's third logo used from 29 April 1996 to 30 March 2004.

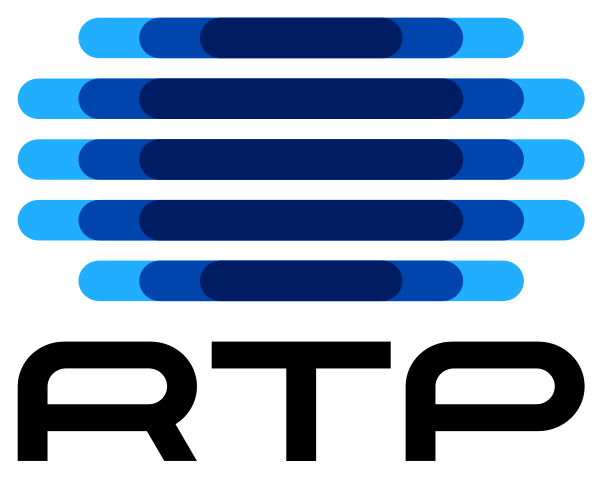
First phase of RTP's fourth logo used from 31 March 2004 to 1 November 2015.

Second phase of RTP's fourth logo from 2 November 2015 to 29 March 2026.

Second phase of RTP's fourth logo with its full name from 2 November 2015 to 29 March 2026.

RTP's fifth logo since 30 March 2026.

RTP's fifth logo since 30 March 2026 (alternate).

== Television channels ==
Logo	Channel	Description	Slogan	Picture format	Launched	Teletext
	RTP1	The oldest of RTP's channels and also the flagship of RTP. It features general programming, such as news, talk shows, current affairs, drama, national and international movies and TV series. (Note: Terrestrial channel available nationwide.) (Note: Available on the Portuguese cable, satellite and IPTV platforms.)	Uma. Por todos (One. For everyone)	16:9 HDTV	7 March 1957	Yes
	RTP2	The main channel for cultural and factual programming, as well as children's programming. It was the first free-to-air TV channel in Portugal to broadcast in 16:9 format.	no slogan	16:9 HDTV	25 December 1968	Yes
	RTP Notícias	24-hour news channel (Note: Available worldwide on satellite and cable platforms.)	Todos. Pela verdade dos factos (Everyone. For truth of facts)	16:9 HDTV	15 October 2001	Yes
	RTP Memória	Broadcasts classic RTP and International shows	Traz pr'á frente (Bring it forward)	16:9 SDTV	4 October 2004	Yes
	RTP Madeira	Regional opt-out channel broadcast in the Madeira Islands	Liga a Madeira ([It] connects Madeira)	16:9 HDTV	6 August 1972	Yes
	RTP Açores	Regional opt-out channel broadcast in the Azores Islands	Unimos as ilhas (We unite the islands)	16:9 HDTV	10 August 1975	Yes
	RTP Mundo	The international television service. In Brazil, Uruguay, United States, Canada, Macau, East Timor and Goa, Daman and Diu it is retransmitted locally, together with local programming	Todos. Em português (Portuguese); Everyone. In Portuguese (English)	16:9 SDTV	10 June 1992	Yes
	RTP África	International television service directed towards the African communities. In Angola, Mozambique, Cape Verde, Guinea-Bissau and São Tomé e Príncipe it is retransmitted locally, together with local programming (Note: Available in several African countries on satellite and cable platforms as well as traditional terrestrial television.)	Muitos povos. Uma língua. (Many peoples. One language.)	16:9 SDTV	7 January 1998	Yes

=== Former channels ===
- RTP Mobile, is a channel adapted to mobile devices. It ended in 2012, with the ascension of mobile apps.
- RTP 4K, which was used to broadcast UEFA Euro 2016 and 2018 FIFA World Cup matches in 4K Ultra HD.

== Radio stations ==
=== National ===
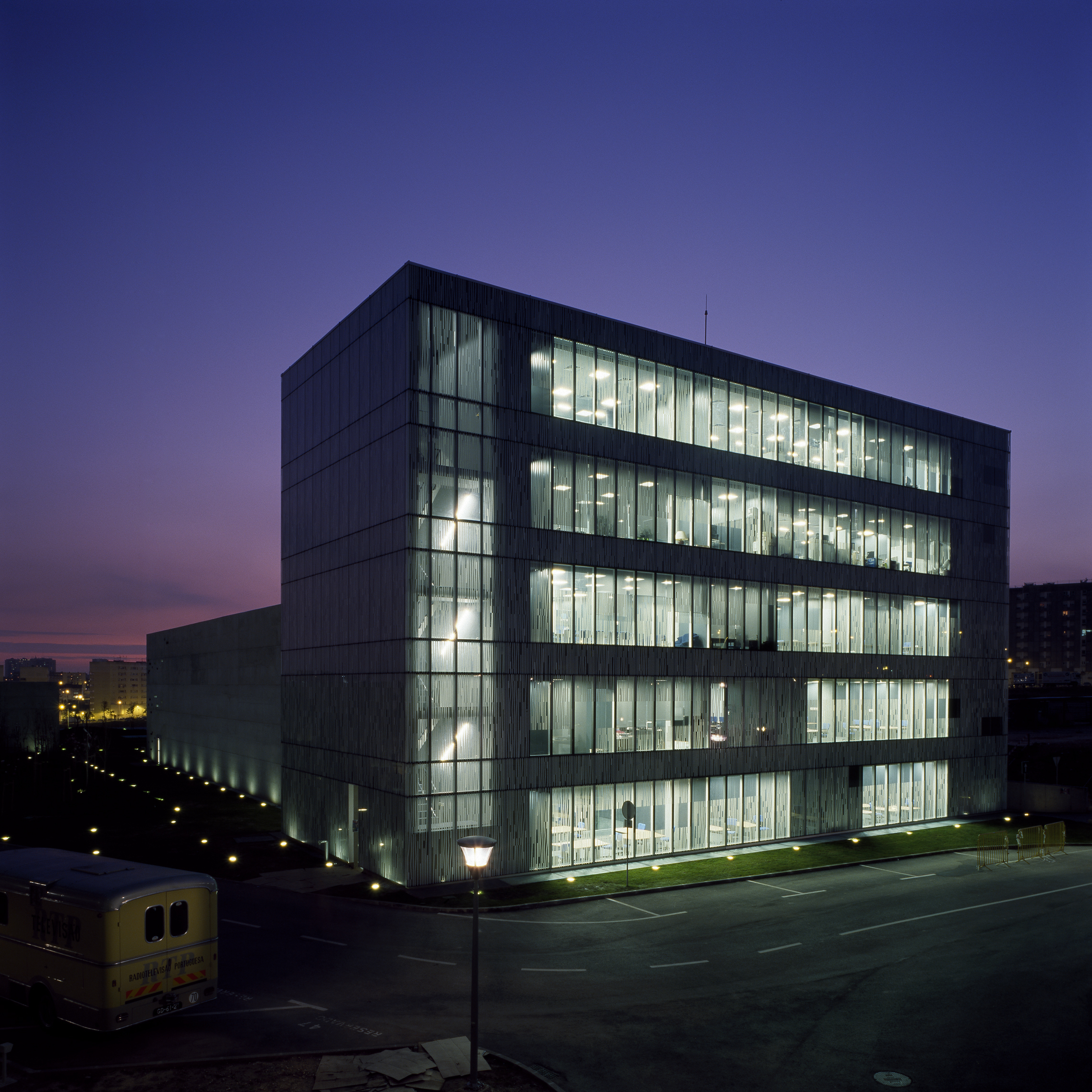
RTP's production center in Lisbon.

- RTP Antena 1, news, talk and sports station with a strong focus on Portuguese music; (Note: Available nationwide on FM and online.) (Note: Also available on AM.) (Note: Available on satellite all over the world.) (Note: Also available throughout Portugal via cable and satellite.)
- RTP Antena 2, cultural programming, classical and world music, featuring live performances;
- RTP Antena 3, an up-tempo, youth-oriented station with focus on contemporary and alternative music;

=== International ===
- RTP Mundo, the international radio service;
- RTP África, programming directed towards the Portuguese-speaking African communities;

=== Digital ===
- RTP Lusitânia, a digital-only station with a focus on Portuguese music; (Note: Available only on the internet.)
- RTP Zig Zag, a digital-only station with a focus on Children's programmes;
- RTP Fado, a digital-only station with a focus on fado;
- RTP Ópera, a digital-only station with a focus on opera music;
- RTP Jazz in, a digital-only station with a focus on jazz music;

=== Regional ===
The following stations are RTP Antena 1 regional stations:

- RTP Norte
- RTP Centro
- RTP Lisboa
- RTP Sul
- RTP Açores
- RTP Madeira

== News services ==
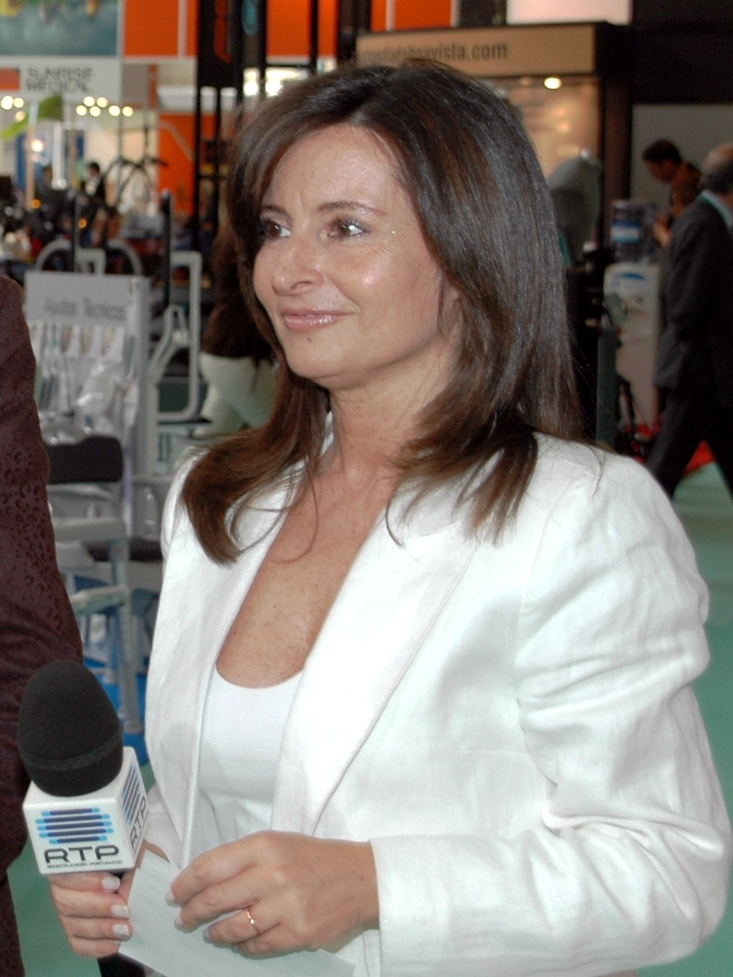
Serenella Andrade, an RTP host and journalist, at Exponor

Most RTP1 news programmes are simulcasted with RTP Mundo, RTP África, and, sometimes, RTP Notícias television channel. These news programs include:

- Bom Dia Portugal (6:00−10 am), live from the Lisbon studios;
- Jornal da Tarde (1 pm), live from the Porto studios;
- Portugal em Rede (5:30 pm), live from the Lisbon studios;
- Telejornal (8 pm), live from the Lisbon studios.

RTP2's only news service is Jornal 2 ('Journal 2' or 'News 2' in English) (9:30 pm), a shorter and a more objective newscast than the RTP1 ones.

RTP Notícias features hourly news updates and headlines.

== Organisation ==
RTP Solidária logo

=== Chairmen of the Board ===
- Almerindo Marques, 2002–2008
- Guilherme Costa, 2008–2012
- Alberto da Ponte, 2012–2015
- Gonçalo Reis, 2015–2020
- Nicolau Santos, 2021–present

=== News Director ===
- José Rodrigues dos Santos, 2001–2004
- António Luís Marinho, 2004–2008
- José Alberto Carvalho, 2008–2011
- Nuno Santos, 2011–2012
- Paulo Ferreira, 2012–2014
- José Manuel Portugal, 2014–2015
- Paulo Dentinho, 2015–2018
- Maria Flor Pedroso, 2018–2020
- António José Teixeira, 2020–present

=== Programming Directors of RTP1 ===
- Nuno Santos, 2002–2007
- José Fragoso, 2008–2011, 2018–
- Hugo Andrade, 2011–2015
- Daniel Deusdado, 2015–2018

=== Programming Directors of RTP2 ===
- Manuel Falcão, 2003–2006
- Jorge Wemans, 2006–2012
- Hugo Andrade, 2012–2014
- Elíseo Oliveira, 2014–2015
- Teresa Paixão, 2015–present

== See also ==
- List of Portuguese language television channels
- Festival da Canção
- Television in Portugal
- Digital television in Portugal
- Sociedade Independente de Comunicação
- Televisão Independente
- Luis Miguel Loureiro, RTP journalist
