= List of Morangos com Açúcar cast members =

Below is a list of Morangos com Açúcar cast members:

Actor	Character	Season
Benedita Pereira	Joana Duarte	Season 1 Summer Season 1 Season 2
João Catarré	Filipe Gomes (Pipo)	Season 1 Summer Season 1 Season 2
Helena Isabel	Teresa Duarte	Season 1 Summer Season 1 Season 2
Luís Esparteiro	Daniel Duarte	Season 1 Summer Season 1
Diogo Martins	Daniel Duarte Jr. (Dani)	Season 1 Summer Season 1 Season 2
Joana Solnado	Catarina Gomes	Season 1 Summer Season 1 Season 2
João Queiroga	Tiago Gomes	Season 1
Carolina Castelinho	Susana Gomes	Season 1 Summer Season 1 Season 2
Diogo Amaral	Ricardo Moura Bastos	Season 1 Summer Season 1
Luís Zagalho	Martim Moura Bastos	Season 1
Rita Salema	Constança Meireles	Season 1 Summer Season 1 Season 2
Patrícia Candoso	Sara Lencastre	Season 1 Summer Season 1 Season 2
Guilherme Filipe	Rogério Sapinho	Season 1 Summer Season 1 Season 2
Dalila Carmo	Madalena Soares	Season 1 Summer Season 1 Season 2
Almeno Gonçalves	Eduardo Madeira	Season 1 Summer Season 1
Carlos Vieira	Nuno Sacramento	Season 1 Summer Season 1 Season 2
Sofia de Portugal	Helena Fernandes	Season 1
Rodrigo Saraiva	Rafael Brandão (Rafa)	Season 1 Summer Season 1 Season 2
Tiago Aldeia	Rodolfo Damião (Rodas)	Season 1 Summer Season 1 Season 2 Summer Season 2
Teresa Tavares	Mónica Rebelo	Season 1 Summer Season 1
Filomena Cautela	Carla Santos Silva	Season 1 Summer Season 1
Ida Roquete	Idalina Santos Silva	Season 1
Núria Real	Patrícia Barros	Season 1 Summer Season 1 Season 2
Sofia Arruda	Lara Queirós	Season 1 Summer Season 1
Manuel Moreira	Rui	Season 1 Summer Season 1 Season 2
João Baptista	Pedro	Season 1 Summer Season 1
Sara Moniz	Matilde	Season 1
Rodrigo Menezes	Gil Sapinho	Season 1
Sylvie Dias	Marina Vicente	Season 1 Season 4
Gustavo Santos	M.C.	Season 1
Jorge Corrula	João	Season 1 Summer Season 1
Marco Costa	John	Season 1
Rui Paulo	Luma	Season 1
Henrique Barradas	Joel	Season 1 Summer Season 1
Carmen Santos	Victória Semedo	Season 1
Luís Gaspar	Durval	Season 1 Season 2 Season 3
Márcia Leal	Paula	Season 1
Marta Gil	Flor	Season 1
Sofia Teodoro	Ângela	Season 1
Maria José Paschoal	Noémia Damião (Rodas's Aunt)	Season 1
Rogério Jacques	José Rebelo (Mónica's Father)	Season 1
Paula Pais	Mónica's Mother	Season 1
Catarina Gonçalves	Sandra	Season 1
Rosa Vinha	Elsa (Sandra's Mother)	Season 1
José Boavida	Armando (Sandra's Father)	Season 1
Filipe Crawford	Custódio Lencastre (Sara's Father)	Season 1
Rita Ruas	Leonor Vilas Boas (Leo)	Season 1 Summer Season 1 Season 2
Luís Vicente	Carlos Vilas Boas	Summer Season 1
Jorge Kapinha	Ricco	Summer Season 1 Season 2
Liliana Santos	Lisa	Summer Season 1
Cristina Cavalinhos	Roberta Sapinho (Bertie)	Summer Season 1
Lurdes Norberto	Violeta Sapinho	Summer Season 1
Hugo Tavares	Salvador	Summer Season 1
Martinho da Silva	Diamantino	Summer Season 1
Nuno Pardal	Gui	Summer Season 1
Olga Diegues	Helga	Summer Season 1
Sílvia Rizzo	Mercês	Summer Season 1
Danae Magalhães	Diana	Summer Season 1
Joana Nunes	Sofia	Summer Season 1 Season 2 Summer Season 2
José Mata	Nelson	Summer Season 1
David Cabecinha	Paulo	Summer Season 1
Matilde Breyner	Mariana	Summer Season 1
António Lima	José Lineu (Zulu)	Summer Season 1 Season 2 Summer Season 2
Carla Salgueiro	Beta	Summer Season 1
Pedro Laginha	Humberto Sérgio	Summer Season 1
Cláudia Vieira	Ana Luísa Rochinha	Season 2 Summer Season 2
Pedro Teixeira	Simão Navarro	Season 2 Summer Season 2
Carlos Areia	Artur Rochinha	Season 2 Summer Season 2
Maria D'Ayres	Ju Rochinha	Season 2
Rita Pereira	Soraia Rochinha	Season 2 Summer Season 2
Diogo Valsassina	Tójó Rochinha	Season 2 Summer Season 2 Season 3
Gabriel Cândido	Gonçalo Rochinha (Gongas)	Summer Season 1 Season 2 Summer Season 2
Carlos Mendes	José Luís Navarro	Season 2 Summer Season 2
Joana Sanches	Vanda Navarro	Season 2
Ana Guiomar	Marta Navarro (Mitó)	Summer Season 1 Season 2 Summer Season 2 Season 3
Hélio Pestana	Henrique Batista	Season 2 Summer Season 2
Cláudia Cadima	Carmo Batista	Season 2 Summer Season 2
Paulo Matos	Mário Batista	Season 2 Summer Season 2
Raul Abrantes	João Batista	Season 2 Summer Season 2
Marta Ramos	Mafalda Batista	Season 2 Summer Season 2
Mafalda Pinto	Carlota Antunes	Season 2 Summer Season 2
Catarina Avelar	Prazeres Antunes	Season 2 Summer Season 2
David Persone Non Grate	Miguel Antunes	Season 2
Melanie Santos	Caty Antunes	Season 2
Rita Viegas	Vicky	Season 2 Summer Season 2
Angélico Vieira	David Barros (Mr. D)	Season 2 Summer Season 2 Season 3 Summer Season 3
Joana Borja	Lola Barros	Season 2
Ana Catarina Afonso	Rosete	Season 2
Patrícia Tavares	Bárbara Pinheiro	Season 2 Summer Season 2
Jenny Romero]	Jessica	Season 2 Summer Season 2
Ana Rita Tristão	Inês	Season 2 Summer Season 2
Marta Melro	Xana	Season 2 Summer Season 2
Vítor Fonseca	Zé Milho	Season 2 Summer Season 2 Season 3 Summer Season 3
Paulo Vintém	Topê	Season 2 Summer Season 2 Season 3 Summer Season 3
Edmundo Vieira	Ruca	Season 2 Summer Season 2 Season 3 Summer Season 3
Raquel Serafim	Kika	Season 2
Dânia Neto	Maria Vicente	Season 2 Summer Season 2 Season 3
Adelaide Ferreira	Dádá	Season 2 Summer Season 2
José Meireles	Joca	Season 2 Summer Season 2
Tiago Castro	Crómio	Season 2 Summer Season 2 Season 3 Summer Season 3 Season 4
Estrela Novais	Ester	Season 2
José Afonso Pimentel	Hugo	Season 2
Luís Verissimo	André	Season 2
Susana Almeida	Amélia	Season 2 Summer Season 2
Maria Sampaio	Liliana	Season 2 Summer Season 2
Sofia Grelo	Wei Mim	Season 2 Summer Season 2 Season 3
Peter Michael	Rodrigo	Season 2
Juan Gabriel Saltilho	Inspector Costa	Season 2
Laura Soveral	Madame Josephine	Season 2
Anabela Moreira	Laura	Season 2
Nuno Soares Franco	Vasco	Season 2
Francisco Adam	Bernardino Esteves (Dino)	Season 2 Summer Season 2 Season 3
Inês Castel-Branco	Alice Esteves	Summer Season 2 Season 3
Paulo Rocha	Frederico Oliveira (Fred)	Summer Season 2 Season 3
Mariana Pacheco	Teresa Oliveira (Teresinha)	Summer Season 2 Season 3
Madalena Brandão	Filipa	Summer Season 2
João Leiria	Jorge Novais	Summer Season 2
Patrícia Coriel	Gabi	Summer Season 2
Cátia Nunes	Magda	Summer Season 2
Ricardo Amorim	Gaspar	Summer Season 2
Florbela Oliveira	Lulu	season 2 and season summer 2
Filipe Salgueiro	Luís Alvarenga	Summer Season 2
Paulo Pascoal	Luca	Summer Season 2
Alexandre da Silva	Dinis	Summer Season 2
Joana Duarte	Matilde Gouveia	Season 3 Summer Season 3
Luís Lourenço	Tiago Borges	Season 3 Summer Season 3
Isabel Medina	Helena Gouveia	Season 3
Rui Madeira	Luís Gouveia	Season 3
Mariana Monteiro	Beatriz Gouveia (Bia)	Season 3 Summer Season 3
Tiago Felizardo	Manuel Gouveia (Manel)	Summer Season 2 Season 3 Summer Season 3 Season 4
Sónia Brazão	Julieta Borges	Season 3 Summer Season 3 Season 4
Jorge Silva	Sebastião Rodrigues	Season 3 Summer Season 3
João André	Francisco Borges (Kiko)	Season 3
Filipa Oliveira	Catarina Rodrigues	Season 3 Summer Season 3
Salvador Vargas	Gil Rodrigues	Season 3 Summer Season 3
Ana Zanatti	Maria José Campos	Season 3 Summer Season 3 Season 4
Francisco Côrte-Real	Afonso Campos	Season 3 Summer Season 3 Season 4
Sara Prata	Rebeca Campos (Becas)	Season 3 Summer Season 3 Season 4
Fernando Fernandes	Tomé Campos (FF)	Season 3 Summer Season 3 Season 4
Paula Neves	Vera Xavier	Season 3 Summer Season 3
Marta Faial	Daniela Xavier	Season 3 Summer Season 3 Season 4
Rúben Gomes	Diogo Castro	Season 3 Summer Season 3
Oceana Basílio	Carla Mergulhão	Season 3 Summer Season
Ciomara Morais	Salomé	Season 3
Francisco Froes	Michael	Season 3
Helena Costa	Mónica Mello Teixeira	Season 3 Summer Season
Jessica Athayde	Mimi (Maria Micaela Silva)	Season 3 Summer Season 3 Season 4
João Pedro Sousa	Nelson Pereira	Season 3
Miguel Bogalho	Cristiano Jesus	Season 3 Summer Season 3
Diana Chaves	Susana Lopes	Season 3 Summer Season 3
Inês Simões	Cláudia	Season 3
Rui Luís Brás	Jorge	Season 3
Carla Bolão	Vânia Campos	Season 3
Custódia Gallego	Cecília Oliveira	Season 3
Francisco Borges	Jota (João Joaquim Paulino)	Season 3 Summer Season 3 Season 4
Nelson Chulo	Link (Luís Soares)	Season 3 Summer Season 3 Season 4
David Gama	Sérgio	Season 3 Summer Season 3 Season 4
Luke D'Eça	Ed	Season 3 Summer Season 3 Season 4
António Cordeiro	Álvaro Paes	Season 3 Summer Season 3
Cláudia Chéu	Dora/Pedro Paes	Season 3 Summer Season 3
Sofia Croix	Diana Morais	Season 3 Summer Season 3 Season 4
Margarida Martinho	Rita	Season 3 Summer Season 3 Season 4
Mariana Martinho	Sílvia	Season 3 Summer Season 3 Season 4
Tiago Carreira	Lourenço	Season 3 Summer Season 3 Season 4
Ana Rita Luz	Francisca	Season 3
Ana Brito e Cunha	Juliana	Season 3
Simone de Oliveira	Maria Antónia Mergulhão	Season 3
Manuel Sá Pessoa	André	Season 3
Raul Solnado	Nicolau	Season 3
Afonso Vilela	Rui Borges	Season 3
Tina Barbosa	Olimpia	Season 3
Rui Pedro Cardoso	Tupac	Season 3
Carlos Costa	Petit	Season 3
Paulo Gonçalves	Fonseca	Season 3
António Marques	Cabral	Season 3
Patrícia Brito e Cunha	Isabel	Season 3
Luís Alberto	Vicente Jesus	Season 3 Summer Season 3
Sandra B.	Rosa Lopes	Season 3
Julie Sargeant	Iva	Season 3
Diogo Fera	Fera	Season 3
Duarte Vítor	Valdemar Matoso	Season 3
Catarina Morazzo	Isabel	Summer Season 3
Daniel Cardoso	Guga	Summer Season 3
Elisa Lisboa	Henriqueta Baleizão	Summer Season 3
Henrique Viana	Inácio Baleizão	Summer Season 3
Victória Guerra	Rute Baleizão	Summer Season 3 Season 4
João Pinto	Nuno Baleizão	Summer Season 3
Fátima Luzes	Elsa	Season 4
Mafalda Santos	Dra. Mafalda	Season 4
Lia Gama	Vitória Torres	Season 4
Irene Cruz	Palmira Antunes	Season 4
Joana Figueira	Fernanda Correia	Season 4
Petra Camacho	Joana	Season 4
Sofia Mano	Leonor Ortigão	Season 4
Tomás Santos	David	Season 4
Guilherme Barroso	Rodrigo	Season 4
Paulo Teixeira	Lúcio	Season 4
Marina Albuquerque	Clara	Season 4
Carlos Aurélio	Joel Mendes (Angelina's Father)	Season 4
Antonio Camelier	Gonçalo	Season 4
Miguel Nunes	Duarte	Season 4
Pedro Caeiro	Rui	Season 4
Joana De Verona	Adriana	Season 4
Sara Salgado	Filipa	Season 4
Filipa Areosa	Ana Rita	Season 9
Luís Garcia	Bryan	Season 9
Tiago Costa	Ricardo Alves	Season 9
Marta Andrino	Verónica	Season 9
Mikaela Lupu	Teresa	Season 9
