= Santa Bárbara (TV series) =

- "Nem tudo o que brilha é ouro" (Portuguese) "Not everything that shines is gold" (English)
- Genre: Romance, Melodrama, Mystery
- Created by: Artur Ribeiro
- Developed by: Plural Entertainment
- Directed by: Hugo de Sousa
- Starring: Benedita Pereira; Albano Jerónimo; São José Correia (see more)
- Opening theme: Toma Conta de Mim by Pedro Abrunhosa
- Ending theme: Toma Conta de Mim by Pedro Abrunhosa
- Country of origin: Portugal
- Original language: Portuguese
- No. of episodes: 271

Production
- Running time: 45min

Original release
- Network: TVI
- Release: September 28, 2015 – October 1, 2016

Related
- Jardins Proibidos; A Impostora; La dueña (1984); Dueña y señora (2006); La Patrona (MX–2013)

Santa Bárbara (English: Saint Barbara) is a Portuguese telenovela broadcast and produced by TVI. It is written by Artur Ribeiro and adapted from the Venezuelan telenovela La Dueña. The telenovela premiered on September 28, 2015 and is currently airing at 11pm (UTC) primetime slot. It is recorded in the north region of Portugal.

== Production ==
The telenovela was first announced in November 2014 when Artur Ribeiro was reported to be the author of another new telenovela of TVI. The telenovela was supposed to premiere in March 2015. Days after, came the first hints that it would be an adaptation of a Mexican telenovela and La Patrona was the chosen one.

Margarida Marinho was the first actress reported to participate in the telenovela, in the role of Antónia Vidal, one of the main characters of the original plot. But later she moved to the rival broadcaster SIC. Sara Matos and Pedro Teixeira were also actors thought to be part of the telenovela but were never confirmed. Finally, in 2015, Benedita Pereira and Albano Jerónimo were announced as protagonists (Gabriela and Alexandre). In February, São José Correia replaced Margarida Marinho's original role on the telenovela (Antónia Vidal). At that moment, she was still recording the telenovela Jardins Proibidos and TVI had to make some changes so she could abandon that production and join the cast of this one.

Also in February, the telenovela received its first title, Santa Bárbara, which was later announced to be the official one. Santa Bárbara originates from the actual spiritual figure Saint Barbara, believed to be the protector of the miners, which is one of the main plots. The premiere was then delayed to September because TVI extended the length of Jardins Proibidos (on air at that time). TVI tried to convince Joaquim de Almeida to join the cast. This actor is popular worldwide for acting in several TV series such as Revenge, Once Upon a Time, Bones, Miami Vice, etc.. Unfortunately, he wasn't able to accept it but promised a cameo role with the main character Marcelo Vidal.

On April 28, there was a special event to show the entire cast and reveal the first details. It was the first public and official announcement of the production.

Shooting starts only in July and takes place in the north region of Portugal. Just like Belmonte, from the same author, the Portuguese version of La Patrona has a lot of differences from the original one, but always keeping the core of the story.

"It's the story of a female miner that will have to come face to face with one of the most powerful and machiavellian woman ever seen on TV"

— Artur Ribeiro, author of the telenovela

The first teasers were launched in August. Another special event (this time to see exclusive parts of the first episodes) took place on September 18, 10 days before the premiere.

Just like the original La Patrona, the first episode of Santa Bárbara ends after the gold mine collapses and Gabriela and Alexandre get caught, leaving the episode in a cliffhanger.

The telenovela is separated in two phases that will mark a major turnaround in Gabriela and a temporal transition of six years. Santa Bárbara has the hard task to maintain the high ratings left by the previous telenovela Jardins Proibidos.

== Plot ==
From the depths of the earth to the heights of high society, Santa Bárbara is the story of Gabriela (Benedita Pereira), a young woman whom everything is taken and returns to regain it all. At the same time, is the story of a forgotten Portuguese town from the inside that will find a new lease with the reopening of ancient gold mines. Just like the protagonist, who will pass the largest adversities in search of a lost love, also the town of Santa Bárbara will be the center of all the events and all the loves and hatreds, conflicts and dreams, dramas and happiness.

=== Phase 1 ===
The fictional town of Santa Bárbara, once consigned to oblivion, is again on the map with the official reopening of its old gold mines, operated by a consortium led by the powerful Antónia Vidal (São José Correia), a woman who rose in life at the cost of two marriages that ended badly for both husbands - the first died in an accident at the very least suspect and the current dies at her hands, shortly after the opening of the mine that is now under the exclusive control of Antónia and her obsessions.

However, with the death of the patriarch, Alexandre (Albano Jerónimo), the stepson of Antónia who lived in Porto, returns to Santa Bárbara. If the circumstances of this visit would be only for his father's funeral, when Alexandre knows Gabriela, a young woman working in the gold mine, everything will change. Especially when the two are trapped in a mine tunnel after a collapse, where the fact of both running risk of death will link them forever.

The love that grows between Alexandre and Gabriela will be put to the test when Antónia starts machiavelically conspire the destruction of the miner, who will be incriminated and forcibly sent to a mental institution after an explosion at the mine that not only costs life to his own father but also Fernando (Carlotto Cotta), the only son of Antónia, the true responsible for this fatality. Separated from Alexandre and her son, David (Gonçalo Oliveira), alone and with no apparent chance to continue her life in that town, unless closed in an asylum, Gabriela will have to run away and disappear.

=== Phase 2 ===
Six years later, Santa Bárbara is unrecognizable. With a golf course and a luxury hotel, repopulated with a young and enterprising population, with rural tourism, archaeological museum of ancient Roman mines, river beaches with water sports and large high-class holiday houses. And it is to this new Santa Bárbara that an equally new Gabriela returns.

After years abroad where she won a fortune, Gabriela is back, determined not only to seek vengeance of Antónia but also to restore justice and peace in the town, without forgetting Alexandre and the hope to regain her lost love.

== Cast ==
=== Main ===
- Benedita Pereira - Gabriela Soares
- Albano Jerónimo - Alexandre Vidal
- São José Correia - Antónia Vidal

=== Secondary ===
- Carlotto Cotta - Fernando Beltrão
- Diana Costa e Silva - Irene Montemor
- Catarina Wallenstein - Júlia Montemor
- Anabela Brígida - Aida Rodrigues
- Luís Gaspar - Macário
- António Capelo - Adriano Viegas
- Luísa Cruz - Constança Monte Claro Viegas
- Pedro Caeiro - Ricardo Viegas
- Filomena Cautela - Maria Ana Rodrigues
- Luís Esparteiro - Júlio Montemor
- Susana Arrais - Francisca Magalhães
- Diego Ramos - Léon Mélendez "léon Suares"
- Manuela Couto - Paula Montemor
- Gabriela Barros - Patrícia Montemor
- João Lagarto - Zacarias Neves
- Cristina Homem de Mello - Teresa Neves
- Tiago Felizardo - Manuel Neves
- David Carreira - André Neves
- Anna Eremin - Rute Gomes
- Paula Lobo Antunes - Luísa Áquila
- Carla Vasconcelos - Rosa Romeiro
- Romeu Costa - Bernardo Almeida
- Sofia Grillo - Filipa Vieira
- Nuno Pardal - Alberto Espinho
- Marco D'Almeida - Gonçalo Góis
- Pedro Laginha - Eduardo Reis
- Marco Delgado - Rui Lagos
- Catarina Gouveia - Alice Oliveira
- Manuela Maria - Felismina Oliveira
- Jessica Athayde - Ana da Luz
- Almeno Gonçalves - Tomás Soares
- Carlos Oliveira - Vitó Cabral (phase 1)
- Afonso Pimentel - Daniel Figueiredo (phase 2)
- Sofia Ribeiro - Jéssica Garcia (phase 2)
- Jean-Pierre Martins - Olivier Lencastre (phase 2)
- Miguel Taborda - David Soares (phase 2)
- Bruna Quintas - Sara Faria (phase 2)
- José Condessa - Luís (phase 2)
- Jack Ilco - Zeca (phase 2)

=== Special Participation ===
- Joaquim de Almeida - Marcelo Vidal (first episode)

=== Children ===
- Gonçalo Oliveira - David Soares (phase 1)
- Sara Mestre - Marisa Vasques (phase 1)

== Remakes ==
- 1984: La dueña (filmed in Venezuela and broadcast on VTV Canal 8)
- 2006: Dueña y Señora (filmed in Puerto Rico and broadcast on Telemundo) starring Karla Monroig & Angel Viera
- 2013: La Patrona (filmed in Mexico and broadcast on NBC)
- 2023: Minas de pasión (filmed in Mexico and broadcast on Las Estrellas)
