= Doida Por Ti =

Portuguese telenovela

- Written by: Maria João Mira
- Starring: Sara Matos; João Catarré; Vera Kolodzig; Afonso Pimentel
- Theme music composer: Expensive Soul
- Opening theme: O Amor É Magico
- Country of origin: Portugal
- Original language: Portuguese
- No. of episodes: 254

Original release
- Network: TVI
- Release: October 24, 2012 – March 14, 2014

Doida por ti (English: Mad about you) is a Portuguese telenovela broadcast by TVI. It was written by Maria João Mira, the working title of the series was Lua de Papel (Paper Moon). Doida Por Ti premiered on October 24, 2012. Originally, it ran from Monday to Friday in the hour preceding the news program Jornal das 8, the time slot previously reserved for Morangos com Açúcar. As of September 2013, with the launch of TVI's new telenovela, I Love It, the schedule was reduced to only one episode per week airing on Saturday nights. The series returned to its daily run, although moved towards midnight, on February 6, 2014, and aired its final episode on March 14, 2014.

== Plot ==
Olívia is in love with Miguel, who she thinks is the man of her dreams, though she hardly knows him. In fact, Miguel is a playboy who keeps secret romances with Bianca (his brother's bride) and other women. Bianca is also mad about Miguel. Her planned marriage to David, Miguel's brother, is kind of a business deal between their two families. David is not mad about anyone. He never had time for these things, he always wanted to be a well-behaved child who did what was expected of him. Accordingly, he agreed upon marrying Bianca because he was supposed to.

In the first episode, Miguel becomes the victim of an attack that nearly kills him. He is saved by Olívia, who seems to have accomplished her wish to be close to him. Miguel remains in a coma for some time and is brought home to his parents in this state. Since Olívia was his savior and visited him in the hospital, Miguel's family takes her for his girlfriend. In reality, Olívia does not know him personally, but her attempts to tell the truth are constantly interrupted. So she becomes part of the family and even receives the possible engagement ring that is found in Miguel's flat. This part of the story seems to be inspired by the 1995 movie While You Were Sleeping.

Bianca is jealous of Olívia and sneaks her way into her home, pretending that she is escaping a domestic violence situation. She introduces herself as Susana and is offered to stay at Olívia's house. Eventually, Olívia admits that she is not engaged to Miguel. Bianca secretly taped this confession, reveals herself as Bianca, David's fiancée, and blackmails Olívia: Either she disappears and leaves the Campelo family alone, or she will take the taped confession to the police. (episode 9) At first, Olívia seems to comply, but then she appears at the house of the Campelo family and confesses. The family is about to expel her for good when finally Miguel awakens from his coma (episode 11). Funnily enough, he seems to recognize Olívia all of a sudden. Although he just remembers her from her job as a waitress, he learns that she had saved his life and tells everybody that she is, in fact, his fiancée. However, this is just another one of his tricks, he notices how well this story works with his parents and sticks to it while continuing his affair with Bianca.

The aftereffects of the Portuguese financial crisis are also present in the series. Carlos Cardoso loses his job and faces unemployment, he and his family are temporarily evicted from their home. Originally, Carlos is an enfermeiro (male nurse) and after another dubious temporary job (as a stripper in a nightclub) he applies for a position at the house of the rich Campelo family, who are looking for a personal (female) nurse. He uses the Mrs. Doubtfire routine, dresses up as a woman and, under the name of Carlota Rufino, gets the job. Carlos's telling signature tune is Um Dia Mau (A Bad Day).

== Cast ==
- Sara Matos - Olívia Pimenta
- João Catarré - David Campelo
- Vera Kolodzig - Bianca Pessoa
- Afonso Pimentel - Miguel Campelo
- António Capelo - Leonardo Campelo
- Rita Ribeiro - Gisela Campelo
- Júlia Belard - Gabriela Matos
- Paulo Pires - Mário Varela
- Luísa Cruz - Carmo Varela
- Sara Barros Leitão - Joana Varela
- João Lagarto - Abel Antunes
- Manuela Couto - Preciosa Antunes
- André Nunes - Carlos Cardoso / Carlota Rufino
- Patrícia Tavares - Soraia Antunes
- Rodrigo Paganelli - Rui Cardoso
- Filomena Gonçalves - Marília Gomes
- Gabriela Barros - Vanessa Rufino
- Marta Andrino - Eduarda Gomes
- Fernando Luís - Samuel Galhardo
- Sílvia Rizzo - Rita Galhardo
- João Pacheco - Martim Galhardo
- Vítor Fonseca - Fernando Saraiva
- Lourenço Ortigão - Alberto Lopes
- Núria Madruga - Tânia Ferreira
- Ana Catarina - Rute Serafim
- Almeno Gonçalves - Vasco Pimenta
