= I Can't Live Without You in This Town =

Song by Slimmy

from the album Be Someone Else
- Language: English
- Released: June 14, 2010 (promo)
- Recorded: 2009: Estúdios da Aguda, Portugal
- Genre: Soft rock, electronic rock
- Length: 3:56
- Label: iPlay
- Songwriter: Paulo Fernandes
- Producers: Quico Serrano, Mark Turner

"I Can't Live Without You In This Town" is a song by Portuguese recording artist Slimmy from his second studio album, Be Someone Else (2010). It was written by Slimmy (later produced by Quico Serrano and Mark Turner when Slimmy started working on the album with them by the third quarter of 2009, when "I Can't Live Without You In This Town" was recorded), while Slimmy was on road for "Sex and Love Tour". "I Can't Live Without You In This Town" was inspired by a girl Slimmy met in Texas in 2004. The song was featured on the eighth season of the Portuguese TV series Morangos com Açúcar in 2011.

"I Can't Live Without You In This Town" is an electronic rock ballad, influenced by soft rock music. "I Can't Live Without You In This Town" also features electronic beats and a soft-rock influenced breakdown. The lyrics are about Slimmy's deep love with a girl that Slimmy can't live without with. The song received mostly positive reviews from critics, with most of them describing the chorus as "very memorable". After the release of Be Someone Else, "I Can't Live Without You In This Town" peaked at number 152 at the Metropolis Chart. Slimmy performed the song during his "A Very Slimmy Tour" and "Be Someone Else Tour". He also performed the song in other music festivals.

== Background ==
Slimmy started working on the album with his longtime producers Quico Serrano and Mark Turner by the third quarter of 2009, when "I Can't Live Without You In This Town" was recorded. Saul Davies was first set to be the producer of the album and song, however, Davies was on tour with the band James at the time, making such collaboration impossible. Other musicians joined Slimmy for the recording of the song: Paulo Garim in the bass and Tó-Zé in the drums, who already worked with slimmy in Beatsound Loverboy, and Gustavo Silva, in the keyboards and Daniel Santos in the guitar as guest musicians.

In an interview with Susana Faria of JPN, Slimmy defined the album as "freedom, with a bit of "teasing" and "sexual", an album full of strong songs dedicated to my fans", he also mentioned that "I Can't Live Without You In This Town" was dedicated to a girl he met in 2004.

== Composition ==
The album is essentially a rock album, a completely opposite of Beatsound Loverboy, which features a more electronic sound, keeping, however, the same connection between rock and electro music, where "I Can't Live Without You In This Town" marks a big difference from other tracks, since it is the only ballad in the album.

"I Can't Live Without You In This Town", an electronic rock ballad, influenced by soft rock music. "I Can't Live Without You In This Town" also features electronic beats and a soft-rock influenced breakdown. The lyrics are about Slimmy's deep love with a girl that Slimmy can't live without with. The song is dedicated to a girl Slimmy met in Texas in 2004.

== Release and reception ==
The song is available for digital purchase at Amazon since June 14, 2010. Upon its release, the song received positive reviews from critics. While reviewing the album, Ágata Ricca from Palco Principal stated that "it marks the difference with the previous one, due to Slimmy's mature and reflective attitude" and that the song and album do not "change Slimmy's past, it just emphasize it and strengthen it". Ágata Ricca praised the song for its markable difference from the other tracks, calling the chorus of the song memorable. She also said that it was different from other tracks of the album, which more are pretty "danceable". Despite not being released as an official single, "I Can't Live Without You in This Town" charted at number 152 at the Metropolis Chart, and it was featured on the eighth season of the Portuguese soap opera Morangos com Açúcar.

== Live performances ==
The first promotional concert for "Be Someone Else" took place at the Cidade do Porto Shopping on March 26, 2010, where Slimmy sang a few songs from his album, including "I Can't Live Without You In This Town". Slimmy also promoted his song in Albufeira, at the Algarve Shopping's Fnac on November 27, 2010. Slimmy's next significant promotion marked the beginning of "A Very Slimmy Tour", where Slimmy performed songs from his two albums, including "I Can't Live Without You In This Town". The tour started on February 18, 2011, at the Kastrus River Klub in Esposende and ended on April 30, 2011, at the Pitch Club in Porto. Slimmy's "Be Someone Else Tour", where Slimmy performed the songs a lot of times, began on May 6, 2011, with its opening show at the Academy Week in Mirandela. Slimmy also performed the song at the Queima das Fitas in Viana do Castelo on May 15, 2011.

== Credits and personnel ==
- Slimmy – songwriter, guitar, producer, and vocals
- Quico Serrano – recording, mixing
- Mark Turner – recording, producer
- Paulo Garim – bass
- Tó-Zé – drums
- Gustavo Silva – keyboards
- Daniel Santos – guitar

Credits adapted from Be Someone Else album liner notes.

== Charts ==
Chart (2010)	Peak position
Metropolis Chart (Portugal)	152

== Release history ==
Region	Date	Label	Format	Edition(s)
Worldwide (Amazon)	June 14, 2010	iPlay, Som E Imagem Lda.	Digital download	Promotional single
