= Florbela (given name) =

Florbela is a feminine given name.

== List of people with the given name ==
- Florbela Espanca (1894–1930), Portuguese poet
- Florbela Malaquias (born 1959), Angolan politician
- Florbela Oliveira (born 1974), Portuguese actress

== See also ==
- Florbela, 2012 Portuguese film
