= Beatsound Loverboy =

Studio album by Slimmy
- Released: September 17, 2007
- Recorded: 2002–2007
- Genre: Electronic rock
- Length: 38:53
- Label: Som Livre
- Producer: Mark J Turner; Saul Davies; Quico Serrano; Rodolfo Cardoso

Slimmy chronology
Beatsound Loverboy (2007)	Slimmy Unplugged (2008)

Singles from Beatsound Loverboy
- 1. "Beatsound Loverboy" Released: September 6, 2007; 2. "Show Girl" Released: May 26, 2008; 3. "You Should Never Leave Me (Before I Die)" Released: November 25, 2008

Beatsound Loverboy is the debut studio album by Portuguese singer-songwriter Slimmy. Slimmy started working on the album with his longtime producers Quico Serrano and Mark J Turner. Other two producers joined Slimmy for the recording of the album: Saul Davies and Rodolfo Cardoso. The relationship between Slimmy and the other producers was always good and Slimmy feels that that provided a good production for the album. He mentioned that he started to compose and write songs in 2000, than record them and play them alive. However, the project only began to take concrete steps, when Slimmy, in 2004, moved to London. The album was released on September 17, 2007 in Portugal. The album was released in two formats: the physical edition, featuring 11 tracks; and the digital edition also featuring 11 tracks. In summer 2007 Slimmy returned to Portugal to promote his projects because he felt that he wasn't recognized in his country.

Slimmy said that "honestly, I think it came out better. During these years there were many times when I hesitated whether I was going in the right direction if that was where I wanted to be, but then when I saw the final product and liked it, it had a minimal importance. Honestly, I like to listen to my music. The work exceeded my expectations." The album is essentially an electronic rock album. It has a lot of "rock attitude". Slimmy declared that he wanted to explore more things about electronic music and wanted to work with an English producer in the album, Mark Turner, which, according to Slimmy, gave "a different glow to the album". "Beatsound Loverboy" was also voted the 3rd best national album of the past 15 years, the choice made by Antena 3 listeners, who decided to mark the 15th anniversary choosing from a list of 100, 15 albums representative, between 1994 and 2009 by several generations of national music. His work was filled with the nominations for "Golden Globe Newcomer of the Year" category and for the "MTV Europe Music Awards" in the category of "Best Portuguese Act".

Slimmy's most significant promotion marked the beginning of "Sex and Love Tour", starting in February 2008 at the "Industrial Nightclub" in Porto. As part of the promotion process, several songs were used as part of soundtracks of TV series or TV advertisements. Three singles were released from the album, both of them managed to enter the Portugal Singles Top 50 Chart. Critical response to the album was generally mixed, with critics praising Quico Serrano and Mark Turner's polished production. Blitz, however, gave the album a more mixed review. "Beatsound Loverboy" was a commercial disappointment, the album didn't manage to chart on any official chart company to date. Four music videos were released from the album: "Beatsound Loverboy", "Show Girl", "Bloodshot Superstar" and "You Should Never Leave Me (Before I Die)".

== Background ==
In 2000, Slimmy began to "flesh out a dream". He started to compose and write songs, than record them and play them alive. However, the project only began to take concrete steps, when Slimmy, in 2004 (with some already recorded songs produced by Rodolfo Cardoso, Quico Serrano and Saul Davies, a member of the band James), moved to London. Slimmy had the opportunity to tour with Electric 6 in 2004 and record a demo album in 2005, to serve as background to "Beatsound Loverboy".

"After nearly four years, four different producers, two cities and two different studios, finally we have the first album" said Slimmy in an interview with Se7e Magazine, he also cited that "All these years the project has been supported by me in technical terms. Than, we [the band] moved to London, where we mixed the concerts with the studio." In summer 2007 Slimmy returned to Portugal to promote his projects because he felt that he wasn't recognized in his country.

== Development ==
=== Recording and production ===
Slimmy performing during the "Sex and Love Tour", on July 18, 2008.

In an interview with Se7e Magazine, Slimmy declared that he and Quico Serrano already had a few tracks recorded before Slimmy moved to London. There, Slimmy started making concerts, what slowed down the production process. Slimmy declared that he wanted to explore more things about electronic music and wanted to work with an English producer in the album, Mark J Turner, which, according to Slimmy, gave "a different glow to the album". Most songs in the album are re-recordings, which were originally recorded between 2002 and 2005, which suffered changes to improve their sound quality, he said: "I do not see that there were major changes, because I'm always writing. There were three songs made last year and others made in 2002, but there was no intention to change, only to improve and explore new sounds and instruments in London." Slimmy stated that his trip to London was really important to the conclusion of the album, because the project's destination was to have an "international nature", that's why Slimmy choose to sing in English. Slimmy explained:

"From the moment that we live in a city where there is so much information, so many concerts, people of many different nationalities and when we have the talent to write their own music, you end up absorbing it all and reflect it on your work. That's why half of the album was composed in London and the other half in Portugal... I tried to take advantage of this different culture and way of seeing things to express my feelings.

There is a track in the album titled "Good Night, Good Souls" that was originally recorded together with Rodolfo Cardoso for a demo album in 2002. Slimmy stated that he was the one that played and recorded most of the instruments for the album. Despite no being a producer, Slimmy was always involved in the production of the album since the songs were all composed by him. The relationship between Slimmy and the other producers was always good and Slimmy feels that that provided a good production for the album.

=== Concept ===
Slimmy said about the concept of the album: "I find it easy to make music in many ways, on guitar, piano, etc.. and this gives versatility to better define the direction of the songs. Then it is possible to make your own sound, no matter if you rock or electronic, what I wanted was to make it to sound like "a Slimmy one", that we could immediately identify it." He also said that this is the best records at the level of songs he had ever heard, made by a Portuguese person. He said he would like people to listen to it carefully, dance and have fun.

The album is essentially an electronic rock album. It has a lot of "rock attitude". Slimmy said that his "heroes" from the past and present are rock stars. It's an album of songs that don't matter what style of music they have, all that matters is that people stay with the song and get the emotions Slimmy was feeling when he was writing the songs. The album is "rock fused with electronic". When he was asked about the "final product" he said: "Honestly, I think it came out better. During these years there were many times when I hesitated whether I was going in the right direction if that was where I wanted to be, but then when I saw the final product and liked it, it had a minimal importance. Honestly, I like to listen to my music. The work exceeded my expectations."

== Release and promotion ==
Slimmy and Paulo Garim performing during the "Sex and Love Tour", on December 31, 2008.

The album was released in two formats: the physical edition, featuring 11 tracks; and the digital edition also featuring 11 tracks. "Bloodshot Star" was part of an episode of the American TV series CSI: Miami (Episode 23 of Season 4). "Self Control" served as the soundtrack of a generic program summaries sports on Sky Sports. "Beatsound Loverboy" was part of the soundtrack of the 5th season of the Portuguese soap opera Morangos com Açúcar (Slimmy played this song in the last episode) and "You Should Never Leave Me (Before I Die") was part of the soundtrack of the 6th season of the same soap opera. "Showgirl" and the song "Bloodshot Star" are part of the soundtrack of the Portuguese TV series "Rebelde Way". Four music videos were released from the album: "Beatsound Loverboy", "Show Girl", "Bloodshot Superstar" and "You Should Never Leave Me (Before I Die)".

To promote his album, Slimmy embarked on the "Sex and Love Tour". The "Sex and Love Tour" started on a Saturday night at the "Industry Nightclub". Slimmy presented his debut album, in front of an audience that "filled half the house". The show was considered as "safe and well". "Sex and Love Tour" shows opened with the theme that gives the album the title, "Beatsound Loverboy", thus enabling them to immediately grab the audience that did not stop until the end to encourage the trio. No breaks between songs were taken, Slimmy and the band also pulled by the public, because the songs lend themselves to lively concerts on both sides of the stage. In this environment of great empathy between musicians and audience, what was heard, than "Bloodshot Star," "Dumb" and "You Should Never Leave Me (Before I Die)" where Slimmy switched between play and sing. In these moments, and there were several during the concert, the musician took the opportunity to give vent to his staging that is so characteristic, lending even more interest to some moments of action. "On My Own", "Missile", "Set Me on Fire" and "Self Control" completed the first part of the concert. After a brief output stage, the band that proved to be very professional on stage, offered four themes stood out where the fabulous "Show Girl", undoubtedly one of the singles of the debut album. And, outside of the program, the band eventually returned for a second "encore", ending the concert with the song "Loverboy Beatsound".

=== Singles ===
"Beatsound Loverboy" was unveiled as the album's lead single. The song was written by Slimmy and produced by Quico Serrano and Mark Turner. It was released to MySpace on January 1, 2007 and was released as digital single on September 6, 2011. The song entered at number 46 on the Portugal Singles Top 50 where it stayed for four weeks and came to peak at number 42 where it stayed for more two weeks. "Show Girl", also written by Slimmy and produced by Quico Serrano and Mark Turner, was released to MySpace as the second single of the album on the same day "Beatsound Loverboy" was released and was released as a digital single on May 26, 2008. It premiered on the Antena 3 radio station on the same day. The song entered at number 44 on the Portugal Singles Top 50 where it stayed for one week and peaked at number 44 where it stayed for more one week. "You Should Never Leave Me (Before I Die)" was unveiled as the album's third and final single. The song was written by Slimmy and produced by Quico Serrano and Mark Turner. It was also released to MySpace on January 1, 2007 and released as a digital single on November 25, 2008. The song entered at number 50 on the Portugal Singles Top 50 where it stayed for one week and came to peak at number 48 where it stayed for more one week.

== Reception ==
Professional ratings
Review scores
Source	Rating
A Tompa	favorable
BLITZ	3/5 stars

Upon its release, the album received mixed reviews from critics. RR from BLITZ said about the album:

It's a fact: the collision electro-rock has little or no surprises reserved. Slimmy does not add new ingredients to the recipe. It is also true that "Beatsound Loverboy" would benefit if it were cut off half of its 13 tracks and this would result in a great EP. For out of confident and convincing – even if they never innovative – rock songs with juicy filling electro-pop and glam, "the Luso-British lost in raids pop/rock boxy joining the hunger to eat at home, simultaneously sounding badly finished and misleading in context. In this kind of "The Doctor and the Beast" musical, is expected to only bad part is not taking over another.

In the other hand, A Trompa said that the album "promises to explode the dancefloors".

Despite the commercial failure and the mixed reviews, "Beatsound Loverboy" was voted the 3rd best national album of the past 15 years, the choice made by Antena 3 listeners, who decided to mark the 15th anniversary choosing from a list of 100, 15 albums representative, between 1994 and 2009 by several generations of national music. His work was filled with the nominations for "Golden Globe Newcomer of the Year" category and for the "MTV Europe Music Awards" in the category of "Best Portuguese Act".

=== Accolades ===
Publication	Country	Accolade	Year	Rank
Antena 3	Portugal	Melhor Disco Nacional dos Últimos 15 Anos	2009	#3

=== MTV Europe Music Awards ===
Year	Nominee / work	Award	Result
2008	Slimmy	Best Portuguese Act	Nominated

=== Golden Globes ===
Year	Nominee / work	Award	Result
2008	Slimmy	Best New Act	Nominated

== Track listing ==
All lyrics are written by Paulo Fernandes; all music is composed by Paulo Fernandes.

No.	Title	Writer(s)	Length
1.	"Beatsound Loverboy"	Paulo Fernandes	3:02
2.	"You Should Never Leave Me (Before I Die)"	Paulo Fernandes	3:58
3.	"Show Girl"	Paulo Fernandes	3:14
4.	"Bloodshot Star"	Paulo Fernandes	3:38
5.	"Self Control"	Paulo Fernandes	3:11
6.	"Set Me on Fire"	Paulo Fernandes	3:07
7.	"Far From You"	Paulo Fernandes	3:55
8.	"On My Own"	Paulo Fernandes	3:06
9.	"Inside the One"	Paulo Fernandes	3:42
10.	"All You Gotta' Do Is Stay Alive"	Paulo Fernandes	3:10
11.	"Good Night, Good Souls"	Paulo Fernandes	4:50

== Personnel ==
Taken from the album's booklet.

Performance Credits

- Paulo Fernandes – main vocals, guitar
- Paulo Garim – bass
- Tó-Zé – drums

Technical credits

- Quico Serrano – producer
- Mark Turner – producer

== Release history ==
Region	Date	Label	Format	Edition(s)
Portugal	September 17, 2007	Som Livre	CD	Standard edition

== Charts ==
=== Album ===
Chart	Peak Position
Portuguese Albums Chart	--

=== Singles ===
Year	Title	Chart Positions
Year	Title	POR
2007	"Beatsound Loverboy"	42
2008	"Show Girl"	44
2008	"You Should Never Leave Me (Before I Die)"	48
