= Be Someone Else =

Studio album by Slimmy
- Released: June 14, 2010
- Recorded: 2006 – 2010: Estúdios da Aguda, Portugal; – Wrong Planet Studios, United Kingdom
- Length: 38:53 (standard edition); 73:16 (deluxe edition)
- Label: iPlay
- Producers: Quico Serrano, Mark J Turner

Slimmy chronology
Slimmy Unplugged (2008)	Be Someone Else (2010)

Singles from Be Someone Else
- 1. "Be Someone Else" Released: January 1, 2010; 2. "The Games You Play" Released: March 6, 2010 (iTunes only); 3. "I Can't Live Without You in This Town" Released: June 14, 2010 (promo only)

Be Someone Else is the second studio album by Portuguese singer-songwriter Slimmy. Saul Davies was first set to be the producer of the album, however, such collaboration wasn't possible and Slimmy started working on the album with his longtime producers Quico Serrano and Mark J Turner. Other musicians joined Slimmy for the recording of the album: Paulo Garim in the bass and Tó-Zé in the drums, who already worked with slimmy in Beatsound Loverboy, and Gustavo Silva, in the keyboards and Daniel Santos in the guitar as guest musicians. He mentioned that all production process happened because of him and that he was the one with the "last word" on his projects, not the bands or producers that he worked with. Originally due for release in May 2010, the album's release was pushed back to June 14, 2010. The album was released in three formats: the physical standard edition, the physical deluxe edition with 2 discs and the digital format featuring 10 tracks.

Slimmy defined the album as "freedom, with a bit of "teasing" and "sexual", an album full of strong songs dedicated to his fans. The album is essentially a rock album, a completely opposite of Beatsound Loverboy, which features a more electronic sound, keeping, however, the same connection between rock and electro music. In an interview with JN Slimmy declared that the album feels more organic and less electronic because in Beatsound Loverboy, there was no one else to play the songs but him. While maintaining his irreverence, Slimmy guarantees, however, that what matters is to make music that people intending to sing and lyrics that people can understand. He also said that he already received criticism for not being a singer with a proper style, but "I try to provide different sensations to people.

Slimmy's most significant promotion marked the beginning of "A Very Slimmy Tour", starting on February 18, 2011, at the Kastrus River Klub in Esposende and ending on April 30, 2011, at the Pitch Club in Porto. Slimmy's "Be Someone Else Tour" began on May 6, 2011, with its opening show at the Academy Week in Mirandela. Neither of the album's singles, "Be Someone Else" and "The Games You Play", were particularly successful, charting anywhere. Critical response to the album was generally favorable, with critics praising Quico Serrano and Mark Turner's Be Someone Else's polished production, calling the album more direct and humanized than Beatsound Loverboy. "Be Someone Else" was a commercial disappointment, the album didn't manage to chart on any official chart company to date. Two music videos were released from the album: "The Games You Play", produced by Ana Andrade, Carla Fardilha, Clara Araújo Teixeira and Helena Oliveira, premiered on November 17, 2009, on YouTube and "Be Someone Else", produced by Riot Films and premiered on June 27, 2010.

== Background and development ==
=== Production ===
Slimmy started working on the album with his longtime producers Quico Serrano and Mark Turner by the third quarter of 2009. Saul Davies was first set to be the producer of the album, however, Davies was on tour with the band James at the time, making such collaboration impossible. Other musicians joined Slimmy for the recording of the album: Paulo Garim in the bass and Tó-Zé in the drums, who already worked with slimmy in Beatsound Loverboy, and Gustavo Silva, in the keyboards and Daniel Santos in the guitar as guest musicians. Slimmy commented that most songs on the album are re-recordings which were recorded in Portugal in 2006 and 2007, however, these suffered some changes during the recording sessions at the Wrong Planet Studios in the UK, to improve their sound quality.

In an interview with Susana Faria of JPN, Slimmy defined the album as "freedom, with a bit of "teasing" and "sexual", an album full of strong songs dedicated to my fans". During this same interview, Slimmy talked about the album:

"It's funny that "Be Someone Else" reminds me 2001 when I was trying to battle alone against everything and everyone, I couldn't even get members to play with me in the band. Noticed that I just had to give more of me if I wanted to be somebody different. The "Be Someone Else" is intended to be that someone different, not if only because it is different, but because I have a dream. Regard as a message to people to worry less about others and more about themselves and go after what they really want."

=== Concept and music ===
"This album is about the experiences that I lived or the places where I've been through, but very timeless experiences."

— Slimmy during interview with Jornal Metro

The album is essentially a rock album, a completely opposite of Beatsound Loverboy, which features a more electronic sound, keeping, however, the same connection between rock and electro music. Slimmy has been influenced by rock artists such as Placebo, IAMX and Kings of Leon. Slimmy explained that Be Someone Else sounds different from Beatsound Loverboy because of its complex and structured production. Slimmy mentioned that Be Someone Else is less individualist than Beatsound Loverboy, he declares that this album is like "a message about being who you are", while his previous album talked about his past experiences, specially about his experience in London. In an interview with Palco Principal, Slimmy was asked if he missed the "One Man Show" times. He declared that "Doesn't matter how big the bands that play with me are, I will always feel like "one", because, in this new record, I was the one who spent nights working on the album, not my band". He also mentioned that all production process happened because of him and that he was the one with the "last word" on his projects, not the bands or producers that he worked with. During this same interview, Slimmy confessed that is always good to have someone with great ideas to work with, in this case, he was talking about him. He explained: "if there were five persons creating music, there would be a lot of mess, that's why do it all and I'm glad people trust in me for that". "I Can't Live Without You in This Town", an electro rock ballad, makes a markable difference from the other tracks, some critics called the chorus of the song memorable. The song is dedicated to a girl Slimmy met in Texas in 2004. The album also features a song entitled "Together 4ever" remixed by DJ Ride. The song "Beatsound Loverboy", included on the Beatsound Loverboy Remixes EP, was also remixed by DJ Ride.

In an interview with JN Slimmy declared that the album feels more organic and less electronic because in Beatsound Loverboy, there was no one else to play the songs but him. He explained that with the trio now completely formed, it is a whole different concept, everything sounds different, and their presence on stage is more energetic and trustful. Slimmy also declared that SLIMMY is no longer a solo project, but also belongs to those who follow it. In an interview with Jornal Metro, Slimmy said that the album reflects the maturity, greater stability in the mind. While maintaining his irreverence, Slimmy guarantees, however, that what matters is to "make music that people intending to sing and lyrics that people can understand. I do not do things to shock", he also said that he already received criticism for not being a singer with a proper style, but "I try to provide different sensations to people. When I sing alive, I sound much more rock, but in this album, there are many different spirit moods".

== Release and promotion ==
Originally due for release in May 2010, the album's release was pushed back to June 14, 2010. It was released in three formats: the physical standard edition, featuring 10 tracks; the physical deluxe edition with 2 discs, the first disc featuring the standard 10 track listing plus a bonus remix of "Together 4ever" and the second disc, released in digipack format together with the other CD, featuring remixes of 8 songs from Beatsound Loverboy; and the digital format featuring 10 tracks. Both standard and deluxe edition's jewel case CD contained a booklet with alternative covers.

In an interview with Palco Principal, on March 23, 2010, Slimmy revealed the title of the album. He explained: "As a first resort, when I wrote the lyrics of the song ["Be Someone Else"], I just wanted to warn those who not work, but still waiting for results. If you want to be somebody, you have to give much of yourself, is not enough to "give less and expect more". However, over the years, I realized that music was also for the kind of people that bring us down. Life is not a race. We must be ourselves, open our eyes and always look forward."

Slimmy performing during the "Be Someone Else Tour", on May 6, 2011.

While being interviewed by Palco Principal, Slimmy declared he was bit "unsure" about the promotion process of the album, he affirmed that he already had shows to make in France and Germany, but his real intention was to tour Portugal intensively, because he felt he had no success in his country. The first promotional concert took place at the Cidade do Porto Shopping on March 26, 2010, where Slimmy sang a few songs from his album, including "The Games You Play" and "Be Someone Else". Slimmy also promoted his album in Albufeira, at the Algarve Shopping's Fnac on November 27, 2010. Slimmy's next significant promotion marked the beginning of "A Very Slimmy Tour", where Slimmy performed songs from his two albums. It started on February 18, 2011, at the Kastrus River Klub in Esposende and ended on April 30, 2011, at the Pitch Club in Porto. The first music video to be released was "The Games You Play", produced by Ana Andrade, Carla Fardilha, Clara Araújo Teixeira and Helena Oliveira. It premiered on November 17, 2010, on YouTube. A music video was also made for "Be Someone Else", produced by Riot Films. It premiered on June 27, 2010, on YouTube. Slimmy's "Be Someone Else Tour" began on May 6, 2011, with its opening show at the Academy Week in Mirandela. Future show dates will be added on 1bigo's Facebook page. Slimmy also performed at the Queima das Fitas in Viana do Castelo on May 15, 2011.

=== Singles ===
"Be Someone Else" was unveiled as the album's lead single. The song was written by Fernandes and produced by Quico Serrano and Mark Turner. It was released to MySpace on January 1, 2010. "The Games You Play", also written by Fernandes and produced by Quico Serrano and Mark Turner, was released as the second single of the album on March 6, 2010, on the iTunes Store. "The Games You Play" premiered on the Antena 3 radio station on September 20, 2009 and was released on Slimmy's MySpace profile on September 30, 2009, as a promotional song. Neither of the album's singles were particularly successful, charting anywhere. Despite not being released as a single, "I Can't Live Without You in This Town" is available for digital purchase at Amazon since June 14, 2010. It charted at number 152 at the Metropolis Chart, and it was featured on the eighth season of the Portuguese soap opera Morangos com Açúcar.

== Critical reception ==
Professional ratings
Review scores
Source	Rating
A Trompa	Favorable
CDGO	Positive
Palco Principal	Favorable

Since its release, the album has received favorable reviews from contemporary music critics. A Trompa gave the album a favorable review, commenting that "[the album is] fast and oriented to be devoured in dance floors or other places of similar excitement and socializing" it "clearly evokes a modern rock that welcomes people to it". A Trompa also praised Quico Serrano and Mark Turner's polished production, calling the album more direct and humanized then Beatsound Loverboy. CDGO gave the album a positive review and commented that the album is more eclectic and that "it will surely satisfy the fans and other lovers of electronic music. Slimmy emphasizes again his unmistakable style, both musical and his image, proving to be one of the most promising musicians of the new generation of national music." Ágata Ricca from Palco Principal also gave the album a favorable review and stated that "[the album] marks the difference with the previous one, due to Slimmy's mature and reflective attitude" and that the album does not "change Slimmy's past, it just emphasize it and strengthen it". Ágata Ricca also praised the song "I Can't Live Without You in This Town" for its markable difference from the other tracks, calling the chorus of the song memorable. She also said that some other tracks of the album are pretty "danceable".

== Track listing ==
All lyrics are written by Paulo Fernandes; all music is composed by Paulo Fernandes, Paulo Garim, Tó-Zé, Gustavo Silva, Daniel Santos

Standard edition
No.	Title	Writer(s)	Length
1.	"Be Someone Else"	Paulo Fernandes	3:22
2.	"Glad I'm Lonely"	Paulo Fernandes	3:46
3.	"My Flipside"	Paulo Fernandes	3:15
4.	"Nightout"	Paulo Fernandes	3:19
5.	"The Games You Play"	Paulo Fernandes	3:29
6.	"You Give it a Shot"	Paulo Fernandes	3:20
7.	"I Can't Live Without You in This Town"	Paulo Fernandes	3:56
8.	"So Out Of Control"	Paulo Fernandes	3:22
9.	"Touch (Can Only Feel You)"	Paulo Fernandes	4:23
10.	"I'm Open Doors"	Paulo Fernandes	3:28

iTunes bonus track
No.	Title	Length
11.	"Together 4ever" (DJ Ride Mix)	2:57

=== Deluxe edition ===
Disc 1 (Be Someone Else)
No.	Title	Writer(s)	Length
1.	"Be Someone Else"	Paulo Fernandes	3:22
2.	"Glad I'm Lonely"	Paulo Fernandes	3:46
3.	"My Flipside"	Paulo Fernandes	3:15
4.	"Nightout"	Paulo Fernandes	3:19
5.	"The Games You Play"	Paulo Fernandes	3:29
6.	"You Give it a Shot"	Paulo Fernandes	3:20
7.	"I Can't Live Without You in This Town"	Paulo Fernandes	3:56
8.	"So Out Of Control"	Paulo Fernandes	3:22
9.	"Touch (Can Only Feel You)"	Paulo Fernandes	4:23
10.	"I'm Open Doors"	Paulo Fernandes	3:28
11.	"Together 4ever" (DJ Ride Mix)		2:57

Disc 2 (Beatsound Loverboy Remixes)
No.	Title	Writer(s)	Length
1.	"Inside The One" (Robot Português remix)	Paulo Fernandes	3:39
2.	"Bloodshot Star" (Players Please remix)	Paulo Fernandes	5:40
3.	"Beatsound Loverboy" (DJ Ride remix)	Paulo Fernandes	4:16
4.	"Set Me On Fire" (Beatbender remix)	Paulo Fernandes	3:49
5.	"Show Girl" (Bullycau remix)	Paulo Fernandes	4:35
6.	"You Should Never Leave Me Alone" (You Should Never Leave mash-up remix)	Paulo Fernandes	3:58
7.	"Inside The One" (Bitcrusher remix)	Paulo Fernandes	3:42
8.	"Bloodshot Star" (Dean Rosenweig remix)	Paulo Fernandes	4:44

== Personnel ==
Taken from iOnline.

Performance Credits

- Paulo Fernandes – main vocals, guitar
- Paulo Garim – bass
- Tó-Zé – drums

Technical credits

- Quico Serrano – Record producer
- Mark Turner – producer

== Charts ==
=== Songs ===
Year	Title	Chart Positions
Year	Title	POR
2010	"I Can't Live Without You in This Town"	152

== Release history ==
Region	Date	Label	Format	Edition(s)
Worldwide	June 14, 2010	iPlay	Digital Download	Standard edition
Portugal	June 21, 2010	iPlay	CD	Standard edition, Deluxe edition
France	June 21, 2010	iPlay	CD	Standard edition, Deluxe edition
Belgium	June 21, 2010	iPlay	CD	Standard edition, Deluxe edition
Spain	July 20, 2010	iPlay	CD	Standard edition, Deluxe edition
