= Beatsound Loverboy (song) =

Single by Slimmy

from the album Beatsound Loverboy
- Released: 6 September 2007
- Recorded: 2006
- Genre: Electronica, alternative
- Length: 3:03
- Label: Som Livre
- Songwriter(s): Paulo Fernandes
- Producer(s): Quico Serrano and Mark J Turner

Slimmy singles chronology
"Beatsound Loverboy" (2007)	"Show Girl" (2008)

"Beatsound Loverboy" is a song by Slimmy, released in 2007 as the lead single from his debut album Beatsound Loverboy. The song peaked at number 42 in the Portugal Singles Chart. The song also appeared on the soundtrack to Morangos com Açúcar soap opera.

== Background ==
"Beatsound Loverboy" was unveiled as the album's lead single. The song was written by Slimmy and produced by Quico Serrano and Mark Turner. It was released to MySpace on 1 January 2007, and was released as digital single on 6 September 2011. "Beatsound Loverboy" was part of the soundtrack of the 5th season of the Portuguese soap opera Morangos com Açúcar (Slimmy played this song in the last episode).

== Music video ==
Screenshot from "Beatsound Loverboy".

The video starts with a girl dancing to the song in a room, while Slimmy is watching her through a laptop. After this, the scene changes and shows several performances of Slimmy performing the song while wearing different outfits. Than, the scene changes again and shows Slimmy arriving to an abandoned factory and see two girls sleeping on a sofa. This scene is then alternated with the performance scene. After this, we see Slimmy returning to his laptop to observe the girl he was watching at the beginning of the video. The rest of the video shows the performance scene alternated with the factory scene. The video ends with a scene identical to the opening one.

== Chart performance ==
The song entered at number 46 on the Portugal Singles Top 50 where it stayed for four weeks and came to peak at number 42 where it stayed for more two weeks.

== Live performances ==
- Morangos com Açúcar – last episode
- Sex and Love Tour
- A Very Slimmy Tour
- Be Someone Else Tour

== Track listing ==
MySpace promotional single

1. "Beatsound Loverboy" (album version) – 3:03

Digital single

1. "Beatsound Loverboy" (album version) – 3:03

== Personnel ==
Taken from the album's booklet.

- Paulo Fernandes – main vocals, guitar
- Paulo Garim – bass
- Tó-Zé – drums

== Release history ==
Region	Date	Format
Worldwide	1 January 2007 (promo); 6 September 2007	Digital Download

== Charts ==
Year	Title	Chart Positions
Year	Title	POR
2007	"Beatsound Loverboy"	42
