= La dueña (Venezuelan TV series) =

- Genre: Telenovela; Romance; Drama
- Created by: José Ignacio Cabrujas; Julio César Marmol
- Written by: José Ignacio Cabrujas; Julio César Marmol; Reinaldo Rodriguez; Enrique Arenas
- Directed by: Tomás López
- Starring: Amanda Gutiérrez; Daniel Alvarado; María Cristina Lozada; Mariela Alcalá
- Opening theme: Amor más Grande by Nancy Toro
- Country of origin: Venezuela
- Original language: Spanish
- No. of episodes: 80

Production
- Executive producer: Nardy Fernández
- Producer: Ramon Mangles
- Production location: Caracas
- Running time: 30 minutes
- Production company: Venezolana de Televisión

Original release
- Network: Venezolana de Televisión
- Release: 1984 – 1985

Related
- Dueña y señora (2006); La Patrona (2013); Santa Bárbara (2015)

La Dueña is a Venezuelan telenovela written by José Ignacio Cabrujas in collaboration with Julio César Marmol, and produced by Venezolana de Televisión in 1984. The plot was inspired by the novel The Count of Monte Cristo written by Alexandre Dumas, though they changed the protagonist from male to female. La Dueña is considered one of the best telenovelas made in Venezuela.

Amanda Gutiérrez and Daniel Alvarado starred as the main protagonists with María Cristina Lozada as the antagonist.

== Plot ==
In 1928, Esteban Rigores lies wounded on a beach after taking part in a failed coup against the brutal regime of Gen. Juan Vicente Gómez. Fearing death is near, he orders Basilio, his mute servant, to search for Adriana, his daughter, and leave her his fortune. Neither Esteban nor Basilio know what Adriana looks like. When Basilio asks the girl's mother, Beatriz Ayala, now married to Salvador Asensio, one of Gomez's ministers, about the girl, she lies to him that her daughter died in childbirth, or at least that is what her parents told her. Unconvinced, Basilio goes to the house of Don Alejandro, Esteban's friend. There, she meets Adriana, and he immediately recognizes her as Esteban's daughter. But Adriana doesn't know her origins, believing she is an orphan adopted by Alejandro out of charity. Although Alejandro and Encarnación, his wife, have always been kind to Adriana, she is nothing but a glorified servant. Their children, the selfish María Consuelo looks down on her, idealistic Luis Alberto loves her secretly, and young María Eugenia who's always seen Adriana as a sister, now resents her when she realises her fiancé is attracted to the girl's beauty. Ma. Eugenia's fiancé, the arrogant Captain Mauricio Lofiego, is a man used to getting whatever he wants, a trait he has inherited from Purificacion Burgos, his mother. Purificacion is not only one of the richest women in Venezuela, but she's also got General Gomez's ear. Few people are know that Burgos's fortune comes from prostitution.

Adriana gives Alejandro the documents she's unable to read since they're written in French and English. Alejandro discovers that Adriana is now the owner of a huge fortune. That same evening, Mauricio breaks off his engagement with María Eugenia and has sex with Adriana. Alejandro sees him leaving the girl's room and vows revenge. Several attempts are made to separate Adriana and Mauricio, but their love grows stronger, especially after she discovers she is pregnant. Meanwhile, a recovered Esteban and Beatriz have joined efforts to investigate the whereabouts of their child. Adriana plans to escape with Mauricio, but she disappears mysteriously. Under the orders of Alejandro and Purificacion, she is taken to a mental asylum where she is subjected to horrible tortures, and she loses her baby and her mind. Believing Adriana lied to him, Mauricio married Maria Eugenia.

Several years go by, and Adriana has lost her beauty and mind, but she has two friends at the asylum, the kind Helena, and Saul, a political prisoner. When Gomez dies, Saul escapes the asylum together with Adriana and Helena. Adriana finds Basilio who directs her to her father Esteban who had escaped to Paris. Esteban will utilise his fortune to restore his daughter's beauty and educate her. In 1941, Adriana returns to Caracas, rich and powerful, newly transformed as Ximena, but she is called "La Dueña", and ready to take revenge against the families that locked her up.

== Cast ==
- Amanda Gutiérrez as Adriana Rigores Ayala / Ximena Sáenz
- Daniel Alvarado as Capt. Mauricio Lofriego
- Héctor Mayerston as Esteban Rigores
- Mariela Alcalá as María Eugenia Tellez
- María Cristina Lozada as Purificación Burgos de Lofiego
- Carlota Sosa as María Consuelo Tellez
- Lucio Bueno as Radamés Parisí
- Ana Castell as María Benita
- Helianta Cruz as Beatriz Ayala de Asensio
- Ramon Hinojosa as Cirilo
- Eduardo Gadea Perez as Manuel Antonio Lofiego
- Omar Omaña as Abelardo Lofiego
- Rafael Briceño as Gen. Juan Vicente Gómez
- Agustina Martin as Mercedes Antonini
- Freddy Salazar as Alejandro Tellez
- Fina Rojas as Elvira
- Flor Elena González as Eloiza Lofiego
- William Moreno as Ildemaro
- Raul Mendez as Pablo
- Carlos Acosta as Javier Perentena
- Leticia Calderón as Ana
- Mario Brito as Basilio
- Leopoldo Regnault as Saúl Galván
- Olga Henriquez as Encarnación

== Remakes ==
- 2006: Dueña y Señora (filmed in Puerto Rico and broadcast on Telemundo) starring Karla Monroig & Angel Viera
- 2013: La Patrona (filmed in Mexico and broadcast on Telemundo)
- 2015 Santa Bárbara (filmed in Portugal and broadcast on TVI)
