= Júlia Belard =

Portuguese actress (born 1988)

- Born: Júlia Corrêa Mendes Mantero Belard; 25 October 1988 (age 38); Lisbon, Portugal
- Education: University of Lisbon
- Spouse: Francisco Sérvulo Correia
- Children: 2

Júlia Corrêa Mendes Mantero Belard (born 25 October 1988 in Lisbon) is a Portuguese actress and influencer. She is known for appearing in telenovelas including playing Raquel Gameiro in Morangos com Açúcar.

== Biography ==
Belard was born on 25 October 1988 to a 16-year-old Portuguese mother and an 18-year-old Irish father, who went home to Ireland while Belard was still a baby and never returned. She lived with her mother at her grandparents' house and was primarily raised by her grandparents. Belard appeared in commercials and modeled as a child. She studied at the Faculty of Fine Arts at the University of Lisbon, and in 2018 was studying Tourism and Hotel Management at Escola de Hotelaria e Turismo do Estoril.

As an actress, she is best known for her roles in Portuguese telenovelas. Her first professional role was as Raquel on Morangos com Açúcar when she was 16. While primarily a television and film actress, she has also acted onstage, including in Ultima Noite at the Gil Vicente Theater in 2013 and in Don Giovanni, ou O Imorigerado Imortal at Lisbon's Thalia Theater. She acted opposite Liliana Santos and Morangos co-star Ângelo Rodrigues in Don Giovanni.

Belard and her partner, pilot Francisco Sérvulo Correia, have two sons: Matias (born 2017) and Sebastião (born 2023). The couple became engaged in 2017 during her first pregnancy but had to postpone the wedding due to the COVID-19 pandemic. Belard was diagnosed with polyendocrine metabolic ovarian syndrome (PMOS) prior to the birth of her children and was told she would never become pregnant.

== Selected filmography ==
- 2007: Morangos com Açúcar as Raquel Gameiro
- 2008: Deixa Que Te Leve as Graça Coelho
- 2008: Casos da Vida as Isabel
- 2010: Mar de Paixão as Dalila Ribeiro
- 2011: Anjo Meu as Carolina Oliveira / Camila
- 2012-2014: Doida Por Ti as Gabriela Matos
- 2014: Água de Mar
- 2014: BICHO
- 2014-2015: Mulheres as Carla Proença
- 2019: Amar Depois de Amar
- 2021: Irregular as Patrícia
