= Dueña y señora (TV series) =

Puerto Rican telenovela

- Created by: Julio Jiménez
- Written by: Balmore Moreno; Eugenia Calcaño; Enrique Arenas; Daniela Roman
- Directed by: Gregorio Scala; Carlos Porte
- Starring: Karla Monroig; Angel Viera; Flor Nuñez; Braulio Castillo; Raul Rosado; Pedro Juan Figueroa; Gladys Rodríguez
- Country of origin: United States
- Original language: Spanish
- No. of episodes: 129

Production
- Executive producer: Jorge Gherantdi
- Producers: Ramon Mangles; Pedro Juan Figueroa; Jorge Gherantdi
- Production location: San Juan, Puerto Rico
- Camera setup: Multi-camera
- Running time: 42-45 minutes

Original release
- Network: Telemundo
- Release: August 5, 2006 – 2006

Related
- La Tormenta; Dame Chocolate

Dueña y Señora is a Puerto Rican telenovela based on La Dueña (a Venezuelan telenovela which experienced great success in 1984-85). It is produced by Telemundo Puerto Rico and Puerto Rico Vibra Inc., which intends to market it to the mainland United States' Spanish-speaking residents as well.

== History making ==
Dueña y Señora (Owner and Mistress), made Puerto Rican television history when it was released in August 2006, because it became the first Puerto Rican produced telenovela (Latin soap opera) since 1992. The telenovela's production was announced to the public on Puerto Rican written media, such as El Vocero and El Nuevo Dia newspapers.

== Cast ==
Main Cast In Order of Appearance

Actor	Character	Known as
Karla Monroig	Adriana Robles	Protagonist. Daughter of Beatriz and Esteban, in love with Diego
Angel Viera	Diego Santarosa	Protagonist. Son of Ivana and Manuel, brother of Willy, in love with Adriana
Flor Nuñez	Ivana Santarosa	Wife of Manuel, mother of Diego and Willy
Braulio Castillo	Manuel Antonio Santarosa	Husband of Ivana, father of Diego and Willy
Raul Rosado	Alejandro Peña	Villain. Husband of Carmen, father of Carlota, Mariela and Carlos Albetro, accomplice of Ivana
Pedro Juan Figueroa	Esteban Robles	Father of Adriana
Gladys Rodríguez	Elvira	Nanny of Adriana
Gilda Haddock	Beatriz Ayala	Mother of Adriana
Daniela Droz	Carlota Peña	Daughter of Alejandro and Carmen, sister of Mariela and Carlos Alberto
Brenda Liz Lopez	Mariela Peña	Daughter of Alejandro and Carmen, sister of Carlota and Carlos Alberto
Jonathan Montenegro	Carlos Alberto Peña	Son of Alejandro and Carmen, brother of Carlota and Mariela
Jorge Alberti	Willy Santarosa	Son of Ivana and Manuel, brother of Diego
Pablo Espinosa	Pablo Santarosa	Brother of Ivanna
Joffre Perez		
Carlos Miranda		
Meche Mercado	Carmen Peña	Wife of Alejandro, mother of Carlota, Mariela and Carlos Alberto
Ramon Saldaña		
Luis Enrique Romero		
Edgardo Monserrat	Javier	
Provi Sein		
Charlie Masso		
Danny Torres		
Ubel Anglada		
Noris Jofre		
Pili Montilla		
Katiria Soto		
Ernesto Franco		
Kaly Cordova	Pescador Asesino	

== International distribution ==
Unconfirmed reports state that Dueña y Señora will be distributed internationally by a German Production Company.

== Remakes ==
- 1984: La dueña (filmed in Venezuela and broadcast on VTV Canal 8)
- 2013: La Patrona (filmed in Mexico and broadcast on Telemundo)
- 2015 Santa Bárbara (filmed in Portugal and broadcast on TVI)
- 2018: La Patrona (filmed in Mexico and broadcast on Las Estrellas)
