= Vera Kolodzig =

Portuguese actress

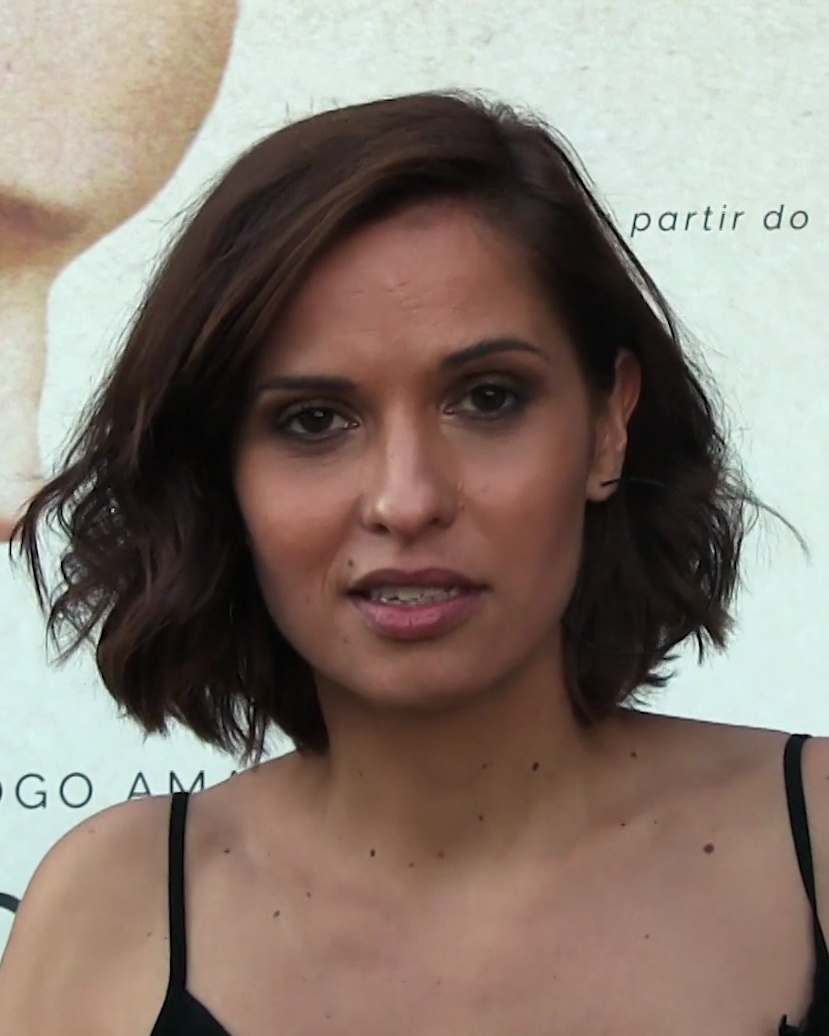
- Kolodzig in 2018
- Born: 22 April 1985 (age 41); Lisbon, Portugal
- Education: University of Essex
- Occupation: Actress
- Children: 1

Vera Kolodzig (born 22 April 1985 in Lisbon) is a Portuguese actress of German descent.

== Life and career ==
Kolodzig, whose father is German, lived in Cascais until she was 18 and then went to London to study contemporary theatre at the University of Essex. She started her career early, doing commercials at the age of 6. She performed in a number of theatre productions, most recently (2011/12) in Os 39 Degraus, an adaptation of Hitchcock's The 39 Steps. She is most known for starring in several Portuguese telenovelas.

== Television work ==
- 2000/2001: Jardins Proibidos (as Teresa Santos)
- 2001/2002: Filha do Mar (as Diana Nogueira)
- 2005/2006: Dei-te Quase Tudo (as Joana Capelo)
- 2007: Ilha dos Amores (as Beatriz Machado da Câmara)
- 2007/2008: Fascínios (as Renata Miranda)
- 2009/2010: Deixa Que Te Leve (as Filipa Calçada)
- 2010/2011: Espírito Indomável (as Maria José (Zé) Gomes/Constança Monteiro Castro)
- 2012/2013: Doida Por Ti (as Bianca Pessoa)
- 2014/2015: Jardins Proibidos (2014) (as Teresa Ávila)
- 2024/2025: Senhora do Mar (as Paula Soares)
