= Slimmy =

- Slimmy performing during the Be Someone Else Tour, 6 May 2011

Background information
- Born: Paulo Fernandes; Rio Tinto, Porto, Portugal
- Genres: Pop, rock, dance, electro, world, urban
- Occupation: Singer-songwriter
- Instruments: Vocals, electric guitar
- Years active: 1999–present
- Labels: Som Livre (2007–present) iPlay (2010–present)
- Website: www.slimmymusic.com

Slimmy, born Paulo Fernandes, is a Portuguese singer/songwriter who combines various genres of rock, especially electro rock. He has an irreverent visual look and an addictive musical style and has achieved mainstream success after an appearance on the Portuguese soap opera Morangos com Açúcar. His music has also appeared in one episode of CSI. His song, "Self Control," has been featured on Sky Sports.

== Life and career ==
=== 1999–2005: early life and career beginnings ===
In 1999 and 2000, Slimmy’s career took hold from the impact generated around a third prize at the Roland Masters Of The Groove 2000. From that point he began to develop a musical approach that combined rhythms and electronic instrumentation of dance within the rock genre. The first demos were recorded with producer Rodolfo Cardoso in 2003. The collection that had been developed during the previous years did not pass unnoticed by the national and international music scene, catching the attention of noticeables such as Quico Serrano, Alvaro Costa and Saul Davies of the British band James who would later work on Slimmy’s debut studio album in 2007. In 2004, after studio work and varied concerts, Slimmy relocated to London, performing in reputable venues such as the Dublin Castle, Hope and Anchor, Rhythm Factory, Bull and Gate, materialising in an opening slot on the tour of the American English Electric 6. In 2005, Slimmy began to reach the UK media with airplay on Virgin FM and XFM. Also around this time, "Bloodshot Star" started to play on MTV2 Channel, and was chosen for the TV series C.S.I. Miami (episode 23 4th grade), even though he was still considered without a recording deal. The song "Self Control" was also used as a soundtrack to the program summaries of the Premiership on Sky Sports.

=== 2006–present: career breakthrough, Beatsound Loverboy, Be Someone Else and Freestyle Heart ===
In 2007, Slimmy returned to Portugal, embarking on an extensive national tour in preparation for the release of his debut album Beatsound Loverboy, on the Som Livre label. The album features a fusion of rock and electro music, releasing three singles, “Beatsound Loverboy”, “Show Girl” and “You Should Never Leave Me”. The music video for “Show Girl” gained controversy for its revealing lesbian content. “Beatsound Loverboy” and “You Should Never Leave Me” appeared on the Morangos com Açúcar soundtrack and the album was voted the 3rd best national album of the past 15 years, chosen by the listeners of the national radio station Antena 3. The year 2008 began with a new tour, with Slimmy presenting the full album throughout the country. The album garnered much recognition within the media and earned Slimmy a nomination for “Golden Globe Newcomer of the Year” as well as a nomination in the “MTV Europe Music Awards” for “Best Portuguese Act”. Slimmy edited in digital format Slimmy Unplugged, his only live album to date, with 13 songs, recorded live at Salon Castelense in June of that year.

In late 2009 Slimmy's career was divided between live performances and studio work, where he began recording on the album Be Someone Else, eventually released in June 2010. Recorded between studios Aguda (Portugal) and the studios Wrong Planet (UK), Be Someone Else enlisted the production of Quico Serrano and Mark Turner. The album marked a change in lineup for the band with Slimmy on voice and guitar, Paulo Garim on bass and Tozé on drums, joined by guest musicians on Gustavo Silva programming and keyboards, and Daniel Santos on guitar. This album features 11 tracks in the same musical style of Beatsound Loverboy, but focused more on Electro music. The album also featured two singles, "The Games You Play" and "Be Someone Else". Promotional concerts ensued until the end of the year.

In 2012, Slimmy began work on Freestyle Heart, developing demos with Canadian producer Andrew Torrence. Recording commenced in Portugal in April of that year and marked a noticeable difference in his direction, leaning more toward his inert dance influences. Changes in the band's lineup also solidified a new direction for Slimmy, suggesting a more accessible approach from his earlier work. As a bonus track, "Anjo Como Tu" was included on the disc, his first and only recording done in his native language, Portuguese. As a result of the notoriety surrounding the song, it was chosen as a single and went on to become his biggest hit to date, going number one nationally. Presently, Slimmy is living in Portugal and performing in support of this latest release Freestyle Heart.

== Image ==
Slimmy has been influenced by rock artists such as Placebo, IAMX and Kings of Leon. His vocals have drawn frequent comparison to those of Brian Molko and Caleb Followill, while the structure of his music is said to echo classic 1980s rock and 2000s electro. Slimmy's personal image, exploited with television appearances and a constant stream of videos has been considered extravagant and overworked, using rock imagery and fancy outfits to make a noticeable impression within the genre. This has also contributed to the widespread doubt as to his sexual orientation.

== Awards ==
Slimmy was nominated for the Portuguese Golden Globe Awards and also for the European Music Awards (MTV) in Best Portuguese Act.

=== MTV Europe Music Awards ===
The MTV Europe Music Awards is an annual awards ceremony established in 1994 by MTV Europe.

Year	Nominee / work	Award	Result
2008	Slimmy	Best Portuguese Act	Nominated

=== Golden Globes ===
The Golden Globes is an annual awards ceremony by SIC.

Year	Nominee / work	Award	Result
2008	Slimmy	Best New Act	Nominated

== Discography ==
- 2007: Beatsound Loverboy
- 2008: Slimmy Unplugged
- 2010: Be Someone Else
- 2012: Freestyle Heart

=== Videoclips ===
So far he has released seven videoclips:

- "Beatsound Loverboy"
- "Bloodshot Star"
- "Showgirl"
- "You Should Never Leave Me (Before I die)"
- "The Games You Play"
- "Be Someone Else"
- "Anjo Como Tu"

=== Singles ===
Year	Title	Chart Positions	Album
Year	Title	POR	Album
2007	"Beatsound Loverboy"	42	Beatsound Loverboy
2008	"Show Girl"	44	Beatsound Loverboy
2008	"You Should Never Leave Me (Before I Die)"	48	Beatsound Loverboy
2010	"Be Someone Else"	–	Be Someone Else
2010	"The Games You Play"	–	Be Someone Else
2013	"Glitter"	–	Freestyle Heart
2013	"Anjo Como Tu"	–1	Freestyle Heart
