= Marta Andrino =

Portuguese actress

- Born: Marta Andrino; June 14, 1987 (age 39); Lisbon, Portugal
- Occupation: Actress
- Years active: 2006–present

Marta Andrino (born June 14, 1987) is a Portuguese actress. She has starred in several telenovelas.

== Biography ==
She was born in Lisbon, capital city of Portugal. Her mother, Carla Andrino, is also an actress. Andrino studied theater in Brazil while her mother was part of the cast of Rede Globo's telenovela Negócio da China. She has a degree in marketing.

== Career ==
Marta Andrino started her career in 2006, when she played Paula Costa in SIC's television series Aqui não Há Quem Viva. Andrino guest starred in 2008, as Tatiana in the second-season episode Vida Dupla, of TVI's miniseries Casos da Vida. Marta Andrino and her mother played daughter and mother in 2008's TVI's telenovela A Outra. She played a rebel teenager named Catarina in TVI's telenovela Deixa que Te Leve from 2009 to 2010. Marta Andrino from 2010 to 2011 again starred in a telenovela with her mother, in TVI's telenovela Espírito Indomável, when she played Elisabete Ramos, while her mother played Josefa Ramos. The actress played the young Júlia in 2011, TVI's miniseries Redenção, and in the same year, she joined the cast of Morangos com Açúcar as the lead antagonist Verónica Lima. After her role as Eduarda in Doida Por Ti, she plays the antagonist Iolanda in the 2013, telenovela I Love It.

== Filmography ==
=== Television ===
Year	Title	Role
2000	Bacalhau com Todos	As an extra (Credited)
2006	Aqui não Há Quem Viva	Paula Costa
2008	Casos da Vida	Tatiana
2008	A Outra	Sofia Franco
2009–2010	Deixa que Te Leve	Catarina Rodrigues
2010–2011	Espírito Indomável	Elisabete Ramos
2011	Redenção	Young Júlia
2011–2012	Morangos com Açúcar	Verónica Lima
2012–2013	Doida Por Ti	Eduarda
2013–2014	I Love It	Iolanda
