= Miguel Gaudêncio =

Portuguese film director and producer (born 1971)

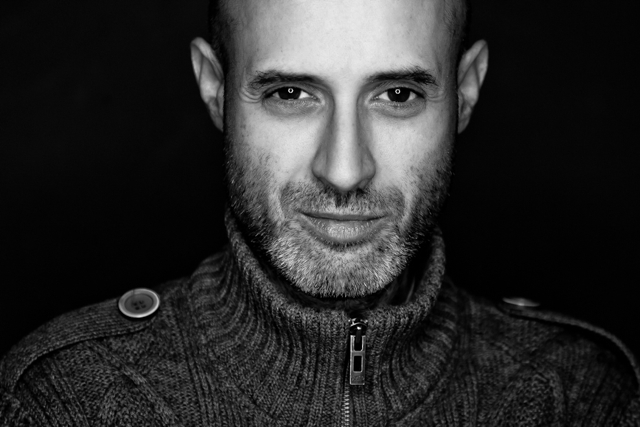
- Portrait of Miguel Gaudencio
- Born: October 28, 1971 (age 54); Mozambique
- Occupation(s): Director, producer, writer, editor

Miguel Gaudencio is a Portuguese film director and producer. He has been recruited by major international brands, such as McDonald's and Coca-Cola, to innovate their product commercials.

== Career ==
Miguel Gaudencio directed more than 200 music videos in Portugal before reaching the age of 30. His sharp, snappy directorial style earned him many awards: Try Again won the SOL TV Music Video award for the best music video of the year in 2000.

By 2001, advertising agencies were lining up to utilise Gaudencio's talent, and he began shooting commercials for leading multi-national clients such as McDonald's, Coca-Cola and Mercedes. By 2003 Gaudencio was working across Europe. He has now directed commercials for agencies in countries including Poland, Germany, Russia, Croatia, Slovenia, Czech Republic, Bulgaria, Romania, Morocco and Tunisia.

In 2004 he directed his first short feature, The Hole, a 30-minute film that was the standout work in a ten-part Christmas-story special aired on Portuguese television. He directed his second 30-minute feature, a taught psycho-sexual thriller, Same Room Same Time, in 2006.

In 2008, Gaudencio directed his first full-length feature film, Second Life. With an international all-star celebrity cast (Piotr Adamczyk, Liliana Santos, Claudia Vieira) the film had the biggest production budget in Portuguese cinema history, and an eight-week shoot on location in Portugal and Italy. The film received rave reviews and was the most commercially successful Portuguese film in the first six months of 2009.

In 2010, Gaudencio directed the first Polish feature documentary, "Desire for Beauty," which explored issues of beauty and self-perception through the journeys of individuals turning to plastic surgery. The documentary starred Agata Kulesza and gained worldwide release in 2014.

Down, But Not Out! and No Excuses both feature-length documentaries (shot simultaneously during the summer of 2014) are a personal approach to the world of feminine sport. Down, But Not Out! follows four amateur women boxers as they step into the ring for the first time and No Excuses captures imagery in a Crossfit atmosphere set to a diversified selection of commentators on gender equality.

In 2017, Gaudencio produced and directed "Tattoo Girls," a female-centric documentary showcasing the lives of ordinary women from different age groups and backgrounds, emphasizing their impact on society. This was followed by the sports documentary "Offside" (2019), which focused on a female Polish football team during their pre-season training, highlighting their commitment and camaraderie.

During 2020, Gaudencio completed two distinctive films: "All About Love," featuring ordinary people sharing stories about love and loss, and "Just Girls," following the journeys of three young Polish women from the LGBT community, defying intolerance while seeking inner happiness.

In 2023, Gaudencio released "Through Another Lens Vol. 1," an anthology of short films shot in breathtaking locations like Paris, Petra, Scotland, and Bali. He also unveiled "Marta & Jagna Vol. 1," an intimate portrait of the unbreakable bond between a mother and daughter in the world of gymnastics, part of a larger 10 year project.

== Filmography ==
=== Films (features) ===
Year	Title	Role
2009	Second Life	Director
2013	Desire for Beauty	Director, producer
2013	The Cape	Director, editor
2015	Down, But Not Out!	Director, producer, editor
2017	Tattoo Girls	Director, producer, editor
2019	Offside	Director, producer, editor
2020	Just Girls	Director, producer, editor
2020	All About Love	Director, producer
2023	Through Another Lens Vol. I	Director, producer, editor
2023	Marta & Jagna: Vol. I	Director, producer, editor
2025	My Memories with Ava	Director, producer, editor
