= Second Life (film) =

2009 Portuguese film

Second Life is a 2009 Portuguese movie directed by Miguel Gaudêncio and produced by Alexandre Valente. It stars Piotr Adamczyk, Lúcia Moniz, Pedro Lima, Paulo Pires and Sandra Cóias. It was the second highest-grossing Portuguese film in 2009.
