= You Should Never Leave Me (Before I Die) =

Single by Slimmy

from the album Beatsound Loverboy
- Released: November 25, 2008
- Recorded: 2006
- Genre: Electronica, alternative
- Length: 3:58
- Label: Som Livre
- Songwriter: Paulo Fernandes
- Producers: Quico Serrano and Mark J Turner

Slimmy singles chronology
"Show Girl" (2008)	"You Should Never Leave Me (Before I Die)" (2008)	"Be Someone Else" (2010)

"You Should Never Leave Me (Before I Die)" is a song by Slimmy, released in 2008 as the third and final single from his debut album Beatsound Loverboy. The song peaked at number 48 in the Portugal Singles Chart, making it Slimmy's lowest charted single to date. "You Should Never Leave Me (Before I Die") was part of the soundtrack of the 6th season of the same soap opera.

== Background ==
"You Should Never Leave Me (Before I Die)" was unveiled as the album's third and final single. The song was written by Slimmy and produced by Quico Serrano and Mark J Turner. It was also released to MySpace on January 1, 2007, and released as a digital single on November 25, 2008. "You Should Never Leave Me (Before I Die") was part of the soundtrack of the 6th season of the same soap opera.

== Music video ==
The video was filmed at the Casa da Música and at the Máus Hábitos bar in Porto, Portugal. The video was directed and produced by António Vieira and co-produced by Up Town Films, the cinematographer was Paulo Castilho, Miguel Januário was the art director. It features a special guest, Nicole Cerbeckx.

Screenshot from the video.

The video starts in Casa da Música with Slimmy and Nicole dressed like samurai and preparing themselves to fight each others. The scene changes and we can see Slimmy and his band performing the song at the Máus Hábitos bar, while the lyrics of the songs are projected into a wall. This scene finishes when the first chorus of the song ends. Than, we can see Slimmy and Nicole fighting again against each other. This scene is seen til the beginning of the second chorus. During the second chorus, the scene of the performance in the bar is shown. in the bridge of the song, we can see Slimmy and Nicole in a room with orange lights, where Slimmy is defeated. During the rest of the bridge, Slimmy and Nicole are kissing each other with a white background, while the lyrics of the song are projected into it. In the last chorus of the song, we see the performance at the bar again. The video finishes with Nicole delivering a rose to Slimmy, who's already dead. She then looks behind her and she sees Slimmy with a cat in his arms and she goes to meet him.

== Chart performance ==
The song entered at number 50 on the Portugal Singles Top 50 where it stayed for one week and peaked at number 48 where it stayed for more one week. It is Slimmy's lowest charted single to date

== Live performances ==
- Sex and Love Tour
- A Very Slimmy Tour
- Be Someone Else Tour

== Track listing ==
MySpace promotional single

1. "You Should Never Leave Me (Before I Die)" (album version) – 3:58

Digital single

1. "You Should Never Leave Me (Before I Die)" (album version) – 3:58

== Personnel ==
Taken from the album's booklet.

- Paulo Fernandes – main vocals, guitar
- Paulo Garim – bass
- Tó-Zé – drums

== Release history ==
Region	Date	Format
Worldwide	January 1, 2007 (promo); September 17, 2007	Digital Download

== Charts ==
Year	Title	Chart Positions
Year	Title	POR
2008	"You Should Never Leave Me (Before I Die)"	48
