= Patricio Sebastián =

Mexican actor (born 2003)

- Born: Patricio Sebastián Fernández; March 3, 2003 (age 22); Distrito Federal, Mexico City, Mexico
- Occupation: Actor
- Years active: 2011-present

Patricio Sebastián (born March 3, 2003), is a Mexican television actor.

== Career ==
He began his career at the age of 8 years, in the soap opera El Octavo mandamiento. In 2012 he participated in the telenovela, titled Corona de lágrimas, In that year he began recording the telenovela La Patrona, where it is enshrined as the "Hijo de La Patrona". In 2014 he participated in several soap opera as Dos lunas, Camelia la Texana, El Señor de los Cielos where he played the character of Ernesto Gamboa as a child. In that same year, he joined the cast of the telenovela Señora Acero, where plays the son of the protagonist.

== Filmography ==
Television roles
Year	Title	Roles	Notes
2011–2012	El octavo mandamiento	Andrés San Millán	
2012	Corona de lágrimas	Child Patricio Chavero	Episode: "Familia sin hogar"
2013	La Patrona	Child David Suárez / Child Fernando Beltrán	Recurring role; 39 episodes
2013–2014	Kipatla	Rogelio	Main role; 5 episodes
2014	Dos Lunas	Lorenzo	Episode: "El grito"
2014	Camelia la Texana	Julián	1 episode
2014–2018	El Señor de los Cielos	Child Ernesto Gamboa	Recurring role (season 2); 5 episodes
2014 señora acero	Child Salvador Acero	Recurring role (seasonS 1–5); 30 episodes	
2014	Sr. Ávila	Hijo de Víctima Iván	Episode: "The Master and the Watchmaker"
2016	El Vato	Child El Vato	Recurring role (season 1); 7 episodes
