= Pedro Juan Figueroa =

Puerto Rican actor (1951–2017)

- Born: March 8, 1951; Santurce, Puerto Rico
- Died: July 7, 2017 (aged 66); Bayamón, Puerto Rico
- Occupations: actor and producer

Pedro Juan Figueroa (March 8, 1951 – July 7, 2017) was a well-known Puerto Rican actor of film and telenovela.

== Early years ==
He studied his regular academic degrees between the municipalities of San Juan, Guaynabo and Bayamón. It was precisely at this school stage that he peered into the world of acting. He earned a B.A. in humanities with specialization in theater in 1973 at the University of Puerto Rico.

== Selected filmography ==
- La Gran Alondra (2011)
- ...And God Created Them (1979)
- Tres destinos (1994)
- Señora tentación (1994)
- Dueña y señora (2006)

== Politics ==
In 2008 he also entered politics as a candidate for the Popular Democratic Party running for senator of the Senatorial District of San Juan but didn't win the election.

== Death ==
Figueroa died on July 7, 2017, at HIMA San Pablo Hospital in Bayamón, Puerto Rico after a battle with pancreatic cancer.
