= Don Amor =

Chilean television soap opera

- Title card
- Genre: Comedy drama Mystery; Thriller
- Created by: Jose Ignacio Valenzuela
- Directed by: Guillermo Melo; Enrique Bravo; Roberto Rebolledo
- Creative directors: Alfredo Barrios; Aurora Cedeño; Sara Refkol
- Starring: Ignacia Baeza; Jorge Alberti; Carolina Arregui; Jorge Martínez; Nydia Caro
- Opening theme: "Sol, playa y arena" by Tito El Bambino and Jadiel
- Countries of origin: Chile and Puerto Rico
- Original language: Spanish
- No. of episodes: 126

Production
- Executive producer: Javier Goldschmied
- Producer: Veronica Saquel
- Production locations: San Juan; Santiago
- Camera setup: Single camera
- Running time: 40-45 minutes
- Production company: Corporación de televisión de la Pontificia Universidad Católica de Chile

Original release
- Network: Canal 13; WIPR Puerto Rico TV
- Release: March 3 – September 1, 2008

Related
- Lola; Cuenta conmigo

Don Amor (lit: Mister Love) is a Chilean television soap opera created by José Ignacio Valenzuela, that aired on Canal 13 from March 3, to September 1, 2008. It is directed by Aurora Cedeño and Sara Refkol, starring Ignacia Baeza, Jorge Alberti, Carolina Arregui, Jorge Martínez and Nydia Caro.

== Cast ==
=== Main characters ===
- Ignacia Baeza as Chantal Acevedo.
- Jorge Alberti as Lucián Carvajal.
- Carolina Arregui as Maira Acevedo.
- Jorge Martinez as Angel Carvajal.
- Nydia Caro as Victoria Lausell.

=== Supporting characters ===
- Ernesto Javier as Jason Hernández (alias Jay).
- Awilda Sterling as Virginia Cosme (alias Doña Canga)
- Carlos Marín as Roberto "Tito" Torres (alias Tito).
- Dolores Pedro as Lorna Torres.
- Gabriela Hernández as Cecilia Ovalle.
- Eduardo Barril as Rodolfo.
- Sofía García as Constanza Dreyer.
- Carmina Riego as Beatriz Salas (alias Miss Betty).
- Israel Lugo as Cacho Ortega Jr. (alias Orteguita).
- Catalina Martin as María José Araya.
- Francisco Gormaz as Román Carnevalli.
- Catalina González as Vanesa Rodríguez.
- Cristobal Tapia-Montt as Rodrigo Cifuentes.
- Alfredo Allende as Eugenio Martínez (alias Topo).
- Oscar Guerrero as Pablo Manuel Velásquez.
- Nicolás Alonso as Cristian Flores.
- Carola García as Milagros Santos.
- Joaquín Jarque as Edwin Santana.
- Norwill Fragoso as Shelly Mar Gómez.
- Natalia Rivera as Paola Sierra.
- Jonathan Dwayne as José Carlos López.

=== Guest appearances ===
- Pili Montilla as Isabel.
- María Izquierdo as Patricia.
- Tamara Acosta as Gloria.
- Cristián Campos as Matías.
- Carlos Alberto López.
- Joann Polanco.
- Eddie Torreins.
- Eddie Irizarry.
- Victor Class.
- Marivette Gonzalez.

== Reception ==
=== Television ratings ===
Ibope Media Ratings (Chile)
Original broadcast date		Day rank	Viewership
Series premiere	March 3, 2008	1st	20,2%
Series finale	September 1, 2008	1st	20,6%
Average			16,8%
