= Show Girl (Slimmy song) =

"Show girl"

Single by Slimmy

from the album Beatsound Loverboy
- Released: May 26, 2008
- Recorded: 2006
- Genre: Electronica, alternative
- Length: 3:14
- Label: Som Livre
- Songwriter(s): Paulo Fernandes
- Producer(s): Quico Serrano and Mark J Turner

Slimmy singles chronology
"Beatsound Loverboy" (2007)	"Show girl" (2008)	"You Should Never Leave Me (Before I Die)" (2008)

"Show Girl" is a song by Slimmy, released in 2008 as the second single from his debut album Beatsound Loverboy. The song peaked at number 44 in the Portugal Singles Chart. "Showgirl" is part of the soundtrack of the Portuguese TV series "Rebelde Way".

== Background ==
"Show Girl", also written by Slimmy and produced by Quico Serrano and Mark Turner, was released to MySpace as the second single of the album on the same day "Beatsound Loverboy" was released and was released as a digital single on May 26, 2008. It premiered on the Antena 3 radio station on the same day. "Showgirl" together with the song "Bloodshot Star" is part of the soundtrack of the Portuguese TV series "Rebelde Way".

== Music video ==
Screenshot from "Show Girl"

The video starts with six girls "coming out" from a curtain like they were entering on stage. Then, we can see Slimmy in a black background walking towards us while singing to the song. Next to him, there are two girls kissing each other. The video is followed by a scene where we can see Slimmy performing in a nightclub while the girls featured in the opening scene of the video are dancing to the song. This scene is alternated with a scene where Slimmy is singing the song in a white background with CDs stuck in the wall. Apart from girls, we can also see transvestites in the video. The rest of the video features scenes from the performance in the nightclub.

== Chart performance ==
The song entered at number 44 on the Portugal Singles Top 50 where it stayed for one week and peaked at number 44 where it stayed for more one week.

== Live performances ==
- Sex and Love Tour
- A Very Slimmy Tour
- Be Someone Else Tour

== Track listing ==
MySpace promotional single

1. "Show Girl" (album version) – 3:14

Digital single

1. "Show Girl" (album version) – 3:14

== Personnel ==
Taken from the album's booklet.

- Paulo Fernandes – main vocals, guitar
- Paulo Garim – bass
- Tó-Zé – drums

== Release history ==
Region	Date	Format
Worldwide	January 1, 2007 (promo); May 26, 2008	Digital Download

== Charts ==
Year	Title	Chart Positions
Year	Title	POR
2008	"Show Girl"	44
