= La mesa caliente =

American television talk show

- Also known as: The Hot Table
- Genre: Talk show
- Presented by: Andrea Meza; Veronica Bastos; Karla Monroig; Lindsay Casinelli
- Country of origin: United States
- Original language: Spanish

Original release
- Network: Telemundo
- Release: March 7, 2022 – present

Related
- The View

La mesa caliente (English: The Hot Table) is an American television talk show that premiered on Telemundo on March 7, 2022. The current lineup of hosts consists of Andrea Meza, Veronica Bastos, Karla Monroig, and Lindsay Casinelli.

== Format ==
On the show, a panel of women discuss and debate current events, news and entertainment, and interview celebrities, newsmakers and experts.

== Hosts ==
- Andrea Meza (2025–present)
- Veronica Bastos (2022–present)
- Karla Monroig (2026–present)
- Lindsay Casinelli (2026–present)

=== Former hosts ===
- Myrka Dellanos (2022–2025)
- Giselle Blondet (2022–2026)
- Alix Aspe (2022–2023)

== Production ==
The first episode aired on March 7, 2022.

In February 2026, hosts Andrea Meza and Veronica Bastos announced during the morning show Hoy Día that the new season of La mesa caliente would premiere on March 2, 2026, with a new set, new logo and production moved to New York with Itati Cantoral and Alicia Machado being the first celebrities to be invited to the show. During the new season of the talk show, Karla Monroig and Lindsay Casinelli joined Andrea Meza and Veronica Bastos as new hosts of the show.
