= Pedro Lima (actor) =

Portuguese-Angolan actor and swimmer (1971–2020)

Personal information
- Born: 20 April 1971 Luanda, Portuguese Angola, Portugal
- Died: 20 June 2020 (aged 49) Cascais e Estoril, Cascais, Portugal
- Occupation: Actor
- Children: 5

Sport
- Sport: Swimming
- Partner(s): Patrícia Piloto; Anna Westerlund
Medal record
Men's swimming
Representing Angola
All-Africa Games
Gold medal – first place	1991 Cairo	50 m freestyle
Bronze medal – third place	1991 Cairo	100 m butterfly

Pedro Manuel Barata de Macedo Lima (20 April 1971 – 20 June 2020) was a Portuguese-Angolan actor, appearing in telenovelas in Portugal. He was also an Olympic swimmer.

== Swimming ==
He represented Angola in 1988 and 1992 at the Summer Olympics.

Lima participated in several swimming contests but never advanced past preliminaries. In 1988, he was disqualified from the Men's 50 m freestyle, finished 62nd in the Men's 100 m freestyle, 42nd in the Men's 100 m butterfly. In 1992, Lima finished 43rd in the Men's 50 m freestyle and 53rd in the Men's 100 m butterfly. Lima also won a gold and bronze medal at the 1991 All-Africa Games, he won the gold medal in the Men's 50 m freestyle and a bronze in the Men's 100 m butterfly

As of 2018, Lima held two national records for Angola the 50 m freestyle record set at the 1991 All-Africa Games of 23.98 seconds and the 100 m backstroke record of 59.30 seconds.

== Acting ==
After being invited to host a TV show about cinema called Magacine, he had roles in Portuguese soap operas like O Último Beijo, Ninguém como Tu, Fala-me de Amor, Ilha dos Amores and A Outra. He also starred in the 2009 movie Second Life.

== Personal life ==
Lima was partner of model Anna Westerlund, with whom he had four children. He also had an adult son from a previous relationship with Patrícia Piloto.

== Death ==
On 20 June 2020, Lima's body was found at Abano Beach in Cascais, in what appeared to have been a suicide. He reportedly sent out farewell messages to two acquaintances earlier on this day.

== Filmography ==
Year	Title	Role	Notes
2000	Trânsito Local	João	
2006	The Botanist		
2009	El Contrato	Peter Oliveira / Shade	
2009	Second Life	Luca	
2009	Perpétua		
2013	Quarta Divisão	Dono Agência	
2014	Eclipse em Portugal	Pastor	
2015	A Uma Hora Incerta	Jasmim	
2019	O Homem Cordial	Vitor	
2019	Congo: No Caminho das Trevas	Afonso Ferreira	Short film
