= Alexandre Valente =

Alexandre Cebrian Valente
- Occupations: film producer, film director
- Notable work: Second Life

Alexandre Cebrian Valente is a film producer and director from Portugal. His film Second Life was the second highest-grossing Portuguese film in 2009.
