= Slimmy Unplugged =

Live album by Slimmy
- Released: November 2008 (Optimus Store)
- Recorded: 19–20 June 2008 (Tertúlia Castelense, Maia, Portugal)
- Genre: Acoustic
- Label: Optimus
- Producer: Slimmy

Slimmy chronology
Beatsound Loverboy (2007)	Slimmy Unplugged (2008)	Be Someone Else (2010)

Slimmy Unplugged is the debut live album by Portuguese singer-songwriter Slimmy. It was recorded on 19 and 20 June 2008 at Tertúlia Castelense. It was released and available through Optimus in a limited digital edition during the months of November and December 2008 at the Optimus Store, for a price of €2.

== Background ==
By the end of 2008, Optimus presented a new format of concerts, starting in December, at the Optimus Store house of music that opened in Porto at the time. These special performances for 100 guests only, had floor space designed especially for events related to music. Deliberately restricted, these concerts had the objective to ensure a more intimate and familiar, especially in thinking most devoted fans of each guest artist.

For each of these concerts, Optimus offered 50 double tickets, which would be allocated through the site musica.optimus.pt and to the customers who subscribed to certain services or features.

Slimmy performed on two days: on 19 and 20 June 2008. The album was released and available through Optimus in a limited digital edition during the months of November and December 2008 at the Optimus Store, for a price of €2.

== Performances ==
Although information about the track listing of the concert is available anywhere, there are some sources that says that the album featured 13 tracks and that the following songs were part of the set list for the show:

- "Show Girl"
- "Bloodshot Star"
- "Night Out" (later included on Be Someone Else)
- "Coming and Going Around"
- "Game Over"
- "People in Cars"
- "True Love"
- "Dumb"

== Personnel ==
Taken from Slimmy's blog.

Performance Credits

- Paulo Fernandes – main vocals, guitar
- Paulo Garim – bass
- Tó-Zé – drums

== Release history ==
Region	Date	Label	Format
Optimus Store	November 2008	Optimus	Digital Download
