= Morangos com Açúcar Virus =

2006 mass psychogenic illness

In May 2006, several Portuguese teenagers developed symptoms similar to a fictitious disease portrayed in the Portuguese teen soap opera Morangos com Açúcar. The event, which has been called Morangos com Açúcar Virus or Soap Opera Virus, has been deemed an episode of mass psychogenic illness.

== History ==
The Morangos com Açúcar virus emerged after an episode aired of the Portuguese teen soap opera Morangos com Açúcar in which a terrible disease spreads at the characters' high school. Within days of the episode's premiere, Portuguese teenagers reported symptoms similar to those depicted on the show, including rashes, breathing difficulty, and severe dizziness. Cases spread to more than 300 high school students in 14 different schools in Portugal, some of which temporarily closed due to the severity of the outbreak.

The Portuguese National Institute for Medical Emergency later deemed it an episode of mass psychogenic illness, with director Nelson Pereira stating, "What we concretely have is a few children with allergies and apparently a phenomenon of many other children imitating." Another doctor, Mario Almeidi, pronounced his disbelief in the disease, saying "I know of no disease which is so selective that it only attacks school children." The craze coincidentally began shortly before End Of Course Tests. The explanation was ignored because of the sheer enormity of the situation.

== See also ==
- Tanganyika laughter epidemic
- 1983 West Bank fainting epidemic
- Dancing plague of 1518
- Salem witch trials
- Spring Heeled Jack
