= Be Someone Else (song) =

Single by Slimmy

from the album Be Someone Else
- Released: January 1, 2010
- Recorded: 2009
- Genre: Electronica, electronic rock, alternative rock
- Length: 3:22
- Label: iPlay
- Songwriter(s): Paulo Fernandes
- Producer(s): Quico Serrano and Mark J Turner

Slimmy singles chronology
"You Should Never Leave Me (Before I Die)" (2008)	"Be Someone Else" (2010)	"The Games You Play" (2010)

"Be Someone Else" is a song by Slimmy, released in 2010 as the lead single from his second studio album Be Someone Else. The single wasn't particularly successful, charting anywhere. A music video was also made for "Be Someone Else", produced by Riot Films. It premiered on June 27, 2010, on YouTube.

== Background ==
"Be Someone Else" was unveiled as the album's lead single. The song was written by Fernandes and produced by Quico Serrano and Mark J Turner. It was released to MySpace on January 1, 2010.

== Music video ==
A music video was also made for "Be Someone Else", produced by Riot Films. It premiered on June 27, 2010, on YouTube. The music video features two different scenes which alternate with each other many times during the video. The first scene features Slimmy performing the song with an electric guitar and the second scene features Slimmy performing with the band in the background.

== Chart performance ==
The single wasn't particularly successful, charting anywhere.

== Live performances ==
- A Very Slimmy Tour
- Be Someone Else Tour

== Track listing ==
Digital single

1. "Be Someone Else" (album version) – 3:22

== Personnel ==
Taken from the album's booklet.

- Paulo Fernandes – main vocals, guitar
- Paulo Garim – bass
- Tó-Zé – drums

== Release history ==
Region	Date	Format
Worldwide	January 1, 2010	Digital Download

== Charts ==
Year	Title	Chart Positions
Year	Title	POR
2010	"Be Someone Else"	--
