= Pili Montilla =

Puerto Rican TV Host

- Born: October 25, 1978 (age 48); Puerto Rico
- Occupations: TV host, actress and producer.

Pili Montilla is a Puerto Rican TV host and producer.

== Career ==
She works as a TV host for several networks in both the Hispanic and general audience, as a live host for different events and brands, and has worked for Walmart, Lexus and Starbucks.

She created, produced and hosted the Emmy-award-winning show "Té Para Tres con Pili Montilla" on Mega TV, where she spends a day in the life of Latin musicians. The show has been nominated for a number of Emmy awards and in 2015 won in the Magazine Show category.

In her native Puerto Rico, Montilla was an MTV video journalist for over three years, interviewing stars including Gwen Stefani, Shakira and Ricky Martin. She then joined the national, bilingual network LATV in Los Angeles, hosting shows including "En Concierto" and "En la Zona".

After LATV, Montilla became the entertainment reporter for the Univision show Primer Impacto.

She was also the entertainment reporter and producer for various outlets, including the award-winning national shows American Latino and LatiNation. Other hosting credits include MTV, LATV, MundoFox and E! Latino. She was featured in the 2013 comedy 200 Cartas alongside Lin-Manuel Miranda, Jamie Camil and Dayanara Torres.

In 2014 she appeared in the horror film Unknowns (Desconocidos) with Gabriel Porras, Sonya Smith and Francisco Gattorno, and has also featured in the television series Decisiones, Don Amor and Dueña Y Señora.

In 2017 and 2018 Montilla hosted the Latin Grammy's event for AT&T and has hosted BMI's Los Producers charity event during the Latin Grammy's for three years in a row. In 2019 she co-hosted the 2019 Billboard Latin Music Awards Red Carpet Pre-Show with Carlos Adyan. She's been the red carpet host for New York Magazine's Vulture Festival, in both New York and Los Angeles, for Direct TV for the past two years.

She has been invited to speak at conferences including SXSW, NALIP, Voto Latino, LAMC and Hispanicize where she also hosted the TECLA Awards.

Montilla's latest project is "Pili, Raúl & La Música" an uncensored, bilingual Latin music podcast she created, hosts and produces alongside DJ Raúl Campos. She has also acted as a social media influencer for the American Heart Association.
