= Lindsay Casinelli =

Venezuelan journalist

- Born: Lindsay Elena Casinelli; September 3, 1985 (age 41); Caracas, Venezuela
- Occupations: Journalist and Anchor
- Spouse: Miguel Ángel García (m. 2018)
- Children: 2

Lindsay Elena Casinelli (born September 3, 1985) is a Venezuelan-American sports journalist and television personality for Telemundo. Casinelli previously worked for Univision from 2012 to 2024.

== Early years ==
Casinelli was born in Caracas, Venezuela, in 1985, to an Italian Venezuelan family. She graduated high school in Venezuela at age 16. Casinelli moved to the United States to attend California State University, Long Beach, where she graduated with her bachelor's degree in broadcast journalism in 2006.

== Career ==
Casinelli began her career as the host of MLB's Los Angeles Angels weekly television show Angels in Action. In 2008, Casinelli was the host for the NBA's Los Angeles Lakers weekly magazine show " El Show de Los Lakers" in which she became the first female sports anchor for the local Univision channel KMEX. In 2009, she became a reporter for WXTV, the Univision station in New York City. She later became a sports reporter for Telefutura and ESPN Deportes.

Casinelli also is an Emmy award winner for her journalism. She has worked on Univision as a sportscaster calling the action on Combate Global and as co-host on Contacto Deportivo with Adriana Monsalve and others.

In 2024 she was let go by Univision after 12 years. After TelevisaUnivision decided that, at this stage of the company, all sports would be broadcast based in Mexico and not in the United States

In 2025, Casinelli completed an executive MBA at the Miami Herbert Business School.

In August 2025, Casinelli appeared on the Telemundo program La mesa caliente as a guest host. She has said this on her debut for the network: "Excited about this new beginning in my career.” In March 2026, she became a permanent host of the talk show.

== Personal life ==
Casinelli became a naturalized U.S. citizen in 2018. Also that year, she married Miguel Ángel García. They have two children and live in Miami.
