= Sandra Cóias =

Portuguese actress

Sandra Cóias is a Portuguese actress, known for Tu e Eu (2006), Terra Mãe (1998) and A Grande Aposta (1997). She began her career in 1997. Her ability to work in 5 languages gives her a rare skill. Alongside her professional career, as an environmental and animal activist, she has been developing various initiatives to promote a culture for sustainable development based on an ethic of respect and consideration for the values associated with the preservation, conservation and rehabilitation of the natural world and biodiversity. She collaborates actively with various institutions and NGOs, giving her voice and image to causes and important issues in these areas, such as WWF – Earth Hour, Earth for All Organizations as a goodwill ambassador in 2012, and earth water ambassador. Cóias is a vegan.
