= Patrícia Candoso =

Portuguese singer and actress

- Born: September 3, 1981 (age 44); Lisbon, Portugal

Patrícia Candoso (born September 3, 1981, in Lisbon) is a Portuguese singer and actress.

Candoso started singing while playing the role of "Sara" in Morangos Com Açúcar (Strawberries With Sugar), a Portuguese soap opera. She presented her first album, O Outro Lado (The Other Side) in 2004. She presented her second album, Só Um Olhar (Just One Look) in 2006.

She was married to a Portuguese actor João Catarré, and they met while filming the first season of Morangos Com Açúcar.
