= Francisco Adam =

Portuguese actor and model

- Born: Francisco Amaro Rodrigues Adam; 13 August 1983; Lisbon, Portugal
- Died: 16 April 2006 (aged 22); Benavente, Portugal
- Occupations: Actor, model
- Years active: 2003–2006

Francisco Amaro Rodrigues Adam (13 August 1983 – 16 April 2006) was a Portuguese actor and model, best known for his humorous role as Dino, short for Bernardino Esteves, in the Portuguese youth telenovela Morangos com Açúcar.

== Biography ==
Adam grew up in the village of Runa, near Torres Vedras. At the age of 18, he moved to Lisbon to become a model, first for Elite Models and later for On Fashion. After 4 years of working for fashion and advertisement campaigns, Adam was cast in Morangos com Açúcar. He had a considerable following on the Internet, mostly from Portuguese teenage girls, who nicknamed him the Dino-man.

== Death ==
Adam died in a car accident near Alcochete, at 03:50 UTC on 16 April 2006 (Easter Sunday), at the age of 22, after an autograph signing session at a nightclub in Coruche.

According to TVI, Adam was supposed to become the central character in Morangos com Açúcar in the following season.
