= Liliana Santos =

Portuguese actress and model (born 1980)

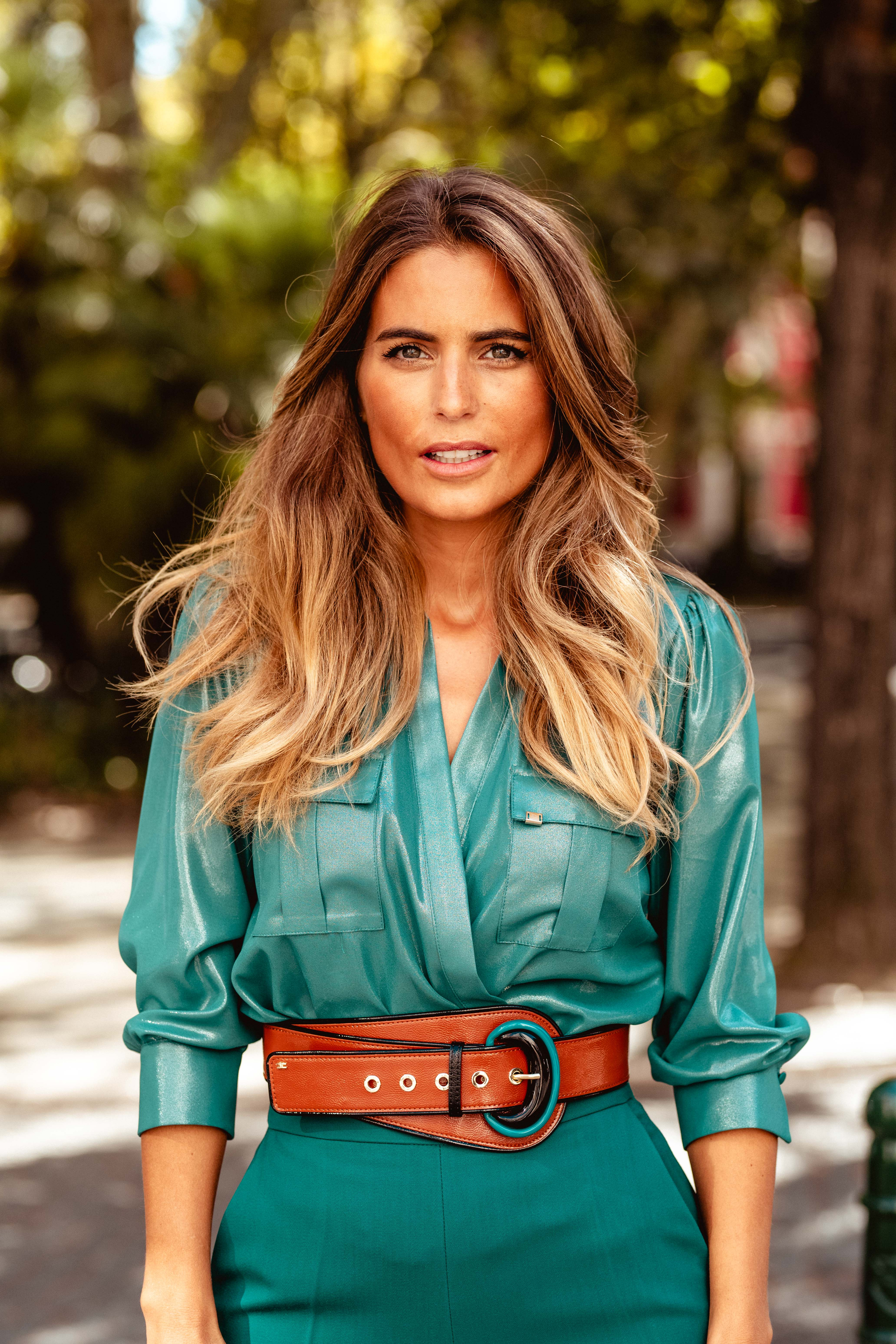
- Starring actress Liliana Santos on the streets of Lisbon
- Born: Liliana Cláudia Ribeiro dos Santos; 22 September 1980 (age 45); Lisbon, Portugal
- Occupations: Actress and model

Liliana Santos (born 22 September 1980) is a Portuguese actress and model.

== Career ==
As a model she has been cover girl for several men's magazines, such as the Portuguese editions of Maxim and GQ.

As an actress she participated in "Queridas Feras" (2004), "Maré Alta" (2004), "Morangos com Açúcar" (2004), "Inspector Max" (2004), "Ninguém Como Tu" (2005), "Câmara Café" (2006), "Floribella" (2006), "Chiquititas" (2007), "Resistiré" (2008) and "Podia Acabar o Mundo" (2008).

Later she was one of the hosts of Portuguese music show "TOP +" and a reporter for "Factor M", a talk show hosted by Merche Romero, both in RTP.

She starred as Raquel in the philosophical drama "Second Life" (2009), from director Miguel Gaudêncio.
