= Mafalda Pinto =

Portuguese actress and model

- Born: Mafalda Rodiles Soares Correia Pinto; 10 February 1983 (age 43); Lisbon, Portugal
- Occupations: Actress, model

Mafalda Rodiles Soares Correia Pinto (born 10 February 1983) is a Portuguese actress and model.

== Career ==
She played one of the main characters, Carlota Antunes, in the second season of the teen hit series "Morangos com Açúcar" (2004/05). Later, she was one of the hosts of the talk-show "6Teen" (2005/06). She has continued to integrate other soap opera casts, such as "Tempo de Viver" (2006), "Floribella" (2006), "Ilha dos Amores" (2007) and "Casos da Vida" (2008).
