= La Patrona =

Spanish-language telenovela

- Genre: Telenovela
- Based on: La dueña by José Ignacio Cabrujas and Julio César Marmol
- Developed by: Valentina Párraga
- Written by: Eduardo Macías; Cristina Policastro; José Vicente Spataro; Rossana Negrín; Valentina Párraga
- Story by: Valentina Párraga
- Directed by: Víctor Herrera McNaught; Carlos Villegas Rosales; Víctor Hugo Martínez
- Starring: Aracely Arámbula; Jorge Luis Pila; Christian Bach; Gonzalo García Vivanco
- Theme music composer: Paco Paniagua, Marlú, José Ángel
- Opening theme: "La Patrona" performed by Aracely Arámbula; "Juntos tú yo" performed by Aracely Arámbula
- Ending theme: "Laberinto" performed by Marger
- Countries of origin: Mexico; United States
- Original language: Spanish (with English subtitles)
- No. of episodes: 128

Production
- Executive producer: Gabriela Valentán
- Production locations: Zacatecas, Querétaro, Mexico City, Mexico, North America,
- Camera setup: Multi-camera

Original release
- Network: Telemundo
- Release: January 7 – July 12, 2013

Related
- Santa Bárbara

La Patrona (lit. 'The Boss') is a Spanish-language telenovela produced by Telemundo and Argos Comunicación. It is a remake of the 1984 Venezuelan telenovela La dueña. It premiered on Telemundo on January 8, 2013, replacing Corazón valiente, and ended on July 9 of the same year, being replaced by Marido en alquiler.

The series stars Aracely Arámbula as Gabriela Suárez, Jorge Luis Pila as Alejandro Beltrán, Christian Bach as Antonia Guerra and Gonzalo García Vivanco as Lucho.

The name reflects a Spanish term for addressing a person recognized as a main boss. However, the title is also a reflection of both the protagonist and the antagonist's struggle to conquer power, authority and respect in a labor field traditionally deemed to be a man's job.

== Plot ==
Gabriela Suárez is the only woman who works in the gold mine that gives life and name to the town of San Pedro del Oro. Gabriela is the daughter of Tigre Suárez, the most experienced miner in the place, but, being a single mother and a woman, suffers the ridicule and abuse of some of the miners. Her strong character makes her rebel against these abuses.

When she was sixteen, Gabriela was friends and related to Fernando, the youngest son of Antonia Guerra, La Patrona, for the inhabitants of San Pedro del Oro, the most powerful and feared woman in town. Gabriela did not want to accept a relationship with Fernando Beltrán and he, hooded, raped her. Gabriela couldn't say who her rapist was, although deep down she always suspected it. She then found out that she was pregnant from that rape and she went to another town to an aunt's house. In complicity with her and with her mother, there she had her son David by her. When she returned to San Pedro after two years, she said that the father of her child was someone who had cheated on her, got her pregnant and had disappeared.

Her son David suffers at school from the teasing and abuse of the miners' children because of his mother's condition. Gabriela lives fighting against that and against her own son who reproaches her for working in the mine with the men.

Gabriela's friend and protector and her father, the majority owner of the mine, dies. Most of the shares become the property of his wife, Antonia Guerra, who we soon learn is the one who has caused his death, like that of her previous husband, to seize most of the shares in the mine.

La Patrona, as Antonia is called, is a fearsome and willful beautiful woman who sends for her eldest son Alejandro Beltrán, handsome and rich, to take care of the mine. This is a confirmed bachelor who does not like to be close to his mother and his brother, but who agrees to temporarily face the management of the mine to prevent it from sinking into the hands of his brother Fernando, alcoholic and useless.

Alejandro's meeting with Gabriela will be a succession of confrontations and attraction that will end in the emergence of a romance that collides with the plans of several characters who will oppose that relationship, mainly Antonia Guerra and Irene Montemar.

El Tigre Suárez tries to show everyone that the mine is drying up and that it is becoming very dangerous. Antonia Guerra and Aníbal Villegas, for their part, try to attract some investors and the position of Tigre hinders them. El Tigre finds a very rich vein of gold in a cave. Those lands are owned by him and Gabriela as a result of an inheritance.

The place is known as La Barranca del Chamuco and is a place where, according to legend, the devil appears. El Tigre has accumulated a large quantity of gold in the cave and manages to tell Gabriela that he is hiding a treasure, but she does not believe him.

Antonia Guerra and her accomplices, for the ambition of gold, and Irene Montemar for stealing Alejandro's love from Gabriela, will conspire to destroy her and El Tigre. Knowing that the father discovered gold, they tortured him to death, without getting him to give up his secret.

They will try to assassinate Gabriela in an explosion from which she escapes by chance, but where several miners and Fernando, Antonia's favorite son, perish. The hatred of La Patrona who blames Gabriela for the death of her favorite is fierce, although Antonia is the real culprit of hers. Gabriela will be accused of having murdered the miners whom she had publicly threatened for making fun of her son.

Alejandro supports her in the trial, however, Antonia's accomplices testify against her for having caused the explosion, for which she is found guilty, but she will be locked up in an asylum run by Aníbal and Antonia, since Gertrudis Aguirre, psychiatrist and director of this place, declares (falsely) before the judge that Gabriela has schizophrenia. There they will abuse her and torture her. Antonia, upon discovering from Irene that David is Fernando's son, decides to attract her grandson and turn him against her mother by showering him with gifts and a rich boy's life.

But in the asylum, Gabriela meets Constanza, the ex-wife of Aníbal Villegas and mother of his son Ricardo, the prosecutor in her case. Constanza is confined there by Aníbal to seize his fortune. And she also meets Lucho Vampa, a mischievous and friendly swindler, a handsome, charming and resourceful man, who has feigned madness in prison, and then, once in the asylum, escapes and achieves his freedom. Lucho will fall madly in love with Gabriela and will become her adviser and friend and a possible triangle with Alejandro.

Gabriela will spend several years in that confinement before they manage to escape in an escape attempt and Gabriela is left for dead in the fire that killed several of those incarcerated there. During that time Alejandro has married Irene, although he has not been able to forget Gabriela. David has become Antonia Guerra's favorite and spoiled grandson. Gabriela recovers her father's treasure and goes abroad with Vampa and Constanza, where the latter receives an incalculable sum of money, an inheritance from her deceased uncle. There, Gabriela is transformed into an elegant, educated, exquisite woman, and at the same time unrecognizable to those who knew the rude and violent miner.

Immensely rich and beautiful, Gabriela returns to town turning her appearance into a social event. Spending money and luxuries, Gabriela leaves everyone speechless and surrendered to her charms, and she begins to carry out her revenge that she has planned with Vampa and Constanza. Aided by Gastón, the town's journalist who has also been a victim of Aníbal and his henchmen, she puts his enemies in the public pillory. One by one her enemies who are on a list are falling: prisoners, mad or dead.

Gabriela will have doubts about Alejandro and the role he played in his destruction and the death of his father. She will face the conflict of recovering her son's love and accepting Alejandro, but for that she has to unmask her main enemy, Antonia Guerra and become La Patrona.

== Cast ==
- Aracely Arámbula as Gabriela Suárez / Verónica Dantés "La Patrona"
- Jorge Luis Pila as Alejandro Beltrán
- Christian Bach as Antonia Guerra "La Patrona"
- Erika de la Rosa as Irene Montemar
- Alexandra de la Mora as Patricia Montemar
- Gonzalo García Vivanco as Luis "Lucho" Vampa
- Julián Moreno as Léon Mélendez "el léon Suarez"
- Christian de la Campa as Alberto Espino
- Aldo Gallardo as Ricardo Villegas
- Kenia Gascón as Prudencia Godínez de Montemar
- Carlos Torres Torrija as Julio Montemar
- Geraldine Zinat as Francisca Mogollón de Suárez
- Marú Bravo as Poncia Jiménez
- Surya Macgrégor as Constanza Goldstein
- Alisa Vélez as Julia Montemar de Beltrán
- Mario Loria as Gastón Goicochea
- Irineo Álvarez as Ramón Izquierdo
- Francisco "Pakey" Vázquez as Macario Gaitán
- Tómas Goros as Ramiro "Lagarto" Chacón
- Bárbara Singer as Valentina Vidal
  - Andrea Bentley as child Valentina
- Martín Barba as David Beltrán Suárez
  - Patricio Sebastián as child David
- Ennio Ricciardi as Maximiliano "Max" Suárez Mogollón
  - Emilio Caballero as child Max
- Manuel Balbi as Fernando Beltrán
- Javier Díaz Dueñas as Tomás "El Tigre" Suárez
- Joaquín Garrido as Aníbal Villegas
- Manola Diez as Lucecita
- Diego Soldano as Rodrigo Balmaceda

== Awards and nominations ==
Year	Award	Category	Recipient	Result
2013	Premios Tu Mundo	Novela of the Year	Valentina Párraga	Won
2013	Premios Tu Mundo	Favorite Lead Actor	Jorge Luis Pila	Nominated
2013	Premios Tu Mundo	Favorite Lead Actress	Aracely Arámbula	Won
2013	Premios Tu Mundo	The Best Bad Boy	Christian de la Campa	Nominated
2013	Premios Tu Mundo	The Best Bad Boy	Tomás Goros	Nominated
2013	Premios Tu Mundo	The Best Bad Girl	Christian Bach	Won
2013	Premios Tu Mundo	Best Supporting Actress	Alexandra de la Mora	Nominated
2013	Premios Tu Mundo	Best Supporting Actor	Diego Soldano	Nominated
2013	Premios Tu Mundo	Best Supporting Actor	Gonzalo García Vivanco	Won
2013	Premios Tu Mundo	The Perfect Couple	Aracely Arámbula and Jorge Luis Pila	Won
2013	Premios Tu Mundo	The Perfect Couple	Christian Bach and Diego Soldano	Nominated
2013	Premios Tu Mundo	First Actress	Christian Bach	Won
2013	Premios Tu Mundo	First Actress	Surya Macgrégor	Nominated
2013	Premios Tu Mundo	First Actor	Javier Díaz Dueñas	Nominated
2013	Premios Tu Mundo	Best Bad Luck Moment	The hospital is engulfed in fire	Won
2013	Premios People en Español	Best Telenovela	Valentina Párraga	Nominated
2013	Premios People en Español	Best Actress	Aracely Arámbula	Nominated
2013	Premios People en Español	Best Actor	Jorge Luis Pila	Nominated
2013	Premios People en Español	Best Female Antagonist	Christian Bach	Nominated
2013	Premios People en Español	Best Male Antagonist	Joaquín Garrido	Nominated
2013	Premios People en Español	Best Supporting Actress	Alexandra de la Mora	Nominated
2013	Premios People en Español	The Perfect Couple	Aracely Arámbula and Jorge Luis Pila	Nominated
2014	Miami Life Awards	Best telenovela	Valentina Párraga	Nominated
2014	Miami Life Awards	Best Male Lead in a Telenovela	Jorge Luis Pila	Nominated
2014	Miami Life Awards	Best Female Lead in a Telenovela	Aracely Arámbula	Nominated
2014	International Emmys	Non-English Language Us Primetime Program	La Patrona	Nominated

== Portuguese adaptation ==
A Portuguese adaptation of the show, titled Santa Bárbara, premiered on TVI on September 28, 2015. Like most adaptions, the episodes and characters are similar to the original.

There is also an English language dubbed version on Peacock streaming service.

== Broadcast ==
The series originally aired from January 8, 2013, to July 9, 2013, in United States on Telemundo.
