= Florbela Oliveira =

Portuguese actress

- Born: Maria Florbela Pereira de Oliveira; 26 April 1974 (age 52); Lisbon, Portugal
- Occupation: actress

Florbela Oliveira (born 26 April 1974) is a Portuguese actress who appeared in Morangos com Açúcar, Dei-te Quase Tudo, Mundo Meu and Médicos de Familía and others.

== TV ==
- Os lobos (1999)
- Diário de maria (1999)
- Médico de Família (2001)
- Espírito da Lei (2003)
- Mundo meu (2005)
- Morangos com açucar (2004/2005)
- Dei-te quase tudo (2005)
- Deixa-me Amar (2008)
