= Hélio Pestana =

Portuguese actor and model

- Born: 25 May 1985 (age 41); Portugal

Hélio Pestana (born 25 May 1985) is a Portuguese actor and model, booked by Layjan agency.

== Biography ==
Pestana studied in D. Pedro V High School and started his acting career in theatre stages, but only became well known at the age of 19, as one of the main cast members of teen series "Morangos com Açúcar" (2004/05), playing Henrique Batista.

After leaving "Morangos com Açúcar", Pestana appeared in the prime-time soap opera "Dei-te Quase Tudo" (2005/06), as Gonçalo Mascarenhas.

Later, Pestana guest starred in the first episode of the Brazilian/Portuguese co-production "Paixões Proibidas" (2007) and he also dubbed the Portuguese version of Chick Hicks in the Disney movie, "Cars"

Hélio Pestana was voted 79th greatest Portuguese of all time in the hit TV show "Os Grandes Portugueses". He was also elected one of the 25 Most Beautiful People in Portuguese Television and he was awarded with the "Mais TV" Award in category Best Break-Through Actor in 2005/2006.

He was one of the leads in "Procura-se", a stage play based on four of Tcheckov's plays.

He has been a student of Architecture and he has completed a dancing course at CEF .

In 2007, Hélio Pestana starred in 5.º Poder, a TV series for Brazilian network Record, as Paulo Monteiro.

From April to August 2008, he played the part of Apostle Matias in the highly successful Felipe La Féria-directed Portuguese version of the musical play Jesus Christ Superstar, by Andrew Lloyd Webber and Tim Rice.
