= Karla Monroig =

Puerto Rican actress

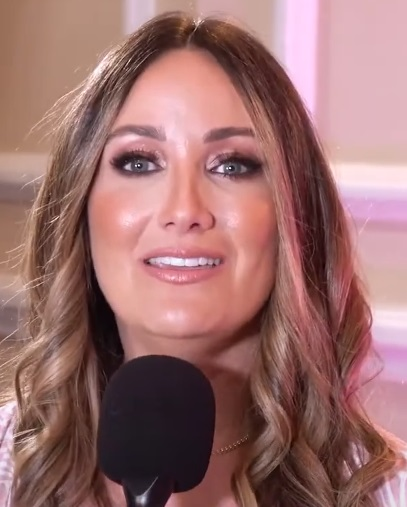
- Monroig in 2023
- Born: March 5, 1979 (age 47); Guayama, Puerto Rico
- Occupations: Actress; model; host
- Years active: 1995–present
- Spouse: Tommy Torres (2008–present)

Karla Monroig (Spanish pronunciation: [ˈkaɾla monˈrojɣ]; born March 5, 1979, in Guayama, Puerto Rico) is a Puerto Rican actress, model and television host.

== Early years ==
Karla Monroig was born in Guayama, Puerto Rico, located on the southern coastal valley region of the island of Puerto Rico. Her father is of Catalan ancestry; her mother, is of Irish ancestry. She went to High school in a private school named ACADEMIA SAN ANTONIO located in her town. She went to college at the Universidad del Sagrado Corazón in Santurce, Puerto Rico, and has a college degree in Communications. In 1995, at the early age of 14, she was the first runner up, of Miss Borinquen Teenage pageant, and she was awarded with the Culture Award. In 1996, Monroig's interest in becoming a model arose, and she started taking modeling lessons in the Refine Institution of Modeling. She participated in the contest Cara de Imagen, (Face of Imagen Magazine), and was the first runner up once more.

== Professional model ==
Immediately, her professional career as a model stirred up. She posed for the covers of several well-known Puerto Rican magazines such as: Buena Vida (Good Life), in 14 consecutive issues, Agenda de Novias (Bride's Agenda), and in "Imagen" (Image), in diverse editions. She's also written editorial articles about beauty and modeling in various paperback periodic publications, such as Tiempos (Times), stating her opinions and giving her perspectives about the subject.

== New scope ==
In the year 2000, her incursions in new territories started broadening her horizons, as she becomes a news reporter, in the entertainment category, in the television talk show, Anda Pa'l Cará, (Gee Whiz), broadcast by Univision, Puerto Rico. As the year came about, she hosted a reality show with Hector Marcano, called Buscados (Most Wanted). In 2001, she hosted another television current issues show called: E-ritmo T.V. (E-rhythm T.V.), in which she interviewed international celebrities, such as Alejandro Sanz, and Chayanne, among others. Also she was the co-host of the variety show Caliente (Hot), in Mexico, broadcast by Televisa.

== Filmography ==
Films
Year	Title	Character	Notes
2002	Más allá del límite		Debut film
2002	Fuego en el alma		Supporting role
2003	Kamaleón		Supporting role
2010	Hunted by Night	Brandon's wife	Film
2012	Going Bananas: A Twisted Love Story	Vicky	
2020	Yerba Buena	Sonia	
2025	Diario: Mujer y Café	Anamaría	Film

Television
Year	Title	Character	Notes
2003	En cuarentena	Xiomara	TV movie
2004–2005	Inocente de ti	Gloria del Junco	Supporting role
2006	Dueña y Señora	Adriana Robles / Amanda Soler	Lead role
2007	Dame chocolate	Samantha Porter / Deborah Porter	
2008–2009	El Rostro de Analía	Isabel Martínez	Main cast
2009–2010	Más sabe el diablo	Virginia Dávila	Main cast
2010–2011	Alguien te mira	Matilde Larraín	Main cast
2011–2012	La casa de al lado	Rebeca Arismendi	Main cast
2018	Mi familia perfecta	Camila Pérez	Supporting role
2020	100 días para enamorarnos	Dulce Barroso	Guest star
2021	La suerte de Loli	Rebeca Diaz	Main cast
2025	Velvet: El nuevo imperio	Samantha White	Guest star
2026	La mesa caliente	Herself	Host

== See also ==
- List of Puerto Ricans
- Inocente de Ti
- Dueña y Señora
- Dame Chocolate
- Valentino Lanús
- Carlos Ponce
- Gladys Rodríguez
