= Benedita Pereira =

Portuguese actress

- Born: Porto, Portugal
- Occupation: Actress
- Notable work: Luzinha A Lenda da Garça (The Legend Of The Heron); Cláudia O Bairro da Fonte (Quarter Of The Source); Joana Duarte Morangos com Açúcar (Strawberries With Sugar); Teresa Albuquerque Ninguém Como Tu (Nobody Like You); Mónica Valentim Tempo de Viver (Time To Live)

Benedita Gonçalves Aires Pereira is a Portuguese actress. She was born in Porto.

She received her training from the Balleteatro Training Centre. She had some periods of training with theater, cinema and television professionals such as Carla Bolito, António Pedro Vasconcelos or Nicolau Breyner.

She made her first appearances in television in A Lenda da Garça (The Legend Of The Heron) (1999) and O Bairro da Fonte (Quarter Of The Fountain) (2002), however it was as the protagonist of the first edition of the youthful series Morangos com Açúcar (2003/04) that she achieved great popularity. She has continued to appear in other soap operas, such as Tempo de Viver (2006) and Ninguém Como Tu (2005).

Whilst attending the Lee Strasberg Institute in New York City, she lived with close friend and fellow Portuguese actress Daniela Ruah. She also starred as voice-over in the 2012 video game Max Payne 3 as Fabiana Branco, a São Paulo socialite.

Benedita has twice won the TV 7Dias award for Best Actress in a Television series. She has appeared on NBC television series The Blacklist and has starred in several American films.

She was directed by Filipe Crawford in the play Ubardo by Luísa Costa Gomes in Teatro Nacional S. João (1998/99) and by Carlos Fraga in the play 1755 O Grande Terramoto (1755 The Big Earthquake) in Teatro da Trindade (2006).
