= Patrícia Tavares =

Portuguese actress

- Born: Sónia Patrícia Tavares Oliveira Matos Ferreira; 6 November 1977 (age 48); Lisbon, Portugal
- Occupation: Actress
- Height: 1.61 m (5 ft 3 in)
- Spouse(s): Pedro Yglésias; André Quartin Santos (2022-present)
- Children: Carolina Flores
- Website: https://www.instagram.com/_patriciatavares_/

Patrícia Tavares (born Sónia Patrícia Tavares Oliveira Matos Ferreira on 6 November 1977 in Lisbon) is a Portuguese actress with a long-standing career.

== Personal life ==
She has a daughter named Carolina (born in 2002) with football player João Flores. She was in relationships with Pedro Yglésias, an architect and Bernardo Jesus, a television producer.

== Career ==
She is currently under contract with TVI, a Portuguese television station, to be part of the cast of the telenovelas that channel creates.
