= Morangos com Açúcar =

- Starring: List
- Country of origin: Portugal
- No. of seasons: 9
- No. of episodes: 2,642

Production
- Running time: 55 minutes

Original release
- Network: TVI
- Release: 30 August 2003 – 15 September 2012

Morangos com Açúcar (lit. Strawberries with Sugar; distributed internationally as Sweet Strawberries) is a Portuguese teen drama. It was broadcast daily on the Portuguese TV station TVI between 30 August 2003 to 15 September 2012. The Portuguese show has also been broadcast in Angola, Syria, Brazil, Romania and Galicia. Based on the early years of the Brazilian series Malhação.

== Format ==
There are two versions of the show: one airs during the normal school year, and the other one, "Férias de Verão" (lit. summer break), airs during the summer months. From the first to the fourth season, the main scenario was a private school. The fifth and sixth seasons took place mainly in a public school, and from the seventh season onwards, in a public arts school.

== Show history and audience shares ==
=== First series (2003–04) ===
- Show Title: Morangos com Açúcar Série I (Strawberries with Sugar Series I)
- Premiere Date: 30 August 2003
- Finale Date: 6 July 2004
- Viewing Share: 30.8%

=== First summer series (2004) ===
- Show Title: Morangos com Açúcar: Férias de Verão - Série I (Strawberries with Sugar: The Summer Vacation - Series I)
- Premiere Date: 7 July 2004
- Finale Date: 14 October 2004
- Viewing Share: 32.5%

=== Second series (2004–05) ===
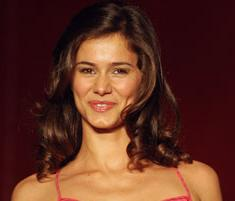
Cláudia Vieira played a main role in the second series.

- Show Title: Morangos com Açúcar Série II (Strawberries with Sugar Series II)
- Premiere Date: 15 October 2004
- Finale Date: 22 June 2005
- Viewing Share: 31.7%

=== Second summer series (2005) ===
- Show Title: Morangos com Açúcar: Férias de Verão - Série II (Strawberries with Sugar: The Summer Vacation - Series II)
- Premiere Date: 23 June 2005
- Finale Date: 19 September 2005
- Viewing Share: 42.1%

=== Third series (2005–06) ===
- Show Title: Morangos com Açúcar Série III: Geração Rebelde (Strawberries with Sugar Series III: The Rebellious Generation)
- Premiere Date: 20 September 2005
- Finale Date: 16 June 2006
- Viewing Share: 38.9%

=== Third summer series (2006) ===
- Show Title: Morangos com Açúcar: Férias de Verão - Série III (Strawberries with Sugar: The Summer Vacation - Series III)
- Premiere Date: 17 June 2006
- Finale Date: 17 September 2006
- Viewing Share: 33.0%

=== Fourth series (2006–07) ===
- Show Title: Morangos com Açúcar Série IV: Espírito Rebelde (Strawberries with Sugar Series IV: The Rebellious Spirit)
- Premiere Date: 18 September 2006
- Finale Date: 16 June 2007
- Viewing Share: 31.0%

=== Fourth summer series (2007) ===
- Show Title: Morangos com Açúcar: Férias de Verão - Série IV (Strawberries with Sugar: The Summer Vacation - Series IV)
- Premiere Date: 17 June 2007
- Finale Date: 16 September 2007
- Viewing Share: 34.8%

=== Fifth series (2007–08) ===
- Show Title: Morangos com Açúcar Série V: Geração Rebelde (Strawberries with Sugar Series V: The Rebellious Generation)
- Premiere Date: 17 September 2007
- Finale Date: 18 June 2008
- Viewing Share: N/A

=== Fifth summer series (2008) ===
- Show Title: Morangos com Açúcar: Férias de Verão - Série V (Strawberries with Sugar: The Summer Vacation - Series V)
- Premiere Date: June 2008
- Finale Date: September 2008
- Viewing Share: N/A

=== Sixth series (2008–09) ===
- Show Title: Morangos com Açúcar Série VI: Geração Rebelde (Strawberries with Sugar Series VI: The Rebellious Generation)
- Premiere Date: 22 September 2008
- Finale Date: 20 June 2009
- Viewing Share: N/A

=== Sixth summer series (2009) ===
- Show Title: Morangos com Açúcar: Férias de Verão - Série VI (Strawberries with Sugar: The Summer Vacation - Series VI)
- Premiere Date: 22 June 2009
- Finale Date: September 2009
- Viewing Share: N/A

=== Seventh series (2009-10) ===
- Show Title: Morangos com Açúcar Série VII - Vive o Teu Talento (Strawberries with Sugar: Live Your Talent - Series VII)
- Premiere Date: 21 September 2009
- Finale Date: 18 June 2010
- Viewing Share: N/A

=== Seventh summer series (2010) ===
- Show Title: Morangos com Açúcar: Vive o Teu Verão - Série VII (Strawberries with Sugar: Live Your Summer - Series VII)
- Premier Date: 19 June 2010
- Finale Date: 18 September 2010
- Viewing Share: N/A

=== Eighth series (2010-11) ===
- Show Title: Morangos com Açúcar Série VIII - Agarra o Teu Futuro (Strawberries with Sugar: Catch Your Future - Series VIII)
- Premiere Date: 20 September 2010
- Finale Date: 24 June 2011
- Viewing Share: N/A

=== Eight summer series (2011) ===
- Show Title: Morangos com Açúcar Série VIII - Vive o Teu Verão (Strawberries with Sugar: Live Your Summer - Series VIII)
- Premiere Date: 25 June 2011
- Finale Date: 9 September 2011
- Viewing Share: N/A

=== Ninth series (2011-12) ===
- Show Title: Morangos com Açúcar Série IX - Persegue o Teu Sonho (Strawberries with Sugar: Follow Your Dream - Series IX)
- Premiere Date: 12 September 2011
- Finale Date: 12 July 2012
- Viewing Share: N/A

=== Ninth summer series (2012) ===
- Show Title: Morangos com Açúcar Série IX - Férias de Verão (Strawberries with Sugar: The Summer Vacation - Series IX)
- Premiere Date: 13 July 2012
- Finale Date: 15 September 2012
- Viewing Share: N/A

=== Film (2012) ===
A film of the series was released on 30 August 2012, and grossed €1,207,647.10.

== Mass hysteria ==
In May 2006, an outbreak of the so-dubbed "Morangos com Açúcar Virus" was reported in Portuguese schools. 300 or more students at 14 schools reported similar symptoms to those experienced by the characters in a then recent episode where a life-threatening virus affected the school depicted in the show. Symptoms of the "virus" included rashes, difficulty breathing, and dizziness. The perceived outbreak forced some schools to temporarily close. The Portuguese National Institute for Medical Emergency eventually dismissed the illness as mass hysteria.

This outbreak raised the concern of some parents regarding the major influence this series has on children who watch it. The story was reported internationally in newspapers, magazines and online.

== Cast ==
=== Notable cast deaths ===
- Bernardino Esteves (popularly known as Dino) was portrayed by Francisco Adam. The character was retired from the series after Francisco Adam died in a car accident in April 2006. In the last episode featuring Dino, the character was seen leaving in a hot-air balloon, and threw his favourite orange-coloured hat onto the ground, where his lover, Susana, took it and kept it as a memento. The entire cast of the telenovela appeared and waved goodbye to the character, and the actor who portrayed him.

=== Celebrities in the series ===
- Sandra Nasić
- Sugababes
- Reamonn
- Simply Red
- Daniel Bedingfield
- Marie Serneholt
- Greg Minnaar
- Grace Mendes
- Asher Lane
- Melanie C
- Sapo
- Sean Kingston
- Carlos Andrade
- Pimpinha Jardim
- EZ Special
- Fingertips
- Anjos
- Nuno Gomes
- João Moutinho
- Cristóvão Vilela
- Paula Teixeira
- Sofia Escobar
- David Carreira
- Carlota Pessoa
- Alex Ignatiev
- António Melo

== Child sexual abuse ==
In July 2012, Henrique Jales was sentenced to five years in prison for sexually abusing a child while casting for the show for TVI.

== See also ==
- Cláudia Vieira
- Benedita Pereira
- Joana Solnado
- Hélio Pestana
- Mafalda Pinto
- Dalila Carmo
- Patrícia Candoso
- Francisco Adam
- Dânia Neto
- Ana Guiomar
- Patrícia Tavares
- Liliana Santos
- Júlia Belard
