= 1981 in Spanish television =

This is a list of Spanish television related events in 1981.

== Events ==
- 10 January: Fernando Castedo is appointed Director General of RTVE.
- 23 February: Following the 1981 Spanish coup d'état attempt, the headquarters of Televisión Española in Prado del Rey are occupied by armed forces.
- 24 February: TVE broadcasts a message of King Juan Carlos I, that entails the failure of the coup d’état.
- 21 May: Journalist Iñaki Gabilondo is dismisses as Head of TVE News Department.
- 24 October: Carlos Robles Piquer is appointed Director General of RTVE.
- 5 December: Francisco wins the Festival de la OTI, with the song Latino, representing TVE.

== Debuts ==
Title	Channel	Debut	Performers/Host	Genre
Al cierre	La 2	1981-04-20	Joaquín Arozamena	News
Alcores	La 1	1981-11-15	Manuel Toharia	Cultural/Science
Bla, bla, bla	La 1	1981-04-24	Jesús María Amilibia	Variety show
Blanco y negro	La 1	1981-09-07	Mari Cruz Soriano	Music
Cerámica popular española	La 2	1981-08-11		Cultural/Science
Cervantes	La 1	1981-04-20	Julián Mateos	Drama series
Consumo	La 1	1981-09-27	Rafael Romero	Cultural/Science
Crónica 3	La 1	1981-04-20	Pedro Macía	News
Deporte para todos	La 1	1981-11-16	Narciso Ibáñez Serrador	Sport
El actor y sus personajes	La 1	1981-07-03		Theatre
El carro de la farsa	La 2	1981-10-13	Rosana Torres	Children
El colibrí	La 1	1981-05-01	José Luis Coll	Comedy
El Testigo	La 2	1991-04-26	Tristán de la Rosa	Talk show
En este país	La 1	1981-05-05	Lalo Azcona	Talk show
Entre dos luces	La 2	1981-04-23	Raúl del Pozo	News
España estuvo allí	La 1	1981-10-01	Federico Volpini	Cultural/Science
Esta noche	La 1	1981-04-23	Carmen Maura	Talk show
Exterior día	La 1	1981-04-26	Olga Viza	Music
Fútbol en acción	La 1	1981-12-05		Cartoon
Gol... y al mundial 82	La 1	1981-11-30	Miguel Vila	Quiz show
Homenaje a la pintura	La 1	1981-09-29	José María Morales	Cultural/Science
News Youth	La 1	1981-04-20	Francisco García Novell	Youth
La bolsa y la vida	La 1	1981-04-24	Isabel Tenaille	Cultural/Science
La cometa blanca	La 1	1981-04-20		Children
La víspera de nuestro tiempo	La 2	1981-10-13	José Antonio Silva	Cultural/Science
Lápiz y papel	La 1	1981-04-26	Ángel Quesada	Quiz show
Los primeros 25 años de TVE	La 1	1981-10-26	Laura Valenzuela	Variety show
Mano a mano	La 1	1981-04-20	Joaquín María Puyal	Talk show
Mis terrores favoritos	La 1	1981-10-12	Narciso Ibáñez Serrador	Movies
Música, maestro	La 1	1981-04-23	Carlos Tena	Music
Objetivo	La 1	1981-04-21	Luis Pancorbo	Documentary
Oficios para el recuerdo	La 1	1981-07-14		Cultural/Science
Otras cosas	La 1	1981-10-09	Joaquín Prat	Variety show
Patos y ocas	La 1	1981-04-24	Máximo	Comedy
Por tierras lejanas	La 1	1981-10-04	Alberto Oliveras	News
Realizado por...	La 2	1981-10-18		Theatre
Refrito	La 1	1981-05-08	Forges	Comedy
Sabadabada	La 1	1981-01-03	Mayra Gómez Kemp	Children
Su turno	La 1	1981-01-07	Jesús Hermida	Talk show
Tauromaquia	La 1	1981-04-23	Joaquín Jesús Gordillo	Bullfighting
Theatre Real	La 2	1981-10-24		Music
Tertulia con...	La 1	1981-04-19	Fernando Fernán Gómez	Talk show
Tiempo y marca	La 1	1981-05-03	José Ángel de la Casa	Sport
Tierras y profundidades	La 1	1981-10-01	Eduardo Admetlla	News
Tome la palabra	La 1	1981-04-25	Alfonso Díez	Variety show
¿Un mundo feliz?	La 1	1981-05-06	Felipe Mellizo	Cultural/Science
Universiada 81	La 1	1981-02-22		Sport
Vamos a ver	La 1	1981-04-25	Marisa Medina	Variety show
Voces sin voz	La 1	1981-10-18	Manuel Torreiglesias	Variety show
Verano azul	La 1	1981-10-11	Antonio Ferrandis	Drama series
Zarabanda	La 2	1981-07-09		Variety show

== Television shows ==
=== La 1 ===
- Telediario (1957– )
- Revista de toros (1971–1983)
- Estudio estadio (1972–2005)
- Informe Semanal (1973– )
- El gran circo de TVE (1973–1983)
- Gente joven (1976–1987)
- Hablamos (1977–1982)
- 300 millones (1977–1983)
- Parlamento (1978–2014)
- Aplauso (1978–1983)
- Vivir cada día (1978–1988)
- Un Mundo para ellos (1979–1983)
- Más vale prevenir (1979–1987)
- De cerca (1980–1982)
- Informativo juvenil (1980–1982)

=== La 2 ===
- La Clave (1976–1983)
- Retrato en vivo (1979–1982)
- Musical express (1980–1983)

== Ending this year ==
=== La 1 ===
- Estudio 1 (1965–1981)
- Teatro breve (1966–1981)
- Siete días (1974–1981)
- 625 Lineas (1976–1981)
- Gente hoy (1976–1981)
- El Canto de un duro (1978–1981)
- Gaceta cultural (1979–1981)
- La Mansión de los Plaff (1979–1981)
- Cosas (1980–1981)

=== La 2 ===
- Ficciones (1971–1981)
- Polideportivo (1973–1981)
- Revista de cine (1974–1981)
- A fondo (1976–1981)
- Encuentros con las letras (1976–1981)
- Más allá (1976–1981)
- Horizontes (1977–1981)
- Popgrama (1977–1981)
- Teatro estudio (1977–1981)
- Imágenes (1978–1981)
- Opinión pública (1978–1981)

== Foreign series debuts in Spain ==
English title	Spanish title	Original title	Channel	Country	Performers
A Town Like Alice	Una ciudad como Alice		La 1	AUS	Helen Morse
Against the Wind	Contra el viento		La 1	AUS	Jon English
All Creatures Great and Small	Todas las critaturas grandes y pequeñas		La 2	UK	Christopher Timothy
B. J. and the Bear	Billie Joe y su mono		La 1	USA	Greg Evigan
Blake's 7	Los siete de Blake		La 1	UK	Gareth Thomas
–	Bo y Bobek	Bob a Bobek	La 2	CZE	
Brendon Chase	El bosque de Brendon		La 1	UK	Paul Erangey
Centennial	Centennial		La 1	USA	Robert Conrad, Richard Chamberlain
Cloppa Castle	Castillo de Cloppa		La 2	UK	
Disraeli	Disraeli		La 1	UK	Ian McShane
East of Eden	Al Este del Edén		La 1	USA	Jane Seymour
–	El libro gordo de Petete	El libro gordo de Petete	La 1	ARG	
Fall of Eagles	La caída de las águilas		La 2	UK	Curd Jürgens
Hammer House of Horror	La casa del terror		La 1	UK	
–	En la plenitud de la vida	Halbzeit	La 1	GER	Iris Berben
In the Beginning	En el principio		La 1	USA	McLean Stevenson
Keep It in the Family	En familia		La 1	UK	Robert Gillespie
Life on Earth	Vida en la Tierra		La 2	USA	
Lillie	Lillie		La 1	USA	Francesca Annis
Love in a Cold Climate	Amor en clima frío		La 1	UK	Judi Dench
Matt and Jenny	Matt y Jenny		La 1	CAN	Megan Follows
Nero Wolfe	Detective Nero Wolfe		La 1	USA	William Conrad
Once Upon a Time... Space	Érase una vez... el espacio	Il était une fois... l'Espace	La 1	FRA	
Playing for Time	Música para sobrevivir		La 1	USA	
Popeye	Popeye		La 1	USA	
Quinn Martin's Tales of the Unexpected	Desenlace inesperado		La 1	USA	William Conrad
Rafferty	Rafferty		La 2	USA	Patrick McGoohan
Seagull Island	La isla de la gaviota	L'isola del gabbiano	La 1	ITA	Prunella Ransome
Shades of Greene	Sombras de Greene		La 1	UK	
Soap	Enredo		La 1	USA	Cathryn Damon, Katherine Helmond
Sons and Lovers	Hijos y amantes		La 1	UK	Eileen Atkins
Spiderman	Spiderman		La 1	USA	
Sport Billy	Sport Billy		La 1	USA	
--	Fantasmas bajo la noria	Spuk unterm Riesenrad	La 1	GER	Katja Paryla
The Barkleys	Los honrados Barkleys		La 1	USA	
The Benny Hill Show	El Show de Benny Hill		La 2	UK	Benny Hill
The Goodies	The Goodies		La 1	UK	Tim Brooke-Taylor
The Incredible Hulk	El increíble Hulk		La 2	USA	Bill Bixby, Lou Ferrigno
The Kids from 47A	Los chicos del 47-A		La 2	UK	Christine McKenna
The New Adventures of Flash Gordon	Flash Gordon		La 2	USA	
The New Avengers	Los nuevos vengadores		La 1	UK	Patrick Macnee, Gareth Hunt, Joanna Lumley
The Odd Couple	La extraña pareja		La 1	USA	Tony Randall, Jack Klugman
The Paper Chase	Vida de estudiante		La 1	USA	James Stephens, John Houseman
The Tony Randall Show	Las tribulaciones del Juez Frankin		La 1	USA	Tony Randall
The Secret Lives of Waldo Kitty	Las vidas secretas de Waldo Mitty		La 2	USA	
Tinker Tailor Soldier Spy	Calderero, sastre, soldado, espía		La 1	UK	Alec Guinness
Upstairs, Downstairs	Arriba y abajo		La 2	UK	David Langton, Gordon Jackson
–	Los visitantes	Les visiteurs	La 1	FRA	Josep Maria Flotats
Will Shakespeare	Will Shakespeare		La 1	UK	Tim Curry

== Births ==
- 14 January – Rosa López, Cantante (participante en OT y representante de España en Eurovisión).
- 17 January – Daniel Diges, actor.
- 4 February – Lorena Castell, hostess.
- 12 February – Ana Ibáñez, journalist.
- 14 February – Gonzalo Miró, host.
- 22 April –
  - Bernabé Fernández, actor.
  - Marta Larralde, actress.
- 23 April – Uri Sabat, host
- 30 April – Ana Ibáñez, journalist & hostess.
- 13 May – Érika Reija, journalist.
- 30 June – Àlex Casademunt, host & singer.
- 6 July – Elena Ballesteros, actress.
- 18 September – Aitor Luna, actor.
- 29 September – Nuria Marín, hostess.
- 23 October – Leticia Dolera, actress.
- 5 November – Javier Pereira, actor.
- 14 November – Álex García, actor
- 20 November – Tamara Falcó, hostess.
- 23 November – Álex Barahona, actor.
- 30 November – María Castro, actress.

== Deaths ==
- 23 January – Miguel de la Hoz, realizador, 38.
- 2 July – Mercedes Prendes, actress, 73.
- 1 August – Álvaro de Laiglesia, guionista, 58.
- 8 September – Alfonso Sánchez, crítico de cine, 70.
- 15 November – Joaquín Pamplona, actor, 57.

== See also ==
- 1981 in Spain
- List of Spanish films of 1981
