= José Antonio Plaza =

Jose Antonio Plaza
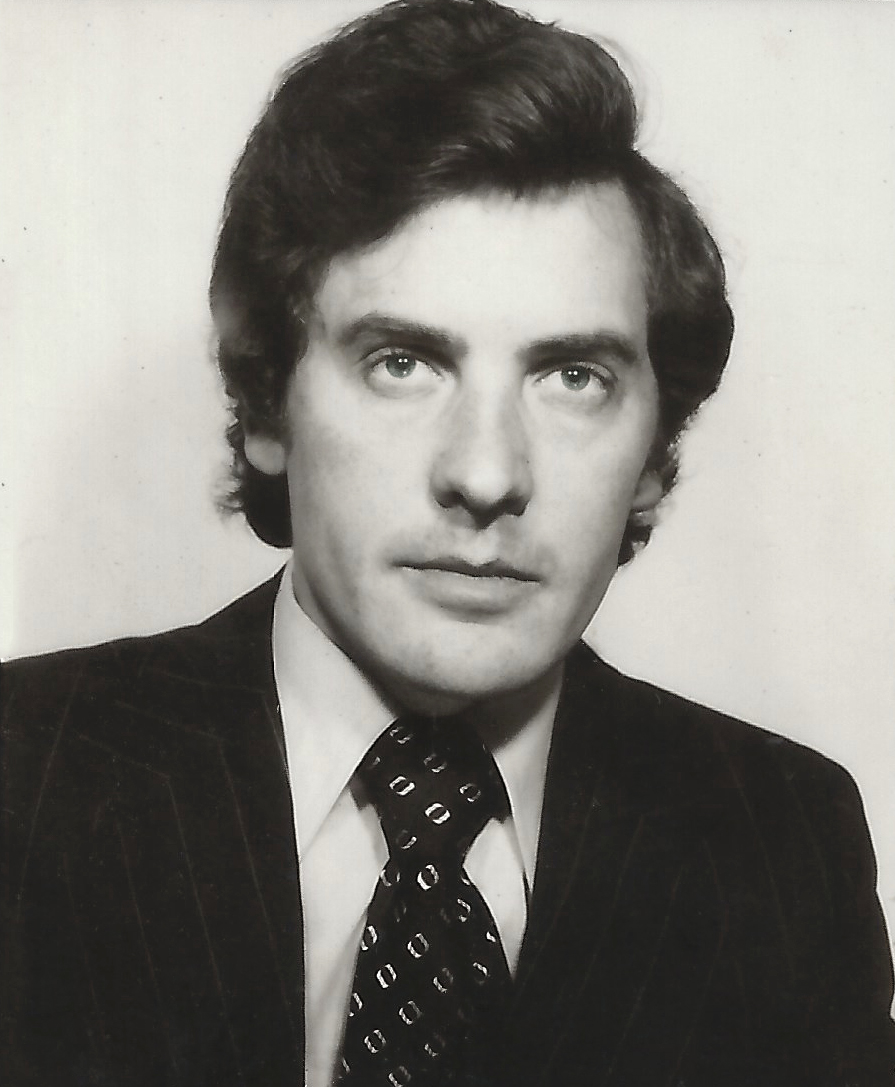
- Born: Jose Antonio Sanz Plaza; 23 May 1939; Segovia, Spain
- Died: 22 November 1998 (aged 59); Madrid, Spain
- Occupations: Journalist, Television director, Host
- Years active: 1961-1998

José Antonio Plaza (23 May 1939, in Segovia – 22 November 1998, in Madrid) was a Spanish journalist, and television director and host.

== Biography ==
After studying law and journalism he began work at the Pueblo newspaper, and at Radio Madrid, on the program Cabalgata Fin de Semana. After a stint at La Voz de Madrid, he joined Radio Television Española's program, Plaza de España. In 1961 he began working for the network's news services. In 1968 he became foreign correspondent in London for both Spanish national radio and television, a position he held for six or seven years. He, along with fellow-foreign correspondent Jesus Hermida in New York, was part of a new wave of young journalists who offered a more modern style of reporting, slightly pushing the restrictive boundaries imposed by the Franco regime on freedom of expression.

Upon his return, he combined his work in front of the camera with directorial responsibilities. As such, he was responsible for the program 35 millones de españoles (1975), along with Alfredo Amestoy; the program focussed on consumer affairs. As a result of his investigatory work for this show, Plaza suffered serious injuries when he was intentionally hit by a car in a failed attempt to silence him. The following week he appeared on the show sporting casts and sitting in a wheelchair. He shared the prestigious Premios Ondas (Nacionales de Televisión) prize for 1975 with Amestoy.

The following year he started the program, 625 Lineas, which he directed, and hosted with Paca Gabaldon and, later, with Mayra Gomez Kemp. The show aired from 18 November 1976 to 5 April 1981, and achieved a solid level of success. It provided interviews with television celebrities and reviewed television shows airing on RTVE. It also included musical numbers and humour. In 1977 Plaza gave up his hosting duties to Juan Santamaria in order to focus on directing.

Two years later, Plaza added a new dimension to the program and hired Tony Saez, a young Canadian of Spanish descent, to coordinate interviews with actors in American television shows airing on RTVE. Among those who appeared during this phase of the program's history were stars from Michael Landon's NBC series, Little House on the Prairie, Melissa Sue Anderson (Mary Ingalls) and Katherine MacGregor (Harriet Oleson).

From 1979 until 1981 the show was hosted by Marisa Abad, Isabel Borondo, Eva Gloria, Marisa Medina, Elena Gutiérrez and Santiago Pelaez.

In 1977 he directed 24 imágenes por segundo a show dedicated to the film industry. In 1978 he hosted 300 millones. During this period he continued his work on 625 lineas.

In 1980 he launched a new program titled Ding-Dong la cocina, with Andres Pajares and Mayra Gomez Kemp, and the children's show, Sabadabada (1981), which turned into a classic of children's television programming in Spain.

During this period he also worked in radio, directing the Antena 3 Radio program Viva la gente divertida. In 1988 he joined the editorial board of the weekly magazine, Panorama.

After working on Aventura 92 in 1989 for Spanish national television (TVE), he returned to Antena 3, where he reunited with Alfredo Amestoy to present Un país de locos, which attempted to reproduce their classic television program 35 millones de españoles.

Plaza was married to Maria Jose Ulla Madroñero, Miss Spain 1964; they had a daughter named Carmen.

=== Death ===
Jose Antonio Plaza died as a result of pneumonia in Madrid after suffering a sudden illness in Valencia, where he was directing a television show for Valencia's regional channel, Canal 9. His remains were cremated at the Almudena Cemetery in Madrid on November 23, 1998.
