= Timeline of the Carnation Revolution =

The following is a timeline of the events of the Carnation Revolution that overthrew the Estado Novo regime in Portugal on 25 April 1974.

== Combatants ==
=== Main MFA forces ===
Main Movimento das Forças Armadas (MFA, "Armed Forces Movement") forces:

- 1st Engineer Regiment: RE 1 (Regimento de Engenharia N.º 1), Lisbon
- Military Administration School: EPAM (Escola Prática de Administração Militar), Lisbon
- 5th Rifle Battalion: BC 5 (Batalhão de Caçadores N.º 5), Lisbon
- 1st Light Artillery Regiment: RAL 1 (Regimento de Artilharia Ligeira N.º 1), Lisbon
- Serra da Carregueira Shooting Range: CTSC (Carreira de Tiro da Serra da Carregueira), Lisbon
- 1st Infantry Regiment: RI 1 (Regimento de Infantaria N.º 1), Lisbon
- Coast and Anti-Aircraft Artillery Instruction Center: CIAAC (Centro de Instrução de Artilharia Antiaérea e de Costa), Lisbon
- Fixed Anti-Aircraft Artillery Regiment: RAAF (Regimento de Artilharia Antiaérea Fixa), Lisbon
- 10th Commando Group (10.º Grupo de Comandos), Lisbon
- Army Infantry School: EPI (Escola Prática de Infantaria), Mafra
- Army Cavalry School: EPC (Escola Prática de Cavalaria), Santarém
- Army Artillery School: EPA (Escola Prática de Artilharia), Vendas Novas
- 3rd Armored Cavalry Regiment: RC 3 (Regimento de Cavalaria N.º 3), Estremoz
- Special Operations Instruction Center: CIOE (Centro de Instrução de Operações Especiais), Lamego
- North Group

=== Loyalist Forces ===
Forces loyal to the government:

- Republican National Guard: GNR (Guarda Nacional Republicana)
- Public Security Police: PSP (Polícia de Segurança Pública)
- General-Directorate of Security: DGS (Direcção-Geral de Segurança)
- Portuguese Legion (Legião Portuguesa)
- 7th Cavalry Regiment: RC 7 (Regimento de Cavalaria N.º 7)
- 2nd Lancers Regiment: RL 2 (Regimento de Lanceiros N.º 2)

== April 24, 1974 ==
- 22:55

Radio Emissores Associados de Lisboa broadcasts Paulo de Carvalho's popular Eurovision song "E Depois do Adeus", the first signal previously arranged by the military to synchronize their operations.

== April 25, 1974 ==
- 00:20

Rádio Renascença broadcasts the words of José Afonso's song "Grândola, Vila Morena" (the song was banned but technically the words were not) : this is the MFA's main go-ahead signal to troops to launch military operations.

- 03:00

Start of the military operations, according to the "Operations General Plan" (Plano Geral das Operações).

- 03:10

Main movements of the MFA forces:

- Headquarters of the Lisbon Military Region occupied by a company of the BC 5

- Rádio Clube Português (a radio station), defended by another company of the BC 5 and occupied by the 10th Commando Group

- Rádio Televisão Portuguesa (the television broadcaster), Lumiar studios occupied by the EPAM

- Emissora Nacional, (the state-owned national radio network), studios occupied by the CTCS

- Positioning of an EPA artillery battery in Almada

- The EPC goes to Terreiro do Paço (downtown Lisbon, where the ministries are located)

- The EPI goes out to occupy the Lisbon Airport

- Companies of the 5th Rifle Battalion occupy the antennas of Rádio Clube Português

- The 5th Commando Group leaves Tomar to engage the RC 7

- A force of the 14th Infantry Regiment joins other forces in Figueira da Foz

- Cadet contingent of the Engineer School leaves Tancos

- The CIOE goes out to occupy the DGS headquarters in Porto

- 04:00

The BC 5 protects the house of General Spínola.

- 04:20

The Rádio Clube Português broadcasts the first announcement of the MFA. The Lisbon Airport is occupied by the EPI.

- 04:45

Broadcast of the second MFA announcement on RCP.

- 05:15

The Tires air-field is occupied by the CIAAC. Broadcast of the third MFA announcement on radio.

- 05:45

The EPC occupies Terreiro do Paço. Broadcast of the fourth MFA announcement.

- 06:00

The EPC lays siege to the ministries, the Lisbon City Hall, the approaches to the Civilian Government, the Banco de Portugal and the Marconi Radio headquarters.

- 06:30

A platoon of the RC 7, a unit loyal to the government, arrives at Terreiro do Paço, led by Second-Lieutenant David e Silva who, after talks, joins the MFA with the platoon under his command.

- 06:45

The MFA Command Post (RE 1, located in Pontinha, outskirts of Lisbon) learns that Marcelo Caetano, Prime-Minister, is in the GNR Carmo Headquarters (Lisbon).

- 07:00

The North Group goes to the Peniche Fort, a DGS prison. The 2nd Heavy Artillery Regiment takes up position near the Arrábida Bridge in Porto and the EPA near Cristo-Rei, in Almada. In Terreiro do Paço, officers of the Military Police and Captain Maltez of the PSP, join Captain Salgueiro Maia, after talks.

Emissora Nacional Progama 1 airs in the beginning of its broadcast that day an address of support for the MFA.

- 07:30

Broadcast of another MFA announcement. Arrival at Ribeira das Naus (near Terreiro do Paço) of a new force of the RC 7, led by Lieutenant-Colonel Ferrand de Almeida.

- 08:00

A force of the RL 2, enemy of the MFA, takes up position in Ribeira das Naus. Lieutenant-Colonel Ferrand de Almeida is arrested by Salgueiro Maia.

- 08:30

A PSP force arrives at Terreiro do Paço but doesn't even try to engage Salgueiro Maia's troops.

- 09:00

The frigate Gago Coutinho - part of NATO forces on exercises - takes up position in front of Terreiro do Paço, receiving orders to fire on Maia's troops, but doesn't obey orders from the Navy Command.

- 09:30

The Defense, Information and Tourism, Army, and Navy ministers, the Chief of General Staff, the Military Governor of Lisbon, the under-secretary of State of the Army and Admiral Henrique Tenreiro escape through a hole that they opened in the wall of the Ministry of the Army and go to the RL 2, where they set up the Command Post of the forces loyal to the government.

- 09:35

Forces loyal to the government, led by Brigadier Junqueira dos Reis, arrive at Terreiro do Paço.

- 10:00

In Ribeira das Naus, Second-Lieutenant Fernando Sottomayor, of the RC 7, doesn't follow Brigadier Junqueira dos Reis' orders to fire on Salgueiro Maia and his troops, which prompts the Brigadier to arrest Sottomayor and to order the soldiers to fire. The soldiers also refuse, so Junqueira dos Reis fires two warning shots into the air, leaves, and goes to Arsenal Street.

- 10:30

Surrender of Major Pato Anselmo, of the RC 7, and broadcast of a new MFA announcement, the first on RTP as it begins the broadcast day.

- 10:45

In Arsenal Street, Brigadier Junqueira dos Reis gives order to fire on Lieutenant Alfredo Assunção, who was sent by Salgueiro Maia to negotiate with the forces of Junqueira dos Reis. Having again been disobeyed by his troops, he ends up punching Lieutenant Assunção three times.

- 11:30

The MFA Command Post orders a military column, led by Major Jaime Neves, to occupy the Portuguese Legion in Penha de França (Lisbon) and a column, led by Salgueiro Maia, to the Carmo Headquarters, where Marcelo Caetano, Rui Patrício (Minister of Foreign Affairs) and Moreira Baptista (Minister of Information and Tourism) were hiding. Salgueiro Maia leads the EPC forces that will besiege the GNR Headquarters, in Carmo, Lisbon.

- 11:45

The MFA informs the country, through Rádio Clube Português and through a TV update, that it is now responsible for the overall national situation, declaring "the time for national liberation has arrived!" It repeats earlier warnings for the people to stay at home but, given that the residents of Lisbon had come out in support of the MFA, it comes to naught.

- 11:50

The officers that were arrested in Terreiro do Paço are sent to the MFA Command Post, in Pontinha.

- 12:00

A force of the RI 1 tries to stop the EPC column from reaching the Carmo Headquarters, but Salgueiro Maia convinces them to join him.

- 12:15

The EPC column, led by Salgueiro Maia, arrives at Chiado, through the Carmo Street, together with a crowd of civilian supporters.

- 12:30

The forces of Salgueiro Maia besiege Carmo and receive orders from the MFA Command Post to open fire on the GNR Headquarters, to force Marcelo Caetano and the Armed Forces General Staff to surrender.

- 12:45

The crowd distributes food, milk and cigarettes to the troops stationed in Carmo. GNR forces, loyal to the government, take up positions on the rear of Salgueiro Maia's troops.

- 13:00

Brigadier Junqueira dos Reis tries to besiege Salgueiro Maia's forces with the help of the GNR, riot police, and a company of RI 1. Forces of RC 3 arrive at the Salazar Bridge, now 25 de Abril Bridge and head to Carmo. A new MFA announcement is broadcast.

- 13:30

A Portuguese Air Force attack helicopter flies over Carmo, causing anxiety in the troops and civilians.

- 13:40

MFA forces occupy the headquarters of the Portuguese Legion, forcing the surrender of its leadership and personnel assigned to Lisbon.

- 14:00

The company of RI 1 that supported Junqueira dos Reis joins Salgueiro Maia. Talks begin, through mediators, between General Spínola and Marcelo Caetano, to obtain the surrender of the Prime Minister.

- 14:30

Broadcast of a new MFA announcement, informing that the main objectives were occupied. The RC 3 squadron, led by Captain Ferreira, besieges the troops of Brigadier Junqueira dos Reis.

- 15:00

Following an order of the Command Post, Salgueiro Maia, using a megaphone, makes an ultimatum to obtain the surrender of the GNR, threatening to blow up the gates of the Carmo Headquarters. A new MFA announcement is broadcast.

- 15:15

EPA forces receive orders to free the troops detained in the Trafaria Fort, following the events of March 16 (an early attempt at a military coup d'etat).

- 15:30

Firing on the front of the Carmo Headquarters, ordered by Salgueiro Maia, which forces the talks for the surrender of Marcelo Caetano to restart.

- 16:15

Elements of the DGS open fire on the crowd that surrounds its headquarters, in António Maria Cardoso Street, causing four deaths and wounding several civilians.

- 16:25

Resulting from the lack of progress of the negotiations for the surrender of Marcelo Caetano, Salgueiro Maia, puts an armoured vehicle in front of the Headquarters and begins the countdown to open fire. Suddenly he is interrupted by Pedro Feytor-Pinto and Nuno Távora, from the Information and Tourism State Department, who carries a message from General Spínola to Marcelo Caetano. Salgueiro Maia authorizes the entry of those two messengers into the Headquarters.

- 16:30

Telephone contacts between Spínola, Marcelo Caetano and the MFA Command Post.

- 17:00

Salgueiro Maia enters the Carmo Headquarters and demands the surrender of Marcelo Caetano, who replies by saying that he would only surrender to a General-Officer from the MFA so that the Power doesn't "fall in the street". The MFA Command Post, in response, mandates General Spínola to go into the Carmo Headquarters to receive the surrender of Marcelo Caetano.

- 17:30

Broadcast of another MFA announcement.

- 18:00

Spínola arrives at Carmo and, joined by Salgueiro Maia, enters the Headquarters to talk to Marcelo Caetano.

- 18:20

Broadcast of a new MFA announcement.

- 18:30

A Chaimite (a Portuguese armoured personnel carrier) vehicle enters the Carmo Headquarters to carry Marcelo Caetano to Pontinha.

- 18:40

MFA declaration on RTP.

- 18:45

Law 171/74: abolishment of the DGS, Portuguese Legion and Portuguese Youth takes immediate effect.

- 19:00

Marcelo Caetano and the ministers Rui Patrício and Moreira Baptista board the Chaimite, surrendering to the MFA forces as a result.

- 19:30

Salgueiro Maia ends the siege to Carmo and drives Marcelo Caetano and the ministers to the MFA Command Post, in the Chaimite, completely surrounded by an enormous crowd shouting "Victory! Victory! Victory!". The crowd is all over Lisbon during the course of the Chaimite to the Command Post and, about 20 minutes later, a new MFA announcement is broadcast on radio.

- 20:00

Broadcast of the MFA press release through the Rádio Clube Português.

- 21:00

The Chaimite arrives at the MFA Command Post with Marcelo Caetano and the two ministers, who are detained there until the next day. Forces from the Navy join the MFA, forcing the DGS to surrender and the elements that fired on the crowd are arrested.

- 22:00

Paratrooper forces arrive at Caxias prison (Lisbon), where the DGS still fights on. A new announcement of the MFA is broadcast.

- 23:30

Laws that officially force the resignations of the fascist leaders and (through 171/74) abolish the DGS, Portuguese Legion and Portuguese Youth are approved.
