= António Sala =

Portuguese radio and television presenter, and journalist (born 1949)

- Born: 1949 (age 76–77); Portugal
- Occupations: Radio and television presenter and Journalist

António Manuel Sala Mira Gomes (born in 1949) is a Portuguese radio and television presenter and journalist, as well as a singer and songwriter. He has worked in various capacities throughout his life, including as a singer, music producer and composer, journalist, radio director, radio host and television presenter. After a quite noteworthy career with the Maranata musical ensemble he achieved nationwide success with Rádio Renascença's "Despertar", the morning radio show that was a Portuguese popularity phenomenon in the 1980s and 1990s. He was once vice-president of Sport Lisboa e Benfica.

== Life and career ==
António Sala was born in 1949 in Vilar de Andorinho, Vila Nova de Gaia, in Northern Portugal. It was on the radio that António Sala stood out the most, making his debut in 1967, at Rádio Ribatejo and Emissores Associados de Lisboa, from where he later moved to Radiodifusão Portuguesa. At the end of the 1960s, he took his first steps in music taking advantage of his studies in choral singing. He came to prominence as a member of the Maranata, a music group founded in 1972.

In 1978, he was voted announcer of the year, in what was the first of many awards he won thanks to his work as a radio presenter and director, mainly on Rádio Renascença's "Despertar" program, which aired for 18 years. Between 1981 and 1994, with the Renascença's "Despertar", the morning radio show that was a popularity phenomenon in the 1980s and 1990s and brought together António Sala in Lisbon and Olga Cardoso from Porto between 7 and 10 am, he completely dominated the national scene in this field, winning awards from Casa da Imprensa, TV Guia magazine and Nova Gente magazine. Some live broadcasts were considered innovative at the time in the country, such as those made in Vienna (Austria), Stuttgart (Germany), Seville (Spain), Macau and Expo'98 (Lisbon), or on board of planes, boats and submarines.

In 1979, he composed the hit song "Zé Brasileiro Português de Braga", in partnership with Vasco Lima Couto, which was performed by Portuguese singer Alexandra at the RTP "Festival da Canção". In 1980, again at the RTP "Festival da Canção", António Sala won the prize for best performer, along with José Cid and Alexandra. At the same time, while working in radio and music, Sala also worked in television, starting in the 1970s with the program "Música Maestro", which was followed by many others, including the competitions "Palavra Puxa Palavra" and "Um, Dois, Três", the Portuguese version of Spanish TV program Un, dos, tres... responda otra vez, in 1994 and 1995, when Sala replaced Carlos Cruz.

In 1984, he began writing jokes, an endeavour he repeated two years later due to the success of the first publishing. In 1987, he published a book of poetry entitled Palavras Despidas de Música (Words Stripped of Music). In 1995 and 1996, António Sala started teaching Journalism and Social and Cultural Communication at the Catholic University of Portugal in Lisbon. Also in 1996, he released a double CD entitled Trinta Anos de Carreira (Thirty Years of Career), featuring his greatest hits. In fiction, he presented the novel Império de Brandos Costumes (2000). Between 1997 and 2000, he was also vice-president of Sport Lisboa e Benfica (SL Benfica). He was responsible for the unsuccessful creation of a club television channel during João Vale e Azevedo's controversial presidency of SL Benfica.

== Personal life ==
António Sala is married to Elizabeth Sala and has a son called Miguel Sala. His father's name was Arlindo Gomes and he played the accordion without knowing music and painted without any training. His mother, Carmen Sala, was a poet. As a boy, Sala dreamed of being a director or a pianist.
