= 625 Líneas =

- Created by: Jose Antonio Plaza
- Country of origin: Spain
- Original language: Spanish

Production
- Running time: 60 minutes
- Production company: Televisión Española

Original release
- Network: TVE1
- Release: November 18, 1976 – April 5, 1981

625 Líneas (English: 625 Lines) was a program broadcast on La Primera Cadena of Televisión Española on Sunday afternoons from November 18, 1976 to April 5, 1981. It provided interviews with television celebrities and reviewed television shows airing on Televisión Española's channels. It also included musical numbers and humour.

== Origin of the name ==
When the program was broadcast, the PAL encoding system was predominantly used for analog television broadcasts in Europe, Asia, Africa, and some South American countries. Television sets during this period were primarily black-and-white, though early color models were also available. These sets typically featured a resolution of 625 interlaced lines at 25 frames per second and an aspect ratio of 4:3.

The program's name is a reference to the 625 lines that made up the television image used in most of Europe and parts of Africa, Asia and Oceania under the PAL system (as opposed to the 525 lines used in North, Central and parts of South America and Asia under the NTSC system).

== History ==
The show was created by Jose Antonio Plaza, a Spanish journalist and television director. Plaza directed, and hosted with Paca Gabaldon and, later, with Mayra Gomez Kemp. The show achieved a solid level of success. In 1977 Plaza gave up his hosting duties to Juan Santamaria in order to focus on directing.

Two years later, Plaza added a new dimension to the program and hired Tony Saez, a young Canadian of Spanish descent, to coordinate interviews with actors on American television shows airing on Televisión Española. Among those who appeared during this phase of the program's history were stars from Michael Landon's popular NBC series Little House on the Prairie, Melissa Sue Anderson (Mary Ingalls) and Katherine MacGregor (Harriet Oleson).

From 1979 until 1981 the show was hosted by Marisa Abad, Isabel Borondo, Eva Gloria, Marisa Medina, Elena Gutiérrez and Santiago Peláez.

== Content ==
The one-hour program aired on Sunday afternoons with the purpose of providing viewers an overview of the programming scheduled to be broadcast by the network in the upcoming seven days.

The concept of the program was not original, as Televisión Española (TVE) had previously aired programs that promoted upcoming content. Its distinguishing feature, which contributed to its popularity, was the incorporation of elements typical of variety shows, including interviews, musical performances, and the use of humor.

In the late 1970s, the program hired Tony Sáez, a Canadian of Spanish descent, to coordinate interviews with actors from American television shows aired by TVE. Notable guests who appeared on the set of 625 Líneas included Melissa Sue Anderson and Katherine MacGregor, cast members of Little House on the Prairie, as well as Robin Ellis from Poldark.

The program's original theme music was a rendition of Aaron Copland's Hoedown, performed by the band Emerson, Lake & Palmer. This version appeared on their 1972 album Trilogy and reflects the symphonic rock style of the period.

== Presenters ==
During the initial run of the program from 1976 to 1977, it was presented by the program's director, José Antonio Plaza, alongside actress Paca Gabaldón. They were joined by Roxana Dupré, a Dominican national, who became the first presenter of color in the history of Spanish television.

For a period of several months, the children's programming segment was presented by José María Pascual, known for performing the theme songs from the animated series Marco. He initially appeared alongside José Antonio Plaza and Paca Gabaldón, and later with Mayra Gómez Kemp and Juan Santamaría. His participation ended following a directive from the Ministry of Labor, which prohibited his continued involvement due to his status as a minor.

Beginning in September 1977, José Antonio Plaza and Paca Gabaldón were replaced as presenters by Mayra Gómez Kemp and Juan Santamaría, who would go on to become the program’s longest-serving hosting duo. For several months in 1978, Victoria Abril, who later achieved recognition as a film actress in Spain, was responsible for the music segment. Gómez Kemp and Santamaría remained on the program until 1979. José Antonio Plaza continued to serve as the program’s director during this period.

From 1979 until the program's cancellation in 1981, presenting duties were carried out by Marisa Abad, Isabel Borondo, Eva Gloria, Marisa Medina, Elena Gutiérrez, and Santiago Peláez. In 1979, Peláez also assumed the role of program director.

== Comedians ==
Throughout the program's five-year run, numerous comedians contributed performances. Among the most notable were Tip and Coll, who gained recognition during Spain's Transition period for their parody of a news broadcast, popularizing the phrase "Next week we'll talk about the government." Despite their popularity, the comedy duo experienced censorship during this time.

The program also marked the television debut of comedic actress Beatriz Carvajal in 1978. Other comedians who appeared on *625 Líneas* included Andrés Pajares, performing as the character "El Currante" in 1978; the duo of Juanjo Menéndez and Jesús Puente (1979–1980); and Juanito Navarro and Simón Cabido, who reprised their character "Doña Croqueta" during its peak popularity.

In 1978, the Argentine singers María Eugenia, María Laura, and María Emilia, known collectively as the "Golden Triplets," who had previously performed as backup vocalists for Julio Iglesias, also appeared on the program.

== Awards ==
- Premio Ondas (1978).
- TP de Oro (1977 y 1978) for Tip y Coll as Most Popular Personalities.
- TP de Oro (1978) to Mayra Gómez Kemp, as Best Host.
