= The Death of Me Yet =

- Screenplay by: A.J. Russell
- Story by: Whit Masterson
- Directed by: John Llewellyn Moxey
- Starring: Doug McClure
- Music by: Pete Rugolo
- Country of origin: United States
- Original language: English

Production
- Producer: Aaron Spelling
- Cinematography: Tim Southcott
- Editor: Art Seid
- Running time: 73 min.
- Production company: Aaron Spelling Productions

Original release
- Network: ABC
- Release: September 18, 1971

The Death of Me Yet is a 1971 television film directed by John Llewellyn Moxey and starring Doug McClure and Darren McGavin. It based on the 1970 novel of the same name by Whit Masterson. The movie appeared on the ABC Movie of the Week on October 26, 1971.

== Plot ==
Edward Young lives in Middletown, seemingly an idyllic 1950s small town. On returning home, he finds a letter that his unit has been activated, so he says a farewell to his girlfriend, Alice. He packs and leaves the town, which is revealed as a KGB training facility for sleeper agents. He has one final debriefing from Robert Barnes, his KGB superior. He spends the following years in the United States, rising to the position of newspaper publisher in Redwood Beach, California under the name Paul Towers. Preparing to visit his brother-in-law, Paul goes diving for abalone but is nearly killed when his SCUBA tank starts feeding him carbon dioxide instead of oxygen. His wife Sibby dives in to save him.

Edward's brother-in-law, Hank Keller, is the head of a defense contractor where an executive's recent suicide has drawn the attention of the FBI. Vandamm, the victim, was homosexual and was being blackmailed by the Soviets for plans to a secret sonar system. Hank wants Paul to fill the vacant position. FBI agent Joe Chalk questions him harshly at the dinner and promises to thoroughly investigate his background for his security clearance, which concerns Paul.

At a formal dinner party, Paul is called away due to problems with the newspaper presses. As he gets into his car, he is taken by surprise by a KGB agent, Nylec, in the back seat. The agent promises, "This time, the obituary will be real." Paul manages to overcome Nylec, knocking him off the pier. But he can't bring himself to shoot the agent in the water.

He returns home, where Sybil believes he's keeping secrets from her and runs out of the room. He finds a pregnancy test which is positive. Deciding to come clean, he visits Joe Chalk's hotel room and confesses his true identity and how he assumed Paul Towers' identity after he decided to defect and failed to board a plane that crashed with no survivors. Chalk is skeptical of his story but Paul bargains, offering to identify Barnes, whom he believes was Vandamm's KGB contact. Paul returns home where he still keeps the truth from Sibby but tells her he will accept the job.

Paul contacts an attorney who can put him in touch with Barnes. He's told to go to a street corner, which he recognizes as the model for Middletown. Alice is there. They bargain for the plans and reminisce. Afterward, Chalk arranges to give certain sheets of plans to trap Barnes with.

Paul gets a notice on his car to go to an old mine. A helicopter intercepts him on a dirt road and Barnes gets out of it. He explains that he saw Paul's picture under an editorial and recognized him, hence the attempts to kill him. Paul gives him the sheets but Barnes is unsatisfied. He has a plan for Paul to photograph the most critical sheets. One day at lunch, Nylec sets fire to a car to distract Chalk so Paul can copy the plans. Paul and Chalk make plans for Paul to identify Barnes for arrest as he leaves their meeting.

At a restaurant, Barnes appears, identifying himself as Dr. Shevlin, Sibby's boss. He hints that he's holding Sibby hostage and her safety depends on his own continued freedom. Paul identifies an innocent bystander to Chalk and goes to Sibby's workplace, where he finds her unconscious. Alice confronts him at gunpoint as he pleads for Sibby's life. Nylec enters to kill Paul. Alice shoots Nylec to save Paul, who in turn shoots both Paul and Alice.

Chalk stages Paul's funeral and they watch from a helicopter. He tells Paul that with Barnes still on the loose, Sibby cannot be safe if anyone suspects Paul is still alive. Paul, again a man who does not legally exist, reluctantly agrees to help the FBI track down the other sleeper agents, who have all adopted new covers.

== Cast ==
- Doug McClure ... Pytor Avanosov/ Edward Young / Paul Towers
- Darren McGavin ... Joe Chalk
- Rosemary Forsyth ... Sibby Towers
- Richard Basehart ... Robert Barnes / Dr Shevlin
- Meg Foster ... Alice
- Dana Elcar ... Hank Keller
- Jean Allison ... Marilyn Keller
- Stephen Dunne ... George Dickman
- Scottie MacGregor ... Nora Queen
- Allen Jaffe ... Nylec
- Sam Edwards ... Jerry
- John Kroga ... Redstone
- Ivan Bonar ... Easley
