= Olga Cardoso =

Portuguese media personality (1934–2025)

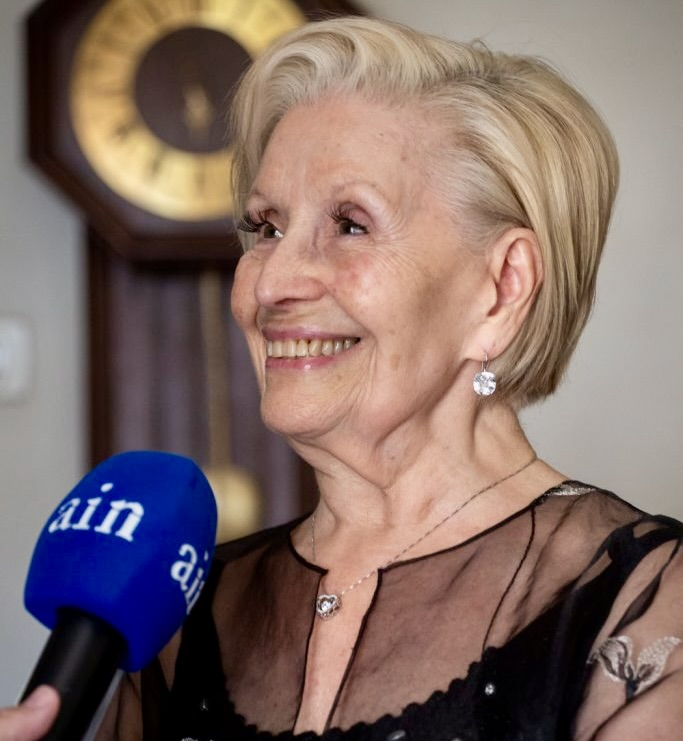
- Cardoso in 2018
- Born: 7 July 1934; Miragaia, Porto, Portugal
- Died: 3 December 2025 (aged 91); Porto, Portugal
- Other names: Olga Amália Cardoso
- Occupations: Radio and television performer
- Awards: Silver Medal of Merit from the City of Porto

Olga Amália Cardoso (1934–2025) was a Portuguese radio announcer, television presenter and singer, best known for her work on Rádio Renascença and her role as A amiga Olga (My Friend Olga) on Televisão Independente (TVI).

== Early life ==
Cardoso was born in the former parish of Miragaia in the municipality of Porto on 7 July 1934. In 1949, at only 15 years old, she was invited to voice soap operas or radio dramas at ORSEC (Oficinas de Rádio, Som, Electricidade e Cinema) in Porto. Later she also worked at Rádio Porto and Rádio Clube do Norte and also contributed to programmes to be broadcast to Portugal's colonies.

== Career ==
In December 1960, Cardoso joined the Catholic Rádio Renascença, where she became a newsreader. Between 1979 and 2000 she presented the daily programme Despertar (Awaken), on that station, first with Fernando de Almeida and later with António Sala, with whom the show gained considerable popularity. The show was aired from 07.00 to 10.00, with Cardoso in Porto and her co-host in Lisbon. She also presented children's programmes. Cardoso took part in one play, Hotel Sarilhos, at the Teatro Sá da Bandeira in Porto, and recorded the singles Bom dia (Amor)/O Último A Rir (Polygram, 1984) and Cor de Rosa Claro (1988).

In 1987, Cardoso received the Silver Medal of Merit from the City of Porto. She made her television debut at the age of 59, to present the contest A Amiga Olga! on Televisão Independente (TVI), which aired in 1993 and 1994. Despite its considerable success the programme was cancelled in 1994: she never understood why. She then presented other programmes for a short period, including a programme of advertisements, called TVI Shopping Centre. In 1999, she decided to end her career. The last broadcast of Despertar aired on 28 January 2000. However, she returned to Rádio Renascença a year later to present Clássicos da Renascença together with Sala in a series that lasted for a few months.

Cardoso then moved to Coimbra and, for several years, where she hosted a programme for regional radio stations. Until 2015 she also worked in public relations. In 2012 she presented the Baile da Rosa awards in Porto.

== Personal life and death ==
Olga Cardoso was married to Virgílio Cardoso for 37 years until his death. He had worked for a pharmaceutical company. They had three children and four granddaughters.

Cardoso was diagnosed with Parkinson's disease at the age of 80, but did not reveal this until 2022. She died in the early hours of 3 December 2025 at the Santo António Hospital in Porto, one day after a severe stroke. Cardoso was 91. The Portuguese president, Marcelo Rebelo de Sousa noted that she "left a mark of sympathy and friendship on the faces of many thousands of listeners".
