= Velia Martínez =

American actress (1920–1993)

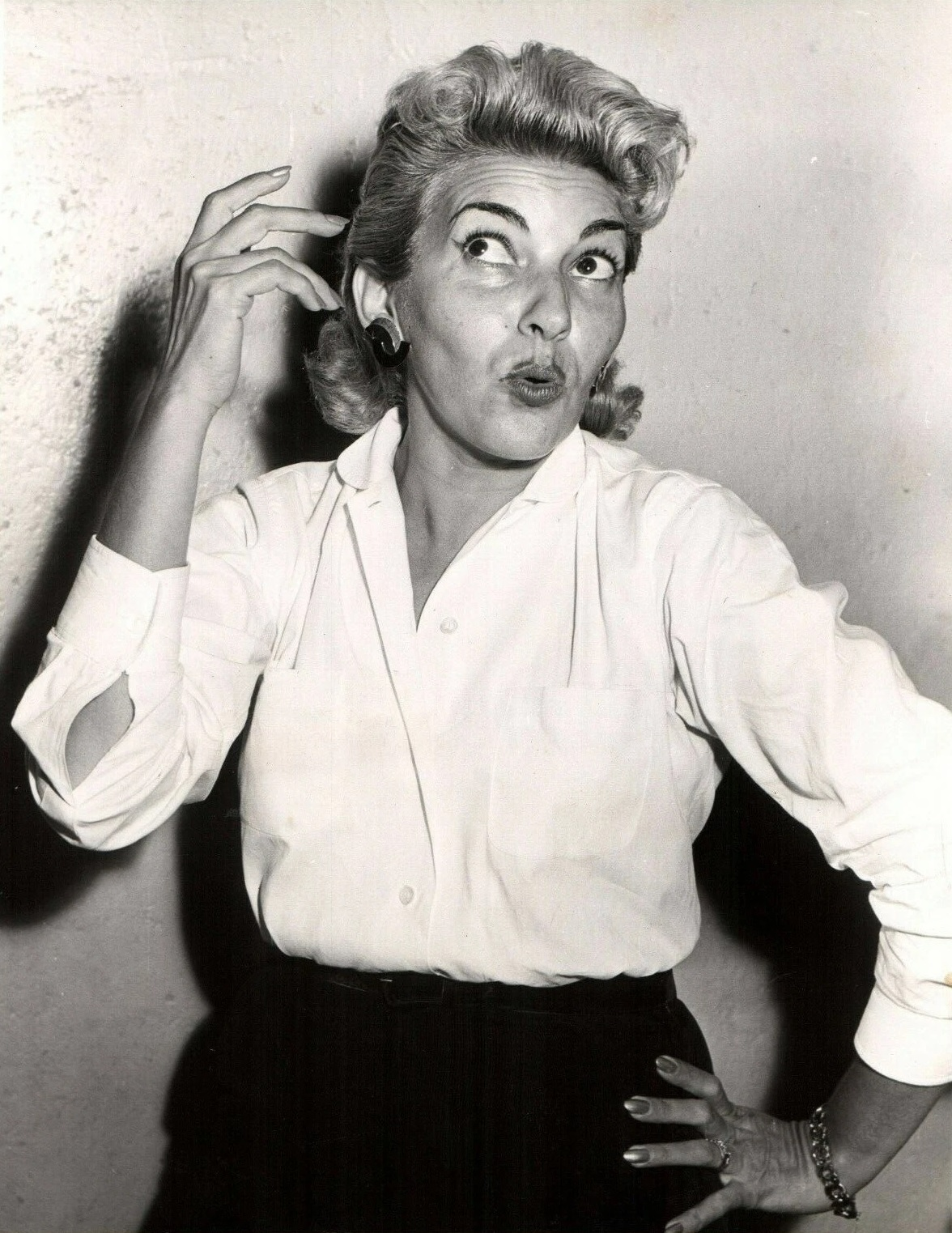
- Martínez in 1957
- Born: Velia Martínez Febles; June 20, 1920; Tampa, Florida, U.S.
- Died: May 22, 1993 (aged 72); Miami, Florida, U.S.
- Occupation: Actress
- Spouse: Ramiro Gómez Kemp (m. 1945; died 1981)
- Children: Georgina; Mayra

Velia Martínez Febles (June 14, 1920 – May 22, 1993) was an American actress.

Martínez was born in Tampa, Florida to Cuban parents. In 1941, she settled in Havana, where she became a well-known show business personality. In 1945, while in Mexico, she married the Cuban actor, producer and writer, Ramiro Gómez Kemp (1914–1981). They had two daughters, Georgina and Mayra.

Martínez was an accomplished dancer and cabaret star, she performed in Cuba's most prestigious theaters including the Cabaret Montmartre. In 1945, she played the title role in the play Filomena Marturano in Havana's Thalia Theater, which is considered her pivotal role in her career. In 1958 she acted opposite Errol Flynn in the movie The Big Boodle. She left Cuba in 1960 with her family and lived two years in Puerto Rico where she appeared in a TV soap opera Yo Compro Esa Mujer (I'll Buy That Woman). In 1962, she came to Miami and continued performing on stage. In 1965 she appeared in My Son Is Not What He Appears (Mi Hijo No Es Lo Que Parece), at the Martí Theater. In 1966, she appeared in the movie, The Devil's Sisters as Carmen Alvarado.

In 1977, she reached the pinnacle of popularity as the grandmother Adela in the PBS series ¿Qué Pasa, USA?. Her last great performance on stage was in 1989 in Luis Santeiro's play, Mixed Blessings at the Coconut Grove Playhouse and her last television role was of Elena, a hair salon owner in the Univision series Corte Tropical in 1992.

== Selected filmography ==
- Madman and Vagabond (1946)
