= Emissores do Norte Reunidos =

Defunct Portuguese radio network (1953–1975)

Emissores do Norte Reunidos was a Portuguese radio network based out of Porto and operational between 1953 and 1975. Its counterpart for southern Portugal was Emissores Associados de Lisboa.

The network was formed in 1953, from the commercial union between CS2 XE Rádio Ideal (founded in 1931), CS2 XJ O.R.S.E.C. Oficinas de Rádio, Som, Electricidade e Cinema (founded in 1931) and CS2 XB Rádio Clube do Norte (founded in 1947). The new company was established in February 1953 operating under the call sign CSB 5, with the stations time-sharing with each other in periods of four or five hours. Notable figures that worked at the station included Olga Cardoso (later at Rádio Renascença), Ilídio Inácio and Alfredo Alvela.

By 1962, all radio stations closed at midnight, but the situation changed with the arrival of independent production companies. In this year, the midnight-1am slot was filled by Última Hora, by Carlos Silva, and from 1am to 2am, by Rádio Record Portuguesa, owned by António Ferrer, Domingos Parker and José Jorge da Silva. It also had the first overnight radio program in Porto, Quando a noite passa, which aired from 2am to 5am on the early hours of Saturday morning beginning in late 1962.

The management of the station was up to Rádio Porto (established in 1926). The initial scheme was having the several stations broadcasting on a time-share basis but on separate frequencies, but due to the 1948 Copenhagen Plan, the stations moved to a single frequency (1602KHz). The antenna installed in Canidelo, Vila Nova de Gaia, gave ENR a strong signal for the region north of the Mondego River. Each station had its own studios, usually located in electronics houses associated to them.

Programs such as Festival were seen as an antithesis to Emissora Nacional and Rádio Clube Português by trying to erase all influences of the New State from the former and the Anglo-American musical preference of the latter.

On 2 December 1975, the government nationalized both the ENR and EAL networks into the RDP network. Under RDP, the former CSB 5 began carrying RDP Programa 3's Porto station, which was later renamed Rádio Comercial Norte.
