= Cristina García Ramos =

Spanish journalist (born 1949)

- Born: 14 September 1949 (age 76); Santa Cruz de Tenerife, Spain
- Education: University of La Laguna
- Occupations: Journalist, presenter
- Spouse: Diego Carcedo

Cristina García Ramos (born 14 September 1949) is a Spanish journalist.

She has a degree in Journalism and in Philosophy and Literature from the University of La Laguna. She began her professional career at the Televisión Española (TVE) Production Center in the Canary Islands, where she appeared on programs such as Tele-Canarias and Panorama de Actualidad.

In 1979 she moved to Madrid to take over the presentation of Telediario 2nd edition. Later she would present the weekend edition, a job she held until 1983. Her news experience allowed her to broadcast live the events of the 23-F coup attempt.

In the following years she presented different programs on the public network, from the cultural to the economic: 300 millones, La víspera de nuestro tiempo, Dentro de un orden, etc.

Beginning in 1993, García Ramos presented and directed the premier gossip show on Spanish television: Corazón, corazón, a program which garnered her recognition and great popularity. In 2008, as a result of layoffs at TVE, she left the network after 30 years of service. She went to work at Radio Televisión Canaria.

From her first marriage, with a TV cameraman, she has one daughter named Thais (born 1975), who is a sociologist and has given her two grandchildren. Cristina García Ramos is currently married to journalist Diego Carcedo.

== TV career ==
- Tele-Canarias (1977), TVE Canarias
- Panorama de actualidad (1978), TVE
- Telediario (1979–1983), TVE
- 300 millones (1982), TVE
- Esta semana (1982–1983), TVE
- La víspera de nuestro tiempo (1983–1984), TVE
- Dentro de un orden (1984–1986), TVE
- A través del espejo (1988–1990), TVE
- Corazón, corazón (1993–2008), TVE
- Sin secretos: Así somos los canarios (2009–2010), TV Canaria
