= Ángel Garó =

Spanish actor and comedian

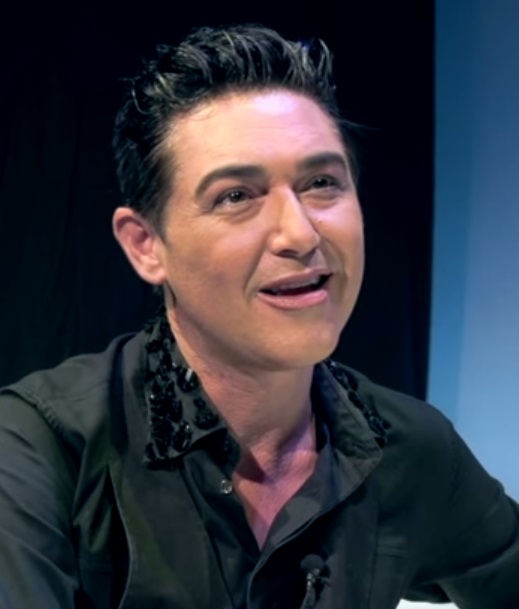
- Born: Ángel Paredes Hortelano; 12 January 1965 (age 61); La Línea de la Concepción (Cádiz), Spain
- Occupations: Actor, voice actor, comedian
- Years active: 1990-present

Ángel Paredes Hortelano (La Línea de la Concepción, 12 January 1965) better known as Ángel Garó is a Spanish actor and comedian. He lives in Málaga.

He became very popular in the 1990s thanks to his performances in Un, dos, tres... responda otra vez and his show Personas humanas. He dubbed all the characters of the movie FernGully: The Last Rainforest in Spain, and he has taken part in different programs like Noche de Fiesta or Mira quien baila.

== Career ==
Ángel Garó began studying drama at the age of 10, alternating between different artistic activities: painting, sculpture, poetry, etc. At 14, he joined the Candilejas theater group and later continued his drama studies at the Municipal Theater School directed by actor Augusto García Flores. It was here that he made his mark as a rhapsodist, giving recitals wherever he was asked to perform. He moved to Madrid and was awarded a scholarship by Professor Cristina Rota, thus beginning his career as a stand-up comedian.

His first television appearance was in 1989, on the program Pero ¿esto qué es? (But What Is This?), performing an imitation of Lola Flores and a prototype of his later character Chikito Nakatone, here called Chikago Mipeo. He rose to popularity in 1991 thanks to his appearances on the game show Un, dos, tres... responda otra vez and his show Personas humanas. In his performances, he frequently resorted to using characters with diverse personalities, notably Juan de la Cosa, Pepe Itárburi, Maruja Jarrón, and Maruchi, mainly during his participation in the television program Un, dos, tres.

In 1992, Garó entered the Guinness World Records for having dubbed all 32 characters in the film FernGully: The Adventures of Zak and Crysta into Spanish on his own, as well as creating virtually all of the sound effects in the film, an achievement that no other voice actor has been able to match to date.

He has performed in major theaters throughout Spain, including: the Teatro Cervantes (Málaga) in Malaga, the Nuevo Teatro Alcalá, the Calderón Theater in Madrid, the Gran Teatro in Cordoba, the Gran Teatro in Huelva, the Gayarre Theater, the Bretón de los Herreros Theater, the Romea Theater (Murcia), the Filarmónica Theater, the Florida Theater, the Principal Theater (Burgos), the Teatro Emperador in León, etc.

He also ran a restaurant-museum, La Casa del Ángel (Málaga), where works of significant artistic value (his collection includes more than four hundred works of art from the 15th to the 20th century) were combined with Andalusian cuisine. He no longer runs the restaurant, which he still owns (now called El Palco), and his art collection has been moved to La Casa de la Juventud in Estepona, where it is open to the public.

In 2008, he starred in the music video for the song “Veneno” by the Seville trio Son de Sol, from the album Directo A Ti. The video was filmed at the Guadalpin Byblos hotel in April 2008.
