= 300 millones =

Spanish variety show

- Genre: Variety show
- Directed by: José Joaquín Marroquí; Gustavo Pérez Puig; Enrique Llovet
- Theme music composer: Alfonso Santisteban
- Country of origin: Spain
- Original language: Spanish

Production
- Running time: 1 hour (approx)
- Production company: Televisión Española

Original release
- Network: TVE-1 and other OTI stations
- Release: 26 June 1977 – 22 March 1983

300 millones is a weekly Spanish musical and cultural television variety show produced by Televisión Española (TVE). It aired between 1977 and 1983 on TVE-1 in Spain and transmitted via satellite to all member stations of the Organización de Televisión Iberoamericana (OTI) in Hispanic America and the United States, which aired it in their countries. It was also aired in Equatorial Guinea, the Philippines and the Netherlands Antilles.

== Format ==
300 millones is a weekly variety show with musical performances, cultural and news reports, interviews and contests. It had a large-budget and top Spanish and Hispanic American guests, with each episode running for around an hour. Top international performers also appeared on the show to break into the Spanish-speaking market. The name of the show comes from the number of Spanish-language speakers around the world at the time, 300 million people.

The show had several presenters throughout its history, including: Jana Escribano (1977), Lalo Azcona (1977), Ricardo Fernández Deu (1977), Guadalupe Enríquez (1977–1983), Tico Medina (1978–1983), Paca Gabaldón (1977–1978), José Antonio Plaza (1978), Alfredo Amestoy (1977–1981), Kiko Ledgard (1978–1979), Marisa Abad (1979), Pepe Domingo Castaño (1979–1983), Lola Martínez (1981–1982) and Cristina García Ramos (1982).

== Broadcast ==
The show was produced by Televisión Española (TVE) in its studios in Prado del Rey and had the support of the Organización de Televisión Iberoamericana (OTI).

It was broadcast on TVE-1 in Spain (Note: The pilot first episode was broadcast live on TVE-2 on Sunday 26 June 1977 just after midnight –which was actually Monday 27 in peninsular Spain–. On 24 July, it started its weekly edition that, due the good reception of the pilot, was broadcast on TVE-1.) and transmitted via satellite to the OTI member stations in Argentina, Bolivia, Colombia, Costa Rica, Chile, the Dominican Republic, Ecuador, El Salvador, Guatemala, Honduras, Mexico, Nicaragua, Panama, Paraguay, Peru, Puerto Rico, the United States, Uruguay and Venezuela, which broadcast it in their territories. In the United States it was broadcast on the Spanish International Network (SIN). It was also broadcast in Equatorial Guinea, the Philippines and the Netherlands Antilles.

It was initially broadcast live on Sundays which, due to the time difference between continents, meant producing and airing it in peninsular Spain after midnight –actually on Monday–, at the time when domestic TVE broadcasts used to close earlier. Three versions of each episode were made later, one for Spain, another for the United States and Puerto Rico and a third for the rest of the countries, similar to the one for Spain but adding a few minutes of information about football, that were broadcast at a more convenient time.
