= Mayra Gómez Kemp =

Cuban-Spanish television host and actress (1948–2024)

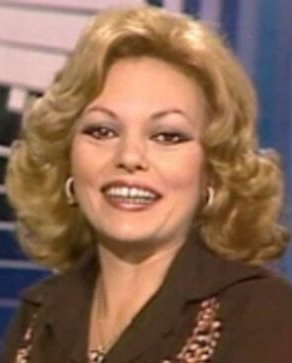
- Gómez Kemp in 1977
- Born: Mayra Cristina Gómez Martínez; 14 February 1948; Havana, Cuba
- Died: 13 October 2024 (aged 76); Madrid, Spain
- Occupations: Television host; actress; singer
- Years active: 1967–2024
- Notable work: Un, dos, tres... responda otra vez
- Parents: Ramiro Gómez Kemp; Velia Martínez

Mayra Cristina Gómez Martínez (14 February 1948 – 13 October 2024), better known as Mayra Gómez Kemp, was a Cuban-Spanish television host, actress and singer. She was the host of Un, dos, tres... responda otra vez from 1982 to 1988.

She was the first woman in the world to host a TV quiz show.

== Life and career ==
Mayra Cristina Gómez Martínez Kemp Febles was born on 14 February 1948 in Havana, Cuba. She was the daughter of two famous Cuban artists, Ramiro Gómez Kemp and Velia Martínez. She had an older sister named Georgina, who is an accountant in Miami. On 1 February 1960, her family moved to Puerto Rico, later moving to Venezuela and finally settling in Miami. In 1966, as a college student she appeared in the William Grefé-directed "B"-movie The Death Curse of Tartu, under the stage name Mayra Christine. In the 1970s, Mayra went to Spain to perform in the Spanish theatrical production of The Rocky Horror Show. On stage, she worked alongside Argentine actor Alberto Berco who played the role of the narrator, who in time became her husband.

In 1976, when the successful Televisión Española game show Un, dos, tres... responda otra vez returned to television to be broadcast in color for the first time, Mayra auditioned for the role of one of the secretaries on the program. Although she wasn't selected as a secretary, she was hired to perform small roles as a comic actress on the show and Mayra's appearances made her famous by the time she left the show in 1977.

That year, Mayra teamed with two of the show's former secretaries, María Durán and Beatriz Escudero, to form the pop vocal band Trío Acuario (Aquarius Trio because that was the zodiac sign of all three women). With Mayra as lead vocalist, they enjoyed a brief but intense popularity thanks to their vocal skills and their charmingly sexy image, scoring a summer hit with Rema, Rema, Marinero ("Row, Row, Sailor"). Mayra left the group in 1978 to pursue a solo career, recording the album Una Dama (One Lady), which included her cover of Julio Ramos's anti-abortion pop hit "No Te Dejan Nacer" ("They Won't Let You Be Born").

She began her career as a television presenter on Television Española programs such as 625 Lineas (her debut as presenter and first TP de Oro out of four as best presenter) and Ding Dong. Mayra also returned to film in 1978 with Donde Hay Patrón..., starring alongside Manolo Escobar. After becoming a Spanish citizen, Mayra turned to radio as one of the original announcers on the new station Antena 3 (now defunct). Along with other presenters she appeared on the children's show Sabadabada, later titled Dabadabada. She left Dabadabada in 1982 when she was chosen by Chicho Ibáñez Serrador as a substitute for Kiko Ledgard, the famous host of Un, dos, tres... responda otra vez, who had suffered a near-fatal accident. Mayra won the audience over and remained with the program for six years, longer than any other host, earning three more TP awards for best host.

After leaving the show in 1988, she continued working on radio and hosted the chat show Tres mas Una on regional station Canal Sur.

With the launch of commercial television in Spain in 1989, Mayra returned to television and hosted La Ruleta de la Fortuna, Spain's version of Wheel of Fortune on Antena 3 TV, until 1991. On the same channel, she fronted the talk show Simplemente Mayra. After La Ruleta de la Fortuna, she hosted the regional show Luna de miel in 1992.

After then, Mayra's television appearances slowed, appearing on the occasional regional show. In 1996, she hosted the medical program El ritmo de la vida on Madrid-based Canal 7. She last hosted a show in 1999 for the cookery-based game show Tomates y Pimientos (Antena 3 TV). She appeared sporadically as a talk show guest on various programs, and gave numerous interviews. She made contributions to Menta y Chocolate (Antena 3 TV), Salsa Rosa, Dolce Vita, A Tu Lado and TNT (Telecinco).

At the end of 2006, she appeared on the second season of the stand-up contest show El Club de Flo (LaSexta), winning second place. In 2007, she briefly appeared on the show A 3 Bandas (Antena 3 TV). In 2008 she appeared regularly as a guest on the morning talk-show Sin ir más lejos (Aragón TV).

In October 2009, she revealed that in January of the same year she had been diagnosed with tongue cancer, for which she had surgery. While not resulting in any threat to her life, it affected her speech, making it initially impossible for her to talk. Over the course of a year, with the help of speech therapists and specialists, she completely regained her ability to speak, albeit with a slightly affected pronunciation as an after effect of the operation.

In 2010, she began making appearances on shows on Telecinco such as Sálvame Deluxe to talk about her successful recovery from her illness. However, on February 11, 2012, she revealed on La noria that the cancer had returned, this time in her throat. On July 13, she officially announced on Sálvame Deluxe that she was cancer-free.

Gomez Kemp died from complications of a fall in Madrid, on 13 October 2024, at the age of 76.

== Filmography ==
Year	Title	Role	Director	Notes
1966	Death Curse of Tartu	Cindy	William Grefe	
1978	Donde hay patrón	Martirio	Mariano Ozores	

== Notable published works ==
- ¡Y hasta aquí puedo leer! (2014). ISBN 9788401347160

== Awards ==
Year	Award	Category	Work	Result
1979	TP de Oro	Best female host	625 Lineas	Won
1983	TP de Oro	Best female host	Un, dos, tres... responda otra vez	Won
1986	TP de Oro	Best female host	Un, dos, tres... responda otra vez	Won
1988	TP de Oro	Best female host	Un, dos, tres... responda otra vez	Won
2013	Premio Iris − Academia de las Ciencias y las Artes de Televisión de España	Lifetime Achievement		Won
