= Luis Lorenzo (born 1943) =

Spanish actor

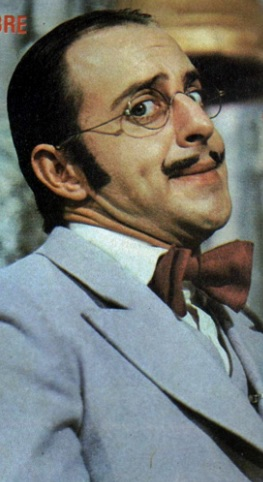
- Luis Lorenzo
- Born: 23 July 1943 (age 82); Madrid, Spain
- Occupation: Actor
- Years active: 1970s–2006

Luis Lorenzo (born July 23, 1943, in Madrid) is a Spanish actor.

He started acting in plays such as an adaptation of The Caucasian Chalk Circle in 1971, but he is more famous for playing the antagonistic role of "Don Menudillo" in the Spanish TV quiz show Un, dos, tres... responda otra vez in 1977.

He later appeared in cinema. His small and fragile physique led him to play shy, timid and meek characters. In theater he played roles in plays such as El lindo don Diego (1990), by Agustín Moreto.

He also played episodic roles in some TV series such as Canguros or Aquí no hay quien viva (2005)

He is married with actress Luisa Armenteros.
