= Manuel Torreiglesias =

Spanish television presenter (1941–2025)

Manuel Antonio Torre Iglesias (16 March 1941 – 19 May 2025), better known as Manuel Torreiglesias, was a Spanish radio and television presenter.

== Life and career ==
Torreiglesias graduated from the University of Salamanca. After arriving in Madrid with the intention of dedicating himself to teaching, he ended up joining Televisión Española in 1964, at the proposal of Eugenio Pena and as a production assistant in the contest Cesta y puntos. In 1968, he graduated in Medicine at the Complutense University of Madrid.

In 1976, he directed and presented The School of Health, a program in which medical topics were discussed, and advice was given to improve the quality of life. In October 1976, he began to present on Radio Nacional de España.

In the early 1990s, he presented Boa saúde on Televisión de Galicia.

On 7 May 2009, he began presenting saber vivir por última vez. The public broadcaster RTVE terminated its contract with Iglesias, citing a 'breach of contract linked to advertising'.

Torreiglesias died on 19 May 2025, at the age of 84.
