= Katherine MacGregor =

American actress (1925–2018)

- MacGregor in Little House on the Prairie, 1979
- Born: Dorlee Deane McGregor; January 12, 1925; Glendale, California, U.S.
- Died: November 13, 2018 (aged 93); Los Angeles, California, U.S.
- Other name: Scottie MacGregor
- Occupation: Actress
- Years active: 1951–1983
- Spouses: Bert Remsen (m. 1949; div. 1950) Edward G. Kaye-Martin (m. 1969; div. 1970)

Katherine MacGregor (born Dorlee Deane McGregor; January 12, 1925 – November 13, 2018) was an American actress who portrayed Harriet Oleson in Little House on the Prairie. She started her career on stage in New York City, in theatres off and on Broadway, credited as Scottie MacGregor.

== Biography ==
Katherine MacGregor was born Dorlee Deane McGregor on January 12, 1925, in Glendale, California, to Ralph S. McGregor and Beatrice E. Willard. When Katherine was a child, her mother Beatrice moved the family to Fort Collins, Colorado, where they lived most of Katherine's early life. She graduated from Northwestern University with a major in drama and moved to New York City in 1949. She was hired by the Arthur Murray Dance Studios as a dance instructor. She studied acting under N. Richard Nash, Sanford Meisner, and Stella Adler. She did summer stock in Lebanon, Pennsylvania, as Dorlee Deane McGregor but switched to using the stage name Scottie MacGregor as her acting career advanced.

Beginning in the 1950s, as Scottie MacGregor, she worked in theatre on and off Broadway in New York City and other locations in plays such as The Seven Year Itch and Handful of Fire, and won such uncredited parts as "a longshoreman's mother" (On the Waterfront); "Alice Thorn" (The Traveling Executioner), and "Miss Boswell" (The Student Nurses). She appeared in numerous episodes of various television series: Love of Life (1956), The Secret Storm, The Nurses, The Play of the Week (1959), East Side/West Side (1963), Mannix (1970–71), Emergency! (1972), Ironside (1972, 1974), and All in the Family (1973), as well as the two 1981 "Heroes vs. Villains" episodes of Family Feud hosted by Richard Dawson. She had roles in the TV movies, The Death of Me Yet (1971), The Girls of Huntington House (1973), and Tell Me Where It Hurts (1974).

When she adopted the use of Katherine as her given name is unclear, but she switched from using ‘Scottie’ as she matured in age on the advice of her manager, and was still credited for her film and television roles as Scottie MacGregor until an early 1974 two-hour episode of Ironside (which served as pilot for the short-lived Amy Prentiss).

Her first screen credit as Katherine MacGregor, and her best-known role, was from 1974 to 1983 in NBC's Little House on the Prairie as Harriet Oleson, the general store owner's wife and a comedic part. MacGregor's favorite description of her character in Little House came in a fan letter from Minnesota in the 1970s, in which Mrs. Oleson was described as "the touch of pepper in the sweetness of the show". In 1979, due to the popularity of Little House in Spain, MacGregor was invited to Madrid, and appeared on RTVE's 625 Lineas and Ding Dong La Cocina programs.

After Little House on the Prairie, she withdrew from screen productions in favor of local theater. She dedicated herself to the Hindu religion, and to teaching acting to children at the Wee Hollywood Vedanta Players, before finally retiring in the early 2000s. In 2014, she did an in-depth interview about her life and career for the book Prairie Memories by Patrick Loubatiere.

== Personal life and death ==
She was married to actor Bert Remsen from 1949 to 1950 and to actor, director, and teacher Edward G. Kaye-Martin, 14 years her junior, from August 1969 to October 1970.

While recovering from alcoholism, MacGregor converted to Hinduism. She was unable to appear in the series finale of Little House on the Prairie, because she was on a pilgrimage to India at the time of the episodes' filming.

MacGregor died on November 13, 2018 at the Motion Picture & Television Country House and Hospital in Woodland Hills, Los Angeles at the age of 93.

== Filmography ==
Year	Film	Role	Notes
1954	On the Waterfront	Longshoreman's Mother	Uncredited
1956	Love of Life	Tammy Forrest #1	Unknown episodes
1959	Play of the Week	Maria	Episode - "The Power and the Glory"
1963	East Side/West Side	Grace Morrison	Episode - "Go Fight City Hall"
1970	The Traveling Executioner	Alice Thorn	Uncredited
1970	Mannix	Nurse Evans	Episode - "The World Between"
1970	The Student Nurses	Miss Boswell	
1971	The Young Lawyers	Mrs. Brady	Episode - "The Bradbury War"
1971	The Death of Me Yet	Nora Queen	TV movie
1971	Mannix	Nurse	Episode - "Run Till Dark"
1972	Ironside	Mrs. Pyle	Episode - "Programmed for Panic"
1972	Emergency!	Myrna Scudder	Episode - "Musical Mania"
1973	The Girls of Huntington House	Rose Beckwith	TV movie
1973	All in the Family	Nurse	Episode - "Edith's Christmas Story"
1974	Tell Me Where It Hurts	Marge	TV movie
1974	Ironside	Irma	Episode - "Amy Prentiss" (Parts 1 & 2)
1974–1983	Little House on the Prairie	Harriet Oleson	153 episodes
