= Brendon Chase =

1944 novel by Denys Watkins-Pitchford

- First edition (publ. Hollis & Carter Ltd.)
- Author: Denys Watkins-Pitchford
- Illustrator: Denys Watkins-Pitchford
- Language: English
- Genre: Fiction
- Publisher: Hollis and Carter
- Publication date: 1944
- Publication place: United Kingdom
- Media type: Print
- Pages: 235 p.
- OCLC: 219788035

Brendon Chase is a children's novel by Denys Watkins-Pitchford, writing as 'BB'. It was published in 1944 but is set at an earlier date. The novel is about three boys living wild in an English forest.

In 1980 Brendon Chase was made into a 13-part TV serial, shown on ITV. The series was also shown in many other European countries and in the United States.

== Plot summary ==
The novel is based around the Hensman brothers, Robin, John and Harold, who spend eight months living as outlaws in the forest of Brendon Chase. As in much British children's literature of the era, their parents are absent, living in India, at the time part of the British Empire. They are cared for by their Aunt Ellen, a strict and somewhat cold spinster. At the end of the Easter holidays, Harold falls ill with the measles, so Robin and John are unable to return to boarding school. They decide to run away and fend for themselves, taking some food from their aunt's house, and also taking a rifle and ammunition so they can survive in the wild.

Despite continued attempts to catch them, usually by Police Sergeant Bunting and the Reverend Whiting, the three brothers - Robin and John are joined by Harold when he recovers from his illness - prove sufficiently quick-witted and ingenious to evade capture for eight months, surviving on what they can kill and on supplies occasionally taken from other sources. In the book Robin is known as "Robin Hood", John as "Big John" and Harold as "Little John".

In the later part of their time living in the wild, the boys - who by this time have long been wearing rabbit skins, their clothes having worn out - encounter an eccentric elderly charcoal burner called Smokoe Joe, who becomes a close friend. When Smokoe Joe is seriously injured, one of the boys saves his life by running for the doctor, thereby risking capture. After a Christmas spent with Smokoe Joe in his hut, the boys are 'run to ground' when the doctor, who has kept their secret until that moment, arrives with their father who has returned, and the story ends there in the forest. The bear that had escaped in the forest near the end of their adventure settles down to hibernate for the winter in the hollow oak tree where they had lived.

== Background ==
Behind the book were hidden tragic elements in the author's own life: Robin, like several of his characters, was named after his son who had died at the age of seven, and the camaraderie of the boys was BB's imagination of the friendships he had never had as a child (having been considered too physically weak to mix with others). His loneliness at this period helped to cultivate his love of nature. The boys' boarding school, Banchester, was inspired by Rugby School where the author taught art.

== TV adaptation ==
The novel was adapted for television by James Andrew Hall, produced by Southern Television in association with RM Productions and Primetime Television in 1980, and shown on ITV from 31 December 1980 to 25 March 1981 (other than in Wales where HTV Wales transmitted it between April and July 1981, after it had been displaced by Welsh-language programmes before the inception of S4C). The European countries in which the series was shown include Germany (as Im Schatten der Eule), the Netherlands (as Het Donkere Bos Brendon Chase), Sweden (as Det stora skogsäventyret) and Norway. In the United States it aired on HBO.

The TV series was filmed mainly around the New Forest and in Portchester, Hampshire (although the setting of the book was inspired more by the author's native Northamptonshire), and was produced and directed by David Cobham with music by Paul Lewis (flute played by James Galway). It contains much striking and poignant wildlife photography.

The Hensman brothers were played by Craig McFarlane (Robin), Howard Taylor (John) and Paul Erangey (Harold). Aunt Ellen is played by Rosalie Crutchley and Smokoe Joe by Paul Curran. Police Sergeant Bunting is played by Michael Robbins and the Reverend Whiting by Christopher Biggins. The new character Monica Hurling is played by Liza Goddard.

Although it was shown more than once in some other countries it only received one transmission in Britain, mainly because of Southern's loss of its ITV contract from 1982 (although Runaround and Worzel Gummidge were repeated after the company had gone off the air). For many years, the series never received any kind of commercial release, whether on VHS or DVD. In 2012 the series was released in Germany, on DVD, containing only the dubbed German language version. in 2015 followed a Dutch release on DVD and Blu-ray, in the original English language, with Dutch subtitles.

=== Plot differences in the TV series ===
In the TV series their mother has died and it is only their father who is abroad. The year is specifically said to be 1925. The boys' nicknames are not used and Christmas is not specifically referred to.

A recurring subplot only in the TV series involves the cynical journalist Monica Hurling from a fictional newspaper called The London Planet, who has written a number of stories stirring up public interest in the Hensman boys, while the paper has offered a £50 reward to whoever can find them. She represents an amoral, sophisticated London, and the conflict between her and the conservative rural community where she is reporting has wider resonance. This character, however, does not appear in the book.

== See also ==
- My Side of the Mountain

== External links (relating to the TV series) ==
- Brendon Chase at IMDb
- Brief review of the series
- Episode guide - note that this link contains some inaccuracies: certain events are placed in the wrong episode and the boys' surname has been misremembered.
