= Emissores Associados de Lisboa =

Defunct group of Portuguese radio stations

Emissores Associados de Lisboa was a grouping of Portuguese radio stations active during the New State regime.

The station started broadcasting some time before the end of World War II, being one of the few radio stations that survived a series of radio station closures in the 1940s.

EAL ran from the association of four radio stations, Rádio Graça, Rádio Peninsular, Rádio Voz de Lisboa and Clube Radiofónico de Portugal. The stations covered southern Portugal. Its counterpart for northern Portugal was Emissores do Norte Reunidos.

One of its four stations (Rádio Voz de Lisboa) had a key role in the Carnation Revolution, on the night of 24 April 1974. At 22:55, the station played E depois do adeus as a launching signal. Minutes before the signal was played, the station was plagued by technical issues.

The radio conglomerate ended per a 2 December 1975 ruling that nationalized several commercial radio stations, integrating them into the state-owned RDP network.
