= TP de Oro =

Spanish TV awards

- Awarded for: Excellence in television
- Sponsored by: Teleprograma magazine
- Country: Spain
- First award: 1972
- Final award: 2011

TP de Oro award statue

The TP de Oro were a series of Spanish annual television awards awarded between 1972 and 2011 by Teleprograma magazine.

== History ==
Initially baptized as Los mejores de TP (The best of TP), they were called for the first time in 1972, six years after the birth of Teleprograma magazine. The winners were announced in April 1973, with the great winner of this first edition being the Un, dos, tres... responda otra vez contest, which won three awards: best program, best presenter Kiko Ledgard and most popular character (Don Cicuta).

After the birth of TV3 and ETB Basque, in 1984 the categories were expanded to also recognize the best programs and professionals of regional television. In 1988, a new trophy was released to reward the winners, instead of the commemorative plaque delivered to date.

In 1991 the ceremony was broadcast for the first time on television, by Telecinco. The newly born private networks join the awards distribution, obtaining four Telecinco awards and one Antena 3.

In 1992 the awards changed their name and became the TP de Oro, also launching a new award and new categories. On this occasion the gala was broadcast by Canal + and, a year later, by Televisión Española.

In the 1996 edition, a new bronze statuette - in force until the last edition - was adopted, the work of the sculptor Joaquín Collantes, as a prize for the winners.

For four consecutive years (from 1994 to 1997), Antena 3 was in charge of broadcasting the ceremony and, subsequently, Telecinco did so for three more years (from 1998 to 2000). After the broadcast of TVE in 2001, Antena 3 took over again from 2002 to 2005.

The 2006 awards ceremony, corresponding to TP's 40th anniversary and 50 years of television in Spain, could not be broadcast due to business discrepancies between the magazine and the private channels.

After this parenthesis, in 2007 the newly born La Sexta took over the broadcast of the awards, whose candidacies included the two new national channels: Cuatro and La Sexta.

Since 2010, no network has broadcast the TP de Oro gala. In 2012, they were absorbed by Fotogramas de Plata awards and the gala stopped taking place in 2013.
