= Un, dos, tres... responda otra vez =

- The show's mascot (Ruperta the Pumpkin) and logo.
- Genre: Game show
- Created by: Narciso Ibáñez Serrador
- Directed by: Narciso Ibáñez Serrador
- Presented by: Kiko Ledgard; Mayra Gómez Kemp; Jordi Estadella; Miriam Díaz Aroca; José María Bachs; Luis Roderas
- Country of origin: Spain
- Original language: Spanish
- No. of seasons: 10
- No. of episodes: 411

Production
- Running time: 90 minutes / 120 minutes
- Production company: Televisión Española / Prointel

Original release
- Network: La 1
- Release: 24 April 1972 – 11 June 2004

Un, dos, tres... responda otra vez (transl. One, two, three... respond again), usually shortened as Un, dos, tres..., and named Un, dos, tres... a leer esta vez (transl. One, two, three... reading this time) in its last season, is a Spanish prime-time television game show created by Narciso Ibáñez Serrador that was broadcast on La Primera Cadena of Televisión Española for ten seasons from 1972 to 2004.

It became the most famous game show in the history of television in Spain and it was the first television show format exported outside Spain, with versions aired in Belgium, Germany, the Netherlands, Portugal, and the United Kingdom.

== Structure ==
Narciso (alias Chicho) Ibáñez Serrador created the show as a mixture of different traditional game show formats. It included a quiz show as the first round (called the question round), a physical competition as the second round (called the elimination round), and a luck and psychological game as the third round (called the auction). The show derives its name from these three parts (un, dos, tres means "one, two, three"). Contestants consisted of three couples and each episode had a theme focused on a specific topic, such as the French Revolution or the Far West.

The contestants would be cheered on by a "positive" cast of characters who wanted them to win as much money and prizes as possible; and opposed by a "negative" cast, which wanted contestants to lose. The notion of having people actively rooting against contestants was innovative for Spanish television, something that had never been tried before this show.

The "positive" cast consisted of the host of the show and a team of six to eight beautiful girls who served as the host's assistants, called secretaries. The secretaries usually wore sexy uniforms or costumes that reflected the theme of the episode (for instance, they might dress as cowgirls for an episode about the "Far West"). No matter their costumes, the secretaries usually wore a pair of glasses with large round frames, one of the show's trademarks.

The "negative" cast consisted of characters from a fictional town called Tacañón del Todo (English: Complete Misers). As the name of the town suggests, they were misers and didn't want the contestants to earn any money. They were puritanical and disapproved the secretaries' sexy clothing. They were also pedants and complained about the contestants' lack of knowledge. The most important of these characters were Don Cicuta and Las Tacañonas (English: The Miser Ladies).

=== The question round ===
In the first part of the show, a secretary would hand each couple of contestants a tray full of envelopes in turn. The contestants were to choose one and give it to the host. The envelope contained a multiple-answer question which the host read to the contestants and gave an example (like: "Name some fruits like, for example, an apple."). The couple then, after the host said "Un, dos, tres... responda otra vez" (English: "One, two, three... respond again"), had to obey the inquiry and "respond again", that is, they had to repeat the given example as the first answer, and then give as many answers as they could within a maximum time of 45 seconds.

Contestants had to answer alternately and could not repeat an answer that had already been given before, either by them or their partner. Additionally, the rules encouraged contestants to be as specific as possible (for instance, if a contestant answered a generic "berry" to the above question, it would be valid, but after that they could not mention specific varieties of berries, such as "strawberry" or "blueberry" as it would be counted as a repetition). Additional rules were added for some questions. When a contestant gave a mistaken or repeated answer, a member of the negative cast stopped the clock immediately and the couple's time was over. From the third season, the contestant who did not have the turn to answer could mime to help the other contestant if they got stuck. Contestants were given a certain amount of money for each correct answer. The accountant secretary was in charge of sum and announce the money won in each question.

There were three questions for each couple with an increasing level of difficulty. In the show's first three seasons, couples were given 25 pesetas (15c) for each correct answer for the first question. From the fourth season onward, a slot machine determined the random amount of money for that in every episode. In the second question the couples were given the amount won in the first question for each correct answer. And in the third question the couples were given the amount won in the second question for each correct answer.

When all the questions were done, the couple with the highest amount of money became champions and returned the following episode and the other two couples went on to the second part of the show. In the last episode of every season and in special self-contained episodes with no regular contestants, as Christmas specials with children or charity specials with celebrities, the two couples with the highest amount of money went on to the second part of the show and the couple with the smallest amount of money left the show.

=== The elimination round ===
Elimination round from the episode dedicated to New York, broadcast on 30 September 1983. There was a large structure decorated like the Empire State Building, with King Kong on the background and a steep with a string. On the top of the building there were the female members of the couples, and the male members had to climb the slope to reach the top. The female members would throw liquids to their respective rivals to try and make them slip and make them more difficult to climb. The winner would be the couple whose male member would reach the top first, and if no one managed it on the specified time, the winner would be the one who had reached the highest height.

The elimination round was a physical competition that changed each week according to the episode's theme. For example, contestants might be required to fill wine glasses sitting on a tray and then slide down a slide, and the winner would be the couple with the highest amount of liquid accumulated in a jar, or they might be required to climb structures like buildings, strings or poles faster than their rivals, or they could also have to wear clothes of the opposite sex and walk through a cat walk in front of a jury that would vote the funniest couple. On the tenth season, the elimination round would be replaced by a round of questions about the book of the week and the winners would be the couple with the highest number of correct answers. The winning couple would go on the third part of the show.

==== The consolation game ====
In the first season and also in the first months of the second and third season, the couple losing the elimination round went home only with the amount earned on the question round. This was changed during the second season, when the consolation game was introduced. Up until the fifth season, the consolation game was a board game, usually involving the use of giant dice and a big board, where moving the tab to certain square and answering certain question or performing certain task would give money to the contestants. They could also lose money from the question round if they did not have luck, and usually there was a goal in the game which if reached gave the contestants a jackpot that was increased each week it was not won. All board games were dedicated to the mascot of the show, and home versions of these games were commercially released so that people could play at home. From the last three episodes of the fifth season onward, a change was made in the style of the games. They were no longer typical board games but luck games attached to certain sponsor. These games were more simple in their rules (usually simply choosing some numbers or letters from the sponsor's name), but the potential prizes were drastically increased. In many episodes the couple in the consolation game eventually won a much better prize than the one who had won the elimination round at the end of the Auction.

=== The auction ===
The longest and most well-known part of the show was the auction. The host and the contestants stood next to the audience behind a table from where they saw everything that happened. The auction usually began with the host introducing a theatrical set specifically built in front of the audience according to the theme of the week, where a Broadway-like musical number related to that topic was performed by the secretaries, who sang and performed different choreographed dances. There were also comedic sketches and performances by famous artists next to the table, as well as other surprises. After each performance was finished, an object related to the theme was taken to the table. Each object had a card attached to it, which had a text that could be related to the object or the performance where it came from. The host was allowed to read a part of the text, until they stopped midway with a phrase that became iconic in Spain, "y hasta aquí puedo leer" (English: "and I can read only until this point").

This would continue until there were three objects on the table. As there could not be more than three objects, the contestants had to discard one in order to continue with the game. When an item was discarded, the host would read the complete card, including the text beyond the point where they had stopped earlier, revealing a prize the contestants had passed up. The show went on like that, watching performances, bringing a new object, discarding another one and losing a prize, until the show was over and there were three final objects on the table. At this point, the host could ask the contestants to discard two objects at once, or one by one, and they would keep a final object which would contain the prize they had won. Prizes ranged from cars, apartments, travels, money, jewels... to thousands of matches, used tyres and bottles of laxative (a couple of contestants even ended up winning their own tombs on a cemetery of their choice). The big prize was often an apartment in the Mediterranean holiday town of "Torrevieja, Alicante". The Torreta development where the 50-m^{2} bungalows were located has been degraded decades later.

Some cards could contain more than one prize, some times, a booby prize at the beginning followed by marvelous or even worse prizes. In those cases, the host could let the contestants keep the object after revealing the first booby prize to reject another prize on the table, in the hope that the following unknown prize would be good. An example of a card with this system is this one, from a 1991 episode dedicated to the Stock Exchange, found in a newspaper about the Great Crash:

In a program dedicated to the stock exchange, there could not fail to be a mention to the terrific fall of the American stock exchange in 1929, the famous Great Crash [crack in Spanish] that sank economy in the United States...[end of clue]...The same way there had to be a reference to the Crash of 1929, in "Un, dos, tres", we are also forced to remember that in the past season, one of our mascots had exactly that name, El Crack... and here you've got it!...[pause]... El Crack was the negative mascot in our previous season. But, since in this season the symbol of negativity is monopolized by Ruperta [a pumpkin], this Crack has no more mission than to serve as decoration in... This wonderful apartment!

Sometimes, however, an object's card would contain a gambling game. In those gambling games, the contestants could win different amounts of money or other prizes. The host was usually allowed to reveal when an object had a game attached to it, as long as they did not reveal the rules, which remained secret if the game was discarded, because some unused games were recycled for future programs.

Even when the contestants had the last object on the table, the game was still not over. At that point, the game started that gave this segment its name: the auction. The host would begin to offer money to the contestants in exchange for the prize, raising the amount if the contestants said no, until they reached the top offer. When the host reached the top offer or the contestants decided to accept the money, the prize they had won or lost was revealed.

Any imaginable prize could appear on the show, and no prize was guaranteed to appear at all, except one prize that the rules stated had to appear in at least one of the objects: the show's mascot. There were different mascots through different seasons, normally associated with a booby prize. Sometimes, though, the mascot had extra prizes attached to it, so it was not always bad. There also were some seasons where there was a couple of mascots, one of them good and the other bad. In those seasons, winning the good mascot meant choosing any prize from that episode, and winning the bad mascot meant going home only with a doll of the mascot. When there were a good and a bad mascot on the same season, only the presence of one of them was forced, and the contestants wouldn't know which one of them was going to appear on the show. Sometimes, though, both could appear on the same episode, and they could even appear as prizes inside a game.

There was one basic rule for the host. The contestants could make all the questions they wanted, and the host was not allowed to say a single falsehood. They could refuse to answer, and also could not say the whole truth, that is, they could omit context or hide some valuable data, but everything they said had to be true. For example, the host could explain a gambling game like this:

You have a lottery hype full of balls. You have to choose eight numbers from 1 to 12, and then you can extract up to 6 balls. The first extracted number that coincides with a number you chose earlier will be rewarded with 250,000 pesetas, and the following hits will each one multiply by 2 the money, meaning that you can win up to 8 million pesetas. But if the ball with the number 13 gets out, you will lose all your money. You can stop whenever you want.

And the contestants would indeed stop before getting their 6 numbers from the hype, in fear of getting the ball 13 as the chances were increasing. But then, when the game was over, the host would reveal that, certainly, the contestants would have lost if the ball 13 had come out... but there was no ball 13 in the hype.

== Mascots ==
=== Ruperta, the Pumpkin (1976–1983, 1991–2004) ===
The first season featured no mascot as such, but the worst prize was usually symbolized by a pumpkin (in Spanish, the expression "dar calabazas", "to give pumpkins", is used as equivalent of turning someone down romantically or giving someone a fail in an exam). Inspired on this for the second season, José Luis Moro drew and Narciso Ibáñez Serrador voiced an anthropomorphic cartoon pumpkin named Ruperta that sang every week the show's main theme song in the title sequence. Its presence was mandatory in the auction and, even though it usually was the worst prize of the evening (just taking the pumpkin home), sometimes it hid other prizes, which could be equally bad or huge. For example, the biggest prize ever won in the history of the show was hidden in Ruperta: a car, an apartment in Xàbia, a yacht, and a check worth 5 million pesetas (€30,000). Ruperta bid farewell on May 13, 1983, halfway the third season, came back in the seventh season and lasted until the end of tenth season.

=== Botilde, the Boot (1983–1984) ===
A week after Ruperta's farewell halfway through the third season, viewers were introduced to Botilde, an old purple boot playing on the old joke about fishermen who only got a boot while fishing. Its main difference with Ruperta was that Botilde was usually not physically brought to the auction table. She usually appeared in an animatronic version that would talk to the hostess and the contestants, voiced by Narciso Ibáñez Serrador. Botilde only lasted until the end of the third season.

=== El Chollo and El Antichollo (1984–1986) ===
El Chollo (English: The Bargain) was a pink, pear-shaped creature who wore a top hat, leg warmers, a cape, and a cane. Its animated version was often seen smoking cigars and with a cheerful smile. Unlike Ruperta and Botilde, Chollo was a symbol of the best prize, as getting it on the auction gave contestants the possibility of choosing any other prize that had appeared that evening. However, the idea of a positive mascot did not sit well with the viewers, so a negative counterpart was soon introduced in the form of Chollo's 'evil twin', El Antichollo. It was green and sported a black cape and a sinister grin with vampire fangs. He was described as a transformation of Chollo when Chollo got angry, compared with Dr. Jekyll and Mr. Hyde or the Gremlins. Getting it in the auction meant going home empty-handed. Every week during the auction, one of them would appear (sometimes even both). They appeared on the show in the fourth and fifth season.

=== El Boom and El Crack (1987–1988) ===
These were the shortest-serving mascots of the show, appearing only in the sixth season. Boom was an orange-yellow, pink-haired, frog-like creature who wore a brown tuxedo, boater hat and a cane. It always sported a wide, happy smile, and moved vigorously and cheerfully. For its part, Crack was a tall, greenish creature resembling a lizard, with barely four locks of hair. It wore a torn, dark-red tuxedo and hat, always looked sad, and showed a great clumsiness. Their function in the auction was identical to Chollo and Antichollo before them: Boom gave the contestants the possibility of winning whichever prize they chose, while Crack meant leaving empty-handed.

In their introduction, they were described as two tramps who played their last coins in a slot machine. Boom won the jackpot, while Crack lost its coin. As a result of this, unlike Chollo and Antichollo, they being positive and negative was not a matter of good or evil; simply, Boom always has and brings good luck and Crack always has and brings bad luck.

== History ==
=== Season 1 (April 24, 1972 – April 30, 1973) ===
Un, dos, tres... responda otra vez
- Season 1
- No. of episodes: 54

Release
- Original release: April 24, 1972 – April 30, 1973

Un, dos, tres... responda otra vez premiered on April 24, 1972, hosted by Kiko Ledgard. This first season, which was aired on Monday evenings, lasted a full year and was the only one broadcast in black and white; Televisión Española began broadcasting in colour one year later. Narciso Ibáñez Serrador, who had achieved some acclaim with horror shows, decided, under advice from his father Narciso Ibáñez Menta, to remove his name from the credits during the first 15 episodes, fearing that his reputation would be ruined by being associated with a game show. But when the show became a success, he started listing his name. These first 15 episodes were also not dedicated to any specific theme. The first episode dedicated to a specific topic was the 16th episode and it was dedicated to "Bullfighting". In this season there were four couples of contestants instead of three. The booby prize was symbolized by a pumpkin. The negative cast were Don Cicuta and his silent Cicutillas from Tacañón del Todo.

==== Cast ====
Positive Cast
Host

- Kiko Ledgard

Secretaries

- Ana Ángeles García (accountant secretary)
- Maria Gustafson "Britt"
- Ágata Lys
- Pilar Pérez
- Yolanda Ríos
- Marisa Hernández "Maxia"
- Cira Rodríguez
- María Salerno (as Marta Monterrey)
- Aurora Claramunt
- Blanca Aguete (as Silvana Sandoval)
- Blanca Estrada

Negative Cast

- Don Cicuta: Valentín Tornos
- Arnaldo Cicutilla: Javier Pajares
- Remigio Cicutilla: Ignacio Pérez

=== Season 2 (March 19, 1976 – January 27, 1978) ===
Un, dos, tres... responda otra vez
- Season 2
- No. of episodes: 83

Release
- Original release: March 19, 1976 – January 27, 1978

After the end of the first season in 1973, there was a gap of three years while Chicho, among other projects, was filming his second and last feature film, Who Can Kill a Child?. After filming ended, he started a new season of the show. The second season was the first recorded and broadcast in colour. Also it was the first season to be broadcast on Fridays, a tradition that continued until the show went off the air (with the exception of the sixth season).

For this season, the secretaries were replaced with new actresses wearing sexier uniforms – this was possible because censorship had been eased and it was no longer necessary to measure the length of the girls' dresses, as had been done in the first season. The leader of these secretaries was a 16-year-old Victoria Abril, who later became an international actress.

In the first episode, Don Cicuta bid farewell to the audience (Valentin Tornos was already very ill and would eventually die months later) and new characters took over his role. These new characters, named Tacañones (English: Misers), would not reach the same success Don Cicuta had. They were Professor Lápiz, Don Rácano and Don Estrecho. Each of them had a part of Don Cicuta's personality. The first one would be the pedant character, the second one would be the miser character and the third one would be the puritan character. Don Rácano and Don Estrecho were later replaced by Don Justo Rajatabla and Don Menudillo in similar roles.

This season introduced the show's mascot character. In the previous season there was a pumpkin to symbolize the worst prize the show awarded. The pumpkin became a cartoon who sang the main theme song each week in the title sequence. This singing pumpkin was named Ruperta, and after Don Cicuta's disappearance, it became the most famous trademark in the history of the show, staying for years.

Until summer of 1977, there were still four couples of contestants. It was in September, 1977 when the number was downed to three couples. The consolation game after the elimination round was introduced in this season.

==== Cast ====
Positive Cast
Host

- Kiko Ledgard

Secretaries

- Victoria Abril (accountant secretary)
- María Casal
- María Durán
- Beatriz Escudero
- Raquel Torrent
- Meggy Schmidt
- Marián Flores
- Mª Teresa Villar
- Úrsula Grin
- Marta del Pino
- María Escudero
- Isabel Escudero
- Ivonne Gil
- Cristina Brodín
- Pilar Medina
- Silvia Aguilar
- June English
- Luisa Fernanda
- Patricia Solís

Negative Cast

- Professor Lápiz: Pedro Sempson
- Don Rácano: Francisco Cecilio
- Don Estrecho: Juan Tamariz
- Don Justo Rajatabla: Blaki
- Don Menudillo: Luis Lorenzo

Supporting Cast

- Pepe Carabias
- Bigote Arrocet
- Luis Barbero
- Paloma Hurtado
- Rafaela Aparicio
- Mayra Gómez Kemp
- Nené Morales
- Andrés Pajares

==== Consolation game ====
- La Ruperta Fantasma (English: The Ghost Ruperta): It followed the rules of Battleship. There was a grid with lines and columns identified by letters and numbers. The contestants had to choose a square from the grid. It could contain a "slip", a "sneak pumpkin" or the "Ghost Ruperta". Getting in a "slip" gave the contestants a question. If they answered correctly they gained 1,000 pesetas and went on playing, if they failed, the game was over. The "sneak pumpkin" opened all the spots around the sneak. There was a jackpot starting in 25,000 pesetas that was increased 25,000 more each week if it was not won. The "Ghost Ruperta" made the contestants the winners of the jackpot, whatever it was. There was only a single Ghost Ruperta on the whole grid, and the grid was not changed until it was discovered.
- El juego de la Pera (English: The Pear Game): Differently to other mascot games, it featured an unofficial mascot, a smiling unnamed pear. The game followed the rules of the Snakes and Ladders game. There was a jackpot similar to the previous one which would be to the contestants who reached the goal in the game.

=== Season 3 (August 20, 1982 – April 13, 1984) ===
Un, dos, tres... responda otra vez
- Season 3
- No. of episodes: 81

Release
- Original release: August 20, 1982 – April 13, 1984

There was a four-year gap between the end of the second season and the beginning of the third. In 1980, the show's host, Kiko Ledgard, had a near-lethal accident, and though he survived, the brain damage he sustained spelled the end of his entertainment career. Mayra Gómez Kemp, who had already worked on the show the previous season as a comedian actress, replaced him.

Since a woman was the host and was joined by new girls as secretaries, Chicho decided that the negative cast should also include only women. He hired Las hermanas Hurtado, a trio of comic actresses, who became Las Tacañonas. La Viuda de Poco was the miser character, Inmaculada (alias La Seño) was the pedant character and María de la Purificación (alias Mari Puri) was the puritan character. They were so successful in their parts that they stayed in the show until ninth season, longer than any other actor in the show.

In the middle of the season, there was a major revamp in the show. On May 13, 1983, the show announced that it would replace all of the secretaries with new actresses who were able to dance choreographed pieces. The following week, a new mascot, Botilde the boot, replaced Ruperta, a new title sequence with a new main theme song was released and the new secretaries also came on board. They danced songs from musicals like Fame and A Chorus Line.

Also, a new type of contestants was introduced, the suffering contestants. They were a couple, just like the others, but with a very different purpose. In the first episodes they were sat in the public's front row and in later episodes they were locked in a separated room decorated like a dungeon, and there they would watch the auction from a screen, while the secretaries gave them information written in signboards about where the best prizes were hiding (sometimes, subtitles on screen informed the viewers about what the suffering contestants were reading). At the end of the auction, the suffering contestants would earn exactly the same prize the contestants earned, and they had to see some of the best prizes go unclaimed without being able to do anything about it. The suffering contestants would be present on the show until the eighth season.

==== Cast ====
Positive Cast
Hostess

- Mayra Gómez Kemp

Secretaries Part 1

- Patricia Solís (accountant secretary)
- Irene Foster
- Alejandra Grepi
- Françoise Lacroix
- Rosalía Turnero
- Kim Marías
- Concha Lobón

Secretaries Part 2

- Silvia Marsó (accountant secretary)
- Kim Manning
- Gloria Fernández
- Frances Ondiviela (as Pat Ondiviela)
- Maite de Castro
- Ivanka Marfil

Negative Cast

- La Viuda de Poco: Paloma Hurtado
- Inmaculada (alias La Seño): Teresa Hurtado
- María de la Purificación (alias Mari Puri): Fernanda Hurtado

Supporting Cast

- Martes y Trece
- Beatriz Carvajal
- Raúl Sénder
- Bigote Arrocet
- Pepe Carabias
- Luis Lorenzo
- Luisa Armenteros
- Arévalo
- Fedra Lorente
- Gabriela Acher

==== Consolation game ====
- El juego de Botilde (English: Botilde Game): It was starring Botilde, the Boot, and it was based on the Game of the Goose. The contestants had to bet all the money earned in the question round and they could increase or decrease it. The contestants had two giant dice, a traditional one from one to six and a special one which had four faces of Botilde, a "x2" or a "-". Each contestant threw one die. The numbered one marked how many squares the piece advanced. In the other die, if there appeared a Botilde, nothing happened, getting a "x2" meant advancing double length, and getting a "-" meant going backwards. There were some squares in the board with Botilde on them, falling in one made the piece jump to the next Botilde. The rest of the squares had a different effect each one, some were positive, and some were negative, even involving automatic end of the game. Others had a question or a task to be performed, and failing meant the end of the game too. When the game was finished if it had not reached the goal, the piece was left on the spot it had finally landed and the contestants the following week would start from that square, unless specified otherwise. As in previous games, there was a jackpot that would be won by the couple reaching the goal.

=== Seasons 4 (November 9, 1984 – May 3, 1985) ===
Un, dos, tres... responda otra vez
- Season 4
- No. of episodes: 26

Release
- Original release: November 9, 1984 – May 3, 1985

The fourth season would begin a few months after the end of the previous season. From this point on, a season would last only a few months, instead of years as had previously been the case. For the first time, some secretaries from the previous season were carried over into the new season.

Botilde was replaced by a positive mascot, El Chollo. It was a symbol of the show's best prize: choosing any prize appearing in the auction. With the new mascot, a new title sequence and a new main theme song were also released. The negative cast was also replaced by a new character, called Eugenia Enchufols Deltot, who was an old whiner secretary with no relation with Tacañón del Todo. But viewers missed the old negative cast and a negative mascot so, after only five episodes, that new character left the show and Las Hurtado Sisters reprised their roles as Las Tacañonas bringing with them a new negative mascot, El Antichollo.

Some changes were introduced in the rules of the question round. For the first time a random amount thrown by a slot machine would be given for each correct answer to the first question. The first question would be exactly the same question for the three couples, and it would be based on the theme of the week. Couples would be introduced in the studio one by one, being locked away so that they could not hear the first question and answer in advantage. The second question would be a regular question like in previous seasons, and for the third question a new system was presented. Instead of a regular question, the host would read a statement, and then words that needed a match to be given, for example, if the statement was "Books and authors", the host said "Don Quixote", and the contestants had to say "Cervantes", then the host said "Romeo and Juliet", and the contestants had to say "Shakespeare", and so on, until the contestants gave a wrong answer or the usual 45 seconds were over. This type of question was introduced from the British adaptation of the show.

In this season, the secretaries started singing as well as dancing in the musical numbers. From this season until the final one, music from established songs from Broadway or movie musicals, as well as from pop hits were given new lyrics in Spanish adapted to the week's topic. Some examples of songs from the fourth season include "The Continental" and "That's Entertainment!".

After the suffering contestants had been introduced the previous season, this season introduced the "suffering contestant at home". Before each episode, a notary randomly assigned a number to each of the prizes appearing on it, writing them to a list, and then selected a letter similar to the ones sent by suffering contestants at the studio. The difference was that in this letter, they had to include a number within a circle as well as their phone number. Moments before the end of the auction, when there were the three final objects on the table, a secretary would bring the selected letter and a telephone to the host, and the host would phone the suffering contestant at home while the auction contestants and the public had to be quiet. The number in the circle from the letter would point to the number the notary assigned to one of the prizes of the list, and this prize would be automatically won by the suffering contestant at home. The host would announce the prize if it had already been lost by the contestants, but if it still was on the table, they asked the suffering contestant to watch the end of the show, until the prize was revealed when the contestants lost or won it. The suffering contestant at home figure would last until sixth season.

==== Cast ====
Positive Cast
Hostess

- Mayra Gómez Kemp

Secretaries

- Lydia Bosch (accountant secretary)
- Kim Manning
- Gloria Fernández
- Naomi Unwin
- Mari Luz Lence

Negative Cast

- Eugenia Enchufols Deltot: Eugenia Roca
- La Viuda de Poco: Paloma Hurtado
- La Seño: Teresa Hurtado
- Mari Puri: Fernanda Hurtado

Supporting Cast

- Beatriz Carvajal
- Raúl Sénder
- Bigote Arrocet
- Arévalo
- Fedra Lorente
- Antonio Ozores
- Hermanos Calatrava

==== Consolation game ====
- La carrera del Chollo (English: The Chollo Race): It was also based on the Game of the Goose, including two innovations. There were two pieces, one for the contestants and the other one for a member of the audience chosen previously, and instead of dices, the contestants played with cards, which had numbers from one to six. Now the jackpot was increased 50,000 pesetas each week. If the winner was the member of the public, they gained a half of the jackpot. If the contestants were the winners, they gained the whole jackpot.

=== Seasons 5 (October 4, 1985 – March 28, 1986) ===
Un, dos, tres... responda otra vez
- Season 5
- No. of episodes: 26

Release
- Original release: October 4, 1985 – March 28, 1986

The fifth season was a continuation of the fourth. The only major changes were introducing the first ever non white secretary, Nuria Carreras, from Equatorial Guinea, and recovering the ordinary first question in the question round. For the first time, Chicho announced with great fanfare that this season would be the show's last, a tradition that went on at the end of each season afterwards. On this season, he would bury a coffin with elements and attrezzo of the show inside; a gloomy scene that became a classic on Spanish television.

==== Cast ====
Positive Cast
Hostess

- Mayra Gómez Kemp

Secretaries

- Lydia Bosch (accountant secretary)
- Kim Manning
- Gloria Fernández
- Naomi Unwin
- Nuria Carreras

Negative Cast

- La Viuda de Poco: Paloma Hurtado
- La Seño: Teresa Hurtado
- Mari Puri: Fernanda Hurtado

Supporting Cast

- Beatriz Carvajal
- Raúl Sénder
- Arévalo
- Fedra Lorente
- Antonio Ozores
- Juanito Navarro

==== Consolation game ====
- El país del Antichollo (English: The Land of Antichollo): Each contestant had a dice of his own. They had to cross the board from the right corner to the left one, and there was the Antichollo moving around the board. The spots were numbered from two to twelve, and each movement made the contestants answer a question or perform a task. Winning gave money to the contestants, and losing meant also losing money. If they failed for a third time, counting the fails of both members of the couple, both were disqualified. When both contestants had played, they had to throw both dices in the name of the Antichollo. If at the number given by the dices there was a piece from one of the players, that player was disqualified and his piece removed from the board. Each piece that reached the goal meant winning a half of the jackpot.
- Juego de Cepsa (English: The Cepsa Game): The five letters of the name of the sponsor Cepsa were hidden behind five boards. The contestants had to realign the boards as they chose and then the letters were discovered. If the word C-E-P-S-A was read, the contestants earned ten million pesetas. If not, they gained 100,000 pesetas for each letter in the right place.

=== Season 6 (April 6, 1987 – January 8, 1988) ===
Un, dos, tres... responda otra vez
- Season 6
- No. of episodes: 35

Release
- Original release: April 6, 1987 – January 8, 1988

Even though the show was supposed to be over, Chicho was asked to do another season. New mascots were introduced for this season, El Boom and El Crack, with identical functions as their predecessors, El Chollo and El Antichollo. With the new mascots, a new title sequence and a new main theme song were also released. Only for this season the show returned to Mondays, and it achieved the highest ratings ever with nearly 25 million viewers, more than half of the population in Spain.

In this season, the rules of the question round were brought back to the original ones from seasons one to three, only with the difference of letting the contestants choose on the third question a specific topic among four, which were "Art & Literature", "Geography & History", "Sports, Games & Entertainment", and "Science & Nature", and the envelopes would be in four piles so that they could choose the envelope from the preferred topic. This was removed the following season to recover the original increasing difficulty three questions.

During this season, international stars started appearing on the show, including the Swedish rock group Europe, the British singer Samantha Fox and the Italian singer Sabrina Salerno.

Again, it was announced that this season would be the show's last.

==== Cast ====
Positive Cast
Hostess

- Mayra Gómez Kemp

Secretaries

- Silvia Marsó (accountant secretary)
- Kim Manning (accountant secretary after Silvia's departure)
- Victoria Vivas
- Isabel Serrano
- Jenny Hill
- Beverly Owen
- Nina
- Gloria Fernández
- Esther del Prado
- Ana Fernández

Negative Cast

- La Viuda de Poco: Paloma Hurtado
- La Seño: Teresa Hurtado
- Mari Puri: Fernanda Hurtado

Supporting Cast

- Beatriz Carvajal
- Raúl Sénder
- Arévalo
- Antonio Ozores
- Juanito Navarro
- Dúo Sacapuntas
- Bigote Arrocet
- Manolo Royo

==== Consolation game ====
- Juego de Cepsa: The same as in previous season, the five letters of the name of the sponsor Cepsa were hidden under five boards. The contestants had to realign the boards as they chose and then the letters were discovered. If the word C-E-P-S-A was read, the contestants earned ten million pesetas. If not, they gained 100,000 pesetas for each letter in the right place.
- Raspadita Competición Málaga (English: The Málaga Scratching Competition): The sponsor was SEAT. There was a board with a road divided into rows, each with two or three scratch dots. A contestant was playing against a member of the public chosen by a draw, one with the color red and the other with the color blue. The player in turn had to choose a dot and scratch it. Behind the scratch dots there were color dots, in red, blue and white. If the dot discovered was their color, they went on, if it was the opponent's color or white, they lost the turn. If it was white, the following player had to scratch on the same row to find his color. Otherwise, they played on the following row. Each player was allowed to fail twice and was disqualified on the third mistake. If one of the players reached the goal row and there they scratched and found their color, the prize was a brand new car, a Seat Málaga. If in the goal the player scratched the opponent's color, the car was for the opponent, even if disqualified. If at the goal they scratched the white spot, nobody got the prize.
- El uno de Galerías (English: The number one by Galerías): The sponsor was the disappeared department store Galerías Preciados. The letters of the word G-A-L-E-R-I-A-S had to be realigned by the contestants the way they wanted. Behind the letters there was a number one and seven zeros. When the letters were aligned, the numbers were discovered and the contestants would win the amount that could be read, which ranged from one peseta (if the result was 000000001) to 10,000,000 pesetas.
- Juego de Avecrem (English: The Avecrem Game): The sponsor was Avecrem Gallina Blanca. There were seven red hens numbered from 1 to 7 and the contestants had to choose three numbers. Behind three of the numbers there were three white hens and the rest were red. If the contestants found the three white hens, they earned 10 million pesetas, if they found two, they got half a million, and if only one, one hundred thousand.
- Juego de Cepsa Multigrado (English: The Cepsa Multigrado Game): There were ten cans with the old design of the sponsor in white, each attached to a letter of the word M-U-L-T-I-G-R-A-D-O. They had to choose four letters. Behind the cans there could be another can with the old design or a can with the new design in black. There were four new cans. If they found the four of them, they earned 10 million pesetas, if they got three, they got a million, if two, half a million, and if one, one hundred thousand.

=== Season 7 (September 13, 1991 – April 10, 1992) ===
Un, dos, tres... responda otra vez
- Season 7
- No. of episodes: 31

Release
- Original release: September 13, 1991 – April 10, 1992

After four years, Chicho was asked again to resurrect the show, and he agreed. He brought back Ruperta the pumpkin as the mascot of the show and a new title sequence with a rearranged version of Ruperta's old main theme song was released. Las Hurtado sisters also returned as the negative cast, but with new characters called Las Derrochonas (English: The Squander Girls), nieces of the characters from the previous seasons.

The new hosts were Jordi Estadella and Miriam Díaz Aroca. Jordi would host the question round and the auction, and Miriam would be the accountant in the question round, host the elimination round and the consolation game, and sing and dance with the secretaries in the auction.

The secretaries recovered their trademark glasses lost in 1983, but they still performed Broadway-like musical numbers. Thanks to much bigger budgets driven by much more interest from advertisers, these musical numbers were performed in large lavish theatrical sets with the accompaniment of large numbers of dancers and extras when needed. Prizes were also increased, with the base money being ten times bigger than in previous seasons.

The season finale was a special feature dedicated to the show's 20th anniversary, lasting three and a half hours and featuring actors and actresses from all previous seasons.

==== Cast ====
Positive Cast
Hosts

- Jordi Estadella
- Miriam Díaz Aroca (hostess/accountant)

Secretaries

- María Abradelo
- Marta de Pablo
- Carolina Rodríguez
- Patricia Alcocer
- Elsa Berardengo
- Belén Ledesma
- Tiffany Smith
- Patricia López
- Margarita Hervás

Negative Cast

- Paloma Hurtado
- Teresa Hurtado
- Fernanda Hurtado

Supporting Cast

- Ángel Garó
- Arévalo
- Guix y Murga
- Antonio Morales
- Emma Ozores
- Manolo Royo

==== Consolation game ====
- Juego de Vidal Sassoon - versión 1 (English: The Vidal Sassoon Game): The sponsor was Vidal Sassoon Wash & Go. Behind the letters of the word V-I-D-A-L-S-A-S-S-O-O-N there could be bottles of the sponsor, bottles of ordinary shampoo, and bottles of hair conditioner. The contestants were playing in team with someone at home who had sent a letter with a label of any of the products from the Sponsor. In the letter, that person signaled three letters, and the contestants had to read them to discover what was behind them. If it was a Vidal Sassoon product, they earned 250,000 pesetas. If it was shampoo, 50,000 pesetas, and if hair conditioner, 25,000 pesetas. Finished this part, one of the contestants could exchange 250,000 pesetas to push a button which would start a roulette with the words of the slogan rolling. If when the roulette stopped, the slogan "Lavar y listo" ("Wash & Go") could be read, they would earn 5 million pesetas. They had one try for each 250,000 pesetas they had earned previously, and they got 5 million for each time they got the slogan. At the end, the final prize, a maximum of 15 million pesetas, was shared between the contestants and the viewer at home.
- Juego de Vidal Sassoon - versión 2: Under the letters of the word V-I-D-A-L-S-A-S-S-O-O-N there were four bottles of the sponsor, bottles of shampoo or hair conditioner, and there was a spot with a bad pumpkin named Ruperta Malos Pelos (Bad Haired Ruperta). A viewer at home also sent a letter with a label from the sponsor, and chose three letters, which would be opened first, and then the contestants, if they wanted to take the risk, could choose a fourth letter. If after the four letters were discovered, they found the four bottles of the sponsor, they earned 10 million pesetas. If they found three, they got 5 million pesetas. If two, 2.5 million, and if one, one million. If they found the bad pumpkin, they lost everything they had earned before it appeared, and started from zero with the rest of the letters. If they found a bottle of shampoo or hair conditioner, they got 100,000 pesetas, but if they found one shampoo and one hair conditioner, they counted together as a bottle of the sponsor. As in the previous version, the prize was shared between the contestants and the viewer at home.
- Profiden: The contestants were given eight definitions, and they had to answer with a word starting with a letter, in order, from the word P-R-O-F-I-D-E-N winning money for each correct answer up to more than 12 million pesetas.

=== Season 8 (October 2, 1992 – July 9, 1993) ===
Un, dos, tres... responda otra vez
- Season 8
- No. of episodes: 38

Release
- Original release: October 2, 1992 – July 9, 1993

The eighth season was a continuation of the seventh. The same hosts and many of the secretaries returned. Las Hurtado sisters also returned as Las Derrochonas, but in 1993, with an economic crisis gripping the country, they changed their name back to Las Tacañonas.

In this season, with the expansion of private channels, viewing figures slowly started declining.

==== Cast ====
Positive Cast
Hosts

- Jordi Estadella
- Miriam Díaz Aroca (hostess/accountant)

Secretaries

- María Abradelo
- Marta de Pablo
- Carolina Rodríguez
- Mayte Navarrete
- Lucy Lovick
- Alejandra Cano
- Tiffany Smith
- Laura Yamaguchi
- Nieves Aparicio
- Gemma Balbás
- Patricia Rivas

Negative Cast

- Paloma Hurtado
- Teresa Hurtado
- Fernanda Hurtado

Supporting Cast

- Raúl Sénder
- Arévalo
- Fedra Lorente
- Manolo Royo
- Académica Palanca
- Gonzalo Bargalló
- Anthony Blake
- Gloria Trevi

==== Consolation game ====
- Ariel: The sponsor was Ariel. The rules were similar to the previous consolation game, but now with the letters U-L-T-R-A-C-O-L-O-R. The prize was shared with someone at home who had sent a barcode from the sponsor.
- La ducha de los millones Litamin (English: A shower of millions by Litamin): Each player had to choose a bottle with a question that they read to their partner. If the partner answered, they had to read his own question which also had to be answered back. If both questions were answered correctly, that was a hit. Each hit gave them one million pesetas. They could pass the question, in which case another bottle with a question had to be chosen and answered correctly to get the hit. If they gave a wrong answer, they would lose one million pesetas. The final prize was shared with someone at home who had sent a barcode from the sponsor.
- La panadería Panrico (English: The Panrico Bakery): The sponsor was Panrico. This game was developed week after week. A team was formed with the couple, a viewer at home who sent a barcode and a retailer who included their data in the letter if the viewer at home and retailer decided to do so. Just for playing, each of them, contestants, viewer and retailer, got 100,000 pesetas. For 90 seconds, the contestants had to choose questions contained in products from the sponsor which the host read to them. Each correct answer gave them 25 or 50 points. When one minute had passed, they could choose to answer the "star question" which would give them 200 points if correctly answered or stop the game if failed. At the end of the season, the team with the highest number of points earned a total of 30 million pesetas: 14 million for the contestants, 14 million for the viewer at home and 2 million for the retailer, if any.

=== Season 9 (November 19, 1993 – April 8, 1994) ===
Un, dos, tres... responda otra vez
- Season 9
- No. of episodes: 18

Release
- Original release: November 19, 1993 – April 8, 1994

The ninth season started a few months later. A new host, José María Bachs, replaced Jordi and Miriam. One of Las Hurtado Sisters, Paloma, could not join the negative cast on the first months because she had been accidentally shot in the face weeks before the launch of the season and was recovering from the surgery. She was replaced by two actresses, Merce Comes and Vicky Plana, who joined the remaining Hurtado sisters, until Paloma returned in January, 1994, with great fanfare and the applause of all the public and members of the cast.

A major change was made on the rules. There would be only two questions instead of three, with a much higher base money for them. Also, in this season there were no champions, and the winners of the question round would be granted the right to buy their presence in the auction with the money they had earned. In the elimination round, the other two couples would compete to get to the consolation game, where they could increase the money won in the question round. At the end of the auction, the only offer the host would give was to give back the contestants the money earned in the question round in exchange of the final prize. All these changes would only last for this season.

The last episode was dedicated to "The big boom" and the sets were all symbolically blown up, putting a definitive end to the show. With the audience rating falling down this end was considered final.

==== Cast ====
Positive Cast
Host

- José María Bachs

Secretaries

- Mayte Navarrete (accountant secretary)
- Diana Lázaro (accountant secretary)
- Carolina Rodríguez
- Alejandra Cano
- Lucy Lovick
- Nieves Aparicio
- Paula Vázquez

Negative Cast

- Paloma Hurtado
- Teresa Hurtado
- Fernanda Hurtado
- Tía Virtudes: Mercé Comes
- Tía Mª de la Purificación: Vicky Plana

Supporting Cast

- Pepe Viyuela
- Luisa Martín
- Silvia Abascal
- Lázaro Escarceller
- Natalie Pinot
- Joan Domínguez
- Jacqueline Arenal

==== Consolation game ====
- La casa de Ocaso (English: The Ocaso House): The sponsor was Seguros Ocaso. The contestants had to choose a window or door from a small house. Opening it revealed a multiplication, from x1 to x10 which would be applied to the money they had got in the question round.

=== Season 10 (January 9, 2004 – June 11, 2004) ===
Un, dos, tres... responda otra vez
- Season 10
- No. of episodes: 19

Release
- Original release: January 9 – June 11, 2004

After more than a decade in hiatus, the show was again resurrected in 2004, but featuring big changes, including all new sets and better sceneries. A new team of young secretaries and a new host, Luis Roderas, appeared in this season. Ruperta the pumpkin continued as the mascot of the show and its theme song was updated with new lyrics. But the biggest change was the title, which was changed to Un, dos, tres... a leer esta vez (transl. One, two, three... reading this time). This was done because each episode's theme was changed to correspond to a book. The intent was to encourage viewers to read more; contestants had to read the book that was their episode's theme in order to be able to answer questions properly. The elimination round was no longer a physical game, but a new question round, with more questions about the book. The musical numbers and sets were all dedicated to the book as well, and in the auction, on the first two programs, each object had a question about the book that had to be answered to keep the object on the table, or dismiss it if they failed.

A collection of the books that appeared on the show was launched. People had to buy the books, where they could find a booklet with information about the book, the author and the time it was written, and a coupon to participate in the show, either as regular contestants, or by telephone if their letter was selected. On each episode, the host telephoned two people, asked them a question about the book and gave them 15 seconds to answer, to win 500 euros if they hit, an amount rose to 1,000 euros in subsequent programs when difficulty of the questions was heavily increased (on the first programs, all the answers were in the booklet, but when the prize was rose, to really encourage people to read, only by actually reading the book people could find the answer).

A new negative cast, that was not related with Tacañón del Todo, was introduced. These new negative characters were the "Brigade 451", a group of firemen who were against reading, and they were inspired on the firemen who burned books in Ray Bradbury's novel Fahrenheit 451. As the first brigade was not well accepted by the audience it was soon replaced by a second brigade that proved to be more successful.

This season marked the first time that couples of contestants could comprise two men or two women. In the past seasons, only couples consisting of a man and a woman were allowed.

The season started with ratings of nearly 40 percent, but by the end of the season they were down to 16 percent. For the first time ever, the show was canceled before its final episode. So far, despite occasional rumours of a revival, this has proven to be the show's last season.

==== Cast ====
Positive Cast
Host

- Luis Roderas

Secretaries

- Laura de la Calle (accountant secretary in Euros)
- Yolanda Aracil (accountant secretary in pesetas)
- Gloria Mezcúa
- Raquel Oliván
- Victoria Ampudia
- Nieves Aparicio
- Marta García
- Esther Sánchez
- Madga Aizpurua

Negative Cast
Brigade 1

- Colonel McPhantom: Miguel Mugni
- Sergeant Kowalski: Esteban Allares / Rubén Espino

Brigade 2

- General Antilivroff: Alberto Papa-Fragomen
- Dimitri: Roberto Mosca

Supporting Cast

- Pepe Viyuela
- Manolo Sarria
- Rosario Pardo
- Enrique San Francisco
- Llum Barrera
- Eduardo Aldán
- Víctor Carretero

==== Consolation game ====
- El juego de Corn Flakes (English: The Corn Flakes Game): The sponsor was Kellogg's. The letters C-O-R-N-F-L-A-K-E-S had the same letters behind them in the colors red or green. The players had to guess the color of each letter. For the first hit they earned 20 euros, and the following hits would duplicate the amount. If they got all the letters, they would sum 10,240 euros, but they would be given a bonus of 1,760 euros for getting all the letters right, so they would win 12,000 euros.
- El tazón de Corn Flakes (English: The Bowl of Corn Flakes): It was a physical competition were the players had to find the letters of the word "CORN FLAKES" inside a giant bowl filled with "milk", with each letter repeated three times. They had to find the different letters, get out of the bowl and, after sliding down a slide and going through a slippery path, place the letter in its spot. They could only take out of the bowl one letter each time, and there could only be one of the contestants in the bowl at a time; meanwhile the other one had to put his letter in position, if carrying any, and then wait until his partner got out of the bowl to get in. There was a time of three minutes. At the end, they got 500 euros for each letter in the spot, and if all the letters were in, the amount was multiplied by three making a maximum of 15,000 euros.
- El tazón de Puleva Max (English: The Bowl of Puleva Max): The sponsor was Puleva. The game was identical to the previous one, only the letters changed, they were M-A-S-E-N-E-R-G-I-A. Now each letter gave them 300 euros and getting all of them multiplied the amount by two, making a total of 6,000 euros.

== International versions ==
| Country | Name | Host(s) | TV station | Year aired |
|---|---|---|---|---|
| Belgium (Flanders) | 1-2-3 show | Walter Capiau and Anne De Baetzelier | VTM | 1994 |
| Germany | Die verflixte 7 | Rudi Carell | Das Erste | 1984–87 |
| Netherlands | 1-2-3-show | Rudi Carell; Ted de Braak | KRO | 1983–86 |
| Portugal | Um, dois, três | Carlos Cruz; António Sala; Teresa Guilherme | RTP1 | 1984–86, 1990; 1994–95; 2004–05 |
| United Kingdom | 3-2-1 | Ted Rogers | ITV | 1978–88 |
