= Kiko Ledgard =

Peruvian television presenter (1918–1995)

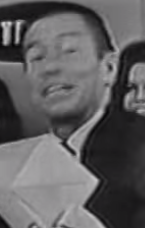
- Ledgard in 1967.
- Born: Enrique Rodolfo Ledgard Jiménez; 23 November 1918; Lima, Peru
- Died: 23 October 1995 (aged 76); Madrid, Spain
- Occupation(s): Television presenter Actor
- Years active: 1959-1981
- Television: Haga negocio con Kiko; Un, dos, tres... responda otra vez (1972–1978)

Enrique Rodolfo Ledgard (Note: Pronounced as per German pronunciation: [ˈledgard], yet Spaniards often dropped the final 'd' and changed the emphasis to the Spanish pronunciation: [leð'gaɾ]) Jiménez (28 November 1918 – 23 October 1995), best known as Kiko Ledgard, was a Peruvian actor and television presenter. He was one of the most popular game show hosts in the Spanish-speaking world both in Peru, with Haga negocio con Kiko, and later in Spain, with Un, dos, tres... responda otra vez on Televisión Española.

== Biography ==
The fourth of six siblings, Ledgard was the son of Carlos Ledgard Neuhaus, the president of Banco Alemán and former consul of Germany in Peru and later the Peruvian Ambassador to Argentina. His parental grandfather was British, born in London in 1851, and his grandmother's parents were German, originating in Hamburg. His mother was María Jiménez Correa. Ledgard enjoyed both art and sports at school.

He started working for BAOC and later at the Peruvian branch of IBM. At the end of the 1940s, he became a successful boxer in his home country, under the name Rodolfo Jiménez. Ledgard left his post at IBM just before his marriage to decorate children's homes: his business folded not long after its start.

Ledgard worked for the advertising agency McCann-Eriksson, which allowed him to make regular radio announcements. With his celebrity profile from his boxing career and movie-star looks, Ledgard could move into television with La pareja 6 on Canal 4, a format similar to The Newlywed Game, testing how well couples knew each other. The show was a success and was eventually spun off into La familia 6.

In the 1960s Ledgard embarked on a short trip to the USA to analyse how the country did television. Upon his return to Peru, Ledgard invented a series of game show formats. His charisma and popularity led to the creation of a special timeslot on Canal 4, during which a different Ledgard format was shown every weekday, including A concentrarse, Do-re-mi, Venciendo con vencedor, and Bata pone el mundo a sus pies. In 1965, he swapped to Canal 5 in which he branched out to other genres including music programmes and children's shows.

In 1969, Ledgard was invited to host a Peruvian version of Let's Make a Deal, which had previously flopped in the country. Ledgard's version, Haga negocio con Kiko, started as a 15-minute segment of his Sunday night variety show, before eventually being extended to a 90-minute show once it became a hit.

Ledgard moved to Spain in 1971 due to the economic crisis under Juan Velasco Alvarado. He then signed with Televisión Española (TVE), where he returned to children's television with the show Hoy también es fiesta between 1971 and 1972.

Ledgard eventually made contact with Chicho Ibáñez Serrador, who liked the idea of a Spanish game show with a similar variety-based spirit to Haga negocio con Kiko. This aired on TVE as Un, dos, tres... responda otra vez, which for the first time combined a revolving cast of characters, models, and big prizes. The show became a massive hit, and Ledgard remained as host until 1978. He won two TP de Oro awards for his work on the show: in 1972 for Best Presenter; and in 1976 for Most Popular Personality. He would later host game show sections on Todo es posible en domingo in 1974 and on 300 millones in 1979.

On 7 May 1981, Ledgard returned to Peru to announce that he would return to work with Canal 4, at the Country Club Hotel in Lima, however he fell from the railings of the club's second floor. The brain damage he received from this near-fatal accident forced his early retirement from television. His final appearance on the small screen was in 1984 on a summer programme called Superstar, with Ledgard rising from the audience and questioning whether the show's viewers still remembered him.

Ledgard died in 1995 in Madrid from a myocardial infarction.

== Personal life ==
Ledgard married Ana Teresa Marrou Freundt in his native Peru and they had eleven children. They remained together until his death in 1995.

In 1973, Ledgard's mother-in-law, Manuela Freundt, was kidnapped by an anonymous writer, wanting a ransom of $200,000. Ledgard and his family did not pay, and she was eventually killed. A family friend, Jorge Amado Granell, was arrested and later released without charge. The offender was never found.
