= Marisa Medina =

Spanish TV presenter, singer, and actress (1942–2012)

- Medina in 1971
- Born: María Luisa Guiu Medina; 2 December 1942; Madrid, Spain
- Died: 11 April 2012 (aged 69); Madrid, Spain
- Spouse: Alfonso Santisteban (m. 1970; div. 1994)
- Children: 3

María Luisa Guiu Medina (2 December 1942 – 11 April 2012), better known as Marisa Medina, was a Spanish television presenter, singer, and actress.

== Biography ==
She began her career at Televisión Española (TVE) as a dedicated announcer reading scripts for cultural programs. She made her debut before the cameras in 1962 in the program En antena. Subsequently made numerous appearances in many other programs, mainly during the sixties and seventies, being for a long time the most popular continuity announcer, and presenting special programs such as music festivals. She made some forays into the world of cinema and song, to share the stage with Julio Iglesias. In 2000, she collaborated in some programs of Telecinco, such as TNT presented by Jordi González.

== Personal life ==
In 1970 Medina married the composer Alfonso Santisteban, with whom she had three daughters. They divorced in 1994.

On 9 May 2009 Medina appeared in the television program DEC, on Antena 3, speaking about colon cancer and hepatocarcinoma. On 27 August 2010, in an interview on the program Sálvame Deluxe, she confirmed that she had one or two years to live.

Medina died on 11 April 2012 at age 69 of colon and liver cancer.

== Awards ==
In 1967, received the Antena de Oro award.

== Published books ==
- In 1967 she published the book of poetry Quien espera.
- In 2003 she wrote the autobiography Canalla de mis noches.

== Featured works in television ==
- Escuela TV (1962)
- En antena (1963–1965)
- Fin de semana (1963–1968)
- Manos al volante (1968)
- Noches de Europa (1968)
- Nivel de vida (1968–1970)
- Todo es posible en domingo (1974)
- Andante (1977)
- 625 Líneas (1979–1981)
- Vamos a ver (1981)
- Próximamente (1982)
- Llave en mano (1991)

== Selected Filmography ==
- Si Fulano fuese Mengano (1971)
- La casa de los Martínez (1971)
- En un mundo nuevo (1972)
- Las señoritas de mala compañía (1973)
- Los caballeros del botón de ancla (1974)
- Tres suecas para tres rodríguez (1975)
- Eva, limpia como los chorros del oro (1977)
- Uno del millón de muertos (1977)
- La loca historia de los tres mosqueteros (1983)
- Torrente 3: el protector (2005)
