= Paul Erangey =

British actor

Paul Erangey (18 September 1966 – 1 April 2004) was a British actor.

Erangey had his first experience as actor in 1979 when he played in the British production of Penmarric as young Marcus. He became famous all over Europe after he starred in Brendon Chase as Harold Hensman.

In 1982 he finished his career as a young actor. He died in 2004; he was 37 years old.
