= +TVI =

Portuguese pay TV channel

- Country: Portugal
- Broadcast area: Portugal; Angola; Mozambique

Programming
- Picture format: 16:9/4:3 (576i, SDTV)

Ownership
- Owner: TVI (Media Capital)
- Sister channels: TVI; TVI 24; TVI Ficção; TVI Reality; TVI Internacional; TVI África

History
- Launched: January 25, 2013; 13 years ago
- Closed: December 1, 2015; 10 years ago

Links
- Website: Mais TVI

Mais TVI (stylized as +TVI) was a Portuguese digital cable and satellite television channel owned by TVI. The channel provided entertainment programming including TVI originals and international talk-shows.

The channel appeared after an agreement between TVI and NOS, formerly named ZON, on August 1, 2012. In Portugal it has an exclusivity contract with NOS television services, in a similar manner to its sister channel TVI Ficção with MEO. Both channels carry distinct programming.

The channel ended its broadcast on December 1, 2015, with a NOS test card (featuring sound from the Brazilian TV show Pânico na Band, that was broadcasting due to automated continuity).

== History ==
=== Partnership between TVI and NOS ===
On August 1, 2012, +TVI and NOS (formerly ZON) signed a partnership to launch +TVI. It was signed by Rodrigo Costa, ZON's president and Media Capital's CEO Rosa Cullell. It was revealed that the channel would have a post-summer launch and that it would be broadcast in high definition, none of which happened at the time.

The channel was closed on December 1, 2015, due to the launch of another NOS exclusive TVI channel, TVI Reality, according to Media Capital's communications director Helena Forjaz.

The channel kept its exclusivity to its last day.

== Shows ==
=== Exclusive shows ===
- On Rec with Paulo Vintém
- Tropa do Humor with João Pedro Santos
- Dança Com As Estrelas - backstage with Rita Pereira
- Pancas da Semana - with Alexandre Santos and NTS

=== Discontinued exclusive shows ===
- Spot + with Iva Domingues
- É a Vida, Alvim! with Fernando Alvim
- Video Pop with Leonor Poeiras and Nuno Eiró
- Tu Cá Tu Lá with Manuel Luís Goucha
- Vox – Em Busca da Comédia with Carlos Moura

=== Other shows ===
- A Tua Cara Não Me É Estranha - backstage
- Guestlist
- Fotografia Total
- Take Off

=== International Shows ===
- 101 Ways to Leave a Gameshow
- Love in the Wild
- Wipeout
- The Tonight Show with Jimmy Fallon
- Late Night with Seth Meyers
- Excused
- ET - Entretenimento Total
- ABC do Sexo
- OBESOS - A Transformação Extrema
- The Insider
- Pânico na Band
- The Block
- Comedy Central Roast

=== TVI replays ===
- Perdidos na Tribo
- Fear Factor - Desafio Total
- Uma Canção para Ti
- A Tua Cara não me é Estranha
- Big Brother
- Melhor do que Falecer

=== Episodes ===
- Ele é Ela
- Olá Pai!
- Destino Imortal
- 37
- O Dom
- Redenção
- O Amor é um Sonho
- Dias Felizes
- Crianças S.O.S
- Clube das Chaves
- O Bando dos Quatro
- Campeões e Detectives
- Detetive Maravilhas
- Morangos com Açúcar (3rd-9th seasons)

=== Special broadcasts ===
- Festa de Lançamento +TVI
- Concerto I Heart Radio Music
- NOS Air Race Championship
