= Massa Fresca =

- Genre: Comedy drama
- Created by: Sara Rodi
- Directed by: Hugo de Sousa
- Starring: Mafalda Marafusta; Duarte Gomes; Pedro Carvalho; Dina Félix da Costa; Catarina Avelar; Ruy de Carvalho; Rita Ribeiro; Sara Barradas; Carlos Oliveira
- Theme music composer: Andreia João
- Opening theme: "Massa Fresca"
- Ending theme: "Massa Fresca"
- Country of origin: Portugal
- No. of seasons: 1
- No. of episodes: 97

Production
- Running time: ± 40 min
- Production company: Plural Entertainment

Original release
- Release: 25 April – 10 September 2016

Massa Fresca (lit. 'Fresh Pasta') is a Portuguese television series of the youth genre broadcast simultaneously on TVI and TVI Ficção between 25 April and 10 September 2016, starring Mafalda Marafusta and Duarte Gomes. Biggs started broadcasting the series on 12 April 2021. It returned to TVI Ficção on 3 September 2022, replacing Ana e os Sete in the weekend series slot, broadcast at 10 pm.

In 2020, Massa Fresca was also broadcast on the TVI África channel. In 2024, it was part of the TVI Internacional schedule. In the summer of 2025, it began airing in the early morning hours on TVI, with this rerun lasting until 29 October of the same year.

Since 10 September 2016, all episodes have been available on TVI Player. As of 2024, the series is available on the Portuguese Amazon Prime Video platform.

Since 7 May 2026, the series has been airing on Thursdays on VinTV.

== Details ==
Written by Sara Rodi, it was produced by Plural Entertainment. This was another TVI bet for the late afternoon slot, at 7:00 pm, as were previous projects of the same genre. Initially, the title of the series was Quatro Estações (English: Four Seasons).

Mafalda Marafusta plays the protagonist Maria, with Duarte Gomes, Pedro Carvalho, Dina Félix da Costa, Beatriz Barosa, Artur Dinis, Beatriz Leonardo, Gonçalo Oliveira, Maria Eduarda Laranjeira, Catarina Avelar, Ruy de Carvalho, Rita Ribeiro, Sara Barradas and Carlos Oliveira also in leading roles.

== Synopsis ==
Maria Miguel (Mafalda Marafusta) is a 21-year-old who lost her mother to cancer three years ago and never knew her father (whom she meets in the final episodes), forcing her to fight daily for her livelihood. Before becoming an orphan, Maria was preparing to finish her 12th grade and study singing in London, but the money she saved ended up being used for her mother's treatments, accumulating a substantial debt. She works at Telepizza and remains an optimistic and cheerful young woman, but life has taught her to live one day at a time, without grand plans. Her life changes drastically when, on her way to deliver pizzas, she tries to avoid running over two children by throwing herself on her motorbike against a speeding car. The accident leaves her with some injuries, and the children's parents, grateful for Maria's heroic act, take her home to help her recover.

This is how Maria, a young woman accustomed to overcoming her difficulties alone, finds herself in the heart of a wealthy family with five children between the ages of 5 and 17, each with their own challenges, passions, and struggles typical of their age, which we will also see reflected in their daily lives at the school they attend. Everything becomes even more complicated when the couple decides to take a honeymoon trip and dies in a car accident. Maria is then left in charge of the couple's five children, a responsibility shared with the children's paternal uncle, Francisco (Duarte Gomes), who meanwhile falls in love with her, a maternal aunt, Branca (Dina Félix da Costa), interested in the family's money, and the two housemaids, who give her more headaches than solutions to the problems that arise.

Maria is a courageous and determined young woman who, despite all the mistakes she makes and obstacles she faces, doesn't give up trying to keep her family together and help each of the young Elias grow up healthy and happy. Helping Maria take care of the young Elias is Artur (Pedro Carvalho), a very handsome and proper man who is also the children's doctor. He becomes charmed by her and starts visiting the Elias's home more and more frequently. In trying to help the eldest Elias daughter advance her band, Maria also sees her own musical career catapulted.

== Cast ==
Actor/Actress	Character
Mafalda Marafusta	Maria Miguel
Duarte Gomes	Francisco Elias
Pedro Carvalho	Dr. Artur
Beatriz Barosa	Catarina Castro Elias
Artur Dinis	Salvador Castro Elias
Beatriz Leonardo	Leonor Castro Elias
Gonçalo Oliveira	Simão Castro Elias
Maria Eduarda Laranjeira	Teresa Castro Elias (Teresinha)
Mercês Borges	Constança Castro Semião
Dina Félix da Costa	Branca Castro Semião
Carlos Oliveira	Diamantino Vilela
Sara Barradas	Margarida Afonso (Guida)
João Bonneville	Sérgio Silva
Ana Brito e Cunha	Maria Albertina (Tininha) da Conceição Silva
Catarina Avelar	Maria Miquelina De Santarém (Grandma Miquinhas)
Ruy de Carvalho	Luciano Castro (Grandpa Luciano)
Rita Ribeiro	Maria José (Zezinha)
Inês Gonçalves	Célia Veiga
Susana Sá	Antónia Félix
Pedro Moldão	Sebastião Félix
Daniela Melchior	Carminho Santiago
Francisco Fernandez	Pedro Tavares
Bruno Páscoa	Carlos Graça Saraiva (Catita)
Ruben Valle	João Gouveia
Guilherme Filipe	Manuel Pereira
Sylvie Dias	Carla Junqueiro
Nuno Pardal	Hugo Santos
Isabel Figueira	Bárbara Moreira
Sofia Grillo	Mariana Belo
Lourenço Henriques	Tiago Belo
Miguel Ruivo	Gustavo Belo Simões (Guga)
Maria Emília Correia	Arlete Graça
Pedro Bargado	Armando Saraiva
Lavínia Moreira	Alice Graça Saraiva
Guilherme Rocha	Fernando Graça Saraiva (Nando)

=== Special appearances ===
Actor/Actress	Character
Pedro Lima	Vicente Elias
Sofia Alves	Inês Castro Elias
Alda Gomes	Rafaela
André Caramujo	Gang member
António Calvário	Himself
António Évora	Alberto
Augusto Portela	Dr. Perestrelo
Camilo Reis	Cantor
Carlos Sebastião	Worker at the Vidrelias factory
Catarina Requeijo	Lara Piçarra (doctor)
Cátia Nunes	Filomena
Conguito	Himself
Cristina Ferreira	Herself
Abraham Mateo	Himself
Elsa Valentim	Beatriz (Maria's mother)
Eurico Lopes	Duda (Maria's father)
Fernando Rodrigues	Businessman from Monaco
Francisco Arraiol	Rui
Francisco Beatriz	Anchor of the news programme
Heitor Lourenço	Lourenço Fenix
Hugo Costa Ramos	Drug dealer
João Cachola	Jota (Carminho's boyfriend)
Jorge Mota	Dr. Cabral
Kiko	Himself
Liliana Leite	Italian
Lourenço Seruya	Paparazzi
Luís Lucas	Dr. Edmundo Gaspar (the doctor who treats Inês in Mónaco)
Manuel Luís Goucha	Himself
Maria Hasse	Marina
Mariema	Graciete
Martim Barbeiro	Student who gets into a fight with Guga
Martim Pedroso	Joaquim
Peperan	Herself
Rafael Gomes	Raí
Rui Luís Brás	Vitorino Simões (Guga's father)
Sónia Aragão	Dra. Fátima (Celia's doctor)
Tiago Miguel	Himself
Fátima Lopes	Herself

== Broadcast ==
On its premiere, 25 April 2016, Massa Fresca registered a 7.4% rating and a 20.2% share, leading the ratings. During its 99 episodes, the series maintained second place in the ratings. The last episode, on 10 September, scored a 5.2% rating and an 18.8% share. It had a final average of 5.5% rating and 17.5% share.

Average		Episodes shown	Rating	Share
2016	April	5	7.4%	21.5%
2016	May	20	6.5%	18.8%
2016	June	21	5.4%	17.0%
2016	July	20	4.9%	16.2%
2016	August	22	5.1%	16.8%
2016	September	9	5.6%	18.9%
Total		97	5.8%	18.2%

Note: Each rating point is equivalent to 95,000 viewers. This data includes same-day delayed viewing (VOSDAL).

== See also ==
- List of teen dramas
