= Romântica FM =

Radio station in Portugal

- Lisbon; Portugal
- Broadcast area: Lisbon

Programming
- Language: Portuguese

History
- Founded: 1998; 28 years ago
- Last air date: 26 January 2011; 15 years ago

Romântica FM was a Portuguese radio station founded in 1998, owned by Grupo Media Capital. The station carried love songs and closed around 2010.

== History ==
Romântica FM started broadcasting in 1998; in April 1999, the station, formerly part of the same group as Rádio Cidade, was now part of the same group as Rádio Comercial and appeared for the first time on BAREME's rankings, registering a 0,5% share. On July 7, 1999, the station held a concert broadcast on TVI, Noite Romântica, with the participation of singers such as Toy, Adelaide Ferreira, João Pedro Pais, Lucas e Mateus and some local boy bands. Given the success of the initiative (giving TVI 20% share), a second edition was scheduled for September.

As of early 2003, Romântica FM was broadcasting on six transmitters: 101.1 Lisboa, 89.5 Porto, 103.0 Coimbra, 101.0 Aveiro, 97.4 Vila Real and 99.3 Santarém. Later in the year, it lost some transmitters to other MCR networks: 89.5 in Porto was given to Rádio Clube Português and the local relay moved to 100.8, 103.0 in Coimbra to Best Rock FM, 101.0 in Aveiro to RCP, 97.4 in Vila Real to RCP and 99.3 in Santarém to Cidade FM. With these changes, its coverage area was limited to Lisbon and Porto.

In 2007, Carlos Ribeiro became one of the station's presenters. At the time, the station catered an older audience, but began attracting a higher number of listeners in their thirties and forties by including tracks from Mickael Carreira, Pedro Abrunhosa and Marco Paulo in its rotation. The station also published CDs, including a compilation album by singer Beto, who died in 2010 following a stroke. In October 2009, presenter José Candeias was fired by MCR.

At the end of the year, it was announced that Vodafone FM would take over its two remaining FM frequencies. At midnight on January 26, 2011, Romântica FM was replaced by the aforementioned network.
