= Cotonete =

Portuguese online radio service

Cotonete (Portuguese for cotton swab, which was used in its logo; Stylized in all-lowercase as cotonete with emphasis on the net) was a Portuguese website in 2001 owned by Media Capital Rádios. It enabled listeners to create their own radio stations, as well as having content drawn in from MCR's brands.

Apart from a period between 2005 and 2010 where it was hosted on Clix's servers, the service was hosted on IOL, a website created by Media Capital, from launch to closure in 2015.

== History ==
Cotonete launched on 23 July 2001, during the worldwide boom of online radio stations at the height of the dot com bubble. The pilot service started with ten themed stations: Portuguese music, alternative, ballads, classic, dance, fado, jazz, pop rock, "cotton club" and "teenager". These stations would likely not be available from September. Also excluded from the launch was the possibility of surveys on listener preferences, which was still being evaluated in the first two months of operation. In addition to the theme stations, Cotonete also housed streams of Rádio Comercial, Rádio Nostalgia, Mix FM, Rádio Nacional, Rádio Cidade and Romântica FM, as well as the possibility of letting the user create their own station, out of a portfolio of over 10,000 songs. Downloading songs was not allowed.

The personalized stations, however, ended in 2004, as Cotonete benefitted from such a service due to legal loopholes in European law, in absence of a Portuguese legislation. After that, the service was replaced by a station following the type of music the listener preferred.

In its early years, there was also Maisfutebol Rádio, which was available on both Cotonete and Maisfutebol's website.

A podcast service began in May 2005; in early July, a Rádio Podcast was created, airing a stream of the latest podcasts.

At 12pm on 15 July 2005, Cotonete, as well as all MCR stations, migrated from IOL to Clix, which hoped to increase its traffic. The goal was to reach 1,4 million listeners each month. On 1 April 2006, the Kulto magazine, available as a supplement on Sundays with Público at the time, gained its own station there.

On 15 September 2006, to mark its fifth anniversary, Cotonete unveiled a new look, and negotiated with two record labels to bring back the personalized radio stations. At the time, it had a staff of 20 and represented 60% of online radio in Portugal. Between January and September 2007, per a Marktest Netpanel study, 366,000 users accessed its website, just behind Cidade FM and RFM.

On 6 July 2009, Cotonete updated its website again, with new sections. As of 9 September 2011 (date of its tenth anniversary), the site received an average 30,000 visitors a day, had over 300 theme radio stations and had the largest Portuguese-language music database on the internet.

Cotonete wound down operations during 2015; in December, its staff was down to a single reporter covering Vodafone Mexefest 2015, while the online radio servers had already shut down.
