= Beatriz Barosa =

Portuguese actress (born 1997)

- Born: Beatriz Barosa Oliveira; 17 January 1997 (age 29); Porto, Portugal
- Occupation: Actress
- Years active: 2016–present

Beatriz Barosa Oliveira (born 17 January 1997) is a Portuguese actress.

== Biography ==
Beatriz was born in Porto on 17 January 1997. At the age of 14, she began taking extracurricular drama classes with actress Teresa Chaves, later enrolling in the acting course at the Academia Contemporânea do Espetáculo. Pursuing her acting career, she moved to Lisbon in 2015 at the age of 18, making her professional debut the following year in the youth series Massa Fresca, broadcast by TVI. She subsequently joined the cast of several fiction productions, such as Vidago Palace and Circo Paraíso (RTP1), as well as Amar Demais and Amar Depois de Amar (TVI).

In 2018, she was part of the musical Grease, starring Diogo Morgado and Mariana Marques Guedes. In cinema, she participated in the films Libertin (2019) and Biscoito da Fortuna (2021). In addition to her extensive work in television and cinema, she has also participated in various theater plays, including Viagem Medieval (2013), Faça o Favor de Entrar (2015), Istambul-Istambul (2019), A Ratoeira (2020), and Tenho um Papel Para Ti (2025).

In 2021, she was one of the protagonists of the comic telenovela Festa É Festa on TVI, playing the role of Ana Carolina, which brought her significant recognition. Another notable milestone in her career was her participation in the successful SIC telenovela A Herança in 2025.

Beatriz Barosa is the sister of fellow actress Luisinha Oliveira.

== Personal life ==
From 2021 to 2025, she dated actor and comedian Manuel Marques. The two actors fell in love during the filming of the TVI telenovela Festa É Festa.

== Filmography ==
=== Television ===
Year	Project	Role	Notes	Network
2016	Massa Fresca	Catarina Castro Elias	Main cast	TVI
2017	Vidago Palace	São da Silva	Main cast	RTP1
2018–2019	Circo Paraíso	Sara	Recurring cast	RTP1
2019	Amar Depois de Amar	Inês	Additional cast	TVI
2020–2021	Amar Demais	Rita Antunes Stevens	Recurring cast	TVI
2021–2025	Festa É Festa	Ana Carolina Brito	Main cast	TVI
2025	A Herança	Rosário «Rosarinho» Gouveia de Armas	Additional cast	SIC
