= Rádio Voxx =

Defunct Portuguese alternative radio station

- Portugal
- Frequency: 91.2 MHz (Lisbon)

Programming
- Format: Alternative

Ownership
- Owner: Media Capital Rádios (at time of closure)

History
- First air date: 21 December 1998
- Last air date: 2005

Rádio Voxx, also simply known as Voxx and sometimes Boxx, was an independent radio station available in Lisbon from the 1990s to 2005. The station was founded by Ricardo Casimiro and Jaime Fernandes using their company Côco - Companhia de Comunicação, and rose into prominence following the shutdown of XFM in 1997. Casimiro sold the station to Media Capital in 2003, eventually closing in 2005.

== History ==
Voxx started broadcasting in on December 21, 1998, following the closure of XFM on July 31, 1997. It broadcast a variety of music programs, but was also known for its innovative style that was not entirely dependent on music. Under the slogan "a melhor música cá do prédio" (the best music of the building), it expressed itself in being different from the major radio stations.

Historically, Voxx was known for its virtually nonexistent ratings in the BAREME measurements. The station was also known for its spoken jingles, one of which being "a petinga do éter num mar infestado de tubarões", reflecting its status as a minor player with limited audience, while the "sharks" refer to the larger players.

Another project was 7 Noites, 7 DJs where, each night, a different DJ would play music for two hours each evening. Genres included techno, house and psychedelic trance.

In 1998, the two founded a second station, Rádio Luna.

Two of its iconic presenters, Carlos Cardoso and Sofia Morais, left the station on October 1, 2000.

In April 2002, RDP and Antena 3, through its director Luis Montez, sued Voxx for defamation. The lawsuit came after Voxx aired declarations from Montez that he was using Antena 3 to promote the events of his company (Música no Coração). Casimiro and Montez refused to share their opinion.

Luís Nobre Guedes' company Rádio Milénio acquired the Côco stations (Voxx and Luna) in October 2003; then at midnight on March 7, 2004, Voxx shut down its regular service after seven years. The plan was to replace the stations with other MCR networks.

Voxx shut down on October 1, 2005, its two frequencies (90.0 Porto and 91.6 Lisbon) were given to Cidade FM to improve its coverage area.
