= RTL Radio =

Coordinates: 49°38′13.23″N 6°09′50.15″E

- Feel Good Music von den 80ern bis heute
- Germany
- Broadcast area: Germany; Luxembourg
- Frequencies: FM: 97.0 MHz (Northern Luxembourg); DAB+: Various (Germany and Luxembourg); Astra: 12,604 GHz
- RDS: RTLRADIO

Programming
- Language: German
- Format: Hot adult contemporary (since 1 July 2015)

Ownership
- Owner: RTL Group
- Sister stations: 89.0 RTL; 104.6 RTL; Toggo Radio

History
- First air date: 15 July 1957; 69 years ago
- Former names: Radio Luxemburg (1957–1988); RTL Hörfunk (1988–1990); RTL – Der Oldiesender (1992–1996)
- Former frequencies: AM: 1439/1440 kHz (until 31 December 2015); Shortwave: 6090 kHz

Links
- Website: Listen live

RTL Radio Germany is the biggest commercial Radio-Industrie group in Germany, Luxemburg, Portugal, France and Belgium. It is based in Berlin and part of the RTL Group.

RTL Radio Deutschland has stakes in almost 29 stations in Germany, including 104.6 RTL in Berlin, Antenne Niedersachsen and Radio Hamburg.

The largest station of the network is RTL Radio, which originated as the German language service of Radio Luxembourg, which began broadcasting after World War II from Luxembourg. It broadcasts adult contemporary music nationally via cable, DAB+, satellite, internet and regionally via FM in Luxembourg, Rheinland-Pfalz, Saarland, eastern German-speaking Belgium, and Lorraine.

== RTL radio ==
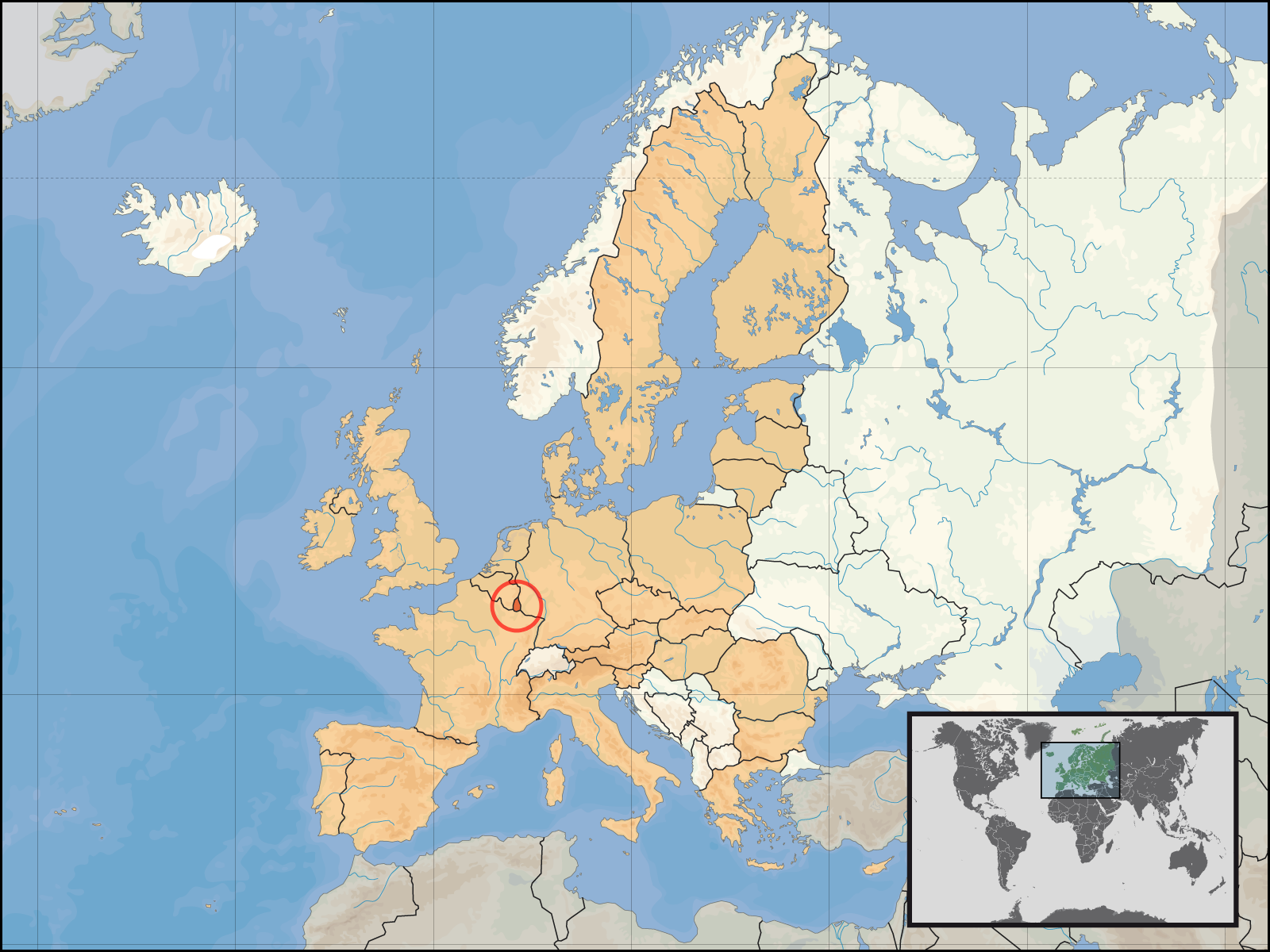
Location of Luxembourg (circled)

RTL Radio began broadcasting as the German service of Radio Luxembourg on 15 July 1957. Along with the Saarland-based pirate radio Europe 1, Luxembourg interfered with the non-commercial monopoly imposed by the German states since broadcasting first started in the country. Apart from advertising reaching German radios for the first time, RTL also introduced Germans from both East and West to rock-and-roll, bebop/cool jazz and other types of American popular music which contrasted to the classical repertoire that had dominated mainland services.

In 1988, Radio Luxembourg was renamed RTL Hörfunk. On 1 July 2015 RTL Radio branded itself RTL Radio – Deutschlands Hit-Radio and moved its studios from the City of Luxembourg to Berlin.

In June 2026 the radiostation changed name and format into RTL Radio and now Broadcast feel good music.

RTL Radio has slots on analog and digital cable, and transmits digital signals via the Astra 1L satellites.

== Radio stations of RTL Group ==
=== Owned and operated by RTL Group ===
- 104,6 RTL, FM radio station for Berlin
- 105`5 Spreeradio, FM radio station for Berlin
- Hitradio RTL Sachsen, FM-station for Saxony
- Toggo Radio, childrens program, DAB+ nationwide
- The Wave, DVB-T station for Berlin
- Big FM, FM-station in Baden-Württemberg
- Radio Regenbogen, FM-station in Baden-Württemberg, Germany
- RTL (Neuilly-sur-Seine)
- RTL 2 (Neuilly-sur-Seine)
- RTL Radio Lëtzebuerg (Luxemburg)
- Fun Radio, FM-station in Neuilly-sur-Seine, France

=== Stations with shares by RTL Radio ===
- Antenne Bayern (16 %), statewide FM station in Bavaria
- Antenne Niedersachsen (50 %), statewide FM station in Lower Saxony
- Antenne Thüringen (15 %), statewide FM station Thuringa
- Antenne Sylt, via Radio 21
- Best Rock FM, FM station in Lisbon, Portugal (33 %)
- Eldoradio, FM station in Luxemburg (74,8 %)
- Mint, FM-station in Bruesel, Belgium (49 %)
- Cidade FM, FM-station in Lisbon, Portugal (33 %)
- Hitradio RTL Sachsen (30,5 %), FM station in Saxony, Germany
- Oldie Antenne Hamburg (Hamburg, 4,78 %), FM station in Hamburg
- Radio 21 (17,3 %), FM station for Lower Saxony, Germany
- Radio Brocken (53,5 %), FM station for Saxony-Anhalt, Germany
- Rádio Clube (33 %), FM station for Lisbon, Portugal
- Rádio Comercial (33 %), FM station for Lissabon, Portugal
- Radio Hamburg (29,17 %), traditional FM station for Hamburg, Germany
- Radio NRW (16,96 %), statewide FM station in NRW, Germany
- Radio Ton (2 %), FM station for Baden-Württemberg, Germany
- Rock Antenne via Antenne Bayern
- Rock Antenne Hamburg via Rock Antenne
