= Manuel Luís Goucha =

Portuguese television presenter (born 1954)

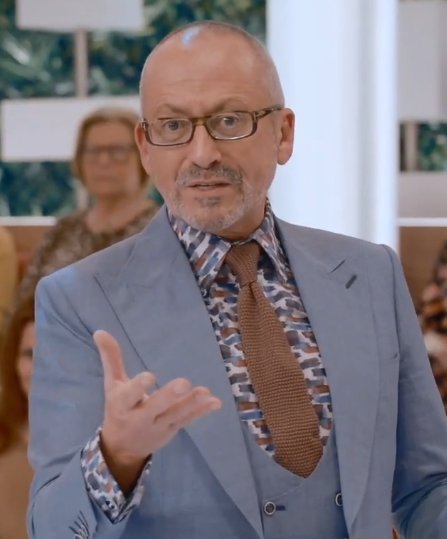
- Born: Manuel Luís Sousa Goucha; 25 December 1954 (age 71); Madalena, Lisbon, Portugal
- Occupations: TV host, journalist
- Years active: 1979 - present
- Spouse: Rui Oliveira (m. 2018)

Manuel Luís Nunes Sousa Goucha (born 25 December 1954) is a Portuguese television presenter and journalist (TVI). He is the presenter of a long-lasting morning show in RTP (Praça da Alegria), followed by another in rival TVI, Goucha was also known for culinary TV programmes and books, as well as a brief spell as an actor. He also owns a restaurant. Having publicly come out in the late 2000s, he is one of the best known Portuguese public figures who are openly homosexual. In spite of this, he is often criticized by Portuguese LGBT organizations, whose stance he dismisses.

Until August 2018, Cristina Ferreira presented the morning show Você na TV! with him, which he then continued to present with Maria Cerqueira Gomes. It was in that same show that, in January 2019, Goucha interviewed convicted criminal and Portuguese neo-nazi leader Mário Machado, for a conversation with the theme "Do we need a new Salazar?", which was widely panned. Você na TV! ended in December 2020 and Goucha now presents the afternoon show Goucha, which has been aired by TVI since January 2021.

== Career ==
=== RTP ===
- 1979 - Zé Gato (actor)
- 1984 - Crónica dos Bons Malandros (actor)
- 1984 - Gostosuras e Travessuras
- 1986 - Sebastião come tudo!
- 1987 - Portugal de Faca e Garfo
- 1988 - Sebastião na CEE
- 1991 - Sim ou Sopas
- 1993 - Olha que Dois
- 1994 - Viva à Manhã
- 1995 - A Grande Pirâmide
- 1995 - Efe-Erre-A
- 1996 - Avós e Netos
- 2000 - Santa Casa
- 1995-2002 - Praça da Alegria

=== TVI, TVI24 and +TVI ===
- 1993 - Momentos de Glória
- 2002-2004 - Olá Portugal
- 2004–2020 - Você na TV!
- 2007 - Casamento de Sonho (Judge)
- 2008, 2009 and 2011 - Uma Canção para Ti
- 2009 - Quem é o Melhor?
- 2010 - Mulheres da Minha Vida (TVI24)
- 2010 - De Homem Para Homem (TVI24)
- 2011 - Controversos (TVI24)
- 2011–present (recurring) - Somos Portugal
- 2012 - A Tua Cara Não Me é Estranha 1
- 2012 - A Tua Cara Não Me é Estranha 2
- 2012 - A Tua Cara Não Me é Estranha - Duetos
- 2013 - A Tua Cara Não Me é Estranha 3
- 2013 - Tu Cá Tu Lá (+TVI)
- 2014 - MasterChef Portugal (Season 1)
- 2014 - A Tua Cara Não Me é Estranha - Kids
- 2015 - MasterChef Portugal (Season 2)
- 2015 - Pequenos Gigantes (Judge)
- 2016 - MasterChef Júnior Portugal
- 2017 - MasterChef Júnior Portugal
- 2018 - Secret Story 7 (Reality TV Show)
- 2018 - Secret Story: O Reencontro (Reality TV Show)

Presenting World Events on TVI:

- 2011 - William & Kate's Wedding (UK)
- 2011 - Charlene & Alberto of Monaco's Wedding (Monaco)
- 2013 - Launch of TVI Internacional in the USA (New York City)

Specials:

- 2003 - Mãe Querida - "Mother's Day Special"
- 2005 - Gala de Natal TVI (TVI's Christmas Show)
- 2006 - Gala de Natal TVI (TVI's Christmas Show)
- 2007 - Viagem ao Mundo das Maravilhas
- 2007 - Gala de Natal TVI (TVI's Christmas Show)
- 2008 - Todos com Portugal
- 2008 - Gala de Natal TVI (TVI's Christmas Show)
- 2009 - Gala de Natal TVI (TVI's Christmas Show)
- 2010 - Gala Nicolau Breyner - 50 Anos de Carreira
- 2010 - Gala de Natal TVI (TVI's Christmas Show)
- 2011 - Especial Festas de São Mateus em Elvas
- 2011 - Especial Festas da Senhora da Agonia em Viana do Castelo
- 2011 - Gala de Natal TVI (TVI's Christmas Show)
- 2012 - Gala de Natal TVI, with Cristina Ferreira (TVI's Christmas Show)
- 2013 - Parabéns TVI - 20 Anos, with Cristina Ferreira and Fátima Lopes (TVI's Birthday Talk Show)
- 2013 - Gala 20 Anos TVI, with Cristina Ferreira (TVI's Birthday Show)
- 2013 - Gala das Estrelas TVI, with Cristina Ferreira and Fátima Lopes (TVI's Christmas Show)
- 2014 - Parabéns TVI - 21º Aniversário (TVI's Birthday Talk Show)
- 2014 - Gala das Estrelas TVI, with Cristina Ferreira and Fátima Lopes (TVI's Christmas Show)
- 2014 - Special guest on Juntos no Verão (talk-show)
- 2015 - Parabéns TVI - 22º Aniversário (TVI's Birthday Talk Show)
- 2015 - Juntos Fazemos a Festa
- 2015 - Natal Especial, with Cristina Ferreira and Fátima Lopes (TVI's Christmas Special Talk Show)
- 2016 - Especial Ano Novo - "Juntos Fazemos a Festa", with Cristina Ferreira and Fátima Lopes (TVI's New Year's Eve Special Talk Show)
- 2017 - TVI Gala das Estrelas with Cristina Ferreira and Fátima Lopes (TVI's Christmas Show)

== Awards ==
Manuel Luís Goucha was nominated and won several awards.

TV 7 Dias Awards
Year	Nominated	Category	Result
2009	Manuel Luís Goucha	Best Portuguese TV Presenter	Nominated
2009	Uma Canção Para Ti (Season 2)	Best Portuguese Entertainment TV Show	Nominated
2009	Você na TV	Best Portuguese Talk-Show	Winner
2010	Manuel Luís Goucha	Best Portuguese TV Presenter	Winner
2010	Você na TV	Best Portuguese Talk-Show	Nominated
2011	Manuel Luís Goucha	Best Portuguese TV Presenter	Nominated
2012	Manuel Luís Goucha	Best Portuguese TV Presenter	Nominated
2012	A Tua Cara Não Me É Estranha (Season 1, 2 and Duetos)	Best Portuguese Entertainment TV Show	Winner
2013	A Tua Cara Não Me É Estranha (Season 3)	Best Portuguese Entertainment TV Show	Winner
2013	Manuel Luís Goucha	Best Portuguese TV Presenter	Winner
2013	Você na TV	Best Portuguese Talk-Show	Nominated
2014	Manuel Luís Goucha	Best Portuguese TV Presenter	Winner
2014	Você na TV	Best Portuguese Talk-Show	Nominated
2014	A Tua Cara Não Me É Estranha: Kids	Melhor Programa de Entretenimento	Nominated
2014	MasterChef Portugal (Season 1)	Best Portuguese Entertainment TV Show	Nominated
