= Rádio Luna =

Portuguese classical music radio station

- Portugal
- Frequency: 106.2 MHz (Lisbon)

Programming
- Format: Classical

Ownership
- Owner: Côco - Companhia de Comunicação (1998-2003); Media Capital Rádios (at time of closure)

History
- First air date: December 1998
- Last air date: 2005

Rádio Luna was a Portuguese radio station that existed from 1998 to 2005. Created by Ricardo Casimiro and Jaime Fernandes of Côco - Companhia de Comunicação, also owners of Rádio Voxx, the station aired classical and jazz music. The station was sold to Media Capital in 2003, closed new programming on March 7, 2004, and finally shut down in 2005.

== History ==
Côco's founders, who had founded Rádio Voxx in 1997, decided to expand their radio project to a second station, which they conceived as a "lighter version of Antena 2". Its broadcasts started on the same week as Voxx, which started on December 21. The musical line-up was assembled by Guilherme Statter, who devised a concept for classical and jazz music to appear on general radio stations in a light manner, like rock music, "sometimes repeating tracks". Ricardo Casimiro, however, did not aim for an elitist station (like what Antena 2 is, then as now). As of February 2001, the station still lacked commercial advertising, and, like Voxx, was left out of listener surveys.

It, like Rádio Nostalgia, employed an automated system, which made it difficult to identify tracks due to the lack of announcers.

Luís Nobre Guedes's company Rádio Milénio acquired the Côco stations (Voxx and Luna) in October 2003. This would imply the license being used to relay another station. On March 5, 2004, it was announced that all programming would cease on March 7, delayed from a few days before. Statter, the station's director, said that it would relay other MCR networks after the cut-off date.

Since then, MCR tried to rebrand the station as Clássica FM, however AACS (the current ERC) rejected it under the grounds that a station with the same name existed. As of February 2005, it was set to wait for approval from the regulator to adopt the name Classe FM, and, if approved, it would change its schedule. Meanwhile, the station was still operating an automated service. The station remained automated until it closed at an unknown date, when it became a Cidade FM relay station.
