= Rainer Nitschke =

German radio and television presenter (1947–2026)

Rainer Nitschke (16 February 1947 – 10 May 2026) was a German radio and television presenter. He was widely referred to in the German press as "the voice of the South" (die Stimme des Südens) for his long association with Süddeutscher Rundfunk (SDR) and its successor Südwestrundfunk (SWR).

== Early life and career ==
Nitschke was born in 1947 in Stuttgart and grew up in the city. Through his fellow actress Ursula Herking, who had personal contacts at Radio Luxemburg, Nitschke was introduced to the broadcaster Camillo Felgen and joined the station in 1967 at the age of 20. At Radio Luxemburg he hosted programmes including Hallo, Nachtarbeiter, Der fröhliche Wecker and Funkkantine.

In 1969, Nitschke moved to Süddeutscher Rundfunk (SDR) in Stuttgart, which became his principal broadcaster for the rest of his public broadcasting career. Shows such as Gut aufgelegt, Leicht und beschwingt and Im Auto unterwegs, together with his work on the ARD night programme, earned him the nickname die Stimme des Südens ("the voice of the South"). He subsequently took on additional engagements at Bayerischer Rundfunk and Radio Bremen, but remained tied to his home broadcaster in Stuttgart.

As editor and presenter, Nitschke worked for the SDR programmes SDR1, SDR3 and S4 Baden-Württemberg, and continued on the successor station SWR4 Baden-Württemberg until 25 February 2012. While moderating the ARD night programme in November 1989, he was on air during the fall of the Berlin Wall and improvised the coverage with live switches to correspondents. On his interview show Zu Gast, his guests included Heiner Geißler, Hardy Krüger and Bernhard Grzimek; he also became personally close with the singer Freddy Quinn. Nitschke was credited in the press with helping to launch the career of Peter Maffay and was reported to have once thrown a young Nena out of one of his programmes.

From 1985 until July 2016, Nitschke worked in parallel as a freelance presenter at Westdeutscher Rundfunk (WDR), spending 31 years on its station WDR 4. He began at WDR as music editor and host of Pavillon, and later moderated Gut aufgelegt, à la Carte, Unser Nachmittag and Mehr Sonntag. He became particularly associated with the long-form "Super-Wunsch-Hitparaden" marathon broadcasts, which he often presented together with the singer Ulla Norden and his colleague Hermann Hillebrand.

After leaving WDR in 2016, Nitschke joined the nationwide oldies station Schwarzwaldradio in 2017, where he presented the Sunday programme variously titled Nitschke am Sonntag and Sonntag mit Nitschke for nine years. He also continued to present CDs and a talk show on Deutsches Musik-Fernsehen. In his later years he relocated from Cologne to Kehl to be closer to the Schwarzwaldradio studios in the Ortenau region.

== Death ==
Nitschke died on 10 May 2026, at the age of 79. His scheduled Sunday broadcast on Schwarzwaldradio had been cancelled the previous day due to circulatory problems.
