= Romantica =

Romantica may refer to:

== Music ==
- Romantica (band), an Americana band
- Romantica (album), a 2002 album by Luna
- "Romántica", one of the 12 Danzas españolas (1890) for piano by Enrique Granados
- "Romantica" (song), the winner of the Sanremo Music Festival and the Italian Eurovision Song Contest entry in 1960
- ”The Twins / Romantica”, a song from Duster’s 1998 debut album Stratosphere.

== Media ==
- Zone Romantica, a European TV channel owned by Zonemedia
- Romantica (TV channel), a Romanian version of Zone Romantica
- Romântica FM, a defunct Portuguese radio station

== Other ==
- Romantica, a trademark of the now-defunct Ellora's Cave for erotic romance novels
