= Mix FM (Portugal) =

Portuguese dance radio station

- Lisbon; Portugal
- Frequency: 103.0 MHz

Programming
- Format: Dance radio

Ownership
- Owner: Media Capital Rádios

History
- First air date: 1999
- Last air date: September 2011

Mix FM was a Portuguese dance radio station founded by Media Capital Rádios. The station broadcast with only one frequency, covering Lisbon. It closed in 2011 after years of inactivity.

== History ==
The station started broadcasting in 1999 during the rise in the amount of specialized radio stations; Mix FM came to be as a result of a survey which showed that there was an audience for rhythmdance. The station operated with the license of Rádio Nacional, its AM network. On July 7, 2001, a team of the station took part at Festival do Meco.

As of 2005, however, the station was still smaller than MCR's four larger networks (Comercial, RCP, Cidade FM, Best Rock FM)

In July 2009, ERC notified Rádio Nacional, owner of the Mix FM license, of the lack of a minimum quota for Portuguese music. The problem had existed before the then-AACS created a quota law for Portuguese tracks.

In June 2011, it was announced that Smooth FM would take over the remaining Mix FM frequency from September, bringing an end to the station after twelve years.
