= Star FM (Portugal) =

Radio station in Portugal

- Lisbon; Portugal
- Broadcast area: Lisbon

Programming
- Language: Portuguese

History
- Founded: 22 November 2010; 15 years ago
- Last air date: December 2013; 12 years ago (original)

Star FM was a Portuguese radio station founded on November 22, 2010, owned by Grupo Media Capital. It was launched to replace Rádio Clube Português on its AM network and broadcast oldies, similar to Rádio Sim. The station quietly closed in 2013.

== History ==
Following the surprise closure of RCP in July 2010 (ending its services following the end of the 2010 FIFA World Cup, Media Capital announced on August 31 that it would launch Star FM on its former AM and FM networks, set to launch in the coming weeks. Until then, a transitional version of RCP with oldies was heard on the transmitter network. Its license specifications according to the ERC request suggested that the playlist would contain Lusophone classics (from Portugal and Brazil) and even French and Italian songs, between the 1950s and 1970s. The new station started broadcasting on November 22, using five of its FM transmitters (Lisboa (96.6), Porto (105.8), Santarém (97.7), Manteigas (104.4), Sabugal (96.8)). The new station had Miguel Cruz (also director of M80) as its director, in turn, the station was formatted after Rádio Nostalgia (Portuguese version of the French Nostalgie), which shut down in 2003 to be replaced, precisely, by the third version of RCP, which initially had the same profile.

In June 2012, it was discovered that Star FM would centralize all of its broadcasts from Lisbon, following the passing of the new Radio Law in December 2010.

Star FM quietly shut down on December 1, 2013. In Sabugal, the frequency was taken over by M80. The replacement also implied the end of the two-hour news program produced for Sabugal that aired on weekdays.
