= Cristina Ferreira =

Portuguese television presenter

- Ferreira in 2026
- Born: Cristina Maria Jorge Ferreira; 9 September 1977 (age 49); Malveira, Mafra, Portugal
- Occupations: Television presenter; businesswoman
- Years active: 2002–present
- Awards: 2011: 2° Gala Troféu TV7Dias – Best TV Host of the Year.
- Website: dailycristina.com

Cristina Maria Jorge Ferreira (born 9 September 1977) is a Portuguese television presenter and businesswoman. Since the 2010s, she has been the highest-paid celebrity in Portugal (earning 232,000 euros per month, as of 2022).

== Biography ==
Born in Malveira, a small village of Mafra Municipality, 40 km from Lisbon, in 1977, Cristina graduated in History and taught it for a few years. Her parents were merchants in local fairs across the region.

She graduated in journalism and had prominent television presenters Manuel Luís Goucha and Júlia Pinheiro as her teachers. She began her television career on TVI, having hosted the daily "extra" Big Brother and the news show Diário da Manhã. From 2004 to 2018, she and Goucha hosted the morning talk show Você na TV!. During this period, Cristina gained status as one of the most high-profile celebrities in Portugal.

From 2012 to 2018, Cristina co-hosted the prime-time show A Tua Cara Não Me é Estranha, along with Goucha.

In 2017, she began hosting the show Apanha Se Puderes which was taped until Cristina moved to rival TV station SIC, in the second half of 2018. This deal was the most heavily publicised TV transference in Portugal in more than a decade. With this transfer she became a direct competitor of TVI and her previously co-hosted morning show at that channel.

At SIC, apart from holding a hosting role, it was reported she would also hold an executive consultancy role in the entertainment directorate of the channel.

In January 2019, Cristina began hosting her first programme on SIC, the morning show O Programa da Cristina, which directly competed with the show she co-hosted before, Você na TV!, hosted by Goucha, along with a new co-host, Maria Cerqueira Gomes. With O Programa da Cristina, SIC led the morning ratings for the first time in fourteen years. She received a phone call from President Marcelo Rebelo de Sousa (President of Portugal), which was televised live during the premiere episode of this show.

In the summer of 2020, Cristina Ferreira returned to TVI, this time as one of the shareholders. At 42, Cristina Ferreira left SIC after unilaterally terminating her contract two years early, prompting the broadcaster to seek compensation, which could range from €2 million to €4 million. This amount includes contractual obligations linked to call-in competitions. She re-joined TVI as a presenter, director of entertainment and fiction, and a non-executive board member, with a potential shareholding of up to 2%.

The channel SIC and Cristina Ferreira have reached a settlement, ending their legal dispute over a contract breach linked to Ferreira's return to TVI. SIC had filed a lawsuit against her in 2020, and in 2023, the Lisbon West District Court enforced the seizure of Amor Ponto's, Cristina's company, assets after a ruling ordered the company to pay over €3.3 million plus interest to SIC. The agreement brings the case to a close, though the details have not been disclosed.

In 2023, Media Capital, who owns TVI channel, announced that it has renewed its confidence in Cristina Ferreira by extending her association with TVI and appointing her as executive director of Media Capital Digital while retaining her role as director. The company stated that Ferreira will continue as director of entertainment and fiction and will also strengthen her contribution to new business and talent development.

Beyond her television career, Cristina Ferreira has also established herself as a businesswoman. She launched a fashion venture with her clothing store, Casiraghi Forever, based in Malveira. Her influence in the entertainment industry has been recognised by Forbes magazine, which ranked her second in the Entertainment category of its "Most Powerful in Business" list, scoring 68 points.

She has a son with her ex-boyfriend António Casinhas, a now-retired football player. She is a supporter of the football club S.L. Benfica.

== Businesswoman ==
Cristina Ferreira has been involved in various business ventures alongside her television career. She owns a clothing store, Casiraghi Forever, in Malveira and launched the website/blog Daily Cristina in 2013 to share aspects of her personal and professional life. She has published several books, including a cookbook, an autobiographical work, a guide to English conversation aimed at supporting underprivileged children, and a book addressing online verbal abuse. In 2014, she collaborated with Hush Puppies on a footwear line and launched the fragrance Meu in partnership with LR Health & Beauty, later introducing a men's version. She also published Revista Cristina, a monthly magazine from 2015 to 2024, which received the Arco-Íris Award in 2018.

== Television career ==
Year	Channel	Project	Role(s)
2002	RTP1	Regiões	Reporter
2002	TVI	Olá Portugal	Reporter
2003	TVI	Big Brother 4	Secondary host
2003	TVI	Diário da Manhã	Reporter
2004 – 2018	TVI	Você na TV!	Co-host with Manuel Luís Goucha
2007 – 2010	TVI	As Tardes da Júlia	Co-host with Júlia Pinheiro
2011	TVI	Uma Canção para Ti 4	Co-host with Manuel Luís Goucha
2011 – 2016	TVI	Somos Portugal	Occasional substitute host
2022 – 2023	TVI	Somos Portugal	Occasional substitute host
2011 – 2016	TVI	A Tarde É Sua	Occasional substitute host, covering for main host Fátima Lopes
2012	TVI	A Tua Cara Não Me É Estranha 1	Co-host with Manuel Luís Goucha
2012	TVI	A Tua Cara Não Me É Estranha 2	Co-host with Manuel Luís Goucha
2012	TVI	A Tua Cara Não Me É Estranha – Duets	Co-host with Manuel Luís Goucha
2013	TVI	A Tua Cara Não Me É Estranha 3	Co-host with Manuel Luís Goucha
2013	TVI	Dança com as Estrelas 1	Host
2014	TVI	A Tua Cara Não Me É Estranha: Kids	Co-host with Manuel Luís Goucha
2014	TVI	Dança com as Estrelas 2	Host
2015	TVI	Dança com as Estrelas 3	Co-host with Pedro Teixeira
2015	TVI	Cristina	Host
2015 – 2016	TVI	Juntos, Fazemos a Festa	Host
2016 – 2017	TVI	A Tua Cara Não Me É Estranha 4	Co-host with Manuel Luís Goucha
2017	TVI	A Tua Cara Não Me É Estranha – Special	Co-host with Manuel Luís Goucha
2017 – 2018	TVI	Apanha se Puderes	Co-host with Pedro Teixeira
2018	TVI	A Tua Cara Não Me É Estranha 5	Co-host with Manuel Luís Goucha
2019 – 2020	SIC	O Programa da Cristina	Host
2019	SIC	Prémio de Sonho	Host
2019	SIC	Globos de Ouro de 2019	Host
2020	TVI	Dia de Cristina	Host
2020	TVI	Em Família	Co-host with Manuel Luís Goucha
2020 – 2021	TVI	Conta-me	Host
2021	TVI	All Together Now	Host
2021 – 2022	TVI	Cristina ComVida	Host
2022	TVI	Big Brother Famosos 2022	Host
2022	TVI	Big Brother Famosos 2022 – 2nd season	Host
2022 – 2024	TVI	Goucha	Occasional substitute host, covering for main host Manuel Luís Goucha
2022	TVI	Big Brother – Desafio Final 1	Host
2022	TVI	Big Brother 2022	Host
2023	TVI	O Triângulo	Host
2023 – 2024	TVI	Dois às 10	Occasional co-host with Cláudio Ramos, substituting main host Maria Botelho Moniz
2023	TVI	Big Brother 2023	Host
2024	TVI	Dança com as Estrelas 6	Co-host with Bruno Cabrerizo
2024–present	TVI	Dois às 10	Co-host with Cláudio Ramos
2024	TVI	Secret Story – Casa dos Segredos 8	Host
2025	TVI	Secret Story – Casa dos Segredos 9	Host
2026	TVI	Secret Story – Casa dos Segredos 10	Host
2026	TVI	Secret Story – Desafio Final 6	Host
2026–present	TVI	Roda da Sorte	Host

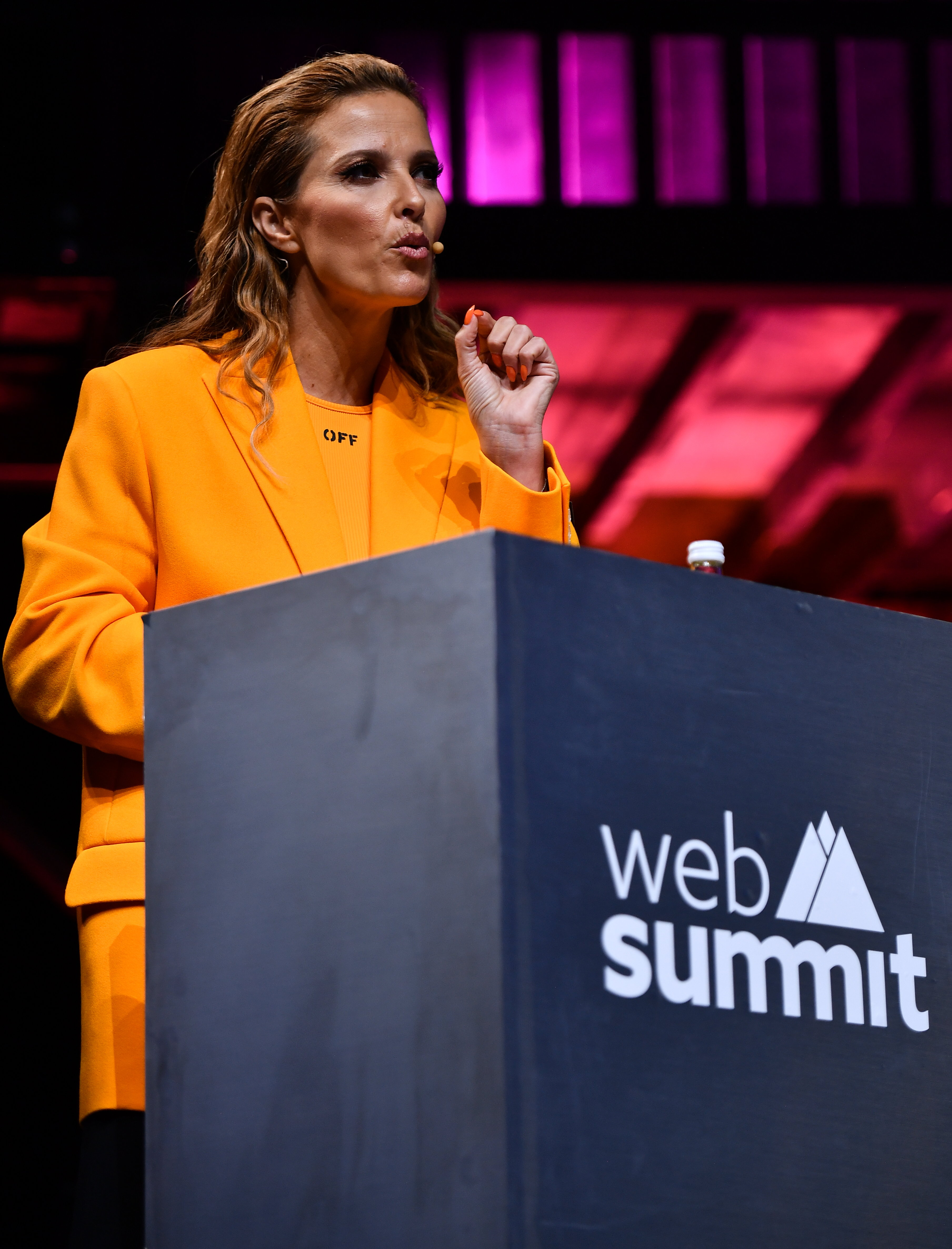
Cristina Ferreira, TVI, on Contentmakers Stage during day three of Web Summit 2021 at the Altice Arena in Lisbon, Portugal

== Other television works ==
- 2007: Viagem ao Mundo das Maravilhas
- 2009: Guest role in Telenovela Sentimentos
- 2010: As Tardes da Júlia, Replacing Júlia Pinheiro
- 2011: Festas de Ponte de Lima, Co-Host with Marisa Cruz
- 2011: Festa na Praia Albufeira, Co-Host with Nuno Eiró
- 2011: Festa Medieval de Óbidos, Co-Host with Nuno Eiró
- 2011: Festa dos Tabuleiros, Co-Host with Nuno Eiró
- 2011–2017: A Tarde É Sua TVI, Replacing Fátima Lopes
- 2012: A Tarde É Sua TVI, Replacing Fátima Lopes
- 2012–2017: Gala de Natal na TVI, Co-host with Manuel Luís Goucha
- 2013: 20 Anos da TVI, Co-host with Manuel Luís Goucha and Fátima Lopes

== Awards ==
- 2011: 2° Gala Troféu TV7Dias – Best TV Host of the Year category.
- 2019: Portuguese Golden Globes – Personality of the Year category.
