= Festa é Festa =

Portuguese telenovela

- Also known as: Festa é Festa 3: Cruzeiro (season 3, part 2); Festa é Festa: Verão (seasons 4,7)
- Genre: Telenovela
- Created by: TVI
- Developed by: Roberto Pereira
- Starring: Maria do Céu Guerra; Pedro Teixeira; Pedro Alves; Ana Guiomar; Ana Brito e Cunha; Sílvia Rizzo; Manuel Marques
- Opening theme: "Tu Queres é Festa" by Ruth Marlene
- Ending theme: "Tu Queres é Festa" by Ruth Marlene
- Country of origin: Portugal
- Original language: Portuguese
- No. of seasons: 10
- No. of episodes: 1200

Production
- Camera setup: Multi-camera
- Running time: ± 30-40 min.

Original release
- Network: TVI
- Release: 26 April 2021 – 13 September 2025

Festa é Festa (English: Life is a Party), also known as Festa é Festa 3: Cruzeiro in part 2 of season 3 and Festa é Festa: Verão in seasons 4 and 7, is a Portuguese telenovela broadcast and produced by TVI. It was announced on March 8, 2021 by Cristina Ferreira, and premiered on April 26, 2021. The plot is developed by Roberto Pereira, with some scenes being shot in Ribatejo.

== Plot ==
Festa é Festa tells the story of a village lost in time (like so many others in Portugal) and that this year is getting ready for the biggest and best village festival ever because it’s the 100th birthday of the village’s greatest benefactor. So everybody wants to shine at this festival, with their eyes on the old woman’s inheritance, and sparing no effort (as they’ve been doing for over 20 years, but the old woman just won’t die...). In Lisbon, the old woman’s impoverished son (a social climber and somewhat of a snob) has a plan to send his daughter (the old woman’s great-granddaughter) to the village so that she can build a relationship with the old woman, but with the excuse that his daughter is going there to recover from an unhappy love affair. And this is when this cosmopolitan, high-tech young woman from Lisbon, who is rather arrogant, ends up in this backwater against her will, with no 5G, cable TV, etc. Things are not looking good, but in the middle of it all, she falls in love with a young villager, who knows little or nothing about the world outside the village. In other words, two people from two completely different and opposing worlds. This young man is the son of the president of the parish council. Who is also the president of the festival committee. And the president of the local social club. And the football club. And a gravedigger. Basically, everything. A peacock who thinks he’s lord of the village. Everything his son criticizes and doesn’t want for himself. This is how, in such a typical Portuguese village, as they prepare as far in advance as possible for the festival of the year (there will be TV coverage and reporting by TVI), two young people from completely different worlds will experience love, proving that, in almost everything in life, the beauty of things lies in their simplicity...

== Cast ==
Actor/Actress	Character
Maria do Céu Guerra	Corcovada Brito
Pedro Teixeira	Tomé Trindade
Pedro Alves	Albino «Bino» Jesus
Ana Guiomar	Aida Trindade
Ana Brito e Cunha	Florinda Jesus
Manuel Marques	Fernando Silva
Sílvia Rizzo	Conceição «São» Silva
Beatriz Barosa	Ana Carolina Brito
Inês Herédia	Manuela «Nélinha» Chagas
José Carlos Pereira	Sôtor
Ana Marta Contente	Elizabete «Betinha» Trindade
Rodrigo Paganelli	Carlos Jesus
Manuel Melo	Jorge Festas
Luís Simões	António Peçanha
Marta Andrino	Fátima «Fátinha» Figo
Hélder Agapito	Paulo Pires
Vitor Norte	Manuel «Manel» Martins
Catarina Avelar	Glória Leitão
Carlos M. Cunha	Padre Isidro Botica
Filomena Gonçalves	Adelaide Festas
Vítor Emanuel	José Carlos Peixoto
Maria Sampaio	Valquíria Leão
Marta Gil	Camila Leitão
Ricardo Trêpa	João Maria Brito
Valdemar Brito	Louis Silva
Beatriz Costa	Vuitton Silva
Gonçalo Norton	Bruno
Francisca Cerqueira Gomes	Filipa
Eduardo Madeira	Matateu

== Series overview ==
Season	Episodes		Originally released	
Season	Episodes		First released	Last released
1	122		April 26, 2021	September 25, 2021
A Festa			September 25, 2021	
2	85		September 27, 2021	January 6, 2022
3	117	84	January 7, 2022	April 20, 2022
3	117	33	April 21, 2022	May 27, 2022
4 Verão	89		May 30, 2022	September 10, 2022
A Festa 2022			September 10, 2022	
5	99		September 12, 2022	January 7, 2023
6	155		January 9, 2023	July 14, 2023
7 Verão	59		July 17, 2023	September 26, 2023
8	87		September 27, 2023	January 4, 2024
9	134		January 5, 2024	July 26, 2024
10	TBA	53	July 30, 2024	October 17, 2024
10	TBA	TBA	October 18, 2024	TBA
