= Batida FM =

Portuguese radio station

- Portugal

Programming
- Format: Alternative music

Ownership
- Owner: Bauer Media Group
- Sister stations: Rádio Comercial, Cidade FM, M80 Radio, Smooth FM

History
- First air date: 5 August 2023

Links
- Webcast: Rayo
- Website: batida.fm

Batida FM is a Portuguese radio station owned by Bauer Media Audio. It began broadcasting on 5 August 2023, following the end of Vodafone FM. The station broadcasts alternative music.

== History ==
On 4 August 2023, it was announced to the public that Vodafone FM would be replaced by Batida FM the following day, which would be entirely produced by Bauer, following the end of the twelve-year partnership between Bauer (until 2022, Media Capital Rádios) and Vodafone Portugal.

The new identity also led to the downfall of its content production for social media platforms, where it uploaded band sessions. It still continued giving airtime to lesser-known musicians.

=== Possible closure ===
Since 2025, the Batida FM network has received interest from S.L. Benfica to use its frequencies to carry Benfica FM, which is an online radio station, thus enabling its access to FM frequencies. The club submitted its first proposal to ERC in July of that year, however ERC later rejected the association agreement with Bauer Media Audio to use its transmitter network.
