= List of programs broadcast by Televisão Independente =

This is a list of television programs currently broadcast (in first-run or reruns), scheduled to be broadcast or formerly broadcast on Televisão Independente.

== Current programming ==
=== Original programming ===
==== News and information ====
- Diário da Manhã (September 15, 2003 – present)
- Jornal da Uma (September 15, 2003 – present)
- Jornal das 8 (2011 – present)
- Os Comentários de Marcelo Rebelo de Sousa (2011 – 2015)
- Repórter TVI (2011 – present)

==== Telenovelas ====
- A Única Mulher (March 15, 2015 – present)
- Santa Bárbara (2015 – present)

==== Reality shows ====
- A Quinta (October 3, 2015 – present)

==== Sports ====
- UEFA Champions League

==== Talk shows ====
- A Tarde é Sua (January 3, 2011 – present)
- Somos Portugal (2012 – present)
- Você na TV! (September 13, 2004 – present)

==== Others ====
- Autores
- Euromilhões (2004 – present)
- Filmes TVI
- Missa - Oitavo Dia
- Querido, Mudei a Casa!

==== Reruns ====
===== Telenovelas =====
- Mundo Meu (2015 – present)
- Sonhos Traídos (2015 – present)

===== Kids =====
- Inspector Max (March 14, 2004 – 2005, first-run; 2005 – present, reruns)
- O Bando dos Quatro (2008 first-run; 2013 – present, reruns)

=== Acquired programming ===
==== TV shows/sitcoms ====
- Glee (April 10, 2010 – present)
- Hawaii Five-O (April 15, 2012 – present)
- Psych (2014 – present)

==== Kids ====
- Curious George
- Dora the Explorer
- Fanboy & Chum Chum
- Mia and Me
- The New Woody Woodpecker Show
