= Benfica FM =

Benfica FM FM
- Portugal

Programming
- Language: Portuguese
- Format: Sports radio and new music

History
- Founded: 11 December 2025

Benfica FM is a Portuguese radio station owned by S.L. Benfica. The station started broadcasting on 11 December 2025 exclusively online. It plans to introduce FM frequencies thanks to an agreement with Bauer Media to use Batida FM's four-transmitter network (Lisbon and Porto), but, as of March 2026, the ERC—Portugal's communications regulator—has rejected it.

== History ==
S.L. Benfica announced in December 2017 that it would launch Benfica FM in 2018; for this end, it would also carry the exclusive rights to all of the team's home matches (at Estádio da Luz) exclusively on the network in 2018 and at least 2019, similar to what its television counterpart, Benfica TV, has been doing since 2013. With its launch, the team's audiovisual organization would suffer from a reshuffle of priorities. As of September 2018, the project lacked an ERC license.

Over time, the project was delayed several times and was thought as a digital project in 2020; then in June 2021, the station was already testing on the new Benfica Play platform in "pilot status". The station would become a full-fledged operation only if there would be enough revenue.

The idea resurfaced in June 2025, with the initial plan of launching the station during the 2025 FIFA Club World Cup, in which S.L. Benfica took part; by then, the studios were almost finished. On 9 July, S.L. Benfica requested an arrangement with ERC to sign an association agreement with Bauer Media to take over the Batida FM transmitter network (original station in Amadora plus relay stations Batida FM Moita, Batida FM Maia and Batida FM Cantanhede). The team registered the name Benfica FM instead of BFM (Benfica TV is branded BTV since 2013) to avoid allusions to the French network BFM Business. The license also stipulated that it would cover national and international sports news and dedicate airtime to music, especially from "new and emerging artists". ERC later rejected the proposal, but S.L. Benfica promised to obtain its FM frequencies.

On 11 December 2025, Benfica FM started broadcasting entirely online. The station opened at 19:04 (alluding to its year of founding) with Mais Vale Tarde as its inaugural program. Benfica vice-president José Gandarez told Record that the station had a long-term goal of becoming "self-sustaining and even generating positive results". The station broadcasts from the former Benfica TV room.
