= CNN Portugal =

Basic cable and satellite television news channel

- Country: Portugal
- Broadcast area: Portugal; Angola; Mozambique; Cape Verde
- Network: CNN

Programming
- Language: Portuguese
- Picture format: 1080i HDTV (downscaled to 16:9 576i for the SDTV feed)

Ownership
- Owner: Media Capital (licensed from Skydance)
- Sister channels: CNN International; TVI; V+ TVI; TVI Reality; TVI Internacional; TVI África

History
- Launched: 26 February 2009; 17 years ago
- Former names: TVI 24 (2009–2021)

Links
- Website: www.cnnportugal.pt

Availability

Streaming media
- Online stream: CNN Portugal Live (free)

Cable News Network Portugal, also known as CNN Portugal and abbreviated as CNN PT, is a Portuguese basic cable and satellite television news channel owned by Media Capital. It was launched on 26 February 2009 as TVI 24, the 24-hour news channel of the terrestrial network Televisão Independente. The network's name was then changed to CNN Portugal on 22 November 2021. Media Capital has a licensing agreement with the CNN Worldwide division of Skydance.

== History ==
=== As TVI 24 ===
The channel's original logo as TVI 24.

TVI 24 was on TVI's drawing board for several years, but plans for its official launch officially commenced in 2008. It was initially expected to launch on 20 February 2009, on TVI's anniversary; however, in late January, it was postponed to 26 February due to the Carnaval holidays. The network was then assigned channel 7 on most pay television lineups.

In 2011, José Alberto Carvalho became the director of the channel, as well as TVI's overall news director. TVI 24 then received a refresh on 9 January 2012 where it intended to be more competitive in the news space and affirmed itself as the largest multimedia news channel in Portugal.

With the change, all news blocks on the channel were rebranded as Notícias 24 except for programs like Discurso Direto, SOS24, 21ª Hora, 25ª Hora and 2ª Hora where, in addition to news updates, there were discussion, interactivity, and analysis components. Between 2015 and 2019, 21ª Hora was the main program of the channel, after which the Notícias 24 bulletin took its place. On weekdays, the journalists Ana Sofia Cardoso, José Alberto Carvalho, and Judite Sousa take turns presenting bulletins.

From 20 February 2017 and onward, the network's news programming was broadcast from a refreshed TVI news studio.

On 26 February 2021, 12 years after its launch, the channel introduced a new look, as well as new formats.

In 2022, in addition to its linear broadcast, an official CNN Portugal app was introduced, offering personalised news feeds, segmented notifications, featured videos and live streaming of the channel, as well as interactive features including a customizable news feed designed to enhance user engagement. The mobile platform was developed by the Portuguese technology company Magycal.

=== As CNN Portugal ===
On 24 May 2021, it was announced that Media Capital signed a memorandum of understanding for a licensing agreement with CNN. As a result, TVI 24 would be rebranded as CNN Portugal. The rebrand commenced on 22 November 2021.

== Ratings ==
In March 2022, CNN Portugal was the most-watched paid channel and the fourth most watched channel in Portugal with a share of 4.7%. CNN Portugal had dethroned crime and sensationalist news/generalist channel CMTV, which had been leading among paid channels for 62 months, but CMTV regained its lead again in the following month.

== Programming ==
- Novo Dia
- CNN Hoje
- CNN Meio Dia
- CNN Prime Time
- Agora CNN
- CNN Fim de Tarde
- CNN Desporto
- Jornal da CNN
- CNN Sábado
- CNN Domingo
