= Smooth FM (Portugal) =

Portuguese radio station

- Portugal
- Frequency: See list

Programming
- Format: Jazz

Ownership
- Owner: Bauer Media Group
- Sister stations: Rádio Comercial, M80 Radio, Cidade FM, Batida FM

History
- First air date: 21 September 2011

Links
- Webcast: Rayo
- Website: smoothfm.pt

Smooth FM is a Portuguese radio station that focuses on jazz and related music genres. It began broadcasting in 2011 by taking over part of the Best Rock FM transmitter network.

Smooth FM is operated by the Portuguese radio division of German media giant Bauer Media Group.

== History ==
In April 2011, Media Capital Rádios announced that, as part of a restructuring of its radio portfolio, it would replace Best Rock FM with Smooth FM, a jazz station, as early as June. Best Rock (101.1 Lisbon and 105.8 Porto) was witnessing low ratings; what MCR did was broaden the age range (ages 12-65) among its portfolio of networks. The new network marked MCR's entry into the jazz sector.

The network started broadcasting on 21 September 2011, in Lisbon on 103.0 (instead of 101.1 as initially planned) and in Coimbra on 92.8. Director Nuno Gonçalves described it as "a form of lifestyle", with varied playlists and "relevant content for its public".

In September 2018, it launched two theme radio stations playing soul and bossa nova tracks.

On 14 February 2020, marking Valentine's Day, Smooth FM dedicated the entire day to poetry and romantic music.

== FM frequencies ==
- 89.5 Porto
- 92.8 Coimbra
- 97.7 Santarém
- 96.6 and 103.0 Lisbon
