= Rádio Comercial =

Portuguese radio station

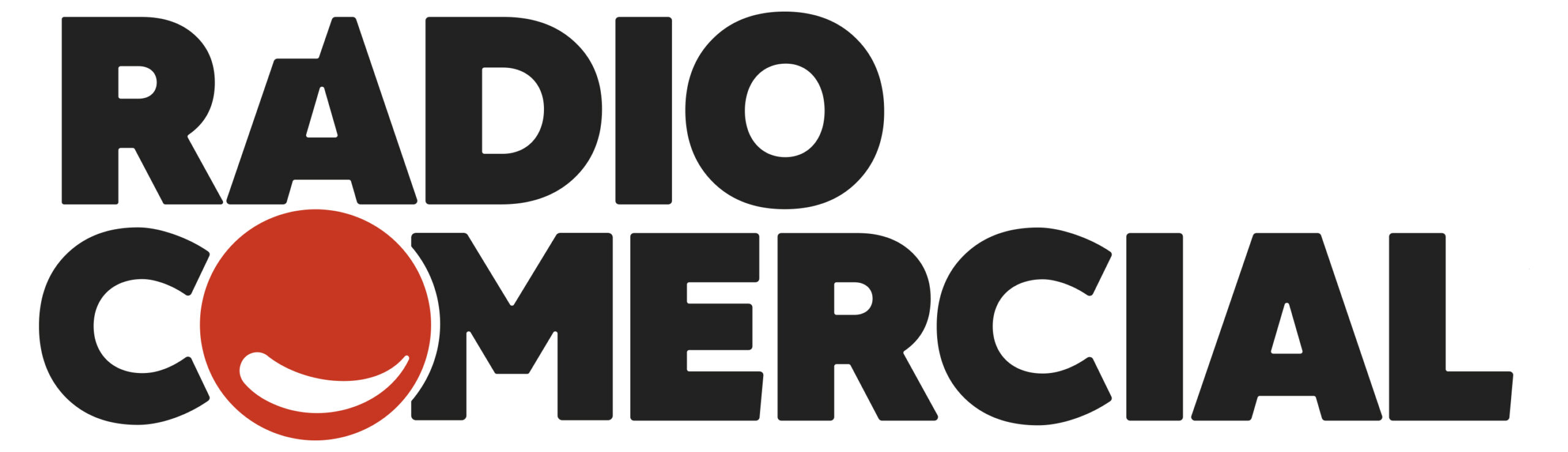
- Portugal
- Broadcast area: Portugal - National FM
- Frequencies: Several frequencies, change from geographical side to side See: Frequency

Programming
- Language: Portuguese
- Format: News, entertainment, hit music

Ownership
- Owner: Bauer Media Group
- Sister stations: Cidade FM; M80 Radio; Smooth FM; Batida FM

History
- First air date: 12 March 1979
- Former names: RDP Rádio Comercial (1979-1987)

Links
- Webcast: Rayo
- Website: www.radiocomercial.pt

Rádio Comercial is a commercial radio station in Portugal aimed at young people and adults. It has a broad format including contemporary, pop and rock music. It is among the most listened to radio stations in the country, being the overall leader in the RDP days and again at times since 2012.

== History ==
The station can trace its roots to Rádio Clube Português (RCP), a very important and influential station founded in 1930. RCP existed until 1975, when it was nationalized as part of the Carnation Revolution and subsequently swallowed into RDP. The FM network became RDP Programa 3 and the AM network, RDP Programa 4. Under RDP's control, it continued operating from its premises at Sampaio e Pina in Lisbon. João David Nunes was appointed as the network's director in 1978.

Rádio Comercial was born on 1 March 1979, without a formal schedule, though its date of birth is considered 12 March 1979, with full programming, as a subsidiary of Rádiodifusão Portuguesa, replacing the former RDP networks. The name was chosen because it was the only RDP station to allow adverts at the time, as well as to balance the management of the commercial and non-commercial stations RDP had. Its closure marekd the definitive end of the former Rádio Clube Português.

In the 1980s, the former Programa 3 was Comercial Onda Média, while the former Programa 4 was Comercial FM Estéreo. Comercial was in constant growth until the consolidation of local stations in the sector at the end of the decade. It was already leading the radio ratings in some sectors, largely due to its urban characteristics. Unlike Antena 1, which focused more on football, Rádio Comercial covered other sports that were easily ignored, such as tennis. In 1986, it was the first Portuguese station to use a helicopter for its traffic service.

The station was later privatized on 31 March 1993, to the Correio da Manhã newspaper, causing the shutdown by merger of Correio da Manhã Rádio, inheriting Rui Pego as its director. Pego recalls that the merger caused Presselivre to gain "17 transmitters and a headache".

In 1997, Presselivre decided to sell the station to Media Capital, acquiring a wasted radio station in the process. Expectation was high as the company hired Luís Montez, who had previously worked at Antena 3, XFM and Rádio Energia, as well as a one-month internship at Colombia's Radio Caracol, just before being appointed Comercial's director. After a series of tests, it was discovered that the 25-35 demographic favored rock music. From that time until 2003, the station focused on rock music. This lasted until 2002 when he was replaced by Pedro Tojal from RFM. The station was repositioned and the rock format moved to Best Rock FM, however Comercial's ratings were falling over time: in 2005, the BAREME ranking reported that Comercial scored a 9,5% share, less than half of RFM's 21,2%.

Under Pedro Ribeiro, Comercial stabilized; in November 2009, his team hired Nuno Markl, who returned after a five-year absence from MCR (he left Comercial when the network's morning show moved to Best Rock, after that, he moved to Antena 3 in 2004), with his Caderneta de Cromos segment in the mornings, triggering a rise in ratings. The success led to the creation of a live show in late 2010 and, subsequently, achieving leadership again in 2012.

In July 2018, Comercial started broadcasting from a new, visual-ready studio, and announced the creation of themed web radio stations. In 2022, the Media Capital Rádio group, which includes Rádio Comercial, was sold to Bauer Media Group.

== So Get Up and Rádio Comercial ==
During a one-year period from late 1992 to late 1993, the Greek-Californian artist Ithaka Darin Pappas, who lived in Lisbon for a six-year duration, hosted a small English-language segment on Rádio Comercial called Lounge Lizard Larry within the daily afternoon show, Quarto Bairro.

Quarto Bairro was produced by Eduardo Guerra and recorded by Pedro Costa (currently a DJ at Antena 3), with news by Sílvia Souto Cunha (present day editor of Visão Magazine). For the Lounge Lizard Larry sequences Ithaka would, for the most part, read his own poems, written specifically for the show, on top on B-side instrumental hip-hop tracks.

On one day in late 1992 at a café outside of the Rádio Comercial studios in the neighborhood called Amoreiras, Ithaka wrote a poem called, The End Of The Earth Is Upon Us and some minutes after completion read it live on top of a Naughty By Nature instrumental. A couple of months later, he recorded a demo of the song in Manchester, England with original music. And about eight months after that, the electronic music group Underground Sound of Lisbon, who had been hearing him read his writings on-air, invited him to rerecord The End Of The Earth Is Upon Us with their music for the B-side of a 12" vinyl single they were recording. Thru the decades the song, retitled So Get Up, has achieved a wide range of releases and remixes by international artists, but the original recording of the vocal-poem took place at Rádio Comercial in Amoreiras.

== Rádio Comercial Ucrânia ==
On 16 March 2022, over three weeks after the start of the Russian invasion of Ukraine, it launched a web-only station in Portuguese and Ukrainian, Rádio Comercial Ucrânia (also styled Радіо Комерсіал Україна). It targeted the Ukrainian diaspora already present in Portugal and new arrivals that came into Portugal as war refugees. In addition to a playlist of Ukrainian music and songs in Portuguese and English, it also produced its own podcasts and programming in Ukrainian, largely presented by Viktoriya Starchenko, who entered Portugal in 1998 when Ukraine was under high inflation. She presented the live morning show (08:00 to 11:00) alongside the Portuguese Marcos Fernandes.

== Team ==
Presenters

- Pedro Ribeiro
- Vera Fernandes
- Vasco Palmeirim
- Nuno Markl
- Diogo Beja
- Joana Azevedo
- Rita Rugeroni
- Ana Isabel Arroja
- Wilson Honrado
- João Paulo Sousa
- Ana Delgado Martins
- Marta Campos
- Tecas
- Pedro Andrade
- Renato Duarte
- Filipa Galrão

Staff

- João Pedro Sousa
- Nuno Luz
- Mário Rui
- Nuno Gonçalo
- Ana Margarida
- Ana Martins
- Margarida Moura
- Patrícia Pereira
- António Dias
- Cláudia Macedo
- Paulo Miranda
- Margarida Gonçalves

== Current presenters and shows ==
From Monday until Friday

Time	Show	Presenter
05:00-07:00		Pedro Andrade
07:00-10:00	Manhãs da Comercial	Pedro Ribeiro, Vera Fernandes, Nuno Markl and Vasco Palmeirim
10:00-13:00		Renato Duarte and Filipa Galrão
13:00-16:00		Tecas and Carolina Torres
16:00-19:00	Já se faz tarde	Diogo Beja and Joana Azevedo
19:00-22:00		Wilson Honrado
22:00-01:00		Ana Isabel Arroja
01:00-05:00		Without voiceover

Saturday

Time	Show	Presenter
00:00-02:00	The Weekend	Wilson Honrado
08:00-10:00	Enquanto houver estrada para andar	Pedro Ribeiro
10:00-13:00		Renato Duarte
13:00-16:00		Filipa Galrão
16:00-19:00		Vera Fernandes
19:00-22:00		Marta Campos
22:00-01:00	Hits In The Night	Pedro Andrade

Sunday

Time	Show	Presenter
01:00-02:00	The Weekend	Wilson Honrado
07:00-10:00		Pedro Andrade
10:00-11:00	Fast Forward	Vasco Palmeirim
11:00-14:00		Wilson Honrado
14:00-18:00		Tecas
18:00-20:00	TNT - Todos no Top	Mariana Pinto and André Penim
20:00-00:00		Ana Isabel Arroja

== Frequency (Rede Nacional de Emissores) ==
- Alcácer do Sal: 97.4 FM / 96.8 FM
- Aveiro: 90.8 FM
- Braga: 99.2 FM
- Bragança: 93.9 FM / 91.9 FM
- Beja: 92.0 FM / 88.1 FM
- Castelo Branco: 98.2 FM
- Coimbra: 90.8 FM
- Évora: 92.0 FM
- Faro: 96.1 FM / 88.1 FM
- Guarda: 96.1 FM
- Guimarães: 99.2 FM
- Leiria: 89.0 FM / 90.8 FM / 99.8 FM
- Lisboa: 97.4 FM
- Portalegre: 98.9 FM
- Porto: 97.7 FM
- Santarém: 99.8 FM / 97.4 FM
- Setúbal: 97.4 FM /96.8 FM
- Valença do Minho: 99.0 FM
- Vila Real: 88.9 FM
- Viseu: 88.7 FM / 90.8 FM

== See also ==
- Cidade
- M80 Radio
