= M80 Radio =

Radio station in Portugal and Spain

- Portugal
- Frequency: See list

Programming
- Language: Portuguese
- Format: Oldies

Ownership
- Owner: Bauer Media Group
- Sister stations: Rádio Comercial; Cidade FM; Smooth FM; Batida FM

History
- First air date: 2007

Links
- Webcast: Rayo
- Website: m80.pt

M80 Radio is a radio station in Portugal (and formerly also Spain) that plays music from the 1970s, 1980s, 1990s and 2000s.

== History ==
In Spain, the station began broadcasting on 18 January 1993 as Radio 80 Serie Oro. In 1994, the name was changed to M80. On 21 November 2018 at 6:40 CEST, M80 Radio stopped broadcasting in the country, and was replaced by Los 40 Classic.

In Portugal, it started broadcasting in 2007, in a project made from scratch, adapted to the Portuguese market. The station is owned by Bauer Media Group since 2022. Nuno Castilho de Matos was appointed as its director in January 2024.

== Frequencies ==
Frequencies in Portugal: M80 Rádio:

- Lisboa 104.3
- Porto/Matosinhos 90.0 FM
- Coimbra 98.4 FM
- Santarém 96.4 FM
- Braga/Fafe 103.8 FM
- Beja 106.4 FM
- Évora 106.4
- Faro 106.1 FM
- Leiria 93.0 FM
- Viseu/Penalva do Castelo 95.6 FM
- Portalegre 106.7 FM
- Portimão 107.1 FM
- Santiago do Cacém 107.5 FM
- Setúbal 104.3 FM
- Vila Real 97.4 FM
- Aveiro 94.4 FM
