= Leonor Poeiras =

Portuguese television presenter

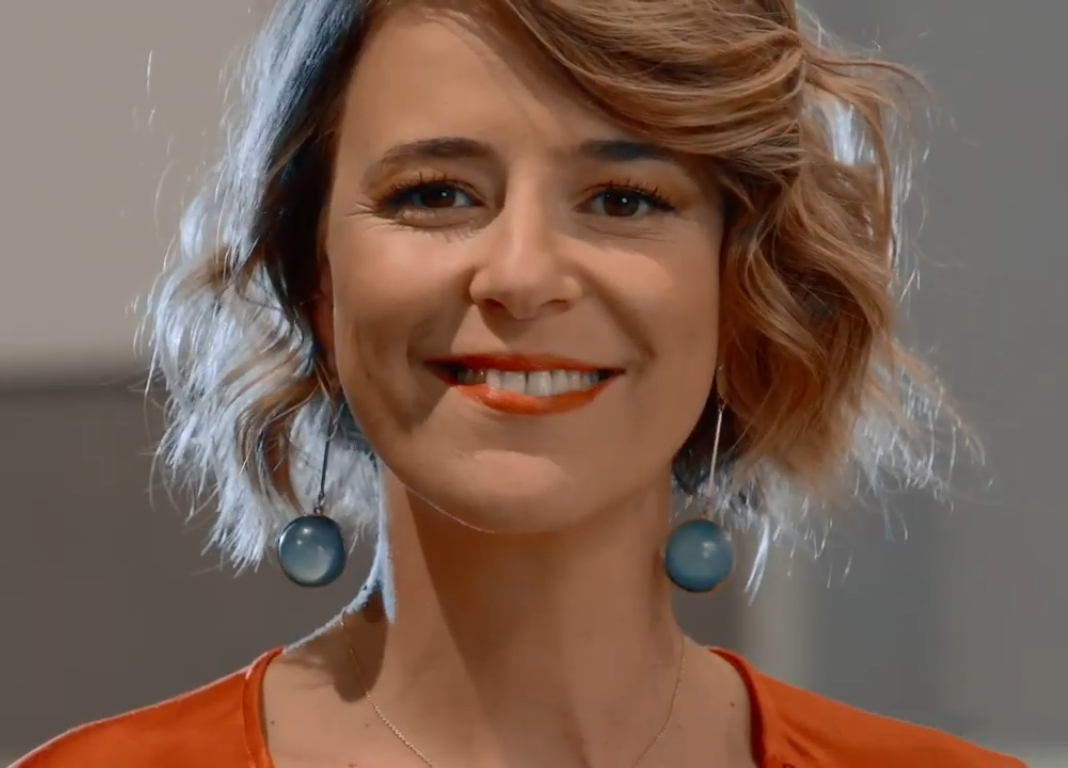
Leonor Poeiras

Leonor Poeiras is a Portuguese television presenter.
