= Manuel Marques =

Manuel Marques may refer to:

- Manuel Marques (Guge) (16th century - 1640s), a Portuguese missionary in India and Guge (Tibet)
- Manuel Marques (general) (1762–1824), governor of French Guiana during Portuguese occupation
- Manuel Marques (footballer) (1917–1987), Portuguese association footballer
