= XFM (Portugal) =

Defunct Portuguese alternative radio station

- Portugal
- Frequency: 91.6 MHz (Lisbon)

Programming
- Format: Indie

Ownership
- Owner: Lusomundo

History
- First air date: October 1993
- Last air date: 31 July 1997

XFM was an indie radio station in Portugal. Marketed as being "for an immense minority", the station started broadcasting in 1993 and shut down in July 1997 due to financial difficulties, creating a gap in the market and criticism from the listeners and presenters.

== History ==
The station started broadcasting in 1993 at the helm of TSF, which also obtained licenses for Rádio Energia. The station broadcast on 91.6 MHz in Lisbon and Porto on 105.8 MHz, though plagued by reception problems in some areas.

XFM was a sort of franchising of its British counterpart: its playlist frequently gave airtime to B-sides of singles, while the station's presenters had knowledge of the musical scene. Among the staff was António Sérgio, seen as a Portuguese John Peel.

In 1997, declining advertising support caused Lusomundo to shut down XFM, despite pressure from listeners and sponsors. Broadcasts ended on July 31; near midnight, the station aired Sérgio Godinho's Ser ou não ser as its final track.
