= Best Rock FM =

Portuguese radio station

- Portugal

Programming
- Format: Rock music

Ownership
- Owner: Media Capital

History
- First air date: 3 February 2003
- Last air date: November 2013

Best Rock FM was a Portuguese rock-formatted radio station owned by Media Capital. The network was created following the reformat of Rádio Comercial and had a reduced coverage. It shut down in 2013.

== History ==
Best Rock FM launched on 3 February 2003, coinciding with MCR's plan to reformat Rádio Comercial into a more open-formatted radio station. One of the key programs on Comercial, Programa da Manhã, which included the iconic Nuno Markl segment O Homem que Mordeu o Cão, moved to the new station (for most of its existence up until that point, it was on Rádio Comercial during its rock phase), causing criticism online and a flood of calls at Comercial on the first working day of the reformat, as the new station broadcast from a two-transmitter network covering only Lisbon and Porto.

The network observed a good growth in its ratings in its first year alone, rising from a 1,1% share in its first three months on air to 1,5% in the last quarter of 2003. The gradual increase was given to the gradual changes to its schedule, without changing from scratch. Markl left Best Rock FM on its own will in 2004, after Pedro Ribeiro left for the reformed Rádio Clube Português, disbanding the existing morning show. Station founder Pedro Tojal left MCR in December 2005.

In January 2011, it announced a restructuring plan for the station effective June, by creating a new brand and a new format to replace it. Without releasing further details, Media Capital Rádios announced that it would find a way to make all of its stations profitable, including Best Rock. During the first half of 2011, the station recorded a share of just 0.3%. MCR eventually announced that, on 21 September of that year, it would close Best Rock FM and replace it with jazz station Smooth FM, which corresponded to a segment MCR did not cover yet. The network continued operating a skeleton service until early November 2013, when its last remaining transmitter, 101.1 in Moita, started broadcasting Vodafone FM, putting a definitive end to its existence.
