= TVI África =

- Country: Angola; Mozambique

Ownership
- Owner: Media Capital
- Sister channels: TVI; V+ TVI; TVI Reality; TVI Internacional; CNN Portugal

History
- Launched: 3 October 2015
- Closed: June 2020

Links
- Website: www.tvi.iol.pt/africa

TVI África was a Portuguese television station owned and operated by Televisão Independente. The channel launched on 3 October 2015 on the DStv platform. Central to the launch of the channel was A Única Mulher, in which some of its actors went to Angola for the channel's launch party.

The channel's license was revoked on 31 December 2025.
