= Fátima Lopes =

Portuguese fashion designer

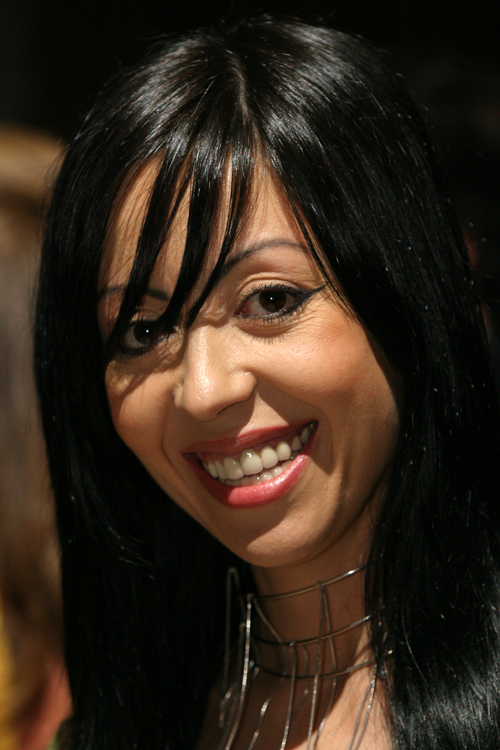
- Born: 8 March 1965 (age 61); Funchal, Madeira, Portugal
- Label: Fátima Lopes
- Spouse(s): Eduardo da Bernarda (m. 2003; div. 2010) Ângelo Rebelo (m. 2016; div. 2018) José Esteves Marcos (m. 2025)

Fátima Lopes, ComIH (born 8 March 1965) is a Portuguese fashion designer.

== Early life ==
Fátima comes from the Portuguese island of Madeira. She was born and grew up in its capital city, Funchal. Since an early age she showed an interest in fashion and during her adolescence, unhappy with what the shops had to offer in terms of clothing, started to design her own clothes. Being fluent in English, French and German, she worked as a tour guide for a local travel agency.

In 1990 Fátima moved to Lisbon, where she believed she could better pursue a career as a fashion designer. With a friend she opened a boutique named "Versos", which sold mainly clothes from international designers. In 1992 the boutique changed its name to "Fátima Lopes" and in that year the Fátima Lopes brand was born. In September of the same year, she participated in a fashion show made in an old convent in Lisbon (Convento do Beato), where her work was widely applauded.

In 1994 she exhibited her collection in Paris at the "Salon du Prêt-à-Porter Feminin". Two years later she opened her first international store in Paris, located in the famous rue de Grenelle. At the same time she began to diversify her collections by creating bags and shoes for both men and women.

In December 1998, she started the management of the model agency "FACE MODELS" in Lisbon.

In the year 2000 she caused a media sensation by appearing on a catwalk herself in Paris wearing the world's most expensive bikini, made out of gold and diamonds, with an estimated value of one million dollars. In 2003 she opened her first brand store in the United States, located in Melrose Avenue in the city of Los Angeles.

She worked on the design of the official suit of the 2006 Portuguese football World Cup team.
