= TVI Reality =

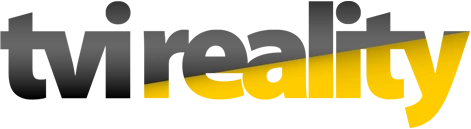
- Country: Portugal
- Broadcast area: Portugal

Programming
- Picture format: 16:9 (576i, SDTV)

Ownership
- Owner: Media Capital
- Sister channels: TVI; V+ TVI; TVI Internacional; TVI África

History
- Launched: 3 October 2015; 10 years ago

Links
- Website: TVI Ficção

TVI Reality is a Portuguese basic fiber and satellite television channel owned by Media Capital. It provides a sustaining feed of the current reality produced for the main TVI channel. The channel exists in its current form since 2015, while previous variations have existed as far back as 2001.

== History ==
The channel started broadcasting in September 2001 on TV Cabo as Canal 43/TVI Eventos, alongside the start of the third season of Big Brother, after a three-way agreement between TV Cabo, TVI and format producer Endemol. It was initially an encrypted channel available only on decoders. Sometimes, the channel was offered as a free preview at the beginning of certain editions. It continued until 2004.

On October 3, 2010, the channel's concept restarted exclusively on MEO, under the name TVI Direct, coinciding with the first season of Secret Story, available on channel 10. Additionally, the provider launched an interactive application with access to four additional cameras. Unlike TVI Eventos, TVI Direct was a basic channel. It was initially speculated that after Secret Story ended, it would carry other programs. Starting with its fifth season in 2014, its coverage was enlarged to include NOS and Vodafone. By October 2014, it became the second most watched cable channel, after Canal Hollywood.

The channel in its current form started broadcasting on 3 October 2015 exclusively on NOS, as part of a new agreement between TVI and the provider. Preliminary negotiations with MEO began in January 2016. In April 2020, broadcasts on MEO began.
