= Vodafone FM =

Portuguese radio station

- Portugal

Programming
- Format: Alternative music

Ownership
- Owner: Bauer Media Audio

History
- First air date: 26 January 2011

Vodafone FM was a Portuguese radio station owned by Bauer Media Audio (until 2022, Media Capital Rádios) in association with Vodafone Portugal, which provided the station with naming rights and synergies. The station shut down on 5 August 2023, being replaced by Batida FM, a project entirely backed by Bauer.

== History ==
Vodafone Portugal announced in December 2010 that it would launch the Vodafone FM network early next year. Seen as a pioneering project in European radio, it aimed to promote new artists and musical creation.

Broadcasts started at midnight on 26 January 2011, accompanied by a launch campaign on billboards in Lisbon and Porto and online. A casting process for potential presenters took place until 13 February. On 26 June 2011, its new website was distinguished by Awwwards.

On 19 December 2013, Vodafone FM started broadcasting to Coimbra on 103.0 MHz.

On 10 November 2021, Vodafone FM changed its music repertory to cater to a "younger and more wide-ranging" set of genres, such as R&B, indie pop, soft hip-hop and soul.

As of the May 2023 BAREME report, the station had a share of less than 1%.

On 4 August 2023, the partnership with Vodafone ended; from the following day, the station was rebranded Batida FM.
