= TVI Internacional =

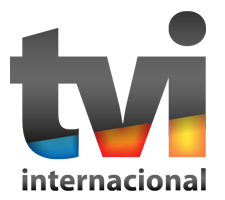
- Country: Portugal
- Broadcast area: Africa, Angola, Andorra, Asia, Cape Verde, Canada, France, Eastern Europe, Latin America, Luxembourg, Middle East, Mozambique, Monaco, Oceania, Spain, Switzerland, UK, United States

Programming
- Picture format: 16:9 (576i, SDTV)

Ownership
- Owner: Media Capital
- Sister channels: TVI; V+ TVI; CNN Portugal; TVI Reality; TVI África

History
- Launched: May 30, 2010; 16 years ago

Links
- Website: TVI

Availability

Terrestrial
- TDT (Andorra): Channel 25

TVI Internacional is the international television service of TVI. It is available in Europe, Africa, North America and Oceania. Programming is taken from the main channel as well as TVI 24 and original programming. As a leading channel producing Portuguese telenovelas, TVI started its international expansion as an exclusive to the Angolan ZAP satellite platform on May 30, 2010. In July 2011, it became available as a digital terrestrial television channel in Andorra. In the following year, it became available across cable services in Western Europe and North America.
