= Media Capital =

Media Capital SGPS SA
- Type: Private
- Traded as: Euronext Lisbon: MCP; Börse München: GQV
- Industry: Media
- Founded: 1992
- Headquarters: Oeiras, Portugal
- Key people: Mário Ferreira (chairman)
- Products: TV stations, radio stations, magazines, internet
- Owner: Pluris Investments, S.A. (37.05%); Triun, SGPS, S.A. (23%); Biz Partners (11.9725%); CIN – Corporação Industrial do Norte, S.A. (11.2%); Zenithodyssey, Lda. (10%)
- Website: Media Capital

Media Capital (MC) is a Portuguese media corporation founded in 1992 and the owner of TVI, the most watched TV channel in Portugal. MC also owns MCM (Media Capital Multimedia) which includes IOL, Plural Entertainment, Farol and Castello Lopes Multimedia.

== History ==
Media Capital group was established as a publisher of print media in 1992. In the following years, the Group acquired a number of publications that included the weekly newspaper that covered major political and business news “O Independente”.

In 1997, the group expanded its activity with the acquisition of two radios: Rádio Comercial and Nostalgia. It is in 1998 that the group acquires 30% of TVI and in 2000 creates its internet business: IOL.

The acquisition of NBP in 2001 consolidated the Group’s position in the television market as a whole, with a strong investment on the production of fictional contents in Portuguese. In 2003, Media Capital entered the movie distribution business (activity discontinued in the end of 2011) and, after acquiring Farol Música, became one of the major players in the music editing and record distribution business in Portugal.

The year of 2004 was marked by the preparation of the company for public quotation and subsequent listing of the company’s shares on Euronext Lisbon (closed on 30 March 2004). In November 2005, Grupo Prisa became the largest shareholder of Grupo Media Capital.

In 2008, Media Capital sold its press business unit to Progresa (also owned by Grupo Prisa) and, at the end of the year, acquired Plural Espanha that, along with NBP, originated Plural Entertainment, one of the major content producers in Portuguese and Spanish, thus reinforcing its investment in the production and distribution of differentiated quality contents.

In 2020, Prisa sells 30,22% of its participation to Mário Ferreira’s Pluris Investments for 10,5 million. Later that year, Prisa Group announces the selling of the rest of the company leaving MC.

In 2021, MC and CNN signed an agreement that leads to the creation of CNN Portugal.

In 2022, MC sold all its radios (Rádio Comercial, M80, Cidade FM, Smooth FM and Vodafone FM) for 69,6 million to Bauer Media Group. The main focus is now on the TV Broadcast market. This operation would reduce the MC debt from 79,9M to 21,2M and even a profit of 36,7M after a loss of 4,1M in the previous year.

== Businesses ==
Media Capital operates in several areas of media and advertising.

=== Broadcasting ===
- TVI, a television broadcaster. It was totally acquired by Media Capital in 1998.
- CNN Portugal (brand under license from Skydance Corporation and CNN Worldwide)
- V+ TVI
- TVI Reality
- TVI Internacional
- TVI África

=== Magazines ===
- Maisfutebol (Association football online magazine)

=== Internet ===
- IOL (Portugal), a multimedia content provider (formerly also an Internet service provider).

== Former units ==
=== Radio ===
Media Capital Rádios, a radio broadcaster, which includes several radio stations (sold to Bauer Media Group in February 2022):

- Rádio Comercial - national net of broadcasters:
  - 88.1 FM - Fóia (Monchique) → 10 kW
  - 88.7 FM - Lamego (Viseu) → 5 kW
  - 88.9 FM - Minhéu (Vila Real) → 10 kW
  - 89.0 FM - Leiria - Maunça → 1 kW
  - 89.3 FM - Esposende (Braga) → 0,4 kW
  - 90.8 FM - Lousã (Coimbra) → 44 kW
  - 91.9 FM - Bornes Mountains → 10 kW
  - 92.0 FM - Mendro Mountains (Beja district - also serving Évora's district) → 50 kW
  - 92.2 FM - Oliveirinha (Aveiro) → 0,2 kW
  - 93.9 FM - Samil - Bragança → 10 kW
  - 94.3 FM - Viseu → 0,5 kW
- 96.1 FM - Faro - São Miguel/Goldra → 10 kW
- 96.1 FM - Guarda/P. Vento → 10 kW
- 96.8 FM - Grândola → 10 kW
- 97.4 FM - Lisboa (Monsanto Forest Park) → 44 kW
- 97.7 FM - Porto (Monte da Virgem) → 44 kW
- 98.2 FM - Fundão (Gardunha Mountains) → 10 kW
- 98.5 FM - Sintra → 0,3 kW
- 98.9 FM - Portalegre (Marada Alta Mountains) → 10 kW
- 99.0 FM - Valença do Minho - Monte do Faro → 10 kW
- 99.2 FM - Braga (Sameiro) → 5 kW
- 99.8 FM - Montejunto Mountains → 10 kW
- 103.1 FM - Vouzela (Pena Hill) → 0,2 kW

- Cidade FM - ten local radio stations:
  - 91.6 FM - Lisboa → 5 kW
  - 97.2 FM - Redondo → 0.5 kW
  - 99.3 FM - Alcanena → 2 kW
  - 99.7 FM - Penacova (Coimbra) → 1 kW
  - 99.7 FM - Loulé (Faro district) → 2 kW
- 106.2 FM - Montijo → 1 kW
- 101.0 FM - Vale de Cambra (Aveiro) → 0.5 kW
- 102.8 FM - Viseu → 2 kW
- 104.4 FM - Braga (Amares) 104.4 FM → 1 kW
- 107.2 FM - Vila Nova de Gaia - Porto → 0.5 kW

- M80 Radio
  - 90.0 - Matosinhos (Porto)
  - 93.0 - Leiria
  - 95.6 - Penalva do Castelo (Viseu)
  - 96.4 - Santarém
  - 98.4 - Coimbra
  - 94.4 FM - Aveiro
  - 97.4 FM - Vila Real
- 104.3 - Lisbon and Setúbal
- 106.1 - Faro
- 106.4 - Beja and Évora
- 106.7 - Portalegre
- 107.1 - Portimão
- 107.5 - Grândola / Santiago do Cacém
- 103.8 - Braga and Fafe

- Vodafone FM
  - 107.2 - Lisbon Metro Area
  - 103.0 - Coimbra & Centre region
  - 94.3 - Porto Metro Area

- Smooth FM
  - 89.5 - Matosinhos - Porto
  - 92.8 - Figueiró dos Vinhos (Coimbra)
  - 96.6 - Lisbon
  - 97.7 - Santarém
  - 103.0 - Barreiro

=== Magazines ===
- Media Capital Edições, a magazine publisher:
  - Lux Magazine (women's magazine)
  - Maxmen (Portuguese version of Maxim men's magazine)
  - Portugal Diário (news magazine)
  - Agência Financeira (financial magazine)

=== Shut down stations ===
- Best Rock FM
  - 89.5 FM - Valongo
  - 101.1 FM - Moita

- Star FM
  - Benavente (Belmonte) 1035 AM
  - 96.6 FM - Lisboa
  - 105.8 FM - Porto
  - 96.8 FM - Sabugal

- 103.0 FM - Coimbra and Cantanhede
- 97.7 FM - Santarem
- 104.4 FM - Manteigas

- Cotonete, a web platform

== Ownership ==
As of 31st of December, Media Capital states that "the company has the following shareholders helding a participation of sharecapital and voting rights equal or superior than 5%": Pluris Investments, S.A. (37,05%), Triun, SGPS, S.A. (23%), Biz Partners (11.9725%), CIN – Corporação Industrial do Norte, S.A. (11.20%) and Zenithodyssey, Lda. (10%).
