= V+ TVI =

- Country: Portugal
- Broadcast area: Portugal; Angola; Mozambique; Europe

Programming
- Picture format: 16:9 (576i, SDTV)

Ownership
- Owner: Media Capital
- Sister channels: TVI; TVI Reality; TVI Internacional; TVI África

History
- Launched: October 15, 2012; 13 years ago
- Former names: TVI Ficção (2012-2024)

Links
- Website: TVI Ficção

V+ TVI, also known as V+, formerly TVI Ficção, is a Portuguese basic fiber and satellite television channel. It is owned by TVI. The channel broadcasts TVI originals, including telenovelas, sitcoms and series. It also broadcast a celebrity show (Câmara Exclusiva).

On 9 August 2024, TVI Ficção was reconstituted as V+, becoming a generalist channel.

The channel was created after an agreement between TVI and MEO, giving TVI Ficção an exclusivity contract with that platform. The channel is also available on unrelated platforms in Portuguese-speaking African countries, and across Europe.

== History ==
=== TVI Ficção ===
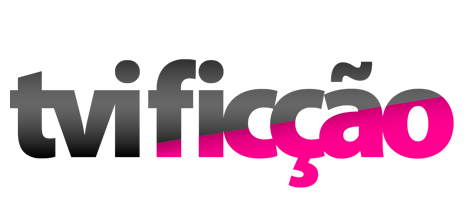
TVI Ficção logo used from 2012 to 2024.

On the 18th of March, 2020 the channel was launched by Portuguese operator NOS.

As of February 2021, TVI Ficção did not broadcast any content made exclusively for the channel; all of its content had already been broadcast by its free-to-air sister channel, TVI.

In March 2024, the scope of its programming increased, airing live events for the first time, such as UEFA Women's Champions League matches and in May, the FNAC Live festival.

The last program aired by TVI Ficção was A Única Mulher.

=== V+ TVI ===
In early July 2024, it was announced that the channel space used by TVI Ficção would be used by a new general interest channel, combining news and entertainment, competing against CMTV, by the end of 2024. Hugo Andrade was to be its director of programming.

On August 1, 2024, it was announced that the channel would be renamed V+ TVI, pronounced V+. The schedule includes commentary of Portuguese football matches, some original productions and two foreign series, Café con aroma de mujer (2021) from Colombia and Esperanza mía (2015) from Argentina. The rebrand coincided with the start of the 2024-25 Primeira Liga season, with V+ Futebol becoming its launch program.
