= Rádio Clube Português =

Radio station in Portugal

- Lisbon; Portugal
- Broadcast area: Lisbon

Programming
- Language: Portuguese

History
- Founded: 22 November 1931; 94 years ago
- First air date: 22 November 1931; 94 years ago (original); 1994; 32 years ago (relaunch); 12 April 2003; 23 years ago (second relaunch)
- Last air date: December 1972; 53 years ago (original); 1999; 27 years ago (relaunch); 2010; 16 years ago (second relaunch)

Rádio Clube Português was a Portuguese radio station founded on November 22, 1931, which existed in its initial form until 1975. Later, Rádio Clube was used as the name for a radio station owned by Grupo Media Capital.

== History ==
Rádio Clube Português, founded in 1931, was the result of the growth of Rádio Clube da Costa do Sol, CT1DY, owned by Jorge Botelho Moniz, an official at the Portuguese Army, who was part of the events of May 28, 1926 which led to the creation of the New State.

During the New State, RCP was a reference station. It was given exemption status from the authorities in 1937 to broadcast radio advertisements, which had been outlawed by other radio stations a few years earlier. In 1953, it required authorization to operate a network of television stations, which gave birth to Radiotelevisão Portuguesa (RTP). RCP was RTP's largest shareholder after the Portuguese state. In 1954, RCP was the first in Portugal to broadcast using frequency modulation, and in the next year, the first medium wave transmitter with power higher than 50 KW was activated in Miramar, Vila Nova de Gaia.

In early 1960, the move of Rádio Clube Português' main facilities from Parede (Cascais) to Lisbon led to profound changes in its operation. The decision was up to Alberto Lima Bastos, one of its founders. The main reasons were Lisbon being the center of Portugal's economy and the increase of Parede's urbanization, more than twenty kilometers from the capital, threatening the quality of its broadcasts.

The first communication from Movimento das Forças Armadas, broadcast on the early hours of April 25, 1974, was made at the microphones of the station, and in the outcome of the Carnation Revolution, the station adopted the motto Emissora da Liberdade (The Freedom Station).

RCP was nationalized in December 1975, becoming the third and fourth networks of RDP. Programa 3 was the commercial station with regional opt-outs using its former AM network and Programa 4 used its former FM network. Its frequencies in March 1979 started airing RDP Rádio Comercial.

Meanwhile, in the late 80s, Correio da Manhã Rádio, owned by Grupo Presslivre (Correio da Manhã), begins its operations in the Southern Regional Network it was granted the rights to operate.

In March 1993, the state decided to privatize Rádio Comercial and sold it to Presslivre. The group closes Correio da Manhã Rádio as a consequence, starting to relay Rádio Comercial Onda Média in the Southern Regional Network in its place. At the same time the broadcasts of Rádio Nostalgia began (on 103,0 MHz in Barreiro), a station airing music between the 60s and 80s.

In 1994, the Botelho Moniz family, in collaboration with the SONAE group, relaunched RCP, by means of a network of local radio stations. In this partnership, Rádio Nova and the defunct Memória FM broadcast to Lisbon. This partnership ended in 1999.

In 1996, Rádio Comercial started broadcasting the same schedule on both FM and AM, thus ending Rádio Comercial Onda Média. In the Southern Regional Network, Rádio Nostalgia took over. In 1997, Grupo Presslivre sold both Rádio Comercial and Nostalgia to the then-Grupo SOCI – Sociedade de Comunicação Independente – a business group that owned the former weekly O Independente (closed 2006), currently known under the name Media Capital.

On April 12, 2003, Media Capital changed the name and programming of Rádio Nostalgia, adopting the name Rádio Clube Português, following the same musical line of Rádio Nostalgia, but using the same brand as the former Rádio Clube Português. In 2006, as a result of internal reformulations at Media Capital, Rádio Clube Português was renamed Rádio Clube, with its programming changing to news and debates. New programs were announced for September 2007, in order to reach new audiences.

On July 8, 2010, due to the bad economic results of its activities, it was announced that Rádio Clube Português would shut down on July 11, the day of the 2010 FIFA World Cup final. Media Capital fired its 36 staff. From July 12 the station's format was replaced by an oldies format with three news bulletins. When the decision to close the station was announced, its staff was preparing for its new schedule in September, which never materialized. Media Capital on August 31 announced the creation of a new network to replace RCP, Star FM, using the existing frequencies. The new station took over on November 22.
