= Cidade FM =

Portuguese radio station

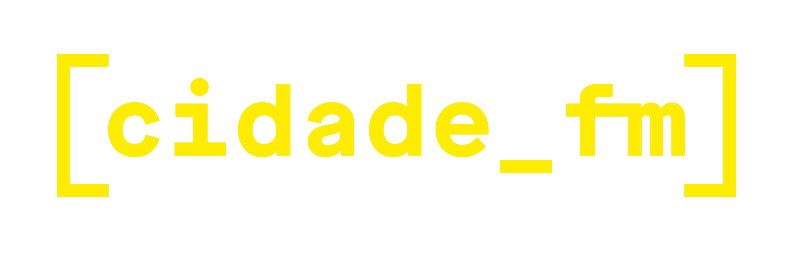
- Portugal
- Frequency: See list

Programming
- Format: Contemporary hit radio

Ownership
- Owner: Bauer Media Group
- Sister stations: Rádio Comercial, M80 Radio, Smooth FM, Batida FM

History
- First air date: 1 April 1986
- Former names: Rádio Cidade (1986-2003); Cidade (2014-2018)

Links
- Webcast: Rayo
- Website: cidade.fm

Cidade FM is a Portuguese radio station that focuses on international and national hits. Cidade targets the younger audience, 15-24.

Cidade is operated by the Portuguese radio division of German media giant Bauer Media Group, sister stations include: Rádio Comercial, Rádio Clube Português, Mix FM, Best Rock FM, Romântica FM, Smooth FM, Batida FM and M80.

== History ==
It was launched as pirate radio station, Rádio Cidade, using the model of the Jornal do Brasil-owned radio station in Rio de Janeiro of the same name, on 1 April 1986 in Amadora by Brazilian immigrants Rui Duarte, Rui Duarte Júnior and Edson Yazejy before it was suspended on 23 December 1988 at 9pm due to not having a legal licence. It became legal on 22 May 1989.

The station peaked its listenership in the mid-1990s when it became the second most listened radio station in Portugal, and soon expanded to several stations in Greater Lisbon, Greater Porto, Coimbra, Vale de Cambra, Santarém, Alentejo and Algarve, forming the Rede Cidade group. The expansion process started in 1992, first by obtaining a license for Porto, later in the Algarve. In 1998, the station surpassed Rádio Renascença's ratings in Lisbon.

Rede Cidade was bought by Media Capital in 1999 and changed its name to Cidade FM on 27 September 2003. The playout moved from Amadora to the MCR complex at Sampaio e Pina. The rebrand came after a marketing study showed that the Brazilian formula was already wasted and was reformated as a top-driven radio station for the 17-25 age range. As consequence, the six Brazilians working at the station were fired. The network was simply renamed Cidade in 2014. In June 2018 the radio station started to name itself Cidade FM again, while in February 2022, Media Capital sold their radio unit to Bauer Media Group.

== FM frequencies ==
- Cidade 91.6 Lisbon
- Cidade 107.2 Gaia (Porto)
- Cidade 99.7 Penacova (Coimbra)
- Cidade Ribatejo 99.3 Alcanena (Santarém)
- Cidade Viseu 102.8 Viseu
- Cidade Vale de Cambra 101.0 Vale de Cambra (Aveiro)
- Cidade Tejo 106.2 Montijo (Setúbal)
- Cidade Minho 104.4 Amares (Braga)
- Cidade Alentejo 97.2 Redondo (Évora)
- Cidade Algarve 99.7 Loulé (Faro)

== Hosts/DJs ==
Catarina Silva, João Pedro Pereira, Asize Topal, Artur Simões, Joana Miranda, Pedro Góias, Leonor Carvalho, Beatriz Pinto

Weekdays

- Já São Horas - (Catarina Silva and João Pedro Pereira)- das 7h às 11h
- Asize Topal (11h-16h)
- Toque de Saída (Artur Simões, Joana Miranda e Pedro Góias) - 17h às 20h
- Beatriz Pinto - 20h às 22h
- I Love Baile Funk (Fridays Only) - André Henriques - 23h à 1h00
