= Televisão Independente =

Portuguese television station

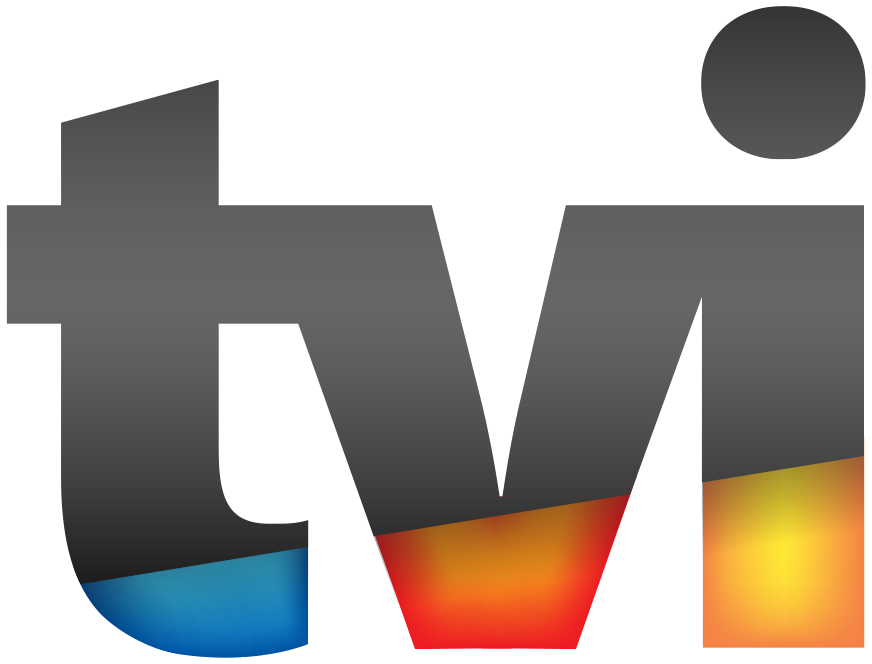
- Country: Portugal
- Broadcast area: Americas; Portugal
- Headquarters: Queluz de Baixo (Oeiras)

Programming
- Picture format: 1080i HDTV (downscaled to 576i for the SD feed)

Ownership
- Owner: Media Capital
- Sister channels: CNN Portugal; V+ TVI; TVI Reality; TVI Internacional; TVI África

History
- Launched: 20 February 1993; 33 years ago
- Former names: 4 (1993–1995)

Links
- Website: tvi.iol.pt

Availability

Terrestrial
- TDT: Channel 4 (SD)

TVI (Televisão Independente – "Independent Television") is Portugal's fourth terrestrial television channel, launched in 1993. It was the most watched channel in Portugal from 2005 to 2019, and again from 2024 to 2025. It competes directly with SIC and RTP1. It is one of the two private free-to-air channels in Portugal, among the seven terrestrial free-to-air channels broadcasting from the country.

== History ==
=== Plans for a television channel for the Church ===
The Catholic Church of Portugal demanded the end of the television monopoly in Portugal and wanted its channel as far back as the early 80s. At the time, there were only two television channels, RTP1 and RTP2, both owned by the state. In October 1981, Cardinal Patriarch of Lisbon António Ribeiro demanded the government to authorize the creation of an exclusive television channel for the church, under Article 41-4 of the Constitution of the Portuguese Republic, enabling freedom of education for any religion and the use of media for its activities. The plan for such a channel was greenlighted in January 1982, with consultancy from Luxembourgish television. If a plan to use separate frequencies failed, there was the hypothesis of renting airtime on RTP2. An amendment to the law was passed in February, with the government stressing the church's influence in Portuguese society. Observers of the visit of Pope John Paul II to Portugal planned for May 1982 believed that it was part of the campaign of the Church's bid for a television channel. An interview given by Bishop of Évora Maurílio Gouveia to the Catholic radio station Rádio Renascença believed that a channel owned by the Church was a step towards the creation of a more democratic society, having the right to own a TV channel, just like the right it had to own a radio station and a newspaper.

In 1986, with talks in government to limit government influence in media underway, the idea of a Church-owned channel gained momentum again.

=== Creation of TVI ===
The company was founded on 25 March 1991 by a group of 46 Catholic institutions, companies and businessmen, to receive the license for one of the two slots available for private television, that started in December 1990. It was one of the three shortlisted companies between 2 January and 2 April 1991. It also received support from the RTL Group and wanted to follow the example of the Dutch Catholic omroep KRO and Catholic-backed local television stations in northern Italy. Potential foreign investors were ruled out. By the summer of 1991, it was speculated that TVI would start broadcasting in September 1992. The total cost of operating was of six million contos, against eight million from TV1 and twelve million from SIC.

The project was greenlighted on 6 February 1992, as the fourth channel. The operative functions were divided between Cinema Berna, which housed the news operation, and the Altejo building, for the rest of the teams, both in Lisbon. The channel came out of an old claim (as far back as the 1980s) from the Portuguese Catholic Church, and that its initial aim was of being a "Christian-inspired television channel" with a charter of principles defining it as "a moral and cultural enterprise". When the channel gained its license, the channel had withdrawn from its key characteristic of being "the Church's channel".

Priest Vitor Melícias, who despite having a daily slot on the channel (Encontro), was never aligned with the project, as he preferred that the channel would include what would eventually be called "civil society": religious entities, unions, universities and other institutions. Melícias believed that the project was "utopian" whose limitations were faced further by "pressure from viewers and addictions from the staff".

=== Early years, financial troubles ===
TVI was the second private Portuguese TV channel to be launched, SIC having been launched five months before, and the fourth channel in all. Already under the name TVI, but marketed as 4, in which the '4' was the sole element in its logo, TVI was initially owned by some prominent Catholic Church institutions, including Rádio Renascença, RFM, Universidade Católica Portuguesa, Público, Editorial Verbo and União das Misericórdias; Antena 3 Televisión (which consisted of La Vanguardia, ABC-Prensa Española, Manuel Martín Ferrand (4.3%), Rafael and Manuel Jiménez de Parga, Europa Press and Grupo Zeta), the Luxembourgish Compagnie Luxembourgeoise de Télédiffusion, (CLT, now RTL Group), Sonae, the Scandinavian SBS Broadcasting Group and ITV contractor Yorkshire Television were minor stakeholders of TVI. The shareholder structure was also subdivided in many individual personal shareholders. This majority-Catholic ownership pushed TVI's programming in the direction of Christian values. In the first years of its existence, TVI assumed the role of an 'alternative' television broadcaster, dedicating segments of its airtime to distinct target audiences, with part of the morning dedicated to housewives and the elderly and part of the afternoon to the young. Broadcasts were initially experimental, before upgrading to regular status in October the same year.

The first test broadcasts were conducted on 30 January 1993. 40% of the programming output was set to be national, with the remaining 60% being imports.

TVI launched on 20 February 1993, with a special five-and-a-half-hour schedule. The evening began at 8pm with a special program introducing the contents of the channel, followed by the film The Natural (at the time, it was normal for Portuguese terrestrial television to air movies during primetime). The first commercial seen on the network, likely representing the essence of the channel, was for Halls Mentholyptus, where a monk of a church choir had a sore throat. The main news, Informação 4, went live exceptionally later at 10:50pm.

TVI's initial schedule was built primarily by international feature films, with a selection from Lauro António, some foreign television series and a substantial amount of national production. Notable early national productions included Telhados de Vidro, the first telenovela made for a private television station in Portugal, the children's program A Casa do Tio Carlos hosted by Carlos Alberto Moniz, which aired on Sunday mornings, and the Portuguese sitcom Cos(z)ido à Portuguesa on Tuesdays, with Florbela Queiroz.

José Nuno Martins was the first director of programs. Interference of the Catholic Church in the channel's content was at its whole, the aim was to "build a stable station with very familiar programming", but was plagued by difficulties, such as no reception in parts of Lisbon during the channel's first weeks, "extremely violent efforts" from the professionals and "nonsensical management options" given to an "amateur administration". Friars, nuns and other individuals became shareholders of the channel, expecting a return of their money. In its first year, TVI had a share of 6.6%.

Among its earlies scandals was, in March 1993, its refusal of covering a trial of a Catholic father (Frederico) for murder and homosexual relations with a minor.

In 1994, TVI begins to experience its first signs of crisis that followed in the coming years. In the following year, Rádio Renascença and the Catholic Church withdrew much of their shares from the channel, selling them to a British pensioners' fund. The channel's finances deteriorate, in an advertising market that was seen as "too small" for four channels, it was hard for the channel to receive ad revenue. Despite the entrance of foreign investors, the channel wanted to remain faithful to its founding charter of principles, but, on the other hand, wanted a more attractive schedule to gain ad revenue. Such hesitation between the two formulas turned out to be fatal.

During this period, TVI was known for its American series and movies, including X-Files and Baywatch, and most notably the Spanish show El gran juego de la oca (translated as O Jogo do Ganso) and Farmacia de Guardia imported from Antena 3. The agreement with Antena 3, which was seen as a way to mimic SIC's agreement with Globo, fell through when Banesto experienced a financial scandal. Because of that, the line-up changed again to a more low-cost offering, reducing the amount of national content and emphasizing more on imports, especially foreign television series, as a cheaper option. 1996 was marked by the entry of Carlos Cruz as its director of programming, with the goal of trying to achieve an expected 15% share. TVI also brought in some prominent names in Portuguese television, including Manuel Luís Goucha and Artur Albarran, but the viewing figures had were always lower than expected – higher than RTP2 but lower than the top 2 channels then, SIC and RTP1 – and it entered into deep financial crisis in 1997.

=== Lusomundo, Stanley Ho, and Cisneros ===
New administration took over in June 1998. Nineteen Catholic institutions that had supported the channel since its founding all left. TVI was taken over by a consortium led by Sonae, Lusomundo and Grupo Cisneros, who overtook the bids by Media Capital and Antena 3, the latter being a former part-owner. Antena 3 Televisión had agreed to subscribe (50% with its Portuguese partner) an increase in capital of 1,300 million pesetas, to ensure control of the channel, which at the time had exclusive of the Spanish Soccer League. The presence of Cisneros caused a political affair, where opposition leader Marcelo Rebelo de Sousa assured that the consortium has been benefited by the government to reduce TVI's debt interest.

=== Media Capital; on track for leadership ===
TVI's recovery happened when it was totally acquired by Media Capital between 1997 and 1999, one of the most important media conglomerates in Portugal, whereupon it started broadcasting more Portuguese-produced programs, including soap operas.

In March 1999, TVI hired José Eduardo Moniz, former director of RTP. His arrival prompted a change in the programming line, with continuous strategies aiming at attracting audience from other channels. After some experiments with pimba music concerts on specific dates, the channel had the task to premiere a program hosted by Miguel Sousa Tavares on 29 April, aiming at another audience, whose name at the time was still kept in secret. The program was promoted without directly referring its name or contents, but reflected the complicated relations Moniz and Tavares had. Moreover, TVI used the late afternoon slots to premiere an hour-long program, Nossa Gente, produced by D&D Audiovisuais, emphasizing on people with unusual hobbies. For that year's Easter week, TVI reserved its schedule for foreign mini-series. The year ended with TVI revealing itself as the only television channel whose share grew in double digits, citing the success of its national productions, including Todo o Tempo do Mundo, whose average share alone exceeded 30% on weekends, with more than a million viewers tuning in. For 2000 it was revealed that the budget and programming offer would increase considerably. The channel hired Carlos Ribeiro, who hosted Made in Portugal, to make a similar program related to the Portuguese popular music scene in the first trimester of the new year. Marina Mota was also signed, who came from SIC, and was set to premiere her first production on the channel in March. Such growth in ratings and ad revenue consolidated TVI's position as "the great surprise station" of Portugal.

=== Achieving top ratings for the first time ===
This helped to increase its audience significantly, but it was in September 2000, when Big Brother started, that the channel gained a boost in popularity. The once 3rd-ranked (by 2000) TVI went on to surpass RTP1 for second place in 2001 and four years later, defeated SIC to take first place, which it maintained for 14 consecutive years before losing it once more to SIC in 2019.

With the premiere of Big Brother on 3 September 2000, the channel introduced a new logo, facing a ratings war with SIC. TVI's rebrand was seen as an opportunity to renew its image, to counter SIC's strategies. The new logo was a clear sign of the war with SIC: a golden, stylized lowercase i mark surrounded by a red and blue ring. The ring iconography used by both channels represented the viewing audience, watching the station. The channel adopted a permanently-moving channel bug, representing the "permanent change" on the channel's behalf to satisfy the viewing public. The main news moved to 8pm in an attempt to boost ratings.

The channel's eighth anniversary was observed without great ceremony, but had a special edition of Batatoon and the premiere of a new telenovela, Olhos de Água. Regarding the Christian principles that once dominated the channel, Monteiro Coelho affirmed that they were still in use as "respect, freedom and exemption that even non-Catholics follow". These obligations with the Church fell due to lack of internal changes for such. The staff in 2001 stood at 330, up from 200 in 1993.

Currently, TVI is known for having a large number of national reality shows and soap operas. It broadcasts a mix of local productions, such as soap operas, family series and reality shows, news programs and international movies and series (mostly American). It is currently owned by Media Capital, which is owned by Pluris Investments, S.A., it was previously owned by Grupo Prisa from 2005 until 2020. Until February 2007, Media Capital was co-owned by RTL Group and Grupo Prisa. The station works with Media Capital-owned production company Plural Entertainment to produce its national fictional content.

Like public service broadcaster RTP and unlike commercial rival SIC, which have always shown foreign programs in the original language with subtitles, TVI tried, unsuccessfully, to dub foreign programs into Portuguese after achieving marginal success with Latin American Spanish-language soap operas dubbed in Brazilian Portuguese. Experiments of dubbing included the US series Dawson's Creek and other shows directed at younger audiences.

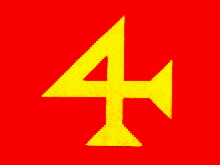
TVI's first logo, used from 1993 to 1995

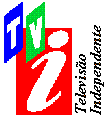
TVI's second logo, used from 1995 to 1996

TVI's third logo, used from 1996 to 2000

TVI's fourth logo, used from 2000 to 2017

== Criticism ==
In July 2010, TVI censored a kiss between two male characters on the youth TV series Morangos com Açúcar, due to pressure by a fundamentalist far-right organization, "National Resistance". This cut has led to a major outcry, and has been widely perceived as an occurrence of homophobia. At least 10 civil society organizations called for the reinstatement of the cut scene. As of 2015, TVI no longer censors homosexual scenes and has become an important symbol of it in Portugal.

TVI had still broadcast in 4:3 as of 2015, even though, on its early days, it received European funds to promote and broadcast in 16:9 PAL-plus. However, the network's board of directors announced in September 2015 that its channels will move to the widescreen format, starting with the premiere of Santa Bárbara on 28 September and finalizing the move on 3 October, one day before the general elections.

Some viewers criticized the channel as it broadcasts US television series after midnight. TVI's prime time is reserved for in-house programming, mainly soap operas, viewer-participation quizzes and reality shows, in a similar manner to its direct competitor SIC.

== Programs ==
=== National ===
==== Soap operas currently airing ====
- Festa é Festa – Party is party
- Para sempre – Forever
- Quero é Viver – I Want to Live

==== Previous soap operas ====
- Ouro Verde – " Green Gold " – (Telenovela) 2017–2017
- A Impostora – " The Impostor " – (Telenovela) 2016–2017
- Santa Bárbara – Saint Barbara (Telenovela) 2015–2016
- A Única Mulher – The Only Woman (Telenovela) 2015–2017

==== TV series ====
- Massa Fresca – Fresh Pasta

==== News ====
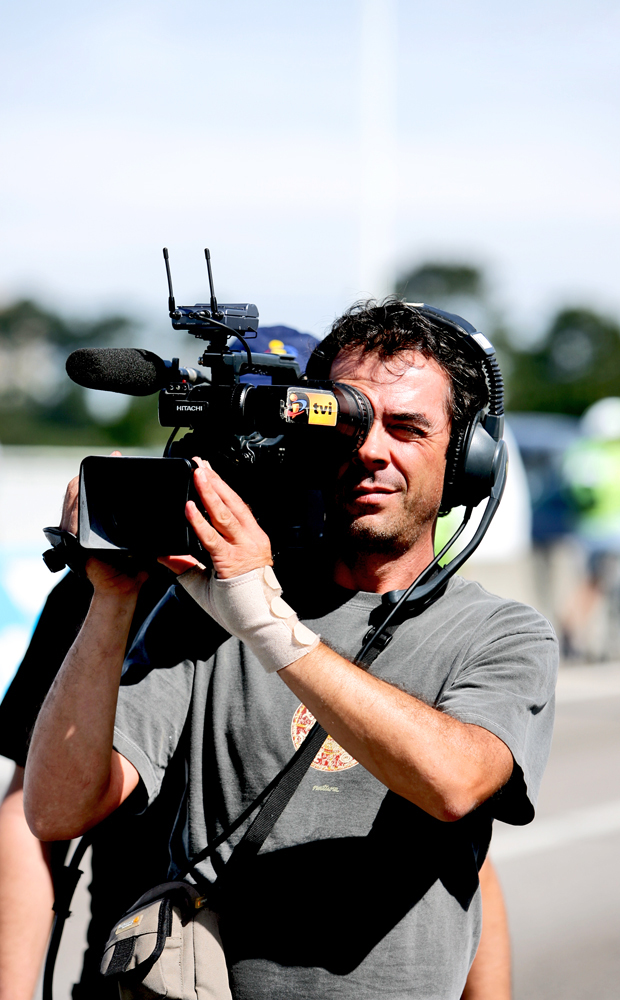
TVI cameraman

- Diário da Manhã – Morning Diary
- TVI Jornal – TVI News
- Jornal Nacional – National News

==== Talent shows ====
- A Tua Cara Não Me É Estranha 4 – Your Face Sounds Familiar 4

==== Reality shows ====
- Secret Story: Desafio Final 4
- Big Brother
- A Quinta

==== Talk shows ====
- Goucha – Goucha
- Dois às 10– two at ten
- Somos Portugal – We're Portugal

=== International ===
==== Series currently airing ====
- Hawaii Five-0
- Chicago Fire

==== Movies ====
Movies from the following studios/distributors:

- Warner Bros Pictures/New Line Cinema (rights co-shared with RTP and SIC)
- Paramount Pictures/DreamWorks Pictures (rights co-shared with SIC)
- 20th Century Fox/Regency Enterprises (rights co-shared with RTP and SIC)
- Universal Studios/Focus Features (rights co-shared with RTP and SIC)
- DreamWorks Animation

=== Sports ===
- UEFA Champions League
- UEFA Super Cup

=== Other ===
- Sunday Eucharist and 8° Dia (8th Day) – Sunday Christian Catholic mass and religious show broadcast on Sundays, before the lunchtime news block.
- Cartaz das Artes (Arts' Poster) – weekly cultural agenda show, displayed in the first hours of Friday, hosted by João Paulo Sacadura.
- EuroMillions – the lottery draw that gives its name to the show, is broadcast on Tuesdays and Fridays after News at Eight.
