= Golden Globes (Portugal) =

Art and entertainment awards

- Current: 2023 Golden Globes (Portugal)
- Awarded for: Excellence in different areas
- Location: Coliseu dos Recreios, Lisbon
- Country: Portugal
- First award: 8 April 1996; 30 years ago

Highlights
- Most awards: Cristiano Ronaldo (11)
- Website: globosdeouro.pt

Television/radio coverage
- Network: SIC, SIC Caras
- Produced by: SIC, Caras

The Golden Globes (Portuguese: Globos de Ouro) are awards given each year in Portugal since 1996 by the Golden Globes Academy, made up by professionals of SIC TV and Caras magazine, which award several areas of art and entertainment in the country, with theatre, sports, cinema, fashion and music.

== Ceremonies ==
Edition	Date	Venue	Hosts
I	8 April 1996	Coliseu dos Recreios	Catarina Furtado
II	7 April 1997	Coliseu dos Recreios	Catarina Furtado
III	5 April 1998	Coliseu dos Recreios	Catarina Furtado
IV	11 April 1999	Coliseu dos Recreios	Catarina Furtado
V	2 April 2000	Coliseu dos Recreios	Catarina Furtado
VI	8 April 2001	Coliseu dos Recreios	Catarina Furtado
VII	5 May 2002	Coliseu dos Recreios	Catarina Furtado and Herman José
VIII	30 May 2003	Coliseu dos Recreios	Catarina Furtado, Herman José and Fátima Lopes
IX	24 May 2004	Coliseu dos Recreios	Herman José, Sílvia Alberto and Fátima Lopes
X	17 April 2005	Coliseu dos Recreios	Herman José, Sílvia Alberto and Fátima Lopes
XI	21 May 2006	Praça de Touros do Campo Pequeno	Bárbara Guimarães
XII	1 April 2007	Praça de Touros do Campo Pequeno	Bárbara Guimarães
XIII	11 May 2008	Coliseu dos Recreios	Bárbara Guimarães
XIV	17 May 2009	Coliseu dos Recreios	Bárbara Guimarães
XV	23 May 2010	Coliseu dos Recreios	Bárbara Guimarães
XVI	29 May 2011	Coliseu dos Recreios	Bárbara Guimarães
XVII	20 May 2012	Coliseu dos Recreios	Bárbara Guimarães
XVIII	19 May 2013	Coliseu dos Recreios	Bárbara Guimarães
XIX	18 May 2014	Coliseu dos Recreios	Bárbara Guimarães
XX	24 May 2015	Coliseu dos Recreios	Bárbara Guimarães
XXI	15 May 2016	Coliseu dos Recreios	Bárbara Guimarães
XXII	21 May 2017	Coliseu dos Recreios	João Manzarra
XXIII	20 May 2018	Coliseu dos Recreios	César Mourão
XXIV	29 September 2019	Coliseu dos Recreios	Cristina Ferreira
XXV	3 October 2021	Coliseu dos Recreios	Clara de Sousa
XXVI	2 October 2022	Coliseu dos Recreios	Clara de Sousa
XXVII	1 October 2023	Coliseu dos Recreios	Clara de Sousa
XXVIII	29 September 2024	Coliseu dos Recreios	Clara de Sousa
XXIX	28 September 2025	Coliseu dos Recreios	Clara de Sousa
XXIX	26 September 2026	Coliseum of Recreations	

== Categories ==
=== Active ===
==== Cinema ====
Year	Best Film		Best Director		Best Actress		Best Actor	
Year	Film	Director	Director	Film	Actress	Film	Actor	Film
1996	Adam and Eve	Joaquim Leitão	Joaquim Leitão	Adam and Eve	Maria de Medeiros	Adam and Eve	Joaquim de Almeida	Adam and Eve
1997	Five Days, Five Nights	José Fonseca e Costa	Manoel de Oliveira	Party	Inês de Medeiros	Pandora	Diogo Infante	Dying to Go Home
1998	Temptation	Joaquim Leitão	Joaquim Leitão	Temptation	Ana Zanatti	Porto Santo	Joaquim de Almeida	Temptation
1999	J Zone	Leonel Vieira	Manoel de Oliveira	—N/a	Ana Bustorff	Black Shoes and Zona J	Diogo Infante	Sweet Nightmare
2000	Jaime	António Pedro Vasconcelos	António Pedro Vasconcelos	—N/a	Ana Bustorff	—N/a	Vitor Norte	—N/a
2001	April Captains	Maria de Medeiros	Manoel de Oliveira	—N/a	Maria de Medeiros	April Captains	Vítor Norte	Too Late
2002	I'm Going Home	Manoel de Oliveira	—N/a	—N/a	Rita Blanco	Get a Life	Joaquim de Almeida	A Samba for Sherlock
2003	The Forest	Leonel Vieira	—N/a	—N/a	Alexandra Lencastre	The Dauphin	Vítor Norte	Light Drops
2004	Quaresma	José Álvaro Morais	—N/a	—N/a	Beatriz Batarda	Quaresma	Nicolau Breyner	The Immortals
2005	In the Darkness of the Night	João Canijo	—N/a	—N/a	Beatriz Batarda	The Murmuring Coast	Nicolau Breyner	Kiss Me
2006	Alice	Marco Martins	—N/a	—N/a	Ana Moreira	Adriana	Nuno Lopes	Alice
2007	Blood Curse	Tiago Guedes e Frederico Serra	—N/a	—N/a	Isabel Ruth	Vanitas	José Afonso Pimentel	Blood Curse
2008	Call Girl	António Pedro Vasconcelos	—N/a	—N/a	Soraia Chaves	Call Girl	Ivo Canelas	Call Girl and The Mystery of Sintra Road
2009	Our Beloved Month of August	Miguel Gomes	—N/a	—N/a	Sandra Barata Belo	Amália	Nuno Lopes	Goodnight Irene
2010	Doomed Love	Mário Barroso	—N/a	—N/a	Catarina Wallenstein	Eccentricities of a Blonde-Haired Girl, Doomed Love and Salazar: The Private Life	Rui Morrison	Vacances portugaises
2011	Mysteries of Lisbon	Raúl Ruiz	—N/a	—N/a	Maria João Bastos	Mysteries of Lisbon	Adriano Luz	Mysteries of Lisbon
2012	Blood of My Blood	João Canijo	—N/a	—N/a	Rita Blanco	Blood of My Blood	Nuno Melo	The Baron
2013	Tabu	Miguel Gomes	—N/a	—N/a	Dalila Carmo	Florbela	Nuno Lopes	Lines of Wellington
2014	It's Love	João Canijo	—N/a	—N/a	Rita Blanco	The Glided Cage	Pedro Hestnes	Second Hand
2015	Os Maias	João Botelho	—N/a	—N/a	Maria do Céu Guerra	Cats Don't Have Vertigo	Filipe Duarte	The Invisible Life
2016	Arabian Nights	Miguel Gomes	—N/a	—N/a	Victoria Guerra	Impossible Love	José Mata	Impossible Love
2017	Letters from War	Ivo Ferreira	—N/a	—N/a	Ana Padrão	Game of Checkers	Nuno Lopes	An Outpost of Progress
2018	Saint George	Marco Martins	—N/a	—N/a	Rita Blanco	Fatima	Nuno Lopes	Saint George
2019	Rage	Sérgio Tréfaut	—N/a	—N/a	Isabel Ruth	Rage	Carloto Cotta	Diamantino
2021	The Domain	Tiago Guedes	—N/a	—N/a	Lúcia Moniz	Listen	Albano Jerónimo	The Domain
2026	Night Passengers (Entroncamento)	Pedro Cabeleira	—N/a	—N/a	Ana Vilaça	Night Passengers	Sérgio Coragem	The Laughter and the Knife (O Riso e a Faca)

==== Fiction ====
Year	Best Project		Best Actress		Best Actor	
Year	Project	Producer(s)	Actress	Project	Actor	Project
2021	Esperança	Pedro Varela	Maria João Abreu	Golpe de Sorte	Ricardo Pereira	Amor Amor

==== Music ====
Year	Best Individual Singer		Best Group		Best Song	
Year	Singer	Album	Group	Album	Song	Performer
1996	Dulce Pontes	—N/a	Delfins	—N/a	Sou como um Rio	Delfins
1997	Luís Represas	—N/a	Delfins	—N/a	Se eu fosse um dia o teu olhar	Pedro Abrunhosa
1998	Paulo Gonzo	—N/a	Madredeus	—N/a	Jardins Proibidos	Paulo Gonzo
1999	Rui Veloso	—N/a	Silence 4	—N/a	Todo o tempo do mundo	Rui Veloso
2000	Sara Tavares	—N/a	Ala dos Namorados	—N/a	Solta-se o Beijo	Ala dos Namorados
2001	Camané	—N/a	Silence 4	—N/a	Sopro do Coração	Clã
2002	João Pedro Pais	—N/a	Santamaria	—N/a	Não Há	João Pedro Pais
2003	Carlos do Carmo	Nove Fados e uma Canção de Amor	Madredeus	Euforia and Electrónico	Momento – Uma espécie de Céu	Pedro Abrunhosa
2004	Rui Veloso	—N/a	Mesa	—N/a	Carta	Toranja
2005	Rodrigo Leão	—N/a	Da Weasel	—N/a	Re-Tratamento	Da Weasel
2006	Mariza	Transparente	Blasted Mechanism	Avatara	Princesa	Boss AC
In 2007, a change has occurred in the subcategories.
Ano	Best Individual Singer		Best Group		Personality of the Year	
Ano	Singer	Song	Group	Song	Personality of the Year	
2007	Sérgio Godinho	—N/a	The Gift	—N/a	Mickael Carreira	
In 2008, a change has occurred in the subcategories.
Ano	Best Individual Singer		Best Group		Best Newcomer	
Ano	Singer	Album	Group	Album	Performer	Album
2008	Jorge Palma	Voo Nocturno	Da Weasel	Amor, Escárnio e Maldizer	Mundo Cão	Mundo Cão
2009	Mariza	Terra	Buraka Som Sistema	Black Diamond	Deolinda	Canção ao Lado
In 2010, a change has occurred in the subcategories.
Year	Best Performer		Best Group		Best Song	
Year	Performer	Album	Group	Album	Song	Performer
2010	Ana Moura	Leva-me aos Fados	Xutos & Pontapés	30 Anos à Nossa Maneira	Gaivota	Hoje
2011	Aurea	Aurea	Deolinda	Dois Selos e Um Carimbo	O Amor É Mágico	Expensive Soul
2012	Jorge Palma	Com Todo o Respeito	Amor Electro	Cai o Carmo e a Trindade	A Máquina	Amor Electro
2013	Carminho	Alma	Expensive Soul	Syphonic Experience	Desfado	Ana Moura
2014	Gisela João	Gisela João	Deolinda	Mundo Pequenino	Para os Braços da Minha Mãe	Pedro Abrunhosa with Camané
2015	António Zambujo	Rua da Emenda	Dead Combo	A Bunch of Meninos	Pica do 7	António Zambujo
2016	Agir	Leva-me a Sério	D.A.M.A	Dá-me um Segundo	Dia de Folga	Ana Moura
2017	Carminho	Carminho Canta Tom Jobim	Capitão Fausto	Capitão Fausto Têm os Dias Contados	O Amor é Assim	HMB with Carminho
2018	Raquel Tavares	Roberto Carlos por Raquel Tavares	HMB	Mais	Amar pelos dois	Salvador Sobral
From 2019, a change has occurred in the subcategories.
Year	Best Performer		Best Live Act		Best Song	
Year	Performer	Album	Performer		Song	Performer
2019	Capitão Fausto	—N/a	Mariza		A vida toda	Carolina Deslandes
2021	Bárbara Tinoco	—N/a	Carlos do Carmo in Coliseu dos Recreios (November 2019)		Por um triz	Carolina Deslandes
2022	Dino D'Santiago		Carolina Deslandes in Coliseu dos Recreios (January 2022)		Andorinhas	Ana Moura

==== Fashion ====
Year	Personality of the Year					
1996	Nuno Gama					
1997	José Carlos					
1998	José António Tenente e Maria Gambina					
1999	Manuel Alves e José Manuel Gonçalves					
2000	Ana Isabel					
2001	Portugal Fashion					
2002	—N/a					
2003	—N/a					
2004	—N/a					
2005	—N/a					
In 2006, a change has occurred in the subcategories.
Year	Best Female Model		Best Male Model		Best Designer	
2006	Flor		Nuno Lopes		Felipe Oliveira Baptista	
Year	Best Female Model		Best Male Model		Best Stylist	Personality of the Year
2007	Elsa		Nuno Lopes		Miguel Vieira	Filipe Carrilho
Year	Best Female Model		Best Male Model		Best Designer	
Year	Model	Agency	Model	Agency	Stylist	Agency
2008	Alice	Central Models	Isaac Alfaiate	—N/a	Filipe Faísca	—N/a
2009	Erika Oliveira	Loft Models	Jonathan and Kevin Sampaio	Central Models	José António Tenente	—N/a
2010	Jani Gabriel	Central Models	Bruno Rosendo	L’Agence	Ana Salazar	—N/a
2011	Sara Sampaio	Central Models	Luís Borges	Central Models	Luís Buchinho	—N/a
2012	Sara Sampaio	Central Models	Gonçalo Teixeira	Central Models	Miguel Vieira	—N/a
2013	Sharam Diniz	L’Agence	Gonçalo Teixeira	Central Models	Nuno Baltazar	—N/a
2014	Sara Sampaio	Central Models	Fernando Cabral	Karacter	Luís Onofre	—N/a
2015	Sara Sampaio	Central Models	Ruben Rua	Elite	Filipe Faísca	—N/a
2016	Sara Sampaio	Central Models	Gonçalo Teixeira	Central Models	Luís Buchinho	—N/a
2017	Maria Clara	L'Agence	Francisco Henriques	Central Models	Luís Carvalho	—N/a
2018	Maria Miguel	L'Agence	Fernando Cabral	Karacter	Alexandra Moura	—N/a
From 2019, a change has occurred in the subcategories.
Year	Personality of the Year					
2019	Sara Sampaio					
2021	Luís Carvalho					

==== Theatre ====
Year	Personality of the Year					
1996	Eunice Muñoz					
1997	Paulo Pires					
1998	João Mota					
1999	Ruy de Carvalho					
2000	Luís Miguel Cintra					
2001	Filipe La Féria					
In 2002, a change has occurred in the subcategories.
Year	Best Actress		Best Actor		Best Play	
Year	Actress	Play or show	Actor	Play or show	Play	Director
2002	Irene Cruz	—N/a	João Perry	—N/a	Amadeus	Carlos Avilez
2003	Eunice Muñoz	On Golden Pond	Virgílio Castelo	—N/a	My Fair Lady	Filipe La Féria
2004	Carmen Dolores	—N/a	Luís Alberto	—N/a	Copenhagen	João Lourenço
2005	Cucha Carvalheiro	A Cabra, ou Quem é Sílvia	Miguel Seabra	Endgame	Endgame	Bruno Bravo
2006	Luísa Cruz	A Cadeira, Orgia e Sangue no Pescoço da Gata	João Grosso	Orgia	A Mais Velha Profissão	Fernando Lapa
2007	Maria do Céu Guerra	Todos os que Caem	João Lagarto	Começar a Acabar	Música no Coração	Filipe La Féria
2008	Beatriz Batarda	The Master Builder	Diogo Infante	Hamlet	The Tragedy of Julius Caesar	Luís Miguel Cintra
2009	Maria José Pascoal	Vieira da Silva par elle même	José Raposo	Fiddler on the Roof	West Side Story	Filipe La Féria
2010	Manuela Maria	On Golden Pond	Virgílio Castelo	The Dresser	The Dresser	João Mota
2011	Luísa Cruz	A Cidade	Miguel Guilherme	Mr Puntila and his Man Matti	Mr Puntila and his Man Matti	João Lourenço
2012	Sandra Faleiro	Who's Afraid of Virginia Woolf?	António Fonseca	The Balcony	The Balcony	Luís Miguel Cintra
2013	Maria Rueff	Lar, Doce Lar	Henrique Feist	Broadway Baby	Três Dedos Abaixo do Joelho	Tiago Rodrigues
2014	Maria José Pascoal	Palace of the End	João Perry	The Price	The Public	António Pires
2015	Sara Carinhas	A Farsa	Diogo Infante	Ode Marítima	Tropa Fandanga	Pedro Zegre Penim e José Maria Vieira Mendes
2016	Maria Rueff	António e Maria	Marco d'Almeida	Macbeth	Richard III	Tónan Quito
2017	Isabel Abreu	Um Diário de Preces	João Perry	The Father	Música	Luís Miguel Cintra
2018	Rita Cabaço	A Estupidez	Miguel Loureiro	Esquecer	Sopro	Tiago Rodrigues
2019	Luísa Cruz	The Maid Zerlina	Paulo Pinto	Uncle Vanya	Uncle Vanya	Bruno Bravo
2021	Bárbara Branco	Suddenly Last Summer	Cláudio da Silva	If This Is a Man	Life Will Swallow You Up	Tónan Quito

==== Humor ====
Year	Personality of the Year
2019	Ricardo Araújo Pereira
2021	Ricardo Araújo Pereira

==== Entertainment ====
Year	Personality of the Year
2019	Cristina Ferreira
2021	João Baião

==== Digital ====
Year	Personality of the Year
2019	Mariana Cabral (Bumba na Fofinha)
2021	Bruno Nogueira

==== Journalism ====
Year	Personality of the Year	Channel
2019	Conceição Lino	SIC

==== Best Newcomer ====
2010	2011	2012	2013	2014	2015	2016
Daniela Ruah	André Villas-Boas	Nélson Oliveira	Victoria Guerra	Sara Matos	Tiago Teotónio Pereira	Mariana Pacheco
Acting	Sports	Sports	Acting	Acting	Acting	Acting
2017	2018	2019	2020	2021	2022	2023
Beatriz Frazão	Bárbara Bandeira	João Félix	—N/a	Carolina Carvalho		
Acting	Music	Sports	—N/a	Acting		

==== Award for Merit and Excellence ====
2002	2003	2004	2005	2006	2007	2008
Agustina Bessa Luís	José Hermano Saraiva	Eusébio	—N/a	Raúl Solnado	Herman José	Eunice Muñoz
2009	2010	2011	2012	2013	2014	2015
Manoel de Oliveira	Artur Agostinho	Simone de Oliveira	Francisco Pinto Balsemão	Mário Moniz Pereira	Xutos & Pontapés	Rede Globo
2016	2017	2018	2019	2020	2021	2022
Marco Paulo	Fernando Santos	José Cid	Maria do Céu Guerra	—N/a	Vice-Admiral Gouveia e Melo	Manuel Rui Azinhais Nabeiro

==== 25 Years Special Award ====
Category	Winner
Cinema	Teresa Villaverde
Entertainment	Fernando Mendes
Fashion	Eduarda Abbondanza
Fiction	Maria João Luís
Humor	César Mourão
Music	GNR
Revelation	Filomena Cautela
Theatre	Rui Mendes

=== Inactive ===
==== Sports ====
Year	Personality of the Year					
1996	Fernanda Ribeiro					
1997	Fernanda Ribeiro					
1998	Carla Sacramento					
1999	Luís Figo					
2000	Luís Figo					
2001	Luís Figo					
2002	—N/a					
2003	—N/a					
2004	—N/a					
2019	Cristiano Ronaldo					
Year	Best Newcomer			Award for Merit and Excellence		
2005	Emanuel Silva			José Mourinho		
In 2006, a change has occurred in the subcategories.
Year	Best Footballer		Best Football Coach		Best Sportsperson	
Year	Best Footballer		Best Football Coach		Winner	Modalidade
2006	Deco		José Mourinho		Ticha Penicheiro	Basketball
2007	Cristiano Ronaldo		José Mourinho		Vanessa Fernandes	Athletics
2008	Cristiano Ronaldo		Jesualdo Ferreira		Vanessa Fernandes	Athletics
2009	Cristiano Ronaldo		Manuel José de Jesus		Nelson Évora	Athletics
In 2010, a change has occurred in the subcategories.
Year	Best Sportswoman		Best Sportsman		Best Coach	
Year	Winner	Sport	Winner	Sport	Desportista	Sport
2010	Telma Monteiro	Judo	Nelson Évora	Athletics	José Mourinho	Football
2011	Naide Gomes	Athletics	Cristiano Ronaldo	Football	José Mourinho	Football
2012	Telma Monteiro	Judo	Cristiano Ronaldo	Football	André Villas-Boas	Football
2013	Ana Dulce Félix	Athletics	Emanuel Silva and Fernando Pimenta	Canoeing	José Mourinho	Football
2014	Sara Moreira	Athletics	Cristiano Ronaldo	Football	Paulo Bento	Football
2015	Telma Monteiro	Judo	Cristiano Ronaldo	Football	Jorge Jesus	Football
2016	Telma Monteiro	Judo	Cristiano Ronaldo	Football	Jorge Jesus	Football
2017	Telma Monteiro	Judo	Cristiano Ronaldo	Football	Fernando Santos	Football
2018	Inês Henriques	Athletics	Cristiano Ronaldo	Football	Leonardo Jardim	Football
From 2019, a change has occurred in the subcategories.
Year	Personality of the Year					
2019	Cristiano Ronaldo					

=== Extinct ===
==== Television ====
- Best Information Presenter
- Best Entertainment Presenter
- Best Fiction and Comedy Program
- Best Entertainment Program
- Best Information Program
- Best Actor
- Best Actress

==== Radio ====
- Personality of the Year
- Best Station

==== Economy ====
- Best Newcomer
- Award for Merit and Excellence

==== Arts ====
- Best Newcomer
- Award for Merit and Excellence

==== Science ====
- Best Newcomer
- Award for Merit and Excellence
