= Golden Globe (Portugal) for Best Film =

Annual Portuguese film award

- Awarded for: Excellence in film
- Location: Coliseu dos Recreios, Lisbon
- Country: Portugal
- First award: 8 April 1996; 30 years ago
- Currently held by: Banzo
- Website: globosdeouro.pt

The Golden Globe (Portugal) for Best Film is awarded annually at the Golden Globes (Portugal) to the best Portuguese film of the previous year.

== Winners ==
- 1996: Adão e Eva
- 1997: Five Days, Five Nights
- 1998: Temptation
- 1999: J Zone
- 2000: Jaime
- 2001: April Captains
- 2002: I'm Going Home
- 2003: The Forest
- 2004: Quaresma
- 2005: In the Darkness of the Night
- 2006: Alice
- 2007: Coisa Ruim
- 2008: Call Girl
- 2009: Our Beloved Month of August
- 2010: Doomed Love
- 2011: Mysteries of Lisbon
- 2012: Blood of My Blood
- 2013: Tabu
- 2014: It's Love
- 2015: Os Maias
- 2016: Arabian Nights
- 2017: Letters from War
- 2018: Saint George
- 2019: Rage
- 2021: The Domain
- 2022: The Metamorphosis of Birds
- 2023: Living Soul
- 2024: Bad Living , Living Bad
- 2025: Banzo
- 2026: Night Passengers (Entroncamento)
