= 1999 Golden Globes (Portugal) =

Annual Portuguese awards ceremony

The 1999 Golden Globes (Portugal) were the fourth edition of the Golden Globes (Portugal).

== Winners ==
Cinema:

- Best Film: Zona J, with Leonel Vieira

- nominated: Os Mutantes, with Teresa Villaverde

- Best Director: Manoel de Oliveira

- nominated: Teresa Villaverde, in Os Mutantes

- Best Actress: Ana Bustorff, in Sapatos Pretos, and Zona J

- nominated: Ana Moreira, in Os Mutantes

- Best Actor: Diogo Infante, in Pesadelo Cor de Rosa

- nominated: Alexandre Pinto, in Os Mutantes
- nominated: Félix Fountoura, in Zona J

Sports:

- Personality of the Year: Luís Figo

Fashion:

- Personality of the Year: Manuel Alves and José Manuel Gonçalves

Theatre:

- Personality of the Year: Ruy de Carvalho

Music:

- Best Performer: Rui Veloso
- Best Group: Silence 4
- Best Song: Todo o tempo do mundo- Rui Veloso

Television:

- Best Information Host: José Alberto Carvalho
- Best Entertainment Host: Herman José
- Best Fiction and Comedy Show: Médico de Família
- Best Entertainment Show: Herman Enciclopédia
- Best Information Program: Grande Reportagem

Career Award:

- Carlos do Carmo
