= Golden Globe (Portugal) for Best Sportswoman =

Annual Portuguese sports award

The Golden Globe (Portugal) for Best Newcomer is awarded annually at the Golden Globes (Portugal) to the best Portuguese female athletes of the previous year.

== Winners ==
| 2010 | 2011 | 2012 | 2013 | 2014 | 2015 | 2016 | 2017 | 2018 |
|---|---|---|---|---|---|---|---|---|
| Telma Monteiro | Naide Gomes | Telma Monteiro | Ana Dulce Félix | Sara Moreira | Telma Monteiro | Telma Monteiro | Telma Monteiro | Inês Henriques |
| Judo | Athletics | Judo | Athletics | Athletics | Judo | Judo | Judo | Athletics |
