= 2001 in Portugal =

- Centuries: 19th; 20th; 21st
- Decades: 1980s; 1990s; 2000s; 2010s; 2020s
- See also: List of years in Portugal

Events in the year 2001 in Portugal.

== Incumbents ==
- President: Jorge Sampaio
- Prime Minister: António Guterres (Socialist)

== Events ==
=== January to June ===
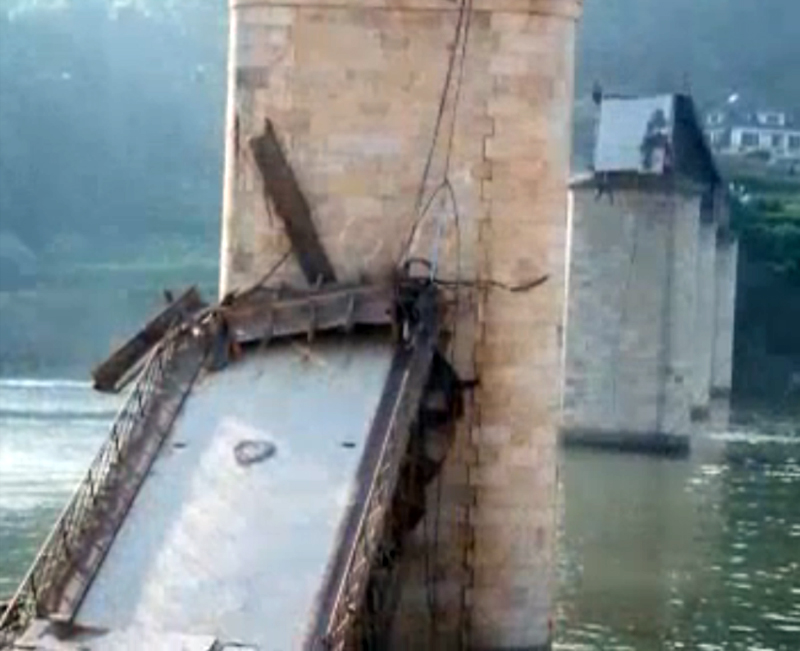
4 March: The collapse of the 116-year Hintze Ribeiro bridge into the Douro river claims the lives of 59 people.

- 14 January – Presidential election: Jorge Sampaio is re-elected for a second term as President after defeating his Social Democratic rival Joaquim Ferreira do Amaral. Having achieved more than half of all ballots cast in the first round, Sampaio's vote tally eliminates the need for a second run-off round. Turnout falls to approximately 50%, the lowest in a presidential election since Portugal's return to democracy in 1974.
- 29 January – Heavy rainfall causes flooding across northern and central Portugal, cutting off villages and forcing the closure of roads and railway lines. The inclement weather leads to the deaths of six people and the sinking of a cargo ship carrying fertiliser off the Portuguese coast, whose crew of five are rescued from the Atlantic Ocean.
- 4 March – The Hintze Ribeiro bridge near the town of Entre-os-Rios in the Porto District collapses into the Douro River below, killing 59 people. In response Prime Minister António Guterres orders an official inquiry into the incident and accepts the resignation of Jorge Coelho, the Public Works Minister. The government additionally declares two days of national mourning.
- 11 March – In motor racing, Finland's Tommi Mäkinen wins the 2001 Rally de Portugal.
- 24 March – Fourteen people are killed and a further 24 are injured when a tour bus crashes down a 100-foot (30 m) ravine after leaving the IP3 highway near Santa Comba Dao in the central Viseu District. In response local residents stage a protest over the safety of the road, an action which follows similar demonstrations held in the months preceding the crash.
- 7 April – The 2001 Globos de Ouro media awards ceremony is held at the Coliseu dos Recreios in Lisbon. Capitães de Abril wins the prize for Best Film and Vítor Norte (Tarde Demais) and Maria de Medeiros (Capitães de Abril) are awarded Best Actor and Best Actress respectively.
- 18 May – In association football, Boavista F.C. win the 2000–01 Primeira Liga after a 3–0 victory over C.D. Aves. It is the club's maiden top-flight league championship title and marks the first time in more than five decades that the championship has been won by a team from outside the country's big three clubs of F.C. Porto, S.L. Benfica, and Sporting CP.

=== July to December ===
- 1 July – A new law decriminalising the use of all previously prohibited drugs, including cannabis and cocaine, comes into effect.
- 25 August – Eleven people are injured when Transat Flight 236 carrying 304 passengers from Toronto to Lisbon is forced to make an emergency landing at Lajes Airport in the Azores after a reported loss of power to all engines.
- 1 October – The legal blood alcohol limit for drivers is lowered from 0.5 to 0.2 milligrams per litre in a bid to reduce the number of road traffic accidents on Portugal's roads, which ranks as the highest in Europe. Fines imposed for speeding offences and driving under the influence of alcohol and drugs are also increased.
- 13 December – The historic centre of the town of Guimarães is declared a UNESCO World Heritage Site.
- 16 December – Local elections: The Social Democratic Party wins control of 144 councils in what is seen as a comprehensive defeat for Prime Minister António Guterres' Socialist Party, which in defiance of pre-election polls loses in its traditional strongholds of Lisbon and Porto.
- 17 December – President Jorge Sampaio accepts the resignation of Prime Minister António Guterres following the Socialist Party's defeat in the local elections, opening the possibility of a general election in early 2002. Sampaio nevertheless does not rule out naming an interim Prime Minister until the election's planned date in October 2003.

== Arts and entertainment ==
=== Films ===
- Ganhar a Vida (Get a Life) by João Canijo.
- Vou Para Casa (I'm Going Home) by Manoel de Oliveira.

== Sports ==
Football (soccer) competitions: Primeira Liga, Liga de Honra

== Births ==
- 27 March – Gustavo Ribeiro, skateboarder.

== Deaths ==
- 31 July – Francisco da Costa Gomes, military officer and politician, President of Portugal (1974–1976) (born 1914).
