= 1997 Golden Globes (Portugal) =

Annual Portuguese film awards ceremony

The 1997 Golden Globes (Portugal) were the second edition of the Golden Globes (Portugal).

== Winners ==
Cinema:

- Best Film: Cinco Dias, Cinco Noites, with José Fonseca e Costa
- Best Director: Manoel de Oliveira, in Party
- Best Actress: Inês de Medeiros, in Pandora
- Best Actor: Diogo Infante, in Mortinho por chegar a casa

Sports:

- Personality of the Year: Fernanda Ribeiro

Fashion:

- Personality of the Year: José Carlos

Theatre:

- Personality of the Year: Paulo Pires

Music:

- Best Performer: Luís Represas
- Best Group: Delfins
- Best Song: Se eu fosse um dia o teu olhar - Pedro Abrunhosa

Television:

- Best Information Host: José Rodrigues dos Santos
- Best Entertainment Host: Herman José
- Best Fiction and Comedy Show: Contra Informação
- Best Entertainment Show: Herman Total
- Best Information Program: Maria Elisa

Career Award:

- Mário Soares
