= 2008 Golden Globes (Portugal) =

Annual Portuguese awards ceremony

The 2008 Golden Globes (Portugal) were the 13th edition of the Golden Globes (Portugal).

== Winners and nominees ==
- Cinema:
  - Best Film: Call Girl with António Pedro Vasconcelos
  - Best Actor: Ivo Canelas
  - Best Actress: Soraia Chaves (Call Girl, by António Pedro Vasconcelos)
- Theatre:
  - Best Play: Tragédia de Júlio César with Luís Miguel Cintra
  - Best Actress: Beatriz Batarda
  - Best Actor: Diogo Infante in Hamlet
- Fashion:
  - Best Stylist: Filipe Faísca
  - Best Male Model: Isaac Alfaiate
  - Best Female Model: Alice
- Music:
  - Best Individual Performer: Jorge Palma
  - Best Group: Da Weasel
  - Super Artist: Mundo Cão
- Sport:
  - Best Sportsperson: Vanessa Fernandes
  - Best Coach: Jesualdo Ferreira
  - Best Football Player: Cristiano Ronaldo
- Award of Merit and Excellence:
  - Eunice Muñoz
