= 1998 Golden Globes (Portugal) =

Annual Portuguese film awards ceremony

The 1998 Golden Globes (Portugal) were the third edition of the Golden Globes (Portugal).

== Winners ==
Cinema:

- Best Film: Tentação, with Joaquim Leitão
- Best Director: Joaquim Leitão, in Tentação
- Best Actress: Ana Zanatti, in Porto Santo
- Best Actor: Joaquim de Almeida, in Tentação

- nominated: Ruy de Carvalho, in Inês de Portugal

Sports:

- Personality of the Year: Carla Sacramento

Fashion:

- Personality of the Year: José António Tenente and Maria Gambina

Theatre:

- Personality of the Year: João Mota

Music:

- Best Individual Performer: Paulo Gonzo
- Best Group: Madredeus
- Best Song: Jardins Proibidos- Paulo Gonzo

Television:

- Best Information Host: José Alberto Carvalho
- Best Entertainment Host: Herman José
- Best Fiction and Comedy Show: Herman Enciclopédia
- Best Entertainment Show: Chuva de Estrelas
- Best Information Program: Jornal da Noite

Career Award:

- Ruy de Carvalho
