= 1996 Golden Globes (Portugal) =

List of awards in arts and sport

The first edition of the Golden Globes (Portugal) was in 1996.

== Winners ==
=== Cinema ===
- Best Film: Adão e Eva, with Joaquim Leitão
- Best Director: Joaquim Leitão in Adão e Eva
- Best Actress: Maria de Medeiros in Adão e Eva
- Best Actor: Joaquim de Almeida in Adão e Eva

=== Sports ===
- Personality of the Year: Fernanda Ribeiro

=== Fashion ===
- Personality of the Year: Nuno Gama

=== Theatre ===
- Personality of the Year: Eunice Muñoz

=== Music ===
- Best Performer: Dulce Pontes
- Best Group: Delfins
- Best Song: Sou como um Rio - Delfins

=== Television ===
- Best Information Host: José Rodrigues dos Santos
- Best Entertainment Host: Herman José, in Parabéns
- Best Fiction and Comedy Show: Camilo e Filho
- Best Entertainment Show: Chuva de Estrelas
- Best Information Program: Jornal da Noite

=== Career Award ===
- David Mourão Ferreira
