= 2000 in Portugal =

- Decades: 1980s; 1990s; 2000s; 2010s; 2020s
- See also: History of Portugal; Timeline of Portuguese history; List of years in Portugal

The following lists events that happened during 2000 in Portugal.

== Incumbents ==
- President: Jorge Sampaio
- Prime Minister: António Guterres (Socialist)

== Events ==
- 19 March – In motor racing, Great Britain's Richard Burns wins the 2000 Rally de Portugal.
- 2 April – The 2000 Globos de Ouro media awards ceremony is held at the Coliseu dos Recreios in Lisbon. Jaime wins the prize for Best Film and Vítor Norte and Ana Bustorff are awarded Best Actor and Best Actress respectively.
- 16 April:
  - Seven people are killed and 65 people are injured after a gas bomb detonates within a Lisbon nightclub, prompting a stampede to escape.
  - Portugal's Antonio Pinto wins the London Marathon in a time of 2 hours, 6 minutes, and 35 seconds, setting a new course and European record.
- 28 June – In association football, the Portuguese national team's participation in Euro 2000 ends after a 2–1 defeat to France in the semi-finals.
- 29 June – Serial killer Sid Ahmed Rezala, one of France's most sought-after criminals, kills himself by setting fire to his prison cell in Lisbon while awaiting extradition to France. Alberto Costa, the Justice Minister, announces an inquiry into Rezala's death.
- 3 September – In motor racing, Australia's Garry McCoy wins the inaugural Portuguese motorcycle Grand Prix held at the Circuito do Estoril.
- 24 November – The first case of bovine spongiform encephalopathy (BSE) in the Azores is confirmed following a positive case in a cow imported from Germany in 1998. Officials subsequently announce that more than 2,500 cows sourced from overseas will be slaughtered to calm consumer concerns about the spread of the disease, which has been observed in more than 450 cases across mainland Portugal since 1990.
- 27 December – Portugal Telecom announces that Siemens, Alcatel, and Sony Ericsson will develop and supply the infrastructure for the country's high-speed mobile phone network, which is set to be completed by the end of 2001.

=== Unknown date ===
- The 2000 Festival da Canção competition concludes with Liana being announced as the winner with the song "Sonhos Mágicos".

== Arts and entertainment ==
=== Films ===
- No Quarto da Vanda (In Vanda's Room) by Pedro Costa.
- Palavra e Utopia (Word and Utopia) by Manoel de Oliveira.

== Births ==
- 21 May – Afonso Gonçalves, Portuguese nationalist political activist
- 28 April – André Silva, footballer (d. 2025)

== Deaths ==
- 5 July – Edgar Cardoso, civil engineer (born 1913).
