= 2000 Golden Globes (Portugal) =

Annual Portuguese awards ceremony

The 2000 Golden Globes (Portugal) were held at the Coliseu dos Recreios, Lisbon on 2 April 2000.

== Winners ==
Cinema:

- Best Film: Jaime, with António Pedro Vasconcelos
- Best Director: António Pedro Vasconcelos, in Jaime
- Best Actress: Ana Bustorff, in Inferno
- Best Actor: Vítor Norte, in A Sombra dos Abutres, and Jaime

Sports:

- Personality of the Year : Luís Figo

Theatre:

- Personality of the Year : Luís Miguel Cintra

Music:

- Best Performer: Sara Tavares
- Best Group: Ala dos Namorados
- Best Song: Solta-se o beijo - Ala dos Namorados

Television:

- Best Information Host: José Alberto Carvalho
- Best Entertainment Host: Bárbara Guimarães
- Best Fiction and Comedy Show: Médico de Família
- Best Entertainment Show: Chuva de Estrelas
- Best Information Program: Esta Semana

Radio:

- Personality of the Year – António Sérgio
- Best Station - TSF

Career Award:

- Casa do Artista (Armando Cortez and Raul Solnado)
