= 2001 Golden Globes (Portugal) =

Annual Portuguese awards ceremony

The 2001 Golden Globes (Portugal) were held at the Coliseu dos Recreios, Lisbon on 7 April 2001.

== Winners ==
Cinema:

- Best Film: Capitães de Abril, with Maria de Medeiros
- Best Director: Manoel de Oliveira
- Best Actress: Maria de Medeiros, in (Capitães de Abril)
- Best Actor: Vítor Norte, in Tarde Demais

Sports:

- Personality of the Year: Luís Figo

Fashion:

- Personality of the Year: Portugal Fashion

Theatre:

- Personality of the Year: Filipe La Féria

Music:

- Best Performer: Camané
- Best Group: Silence 4
- Best Song: Sopro do Coração- Clã

Television:

- Best Information Host: Rodrigo Guedes de Carvalho
- Best Entertainment Host: Carlos Cruz
- Best Fiction and Comedy Show: Cuidado com as Aparências
- Best Entertainment Show: Herman SIC
- Best Information Program: Esta Semana

Rádio:

- Personality of the Year – Fernando Alves

Career Award:

- João Lagos
