= 2003 Golden Globes (Portugal) =

Annual Portuguese awards ceremony

The 2003 Golden Globes (Portugal) were the eighth edition of the Golden Globes (Portugal).

== Winners ==
Cinema:

- Best Film: A Selva, with Leonel Vieira
- Best Actress: Alexandra Lencastre, in O Delfim

- nominated: Margarida Marinho, in Aparelho Voador a Baixa Altitude

- Best Actor: Vítor Norte, in O Gotejar da Luz – Paixão em África

- nominated: Rogério Samora, in O Delfim

Theatre:

- Best Actress: Eunice Muñoz (A Casa do Lago, de Ernest Thompson)
- Best Actor: Virgílio Castelo
- Best Peça: My Fair Lady, encenado por Filipe La Féria

Music:

- Best Performer: Carlos do Carmo (Nove Fados e uma Canção de Amor)
- Best Group: Madredeus (CD Euforia e Electrónico)
- Best Song: Momento – Uma espécie de Céu- Pedro Abrunhosa

Television:

- Fiction and Comedy:
  - Best Program: O Processo dos Távoras
  - Best Actress: Alexandra Lencastre (Fúria de Viver)
  - Best Actor: Camacho Costa (Malucos do Riso e Às Duas por Três')
- Information:
  - Best presenter: José Alberto Carvalho (Telejornal RTP)
  - Best Program: Telejornal (RTP)
- Entertainment:
  - Best Program: Herman SIC
  - Best Presentader: Catarina Furtado (Catarina.com)

Award of Merit and Excellence :

- José Hermano Saraiva
