= 2002 in Portugal =

- Decades: 1980s; 1990s; 2000s; 2010s; 2020s
- See also: History of Portugal; Timeline of Portuguese history; List of years in Portugal

Events in the year 2002 in Portugal.

== Incumbents ==
- President: Jorge Sampaio
- Prime Minister: António Guterres (Socialist) (until 6 April); José Manuel Barroso (Social Democratic) (from 6 April)

== Events ==
=== January to March ===
- 1 January – The Euro Currency officially became the legal tender for Portugal, along with the other European Union (EU) Eurozone member area countries, replacing the Portuguese escudo by being introduced physically with the official launch of the currency coins and banknotes. Portugal entered a period on the same day where specifically both the Euro Currency and the Portuguese escudo were in dual circulation until specifically 28 February. The BBC reports that by 5 January the euro is the chosen currency for over half of all transactions.
- 18 January – Nurse Maria do Ceu Ribeiro is sentenced to eight-and-a-half years in prison after performing more than 100 illegal abortions over fifteen years in the town of Maia. The four-month trial also concludes with Ribeiro being found guilty of the illegal use of anaesthetics and for falsifying prescriptions.

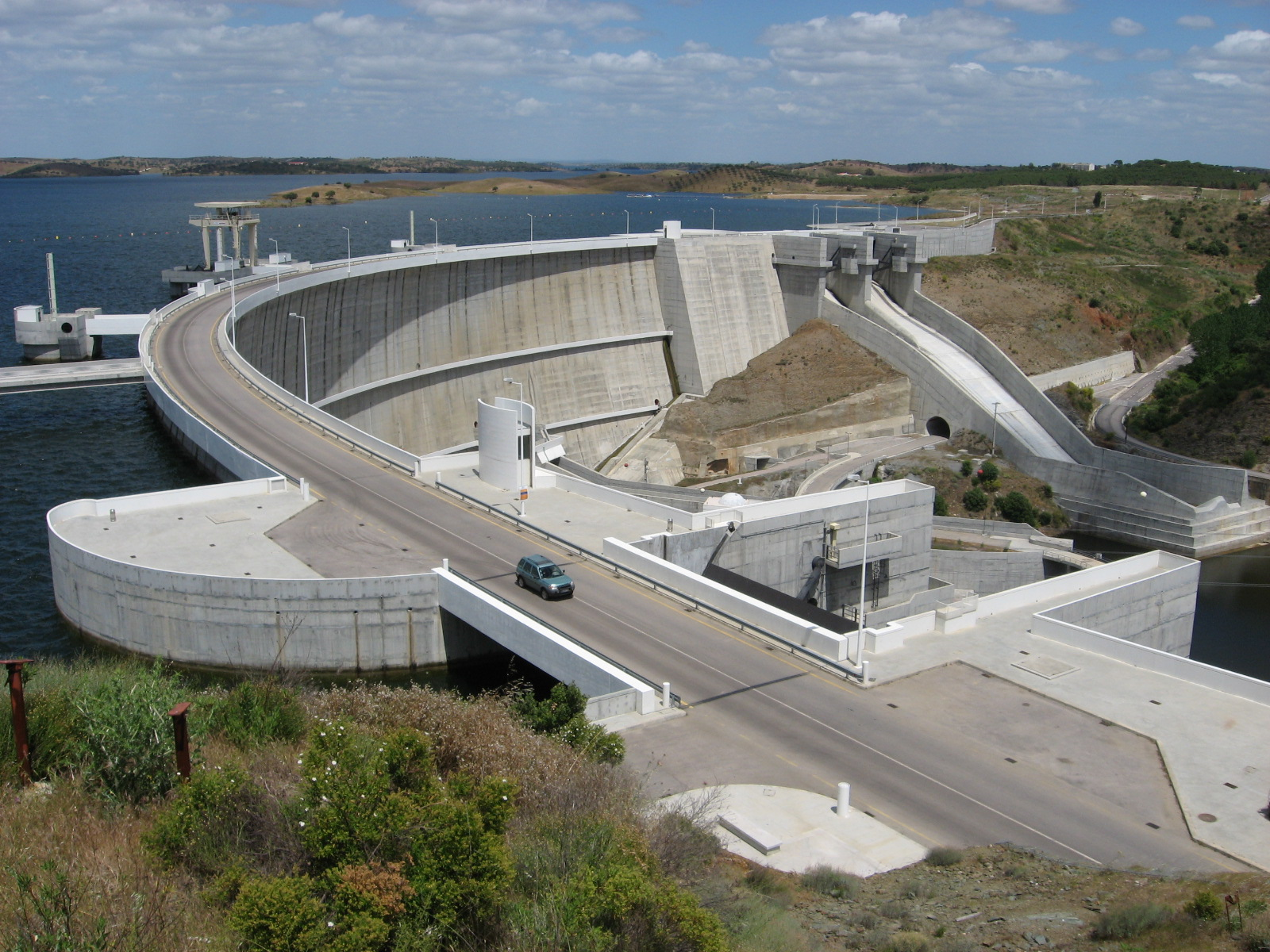
8 February: The Alqueva dam (pictured in 2007) in southern Portugal opens

- 30 January – The European Commission advises that the Portuguese government be formally cautioned over its increasing budget deficit, which grew to 2.2% of GDP in 2001, double the 1.1% that was forecast.
- 8 February – The $1.7bn Alqueva dam begins operation on the Guadiana river at the Évora–Beja district border, starting the process of creating a 250-square-kilometre (97 sq mi) reservoir which will become Europe's largest artificial lake.
- 18 February – Data from the Instituto Nacional de Estatística reveals there was a marginal rise in the national unemployment rate in 2001 to 4.1%, an increase of 0.1% compared to 2000.
- 17 March – Legislative election: The Social Democratic Party (PSD) led by José Manuel Barroso defeats the governing Socialist Party to become the largest party in the Assembly of the Republic with 40.1% of the vote and 105 seats. Short of an overall majority in the 230-seat Assembly, the PSD enters into a coalition alongside the CDS – People's Party with Barroso nominated by President Jorge Sampaio to lead the government as the next prime minister.

=== April to June ===
- 6 April – José Manuel Barosso is sworn in as Prime Minister of Portugal as the head of a coalition between the PSD and the CDS – People's Party, with the leader of the latter party, Paulo Portas, becoming the new Defence Minister.
- 28 April – In association football, Sporting CP secure the 2001–02 Primeira Liga title after championship rivals Boavista F.C. are defeated by S.L. Benfica.
- 7 May – The 2002 Globos de Ouro media awards ceremony is held with Manoel de Oliveira's Vou Para Casa winning the prize for Best Film.
- 17 May – Proposals to renovate the former Lisbon headquarters of the Estado Novo security agency and secret police PIDE into luxury accommodation attract criticism from anti-fascist campaigners, who express concerns that historic acts of torture committed on-site against political opponents by PIDE's secret police will go unrecognised in the building's new guise.
- 20 May – The former colony of Portuguese Timor in southeast Asia becomes the independent country of East Timor, bringing to a close 24 years of Indonesian occupation since the end of Portuguese rule in 1975.
- 13 June – In association football, the Portugal national team are eliminated from the 2002 FIFA World Cup after a 1–0 loss to co-hosts South Korea in the round of sixteen. Manager Antonio Oliveira is later dismissed from his position on 25 June after failing to perform to expectations.
- 25 June – Six people are arrested and almost 83,000 ecstasy tablets are seized after police dismantle a drugs factory in Albufeira, the first known action of its kind in Portugal.

=== July to September ===
- 26 July – The European Commission confirms that it will commence a sanctions procedure against Portugal following an increase in the country's national deficit to 4.1% of GDP, beyond the 3.0% agreed by Eurozone member states in 1997. The rise comes despite an agreement reached earlier in the year between the European Commission and the government to eliminate the deficit by 2004.
- 15 August – In cycling, Denmark's Claus Møller wins the 2002 Volta a Portugal in a time of 47 hours, 51 minutes and 33 seconds, beating his Milaneza–MSS teammate Joan Horrach by a margin of five seconds.
- 8 September – In motor racing, Italy's Valentino Rossi wins the 2002 Portuguese motorcycle Grand Prix held at the Circuito do Estoril.

=== October to December ===
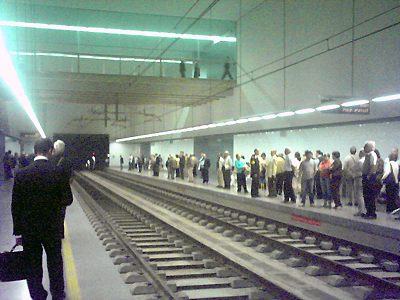
7 December: The Porto Metro is inaugurated with services running between the Trindade (pictured in 2005) and Senhor de Matosinhos stations

- 21 October – The results of the 2001 census are released, showing a 5.0% rise in the national population to 10,356,117 since the last census in 1991.
- 23 November – Paratrooper Diogo Miguel Ribeirinho Dantas is confirmed as a victim of the terrorist bombings in Bali on 12 October after being reported missing since the attack. Ribeirinho, who was on leave from the United Nations peacekeeping mission in East Timor, is Portugal's sole casualty in the bombings.
- 7 December – The Porto Metro is officially opened by Prime Minister José Manuel Barroso in a ceremony held at the Casa da Música train station. Initially consisting of a single route 12 kilometres (7.5 mi) in length between the Trindade and Senhor de Matosinhos stations, the system is expected to expand to cover multiple routes stretching 70 kilometres (43 mi) by 2004.
- 10 December – The General Confederation of the Portuguese Workers (CGTP) stages a one-day strike of its 800,000 members in protest over the government's proposed reforms to employment law, impacting public transport, schools, healthcare facilities, government agencies, and postal services.

== Arts and entertainment ==
=== Publications ===
- The Double (Portuguese: O Homem Duplicado) by José Saramago.

=== Films ===
- Light Drops (Portuguese: O Gotejar da Luz) by Fernando Vendrell.
- The Uncertainty Principle (Portuguese: O Princípio da Incerteza) by Manoel de Oliveira.

== Births ==
- 2 March – Eduardo Quaresma, footballer.
- 19 June – Nuno Mendes, footballer.
- 19 November – Nenny, singer-songwriter and rapper.

== Deaths ==
- 13 February – Carlos Aboim Inglez, politician (born 1930).
- 22 February – Marcelino Vespeira, painter (born 1925).
- 29 April – Fernando Pessa, journalist (born 1902).
- 22 August – Bruce Guimaraens, winemaker (born 1935).
- 1 December – Baltasar Rebelo de Sousa, politician and doctor (born 1921).
