= 2012 Golden Globes (Portugal) =

Annual Portuguese awards ceremony

The 2012 Golden Globes (Portugal) was held on 20 May 2012 and broadcast by SIC and presented by Bárbara Guimarães.

== Winners and nominees ==
=== Cinema ===
Best Film:

- Sangue do Meu Sangue - João Canijo
  - América - João Nuno Pinto
  - O Barão - Edgar Pêra
  - Viagem a Portugal - Sérgio Tréfaut

Best Actor:

- Nuno Melo - O Barão
  - Nuno Lopes - Sangue do Meu Sangue
  - Rafael Morais - Sangue do Meu Sangue
  - Fernando Luís - América

Best Actress:

- Rita Blanco - Sangue do Meu Sangue
  - Anabela Moreira - Sangue do Meu Sangue
  - Maria de Medeiros - Viagem a Portugal
  - Beatriz Batarda - Cisne

=== Theatre ===
Best Play:

- A Varanda - Luís Miguel Cintra
  - A Lua de Maria Sem - Maria João Luís
  - Recordações de uma Revolução - Mónica Calle
  - Vermelho - João Lourenço

Best Actor:

- Ivo Canelas - Amadeus
  - António Fonseca - Vermelho
  - Dinarte Branco - Morte de Judas
  - Elmano Sancho - Não se Brinca com o Amor

Best Actress:

- Sandra Faleiro - Quem tem medo de Virginia Woolf
  - Mónica Calle - Recordações de uma Revolução
  - Luísa Cruz - A Varanda
  - Catarina Wallenstein - Não se Brinca com o Amor

=== Fashion ===
Best Stylist:

- Miguel Vieira
  - Felipe Oliveira Baptista
  - Luís Buchinho
  - Os Burgueses

Best Male Model:

- Gonçalo Teixeira - Central Models
  - Bruno Rosendo - L'Agence
  - Jonathan e Kevin - Central Models
  - Luís Borges - Central Models

Best Female Model:

- Sara Sampaio - Central Models
  - Milena Cardoso - Elite
  - Jani - Elite
  - Matilde - Best Models

=== Sports ===
Best Male Coach:

- André Villas-Boas - Football
  - Domingos Paciência - Football
  - José Mourinho - Football
  - Mário Palma - Basketball

Best Male Athlete:

- Cristiano Ronaldo - Football
  - Armindo Araújo - Motoring
  - Hélder Rodrigues - Motorcycle
  - João Pina - Judo

Best Female Athlete:

- Telma Monteiro - Judo
  - Ana Dulce Félix - Athletics
  - Naide Gomes - Athletics
  - Teresa Portela - Canoeing

=== Music ===
Best Individual Performer:

- Jorge Palma - Com Todo o Respeito
  - Fernando Alvim - Fados & Canções do Alvim
  - Sérgio Godinho - Mútuo Consentimento
  - Luísa Sobral - The Cherry on My Cake

Best Group:

- Amor Electro - Cai o Carmo e a Trindade
  - Buraka Som Sistema - Komba
  - Clã - Disco Voador
  - Dead Combo - Lisboa Mulata

Best Song:

- "A Máquina" - Amor Electro (Cai o Carmo e a Trindade)
  - "A Pele que Há em Mim" - Márcia & JP Simões (Dá)
  - "Asas Delta" - Clã (Disco Voador)
  - "Página em Branco" - Jorge Palma (Com todo o Respeito)

=== Best Newcomer ===
- Nélson Oliveira - Sports
  - Amor Electro - Music
  - Ângelo Rodrigues - Acting
  - Luísa Sobral - Music

=== Award of Merit and Excellence ===
- Francisco Pinto Balsemão
