= 2004 Golden Globes (Portugal) =

Annual Portuguese awards ceremony

The 2004 Golden Globes (Portugal) were held at the Coliseu dos Recreios, Lisbon on 25 May 2004.

== Winners ==
Cinema:

- Best Film: Quaresma, with José Álvaro Morais
- Best Actress: Beatriz Batarda, in Quaresma

- nominated: Paula Mora, in Os Imortais

- Best Actor: Nicolau Breyner, in Os Imortais

Theatre:

- Best Actress: Carmen Dolores
- Best Actor: Luís Alberto
- Best Play: Copenhaga (enc. João Lourenço)

Music:

- Best Performer: Rui Veloso
- Best Group: Mesa
- Best Song: Carta- Toranja

Television:

- Fiction and Comedy :
  - Best Program: Malucos do Riso
  - Best Actress: Alexandra Lencastre (Ana e os Sete)
  - Best Actor: Diogo Infante (Jóia de África)

Information:

  - Best Presenter: José Alberto Carvalho (Telejornal RTP)
  - Best Program: Telejornal (RTP)

Entertainment:

  - Best Program: Operação Triunfo
  - Best Presenter: Jorge Gabriel

Award of Merit and Excellence:

- Eusébio
