= 2002 Golden Globes (Portugal) =

Annual Portuguese awards ceremony

The 2002 Golden Globes (Portugal) were held on 7 May 2002.

== Winners ==
Cinema:

- Best Film: Je Rentre à la Maison, with Manoel de Oliveira
- Best Actress: Rita Blanco, in Ganhar a Vida
- Best Actor: Joaquim de Almeida, in O Xangô de Baker Street

Theatre:

- Best Actress: Irene Cruz
- Best Actor: João Perry
- Best Peça: Amadeus, encenado por Carlos Avilez

Music:

- Best Performer: João Pedro Pais
- Best Group: Santamaria
- Best Song: Não Há – João Pedro Pais

Television:

- Best Fiction and Comedy Show Actress: Maria Rueff with O Programa da Maria and Herman SIC
- Best Fiction and Comedy Show Actor: Ruy de Carvalho with Olhos de Água
- Best Fiction and Comedy Show: Olhos de Água
- Best Information Host: José Alberto Carvalho
- Best Entertainment Host: Herman José
- Best Fiction and Comedy Show: Cuidado com as Aparências
- Best Entertainment Show: Herman SIC
- Best Information Program: Jornal da Noite

Award of Merit and Excellence:

- Agustina Bessa Luís
