= 2005 Golden Globes (Portugal) =

Annual Portuguese awards ceremony

The 2005 Golden Globes (Portugal) were the tenth edition of the Golden Globes (Portugal).

== Winners and nominees ==
- Cinema:
  - Best Film: Noite Escura, with João Canijo
  - nominated: A Costa dos Murmúrios, with Margarida Cardoso
  - nominated: André Valente, with Catarina Ruivo
  - nominated: O Milagre Segundo Salomé, with Mário Barroso
  - Best Actor: Nicolau Breyner, in Kiss Me, and O Milagre Segundo Salomé
  - nominated: Fernando Luís, in Noite Escura
  - nominated: Filipe Duarte, in A Costa dos Murmúrios, and O Milagre Segundo Salomé
  - nominated: Leonardo Viveiros, in André Valente
  - Best Actress: Beatriz Batarda, in A Costa dos Murmúrios, and Noite Escura
  - nominated: Mónica Calle, in A Costa dos Murmúrios
  - nominated: Rita Blanco, in Noite Escura
  - nominated: Rita Durão, in André Valente
