= 2008 Golden Globes =

2008 Golden Globes may refer to:

- 65th Golden Globe Awards, the Golden Globe Awards ceremony that was set to take place in 2008, before a writers' strike halted those plans.
- 66th Golden Globe Awards, the 2009 awards ceremony honoring the best in film and television for 2008
- 2008 Golden Globes (Portugal)
