= Tentação =

- Directed by: Joaquim Leitão
- Screenplay by: Joaquim Leitão
- Produced by: Tino Navarro
- Starring: Diogo Infante; Cristina Câmara; Ana Bustorff; Joaquim de Almeida; Sofia Leite
- Cinematography: Carlos Assis
- Production companies: MGN; SIC; Sky Light Cinema
- Distributed by: Lusomundo
- Release date: December 26, 1997 (Portugal)
- Running time: 115 minutes
- Country: Portugal
- Language: Portuguese
- Budget: $265,000,000
- Box office: 400,000 admissions (Portugal)

Tentação is a 1997 Portuguese drama film directed by Joaquim Leitão. It was released on 26 December 1997.

== Cast ==
- Joaquim de Almeida as António
- Cristina Câmara as Lena
- Ana Bustorff
- Diogo Infante
- Sofia Leite

== Production ==
It had a budget of $265,000,000. The filming locations included Vila Nova de Gaia and Lisbon.

== Synopsis ==
Father Antonio is a priest by vocation, committed and generous, very dear to the people of Vila Daires, a quiet town in the North of the country. But Father Antonio is also a man, and Vila Daires is not as peaceful as it seems. Father António's good intentions will not be enough to stop the escalating conflicts. And when his fate crosses paths with Lena, the town's "black sheep", he will also be forced to confront his own demons. Especially those he never even thought existed.

== Reception ==
The film was successful in Portugal. 18 days after being released, the film had 203,853 admissions and went on to have admissions of 400,000, being one of the top 10 grossing films of the year.

=== Accolades ===
Award	Date	Category	Recipients and nominees	Result
Globos de Ouro	1998	Best Film	Tentação	Won
Globos de Ouro	1998	Best Director	Joaquim Leitão	Won
Globos de Ouro	1998	Best Actor	Joaquim de Almeida	Won
Troféus Nova Gente	16 March 1998	Best Film	Tentação	Won
Troféus Nova Gente	16 March 1998	Best Acting	Cristina Câmara	Won
