= 2018 Golden Globes (Portugal) =

Annual Portuguese awards ceremony

The 2018 Golden Globes (Portugal) were held on 21 May 2018 and were broadcast by SIC. The show was presented by César Mourão.

== Winners and nominees ==
=== Cinema ===
Best Film:

- São Jorge - Marco Martins
  - Peregrinação - João Botelho
  - Fátima (2017 film) - João Canijo
  - A Fábrica de Nada - Pedro Pinho

Best Actor:

- Nuno Lopes - São Jorge
  - José Raposo - São Jorge
  - Cláudio da Silva - Peregrinação
  - Sinde Filipe - Zeus (film)

Best Actress:

- Rita Blanco - Fátima
  - Anabela Moreira - Fátima
  - Lia Carvalho - Verão Danado
  - Carla Galvão - A Fábrica de Nada

=== Theatre ===
Best Play:

- Sopro - Tiago Rodrigues
  - Bacantes: Prelúdio Para uma Purga - Marlene Freitas
  - Splendid's - Carlos Avilez
  - Todo o Mundo é um Palco - Marco Martins and Beatriz Batarda

Best Actor:

- Miguel Loureiro - Esquecer
  - Elmano Sancho - Display
  - Ivo Canelas - Pedro e o Capitão
  - Pedro Gil - Pedro e o Capitão

Best Actress:

- Rita Cabaço - A Estupidez
  - Isabel Abreu - Sopro
  - Rita Lello - Mariana Pineda
  - Ana Palma - Display

=== Fashion ===
Best Stylist:

- Alexandra Mouro
  - Filipe Faísca
  - Dino Alves
  - Carlos Gil

Best Male Model:

- Fernando Cabral - Karacter Agency
  - Luís Borges - Central Models
  - Francisco Henriques - Central Models
  - Ricardo Cotovio - Central Models

Best Female Model:

- Maria Miguel - L'Agence
  - Sara Sampaio - Central Models
  - Maria Clara - L'Agence
  - Isilda - Central Models

=== Sports ===
Best Male Coach:

- Leonardo Jardim - Football
  - Rui Vitória - Football
  - José Mourinho - Football
  - Hélio Lucas - Canoeing

Best Male Athlete:

- Cristiano Ronaldo - Football
  - Ricardinho - Futsal
  - Fernando Pimenta - Canoeing
  - Nélson Évora - Athletics

Best Female Athlete:

- Inês Henriques - Athletics
  - Joana Schenker - Bodyboard
  - Teresa Bonvalot - Surf
  - Joana Ramos - Judo

=== Music ===
Best Individual Performer:

- Raquel Tavares - Roberto Carlos por Raquel Tavares
  - Salvador Sobral - Excuse Me (Ao Vivo)
  - Richie Campbell - Lisboa
  - Miguel Araújo - Giesta

Best Group:

- HMB - Mais
  - D.A.M.A - Lado a Lado
  - The Gift - Altar
  - Ermo - Lo-Fi Moda

Best Song:

- "Amar pelos dois" - Salvador Sobral
  - "Manto de Água" - Agir ft. Ana Moura
  - "Se me deixasses ser" - Tiago Bettencourt
  - "Como É Grande o Meu Amor por Você" - Raquel Tavares

=== Best Newcomer ===
- Bárbara Bandeira - Music
  - Rúben Dias - Football
  - João Maneira - Acting
  - Calema - Music

=== Award of Merit and Excellence ===
- José Cid
