= 1998 in Portugal =

- Decades: 1970s; 1980s; 1990s; 2000s; 2010s
- See also: History of Portugal; Timeline of Portuguese history; List of years in Portugal

Events in the year 1998 in Portugal.

== Incumbents ==
- President: Jorge Sampaio
- Prime Minister: António Guterres (Socialist)

== Events ==
=== January to June ===
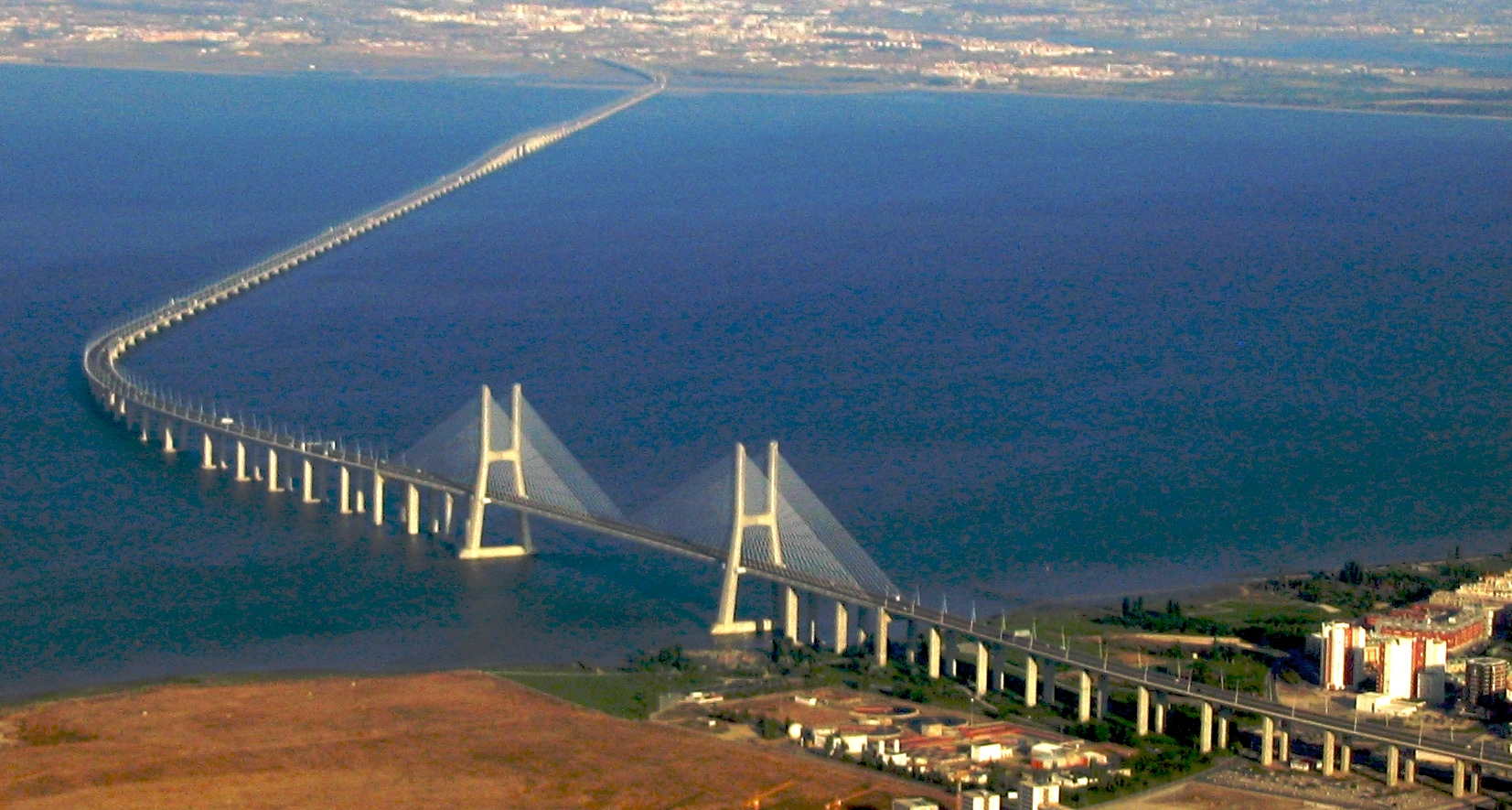
22 March: The 17-kilometre Vasco da Gama bridge in Lisbon (pictured in 2006) opens

- 4 March – Rui Pedro Teixeira Mendonça, an eleven-year old boy from Lousada in the Porto District, goes missing. As of 2021 his whereabouts remain unknown. A 2013 criminal trial later finds truck driver Afonso Dias guilty of Mendonça's kidnapping for which he serves a three-year jail sentence.
- 7–22 February – Portugal contests the 1998 Winter Olympics in Nagano with a delegation of two athletes: Fausto Marreiros in the men's speed skating and Mafalda Pereira in the women's freestyle skiing. Pereira's participation makes her the first female Portuguese athlete to compete at the Winter Olympics.
- 29 March – The Vasco da Gama Bridge across the Tagus river in Lisbon is inaugurated after three years of construction. Designed to alleviate congestion across the existing 25 de Abril Bridge, the 17.2-kilometre (10.7 mi) bridge opens as the longest structure of its kind in the Europe.
- 9 May – Portugal participates in the 1998 Eurovision Song Contest in Birmingham with Alma Lusa performing the song "Se Eu Te Pudesse Abraçar". The group finishes the competition in 12th place.
- 22 May–30 September – Lisbon hosts Expo '98, the first international fair ever held in Portugal, with the theme of "The Oceans: A Heritage for the Future". Approximately 11 million people visit over the course of the event, which sees the opening of the Lisbon Oceanarium, the largest of its kind in Europe, the Pavilhão Atlântico indoor arena, and the Gare do Oriente train station. The conclusion of the event also sees the establishment of a new commercial area, the Parque das Nações, on a brownfield site in the east of the capital.
- 28 June – A referendum on reforming abortion law is held with 51.1% of voters opposing a bill that would legalise abortions within the first 10 weeks of pregnancy. Although the low turnout of 31% falls short of the 50% threshold needed for the result to become legally binding, the government nevertheless withdraws the proposed measure from further parliamentary consideration. The referendum follows a vote in the Assembly in February in which MPs approved the measure before opponents of abortion, including the Catholic Church, successfully argued for the bill to be put to a public referendum.

=== July to December ===
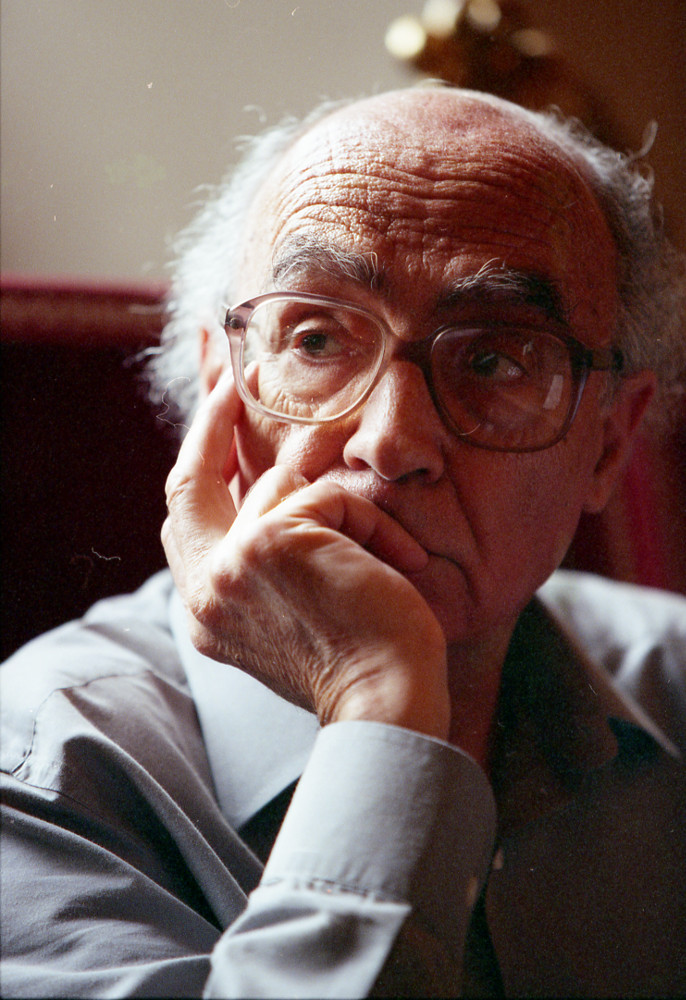
9 October: José Saramago (pictured in 1999) is awarded the Nobel Prize for Literature

- 9 July – An earthquake centered just north of Faial Island in the Azores kills at least ten people and leaves more than 90 injured. Approximately 1,000 people are additionally left without homes as the earthquake, measured at 5.8 on the Richter scale, causes damage across the archipelago.
- 6 August – A United Nations-sponsored dialogue between Foreign Minister Jaime Gama and his Indonesian counterpart Ali Alatas on the topic of East Timor ends after two days. Both sides express concordance for further discussions over greater autonomy for the region, which after having been part of the Portuguese Empire for more than four centuries, was occupied by Indonesia in 1976.
- 9 October – Author José Saramago is awarded the Nobel Prize for Literature. He is the first Portuguese-language writer to win the award.
- 8 November – A referendum on reorganising the administrative map of Portugal with the creation of eight regional assemblies is rejected by voters on a turnout of 48.3%. It is the second defeat for the government in a nationwide vote this year.

== Sport ==
In association football, for the first-tier league seasons, see 1997–98 Primeira Divisão and 1998–99 Primeira Divisão; for the Taça de Portugal seasons, see 1997–98 Taça de Portugal and 1998–99 Taça de Portugal.

- 24 May – Taça de Portugal Final

== Deaths ==
- 19 January – Maria Judite de Carvalho, author (born 1921).
- 24 March – António Ribeiro, clergyman, Patriarch of Lisbon (1971–1998) (born 1928).
- 26 October – José Cardoso Pires, writer (born 1925).

== See also ==
- 1998 in Portuguese television
