= 2017 Golden Globes (Portugal) =

Annual Portuguese awards ceremony

The 2017 Golden Globes (Portugal) was held on 21 May 2017 and broadcast by SIC and presented by João Manzarra.

== Winners and nominees ==
=== Cinema ===
Best Film:

- Cartas da Guerra - Ivo M. Ferreira
  - John From - João Nicolau
  - Cinzento e Negro - Luís Filipe Rocha
  - O Ornitólogo - João Pedro Rodrigues

Best Actor:

- Nuno Lopes - Posto Avançado de Progresso
  - Miguel Nunes - Cartas da Guerra
  - Miguel Borges - Cinzento e Negro
  - Filipe Duarte - Cinzento e Negro

Best Actress:

- Ana Padrão - Jogo de Damas
  - Mónica Calle - Cinzento e Negro
  - Joana Bárcia - Cinzento e Negro
  - Maria João Abreu - A Mãe é que Sabe

=== Theatre ===
Best Play:

- Música - Luís Miguel Cintra
  - Moçambique - Jorge Andrade
  - O Impromptu de Versalhes - Miguel Loureiro
  - Pinocchio - Bruno Bravo

Best Actor:

- João Perry - O Pai
  - João Pedro Mamede - Jardim Zoológico de Vidro
  - Pedro Almendra - Os Últimos Dias da Humanidade
  - Rúben Gomes - O Rio

Best Actress:

- Isabel Abreu - Um Diário de Preces
  - Beatriz Batarda - As Criadas
  - Luísa Cruz - Música
  - Rita Cabaço - Música

=== Fashion ===
Best Stylist:

- Luís Carvalho
  - Nuno Gama
  - Dino Alves
  - Carlos Gil

Best Male Model:

- Francisco Henriques - Central Models
  - Luís Borges - Central Models
  - Fernando Cabral - Karacter Agency
  - Fábio Tavares - Face Models

Best Female Model:

- Maria Clara - L'Agence
  - Sara Sampaio - Central Models
  - Marianne Bittencourt - Karacter Agency
  - Isilda - Central Models

=== Sports ===
Best Male Coach:

- Fernando Santos - Football
  - Rui Vitória - Football
  - José Uva - Athletics
  - Hélio Lucas e José Sousa - Canoeing

Best Male Athlete:

- Cristiano Ronaldo - Football
  - Ricardinho - Futsal
  - Madjer - Beach Soccer
  - Fernando Pimenta - Canoeing

Best Female Athlete:

- Telma Monteiro - Judo
  - Patrícia Mamona - Athletics
  - Teresa Bonvalot - Surf
  - Tamila Holub - Swimming

=== Music ===
Best Individual Performer:

- Carminho - O Amor é Assim
  - António Zambujo - Até Pensei Que Fosse Minha
  - Cristina Branco - Menina
  - Fábia Rebórdão - Falem Agora

Best Group:

- Capitão Fausto - Morro Na Praia
  - Dead Combo - Dead Combo e as Cordas da Má Fama
  - HMB - O Amor é Assim
  - Deolinda - Outras Histórias

Best Song:

- "O Amor é Assim" - HMB feat. Carminho
  - "Do You Know Wrong" - Richie Campbell
  - "Amor Maior" - Paulo Gonzo e Raquel Tavares
  - "Era Eu" - D.A.M.A

=== Best Newcomer ===
- Beatriz Frazão - Acting
  - April Ivy - Music
  - André Silva - Football
  - Renato Sanches - Football

=== Award of Merit and Excellence ===
- Fernando Santos
