= Sílvia Alberto =

Portuguese television presenter and actress

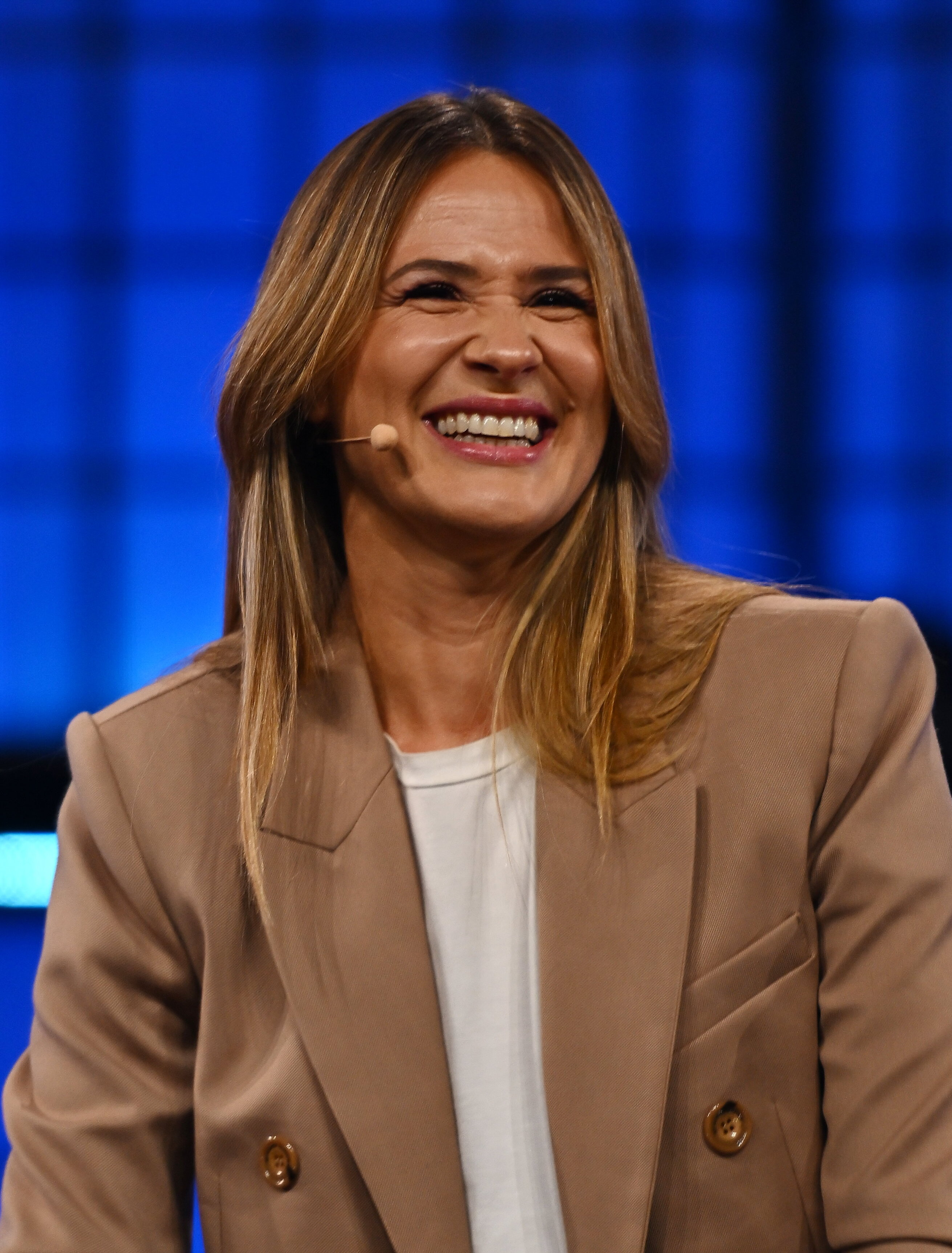
- Alberto in 2024
- Born: 18 May 1981 (age 44); Lisbon, Portugal
- Occupation: Television presenter
- Years active: 2000–present

Sílvia Alberto (born 18 May 1981) is a Portuguese television presenter and actress, currently employed by Rádio e Televisão de Portugal. Currently, she is the presenter of the talent show Got Talent Portugal, a program she has hosted since 2017 on the television channel RTP1.

She was one of the hosts of the 2018 Eurovision Song Contest in Lisbon, Portugal.

== Early life ==
She studied Theatre at the Lisbon Theatre and Film School.

== Career ==
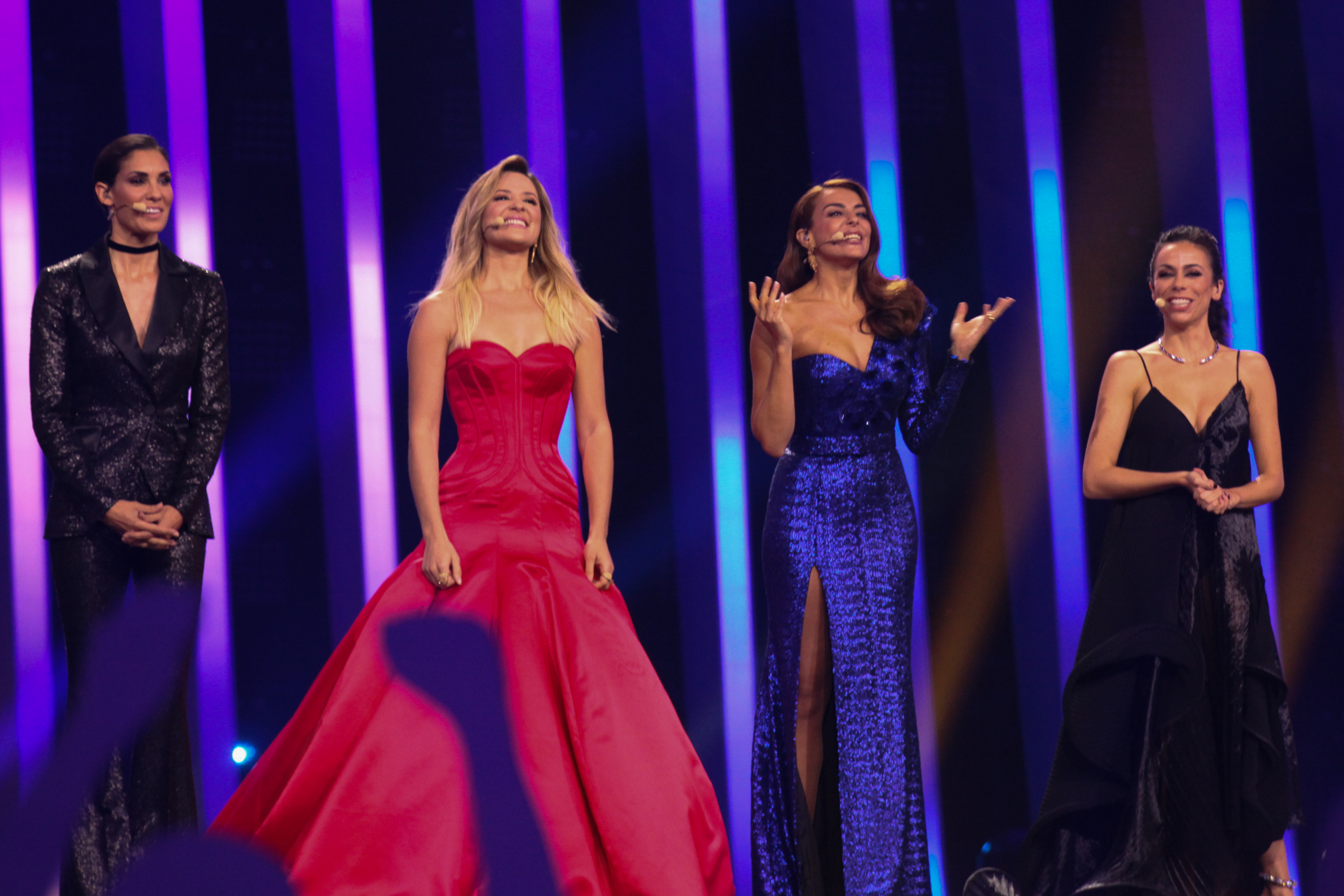
Alberto (centre left), along with her Eurovision Song Contest co-hosts, Filomena Cautela, Daniela Ruah, and Catarina Furtado.

Alberto is best known for hosting seven editions of Festival da Canção (Portuguese heats for the Eurovision Song Contest), Dança Comigo (Portuguese version of Strictly Come Dancing), Operação Triunfo, MasterChef, Top Chef and presenting the RTP talent programme Got Talent Portugal.

She also had a three-year stint with the Portuguese broadcaster SIC, where she co-hosted the first two series of Ídolos (based on the popular British show Pop Idol) and the 2004 Portuguese Golden Globes.

On 8 January 2018, she was announced as one of the four hosts of the 2018 Eurovision Song Contest alongside Filomena Cautela, Daniela Ruah, and Catarina Furtado.

== See also ==
- List of Eurovision Song Contest presenters
