= 1999 in Portugal =

- Centuries: 18th; 19th; 20th; 21st
- Decades: 1970s; 1980s; 1990s; 2000s; 2010s
- See also: List of years in Portugal

Events in the year 1999 in Portugal.

== Incumbents ==
- President: Jorge Sampaio
- Prime Minister: António Guterres (Socialist)

== Events ==
=== January to June ===
- 1 January – Portugal joins ten other European nations in officially adopting the euro currency. With euro banknotes and coins not set to be introduced until 2002, the escudo remains the sole physical currency nationwide at an exchange rate of one euro to 200.48 escudo.
- 28 February – The political party Left Bloc is formed from a merger of the People's Democratic Union, Politics XXI, and the Revolutionary Socialist Party.
- 6 May – An agreement between the Portuguese and Indonesian governments over the future of East Timor is signed by Foreign Minister Jaime Gama and his Indonesian counterpart Ali Alatas. The agreement allows East Timor, a former Portuguese colony occupied by Indonesia in 1975, to hold a referendum on whether to become an independent nation or remain an Indonesian province. Kofi Annan, the Secretary-General of the United Nations, hails the outcome as "a historic moment".
- 22 May – In association football, F.C. Porto secure the 1998-99 Primeira Divisão title ahead of rivals Boavista F.C. with one game of the season left to play, becoming the first club to win the Portuguese national championship five times in a row.
- 29 May – Portugal participates in the 1999 Eurovision Song Contest in Jerusalem with Rui Bandeira performing the song "Como tudo começou". Bandeira finishes the competition 21st of the 23 competing nations.
- 13 June – European Parliament election: The Socialist Party wins the highest number of votes and seats to maintain its position as the largest Portuguese party in the European Parliament. Turnout rises by almost 5% to 40.4%, with Portugal one of just four countries across the European Union to see increased participation compared to the last elections in 1994.
- 19 June – In association football, Beira-Mar defeat Campomaiorense to win the final of the Taça de Portugal held at the Estádio Nacional in Lisbon. It is the first time the club has won the competition.

=== July to December ===
- 18 July – A preliminary parliamentary report examining the death of Prime Minister Francisco Sa Carneiro in a 1980 plane crash is leaked, in which it is suggested that the incident, originally blamed on pilot error and technical issues, was the result of a bomb explosion co-ordinated by the right-wing group Commandos for the Defence of Western Civilisation.
- 9 October – The state funeral of singer Amália Rodrigues, known as "The Queen of Fado", takes place in Lisbon's Estrela Basilica three days after her death at the age of 79. Among those present at the ceremony are President Jorge Sampaio and Prime Minister António Guterres, with thousands of mourners attending the subsequent funeral procession from the Estrela Basilica to Prazeres Cemetery.
- 10 October – Legislative election: The governing Socialist Party led by Prime Minister António Guterres wins the highest number of seats in the Assembly, but fails to secure an overall majority after winning exactly half of the 230 seats available. With 44.4% of the vote, the Party achieves its highest vote share in an Assembly election since the Carnation Revolution. The centre-right Social Democratic Party led by José Manuel Barroso finishes as the largest opposition party with 81 seats and 32.6% of the vote. Turnout falls to 61.9%, the lowest recorded since Portugal's return to democracy in 1974.
- 12 October – Portugal is awarded the hosting rights of the UEFA Euro 2004 association football tournament. The event is set to be the largest competition of its kind to take place in the country since the 1991 FIFA World Youth Championship, and will feature matches in eight cities: Lisbon, Porto, Aveiro, Braga, Coimbra, Guimarães, Leiria, and Faro-Loulé.
- 11 December – Thirty-five people are killed when a SATA Air Açores-operated plane crashes while en route between Ponta Delgada and Horta in the Azores. Pilot error is later blamed as the main factor for the incident in a report published in 2001.
- 19 and 20 December – Macau is peacefully handed over to the People's Republic of China as a Special Administrative Region, bringing to a close more than 400 years of Portuguese rule and marking the end of European colonial presence in Asia, and historically ending the Portuguese Empire.

== Sport ==
In association football, for the first-tier league seasons, see 1998–99 Primeira Divisão and 1999–2000 Primeira Liga; for the Taça de Portugal seasons, see 1998–99 Taça de Portugal and 1999–2000 Taça de Portugal.

== Births ==
- 25 June – Messias Baptista, Olympic sprint canoeist (2020).
- 9 July – Maria Martins, cyclist.
- 10 November – João Félix, footballer.

== Deaths ==
- 7 June – António Livramento, roller hockey player (born 1943).
- 3 August – Alexandre Maria Pinheiro Torres, writer and literary critic (born 1923).
- 10 August – Ernesto Melo Antunes, military official and politician (born 1933).
- 6 October – Amalia Rodrigues, fado singer (born 1920).
