= Filomena Cautela =

Portuguese television presenter and actress (born 1984)

- Cautela in 2026
- Born: Filomena José Dias Fernandes Cautela; 16 December 1984 (age 41); Torres Novas, Portugal
- Occupations: Actress and television presenter
- Years active: 2000–present

Filomena José Dias Fernandes Cautela (born 16 December 1984) is a Portuguese television presenter and actress. Cautela started her acting career in the theatre in the year 2000. In 2004, she made her debut in cinema, and in 2005, she was cast as a presenter by MTV Portugal.

== Career ==
Cautela continued acting for both theatre and cinema whilst her television presenter career took her to different TV stations and new shows. She has been hosting the late prime talk show 5 Para A Meia-Noite on RTP since 2015. Among other projects she was the Green Room presenter on the Portuguese national final for the Eurovision Song Contest, Festival da Canção in 2017, as well as the Portuguese jury spokesperson in the Eurovision Song Contest 2017. She has been one of the hosts of Festival da Canção in every edition since 2017.

On 8 January 2018, Cautela was announced as one of the four hosts of the Eurovision Song Contest 2018 alongside Sílvia Alberto, Daniela Ruah, and Catarina Furtado. It was confirmed on 4 May 2018 that Cautela would host the Green Room.

== Filmography ==
=== Television ===
Channel	Year	Title	Role	Notes
TVI	2003–2004	Morangos Com Açúcar	Carla Santos Silva	
TVI	2003	Ana e os Sete	Sandra	Main cast
TVI	2004	Inspector Max		Recurring cast
TVI	2005	Mundo Meu	Sylvie	Guest cast
RTP1	2006	Bocage	Ana Perpétua	
MTV	2005—2006		Herself	Presenter/VJ
SIC	2007	Vingança	Érica	Main cast
SIC	2007	Aqui Não Há Quem Viva	Ângela	Guest cast
TVI	2008	Casos da Vida	Marta	Main cast - Episode «Saldo Negativo»
RTP1	2008	Conta-me como foi	Glória	Guest cast
SIC	2008	Chiquititas	Antonieta	Guest cast
RTP2, RTP1	2009–2011; 2015–2020	5 Para A Meia-Noite	Herself	Presenter
RTP1	2010	Cidade Despida	Joana	Recurring cast
RTP1	2010	República	Marta	
RTP2	2011	Fá-las Curtas	Herself	Presenter
RTP1	2012	Depois do Adeus		Recurring cast
RTP1, RTP2, RTP Play	2012–present	Music festivals coverage on RTP	Herself	Presenter
Globo Premium	2008–2014	Cá Estamos	Herself	Presenter
RTP2	2013–2014	Agora	Herself	Presenter
RTP2	2015	Palcos Agora	Herself	Presenter
TVI	2015–2016	Santa Bárbara	Maria Ana	Main cast
RTP1	2016	Volta ao Mundo 2016: Passagem de Ano	Herself	Presenter
RTP1	2016–2017	Ministério do Tempo	Mafalda Torres	Main cast
TVI	2017	Inspetor Max		Guest cast
RTP1	2018	Eurovision Song Contest 2018	Presenter	Green room
RTP1	2019	I Love Portugal	Presenter	
RTP1	2019-2020	Jogo de Todos os Jogos	Presenter	
RTP1	2020	Quem Quer Ser Milionario? Alta Pressão	Presenter	

== See also ==
- List of Eurovision Song Contest presenters
