= Gonçalo Teixeira (model) =

Portuguese model (born 1988)

- Born: Gonçalo Viriato Teixeira; August 20, 1988 (age 38); Lisbon, Portugal
- Modeling information
- Height: 1.82 m (6 ft 0 in)
- Hair color: Brown
- Eye color: Blue
- Agency: Central Models (Portugal)

Gonçalo Teixeira (born August 20, 1988) is a Portuguese model best known for working with Guess, as well as his appearance in Emporio Armani 2009.

He has appeared in magazines such as Men's Health and GQ. He won a Portuguese Golden Globe in 2011 and 2012 for Best Male Model.

== Career ==
Gonçalo Teixeira became known after winning the 2005 Portuguese Elite Model Look contest. In 2012, he was selected for the cover of the April edition of Portuguese Men's Health and to be the face of the international advertising campaign for Guess Accessories, Spring 2012, which was photographed by Ralf Pulmanns in Los Angeles. He also appeared in the Guess Spring 12 campaign, alongside Gigi Hadid and Natasha Barnard which was photographed in Bora Bora.

== Awards ==
- Best Male Model, Vogue Portugal Fashion Awards 2012
- Golden Globe Award Portugal 2011 and 2012 for Best Male Model
