= Luís Buchinho =

Portuguese fashion designer

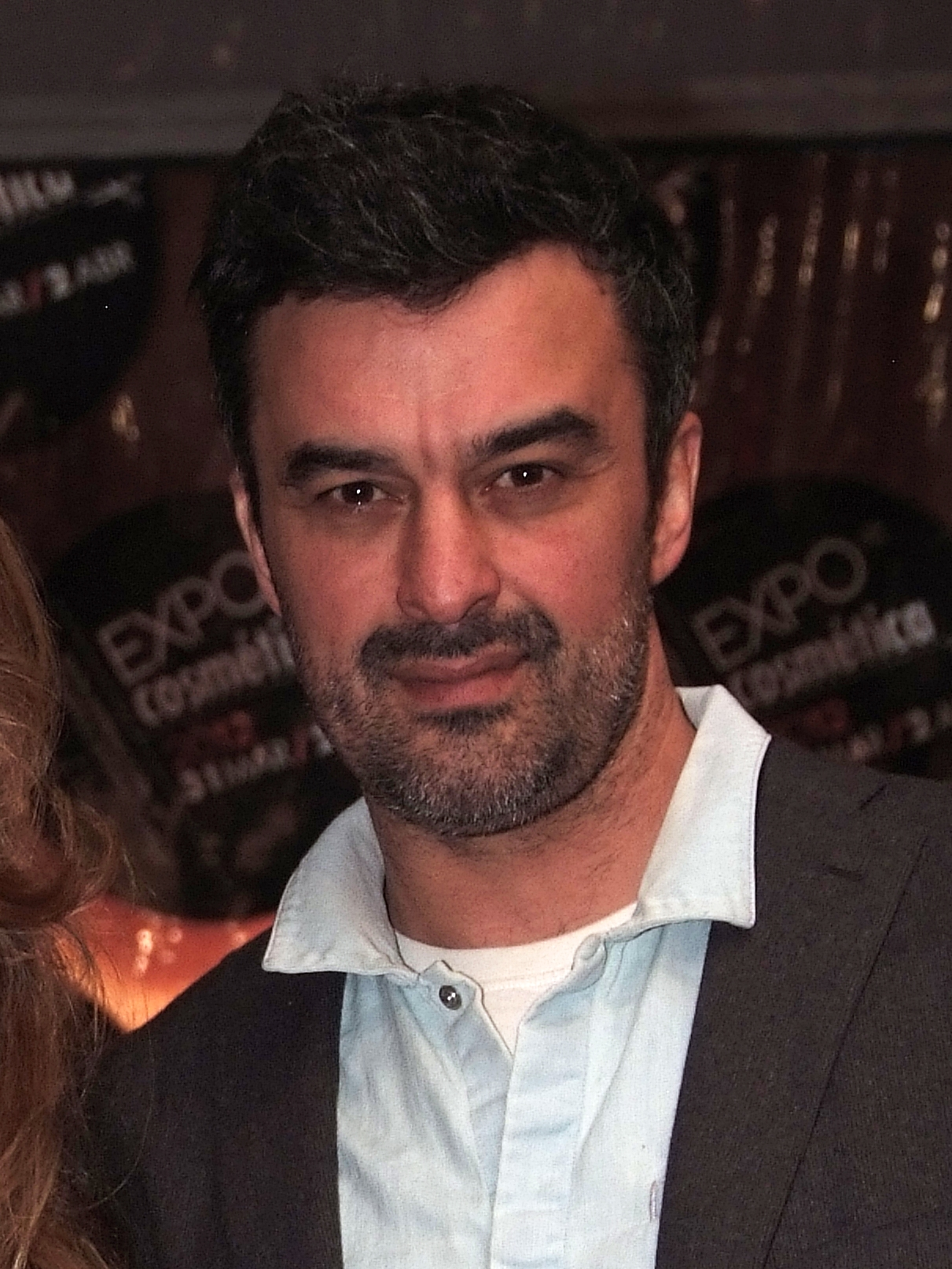
- Born: 1969 (age 56–57); Setúbal, Portugal
- Occupation: Fashion designer

Luís Buchinho (born in Setúbal, 1969) is a Portuguese fashion designer. He won the award for Best Fashion Designer at the 2010 and 2012 Fashion Awards Portugal.

== Early life ==
Buchinho completed the Fashion Design course at Citex (now known as Modatex) in 1989 and has taught at the course since then. He has been showing his collections at Portugal Fashion since its first edition in 1995, as well as at shows in New York, São Paulo and Paris.

== Awards ==
He also won the award for Best Fashion Designer at the 16th Globos de Ouro in 2011 and he was again nominated for the same award the following year.
