= Depois do Adeus =

- Genre: Historical, drama
- Starring: Ana Nave; José Carlos Garcia; Diogo Infante; Ana Padrão; João Reis
- Country of origin: Portugal
- Original language: Portuguese
- No. of seasons: 1
- No. of episodes: 26

Production
- Production company: SPTV

Original release
- Network: RTP1
- Release: January 2013 – present

Depois do Adeus is a Portuguese historical drama series set in the mid 1970s.

== Cast ==
- Ana Nave
- José Carlos Garcia
- Diogo Infante
- Ana Padrão
- João Reis
