= João Pedro Pais =

Portuguese singer and musician (born 1971)

João Pedro Pais (born 20 September 1971) is a singer and musician from Portugal.

== Discography ==
- Segredos (1997)
- Outra Vez (1999)
- Falar por Sinais (2001)
- Tudo Bem (2004)
- Lado a Lado with Mafalda Veiga (2006)
- A Palma e a Mão (2008)
- O Coliseu (2010)
- Desassossego (2012)
- Identidade (2015)
- 20 Anos (2017)
- Confidências (de um homem vulgar) (2019)
- Amor Urbano (2022)
