= Call Girl (2007 film) =

- Film poster
- Directed by: António-Pedro Vasconcelos
- Starring: Soraia Chaves; Nicolau Breyner; Ivo Canelas; Joaquim de Almeida
- Release date: 2007
- Language: Portuguese

Call Girl is a 2007 Portuguese film directed by António-Pedro Vasconcelos starring Soraia Chaves, Nicolau Breyner, Ivo Canelas and Joaquim de Almeida. It was the highest-grossing Portuguese film in 2007.

== Cast ==
- Soraia Chaves as Maria
- Ivo Canelas as Madiera
- Nicolau Breyner as Carlos Meireles
- Joaquim de Almeida as Mouros
- Jose Raposo as Neves
- Jose Eduardo as Gomes
- Maria Joao Abreu as Amalia
- Custodia Gallego as Odete
- Ana Padrao as Ines
- Virgilio Castelo as Health Minister
- Luis Mascarenhas as Matos
- Sofia Grillo as Luisa
- Daniela Faria as Helga
- Raul Solnado as Jacinto
- Joaquim Leitao as Andrade
- Anton Skrzypiciel as Empresario
- Margarida Penedo as Ingrid
- Keith Davis as Joseph
- Isabel Ribas as D. Alice
- Paula Caracoleiro as Police Inspector
- Halima Abboud as Stripper (credited as Halima)
- Ana Videira as Spa Receptionist
- Hugo Rodrigues as Mouros' Lover
- Martim Varela as Joao (credited as Martim Plantier Varela)
- Mariana de Gusmano as Palmira
- Jose Favinha Franco as Alvaro Meireles
