= Portugal Fashion =

Portuguese fashion industry event

Portugal Fashion is a Portuguese fashion event and designer-support project established in 1995 by the National Association of Young Entrepreneurs (ANJE). Based in Porto, it organizes fashion presentations in Portugal and supports Portuguese designers at international fashion weeks.

== See also ==
- Dress code
- Portuguese culture
