= Delfins =

Portuguese pop rock band

- Origin: Cascais, Portugal
- Genres: Pop rock
- Years active: 1984–2009; 2019 - present
- Past members: Miguel Ângelo; Rui Fadigas; Fernando Cunha; Silvestre Magalhães; Pedro Molkov; João Carlos Magalhães

Delfins was a Portuguese pop-rock band, from Cascais. Its lead vocalist was Miguel Ângelo. Other members of the group were Rui Fadigas, Fernando Cunha, Silvestre Magalhães, Pedro Molkov and João Carlos Magalhães. The band was one of the major pop-rock music groups in Portugal in the 90s, and made various appearances in the Portuguese National Finals for the Eurovision Song Contest.

In 1998, the Delfins contributed "Canção De Engate (In Variações Memory Remix)" to the AIDS benefit compilation album Onda Sonora: Red Hot + Lisbon produced by the Red Hot Organization.

The Band sold more than half a million records, and in 2009 the group officially announced a permanent band retirement. They would revive the project in 2019 for concerts.

== Albums ==
- 1987 Libertação
- 1988 U outro lado existe
- 1990 Desalinhados
- 1993 Ser Maior-uma história natural
- 1994 Breve Sumário da História de Deus
- 1996 Saber a Mar
- 1998 Azul
- 2000 Del7ins
- 2002 Babilónia
- 2005 De Corpo e Alma (Live)

== Singles ==
- 1984 Letras
- 1985 A Casa da Praia (é apenas um sentimento)
- 1987 O Caminho da Felicidade
- 1988 1 Lugar ao Sol
- 1988 Bandeira
- 1991 Se eu pudesse um Dia
- 1993 Ao Passar um Navio
- 1993 Ser Maior
- 1995 A Queda de um Anjo
- 1997 Saber a Mar
- 2000 Hoje
- 2000 Vive

== Compilations ==
- 1995 O Caminho da Felicidade - O melhor dos Delfins
- 2003 O Caminho da Felicidade 2

== See also ==
- List of best-selling albums in Portugal
