= Joaquim Leitão =

Portuguese film director

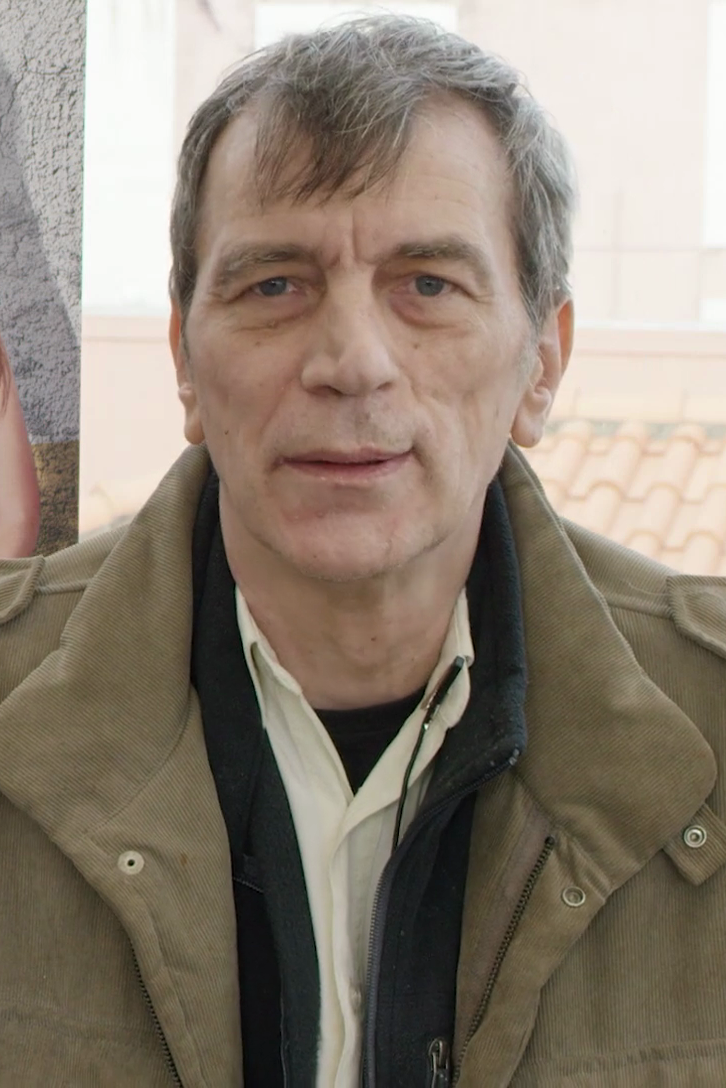
Joaquim Leitão

Joaquim Leitão, ComIH, OM (born 1956) is a Portuguese film director. He won two Golden Globe Awards, in 1996 for Adão e Eva and in 1998 for Tentação.

== Life ==
He studied law at the University of Lisbon, but changed to directing films. In the 1980s he directed several short films and music videos. In 1994 he wrote Uma Cidade Qualquer for the European Capital of Culture. He followed this with Adão e Eva (1995), whose cast included Joaquim de Almeida and Maria de Medeiros in the roles of two commercial television media figures, and for which he received two "Globos de Ouro" (Portuguese Golden Globes): Best Picture and Best Director. With Tentação (Temptation) (1997) he got one of the biggest commercial successes of the Portuguese cinema, and then, he directed Inferno (Hell) (1999), the series Until Tomorrow Comrades (2005) - adapted from the work of the same name by Álvaro Cunhal - and 20,13 Purgatório (Purgatory) (2006).

Joaquim Leitão also participated in several films as an actor, notably in films by Fernando Lopes, Ruy Guerra and António Pedro Vasconcelos. He was awarded the Commander of the Order of Prince Henry, by the President of the Republic Jorge Sampaio in 2005.

== Filmography ==
- O fim da inocência (2017)
- Sei Lá (2014)
- Quarta Divisão (2013)
- A Esperança Está Onde Menos Se Espera (2009)
- 20,13 Purgatório (2006)
- Até Amanhã, Camaradas (miniseries) (2005)
- Capitães de Abril (2000)
- Inferno (1999)
- Tentação (1997)
- Adão e Eva (1995)
- Uma Vida Normal (1994)
- Uma Cidade Qualquer (1994)
- Ao Fim da Noite (1991)
- O Resgate (1990)
- A Ilha (1990)
- Voltar (1988)
- Duma Vez por Todas (1986)
