= Leonel Vieira =

Portuguese film director and producer (born 1969)

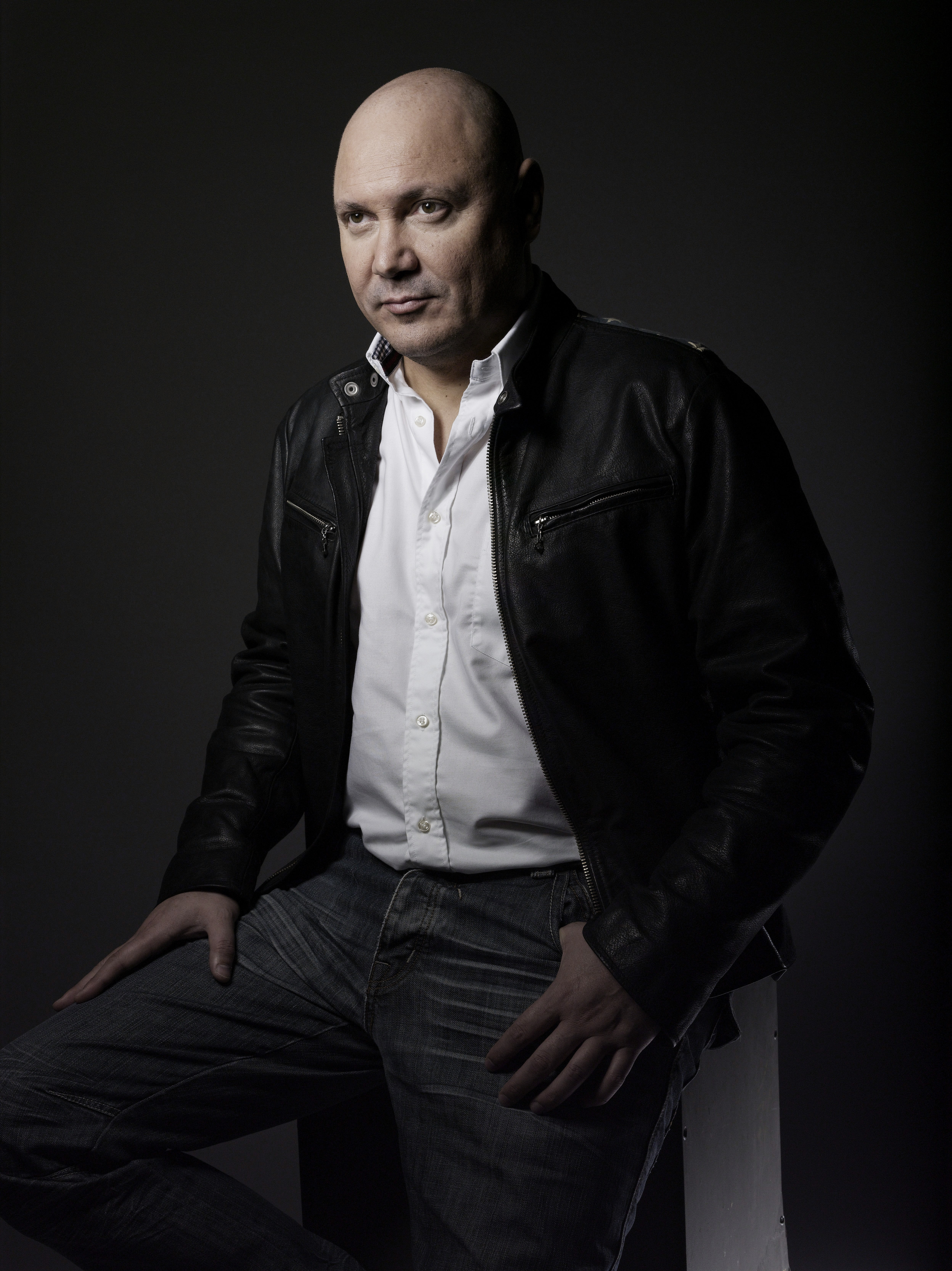
- Born: 1969 (age 56–57); Miranda do Douro, Portugal
- Occupations: Director; producer

Leonel Vieira (born 1969) is a Portuguese film director and producer. He is one of the most successful Portuguese directors/producers and of greatest international recognition. He has made 11 feature films, some of which are in the top 10 of the most watched Portuguese films ever and have the largest box-office in cinema in Portugal.

== Biography ==
His first film, "A Sombra dos Abutres", selected for more than 50 international festivals, remains his reference film for critics.

As a producer he has developed partnerships with production companies in Brazil, Spain, France and USA, having produced more than 30 films and television series, as well as more than 200 advertising spots for major brands.

Since 1998 he has been present in more than 100 international festivals, having received more than 20 awards in the areas of cinema and advertising. In Portugal he has collected several awards and distinctions at the Clube dos Criativos (the most important advertising awards in Portugal). In 2008, with Vodafone, he was short-listed at the LIA Awards (London).

In 2008, Leonel Vieira was selected as "Producer on the Move" by Cannes Festival. In 2015, he was considered Personality of the Year in the Arts and was the cover of Forbes magazine in January 2016, in Portugal.

In 2017, Leonel Vieira was president of the Association of Film and Audiovisual Producers in Portugal. Since 2020 he has been part of the Scientific and Technical Commission of the Audiovisual and Multimedia course at the Escola Superior de Comunicação Social.

In 2019, Leonel Vieira was invited to the Shanghai International Film Festival as a jury for cinema and the Magnolia television awards. In the same year, Leonel Vieira co-produced the well-known Chinese animation series "The Panda and the Rooster".

== Filmography ==
=== Film ===
| Year | Title | Credits | Observations |
|---|---|---|---|
| 1998 | A Sombra dos Abutres | Director | |
| 1998 | Zona J | Director | Globo de Ouro in 1999 (Portugal) for Best Picture |
| 2002 | A Bomba | Director | |
| 2002 | A Selva | Director / Executive Producer | |
| 2005 | Um Tiro no Escuro | Director | |
| 2006 | La Noche de Los Girasoles | Producer | |
| 2006 | Filme da Treta | Producer | |
| 2007 | O Julgamento | Director / Producer | |
| 2008 | Arte de Roubar | Director / Producer | |
| 2011 | Budapeste | Producer | |
| 2012 | O Sexo dos Anjos | Producer | |
| 2014 | La Vida Inesperada | Producer | |
| 2015 | O Duelo | Producer | |
| 2015 | A Estrada 47 | Producer | |
| 2015 | O Pátio das Cantigas | Director / Producer | Remake 1942 |
| 2015 | O Leão da Estrela | Director / Producer | Remake 1947 |
| 2016 | A Canção de Lisboa | Director / Producer | Remake 1933 |
| 2017 | Perdidos | Producer | |
| 2017 | Alguém Como Eu | Director / Producer | |
| 2019 | Tiro e Queda | Producer | |
| 2019 | La Pequenã Suiza | Producer | |
| 2020 | O Último Animal | Director / Producer | |
| 2021 | El Cover | Producer | |

=== Television ===
| Year | Title | Credit |
|---|---|---|
| 1998 | Ballet Rose | Director |
| 2000 | Mustang | Director |
| 2001 | O Espírito da Lei | Executive Producer |
| 2009 | Conexão | Director / Producer |
| 2011 | Tempo Final | Director / Producer |
| 2011 | Barcelona Cidade Neutral | Producer |
| 2012 | Red Brazil | Producer |
| 2013 | Os Filhos do Rock | Producer |
| 2017 | Filha da Lei | Producer |
| 2017 | País Irmão | Producer |
| 2019 | Teorias da Conspiração | Producer |
| 2019 | O Panda e o Galo | Producer |
