= April Captains =

2000 film by Maria de Medeiros

Capitães de Abril
- Directed by: Maria de Medeiros
- Written by: Maria de Medeiros; Ève Deboise
- Produced by: Marianne Dumoulin; Gerardo Fernandes; Rui Louro
- Starring: Stefano Accorsi; Maria de Medeiros; Joaquim de Almeida; Frédéric Pierrot
- Cinematography: Michel Abramowicz
- Edited by: Jacques Witta
- Music by: António Victorino de Almeida
- Distributed by: Lusomundo
- Release date: 21 April 2000
- Running time: 123 minutes
- Countries: France; Portugal; Spain; Italy
- Language: Portuguese

April Captains (Portuguese: Capitães de Abril) is a 2000 film telling the story of the Carnation Revolution, the military coup that overthrew the corporatist dictatorship (known as the Estado Novo) in Portugal on 25 April 1974. Although dramatised, the plot is closely based on the events of the revolution and many of the key characters are real - such as Captain Salgueiro Maia and Prime Minister Marcelo Caetano.

This European co-production was directed by Maria de Medeiros. It was screened in the Un Certain Regard section at the 2000 Cannes Film Festival.

== Plot ==
The film opens on the evening of 24 April 1974, as a young conscript soldier (Daniel) kisses farewell to his girlfriend (Rosa) before boarding a train from Lisbon back to his Army base at Santarém. Both are fearful that he will be sent to fight in the Portuguese Colonial War. Late and depressed, Rosa then travels by tram to left-wing journalist/lecturer Antónia's flat to babysit for her daughter Amelia. On arriving back (late) at his base, Daniel is oblivious to the imminent coup. Captain Salgueiro Maia arrests the base commander at gunpoint and orders the soldiers to assemble on parade in the middle of the night; he asks them to come with him to Lisbon to overthrow the government. Maia's erudite but cynical and cautious colleague Major Gervásio refuses to take part, as does Lieutenant Lobão.

Meanwhile, in Lisbon, Antónia is having a row with her estranged husband Manuel, a Portuguese Army captain, over atrocities he has been involved with during the Colonial War. Rosa having arrived to babysit, Antónia then goes to a formal reception where she pleads with her brother Filipe Correia, a minister in the government, to release one of her students who had been arrested by the DGS (secret police). He refuses to help. The head of the DGS (Salieri) is also present at the reception; he recognises Antónia and subsequently assaults her in a toilet. Antónia returns home in despair, not realizing that Manuel is also a coup plotter. Manuel and his colleagues prepare to seize control of the Rádio Clube Português, a radio station, from which communiques on behalf of the Armed Forces Movement will be broadcast.

Meanwhile, simultaneously, Maia and his troops are preparing to set off for Lisbon, and the other coup plotters are also preparing to move into position. The signal for the coup to start is the playing of Grândola, Vila Morena on the radio shortly after midnight on 25 April. Maia's troops set off in a column of armoured vehicles. Manuel, Fonseca, Botelho and Silva capture the Rádio Clube Português in Lisbon. A signal is given in morse code by car headlights to prisoners being held in prison by the DGS. Maia's armoured column has to stop in open countryside due to a breakdown by one of the key armoured vehicles; at this point Major Gervásio arrives in a conspicuous red sports car and joins the rebels. Maia's troops arrive in the Praça do Comércio in Lisbon, but are threatened by a warship and by a column of tanks commanded by Brigadier Pais, who is loyal to the regime. Following a stand-off, with Lobão and Maia both threatened with being shot, many of Pais's troops defect to the rebels. On entering the Government offices in the Praça do Comércio, Maia discovers that the ministers have fled to the Republican National Guard headquarters at Carmo in Lisbon. There are several asides, including where the young conscript soldier in the opening scenes of the film meets Rosa again, placing a carnation in the barrel of his rifle (and are later discovered inside a military armoured car whilst making love).

At the GNR barracks, a further stand-off ensues, with the regime leaders (including Marcelo Caetano) trapped inside. Also trapped in their nearby headquarters, a group of DGS officers open fire from the windows at the crowd in the street outside, killing four - the only fatalities of the Carnation Revolution. Virgílio, a man who Manuel and his colleagues got into a bar fight with earlier in the film, is one of the casualties. Maia eventually orders his troops to shoot at the building with machine-gun fire and threatens to shell the building.

Shortly before Maia's deadline expires, emissaries from General António de Spínola arrive to negotiate the surrender of the regime's leaders. Spínola himself arrives, places Gervásio in local command (despite Gervásio having spent almost the entire day avoiding any action) and orders Maia to convey the arrested Caetano, Correia and the other leaders to an air force base, from where they are flown to Madeira and then on to exile in Brazil. The film closes with the release of the political prisoners, including Antónia's lover (Emílio), and Manuel and Maia narrowly avoid being attacked by a crowd when they are mistaken for DGS/PIDE officers rather than soldiers.

It is then revealed that Antónia and Emílio will both go into politics, she on the left but he ultimately on the centre-right; after two years together they separate. Manuel will drift into alcoholism and Maia was to die from cancer in his late 40s. Nevertheless, the revolution leads to the downfall of the Estado Novo regime and its replacement by democracy and the rule of law in Portugal.

== Cast ==
- Stefano Accorsi as Captain Salgueiro Maia
- Maria de Medeiros as Antónia
- Joaquim de Almeida as Major Gervásio
- Frédéric Pierrot as Manuel (Antónia's estranged husband)
- Fele Martínez as Lieutenant Lobão
- Manuel João Vieira as Fonseca
- Marcantónio del Carlo as Silva
- Emmanuel Salinger as Botelho
- Rita Durão as Rosa
- Manuel Manquiña as Gabriel
- Duarte Guimarães as Daniel
- Manuel Lobão as Fernandes (an army officer serving under Maia and also supportive of the revolution)
- Luís Miguel Cintra as Brigadier Pais
- Joaquim Leitão as Filipe (brother of Antónia and a minister in the Estado Novo government)
- Henrique Canto e Castro as Salieri (head of the DGS)
- Rogério Samora as Rui Gama
- Pedro Hestnes as Emilio (a student detained by the DGS/PIDE and Antónia's lover)
- Marcello Urgeghe as Radio announcer
- José Airosa as Paulo Ruivo
- José Boavida as Radio station technician
- António Capelo as Chamarro (an army officer loyal to the Estado Novo regime)
- Ruy de Carvalho as General António de Spínola
- Ricardo Pais as Marcelo Caetano
- José Eduardo as Virgilio (an elderly left-wing artist and depicted as one of the four victims shot dead by the DGS/PIDE during the Carnation Revolution)
- Peter Michael da Silva as Pedro
- Raquel Mariano as Amélia (daughter of Antónia)
- Horácio Santos as Cesário (a photographer)
- João Reis as voice of Salgueiro Maia

== Reception ==
The film performed well in Portugal with more than 110,000 admissions in its first five weeks.
