= Vítor Norte =

Portuguese actor (born 1951)

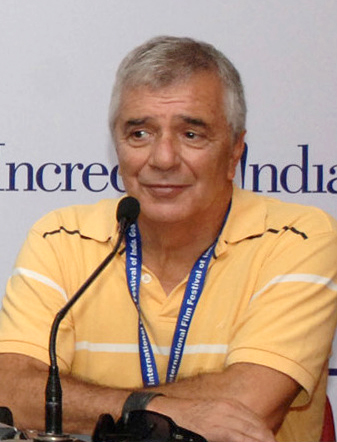
- Norte in 2011
- Born: 29 January 1951 (age 74); Borba, Portugal
- Occupation: Actor
- Children: 2

Vítor Norte (born 29 January 1951) is a Portuguese actor. He won the Portuguese Golden Globe award for best actor three times.

In 2002, he appeared in, and won, season 2 of the Portuguese reality television show Celebrity Big Brother.

== Biography ==
Vitor left the Escola Industrial e Comercial de Estremoz (Industrial and Commercial school in Extremoz), to settle in Lisbon, when he was seventeen. He had multiple jobs, including truck driver helper and secretarial work. He had classic ballet classes with Ana Mascollo, did mimics workshops in the Calouste Gulbenkian Foundation, and began his work as an actor in the Casa da Comédia (house of comedy). During the Portuguese Colonial War, he was called to do his military service and he was for two years in what was then Portuguese Guinea (Guinea Bissau after independence from Portugal).

From his career in the theatre, his notable performances include in Ay Carmela from the author José Sanchis Sinisterra, directed by Xosé Blanco Gil in Teatro Ibérico; Volpone of Ben Johnson, directed by Norberto Barroca in Teatro Aberto; Às Seis o Mais Tardar of M. Perrier, with Alexandre de Sousa in Instituto Franco Português; Horácios e Curiácios of Bertolt Brecht, with Antonino Solmer; Auto da Barca do Inferno of Gil Vicente, by Carlos Avilez; Os Quatro Cubos of Fernando Arrabal, by Herlander Peyroteo; Jogos de Praia of Whitehead, with João Canijo.

He started on TV in Vila Faia (RTP, 1982), after which he worked in series and mini-series like Rua Sésamo – The Sesame Street- (1990), Cluedo (1995), Alentejo Sem Lei (1990), Os Melhores Anos (1990), O Bairro da Fonte (SIC, 2000) or Capitão Roby (SIC, 2000); telemovies – Mustang of Leonel Vieira and Monsanto of Ruy Guerra; soap-operas (2007 – Ilha dos Amores, 2005 – Ninguém como Tu, 2003 – Queridas Feras, 2001 – Ganância, 1995 – Desencontros, 1994 – Na Paz dos Anjos).

With a regular presence in the cinema, he began in 1982 in A Vida é Bela, of Luís Galvão Telles. Collaborated with directors like Jorge Silva Melo, Luís Alvarães or José Fonseca e Costa, who would direct Vitor in Cinco Dias, Cinco Noites (1995), one of his most significant performances. With the same director he also did A Mulher do Próximo (1988), Os Cornos de Cronos (1992) and O Fascínio (2003). To be noticed No Dia dos Meus Anos by João Botelho, Ao Sul (1995) by Fernando Matos Silva, Sapatos Pretos (1998) by João Canijo, Jaime (1999) by António Pedro Vasconcelos, Respirar Debaixo de Água (2000) by António Ferreira, O Gotejar da Luz (2002) by Fernando Vendrell, A Mulher Polícia (2003) by Joaquim Sapinho, Tarde Demais (2000) and Os Lobos (2008) by José Nascimento.

He was distinguished with two Golden Globes in the Best Cinema Actor in 1999 (Jaime, de António Pedro Vasconcelos); in 2000 (Tarde Demais, by José Nascimento); 2002 (O Gotejar da Luz, by Fernando Vendrell). He received in 1996 the Troféu Nova Gente as Best Actor for his performance in Cinco Dias, Cinco Noites by Fonseca e Costa (1996).

Vitor has two children, Diogo and Sara Norte.

== Selected filmography ==
Film
Year	Title	Role	Notes
2012	O Cônsul de Bordéus		
1999	Jaime		
1996	Five Days, Five Nights		
1992	Amor e Dedinhos de Pé	Leopoldo	
1987	Agosto		
