= Ana Bustorff =

Portuguese actress

Ana Bustorff (born 15 November 1959 in Miragaia, Porto) is a Portuguese actress. She appeared in more than eighty films since 1980. She also appears in the TV soap opera 'A Única Mulher'.

== Selected filmography ==
Film
Year	Title	Role	Notes
1987	Agosto		
1997	Tentação		
1998	Zona J		
2004	Portugal S.A.		
2005	Alice		
2005	O Crime do Padre Amaro		
2022	Will-o'-the-Wisp (Fogo-Fátuo)		

TV
Year	Title	Role	Notes
2005	Pedro e Inês		
