= Beatriz Batarda =

British-Portuguese actress (born 1974)

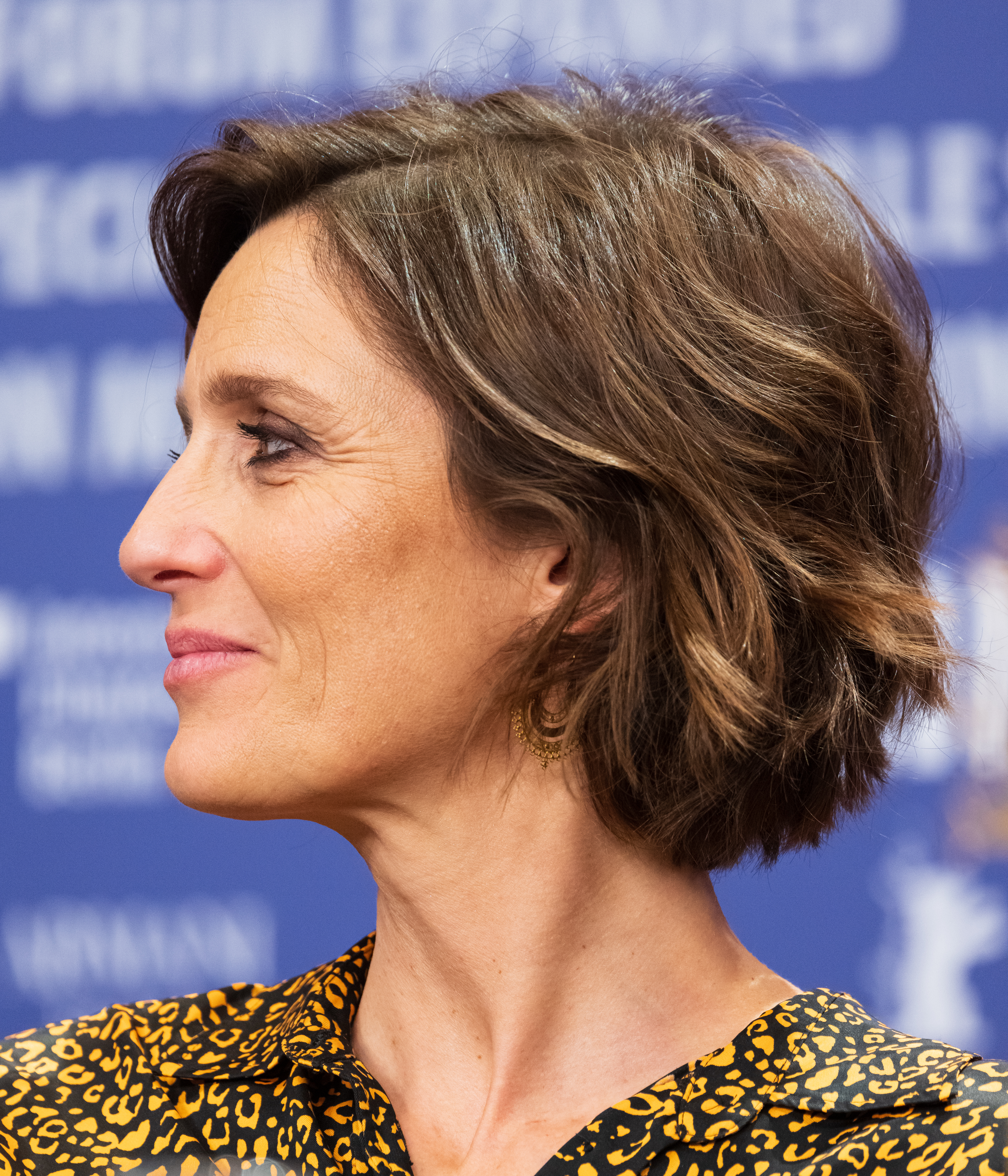
- Beatriz Batarda, 2023
- Born: Beatriz da Silveira Moreno Batarda; 11 April 1974 (age 51); London, England
- Occupation: Actress
- Years active: 1988; 1993–present
- Spouse: Bernardo Sassetti (died 2012)
- Partner: Bruno Nogueira (2013–present)
- Children: 3

Beatriz da Silveira Moreno Batarda Fernandes (born 1 April 1974) is a British-born Portuguese actress named as one of European films 'Shooting Stars' by European Film Promotion in 1998. She studied design at IADE Institute in Lisbon and trained in acting at Guidhall School of Music and Drama in London.

== Early life and career ==
She was born in London on 1 April 1974 and grew up in Lisbon, daughter of painter Eduardo Batarda, who was born in Coimbra, in 1943, where he attended the medical school since 1960 before dropping out three years later. He then studied painting at the Lisbon School of Fine Arts (1963-1968). With a scholarship from the Calouste Gulbenkian Foundation, her father studied at the Royal College of Art in London between 1971 and 1974, where Beatriz Batarda would eventually born. She has worked with Lisbon's Cornucópia Company as well as with the Teatro Nacional D.Maria, where she played Berenice, Fedra, Miss Hilda Wangel, Iphygenia and Miss Julie. In 2000, Batarda graduated from London's Guildhall School of Music and Drama with an honours degree in acting. She was awarded a gold medal for Best Actress of the Year and appeared on stage in London in Beyond a Joke by Christopher Morahan and Love Labour's Lost directed by Stephen Unwin. Her first film appearance was in the documentary E Agora Maria? Her credits in film include roles in José Álvaro Morais Peixe Lua and Michael Dowse' It's All Gone Pete Tong. Her television credits include a guest appearance in the US sitcom Relic Hunter, My Family for the BBC and as Annette Forsyte in the remake of Forsyte Saga, Granada Television. She also has directed "Olá e Adeusinho" (Hello and Goodbye) by Athol Fugard at Teatro Cornucopia and "Azul Longe Nas Colinas" (Blue Remembered Hills) by Dennis Potter at Teatro Nacional D. Maria.

== Personal life ==
She was married to pianist Bernardo Sassetti until his death in 2012. The couple had two daughters. Since at least 2013, she maintains a public relationship with comedian Bruno Nogueira with whom she had another daughter. In 2012, the couple already worked on A Bizarre Salad, from Karl Valentin, where Nogueira performed as an actor and Batarda was stage director. She is also a first cousin of actress Leonor Silveira.

== Filmography ==
- Bad Living (2023)
- Living Bad (2023)
- Colo (2017)
- Night Train to Lisbon (2013)
- Cisne (2011) – Vera
- Duas Mulheres (2009) – Joana
- How to Draw a Perfect Circle (2009) – Leonor
- Cartaz Cultural (1 episode, 2008)
- Globos de Ouro 2007 (2008) (TV)
- Waking the Dead (2 episodes, Missing Persons: Part 1 and Missing Persons: Part 2, 2008) – Lore Carson
- Cartaz (1 episode, 2007)
- Nadine (2007) – Laura
- Antes de Amanhã (2007)
- Avé Maria (2006) (TV) – Maria
- S.A.C.: Des hommes dans l'ombre (2005) (TV) – Gina
- Alice (2005) – Luísa
- It's All Gone Pete Tong (2004) – Penelope
- A Costa dos Murmúrios (2004) – Evita
- Noite Escura (2004) – Carla Pinto
- Amnesia (2004) (TV) – Lucia Stone
- The Forsyte Saga: To Let (2003) TV mini-series – Annette Forsyte née Lamotte
- Quaresma (2003) – Ana
- The Forsyte Saga (2002) TV mini-series – Annette Forsyte née Lamotte
- Em Volta (2002) – Maria
- Mundo VIP (1 episode, Show nº 246, 2001)
- Doctors (1 episode, A Place of Safety, 2001) – Irena Savich
- My Family (1 episode, Parisian Beauty, 2001) – Sylvie
- Table 12 (1 episode, Magdalena, 2001) – Magdalena
- Relic Hunter (1 episode, Don't Go Into the Woods, 2001) – Vela
- Peixe-Lua (2000) – Maria João
- O Que Te Quero (1998)
- Elles (1997) – Catarina
- Porto Santo (1997) – Mariana
- Dois Dragões (1996) – Luísa
- A Caixa (1994) – Daughter
- Vale Abraão (1993) – Luisona (little girl) / Voice of Young Ema
- Tempos Difíceis (1988)

== Awards and nominations ==
In 2004 she won the Golden Globe at the Golden Globes, Portugal for Best Actress for Quaresma (2003). In 2005 she won two Golden Globes at the Golden Globes, Portugal for Best Actress for Noite Escura (2004) and for A Costa dos Murmúrios (2004). In 2008 she won the Golden Globe at the Golden Globes, Portugal for Best Actress for Construtor Solness, where she played Miss Hilda Wangel. In 2011 she won the SPA award Portugal for Best Actress for Duas Mulheres (2009).
