= António-Pedro Vasconcelos =

Portuguese film director (1939–2024)

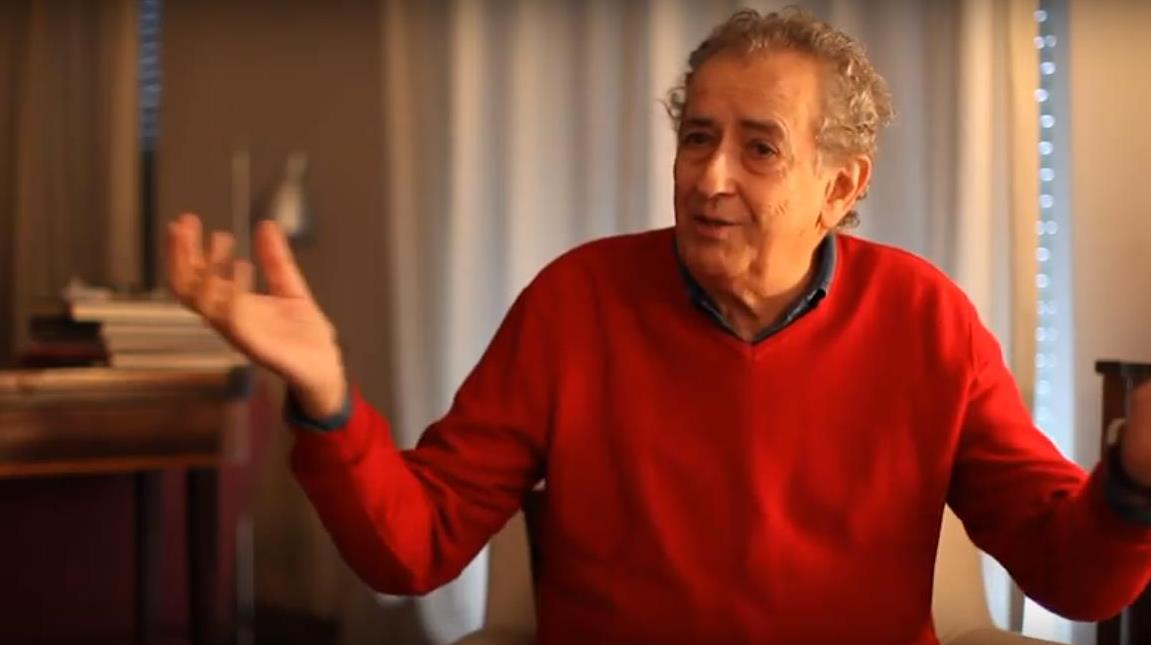
- Born: António-Pedro Saraiva de Barros e Vasconcelos; 10 March 1939; Leiria, Portugal
- Died: 5 March 2024 (aged 84)
- Citizenship: Portuguese
- Occupations: Film director, producer
- Years active: 1968–2024
- Movement: Novo Cinema Português

António-Pedro Saraiva de Barros e Vasconcelos GCIH (10 March 1939 – 5 March 2024) was a Portuguese film director.

== Personal life ==
Vasconcelos was the middle of three sons of Guilherme de Barros e Vasconcelos (Celorico de Basto, Britelo, 28 December 1902 – 1984), a lawyer and a nobleman of the Royal Household, and Palmira Henriqueta de Carvalho Saraiva (b. Portalegre, 28 August 1907).

In 1961, Vasconcelos married Maria Helena Marques (born 26 July 1939), whom he later divorced. His second wife, Maria Teresa de Carvalho de Albuquerque Schmidt, and had four children: Pedro Jaime Marque, Guilherme Infante de Lacerda, Patrícia Marques and Diogo Schmidt.

Vasconcelos was a known supporter of S.L. Benfica.

Vasconcelos died on 5 March 2024, at the age of 84.

== Filmography ==
- Exposição de Tapeçaria (1968)
- Indústria Cervejeira em Portugal - 2 (1968)
- Tapeçaria - Tradição Que Revive (1968)
- 27 Minutos Com Fernando Lopes Graça (1969)
- Fernando Lopes Graça (1971)
- Perdido por Cem... (1973)
- Adeus, Até ao Meu Regresso (1974)
- Emigr/Antes... E Depois? (1976)
- Oxalá (1980)
- O Lugar do Morto (1984)
- Aqui D'El Rei! (1992)
- Jaime (1999)
- Os Imortais (2003)
- Call Girl (2007)
- A Bela e o Paparazzo (2010)
- Parque Mayer (2018)
- KM 224 (2022)
