= Diogo Infante =

Portuguese film, television and theater actor, TV presenter

Diogo Nuno Infante de Lacerda (born 28 May 1967 in Lisbon) is a Portuguese theatre, cinema and television actor and television presenter.

== Early life and education ==
He is the natural son of Maria Infante de Lacerda by an Englishman named Jonathan and maternal grandson of Renée Lance Infante de Lacerda (born 19 February 1918), daughter of the 5th Barons of Sabroso. He studied at the Lisbon Theatre and Film School (Escola Superior de Teatro e Cinema).

== Personal life ==
He married Rui Calapez in October 2013 in a private ceremony in Torres Vedras and they have an adopted child Filipe.

On July 28 2018, Infante announced that he was gay.

== Selected filmography ==
- Brave New Land (2000)
- Portugal S.A. (2004)
- J.A.C.E. (2011)
- Depois do Adeus (2013 – TV)
- All Inclusive (2014)
- O Beijo do Escorpião (2014) (TVI)
- Jardins Proibidos (2014/15) (TVI)
- A Impostora (2016/17) (TVI)
