= Herman José =

German-Portuguese television personality (born 1954)

Herman José ComM
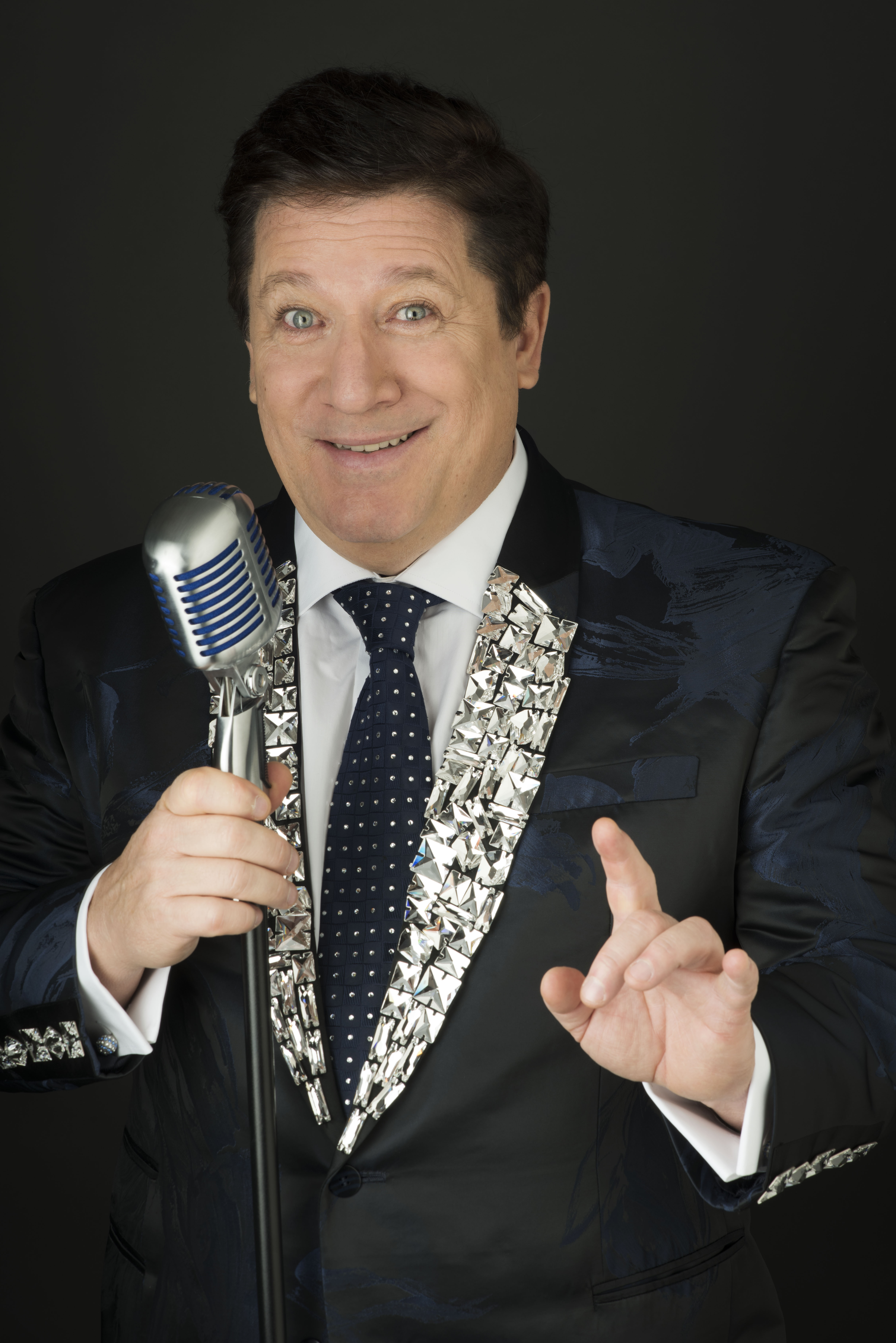
- Born: Hermann José von Krippahl; 19 March 1954 (age 72); Lisbon, Portugal
- Notable work: Sr. Feliz e Sr. Contente; O Tal Canal; Hermanias; Com a Verdade m'Enganas; Parabéns; Herman Enciclopédia; Herman 98; HermanSic; Hora H Chamar a Música; Nasci p'ra Cantar; Herman 2010

Comedy career
- Years active: 1975–present
- Medium: Talk show host, television, actor, musician, comedian
- Website: hermanjose.com

Hermann José von Krippahl ComM, known as Herman José (born 19 March 1954), is a Portuguese-born German comedian, television host, actor and musician. He is best known for his numerous TV shows and comedy sketches. Starting his career in the mid-1970s, Hermann José has become one of Portugal's most recognized comedians and TV personalities, featuring in some of his shows, among others, Amália Rodrigues, Kylie Minogue, Ramalho Eanes, Tony Bennett, Roger Moore, Cher and Joan Collins. He also opened for Frank Sinatra's first and only concert in Portugal.

== Early life ==
Herman was born in Lisbon to a Portuguese mother and a Spanish-German father on 19 March 1954. His father worked in a marble company and was an amateur filmmaker. Herman was featured in some of his father's films early in his life. Herman attended Lisbon's German School, and starred in all of his school's suites.

At age 18, he made his TV debut as the bassist of a musical trio on juvenile program.

In 1972, at the time of Salazar's Estado Novo regime, Herman was forced to either choose Portuguese citizenship and conscript to military service or to accept his German citizenship and leave the country. He decided on the latter and enrolled on Munich's School of Television and Film (Hochschule für Film und Bild), which he would never attend.

With the 1974 Carnation Revolution, Herman ended up staying in Portugal.

== Career ==
Herman started his acting career with the 1975 piece "Uma no Cravo, Outra na Ditadura" a film that also featured notable Portuguese actor and screenwriter Nicolau Breyner. In 1977 Herman releases his first single "Saca o Saca-Rolhas", which reached gold.

Herman José's professional career started in 1973–4 doing studio choruses (mostly on protest songs spun by the Carnation Revolution of April 1974) and acting in revues. His first leap to national fame was in 1975, invited by comedian Nicolau Breyner on to his TV show "Nicolau no País das Maravilhas", where he performed opposite the host in a weekly skit called "Sr. Feliz e Sr. Contente" ("Mr. Happy and Mr. Content"). His first big success as an author and performer was with O Tal Canal ("That Channel"), where he played several characters appearing on a fictitious TV channel. With this show, Herman José was attempting to shape the sense of humour of the Portuguese in the wake of the revolution that had ended almost fifty years of totalitarianism under the Estado Novo regime.

Hermanias continued his huge success, but the state channel RTP cancelled Humor de Perdição, his next show, after a sketch based on Saint Elizabeth of Portugal caused public outrage. He then turned mainly to daily game shows like Wheel of Fortune and Com a Verdade m'Enganas ("With the Truth You Fool Me"), and the talk/game show Parabéns ("Happy Birthday"). These shows had straight formats that he used for comedy. He returned to comedy in the 1990s, with Herman Enciclopédia and Herman 98, although for the first time the shows were mainly written by other people (from the company Produções Fictícias).

=== Later career ===
In 2000, Herman José moved from RTP to the private channel SIC, for a reported €1.5 million a year, to host a late-night show called HermanSic. Its sexual innuendo and X-rated acts resulted in low ratings. An attempt to go family-friendly in 2006 was also a failure. In 2007 he presented a new sketch show called Hora H ("The Eleventh Hour"), and in 2008 he began a new game show called Chamar a Música, which was a success. Then, in September, he began a new series of Wheel of Fortune, once again on SIC. From July to September 2009 he presented Nasci p'ra Cantar ("Born to Sing"), this time on TVI.

In 2009, he received the Top Choice Award for Top International Television Personality of Portugal.

After hosting late-night talk shows on the Portuguese television network RTP1, from 2010 to 2013, and the afternoon talk show Há Tarde (translating literally as "There is afternoon", but serving also as a pun on à tarde, or "in the afternoon"), alongside Vanessa Oliveira, Herman returned to comedy, premiering the sitcom Nelo e Idália on RTP1 in October 2015.

In 2018, he played the character David Attenburger (a pun on David Attenborough) in two filmed skits during the intervals of the semi-finals of the Eurovision Song Contest held in Lisbon. As Attenburger, he parodied Portugal and its habits in the style of Attenborough's TV series Planet Earth, titled Planet Portugal.

== Outside television ==
Herman José was a singer and had a popular one-man-show, in the late 1970s and early 1980s, which he performed both in Portugal and abroad, entertaining groups of Portuguese emigrants. His discs "Saca o Saca-Rolhas" ("Screw the Corkscrew", 1977) and "Canção do Beijinho" ("The Kiss Song", 1980) both reached gold record status.

He used to own Café Café and Bastidores, two popular bar/restaurants in Alcântara, Lisbon, where he performed stand-up comedy once a week. He is also a partner in the seafood restaurant Jardim do Marisco and the Tivoli Theatre, both also in Lisbon. His expensive tastes include high-end automobiles and motorbikes. He currently owns two Bentleys, a BMW Z4, a BMW Z8, a BMW 7 Series 760, and a Rolls-Royce and keeps an Azimut 55 yacht at the Vilamoura marina.

He is known for destroying scenery and props. On the last broadcast of Wheel of Fortune, in 1993, he fired a shotgun live at the scenery and at a TV set. He later justified the act as "just wanting to see what it looks like on the inside".

== Casa Pia scandal ==
On 29 December 2003, Herman José was accused of various child sexual abuse offences connected with the Casa Pia scandal. In May 2003, he was summoned to appear before the Criminal Court, accused of abusing an adolescent. However, he was able to prove that he was working for the SIC television channel in Brazil at the time. The judge, Ana Teixeira e Silva, dismissed the case.
