= 2012 Prémio Autores =

The 2012 Prémio Autores was the third edition of the Prémio Autores. It took place on 27 February 2012 and was broadcast by RTP.

== Winners and nominees ==
Winners are listed first and highlighted in boldface.

=== Film ===
- Best Screenplay
  - **João Canijo (Blood of My Blood)**
  - Luísa Costa Gomes and Edgar Pêra (O Barão)
  - Alberto Seixas Santos and Catarina Ruivo (E o Tempo Passa)
- Best Film
  - **Blood of My Blood, by João Canijo**
  - E o Tempo Passa, by Alberto Seixas Santos
  - 48, by Susana de Sousa Dias
- Best Actress
  - **Rita Blanco (Blood of My Blood)**
  - Beatriz Batarda (Cisne)
  - Anabela Moreira (Blood of My Blood)
- Best Actor
  - **Nuno Melo (O Barão)**
  - Nuno Lopes (Blood of My Blood)
  - Raul Solnado (América)

=== Radio ===
- Best Radio Program
  - **Caderneta de Cromos, by Nuno Markl (Rádio Comercial)**
  - A Cena do Ódio, by David Ferreira
  - No Fim da Rua, by Nuno Amaral

=== Dance ===
- Best Choreography
  - **Icosahedron, by Tânia Carvalho**
  - Um Gesto Que Não Passa de Uma Ameaça, by Sofia Dias and Vítor Roriz
  - The Old King, by Miguel Moreira and Romeu Runa

=== Music ===
- Best Song
  - **"E Fomos Pela Água do Rio", by Fausto Bordalo Dias**
  - "Fado Insulano", by Zeca Medeiros
  - "O Acesso Bloqueado", by Sérgio Godinho
- Best Album
  - **Em Busca das Montanhas Azuis, by Fausto Bordalo Dias**
  - Cantos da Babilónia, by Pedro Osório
  - Lisboa Mulata, by Dead Combo
- Best Erudite Music Work
  - **Interpretação da Integral de Chopin, by Artur Pizarro**
  - Os Apóstolos, by the Coro Gregoriano de Lisboa
  - Nise Lacrimosa, by Luís Carvalho

=== Literature ===
- Best Narrative Fiction Book
  - **Tiago Veiga. Uma Biografia, by Mário Cláudio**
  - A Cidade de Ulisses, by Teolinda Gersão
  - O Filho de Mil Homens, by Valter Hugo Mãe
- Best Poetry Book
  - **A Mão na Água Que Corre, by José Manuel de Vasconcelos**
  - Lendas da Índia, by Luís Filipe Castro Mendes
  - Adornos, by Ana Marques Gastão
- Best Children's and Juvenile Book
  - A Casa Sincornizada, written by Inês Pupo and Gonçalo Pratas, illustrated by Pedro Brito
  - Quando Eu For Grande, written by Maria Inês Almeida, illustrated by Sebastião Peixoto
  - Mariana e Manuel Numa Curva do Caminho, by Margarida da Fonseca Santos and Maria João Lopo de Carvalho

=== Theatre ===
- Best Performed Portuguese Text
  - **Israel, by Pedro Penim**
  - Horror, by Mickael de Oliveira
  - Estocolmo, by Daniel Jonas
- Best Show
  - **A Varanda, by Luís Miguel Cintra**
  - A Missão - Recordações de Uma Revolução, by Mónica Calle
  - Overdrama, by Jorge Andrade
- Best Actress
  - Ana Guiomar (Purga)
  - Sandra Faleiro (Who's Afraid of Virginia Woolf?)
- Best Actor
  - **Luís Miguel Cintra (Ela)**
  - Carlos Malvarez (Purga)
  - Elmano Sancho (Não Se Brinca Com o Amor)

=== Television ===
- Best Information Program
  - **Linha da Frente, by Mafalda Gameiro (RTP1)**
  - O Eixo do Mal, by Nuno Artur Silva (SIC Notícias)
  - Câmara Clara, by Paula Moura Pinheiro and Teotónio Bernardo (RTP2)
- Best Fiction Program
  - **O Último a Sair, by Bruno Nogueira, Frederico Pombares, João Quadros, Sérgio Graciano, André Banza and Ricardo Freitas** (RTP1)
  - Laços de Sangue, by Pedro Lopes and Patrícia Sequeira
  - Pai à Força, by Pedro Lopes and Duarte Teixeira
- Best Entertainment Program
  - **Cuidado com a Língua, by José Mário Costa and Ricardo Freitas**
  - Estado de Graça, by Maria João Cruz and Fernando Ávila
  - Estranha Forma de Vida, by Jaime Fernandes

=== Visual arts ===
- Best Plastic Arts Exhibition
  - **Fora de Escala, by Manuel Baptista**
  - Desenho Habitado, by Fernando Brízio
  - Colectiva Trinta Anos Prémios AICA/MC, by Manuel Graça Dias
- Best Photographic Work
  - **O PREC Já Não Mora Aqui, by João Pina**
  - TNSC - A Prospectus Archive, by Paulo Catrica
  - Um Diário da República, by Kameraphoto
- Best Scenographic Work
  - **A Varanda, by Cristina Reis**
  - Memorabilia, by José Capela
  - A Missão - Recordações de Uma Revolução, by Mónica Calle
