= Paixão season 1 =

Paixão
- Season 1
- "Força de Viver" (Portuguese) "Life Force" (English)
- Starring: Albano Jerónimo; Margarida Vila-Nova; Marco Delgado; Joana Solnado
- No. of episodes: 143

Release
- Original network: SIC
- Original release: September 18, 2017 – March 3, 2018

Season chronology
- Next → Season 2

The first season of Paixão (Living Passion) began airing on SIC on 18 September 2017 and ended on 3 March 2018.

== Plot ==
When he is arrested for a crime he did not commit, Miguel will fight to seek justice and recover the love of his life. Miguel and Luísa, in love since their teens, were planning to get married and fulfill all the dreams they had together. However, everything changes radically during a vacation in South Africa, when Luisa's father dies. Zé, Miguel's best friend, an ambitious man who is also in love with Luisa, hides from everyone that he was the murderer and accuses Miguel of the crime. Sentenced to a term of ten years for murder, Miguel is prevented from returning to Portugal and is never again to see the woman he loves. When he returns to the Algarve after completing his sentence, Miguel finds Luísa married to Zé and mother of Catarina. He discovers the child is his daughter and decides to stay in Portugal to fight for the girl, ready to recover the ten years they missed with each other and becomes a father to her. While attempting to rebuild himself and remove the stigma of having been the murderer of his ex-father-in-law, Miguel discovers that his autopsy was forged and that the cause of death was not the same for which he was convicted. Miguel determines to go on search to discover who the true assassin was, during which he feels like he reaches a dead end, again and again. Luisa and Miguel, now on opposite sides, fight against the love that, despite all that's happened, they still feel for each other. Another restraint to this Living Passion is also Zé, willing to do everything to stay with Luisa and Catarina, destroying Miguel.

A fight to regain an old passion and build a new one.

== Cast ==
Actor/Actress	Characters
Albano Jerónimo	Miguel Guerreiro
Margarida Vila-Nova	Maria Luísa Marreiros
Marco Delgado	Zé Mascarenhas
Joana Solnado	Helena Sequeira
Rita Blanco	Maria Paula Martins Guerreiro
Cláudia Vieira	Teresa Galvão
João Reis	Duarte Marreiros
António Pedro Cerdeira	Henrique Ribeiro
Bárbara Norton de Matos	Mónica Marques
Adriano Luz	Francisco Vaz
Custódia Gallego	Ofélia Vaz
João Baptista	Vasco Vaz
Tiago Teotónio Pereira	Luís «Lou» Vaz
Lia Carvalho	Laura Ramos
Inês Aires Pereira	Camila Silva
Manuel Cavaco	Augusto Ribeiro
Mafalda Jara	Jéssica Ferreira
Dinarte Branco	Gil Dias
Maria João Pinho	Alice Oliveira Dias
Rui Melo	Jacinto «Jay C» Gomes
Débora Monteiro	Conceicão «São» Oliveira Gomes
Rosa do Canto	Bárbara Oliveira
Oceana Basílio	Diana Bastos
Frederico Barata	Tiago Lopes
Joana Ribeiro	Ana Rita Sobral
Bárbara Lourenço	Isabel «Bé» Galvão
José Mata	Afonso Galvão
António Capelo	João Galvão
Maria João Abreu	Isabel Galvão
Miguel Nunes	Filipe Guerreiro
Inês Herédia	Júlia Marreiros
Pedro Sousa	Tomás Marreiros
Mónica Calle	Leonor Marreiros

=== Júnior Cast ===
Actor/Actress	Characters
Matilde Serrão	Catarina Marreiros
Lourenço Mimoso	Manel Bastos
Diogo Fragata	Vicente Pinto
Ricardo Viegas	Guilherme «Guilhas» Pereira
Inês Aguiar	Vera Veloso
Joana Lucas	Joana Nunes

=== Especial Guest ===
Actor/Actress	Characters
Rui Morrison	Paulo Marreiros
