= Fernando Luís =

Portuguese actor

- Born: Fernando Luís Rodrigues Correia; 9 March 1961 (age 65); Setúbal, Portugal
- Occupation: Actor

Fernando Luís Rodrigues Correia (born 9 March 1961 in Setúbal) is a Portuguese actor. Notable appearances include Médico de Família, A minha família é uma animação, A Minha Sogra é Uma Bruxa, Inspector Max and Noite Escura.

== Life and career ==
He was active at the Teatro Animação de Setúbal. In 1992, he received the award for Best Actor by the Portuguese Association of Theatre Critics (Associação Portuguesa de Críticos de Teatro) in the play The Threepenny Opera by Bertolt Brecht. Luís then starred on stage at the Teatro Maria Matos, Teatro da Cornucópia, Teatro Aberto, amongst others, in plays of Brecht, Eugene O'Neill, Ray Bradbury, Turgenev, Manuel Teixeira Gomes or Hélia Correia. He was directed by names such as João Canijo, Diogo Infante, Fernando Gomes, João Brites, Filipe La Féria, José Caldas, Jorge Lavelli, Carlos Avilez and Graça Correia.

He made his film debut in Rosa Negra, de Margarida Gil (1992). Since then, he has participated in films by directors such as Marco Martins, Manuel Mozos, Margarida Cardoso and José de Sá Caetano. He was directed by João Canijoin Sapatos Pretos (1998), Noite Escura (2004) and Mal Nascida (2007).

Luís is active in regular television series, and joined the cast of O Mandarim (1990), Alentejo Sem Lei (1990), Polícias (1996), Médico de Família (1998–2000), A minha família é uma animação (2001–2002), A Minha Sogra é Uma Bruxa (2002–2003), Inspector Max (2003–2005/2016-2017), Nome de Código: Sintra (2005–2006), Bocage (2006), A Minha Família (2006–2007), Doida Por Ti (2012–2013), Sol de Inverno (2014), Jardins Proibidos (2014–2015), and A Impostora (2016-2017).

He's childhood friends with fellow Setúbal-born actress Manuela Couto, with whom he works often.

== Dubbing ==
- Action Man - Action Man
- Animaniacs - Yakko Warner
- Trollhunters: Tales of Arcadia - Walter Strickler
- Wizards: Tales of Arcadia - King Arthur/Green Knight
- Flushed Away - Sid
- Beauty and the Beast - Lumiére
- The Boss Baby - Boss Baby
- Cars - Van, Sulley Car
- Happy Feet - Noah the Elder
- The Cat in the Hat - The Cat in the Hat
- The Lion King - Zazu and Rafiki
- The Emperor's New Groove - Pacha
- Hercules - Hades
- Disney's Hercules: The Animated Series - Hades
- A Bug's Life - P.T. Flea
- Monsters, Inc. - James P. "Sulley" Sullivan
- Monsters at Work - James P. "Sulley" Sullivan
- Finding Nemo - Bruce
- Pocahontas - Chief Powhatan
- The Polar Express - Smokey and Steamer
- Ultimate Spider-Man - Baron Mordo
- Star Wars Rebels - Darth Maul (First voice)
- The Wild - Samson
- Timon & Pumbaa - Zazu and Rafiki
