= 2006 Golden Globes (Portugal) =

Annual Portuguese awards ceremony

The 2006 Golden Globes (Portugal) were held on 25 May 2006.

== Winners ==
- Cinema:
  - Best Film: Alice, with Marco Martins
  - nominated: A Cara que Mereces, with Miguel Gomes
  - nominated: Adriana, with Margarida Gil
  - nominated: Odete, with João Pedro Rodrigues
  - Best Actor: Nuno Lopes, in Alice
  - nominated: Bruno Bravo, in Adriana
  - nominated: Joaquim de Almeida, in Um Tiro no Escuro
  - nominated: Luís Miguel Cintra, in O Quinto Império
  - Best Actress: Ana Moreira, in Adriana
  - nominated: Ana Cristina Oliveira, in Odete
  - nominated: Beatriz Batarda, in Alice
  - nominated: Isabel Ruth, in Adriana
- Merit and Excellency Award: Raul Solnado
