= Natural Law (TV series) =

Portuguese tv series

- Created by: Edgar Medina; Rui Cardoso Martins
- Screenplay by: Edgar Medina; Rui Cardoso Martins; Guilherme Mendonça; Elsa Sequeira Santos
- Directed by: João Nuno Pinto
- Starring: Margarida Vila-Nova; Nuno Lopes; Ivo Canelas; Maria Rueff; António Fonseca; Catarina Wallenstein; Afonso Laginha; Sílvia Chiola; Adriano Carvalho; Ana Vilela da Costa; Ana Valentim; Gonçalo Waddington; Miguel Borges; Pedro Lacerda; Leandro Paulin; João Figueiredo; Ivo Arroja
- Country of origin: Portugal
- No. of episodes: 7

Production
- Producer: Edgar Medina
- Cinematography: Kamil Plocki
- Editor: Micael Espinha

Original release
- Network: RTP1
- Release: 5 January – 16 February 2022

Natural Law is a 7 episode series, created by Edgar Medina and Rui Cardoso Martins, directed by João Nuno Pinto and produced by Arquipélago Films, with Margarida Vila-Nova and Nuno Lopes in the main roles. The soundtrack is composed by Justin Melland. The series premiered January 5, 2022, on RTP1.

== Synopsis ==
After the murder of a local student, a small town judge faces an unexpected dilemma: now her actions can put her family at risk.

== Reception ==
The crime drama “Natural Law” premiered its first episode at the event ONSeries Lisbon, the first international television networking event to be held in Portugal, on November 24, 2021, at the Centro Cultural de Belém (CCB), in Lisbon.

The show premiered on national television started on January 5 until February 16, on RTP1. The series has been received with critical acclaim, and praised for its technical and narrative quality, as well as recognized for its international potential.

“Everything (...) is shrouded in doubt, between the twists and turns of this thriller, first a crime drama, then judicial, then a family drama, and in part coming-age as well. Brilliantly contained. Enough is enough. Nothing more is necessary.” in Newspaper Novo Semanário.

“What was originally a show set primarily in courtrooms, with a criminal case per episode, became something much more intricate. To write the seven episodes of Natural Law, the authors extracted freely many details from true courtroom stories, “which is why the dialogue sounds so real” in Visão (Magazine)

“The cinematography is top-notch. The mise-en-scène, aerial shots and abandoned buildings – shooting occurred in the Caldas da Rainha area – join together in a suspenseful, nerve- wracking spectacle, with a cadence defined by American composer Justin Melland’s soundtrack (...).”, in Observador (Newspaper)

“ (. . . ) This series is a collection of impressions taken from a particular place, and of a cast of characters. All are involved in an ambiance that is as written as it is filmed, set to music and photographed. Natural Law benefits from the juxtaposition of the physical space with the psychological state of the characters.” in Público (Newspaper)

“There is a series that lights the way for the future of national television production: “Natural Law (...) “But the most important thing is that “Natural Law” is one of the most solid steps towards the realization of a national creative model, which differentiates us from the fiction of other creative poles. It is in their own identity, without being locked in a room, that the doors are opened to genuinely national production. Which can be international.” in Jornal de Negócios (Newspaper).

According to Afonso Laginha, who created an account on Reddit to make an AMA (Ask Me Anything), that was verified by the moderation team, there are plans to end the series in two more seasons, but nothing was defined yet.

== Cast ==
- Margarida Vila-Nova as Ana Martins
- Nuno Lopes as Detective Mário
- Ivo Canelas as Prosecutor Vítor
- Maria Rueff as Alice
- António Fonseca as Judge Luciano
- Catarina Wallenstein as Detective Maria
- Afonso Laginha as David
- Sílvia Chiola as Clara
- Adriano Carvalho as Prosecutor Abel
- Ana Vilela da Costa as Journalist Marta
- Ana Valentim as Attorney Joana
- Gonçalo Waddington as Attorney Renato
- Miguel Borges as Park Guard
- Pedro Lacerda as Ruço
- Leandro Paulin as Tozé
- João Figueiredo as Johny
- Ivo Arroja as Hugo

== Additional Cast ==
- Margarida Caldeira as Inês
- Diogo Nobre as André S. Gomes
- Margarida Moreira as Laura (André’s mother)
- Manuel Wiborg as Guilherme (André’s father)
- João Lagarto as Attorney Melo
- João Pedro Mamede as Attorney Sousa
- Joana Bárcia as Prostitute Simone
- Mitó as Prostitute Celeste
- João Pamplona as Cameraman
- Lourenço Henriques as Professor Lemos
- Nuno Nunes as Professor Chaves
- Maria do Ó as Martinha
- Rui Luís Brás as Priest
- Susana Blazer as Maria da Conceição
- Maria João Vaz as Clerk Júlia
- Miguel Monteiro as Clerk João
- António Mortágua as Rookie’s Owner
- Jorge Magalhães as Producer Arsénio
- Nuno Sá as Restaurant Owner
- Ana Bento as Kiki
- João Garcia Miguel as Mourita Owner
- Nuno Preto as Kidnapper
- António Simão as Policeman Witness 1
- Madalena Aragão as Mariana
- Maria Abreu as Mizé
- Sara Barros Leitão as Mónica
- Ivo Alexandre as Carlos Manuel
- Gustavo Sumpta as Coroner
- Marta Medeiros as Clara Teacher
- Diana Herzog as Helena
- Rui Cardoso Martins as Judge Mateus
- Helder Ramos as Taxi Driver Lacerda
- João Tempera as Nurse Pedro
- Nicolas Brites as Baby’s Uncle
- Dinarte Branco as Plaintiff Figueiredo
- Vanda Cerejo as Baby’s Mother
- Luís Barros as Policeman Witness 2
