= Paixão (TV series) =

- 1st season:"Força de Viver" ("Will to Live", in English); 2nd season: "A Hora da Vingança" ("Time For Revenge", in English)
- Created by: Filipa Poppe; Joana Andrade
- Starring: Albano Jerónimo; Margarida Vila-Nova; Joana Solnado; Marco Delgado (see more)
- Country of origin: Portugal
- Original language: Portuguese
- No. of seasons: 2
- No. of episodes: 320

Original release
- Network: SIC
- Release: 18 September 2017 – September 24, 2018

Related
- Amor Maior; Alma e Coração

Paixão (Living Passion) is a Portuguese telenovela which began airing on SIC in September 18, 2017 and ending in September 24, 2018.

In April 2018, Paixão won the Bronze World Medal in the 7th edition of The World's Best TV & Films awards.

== Plot ==
Series	Episodes	Originally released	
Series	Episodes	First released	Last released
1	143	18 September 2017	3 March 2018
2	177	5 March 2018	24 September 2018

=== Season 1 ===
When he is arrested for a crime he did not commit, Miguel will fight to seek justice and recover the love of his life. Miguel and Luísa, in love since their teens, were planning to get married and fulfill all the dreams they had together. However, everything changes radically during a vacation in South Africa, when Luisa's father dies. Zé, Miguel's best friend, an ambitious man who is also in love with Luisa, hides from everyone that he was the murderer and accuses Miguel of the crime. Sentenced to a term of ten years for murder, Miguel is prevented from returning to Portugal and is never again to see the woman he loves. When he returns to the Algarve after completing his sentence, Miguel finds Luísa married to Zé and mother of Catarina. He discovers the child is his daughter and decides to stay in Portugal to fight for the girl, ready to recover the ten years they missed with each other and becomes a father to her. While attempting to rebuild himself and remove the stigma of having been the murderer of his ex-father-in-law, Miguel discovers that his autopsy was forged and that the cause of death was not the same for which he was convicted. Miguel determines to go on search to discover who the true assassin was, during which he feels like he reaches a dead end, again and again. Luisa and Miguel, now on opposite sides, fight against the love that, despite all that's happened, they still feel for each other. Another restraint to this Living Passion is also Zé, willing to do everything to stay with Luisa and Catarina, destroying Miguel.

A fight to regain an old passion and build a new one.

=== Season 2 ===
Seven months later, Catarina tells her father that she will have a brilliant Visual Education note and her father is happy. Upon leaving the court, Zé is released because no evidence was found sufficient to incriminate him. Dr. Antunes, Julia, and Tomás leave behind him, furious. In the hospital room, Luisa sees the news of Zé's release on television. You're all set to go home. Catarina and Miguel enter at that moment and Catherine embraces her mother. Miguel tries to comfort her but Luiza does not conform to Zé's impunity. The doctor who followed her comes to say goodbye and praises her recovery. Luisa, Miguel and Catarina walk along the beach and the child realizes that the mother is sad. In the distance somebody photographs them but we do not realize who they are. In South Africa, Helena is in the graveyard for some flowers in her grandmother's grave when she receives a call from Nazareth. At the orange factory, Laura sings congratulations to Camila and Filipe for six months of dating. The two laugh at Laura's silly and even joke. In the estate, Bé and Teresa talk and none of them are very close to the parents, since Afonso and Ana Rita left. Teresa also does not forgive her father for having concealed Ze in court. Joao tries to make Isabel react but she feels that the children have all abandoned her. Isabel comments that Zé was acquitted and reproaches her husband for not telling the truth. Joao grabs her hand and tries to get her to dinner, but Isabel has no disposition. Teresa surprises her mother with the presence of Bé that embraces her mother. In the host house, Joana sees a video on the net, discouraged. Guilhas is now a famous youtuber and she misses him a lot, even when he dedicates videos to her. Tiago brings Vera back after a weekend with him and Bé. Barbara had already missed her. It shows him a photograph that he received from Vicente who went to the Aquarium Vasco da Gama in Lisbon with his grandfather. When seeing Joana sad, Vera tries to comfort her. Luisa returns home and finds her family happy, waiting for her. Despite all the care Luisa is absent, her head elsewhere. Luisa does not forgive the fact that John did not tell the truth in court. Tomás trains in the gym and feels very angry of Ze by this one has been acquitted. Luisa will greet her brother who is happy to have her back in the house. In Cape Town, Nazareth tells Helena that she was not the daughter of Carlos and Amelia. She does not know the details, except that she is the daughter of a family with money. Helena does not know what to think. At the reception home, Teresa welcomes Antonio, a troubled young man. This one is impressed by her boxing fight. Tomas goes to meet Zé at the resort and Zé proposes that they continue to work together. Tomas almost hits him but Zé immobilizes him. They still get caught up and Alice watches everything in the distance. After Tomas leaves, Alice approaches and offers help and Zé notices that this one has dressed the uniform of the resort of Miguel.

== Cast ==
Actor/Actress	Characters
Albano Jerónimo	Miguel Guerreiro
Margarida Vila-Nova	Luísa Marreiros
Joana Solnado	Helena Sequeira
Marco Delgado	Zé Mascarenhas
Rita Blanco	Maria Paula Martins Guerreiro
Cláudia Vieira	Teresa Galvão
João Reis	Duarte Marreiros
António Pedro Cerdeira	Henrique Ribeiro
Bárbara Norton de Matos	Mónica Marques
Adriano Luz	Francisco Vaz
Custódia Gallego	Ofélia Vaz
João Baptista	Vasco Vaz
Tiago Teotónio Pereira	Luís «Lou» Vaz
Lia Carvalho	Laura Ramos
Inês Aires Pereira	Camila Silva
Manuel Cavaco	Augusto Ribeiro
Mafalda Jara	Jéssica Ferreira
Dinarte Branco	Gil Dias
Maria João Pinho	Alice Oliveira Dias
Rui Melo	Jacinto «Jay C» Gomes
Débora Monteiro	Conceicão «São» Oliveira Gomes
Rosa do Canto	Bárbara Oliveira
Oceana Basílio	Diana Bastos
Frederico Barata	Tiago Lopes
Joana Ribeiro	Ana Rita Sobral
Bárbara Lourenço	Isabel «Bé» Galvão
José Mata	Afonso Galvão
António Capelo	João Galvão
Maria João Abreu	Isabel Galvão
Miguel Nunes	Filipe Guerreiro
Inês Herédia	Júlia Marreiros
Pedro Sousa	Tomás Marreiros
Mónica Calle	Leonor Marreiros

=== Supporting cast ===
Actor/Actress	Characters
Matilde Serrão	Catarina Marreiros
Lourenço Mimoso	Manel Bastos
Diogo Fragata	Vicente Pinto
Ricardo Viegas	Guilherme «Guilhas» Pereira
Inês Aguiar	Vera Veloso
Joana Lucas	Joana Nunes

=== Special Guest Stars ===
Actor/Actress	Characters
Rui Morrison	Paulo Marreiros
