= List of Portuguese films of 2016 =

The following is a list of Portuguese films that were first released in 2016.

== Highest-grossing films ==
The following is a list of the 10 highest-grossing domestic films in Portugal that were first released in 2016, as of December 28, 2016, according to the Instituto do Cinema e do Audiovisual (Institute of Cinema and Audiovisual).

| Rank | Title | Gross |
|---|---|---|
| 1 | A Canção de Lisboa | €944,564.76 |
| 2 | O Amor É Lindo... Porque Sim! | €149,533.33 |
| 3 | Letters from War | €110,071.54 |
| 4 | Refrigerantes e Canções de Amor | €56,914.00 |
| 5 | A Mãe É que Sabe | €47,379.62 |
| 6 | Jogo de Damas | €31,537.22 |
| 7 | Axilas | €18,276.61 |
| 8 | The Ornithologist | €18,386.57 |
| 9 | Os Belos Dias de Aranjuez | €12,908.00 |
| 10 | Cinzento e Negro | €7,493.80 |

== List of films ==
| Release date | Title | Director | Cast | Genre | Notes | Ref |
|---|---|---|---|---|---|---|
| January 28 | Jogo de Damas | Patrícia Sequeira | Ana Nave, Ana Padrão, Fátima Belo, Maria João Luís and Rita Blanco | Drama | | |
| January 28 | Quatro | João Botelho | | Documentary | | |
| February 11 | Lisbon Revisited | Edgar Pêra | | Documentary | | |
| March 3 | Gelo | Luís Galvão Teles, Gonçalo Galvão Teles | | Drama, fantasy | | |
| March 10 | O Amor É Lindo... Porque Sim! | Vicente Alves do Ó | | Comedy | | |
| March 17 | Posto Avançado do Progresso | Hugo Vieira da Silva | | Drama | | |
| March 31 | John From | João Nicolau | | Drama | | |
| April 21 | Gesto | António Borges Correia | | Documentary | | |
| May 5 | Axilas | José Fonseca e Costa | | Drama | | |
| May 5 | Mudar de Vida: José Mário Branco, Vida e Obra | Nelson Guerreiro, Pedro Fidalgo | | Documentary | | |
| May 5 | Rio Corgo | Sérgio da Costa, Maya Kosa | | Documentary | | |
| May 19 | Aqui em Lisboa: Episódios da Vida da Cidade | Gabriel Abrantes, Denis Côté | | Drama | | |
| May 19 | Cinzento e Negro | Luís Filipe Rocha | | Drama, thriller | | |
| June 16 | Grandes Esperanças | Miguel Marques | | Documentary | | |
| June 30 | Olmo e a Gaivota | Petra Costa, Lea Glob | | Documentary | | |
| July 14 | A Canção de Lisboa | Pedro Varela | | Comedy | | |
| August 25 | Refrigerantes e Canções de Amor | Luís Galvão Teles | | Comedy | | |
| September 1 | Letters from War | Ivo M. Ferreira | | Drama | | |
| October 13 | O Cinema, Manoel de Oliveira e Eu | João Botelho | | Documentary | | |
| October 20 | The Ornithologist | João Pedro Rodrigues | | Drama | | |
| October 20 | Rasgar o Passado | João Costa, Luís Diogo, Cláudio Jordão, José Miguel Moreira | | Drama | | |
| November 3 | A Toca do Lobo | Catarina Mourão | | Documentary | | |
| November 10 | SACA: O Filme de Tiago Pires | Júlio Adler | | Documentary | | |
| December 1 | Estive em Lisboa e Lembrei de Você | José Barahona | | Drama | | |
| December 8 | A Mãe É que Sabe | Nuno Rocha | | Comedy | | |
| December 15 | The Beautiful Days of Aranjuez | Wim Wenders | | Drama | | |
| December 29 | Never Ever | Benoît Jacquot | | Drama | | |

== See also ==
- 2016 in Portugal
