= The Fatalist =

2005 film directed by João Botelho

- Directed by: João Botelho
- Written by: João Botelho
- Story by: Denis Diderot
- Produced by: Paulo Branco
- Starring: Rogério Samora; Rita Blanco
- Cinematography: Edmundo Diaz
- Music by: Johannes Brahms
- Release date: 2005
- Countries: Portugal; France
- Language: Portuguese

The Fatalist (Portuguese: O Fatalista, French: Le fataliste) is a 2005 Portuguese-French drama film written and directed by João Botelho. It is based on Denis Diderot's novel Jacques the Fatalist. It was entered into the main competition at the 62nd edition of the Venice Film Festival.

== Cast ==
- Rogério Samora as Tiago
- Rita Blanco as Senhora D.
- Suzana Borges as Estalajadeira
- Patrícia Guerreiro as Bárbara
- José Wallenstein as Marquis
- Teresa Madruga as Bárbara's mother
- Margarida Vila-Nova as the daughter
- Maria Emilia Correia as the landlady
- Adriano Luz as the husband
- João Baptista as Tiago (aged 20)
- Helena Laureano as Miss Suzete
- Ana Bustorff as Miss Margarida
- Laura Soveral as Tiago's grandmother
