= Al Berto =

Portuguese writer pseudonym

Alberto Raposo Pidwell Tavares
- Born: January 11, 1948; Coimbra, Portugal
- Died: June 13, 1997 (aged 49); Lisbon, Portugal
- Occupations: Poet, novelist and editor
- Writing career
- Pen name: Al Berto
- Notable awards: Prémio Pen Club, Ordem Militar de Santiago da Espada

Al Berto was the pseudonym used by the Portuguese poet, painter, editor and cultural programmer Alberto Raposo Pidwell Tavares (January 11, 1948 – June 13, 1997).

== Life ==
Born in a family of the upper class bourgeoisie (English origin by the paternal grandmother). A year later he moved to the Alentejo. His father died early, in a car accident. In Sines he spends all his childhood and adolescence, until the family decides to send him to the art school Escola António Arroio, in Lisbon.

On April 14, 1967, a military refractory, he went to live in Belgium, where he studied painting at the École Nationale Supérieure d'Architecture et des Arts Visuels (La Cambre) in Brussels. After completing the course, he decides to quit painting in 1971 and dedicated himself exclusively to writing.

During this period he lived in a community of hippy artists and, following a connection with a Belgian girl, would have fathered a child.

Returns to Portugal on November 17, 1974 and writes the first book entirely in the Portuguese language, "À Procura do Vento num Jardim d'Agosto".

"O Medo", an anthology of his work from 1974 to 1986, is published for the first time in 1987. This became the most important work of his career and his definitive artistic testimony, being added in later editions new writings of the author, even after his death.

He also left incomplete texts for an opera, for a photo book about Portugal and a "false autobiography," as the author himself called it.

Al Berto died in Lisbon, on 13 June 1997, of lymphoma, at the age of 49.

In 2009 the Theater Company O Bando debuted Teatro Nacional D. Maria II, in Lisbon, a show entitled "A Noite" inspired in the works Lunário, Três cartas da memória das Índias, Apresentação da noite, O Medo, À procura do vento num jardim d'Agosto e Dispersos. The show was staged by João Brites and played by Ana Lúcia Palminha and Pedro Gil. In addition to Lisbon, the show was still at the Teatro da Cerca de São Bernardo in Coimbra and in the space of O Bando.

In 2017, the first biographical film, Al Berto, was released by Vicente Alves do Ó, which portrays a homosexual relationship between the poet and the filmmaker's brother in 1975.

== Works ==
=== Poetry ===
- Trabalhos do Olhar (1982)
- O Último Habitante (1983)
- Salsugem (1984)
- A Seguir o Deserto (1984)
- Três Cartas da Memória das Índias (1985)
- Uma Existência de Papel (1985)
- O Medo (Trabalho Poético 1974-1986) (1987)
- O Livro dos Regressos (1989)
- A Secreta Vida das Imagens (1990)
- Canto do Amigo Morto (1991)
- O Medo : Trabalho Poético 1974-1990 (1991)
- Luminoso Afogado (1995)
- Horto de Incêndio (1997)
- O Medo (1998)
- Degredo no Sul (2007)

=== Prose ===
- À Procura do Vento num Jardim d'Agosto (1977)
- Meu Fruto de Morder, Todas as Horas (1980)
- Lunário (1988)
- O Anjo Mudo (1993)
- Dispersos (2007)
- Diários (2012)
