= Odisea =

Odisea may refer to:

- Odisea (album), by Ozuna, or the title song, 2017
- "Odisea", a song by Karol G, featuring Ozuna, from KG0516, 2021
- Odisea (TV channel), or Odisseia, a documentary channel in Spain and Portugal

== See also ==
- Odissea, a 1986 album by Mango
- Odisseia (TV series), a 2013 Portuguese comedy series
