= Adriane Garcia =

Brazilian TV presenter, actress and musician

- Born: Adriane Garcia; September 19, 1981 (age 44); Rio de Janeiro, RJ, Brazil
- Occupations: TV show presenter, actress, singer-songwriter
- Years active: 2000–present
- Television: Sucesso; Só Visto

Adriane Garcia (September 19, 1983) is a Brazilian TV presenter, actress and former pop singer-songwriter. She has lived in Lisbon, Portugal since 2005.

== Career ==
Since she was a child, Adriane Garcia has always been passionate about music. At 14 she began a career as a model, but it was only years later that her life changed. After she had some interests in soap operas and mini-TV-series, Adriane was a reporter at SporTV in Brazil. In 2002 she joined SBT reality show Casa dos Artistas 3. Adriane was chosen to live in the house, where she stayed for 45 days. Her obvious interest in pursuing a career in music, Adriane was probed by Building Records to record some demo songs. As a result, the label approved her work and the same year Adriane began recording her first album.

Later Garcia took part in the third session of the Brazilian reality show Casa dos Artistas. She then released her debut album, Vem Ficar Comigo, in early 2004. In 2007 she was chosen as the presenter for the Record Internacional's TV show Sucesso, in Portugal.

As the first Brazilian at all she is working now as TV Presenter for Rádio e Televisão de Portugal. In April 2012 she posed for fashion magazine Maxim in Portugal.

== Filmography ==
Television
Year	Title	Role	Notes
2000	Malhação	Luana	Season 7
2000	Laços de Família	Juliana	Cameo appearance
2001	SporTV Brasil	Herself / Reporter	
2002	Programa Amaury Jr.	Herself / Reporter	
2003	Casa dos Artistas 3	Herself / Participant	
2006	Páginas da Vida	Celina	
2006–2009	Sucesso	Herself / Presenter	
2006	O Quinto Poder	Suely	Season 1, Episode 2
2009	Ele É Ela	Sandy	Season 1, Episode 8
2010	Pai à Força	Herself	Season 2, Episode 6
2010	Voo Directo	Yolanda	Season 1, Episode 2
2010	Laços de Sangue	Maria	Cameo appearance
2010–2011; 2013–present	Só Visto	Herself / Reporter; Herself / Presenter	
2011	Maternidade	Solange	Season 1
2011–present	Cinco Sentidos	Herself / Presenter	
2012	7 Maravilhas	Herself / Presenter	
2014	3 Por Uma	Herself / Presenter	
2014–present	Água de Mar	Gabi	

Films
Year	Title	Role	Notes
2011	Linhas de Sangue	Miriam	Short film
2012	Falling into You	Herself	Short film

Radio
Year	Title	Notes
2008–2009	Programa Adriane Garcia	Rádio Tropical FM
2013–present	A Hora da Dri	Record Europa FM

== Discography ==
=== Albums ===
List of albums
Title	Album details
Vem Ficar Comigo	Release: December 15, 2003; Label: Building Records; Formats: CD, digital download
Lança Perfume	Release: Setembro 20, 2006; Label: NZ Produções; Formats: CD, digital download

=== Singles ===
Song	Year	Album
"Amor Perfeito"	2002	Vem Ficar Comigo
"Vem Ficar Comigo"	2003	Vem Ficar Comigo
"Diversão"	2003	Vem Ficar Comigo
"Me Leva Pra Casa"	2004	Vem Ficar Comigo
"Lança Perfume"	2006	Lança Perfume
