= Maternidade =

- Genre: Medical drama
- Developed by: SP Televisão
- Starring: Lúcia Moniz; José Fidalgo; Patrícia Bull; Martinho da Silva; Joaquim Horta; Isabel Figueira; Alexandre de Sousa
- Country of origin: Portugal
- Original language: Portuguese
- No. of seasons: 2
- No. of episodes: 39

Original release
- Network: RTP1
- Release: January 30, 2011 – February 23, 2013

Maternidade is a Portuguese medical drama television series broadcast by RTP. It has two seasons, the first with 13 episodes and the second with 26 episodes. It originally aired from 30 January 2011 to 23 February 2013 on RTP1.

== Cast ==
- Lúcia Moniz
- José Fidalgo
- Patrícia Bull
- Martinho da Silva
- Joaquim Horta
- Isabel Figueira
- Alexandre de Sousa
- Custódia Gallego
- Alda Gomes
- José Mata
- Fernando Pires
- Cláudia Semedo
- Adriane Garcia
- Miguel Costa
- Miguel Damião
- Rita Blanco
