= Will-o'-the-Wisp (film) =

2022 film by João Pedro Rodrigues

- Portuguese theatrical release poster
- Portuguese: Fogo-Fátuo
- Directed by: João Pedro Rodrigues
- Written by: João Pedro Rodrigues; João Rui Guerra da Mata; Paulo Lopes Graça
- Produced by: João Matos; João Pedro Rodrigues; Vincent Wang
- Starring: Mauro Costa; André Cabral
- Cinematography: Rui Poças
- Edited by: Mariana Gaivão
- Production companies: Filmes Fantasma; House on Fire; Terratreme Filmes
- Distributed by: Terratreme Filmes; JHR Films; Strand Releasing
- Release date: 24 May 2022 (Cannes)
- Running time: 67 minutes
- Countries: Portugal; France
- Language: Portuguese

Will-o'-the-Wisp (Portuguese: Fogo-Fátuo) is a 2022 Portuguese musical romantic comedy film directed by João Pedro Rodrigues. The film stars Mauro Costa as Alfredo, the crown prince of Portugal whose passion for the environment leads him to become a fireman, where he falls in love with colleague Afonso (André Cabral).

The film contains a number of choreographed dance numbers set in the firehouse, and includes references such as Alfredo directly quoting parts of Greta Thunberg's 2019 speech to the United Nations when trying to defend his choice to his disapproving family.

The film's cast also includes Joel Branco, Oceano Cruz, Margarida Vila-Nova, Miguel Loureiro, Dinis Vila-Nova, Luisa Castelo Branco, Vasco Redondo, Teresa Madruga, Ana Bustorff, João Mota, Paulo Bragança, Anabela Moreira, Raquel Rocha Vieira, Cláudia Jardim, Joana Barrios and João Villas-Boas.

== Distribution ==
The film premiered in the Directors' Fortnight program at the 2022 Cannes Film Festival. It was subsequently screened at the Brussels International Film Festival, where it was the winner of the Grand Prix in the Directors' Week program. It had its North American premiere at the 2022 Toronto International Film Festival.
