= Tânia Carvalho =

Portuguese artist

- Born: 1976 (age 49–50); Viana do Castelo, Portugal
- Occupations: Artist, choreographer, dancer

Tânia Carvalho (born Viana do Castelo, 1976) is a Portuguese artist with a career spanning over 20 years. Best known as a choreographer, she also works in other artistic fields, such as music, drawing and film.

== Biography ==
Carvalho was born in Viana do Castelo and lives in Lisbon.

Carvalho's choreography work includes pieces for the Lyon Opera Ballet (Xylographie), the Company of Elders in London (I Walk, You Sing), the National Ballet of Portugal (S), the Paulo Ribeiro Company (How will I do this? interpreted by Leonor Keil), and Dançando com a Diferença (Doesdicon).

In 2018, Teatro Maria Matos, Teatro São Luiz and the National Ballet of Portugal performed the Tânia Carvalho Cycle to celebrate her twenty years of artistic creation.

She has been developing several musical projects, of which stand out, among others, Madmud, Idiolecto and dubloc barulin. She occasionally composes soundtracks for her creations, as well as for other choreographers, such as Luís Guerra.

In 2018, Carvalho directed A Bag and a Stone – dance piece for screen, her first film.

She was part of the international network of programmers and choreographers Modul Dance (2011-2014) and programmed the national section of the Cumplicidades Festival (Portugal, 2018). She participated in the Festival Best Of (Les Subsistances, Lyon, 2018), with The Recoil of Words.

In 2021, Tânia was one of four women invited to develop a choreography for the Ballet National de Marseille, within a program that includes pieces by choreographers Lucinda Childs, American, Lasseindra Ninja, Guyanese, and the Irish Oona Doherty.

In 2022, as part of the Portugal-France Cultural Season, the Théâtre de la Ville dedicates a focus on her work, presenting several shows in Paris.

Winner of the Young Creators Award 2000 (Programa Jovens Criadores), with Inicialmente Previsto, she participated, in that capacity, in a festival in Sarajevo. She was also awarded the 2012 Prémio Autores and the 2021 Prémio Autores from the Portuguese Society of Authors, for the creation of Icosahedron and onironauta.

== Selected works ==
=== Choreography ===
- Por Baixo de Mão (2021)
- Young Dancers Project (2021)
- one of four periods in time (2021)
- onironauta (2020)
- muiças (2019)
- S (2018)
- Doesdicon (2017)
- Grasped By Intuition (2017)
- GLIMPSE – 5 Room Puzzle (2016)
- Xylographie (2016)
- Weaving Chaos (2014)
- Síncopa (2013)
- Coral (2013)
- The Recoil of Words (2013)
- 27 Bones (2012)
- Icosahedron (2011)
- Der Mann ist verrückt (2009)
- Danza Ricercata (2008)
- But From Me I Can't Escape, Have Patience! (2008)
- Orquestica (2006)
- Exploding In Silence Never Becomes Disturbing (2005)

=== Music ===
- Papillons d'éternité (2021)
- duploc barulin (2019)
- Madmud (2007)

=== Visual art ===
- Exhibition by Tânia Carvalho and Luís Guerra, in partnership with Dançando com a Diferença, Galeria Marca d’Água, Funchal, 2019
- Toledo, by Tânia Carvalho (within BoCA - Bienal de Artes Contemporâneas), Teatro da Politécnica, Lisbon, Palacete Viscondes de Balsemão, Porto and Teatro Viriato, Viseu, 2017
- Dessins, by Tânia Carvalho, KLAP Maison Pour la Danse, Marseille

=== Film ===
- A Bag and a Stone - dance piece for screen (2018)

== Awards ==
- 2000 – Young Creators Award from Programa Jovens Criadores, with Inicialmente Previsto
- 2012 – Best Choreography Award from Sociedade Portuguesa de Autores, with Icosahedron
- 2019 – Citizen of Merit by the Viana do Castelo City Council
- 2021 – Best Choreography Award from Sociedade Portuguesa de Autores, with Onironauta∫
