= Teatro o Bando =

Portuguese travelling theatre

Teatro O Bando
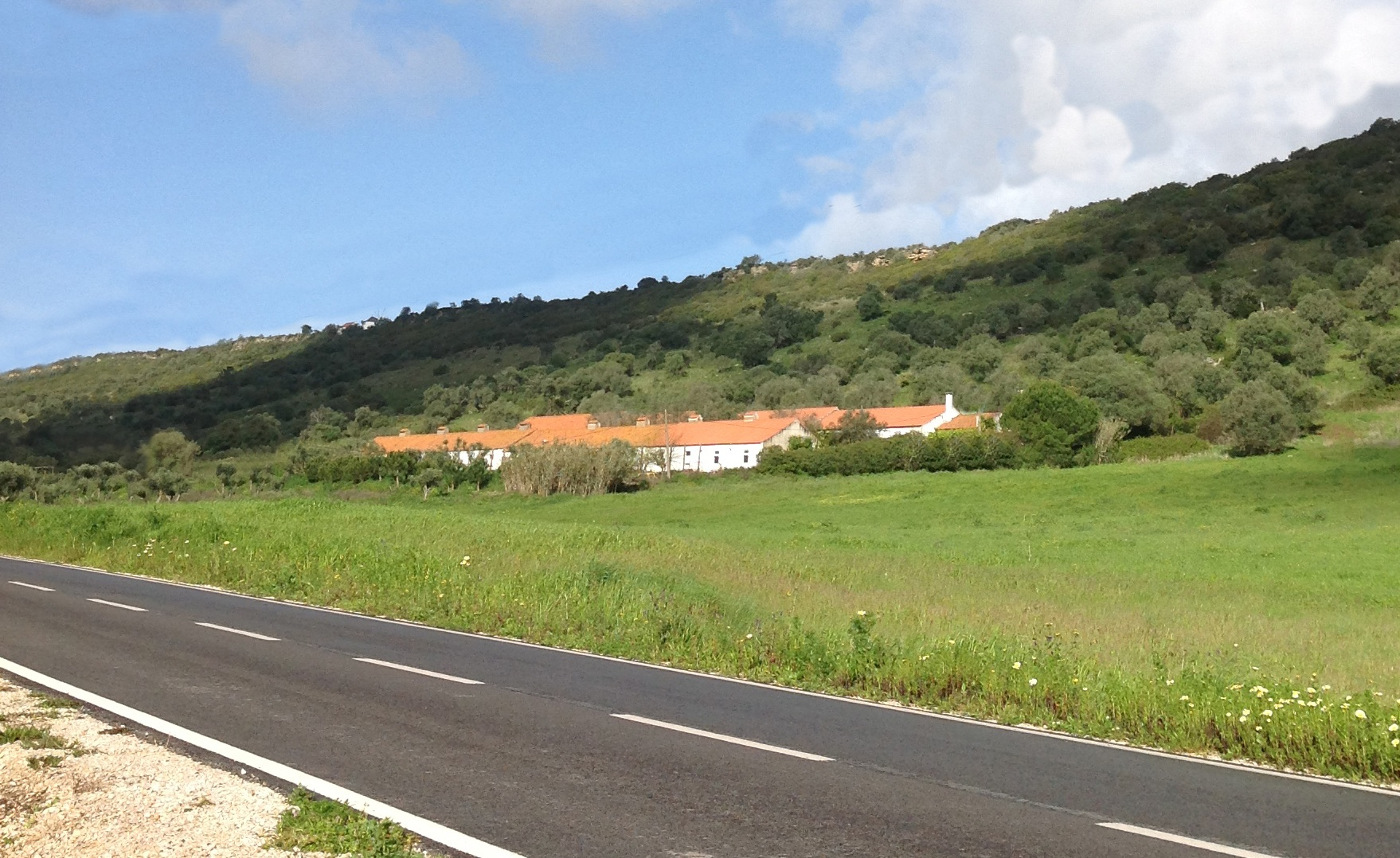
- Headquarters at Palmela
- Type: Theatre Company
- Industry: Theatre, actor's training, community activities
- Founded: April 10, 1979
- Founders: João Brites; Jaqueline Tison; Cândido Ferreira; Carmen Marques; Jorge Barbosa; Maria Janeiro
- Headquarters: Palmela, Portugal
- Area served: Worldwide
- Key people: Directors: João Brites, Raul Atalaia and Sara de Castro
- Products: Plays, events and classes
- Website: www.obando.pt

Teatro O Bando is a Portuguese professional traveling theatre company active since 1974. According to its official website, it is "[a] collective that elects aesthetic transfiguration has a civic and community participation".

== Founding ==
The Cooperativa de Produção Artística Teatro e Animação "O Bando" C.R.L. (Artistic Production Cooperative for Theatre and Animation o Bando), was founded on April 10, 1979, headquartered in the Anjos Palace, at Algés by the artists João Brites, Jaqueline Tison, Cândido Ferreira, Carmen Marques, Jorge Barbosa and Maria Janeiro. The name o Bando is the Portuguese expression for a flock of birds. When it was founded, the company was structured within the childhood theatre area, a free concept that fought the post-revolutionary tendency to infantilize children created by commercial children's theatre. According to Teatro O Bando's approach, the child should be an active part of society, able to have a political and artistic point of view and to manage the limits between concrete reality and dreams. This opposes the average commercial approach that underestimates the child's creative potential by using disarming fairy tales and other stereotyped worlds built by grownups.

== Singularism as an aesthetic trend ==
Teatro O Bando maintains its original collectivist methodology based on a long achieved experience named singularism. The singularism aesthetic methodology has the objective of achieving unexpected and singular works because they are not the result of a single illuminated individual. Those works can be recognized because the artistic leadership seeks the transpersonal dimension of its results and not by being merely based on variations of a same style that repeats itself. This way, Teatro O Bando refreshes its acquired knowledge when it searches for a constant unease and defy in its unclassifiable shows. The group's theatrical creations are fueled by cultural activities, mainly in training and audience sensitization, that interact with several types of participants and contributes to a growing impact in the community, in the artistic métier and in the professional actor's training.

== Dramaturgy ==
The company adapts Portuguese non-theatrical texts to theater, so that novels, poems and folk stories are staged and are the basis of Teatro O Bando's dramaturgic work. Teatro O Bando has the most shows created from masterworks of Portuguese authors. Its adaptations include:

- 'Gente Feliz com Lágrimas' based on the homonymous work of João de Melo
- 'Bichos' based on the homonymous work of Miguel Torga
- 'Gente Singular' based on the homonymous work of Manuel Teixeira Gomes
- 'Pino do Verão' from poems by Eugénio de Andrade
- 'Ensaio sobre a Cegueira' ("Blindness") based on the homonymous work of José Saramago

== Scenic spaces and scene machines ==
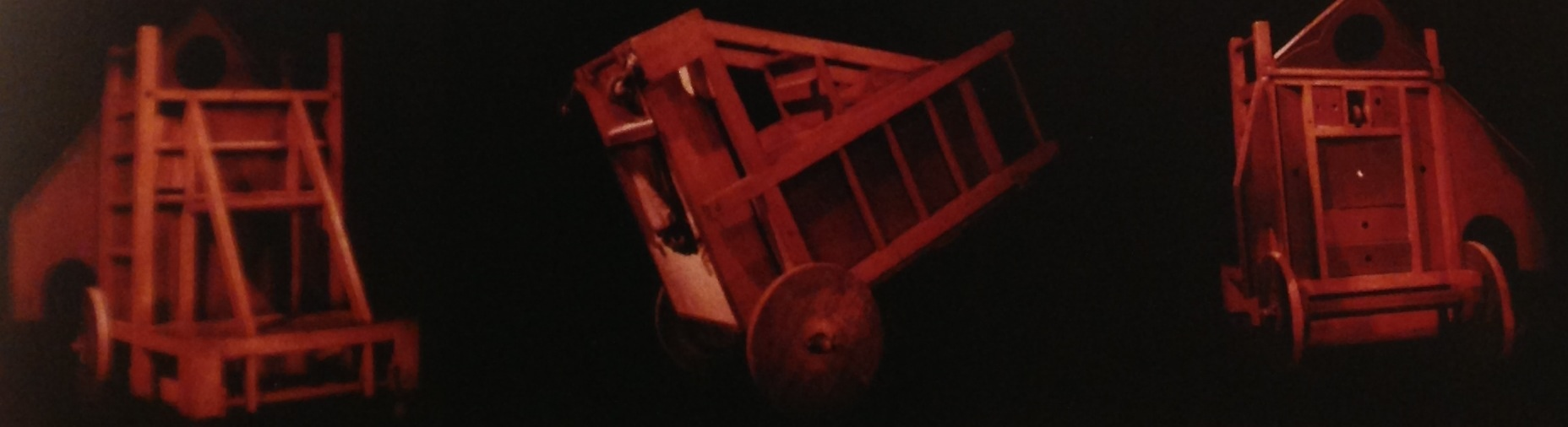
THRONE(Afonso Henriques) photo by Rui Cunha

Teatro O Bando has always sought unconventional spaces to put on productions. Even when the show happens in a conventional theatre, different solutions are studied. For example, the front of the stage can advance inside and over some of the audience's chairs in a big diagonal, creating a break from formal, frontal stage.

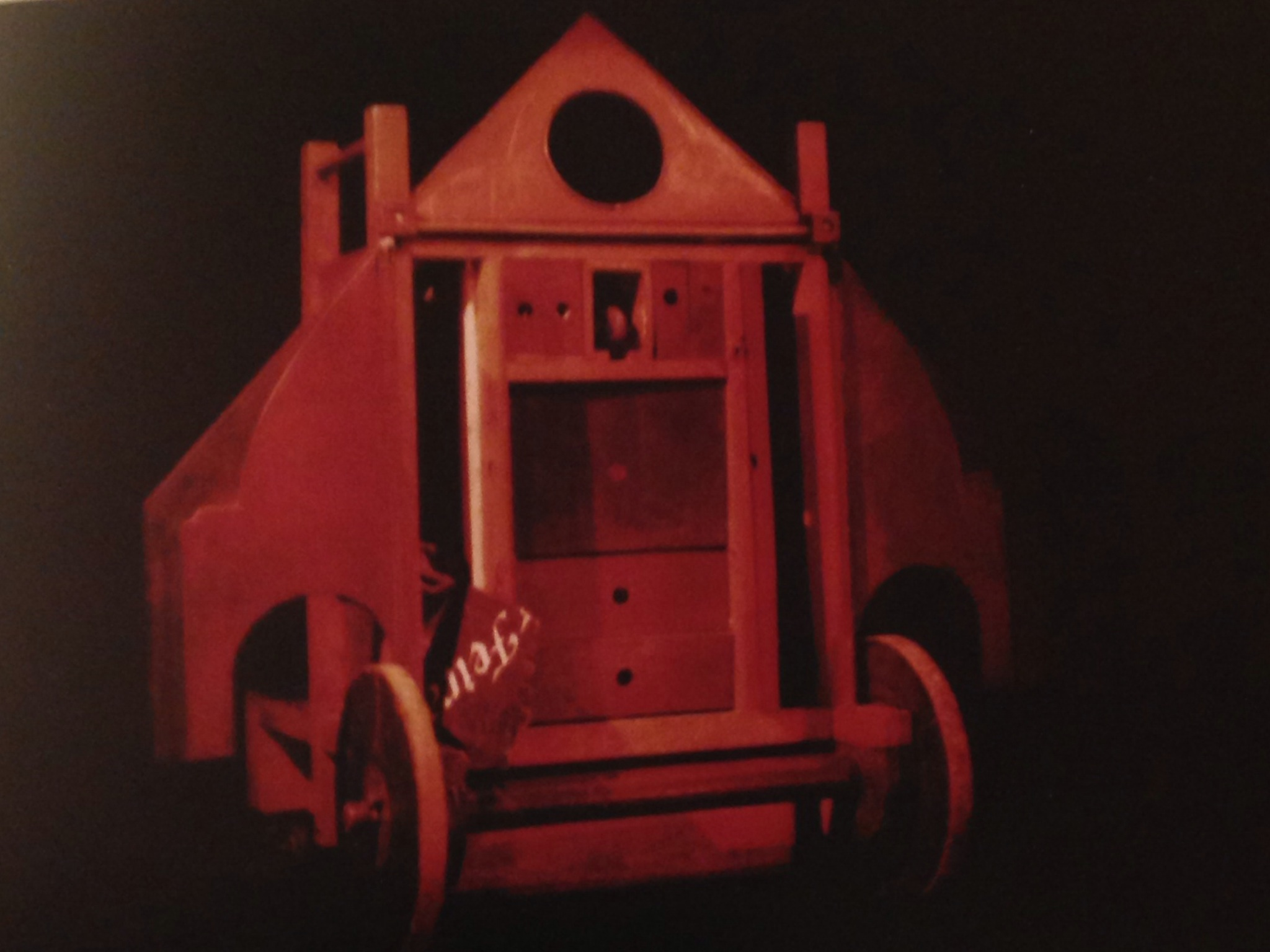
THRONE(Afonso Henriques) photo by Rui Cunha

The group also creates shows with devices called scene machines that are not static scenes merely at the service of actors; they are equivalent to characters because they create tensions and emotions even when they are stationary. Theater critic Jorge Listopadits said, "a theatre that draws a new landscape but a landscape with a wider scope then the one of nature". As a result of intense touring activity, the scene machines have become important in Teatro O Bando and in Portuguese Theatre history. Theatre professor and historian Maria Helena Serôdio calls them "polysemic objects" that achieve a function or meaning according to the position they occupy on stage.

One example of this is in Afonso Henriques' show, on stage since 1983 and still working today, is called the throne, but depending on its position can be a cradle, a cart, a castle, a cathedral or a bed. From this patrimony of several shows throughout the decades, Teatro O Bando has most of scene machines scattered throughout the landscape within its headquarters, in a perpetual exposition called Ao Relento. Various parts of Teatro O Bando's shows can be isolated and still be of artistic value. For example, the characters usually continue in small-scale shows after the large-scale shows are discontinued, the text can be read and have literary value on its own, the musical composition with its abstract meaning is reused by others in agreement with Teatro O Bando and the composer.

== Headquarters ==
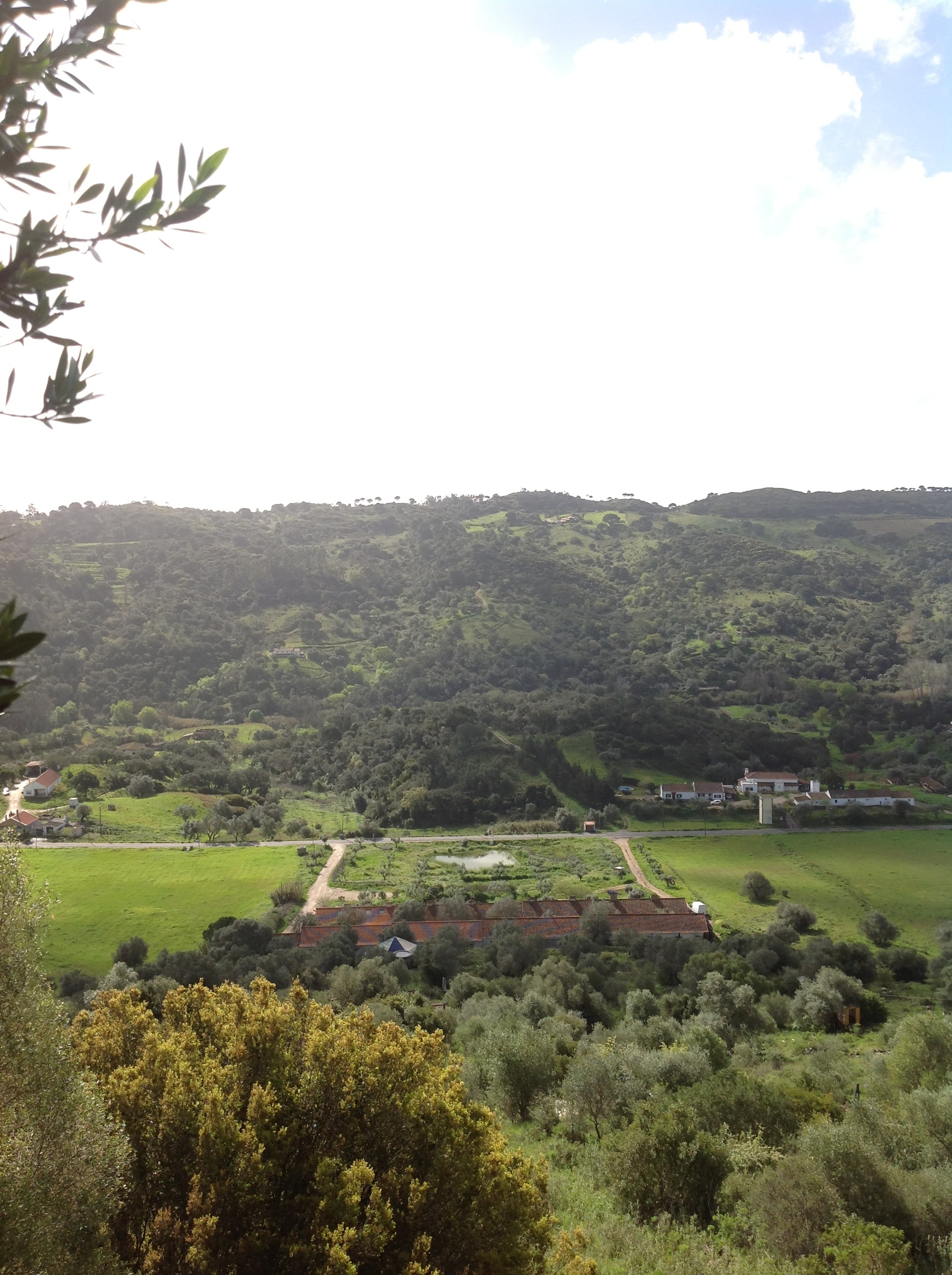
View of the headquarters from top of the hill

After having several homes in Lisbon since its foundation, in 2000 Teatro O Bando moved its headquarters to Vale dos Barris in Palmela, inside the Natural Reserve of the Arrábida in a farm of 80 hectares. Two pavilions, constructed from old pig styes, were remodeled to have offices, workshops, warehouses, dressing rooms, interior and exterior stages. This rural space is used for artistic residences and workshops, allied with Teatro O Bando's training knowledge, actors, musicians and singers discover new approaches to the stage.

== Cooperative's structure (2013) ==
Teatro O Bando is organized as cultural cooperative since its foundation and is one of the first and oldest Portuguese cultural cooperatives, although in fiscal terms it is the same as a private corporation.

=== General Assembly and the elected Board of Directors ===
The highest organ is the General Assembly of Cooperants, composed of 22 members who elect the current board of directors. These three manage Teatro O Bando's team in its daily work. Other nominations made by this assembly are the functions within the cooperative, such as the president of the assembly, the secretary and any new members, and a Board of Artistic Directors.

=== Board of Artistic Directors ===
The Board of Artistic Directors is the creative core that analyzes and discusses future projects. It conceives and executes the projects leading them from the concept/idea/draft to stage.

== International touring ==
Teatro O Bando tours it shows in Portugal and abroad. The company puts on more shows on the road throughout the world than it does at home. Its members traveled in Portugal's deserted rural interior in the 1970s, undertook European tours in the 1980s and later toured worldwide to theatre festivals. Teatro O Bando builds large, heavy, scenic spaces and to take them around. It has been to five continents, taking the shows but maintaining a long-term artistic and effective relationship with the hosts in Brazil, Germany, Russia, and various African nations.

== Other aspects ==
- In 1997 João Brites was invited to direct the Street Shows Full Department at the Expo 98, the international exposition in Lisbon 1998, all Teatro O Bando's team was involved coordinating this event.
- On June 25, 2010, the Portuguese Ministry Presidency declared the Cooperativa de Produção Artística Teatro Animação O Bando, C.R.L. a National Entity of Public Utility, published in Diário da República.
- Under the leadership of João Brites, Miguel Jesus and Rui Francisco, Teatro O Bando was the Portuguese representative in Prague Quadrennial 2011 with the theme "on the other side".
- Teatro o Bando is a member of the European Theatre Networks ConnectUp and PlayOn!
