= Anabela Moreira =

Portuguese actress (born 1976)

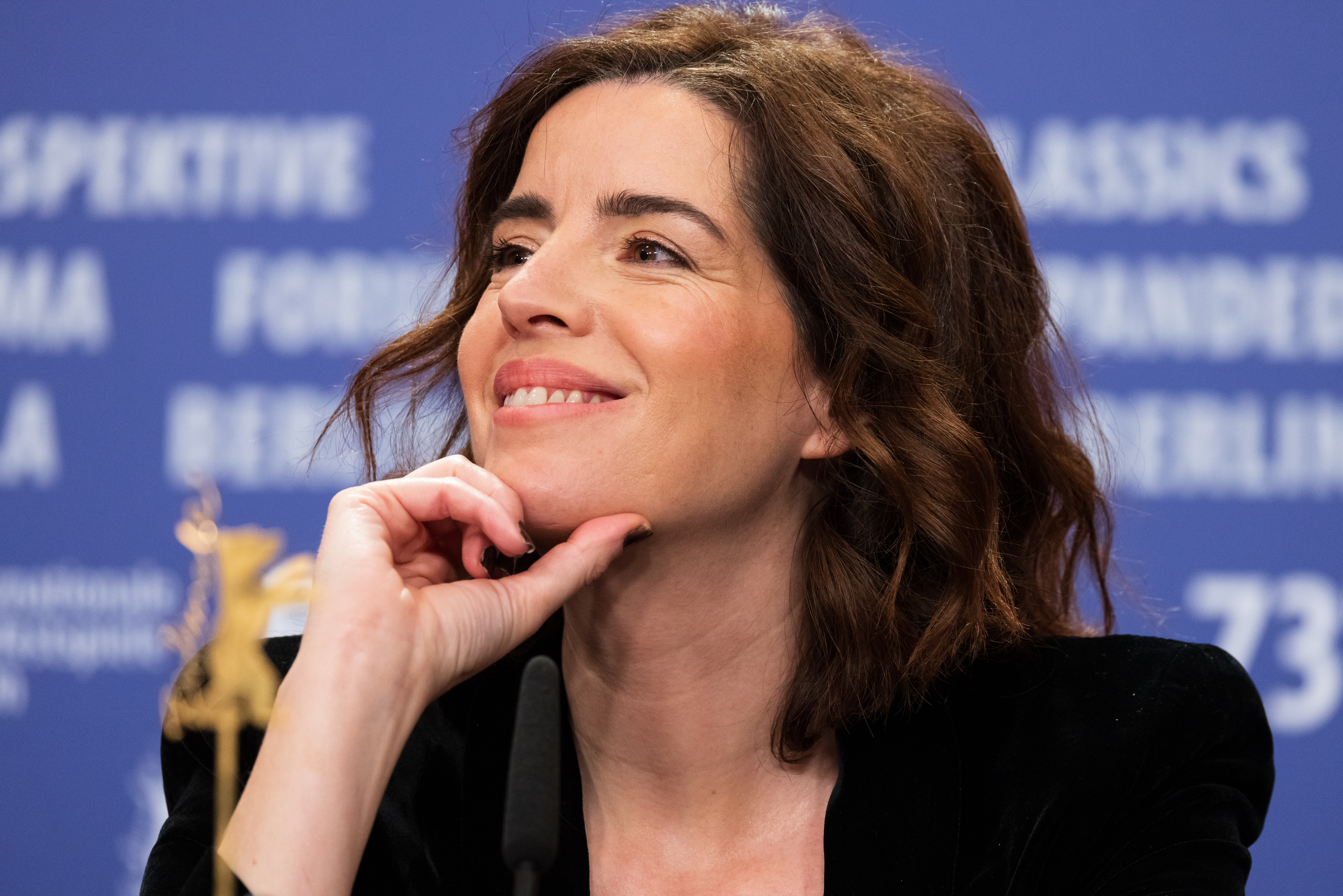
- Moreira in 2023
- Born: Dânia de Carvalho Neto; March 8, 1976 (age 50); Lisbon, Portugal
- Occupation: Actress
- Years active: 1997–present

Anabela Moreira (Lisbon, March 8, 1976) is a Portuguese actress and director, known for her work in Inspector Max, The Last Bath (2020), Blood of My Blood (2011) and Bad Living (2023), awarded with the Silver Bear Jury Prize at the 73rd Berlin International Film Festival. She has won twice the Best Actress award at the Portuguese Golden Globes.

== Biography ==
In 1997, Anabela had a special appearance in the series “Riscos”. In 2000 she joined the cast of the theatrical show “Trainspotting”. Meanwhile, she trained as an actress in workshops, and between September 2001 and December 2002, she attended the Actor Training Course at ACT - Escola de Atores. At the same time, she was a Psychology student at ISPA - Instituto Universitário and continued to work episodically, mainly on television. Soon she made it to the cinema and, in 2005, she had her first leading role in the film “Um Rio”, directed by José Carlos de Oliveira.

== Filmography ==
=== Cinema ===
- Upcoming – "Totem & Tabu" de Carlos Conceição
- Upcoming – “You Above All” de Lucas Elliot Eberl e Edgar Morais
- 2025 - "Justa" Teresa Villaverde
- 2024 – "Le Procès du Chien" Laetitia Dosch
- 2024 – “Caio”, curta-metragem, Vasco Nico G.
- 2024 – "Sobreviventes" José Barahona
- 2024 – “Estamos no Ar” Diogo Costa Amarante
- 2024 – "A Semente do Mal" Gabriel Abrantes
- 2023 – "Bad Living" João Canijo
- 2023 – "Viver Mal" João Canijo
- 2022 – “Nação Valente”, Carlos Conceição
- 2022 – “Fogo-Fátuo” João Pedro Rodrigues
- 2022 – “By Flávio”, curta-metragem, Pedro Cabeleira
- 2021 – “Nunca Nada Aconteceu”, Gonçalo Galvão Teles
- 2019 – “The Last Bath” David Bonneville
- 2018 – “Semente” João Santana
- 2018 – “Diamantino” Gabriel Abrantes and Daniel Schmidt
- 2018 – “Ruth” dAntónio Pinhão Botelho
- 2017 – “Fátima” João Canijo
- 2016 – “O Dia do meu Casamento” Anabela Moreira and João Canijo
- 2015 – “O Pátio das Cantigas” Leonel Vieira
- 2015 – “Renaissence” de Nuno Noivo and João RodriguesP*
- 2014 – “Segredo de Matar” Carlos Conceição
- 2012 – “É o Amor” de João Canijo
- 2012 – “Obrigação” João Canijo
- 2010 – “Sangue do Meu Sangue” de João Canijo
- 2010 – “Trabalho de Atriz, Trabalho de Ator” João Canijo
- 2010 – “Carne” Carlos Conceição
- 2009 – “Lucia Venice” Mayanne Von Ledebur
- 2009 – “Salomé” Cátia Silva
- 2008 – “Mal Nascida” João Canijo
- 2008 – “Chá da Tarde” Pedro Palma
- 2005 – “O Fatalista” João Botelho
- 2004 – “Valor das Palavras” João Seiça
- 2004 – “Um Rio” de José Carlos Oliveira
- 2003 – “Noite Escura” de João Canijo
- 2002 – “Ruy Blas” Jacques Weber
- 2002 – “O Amor É Kitsch” Rita Nunes
