= Blood of My Blood (2011 film) =

Portuguese drama film

- Film poster
- Portuguese: Sangue do Meu Sangue
- Directed by: João Canijo
- Written by: João Canijo
- Starring: Rafael Morais; Rita Blanco; Cleia Almeida; Anabela Moreira
- Release date: 5 October 2011 (Portugal)
- Country: Portugal
- Language: Portuguese

Blood of My Blood (Portuguese: Sangue do Meu Sangue) is a 2011 Portuguese drama film directed by João Canijo. The film premiered at the Toronto International Film Festival and was awarded at the San Sebastian International Film Festival, the Palm Springs International Film Festival, and the Miami International Film Festival, among others. It was the most commercially successful film of the year in Portugal.

The film was selected as the Portuguese entry for the Best Foreign Language Oscar at the 85th Academy Awards.

== Cast ==
- Rafael Morais as Joca Fialho
- Rita Blanco as Márcia Fialho
- Cleia Almeida as Cláudia Filipa Fialho
- Anabela Moreira as Ivete Fialho
- Marcello Urgeghe as Dr. Alberto Vieira
- Francisco Tavares as César Chaves
- Fernando Luís as Hélder
- Nuno Lopes as Telmo Sobral
- Beatriz Batarda as Maria da Luz

== Production ==
The final scene of Anabela Moreira and Nuno Lopes was particularly demanding for the actors given the physical, emotional and sexual violence. For the actress, it wasn't the nudity that bothered her, "but the scene was so vivid that Nuno Lopes hugged me, at the end, and apologized."

== Film Festivals Around the World ==
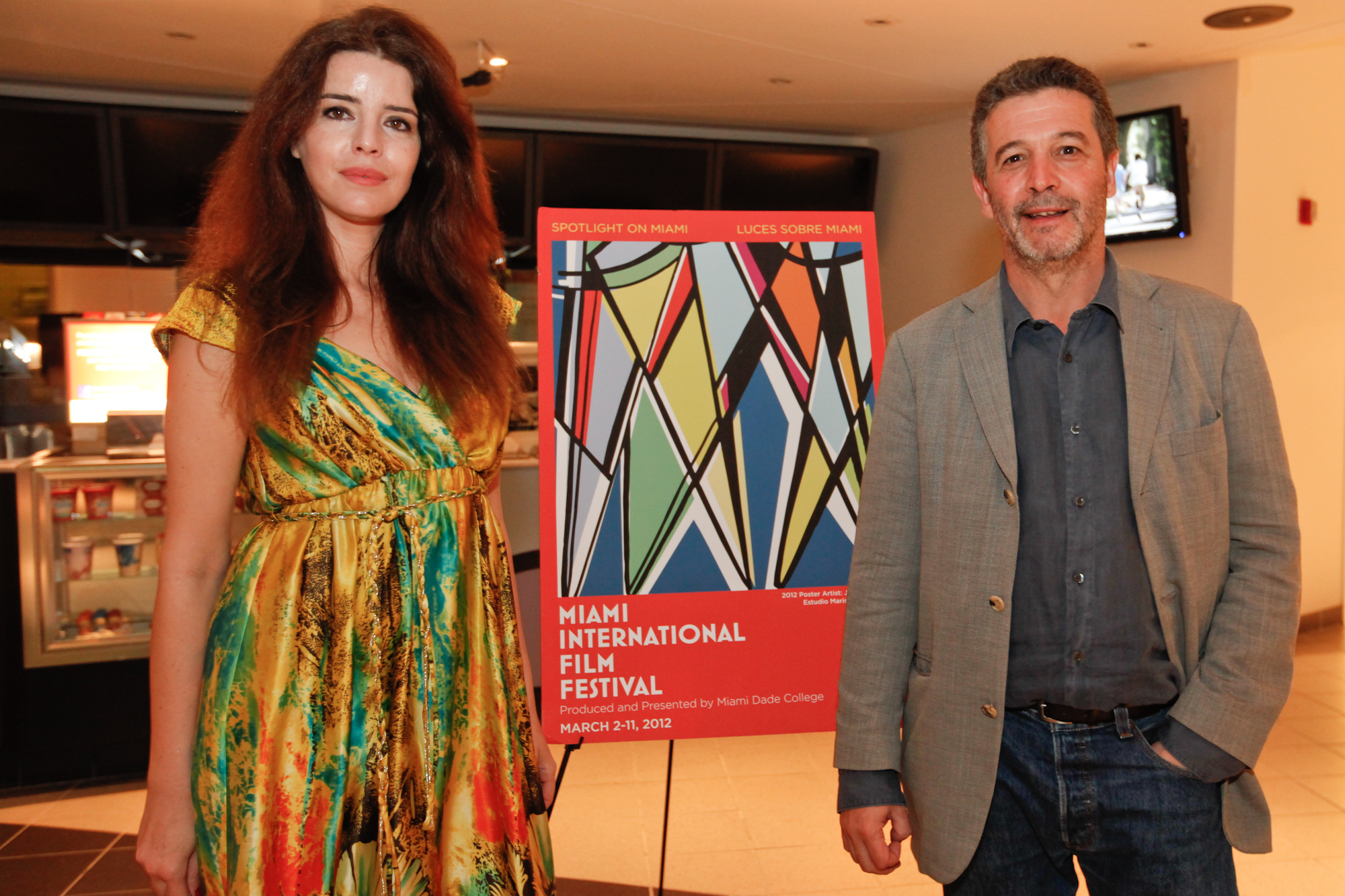
Actress Anabela Moreira and director João Canijo for Blood of My Blood at the Miami Film Festival (2012)

- Toronto International Film Festival... Canada
- Miami International Film Festival... USA
- Palm Springs International Film Festival... USA
- AFI Fest... USA
- Chicago International Film Festival... USA
- Austin Film Festival... USA
- Seattle International Film Festival... USA
- San Sebastian International Film Festival... Spain
- Busan Film Festival... South Korea
- Edinburgh Film Festival... UK
- Rio de Janeiro International Film Festival... Brazil
- Torino Film Festival... Italy
- Buenos Aires International Festival of Independent Cinema... Argentine
- La Rochelle... France
- Leeds Film Festival... UK
- Hamburg Film Festival... Germany
- Pau Film Festival... France
- Linz Film Festival... Austria
- Barcelona Film Festival... Spain
- Istanbul International Film Festival... Turkey
- Panama International Film Festival... Panama
- Transilvania International Film Festival... Romania
- Oaxaca Film Fest... Mexico
- Skopje Film Festival... Macedonia
- Berlin Film Festival... Germany

== See also ==
- List of submissions to the 85th Academy Awards for Best Foreign Language Film
- List of Portuguese submissions for the Academy Award for Best Foreign Language Film
