= Living Bad =

2023 film by João Canijo

- Official poster
- Portuguese: Viver Mal
- Directed by: João Canijo
- Written by: João Canijo
- Produced by: Pedro Borges
- Starring: Nuno Lopes; Leonor Silveira; Filipa Areosa; Rafael Morais
- Cinematography: Leonore Teles
- Edited by: João Braz
- Production companies: Midas Films; Les Films de l'Après-Midi
- Distributed by: Portuguese Film Agency
- Release dates: 23 February 2023 (Berlinale); 11 May 2023 (Portugal)
- Running time: 124 minutes
- Countries: Portugal; France
- Language: Portuguese
- Box office: $61,601

Living Bad (Portuguese: Viver Mal) is a 2023 Portuguese-French drama film directed by João Canijo. For his screenplay about the hotel guests, he was inspired by motifs from three plays by August Strindberg. Starring Nuno Lopes and Leonor Silveira, the film portrays the story of a family-run hotel by the northern shore of Portugal, which welcomes its guests over the weekend. It is selected in Encounter at the 73rd Berlin International Film Festival, where it had its world premiere on 23 February 2023. The film also featured in the list of Teddy Award.

At the same time, the director has made another film, Bad Living, in which the focus is on family running the hotel. Bad Living has also been selected at the 73rd Berlin International Film Festival in Competition.

== Synopsis ==
A family run hote in Ofir (municipality of Esposende), by the northern shore of Portugal, gets three families as its guests over the weekend. First is a man, who is torn between his wife and his mother. Second is a mother, who is enamoured with her daughter's suitor, so she encourages her marriage to enable her own love affair with her son-in-law. Third is also a mother, who wants to live her life through her daughter, so she is making her decisions. These three families are at the end of their cycles of acceptance.

== Cast ==
- Nuno Lopes as Jaime
- Filipa Areosa as Camila
- Leonor Silveira as Elisa
- Rafael Morais as Alex
- Lia Carvalho as Graça
- Beatriz Batarda as Judite
- Carolina Amaral as Alice
- Leonor Vasconselos as Julia
- Anabela Moreira as Piedade
- Rita Blanco as Sara
- Madalena Almeida as Salome
- Cleia Almeida as Raquel
- Vera Barreto as Angela

== Production ==
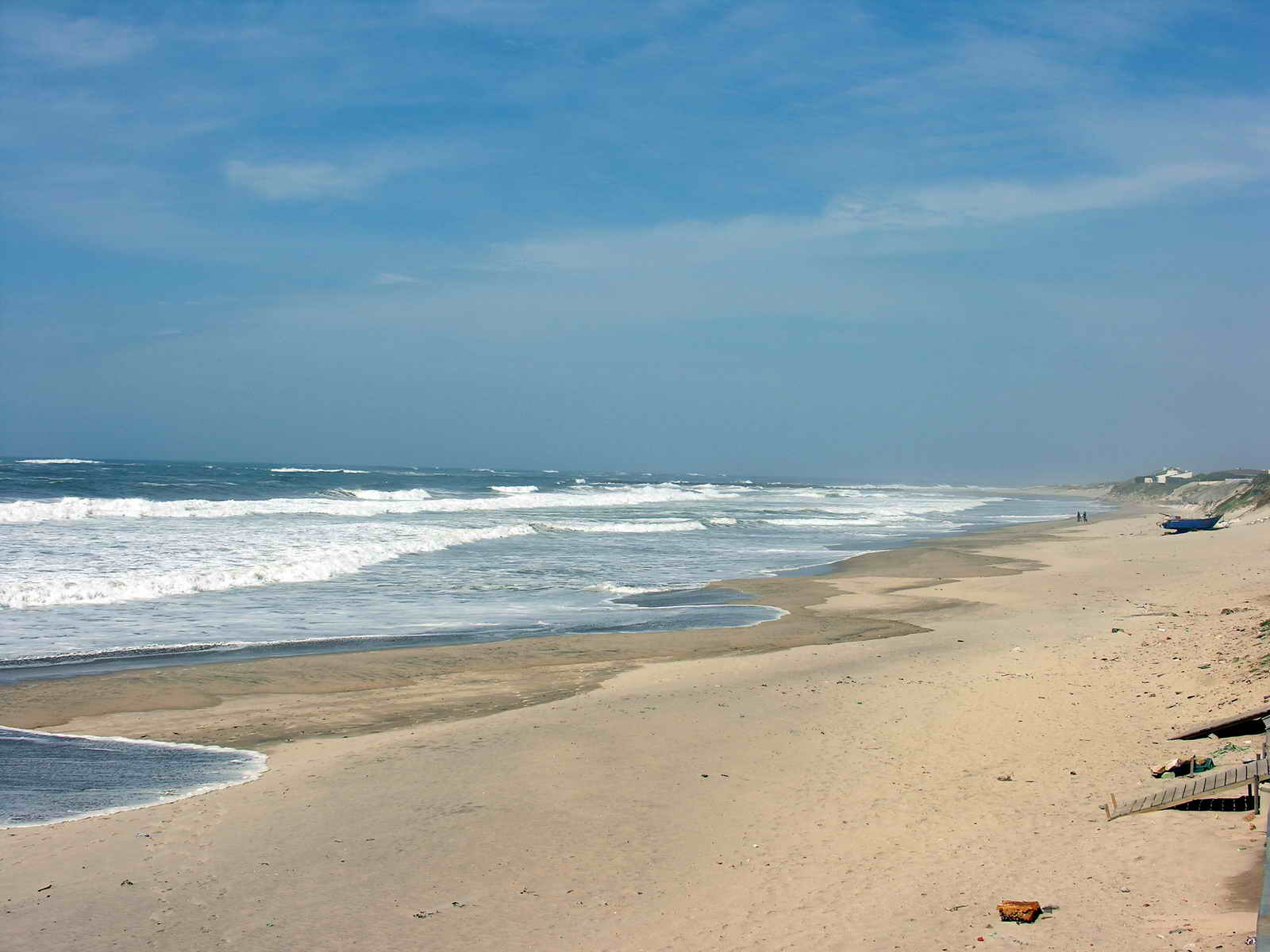
Praia de Ofir in 2005

The film was shot over a 12-week period in early 2021 at the Hotel Parque do Rio in Praia de Ofir. At the same time, Bad Living, a second film was made, that focuses on the female members of the hotel-owning family. According to a producer of the film, the sound and content are said to be "two completely different films". "One becomes more interesting when you see the other," explained the producer Pedro Borges. For his screenplay about the hotel guests, the director was inspired by motifs from plays by August Strindberg. He selected his three plays: Playing with Fire (1893), The Pelican (1907), and Motherly Love (1892) to build narrative of his film.

== Release ==
The film had its World premiere at the 73rd Berlin International Film Festival on 23 February 2023. It is slated for theatrical release in Portugal on 11 May 2023.

== Reception ==
Nicholas Bell in IonCinema.com graded the film 3.5/5 and wrote, "While these films aren't exactly love and marriage, as you can experience one quite effectively without the other, together they play like a dense novel of (mostly) unfortunate souls." Lee Marshall writing for ScreenDaily stated that the film is "A fascinating exercise in 'narrative reverse-shot' filmmaking." Concluding, Marshall wrote, "Living Bad's dramas are reduced to tiny storms in a teacup in one of a series of long-shots of the entire façade that function a little like the worldly-wise interventions of the chorus in a Greek tragedy."

== Accolades ==
Award	Date of ceremony	Category	Recipient	Result	Ref.
Berlin International Film Festival	26 February 2023	Golden Bear Plaque	Living Bad	Nominated	
