= Jogo de Damas =

- Directed by: Patrícia Sequeira
- Screenplay by: Filipa Leal
- Story by: Patrícia Sequeira; Filipa Leal
- Produced by: Leonor Coelho
- Starring: Ana Nave; Ana Padrão; Fátima Belo; Maria João Luís; Rita Blanco
- Cinematography: Renato Falcão
- Edited by: Nuno Santos Lopes
- Music by: David Rossi; Paula Sousa
- Production companies: R.I. FILMES; MasterDream – Digital Movie; SP Televisão
- Distributed by: Leopardo Filmes
- Release dates: November 11, 2015 (LEFFEST); January 28, 2016 (Portugal)
- Running time: 87 minutes
- Country: Portugal
- Language: Portuguese
- Budget: €140,000
- Box office: €24,064.72

Jogo de Damas (aka "Game of Checkers") is a 2015 Portuguese drama film directed and written by Patrícia Sequeira and Filipa Leal, and starring Ana Nave, Ana Padrão, Fátima Belo, Maria João Luís and Rita Blanco. It premiered on the Lisbon & Estoril Film Festival in November 2015 and was released in Portugal on January 28, 2016.

== Synopsis ==
Following Marta's wake, her five best friends decide to spend the night at a rural tourist getaway that Marta never got around to opening. That long night becomes a maze-like journey through their interconnecting friendships, where each reveals herself as it was the last day. On the eve of the burial, the talk is about life and a friendship that survived it all. But will this friendship be able to survive death?

== Cast ==
- Ana Nave as Maria
- Ana Padrão as Dalila
- Fátima Belo as Ema
- Maria João Luís as Ana
- Rita Blanco as Mónica

== Production ==
The film had a budget of €140,000 and the shooting took place in November 2014.

It is the first feature film of R.I. FILMES, the production company of Patrícia Sequeira.

== Reception ==
As of February 10, 2016, the film had grossed €24,064.72 and had 4,976 admissions, being the highest-grossing Portuguese film of the year so far at the Portuguese box office.

== International recognition ==
"Game of Checkers" has already received 20 awards, 30 nominations, and 21 official selections.
