= Bad Living =

2023 film by João Canijo

- Official poster
- Portuguese: Mal Viver
- Directed by: João Canijo
- Written by: João Canijo
- Produced by: Pedro Borges
- Starring: Anabela Moreira; Rita Blanco; Madalena Almeida; Cleia Almeida
- Cinematography: Leonor Teles
- Edited by: João Braz
- Production companies: Midas Films; Les Films de l'Après-Midi
- Release dates: 22 February 2023 (Berlinale); 11 May 2023 (Portugal)
- Running time: 127 minutes
- Countries: Portugal; France
- Language: Portuguese
- Box office: $85,485

Bad Living (Portuguese: Mal Viver) is a 2023 Portuguese-French drama film directed by João Canijo. Starring Anabela Moreira and Rita Blanco, the film portrays story of a family of several women from different generations, whose relationships with each other have grown poisoned by bitterness. It was selected to compete for the Golden Bear at the 73rd Berlin International Film Festival, where it had its world premiere on 22 February 2023. It won the Silver Bear Jury Prize at the festival. In September 2023, it was selected as the Portuguese entry in the Best International Feature Film category for the 96th Academy Awards.

At the same time, the director has made another film, Living Bad, in which the main focus is on guests coming to the hotel. The two films were released as a diptych. In his statement the director said that for the screenplay about the hotel guests, he was inspired by motifs from plays by August Strindberg. Living Bad was selected at the 73rd Berlin International Film Festival in Encounter. On December 7, it appeared in the eligible list for consideration for the 2024 Oscars, but, it didn't make it to the shortlist.

== Synopsis ==
A group of women from different generations of the same family is running a hotel in Ofir, (in the municipality of Esposende, by the northern shore of Portugal). Their relationships with each other have gone sour and they are trying to survive in the declining hotel. Then an unexpected arrival of a granddaughter stirs trouble, as the latent hatred and piled-up resentments comes to fore.

== Cast ==
- Anabela Moreira as Piedade
- Rita Blanco as Sara
- Madalena Almeida as Salome
- Cleia Almeida as Raquel
- Vera Barreto as Angela
- Nuno Lopes as Jaime
- Filipa Areosa as Camila
- Leonor Silveira as Elisa
- Rafael Morais as Alex
- Lia Carvalho as Graça
- Beatriz Batarda as Judite
- Carolina Amaral as Alice
- Leonor Vasconselos as Julia

== Production ==
The film was shot over a 12-week period in early 2021 at the Hotel Parque do Rio in Praia de Ofir. At the same time, Living Bad, a second film was made, that focuses on the guests of the hotel. According to a producer of the film, the sound and content are said to be "two completely different films". "One becomes more interesting when you see the other," explained the producer Pedro Borges.

== Release ==
The film had its world premiere at the 73rd Berlin International Film Festival on 22 February 2023. It is slated for theatrical release in Portugal on 11 May 2023.

== Reception ==
On the review aggregator Rotten Tomatoes website, the film has an approval rating of 75% based on 8 reviews, with an average rating of 8/10.

Nicholas Bell in IonCinema.com graded the film 4/5 and wrote, "But this is inherently the essence of Bad Living, concerning a handful of humans making decisions which actively poison them slowly, until someone invariably can’t take it any more." Leslie Felperin of The Hollywood Reporter calling the film "Bad to the bone" wrote, "Punishingly slow, grandiloquently depressing and ultimately not even especially convincing psychologically, Bad Living feels like the work of people who sincerely believed they were making great art." Felperin added, "Sadly, they were mistaken." Lee Marshall for ScreenDaily wrote in review, "A haunting work with a ritualistic feel, as if its five central characters have been possessed by the souls of some ancient Greek theatre troupe."

== Accolades ==
Award	Date	Category	Recipient	Result	Ref.
Berlin International Film Festival	25 February 2023	Silver Bear Jury Prize	Bad Living	Won	
Las Palmas de Gran Canaria International Film Festival	23 April 2023	Lady Harimaguada de Oro	Bad Living	Won	
Guadalajara International Film Festival	9 June 2024	Latin American Critics’ Award for European Films	Bad Living	Nominated	

== See also ==
- List of submissions to the 96th Academy Awards for Best International Feature Film
