= Odisseia (TV series) =

- Genre: Comedy
- Created by: Bruno Nogueira; Gonçalo Waddington; Tiago Guedes
- Directed by: Tiago Guedes
- Starring: Bruno Nogueira; Gonçalo Waddington; Tiago Guedes; Tiago Rodrigues; Nuno Lopes
- Opening theme: "Estou Além", by António Variações
- Country of origin: Portugal
- Original language: Portuguese
- No. of seasons: 1
- No. of episodes: 8

Production
- Camera setup: Multi-camera
- Running time: approximately 45 minutes
- Production company: Take it Easy

Original release
- Network: RTP1
- Release: January 20 – March 9, 2013

Odisseia is a Portuguese comedy television series. It originally aired on RTP1 in 2013.

== Concept ==
The series has two different plots. In the main storyline, the series follows a fictionalized version of Bruno and Gonçalo on a journey through Portugal. The second plot is the writers plot. In this one, Bruno and Gonçalo, as writers, discuss with the producer and the director about the scenes they are writing.

== Cast ==
=== Main cast ===
- Bruno Nogueira as Himself
- Gonçalo Waddington as Himself
- Tiago Guedes as Himself
- Tiago Rodrigues as Himself

=== Guest ===
- Nuno Lopes as Himself
- Rita Blanco as Herself
- Miguel Borges as Oráculo

== Episodes ==
| No. | Title | Directed by | Written by | Original release date |
|---|---|---|---|---|
| 1 | "Não te atrevas, ó musa..." | Tiago Guedes | Bruno Nogueira, Gonçalo Waddington & Tiago Guedes | January 20, 2013 |
| 2 | "Harry Dean Stanton" | Tiago Guedes | Bruno Nogueira, Gonçalo Waddington & Tiago Guedes | January 27, 2013 |
| 3 | "Não foi por mal!" | Tiago Guedes | Bruno Nogueira, Gonçalo Waddington & Tiago Guedes | February 3, 2013 |
| 4 | "Antes dum gang-bang eu só digo disparates" | Tiago Guedes | Bruno Nogueira, Gonçalo Waddington & Tiago Guedes | February 9, 2013 |
| 5 | "Só temo o que lá vou encontrar e depois de lá não poder regressar" | Tiago Guedes | Bruno Nogueira, Gonçalo Waddington & Tiago Guedes | February 16, 2013 |
| 6 | "Variações" | Tiago Guedes | Bruno Nogueira, Gonçalo Waddington & Tiago Guedes | February 23, 2013 |
| 7 | "Era um acordo de cavalheiros!" | Tiago Guedes | Bruno Nogueira, Gonçalo Waddington & Tiago Guedes | March 2, 2013 |
| 8 | "Cinquenta mil, seiscentos e setenta e nove euros e sessenta e cinco cêntimos" | Tiago Guedes | Bruno Nogueira, Gonçalo Waddington & Tiago Guedes | March 9, 2013 |

== Broadcast history ==
| Season | Time Slot |
|---|---|
| 1 (2013) | Sunday at 9:00 pm (January 20, 2013 - February 3, 2013); Saturday at 9:00 pm (February 9, 2013 - April 13, 2013) |
