= Saint George (film) =

2016 film

- Film poster
- Directed by: Marco Martins
- Written by: Marco Martins
- Starring: Nuno Lopes
- Release dates: 1 September 2016 (Venice); 9 March 2017 (Portugal)
- Running time: 112 minutes
- Country: Portugal
- Language: Portuguese
- Box office: $257,552

Saint George (Portuguese: São Jorge) is a 2016 Portuguese drama film directed by Marco Martins. It was selected as the Portuguese entry for the Best Foreign Language Film at the 90th Academy Awards, but it was not nominated.

== Plot ==
Facing hard times, a former boxer must become a debt collector to provide for his family.

== Cast ==
- Nuno Lopes as Jorge
- Mariana Nunes as Susana
- David Semedo as Nelson
- José Raposo as Vitinho
- Jean-Pierre Martins as Albano

== See also ==
- List of submissions to the 90th Academy Awards for Best Foreign Language Film
- List of Portuguese submissions for the Academy Award for Best Foreign Language Film
