= In the Darkness of the Night =

2004 film

- Film poster
- Directed by: João Canijo
- Written by: João Canijo; Pierre Hodgson; Mayanna von Ledebur
- Produced by: Paulo Branco
- Starring: Fernando Luís
- Cinematography: Mário Castanheira
- Edited by: João Braz
- Release date: 21 October 2004
- Running time: 94 minutes
- Country: Portugal
- Language: Portuguese

In the Darkness of the Night (Portuguese: Noite Escura) is a 2004 Portuguese drama film directed by João Canijo. It was screened in the Un Certain Regard section at the 2004 Cannes Film Festival.

== Cast ==
- Fernando Luís as Nelson Pinto
- Rita Blanco as Celeste Pinto
- Beatriz Batarda as Carla Pinto
- Cleia Almeida as Sónia Pinto
- Natalya Simakova as Irka (as Nataliya Zymakova)
- José Raposo as Nicolau, Nelson's Associate
- Dmitry Bogomolov as Fyodor
- João Reis as Sónia's Boyfriend
- Anna Belozorovich as Olga
- Antonio Ferreira as Pressure Cooker
- Ramón Martinez as Sebastião
- Ana Luísa Leão as Paloma
- Anabela Moreira as Rute
- Helena Alves as Iris
- Jinie Rainho as Brigina
