= Get a Life (film) =

2001 film

- Directed by: João Canijo
- Written by: João Canijo; Pierre Hodgson; Celine Pouillon
- Produced by: Paulo Branco
- Starring: Rita Blanco
- Cinematography: Mário Castanheira
- Edited by: João Braz
- Release date: 4 May 2001
- Running time: 115 minutes
- Country: Portugal
- Language: Portuguese

Get a Life (Portuguese: Ganhar a Vida) is a 2001 Portuguese drama film directed by João Canijo. It was screened in the Un Certain Regard section at the 2001 Cannes Film Festival.

== Cast ==
- Rita Blanco - Cidália
- Adriano Luz - Adelino
- Teresa Madruga - Celestina
- Alda Gomes - Alda
- Olivier Leite - Orlando
- Maria David - Lùcia
- Yvette Caldas - Fàtima
- Jinie Rainho - Jinie
- Adélia Baltazar - Fernanda
- Luis Rego - Adérito
- Antonio Ferreira - Manuel
- Tiago Manaïa - Alvaro
- José Raposo
- Teresa Roby
