= Ana Cristina de Oliveira =

Portuguese model and actress (born 1973)

- Born: Ana Cristina Campos Seara de Oliveira; 24 July 1973 (age 53); Lisbon, Portugal
- Occupations: Model; actress
- Years active: 1991–present
- Modeling information
- Height: 1.75 m (5 ft 9 in)
- Hair color: Light Brown
- Eye color: Hazel

Ana Cristina Campos Seara de Oliveira (born 24 July 1973) is a Portuguese model and actress.

== Early life and career ==
Oliveira was born in Lisbon, Portugal. Her father worked in the Portuguese radio industry while her mother worked in a Lisbon movie theater. An an only child, she originally wanted to become a journalist.

In 1996, Oliveira was featured on Bryan Adams' music video "The Only Thing That Looks Good on Me Is You". In 1999, she starred in the music video for Chris Cornell's single "Can't Change Me".

In 2006, she won the Prix d'interpretation Janine Bazin (Best Actress) at the Entrevues Belfort film festival for her portrayal of the title role in the feature film Odete (also known as Two Drifters). She is internationally known for playing roles in American films Taxi, Miami Vice, television (CSI: Miami), and advertising for Levi's in 1996.

She is a graduate with Departmental Highest Honors in Art History from University of California, Los Angeles.

== Awards and nominations ==
Year	Award	Category	Work	Results
2006	Golden Globe (Portugal)	Best Actress	Odete	Nominated
