= Bruno Nogueira =

Portuguese actor

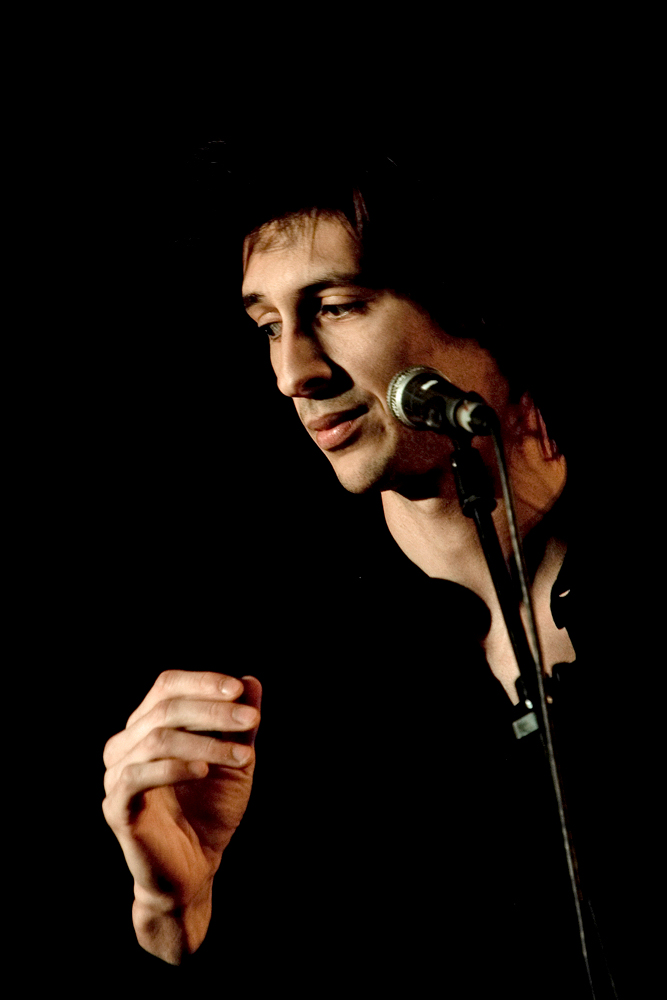
- Born: 31 January 1982 (age 43); Lisbon, Portugal
- Occupations: Actor; comedian; writer; television host
- Years active: 2000–present
- Partner: Beatriz Batarda (2013–present)
- Children: 1

Bruno Miguel Alexandre da Cunha Nogueira (born 31 January 1982) is a Portuguese actor, comedian, writer and television host.

== Career ==
He started his career as an actor on a soap opera called "Anjo Selvagem" in 2002. In 2003, he started hosting Curto Circuito on the cable channel Sic Radical. However, it was through stand-up comedy that he became best known, in programmes such as "Levanta-te e Ri" (2003–06), "Manobras de Diversão" (2004–05) or "HermanSIC" (2004–05).

In 2008, he started the comedy show Os Contemporâneos, relying primarily on satire of current political and social issues. The final episode aired on 2 August 2009. In April 2010, he started hosting Lado B (the B side), his own talk show.

Nogueira created Odisseia with Gonçalo Waddington and Tiago Guedes in 2013.
