= Two Drifters =

2005 film

- Directed by: João Pedro Rodrigues
- Starring: Ana Cristina Oliveira
- Production company: Rosa Filmes
- Release date: 2005
- Country: Portugal
- Language: Portuguese

Two Drifters (also known as Odete) is a Portuguese feature film directed by João Pedro Rodrigues, produced at the independent production company Rosa Filmes and released in 2005.

== Reception ==
- Cannes Film Festival, 2005 – Méntion Spécial Cinémas de Recherche
- Festival de Cine de Bogotá, 2005 – Bronze Precolumbian Circle
- Festival Entre Vues de Belfort, 2005 – Best Actress for Ana Cristina de Oliveira
- Festival do Rio, 2005
- Milan Film Festival, 2006 – Special mention of the jury
- Bratislava International Film Festival, 2005) – Great Award
- São Paulo International Film Festival, 2005
- Paths of the Portuguese cinema - Best Feature
- Lagos Film Festival, 2006) – Best Supporting Actress for Teresa Madruga
- Seattle International Film Festival, 2006 – Contemporary World Cinema
- Bangkok International Film Festival, 2006
- Portuguese Golden Globes, 2006 - Nomination for the categories of Best Film and Best Actress (Ana Cristina Oliveira)
