= Teatro Animação de Setúbal =

Teatro Animação de Setúbal (TAS) is a Portuguese professional theatre company. It has been active with theatrical and cultural activities continuously since 1976.

It was founded in Setúbal in 1976 by actors Carlos César, Carlos Daniel, António Assunção and Francisco Costa. The theatre takes into account the cultural diversity of the region in which it operates. The theatre also invests in the training of younger people and developing educational initiatives and nurturing young talent.
