= Portuguese Association of Theatre Critics =

The Portuguese Association of Theatre Critics or Associação Portuguesa de Críticos de Teatro (APCT) is the leading theatrical critic association in Portugal. Although it dates back to before the 25th of April 1974, it was formally established on 28 November 1984. Its head office is located at 31 Avenida Duque de Loulé, in Lisbon.
