= Patrícia Sequeira (film director) =

Portuguese filmmaker

- Born: 22 October 1972 (age 53); Lisbon, Portugal
- Occupations: Director; producer; writer

Patrícia Sequeira (born 22 October 1972) is a Portuguese filmmaker, best known for having directing the Emmy-winning telenovela Laços de Sangue and the films Jogo de Damas, Snu and Bem Bom.

== Filmography ==
Cinema

- 2015 - Jogo de Damas
- 2019 - Snu (about Snu Abecassis and Sá Carneiro)
- 2020 - Bem Bom

Television

- 2008 - Vila Faia (série da RTP)
- 2008 - Liberdade 21 (série da RTP)
- 2009 - Perfeito Coração (telenovela da SIC)
- 2010 - Cidade Despida (série da RTP)
- 2010 - Laços de Sangue (telenovela da SIC)
- 2013 - Sol de Inverno (telenovela da SIC)
- 2013 - Depois do Adeus (série da RTP)
- 2014 - Mar Salgado (telenovela da SIC)
- 2016 - Amor Maior (telenovela da SIC)
- 2016 - Terapia (série da RTP)
- 2018 - Verão M (série da RTP)
- 2019 - Um Desejo de Natal (telefilme da SIC)
- 2020 - O Clube (série da OPTO)
- 2021 - Prisão Domiciliária (série da OPTO)
- 2024 - Erro 404 (série da RTP)
