= Laços de Sangue =

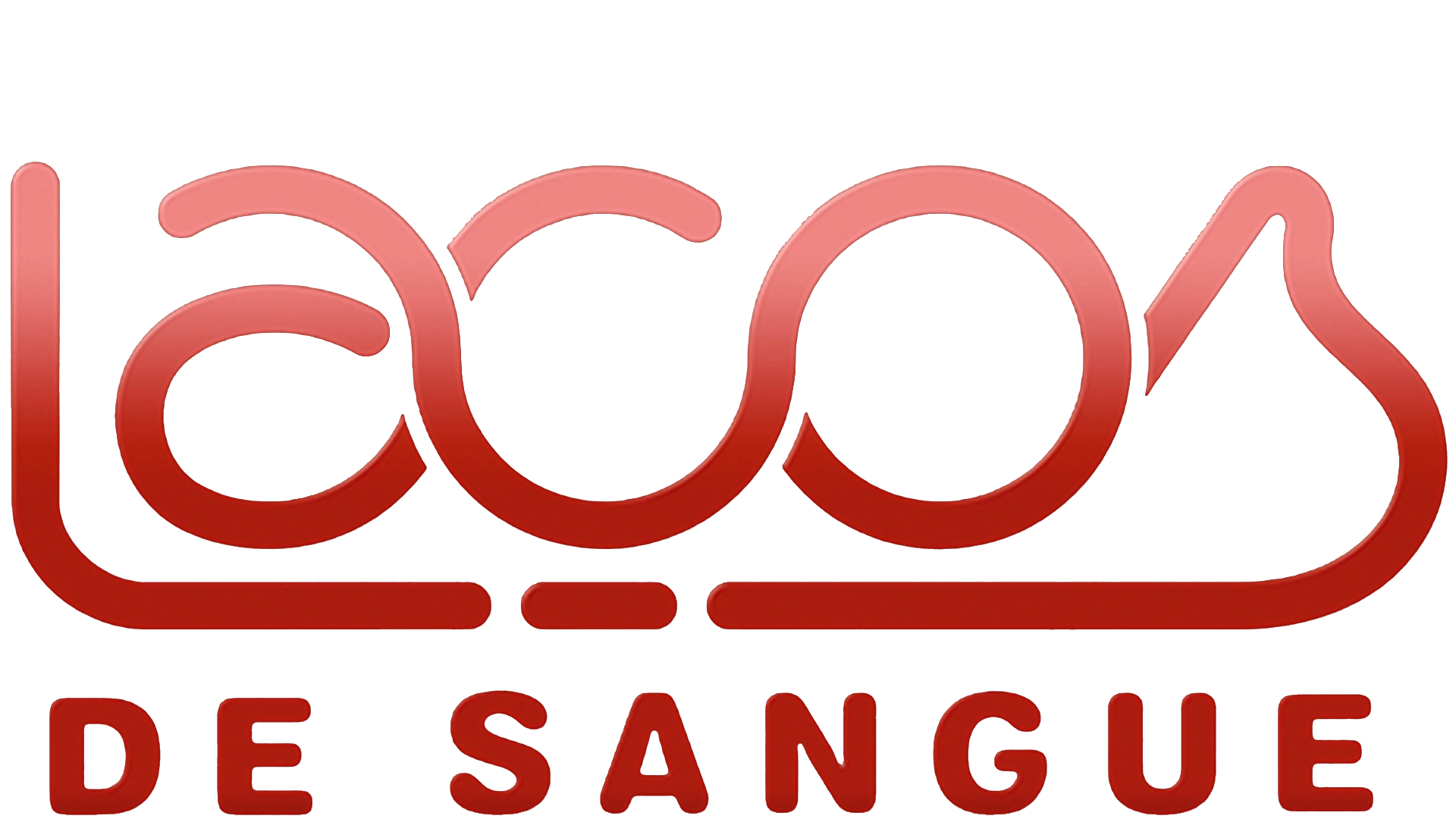
- Genre: Telenovela
- Created by: Pedro Lopes
- Directed by: Bruno José; Patrícia Sequeira
- Starring: Diana Chaves; Diogo Morgado; Joana Santos
- Countries of origin: Portugal; Brazil
- Original language: Portuguese
- No. of seasons: 1
- No. of episodes: 322

Production
- Producers: SP Televisão; SIC; Rede Globo
- Production location: Carnaxide
- Running time: 60 minutes

Original release
- Network: SIC
- Release: September 13, 2010 – October 2, 2011

Laços de Sangue (lit. Blood Ties) is a Portuguese-Brazilian telenovela which broadcast on SIC from September 2010 to October 2011. It is a co-production between SIC and Brazilian Rede Globo. Laços de Sangue won the International Emmy Award for Best Telenovela in 2011.

== Plot ==
In 1984, two sisters, Inês and Marta have a picnic with their parents by a river. As they start fighting over a doll, both fall into the strong currents of a river. Their father jumps in the water and manages to save Inês, the oldest, but Marta is nowhere to be found and is presumed dead. Their mother, pregnant with a boy, witnesses everything, and grieves the death of her husband (who died rescuing his daughters), and supposedly, of her youngest daughter.

Jumping back to 2010, Inês has grown into a strong and kind person; she owns and manages Restaurant M with her mother and is in love with João, a doctor who constantly volunteers in humanitarian causes. After a campaign in the Amazon, João proposes to Inês, only for multiple tragedies to strike. First, at João's family house, Tiago (younger brother of Inês and Marta), tries to steal the family unbeknownst to Inês, resulting in João's pregnant sister finding him and accidentally getting shot, resulting in her death. Inês is the first to the scene, but only registers Tiago's upper back tattoo with the symbols of the 4 playing card suits. João's grandfather also suffers a stroke.

Meanwhile, Marta, who survived falling to the river, is abandoned and wanders alone in the surrounding forest, ending up being found by a couple who adopts her and names her Diana. Despite the loving upbringing, Diana grows to be very power-hungry. Inês, however, developed PTSD and completely forgot her past, beyond becoming deathly afraid of water and swimming. When Diana hears her adoptive parents fighting about not being her real parents, Diana remembers everything and forces her adoptive parents to help her find her biological family, to whom she swears revenge.

Fueled by rage and willing to go to any lengths to enact her plots, Diana focuses on Inês and promises she'll steal everything from her, believing Inês had stolen a life of materialism, love, and happiness from her all those years ago.

=== Ending ===
Throughout the story, Diana enacted multiple plots with the help of Ricardo, who fell in love with her. This included: throwing herself down the stairs (making it seem that Inês pushed her), finding out about Tiago's role in killing João's sister, kidnapping Inês, throwing Inês and herself down a cliff to a river (only to then come back pretending she had amnesia), among others. On the final episodes, Diana started resorting to murder, including killing their own mom at her husband's grave and driving Ricardo to commit suicide in front of her.

Her final plot is just as evil: in order to give Inês a false sense of peace, she enlists the help of a doctor and a grave digger in order to fake her own death. She is drugged and Inês plans a funeral, relieved to be rid of her sister. The plan would then have the grave digger dig Diana's coffin back up. He, however, is distracted by a friend to go have some alcohol, and dies in a motorcycle accident. Diana wakes up in the coffin, realizing she cannot get out, she manages to call Portuguese Emergency Services on her phone; she, however, asphyxiates and dies by the time they pick up.

== Cast ==
- Diana Chaves as Inês
- Diogo Morgado as João
- Joana Santos as Diana/Marta
- Dânia Neto as Marisa

== Awards and nominations ==
Year	Award	Category	Result	Ref.
2011	International Emmy Award	Best Telenovela	Won	

== International Broadcast ==
The series also broadcast in several Latin American countries, including Argentina, Uruguay, Brazil, Bolivia, Ecuador, Paraguay, Peru, Dominican Republic, Costa Rica, and Nicaragua. In May 2014, Laços de Sangue began broadcasting in Angola on TV Zimbo and in Italy on Rai 1 where it is titled Legami. In Indonesia, the series aired on NET. beginning October 26, 2019 under the title Inês & Diana.
