= João Brites =

Portuguese theatre director and artist

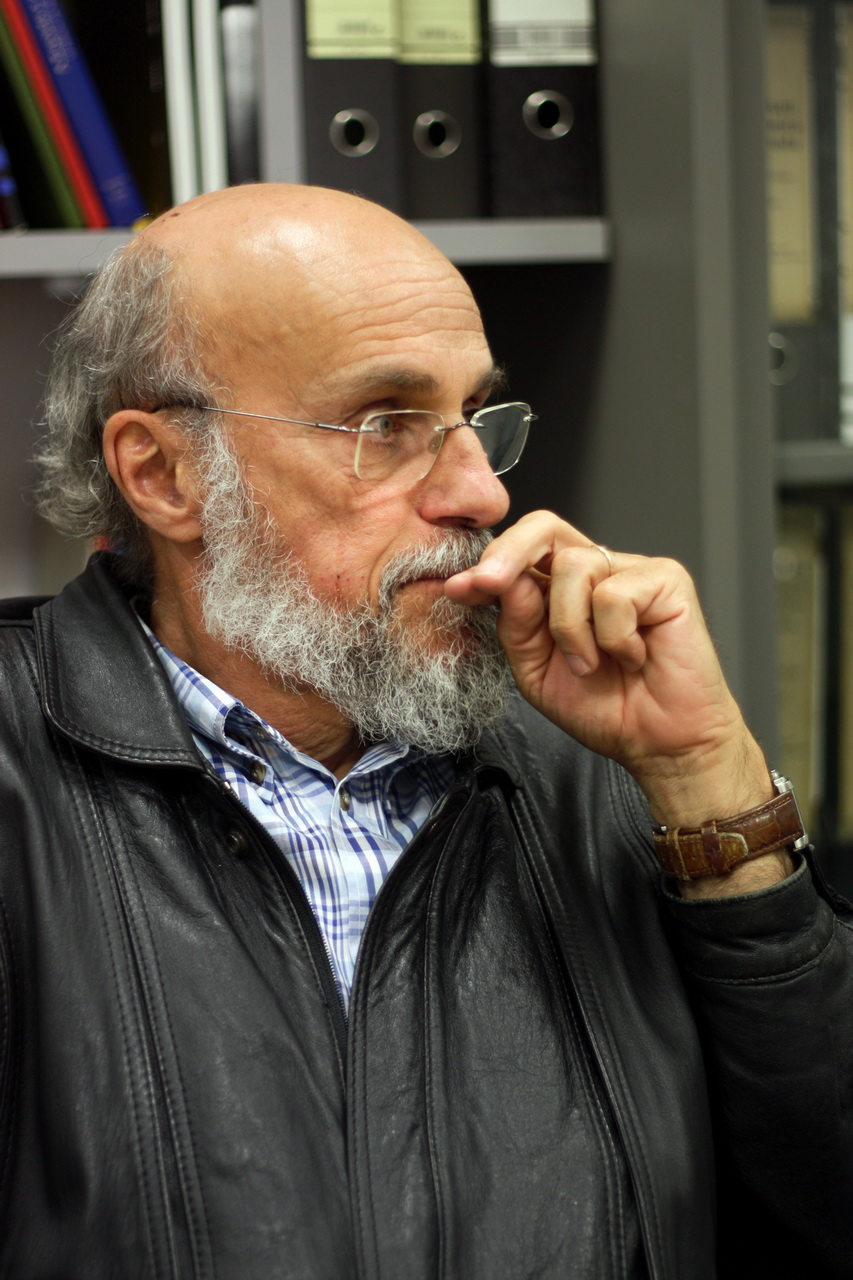
João Brites, May 2009

João Brites (born 1947 in Torres Novas), is a Portuguese theatre director and artist. He founded the Teatro O Bando in Lisbon in 1974 and as served as its director since. He is also a professor of the School of Theater and Cinema in Lisbon.

Brites is also an artist and set designer and he attended courses in painting and engraving at the Ecole Nationale Superieure des Arts Visuals - La Cambre. He has held various art exhibitions in the galleries and museums in Portugal and has also published many articles on theater arts and the creative process of theatre, developing a practical in-theoretical discourse about acting.

He was appointed a Commander of the Ordem do Mérito in 1999.
