= Inês Aguiar =

Portuguese actress (born 1998)

- Born: Inês Várzea Aguiar; 12 August 1998 (age 28); Lisbon, Portugal
- Occupation: Actress
- Years active: 2014–present
- Relatives: Joana Aguiar (twin sister)

Inês Várzea Aguiar (Portuguese pronunciation: [iˈneʒ ɐɣiˈaɾ]; born 12 August 1998) is a Portuguese actress. She is best known for her roles on the television series Mar Salgado (2014–2016) and Paixão (2017–2018).

== Biography ==
Aguiar was born in Lisbon. She has a twin sister, Joana, who is also an actress. They also have two younger sisters, Sofia and Madalena. She studied dentistry at university.

She began acting in commercials at the age of 10. She made her television debut on the telenovela Mar Salgado in 2014. She later appeared in the television series Rainha das Flores and Paixão.

=== Personal life ===
Aguiar is in a relationship with Swedish footballer Viktor Gyökeres.

== Filmography ==
=== Film ===
Year	Title	Role	Ref.
2018	Leviano	Mafalda Magalhães	
2024	Chuva de Verão	Lua	

=== Television ===
Year	Title	Role	Ref.
2014–2016	Mar Salgado	Carlota Queiroz Vaz	
2016–2017	Rainha das Flores	Rita	
2017	Ministério do Tempo	Constança	
2017–2018	Paixão	Vera Veloso	
2020–2021	Bem me Quer	Laura Cunha	
2022	Quero é Viver	Dora	
2023	Queridos Papás	Sol	
2024–2025	A Fazenda	Mafalda Borges Lacerda	
2026	Quem Matou o Galo de Barcelos?	Beatriz Barcelos	
