= João Canijo =

Portuguese film director (1957–2026)

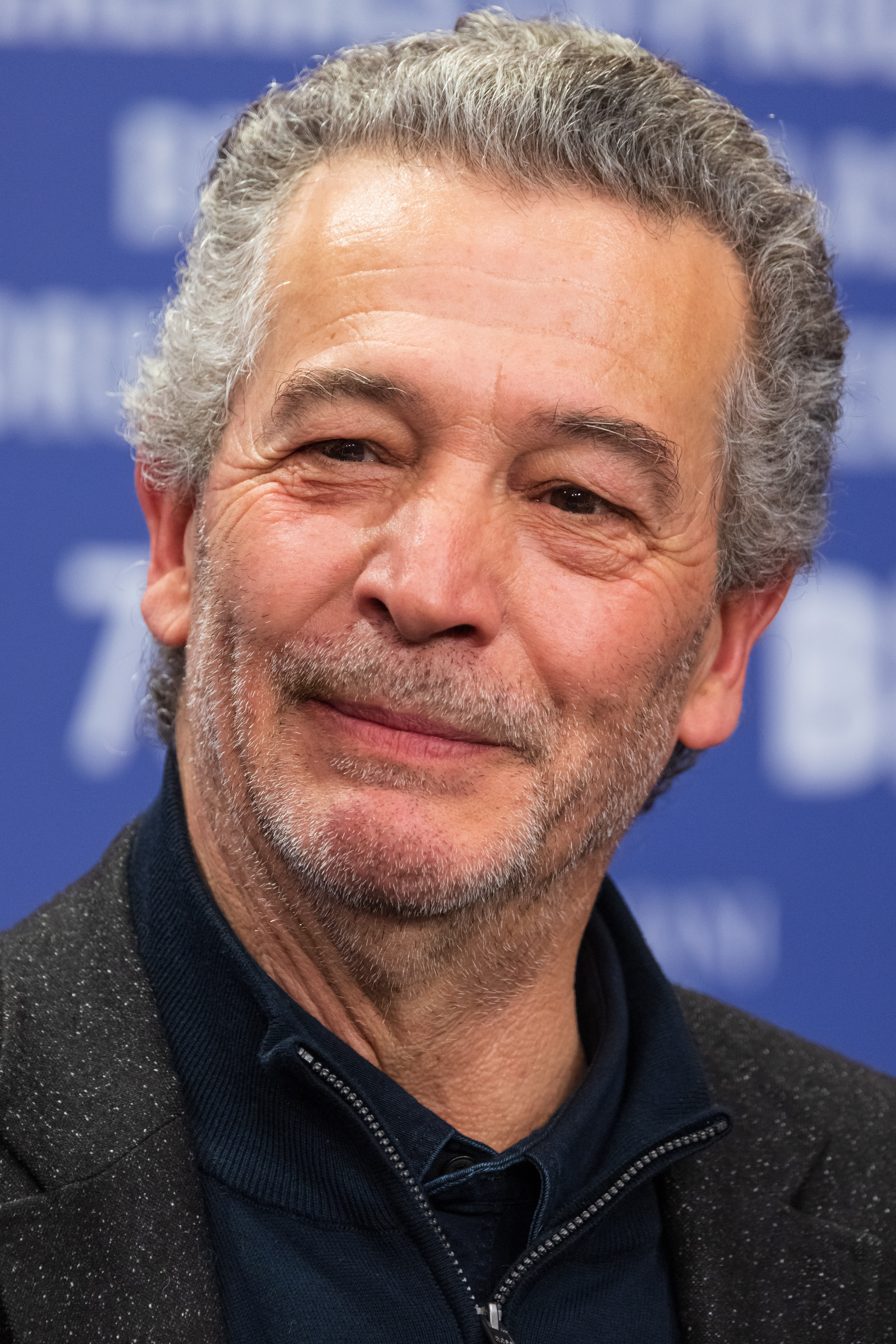
- Canijo in 2023
- Born: João Altavilla Canijo; 10 December 1957; Porto, Portugal
- Died: 29 January 2026 (aged 68); Vila Viçosa, Portugal
- Occupations: Film director, screenwriter
- Years active: 1984–2026

João Altavilla Canijo (10 December 1957 – 29 January 2026) was a Portuguese film director. His film Get a Life was screened in the Un Certain Regard section at the 2001 Cannes Film Festival. His 2011 film Blood of My Blood was selected as the Portuguese entry for the Best Foreign Language Oscar at the 85th Academy Awards, but it did not make the final shortlist.

His 2023 film Bad Living won the Silver Bear Jury Prize at the 73rd Berlin International Film Festival.

Before his directorial debut, Canijo worked as assistant director for Wim Wenders in The State of Things (1982) and for Werner Schroeter in The Rose King (1986).

Canijo died on 29 January 2026, at the age of 68.

== Filmography ==
- Três Menos Eu (1988)
- Lovely Child/ Filha da Mãe (1989)
- Alentejo Sem Lei (1990)
- Black Shoes/ Sapatos Pretos (1998)
- Get a Life/ Ganhar a Vida (2001)
- In the Darkness of the Night/ Noite Escura (2004)
- Misbegotten/ Mal Nascida (2008)
- Lusitanian Illusion (2010)
- Blood of My Blood/Sangue do Meu Sangue (2011)
- É o Amor (Obrigação)
- Bad Living (2023)
- Living Bad (2023)

== See also ==
- Jorge Ferreira Chaves
