= Nuno Lopes =

Portuguese actor (born 1978)

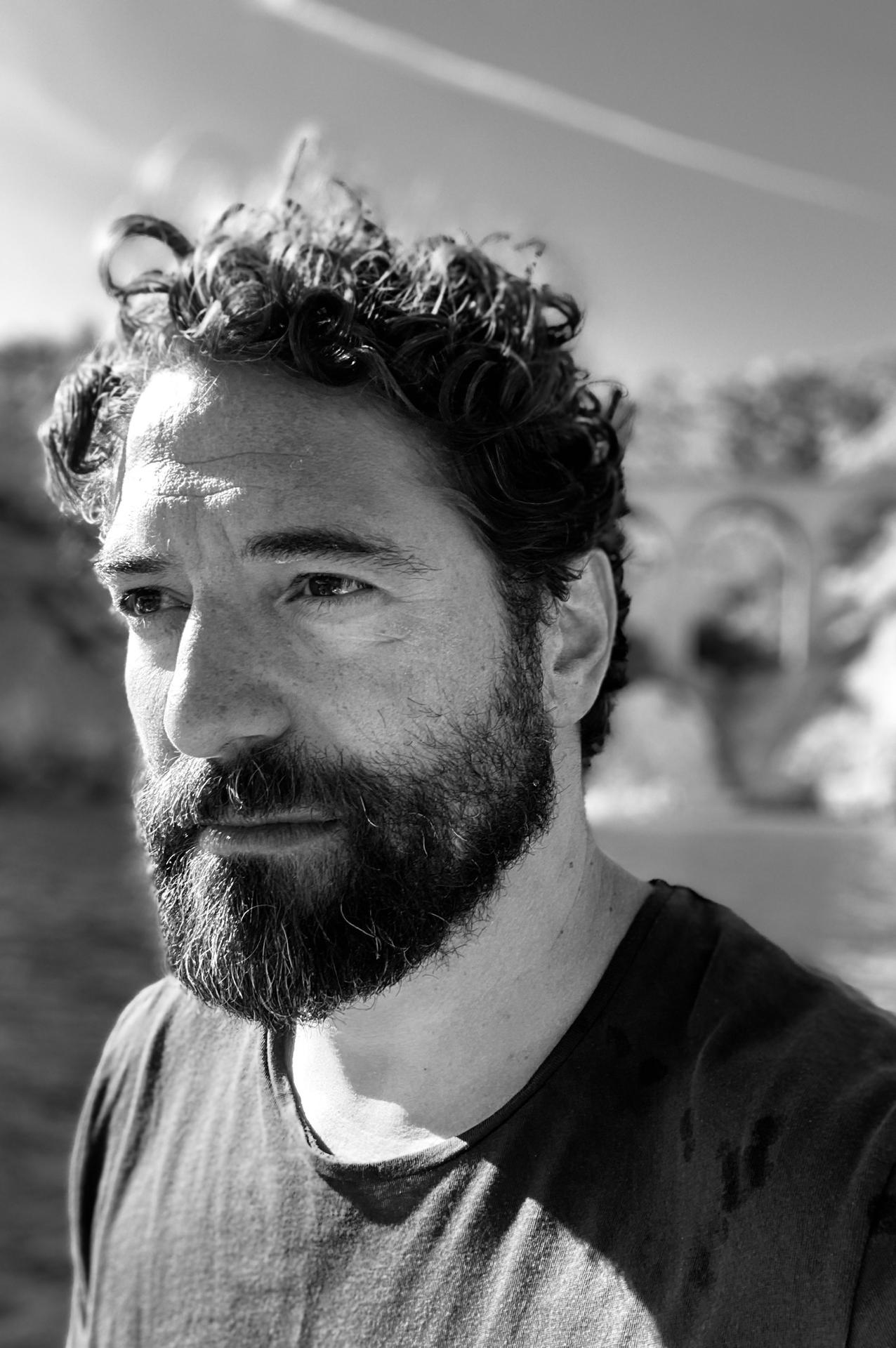
- Lopes in 2020
- Born: 6 May 1978 (age 47); Lisbon, Portugal
- Occupations: Actor; DJ
- Years active: 1991–present

Nuno Miguel Pereira Lopes (born 6 May 1978) is a Portuguese actor and DJ. He's internationally known for his role in Saint George, the Portuguese entry for the Best Foreign Language Film at the 90th Academy Awards, and most recently for his role at Netflix TV series, White Lines as Duarte "Boxer" Silva.

== Career ==
Nuno Lopes was born in Lisbon. He graduated from the Lisbon Theatre and Film School, attended the Master Class at the École des Maîtres, and invested in studying abroad, being taught by Robert Castle, Susan Batson, Tom Brangle e Wass M. Stevens. Complementing his acting career, he has acquired additional skills during his formation: artistic fencing, dance, singing and music.

His wide experience in theatre was built with the acting of pieces by renowned playwrights, like Bertold Brecht, William Shakespeare, August Strindberg, Heiner Muller, Georges Perec, Beaumarchais, Ferenc Molnár and Pierre Corneille. Among them are Man Equals Man, Cymbeline and The Marriage of Figaro.

== Filmography ==
=== Film ===
Year	Title	Role	Notes
1991	Project: Parallel World		Short film
1995	God's Comedy	Third kid	
2000	Moonfish	António	
2001	Off to the Revolution in a 2CV	Soldier Largo do Carmo	
2002	António, A Boy From Lisbon	Man in Yellow	
2003	Quaresma	Filomeno	
2003	O Corneteiro Lopes	Corporal Corneteiro Lopes	Short film
2004	My Mother	The Doctor	
2005	Lastro	Rodrigo	Short film
2005	Alice	Mário	
2008	Todos os Passos		Short film, voice role
2008	O Senso dos Desatinados	François Villon	Short film
2008	Goodnight Irene	Bruno	
2008	This Night	Aboud	
2008	Noise		
2011	Blood of My Blood	Telmo Sobral	
2011	Sunflare		Short film
2011	Side Effects	Rui	
2012	So So	Pedro	
2012	Operation Libertad	Baltos	
2012	Lines of Wellington	Sargent Francisco Xavier	
2012	Operation Autumn	Ernesto Lopes Ramos	
2013	Obsessive Rhythms	Furio	
2015	The Portuguese Falcon	Comuninja	
2016	An Outpost of Progress	João de Mattos	
2016	Saint George	Jorge	
2017	Joaquim	Matias	
2017	Menina	João Palmeira	
2018	The Great Mystical Circus	Coriolano	
2018	With The Wind	Samuel Nieves	
2018	Sea	Toni	
2019	No Filter	Bernard	
2019	An Easy Girl	Andres	
2021	Great Yarmouth: Provisional Figures	Carlos	
2022	Azuro	L'homme	
2022	Os Demonios do Meu Avô	João	(voice)
2022	Everybody Loves Jeanne	Vitor	
2023	Bad Living	Jaime	
2023	Living Bad	Jaime	

=== Television ===
Year	Title	Role
1997	Riscos	
1999	Diário de Maria	Cesário
2000	A Senhora Ministra	Nuno
2000	A Noiva	Coelho
2000	Crianças SOS	Coach
2000	Ajuste de Contas	Carlos
2000–2002	Herman SIC	Various Roles
2001	Programa da Maria	Various Roles
2001	Odisseia na Tenda	Ruben
2002	O Fabuloso Destino de Diácono Remédios	
2002	Terra Speranza	José Manuel
2002	Fúria de Viver	Steve
2002–2003	Paraíso Filmes	Sabino Pascoal
2004	Senhora do Destino	Constantino
2008	No Tal Hospital	
2008	Cuidado com a Língua!	Nuno
2008–2009	Os Contemporâneos	Various Roles
2010	Bloody Night	Heitor
2011	Último a Sair	Himself
2012	Lines of Wellington	Sargent Francisco Xavier
2013	Maison close	Le Balafre
2013	Odisseia	Nuno / DJ / Empregado mesa / GNR
2013	Odysseus	Amphynome
2016	Terapia	Alexandre Gomes
2016–2017	Mata Hari	Maximilian Ridoh
2017–2018	País Irmão	Capote Raposo
2018	Sara	João Nunes
2019	Les petits meurtres d'Agatha Christie	Maxime Beaumont
2019	South	Inspector Rebelo
2020	White Lines	Boxer
2021	Princípio, Meio e Fim	Stone
2022	Causa Própria	Mário
2022	Operação Maré Negra	Sergio
2025	The Wheel of Time	Gaebril

== Awards and nominations ==
Year	Award	Category	Work	Result
2002	Extra Television Awards	Best Newcomer	Terra Speranza	Won
2003	Contigo! Award	Best Supporting Actor	Terra Speranza	Nominated
2006	Shooting Stars Award	—N/a	—N/a	Won
2006	Golden Globes (Portugal)	Best Actor	Alice	Won
2009	Golden Globes (Portugal)	Best Actor	Goodnight Irene	Won
2009	Golden Nymph Award	Outstanding Actor - Comedy Series	Os Contemporâneos	Nominated
2012	Golden Globes (Portugal)	Best Actor	Blood of My Blood	Nominated
2013	Golden Globes (Portugal)	Best Actor	Lines of Wellington	Won
2015	Golden Globes (Portugal)	Best Actor	Obsessive Rhythms	Nominated
2016	International Film Festival & Awards Macao	Best Actor	Saint George	Won
2016	Venice Orizzonti Prize	Best Actor	Saint George	Won
2017	Golden Globes (Portugal)	Best Actor	An Outpost of Progress	Won
2018	Golden Globes (Portugal)	Best Actor	Saint George	Won
2018	Áquila Awards	Best Lead Actor	Saint George	Nominated
2018	Sophia Awards	Best Actor	Saint George	Won
2019	Golden Globes (Portugal)	Theatre - Best Actor	Actors	Nominated
2021	Golden Globes (Portugal)	Best Actor - Television	White Lines	Nominated

== Alleged rape accusation ==
On 20 November 2023, American writer and filmmaker known as A.M. Lukas, real name Anna Martemucci (who directed the romantic comedy Hollidaysburg), sued Nuno Lopes in a New York court for alleged rape. According to testimony released that week, Nuno Lopes had allegedly drugged her on 28 April 2006, at an event that was part of the Tribecca Film Festival in New York, and raped her at his rented apartment before calling a taxicab for her. Lopes denied any wrongdoing and said: "My decision to refuse a confidential settlement and publicly go to court has consequences for my personal and professional reputation." and "I will never be afraid to take legal action against anyone who tries to defame my good name."
