= Joana Solnado =

Portuguese actress

- Born: 21 September 1983 (age 43); Lisbon, Portugal

Joana Solnado (born 21 September 1983) is a Portuguese actress.

== Biography ==
Born in Lisbon, Joana Sonado is the granddaughter of actor Raul Solnado and the daughter of writer Alexandra Solnado. She studied Communications in the Lusófona University, and graduated in theater with Brazilian actor Thiago Justino and studied acting at the now defunct Moderna University.

== Career ==
She participated in theater projects such as "Confissões de Adolescente" (Teenagers's Confessions) in 2002 and "Olha quem está aí para o Natal" (Look Who Is Here For Christmas) in 2003 and in several productions directed by Thiago Justino, such as "King, I Have the Dream" presented in The Edge Festival, in England with the Gulbenkian Foundation.

She became popular after participating in several Portuguese telenovelas such as "O Último Beijo" in 2002, Morangos com Açúcar from 2003 to 2004, "Tempo de Viver" in 2006 and "Ilha dos Amores" in 2007. In Brazil, she participated in Rede Globo's telenovela "Como uma Onda" from 2004 to 2005.
