= Margarida Vila-Nova =

Portuguese actress (born 1983)

- Born: 6 June 1983 (age 41); Lisbon, Portugal
- Spouse: Ivo Ferreira (m. 2008, sep. 2018)
- Children: 2

Margarida Vila-Nova (born 6 June 1983) is a Portuguese actress.

She had her first appearances in television in the programs of Filipe La Féria for RTP (1990 - Grande Noite, 1994 - Cabaret).

She received formation in the theater with Michael Margotta (2002). In the salient theater the work with the producer António Pires, in "Death of Romeu and Julieta", based on the workmanship of Shakespeare (Teatro da Cornucópia), "For a Night" of Pedro Neschling (Clube Estefânia), among other actors and actresses.

She was directed by Maria Emília Correia in "Sete Dias" of Simão Labrosse de Carole Frétechette.

She married Portuguese filmmaker Ivo Ferreira in 2008. Together they had two sons: Martim (born 28 December 2008 in Lisbon) and Dinis (born January 2012 in Macau). She also has a stepson, Francisco (born 1996), Ferreira’s son from a previous relationship. They separated in November 2018, after 10 years of marriage.

== Television ==
Series and soap operas:

- Filipa Coutinho in "Sentimentos", TVI 2009
- Maria in "A Outra", TVI 2008
- Maria Laurinda/Laura in "Tempo de Viver", TVI 2006/2007
- Rita Batalha in "Mundo Meu", TVI 2005/2006
- Raquel in "Segredo", RTP 2005
- Carolina Vilar in "Ana e os Sete", TVI 2003/2004
- Special participation in "A Minha Família é uma Animação", SIC, 2003
- Margarida Vila-Nova in "O Bairro da Fonte", SIC 2003
- Special participation, in "Filha do Mar", TVI 2002
- Bárbara Correia Marques in "Anjo Selvagem", TVI 2001/2002
- Rita Lima in "Fúria de Viver", SIC 2001
- Special participation in "Segredo de Justiça", SIC 2001
- Special participation in "Fura-Vidas", SIC 2000
- Inês in "Jornalistas", SIC 1999
- Sandra in "Amo-te Teresa"(telefilme), SIC 2000
- Cabaret RTP 1994
- Marisol in "Grande Noite", RTP, 1990

In the cinema she participated in about five headings, pointing out "O Fatalista" directed by João Botelho (2005), "O Milagre Segundo Salomé" directed by Mário Barroso (2004) and "A Imperfeição" directed by João Mário Grilo (2001). Awardee with the Honrous Mention of the Festival of Cinema of the Covilhã, in the category of Better Secondary Actress. She has exerted activity as theatrical producer.

== Films ==
- Sofia in Corrupção, 2007
- Will-o'-the-Wisp (Fogo-Fátuo) - 2022
