= Rita Blanco =

Portuguese actress (born 1963)

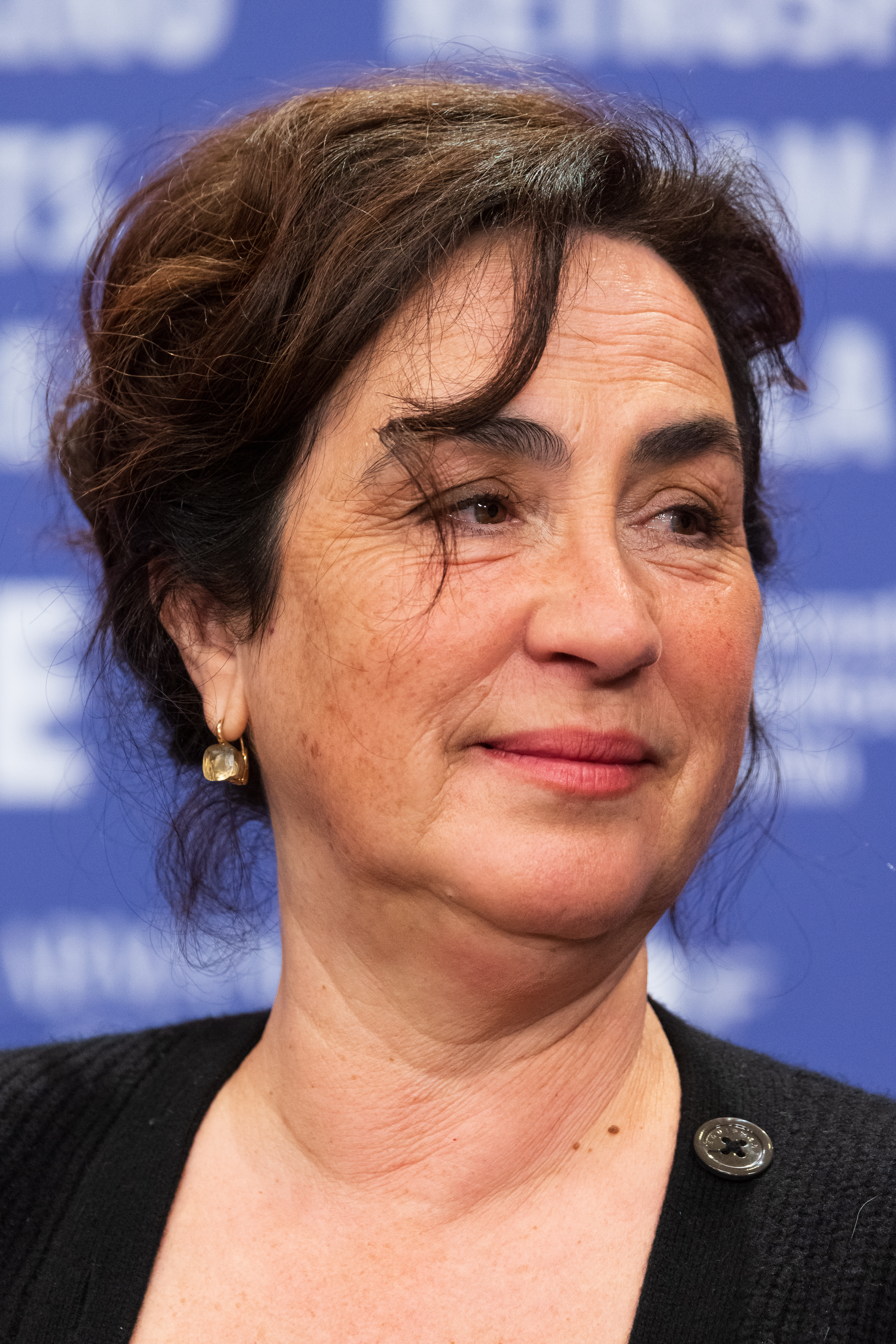
- Rita Blanco at the Berlinale in 2023
- Born: 11 January 1963 (age 62); Lisbon, Portugal
- Occupation: Actress
- Years active: 1983–present

Rita Blanco (born 11 January 1963) is a Portuguese actress. She has appeared in more than 50 films and television shows since 1983. She starred in the film Get a Life, which was screened in the Un Certain Regard section at the 2001 Cannes Film Festival.

== Selected filmography ==
=== Film ===
- Agosto (1987)
- Anxiety (1998)
- Traffic (1998)
- Get a Life (2001)
- In the Darkness of the Night (2004)
- Blood of My Blood (2011)
- Amour (2012)
- The Gilded Cage (2013)
- Bad Living (2023)
- Living Bad (2023)
- Amelia's Children (2023)

=== Television ===
- A Noite da Má Língua (1994)
- Conta-me como foi (2007–2011, 2019–2023)
- Maternidade (2011–2013)
- Odisseia (2013)
- Sol de Inverno (2013–2014)
- Coração d'Ouro (2015–2016)
- Paixão (2017–2018)
- Amor Amor (2021)
- O Pai Tirano (2022)
- Por Ti (2023)
- Flor Sem Tempo (2023)
- Marco Paulo (2023)
- Senhora do Mar (2024)

== Dubbing roles ==
=== Animated films ===
- Finding Nemo – Dory (Portuguese dub) (2003)
- Arthur and the Minimoys – Arthur's mom (Portuguese dub) (2006)
- Despicable Me 2 – Lucy Wilde (Portuguese dub) (2013)
- Finding Dory – Dory (Portuguese dub) (2016)
- Despicable Me 3 – Lucy Wilde (Portuguese dub) (2017)
