= List of Portuguese telenovelas =

This is a list of Portuguese telenovelas.

Portuguese novelas
Title	Translation	Debut	End	Channel	Notes
Ajuste de Contas	Reckoning	2000		RTP	by Francisco Nicholson
Ouro Verde	Green Gold	2017	2017	TVI	by Maria João Costa
Amanhecer	Breaking Dawn	2002	2003	TVI	Tozé Martinho and his team
Amor Maior	Greater Love	2016	2017	SIC	by Inês Gomes
Anjo Meu	My Angel	2011	2012	TVI	Maria João Mira
Anjo Selvagem	Wild Angel	2001	2003	TVI	Adaptation by Casa da Criação (Argentine original "Muñeca Brava")
Baía das Mulheres	Women Bay	2004	2005	TVI	Manuel Arouca
A Banqueira do Povo	The People's Banker	1993		RTP	by Walter Avancini
O Beijo do Escorpião	The Scorpion's Kiss	2014	2014	TVI	António Barreira and João Matos
Belmonte	Belmonte	2013	2014	TVI	Artur Ribeiro, adapted from Chilean original Hijos del Monte
Chiquititas	Little Girls	2007		SIC	adaptation of the Argentine original Chiquititas
Rainha das Flores	Queen of the Flowers	2016	2017	SIC	by Alexandre Castro
Chuva na Areia	Rain in the Sand	1985		RTP	by Luís de Sttau Monteiro
Cinzas	Ashes	1992		RTP	by Francisco Nicholson
Coração Malandro	Naughty Heart	2003	2005	TVI	adaptation by Casa da Criação (Colombian original "Pedro, El Escamoso")
Dei-te Quase Tudo	I Gave You Almost Everything	2005	2006	TVI	Casa da Criação and a novela by Tózé Martinho
Deixa-me amar	Let Me Love	2007	2008	TVI	Adaption of Argentine telenovela You Are the One (telenovela)
Desencontros	Mismatches	1994		RTP	by Nara Carvalho, Luís Filipe Costa and Francisco Moita Flores
Destinos Cruzados	Crossed Destinies	2013	2014	TVI	João Matos
Doce Fugitiva	Sweet Fugitive	2006	2007	TVI	António Barreira
Doce Tentação	Sweet Temptation	2012	2013	TVI	Sandra Santos
Doida Por Ti	Crazy About You	2012	2014	TVI	Maria João Mira
Fala-me de Amor	Talk Me on Love	2006	2006	TVI	Maria João Mira and Diogo Horta
Fascínios	Fascinations	2007	2008	TVI	António Barreira
Filha do Mar	Daughter of the Sea	2001	2002	TVI	by Manuel Arouca, Tomás Múrias and Ana Casaca
Filhos do Vento	Sons of the Wind	1996		RTP	by Francisco Moita Flores
Flor do Mar	Flower of the Sea	2008	2009	TVI	Maria João Mira
Floribella		2006	2007	SIC	adaptation from the Argentine original Floricienta
Fúria de Viver	Rage of Living	2002		SIC	Adaptation by Helena Amaral and Isabel Fraústo (Italian original "Vivere"), Endemol
Ganância	Greed	2001		SIC	by Lúcia Abreu and Francisco Nicholson
A Grande Aposta	The Great Bet	1997		RTP	by Tozé Martinho, Sara Trigoso and Cristina Aguiar
Ilha dos Amores	Love Island	2007	2007	TVI	Maria João Mira and Diogo Horta
Jardins Proibidos	Forbidden Gardens	2000	2001	TVI	by Manuel Arouca and Tomás Múrias
Jardins Proibidos (2014)	Forbidden Gardens	2014	2015	TVI	sequel of the 2000s version, by José Eduardo Moniz and Manuel Arouca
O Jogo	The Game	2003		SIC	Helena Amaral and Isabel Fraústo, Endemol
A Jóia de África	The Jewel of Africa	2002		TVI	original idea by Felícia Cabrita, written by Manuel Arouca with accessoria by Mia Couto
Jura	Swear	2006		SIC	Dot Spirit
A Lenda da Garça	The Legend of the Egret	1999		RTP	by Victor Cunha Rego and Paula Mascarenhas
Os Lobos	The Wolves	1998		RTP	by Francisco Nicholson
Louco Amor	Crazy Love	2012	2013	TVI	
Lusitana Paixão	Portuguese Passion	2002		RTP	Adaptation by Francisco Moita Flores (original by Eça de Queirós), Edipim TV/Foco
Mistura Fina	Thin Blend	2004	2005	TVI	Casa da Criação
Morangos com Açúcar	Strawberries with Sugar	2003	2012	TVI	Casa da Criação
Mulheres	Women	2014	2015	TVI	Raquel Palermo and Eduarda Laia
Mundo ao Contrário	World Upside Down	2013	2013	TVI	João Matos
Mundo Meu	My World	2005	2006	TVI	Casa da Criação
Na Paz dos Anjos	In the Angels' Peace	1994		RTP	by José Fanha and Jorge Paixão da Costa
Ninguém Como Tu	Nobody Like You	2005	2005	TVI	Rui Vilhena
Nunca Digas Adeus	Never Say Goodbye	2001	2002	TVI	adaptation by Casa da Criação (Mexican original "Mirada de Mujer")
O Olhar da Serpente	The Stare of the Snake	2002		SIC	by Felícia Cabrita, Francisco Nicholson with collaboration by Lúcia Feitosa, Vera Sacramento and Sara Rodrigues
Olhos de Água	Eyes of Water	2001	2001	TVI	by Tozé Martinho, Sarah Trigoso and Cristina Aguiar
Olhos nos Olhos	Eyes on Eyes	2008	2009	TVI	by Rui Vilhena
Origens	Origins	1983		RTP	by Nicolau Breyner and Francisco Nicholson
A Outra	The Other One	2008	2008	TVI	Tozé Martinho
O Teu Olhar	Your Stare	2003	2004	TVI	Casa da Criação
Paixões Proibidas	Forbidden Passions	2006	2007	RTP	
Palavras Cruzadas	Crosswords	1987		RTP	
Passerelle		1988		RTP	by Rosa Lobato de Faria
Primeiro Amor	First Love	1995		RTP	by Manuel Arouca and Nicolau Breyner
Queridas Feras	Dear Beasts	2003	2004	TVI	Casa da Criação
Rebelde Way	Rebel Way	2007		SIC	
Remédio Santo	Holy Remedy	2011	2012	TVI	António Barreira
Ricardina e Marta	Ricardina and Marta	1989		RTP	based on a novel by Camilo Castelo Branco
Roseira Brava	Brave Rosebush	1995		RTP	by Tozé Martinho, Sarah Trigoso and Cristina Aguiar
Saber Amar	Knowing How to Love	2003	2003	TVI	Casa da Criação and Maria João Mira
Santa Bárbara	Saint Barbara	2015	2016	TVI	Artur Ribeiro, adapted from Mexican original La Patrona
A Senhora das Águas	The Lady of the Waters	2001		RTP	by Manuel Arouca and Tomás Múrias
Sonhos Traídos	Betrayed Dreams	2002	2002	TVI	by Maria João Mira and Virgílio Castelo
Telhados de Vidro	Glass Roofs	1993	1993	TVI	by Rosa Lobato Faria
Tempo de Viver	Time to Live	2006	2007	TVI	Rui Vilhena
Terra Mãe	Motherland	1998		RTP	by Rui Vilhena
Todo o Tempo do Mundo	All the Time in the World	1999	2000	TVI	by Tozé Martinho, Sarah Trigoso and Cristina Aguiar
Tudo Por Amor	Everything for Love	2002	2003	TVI	adaptation Texto & Cena
Tu e Eu	You and I	2006	2007	TVI	Manuel Arouca and Tomás Múrias
O Último Beijo	The Last Kiss	2002	2003	TVI	adaptation by Casa da Criação
A Única Mulher	The Only Woman	2015	2016	TVI	Maria João Mira and André Ramalho
Verão Quente	Hot Summer	1993		RTP	by Manuel Arouca and Nicolau Breyner
Vidas de Sal	Salt Lives	1996		RTP	by Tozé Martinho, Sarah Trigoso and Cristina Aguiar
Vila Faia	Beech Ville	1982		RTP	by Nicolau Breyner and Francisco Nicholson
Vila Faia (2008)	Beech Ville	2008	2009	RTP	by Scriptmakers
Vingança	Revenge	2007		SIC	
