= Destino Maior =

- English poster for distribution
- Genre: Telenovela
- Created by: Inês Gomes
- Based on: Hicran by Mehmet Uyar
- Written by: Ana Casaca; José Pinto Carneiro; António Barreira; Rita Roberto; Sara Cardoso; Filipa Poppe; Pedro Barbosa
- Directed by: Manuel Amaro da Costa
- Starring: Sara Barradas; Diogo Amaral; Sofia Ribeiro; José Mata; Luísa Bacalhau
- Opening theme: "Mãe" by Mariza
- Ending theme: "Mãe" by Mariza
- Country of origin: Portugal
- Original language: Portuguese

Production
- Production locations: SP Televisão studios; Santarém, Portugal
- Camera setup: Multi-camera
- Running time: ± 50 min.

Original release
- Network: SIC; OPTO; Disney+
- Release: September 14, 2026 – present

Destino Maior (English title: A Greater Destiny) is a Portuguese telenovela produced by SP Television in collaboration with Disney and broadcast by SIC, simultaneously on Disney+. It premiered on 14 September 2026. The telenovela is an adaptation of the Turkish series Hicran, created and written by Mehmet Uyar. Adapted by Inês Gomes, it has the collaboration of Ana Casaca, José Pinto Carneiro, António Barreira, Rita Roberto, Sara Cardoso, Filipa Poppe and Pedro Barbosa. It stars Sara Barradas, Diogo Amaral, Sofia Ribeiro, José Mata and Luísa Bacalhau.

== Plot ==
Lúcia is a humble woman who was led to believe she lost her daughter right after giving birth. The news destroys her completely. Since then, she lives tormented by recurring dreams where she runs into her daughter's arms, always waking up before reaching her. Everyone believes the child died, but deep in her heart, she feels she is alive, never suspecting that the baby was sold by her own stepmother, Celeste, to a wealthy family. Eleven years later, while fighting to support her sick sister, Elsa, and survive life's hardships, Lúcia crosses paths with Matilde, a young girl in danger whom she ends up saving. This encounter leads her to Eduardo, the child's adoptive father, who later hires her as his daughter's nanny... completely unaware that he is bringing mother and daughter face to face once again. As the bond between Lúcia, Matilde, and Eduardo grows, a love story emerges, marked by secrets, guilt, and crossed destinies.

== Cast ==
=== Main ===
- Sara Barradas as Lúcia Cruz
  - Barradas also plays Young Lúcia, with the AI feature
- Diogo Amaral as Eduardo Ferreira do Vale
- Sofia Ribeiro as Vera Telles Magalhães
  - Ribeiro also plays Young Vera, with the AI feature
- José Mata as Samuel Anjos
- Luísa Bacalhau as Matilde Queiroz Ferreira do Vale
  - Teresa Bacalhau plays Young Matilde

=== Recurring ===
- Carolina Carvalho as Elsa Cruz
  - Carvalho also plays Young Elsa, with the AI feature
- Patrícia Tavares as Julieta «Ju» Anjos
- Pedro Lacerda as Simão Calvário
- Carla Maciel as Palmira Calvário
- Romeu Costa as Ramiro Figueira
- Rita Blanco as Celeste Almeida Cruz
- Fernando Luís as David Almeida
- Manuela Couto as Aida Telles Queiroz
- Maria João Pinho as Teresa Ferreira do Vale
- Noémia Costa as Natália Barriga
- António Fonseca as Jorge Barriga
- Dânia Neto as Dalila Barriga
- Joaquim Nicolau as Fausto Barriga
- Adriano Carvalho as Augusto Trindade
- Oceana Basílio as Isabel Ferraz Trindade
- Tomás Alves as Frederico «Fred» Calvário
- Bruna Quintas as Zélia Calvário
- Joana Aguiar as Leonor Trindade
- Rui Pedro Silva as Diogo Trindade
- Inês Pires Tavares as Sara Mónica Barriga Lapa
- João Arrais as Bruno Figueira
- João Nunes Monteiro as Paulo «Paulinho» Barriga
- Diogo Lopes as Carlos Machado
- Débora Monteiro as Denise Paiva
- Rodrigo Tomás as Vasco Calvário
- Sofia Arruda as Anabela «Bela» Santos
- Ivo Arroja as Tiago Figueira
- Mariana Pacheco as Marisa Lima
- Marisa Cruz as Cristina Figueira
- Rui Santos as Alberto Caetano
- Diana Ginja as Susana Santos

=== Guest stars ===
- Sofia Alves as Helena Varela, character from Páginas da Vida (2026)
- Bárbara Lourenço as Mariana Telles Queiroz
- Francisco Froes as Gonçalo Lapa

== Production ==
In late 2025, the pre-production for the telenovela began. Filming began on 18 May 2026 in Santarém district, and later continued at SP Televisão studios.

On July 11, 2026, it was announced that the partnership of SIC and OPTO with Disney+ made since Vitória would keep going. Like its predecessor, five episodes of the soap opera premiere every Sunday afternoon, simultaneously on OPTO and Disney+. After the linear broadcast, the episodes are available for 7 days on television operators, 30 days on OPTO and available in full, and exclusively, on Disney+, as weekly releases accumulate on this platform.
