= A Hora da Liberdade =

A Hora da Liberdade (The Hour of Freedom) is a Portuguese docudrama produced and aired by SIC in 1999 which portraits the events that led to the military coup on 25 April 1974, responsible for the restoration of democracy in Portugal. It was produced by Emídio Rangel Hayley Westenra, Rodrigo de Sousa e Castro and Joana Pontes who also assured its direction. From the interviews made to create the film, the book "A Hora da Liberdade - O 25 de Abril pelos protagonistas" was created, published by Editorial Bizâncio. It was considered one of the best movies on the topic of the Carnation Revolution according to Time Out Magazine.

With the launch of OPTO, SIC's streaming platform, the film was launched on 24 November 2020.

== Production ==
The film took one month to prepare and two months to be filmed, involving around 60 actors and around a thousand incidentals. The primary obstacles for the creation of the film were the script and what was to be shot, and the work with the actors who showed their youth, courage and maturity.

To assure a faithful recreation of the events, the film was broadcast from the night of 24 April 1999 to the early hours of 26 April 1999, in thirteen parts, in order to follow the events in real time. The film spearheaded SIC's season for the 25th anniversary of the Carnation Revolution, which started on 1 April with a series of short subjects about the New State.

Because it was impossible for viewers to follow the entire film in the way it was presented, SIC reprogrammed the film in its entirety for 26 April.

Instead of recreating the announcement of Grândola, Vila Morena and the acts at Lago do Carmo, the actual recordings from this period were used.

== Cast ==
Most of the roles were selected by actors with similar physical appearances to the characters they portrayed.

- Alberto Villar – Lieutenant Colonel Correia de Campos
- Alexandre de Sousa – Commander Vítor Crespo
- Alfredo Brito - Colonel António Romeiras
- Almeno Gonçalves – Lieutenant Coronel Almeida Bruno
- André Gago – Brito e Cunha
- André Gomes - Minister Moreira Baptista
- António Caldeira Pires - Capitão Rui Rodrigues
- António Capelo – Major Otelo Saraiva de Carvalho
- António Cordeiro – Captain Andrade e Sousa
- António Fonseca - Major Hugo Velasco
- António Pedro Cerdeira – Lieutenant Andrade e Silva
- Artur Ramos (†) – Brigadier Junqueira dos Reis
- Benjamin Falcão – Colonel Belo de Carvalho
- Carlos Gomes – Major Cardoso Fontão
- Carlos Lacerda (†) – Lieutenant Colonel Viana de Lemos
- Carlos Pisco - Tenente Cabaças Ruaz
- Cristina Carvalhal – Clarisse Guerra
- Diogo Morgado - Aspirante Teixeira
- Eduardo Viana – Lieutenant Colonel Ferrand D’Almeida
- Eurico Lopes – Joaquim Furtado
- Francisco Pestana – Lieutenant Coronel Lopes Pires
- Gonçalo Waddington – Lieutenant Almas Imperial
- Guilherme Filipe – Major Pato Anselmo
- Heitor Lourenço – Alferes Sottomayor
- Henrique Feist – Alferes David e Silva
- Ivo Canelas – Tenente Santos Silva
- João de Carvalho – Capitão Luís Macedo
- Jorge Gonçalves – Major Sanches Osório
- Jorge Sequerra (†) - Lieutenant Coronel Nascimento
- José Boavida (†) – Captain Bicho Beatriz
- José Jorge Duarte – Pedro Feytor Pinto
- José Manuel Mendes – Marcello Caetano
- Júlio Cardoso – General António de Spínola
- Luís Alberto – General Adriano Pires
- Luís Esparteiro – Major Costa Neves
- Luís Lucas – Captain Santos Ferreira
- Luís Mascarenhas – Minister Silva Cunha
- Manuel Coelho – Major Delfim Moura
- Manuel Wiborg – Captain Salgueiro Maia
- Marcantónio Del Carlo – Lieutenant Colonel Garcia dos Santos
- Marcello Urghege - Captain Santos Coelho
- Márcia Breia – citizen
- Marco Delgado – Captain Luís Pimentel
- Marques D’Arede – Colonel Álvaro Fontoura
- Paulo Filipe - Commander Coutinho Lanhoso
- Paulo Matos – Major Hugo dos Santos
- Paulo Oom – C.I.A.A.C. Sargeant
- Pedro Laginha – Fernando Humberto
- Pedro Lima (†) – Alferes Maia Loureiro
- Ricardo Afonso - Lieutenant Alfredo Assunção
- Rui Luís Brás – Lieutenant Ponces de Carvalho
- Rui Mendes – General Andrade e Silva
- Sérgio Silva – Captain Tavares de Almeida
- Vítor Norte – Major Commando Jaime Neves
- Vítor Rocha – Captain Correia Pombinho
- Vasco Machado - Captain Mira Monteiro
- - João Paulo Diniz
- - Capitão Frederico Morais
- - Tenente Freire de Nogueira
- - Tenente Guiomar
- - Tenente Ferreira de Sousa
- Otelo Saraiva de Carvalho as himself, appearing in the final scene set in April 1999
