= Sangue Oculto =

- English poster for distribution
- Genre: Telenovela
- Created by: Sandra Santos
- Written by: Pedro Barbosa da Silva; Andreia Vicente Martins; Joana Andrade; Manuel Mora Marques; Pedro Cavaleiro; Sara Cardoso
- Directed by: Jorge Cardoso
- Starring: Sara Matos; Sofia Alves; Luana Piovani; João Catarré; António Pedro Cerdeira; Maria João Pinho; Marcantónio Del Carlo; Mariana Pacheco; Cristóvão Campos
- Opening theme: "Sangue Oculto" by GNR
- Ending theme: "Sangue Oculto" by GNR
- Country of origin: Portugal
- Original language: Portuguese
- No. of seasons: 1 (2 parts)
- No. of episodes: 283

Production
- Production locations: SP Televisão studios; Almada; Costa da Caparica
- Camera setup: Multi-camera
- Running time: ± 50 min.

Original release
- Network: SIC
- Release: 19 September 2022 – October 13, 2023

Sangue Oculto (English title: The Secret) is a Portuguese telenovela produced by SP Televisão and broadcast by SIC. It premiered on 19 September 2022. The telenovela is written by Sandra Santos with the collaboration of Pedro Barbosa da Silva, Andreia Vicente Martins, Joana Andrade, Manuel Mora Marques, Pedro Cavaleiro and Sara Cardoso. It stars Sara Matos, Sofia Alves, Luana Piovani, João Catarré, António Pedro Cerdeira, Maria João Pinho, Marcantónio Del Carlo, Mariana Pacheco and Cristóvão Campos.

== Plot ==
Thirty years ago, Vanda found out that Teresa, a housekeeper working at her home, was pregnant of twins from her own husband Olavo. While he was on a diplomatic mission abroad, Vanda seizes the opportunity to make Teresa hide her pregnancy by promising to help her with money, all the while planning for a way to getting rid of her. With no way to contact Olavo, Teresa is forced to comply with Vanda, oblivious to the fact that she intends to take advantage of her pregnancy for herself, as her inability to bear children is one of the reasons for her marriage being strained. On the day of the birth, Vanda dupes Teresa and takes her to an inactive delivery room at the hospital where she works as a doctor and, with the help of a colleague, drugs Teresa in order to do what she needs. Vanda's plan is to keep one of the children, whom she’ll raise as her own, and sell the other one to a couple abroad. Teresa wakes up from labour and, believing that her first daughter is stillborn, manages to escape from the hospital before Vanda manages to steal her other child, Carolina. Knowing that her boss won’t let go, Teresa decides to flee the country. Meanwhile, Vanda presents the twin, Benedita to her husband, telling him that she was abandoned by her mother and that she wants to adopt her. Olavo is enamoured by the baby, oblivious to the fact that she actually is his own biological daughter.

== Cast ==
- Sara Matos as Carolina Batista, Benedita Corte Real and Júlia Pereira de Mello
  - TBA as Young Carolina and Young Júlia
- Sofia Alves as Teresa Batista
  - Laura Dutra as Young Teresa
- Luana Piovani as Vanda Corte Real
  - Vitória Frate as Young Vanda
- João Catarré as Tiago Carvalho
- António Pedro Cerdeira as Olavo Corte Real
  - João Gadelha as Young Olavo
- Maria João Pinho as Carmo Pereira de Mello
- Marcantonio Del Carlo as João Pereira de Mello
- Mariana Pacheco as Patrícia Pereira de Mello
  - TBA as Young Patrícia
- Cristóvão Campos as Pedro Brito
- Soraia Chaves as Lídia Rocha
- Renato Godinho as Guilherme Mesquita
- Anabela Moreira as Sílvia Apolinário
- Sérgio Praia as António Jorge "Tojó" Rocha
- Manuela Couto as Remédios Brito
- Luís Alberto as Tadeu Batista
  - Jorge Silva as Young Tadeu
- Lia Gama as Noémia Batista
  - Margarida Bento as Young Noémia
- Carlos Cunha as Joaquim Agostinho
- Júlia Palha as Maria Pacheco
- João Jesus as Nelson Apolinário
- Carla Andrino as Fernanda "Naná" Pacheco
- Pedro Laginha as César Apolinário
- Ana Marta Ferreira as Bárbara Barreto
- Rui Unas as Fábio Lucas
- Melânia Gomes as Rosa Silva
- Filipe Matos as Mário Apolinário
- Guilherme Moura as Vasyl Kovalenko
- Inês Pires Tavares as Elsa Rocha
- Tiago Aldeia as Henrique Serôdio
- Sérgio Praia as António Jorge "Tojo" Rocha
- Maria Marques as Anna Batista
- Ricardo Lopes as Bruno Rocha

=== Guest stars ===
- Adriano Luz as Alberto Mesquita
  - Sisley Dias as Young Alberto
- Virgílio Castelo as Almeno Carvalho
- Xana Abreu as Becky Agostinho

== Production ==
In August 2021, the pre-production for the telenovela began. Almost a year later, the first scenes began to be filmed in Almada, in Costa da Caparica, with the rest of the cast in the same month, respectively on the 15 July 2022, and also later in SP Televisão studios. Also, in November 2022 there were as well recordings in Meco, that places in the history as a desolate field in Ibiza for cost containment; and in January 2023 in Proença-a-Nova. The recordings should end in January 2023, but were postponed to March due to the interruptions of the recordings of Lia Gama and Sofia Alves for health reasons in Q4 2022. The last scenes of Luana Piovani and Marcantónio Del Carlo were filmed on 30 January 2023 and Sara Matos on 2 March. The remaining cast finished the work on March 15.

== Ratings ==
Parts	Episodes	First aired		Last aired		Avg. viewers (points)
Parts	Episodes	Date	Viewers (points)	Date	Viewers (points)	Avg. viewers (points)
1	64	September 19, 2022	10.1	December 13, 2022	8.5	TBD
2	219	December 14, 2022	9.2	October 13, 2023	7.1	TBD

Premiering with the purpose of raising the audiences left of its predecessors in the time slot (Amor Amor - Vol. 2 and Por Ti) saw one of the worst pilot-episode rating of the first track of telenovelas broadcast by SIC, drawing a rating of 10.1 points and audience share of 20.8%.

Since the second episode, the telenovela showed some leadship in the audiences, although not be every day. The last episode sawed the vice-leadership of the audiences, drawing a rating of 7.1 points and audience share of 15.0%.
