= Quercus (organization) =

- Founded: 1985
- Type: Environmental organization

Quercus - Associação Nacional de Conservação da Natureza (Quercus - National Association for Nature Conservation) is a Portuguese environmental organization founded in 1985. The name Quercus is used because the Oak (Quercus in Latin) is one of the species that is characteristic in this country and that nowadays is increasingly rare. Its headquarters are in the Monsanto Forest Park, in Lisbon.

On their website, Quercus declares itself to be a non-profit national environment organization, independent from political parties.

== Mission statement ==
Quercus is a Portuguese organization, but it has concerns about the environment outside Portugal as well. A recent initiative, Earth Condominium alerts for the need of a global management of some earth resources like the water or the air. Most of its action is in Portugal, where this organization acts by creating awareness about the environment problems that this country faces, and by presenting more environmentally friendly options. Quercus also acts formally by complaining in Portuguese and European courts about allegedly unlawful actions against the environment.

== Priorities and campaigns ==
GM - Quercus is against the use and production of genetically modified food, for human and animal consumption. It is a member of Plataforma Trangénicos Fora do Prato, a Portuguese Organization that defends a GM free agriculture.

Nuclear - Quercus is against the use of nuclear technology to produce energy, it has participated in the campaign One Million Europeans against Nuclear Power, and is affiliated with Plataforma Não ao Nuclear.

Waste - The organization has campaigned for a reduction and correct processing of different kinds of waste in Portugal.

Water - The organization has campaigned to create awareness about the challenges of water quality and quantity management in the planet. Recently it has announced the Earth-Condominium concept.

== Membership ==
Anyone who share the Quercus environmental goals can apply for a membership. This can be done online or by contacting any of the local groups. Prices go from €8 to €20 (yearly) for individual membership and €45 for organizations.

== Structure ==
The organization works under a democratic model. Leaders are elected under national and local elections, which take place every year or every two years. Decisions are also voted if a consensus is not possible.

The Quercus headquarters is located in Lisbon, Portugal, but there are other structures and projects located outside Lisbon.

Local groups are called Núcleos. Quercus has 20 local groups in almost every region in Portugal.

Projects are other type of structures that have very specific objectives. For example Ecocasa gives information about environment friendly houses, and 3 animal hospitals take care of wounded wild animals.

== Communication ==
On television, Quercus has a regular one-minute show, giving advice on how anyone can contribute to a better environment. Some of the organization messages and campaigns are usually noticed on TV, specially if they speak about a current newsworthy issue like the plans to build a new airport in Lisbon.

The official website, www.quercus.pt, is the main means of communication for the organization.

Other local structures such as Porto also have their independent websites. Other projects in which Quercus is involved like Ecocasa., Earth Condominium and Topten also have their independent websites.

On 5 June 2007, Quercus has announced Quercus TV, a web TV for environmental issues. The organization plans to post videos from their activities and other videos about the environment.

In terms of Social Media, Quercus has an active Facebook page Quercus - ANCN used to promote activities and articles, but where the organization not only does not often engage in active discussion, but also prevents opposing views from being discussed by banning users who do not conform to their views, which is done in violation of their own regulatory principles.

== Team Building Activities ==
In order to compensate companies' carbon footprints, Quercus hosts company team buildings in their delegated areas such as Mata da Machada in Barreiro, Serra de Sintra in Cascais, or Pinhal de Leiria in Leiria. These activities consist mainly of planting native trees and shrubs, as well as removing invasive species. Some of the most well-known companies cooperating with Quercus are Portuguese's post CTT, C&A, KUBOO Self-Storage, Palmolive, Caixa Geral de Depósitos, and Generali Tranquilidade.
