= A Espia =

Portuguese television series

- Genre: Historical drama; Spy thriller
- Created by: Pandora da Cunha Telles
- Developed by: José de Pina; Rui Cardoso Martins
- Directed by: Jorge Paixão da Costa; Edgar Pêra; João Maia
- Starring: Daniela Ruah; Diogo Morgado; Maria João Bastos; António Capelo; Luís Eusébio; Adriano Carvalho; Marco D'Almeida; Pedro Lamares; Sisley Dias; Patrícia Tavares; Adriano Luz; Joaquim Nicolau
- Countries of origin: Portugal; Spain
- Original languages: Portuguese; English; German
- No. of seasons: 1
- No. of episodes: 8

Production
- Production companies: Ukbar Filmes; RTP; Ficción Producciones

Original release
- Network: RTP1
- Release: 8 April – 27 May 2020

A Espia (transl. 'The Spy') is a Portuguese historical drama television miniseries starring Daniela Ruah, Diogo Morgado and Maria João Bastos. It originally aired in 2020 on RTP1.

== Premise ==
The fiction, taking place in between Lisbon, Porto and Galicia, starts in 1941, during World War II. It tracks the maze of espionage in 1940s Portugal by focusing on the Shell network, dealing with developments such as the provision of tungsten (a critical mineral in war time).

== Cast ==
- Daniela Ruah as Maria João Mascarenhas.
- Diogo Morgado as Siegfried Brenner.
- Maria João Bastos as Rose Lawson.
- António Capelo as Nicolau Mascarenhas.
- Luís Eusébio as Agent Paulo Santos.
- Adriano Carvalho as William Larenz.
- Marco D'Almeida as Richard Thompson.
- Pedro Lamares as Major Jack Beevor.
- Sisley Dias as Cândido de Oliveira.
- Patrícia Tavares as Alice.
- Adriano Luz as Agostinho Lourenço.
- Joaquim Nicolau as Captain Ribeiro Casais.

== Production and release ==
Produced by Ukbar Filmes together with RTP, Ficción Producciones and with the support from ICA and PIC Portugal, it is a joint co-production by Portugal and Spain. Developed by José de Pina and Rui Cardoso Martins based on an original idea from Pandora da Cunha Telles, the writing team was formed by Raquel Palermo, Cláudia Clemente, Martim Baginha, Snir Wein, Pablo Iraola, Pandora da Cunha Telles, Rui Cardoso Martins and José de Pina.

Consisting of 8 episodes, shooting took place from May to July 2019 in Lisbon, Porto, Curia, Tomar, Figueira da Foz and Santiago de Compostela.

Directors included Jorge Paixão da Costa, Edgar Pêra and João Maia. Historian Margarida de Magalhães Ramalho worked as historical advisor.

Series	Episodes	Originally released			Ref.
Series	Episodes	First released	Last released	Network	Ref.
1	8	8 April 2020	27 May 2020	RTP1	

== Awards and nominations ==
Year	Award	Category	Nominee(s)	Result	Ref.
2021	10th Sophia Awards	Best Series or TV Movie		Nominated	
