= António Pedro Cerdeira =

- Born: António Pedro dos Santos Cerdeira; June 1, 1970 (age 56); Monte Estoril, Cascais, Portugal
- Occupation: Actor
- Years active: 1995–present
- Spouse: Rita Guerra (m. 2011; div. 2013)
- Children: 2

António Pedro dos Santos Cerdeira (born Cascais, June 1, 1970) is a Portuguese actor.

== Career ==
He studied acting at the Professional Theatre School and interned, under the direction of Carlos Avilez, at the Cascais Experimental Theatre, where he was part of the cast of the plays O Pranto e As Almas and Breve Sumário da História de Deus by Gil Vicente, A Morte de Danton by Büchner, Auto Das Regateiras by Ribeiro Chiado, Rei Lear by Shakespeare, Rei Leandro by Alice Vieira, Lua Desconhecida by Miguel Rovisco, Ensina-me a Viver by Colin Higgins, Alta Vigilância and Os Biombos by Jean Genet.

At the Teatro Nacional D. Maria II, she participated in Agustina Bessa-Luís's As Fúrias, directed by Filipe La Féria, and at the Gulbenkian Foundation, she was one of the performers in O Amor em Visita – Poesia Portuguesa das Últimas Três Décadas, a poetry performance directed by Gastão Cruz. She worked with Luís Miguel Cintra at the Teatro da Cornucópia, participating in Pasolini's A Fabulação, and with Jorge Silva Melo at Artistas Unidos, participating in Brecht's A Queda do Egoísta Johan Fatzer (1999). She also performed in O Método Grönholm by the Catalan author Jordi Galcerán (2005), directed by Virgílio Castelo, Relativamente by Alan Aykbourn (2010) directed by João Lagarto, and Hedda by José Maria Vieira Mendes, based on the work of Ibsen (2010) directed by Jorge Silva Melo.

== Filmography ==
=== Television ===
| Year | Project | Role | Notes | Channel |
|---|---|---|---|---|
| 1995 | Roseira Brava | Eduardo Falcão | Main Cast | RTP1 |
| 1995 - 1996 | Primeiro Amor | Mário Cruz | Main Cast | RTP1 |
| 1996 | A Mulher do Senhor Ministro | Nelo Monteiro | Guest Actor | RTP1 |
| 1996 - 1997 | Polícias | Raul | Main Cast | RTP1 |
| 1997 | Filhos do Vento | Carlos Vieira | Main Cast | RTP1 |
| 1997 – 1998 | A Grande Aposta | Simão das Neves | Main Cast | RTP1 |
| 1998 | Ballet Rose | Gaspar | Special Participation | RTP1 |
| 1998 | Diário de Maria | | Special Participation | RTP1 |
| 1998 – 1999 | Os Lobos | Rui | Main Cast | RTP1 |
| 1998 – 1999 | Os Lobos | Ricardo Pinto Lobo | Main Cast | RTP1 |
| 1999 | Médico de Família | | Small Participation | SIC |
| 1999 | Jornalistas | Vasco Neves | Small Participation | SIC |
| 1999 | A Hora da Liberdade | Lieutenant Andrade e Silva | Main Cast | SIC |
| 1999 – 2000 | Esquadra de Polícia | Osvaldo | Main Cast | RTP1 |
| 2000 | A Febre do Ouro Negro | Eduardo Covas | Main Cast | RTP1 |
| 2000 – 2001 | Ajuste de Contas | Bruno Reis | Main Cast | RTP1 |
| 2001 | Elsa, Uma Mulher Assim | Horácio | Small Participation | RTP1 |
| 2001 | Olhos de Água | Duarte Leal | Protagonist | TVI |
| 2001 - 2003 | Anjo Selvagem | Francisco Salgado | Antagonist | TVI |
| 2003 | O Teu Olhar | Miguel Fonseca | Protagonist | TVI |
| 2003 – 2005 | Ana e os Sete | Tino Boavida | Protagonist | TVI |
| 2004 – 2005 | Inspetor Max | Alexandre "Alex" | Special Participation | TVI |
| 2005 | Ninguém como Tu | Frederico Duarte | Main Cast | TVI |
| 2006 – 2007 | Tu e Eu | Alexandre Antunes | Antagonist | TVI |
| 2007 - 2008 | Deixa-me Amar | Carlos Peixoto | Co-Protagonist | TVI |
| 2008 | Casos da Vida | Pedro | Small Participation | TVI |
| 2008 – 2009 | Feitiço de Amor | Eduardo Rocha | Main Cast | TVI |
| 2009 – 2010 | Ele É Ela | Sérgio | Antagonist | TVI |
| 2009 – 2010 | Meu Amor | Leonardo Correia | Antagonist | TVI |
| 2011 – 2012 | Anjo Meu | Sílvio Saragoça | Antagonist | TVI |
| 2013 | Portal do Tempo | Gustavo Menezes Falcão | Antagonist | TVI |
| 2013 – 2014 | Destinos Cruzados | Luciano Mendes | Co-Protagonist | TVI |
| 2014 – 2015 | Bem-Vindos a Beirais | Vasco Nogueira | Main Cast | RTP1 |
| 2015 | Coração d'Ouro | Abel Pedrosa | Special Participation | SIC |
| 2016 – 2017 | A Impostora | Paulo de Jesus Pires | Main Cast | TVI |
| 2016 – 2017 | Mulheres Assim | José "Zé" Carlos | Protagonist | RTP1 |
| 2017 | A Família Ventura | Luís | Protagonist | RTP1 |
| 2017 | Jacinta | Manuel Marto | Protagonist | TVI |
| 2017 | Rainha das Flores | Leonardo | Additional Cast | SIC |
| 2017 – 2018 | Paixão | Henrique Ribeiro | Main Cast | SIC |
| 2018 | Onde Está Elisa? | Rui Menezes | Protagonist | TVI |
| 2019 | Alguém Perdeu | Rodrigo Sarmento | Protagonist | CMTV |
| 2019 | Teorias da Conspiração | Melo | Additional Cast | RTP1 |
| 2020 | Conta-me como Foi | Salvador | Special Participation | RTP1 |
| 2020 | O Atentado | Agostinho Lourenço | Main Cast | RTP1 |
| 2020 | Nazaré | Nuno Saavedra | Main Cast | SIC |
| 2021 – 2022 | A Serra | Fernando Pereira Espinho | Co-Protagonist | SIC |
| 2022 – 2023 | Sangue Oculto | Olavo Corte Real | Protagonist | SIC |
| 2024 | Hell's Kitchen - Famosos | Himself | Competitor; Season 2 | SIC |
| 2025 | A Herança | Otávio Martins | Main Cast | SIC |

=== Cinema ===
| Year | Title | Role | Directed by | Notes |
|---|---|---|---|---|
| 1998 | Azert | Rogério | Sérgio Baptista | Short film |
| 1998 | The Mutants | Disco Doorman | Teresa Villaverde | |
| 1999 | António, Um Rapaz de Lisboa | Art Student | Jorge Silva Melo | |
| 2001 | Camarate | Pilot | Luís Filipe Rocha | |
| 2002 | Der Gläserne Blick | Fernando | Markus Heltschl | |
| 2006 | Pele | Macedo | Fernando Vendrell | |
| 2006 | Sitiados | Rafael | Mariana Gaivão | Short film |
| 2007 | O Mistério da Estrada de Sintra | Ramalho Ortigão | Jorge Paixão da Costa | |
| 2007 | Corrupção | Inspector Luís | João Botelho | |
| 2008 | A Corte do Norte | Lopo | João Botelho | |
| 2008 | Amália - O Filme | Ricardo Espírito Santo | Carlos Coelho da Silva | |
| 2009 | Assalto ao Santa Maria | Mortágua | Francisco Manso | |
| 2010 | O Inimigo Sem Rosto | Boy | José Farinha | |
| 2010 | Filme do Desassossego | Man in green tie | João Botelho | |
| 2010 | A Cabine | | Paulo Neves | Short film |
| 2013 | Onde Está a Tia? | João Carlos | Nicolau Breyner | Short film |
| 2014 | Sei Lá | Francisco | Joaquim Leitão | |
| 2015 | A Estreia | | Reza Hajipour | Short film |
| 2017 | Jacinta | Manuel Marto | Jorge Paixão da Costa | |
| 2018 | Soldado Milhões | Ferreira do Amaral | Jorge Paixão da Costa and Gonçalo Galvão Teles | |

== Streaming ==
| Year | Project | Role | Notes | Channel |
|---|---|---|---|---|
| 2019 | Vagabond | Michael | Special Participation | Netflix |
| 2021 - 2022 | A Lista | Ricardo Silva Pereira | Special Participation | OPTO |
| 2023 | Marco Paulo | António "Toni" Coelho | Recurring Cast | OPTO |

== Awards ==
TV 7 Dias/Impala Television Trophies

| Year | Award | Work | Result |
|---|---|---|---|
| 2020 | Melhor Ator de Série | Onde Está Elisa? | Won |
