= A Serra =

Portuguese telenovela

- English poster for distribution
- Starring: Júlia Palha; Sofia Alves; José Mata; Carolina Carvalho
- Country of origin: Portugal
- Original language: Portuguese
- No. of episodes: 303

Original release
- Network: SIC
- Release: February 22, 2021 – April 29, 2022

A Serra (Star Hill) is a Portuguese telenovela which began airing on SIC on 22 February 2021 and ended on 29 April 2022. It also aired on CFMT-DT in Canada.

== Plot ==
Love moves mountains...

When Fátima – a young woman from Serra da Estrela – meets Tomás – the son of a burel factory’s owners – the connection between them is undeniable. However, Tomás is engaged to the girl who has been her rival since they were teenagers – Mariana – and is being blackmailed to stay away from Fátima because of her brother’s (Artur) death.

Devastated by the loss of Artur and her father’s imprisonment, Fátima wants justice, and she will find it, even if she has to go against the most powerful family in Serra. Yet, she will bump into a terrible secret that involves not only the whole village she lives in, but also Carlota, Mariana’s mother, who is going to do everything so that truth never comes out.

Star Hill is a rural telenovela set in the mountains, in a remote village from Serra da Estrela, Portugal, where everyone knows each other. Remoteness and the hard life they have makes them feel part of a community. Most people in the village work and depend somehow on Pereira de Espinho’s family business, who run the most famous hotel in the mountain and are also Mariana’s parents, the antagonist. Fátima will cross path with Carlota, a powerful and dishonest woman, who has everything to lose. Star Hill is a narrative framed by mystery, where two women that could not be more different, fight for the love of one man.

== Cast ==
Actor/Actress	Characters
Júlia Palha	Fátima Roque Neto
Sofia Alves	Carlota Pereira Espinho
José Mata	Tomás Folgado
Carolina Carvalho	Mariana Pereira Espinho
António Pedro Cerdeira	Fernando Pereira Espinho
Pedro Laginha	Silvério Neto
Margarida Serrano	Anabela Neto
Dânia Neto	Paula Neto
João Jesus	Gustavo Folgado
Custódia Gallego	Aida Folgado
João de Carvalho	Moisés Folgado
Maria João Abreu	Conceição «Sãozinha» Grilo
Ana Marta Ferreira	Jacinta Grilo
Laura Dutra	Margarida «Guida» Grilo
António Camelier	António José «Tozé» Grilo
Isabela Valadeiro	Vitória Castro
Soraia Chaves	Rosalinda Roque Nunes
Jorge Corrula	Domingos Nunes
Manuela Couto	Maria do Carmo «Carminho» Teles de Arriaga
Fernando Luís	Manuel Teles de Arriaga
Tiago Teotónio Pereira	Salvador Teles de Arriaga
Carla Andrino	Elvira Roque Courela
Oceana Basílio	Ivone Roque Courela
João Mota	Nicolau Roque Courela
João Maneira	Fausto Roque Courela
Virgílio Castelo	Sebastião Botelho
Vítor Silva Costa	Guilherme Botelho
Ana Lopes	Marta Botelho
Márcia Breia	Hortense Rasteiro
Cristina Homem de Mello	Helena «Lena» Rasteiro
Maria Eduarda Laranjeira	Leonor Barroso
José Eduardo	Augusto Pereira Espinho
Francisco Arraiol	—N/a

=== Guest cast ===
Actor/Actress	Characters
Ângelo Rodrigues	Artur Neto
