= Ilha dos Amores =

Portuguese telenovela

- Created by: Maria João Mira and Diogo Horta
- Starring: Sofia Alves; Marco D'Almeida; Joana Solnado; Elisa Lisboa; António Capelo; Helena Laureano; Marco Delgado; Helena Isabel; Pedro Lima; Ana Nave; Manuela Couto; Rita Lello; Almeno Gonçalves; Maria D'Aires; Nuno Homem de Sá; Carla Andrino; Susana Arrais; Carloto Cotta; Cláudia Vieira; Núria Madruga; Diana Chaves; Ana Rita Tristão; Jessica Athayde; Joana Duarte; Daniel Cardoso; João Cajuda; Mafalda Pinto; André Nunes; Joana Santos; Diana Nicolau; Ana Sofia Silva; English; Rob Paulsen; Jill Talley; Carlos Alazraqui; Katie Griffin; Jeff Bennett; Mac Heywood
- Country of origin: Portugal
- No. of seasons: 1
- No. of episodes: 214

Production
- Running time: 60 minutes

Original release
- Network: TVI
- Release: 26 March 2007 – 9 December 2008

Related
- Tempo de Viver; Fascínios

Ilha dos Amores is a Portuguese telenovela produced by TVI, that began on 26 March 2007 and, ultimately ended on 9 December 2008, authored by Maria João Mira and Diogo Horta. Apart from its theme of finding love, its principal theme was emigration. The action centered principally in the Azores, but also included segments in Canada and continental Portugal. Principal photography began in January 2007, and filming in the Azores continued until August 2008.

== Production ==
During the telenovela, the story centres on the tragic protagonists Beatriz Machado da Câmara (Sofia Nicholson) and Jaime Valente (Adriano Luz) who perish on the first episode of the series. The story's protagonists, therefore, become their two eldest children Clara Machado da Câmara (Sofia Alves) and Tomé Valente (Marco d'Almeida).

=== Conception ===
Initially the production was conceived and produced under the provisionary title Projeto Açores (Project Azores).

Premiering on 26 March 2007 in prime-time, this episode was seen by almost 1.9 million Portuguese (or 19.7% of the average audience), being the best result in six-years to date.

On 26 September 2008, the first Gala da Ficção Nacional, organized by Portuguese television channel TVI, was held. During the four hours, 40 actors were remembered and honoured from decades of programming. Prior to the nights events, an audience poll was carried out to determine the favourite telenovela on Portuguese television. From a pool of 28 telenovelas listed, five were selected and finally, the Ilha dos Amores was selected by viewers.

Carlos César, president of the regional government, donated 350,000 Euros to the telenovela production team, in order to promote regional tourism. In addition, the regional airline SATA provided 600 flights between Lisbon-Ponta Delgada-Lisbon, for a period of ten months to support the production team. Another 175 inter-island flights, as well as connections between Lisbon and Toronto were also completed between January and August.

Filming was also supported by the local authorities of Vila Franca do Campo, Povoação, Lagoa, Nordeste and Ribeira Grande, who helped in scouting and setup for scenes in squares, gardens, parks, ports and buildings.

The freighter that took Jaime from Ponta Delgada to Canada in the first episode, was CGI: the design was made in 3D and finalized in post-production.

Four professionals recruited from France travelled to the island of São Miguel, in order to film the accident that caused the death of Jaime and Beatriz. The accident was filmed on the road atop of the Sete Cidades massif, overlooking the Lagoa das Sete Cidades, at the scenic overlook of Vista do Rei.

=== Music ===
The series resulted in a soundtrack of popular songs, headlined by Canção do Mar, a version by Diana Basto, and adapted from the popular version of Dulce Pontes.

1. Canção do Mar – Diana Basto
2. Mariana – Luís Represas (Mariana's Theme)
3. Pássaro Azul – André Sardet (Tomé's Theme)
4. The Moment You Believe – Melanie C (Mariana and Miguel's Theme)
5. Refúgio – Pedro Khima (Tobias's Theme)
6. Três Vidas – Ritual Tejo (André's Theme)
7. Sentimento – Rita Guerra (Cecília's Theme)
8. Sei Que Sabes Que Sim – EZ Special (Miguel's Theme)
9. Ilumina-me – Pedro Abrunhosa (Clara and Tomé's Theme)
10. Na Maré De Ti – Gil do Carmo (Carlota and Rui's Theme)
11. Meu Coração Abandonado – Viviane (Glorinha's Theme)
12. Palavras Minhas – Carlos Martins e Carlos do Carmo (Henrique's Theme)
13. Caçador de Sóis – Ala Namorados (JP's Theme)
14. As Cores do Céu – Luís Alberto Bettencourt
15. Ilha dos Amores – Paula Teixeira (Theme of the Azores)
16. Vida Proíbida – Sépia (Luísa's Theme)
17. Tudo Ou Nada (Ser Melhor) – Gutto (Carmo's Theme)
18. Perigo e Sedução – Sofia Gaspar (Madalena's Theme)
19. Já Se Sabe – Nuno Brito (Gil's Theme)

In addition to:

- Por Ti Corri Pelo Mundo, Ricardo Moraes
- Outro Futuro, Balla
- Não mexas no tempo, André Sardet/Viviane
- Por ti, vou de romeiro, Luis Alberto Bettencourt

=== Plot ===
Beginning in 1977, in the civil parish of Ponta Garça, on the island of São Miguel, the story has its basis in the relationship between Jaime Valente (Hugo Tavares) and Beatriz Machado da Câmara (Vera Kolodzig), who were childhood sweethearts. Jaime is a poor farmer's son and Beatriz the wealthy heiress to a fortune, but secretly (over time) they begin a clandestine romance under fear of her family. Jaime and Beatriz eventually decide to runaway to Canada, after her family discovers their intentions. But, her family threatens Jaime's imprisonment under trumped-up charges of kidnapping minors. Jaime therefore escapes to Canada by himself, while Beatriz promises to join him when she becomes legal age.

Each writes letters of their dreams and future intentions, but, neither receive these letters. They are convinced that each has forgotten the other. Then, Beatriz receives a visit from Alice (Adriana Moniz), who states that she is carrying Jaime's child, and was convinced of his "betrayal". Behind this intrigue was Henrique Medeiros (Rui Drummond), a neighbour and would-be pretendant to Beatriz. It was Henrique who had informed the Machado da Câmara clan of Jaime and Beatriz's elopement, and who paid Alice to lie about her pregnancy.

But, Henrique's motives were never realized, as Beatriz eventually married another. Jaime continued to wait for letters that never arrived, until he eventually heard that Beatriz had married. Yet, determined to seek his dreams, he continued to work hard and raised a fortune, established a family with an Azorean immigrant. Both Beatriz and Jaime decided to forget their young loves. But, 30 years later, their lives and positions had changed. Jaime becomes a millionaire and Beatriz's family in bankruptcy. Fruit of failed business ventures, Beatriz's principal income comes from her family's plantation and tea factory. A widow, with three daughters Clara Machado da Câmara (Sofia Alves), Mónica Machado da Câmara (Diana Chaves) e Mariana Machado da Câmara (Joana Solnado), her future is bleak. Against his son's and second wife's protests, Jaime decides to return to São Miguel, in order to manage his business interests. In the intervening years, Jaime had anonymously purchased the lands of the Machado da Câmara clan, and was preparing to purchase the bank holding the loans of the family, as well. Awash in debt, Beatriz accepts the sale of the properties and sets a meeting with the unknown Canadian investor to make a proposal. On the day of the meeting, Jaime and Beatriz encounter in the street. But, it is a tragic encounter: their cars collide and fall off a cliff into a deep ravine. Both die.

Clara, Beatriz's daughter and Tomé Valente (Marco D'Almeida), son of Jaime (both 28) recognize the other in the cemetery, and immediately hate the other. Tomé is aggressive, cold and powerful businessman, and swears revenge on the beautiful, intelligent and unresigned adversary. These events introduce the historical conflicts within the story, and occur in the first few episodes of the series.

=== Story ===
Clara and Tomé eventually build a love-hate relationship that extends throughout the series. Along with these are Miguel Valente (Carloto Cotta) and Mariana, their younger siblings, who also develop relationships with their opposite. Throughout the series these protagonists fall in and out of love, build conflicts and establish truces, just to be reunited. Miguel and Mariana are opposites and are manipulated by Anabela Santos (Joana Santos), who attempts to separate the young couple for the Valente family fortune. Similarly, Miguel and Tomé's step-mother who married Jaime for his money, continues to play a puppet-master along with Henrique Medeiros.

== Cast and characters ==
Among the actors who declined to participate in the telenovela were: Ana Padrão, Dina Félix da Costa, Eunice Muñoz, Hélio Pestana, Irene Cruz, Joana Figueira, Joaquim Horta, Luís Lourenço, Márcia Leal, Paula Lobo Antunes, Paulo Pires, Ricardo Carriço, Rita Lopes and Sara Barradas. Eunice Muñoz, who could not accept a casting as Maria Amélia Machado da Câmara (which was given to Elisa Lisboa) due to other professional responsibilities, later joined the cast as Emília, a homeless woman who became the friend of Mariana.

Joana Solnado became one of the more accomplished actresses of her generation, in her role as Mariana Machado da Câmara, with her characterization of a traumatized young woman. Similarly, António Capelo, took on the monstrous role as the evil protagonist Henrique Medeiros. Both provided interpretations that marked their careers.

Many of the actors involved in the series came from the novela Tempo de Viver, including Joana Solnado, Manuela Couto, Marco D'Almeida, Marco Delgado and Sofia Nicholson. Other actors graduated from the series Tempo de Viver, such as José Wallenstein, Manuel Wiborg and Pedro Teixeira.

== Reception ==
=== Ratings ===
The first episode of Ilha dos Amores, was the third-most viewed fiction series on TVI, with Filha do Mar being second, and A Outra the most viewed.

The telenovela was repeated in 2011 by TVI during the lunchtime hour. This repeat allowed TVI to take the leadership of the slot, then dominated by RTP1 and SIC.
