= Five Days, Five Nights =

Five Days, Five Nights may refer to:

- Five Days, Five Nights (novel), a novel by Álvaro Cunhal
- Five Days, Five Nights (1960 film)
- Five Days, Five Nights (1996 film)
