= Sei Lá =

- Directed by: Joaquim Leitão
- Based on: Sei Lá by Margarida Rebelo Pinto
- Starring: Leonor Seixas; Rita Pereira; Pedro Granger; Rui Unas; Tino Navarro; António Pedro Cerdeira; Paula Lobo Antunes
- Release date: 3 April 2014
- Running time: 110 minutes
- Country: Portugal
- Language: Portuguese

Sei Lá is a 2014 Portuguese romantic comedy film directed by Joaquim Leitão and based on a novel of the same name by Margarida Rebelo Pinto. It stars Leonor Seixas.

== Cast ==
- Leonor Seixas
- Rita Pereira
- Pedro Granger
- Rui Unas
- Tino Navarro
- António Pedro Cerdeira
- Paula Lobo Antunes

== Reception ==
In Público's Ípsilon, Jorge Mourinha gave the film a rating of "bad" and Vasco Câmara gave it a rating of "mediocre".
