= Doce Tentação =

- Genre: Comedy, Drama, Romance
- Created by: Sandra Santos
- Starring: Mariana Monteiro; Diogo Amaral; Sofia Ribeiro; Pedro Barroso
- Theme music composer: Patrícia Candoso
- Opening theme: Doce Tentação
- Country of origin: Portugal
- Original language: Portuguese
- No. of seasons: 1
- No. of episodes: 215

Original release
- Network: TVI
- Release: January 8, 2012 - March 9, 2013

Related
- Sedução; Giras e Falidas

Doce Tentação is a Portuguese telenovela that started airing on TVI on 8 January 2012 and stopped broadcasting on March 9, 2013. This telenovela was authored by Sandra Santos, from Casa da Criação (Creation House), a group of soap opera/series authors of Plural Entertainment. The slogan of this telenovela is "Love that bears fruit, sows envy!". The protagonists are Mariana Monteiro (Esperanca/Ana Clara), Diogo Amaral (Tiago Marques Flor), Pedro Barroso (Miguel Vieira da Silva) and Sofia Ribeiro (Francisa Vieira da Silva).

== Synopsis ==
When Esperança arrives in Ribeira das Flores, one woman, Francisca Vieira da Silva (Sofia Ribeiro), is the first to be opposed to her presence. Rich and unscrupulous, Francisca dominates the town. Nobody talks about it, but almost everyone does what she wants. It is certain that Francisca possesses something that her deceased mother Antónia Santinho Vieira da Silva (Mario João Luís) left her, which allows her to reign over Ribeira das Flores, along with her godfather, the feared Ricardo Sequeira (Marco Delgado). But not even he knows Francisca's trump card, that she has always wanted Tiago. She fell in love with him when she was a teenager, tried to seduce him, but he refused her advances. This hurt her pride as a woman and she has not forgotten it even to this day. Tiago's persistent refusals only make her want him even more. She tries to convince him that his family had nothing to do with the failure of Marques Flor, but Tiago does not believe her and wants nothing to do with her family. Tiago is determined to discover the truth. Against everything and everyone.

Francisca realizes that Esperança is a threat long before knowing the feelings that Tiago begins to have for her. When it is apparent that Esperança is about to steal the love of the man that she has always wanted, Francisca loses her head and tries to remove her rival in any way. She is willing to do anything, from abusing the influence she has over the people in town, to carrying out dangerous and Machiavellian schemes. Francisca swears that Tiago is not hers, but he will also never be Esperança's! She has the support of Miguel Vieira da Silva (Pedro Barroso), her adoptive brother, in her struggle.

Miguel recognizes Esperança's beauty as soon as he sees her. Arrogant and used to every attention by the most beautiful women, he finds her simple and inferior to himself. When Francisca commands him to approach Esperança and find out where she comes from, Miguel "obeys" with resentment. But soon later he perceives she is different from other women and she captivates him more profoundly than he expected. Then he tries to seduce her. Thinking him well-intentioned, Esperança gives what she considers to be a friendship without ulterior motives.

Tiago is infuriated with the two's intimacy, and does everything to warn Esperança of Miguel's true character. And where the rivalry between Tiago and Miguel was already legendary in the town, from this moment on it becomes visceral. A relentless fight starts for Esperança's heart.

== Cast ==
- Mariana Monteiro as Esperança/Ana Clara
- Diogo Amaral as Tiago Marques Flor
- Sofia Ribeiro as Francisca Vieira da Silva
- Pedro Barroso as Miguel Vieira da Silva
- Marco Delgado as Ricardo Sequeira
- Paula Neves as Augusta Santinho
- Pedro Lima as Gabriel Ventura
- Carla Andrino as Manuela de Telles Brito
- Cristovão Campos as Bernardo Coutinho
- Jessica Athaide as Diana de Telles Brito
- São José Correia as Dora
- Sofia Nicholson as Maria da Conceição (São) Domingos
- João Didelet as Evaristo Nobre
- Nuno Melo as Elias Pereira
- Luis Vicente as Jeremias Vila Verde
- Mafalda Teixeira as Gloria
- Isaac Alfaiate as Henrique
- Tiago Aldeia as Fausto
- Laura Galvão as Ana Luisa de Telles Brito
- Ricardo Sá as Tomé Pereira
- Lia Carvalho as Filipa Nobre
- Catarina Gouveia as Nuria Freitas
- Rui Andrade as Ruben Moreira
- Suzana Farrajota as Lígia (The Woman in Red)

Guest Appearance:

- Elisa Lisboa as Efigénia de Jesus
- Orlando Costa as Adérito Cunha
- Miguel Guilherme as João Coutinho (Father of Bernardo and ex-husband of Celeste)

Special Appearance:

- Maria João Luis as Antonia Vieira da Silva (Mother of Francisca, sister of Augusta and lover of Ricardo)
- Virgílio Castelo as Carlos Marques Flor (Father of Tiago)
- Sylvie Rocha as Alice Marques Flor (Mother of Tiago)

Child cast:

- Simão Santos as Simão Dias
- Bernardo Vasconcelos as Pedro dos Anjos
- Beatriz Laranjeira as Clara (Clarinha) Silva

Additional cast:

- Adérito Lopes as the Journalist
- Afonso Lagarto as Raptor
- Alexandra Rocha
- Alexandra Sargento
- Alexandre da Silva as GNR
- Augusto Portela
- Bruno Rodrigues as the Photographer
- Carlos Saltão as Brandão Andrade
- Eduardo Viana
- Eurico Lopes as Inspector Mota
- Fernando Elias as the Lawyer
- Fernando Tavares Marques
- Filipe Gaidão
- Gonçalo Lello as Inspector
- Gonçalo Robalo as Tiago Marques Flor (child)
- Inês Stock as Francisca Santinho Vieira da Silva (child)
- Isabel Simões
- Ivo Lucas as Adérito Cunha (child)
- Isaac Alfaiate as Henrique Martins / Diogo Bastos (Supposed boyfriend of Esperança)
- Joana Caçador
- Joana Hilário
- João Loy as Raptor
- João Pedreiro
- Jorge Silva as António Freitas (Father of Nuria)
- José Boavida
- Laurinda Gaspar
- Leonor Alcácer as Celeste Coutinho (Mother of Bernardo)
- Luís Lucas
- Luís Romão
- Luís Teodoro
- Manuel Lourenço
- Maria Zamora as Noémia Freitas (Mother of Nuria)
- Margarida André
- Margarida Martinho as Efigénia de Jesus (child)
- Marina Albuquerque
- Mário Franco
- Marta Gil
- Miguel Bogalho
- Nuno Porfírio
- Olívia Ortiz as Vanessa Cristina Borrão
- Patrícia Resende
- Paulo Jorge Santos
- Pedro Bargado
- Pedro Leitão
- Pedro Macedo as Paulo (Friend of Filipa and Nuria)
- Peter Michael
- Ricardo Peres
- Teresa Branco

== Soundtrack ==
Doce Tentação

Soundtrack album by Various artists
- Genre: Various genres
- Language: Portuguese; English

Track listing
No.	Title	Band	Length
1.	"Quando As Almas São Iguais"	Patrícia Candoso
2.	"Cedo o meu Lugar"	Mesa
3.	"Shake It Out"	Florence & The Machine
4.	"Príncipe do Nada"	Lúcia Moniz
5.	"Quinta-feira"	Doismileoito
6.	"Tu Vais Querer"	Homem dos 7 Instrumentos
7.	"I Hate You But I Love You"	Russian Red
8.	"Já Foi"	Susana Félix
9.	"Com Medo de Voar"	Classificados
10.	"Fado Arcado"	Os Lábios
11.	"Elefantes Azuis"	Trêsporcento
12.	"Anda Comigo Ver os Aviões"	Os Azeitonas
13.	"A Room In The Sky 1978"	Daniela Galbin
14.	"Brincos de Cereja"	Os Capitães de Areia
15.	"A Vida é Um Carrossel"	Citânia
16.	"Página Secreta"	Eden
17.	"No Caminho Das Pedras"	João Só e Abandonados
18.	"I Won´t Let Go"	Raquel
19.	"A Hora de Estar Bem"	Fragmentos

== Trivia ==
Initially, the soap opera which was going to be called Doce Tentação, changed its title to Escrito no Céu (Written in Heaven) in October 2011, but at the end of 2011 it reverted to its original title.
