= Meu Amor =

- Genre: Telenovela
- Created by: António Barreira
- Directed by: Hugo de Sousa
- Starring: Margarida Marinho; Alexandra Lencastre; Rita Pereira; Paulo Pires; Rodrigo Menezes; Marco D'Almeida; Lídia Franco
- Opening theme: Mais Um Dia by José Cid
- Country of origin: Portugal
- Original language: Portuguese
- No. of episodes: 319

Production
- Producer: José Retré
- Running time: 60 minutes

Original release
- Network: TVI
- Release: October 19, 2009 – October 23, 2010

Related
- Flor do Mar; Sedução

Meu Amor (My Love) is a Portuguese telenovela (soap opera) which aired from October 19, 2009, to October 23, 2010, on TVI. The show won the 2010 International Emmy award for best telenovela.

== Synopsis ==
In the midst of the beautiful flowers and views of Alentejo, Mel Fontes works on a homestead as a peasant, being the daughter of the homestead's homekeeper. However, clandestinely, she's the girlfriend of Bernardo Machado de Castro, the son of the homestead's owner. Because they know Bernardo's father won't support such love, they plan on escaping, but they get caught and Mel and her sister Clara are banned from the homestead, while Bernardo is forced to go with the father alongside Rafael Vargas Mota, the son of millionaire Caetano Vargas Mota, and the homekeeper/Mel and Clara's father in a flower-exportation business trip to Amsterdam, but the flight is fatal because the plane crashes a few miles before reaching its destination. The crash kills the homestead owner and keeper and Rafael as well, except Bernardo who is missing. Who loses more beloved for the tragedy is Patrícia, Rafael's wife, and Bernardo's sister, who is in charge of guaranteeing that Mel and Clara really are away from the homestead, though she gives them money. Caetano ain't too happy either, because Rafael is for him his only heir since he doesn't talk with his daughter Helena, the owner of a big fashion workshop, for many years. Although his luck changes when he finds a letter, written by the homekeeper before he left to Amsterdam only to die - the letter reads that either Mel or Clara, his daughters, is Caetano's illegitimate daughter, and he will do anything and everything to find who is her. While that happens, Mel and Clara are accepted in the home of their extremely greedy uncle Horácio, who is believed to have a huge fortune, but is in misery, which only his troubled and clumsy accountant Cláudio knows about. Cláudio will fall in love with Mel, but will have to dispute her when she finds out Bernardo is alive, and returns to Portugal to refind his love and family. As for Helena, a woman who feared love for a long time, will refind it as she gets engaged with taxi driver Quim, despite having to dispute it with Patrícia, who finds love with said man. Things get a little tricky for Helena, when her supposedly deceased mother Estela returns, 22 years after her death simulation, to conclude her personal revenge on her daughter for the death of someone she loved...

== Cast ==
=== Main cast ===
- Margarida Marinho as Helena de Aguiar Vargas Mota
- Alexandra Lencastre as Patrícia Machado de Castro Vargas Mota Correia
- Paulo Pires as Joaquim António Correia (Quim)
- Rita Pereira as Carmelita Fontes/Vargas Mota (Mel)
- Marco D'Almeida as Bernardo Machado de Castro
- Rodrigo Menezes as Cláudio Rodrigues
- José Wallenstein as Alberto Fonseca
- Cristina Homem de Mello as Fernanda Lopes Fonseca
- Isabel Medina as Glória Lopes Gouveia
- António Pedro Cerdeira as Leonardo Correia
- Patrícia Tavares as Dolores Maria Junqueira
- Núria Madruga as Camila Correia Machado de Castro
- Susana Arrais as Dulce da Boa Morte
- Dina Félix da Costa as Elisa Lopes
- Sofia Ribeiro as Clara Fontes
- Francisco Côrte-Real as Valentim Mendes
- Joana Duarte as Maria Lopes Gouveia
- Pedro Barroso as Jorge de Aguiar Vargas Mota
- Ana Catarina Afonso as Judite Maria

=== Guest cast ===
- Márcia Breia as Adelaide Raposo
- Elisa Lisboa as Inácia da Purificação
- Maria Emília Correia as Lurdes Correia
- Lídia Franco as Estela de Aguiar Vargas Mota
- Manuel Cavaco as Horácio Barqueta
- Nicolau Breyner as Caetano Vargas Mota

=== Children ===
- Alexandre Jorge as Miguel Lopes Fonseca
- Inês Seco as Diana Correia

== Awards and nominations ==
Year	Award	Category	Result	Ref.
2010	International Emmy Award	Best Telenovela	Won	
