= Manuel Coelho =

Manuel Coelho is a Portuguese name, which may refer to any of the following people:

- Manuel Maria Coelho, Portuguese military officer
- Manuel Rodrigues Coelho, Portuguese composer
- Manuel Coelho da Silva, Portuguese actor
