= Mariana Monteiro =

Portuguese actress

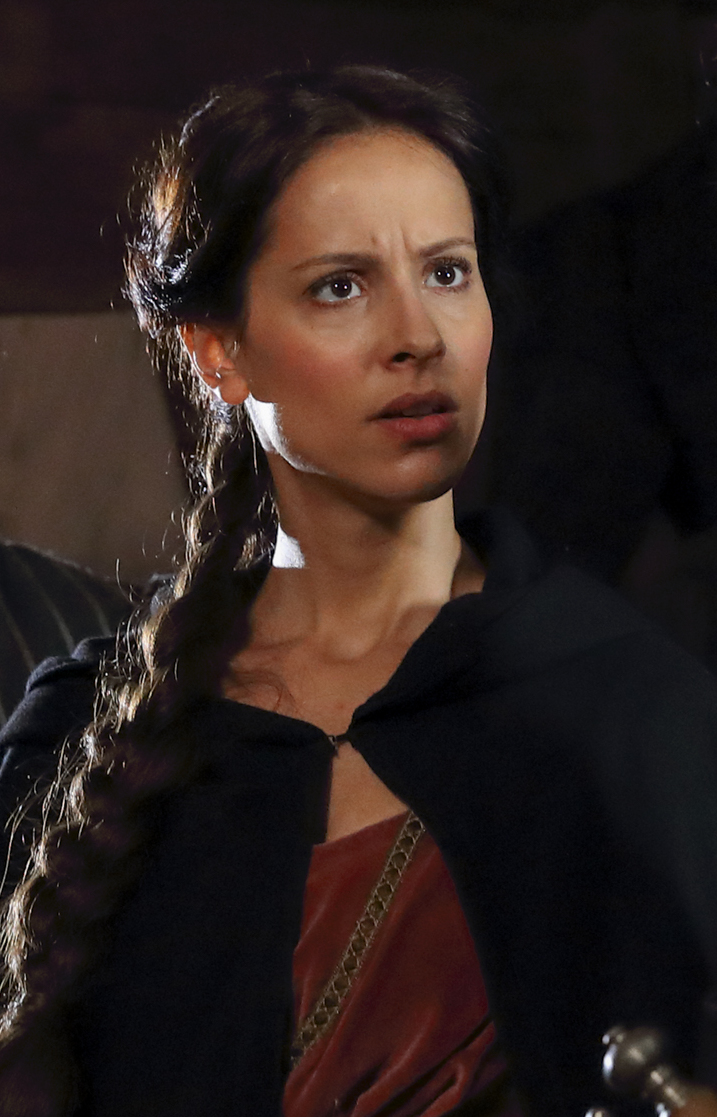
- Mariana Monteiro performing in Ministério do Tempo (RTP).
- Born: Mariana Vaz Fernandes Meliço Monteiro; 17 November 1988 (age 37); Porto, Portugal
- Occupations: Actress and model

Mariana Monteiro (born 17 November 1988 in Porto) is a Portuguese actress, and model.

== Biography ==
Born in Porto, Mariana Monteiro moved to Lisbon at the age of 16 in 2005. She performed in Morangos com Açúcar, a Portuguese series broadcast daily from 30 August 2003 to 15 September 2012 on the Portuguese TV station TVI.

Monteiro became an exclusive TVI actress until 2013, when she made part of the cast of Doce Tentação. In 2006, she performed in Doce Fugitiva and in 2007 in Fascínios. Her relationship with João Mota, winner of the 2nd edition of Casa dos Segredos, attracted some attention from the Portuguese media.

In 2014 Monteiro moved to RTP to co-host the 2nd edition of the show The Voice Portugal.

For many years, she has been the face of the Portuguese insurance company Tranquilidade.
