= Paulo Pires =

Portuguese actor and model (born 1967)

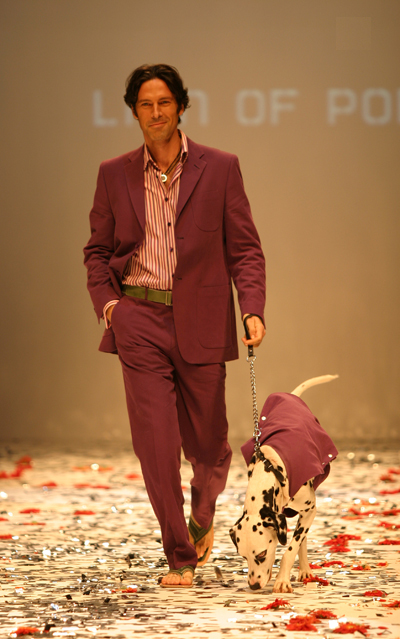
- Born: 26 February 1967 (age 59); Lisbon, Portugal
- Occupations: Television actor Film actor Former Stage actor Former fashion model
- Years active: 1993–present
- Spouse: Astrid Werdnig
- Children: 2 daughters - Chlöe Pires, Zoe Pires
- Awards: Portuguese Golden Globe, 1996

Paulo Pires (born 26 February 1967) is a Portuguese television and film actor and former stage actor and fashion model, known for his work in Portuguese and Spanish television and films. He was named Portuguese Theatre Personality of the Year in the 1996 Portuguese Golden Globes. In October 2008 The Biography Channel aired a documentary covering 20 years of his life and work in entertainment.

== Career ==
In 1996, Pires received a Portuguese Golden Globes for 'Personalidade do Ano' (Personality of the Year) for his work in theater, but has gained recognition his roles in multiple television series, including his playing Martim Botelho in 251 episodes of Deixa-me Amar, playing the "evil twins" Vasco and Victor Ferreira in 237 episodes of Olhos nos Olhos, playing Quim Correia in 348 episodes of Meu Amor, and for hosting 222 episodes of Mundo VIP from 1996 through 2001.

He made his first film appearance in 1993 as Corto Maltese in the film Zéfiro, directed by José Álvaro Morais, followed by a co-starring role in Cinco Dias, Cinco Noites by José Fonseca e Costa (1996).

He has appeared regularly on Portuguese television in series including Jornalistas (1999), Ganância (2001), Ana e os Sete (2003), Maré Alta (2004), Segredo (2005), and "Até Amanhã Camaradas". He was one of the presenters of Mundo Vip (1998), on the Portuguese independent television channel SIC (Sociedade Independente de Comunicação).

He has also appeared on Spanish television in the series Los Serranos (2004), Fuera de Control (2006), and Ellas y el sexo débil (2006). In 2007 he co-starred in the drama series Deixa-me Amar, followed by Olhos nos Olhos. He is currently featured in television in Meu Amor.

Since beginning his television career he has returned to the cinema occasionally with appearances in films including com O Fascínio by Fonseca e Costa (2003), Maria e as Outras by José de Sá Caetano (2004), A rapariga no espelho by Pedro Fortes (2004), O Milagre Segundo Salomé by Mário Barroso (2004), and Do Outro Lado do Mundo by Leandro Ferreira (2007).

In 2000 Paulo Pires married Astrid Werdnig, psychologist and former model. The couple have one daughter, Chlöe, born in 2004. ₥

== Partial filmography ==
=== Television ===
- Salsa e Merengue (1996) (Series) as Vasco
- Mundo VIP (222 episodes, 1996-2001) as Host
- Riscos (1997) (Series)
- Globos de Ouro 1996 (1997)
- Gala 5º Aniversário SIC (1997)
- Não Há Duas Sem Três (1 episode, 1997) as Detective Almeida
- Médico de Família (6 episodes, 1998)
- Terra Mãe (130 episodes, 1998) as Álvaro Cunha
- A Vida Como Ela É (2 episodes, 1999)
- Jornalistas (52 episodes, 1999-2000) as Alex
- O Lampião da Estrela (2000) as Paulo
- Aniversário (2000) as António
- O Bairro da Fonte (1 episode, 2001)
- Querido Professor (1 episode, 2001)
- Ganância (150 episodes, 2001) as Bernardo
- Um Estranho em Casa (3 episodes, 2002)
- Les frangines (2002) as Lorenzo
- Fúria de Viver (150 episodes, 2002) as João Castel Novo
- O Olhar da Serpente (150 episodes, 2002-2003) as Paulo Pereira Fonseca
- Maré Alta (5 episodes, 2004)
- Les jumeaux oubliés (2004) as Paul
- Ana E os Sete (62 episodes, 2003-2005) as David Vilar
- Inspector Max (1 episode, 2005) as Nelson
- Los Serrano (3 episodes, 2004-2005) as Paul
- 29 Golpes (2005) as João
- Os Serranos (4 episodes, 2005) as Guilherme
- Triângulo Jota (2 episodes, 2006) as Eduardo Calafate
- 7 Vidas (1 episode, 2006) as Fernando
- Fuera de control (12 episodes, 2006) as Diego
- Ellas y el sexo débil (4 episodes, 2006) as Christian
- Espírito de Natal (2006) as Francisco
- Floribella (2 episodes, 2007) as Christian
- Coração Navegador (2007) as Pedro Soares Castro
- Casos da Vida (1 episode, 2008) as Joaquim
- Deixa-me Amar (251 episodes, 2007-2008) as Martim Botelho
- Morangos com Açúcar 5 ( 3 episódios, 2008)
- Fama Show (10 episodes, 2008-2010) as Host
- Olhos nos Olhos (237 episodes, 2008-2009) as Vasco and Victor Ferreira
- Equador (9 episodes, 2008-2009) as Frederico Albuquerque
- Meu Amor (348 episodes, 2009-2010) as Quim Correia
- Anjo Meu (1 episode, 2011) as Rogério
- Doida Por Ti (2012-2013) as Mário Varela
- Madre Paula (2017) as João V
- White Lines (2020) as George

=== Film ===
- Zéfiro (1993) as Corto Maltese
- Cinco Dias, Cinco Noites (1996) as André
- A Rapariga no Espelho (2003) as Vítor Stuart
- O Fascínio (2003) as Pedro Barbosa
- O Milagre segundo Salomé (2004) as Mota Santos
- O Agente de Filipe II (2007) as Cristovão de Moura
- Do Outro Lado do Mundo (2008) as Lourenço
- Um Amor de Perdição (2008) as Santos Sousa
- Second Life (2009) as Pepe
