= Telhados de Vidro =

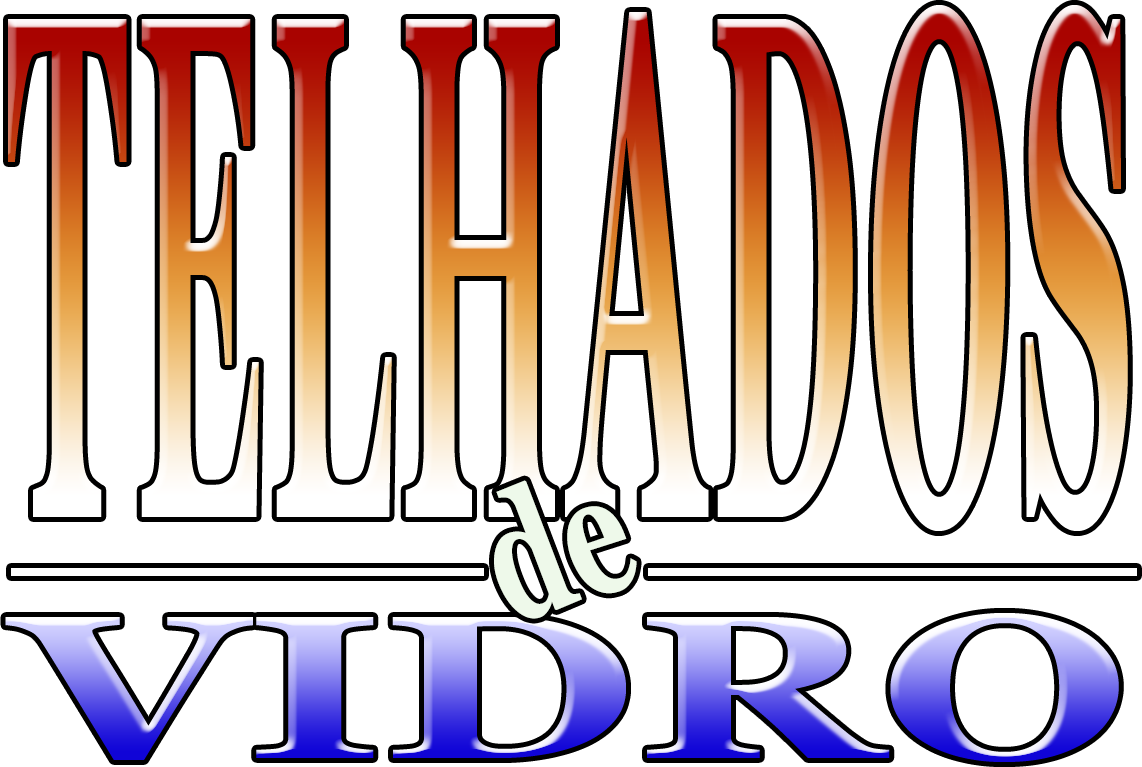
- Genre: Telenovela
- Created by: Rosa Lobato de Faria
- Developed by: Atlântida Estúdios
- Directed by: Carlos Coelho da Silva
- Starring: João Ricardo; Rosa Lobato de Faria; Tozé Martinho; Filomena Gonçalves; Eugénia Bettencourt; Carmen Santos; Sofia Grilo; André Maia; Natalina José; Carla Salgueiro; Mané Ribeiro
- Opening theme: Telhados de Vidro by Dina
- Ending theme: Telhados de Vidro by Dina
- Country of origin: Portugal
- Original language: Portuguese
- No. of episodes: 120

Production
- Running time: 30min
- Production company: Atlântida Estúdios

Original release
- Network: TVI
- Release: 22 February – 12 August 1993

Telhados de Vidro (literally Glass Roofs) was a Portuguese telenovela produced by Atlântida Estúdios for TVI, written by Rosa Lobato de Faria. It was the channel's first national telenovela and the first such production for a private television channel in Portugal.

== Plot ==
The Duarte Santos family faces financial difficulties and Catarina thinks of becoming a nurse again. She calls her friend Joana, putting him in contact with António Cortesão Vaz, the aging owner of Vazotel. With Zé Maria weighing in on the financial downturns, Carolina decides to take care of the businessman. Ricardo receives an envelope with money from Arlindo and Suzete. At Vaz's company, Cláudia is replaced by Rosário, which Maria Clara didn't like. Cláudio Vaz shows an interest in Carolina and asks Jorge Malheiros to talk to the lawyer. Cortesão Vaz dies of an illness, leaving the presidency of Vazotel at stake. His death is celebrated by Maria Clara and Viriato, while Joana and Henrique discuss the future of the company, with the latter likely becoming the new president. After Vaz's funeral, Maria Clara's behavior changes, insulting Rosário and threatening her to quit, owing everything to Henrique.

== Cast ==
Actor	Character
Adriana Barral	Isabel
Alexandra Diogo	Cláudia
Alexandra Leite	Elena Sardi
André Maia	Viriato Zuzarte Esteves
Carla de Sá	Laurinha Duarte Santos
Carla Lupi	Henriqueta Vieira (jovem)
Carlos Pimenta	Cipriano Alves
Carla Salgueiro	Susana Sardi (jovem)
Filomena Gonçalves	Rosário Vieira
Jacinto Ramos	António Cortesão Vaz
João Ricardo	Faneca
José Boavida	Jorge Malheiros
Luís Zagalo	Xavier
Mané Ribeiro	Madalena Silvã de Melo
Manuela Carlos	Carolina Duarte Santos
Manuela Carona	Pilar Silvã de Melo
Manuela Marle	Evelyn Santiago
Margarida Reis	Joana Simões
Mário Jacques	Fábio Sardi
Natalina José	Vitória da Cruz
Rita Alagão	Ana Sofia Silva de Melo
Rosa Lobato de Faria	Susana Sardi
Rui Luís Brás	Renato Sardi
Sofia Grillo	Luísa
Sylvie Rocha	Lídia
Tareka	Marta
Teresa Negrão	Maria da Conceição 'Chinita'
Tozé Martinho	Henrique Batalha
Vitor de Sousa	Jacinto

== Music ==
The opening theme, also titled Telhados de Vidro, was sung by Dina with lyrics from the creator of the telenovela. She also made "two or three" other songs played during the episodes., as stated by Dina in 2016.

== Airing ==
The novela made its first airing on 22 February 1993 in a prime slot, at 20:00, however from 30 March it moved to 18:15 while adding two-hour omnibuses on Sundays at 14:00. During the last weeks on air, it aired around 18:30. There was a first rerun from 10 May 1994, but it got canceled after two weeks on air.

On 3 July 1995, the second rerun began at a noon slot. Over time, by September, it moved to a slightly earlier timeslot, its old slot being occupied by Morena Clara. The rerun ended on 12 December and has not been rerun since.

== Availability ==
Following the reruns, the show was unavailable until January 2026, when episodes were added to TVI Player, the free VOD service owned by the channel.
