= Manuel Coelho da Silva =

Portuguese actor

- Born: Manuel Coelho da Silva; 15 December 1954 (age 71)
- Occupation: Actor
- Years active: 1970–present

Manuel Coelho da Silva (born 15 December 1954) is a Portuguese actor, mainly working at the D. Maria II National Theatre in Lisbon. He is also an artistic director at the Malaposta Cultural Center.

== Biography ==
Manuel Coelho da Silva made his acting debut in 1970, at the age of 16, with Grupo de Campolide, and went on to study at Escola Superior de Teatro. He later co-founded the Grupo Proposta e do Teatro Popular in Almada, and integrated his group with others. Around this time, he also appeared in film, radio, and television, and worked with directors such as Francisco Ribeiro (Ribeirinho), Carlos Avilez, Rogério Paulo, Filipe La Féria, Jean-Marie Villégier, Varela Silva, Silvio Purcaretti, and others. He also assisted the directors Jorge Listopad, Orlando Neves, António de Macedo, and Joaquim Benite.

Since 1978 he has been a part of Teatro Nacional D. Maria II, where he participated in a number of showings of William Shakespeare's The Merry Wives of Windsor, O Judeu, by Bernardo Santareno, Pedro, o Cru by António Patrício, Fígados de Tigre by Gomes de Amorim, and Romulus the Great by Durrenmatt, which was in Portugal and in Paris, at the Théâtre D'Europe in 1986. He also toured in Macau performing Samuel Beckett's Waiting for Godot.

== Appearances in television ==
Manuel Coelho has appeared in several Portuguese TV series. These appearances were either as part of the original cast, or as an actor for Portuguese remakes:

- Bem-Vindos a Beirais, Fanã, 2013–present
- Rebelde Way, Omar 2008–2009
- Deixa-me Amar, Válter Loureiro, 2007–2008
- Doce Fugitiva, Dr.ºMatos Lima, 2006–2007
- Anjo Selvagem, Gustavo Santos, 2001–2002
- Segredo de Justiça, Eurico Leal, 2001
- Os Lobos, Tiago Boaventura, 1998–1999
- Meu Querido Avô, Calisto, 1997
- Duarte & C.a, 1985–1989
- Origens, Maestro, 1983
- A Hora da Liberdade, Major Delfim Moura, 1974
