= Rita Pereira (actress) =

Portuguese actress and model

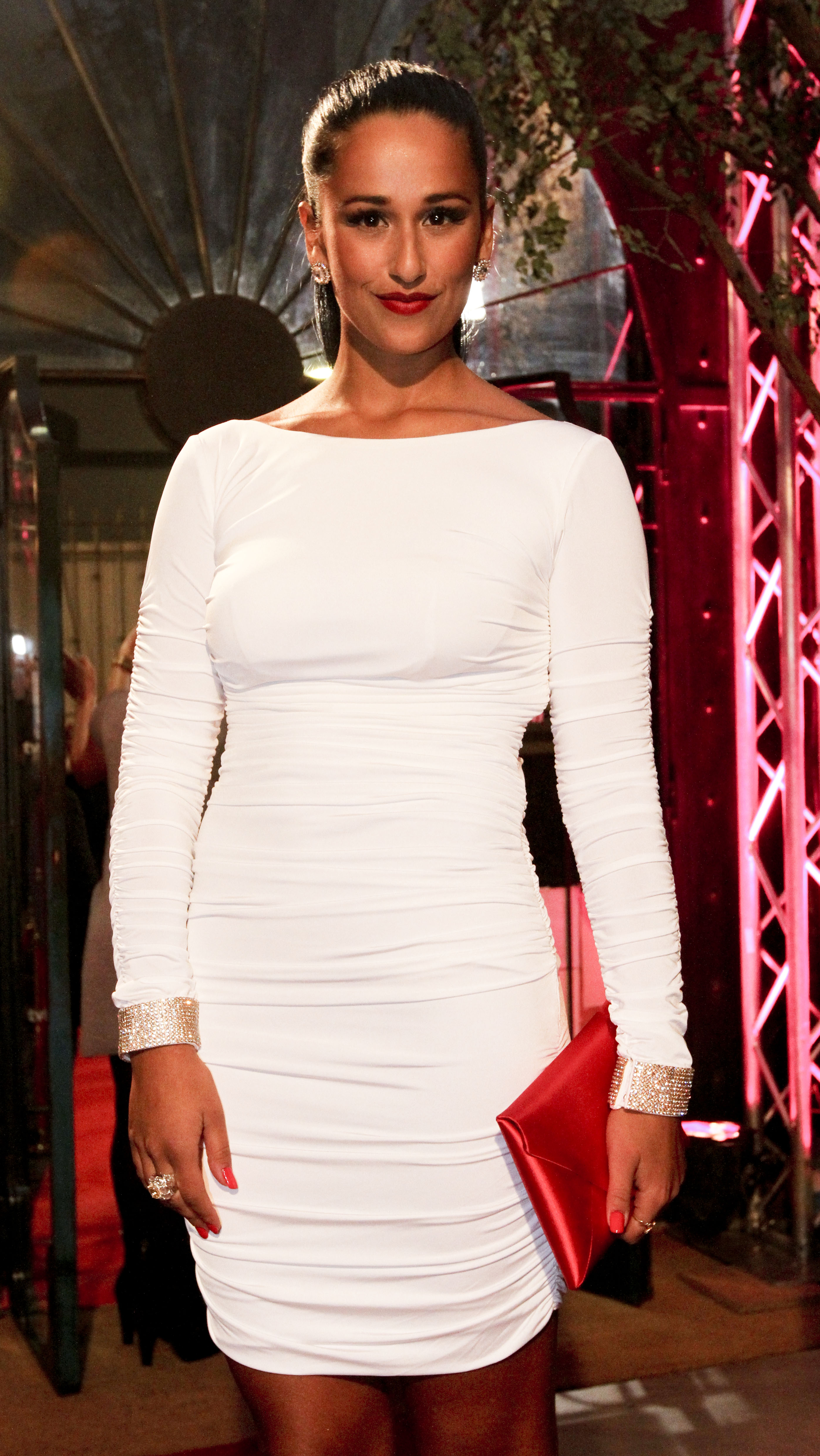
- Rita Pereira (2012)
- Born: Rita Andreia Martins Pereira; 13 March 1982 (age 44); Carcavelos, Cascais, Portugal
- Education: Autonomous University of Lisbon (BA)
- Occupations: Actress; model; TV presenter

Rita Pereira (born 1982 in Cascais) is a Portuguese actress and model.

== Biography ==
She began modelling at age 22, before becoming a television presenter for the Portuguese youth television show Sic Altamente, on channel SIC. She made her acting debut in the Portuguese telenovela Saber Amar, which aired on the Portuguese television station TVI. She continued her telenovela appearances for the station.

In 2005, Rita Pereira reached nationwide fame for her portrayal of Soraia Rochinha in the second season of TVI's Morangos com Açúcar. She later guest starred in the series Uma Aventura as Lucy in the episode Noite das Bruxas (Halloween) on SIC. Other roles include Maria Estrela in the 2006 telenovela Doce Fugitiva, Diana in Casos de Vida in 2008, and Alice Santos in Feitiço de Amor in 2008/2009. Rita participated in several philanthropic efforts, including an event in Funchal to help the victims of the 2010 Madeira floods and mudslides.

In 2009, Pereira starred as Mel Fontes in Meu Amor alongside Rodrigo Menezes, which won the 2010 International Emmy Award for the Best telenovela. Meu Amor was the first Portuguese telenovela to win an Emmy. She used to present the Portuguese singing contest Canta Comigo and in 2011, was Helena Borges in the telenovela Remédio Santo on TVI. In 2013, she was Fernanda Moreira in the telenovela Destinos Cruzados on TVI. She was a contestant on season 1 of Portuguese Dancing with the Stars, paired with Pedro Borralho. In 2015 and 2016, Rita was judge on Pequenos Gigantes, a Portuguese talent-show.

In 2015 and 2016 she played Luena da Silva in A Única Mulher and in 2017 she was Madalena Alvarenga in A Herdeira. Both A Única Mulher and A Herdeira were the most watched telenovelas in Portugal in the time they aired.
