= Blood Curse (film) =

- Theatrical release poster
- Directed by: Tiago Guedes; Frederico Serra
- Starring: Adriano Luz; Manuela Couto; Sara Carinhas; José Afonso Pimentel
- Release date: 2 March 2006
- Running time: 97 minutes
- Country: Portugal
- Language: Portuguese

Blood Curse (Portuguese: Coisa Ruim) is a 2006 Portuguese supernatural horror film directed by Tiago Guedes and Frederico Serra, which talks about demonic possession, exploring beliefs, superstitions, skepticism, fears and suspicions, in the context of a small village. It has been considered the first horror feature film from Portugal.

== Plot ==
Xavier Oliveira Monteiro (Adriano Luz) is a botanical researcher and university professor. He lives with his wife, children and a baby grandson in an apartment in the center of Lisbon. One day Xavier receives news of the death of his uncle, owner of a family manor in the village of Torrozelo in the municipality of Seia. To publish a study on the flora of Beira Interior, he decides to move with his family to the house. On arriving at the village, he becomes friends with the locals, whom he perceives to be very superstitious and believers in matters related to the occult. At first Xavier tries to ignore it, but strange events with no logical explanation, but coinciding with some local beliefs begin to occur to him and his family. Xavier decides to investigate these beliefs to find some explanation. It is then that Vicente, a former village priest (José Pinto) reveals to him something dark and macabre that happened in the past, and which gave rise to a terrible curse that plagues the village and which is directly related to Xavier and his family.

== Cast ==
art sheet
Actor/Actress	Character
Adriano Luz	Xavier Oliveira Monteiro
Manuela Couto	Helena Oliveira Monteiro
Sara Carinhas	Sofia
José Afonso Pimentel	Rui
João Santos	Ricardo
José Pinto	Priest Vicente
João Pedro Vaz	Priest Cruz
Elisa Lisboa	Dulce
Filipe Duarte	Luís
Gonçalo Waddington	António
Maria d'Aires	Rosa
Miguel Borges	Ismael
Rafaela Santos	Spouse de Ismael
Sara Barradas	Daughter de Ismael
Orlando Costa	Mr. Costa

== Reception ==
It won the 2006 Portuguese Golden Globe for Best Film.
