= Maria João Bastos =

Portuguese actress

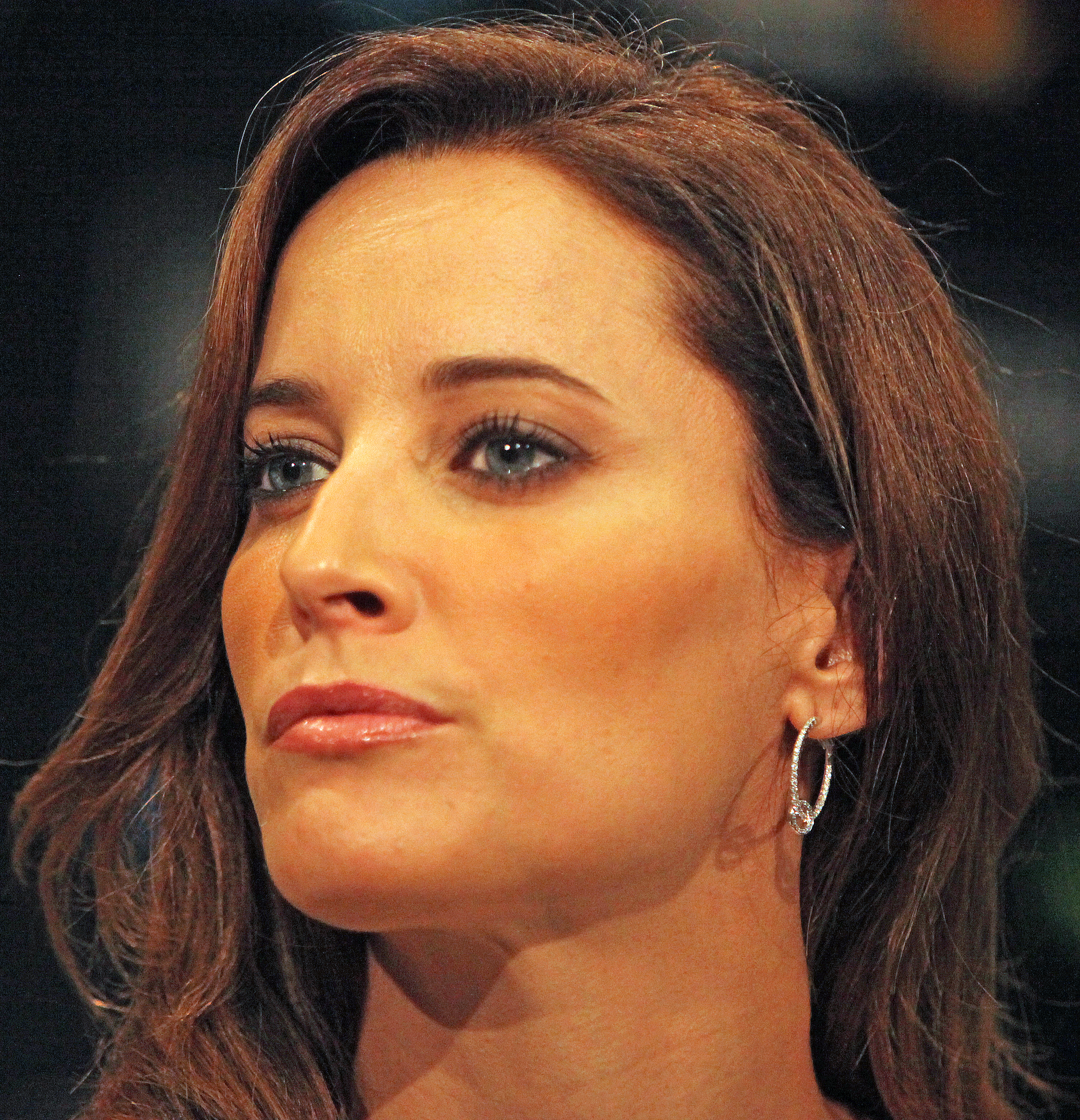
- Maria João in 2014
- Born: Maria João David da Silva Bastos; 18 June 1975 (age 50); Benavente, Portugal
- Occupation: Actress
- Years active: 1992–present

Maria João David da Silva Bastos (born 18 June 1975) is a Portuguese actress. She has participated in several Brazilian productions, becoming a known actress in Brazil.

== Biography ==
Maria João was born in Benavente, Santarém District. She holds a degree in Communication Sciences from the Independent University of Lisbon. Maria took an English course in England in 1993, a casting and video and dummy course at Visual LX in 1994 and a theater, film and television course in New York City in the year 2000. She signed an exclusive contract with The Portuguese television station, TVI.

Bastos is ambassador of the Jaguar car brand, and representative of the Italian brand Furla, in Portugal. Her character "Liliane Marise", a pimba music singer, in the telenovela Destinos Cruzados, was so remarkable that it released a CD that reached first place in the Portuguese music charts. Incarnating this same personage, she made a concert in MEO Arena, in Lisbon, in October 2013, and another in Guimarães shortly after. In 2015 she was juror of the Ídolos program at SIC.

She was the winner of the 2011 Portuguese Golden Globe as Best Film Actress for her performance in the film Mysteries of Lisbon.

== Filmography ==
=== Television ===
Year	Title	Role
1992	Cinzas	Maria João
1996	Desafios	Presenter with Fernanda Serrano
1997	Médico de Família	
1999	Todo o Tempo do Mundo	Marta Campos
2000	Alta Fidelidade	Carla
2001	Cavaleiros de Água Doce	Susana
2001	Querido Professor	Catarina
2001	Ganância	Joana
2001	A Minha Família É Uma Animação	
2002	O Clone	Amália
2003	Sabor da Paixão	Rita Coimbra
2004	Sítio do Picapau Amarelo	Isabel
2004	Só Gosto de Ti	Rita
2005	Segredo	Suzana
2005	No Comando	
2005	Mundo Meu	Sofia Salgado
2006	Tempo de Viver	Raquel Mendes
2008	Casos da Vida - Noivas de Maio	Vitória
2008	Casos da Vida - Casal do Ano	Susana
2009	Ecuador	Ann Jamerson
2009	Flor do Mar	Gabriela
2010	Sedução	Ester Vasconcelos
2011	Bairro	Diana
2013	Destinos Cruzados	Margarida Isabel Cabreira das Caldas (Liliane Marise)
2014	Boogie Oogie	Diana
2015	Coração d'Ouro	Beatriz Bacelar Castro de Aguiar
2017	Novo Mundo	Letícia
2020	A Espia	Rose Lawson
2023-2024	Flor sem Tempo	Leonor Valente
2026-present	Páginas da Vida	Marta Toledo Dias

=== Film ===
- A Ponte na Califórnia, realization of Pedro Amorim (2016), Short film
- Casanova Variations, realization of Michael Sturminger (2014)
- Bairro, realization of Jorge Cardoso, Lourenço de Mello, José Manuel Fernandes and Ricardo Inácio (2013)
- Linhas de Wellington, realização de Valeria Sarmiento (2012)
- Em Câmara Lenta, realization of Fernando Lopes (2012)
- Intriga Fatal, realization of António Borges Correia (2012), TV movie
- Catarina e os Outros, realization of André Badalo (2011), Short film
- Je M'Appelle Bernadette, realization of Jean Sagols (2011)
- A Moral Conjugal, realization of Artur Serra Araújo (2011)
- Mistérios de Lisboa, realization of Raul Ruiz (2010)
- Shoot Me, realization of André Badalo (2009), Short film
- O Último Condenado à Morte, realization of Francisco Manso (2009)
- O Inimigo sem Rosto, realization of José Farinha (2005)
- O Elevador, realization of Patrícia Sequeira (2005), Short film
- O Veneno da Madrugada, realization of Ruy Guerra - Brazil (2005)
- Cavaleiros de Água Doce, realization of Tiago Guedes (2001), TV movie
- Alta Fidelidade, realization of Tiago Guedes and Frederico Serra (2000), TV movie

== Stage ==
- O Método de Gronholm, staging of Virgílio Castelo (2005)

== Presentation of shows ==
- Presenter of show Wella, Lisbon (1997)
- Presenter of gala Globos de Ouro, SIC (2003)
- Presenter of the trophy delivery of the national sport, SIC (2004)
- Gala hostess "Fashion Model Awards", Fashion TV and SIC (2004)

== Advertising ==
- Mustela (1997)
- Mimosa
- TMN
- Optimus
- Daewoo
- Cerveja CoolBeer
- CTT (2004)
- Daníssimo (2005)
- Páginas Amarelas (2005)
- Cerveja Sagres (2013)
