= Olívia Ortiz =

Portuguese actress and television presenter

- Born: 13 February 1987 (age 39); Paris, France
- Occupations: Actress, Television presenter
- Years active: Actress: 2010–present TV presenter: 2012-present
- Website: facebook.com/oliviaortiz.oficial

Olívia Ortiz (born 13 February 1987 in Paris) is a Portuguese actress, tv host and beauty pageant titleholder.

== Biography ==
Started her career as a model in 2009, winner of an international beauty contest in Oxfordshire, UK, and as she became TW Steel luxury watch brand global ambassador. In the two following years this Portuguese beauty queen represented her country in many international contests.

In 2012, Olívia Ortiz was elected “Musa Triumph” and joined the exclusive set of women, with Cláudia Vieira, Isabel Figueira, Helena Coelho, Andreia Rodrigues e Luísa Beirão, who earned the title of “Musa Triumph” to represent the brand in Portugal.

From 2012 on, she started to appear on television. Hosted the show “GuestList” broadcast by TVI and cast of that channels productions. She got the role of Vanessa Cristina in the soap opera “Destinos Cruzados”, Helena Noronha in the TV show “I Love It” and in “Mulheres” performing as Liliana Neves.

In January 2015 she became host of the show Ora Acerta broadcast live by TVI.

She is sought after for advertising campaigns and has featured on the cover of magazines such as Men's Health, MAXIM e Noivas de Portugal.

== Miss Portugal ==
=== International beauty pageants ===
- Miss TW STEEL world 2010 in the UK - Winner
- Miss Supranational 2010 in Poland
- Miss Intercontinental Portugal 2011 in Spain
- Miss Exclusive of the World Portugal 2011 in Turkey
- Miss Continent International Tur 2012 in Brazil - Winner

== Filmography ==
=== Television ===
Year	Title	Role	Notes	Broadcast
2015	Ora Acerta	TV show presenter	Host	TVI
2014-2015	Mulheres	Liliana Neves	Additional Cast	TVI
2013-2014	I Love It	Helena Noronha	Cast	TVI
2013-2014	Guestlist	TV show host	Host	TVI
2013-2014	Destinos Cruzados	Vanessa Cristina	Additional Cast	TVI
2013	Maison Close	Infirmière Préfecture	Special Appearance	Noé Productions
2012	VIP	TV show host	Host	MVMtv
2012	Doce Tentação	Recepcionista	Special Appearance	TVI
2012	Anjo Meu	Secretária	Special Appearance	TVI

=== Cinema ===
- 2012 - Psicose (short film)
- 2012 - Regret - Nuno Madeira Rodrigues (film)
- 2012 - Não há almoços grátis (short film)
