= Páginas da Vida (Portuguese TV series) =

- English poster for distribution
- Genre: Telenovela
- Created by: Sandra Santos; Alexandre Castro
- Based on: Páginas da Vida by Manoel Carlos
- Written by: António Barreira; Ana Lúcia Carvalho; Andreia Vicente Martins; Manuel Carneiro; Pedro Cavaleiro
- Directed by: Jorge Queiroga
- Starring: Sofia Alves; Maria João Bastos; Lourenço Ortigão; Júlia Palha; Tiago Teotónio Pereira; Paulo Rocha; Anabela Moreira; Filipe Vargas; Beatriz Godinho; Bárbara Branco
- Opening theme: "Wave" by Carminho
- Ending theme: "Wave" by Carminho
- Country of origin: Portugal
- Original language: Portuguese
- No. of seasons: 3

Production
- Production locations: SP Televisão studios; Rio de Janeiro, Brazil; Lisbon, Portugal
- Camera setup: Multi-camera
- Running time: ± 50 min.

Original release
- Network: SIC; OPTO; Prime Video
- Release: February 23, 2026 – present

Páginas da Vida (English title: Chapters of Life) is a Portuguese telenovela produced by SP Television in collaboration with TV Globo and broadcast by SIC, simultaneously on Prime Video. It premiered on 23 February 2026. The telenovela is written by Sandra Santos and Alexandre Castro with the collaboration of António Barreira, Ana Lúcia Carvalho, Andreia Vicente Martins, Manuel Carneiro and Pedro Cavaleiro. It stars Sofia Alves, Maria João Bastos, Lourenço Ortigão, Júlia Palha, Tiago Teotónio Pereira, Paulo Rocha, Anabela Moreira, Filipe Vargas and Beatriz Godinho. Bárbara Branco replaced Beatriz Godinho and joined the cast in the season 2.

== Telenovela overview ==
| Season | Episodes | Originally released | |
| Season | Episodes | First released | Last released |
|---|---|---|---|
| 1 | 90 | February 23, 2026 | June 26, 2026 |
| 2 | 75 | June 29, 2026 | October 9, 2026 |
| 3 | TBA | October 12, 2026 | TBA |

== Plot ==
While on a study abroad program in Rio de Janeiro, Brazil, Nanda meets Leo, with whom she falls madly in love, and the two experience moments of pure happiness until the day the young man has to return to Portugal at Eugénia's request, who insists on cutting off all contact between her son and the young woman. Shortly after, Nanda discovers she's pregnant with Leo's child, having never heard from him again, and doesn't have the courage to tell her family, especially her mother. Newlyweds Olívia and Sílvio, on their honeymoon in the Brazilian city, end up becoming Nanda's support as she, with her pregnancy advancing and no money, finds herself forced to return to Portugal. Marta rejects her daughter, but her father, Alex, and her brother Ricardo support her unconditionally. After a violent argument with her mother, Nanda ends up in a major accident and is taken, in critical condition, to the clinic where obstetrician Helena does everything to save both her and her babies... but the young woman ends up dying.

== Cast ==
=== Main ===
- Sofia Alves as Helena Varela
- Maria João Bastos as Marta Toledo Dias
- Lourenço Ortigão as Leonardo «Leo» Maia de Almeida
- Júlia Palha as Olívia Benedita Martins de Andrade
- Tiago Teotónio Pereira as Sílvio José Duarte
- Paulo Rocha as Gil Rodrigues
- Anabela Moreira as Eugénia Maia de Almeida
- Filipe Vargas as Alexandre «Alex» Dias
- Beatriz Godinho (season 1) and Bárbara Branco (seasons 2-3, guest season 1) as Constança Santos

=== Recurring ===
- Soraia Chaves as Carmen Martins de Andrade
- Margarida Vila-Nova as Ana Saraiva
  - Vila-Nova also plays Young Ana, with the AI feature
- João Reis as Diogo Carvalho
- Pepê Rapazote as José «Zé» Ribeiro
- Adriano Luz as Tomás Ataíde Martins de Andrade
- Mafalda Vilhena as Dolores da Silva Ribeiro
- Paula Lobo Antunes as Verónica Toledo Furtado
- Evandro Gomes as Salvador Varela
- Filipa Nascimento as Joana Fonseca
- Renato Godinho as Gabriel Vilaça
- Ana Varela as Lídia Ferreira Lebre
- João Vicente as Miguel Saraiva
- Filipa Pinto as Sandra da Silva Ribeiro
- Diogo Martins as Luís Maria Martins de Andrade
- Hélder Agapito as Vítor Dias
- Inês Sá Frias as Tânia da Silva Ribeiro
- Fernando Pires as Renato Lebre
- Carolina Amaral as Eva Tavares
- Joana Bernardo as Mariana Martins de Andrade Vilaça
- Beatriz Forjaz as Anabela Furtado
- Ivo Lucas as Domingos Lima
- Íris Runa as Gisele Saraiva
  - Mariana Costa as Young Gisele
- Margarida Moreira as Clara «Clarinha» Varela
- Martim Elias as Francisco «Kiko» Dias
- Martim Gomes as Dinis Martins de Andrade Duarte

=== Guest ===
- Madalena Almeida as Fernanda «Nanda» Toledo Dias
- Manuela Couto as Amália Martins de Andrade (season 1)
- Samuel Alves as Belmiro Furtado (season 1)

== Production ==
In April 2025, the pre-production for the telenovela began. A remake of Páginas da Vida (2006) was announced in August 2025, being the forth co-production between SIC and TV Globo, with the OPTO, the SIC streaming platform, and Prime Video additional broadcast.

After some failed attempts by Daniel Oliveira, SIC's program director, to make another telenovela collab with Globo's co-production, that dream only came true in June 2025 when both renewed their partnership, with more production of new remakes of historic Globo telenovelas being announced too. The initial plan would be to adapt Avenida Brasil, titled as Avenida Portugal, but due to lack of budget the channel had to choose to adapt the synopsis of other telenovelas, including Páginas da Vida, Vale Tudo, Rainha da Sucata and O Rei do Gado. The final choice was Páginas da Vida, with Sandra Santos and Alexandre Castro in charge of the adaptation. Avenida Portugal later became the network's choice to replace the adaptation.

Filming began on 27 October 2025 in SP Televisão studios, with outdoors in Lisbon. Filmings in Brazil took place in December 2025, including Júlia Palha, Lourenço Ortigão, Madalena Almeida and Tiago Teotónio Pereira. Filming wrapped on 24 June 2026.

Due to Beatriz Godinho's high-risk pregnancy and subsequent gestational loss, SIC decided to invite Bárbara Branco to replace the actress who plays Constança. The change happened at the end of the first season, when the character has a car accident that leaves her totally disfigured.

== Ratings ==
| Season | Episodes | First aired | | Last aired | | Avg. viewers (points) |
| Season | Episodes | Date | Viewers (points) | Date | Viewers (points) | Avg. viewers (points) |
|---|---|---|---|---|---|---|
| 1 | 90 | February 23, 2026 | 8.3 | June 27, 2026 | 5.5 | 7.1 (Note: Based on the audiometric results of the 90 episodes broadcast and revealed by GfK.) |
| 2 | 75 | June 29, 2026 | 7.0 | October 9, 2026 | 6.4 | 6.2 (Note: Based on the audiometric results of the 75 episodes broadcast and revealed by GfK.) |
| 3 | TBA | October 12, 2026 | 6.7 | TBA | TBD | TBD |

The first episode drew a 8.3 rating and 19.6% share, reaching 1 million and 279 000 viewers according to consolidated data from GfK, slightly raising the time rates and being the 2nd most watched program of the day. On 2 March 2026, drew an audience record with a 8.4 rating and 21.6% share. Later, on 16 April 2026, drew again a new record, reaching 8.5 / 22.3%. The first season last episode drew a 5.5 rating and 15.2% share.

The second season premiere drew a 7.0 rating and 18.0% share. A few days later, on 2 July 2026, drew a season audience record da temporada with 7.5 / 16.1%. In the next day, achieved its worst result ever with 5.5 / 15.7%. During the rest of July, it reached two new audience records, first with 7.0 / 18.5%, and later with 7.9 / 19.6%. On 22 September 2026, drew a new record, with 6.6 / 22.0%. The last episode of the second season ended with 6.4 / 20.8%.

The third season premiere drew a 6.7 rating and 22.6% share.
