= Zona J =

- Directed by: Leonel Vieira
- Written by: Rui Cardoso Martins; Luís Pedro Nunes
- Produced by: Tino Navarro
- Starring: Félix Fontoura; Núria Madruga; Ivo Canelas; Ana Bustorff; José Pedro Gomes; Sílvia Alberto
- Cinematography: Carles Gusi
- Edited by: Pedro Ribeiro
- Music by: Miguel Ângelo
- Distributed by: Filmes Lusomundo
- Release date: December 11, 1998
- Budget: 180,000,000 PTE

Zona J is a 1998 Portuguese film, directed by Leonel Vieira.

In 1999, it won 2 Globos de Ouro awards – an event organized by SIC, which was also one of the production companies behind the film.
