= Sofia Alves =

Portuguese actress

- Born: 25 September 1973 (age 53); Luanda, Angola
- Occupation: Actress
- Spouse: Celso Cleto

Sofia Alves (born 25 September 1973 in Luanda, Angola) is a Portuguese film, television and stage actress. She began her acting career as a stage actress and has since appeared in several Portuguese films and television programmes, mostly telenovelas. She currently stars as Hortense Monforte in the telenovella Remédio Santo.

== Biography ==
Born on September 25, 1973, in Luanda.

She is one of the most requested and most popular actresses on Portuguese television. At the end of 1992, having started her television career in A Banqueira do Povo and participating in series (Ballet Rose (1998) or Jornalistas (1999), she stood out as the protagonist of several telenovelas.

Some of the characters, in soap operas, that highlighted the actress were two protagonists that the actress brought to life, that is, Luísa Negrão and Leonor in Olhos de Água (TVI, 2000/2001), in which she played the two twin sisters. Also noteworthy are Joana Figueiredo, the character the actress portrayed in A Jóia de África (TVI, 2002); And the characters Margarida Monteiro in O Teu Olhar (TVI, 2003/2004), Sara Botelho in Fala-me de Amor (TVI, 2005/2006), Clara Machado da Câmara in Ilha dos Amores (TVI, 2007).

One of the milestones of her career was the character Hortense, in Remédio Santo (2011/12, TVI), where the public awarded her the TV7 Dias Trophy for Best Leading Actress in 2011.

Her last television project was in the telenovela "Mulheres", where she gave life to the character Mariana, a character that, in the words of the actress, was the most important of her career in television due to the density of the role and the strong dramatic load. Her demanding and versatile work has earned her the highest praise from critics and the public for her extraordinary performance and several nominations for best actress awards.

She has been married since 2007 to director Celso Cleto. She lives between Lapa do Lobo, in the municipality of Nelas, and Oeiras, where she carries out her professional activity.

== Television ==
Year	Project	Role	Notes	TV
1993	A Banqueira do Povo	Lena Moreira	Main cast	RTP1
1993 - 1994	Na Paz dos Anjos	Dora Maria Mota Costa	Main cast	RTP1
1994 - 1995	Desencontros	Ana Serpa	Main cast	RTP1
1995	Primeiro Amor	Catarina Matos	Special participation	RTP1
1996	Vidas de Sal	Mafalda Fragoso	Main cast	RTP1
1996 - 1997	Filhos do Vento	Lurdes	Main cast	RTP1
1998	Ballet Rose	Laura	Protagonist	RTP1
1998	Os Lobos	Sabrina Venâncio	Co-Protagonist	RTP1
1999	Jornalistas	Clara	Main cast	SIC
2000 - 2001	Conde de Abranhos	Virgínia Amado Abranhos	Main cast	RTP1
2001	Olhos de Água	Luísa Negrão	Protagonist	TVI
2001	Olhos de Água	Leonor Serra	Protagonist	TVI
2002	As Manhãs de Sofia	Herself	Presenter	TVI
2002 - 2003	A Joia de África	Joana Figueiredo	Protagonist	TVI
2003 - 2004	O Teu Olhar	Margarida Alves Monteiro	Protagonist	TVI
2006	Fala-me de Amor	Sara Botelho	Antagonist	TVI
2007	Ilha dos Amores	Clara Machado da Câmara	Protagonist	TVI
2008 - 2009	Flor do Mar	Ana Maria Torres	Protagonist	TVI
2010	37	Helena	Protagonist	TVI
2011	Sedução	herself	Special participation	TVI
2011 - 2012	Remédio Santo	Hortense Monforte	Main cast	TVI
2013 - 2014	Destinos Cruzados	Isadora Belmonte	Co-Antagonist	TVI
2014 - 2015	Mulheres	Mariana Fonseca	Protagonist	TVI
2016	Massa Fresca	Inês Castro Elias	Special participation	TVI
2021 - 2022	A Serra	Carlota Pereira Espinho	Antagonist	SIC
2022 - 2023	Sangue Oculto	Teresa Batista	Protagonist	SIC
2024 - 2025	A Promessa	Maria Rocha	Main cast	SIC
2026–present	Páginas da Vida	Helena Varela	Protagonist	SIC

== Theater ==
Year	Title	Ref.
1995	O Dia Seguinte	
2003	A Educação de Rita	
2005	Socorro! Estou grávida!	
2006	Crise dos 40...	
2008	Boa Noite Mãe	
2009	Hedda Gabler	
2013	A Casa do Fim da Linha	
2015	Uma Casa Perto da Praia	
2016	A Dama das Camélias	
2017 / 2020	Porta com Porta	
2018 / 2019	Freno de Mano	
2019	Mariana Alcoforado	
2020	A Loja de Ouvires	

== Cinema ==
Year	Title	Ref.
1993	Vale Abraão	
1994	A Caixa	
1996	Party	
1998	Piscar de Olhos	
2001	451 Forte	
2017	O Fim da Inocência	

== Awards and nominations ==
-Awards:

- Lux Magazine Award, Best Theater Actress 2006 (Ana, Help I'm Pregnant, staged by Celso Cleto);
- Trophies TV7 Dias 2011, Best Actress in a Series (Helena Bastos, 37, TVI);
- Lux Magazine Award "Feminine Personality 2011", Television/Fiction Category (Hortense Monforte, Remédio Santo, TVI)
- Trophies TV7 Dias 2012, Best Actress in a Soap Opera (Hortense Monforte, Remédio Santo, TVI)
- Trophies TV7 Dias 2013, Best Actress in a Soap Opera (Hortense Monforte, Remédio Santo, TVI)
- Female Personality Award in the Television Category (Fiction) Revista Lux, 2012
- Personality of the Year/Culture Distinction Award - Baile da Rosa, 2013
- Trophies TV7 Dias 2015, Best Actress in a Soap Opera (Mariana Fonseca-Mulheres TVI)
- tribute with his name on the Walk of Fame in Portugal, 2019

-Nominations:

- Golden Globes 2001, Best Actress of the Year in Television (Luísa/Leonor, Olhos de Água, TVI);
- Golden Globes 2002, Best Actress of the Year on Television (Luísa/Leonor, Olhos de Água, TVI);
- Golden Globes 2003, Best Actress of the Year on Television (Joana, Jóia de África, TVI);
- TV7 Dias Awards 2009, Best Actress in a Soap Opera (Ana Maria Torres, Flor do Mar, TVI)
- TV Awards Trophies TV7Dias 2013, Best Actress in a Leading Cast (Isadora Belmonte-destinations crossed TVI)
