= José Fonseca e Costa =

Portuguese film director

- Born: 27 June 1933; Caála, Portuguese Angola (present-day Angola)
- Died: 1 November 2015 (aged 82); Lisbon, Portugal
- Occupations: Film director, screenwriter
- Years active: 1964–2009
- Movement: Novo Cinema Português

José Fonseca e Costa, GCIH (27 June 1933 – 1 November 2015) was a Portuguese film director. He was one of the founders of the Portuguese Cinema Novo.

Born in Angola, Costa worked as an assistant to Michelangelo Antonioni before becoming one of the leaders of Portugal's 'Young Cinema' in the 1960s.

== Filmography ==
- Regresso à Terra do Sol - 1967
- A Cidade - 1967
- A Metafísica do Chocolate - 1967
- The Pearl of Atlantic - 1969
- Voar - 1970
- The Message (O Recado) - 1971
- The Guns and the People (As Armas e o Povo) - 1975
- The Ghosts of Alcacer-Kibir (Os Demónios de Alcácer Quibir) - 1977
- Quilas, the Bad of the Picture (Kilas, o Mau da Fita) - 1980
- Música, Moçambique! - 1980
- Kilas, o Mau da Fita - 1981
- No Trace of Sin (Sem Sombra de Pecado) - 1983
- Ballad of Dog Beach (Balada da Praia dos Cães) - 1987
- The Neighbor's Wife (Mulher do Próximo) - 1988
- Os Cornos de Cronos - 1991
- Five Days, Five Nights (Cinco Dias, Cinco Noites) - 1996
- The Fascination (O Fascínio) - 2003
- Widow and Rich and No Longer a Bitch (Viuva Rica Solteira Não Fica) - 2006
- What the Tourist Should See (Os Mistérios de Lisboa) - 2009
- Axilas - 2016

== Bibliographic references ==
- (in Portuguese) O Cais do Olhar by José de Matos-Cruz, Portuguese Cinematheque, 1999

== See also ==
- Cinema of Portugal
