= Five Days, Five Nights (1996 film) =

Cinco dias, cinco noites
- Directed by: José Fonseca e Costa
- Written by: José Fonseca e Costa
- Based on: Álvaro Cunhal
- Produced by: Paulo Branco
- Starring: Paulo Pires; Vítor Norte
- Cinematography: Affonso Beato
- Edited by: Jacques Witta
- Music by: António Pinho Vargas
- Release date: 25 April 1996
- Running time: 100 minutes
- Country: Portugal
- Language: Portuguese

Five Days, Five Nights (Portuguese: Cinco Dias, Cinco Noites) is a 1996 Portuguese film directed by José Fonseca e Costa, starring Paulo Pires and Vítor Norte. It is based on a novel written by Álvaro Cunhal under the pseudonym Manuel Tiago.

David Stratton of Variety wrote "A languidly paced escape adventure in which suspense potential is abandoned to focus on the relationship between a youthful escapee and his cynical guide, Five Days, Five Nights is a visually impressive but dramatically lightweight affair".

== Cast ==
- Paulo Pires as André
- Sinde Filipe as Friend
- Vítor Norte as Lambaça
- Mário Moutinho as Photographer
- Diana Costa e Silva as Girl in Bus (as Diana Tavares)
- Cucha Carvalheiro as Woman in Bus
- Laura Soveral as Sra. Conceição
- Teresa Roby as Júlia
- Miguel Guilherme as Acácio
- Joaquim Nicolau as Armando
- Rita Durão as Gracinda
- Canto e Castro as Old Man
- José Eduardo as Sergeant
- Ana Padrão as Zulmira
