= Generali Tranquilidade =

Portuguese insurance company

Generali Seguros, S.A.

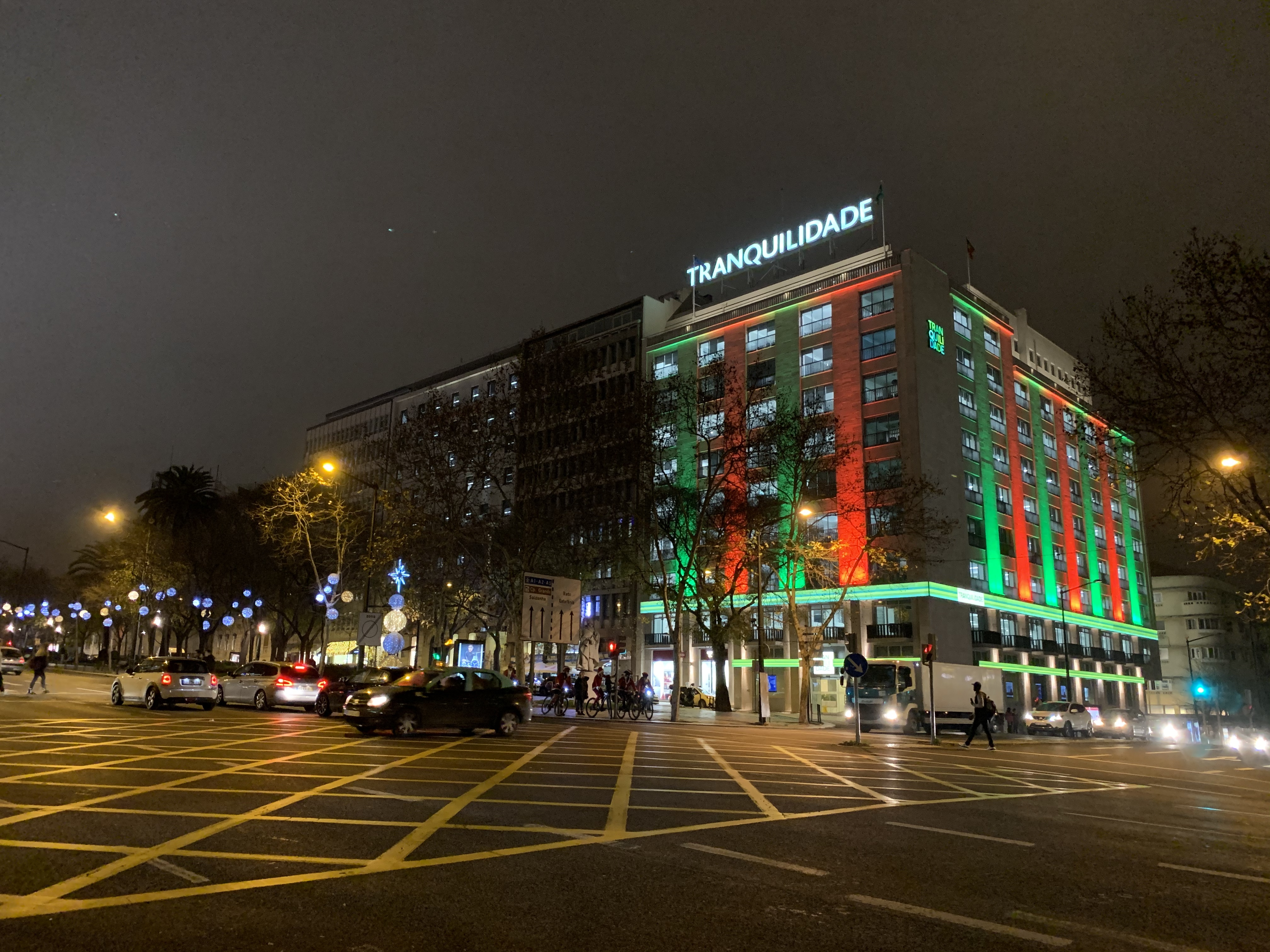
- Headquarters on Avenida da Liberdade, Lisbon
- Formerly: Tranquilidade
- Company type: Private company
- Industry: Insurance
- Founded: 1871; 155 years ago
- Headquarters: Lisbon, Portugal
- Products: Insurance
- Number of employees: 1114 (2020)
- Parent: Assicurazioni Generali
- Website: www.generalitranquilidade.pt

Generali Tranquilidade, formerly Tranquilidade, (Tranquility in English) is a Portuguese insurance company, founded in Porto in 1871. It is a subsidiary of Italian insurance group Generali Italia.

Is one of the largest non-life insurers in the Portuguese market with a comprehensive and specialized insurance offer for individuals and companies.

Through its life insurer subsidiary, T-Vida, it also offers life, retirement and financial solutions. It has close to 400 points of sale, among its own stores and agents and a vast network of agents throughout the country. Generali Tranquilidade has subsidiaries in several countries, such as Spain, Angola and Mozambique.

== History ==
Generali Tranquilidade was founded as Companhia de Seguros Tranquilidade Portuense – Companhia de Seguros contra Fogo in 1871. By 1935 it was under control of José Ribeiro Espírito Santo Silva, and would later become part of the Espírito Santo Group. After the 1974 Carnation Revolution in Portugal, the company was nationalized and merged with other insurance companies, and later reprivatised.

In 2015, in the aftermath of the demise of the Espírito Santo Group, it was sold to the Apollo Global Management fund for 215 million €. In 2016 Tranquildade acquired Açoreana Seguros.

In 2020 Apollo sold Tranquilidade to Italian group Generali for 600 million €. Subsequently, Generalli merged it with its business units in Portugal and Tranquilidade became a brand name of Generali Seguros, S.A.

Since 2024, Tranquilidade has been renamed Generali Tranquilidade, adopting the Generali brand image.

In 2024, Generali Tranquilidade has become the official insurer of the Portuguese National Teams. The partnership that the insurance company established with the Portuguese Football Federation includes the men's and women's National Football Teams, the Under-21 National Team and the men's and women's National Futsal and Beach Football Teams.

== Advertising campaigns ==
Since 2020, Generali Tranquilidade has been advertised by Portuguese actress Mariana Monteiro.
