= Núria Madruga =

Portuguese actress and model (born 1980)

- Born: 28 August 1980 (age 44); Vila Franca de Xira, Portugal
- Occupation(s): Actress and model
- Spouse: Vasco Silva
- Children: Salvador and Sebastião

Núria Madruga (born 28 August 1980) is a Portuguese actress and model.

She first appeared in cinema, in the movie Zona J, of Leonel Vieira (1998). Since then, she became popular with her works in television, participating in soap operas and series (2016/17 - A Impostora, 2012 - Doida Por Ti, 2007 - Ilha dos Amores, 2006 - Fala-me de Amor, 2005 - Dei-te Quase Tudo and Inspector Max, 2004 - Maré Alta and O Jogo, 2003 - Queridas Feras and Saber Amar). She returned to cinema in the movie Pele by Fernando Vendrell (2006), which is also her more recent feature.
