= The Miracle According to Salomé =

2004 film

The Miracle According to Salomé (Portuguese: O Milagre segundo Salomé) is a 2004 Portuguese film directed by Mário Barroso. It was Portugal's submission to the 77th Academy Awards for the Academy Award for Best Foreign Language Film, but was not accepted as a nominee.

== See also ==
- Cinema of Portugal
- List of submissions to the 77th Academy Awards for Best Foreign Language Film
