= Eduardo Viana (actor) =

Portuguese actor and opera singer (1955–2026)

- Born: 3 May 1955; Lisbon, Portugal
- Died: 17 October 2026 (aged 71)
- Occupations: Actor, opera singer
- Years active: 1979–2014

Eduardo Viana (3 May 1955 – 17 October 2026) was a Portuguese actor and opera singer. He appeared in over 50 films and television programs between 1979 and 2014, and was best known for playing Raul Pinto in the Portuguese television series Sentimentos.

Viana died on 17 October 2026, at the age of 71.
