= Rosa Lobato de Faria =

Portuguese actress and writer

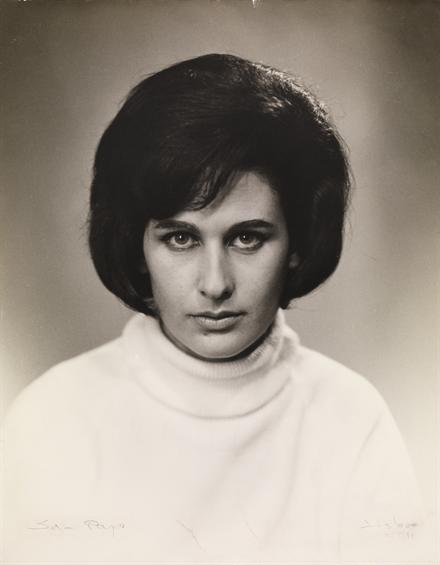

Rosa Lobato de Faria (née , Rosa Maria de Bettencourt Rodrigues Lobato de Faria; 20 April 1932 – 2 February 2010) was a Portuguese actress and writer whose career encompassed a variety of media including acting, scriptwriting, literature (novels and poetry) and songwriting. She was a respected figure in Portuguese cultural circles. She was married twice. Her first marriage, which produced three children, ended in divorce.

== Career ==
Lobato de Faria was born and Lisbon, and came to acting relatively late, with her first major credit in a 1982 TV series Vila Faia, which ran for 100 episodes. Between then and her last role in Aqui Não Há Quem Viva (2006–2008), she appeared in leading roles in many other television series including Humor de Perdição (1987), Nem o Pai Morre Nem a Gente Almoça (1990), Crónica do Tempo (1992), A Minha Sogra É uma Bruxa (2002), Só Gosto De Ti (2004) and Ninguém Como Tu (2005). She played in a variety of genres from straight drama to crime/thriller serials and comedy. Although her career was mainly television-based, she also appeared in a handful of films such as Paisagem Sem Barcos (1983) and O Vestido Cor de Fogo (1986).

Between 1988 and 1995 Lobato de Faria was a prolific scriptwriter for TV serials and telenovelas, being involved with twelve different programmes. She ceased her activity in this area when she turned to literature as her main form of creative expression.

Lobato de Faria published her first novel Os Pássaros de Seda in 1995. This was followed by eleven further titles, including O Prenúncio das Águas, which won Portugal's Prémio Máxima de Literatura award in 2000. Lobato de Faria published three children's stories, and also wrote poetry, with her work in that field collected in a 1997 volume Poemas Escolhidos e Dispersos.

Lobato de Faria was the lyricist for four Portuguese Eurovision Song Contest entries: "Amor d'água fresca" (1992), "Chamar a música" (1994), "Baunilha e chocolate" (1995) and "Antes do adeus" (1997).

== Death and legacy ==
Lobato de Faria died in hospital in Lisbon, aged 77, on 2 February 2010, from complications of anaemia.

Tributes paid to Lobato de Faria by notables such as Portuguese President Aníbal Cavaco Silva, Culture Minister Gabriela Canavilhas, and colleagues from the fields of television and literature recognised her contribution to Portuguese culture. Canavilhas said Lobato de Faria left a "legacy which is testament to her creativity and great sensibility and which will stand as an inspiration for future generations" while Luís Andrade, a former programme director for national broadcasting channel RTP, described her as "a great writer and a great actress. Portugal...is much the poorer for her unexpected death."

== Awards ==
- 2000, Portugal's Prémio Máxima de Literatura award

== Filmography ==
- 1996, Sur un air de mambo (TV movie)
