= Doce Fugitiva =

Portuguese television series

- Genre: Telenovela
- Starring: Rita Pereira; Rodrigo Menezes
- Country of origin: Portugal
- Original language: Portuguese
- No. of episodes: 282

Original release
- Network: TVI
- Release: October 24, 2006 – September 16, 2007

Related
- Deixa-me Amar

Doce Fugitiva is a Portuguese telenovela, broadcast in the channel TVI. It aired from October 24, 2006 to September 16, 2007. It is a remake of the 2002 Argentine telenovela Kachorra.

== Ratings ==
In its premiere, it was the highest rated of the day, with an average audience of 1.7 million, or 42.5%. of the viewing audience. It remained in the top places throughout its run.
