= Sofia Ribeiro =

Portuguese politician

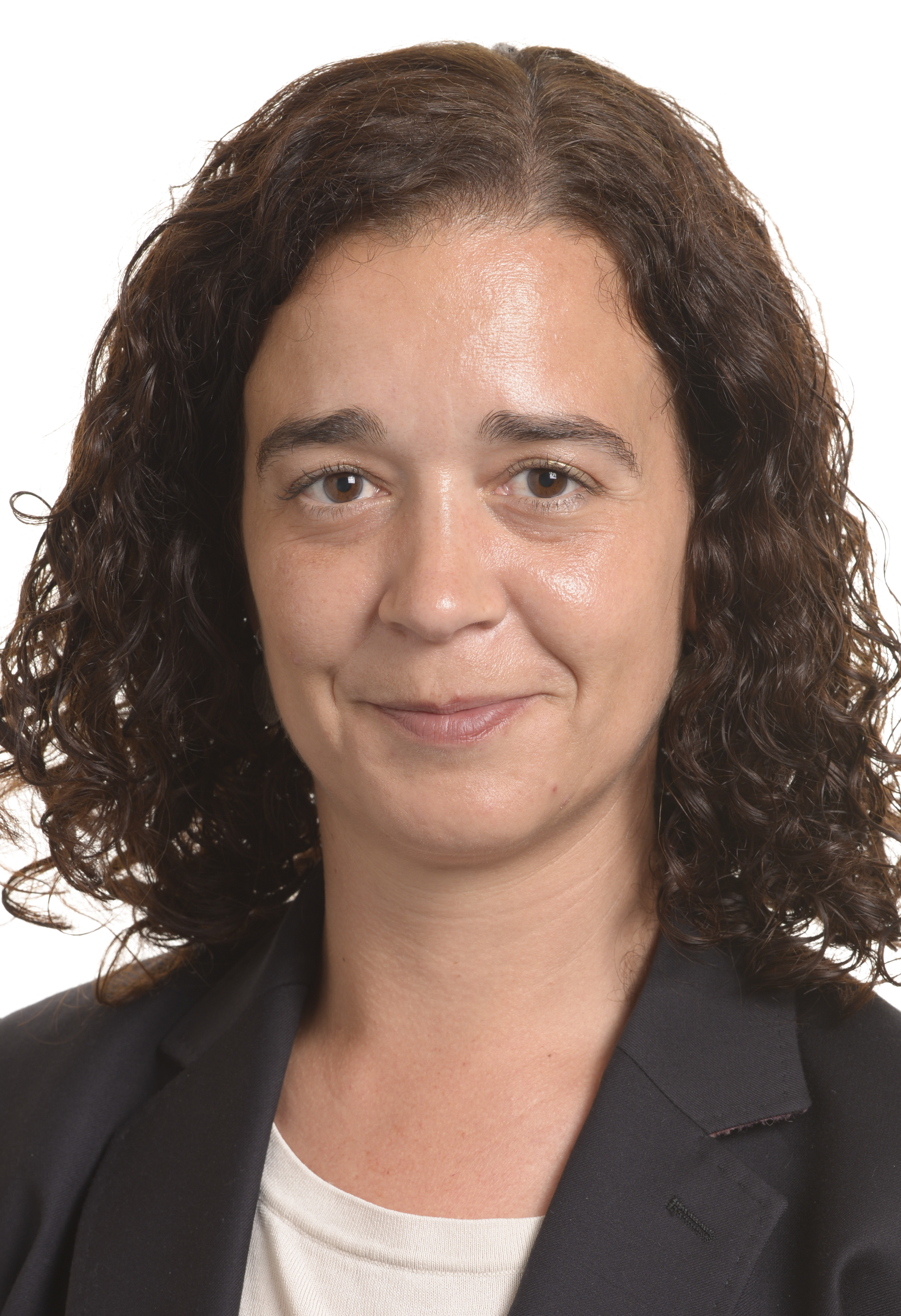
- Official portrait as an MEP, 2014

Member of the European Parliament
- In office 1 July 2014 – 1 July 2019
- Constituency: Portugal

Personal details
- Born: Sofia Heleno Santos Roque Ribeiro; 17 July 1976 (age 50) São José, Ponta Delgada, Portugal
- Party: PSD
- Education: University of the Azores

Sofia Heleno Santos Roque Ribeiro (born 17 July 1976) is a Portuguese teacher and politician of the Social Democratic Party (PSD) who served as a Member of the European Parliament from 2014 to 2019.

== Early career ==
Ribeiro graduated from the University of the Azores with a degree in mathematics in 2000, followed by a postgraduate degree in school administration in 2008. Since 2000, she has worked as a math teacher in the Azores. She was involved in the teachers' union of the Azores (Sindicato Democrático dos Professores dos Açores), from 2005 she gave up all her teaching activities for the union. From 2010 to February 2014, she chaired the union, at the same time she was also deputy chairman of the UGT trade union federation for the Azores.

== Member of the European Parliament ==
For the 2014 European elections, the Social Democratic Party nominated Ribeiro to third place on the list. The electoral alliance Portugal Alliance achieved 27.71% and thus seven places on the list. Sofia Ribeiro was next to Ricardo Serrão Santos as representative of the Azores in the European Parliament. The nomination of an Azorean for such a good place on the list - and thus a practically guaranteed choice - was received with surprise.
