= Rodrigo Menezes =

Brazilian footballer

Personal information
- Full name: Rodrigo Braga Menezes
- Date of birth: 9 August 1988 (age 38)
- Place of birth: Taguatinga, Federal District, Brazil
- Height: 1.87 m (6 ft 2 in)
- Position: Defensive midfielder

Team information
- Current team: Luziânia

Youth career
- 2008–2009: Fortaleza

Senior career*
Years	Team	Apps	(Gls)
2010–2011	Oeste	3	(0)
2011	Pelotas		
2012	J. Malucelli	0	(0)
2012	Sobradinho	6	(2)
2013	Comercial		
2014	Universitatea Cluj	2	(0)
2015	Galícia	0	(0)
2016	Noroeste	0	(0)
2016–2017	Luziânia	1	(0)
2018	Ceilandense	0	(0)
2019	Taguatinga	0	(0)
2019	Ceilandense	0	(0)
2020–	Luziânia	0	(0)
- * Club domestic league appearances and goals as of 10 July 2020

Rodrigo Braga Menezes (born 9 August 1988) is a Brazilian footballer who plays as a midfielder for Luziânia. In 2014 he had his only experience outside Brazil playing in Romania for Liga I club Universitatea Cluj.
