= Adriano Luz =

Portuguese actor

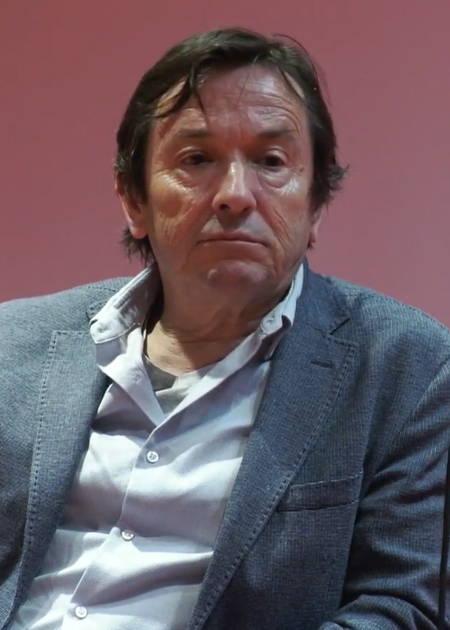
- Adriano Luz in 2019
- Born: 9 April 1959 (age 67); Porto, Portugal
- Occupation: Actor
- Years active: 1987–present
- Spouse: Carla de Sá
- Children: 2

Adriano Manuel Vieira da Luz (born 9 April 1959) is a Portuguese actor. He has appeared in more than 90 films since 1987.

== Selected filmography ==
Film
Year	Title	Role	Notes
2021	The Lone Wolf (Short Film)	Vítor Lobo	
2019	O Filme do Bruno Aleixo	Toninho	
2015	Arabian Nights	Luis	
2014	Os Maias		
2010	Mysteries of Lisbon	Father Dinis & Sabino Cabra & Sebastião de Melo	
2006	Blood Curse	Xavier Oliveira Monteiro	
2001	Get a Life	Adelino	
1998	Traffic	Hélio	

TV
Year	Title	Role	Notes
2011–2012	Remédio Santo	Armando Ferreira Borges	
2007–2008	Ilha dos Amores		
2024–2025	A Promessa	Joaquim «Quim» Pimenta	

== Dubbing ==
- The Lion King - Banzai
- Toy Story 3 - Lotso
- Sesame Street - Kermit the Frog
- Rurouni Kenshin - Sagara Sanosuke (Ep. 62-90)
- X-Men: The Animated Series - Beast, Magneto
- Alice in Wonderland - Cheshire Cat
- Avengers: Earth's Mightiest Heroes - Leader, Ultron, Iron Fist, Star-Lord
