= Manuela Couto =

Portuguese actress

- Born: 17 February 1964 (age 62); Setúbal, Portugal
- Occupation: Actress
- Years active: 1987–present
- Children: 2

Manuela Couto (born 17 February 1964 in Setúbal) is a Portuguese actress in television, cinema, and theatre.

== Filmography ==
=== Television ===
- Cacau da Ribeira (1987)
- Amor e Dedinhos de Pé (1991)
- Sozinhos em Casa (1993)
- Coitado do Jorge (1993)
- Senhores Doutores (1997)
- Fátima (1997)
- António, Rapaz de Lisboa (1999)
- Cruzamentos (1999)
- O Último Beijo (2002)
- Amanhecer (2002)
- Queridas Feras (2003)
- Ninguém Como Tu (2005)
- Coisa Ruim (2006)
- Tempo de Viver (2006)
- Ilha dos Amores (2007)
- Doida Por Ti (2012–2013) - Preciosa Antunes
- Belmonte (2013–14) - Sofia
- Santa Bárbara (2015–16) - Paula Montemor
- Ouro Verde (2017–18) - Armanda Nascimento
- Sangue Oculto (2022–23) - Remédios Brito
- Senhora do Mar (2024–25) - Luísa Cordeiro
- Páginas da Vida (2026–present) - Amália Martins de Andrade

=== Dubbing ===
- A Goofy Movie - Roxanne
- Alice in Wonderland - Red Queen
- Animaniacs - Dot Warner
- Braceface - Sharon
- Dave the Barbarian - Candy, Glimia, Dougmellon
- Digimon: The Movie - Sora, Yolei, Tai's mother
- Looney Tunes - Henery Hawk (1st voice)
- Madeline - Madeline
- Pinky and the Brain - Dot Warner
- Pocahontas - Pocahontas
- Shark Tale - Angie
- The Land Before Time - Littlefoot
- The Lion King II: Simba's Pride - Nala
- The Prince of Egypt - Zipporah
- Teen Titans - Starfire (season 1)
