= 1995 in Portugal =

- Decades: 1970s; 1980s; 1990s; 2000s; 2010s
- See also: History of Portugal; Timeline of Portuguese history; List of years in Portugal

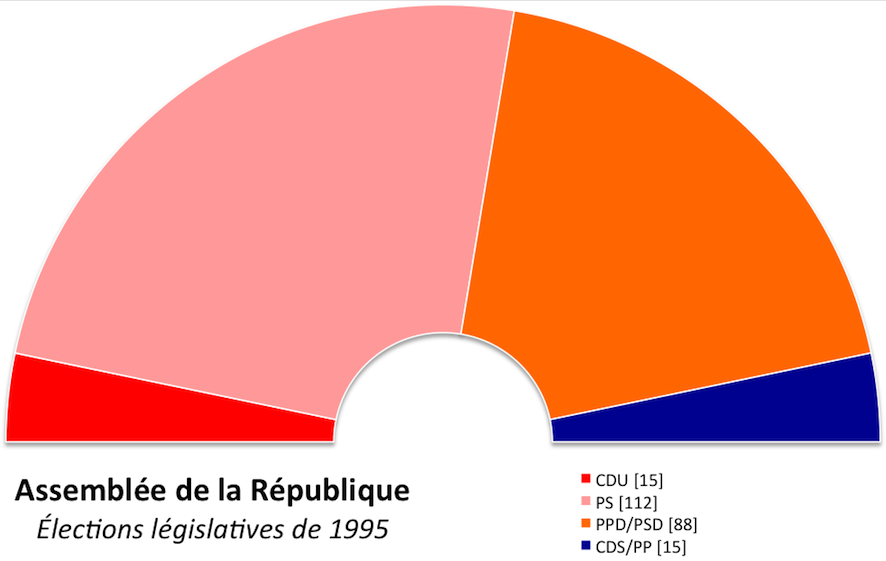
Political composition of the Assembly of the Portuguese Republic after the 1995 legislative elections.

Events in the year 1995 in Portugal.

== Incumbents ==
- President: Mário Soares
- Prime Minister: Aníbal Cavaco Silva (Social Democratic) (until 28 October); António Guterres (Socialist) (from 28 October)

== Events ==
- 1 October - Legislative election

== Arts and entertainment ==
Portugal participated in the Eurovision Song Contest 1995 with Tó Cruz and the song "Baunilha e chocolate".

=== Publications ===
- Blindness, by José Saramago

== Sports ==
In association football, for the first-tier league seasons, see 1994–95 Primeira Divisão and 1995–96 Primeira Divisão; for the cup seasons, see 1994–95 Taça de Portugal and 1995–96 Taça de Portugal; for the second-tier league seasons, see 1994–95 Segunda Divisão de Honra and 1995–96 Segunda Divisão de Honra; for the third-tier league seasons, see 1994–95 Segunda Divisão B and 1995–96 Segunda Divisão B; for the fourth-tier league seasons, see 1994–95 Terceira Divisão and 1995–96 Terceira Divisão.

- 14–19 March - Algarve Cup
- 3–10 April - Estoril Open
- 10 June - Taça de Portugal Final
- 23–30 July - FIBA Europe Under-16 Championship
- 6 and 23 August - Supertaça Cândido de Oliveira
- 24 September - Portuguese Grand Prix

== Births ==
- 4 January - Miguel Oliveira, motorcycle racer
- 6 January - Raphael Guzzo, footballer (born in Brazil)
- 11 January - Tiago Sá, footballer
- 26 January - Cristian Ponde, footballer
- 30 January - Tomás Podstawski, footballer
- 18 March - Frederico Ferreira Silva, tennis player
- 24 March - Núrio Fortuna, footballer
- 25 March - Ricardo Tavares, footballer
- 30 March - Ivo Tiago Santos Rodrigues, footballer
- 7 April - Mauro Riquicho, footballer
- 18 April - Francisco Geraldes, footballer
- 18 June - João Graça, footballer
- 18 June - Ricardo Santos, footballer
- 25 July - Luís Manuel Gonçalves Silva, footballer
- 30 July - Nélson Monte, footballer
- 25 September - Hugo Viveiros, footballer
- 21 October - Daniel Podence, footballer
- 31 October - Joana Valle Costa, tennis player
- 19 November - João Nunes (footballer, born 1995), Portuguese footballer
- 9 December - José Costa, a normal guy
- 15 December - Xéxé, footballer
- 28 December - Marcos Lopes, footballer

== Deaths ==
- 21 March - João de Freitas do Amaral, politician and journalist
- 14 April - António Lopes Ribeiro, film director
- 16 August - António Vilar, actor
- 8 November - Fernando Pinto Coelho Bello, competitive sailor
- 18 December - António Roquete, footballer
- Carlos Dias, fencer
- Maria Inês Ribeiro da Fonseca, painter
