= 1989 in Portugal =

- Decades: 1960s; 1970s; 1980s; 1990s; 2000s
- See also: History of Portugal; Timeline of Portuguese history; List of years in Portugal

Events in the year 1989 in Portugal.

== Incumbents ==
- President: Mário Soares
- Prime Minister: Aníbal Cavaco Silva (Social Democratic)

== Events ==
- 18 June - European Parliament election.
- 17 December - Local election.

== Arts and entertainment ==
Portugal participated in the Eurovision Song Contest 1989 with Da Vinci and the song "Conquistador".

== Sports ==
In association football, for the first-tier league seasons, see 1988–89 Primeira Divisão and 1989–90 Primeira Divisão.

== Births ==
- 29 January - Vasco Rocha, footballer
- 18 February - Marco António de Oliveira Quaresma Ferreira Alemão, robotics engineer
- 15 March - Adrien Silva, footballer
- 30 March - João Sousa, tennis player
- 31 March - Carlos Manuel Guedes Santos, footballer
- 28 December - Salvador Sobral, singer

== Deaths ==
- 31 January - Fernando Namora, writer and medical doctor. (born 1919)
- 2 February - Nuno Oliveira, equestrian, horse trainer and dressage instructor. (born 1925)
- 13 April - António Ferreira Gomes, Roman Catholic archbishop. (born 1906)
- 24 April - Santana, international footballer. (born 1936)
- 1 July - António Morais, football player and manager. (born 1934)
- 28 July - Patalino, footballer. (born 1922)
- 26 August - Jorge Franco, Olympic fencer (1952). (born 1923)
- 13 November - Eurico Caires, footballer. (born 1952)
