= 1992 in Portugal =

- Decades: 1970s; 1980s; 1990s; 2000s; 2010s
- See also: History of Portugal; Timeline of Portuguese history; List of years in Portugal

Events in the year 1992 in Portugal.

== Incumbents ==
- President: Mário Soares
- Prime Minister: Aníbal Cavaco Silva (Social Democratic)

== Events ==
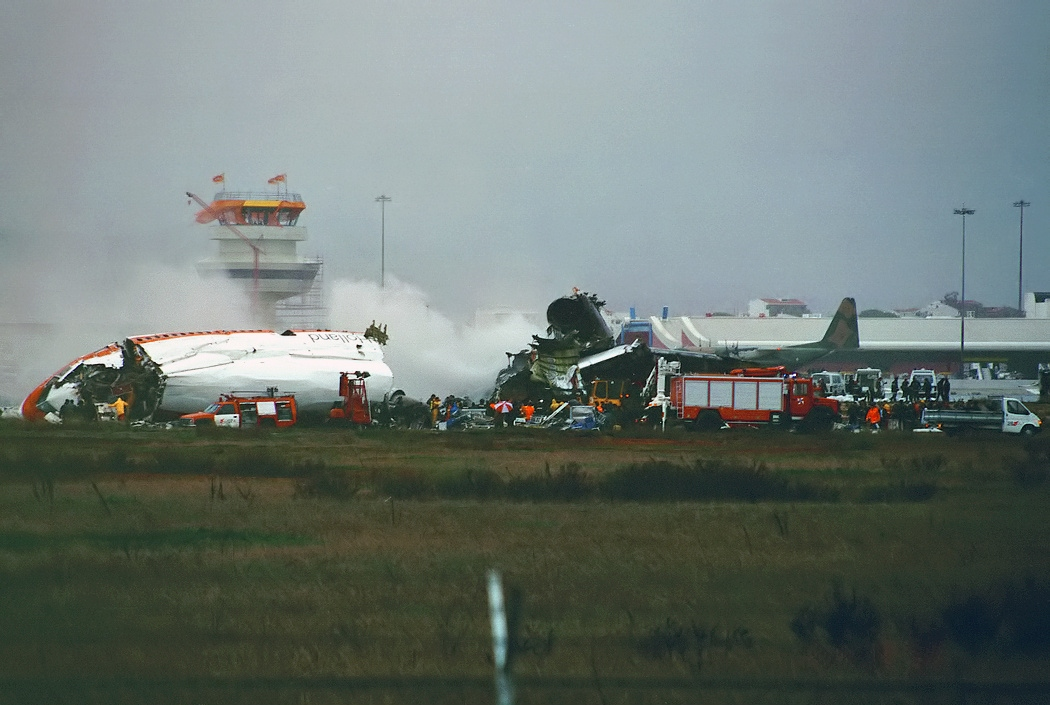
Wreckage of the Martinair Flight 495 at Faro Airport

- 23 May – Lisbon Protocol signed
- 21 December – Martinair Flight 495 accident, worst accident in the history of Faro Airport.

== Arts and entertainment ==
- 6 October – Sociedade Independente de Comunicação launched
- Portugal in the Eurovision Song Contest 1992

== Sports ==
- 1992 Portuguese Grand Prix
- Vitória Pico da Pedra founded

== Births ==
- 10 January – Mauro Antunes, footballer
- 11 February – João Carlos Nogueira Amorim, footballer
- 17 April – Filipe Daniel Mendes Barros, footballer
- 26 May – Leandro Albano, footballer
- 3 July – Vítor Hugo Silva Azevedo, footballer
- 26 July – João Filipe Amorim Gomes, footballer
- 6 October – Carlos Eduardo Ferreira Batista, footballer

== Deaths ==
- 25 October – Adelino da Palma Carlos, lawyer, scholar and politician (born 1905)
