= Filipe Gonçalves =

Portuguese footballer

Filípe Gonçalves
Personal information
- Full name: Filípe Miguel Maganinho dos Santos Gonçalves
- Date of birth: 12 August 1984 (age 42)
- Place of birth: Espinho, Portugal
- Height: 1.85 m (6 ft 1 in)
- Position: Midfielder

Team information
- Current team: Ovarense (manager)

Youth career
- 1993–2003: Espinho

Senior career*
Years	Team	Apps	(Gls)
2002–2004	Espinho	28	(5)
2004–2006	Braga B	40	(1)
2005–2008	Braga	9	(0)
2006–2007	→ Leixões (loan)	23	(4)
2007–2008	→ Vitória Setúbal (loan)	24	(1)
2008–2009	Paços Ferreira	11	(0)
2009–2011	Trofense	52	(9)
2011–2013	Moreirense	54	(4)
2013–2015	Estoril	43	(0)
2015–2016	Moreirense	26	(0)
2016–2017	Śląsk Wrocław	16	(2)
2017	Nacional	14	(0)
2017–2021	Oliveirense	104	(3)
2021–2022	Lusitânia	18	(0)
Total		462	(29)

International career
2005	Portugal U20	5	(0)

Managerial career
- 2022–2023: Lusitânia (youth)
- 2023–2024: Valadares Gaia
- 2024: Sanjoanense
- 2026–: Ovarense
- * Club domestic league appearances and goals

Filípe Miguel Maganinho dos Santos Gonçalves (born 12 August 1984) is a Portuguese former professional footballer who played as a midfielder. He is currently manager of Ovarense.

He made 154 Primeira Liga appearances, for Braga, Vitória de Setúbal, Paços de Ferreira, Moreirense, Estoril and Nacional, as well as 206 games in the second tier for four clubs. He retired in 2022 after one year at Lusitânia, and also had a brief spell abroad with Śląsk Wrocław in Poland's Ekstraklasa.

== Club career ==
Born in Espinho, Gonçalves spent the vast majority of his first four years as a senior in the third division, representing S.C. Espinho and S.C. Braga's reserves. Whilst at the service of the latter club he made his debut in the Primeira Liga with the main squad, playing 11 minutes in a 2–1 away win against Boavista F.C. on 7 May 2005.

Gonçalves alternated between the second and first tiers in the following years, appearing for Leixões SC, Vitória de Setúbal, C.D. Trofense and Moreirense FC. In the 2007–08 season, he contributed 34 official matches for Vitória, including six and one goal in the victorious run in the Taça da Liga.

On 27 May 2013, Gonçalves signed for G.D. Estoril Praia for two years. He made his competitive debut for them on 1 August, starting and playing 85 minutes in a 0–0 home draw against Hapoel Ramat Gan Givatayim F.C. in the third qualifying round of the UEFA Europa League.

After one season back at Moreirense, Gonçalves moved abroad for the first time, joining compatriot Alvarinho at Śląsk Wrocław in Poland. He scored in one of his first Ekstraklasa games, a 2–0 victory at Pogoń Szczecin on 1 August 2016.

In January 2017, Gonçalves rescinded his contract in Eastern Europe and returned to his country's top flight, on an 18-month deal at C.D. Nacional. Six months later, he dropped down a tier to sign for newly promoted U.D. Oliveirense for two years.

Gonçalves renewed with the team from Oliveira de Azeméis for one more year in June 2019, and he carried on playing until his release in 2021, just after relegation to the new Liga 3. In July, he and Ricardo Tavares moved to Lusitânia F.C. in the same league.

== Career statistics ==
As of 7 September 2015

Club	Season	League			National Cup		League Cup		Continental		Other		Total	
Club	Season	Division	Apps	Goals	Apps	Goals	Apps	Goals	Apps	Goals	Apps	Goals	Apps	Goals
Espinho	2002–03	Segunda Divisão	12	2	1	0	–	–	–	–	–	–	13	2
Espinho	2003–04	Segunda Divisão	16	3	2	0	–	–	–	–	–	–	18	3
Espinho	Total		28	5	3	0	–	–	–	–	–	–	31	5
Braga	2004–05	Primeira Liga	3	0	0	0	–	–	–	–	–	–	3	0
Braga	2005–06	Primeira Liga	6	0	1	0	–	–	–	–	–	–	7	0
Braga	Total		9	0	1	0	–	–	–	–	–	–	10	0
Leixões	2006–07	Segunda Liga	23	4	2	0	–	–	–	–	–	–	25	4
Vitória Setúbal	2007–08	Primeira Liga	24	1	4	0	6	1	–	–	–	–	34	2
Paços Ferreira	2008–09	Primeira Liga	11	0	1	0	4	0	–	–	–	–	16	0
Trofense	2009–10	Segunda Liga	27	5	1	0	6	1	–	–	–	–	34	6
Trofense	2010–11	Segunda Liga	25	4	1	0	2	0	–	–	–	–	28	4
Trofense	Total		52	9	2	0	8	1	–	–	–	–	62	10
Moreirense	2011–12	Segunda Liga	27	2	5	1	5	0	–	–	–	–	37	3
Moreirense	2012–13	Primeira Liga	27	2	1	0	3	0	–	–	–	–	31	2
Moreirense	Total		54	4	6	1	8	0	–	–	–	–	68	5
Estoril	2013–14	Primeira Liga	25	0	0	0	2	0	10	0	–	–	37	0
Estoril	2014–15	Primeira Liga	18	0	0	0	0	0	3	0	–	–	21	0
Estoril	Total		43	0	0	0	2	0	13	0	–	–	58	0
Moreirense	2015–16	Primeira Liga	3	0	0	0	0	0	–	–	–	–	3	0
Career total			247	23	19	1	27	2	13	0	–	–	321	26

== Honours ==
Espinho

- Segunda Divisão: 2003–04

Leixões

- Segunda Liga: 2006–07

Setúbal

- Taça da Liga: 2007–08
