= 1991 in Portugal =

- Decades: 1970s; 1980s; 1990s; 2000s; 2010s
- See also: History of Portugal; Timeline of Portuguese history; List of years in Portugal

Events in the year 1991 in Portugal.

== Incumbents ==
- President: Mário Soares
- Prime Minister: Aníbal Cavaco Silva (Social Democratic)

== Events ==
=== January ===
- 13 January – 1991 Portuguese presidential election: President Mário Soares (in office since 1986) is re-elected for a second term with more than 70% of the votes. He was supported by PS and PSD, the two major parties in Portugal.

=== March ===
- 7 March – Dulce Pontes wins the 1991 Festival RTP da Canção, with the song Lusitana paixão. Dulce Pontes thus became the representative of Portugal at the 1991 Eurovision Song Contest.
- 9 March – Mário Soares takes the oath of office for a second term as President of Portugal.

=== May ===
- 10–13 May – Pope John Paul II visits Portugal. The Pope visited Lisbon, Fátima, the Azores and Funchal.
- 31 May – Bicesse Accords are signed.

=== June ===
- 4 June – The Assembly of the Republic approves the 1990 Orthographic Agreement.
- 14 June – Opening of 1991 FIFA World Youth Championship. The tournament was hosted by Portugal and was played across 5 cities. Portugal U-20 team were the defending champions.
- 24 June – São João Bridge is opened.
- 30 June – Portugal wins the 1991 FIFA World Youth Championship, defeating Brazil in a final played at Estádio da Luz, in Lisbon. Portugal thus renewed the title they had conquered in the previous Championship, held in 1989. Many of the players of the victorious 1989 and 1991 youth squads (such as Luís Figo, Rui Costa and Fernando Couto) would later become the Golden Generation of the Portuguese senior team, a generation which would reach the semifinals of UEFA Euro 2000, the final of UEFA Euro 2004 and the semifinals of 2006 FIFA World Cup.

=== September ===
- 13 September – Lisbon–Oporto motorway is completed.

=== October ===
- 6 October - 1991 Portuguese legislative election: Led by Aníbal Cavaco Silva, the incumbent centre-right PSD wins an historical absolute majority, renewing the majority they had conquered in the 1987 election. Prime Minister Cavaco Silva (in office since 1985) is appointed for a third term in office.

== Arts and entertainment ==
Portugal participated in the Eurovision Song Contest 1991 with Dulce Pontes and the song "Lusitana paixão".

== Sports ==
In association football, for the first-tier league seasons, see 1990–91 Primeira Divisão and 1991–92 Primeira Divisão; for the cup seasons, see 1990–91 Taça de Portugal and 1991–92 Taça de Portugal

- 2 June - Taça de Portugal Final
- 14–30 June - FIFA World Youth Championship
- 22 September - Portuguese Grand Prix
- 1–4 November - European Acrobatics Championships

== Births ==
- 6 January - Duarte Alves, politician
- 29 January - Rafaël Dias, footballer
- 5 February - Irina Rodrigues, discus thrower
- 22 February - Joana Vasconcelos, sprint canoer
- 5 March - Ruizinho, footballer
- 20 April - Rui Caetano, footballer
- 7 May - Evandro Brandão, footballer (born in Angola)
- 16 May - Amido Baldé, footballer
- 27 May - Mário Rui, footballer
- 28 June - Tijane Reis, footballer (born in Guinea-Bissau)
- 29 June - Júlio Regufe Alves, footballer
- 1 July - Diogo Figueiras, footballer
- 7 July - César André Costa Dias, futsal player
- 21 July - Sara Sampaio, model
- 31 July - Filipa Azevedo, singer
- 7 August - Dolores Silva, footballer
- 8 August - Nélson Oliveira, footballer
- 31 August - António Félix da Costa, auto racing driver
- 9 September - Danilo Pereira, footballer
- 29 September - Pelé, footballer
- 5 October - Renato Santos, footballer
- 19 October - Flávio Ferreira, footballer
- 11 November - Salvador Agra, footballer
- 29 December - Lassana Camará, footballer

== Deaths ==
- 18 August - Luís Lindley Cintra, linguist
- 10 September - António Reis, filmmaker, poet, sculptor, ethnographer
