= 1985 in Portugal =

- Decades: 1960s; 1970s; 1980s; 1990s; 2000s
- See also: History of Portugal; Timeline of Portuguese history; List of years in Portugal

Events in the year 1985 in Portugal.

== Incumbents ==
- President: António Ramalho Eanes
- Prime Minister: Mário Soares (Socialist) (until 6 November); Aníbal Cavaco Silva (Social Democratic) (from 6 November)

== Events ==
- 2 February – Sopormetal, a company supplying brazing materials, silver and copper brazing solders, is founded.
- 11 September – Moimenta-Alcafache train crash
- 6 October – Portuguese legislative election, 1985

== Arts and entertainment ==
- Portugal in the Eurovision Song Contest 1985
- First occurrence of the Festroia International Film Festival

== Sports ==
- 21 April – 1985 Portuguese Grand Prix (Formula One)
- CD Rabo de Peixe founded
- Juve Lis founded

== Births ==
- 5 February – Cristiano Ronaldo, footballer.
- 24 March – Frederico Gil, tennis player

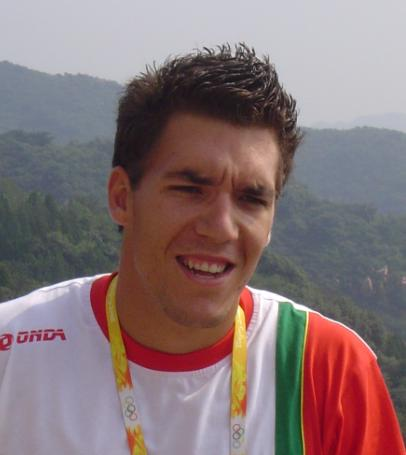
Emanuel Silva, world champion 2013, Olympic medalist 2012

- 25 May – Luciana Abreu, singer
- 31 August – Rolando, footballer
- 17 September – José Gonçalves, footballer
- 25 September – Vânia Fernandes, singer
- 11 November – Raquel Guerra, singer
- 8 December – Emanuel Silva, canoer.

== Deaths ==
- 7 May – Carlos Mota Pinto, law professor and politician (born 1936)
