= 1993 in Portugal =

- Decades: 1970s; 1980s; 1990s; 2000s; 2010s
- See also: History of Portugal; Timeline of Portuguese history; List of years in Portugal

Events in the year 1993 in Portugal.

== Incumbents ==
- President: Mário Soares
- Prime Minister: Aníbal Cavaco Silva (Social Democratic)

== Popular culture ==
For events in television, see 1993 in Portuguese television.

== Sport ==
- Establishment of the Campeonato Nacional de Futebol Feminino.

== Notable births ==
- 17 January - José Sá, association footballer
- 18 January - João Carlos Teixeira, footballer
- 19 January - João Mário, footballer
- 22 January - Alex Marques, footballer (died 2013)
- 26 February - Tiago Ilori, footballer
- 30 July - André Gomes, footballer
- 6 October - Ricardo Pereira, footballer
- 18 October - Ivan Cavaleiro, footballer
- 16 November - Nélson Semedo, Nélson Semedo
