= Ruizinho =

Ruizinho may refer to:

- Ruizinho (footballer, born 1989), Portuguese footballer who plays as a midfielder
- Ruizinho (footballer, born 1991), Portuguese footballer who plays as a forward
