= 1997 in Portugal =

- Centuries: 18th; 19th; 20th; 21st
- Decades: 1970s; 1980s; 1990s; 2000s; 2010s
- See also: List of years in Portugal

Events in the year 1997 in Portugal.

== Incumbents ==
- President: Jorge Sampaio
- Prime Minister: António Guterres (Socialist)

== Events ==
- 16 February – In an interview with Radio Renascença, Prime Minister António Guterres confirms that he will not support two separate bills introduced by the youth wing of the Socialist Party and the Communist Party to liberalise the existing abortion law, which are set to be debated in the Assembly later in the week.
- 26–27 February – A warm spell causes temperatures to rise to record levels, with weather stations in Aveiro and Viana do Castelo each observing a high 25°C on 26 and 27 February respectively, Portugal's highest ever winter temperatures.
- 16 April – Amarante massacre: Thirteen people are killed in the Meia Culpa nightclub in Amarante after three armed men lock patrons and employees inside and set fire to the building. José Queirós, the owner of a rival nightclub in Amarante, is later convicted of organising the attack and sentenced to twenty-five years in prison.
- 3 May – Portugal participates in the 1997 Eurovision Song Contest in Dublin with Célia Lawson performing the song "Antes do adeus". Lawson finishes the competition in last place out of the 24 competing nations, scoring zero points.
- 21 June – Foreign Minister Jaime Gama announces that fresh dialogue will be held with the Indonesian government over the future of East Timor, a former territory of the Portuguese Empire that was annexed by Indonesia in 1975.
- 8–10 August – The Festival do Sudoeste music festival is held for the first time in Zambujeira do Mar with American singer Marilyn Manson and English bands Blur and Suede performing as the headline acts.
- 31 October – Twenty-nine people are killed after heavy rainfall causes mudslides in the Azores. The storm system continues over the Atlantic Ocean and reaches mainland Portugal on 1 November, where further rainfall leads to flooding in Setúbal up to 3 feet (0.91 m) in depth and the collapse of a hospital roof in Lisbon, injuring two people.
- 5–6 November – Further heavy rainfall in Alentejo causes flooding along the banks of the Guadiana river at the Spanish-Portuguese border, killing ten people and severely damaging buildings in the town of Pomeral.

== Arts and entertainment ==
=== Publications ===
- Todos os Nomes (All the Names) by José Saramago.

=== Films ===
- Ossos (Bones) by Pedro Costa.
- Tentação (Temptation) by Joaquim Leitão.
- Viagem ao Principio do Mundo (Voyage to the Beginning of the World) by Manoel de Oliveira.

== Births ==
- 31 May – Inês Murta, tennis player.
- 19 November – Salomé Afonso, middle-distance runner.

== Deaths ==
- 13 June – Al Berto, poet (born 1948).
- 17 November – Orlando Ribeiro, geographer and historian (born 1911).
