= 1988 in Portugal =

- Decades: 1960s; 1970s; 1980s; 1990s; 2000s
- See also: History of Portugal; Timeline of Portuguese history; List of years in Portugal

Events in the year 1988 in Portugal.

== Incumbents ==
- President: Mário Soares
- Prime Minister: Aníbal Cavaco Silva (Social Democratic)

== Events ==
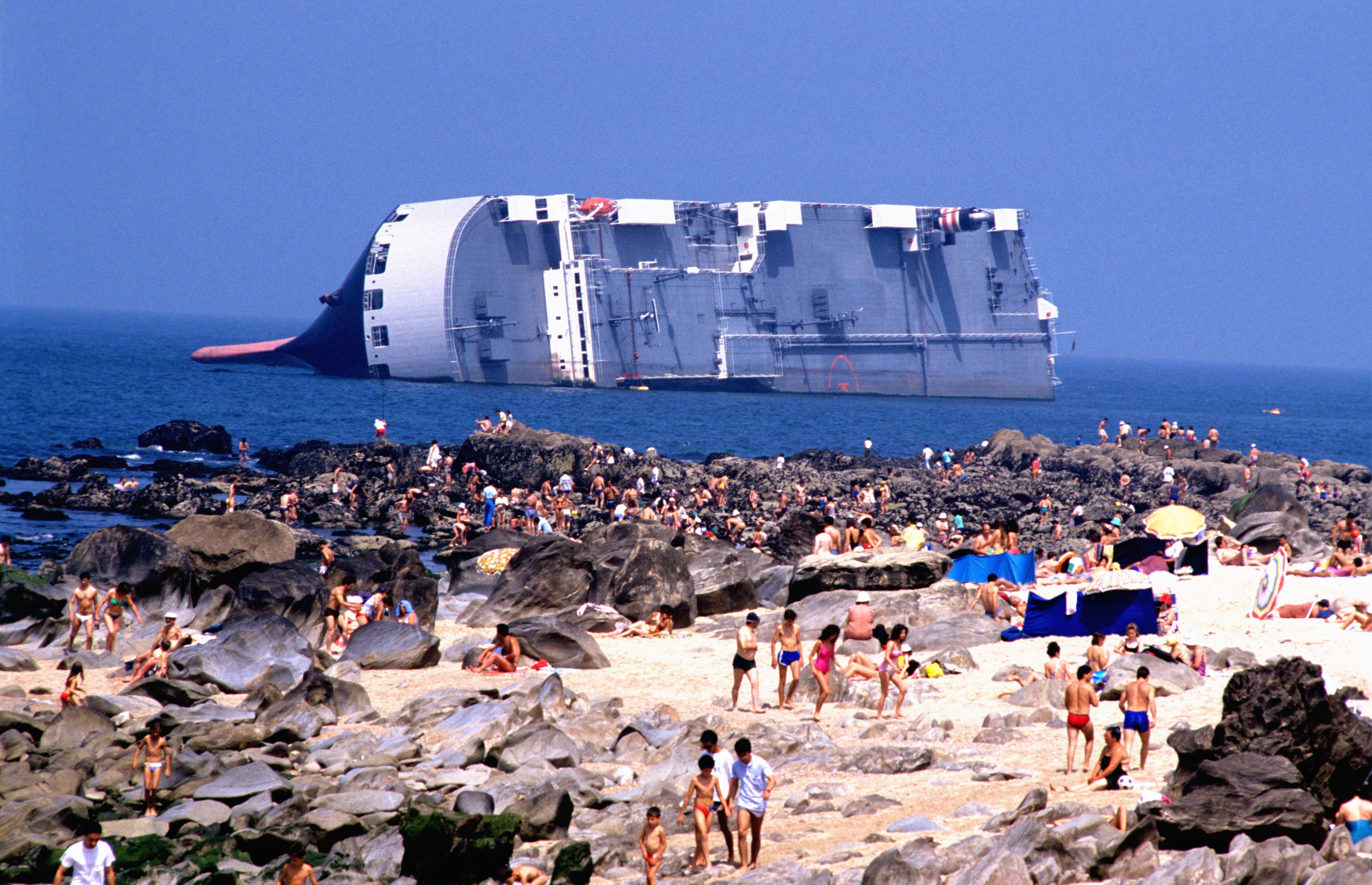
27 April: The Reijin (pictured in July 1988) capsizes off Porto.

- 27 April – The Panamanian cargo ship Reijin, carrying more than 5,000 vehicles at a total value of $100 million, runs aground off the coast of Porto, killing one person.
- 31 May – Malaysian officials announce the discovery of the Portuguese warship Flor De La Mar, which sank in the Strait of Malacca while en route to India in the early 16th century. The value of the treasure of gold and other rare metals from the Malacca Sultanate thought to be onboard is estimated at $3 billion.
- 1 August – A bus crash between Porto and São João da Madeira kills ten and injures 30 of the approximately 50 passengers on board.
- 25 August – A fire breaks out in the early morning at a department store in Lisbon's central Chiado district, destroying much of the area and leaving two people dead and 300 people without homes. The New York Times described the fire, the cost of which is estimated at $350 million, as the "worst disaster" to befall the city since the earthquake in 1755.
- 23 September – At the 1988 Summer Olympics held in Seoul, Rosa Mota wins gold medal in the women's marathon to become Portugal's first female Olympic champion.
- 25 September – In motor racing, France's Alain Prost wins the 1988 Portuguese Grand Prix held at the Circuito do Estoril.

== Births ==
- 1 January – Pedro Oliveira, Olympic swimmer (2008, 2012).
- 5 January – Yago Fernández, footballer.
- 26 March – Diogo Carvalho, Olympic swimmer (2008, 2012, 2016).
- 4 August – Carlos Almeida, Olympic swimmer (2008, 2012).
- 15 September – Nuno Roque, actor.
- 30 September – Bruno Filipe Lopes Correia, footballer.

== Deaths ==
- 21 May – Francisco Miguel Duarte, writer (b. 1907).
- 26 August – Carlos Paião, singer and songwriter (b. 1957).
