= Carlos Santos =

Carlos Santos may refer to:

- Carlos "Carlão" Santos (born 1976), 3-time World Brazilian jiu-jitsu heavyweight champion
- Carlos Santos (archer) (born 1940), Filipino Olympic archer
- Carlos Santos (boxer) (born 1955), former Olympic Puerto Rican boxer
- Carlos Alberto Santos, (born 1960) Brazilian footballer and manager
- Carlos Santos de Jesus (born 1985), Brazilian footballer
- Carlos Morales Santos (born 1968), Paraguayan footballer
- Carlos Santos (actor) (born 1978), Spanish actor
- Carlos Santos (comedian) (born 1986), Puerto Rican actor and comedian
- Carlos Santos (footballer, born 1989), Portuguese footballer

== See also ==
- Carles Santos (1940-2017), Spanish pianist and creative artist
