= 1996 in Portugal =

- Decades: 1970s; 1980s; 1990s; 2000s; 2010s
- See also: History of Portugal; Timeline of Portuguese history; List of years in Portugal

Events in the year 1996 in Portugal.

== Incumbents ==
- President: Mário Soares (until 9 March); Jorge Sampaio (from 9 March)
- Prime Minister: António Guterres (Socialist)

== Events ==
=== January to June ===
- 6 January – Two children aged 9 and 11 are killed after a three-story building collapses in Lisbon following weeks of heavy rain. Occupied by approximately 600 unauthorised squatters, the building was one of many older structures in the capital to be progressively weakened and fail from the ongoing inclement weather.
- 14 January – Presidential election: Jorge Sampaio of the Socialist Party is elected President of Portugal with 53.8% of the vote, defeating the Social Democratic candidate and former Prime Minister Aníbal Cavaco Silva. Following the Socialist Party's success in the parliamentary elections in 1995, Sampaio's victory marks the first time since the Carnation Revolution in 1974 that voters have elected both a President and a Prime Minister from the same political party.
- 24 January – Two Portuguese soldiers are killed alongside an Italian soldier after an accidental bomb explosion occurs at a barracks in the Bosnian capital of Sarajevo. Despite the deaths, which come as part of NATO peacekeeping efforts in Bosnia, both President Mario Soares and Prime Minister António Guterres re-iterate Portugal's involvement in the region.
- 9 March – Jorge Sampaio is sworn in as the new President of Portugal in a ceremony held in the Assembly of the Republic, replacing the outgoing Mário Soares after ten years in office.
- 18 May – Portugal participates in the 1996 Eurovision Song Contest in Oslo with singer Lúcia Moniz performing the song "O Meu Coração Não Tem Cor". Moniz finishes the competition in sixth position, the highest placing achieved by a Portuguese contestant until Salvador Sobral's victory in 2017.
- 4 June – The government and French automobile manufacturer Renault announce a deal which sees the government purchase a Renault-owned car assembly plant in Setúbal in exchange for the sale of government assets in Renault-owned ventures within the country. The deal ends three years of negotiation between the government and Renault over the Setúbal factory, which since 1993 has seen the loss of more than 450 jobs.
- 23 June – In association football, the Portuguese national team are eliminated from UEFA Euro 1996 after a 1–0 loss to the Czech Republic in the quarter-finals.

=== July to September ===
- 2 August – At the 1996 Summer Olympics held in Atlanta, Fernanda Ribeiro wins the women's 10,000-metre event in a new Olympic record time of 31 minutes 1.63 seconds, becoming the third Portuguese athlete to achieve an Olympic gold medal.
- 13 October:
  - Azorean regional election: The Socialist Party and the Social Democratic Party each win 24 seats in the Legislative Assembly of the Azores. The Socialist Party led by Carlos César subsequently forms a minority government with the support of the CDS – People's Party, ending two decades of Social Democratic governance.
  - Madeiran regional election: The Social Democratic Party achieves a majority in the Legislative Assembly of Madeira, winning 41 of the 59 available seats with 56.9% of the vote. The Socialist Party finishes as the second largest party in one of its strongest results in the Madeiran Assembly, securing thirteen seats with a vote share of 24.8%.
- 6 December – A series of events are held marking the 500th anniversary of the expulsion of Jews from Portugal by Manuel I. Speaking in the National Assembly, President Jorge Sampaio describes the 1496 expulsion as "iniquitous act with deep and disastrous consequences", and joins Dan Tichon, the Speaker of the Knesset in Israel, and leaders of the Portuguese Catholic Church in a session of prayers at the Lisbon Synagogue.

== Arts and entertainment ==
- 7 March – Portugal in the Eurovision Song Contest 1996 (Festival da Canção)
- 5 December – The cable television channel Canal Panda launched, then known as Panda Club.

== Sports ==
- 8-14 April – 1996 Estoril Open (tennis)
- 22 September – 1996 Portuguese Grand Prix (Formula One)
- Establishment of the Taça Nacional Sénior de Futsal Feminino.

== Births ==
- 25 March – Afonso, Prince of Beira, son of Duarte Pio, Duke of Braganza
- 5 September – Rui Oliveira, track cyclist
- 1 November – Daniela Melchior, actress
- 7 November – André Horta, footballer
- 29 November – Gonçalo Guedes, footballer
- 4 December – Diogo Jota, footballer (d. 2025)

== Deaths ==
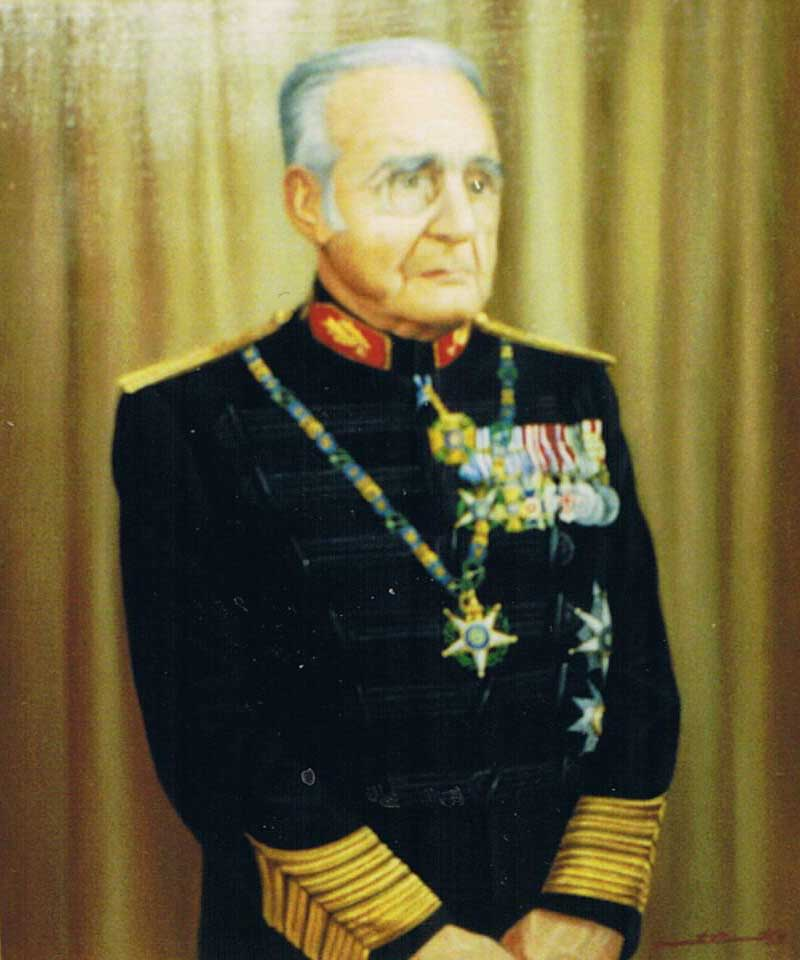
António de Spínola

- 1 March – Vergílio Ferreira, writer (born 1916).
- 1 April – Alfredo Nobre da Costa, engineer and politician, Prime Minister of Portugal (1978) (born 1923).
- 15 April – Beatriz Costa, actress (born 1907)
- 16 June – David Mourao-Ferreira, writer and poet (born 1927).
- 13 August – António de Spínola, military officer, politician and writer (born 1910).
