= 1990 in Portugal =

- Decades: 1970s; 1980s; 1990s; 2000s; 2010s
- See also: History of Portugal; Timeline of Portuguese history; List of years in Portugal

Events in the year 1990 in Portugal.

== Incumbents ==
- President: Mário Soares
- Prime Minister: Aníbal Cavaco Silva (Social Democratic)

== Events ==
- Establishment of the National Solidarity Party.

== Arts and entertainment ==
Portugal participated in the Eurovision Song Contest 1990, with Nucha and the song "Há sempre alguém".

== Sport ==
In association football, for the first-tier league seasons, see 1989–90 Primeira Divisão and 1990–91 Primeira Divisão; for the Taça de Portugal seasons, see 1989–90 Taça de Portugal and 1990–91 Taça de Portugal.

- 27 May and 3 June - Taça de Portugal Final

== Births ==
- 21 June – Isabel Pires, politician
- 14 July – Paulo Muacho, politician
