= 1986 in Portugal =

- Decades: 1960s; 1970s; 1980s; 1990s; 2000s
- See also: History of Portugal; Timeline of Portuguese history; List of years in Portugal

Events in the year 1986 in Portugal.

== Incumbents ==
- President: António Ramalho Eanes (until 9 March); Mário Soares (from 9 March)
- Prime Minister: Aníbal Cavaco Silva (Social Democratic)

== Events ==
- 1 January - Portugal becomes a member state of the European Union.
- 26 January - First round of the Presidential election.
- 16 February - Second round of the Presidential election.

== Arts and entertainment ==
Portugal participated in the Eurovision Song Contest 1986 with Dora and the song "Não sejas mau para mim".

== Sports ==
In association football, for the first-tier league seasons, see 1985–86 Primeira Divisão and 1986–87 Primeira Divisão.
