= CP Class 1960 =

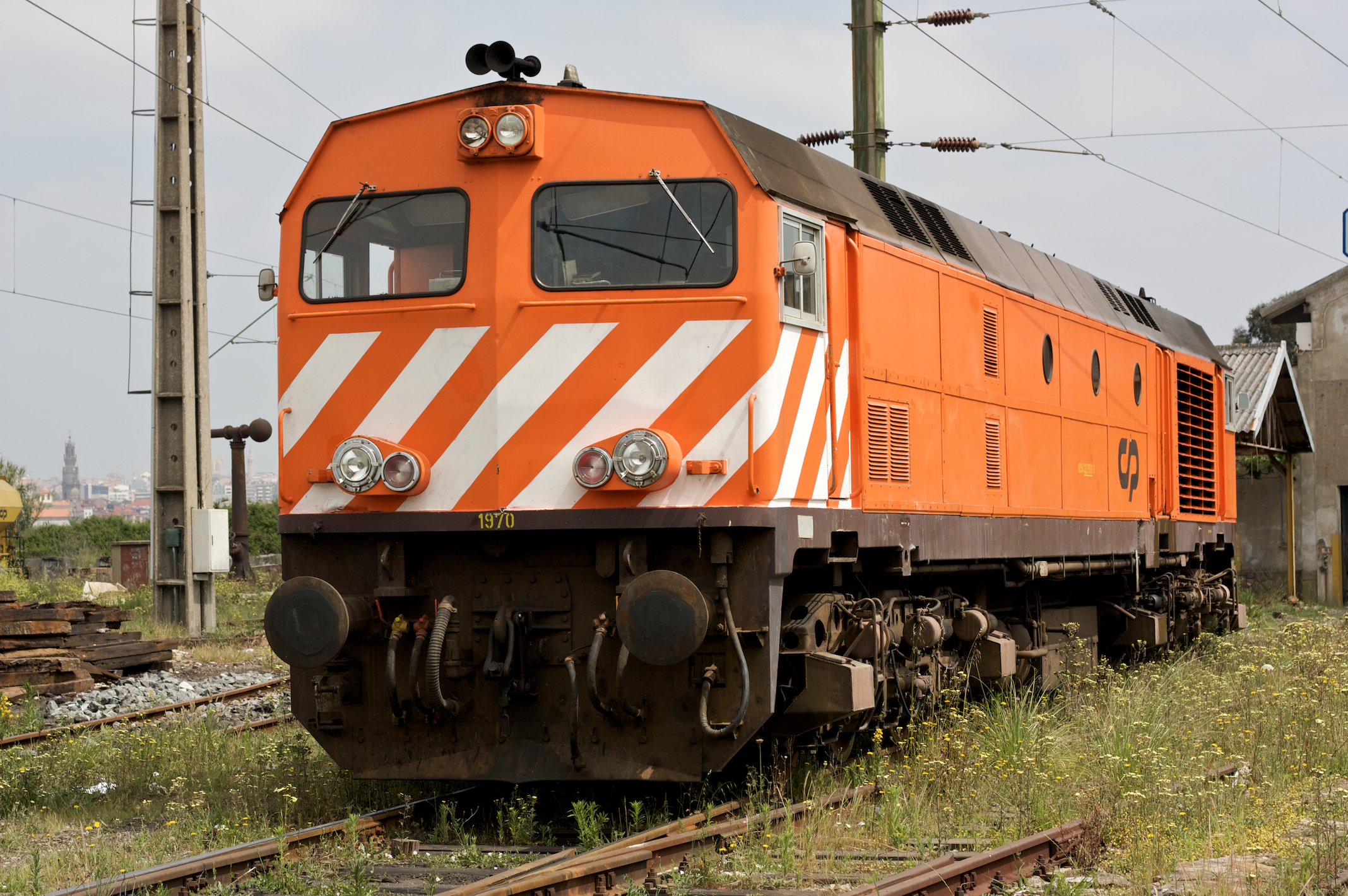
- Locomotive 1970, at Vila Nova de Gaia
Type and origin
- Power type: Diesel-electric
- Builder: Bombardier-MLW
- Build date: 1979
- Total produced: 13
Specifications
- Configuration
  - UIC: Co′Co′
- Gauge: 1,668 mm (5 ft 5 21/32 in) Iberian gauge
- Wheel diameter: 1,016 mm (40 in) (new)
- Loco weight: 121 t (119 long tons; 133 short tons)
- Prime mover: Bombardier 251/E
- Alternator: General Electric GTA-17 PC 1
- Traction motors: General Electric CGE-785 PA 1, 6 off
- MU working: Within own class only
- Train heating: Electric train heating
- Loco brake: Air
- Train brakes: Air
- Safety systems: Convel
Performance figures
- Maximum speed: 120 km/h (75 mph)
- Power output: Engine: 3,042 hp (2,268 kW) at rail: 2,250 hp (1,680 kW)
- Tractive effort: Maximum: 474 kN (107,000 lb_{f})
Career
- Operators: Comboios de Portugal
- Numbers: 1961-1973
- Disposition: 1 destroyed by accident, 7 withdrawn

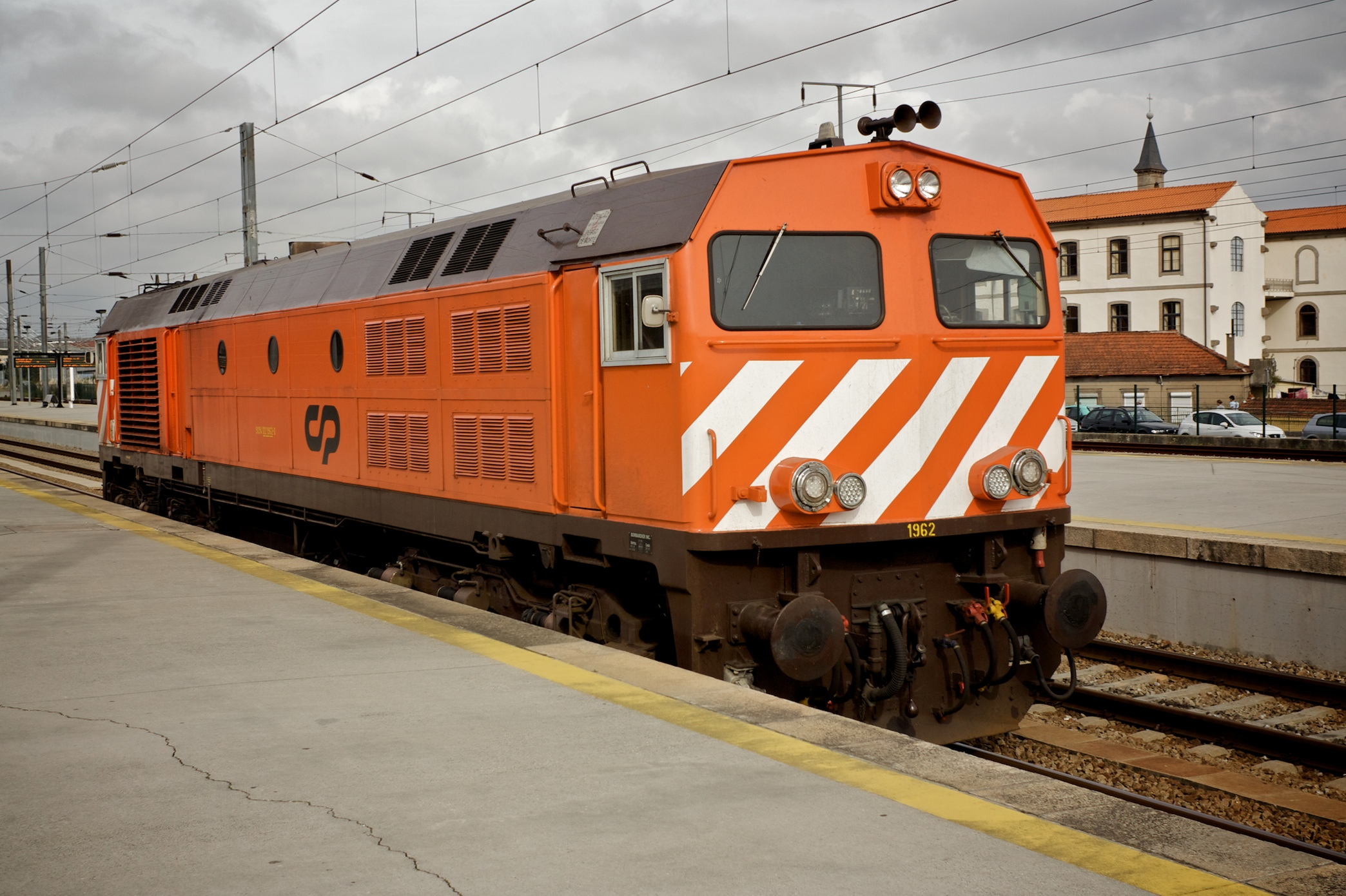
Locomotive 1962 at Campanhã station, Porto

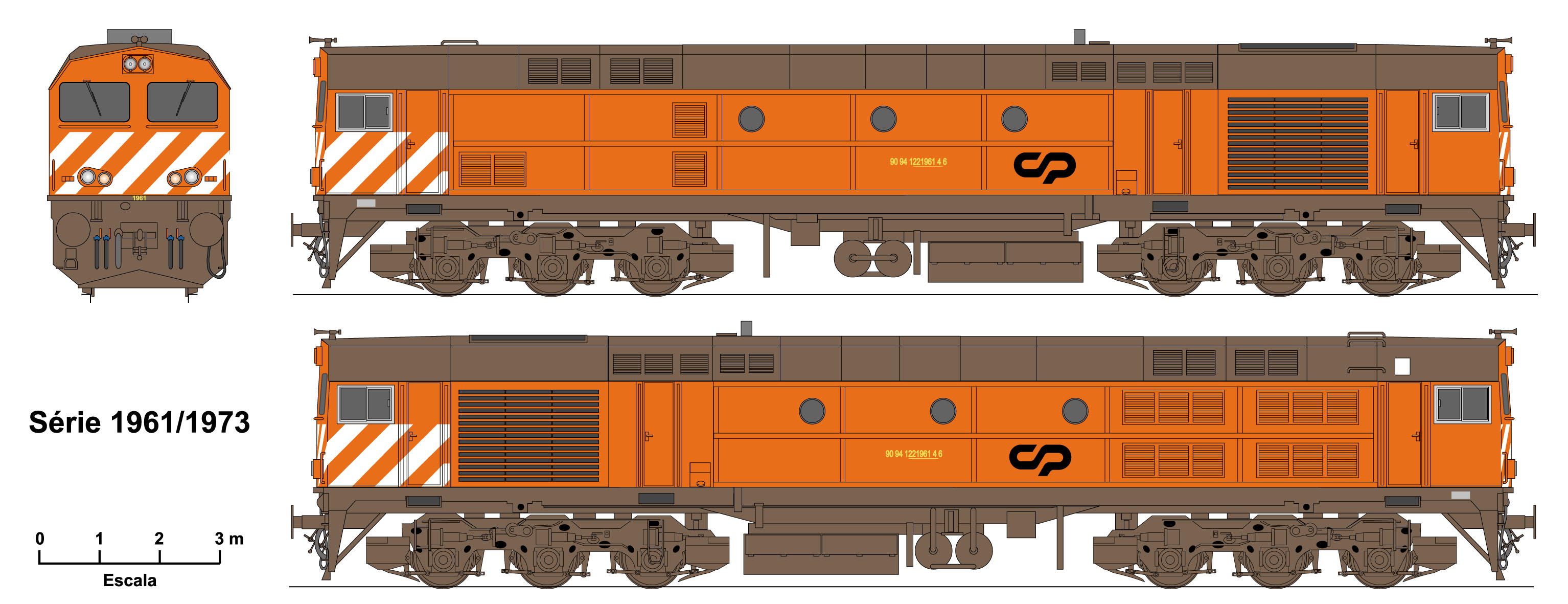

Série 1960 are a class of diesel-electric locomotives built for Portuguese Railways (CP). They were constructed by Bombardier Transportation and entered service in 1979. Of the 13 built, 5 remain in service in 2012. They have a top speed of 120 km/h and weigh 121 tonnes.

The locomotives were purchased for use on the steeply-graded Beira Alta line, with heavily loaded international services from Lisbon to Spain and France, including the "Sud Express". On 11 September 1985, locomotive 1961 was destroyed in an accident near Alcafache whilst operating the Lisbon-Paris international service. Officially, 56 people were listed at being killed in the accident. The Beira Alta line was electrified in 1996 and the Série 1960 locomotives were reassigned to freight duties.

The remaining locomotives are expected to be withdrawn during 2012, with high fuel consumption being a contributing factor.
