= 1994 in Portugal =

- Decades: 1970s; 1980s; 1990s; 2000s; 2010s
- See also: History of Portugal; Timeline of Portuguese history; List of years in Portugal

Events in the year 1994 in Portugal.

== Incumbents ==
- President: Mário Soares
- Prime Minister: Aníbal Cavaco Silva (Social Democratic)

== Events ==
- 12 June - European Parliament election.
- December 9 O Estranho Mundo de Jack on Portuguese Movie Theater

== Arts and entertainment ==
Portugal participated in the Eurovision Song Contest 1994 with Sara Tavares and the song "Chamar a música".

== Sports ==
Portugal participated in the 1994 Winter Olympics. In association football, for the first-tier league seasons, see 1993–94 Primeira Divisão and 1994–95 Primeira Divisão; for the cup seasons, see 1993–94 Taça de Portugal and 1994–95 Taça de Portugal.

- 3–12 June - European Men's Handball Championship
- 5 June - Taça de Portugal Final
- 20–24 July - World Junior Championships in Athletics
- 25 September - Portuguese Grand Prix
- 7–9 October - Trampoline World Championships

== Births ==
- 27 May - João Cancelo, footballer
- 10 August - Bernardo Silva, footballer
- 8 September - Bruno Fernandes. footballer
- 24 October - Bruma, footballer

== Deaths ==
- 7 February - Jorge Brum do Canto, film director, actor
