= 1987 in Portugal =

- Decades: 1960s; 1970s; 1980s; 1990s; 2000s
- See also: History of Portugal; Timeline of Portuguese history; List of years in Portugal

Events in the year 1987 in Portugal.

== Incumbents ==
- President: Mário Soares
- Prime Minister: Aníbal Cavaco Silva (Social Democratic)

== Events ==
- March – Joint Declaration on the Question of Macau
- 19 July – Portuguese legislative election, 1987

== Sports ==
- 20 September – 1987 Portuguese Grand Prix (Formula One race)

== Births ==
- 20 April – Jorge Pinto, politician
- 18 September – Luísa Sobral, singer

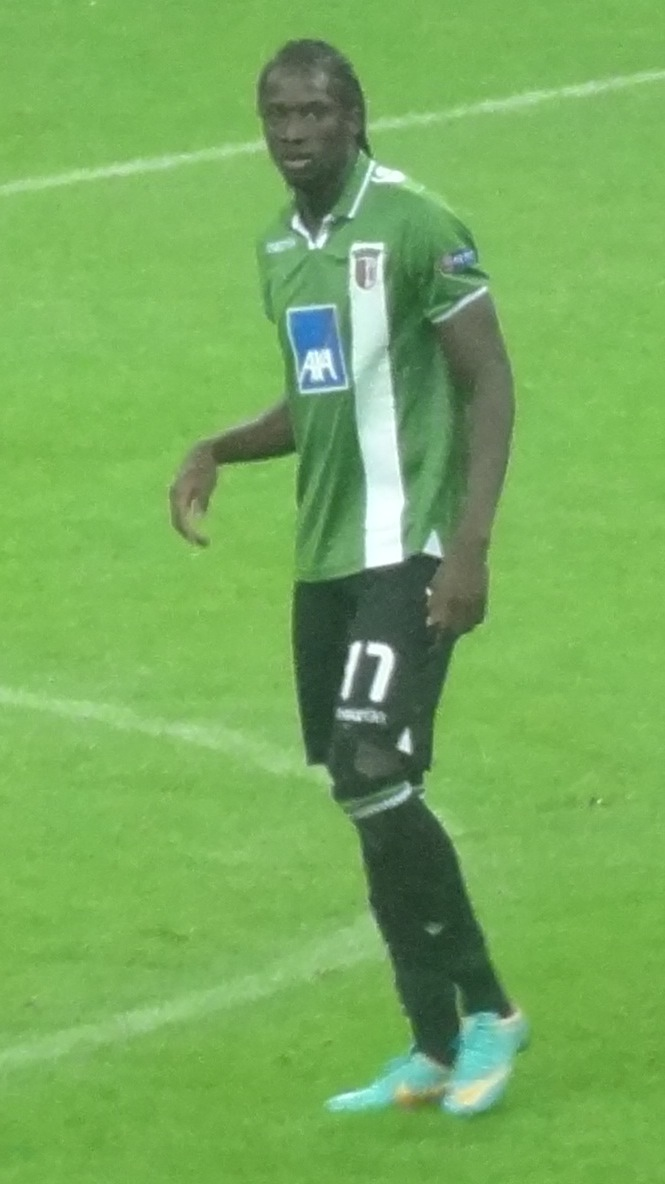
Éder

- 22 December – Éder, footballer

== Deaths ==
- 18 September – Américo Tomás, admiral and politician (born 1894).
