= Káká (Portuguese footballer) =

Portuguese footballer

Personal information
- Full name: Carlos Eduardo Ferreira Batista
- Date of birth: 6 October 1992 (age 34)
- Place of birth: Vizela, Portugal
- Height: 1.72 m (5 ft 8 in)
- Position: Left-back

Team information
- Current team: Académica
- Number: 15

Youth career
- 2002–2008: Vizela
- 2008–2011: Vitória Guimarães

Senior career*
Years	Team	Apps	(Gls)
2011–2013	Vitória Guimarães B	29	(0)
2011–2012	→ Limianos (loan)	17	(1)
2013–2014	Belenenses	1	(0)
2015	Marítimo B	18	(0)
2015–2016	Oliveirense	34	(0)
2016–2018	União Leiria	55	(2)
2018–2020	Vizela	34	(1)
2020	Olhanense	1	(0)
2020–2025	União Leiria	110	(5)
2025–	Académica	30	(1)

International career
2012	Portugal U21	1	(0)
- * Club domestic league appearances and goals as of 09:42, 5 August 2026 (UTC)

Carlos Eduardo Ferreira Batista (born 6 October 1992), known as Káká, is a Portuguese professional footballer who plays as a left-back for Liga Portugal 2 club Académica de Coimbra.

== Club career ==
Káká was born in Vizela, Braga District. He finished his development at Vitória de Guimarães, being loaned to third division club A.D. Os Limianos to start his senior career.

On 12 July 2013, Káká signed for C.F. Os Belenenses. He made his only Primeira Liga appearance on 22 December, playing the full 0–0 home draw against G.D. Estoril Praia in place of the habitual starter Filipe Ferreira.

From 2014 to 2016, Káká competed in the Liga Portugal 2, C.S. Marítimo B and U.D. Oliveirense. He subsequently returned to the third tier, firstly with U.D. Leiria; he remained in that league the following three seasons, in service of F.C. Vizela and S.C. Olhanense.

Returned to Leiria in October 2020, Káká renewed his contract in 2023 as they achieved second-division promotion, and again in 2024; at the time he was the squad member with the most competitive games, surpassing 150.

Káká missed two months of the 2023–24 campaign due to injury. He scored his only goal as a professional on 17 September 2023, in the 5–0 away win over his former side Belenenses.

== International career ==
Káká won his only cap for the Portugal under-21 team on 14 November 2012, as a late substitute in a 3–2 friendly victory over Scotland.
