= Mauro Riquicho =

Portuguese footballer

Personal information
- Full name: Mauro Alves Riquicho
- Date of birth: 7 April 1995 (age 31)
- Place of birth: Cascais, Portugal
- Height: 1.73 m (5 ft 8 in)
- Position: Right-back

Youth career
- 2006–2007: Fontainhas
- 2007–2013: Sporting CP

Senior career*
| Years | Team | Apps | (Gls) |
| 2013–2019 | Sporting CP B | 90 | (1) |
| 2019 | → Louletano (loan) | 0 | (0) |
| Total | | 90 | (1) |

International career
| 2012 | Portugal U17 | 2 | (0) |
| 2013 | Portugal U18 | 2 | (0) |
| 2013–2014 | Portugal U19 | 9 | (0) |
| 2015 | Portugal U20 | 9 | (0) |
| 2015 | Portugal U21 | 1 | (0) |
- * Club domestic league appearances and goals

Mauro Alves Riquicho (born 7 April 1995) is a Portuguese former professional footballer who played as a right-back.

== Club career ==
Born in Cascais, Lisbon District of Mozambican descent, Riquicho joined Sporting CP's youth system at the age of 12. On 27 April 2013, still a junior, he made his professional debut with the B team, playing the full 90 minutes in a 1–1 away draw against C.D. Aves in the Segunda Liga.

Riquicho scored his only goal in the competition on 11 December 2013, but in a 3–1 away loss to S.L. Benfica B. He went on to have a long spell on the sidelines, due to a fracture to his left fibula.

Riquicho retired in 2019 aged only 24, following an unassuming loan at third division club Louletano DC.

== International career ==
Riquicho represented Portugal at the 2015 FIFA U-20 World Cup. He played all matches in New Zealand, helping his country to reach the quarter-finals.

On 8 September 2015, Riquicho won his only cap for the under-21 team, starting and finishing the 6–1 away rout of Albania in the 2017 UEFA European Championship qualifiers.

== Post-retirement ==
After retiring, Riquicho began practicing Brazilian jiu-jitsu. In his first three years in the sport, he won a national championship and a silver medal at the 2025 World IBJJF Jiu-Jitsu Championship.
