= Moimenta-Alcafache train crash =

1985 train wreck in Mangualde, Portugal

Details
- Date: 11 September 1985; 18:37 WEST (UTC+01:00)
- Location: Moimenta de Maceira Dão, Mangualde, Viseu
- Coordinates: 40°33′42″N 7°49′14″W
- Country: Portugal
- Line: Linha da Beira Alta
- Operator: Caminhos-de-Ferro Portugueses
- Incident type: Collision
- Cause: Human Error

Statistics
- Trains: 2
- Passengers: 460
- Deaths: 49 (official); 50–150 (unofficial estimates)
Linha da Beira Alta route map (in 1985)

The Moimenta-Alcafache train crash (Portuguese pronunciation: [mojˈmẽtɐ ˌalkɐˈfaʃɨ]) occurred on 11 September 1985 in Mangualde, Portugal, in the Portuguese Linha da Beira Alta. It killed about 150 people, making it the worst rail disaster in Portuguese history.

== Context ==
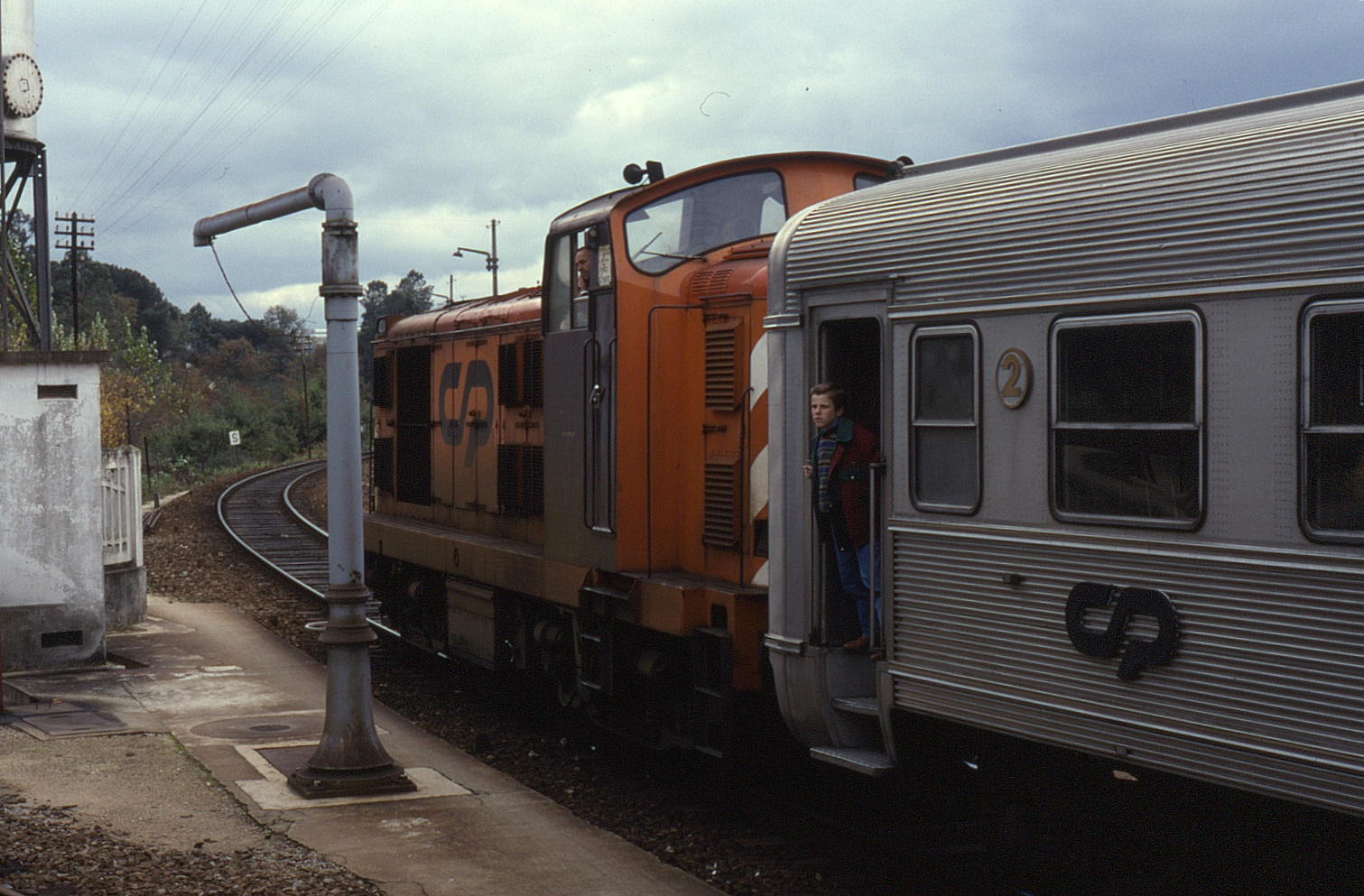
A CP Class 1400 locomotive and a Sorefame carriage, both similar to the ones that formed the Regional train involved in the crash.

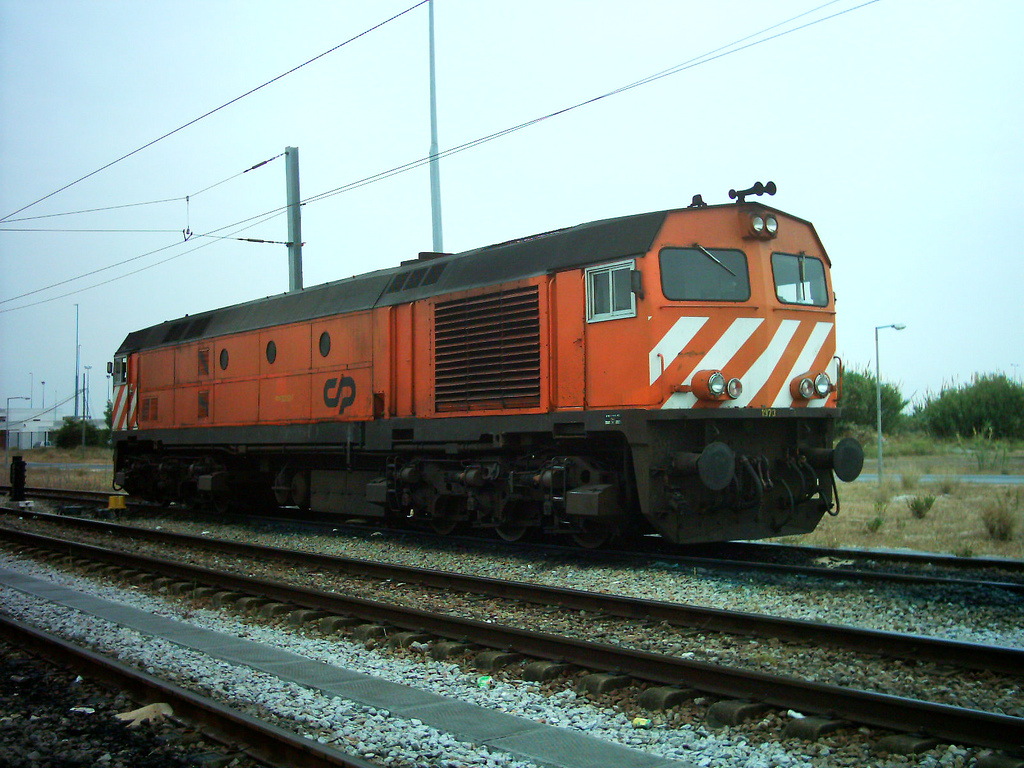
A CP Class 1960 locomotive, similar to the one that hauled the international train involved in the crash.

The accident happened near the Moimenta-Alcafache station, in Moimenta de Maceira Dão parish, Mangualde municipality. This station is between the Nelas and Mangualde stations, in a single track zone.

The crash involved two passenger trains. One was operating an international service between Porto and Paris, and was running 18 minutes behind schedule; the other one was on a regional service, heading for Coimbra. The regional train was composed of locomotive 1439, from the CP Class 1400 of Comboios de Portugal, and by 6 or 7 carriages, built by the Sorefame company; the Sud Express (international service) was made up of locomotive CP Class 1960 1961 and about 12 carriages. In total, about 460 passengers were aboard the two trains.

== Crash ==
The regional service, which was stopping at all stations, arrived at Mangualde station, where it was supposed to stay until the international train had passed. However, notwithstanding the fact that the international service train had standing orders giving it the right of way, the regional continued on, estimating that the delay in the international's service would be enough for the regional to get to Nelas station, where the crossing could be effected. However, the international service was running with a shorter delay than expected; wrongly considering that the line was open to Mangualde station, it also moved on. After the departure, the Nelas stationmaster phoned Moimenta-Alcafache waystation to warn them about the international service departure, and was then informed of the oncoming regional train. Foreseeing that the trains would collide, he tried to warn the guardsman on a level crossing between both stations by holding a banner or placing petards on the line; however, this action was not possible, as the train had already passed.

Around 18:37, the trains collided, while traveling approximately 100 km/h (62 mph) each. The shock destroyed both locomotives and some cars in both trains, and ignited several gasoline-fueled fires. Due to the fact that the materials used in the carriages were not fireproof, the fire spread quickly, producing great amounts of smoke.

Immediately after the crash, panic spread among the passengers, who were frantically trying to get out of the carriages. Many people, among them children, got out of the wreckage, having been helped by other passengers; others burned to death, or were asphyxiated by smoke and fumes.

== Rescue and aftermath ==
The alert was given by military personnel of the Portuguese Guarda Nacional Republicana (National Republican Guard), who were operating on EN234, near the crash site. Although the rescue services arrived only a few minutes after the accident, the situation there was chaotic, with fires on the trains and forest around, many people hurt, and several passengers in panic.

It is estimated that some 150 people perished, though the circumstances of the crash and the lack of control of the number of passengers in both services prevent an exact count of the number of victims. The official estimate points to 49 dead, from which only 14 were identified, while 64 passengers remain officially missing.

Most of the remains that were not identified were buried in a common trench near the crash site, which was converted to a memorial remembering the victims and the rescue teams.

== Accident investigation ==
It was revealed that neither stationmaster communicated with each other, nor to the control station in Coimbra, as regulated, to tell them about the change of the crossing from Mangualde to Nelas; had this been done, the danger would have been noticed, and one of the trains would have stayed at the station, so that the crossing could be made safely.

Contributing to the disaster, due to the lack of equipment, it was impossible to communicate with the involved trains; the only way to warn drivers was through signaling, and installing petards on the line, which, in this case, failed to stop the trains. The communication system used at the time on that part of the route depended upon the use of phones to give information between passenger stations and the control station.

In the wake of the disaster, more advanced safety, signaling and traffic control systems were installed, such as Speed Control, increasing operational safety, and decreasing the chance of a similar crash in the future. In addition, the installation of ground-radio systems allowed a direct communication between drivers and control stations, and the use of materials that ease the propagation of flames was forbidden on trains.

== Chronology ==
- September 11
  - 15:57: International train number 315, named Sud Express, departs from Porto-Campanhã station, 17 minutes behind schedule, towards Vilar Formoso, from where it will proceed to Spain and France.
  - 16:55: Regional train number 1324 departs, on schedule, Guarda station, bound for Coimbra.
  - 18:19: Time at which the international service was due to arrive at Nelas station; however, it arrives with a slight delay, having been able to make up some time lost in the departure from Porto during the journey.
  - 18:23: The regional service arrives at Mangualde station, on or close on time. Here, in normal circumstances, it should have waited for train 315; however, it proceeds toward Alcafache station, to where it intends to meet the crossing train.
  - 18:31: Time at which the international service was due to arrive at Mangualde station.
  - 18:34: Time at which the regional service was due to arrive at Alcafache station, had the crossing taken place at Mangualde, as usual. It proceeds, for the crossing was changed again to Nelas station.
  - 18:37: The collision between both trains takes place, between the current Moimenta-Alcafache way station and the Nelas station.
  - 18:41: Time at which the regional service was due to arrive at Nelas station.
- September 13
  - 16:30: The burial of unidentified remains takes place in the Cemetery of Mangualde, under orders from the Portuguese Ministry of Justice.
- September 14
  - The removal of the last human remains and the cleanup of the site are concluded.
- September 16
  - Rail traffic is resumed at the crash location. A provisional toll of the disaster is published in the newspaper Correio da Manhã (Morning Mail): 8 dead, 170 injured, 110 unharmed survivors and 64 missing.
- September 18
  - The first international service after the crash passes on this part of the line. Among its passengers are 61 survivors of the disaster, heading to France.
