= Amarante massacre =

1997 Shooting in Portugal

The Amarante massacre took place on April 16, 1997, at the Meia Culpa bar in Amarante, Portugal.

Three armed men wearing hoods forced the clients and staff against the wall and doused the place with gasoline, which they then ignited. In the midst of the confusion and panic that followed, thirteen people died.

The perpetrator of the crime was the owner of a rival establishment, who was sentenced to 25 years in prison (the maximum penalty in the Portuguese penal code), as were the three perpetrators of the task and an intermediary.

In April 2017, it was announced in the press that Ricardo Rocha, aged 43, and one of the five sentenced to the maximum sentence in the case "Meia Culpa", will be released on April 24, 2017. He is the penultimate of the arguidos to be granted parole from the prison in Paços de Ferreira.
