= Vitinha (footballer, born 1992) =

Portuguese footballer

Personal information
- Full name: Vítor Hugo Silva Azevedo
- Date of birth: 3 July 1992 (age 34)
- Place of birth: Famalicão, Portugal
- Height: 1.73 m (5 ft 8 in)
- Position: Midfielder

Team information
- Current team: Ribeirão

Youth career
- 2004–2011: Ribeirão

Senior career*
Years	Team	Apps	(Gls)
2011–	Ribeirão	101	(2)
2012	→ Trofense (loan)	6	(0)

International career
2013	Portugal U21	1	(0)
- * Club domestic league appearances and goals as of 15 May 2016

Vítor Hugo Silva Azevedo (born 3 July 1992), known as Vitinha, is a Portuguese footballer who plays for G.D. Ribeirão as a midfielder.
