= 1993 in Portuguese television =

This is a list of Portuguese television related events from 1993.

== Events ==
- 20 February - Televisão Independente launches, becoming the fourth terrestrial channel in Portugal, just over five months after the launch of Sociedade Independente de Comunicação, Portugal's first private television channel.
- 1 October - Debut of Chuva de Estrelas, a series hosted by Catarina Furtado in which members of the public impersonate their favourite singers.

== Debuts ==
- 22 February - Telhados de Vidro (1993)
- Unknown - Chuva de Estrelas (1993-2000)

== Television shows ==
=== 1990s ===
- Roda da Sorte (1990-1994, 2008)

== Networks and services ==
=== Launches ===
Network	Type	Launch date	Notes	Source
Televisão Independente	Terrestrial television	20 February		
