= Jorge Franco (fencer) =

Portuguese fencer

Personal information
- Born: 17 September 1923 Portugal
- Died: 26 August 1989 (aged 65) Lisbon, Portugal

Sport
- Sport: Fencing

Jorge Franco (17 September 1923 – 26 August 1989) was a Portuguese fencer. He competed in the team sabre event at the 1952 Summer Olympics.
