= Xéxé =

Portuguese footballer

Personal information
- Full name: João Pedro Borges Saudade Garcia
- Date of birth: 15 December 1995 (age 30)
- Place of birth: Ribeira Grande), Portugal
- Height: 1.78 m (5 ft 10 in)
- Position: Forward

Youth career
- 2004–2012: União Micaelense
- 2012–2014: Santa Clara

Senior career*
Years	Team	Apps	(Gls)
2014	Santa Clara	1	(0)
2014–2015	Operário	29	(0)
2015–?	Ideal	17	(1)
- * Club domestic league appearances and goals as of 17 January 2016

João Pedro Borges Saudade Garcia (born 15 December 1995) aka Xéxé, is a Portuguese footballer who plays as a forward.

== Career ==
On 11 May 2014, Xéxé made his professional debut with Santa Clara in a 2013–14 Segunda Liga match against Sporting Covilhã.
