= Nuno Roque =

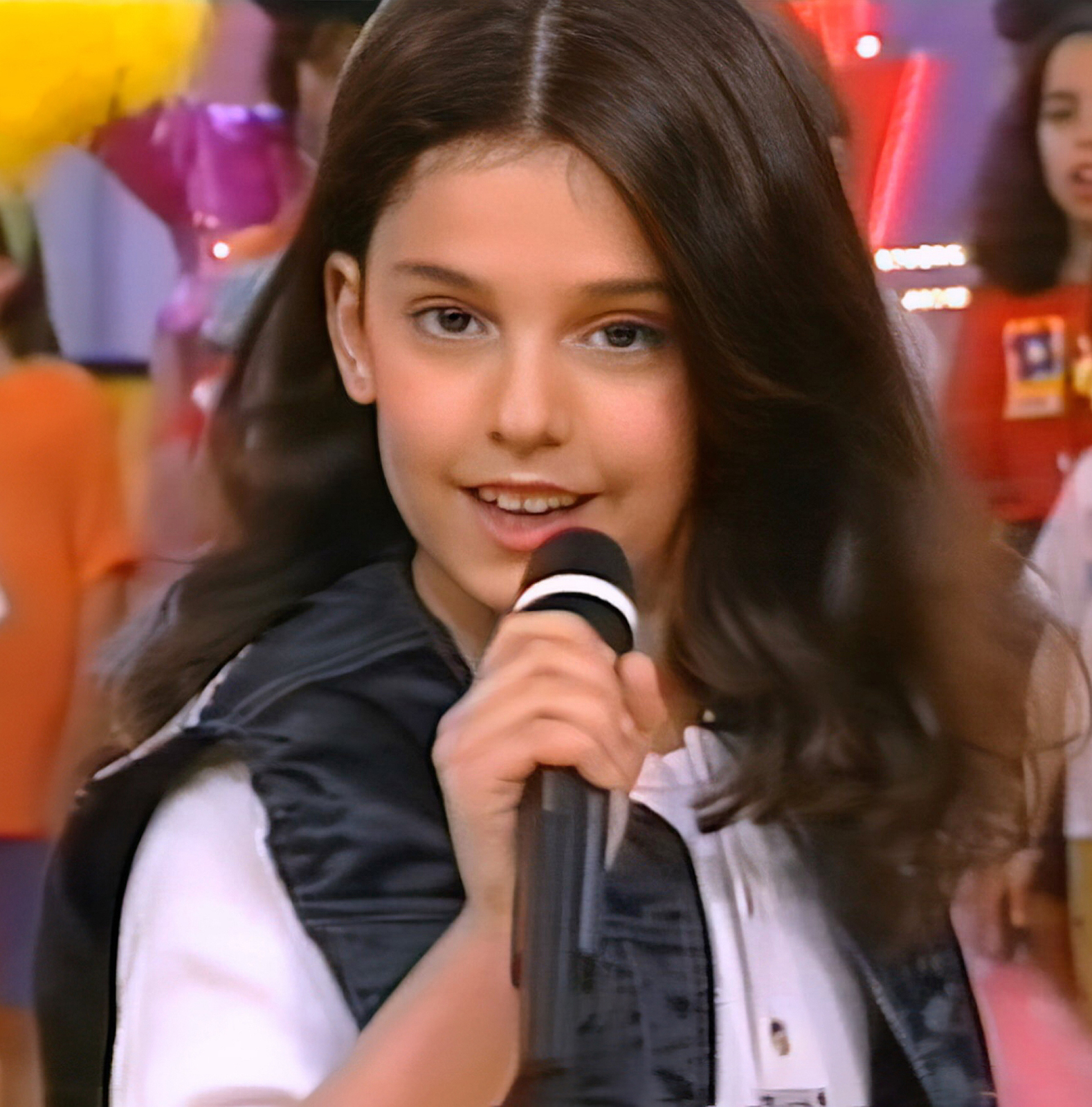
- Nuno Roque performing live in Lisbon.

Background information
- Born: Nuno Roque; Portugal
- Occupations: Artist; actor; singer; songwriter; director
- Website: nunoroque.com

Nuno Roque is a Portuguese artist, actor, singer-songwriter and director.

== Biography ==
=== Child Star ===
His mother was a revue performer. He made his stage debut aged three at Coliseu do Porto and began a successful career as a child singer in Portugal. Roque's repertoire was known for employing a variety of musical styles, such as dance, rock, cha-cha-cha and most notably, pop. His main collaborator was record producer Tony Lemos.

Throughout his early years, Roque won several awards at festivals and singing competitions and gained national recognition for his energetic television performances and androgynous image. In 1995, he released his first album, Brincar a Brincar, which compiled his most famous songs.

=== Theatre and Opera ===
He made his theatrical debut in São João National Theatre's production of The Resistible Rise of Arturo Ui by Bertolt Brecht. In 2005, he appeared in the first Portuguese production of The Laramie Project, directed by Diogo Infante, playing Matthew Shepard's murderer Aaron McKinney.

In his adolescence, he studied theatre and film in Portugal (graduating from Academia Contêmporanea do Espectáculo – Escola de Artes), Brazil (where he was a student of Fábio Barreto and Augusto Boal at Casa de Artes das Laranjeiras in Rio de Janeiro) and France, where he graduated from the École Internationale de Théâtre Jacques Lecoq in Paris, studying physical theatre and other major dramatic territories, such as melodrama, mime, tragedy, commedia dell'arte, clowning and buffon.

In France, his notable theatre appearances include C'était Marie-Antoinette at Festival de Radio France in 2009, Théâtre du Châtelet's production of The Magic Flute and Opéra National de Montpellier's production of Dido and Aeneas, playing The Sorceress. In 2011, he joined the troupe of Irina Brook, daughter of Peter Brook, on her production of Peter Pan at Théâtre de Paris. His performance as John Darling was praised for its employment of comedy, dance, singing, mime and acrobatics by Le Figaro, France Inter and Financial Times.

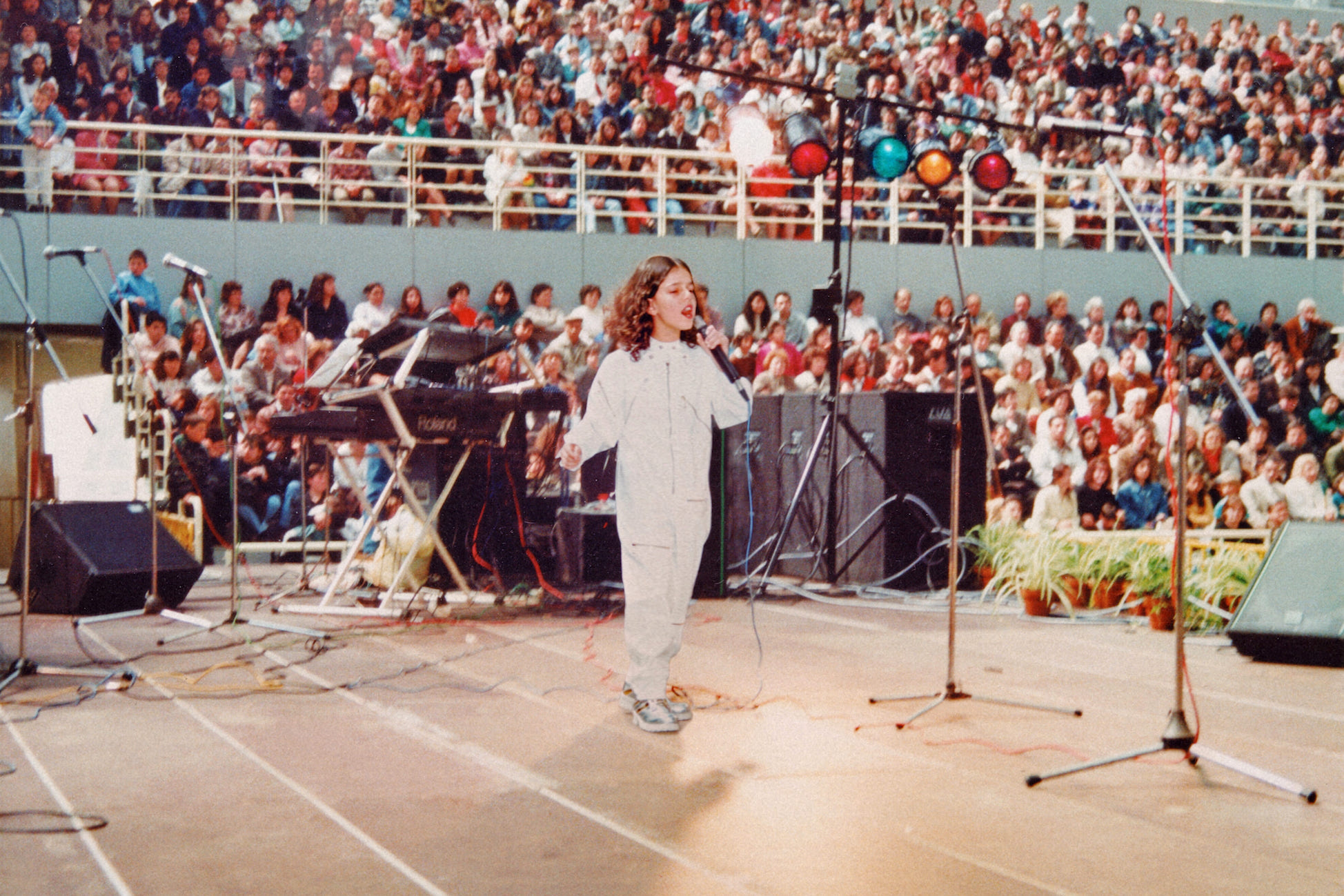
Nuno Roque performing at the Super Bock Arena in Porto.

=== Contemporary Art ===
In 2015, his work My Cake, was unveiled simultaneously in six European museums as part of Mons, European Capital of Culture. The art film was nominated for various art and music awards. In 2022, he was nominated for the Prix Voltaire de la Photographie for his series of self-portraits Self-Reflections (co-created with Gaudi Kaiser). On this occasion, the Centre des Monuments Nationaux exhibited Roque's work at the Château de Ferney-Voltaire and the Château de Bussy-Rabutin.

=== Cinema and Television ===
In April 2017, he hosted Le Gros Journal talk show on Canal+, live from The Peninsula Paris palace with a segment titled Le Coup d'un Soir avec Nuno Roque (One Night Stand with Nuno Roque). In 2018, he made his feature-film debut playing an illiterate 20-year-old in Best Intentions, starring opposite Agnès Jaoui, and participated as a guest columnist in the program Bons Baisers d'Europe on France 2.

In 2017, Nuno Roque joined #RightsOutLoud, a global campaign by the United Nations to help promote the Universal Declaration of Human Rights through multilingual videos, alongside figures such as António Guterres and Paulo Coelho. Roque recorded videos, in English, Portuguese and French, for an educational platform that aims to broaden access to the Declaration to millions of illiterate and visually impaired.

== Stage ==
Year	Title	Venue
2012	Die Zauberflöte by Mozart	Opéra de Marseille
2011	PAN (based on Peter Pan, or The Boy Who Wouldn't Grow Up) by J. M. Barrie	Théâtre de Paris and tour
2010	La Traviata by Giuseppe Verdi	Opéra National de Montpellier
2009	The Magic Flute by Mozart	Théâtre du Châtelet and tour
2009	C'était Marie-Antoinette by Évelyne Lever	Festival de Radio France
2009	Dido and Aeneas by Henry Purcell	Opéra National de Montpellier and tour
2008	Didascalies	Pompidou Centre
2008	Go Back To Old Kent Road	Museum of London Docklands
2005	The Laramie Project by Moisés Kaufman	Teatro Maria Matos
2004	Les Champs d'Amour	Festival Internacional de Teatro de Expressão Ibérica
2003	The Resistible Rise of Arturo Ui by Bertolt Brecht	São João National Theatre

== Filmography ==
=== Film ===
Year	Title	Role	Director	Notes
2018	Best Intentions	Thiago	Gilles Legrand	
2015	My Cake	Himself	Nuno Roque	Video art.

=== Television ===
Year	Title	Role	Notes
2018	Bons Baisers d'Europe	Himself	France 2
2017	Le Gros Journal : Le Coup d'un Soir avec Nuno Roque	Himself – Host	Canal+
2010	Marie Antoinette: Reine de L'Opéra	Papillon de la Ferté	France 2

== Discography ==
- Brincar a Brincar (1995) (Portugal)
- Eu, o Cão e o Gato (1997) (Portugal)

== Tours ==
- 1997 : Turné Nuno Roque (Portugal)
- 1996 : Turné Brincar a Brincar (Portugal)
- 1995 : Nuno Roque – O Espectáculo (Portugal)
- 1994 : Nuno Roque – A Alegria Dos Pequenitos, o Encanto Dos Adultos (Portugal)

== Awards and nominations ==
Year	Award	Category	Country	Result
2022	Prix Voltaire de la Photographie	Prix Voltaire de la photographie	(France)	Nominated
2015	Blooom Award by Warsteiner	Blooom Award	(Germany)	Nominated
2015	Eurovideo Festival	Prix Eurovideo	(Belgium)	Nominated
2015	30th International Digital Arts Festival Videoformes	Videoformes Award	(France)	Nominated
2015	International Portuguese Music Awards	People's Choice Award	(United States)	Nominated
1995	Festival da Canção Infantil de Braga	Best Performer	(Portugal)	Won
1994	Gala Internacional dos Pequenos Cantores – UNICEF	Best Song	(Portugal)	Won
1993	Festival da Canção Infantil de Braga	1st Prize	(Portugal)	Won
1993	Festival da Canção Infantil de Braga	Best Performer	(Portugal)	Won
1993	Festival da Canção de Campanhã	1st Prize	(Portugal)	Won
1993	Festival da Canção de Campanhã	Best Performance	(Portugal)	Won
