= Ricardo Tavares =

Portuguese footballer

Personal information
- Full name: Ricardo Ferreira Tavares
- Date of birth: 25 March 1995 (age 31)
- Place of birth: São João da Madeira, Portugal
- Height: 1.77 m (5 ft 10 in)
- Position: Left back

Youth career
- 2004–2007: Sanjoanense
- 2007–2013: Sporting CP
- 2013–2014: Porto

Senior career*
Years	Team	Apps	(Gls)
2013	Sporting CP B	4	(0)
2014	Porto B	1	(0)
2014–2016	Sanjoanense	32	(1)
2016–2019	Oliveirense	77	(5)
2019–2020	Estoril	1	(0)
2020–2021	Oliveirense	18	(2)
2021–2022	Lusitânia Lourosa	5	(0)
2023	Anadia	11	(0)
2023–2024	Marco 09		
2024–2025	Sanjoanense	12	(1)

International career
2010–2011	Portugal U16	11	(0)
2011–2012	Portugal U17	12	(1)
2012–2013	Portugal U18	8	(0)
- * Club domestic league appearances and goals as of 25 June 2025

Ricardo Ferreira Tavares (born 25 March 1995) is a Portuguese footballer who plays as a left back.

== Football career ==
On 30 March 2013, Tavares made his debut with Sporting B in a 2012–13 Segunda Liga match against Benfica B replacing Gaël Etock (39th minute).
