= Carlos Santos (footballer, born 1989) =

Portuguese footballer

Personal information
- Full name: Carlos Manuel Guedes dos Santos
- Date of birth: 31 March 1989 (age 37)
- Place of birth: Barroselas, Portugal
- Height: 1.88 m (6 ft 2 in)
- Position: Defender

Youth career
- 1997–2003: AD Barroselas
- 2003–2008: Porto
- 2004−2005: → Padroense (loan)
- 2006−2007: → Candal (loan)

Senior career*
Years	Team	Apps	(Gls)
2008–2011	Eléctrico	62	(6)
2011	Juventude Évora	6	(0)
2011–2012	Coimbrões	18	(0)
2012–2017	Boavista	89	(5)
2017–2018	Salgueiros	12	(1)
2018–2019	AD Oliveirense	11	(1)
Total		198	(13)

International career
2005	Portugal U16	4	(1)
2005	Portugal U17	7	(0)
- * Club domestic league appearances and goals

Carlos Manuel Guedes dos Santos (born 31 March 1989) is a Portuguese former professional footballer who played mainly as a central defender but also as a left back.

== Club career ==
Born in Barroselas, Viana do Castelo District, Santos spent the vast majority of his career in the lower leagues. In 2012, he signed with Boavista F.C. of the third division.

At the end of 2013–14, and due to the consequences of the Apito Dourado affair, the club was promoted straight into the Primeira Liga. He made his debut in the competition on 14 September 2014 at the age of 25, playing the full 90 minutes in a 1–0 home win against Académica de Coimbra, and finished his first season with two goals in 25 matches to help his team easily retain their league status.

In the summer of 2017, Santos left the Estádio do Bessa and had almost everything arranged with Aris Limassol FC, having even been presented. However, he left after the Cypriot First Division club tried to alter the contract's conditions without his knowledge, and joined S.C. Salgueiros in his country's third tier shortly after.
