= Ruizinho (footballer, born 1991) =

Portuguese footballer

Rui Tiago Caldas Carvalho (born 5 March 1991) known as Ruizinho, is a Portuguese footballer who played at a professional level for teams in the second and third divisions of the Portuguese League including for C.D. Santa Clara as a forward.

Over his career he played for CD Aves, Boavista FC, SC Espinho, C.D. Santa Clara, C.D. Cinfães, F.C. Tirsense, A.D. Limianos, F.C. Gobelins, TSV Benningen, SpVgg 07 Ludwigsburg, TV Pflugfelden and TSG Backnang In 2021, he signed for TV Echterdingen who play in the Landesliga, the seventh tier of the German football pyramid

== See also ==
- Football in Portugal
